= 2020 Conservative Party of Canada leadership election =

Party election in Canada

2020 Conservative leadership election
- July – 21 August 2020
- Opinion polls
- Turnout: 65.01% (▲10.44 pp)
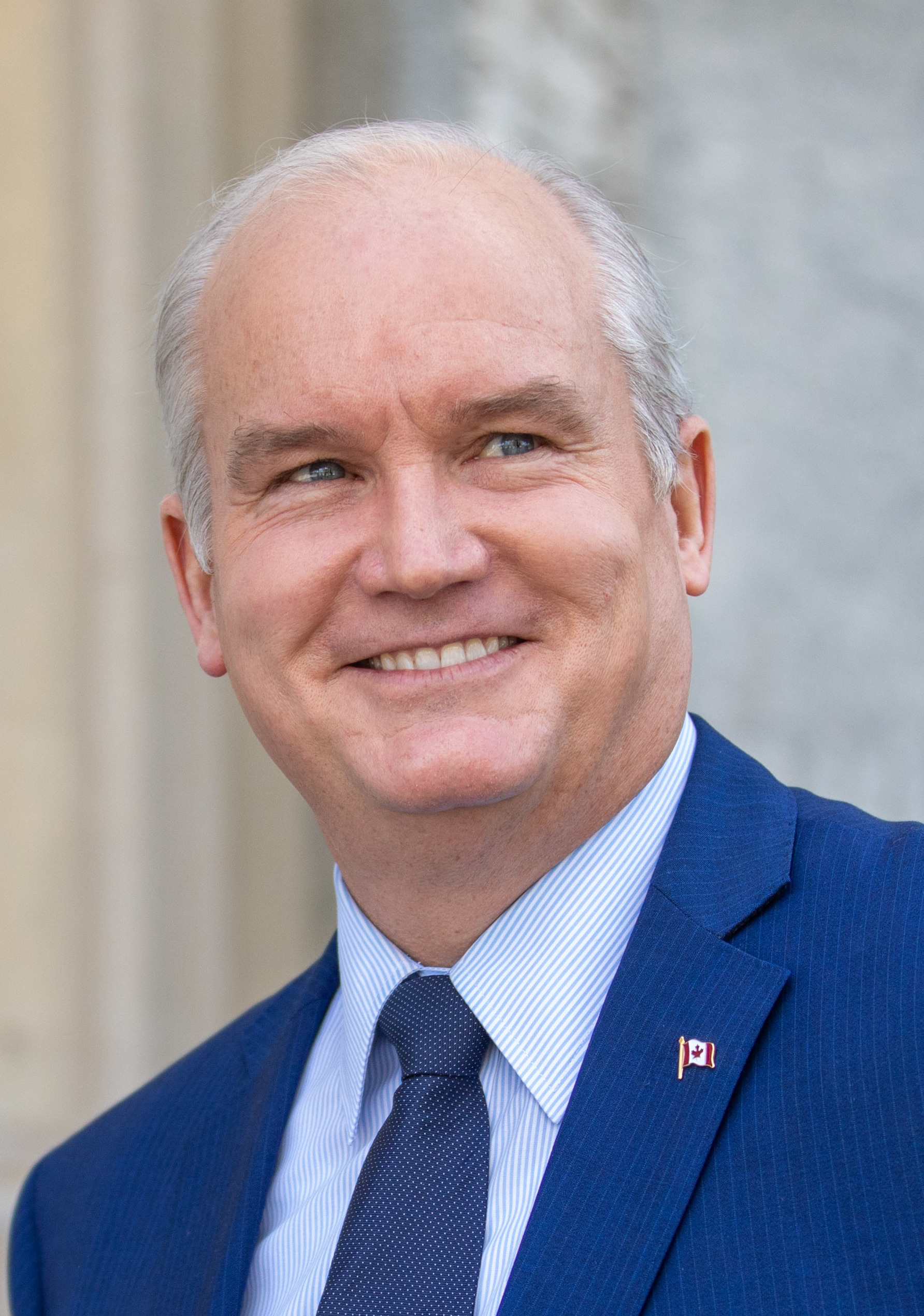

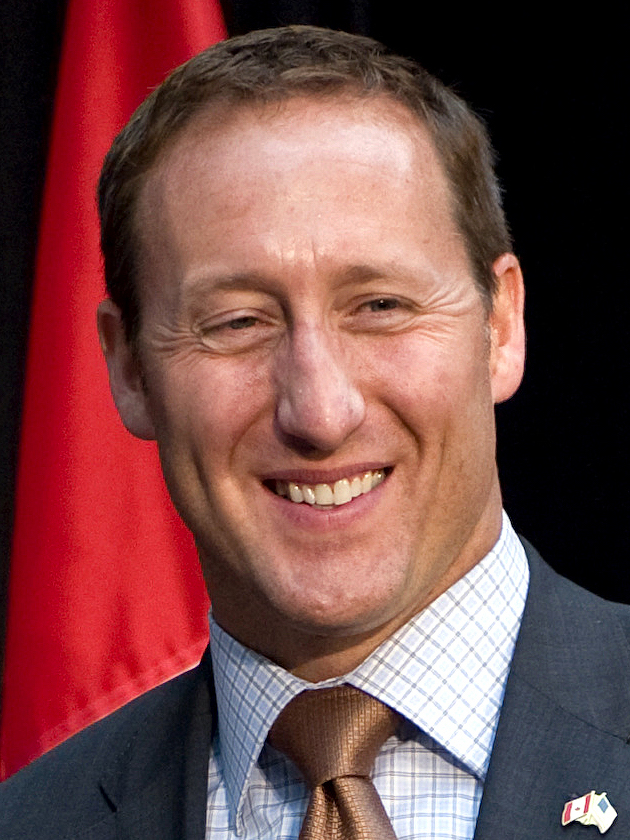

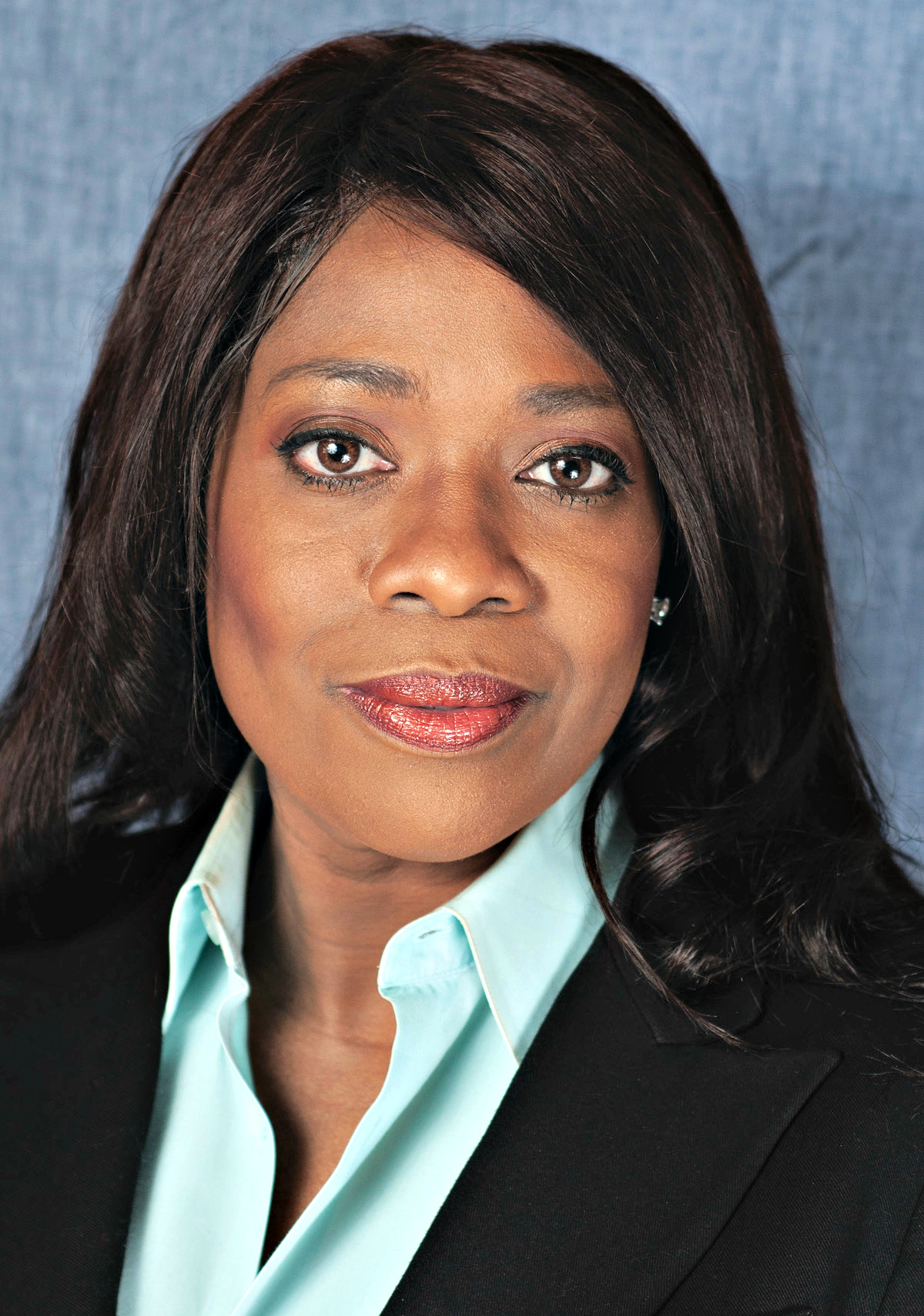

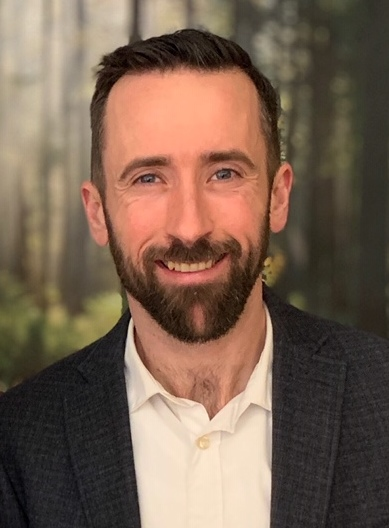
Candidate	Erin O'Toole	Peter MacKay
Third round points	19,271.74 (57.02%)	14,528.26 (42.98%)
Second round points	11,903.69 (35.22%)	11,756.01 (34.78%)
First round points	10,681.40 (31.60%)	11,328.55 (33.52%)
Candidate	Leslyn Lewis	Derek Sloan
Third round points	Eliminated	Eliminated
Second round points	10,140.30 (30.00%)	Eliminated
First round points	6,925.38 (20.49%)	4,864.67 (14.39%)
Previous leader
Andrew Scheer
Elected Leader
Erin O'Toole

2020 Conservative leadership election
- Date: August 23, 2020
- Convention: Shaw Centre, Ottawa
- Resigning leader: Andrew Scheer
- Won by: Erin O'Toole
- Ballots: 175,192
- Candidates: 4
- Entrance fee: $300,000 (of which $100,000 is a refundable compliance deposit)

In 2020, the Conservative Party of Canada held a leadership election held to elect a new party leader. The election was prompted by Andrew Scheer's announcement in December 2019 that he would resign as party leader. The election was conducted by postal ballot from mid-July to August 21, 2020, with the ballots processed and results announced on August 23–24, 2020. The $300,000 entrance fee made it the most expensive leadership race in the history of Canadian politics, at that time.

Four candidates were running for the position: member of parliament and former veterans affairs minister Erin O'Toole, co-founder of the Conservative Party Peter MacKay, Toronto lawyer Leslyn Lewis and member of parliament Derek Sloan.

The election was originally scheduled for June 27, 2020, but on March 26, the party suspended the race due to the COVID-19 pandemic in Canada. On April 29, it was announced that the race would proceed by postal ballot with the election itself being rescheduled from June to August. MacKay led the first ballot with 33.52 per cent by a narrow margin of around 2 per cent. O'Toole subsequently led on the second ballot and won on the third ballot, becoming the new leader of the Conservative Party.

== Campaign ==
=== Background ===
On October 21, 2019, the 2019 Canadian federal election was held. The Conservatives remained in opposition against a minority Liberal government. Under the Conservative Party's constitution, an election loss results in a leadership review at the next party convention. The following day, Scheer announced his intention to remain leader of the party.

As early as October 23, there were reports that party members were already privately voicing dissatisfaction with Scheer's leadership, and suggestions that he could face a leadership challenge at the next party convention in April. By the end of the month, Conservative figures were making their criticism public, and an online petition was launched that called for Scheer to resign. Former MP and cabinet minister Peter MacKay described the election as "like having a breakaway on an open net and missing the net"; he attributed the loss to Scheer's socially conservative views, which he said "hung around [his] neck like a stinking albatross" and distracted from other policies and issues. MacKay's comments additionally fuelled speculation that he was vying for the leadership.

On November 6, Scheer met with the Conservative caucus for the first time since the election, where they discussed the federal election and why the party failed to win. Scheer attributed the loss not to policy, but poor communication. During the meeting, the caucus voted against adopting the provisions of the Reform Act; as adopting them would have allowed the caucus to begin the process of ousting Scheer, his leadership was seen as safe until the April convention. However, criticism did not abate; a report in the Toronto Star cited calls for Scheer's resignation from within the business community, energy sector and several high-profile party insiders.

On December 12, Scheer announced that he was stepping down as leader, pending the election of his successor. He also said he would stay on as MP for Regina—Qu'Appelle "for the near future". The leadership convention was scheduled for June 27, 2020.

=== Impact of the COVID-19 pandemic ===
The COVID-19 pandemic affected the timing of the leadership election. On March 12, Peter MacKay, Erin O'Toole, Rick Peterson and Leslyn Lewis suspended all public campaign events, while Marilyn Gladu "assess[ed] events and activities on a daily and event-by-event basis", due to public health guidelines. The next day, March 13, Gladu, Rudy Husny and Rick Peterson called for either the race to be postponed or for entry deadlines to be pushed back. On March 19, Husny dropped out, citing an unwillingness to fundraise during a public health emergency. Peterson followed on March 20, criticizing the organizing committee's unwillingness to move the deadlines as unfair.

On March 26, the Leadership Election Organizing Committee (LEOC) postponed the race, as well as cancelling debates planned for April and pushing back the membership deadline to May 15. The LEOC did not set a new date, and said they would revisit the decision on May 1. On April 29, the LEOC announced the resumption of the contest, with the vote taking place entirely by mail-in ballot and without a convention. No definitive date was set for when the results would be announced, but the LEOC clarified that the results would be announced "as soon as those ballots can be properly processed and examined by scrutineers while respecting any health guidelines in place at that time."

=== Allegations of hacking ===
On June 19, Erin O'Toole accused MacKay's campaign of theft of confidential campaign data and strategy including Zoom conference videos after discovering that their "systems were hacked earlier this week". Later that day, O'Toole filed a formal complaint and requested that the RCMP, OPP, and Toronto Police Service investigate Peter MacKay's campaign and his senior campaign staff member Jamie Lall.

On June 20, MacKay's campaign dismissed the allegations and called them a "desperate, last ditch strategy" and "mildly amusing." Lall publicly denied the allegations in a post on his personal Twitter account.

On June 22, the National Post reported that the O'Toole campaign received a confession letter from MP staff member implicating Lall and describing him as a "senior regional adviser to the Peter MacKay campaign." Later in the day, the RCMP released a statement saying they have begun an investigation into O'Toole's allegations against the MacKay campaign, while Lall stated that he is "aggressively pursuing" legal action against the O'Toole campaign. MacKay spokesperson Chisholm Pothier told CBC News Tuesday that the O'Toole team sent its confidential passwords and logins to more than 300 MPs and their political staff members — something Pothier said was done "negligently and with no reasonable expectation of privacy." In response, O'Toole campaign manager Fred DeLorey tweeted, "this is a willful attempt at deception. There is a big diff between sending invitees a code for specific meetings and someone breaking into the private admin and stealing all of the files. The former is standard operations, the latter is a crime. That is what is being investigated."

On June 24, an ex-staff member to MP Greg McLean admitted to trying to leak Erin O'Toole's confidential video records, but says the MacKay campaign turned him down, according to Toronto Star's Alex Boutilier and Kieran Leavitt. MP McLean later tweeted, "sadly, this is completely inconsistent with what was told to me and senior O'Toole officials by this young man. I know not to trust this. The police investigation will determine the truth" Erin O'Toole Campaign staff member Anthony Koch also tweeted, "how do you explain the Calgary and midtown Toronto IP addresses that accessed the zoom admin account illegally multiple times over the course of a week and downloaded over 140 unique videos?"

== Timeline ==
=== 2019 ===
- October 21 – The 2019 Canadian federal election was held. The Conservatives remained in opposition against a minority Liberal government. Under CPC rules, a loss in an election triggers an automatic leadership review.
- October 22 – CPC Leader Andrew Scheer announced he will continue as leader.
- December 12 – Andrew Scheer announced his pending resignation as leader of the Conservatives, Andrew Scheer will remain MP for Regina—Qu'Appelle when a new leader is elected.
- December 21 – The party executive announced that a national party policy convention scheduled for mid-April 2020 has been postponed until November "so greater focus could be given to the details and organization around the Conservative leadership election process."
- December 24 – The party announced that former Deputy Leader Lisa Raitt will co-chair the organizing committee for the leadership race. Dan Nowlan is the committee's other co-chair.

=== 2020 ===
- January 13 – Leadership election process officially commences.
- February 27 – Deadline for potential candidates to enter leadership election. Candidates must have, by this date, paid at least $25,000 towards their registration fee and submitted signatures of at least 1,000 party members qualified to nominate them for leader.
- March 25 – Deadline for candidates to meet all entry requirements, including having paid the $300,000 entrance fee and compliance deposit in full and collected signatures of 3,000 qualified party members from 30 Electoral District Associations, in at least seven provinces or territories.
- March 26 – Leadership race suspended indefinitely due to the COVID-19 pandemic crisis. Party officials said that the schedule for the debates and leadership convention would be revisited on May 1, 2020.
- April 29– The party's Leadership Election Organizing Committee announced the resumption of the leadership election process, with the vote to occur via mail-in ballot that needs to be received by August 21, 2020.
- May 15 – New deadline to sign up as a member for purposes of voting in the leadership race. Previous deadline was April 17, 2020.
- June 17 – French-language debate in Toronto, moderated by Dan Nowlan and Lisa Raitt.
- June 18 – English-language debate in Toronto, moderated by Dan Nowlan and Lisa Raitt.
- June 24 – Etobicoke—Lakeshore Conservative Association debate (online).
- ~~June 27~~ – Original date of the leadership election, postponed due to the COVID-19 pandemic.
- July 8 – Vancouver Centre Conservative Association debate via Zoom.
- July 14 – Announcement by the party that 269,469 members are eligible to vote in the leadership race, of which about 100,000 purchased their membership since the start of 2020.
- July 18 – Announcement by the party that ballots have been sent out to members.
- July 29 – Independent Press Gallery of Canada debate in Toronto.
- August 21, 5 p.m. EDT – Deadline for election ballots to be filled out and received in order to be counted. The previous date for the election had been 27 June 2020.
- August 23–24 – Leadership election results announcement at the Shaw Centre in Ottawa. According to the Leadership Election Organizing Committee: "The result will be announced as soon as those ballots can be properly processed and examined by scrutineers while respecting any health guidelines in place at that time." The first ballot was intended to be announced at 6:30 p.m. but was not announced after midnight EDT on August 24, due to issues with the envelope-opening and vote counting machines. The final result and O'Toole's victory speech were delivered shortly after 1 am EDT.

== Full results ==
Results by round
Candidate	1st round				2nd round				3rd round			
Candidate	Votes cast	%	Points allocated	%	Votes cast	%	Points allocated	%	Votes cast	%	Points allocated	%
Erin O'Toole	51,258	29.39%	10,681.40	31.60%	56,907	33.20%	11,903.69	35.22%	90,635	58.86%	19,271.74	57.02%
Peter MacKay	52,851	30.30%	11,328.55	33.52%	54,165	31.60%	11,756.01	34.78%	63,356	41.14%	14,528.26	42.98%
Leslyn Lewis	43,017	24.67%	6,925.38	20.49%	60,316	35.20%	10,140.30	30.00%	Eliminated			
Derek Sloan	27,278	15.64%	4,864.67	14.39%	Eliminated							
Total	174,404	100%	33,800	100%	171,388	100%	33,800	100%	153,991	100%	33,800	100%

Analysis of transferred votes, ranked in order of 1st preference votes
Candidate	Maximum round	Maximum votes	Share in maximum round	Maximum votes First round votesTransfer votes
Peter MacKay	3	63,356	41.14%	
Erin O'Toole	3	90,635	58.86%	
Leslyn Lewis	2	60,316	35.20%	
Derek Sloan	1	27,278	15.64%	
Eligible votes		153,991	88.3%	
Exhausted votes		20413	11.7%	

First round (votes cast)
MacKay	30.30%
O'Toole	29.39%
Lewis	24.67%
Sloan	15.64%

First round (points allocated)
MacKay	33.52%
O'Toole	31.60%
Lewis	20.49%
Sloan	14.39%

Second round (votes cast)
Lewis	35.20%
O'Toole	33.20%
MacKay	31.60%

Second round (points allocated)
O'Toole	35.22%
MacKay	34.78%
Lewis	30.00%

Third round (votes cast)
O'Toole	58.86%
MacKay	41.14%

Third round (points allocated)
O'Toole	57.02%
MacKay	42.98%

=== Provincial summary ===
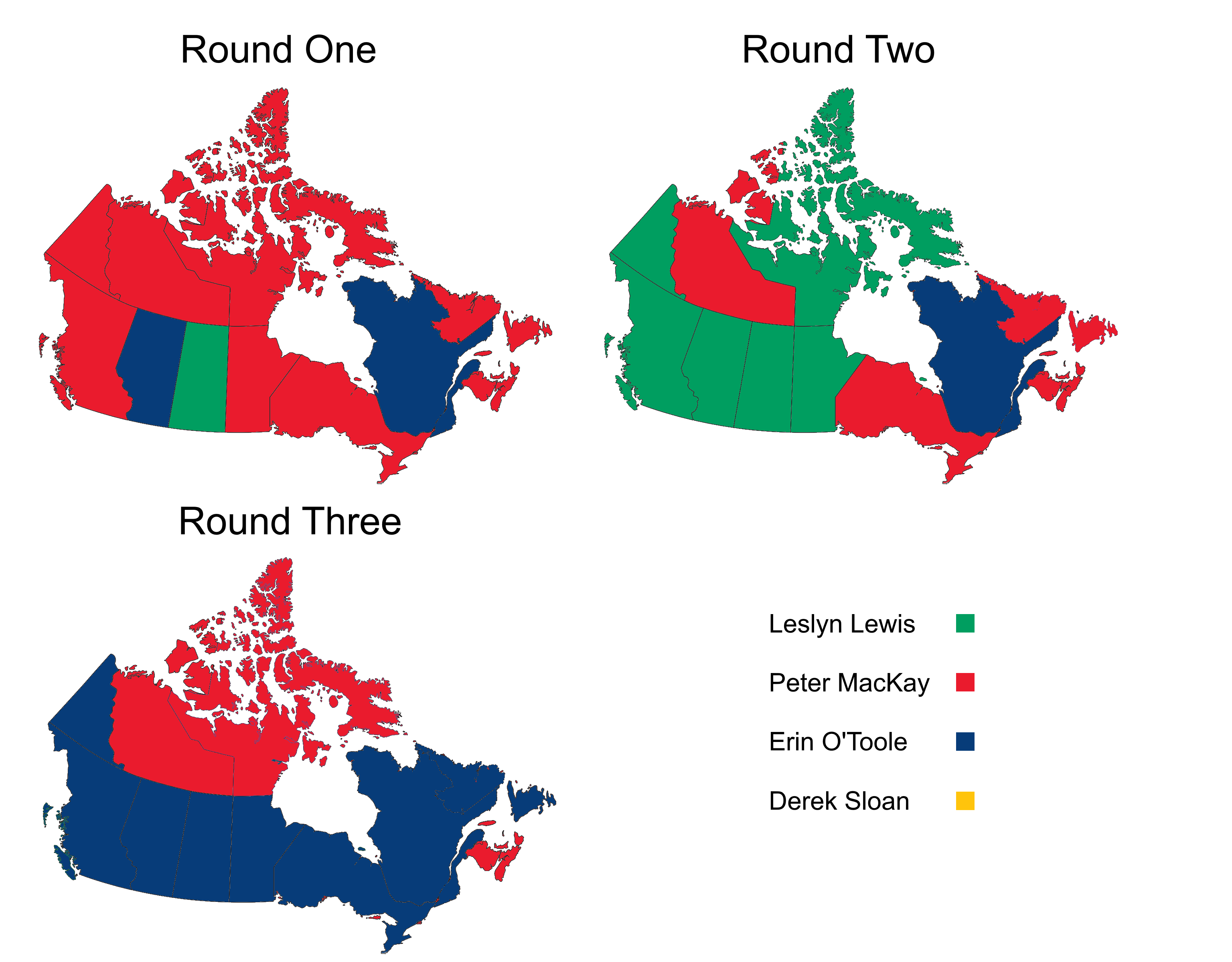
2020 Conservative Party of Canada Leadership election results by province.

First round results
Province	Peter Mackay		Erin O'Toole		Leslyn Lewis		Derek Sloan	
Province	Points	%	Points	%	Points	%	Points	%
Alberta	826	24.30%	1,084	31.89%	957	28.16%	532	15.65%
British Columbia	1,281	30.50%	1,255	29.88%	1,047	24.93%	617	14.69%
Manitoba	414	29.57%	373	26.64%	360	25.71%	253	18.07%
New Brunswick	533	53.30%	153	15.30%	204	20.40%	110	11.00%
Newfoundland and Labrador	282	40.23%	240	34.24%	118	16.83%	61	8.70%
Nova Scotia	710	64.55%	142	12.91%	160	14.55%	88	8.00%
Ontario	4,056	33.52%	3,414	28.21%	2,557	21.13%	2,073	17.13%
Prince Edward Island	206	51.50%	55	13.75%	96	24.00%	43	10.75%
Quebec	2,685	34.42%	3,532	45.28%	781	10.01%	802	10.28%
Saskatchewan	224	16.01%	369	26.38%	554	39.60%	252	18.01%
Territories	111	37.00%	65	21.67%	90	30.00%	34	11.33%

Second round results
Province	Peter Mackay		Erin O'Toole		Leslyn Lewis	
Province	Points	%	Points	%	Points	%
Alberta	866	25.46%	1,229	36.14%	1,306	38.40%
British Columbia	1,329	31.65%	1,413	33.65%	1,457	34.70%
Manitoba	434	31.00%	429	30.64%	537	38.36%
New Brunswick	546	54.58%	177	17.73%	277	27.68%
Newfoundland and Labrador	288	41.21%	258	36.85%	154	21.95%
Nova Scotia	723	65.70%	161	14.59%	217	19.71%
Ontario	4246	35.09%	3907	32.23%	3947	32.62%
Prince Edward Island	208	51.93%	65	16.37%	127	31.70%
Quebec	2765	35.44%	3771	48.34%	1265	16.22%
Saskatchewan	237	16.93%	421	30.07%	742	53.00%
Territories	114	37.94%	73	24.45%	113	37.61%

Third round results
Province	Peter Mackay		Erin O'Toole	
Province	Points	%	Points	%
Alberta	1,158	34.06%	2,242	65.94%
British Columbia	1,693	40.31%	2,507	59.69%
Manitoba	579	41.36%	821	58.64%
New Brunswick	647	64.70%	353	35.30%
Newfoundland and Labrador	332	47.43%	368	52.57%
Nova Scotia	820	74.55%	280	25.45%
Ontario	5,428	44.86%	6,672	55.14%
Prince Edward Island	250	62.50%	150	37.50%
Quebec	3,080	39.49%	4,720	60.51%
Saskatchewan	393	28.07%	1,007	71.93%
Territories	148	49.33%	152	50.67%

== Debates ==
Debates among candidates for the 2020 Conservative Party of Canada leadership election
No.	Date	Place	Host	Language	Participants			
P Participant N Non-invitee A Absent invitee O Out of race (exploring or withdrawn)					Lewis	MacKay	O'Toole	Sloan
1	June 17, 2020	Toronto, Ontario	Conservative Party of Canada	French	P	P	P	P
2	June 18, 2020	Toronto, Ontario	Conservative Party of Canada	English	P	P	P	P
3	June 24, 2020	Webex	Etobicoke—Lakeshore Conservative Association	English	P	A	P	P
4	July 8, 2020	Zoom	Vancouver Centre Conservative Association	English	P	A	P	P
5	July 29, 2020	Toronto, Ontario	Independent Press Gallery of Canada (IPG)	English	A	A	P	P

The fifth debate was turned into a fireside chat with the remaining two candidates after Leslyn Lewis released a statement sending her regrets due to a medical issue. Soon after Peter MacKay chose to not attend the debate.

== Rules and procedures ==
On January 11, 2020, the party's Leadership Election Organizing Committee released the Rules and Procedures for the 2020 Leadership document. It confirmed the vote would be held under instant-runoff voting. Voting was only open to members of the Conservative Party of Canada who had joined the party on or before April 17 (This date was later pushed back to May 15). Conservative Party membership is open to any Canadian Citizen or Permanent Resident age 14 or older.

To appear on the ballot, a member must apply to the Leadership Candidate Nomination Committee between January 13 and February 27, with 1,000 signatures of endorsement from party members (which must span at least 30 Electoral Districts in 7 provinces), a $25,000 installment of the registration fee and a completed 42-page Leadership Contestant Questionnaire, which requires them to declare they accept "the policies, principles, goals and objectives" of the Conservative Party. If approved by the Committees, the applicant has until March 25 to provide the remainder of the 3,000 endorsement signatures and $200,000 registration fee. In addition a $100,000 Compliance Deposit is required prior to 25 March but is returned upon completing required financial filings and adhering to Rules and Procedures document. As in the 2017 leadership election, each electoral district is given 100 points which are distributed according to weight of a candidate's vote in that electoral district, with the first candidate receiving 16,901 points wins the leadership race.

The contest was conducted entirely by postal ballot. To be counted, ballots needed to be completed and received by August 21, 2020, at 5:00 p.m. EDT.

== Candidates ==
Verified candidates are authorized contestants that have paid the full $200,000 registration fee, the entire $100,000 compliance deposit, and submitted all 3,000 required signatures of endorsement by March 25, 2020. Verified candidates have secured their name on the leadership ballot.

=== Approved ===
==== Leslyn Lewis ====
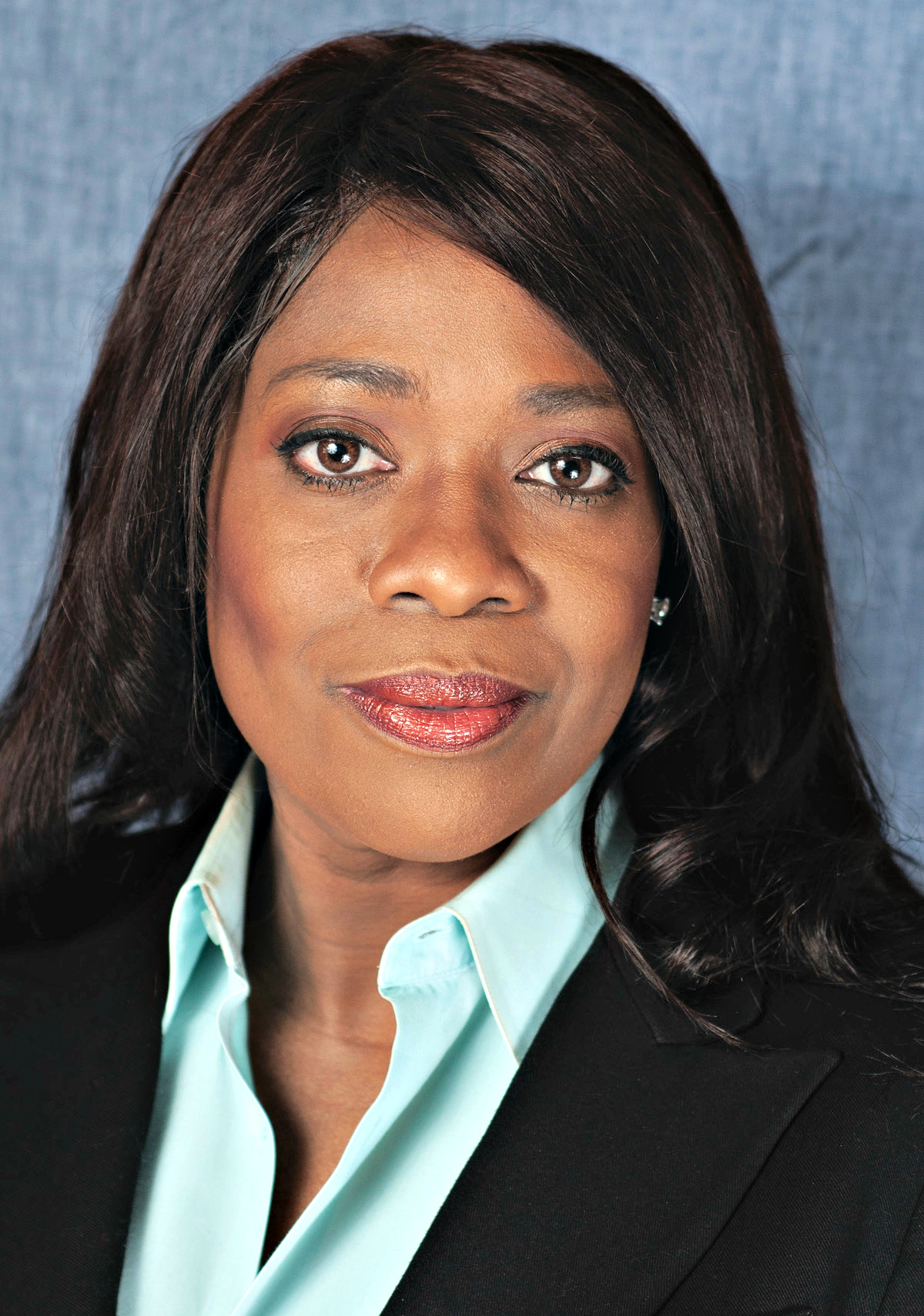
Leslyn Lewis

Background

Leslyn Lewis, 49, is a Toronto lawyer and the former CPC candidate for Scarborough—Rouge Park, Ontario in the 2015 election. Leslyn Lewis holds a bachelor's degree from University of Toronto, two master's degrees, a law degree from Osgoode Hall Law School and a PhD in International Law. Leslyn Lewis is also a Vice Chair of the Ontario Trillium Foundation and Chair of the Partnership Committee.

Candidacy announced: January 22, 2020
Date registered with Elections Canada:
Campaign website: Leslyn Lewis
Campaign slogan: Courage • Compassion • Common Sense
Campaign slogan (French): Courage • Compassion • Bon Sens

Endorsements of Leslyn Lewis

MPs: (7)

- Richard Bragdon (MP for Tobique—Mactaquac; Deputy Shadow Minister for Fisheries, Oceans and the Canadian Coast Guard and Atlantic Canada Opportunities Agency)
- Rosemarie Falk (MP for Battlefords—Lloydminster; Deputy Shadow Minister for Families, Children and Social Development)
- Tamara Jansen (MP for Cloverdale—Langley City; Deputy Shadow Minister for Labour)
- Glen Motz (MP for Medicine Hat-Cardston-Warner; Shadow Minister for Public Safety and Emergency Preparedness (Associate))
- Jeremy Patzer (MP for Cypress Hills—Grasslands; Deputy Shadow Minister for Natural Resources)
- Scott Reid (MP for Lanark—Frontenac—Kingston)
- Cathay Wagantall (MP for Yorkton—Melville; Deputy Shadow Minister for Veterans Affairs)

Senators:
Provincial & territorial politicians: (7)

- Will Bouma (Ontario MPP for Brantford—Brant)
- Greg Brkich (Saskatchewan MLA for Arm River)
- Larry Doke (Saskatchewan MLA for Cut Knife-Turtleford)
- Patterk Netser (Nunavut MLA for Aivilik, former MLA for Nanulik 2004–2008)
- Sam Oosterhoff (Ontario MPP for Niagara West)
- Billy Pang (Ontario MPP for Markham—Unionville)
- Dan Williams (Alberta MLA for Peace River)

Municipal politicians: (1)

- Shaun Collier (Mayor of Ajax, Ontario)

Former MPs: (8)

- John Cummins (MP for Delta, 1993–1997, Delta—South Richmond, 1997–2004 and Delta—Richmond East, 2004–2011)
- Dean Del Mastro (MP for Peterborough, 2006–2014)
- Reed Elley (MP for Nanaimo—Cowichan, 1997–2004)
- Ken Epp (MP for Elk Island, 1993–2004 and Edmonton—Sherwood Park, 2004–2008)
- Randy Kamp (MP for Dewdney—Alouette, 2004–2006 and Pitt Meadows—Maple Ridge—Mission, Pitt Meadows—Maple Ridge—Mission, 2006–2015)
- Pierre Lemieux (MP for Glengarry—Prescott—Russell, 2006–2015)
- Joy Smith (MP for Kildonan—St. Paul, 2004–2015)
- Brad Trost (MP for Saskatoon—University, 2004–2019)

Former Senators:
Former provincial politicians: (2)

- Bill Bennett (British Columbia MLA for Kootenay East, 2001–2017; Minister of Energy and Mines, 2010)
- Lyle Oberg (Alberta MLA for Bow Valley, 1993–1997 and Strathmore-Brooks, 1997–2008)

Former municipal politicians:
Other prominent individuals: (2)

- Craig Chandler (Businessman, lobbyist, and political activist)
- Charles McVety, president of Canada Christian College

Organizations: (1)

- Campaign Life Coalition

Media:
Total endorsements: 29

==== Peter MacKay ====
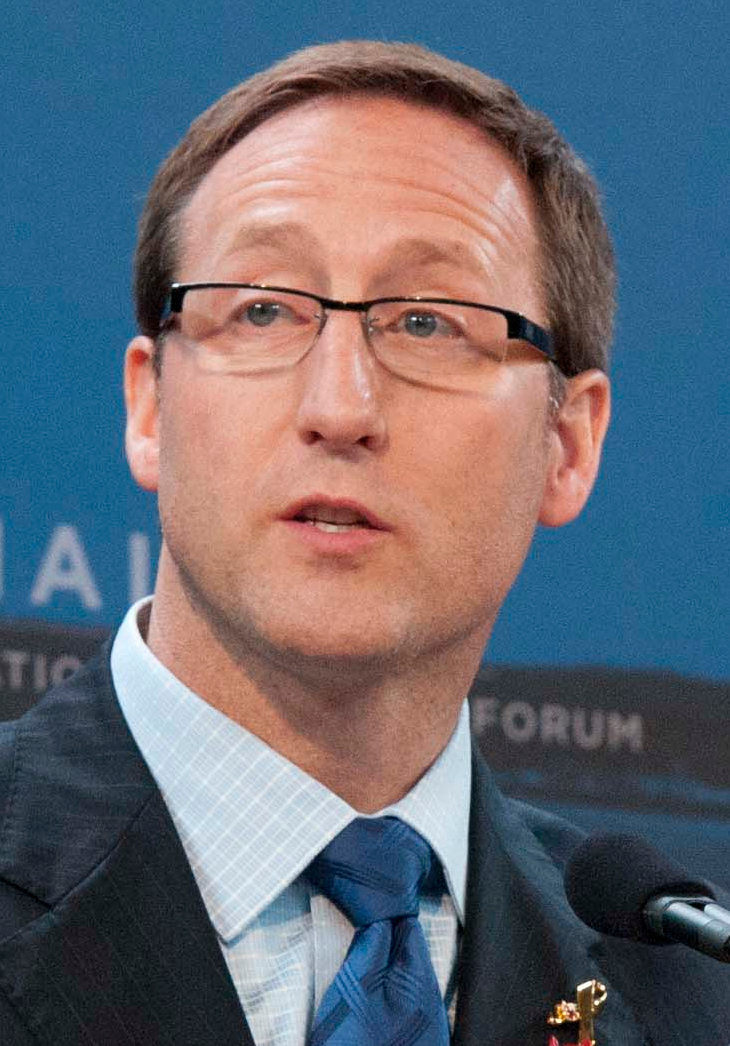
Peter MacKay

Background

Peter MacKay, 61, was the MP for Central Nova (2004–2015), and for Pictou—Antigonish—Guysborough (1997–2004). He was Minister of Justice and Attorney General (2013–2015), Minister of National Defence (2007–2013), Minister of Foreign Affairs (2006–2007), Deputy Leader of the Conservative Party of Canada (2004–2015). He was the leader of the Progressive Conservative Party of Canada (2003) at the time of the merger. Prior to entering politics, Peter MacKay worked as a Crown Attorney.

Candidacy announced: January 15, 2020
Date registered with Elections Canada:
Campaign website: www.petermackay.ca
Campaign slogan: Unite Build Lead
Campaign slogan (French): Unir Bâtir Diriger

Endorsements of Peter MacKay

MPs: (47)

- Ziad Aboultaif (MP for Edmonton Manning; Shadow Minister for Digital Government)
- Scott Aitchison (MP for Parry Sound-Muskoka; Deputy Shadow Minister for Tourism)
- Leona Alleslev (MP for Aurora—Oak Ridges—Richmond Hill; Shadow Minister for Foreign Affairs, former Deputy Leader of the Opposition and former Deputy Leader of the Conservative Party, 2019-2020)
- Dean Allison (MP for Niagara West; Shadow Minister for International Trade)
- Tony Baldinelli (MP for Niagara Falls; Deputy Shadow Minister for Transport)
- John Barlow (MP for Foothills; Shadow minister for Agriculture and Agri-Food)
- Luc Berthold (MP for Mégantic—L'Érable; Shadow Minister for Infrastructure and Communities)
- James Bezan (MP for Selkirk—Interlake—Eastman; Shadow Minister for National Defence)
- Steven Blaney (MP for Bellechasse—Les Etchemins—Lévis; Shadow Minister for Canadian Heritage)
- Blaine Calkins (MP for Red Deer-Lacombe, Chairman of the Standing Committee on Access to Information, Privacy and Ethics and Deputy Shadow Minister for Wildlife, Conservation and Parks Canada)
- Colin Carrie (MP for Oshawa; Shadow Minister for Canada/US Relations and Federal Economic Development Agency for Southern Ontario)
- Michael Cooper (MP for St. Albert—Edmonton; Deputy Shadow Minister for Finance)
- James Cumming (MP for Edmonton Centre; Shadow Minister for Small Business and Export Promotion)
- Scot Davidson (MP for York—Simcoe)
- Chris d'Entremont (MP for West Nova; Shadow Minister for Official Languages and Atlantic Canada Opportunities Agency)
- Todd Doherty (MP for Cariboo—Prince George; Shadow Minister for Transport)
- Terry Dowdall (MP for Simcoe—Grey; Deputy Shadow Minister for Small Business and Export Promotion)
- Ed Fast (MP for Abbotsford, Shadow Minister for the Environment)
- Kerry-Lynne Findlay (MP for South Surrey—White Rock; Shadow Minister for Environment and Climate Change)
- Cheryl Gallant (MP for Renfrew—Nipissing—Pembroke; Shadow Minister for Veterans Affairs (Associate) and Economic Development Initiative for Northern Ontario)
- Bernard Généreux (MP for Montmagny—L'Islet—Kamouraska—Rivière-du-Loup; Shadow Minister for Rural Economic Development and Economic Development Agency of Canada for Regions of Quebec)
- Joël Godin (MP for Portneuf—Jacques-Cartier; Shadow Minister for Official Languages (Associate))
- Jacques Gourde (MP for Lévis—Lotbinière; Deputy Shadow Minister for Ethics)
- Jasraj Hallan (MP for Calgary Forest Lawn; Deputy Shadow Minister for Multiculturalism)
- Randy Hoback (MP for Prince Albert; Shadow Minister for International Trade)
- Matt Jeneroux (MP for Edmonton Riverbend; Shadow Minister for Health)
- Mike Lake (MP for Edmonton—Wetaskiwin; Shadow Minister for International Development)
- Richard Lehoux (MP for Beauce; Shadow Minister for Agriculture and Agri-Food (Associate))
- Ben Lobb (MP for Huron—Bruce)
- Tom Lukiwski (MP for Moose Jaw—Lake Centre—Lanigan)
- Dave MacKenzie (MP for Oxford)
- Kelly McCauley (MP for Edmonton West; Deputy Shadow Minister for Public Services and Procurement)
- Phil McColeman (MP for Brantford—Brant; Shadow Minister for Veterans Affairs)
- Rob Moore (MP for Fundy Royal; Shadow Minister for Justice and Attorney General)
- Marty Morantz (MP for Charleswood—St. James—Assiniboia—Headingley; Shadow Minister for National Revenue)
- Pierre Paul-Hus (MP for Charlesbourg—Haute-Saint-Charles; Shadow Minister for Public Safety and Emergency Preparedness)
- Jag Sahota (MP for Calgary Skyview; Deputy Shadow Minister for Women and Gender Equality)
- Bob Saroya (MP for Markham—Unionville; Shadow Minister for Queen's Privy Council for Canada)
- Kyle Seeback (MP for Dufferin—Caledon; Deputy Shadow Minister for Immigration, Refugees and Citizenship)
- Doug Shipley (MP for Barrie—Springwater—Oro-Medonte; Deputy Shadow Minister for Infrastructure and Communities)
- Tim Uppal (MP for Edmonton Mill Woods; Shadow Minister for Treasury Board)
- Karen Vecchio (MP for Elgin—Middlesex—London; Shadow Minister for Women and Gender Equality)
- Kevin Waugh (MP for Saskatoon—Grasswood)
- Len Webber (MP for Calgary Confederation)
- John Williamson (MP for New Brunswick Southwest; Shadow Minister for Labour, former National Post editorial writer and former National Director of the Canadian Taxpayers Federation, 2004-2008)
- David Yurdiga (MP for Fort McMurray—Cold Lake; Deputy Shadow Minister for Northern Affairs and Northern Economic Development Agency)
- Bob Zimmer (MP for Prince George—Peace River—Northern Rockies; Shadow Minister for Northern Affairs and Northern Economic Development Agency)

Senators: (15)

- Salma Ataullahjan (Senator for Ontario)
- Denise Batters (Senator for Saskatchewan)
- Pierre-Hugues Boisvenu (Senator for Quebec)
- Claude Carignan (Senator for Quebec, Leader of the Opposition in the Senate and former Leader of the Government in the Senate)
- Norman Doyle (Senator for Newfoundland and Labrador and Former MP for St. John's East, 1997-2004, St. John's North, 2004-2006, and St. John's East, 2006-2008)
- Michael MacDonald (Senator for Nova Scotia)
- Fabian Manning (Senator for Newfoundland and Labrador, Former Newfoundland and Labrador MHA for St. Mary's-the Capes, 1993-1996, Placentia-St. Mary's, 1999-2006 and Former MP for Avalon, 2006-2008)
- Yonah Martin (Senator for British Columbia, Deputy Leader of the Opposition in the Senate)
- Tom McInnis (Senator for Nova Scotia, Former Nova Scotia MLA for Halifax Eastern Shore, 1978-1993)
- Percy Mockler (Senator for New Brunswick, Former New Brunswick MLA for Madawaska South, 1982-1987, Madawaska-la-Vallée, 1995-2006, and Restigouche-La-Vallée, 2006-2008)
- Thanh Hai Ngo (Senator for Ontario)
- Victor Oh (Senator for Ontario)
- Dennis Patterson (Senator for Nunavut, 5th Premier of the Northwest Territories)
- Rose-May Poirier (Senator for New Brunswick, Former New Brunswick MLA for Kent North, 1999-2010)
- David Wells (Senator for Newfoundland and Labrador)

Provincial & territorial politicians: (42)

- Barbara Adams (Nova Scotia MLA for Cole Harbour-Eastern Passage)
- Roman Baber (Ontario MPP for York Centre)
- Keith Bain (Nova Scotia MLA for Victoria-The Lakes, 2006-2013 and 2017-2024)
- Steve Clark (Ontario MPP for Leeds—Grenville—Thousand Islands and Rideau Lakes; Minister of Municipal Affairs and Housing)
- Brian Comer (Nova Scotia MLA for Sydney River-Mira-Louisbourg)
- Steve Craig (Nova Scotia MLA for Sackville-Cobequid)
- Stephen Crawford (Ontario MPP for Oakville)
- Ches Crosbie (Newfoundland and Labrador MHA for Windsor Lake, Leader of the Opposition in Newfoundland and Labrador, Leader of the Progressive Conservative Party of Newfoundland and Labrador)
- Rudy Cuzzetto (Ontario MPP for Mississauga—Lakeshore)
- Doug Downey (Ontario MPP for Barrie—Springwater—Oro-Medonte, Attorney General of Ontario)
- Pat Dunn (Nova Scotia MLA for Pictou Centre, 2006-2009 and 2013-2024)
- Goldie Ghamari (Ontario MPP for Carleton)
- Parm Gill (Ontario MPP for Milton and Former MP for Brampton—Springdale, 2011-2015)
- Tim Halman (Nova Scotia MLA for Dartmouth East)
- Larry Harrison (Nova Scotia MLA for Colchester-Musquodoboit Valley)
- Tim Houston (Nova Scotia MLA for Pictou East, Leader of the Opposition in Nova Scotia, Leader of the Progressive Conservative Association of Nova Scotia)
- Brad Johns (Nova Scotia MLA for Sackville-Beaver Bank, Halifax Regional Council for District 19 Middle and Upper Sackville - Lucasville, 2000-2012, and Halifax Regional Council for District 14 Middle/Upper Sackville – Beaver Bank - Lucasville, 2012-2016)
- Logan Kanapathi (Ontario MPP for Markham—Thornhill and Former City of Markham Ward 7 Councillor, 2006-2018)
- Daryl Kramp (Ontario MPP for Hastings—Lennox and Addington and Former MP for Prince Edward—Hastings, 2004-2015)
- Natalia Kusendova (Ontario MPP for Mississauga Centre)
- Colton LeBlanc (Nova Scotia MLA for Argyle-Barrington)
- John Lohr (Nova Scotia MLA for Kings North)
- Karla MacFarlane (Nova Scotia MLA for Pictou West, Former Leader of the Opposition in Nova Scotia, and Former Interim Leader of the Progressive Conservative Association of Nova Scotia)
- Kim Masland (Nova Scotia MLA for Queens-Shelburne)
- Christina Mitas (Ontario MPP for Scarborough Centre)
- Caroline Mulroney (Ontario MPP for York—Simcoe, oldest child and only daughter of former Prime Minister Brian Mulroney, Minister of Transportation, Minister of Francophone Affairs, and Former Attorney General of Ontario, 2018-2019)
- Michael Parsa (Ontario MPP for Aurora—Oak Ridges—Richmond Hill)
- Greg Rickford (Ontario MPP for Kenora-Rainy River, Minister of Energy, Northern Development and Mines, Minister of Indigenous Affairs and Former MP for Kenora, 2008-2015)
- Dave Ritcey (Nova Scotia MLA for Truro-Bible Hill-Millbrook-Salmon River)
- Ellis Ross (British Columbia MLA for Skeena, former chief councilor for the Haisla Nation, former BC Minister for Natural Gas Development, 2017-2017, former BC Minister Responsible for Housing, 2017-2017, and recipient of the Order of British Columbia in 2014)
- Tory Rushton (Nova Scotia MLA for Cumberland South)
- John Rustad (British Columbia MLA for Nechako Lakes, Prince George–Omineca, 2005-2009, and former BC Minister of Aboriginal Relations and Reconciliation, 2013-2017)
- Murray Ryan (Nova Scotia MLA for Northside-Westmount)
- Sheref Sabawy (Ontario MPP for Mississauga—Erin Mills)
- Prabmeet Sarkaria (Ontario MPP for Brampton South, Minister of Small Business and Red Tape Reduction)
- Donna Skelly (Ontario MPP for Flamborough—Glanbrook and Former Hamilton City Councillor, 2016-2018)
- Elizabeth Smith-McCrossin (Nova Scotia MLA for Cumberland North)
- Ben Stewart (British Columbia MLA for Kelowna West, Westside-Kelowna, 2009-2013, former BC Minister of Citizens' Services and former BC Minister Responsible for Multiculturalism and the Public Affairs Bureau, 2009-2010, former BC Minister of Community and Rural Development, 2010-2010, former BC Minister of Agriculture, 2010-2011, and former BC Minister of Citizens' Services and Open Government, 2012-2013)
- Nina Tangri (Ontario MPP for Mississauga—Streetsville)
- Vijay Thanigasalam (Ontario MPP for Scarborough—Rouge Park)
- Michael Tibollo (Ontario MPP for Vaughan—Woodbridge; Associate Minister of Mental Health and Addictions)
- Jeff Yurek (Ontario MPP for Elgin—Middlesex—London and Minister of Environment, Conservation and Parks)

Municipal politicians:
Former MPs: (47)

- Chris Alexander (MP for Ajax—Pickering, 2011-2015, Ambassador to Afghanistan, 2003-2005, and Minister of Citizenship and Immigration, 2013-2015)
- Scott Armstrong (MP for Cumberland—Colchester—Musquodoboit Valley, 2009-2015)
- Jay Aspin (MP for Nipissing—Timiskaming, 2011-2015)
- Jean-Pierre Blackburn (MP for Jonquiere-Alma, 2006-2011 and Jonquiere, 1984-1993)
- Sylvie Boucher (MP for Beauport—Côte-de-Beaupré—Île d'Orléans—Charlevoix, 2006-2011, 2015-2019)
- Lawrence Cannon (MP for Pontiac, 2006-2011, 9th Minister of Foreign Affairs, 2008-2011, and Canadian Ambassador to France, 2012-2017)
- John Carmichael (MP for Don Valley West, 2011-2015)
- Léo Duguay (MP for Saint Boniface—Saint Vital, 1984-1988)
- Dorothy Dobbie (MP for Winnipeg South, 1988-1993)
- Jim Edwards (MP for Edmonton South, 1984-1988, Edmonton Southwest, 1988-1993, and Former President of the Treasury Board, 1993-1993)
- Shelly Glover (MP for Saint Boniface, 2008-2015 and Minister of Canadian Heritage and Official Languages, 2013-2015)
- Robert Goguen (MP for Moncton—Riverview—Dieppe, 2011-2015)
- Gary Goodyear (MP for Cambridge, 2004-2015)
- Bal Gosal (MP for Bramalea—Gore—Malton, 2011-2015 and Minister of State for Sport, 2011-2015)
- Laurie Hawn (MP for Edmonton Centre, 2006-2015 and retired Lieutenant Colonel of the Royal Canadian Air Force)
- Loyola Hearn (MP for St. John's West, 2000-2004, St. John's South—Mount Pearl, 2004-2008, and 28th Canadian Ambassador to Ireland)
- Gerald Keddy (MP for South Shore, 1997-2004, and South Shore—St. Margarets, 2004-2015)
- Ryan Leef (MP for Yukon, 2011-2015)
- Chungsen Leung (MP for Willowdale, 2011-2015)
- Wladyslaw Lizon (MP for Mississauga East—Cooksville, 2011–2015)
- Inky Mark (MP for Dauphin—Swan River, 1997-2004 and MP for Dauphin—Swan River—Marquette, 2004-2010)
- Peter McCreath (MP for South Shore, 1988-1993 and Minister of Veterans Affairs, 1993-1993)
- Costas Menegakis (MP for Richmond Hill, 2011-2015)
- Ted Menzies (MP for Macleod, 2004–2013)
- Larry Miller (MP for Grey—Bruce—Owen Sound, 2004-2006 and MP for Bruce—Grey—Owen Sound, 2006-2019)
- Rob Nicholson (MP for Niagara Falls, 2004–2019 and 49th Minister of Justice and Attorney General)
- Alex Nuttall (MP for Barrie—Springwater—Oro-Medonte, 2015–2019 and Peter MacKay's campaign manager)
- Bev Oda (MP for Durham, 2004-2012, Canadian Heritage and Status of Women, 2006-2007, and Minister for International Cooperation)
- Joe Oliver (MP for Eglinton—Lawrence, 2011-2015, Minister of Natural Resources, 2011-2014, and Minister of Finance, 2014-2015)
- Tilly O'Neill-Gordon (MP for Miramichi, 2008-2015)
- Ted Opitz (MP for Etobicoke Centre, 2011-2015)
- John Douglas Reynolds (MP for West Vancouver—Sunshine Coast—Sea to Sky Country, 1997-2006, Former Interim Leader of the Canadian Alliance, 2001-2002 and Former Leader of the Opposition, 2001-2002)
- Andrew Saxton (MP for North Vancouver, 2008-2015)
- Gary Schellenberger (MP for Perth Wellington, 2004-2015)
- Gail Shea (MP for Egmont, 2008-2015, Minister of National Revenue, 2011-2013, Ministers of Fisheries and Oceans, 2008-2011, 2013-2015, and Prince Edward Island MLA for Tignish-Palmer Road, 2000-2007)
- Devinder Shory (MP for Calgary Northeast, 2011-2015)
- Tom Siddon (MP for Burnaby—Richmond—Delta, 1978-1979, Richmond—South Delta, 1979-1988, and Richmond, 1988-1993, Minister of Indian Affairs and Northern Development, 1990-1993, and Minister of National Defence, 1993-1993)
- Monte Solberg (MP for Medicine Hat, 1993–2008)
- Brian Storseth (MP for Westlock—St. Paul, 2006–2015)
- Lawrence Toet (MP for Elmwood—Transcona, 2011-2015)
- Merv Tweed (MP for Brandon—Souris, 2004-2013, and Manitoba MLA for Turtle Mountain, 1995-2004)
- Peter Van Loan (MP for York—Simcoe, 2004-2018, President of the Queen's Privy Council and Minister of Intergovernmental Affairs, 2006-2007, Minister of Public Safety, 2008-2010, Minister of International Trade, 2010-2011, and Leader of the Government in the House of Commons, 2007-2008, 2011-2015)
- Pierre H. Vincent (MP for Trois-Rivières, 1984-1993, Minister of Consumer and Corporate Affairs, 1990-1993, and Minister of the Environment, 1993-1993)
- Gerry Weiner (MP for Dollard, 1984-1988, Pierrefonds—Dollard, 1988-1993 and Mayor of Dollard-des-Ormeaux, Quebec, 1982-1984)
- Rodney Weston (MP for Saint John, 2008-2015 and New Brunswick MLA for Saint John-Fundy, 1999-2003)
- Wai Young (MP for Vancouver South, 2011-2015 and Mayoral candidate in the 2018 Vancouver municipal election)
- Terence Young (MP for Oakville, 2008-2015)

Former Senators: (12)

- Raynell Andreychuk (Senator for Saskatchewan, 1993-2019)
- Consiglio Di Nino (Senator for Ontario, 1990-2012)
- Janis Johnson (Senator for Manitoba, 1990-2016)
- Noël Kinsella (Senator for New Brunswick, 1990-2014 and former Speaker of the Senate, 2006-2014)
- Vim Kochhar (Senator for Ontario, 2010-2011)
- Ghislain Maltais (Senator for Quebec, 2012-2019, and Quebec MNA for René-Lévesque, 1983-1994)
- Michael Meighen (Senator for Ontario, 1990-2012. grandson of former Prime Minister Arthur Meighen, and 19th Chancellor of McGill University, 2014-2021)
- Michel Rivard (Senator for Quebec, 2009-2016, and Quebec MNA for Limoilou, 1994-1998)
- Bob Runciman (Senator for Ontario, 2010-2017, Ontario MPP for Leeds—Grenville—Thousand Islands and Rideau Lakes, 1987-2010, and Ontario MPP for Leeds, 1981-1987)
- Asha Seth (Senator for Ontario, 2012-2014)
- Gerry St. Germain (Senator for British Columbia, 1993-2012, MP for Mission—Port Moody, 1983-1988, Minister of Transport, 1988-1988, Minister of Forestry, 1988-1988, and President of the Progressive Conservative Party of Canada, 1989-1995)
- David Tkachuk (Senator for Saskatchewan, 1993-2020)

Former Provincial & territorial politicians: (10)

- Pat Binns (30th Premier of Prince Edward Island, 1996-2007)
- Bill Davis (18th Premier of Ontario, 1971-1985)
- Mario Dumont (Canadian television personality; Former Leader of the Opposition in Quebec, 2007-2008; Leader of the Action Démocratique du Québec, 1994-2009; Quebec MNA for Rivière-du-Loup, 1994-2009)
- Garfield Dunlop (Ontario MPP for Simcoe North, 1999–2015)
- Phil Gillies (Ontario MPP for Brantford, 1981–1987; Ontario Minister of Skills Development, 1985)
- Cliff Graydon (Manitoba MLA for Emerson, 2007-2019)
- John Hamm (25th Premier of Nova Scotia, 1999-2006 and Nova Scotia MLA for Pictou Centre, 1993-2006)
- Brian Jean (Former Leader of the Wildrose Party, 2015–2017; Leader of the Official Opposition in Alberta, 2015-2017; Alberta MLA for Fort McMurray-Conklin, 2015–2018; MP for Fort McMurray—Athabasca, 2004–2014)
- Brian Macdonald (New Brunswick MLA for Fredericton-Silverwood, 2010–2014 and Fredericton West-Hanwell, 2014–2018)
- Rodney MacDonald (26th Premier of Nova Scotia, 2006-2009 and Nova Scotia MLA for Inverness, 1999-2009)

Former municipal politicians:
Other prominent individuals: (4)

- Charles Adler (host of Charles Adler Tonight)
- Conrad Black (Businessman; founder of The National Post).
- George Canyon (Country music singer and 2019 Candidate in Central Nova)
- Tom Flanagan (Former advisor to Prime Minister Stephen Harper)

Organizations:
Media: (1)

- Toronto Star

Total endorsements: 178

==== Erin O'Toole ====
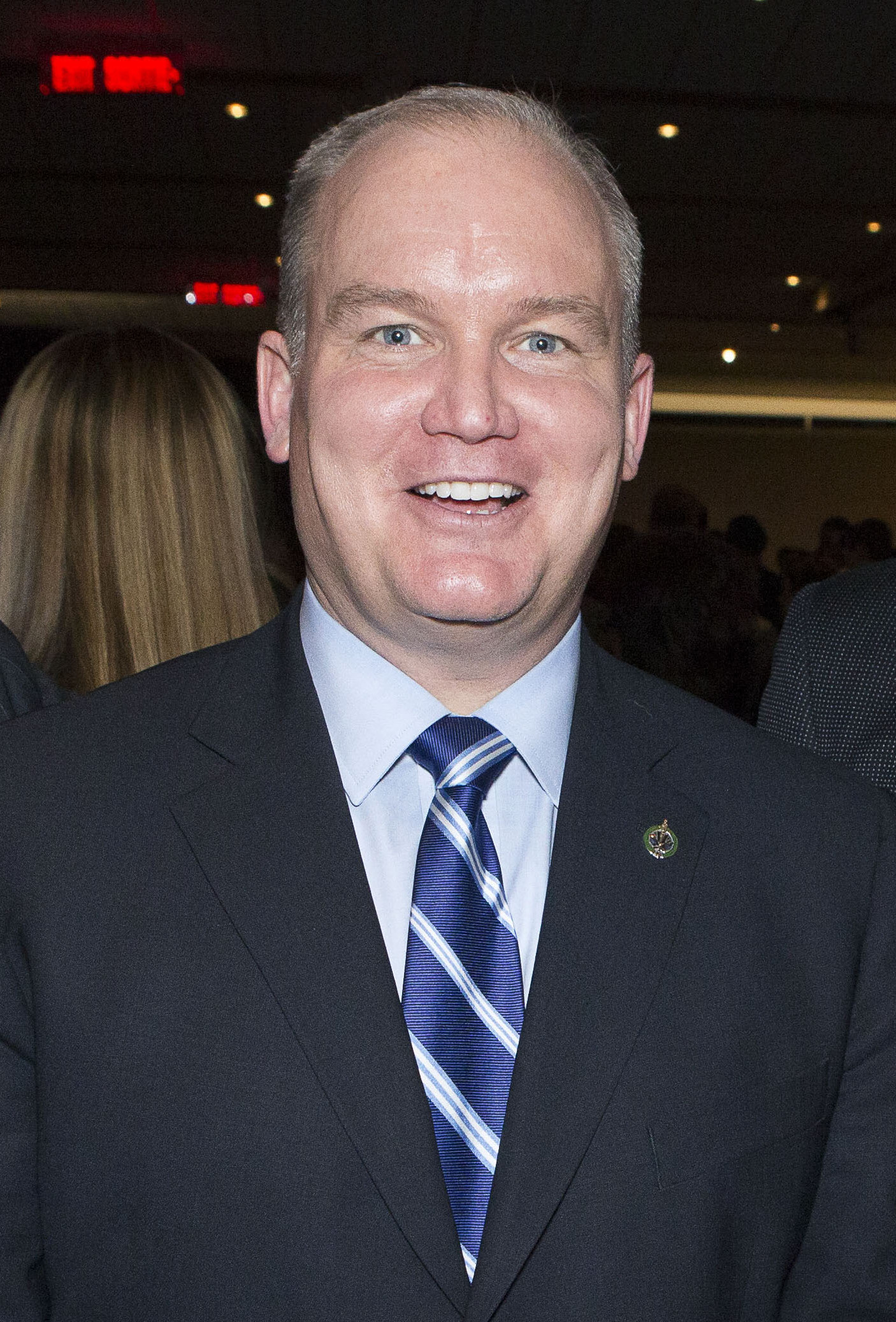
Erin O'Toole

Background

Erin O'Toole, 53, is the MP for Durham (2012–2023), the Shadow Minister of Foreign Affairs (2017–2020), and the former Shadow Minister of Public Safety and Emergency Preparedness (2015–2016) and Minister of Veterans Affairs (2015). He placed third in the 2017 Conservative leadership election. Prior to entering politics, Erin O'Toole served in the Royal Canadian Air Force, where he held the rank of Captain, and was a lawyer after completing military service.

Candidacy announced: January 25, 2020
Date registered with Elections Canada:
Campaign website: www.erinotoole.ca
Campaign slogan: True Blue Leadership
Campaign slogan (French): Un Vrai Bleu

Endorsements of Erin O'Toole

MPs: (38)

- Michael Barrett (MP for Leeds—Grenville—Thousand Islands and Rideau Lakes; Shadow Minister for Ethics)
- Bob Benzen (MP for Calgary Heritage)
- Kenny Chiu (MP for Steveston—Richmond East; Deputy Shadow Minister for International Development)
- Marc Dalton (MP for Pitt Meadows—Maple Ridge; Deputy Shadow Minister for Indigenous Services)
- Raquel Dancho (MP for Kildonan—St. Paul; Shadow Minister for Diversity and Inclusion and Youth)
- Kerry Diotte (MP for Edmonton Griesbach)
- Eric Duncan (MP for Stormont—Dundas—South Glengarry; Deputy Shadow Minister for Democratic Institutions)
- Dave Epp (MP for Chatham-Kent—Leamington; Deputy Shadow Minister for Foreign Affairs)
- Garnett Genuis (MP for Sherwood Park—Fort Saskatchewan; Shadow Minister for Multiculturalism)
- Tracy Gray (MP for Kelowna—Lake Country; Shadow Minister for Interprovincial Trade)
- Pat Kelly (MP for Calgary Rocky Ridge; Shadow Minister for Finance (Associate))
- Peter Kent (MP for Thornhill; Shadow Minister for Immigration, Refugees and Citizenship)
- Robert Kitchen (MP for Souris—Moose Mountain)
- Damien Kurek (MP for Battle River—Crowfoot; Deputy Shadow Minister for Rural Economic Development)
- Stephanie Kusie (MP for Calgary Midnapore; Shadow Minister for Families, Children and Social Development)
- Philip Lawrence (MP for Northumberland—Peterborough South)
- Dane Lloyd (MP for Sturgeon River—Parkland)
- Larry Maguire (MP for Brandon—Souris; Deputy Shadow Minister for Immigration, Refugees and Citizenship)
- Richard Martel (MP for Chicoutimi—Le Fjord; Shadow Minister for National Defence (Associate))
- Dan Mazier (MP for Dauphin—Swan River—Neepawa; Deputy Shadow Minister for Environment and Climate Change)
- Greg McLean (MP for Calgary Centre; Deputy Shadow Minister for National Revenue)
- Cathy McLeod (MP for Kamloops—Thompson—Cariboo; Shadow Minister for Natural Resources (Forestry and Mining))
- Eric Melillo (MP for Kenora; Deputy Shadow Minister for Democratic Institutions)
- Rob Morrison (MP for Kootenay—Columbia; Deputy Shadow Minister for Public Safety and Emergency Preparedness)
- Brad Redekopp (MP for Saskatoon West)
- Blake Richards (MP for Banff—Airdrie; Shadow Minister for Tourism and Western Economic Diversification)
- Lianne Rood (MP for Lambton—Kent—Middlesex; Deputy Shadow Minister for Agriculture and Agri-Food)
- Alex Ruff (MP for Bruce—Grey—Owen Sound; retired Canadian Armed Forces Colonel)
- Jamie Schmale (MP for Haliburton—Kawartha Lakes—Brock; Shadow Minister for Crown-Indigenous Relations)
- Martin Shields (MP for Bow River; Deputy Shadow Minister for Seniors)
- Gerald Soroka (MP for Yellowhead; Deputy Shadow Minister for Natural Resources (Forestry and Mining))
- Bruce Stanton (MP for Simcoe North; Deputy Speaker of the House of Commons)
- Warren Steinley (MP for Regina—Lewvan; Deputy Shadow Minister for Treasury Board)
- David Sweet (MP for Flamborough—Glanbrook; Shadow Minister for International Human Rights and Religious Freedom)
- Corey Tochor (MP for Saskatoon—University; Deputy Shadow Minister for Intergovernmental Affairs)
- Tako Van Popta (MP for Langley—Aldergrove)
- Gary Vidal (MP for Desnethé—Missinippi—Churchill River; Shadow Minister for Indigenous Services)
- Brad Vis (MP for Mission—Matsqui—Fraser Canyon; Deputy Shadow Minister for Employment, Workforce Development and Disability Inclusion)

Senators: (3)

- Leo Housakos, (Senator for Quebec, Speaker of the Senate)
- Judith Seidman (Senator for Quebec)
- Larry Smith, (Senator for Quebec, Former Leader of the Opposition in the Senate)

Provincial & territorial politicians: (44)

- Aris Babikian (Ontario MPP for Scarborough—Agincourt (provincial electoral district))
- Toby Barrett (Ontario MPP for Haldimand—Norfolk)
- Peter Bethlenfalvy (Ontario MPP for Pickering—Uxbridge and President of the Treasury Board)
- Steven Bonk (Saskatchewan MLA for Moosomin)
- David Buckingham (Saskatchewan MLA for Saskatoon Westview)
- Stan Cho (Ontario MPP for Willowdale)
- Lorne Coe (Ontario MPP for Whitby and Chief Government Whip)
- Dan D'Autremont (Saskatchewan MLA for Cannington and Speaker of the Legislative Assembly of Saskatchewan)
- Christine Elliott (Deputy Premier of Ontario and Ontario MPP for Newmarket—Aurora)
- Mike Ellis (Alberta MLA for Calgary-West and Deputy Leader of the United Conservative Party)
- Vic Fedeli (Ontario MPP for Nipissing and Minister of Economic Development, Job Creation and Trade)
- Amy Fee (Ontario MPP for Kitchener South—Hespeler)
- Muhammad Fiaz (Saskatchewan MLA for Regina Pasqua)
- Tanya Fir (Alberta MLA for Calgary-Peigan and Minister for Economic Development)
- Michaela Glasgo (Alberta MLA for Brooks-Medicine Hat)
- Stacey Hassard (Yukon MLA for Pelly-Nisutlin, Leader of the Official Opposition in Yukon; former Interim Leader of the Yukon Party, 2016-2020)
- Jason Kenney (Premier of Alberta and Alberta MLA for Calgary-Lougheed)
- Delbert Kirsch (Saskatchewan MLA for Batoche)
- Greg Lawrence (Saskatchewan MLA for Moose Jaw Wakamow)
- Kaycee Madu (Alberta MLA for Edmonton-South West and Minister of Municipal Affairs)
- Gila Martow (Ontario MPP for Thornhill)
- Ric McIver (Alberta MLA for Calgary-Hays and Minister of Transportation of Alberta)
- Nicholas Milliken (Alberta MLA for Calgary-Currie)
- Dale Nally (Alberta MLA for Morinville-St. Albert)
- Rick Nicholls (Ontario MPP for Chatham-Kent—Leamington)
- Demetrios Nicolaides (Alberta MLA for Calgary-Bow and Alberta Minister of Advanced Education)
- Jason Nixon (Alberta MLA for Rimbey-Rocky Mountain House-Sundre)
- Jeremy Nixon (Alberta MLA for Calgary-Klein)
- Lindsey Park (Ontario MPP for Durham)
- David Piccini (Ontario MPP for Northumberland—Peterborough South)
- Josephine Pon (Alberta MLA for Calgary-Beddington and Alberta Minister of Seniors and Housing)
- Jeremy Roberts (Ontario MPP for Ottawa West—Nepean)
- Miranda Rosin (Alberta MLA for Banff-Kananaskis)
- Laura Ross (Saskatchewan MLA for Regina Qu'Appelle Valley)
- Rajan Sawhney (Alberta MLA for Calgary-North East and Minister of Community and Social Services of Alberta)
- Rebecca Schulz (Alberta MLA for Calgary-Shaw and Minister of Children Services)
- Tyler Shandro (Alberta MLA for Calgary-Acadia and Minister of Health of Alberta)
- Dave Smith (Ontario MPP for Peterborough—Kawartha)
- Lyle Stewart (Saskatchewan MLA for Lumsden-Morse)
- Christine Tell (Saskatchewan MLA for Regina Wascana Plains)
- Lisa Thompson (Ontario MPP for Huron—Bruce and Minister of Government and Consumer Services)
- Bill Walker (Ontario MPP for Bruce—Grey—Owen Sound)
- Rick Wilson (Alberta MLA for Maskwacis-Wetaskiwin)
- Colleen Young (Saskatchewan MLA for Lloydminster)

Municipal politicians: (1)

- Michael Harris (Waterloo Regional Councillor for Cambridge, former Ontario MPP for Kitchener—Conestoga, 2011–2018)

Former MPs: (4)

- Alupa Clarke (MP for Beauport—Limoilou, 2015–2019)
- Christian Paradis (MP for Mégantic—L'Érable, 2006-2015, Minister of Industry, 2011-2013, Minister for International Cooperation, 2013-2015, Minister for La Francophonie, 2013-2015)
- Gerry Ritz (MP for Battlefords—Lloydminster 1997-2017, Minister of Agriculture and Agri-Food 2007-2015)
- Chuck Strahl (MP for Fraser Valley East, 1993–1997, Fraser Valley, 1997–2004 and Chilliwack—Fraser Canyon, 2004–2011)

Former Senators: (1)

- Kelvin Ogilvie (Senator for Nova Scotia, 2009-2017, and former President of Acadia University)

Former provincial politicians: (1)

- Linda Johnson (Former Alberta MLA for Calgary-Glenmore)

Former municipal politicians: (1)

- Yves Lévesque (Former Mayor of Trois-Rivières, Quebec, 2001-2018)

Other prominent individuals: (4)

- Diane Francis (US-born Canadian journalist, author and editor-at-large for the National Post)
- Vincenzo Guzzo (CEO of Cinémas Guzzo, Groupe Guzzo Construction inc., Guzzo Medical, and Guzzo Hospitality)
- W. Brett Wilson (Panelist on CBC Television's Dragons' Den)

Organizations:
Media:
Total endorsements: 97

==== Derek Sloan ====
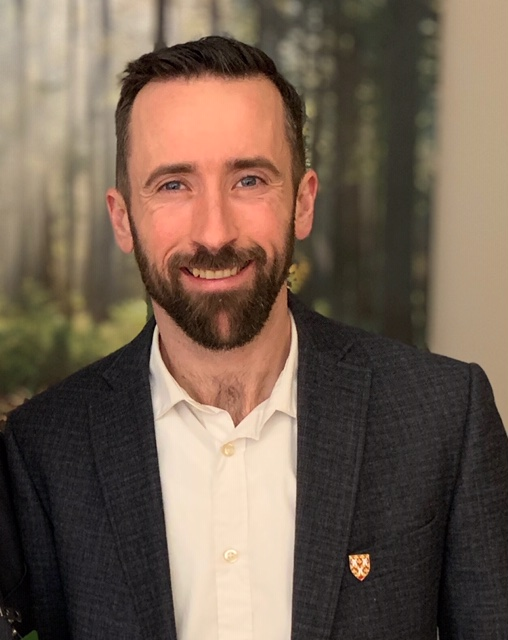
Derek Sloan

Background

Derek Sloan, 42, is the MP for Hastings—Lennox and Addington (2019–2021). Prior to entering politics, Derek Sloan worked as a lawyer in private practice.

Candidacy announced: January 22, 2020
Date registered with Elections Canada:
Campaign website: www.dereksloan.ca
Campaign slogan: Conservative. Without Apology
Campaign slogan (French): Conservateur Sans Se Dérober

Endorsements of Derek Sloan

MPs:
Senators:
Provincial politicians:
Municipal politicians:
Former MPs: (2)

- Eric Lowther (MP for Calgary Centre, 1997-2000)
- Brad Trost (MP for Saskatoon—University, 2004–2019)

Former Senators:
Former provincial politicians:
Former municipal politicians:
Other prominent individuals: (2)

- Richard Décarie (Former Deputy Chief of Staff to then-Opposition Leader Stephen Harper; former Chief of Staff & Senior Advisor to then-Premier Jean Charest; Conservative Party of Canada leadership contestant, 2020)
- Ezra Levant (Founder of Rebel Media)

Organizations: (2)

- Campaign Life Coalition
- REAL Women of Canada

Total endorsements: 6

=== Withdrew or failed to qualify ===
==== Failed to qualify as authorized contestants ====
Approved applicants who failed to pass the second qualification stage that required 2,000 signatures and the submission of the full $100,000 compliance fee and at least $50,000 of the entrance fee by March 25, 2020, or who disqualified between Stage 1 and Stage 2.

===== Marilyn Gladu =====
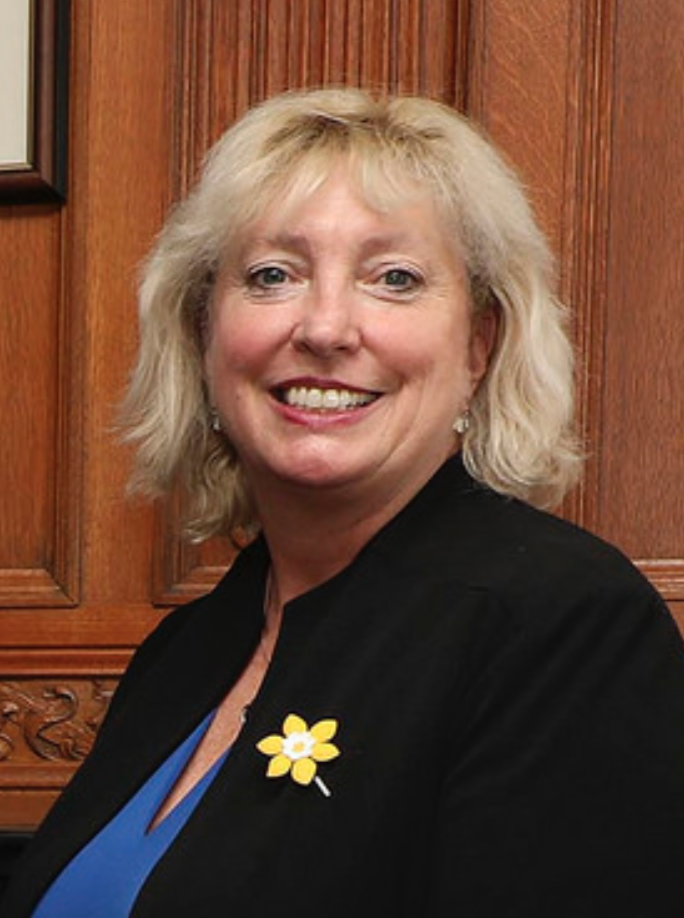
Marilyn Gladu

Background

Marilyn Gladu, 57, is the MP for Sarnia—Lambton (2015–present), and was the Shadow Minister of Health (2017–2020), Shadow Minister of Science (2015–2017). Prior to entering politics, she was an engineer for Dow Chemical.

Candidacy announced: January 9, 2020
Candidacy suspended: March 25, 2020
Date registered with Elections Canada:
Campaign website: https://www.marilyngladu.ca

===== Rudy Husny =====
Background

Rudy Husny is Director of Stakeholder Relations in the Office of the Leader of the Official Opposition and candidate in Outremont in 2011 and 2015.

Candidacy announced: February 8, 2020
Candidacy suspended: March 19, 2020

Withdrew due to tight election timeline and rules. Husny cited the ongoing COVID-19 pandemic crisis as his stated reason for suspending his campaign, saying it is just not right to ask people for money during a public health emergency.

Date registered with Elections Canada:
Campaign website:

===== Jim Karahalios =====
Background

Jim Karahalios is a corporate lawyer and founder of activist groups "Axe The Carbon Tax" and "Take Back Our PC Party". He sued the Ontario PC party after narrowly losing an election in November 2018 for party president, but the case has not yet been tried. He is accusing the Ontario PC party of ballot stuffing in that election.

Karahalios obtained the required 3,000 verified signatures and collected $300,000 for the entrance fee, but CPC officers refused to put his name on the ballot. The exact reasons for Karahalios's disqualification were not released. Karahalios contested the disqualification in court. On May 20, 2020, the Ontario Superior Court of Justice reinstated his candidacy. The judge's decision was made on the basis that the subcommittee which disqualified Karahalios did not have the authority to do so. The day after Karahalios was reinstated as a candidate, he was disqualified by the leadership election organizing committee (LEOC), a body which the judge stated had the authority to disqualify candidates.

Candidacy announced: January 28, 2020
Disqualified: March 20, 2020
Reinstated by court: March 20, 2020
Disqualified: May 21, 2020
Date registered with Elections Canada:
Campaign website: Jim Karahalios for Conservative Party Leader

Endorsements of Jim Karahalios

Organizations: Campaign Life Coalition

===== Rick Peterson =====
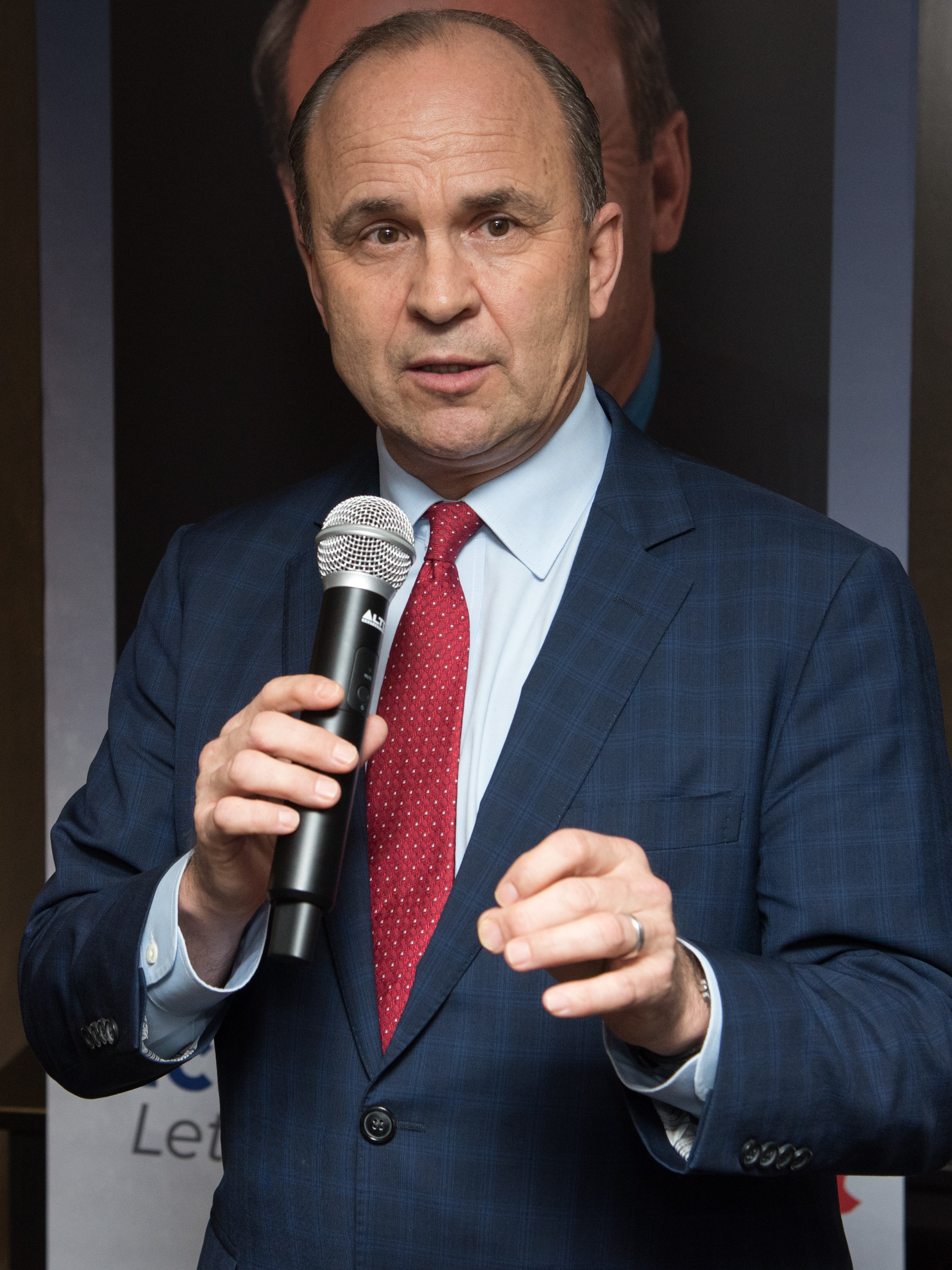
Rick Peterson

Background

Rick Peterson, 71, is a venture capitalist, party fundraiser, principal of Peterson Capital, and a former candidate for leadership of the British Columbia Conservative Party. He was a member of the Progressive Conservatives at the time of the merger. He ran and placed 12th in the 2017 Conservative leadership election.

Candidacy announced: January 22, 2020
Candidacy suspended: March 20, 2020

Withdrew due to tight election timeline and rules. Peterson also cited the ongoing COVID-19 pandemic crisis as his stated reason for suspending his campaign. Endorsed Peter MacKay.

Date registered with Elections Canada:
Campaign website: rickcpc.ca

Endorsements of Rick Peterson

Senators:

- Stephen Greene (Senator for Halifax-The Citadel, Nova Scotia)

Former provincial politicians:

- Lorne Mayencourt (Peterson's campaign manager; BC MLA for Vancouver-Burrard 2001-2008)

Other prominent individuals:

- Mark Mullins (economist; former executive director of Fraser Institute)

==== Failed to qualify as approved applicants ====
Declared candidates who failed to pass the first qualification stage by obtaining at least 1,000 signatures, submit at least $25,000 of the entrance fee by 27 February 2020 and/or pass the vetting process.

===== Richard Décarie =====
Background

Richard Décarie, 67, was the Deputy Chief of Staff to then-Opposition Leader Stephen Harper and Chief of Staff & Senior Advisor to then-Premier Jean Charest.

Candidacy announced: January 30, 2020
Notes
Décarie advocated for social conservative values. "I think 'LGBTQ' is a Liberal term. I don't talk about people that way, I talk about persons, and I think we all need the full respect for being a human being." When asked by an interviewer whether "being gay" was a "choice" or not, Décarie said that it was. This answer lead to calls by Kory Teneycke, a former senior aide to both Stephen Harper and Doug Ford, that he be barred from running. Décarie acquired the required number of signatures and paid the deposit but was disqualified by the party following his interview with the nomination committee. Endorsed Derek Sloan.

===== Clayton Knutzon =====
Background

Clayton Knutzon is a former Freedom Conservative Party candidate in Alberta.

Candidacy announced: December 22, 2019

===== Bobby Singh =====
Background

Bobby Singh is a Toronto businessman and the former CPC candidate for Scarborough—Rouge Park, Ontario in the 2019 election. Endorsed Peter MacKay.

Candidacy announced: January 15, 2020

===== Irvin Studin =====
Background

Irvin Studin is a senior fellow at the University of Toronto's Munk School of Global Affairs and Public Policy, a Rhodes Scholar, former professional soccer player with the Toronto Lynx, and served in the Privy Council Office between 2002 and 2006.

Candidacy announced: February 25, 2020

==== Withdrawn prior to February 27, 2020 ====
===== Bryan Brulotte =====
Background

CEO and chair of employment firm MaxSys Staffing and Consulting (1993–present), deputy chief of staff to Paul Dick (1993), Progressive Conservative candidate for Lanark-Carleton in 2000.

Candidacy announced: December 16, 2019
Candidacy suspended: January 14, 2020
Campaign Website: www.bryanbrulotte.ca
Notes

Withdrew following the release of the leadership election rules. Endorsed Peter MacKay.

===== Aron Seal =====
Aron Seal, a former policy advisor to Prime Minister Stephen Harper, Director of Policy for Tony Clement and Jim Flaherty.

Candidacy announced: October 22, 2019
Candidacy suspended: February 25, 2020
Campaign website: www.millennialconservative.ca
Notes

Withdrew saying that new signature requirements and deadlines were "designed to keep outsider candidates out". Endorsed Rudy Husny.

=== Declined ===
- Rona Ambrose – Interim Leader of the CPC and Leader of the Official Opposition (2015–2017), MP for Sturgeon River—Parkland (2015–2017) and Edmonton—Spruce Grove, Alberta (2004–2015), Minister of Health (2013–2015), Minister of Public Works and Government Services (2010–2013), Minister of Labour (2008–2010), Minister of Intergovernmental Affairs (2007–2008), Minister of the Environment (2006–2007)
- John Baird – MP for Ottawa West—Nepean, Ontario (2006–2015), Minister of Foreign Affairs (2011–2015), Leader of the Government in the House of Commons (2010–2011), Minister of the Environment (2007–2008, 2010–2011), Minister of Transport (2008–2010), President of the Treasury Board, (2006–2007), Ontario Progressive Conservative Party MPP (1995–2005) and provincial cabinet minister (1999–2003).
- Candice Bergen – Opposition House Leader (2016–2020), Shadow Minister for Natural Resources (2015–2016), Minister of State for Social Development (2013–2015), MP for Portage—Lisgar, Manitoba (2008–2023)
- Maxime Bernier – Leader of the People's Party (2018–present), Shadow Minister of Innovation, Science and Economic Development (2015–2016, 2017–2018), Minister of State for Small Business, Tourism and Agriculture (2011–2015), Minister of Foreign Affairs (2007–2008), and Minister of Industry (2006–2007), MP for Beauce, Quebec (2006–2019), placed second in the 2017 Conservative leadership election
- Jean Charest – Premier of Quebec (2003–2012), Leader of the Quebec Liberal Party (1998–2012), Leader of the Progressive Conservative Party of Canada (1993–1998), Deputy Prime Minister of Canada (1993), Minister of the Environment (1991–1993), MP for Sherbrooke (1984–1998)
- Michael Chong – Shadow Minister of Democratic Institutions (2019–2020), Shadow Minister of Science (2018–2019), Shadow Minister of Infrastructure and Communities (2017–2018), Shadow Minister of Urban Affairs (2017–2018), Deputy Shadow Minister of the Environment (2015–2016), Minister of Intergovernmental Affairs (2006), Minister of State (Sport) (2006), MP for Wellington—Halton Hills, Ontario (2004–present), placed fifth in the 2017 Conservative leadership election
- Christy Clark – Premier of British Columbia (2011–2017), Leader of the British Columbia Liberal Party (2011–2017)
- Gérard Deltell – Shadow Minister of Intergovernmental Affairs (2019–2020), Shadow President of the Treasury Board (2017–2019), Shadow Minister of Finance (2016–2017), Shadow Minister of Employment, Workforce Development, and Labour (2015–2016), MP for Louis-Saint-Laurent, Quebec (2015–present), Quebec MNA for Chauveau (2008–2015) and leader of the Action démocratique du Québec (2009–2012)
- Mario Dumont - Leader of the Official Opposition of Québec (2007–2008), Leader of the Action Démocratique du Québec (1994–2009), MNA for Rivière-du-Loup (1994–2009). Endorsed MacKay
- Michael Fortier – Minister of International Trade (2008), Minister of Public Works and Government Services (2006–2008), Senator from Quebec (2006–2008), placed fifth in the 1998 Progressive Conservative leadership election
- Vincenzo Guzzo – Entrepreneur, philanthropist, and television personality (Dragons' Den); CEO of Cinémas Guzzo, Groupe Guzzo Construction Inc., Guzzo Medical and Guzzo Hospitality
- Stephen Harper – Prime Minister of Canada (2006–2015), Leader of the Conservative Party of Canada (2004–2015), Leader of the Canadian Alliance (2002–2003), MP for Calgary Southwest/Calgary Heritage (2002–2016), MP for Calgary West (1993–1997)
- Jason Kenney – Premier of Alberta (2019–2022), Leader of the United Conservative Party (2017–2022), Leader of the Progressive Conservative Association of Alberta (2017), and Alberta MLA for Calgary-Lougheed (2017–2022), Minister of National Defence (2015), Minister of Employment and Social Development (2013–2015), Minister of Citizenship, Immigration and Multiculturalism (2008–2013), MP for Calgary Midnapore, Alberta (2015–2016) and Calgary Southeast, Alberta (1997–2015). Initially endorsed Ambrose; after she declined to enter the race, endorsed O'Toole.
- Bernard Lord – Premier of New Brunswick (1999–2006), Leader of the Progressive Conservative Party of New Brunswick (1997–2006)
- Caroline Mulroney – Ontario Minister of Transportation (2019–2023), Ontario Minister of Francophone Affairs (2018–present), Attorney General of Ontario (2018–2019), Ontario MPP for York—Simcoe (2018–present), daughter of former Prime Minister Brian Mulroney. Endorsed MacKay.
- Pierre Poilievre – Shadow Minister of Finance (2017–2021), Shadow Minister of Employment, Workforce Development, and Labour (2016–2017), Shadow President of Treasury Board (2015–2016), Minister of Employment and Social Development (2015), Minister for Democratic Reform (2013–2015), MP for Carleton, Ontario (2015–2025) and Nepean—Carleton, Ontario (2004–2015) Though expected to announce his candidacy on 26 January and reported to have formed a campaign team including John Baird as campaign chair and Leo Housakos as Quebec organizer, Poilievre announced on 23 January that he would not run for the leadership.
- Lisa Raitt – Deputy Leader of the CPC and Deputy Leader of the Official Opposition (2017–2019), Shadow Minister of Finance (2015–2016), Minister of Transport (2013–2015), Minister of Labour (2010–2013), Minister of Natural Resources (2008–2010), President and CEO of the Toronto Port Authority (2002–2008), MP for Milton, Ontario (2015–2019) and Halton, Ontario (2008–2015), placed eighth in the 2017 Conservative leadership election
- Michelle Rempel Garner – Shadow Minister of Industry and Economic Development (2019–2020), Shadow Minister of Immigration, Refugees, and Citizenship (2015–2019), Minister of Western Economic Diversification (2013–2015), MP for Calgary Nose Hill, Alberta (2015–present) and Calgary Centre-North, Alberta (2011–2015).
- Brad Trost – Shadow Minister of Canada–U.S. Relations (2015–2016), MP for Saskatoon—University, Saskatchewan (2015–2019) and Saskatoon—Humboldt, Saskatchewan (2004–2015), placed fourth in the 2017 Conservative leadership election Initially endorsed Décarie; after Décarie was disqualified, endorsed Sloan and Lewis.
- Brad Wall – Premier of Saskatchewan (2007–2018), Leader of the Saskatchewan Party (2004–2018). Endorsed Ambrose.
- John Williamson – MP for New Brunswick Southwest (2011–2015, 2019–present), director of communications for the Prime Minister's Office under Stephen Harper, national director of the Canadian Taxpayers Federation (2004–2008).

== Fundraising ==
2020 Conservative Party of Canada leadership election - Donors
Period	Peter MacKay	Erin O'Toole	Leslyn Lewis	Derek Sloan
Q1	3,355	4,174	2,941	2,478
Q2	6,369	7,510	8,413	2,754
Total	9,724	11,684	11,354	5,232

2020 Conservative Party of Canada leadership election - Fundraising
Period	Peter MacKay	Erin O'Toole	Leslyn Lewis	Derek Sloan
Q1	$1,045,851	$784,997	$447,646	$410,263
Q2	$1,160,000	$1,250,000	$996,000	$329,000
Total	$2,205,851	$2,034,997	$1,443,646	$739,263

2020 Conservative Party of Canada leadership election - Most Donated to Candidate by Province
Period	Peter MacKay	Erin O'Toole	Leslyn Lewis	Derek Sloan
Q1	New Brunswick; Newfoundland and Labrador; Nova Scotia; Manitoba; Quebec	Alberta; British Columbia; Ontario	Prince Edward Island; Saskatchewan; The territories	
Q2	Manitoba; New Brunswick; Newfoundland and Labrador; Nova Scotia; The territories	Alberta; Quebec; Ontario	British Columbia; Prince Edward Island; Saskatchewan	
Total	TBD	TBD	TBD	TBD

During the first quarter Marilyn Gladu raised $94,734, Rick Peterson raised $35,598 and Rudy Husny raised $28,941. They withdrew from the leadership race during the first quarter. Jim Karahalios raised $294,522 from 1,700 donors, but was disqualified.

Some numbers for the second quarter (April to the end of June 2020) were obtained by The Globe and Mail and confirmed with the campaigns. The Conservative Party has not confirmed any numbers for the second quarter. Finalized numbers must be submitted to Elections Canada at the end of July and should be available some time after.

== Opinion polling ==
=== After candidate registration deadline ===
==== Conservative Party members ====
Polling firm/link	Last date of polling	Sample size	Margin of error	Peter MacKay	Erin O'Toole	Leslyn Lewis	Derek Sloan	Undecided	Notes
Mainstreet/iPolitics	August 14–15, 2020	5,267	± 1.3%	41%	32%	16%	11%		
Mainstreet/iPolitics	May 20–21, 2020	7,958	± 1.1%	39%	31%	10%	6%	14%	
Mainstreet/iPolitics	May 12, 2020	6,624	± 2.62%	40%	34%	9%	5%	13%	

==== Conservative Party supporters ====
Polling firm/link	Last date of polling	Sample size	Margin of error	Peter MacKay	Erin O'Toole	Leslyn Lewis	Derek Sloan	Undecided	Notes
Maru/Blue	July 28, 2020	1,828	± 2.6%	55%	23%	11%	11%	--	
Léger	June 21, 2020	351	± 2.51%	30%	10%	8%	5%	47%	
Abacus Data	May 21, 2020	1,800	± 2.3%	69%	31%	--	--	--	Did not include Lewis and Sloan.

==== All Canadians ====
Polling firm/link	Last date of polling	Sample size	Margin of error	Peter MacKay	Erin O'Toole	Leslyn Lewis	Derek Sloan	Undecided	Notes
Maru/Blue	July 28, 2020	1,514	± 2.9%	51%	25%	16%	8%	--	
Léger	June 21, 2020	1,521	± 2.51%	18%	5%	4%	2%	70%	
Abacus Data	May 21, 2020	1,800	± 2.3%	61%	39%	--	--	--	Did not include Lewis and Sloan.

=== Conservative Party supporters ===
Polling firm/link	Last date of polling	Sample size	Margin of error	Rona Ambrose	Stephen Harper	Peter MacKay	Jason Kenney	Jean Charest	Pierre Poilievre	Michelle Rempel Garner	Gérard Deltell	John Tory	Erin O'Toole	John Baird	Vincenzo Guzzo	Michael Fortier	Other	Undecided	Notes
Léger	March 4, 2020	382	± 2.5%	--	--	38%	--	--	--	--	--	--	9%	--	--	--	6%	47%	--
Léger	February 1, 2020	402	± 2.53%	--	--	42%	--	--	--	6%	--	--	4%	--	--	--	3%	45%	Gladu 2% Décarie 1%
Léger	January 7, 2020	392	± 2.49%	18%	18%	12%	6%	4%	4%	3%	2%	2%	1%	1%	1%	1%	--	29%	--
EKOS Research	December 17, 2019	340	± 5.3%	27.8%	12.3%	14.6%	4.0%	–	0.9%*	8.0%	0.0%*	1.6%	0.9%	2.4%	–	0.0%*	19.8%*	7.6%	*Includes write-ins

==== All Canadians ====
Polling firm/link	Last date of polling	Sample size	Margin of error	Rona Ambrose	Peter MacKay	Caroline Mulroney	John Tory	Stephen Harper	Michelle Rempel Garner	Lisa Raitt	Pierre Poilievre	Kevin O'Leary	Jason Kenney	Brad Wall	Michael Chong	Bernard Lord	Other	Undecided	Notes
Léger	March 4, 2020	1,540	± 2.5%	--	25%	--	--	--	--	--	--	--	--	--	--	--	14%	63%	O'Toole 4% Peterson 2% Gladu 2% Décarie 2% Lewis 1% Sloan 1% Karahalios 1% Husny 1%
Léger	February 1, 2020	1,501	± 2.53%	--	28%	--	--	--	4%	--	--	--	--	--	--	--	8%	60%	O'Toole 3% Gladu 3% Décarie 2%
Léger	January 7, 2020	1,557	± 2.49%	10%	7%	–	4%	9%	1%	–	2%	–	3%	–	–	–	12%	51%	–
EKOS Research	December 17, 2019	1,543	± 2.5%	19.3%	11.8%	8.0%	6.3%	5.2%	3.5%	0.3%*	0.5%*	–	2.1%	0.2%*	3.9%	0.4%*	17.0%	22.9%	*Write ins
Angus Reid	December 11, 2019	4,516	± 1.0%	27%	21%	9%	–	–	9%	8%	8%	7%	7%	6%	5%	5%	–	0%	Respondents could pick up to 3 choices

== See also ==
- 2020 Green Party of Canada leadership election
