= Derek Sloan =

Canadian politician

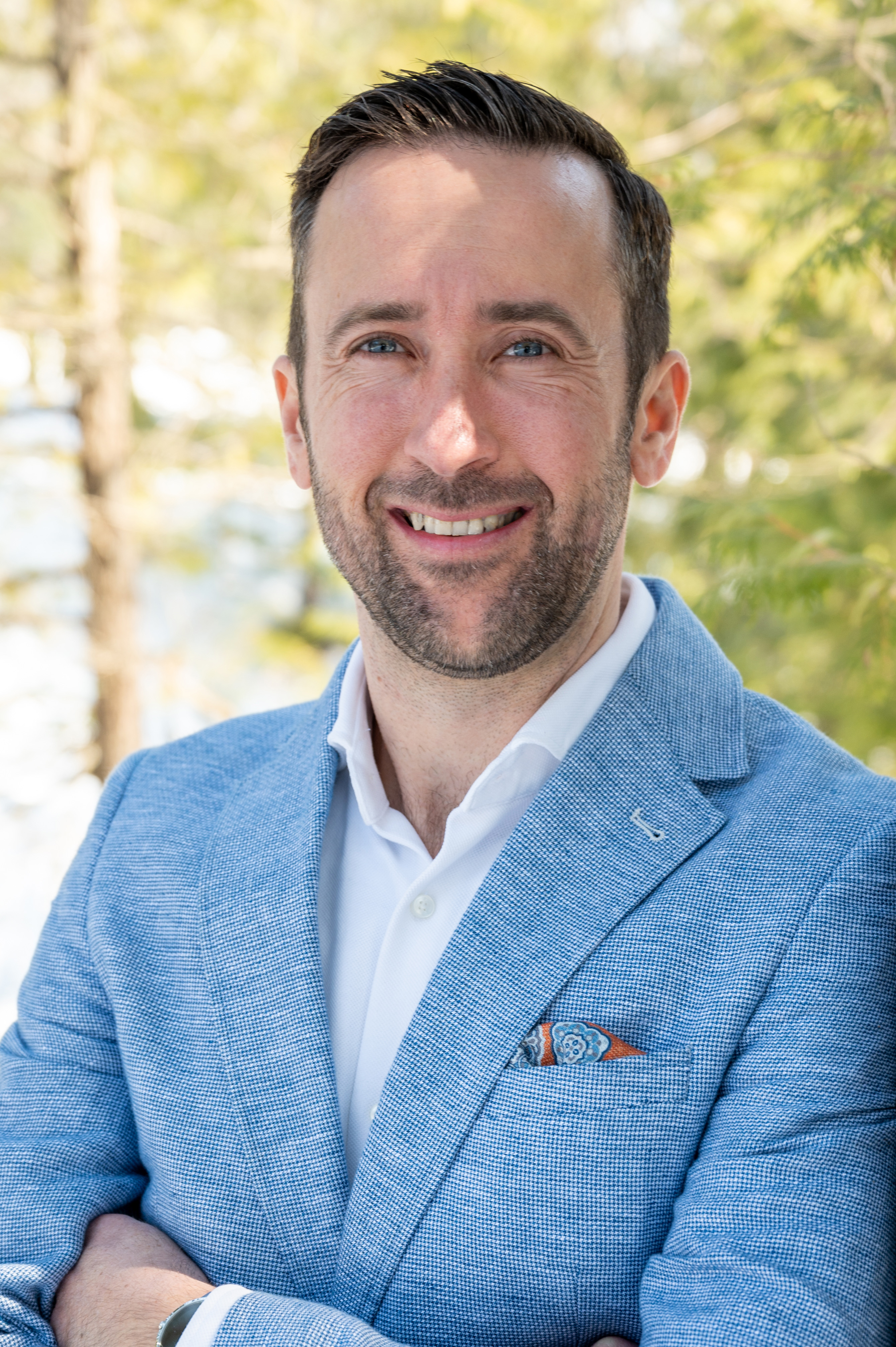
- Sloan in 2022

Leader of the Ontario Party
- Incumbent
- Assumed office December 14, 2021
- Preceded by: Joel Shepheard

Member of Parliament for Hastings—Lennox and Addington
- In office October 21, 2019 – September 20, 2021
- Preceded by: Mike Bossio
- Succeeded by: Shelby Kramp-Neuman

Personal details
- Born: November 11, 1984 (age 42) Norfolk County, Ontario, Canada
- Party: Ontario (since 2021)
- Other political affiliations: Independent (Jan–Dec 2021); Conservative (until 2021)
- Spouse: Jennifer Sloan
- Children: 3
- Education: Pacific Union College (BBA); Queen's University (JD)
- Profession: Lawyer

Derek Nathaniel Sloan (born November 11, 1984) is a Canadian politician who represented the riding of Hastings—Lennox and Addington from 2019 to 2021. Shortly after being elected to the House of Commons of Canada in the 2019 Canadian federal election, Sloan ran as a candidate for the Conservative Party leadership in 2020 and was eliminated after the first ballot. He has received national news coverage for his controversial views on LGBTQ issues, and making allegedly racist remarks. Sloan has publicly stated that he condemns racism.

On January 20, 2021, Sloan was expelled from the Conservative Party caucus after it was revealed that he had received a donation from white supremacist and perennial political candidate Paul Fromm. Sloan accused the Party of hypocrisy, stating that Paul Fromm had voted as a member of the Conservative Party without raising any red flags, saying "They are now trying to kick me out of the party for not having some excessive standard of scrutiny that they don't even have themselves". Party leader Erin O'Toole explained that the decision had been made "because of a pattern of destructive behaviour involving multiple incidents."

In the 2021 Canadian federal election, Sloan ran in the Banff—Airdrie riding as an independent, and finished fifth. Soon after he became the leader of the Ontario Party and stood for the party in the riding of Hastings—Lennox and Addington in the 2022 Ontario general election, finishing fourth.

== Background ==
Sloan was born in 1984 and raised near Waterford, Ontario. He attended Kingsway College, a private Seventh-day Adventist Church-affiliated high school in Oshawa.

In 2003, Sloan enrolled at Pacific Union College, a private university in Napa Valley, California associated with the Seventh-day Adventist Church. There he completed a bachelor's degree in business in 2007. While attending Pacific Union, Sloan served as president of the university's student association in 2007.

After graduating, Sloan moved to Toronto, Ontario to work at a water-fuel systems company. Subsequently, he ran Sloan's Furniture Liquidation in Oshawa from 2011 to 2014. In 2014, Sloan began a law degree at Queen's University in Kingston, Ontario; he finished articling in 2018. Sloan has said he pursued law because he was interested in "defending religious liberties against political correctness."

Sloan and his wife Jennifer have two daughters and a son.

== Political career ==
=== 2019 federal election ===
In 2018, Sloan announced that he would seek the Conservative Party of Canada's nomination for the riding of Hastings—Lennox and Addington. At the nomination meeting, Sloan defeated three other candidates: a city councillor who had served for fifteen years in Belleville, a lawyer who had lived in the area for twenty years, and a local business owner. Sloan defeated one-term Liberal incumbent Mike Bossio in the 2019 federal election, becoming the first Seventh-day Adventist ever elected to the Canadian House of Commons.

=== 2020 Conservative Party leadership election ===
Sloan announced his candidacy for the 2020 Conservative Party of Canada leadership election on January 22, 2020. On January 27, Sloan made national headlines after tweeting in response to fellow leadership candidate Richard Décarie that the cause of sexual orientation is scientifically complicated, and that Mr. Décarie beliefs should not disqualify him from the Conservative Leadership Race. Sloan's comments were criticized by his former election campaign manager, Eric Lorenzen.

A self-identified social conservative, Sloan attracted controversy for the policy positions he endorsed throughout the leadership race. Sloan stated that were he elected leader he would permit Conservative MPs to reopen the debate on abortion or introduce private members’ bills aimed at overturning same-sex marriage. He also voiced opposition to Bill C-16, which protects people from discrimination on the basis of gender identity. He also vowed to vote against a federal ban on the pseudoscientific practice of conversion therapy, arguing that parents should be able to make children identify with the body they are born with. Sloan has been widely criticized in the media and even within the Conservative Party for these views.

On February 6, 2020, members of the Mohawks of the Bay of Quinte blockaded the Canadian National Railway north of Tyendinaga, in support the Wetʼsuwetʼen hereditary chiefs' opposition to the Coastal GasLink Pipeline within Sloan's riding of Hastings—Lennox and Addington. Sloan spoke publicly about the blockade for the first time on February 18, stating the Liberal government should have responded faster to the protests. Three days later, Sloan characterized the protesters as "radical extremists" and called on the Ontario Provincial Police to enforce an injunction to remove the blockade.

On April 21, 2020, Sloan tweeted a video in which he asked whether Canada's Chief Medical Officer Theresa Tam worked "for Canada or for China?" Sloan's comments singled out Theresa Tam, a Chinese Canadian, and were denounced as racist on social media; Prime Minister Justin Trudeau called them intolerant, saying they had no place in Canada, and several fellow Conservative MPs denounced them as personal attacks. Conservative Party leader Andrew Scheer initially declined to comment on Sloan's remarks, but stated that it was "inappropriate to question someone's loyalty to their country" the following week. The municipality of Hastings County condemned Sloan's remarks as "cruel and racist" and unrepresentative of the people of his riding, before calling on him to be expelled from the Conservative Party. Sloan said the following day that he would not apologize, because "the idea people would think it was racist was not even on my mind. I would have said those statements about any public health officer that made those decisions in her spot." The Chinese Canadian National Council (SJ) submitted a letter to the Conservative Party demanding that Sloan be expelled from the party's caucus and denied the opportunity to run for its leadership. In an emergency session on April 29, 2020, Conservative MPs demanded Sloan apologize for his statements. In a statement on April 29, Sloan said his comments were "rhetorical" but declined to retract them.

In the leadership election, Sloan placed last on the first ballot and was subsequently eliminated after winning 14.39% of first-ballot points.

=== Post-leadership election ===
Shortly after Erin O'Toole won the leadership, Liberal MP Pam Damoff called for Sloan's expulsion from the Conservative caucus. Sloan called it part of the Liberals' electoral strategy, while O'Toole declined to say whether or not he would expel him from caucus. Despite a petition launched by anti-abortion organization Campaign Life Coalition for his inclusion, O'Toole did not include Sloan in his Shadow Cabinet.

During a campaign webinar on June 4, 2020, Sloan accused Justin Trudeau of "effectively putting into law child abuse" by proposing a ban on conversion therapy. Bay of Quinte PRIDE denounced Sloan's comments as "vile" and stated that Sloan was failing to adequately represent his LGBTQ constituents. Fellow leadership candidate Peter MacKay likewise denounced Sloan's remarks as reprehensible.

In October 2020, Sloan voted against a bill banning various forms of conversion therapy. He claimed that the bill would outlaw prayer and "amounts to child abuse", using it for fundraising purposes following the vote. Sloan signed an E-petition that raised questions about the safety of a future coronavirus vaccine. When asked about the e-petition, he stated that it had "good points".

==== Expulsion from Conservative caucus ====
On January 18, 2021, O'Toole announced plans to remove Sloan from the Conservative Party caucus (of Conservative Members of Parliament) after it was revealed that Sloan unknowingly accepted a donation of $131 from white nationalist Paul Fromm. Sloan received the money (donated under the name "Frederick P. Fromm") during the 2020 leadership campaign. Upon learning of the donation, Sloan asked the Conservative Party to arrange for its return to Fromm. He also pointed out on social media that the Conservative party had taken a ten percent cut of the donation. O'Toole also stated that Sloan would not be allowed to run as a Conservative candidate in the next federal election. The party also investigated his use of robocalls during his leadership campaign. Sloan was voted out of the Conservative caucus on January 20, 2021. The vote occurred pursuant to provisions of the Reform Act.

Before that decision was made, the Party had issued a statement that "Sloan's campaign ... sold the party membership to Fromm". In a statement on January 20, 2021, Erin O'Toole explained that Sloan's acceptance of a donation from a white nationalist was just one factor of many that led to the ouster:

"The Conservative caucus voted to remove Derek Sloan not because of one specific event, but because of a pattern of destructive behaviour involving multiple incidents and disrespect towards the Conservative team for over a year."

==== Post-expulsion ====
Following his expulsion from the Conservative Party, Sloan has travelled across Ontario to speak at protests and demonstrations against public health measures enacted in response to the COVID-19 pandemic. On April 24, 2021, Sloan spoke at an anti-lockdown protest in Barrie where he recommended that the government explore treating COVID-19 using Vitamin D. The following day Sloan, Ontario MPP Randy Hillier, and other demonstrators attended a service at the Church of God in Aylmer in defiance of the Reopening Ontario Act, which limits in-person religious gatherings to ten people. Sloan has also attended demonstrations in Ottawa, Peterborough, Stratford, and Chatham. Sloan was charged in relation to the event in Aylmer and has been investigated by Belleville police regarding a gathering at Zwicks Park.

In July 2021, Sloan announced his plan to form a new political party. In August 2021, soon after the 44th federal election was called, he announced that he would contest the Alberta riding of Banff—Airdrie as an independent. He came fifth while the Conservative incumbent, Blake Richards, was re-elected.

=== Ontario provincial politics ===
In December 2021, Sloan was announced as the new leader of the Ontario Party, intending to contest the 2022 Ontario general election.

== Electoral record ==
2025 Ontario general election
Party	Candidate	Votes	%	±%
Progressive Conservative	Ric Bresee	20,249	48.58	+1.03
Liberal	Lynn Rigby	12,398	29.75	+11.15
New Democratic	Jessica Zielke	4,810	11.54	–7.47
Ontario Party	Derek Sloan	2,318	5.56	–1.79
Green	Mike Holbrook	1,376	3.30	–1.24
New Blue	Glenn Tyrrell	528	1.27	–1.69
Total valid votes		41,679	99.21	–0.33
Total rejected, unmarked and declined ballots		335	0.79	+0.33
Turnout		42,014		
Eligible voters				
Progressive Conservative hold		Swing		–5.06
Source: Elections Ontario

2022 Ontario general election: Hastings—Lennox and Addington
Party	Candidate	Votes	%	±%	Expenditures
Progressive Conservative	Ric Bresee	18,156	47.55	–2.71	$66,705
New Democratic	Eric DePoe	7,258	19.01	–13.43	$45,142
Liberal	Ted Darby	7,102	18.60	+6.96	$31,699
Ontario Party	Derek Sloan	2,807	7.35	–	$0
Green	Christina Wilson	1,732	4.54	+0.21	$0
New Blue	Joyce Reid	1,129	2.96	–	$3,466
Total valid votes/expense limit		38,184	99.54	–	$114,855
Total rejected, unmarked and declined ballots		178	0.46	–0.56	
Turnout		38,362	47.12	–11.99	
Eligible voters		81,418			
Progressive Conservative hold		Swing		+5.36	
Source: Elections Ontario

2021 Canadian federal election: Banff—Airdrie
Party	Candidate	Votes	%	±%	Expenditures
Conservative	Blake Richards	43,677	56.73	–14.36	$82,283.53
New Democratic	Sarah Zagoda	12,482	16.21	+5.73	$5,649.63
Liberal	David Gamble	9,572	12.43	+1.64	$27,675.24
People's	Nadine Wellwood	5,808	7.54	+4.14	$25,373.84
No Affiliation	Derek Sloan	2,020	2.62	–	$124,282.97
Maverick	Tariq Elnaga	1,475	1.92	–	$17,960.91
Green	Aidan Blum	1,405	1.82	–2.43	none listed
Independent	Caroline O'Driscoll	489	0.64	–	$10,142.91
Independent	Ron Voss	60	0.08	–	none listed
Total valid votes/expense limit		76,988	99.49	–	$141,669.12
Total rejected ballots		396	0.51	+0.01	
Turnout		77,384	68.78	–3.70	
Eligible voters		112,509			
Conservative hold		Swing		–10.05	
Source: Elections Canada

2020 Conservative Party of Canada leadership results by ballot
Candidate	1st ballot				2nd ballot				3rd ballot			
Candidate	Votes cast	%	Points allocated	%	Votes cast	%	Points allocated	%	Votes cast	%	Points allocated	%
Erin O'Toole	51,258	29.39%	10,681.40	31.60%	56,907	33.20%	11,903.69	35.22%	90,635	58.86%	19,271.74	57.02%
Peter MacKay	52,851	30.30%	11,328.55	33.52%	54,165	31.60%	11,756.01	34.78%	63,356	41.14%	14,528.26	42.98%
Leslyn Lewis	43,017	24.67%	6,925.38	20.49%	60,316	35.20%	10,140.30	30.00%	Eliminated			
Derek Sloan	27,278	15.64%	4,864.67	14.39%	Eliminated							
Total	174,404	100%	33,800	100%	171,388	100%	33,800	100%	153,991	100%	33,800	100%

2019 Canadian federal election: Hastings—Lennox and Addington
Party	Candidate	Votes	%	±%	Expenditures
Conservative	Derek Sloan	21,968	41.4	-0.5	$34,287.91
Liberal	Mike Bossio	19,721	37.1	-5.3	$103,242.32
New Democratic	David Tough	6,984	13.2	+0.5	$4,351.46
Green	Sari Watson	3,114	5.87	+3.0	none listed
People's	Adam L. E. Gray	1,307	2.46		$1,020.01
Total valid votes/expense limit		53,094	100.0		
Total rejected ballots		352			
Turnout		53,446	66.7		
Eligible voters		80,079			
Conservative gain from Liberal		Swing		+2.40	
Source: Elections Canada
