= 2014 Lennox and Addington County municipal elections =

Local election in Ontario, Canada

Elections were held in Lennox and Addington County, Ontario on October 27, 2014 in conjunction with municipal elections across the province.

== Lennox and Addington County Council ==
The County Council consists of the three municipal reeves, mayor of Greater Napanee and the three deputy reeves and the Deputy Reeve of Greater Napanee.

| Position | Elected |
|---|---|
| Addington Highlands Reeve | Henry Hogg |
| Addington Highlands Deputy Reeve | Selected from council |
| Greater Napanee Mayor | Gordon Schermerhorn |
| Greater Napanee Deputy Mayor | Marg Isbester |
| Loyalist Mayor | Bill Lowry |
| Loyalist Deputy Mayor | Richard Bresee (acclaimed) |
| Stone Mills Reeve | Clarence Kennedy |
| Stone Mills Deputy Reeve | Eric Smith (acclaimed) |

== Addington Highlands ==
| Reeve Candidate | Vote | % |
|---|---|---|
| Henry Hogg (X) | 923 | 71.77 |
| Gerry Bray | 363 | 28.23 |

== Greater Napanee ==
| Mayoral Candidate | Vote | % |
|---|---|---|
| Gordon Schermerhorn (X) | 2,907 | 50.03 |
| Robert Dorey | 2,904 | 49.97 |

== Loyalist ==
| Mayoral Candidate | Vote | % |
|---|---|---|
| Bill Lowry (X) | 2,801 | 74.20 |
| Rob Purvis | 974 | 25.80 |

== Stone Mills ==
| Reeve Candidate | Vote | % |
|---|---|---|
| Clarence Kennedy | 1,726 | 55.21 |
| Todd Steele | 1,400 | 44.79 |
