= Shelby Kramp-Neuman =

Canadian Conservative Member of Parliament

Shelby Kramp-Neuman MP
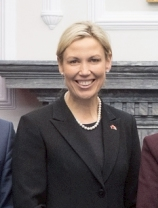
- Shelby Kramp-Neuman in 2026

Member of Parliament for Hastings—Lennox and Addington—Tyendinaga Hastings-Lennox and Addington (2021–2025)
- Incumbent
- Assumed office September 20, 2021
- Preceded by: Derek Sloan

Personal details
- Born: May 14, 1978 (age 48)
- Party: Conservative
- Spouse: Tadum Neuman (m. 2006)
- Relations: Daryl Kramp (father)
- Children: 2
- Education: University of Ottawa

Shelby Kramp-Neuman MP (née Kramp; born May 14, 1978) is a Canadian politician. She was elected as the Member of Parliament for the federal electoral district of Hastings—Lennox and Addington in the House of Commons of Canada at the 2021 Canadian federal election.

== Personal life ==
Kramp-Neuman was raised in Madoc, Ontario. She was educated at the University of Ottawa where she studied Communications and Political Science.

Kramp-Neuman is married and has two children. She is the daughter of former MP and Ontario MPP Daryl Kramp.

== Career ==
Kramp-Neuman has worked as a financial advisor for Sun Life Financial. She has also worked for over five years as a teacher at Loyalist College and with the Hastings & Prince Edward District School Board.

She has worked as a legislative assistant for Jim Prentice and Senator Consiglio Di Nino.

Kramp-Neuman has served three terms on the Centre Hastings Municipal Council, including as the Deputy Mayor.

She was elected as the federal MP for Hastings—Lennox and Addington in 2021, as a member of the Conservative Party. She was re-elected in 2025.

=== Federal political ===
In June 2026, Pierre Poilievre appointed Kramp-Neuman as Ontario Special Advisor in the Official Opposition Shadow Cabinet.

Kramp-Neuman has opposed development of the Government of Canada's proposed Alto (high-speed rail) network. After initially opposing the renaming of Hastings—Lennox and Addington—Tyendinaga from Hastings—Lennox and Addington, Kramp-Neuman reversed her earlier objection to the name of the Indigenous Tyendinaga Mohawk Territory being acknowledged in the new name.

== Electoral record ==
2025 Canadian federal election: Hastings—Lennox and Addington—Tyendinaga
Party	Candidate	Votes	%	±%
Conservative	Shelby Kramp-Neuman	36,005	54.32	+8.74
Liberal	Tracey Sweeney Schenk	26,745	40.35	+5.88
New Democratic	Ava Duffy	2,351	3.55	–7.49
Green	Michael Holbrook	803	1.21	–0.57
People's	Zaid Yusufani	377	0.57	–5.11
Total valid votes		66,281	99.46	
Total rejected ballots		363	0.54	+0.01
Turnout		66,644	71.11	+5.08
Eligible voters		93,716		
Conservative hold		Swing		+1.43
Source: Elections Canada

2021 Canadian federal election: Hastings—Lennox and Addington
Party	Candidate	Votes	%	±%	Expenditures
Conservative	Shelby Kramp-Neuman	24,651	45.1	+3.7	$105,252.11
Liberal	Mike Bossio	19,056	34.9	-2.2	$113,615.58
New Democratic	Matilda DeBues	6,020	11.0	-2.2	$6,898.68
People's	James Babcock	3,131	5.7	+3.2	$7,621.33
Green	Reg Wilson	971	1.8	-4.1	$0.00
Independent	Jennifer Sloan	838	1.5	–	$16,925.95
Total valid votes/expense limit		54,667	–	–	$117,154.76
Total rejected ballots		296			
Turnout		54,963	66.09		
Eligible voters		83,168			
Conservative hold		Swing		+3.0	
Source: Elections Canada
