= Mike Bossio =

Canadian Liberal politician

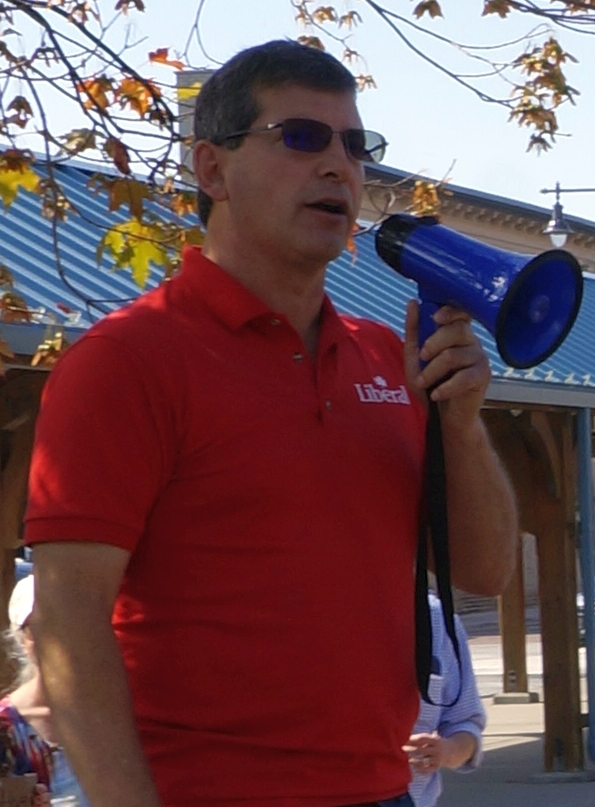

Member of Parliament for Hastings—Lennox and Addington
- In office October 19, 2015 – September 11, 2019
- Preceded by: Riding Established
- Succeeded by: Derek Sloan

Personal details
- Born: 1960 or 1961 (age 65–66) Madoc, Ontario
- Party: Liberal
- Spouse: Irene
- Education: York University

Mike Bossio (born 1960 or 1961) is a Canadian Liberal politician, who was elected to represent the riding of Hastings—Lennox and Addington in the House of Commons of Canada in the 2015 federal election and served until his defeat in the 2019 Canadian federal election.

Bossio earned a Bachelor of Arts degree in philosophy at York University. Since 1989, he has operated Boscan Consultants Inc., a consulting business that handles recruitment for telecommunications firms. From 1998 to 2000, he served as a councilor for Tyendinaga, Ontario. Other notable political involvement included leading a 15-year fight to oppose the creation of a large landfill in Tyendinaga.

In the 2015 federal election, he defeated longtime Conservative incumbent Daryl Kramp in what was considered a major surprise of the evening.

In the 42nd Canadian Parliament, Bossio sat on the Aboriginal Affairs and Northern Development committee.

== Electoral record ==
2021 Canadian federal election: Hastings—Lennox and Addington
Party	Candidate	Votes	%	±%	Expenditures
Conservative	Shelby Kramp-Neuman	24,651	45.1	+3.7	$105,252.11
Liberal	Mike Bossio	19,056	34.9	-2.2	$113,615.58
New Democratic	Matilda DeBues	6,020	11.0	-2.2	$6,898.68
People's	James Babcock	3,131	5.7	+3.2	$7,621.33
Green	Reg Wilson	971	1.8	-4.1	$0.00
Independent	Jennifer Sloan	838	1.5	–	$16,925.95
Total valid votes/expense limit		54,667	–	–	$117,154.76
Total rejected ballots		296			
Turnout		54,963	66.09		
Eligible voters		83,168			
Conservative hold		Swing		+3.0	
Source: Elections Canada

2019 Canadian federal election: Hastings—Lennox and Addington
Party	Candidate	Votes	%	±%	Expenditures
Conservative	Derek Sloan	21,968	41.4	-0.5	$34,287.91
Liberal	Mike Bossio	19,721	37.1	-5.3	$103,242.32
New Democratic	David Tough	6,984	13.2	+0.5	$4,351.46
Green	Sari Watson	3,114	5.87	+3.0	none listed
People's	Adam L. E. Gray	1,307	2.46		$1,020.01
Total valid votes/expense limit		53,094	100.0		
Total rejected ballots		352			
Turnout		53,446	66.7		
Eligible voters		80,079			
Conservative gain from Liberal		Swing		+2.40	
Source: Elections Canada

2015 Canadian federal election: Hastings—Lennox and Addington
Party	Candidate	Votes	%	±%	Expenditures
Liberal	Mike Bossio	21,104	42.4	+25.33	–
Conservative	Daryl Kramp	20,879	41.9	-12.9	–
New Democratic	Betty Bannon	6,348	12.7	-11.29	–
Green	Cam Mather	1,466	2.9	0.53+	–
Total valid votes/Expense limit		49,797	100.0		$213,176.42
Total rejected ballots		199	–	–	
Turnout		49,996	–	–	
Eligible voters		72,641			
Source: Elections Canada
