= Mark Mullins (economist) =

Canadian economist

Mark Mullins is a Canadian economist and a former executive director of the Fraser Institute.

== Background and education ==
Born in Saskatoon, Saskatchewan in 1961, he holds a Bachelor of Arts from the University of Saskatchewan, a Master of Arts from the University of Western Ontario, and a Doctor of Philosophy from the London School of Economics. His PhD thesis (1990) was titled Stock market prices: Determinants and consequences.

== Bay Street years ==
Mullins was senior vice president and chief economist at Midland Walwyn Capital Inc. He then served as President of MSG Hedge Corporation, a privately owned consulting firm.

== Political involvement ==
Mullins has been a policy advisor to the Canadian Alliance, the Progressive Conservative Party of Canada, and the Progressive Conservative Party of Ontario.

When the Ontario PC Party under Mike Harris published their "Common Sense Revolution" while campaigning in the 1995 Ontario provincial election, Mullins was quoted at the start of the document as saying: "This plan will work. The Mike Harris plan to cut provincial income tax rates by 30% and non-priority services spending by 20% will give Ontario a balanced budget within four years, and create more than 725,000 new jobs."

== Fraser Institute ==
He was the executive director of the Fraser Institute from 2005 to 2009, taking over from founder Michael Walker. Prior to assuming this position Mullins served as the director of Ontario Policy Studies at the organization.

The Fraser Institute grew under Mullins' direction, with annual fundraising of over $12 million a year.

After four years as executive director of the Fraser Institute, Mullins resigned stating that he had gone on to meet "other challenges."

== Post Fraser Institute ==
Mark Mullins is currently CEO of Veras Inc., a consulting and advisory firm specializing in finance and economics. He is a regular media commentator and is a member of the CBC television panel of economists on The National.

He is a member of Ontario's Task Force on Competitiveness, Productivity and Economic Progress and a council member with NSERC, the federal government's natural sciences and engineering research granting agency.
