= Ric Bresee =

Canadian politician

Ric Bresee MPP
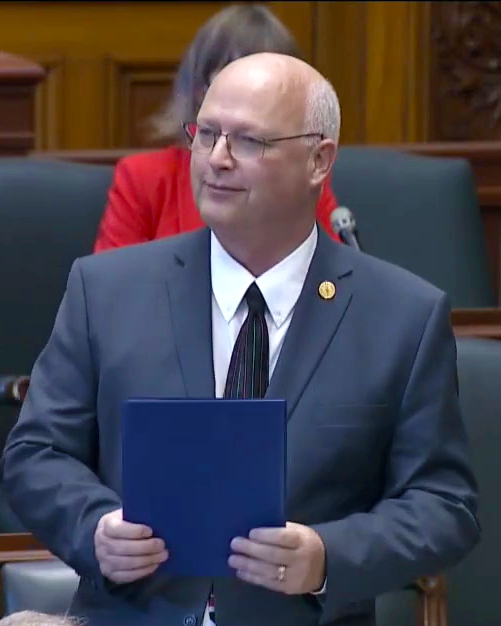
- Bresee in 2022

Member of the Ontario Provincial Parliament for Hastings—Lennox and Addington
- Incumbent
- Assumed office June 2, 2022
- Preceded by: Daryl Kramp

Personal details
- Party: Progressive Conservative

Richard Bresee MPP is a Canadian politician, who was elected to the Legislative Assembly of Ontario in the 2022 provincial election. He represents the riding of Hastings—Lennox and Addington as a member of the Progressive Conservative Party of Ontario.

Bresee was previously the mayor of Loyalist Township and the warden (in 2022) of Lennox and Addington County. Before that, he served as an instructor at St. Lawrence College and as an Associate Director of University Hospitals Kingston Foundation.

== Electoral history ==
2022 Ontario general election: Hastings—Lennox and Addington
Party	Candidate	Votes	%	±%	Expenditures
Progressive Conservative	Ric Bresee	18,156	47.55	−2.71	$66,705
New Democratic	Eric DePoe	7,258	19.01	−13.43	$45,142
Liberal	Ted Darby	7,102	18.60	+6.96	$31,699
Ontario Party	Derek Sloan	2,807	7.35		$0
Green	Christina Wilson	1,732	4.54	+0.21	$0
New Blue	Joyce Reid	1,129	2.96		$3,466
Total valid votes/expense limit		38,184	99.54	+0.56	$114,855
Total rejected, unmarked, and declined ballots		178	0.46	-0.56	
Turnout		38,362	47.12	-11.98	
Eligible voters		82,031			
Progressive Conservative hold		Swing		+5.36	
Source(s): "Summary of Valid Votes Cast for Each Candidate" (PDF). Elections Ontario. 2022. Archived from the original on 2023-05-18.; "Statistical Summary by Electoral District" (PDF). Elections Ontario. 2022. Archived from the original on 2023-05-21.
