= Hastings—Lennox and Addington—Tyendinaga =

Federal electoral district in Ontario, Canada

Coordinates: 44.6057°N 77.4602°W

Ontario electoral district
- Interactive map of riding boundaries from the 2025 federal election

Federal electoral district
- Legislature: House of Commons
MP
Shelby Kramp-Neuman
Conservative
- District created: 2013
- First contested: 2015
- Last contested: 2021
- District webpage: profile, map

Demographics
- Population (2011): 92,528
- Electors (2015): 71,818
- Area (km²): 9,217
- Pop. density (per km²): 10
- Census division(s): Hastings, Lennox and Addington
- Census subdivision(s): Belleville (part), Quinte West (part), Loyalist, Greater Napanee, Stone Mills, Tweed, Stirling-Rawdon, Centre Hastings, Tyendinaga, Hastings Highlands

Hastings—Lennox and Addington—Tyendinaga (formerly Hastings—Lennox and Addington) is a federal electoral district in Ontario.

== Demographics ==
According to the 2021 Canadian census, 2023 representation

Racial groups: 88.6% White, 7.1% Indigenous
Languages: 94.6% English, 1.9% French
Religions: 57.6% Christian (18.4% Catholic, 12.8% United Church, 7.4% Anglican, 2.3% Pentecostal, 1.6% Presbyterian, 1.1% Methodist, 1.1% Baptist, 12.9% Other), 40.7% None
Median income: $39,600 (2020)
Average income: $48,000 (2020)

== History ==
Hastings—Lennox and Addington was created by the 2012 federal electoral boundaries redistribution and was legally defined in the 2013 representation order. It came into effect upon the call of the 2015 Canadian federal election, scheduled for 19 October 2015. It was created out of parts of Prince Edward—Hastings and Lanark—Frontenac—Lennox and Addington.

Following the 2022 Canadian federal electoral redistribution, this riding was renamed Hastings—Lennox and Addington—Tyendinaga at the calling of the 2025 Canadian federal election. It gained the area of Quinte West north of the 401 and east of the Trent River (except for the Frankford area) from the electoral district of Bay of Quinte

The riding's name was proposed to be reverted to Hastings—Lennox and Addington as part of Bill C-25 of the 45th Canadian Parliament. The change was removed after the first reading.

=== Members of Parliament ===
This riding has elected the following members of Parliament:

Parliament	Years	Member	Party
Hastings—Lennox and Addington; Riding created from Lanark—Frontenac—Lennox and Addington and Prince Edward—Hastings
42nd	2015–2019	Mike Bossio	Liberal
43rd	2019–2021	Derek Sloan	Conservative
43rd	2021–2021	Derek Sloan	Independent
44th	2021–2025	Shelby Kramp-Neuman	Conservative
Hastings—Lennox and Addington—Tyendinaga
45th	2025–present	Shelby Kramp-Neuman	Conservative

== Election results ==
View source data.
Graph of election results in Hastings—Lennox and Addington (minor parties that never got 2% of the vote or didn't run consistently are omitted)

2025 Canadian federal election
Party	Candidate	Votes	%	±%
Conservative	Shelby Kramp-Neuman	36,005	54.32	+8.74
Liberal	Tracey Sweeney Schenk	26,745	40.35	+5.88
New Democratic	Ava Duffy	2,351	3.55	–7.49
Green	Michael Holbrook	803	1.21	–0.57
People's	Zaid Yusufani	377	0.57	–5.11
Total valid votes		66,281	99.46	
Total rejected ballots		363	0.54	+0.01
Turnout		66,644	71.11	+5.08
Eligible voters		93,716		
Conservative hold		Swing		+1.43
Source: Elections Canada

2021 federal election redistributed results
Party	Vote	%
Conservative	26,458	45.58
Liberal	20,008	34.47
New Democratic	6,407	11.04
People's	3,298	5.68
Green	1,035	1.78
Independent	838	1.44
Total valid votes	58,044	99.47
Rejected ballots	311	0.53
Registered voters/ estimated turnout	88,369	66.04

2021 Canadian federal election: Hastings—Lennox and Addington
Party	Candidate	Votes	%	±%	Expenditures
Conservative	Shelby Kramp-Neuman	24,651	45.1	+3.7	$105,252.11
Liberal	Mike Bossio	19,056	34.9	-2.2	$113,615.58
New Democratic	Matilda DeBues	6,020	11.0	-2.2	$6,898.68
People's	James Babcock	3,131	5.7	+3.2	$7,621.33
Green	Reg Wilson	971	1.8	-4.1	$0.00
Independent	Jennifer Sloan	838	1.5	–	$16,925.95
Total valid votes/expense limit		54,667	–	–	$117,154.76
Total rejected ballots		296			
Turnout		54,963	66.09		
Eligible voters		83,168			
Conservative hold		Swing		+3.0	
Source: Elections Canada

2019 Canadian federal election: Hastings—Lennox and Addington
Party	Candidate	Votes	%	±%	Expenditures
Conservative	Derek Sloan	21,968	41.4	-0.5	$34,287.91
Liberal	Mike Bossio	19,721	37.1	-5.3	$103,242.32
New Democratic	David Tough	6,984	13.2	+0.5	$4,351.46
Green	Sari Watson	3,114	5.87	+3.0	none listed
People's	Adam L. E. Gray	1,307	2.46		$1,020.01
Total valid votes/expense limit		53,094	100.0		
Total rejected ballots		352			
Turnout		53,446	66.7		
Eligible voters		80,079			
Conservative gain from Liberal		Swing		+2.40	
Source: Elections Canada

2015 Canadian federal election: Hastings—Lennox and Addington
Party	Candidate	Votes	%	±%	Expenditures
Liberal	Mike Bossio	21,104	42.38	+25.31	$87,494.06
Conservative	Daryl Kramp	20,879	41.93	-12.92	$112,894.94
New Democratic	Betty Bannon	6,348	12.75	-11.24	$17,112.70
Green	Cam Mather	1,466	2.94	-0.48	–
Total valid votes/Expense limit		49,797	99.60		$214,092.91
Total rejected ballots		199	0.40	–	
Turnout		49,996	68.83	–	
Eligible voters		72,641			
Liberal notional gain from Conservative		Swing		+19.12	
Source: Elections Canada

2011 federal election redistributed results
Party	Vote	%
Conservative	23,628	54.85
New Democratic	10,333	23.99
Liberal	7,353	17.07
Green	1,476	3.43
Others	285	0.66

== See also ==
- List of Canadian electoral districts
- Historical federal electoral districts of Canada
