= Richard Décarie =

Richard Décarie is a Canadian politician and business consultant from Montréal, Québec.

== Background ==
Décarie holds a bachelor’s degree in finance from Université du Québec à Montréal, and a Master's degree in philosophy from Université de Sherbrooke.

== Business and media career ==
Décarie has worked for World Vision Canada, the Quebec Food Processing Council (CTAQ), and the Associations touristiques régionales associées du Québec (ATRAQ).

In 2014, Décarie co-hosted the lunchtime talk show Duhaime le midi with Éric Duhaime on RNC Media’s Radio X Montréal 91.9FM. From September 2014 to August 2015, Décarie was the political commentator on the same station’s daily morning talk show, Lemieux in the Morning.

== Political career ==
Décarie was deputy chief of staff to Stephen Harper while he was the Leader of the Official Opposition, after he became leader of the Conservative Party of Canada. He had previously been chief of staff and senior advisor to then Premier of Quebec Daniel Johnson Jr.

=== Conservative leadership campaign ===
Décarie announced his candidacy for the 2020 Conservative Party leadership race. Public and party criticism followed his statements regarding LGBTQ2 rights after mentioning he would "defund abortion", that being gay is a "choice" and that marriage should be reserved for a "man and a woman." The Conservative Party's Leadership Candidate Nomination Committee decided not to approve Décarie's candidacy for party leadership in the month following these statements.
