= Hastings—Lennox and Addington (provincial electoral district) =

Provincial electoral district in Ontario, Canada

Coordinates: 44.6057°N 77.4602°W

Ontario electoral district
- Hastings-Lennox and Addington in relation to other electoral districts in Southern Ontario

Provincial electoral district
- Legislature: Legislative Assembly of Ontario
MPP
Ric Bresee
Progressive Conservative
- District created: 2015
- First contested: 2018
- Last contested: 2025

Demographics
- Population (2016): 94,330
- Electors (2018): 76,108
- Area (km²): 9,107
- Pop. density (per km²): 10.4
- Census division(s): Hastings, Lennox and Addington
- Census subdivision(s): Belleville (part), Centre Hastings, Greater Napanee, Hastings Highlands, Loyalist, Marmora and Lake, Stirling-Rawdon, Stone Mills, Tweed, Tyendinaga, Tyendinaga Mohawk Territory

Hastings—Lennox and Addington is a provincial electoral district in Ontario, Canada. It elects one member to the Legislative Assembly of Ontario. This riding was created in 2015.

== Members of Provincial Parliament ==
Hastings—Lennox and Addington
Assembly	Years	Member	Party
Riding created from Lanark—Frontenac—Lennox and Addington and Prince Edward—Hastings
42nd	2018–2022	Daryl Kramp	Progressive Conservative
43rd	2022–2025	Ric Bresee	Progressive Conservative
44th	2025–present	Ric Bresee	Progressive Conservative

== Election results ==
Winning party in each polling division of Hastings—Lennox and Addington at the 2025 Ontario general election

2025 Ontario general election
Party	Candidate	Votes	%	±%
Progressive Conservative	Ric Bresee	20,249	48.58	+1.03
Liberal	Lynn Rigby	12,398	29.75	+11.15
New Democratic	Jessica Zielke	4,810	11.54	-7.47
Ontario Party	Derek Sloan	2,318	5.56	-1.79
Green	Mike Holbrook	1,376	3.30	-1.24
New Blue	Glenn Tyrrell	528	1.27	-1.69
Total valid votes		41,679	99.21	-0.33
Total rejected, unmarked and declined ballots		335	0.79	+0.33
Turnout		42,014		
Eligible voters				
Progressive Conservative hold		Swing		-5.06
Source: Elections Ontario

Winning party in each polling division of Hastings—Lennox and Addington at the 2022 Ontario general election

2022 Ontario general election
Party	Candidate	Votes	%	±%	Expenditures
Progressive Conservative	Ric Bresee	18,156	47.55	−2.71	$66,705
New Democratic	Eric DePoe	7,258	19.01	−13.43	$45,142
Liberal	Ted Darby	7,102	18.60	+6.96	$31,699
Ontario Party	Derek Sloan	2,807	7.35		$0
Green	Christina Wilson	1,732	4.54	+0.21	$0
New Blue	Joyce Reid	1,129	2.96		$3,466
Total valid votes/expense limit		38,184	99.54	+0.56	$114,855
Total rejected, unmarked, and declined ballots		178	0.46	-0.56	
Turnout		38,362	47.12	-11.98	
Eligible voters		82,031			
Progressive Conservative hold		Swing		+5.36	
Source(s): "Summary of Valid Votes Cast for Each Candidate" (PDF). Elections Ontario. 2022. Archived from the original on May 18, 2023.; "Statistical Summary by Electoral District" (PDF). Elections Ontario. 2022. Archived from the original on May 21, 2023.

2018 Ontario general election: Hastings—Lennox and Addington
Party	Candidate	Votes	%	±%
Progressive Conservative	Daryl Kramp	22,374	50.25	+10.60
New Democratic	Nate Smelle	14,441	32.44	+9.50
Liberal	Tim Rigby	5,180	11.63	-19.58
Green	Sari Watson	1,924	4.32	-1.32
Trillium	Lonnie Herrington	320	0.72	
Libertarian	Greg Scholfield	282	0.63	+0.08
Total valid votes		44,521	98.98	
Total rejected, unmarked and declined ballots		461	1.02	
Turnout		44,982	59.10	
Eligible voters		76,108		
Progressive Conservative notional hold		Swing		+0.55
Source: Elections Ontario

2014 general election redistributed results
Party	Vote	%
Progressive Conservative	14,430	39.65
Liberal	11,359	31.22
New Democratic	8,346	22.94
Green	2,053	5.64
Libertarian	201	0.55

== See also ==
- List of Ontario provincial electoral districts
- Canadian provincial electoral districts
