= Daryl Kramp =

Canadian politician (1947–2024)

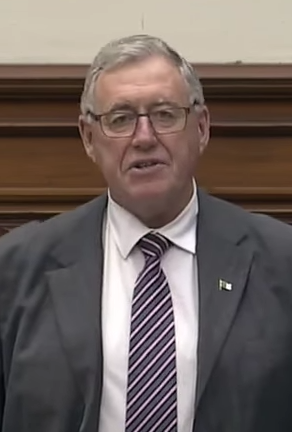
- Kramp in 2019

Member of the Ontario Provincial Parliament for Hastings—Lennox and Addington
- In office June 7, 2018 – May 3, 2022
- Preceded by: Riding Established
- Succeeded by: Ric Bresee

Member of Parliament for Prince Edward—Hastings
- In office June 28, 2004 – August 4, 2015
- Preceded by: Lyle Vanclief
- Succeeded by: Riding dissolved

Personal details
- Born: June 14, 1947 Kirkland Lake, Ontario, Canada
- Died: February 8, 2024 (aged 76)
- Party: Progressive Conservative (Provincial); Conservative (Federal)
- Spouse: Carol Ann Kramp
- Relations: Shelby Kramp-Neuman (daughter)
- Profession: International business consultant, police investigator

Daryl Kramp (June 14, 1947 – February 8, 2024) was a Canadian politician. He served as the Conservative member of the Member of Parliament for the riding of Prince Edward—Hastings. He also served as the Progressive Conservative Member of Provincial Parliament for the riding of Hastings—Lennox and Addington.

== Personal life ==
Kramp was a onetime investigator with the Ontario Provincial Police. He was a municipal councillor and deputy reeve in the municipality of Madoc, Ontario where he lived until his death. He worked in the retail, wholesale and hospitality sectors. He also organized junior-level ice hockey tours, and was a part-time instructor at St. Lawrence College, Kingston.

Kramp died on February 8, 2024, at the age of 76.

== Federal politics ==
Kramp lost two federal election bids before his victory in 2004. In the 1997 election, he ran as a Progressive Conservative in the riding of Hastings—Frontenac—Lennox and Addington, finishing second against Liberal Larry McCormick. He ran in the same riding for the 2000 election, and this time finished third against McCormick and Canadian Alliance candidate Sean McAdam.

The Canadian Alliance and Progressive Conservatives merged in 2003 as the Conservative Party of Canada. In the 2004 election, Kramp ran as a Conservative in Prince Edward—Hastings, and narrowly defeated Liberal Bruce Knutson. The seat was previously held by Liberal cabinet minister Lyle Vanclief, who was not seeking re-election. He was re-elected in 2006 by a much larger margin.

Kramp described himself as a Red Tory, although his voting record was in line with the party's direction.

Kramp was a member of the Canada-China Legislative Association (CCLA) which provides a forum for discussing bilateral and multilateral issues facing both Canada and China.

He was unseated by Mike Bossio in 2015, when he decided to run in the new riding of Hastings—Lennox and Addington which contains part of his old riding, Hastings County.

== Provincial politics ==
On October 3, 2016, Kramp announced he would be seeking the Ontario Progressive Conservative nomination in the newly created provincial riding of Hastings—Lennox and Addington. On November 26, he won the nomination.

On June 7, 2018, he was elected to the Legislative Assembly of Ontario.

In the 2021 Canadian federal election, Kramp's daughter Shelby won the Conservative nomination and federal election in Hastings—Lennox and Addington, the same riding Kramp ran in 2015.

== Electoral record ==
2018 Ontario general election: Hastings—Lennox and Addington
Party	Candidate	Votes	%	±%
Progressive Conservative	Daryl Kramp	22,374	50.25	+10.60
New Democratic	Nate Smelle	14,441	32.44	+9.50
Liberal	Tim Rigby	5,180	11.63	-19.58
Green	Sari Watson	1,924	4.32	-1.32
Trillium	Lonnie Herrington	320	0.72	
Libertarian	Greg Scholfield	282	0.63	+0.08
Total valid votes		44,521	98.98	
Total rejected, unmarked and declined ballots		461	1.02	
Turnout		44,982	59.10	
Eligible voters		76,108		
Progressive Conservative notional hold		Swing		+0.55
Source: Elections Ontario

2015 Canadian federal election: Hastings—Lennox and Addington
Party	Candidate	Votes	%	±%	Expenditures
Liberal	Mike Bossio	21,104	42.4	+25.33	–
Conservative	Daryl Kramp	20,879	41.9	-12.9	–
New Democratic	Betty Bannon	6,348	12.7	-11.29	–
Green	Cam Mather	1,466	2.9	0.53+	–
Total valid votes/expense limit		49,797	100.0		$213,176.42
Total rejected ballots		199	–	–	
Turnout		49,996	–	–	
Eligible voters		72,641			
Source: Elections Canada

2011 Canadian federal election
Party	Candidate	Votes	%	±%	Expenditures
Conservative	Daryl Kramp	29,062	53.25	+3.1	–
New Democratic	Michael McMahon	12,940	23.71	+9.9	–
Liberal	Peter Tinsley	10,230	18.75	-8.4	–
Green	Patrick Larkin	1,887	3.46	-4.9	–
Progressive Canadian	Andrew Skinner	283	0.52	–	–
Independent	Tim Hickey	171	0.31	–	–
Total valid votes/expense limit		54,573	100.00		–
Total rejected ballots		205	0.37	+0.1	
Turnout		54,778	62.14	–	
Eligible voters		88,159	–	–	

2008 Canadian federal election
Party	Candidate	Votes	%	±%	Expenditures
Conservative	Daryl Kramp	26,061	50.2	+1.5	$85,625
Liberal	Ken Cole	14,048	27.1	-4.5	$71,249
New Democratic	Michael McMahon	7,156	13.8	-1.0	$14,473
Green	Alan Coxwell	4,379	8.4	+4.2	$12,930
Independent	Paul Barnes	276	0.5	–	$0
Total valid votes/expense limit		51,920	100.0		$90,734
Total rejected ballots		172	0.3	–	
Turnout		52,092	–	–	

2006 Canadian federal election
Party	Candidate	Votes	%	±%
Conservative	Daryl Kramp	27,787	48.7	+6.3
Liberal	Bob Vaughan	18,034	31.6	-6.0
New Democratic	Michael McMahon	8,474	14.8	-0.4
Green	Joseph Sahadat	2,386	4.2	+0.2
Independent	Tim Hickey	416	0.7	–
Total valid votes		57,097	100.0	

2004 Canadian federal election
Party	Candidate	Votes	%	±%
Conservative	Daryl Kramp	22,598	42.4	-0.3
Liberal	Bruce Knutson	20,042	37.6	-14.0
New Democratic	Dan Douglas	8,105	15.2	+9.4
Green	Tom Lawson	2,130	4.0	
Independent	Joseph Sahadat	468	0.9	
Total valid votes		53,343	100.0	

2000 Canadian federal election: Hastings—Frontenac—Lennox and Addington
Party	Candidate	Votes
Liberal	Larry McCormick	16,996
Alliance	Sean McAdam	13,227
Progressive Conservative	Daryl Kramp	10,231
New Democratic	Tom O'Neill	2,200
Green	Chris Walker	516
Independent	Ross Baker	207
Canadian Action	Paul Isaacs	156
No affiliation	Kenneth Switzer	43

1997 Canadian federal election: Hastings—Frontenac—Lennox and Addington
Party	Candidate	Votes
Liberal	Larry McCormick	18,399
Progressive Conservative	Daryl Kramp	12,227
Reform	Sean McAdam	12,045
New Democratic	Robert Snefjella	3,255
Christian Heritage	Kenneth L. Switzer	505
Natural Law	Lester Newby	189
