= Minister of the Economic Development Agency of Canada for the Regions of Quebec =

Canadian cabinet position (2004–2015)

- Incumbent; Vacant since November 4, 2015
- Economic Development Agency for the Regions of Quebec
- Style: The Honourable
- Member of: Cabinet; Privy Council
- Appointer: Monarch (represented by the governor general) on the advice of the prime minister
- Term length: At His Majesty's pleasure
- Inaugural holder: Jacques Saada
- Formation: July 20, 2004

The Minister of the Economic Development Agency of Canada for the Regions of Quebec (French: Ministre de l'Agence de développement économique du Canada pour les régions du Québec) is the member of the Cabinet of Canada who also serves as the chief executive of the Economic Development Agency of Canada for the Regions of Quebec.

Prior to 2004, the portfolio was considered an add-on responsibility for a full Cabinet minister with other responsibilities, usually the Industry Minister. It was consequently termed the Minister responsible for the Economic Development Agency of Canada for the Regions of Quebec.

Related regional development posts included Minister for the Atlantic Canada Opportunities Agency, Minister of the Federal Economic Development Initiative for Northern Ontario and Minister of Western Economic Diversification.

The post was vacant since 2015, with the last minister to hold this post being Denis Lebel. The post was abolished in 2021, with the Minister responsible for the Economic Development Agency of Canada for the Regions of Quebec portfolio being revived to take its place.

== Ministers ==
Key:

Liberal Party of Canada
Conservative Party of Canada

No.	Name	Term of office		Political party	Ministry
1	Jacques Saada	July 20, 2004	February 5, 2006	Liberal	27 (Martin)
2	Jean-Pierre Blackburn	February 6, 2006	October 29, 2008	Conservative	28 (Harper)
3	Denis Lebel	October 30, 2008	November 4, 2015	Conservative	28 (Harper)

Prior to 2004 and since 2021, responsibilities for this portfolio were handled by cabinet minister with another primary office, termed the Minister responsible for the Economic Development Agency of Canada for the Regions of Quebec (list).
