= Minister responsible for the Federal Economic Development Agency for Northern Ontario =

Canadian cabinet position

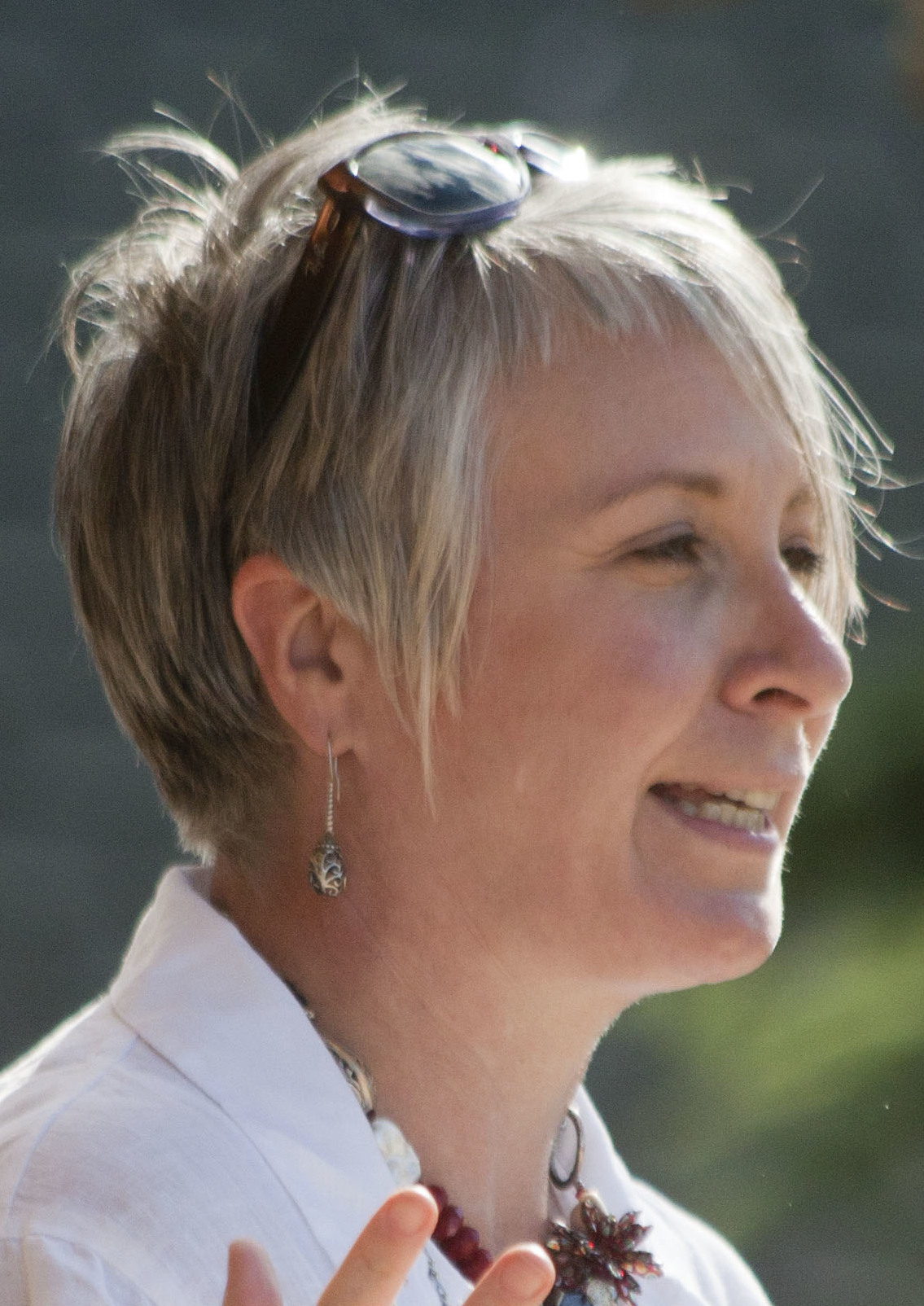
- Incumbent; Patty Hajdu since May 13, 2025
- Innovation, Science and Economic Development Canada
- Style: The Honourable
- Term length: At His Majesty's pleasure
- Precursor: Minister of State responsible for the Federal Economic Development Initiative for Northern Ontario
- Formation: August 3, 1999
- First holder: Andy Mitchell (styled Secretary of State)

The minister responsible for the Federal Economic Development Agency for Northern Ontario (French: ministre responsable de l’Agence fédérale de développement économique pour le Nord de l’Ontario) is the minister in the Canadian Cabinet who also serves as the chief executive of Federal Economic Development Agency for Northern Ontario (FedNor), an agency of Innovation, Science and Economic Development Canada.

== Ministers ==
No.	Portrait	Name	Term of office		Political party	Ministry
Secretary of State (Federal Economic Development Initiative for Northern Ontario)
1		Andy Mitchell (1st time)	August 3, 1999	December 11, 2003	Liberal	26 (Chrétien)
Minister of State (Federal Economic Development Initiative for Northern Ontario)
2		Joe Comuzzi	December 12, 2003	June 27, 2005	Liberal	27 (Martin)
(1)		Andy Mitchell (2nd time)	June 28, 2005	February 5, 2006	Liberal	27 (Martin)
Minister for the Federal Economic Development Initiative for Northern Ontario
3		Tony Clement (1st time)	February 6, 2006	October 30, 2008	Conservative	28 (Harper)
Position discontinued; responsibilities given to the Minister of Industry
(3)		Tony Clement (2nd time)	May 18, 2011	July 14, 2013	Conservative	28 (Harper)
4		Greg Rickford	July 15, 2013	August 1, 2015	Conservative	28 (Harper)
Position discontinued; responsibilities given to the Minister of Innovation, Science and Economic Development (2015 to 2019) and Minister of Economic Development and Official Languages (2019 to 2021)
Minister responsible for the Federal Economic Development Agency for Northern Ontario
5		Patty Hajdu (1st time)	October 26, 2021	March 14, 2025	Liberal	29 (J. Trudeau)
Position discontinued; responsibilities given to the Minister of Innovation, Science and Industry
(5)		Patty Hajdu (2nd time)	May 13, 2025	Incumbent	Liberal	30 (Carney)
