= 26th Canadian Ministry =

Government cabinet of Canada (1993–2003)

26th Canadian Ministry 26e conseil des ministres du Canada
- 26th ministry of Canada

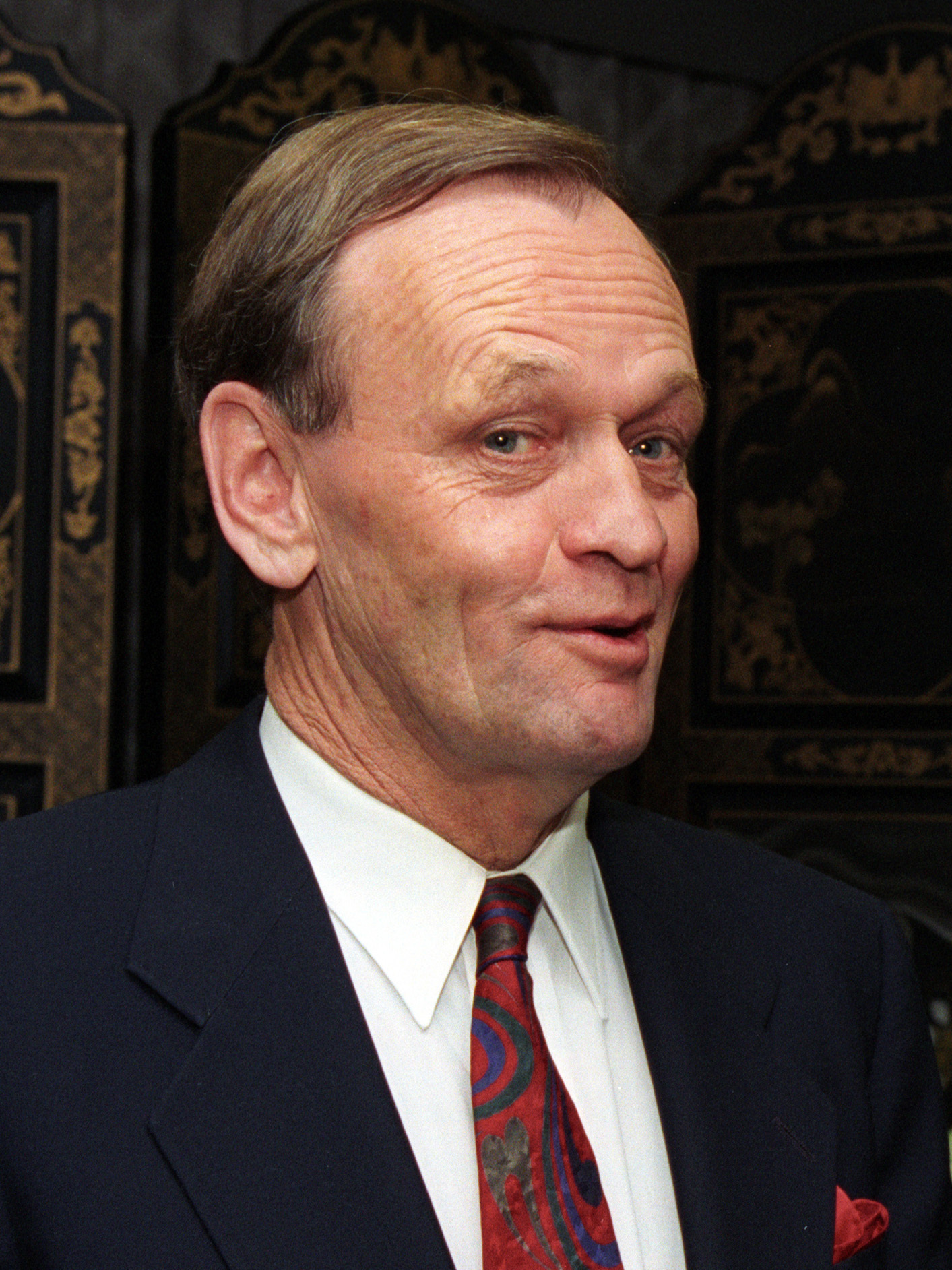
- Date formed: 4 November 1993
- Date dissolved: 12 December 2003

People and organizations
- Monarch: Elizabeth II
- Governor General: Ray Hnatyshyn (1993–1995); Romeo Leblanc (1995–1999); Adrienne Clarkson (1999–2003)
- Prime Minister: Jean Chrétien
- Prime Minister's history: Premiership of Jean Chrétien
- Deputy Prime Minister: Sheila Copps (1993–1997); Herb Gray (1997–2002); John Manley (2002–2003)
- Member party: Liberal
- Status in legislature: Majority
- Opposition party: Bloc Quebecois (1993–1997); Reform (1997–2000); Alliance (2000–2003)
- Opposition leader: Lucien Bouchard (1993–1996); Gilles Duceppe (1996, 1997); Michel Gauthier (1996–1997); Preston Manning (1997–2000); Deborah Grey (2000); Stockwell Day (2000–2001); John Reynolds (2001–2002); Stephen Harper (2002–2003)

History
- Incoming formation: 1993 federal election
- Outgoing formation: 2003 Liberal leadership election
- Elections: 1993, 1997, 2000
- Legislature terms: 35th Canadian Parliament; 36th Canadian Parliament; 37th Canadian Parliament
- Budgets: 1994, 1995, 1996, 1997, 1998, 1999, 2000, 2001, 2003
- Predecessor: 25th Canadian Ministry
- Successor: 27th Canadian Ministry

The Twenty-Sixth Canadian Ministry was the combined cabinet, chaired by Prime Minister Jean Chrétien, and the contemporary secretaries of state. It governed Canada from 4 November 1993 to 12 December 2003, including the 35th Canadian Parliament, the 36th, and most of the 37th. The government was formed by the Liberal Party of Canada. One particular fact of this ministry is the creation of Secretaries of State out of the Cabinet, but still in the ministry.

== List of ministers ==
=== By minister ===
Note: This is in order of precedence, which is established by the chronological order of appointment to the Queen's Privy Council for Canada.

Portrait	Minister	Riding	Portfolio	Tenure
	Jean Chrétien	Saint-Maurice	Prime Minister	4 November 1993 – 12 December 2003
	Herb Gray	Windsor West	Leader of the Government in the House of Commons	4 November 1993 – 10 June 1997
	Herb Gray	Windsor West	Solicitor General	4 November 1993 – 10 June 1997
	Herb Gray	Windsor West	Deputy Prime Minister	11 June 1997 – 14 January 2002
	André Ouellet	Papineau	Secretary of State for External Affairs	4 November 1993 – 13 May 1995
	André Ouellet	Papineau	Minister of Foreign Affairs	13 May 1995 – 24 January 1996
	Lloyd Axworthy	Winnipeg South Centre	Minister of Labour	4 November 1993 – 21 February 1995
	Lloyd Axworthy	Winnipeg South Centre	Minister of Employment and Immigration	4 November 1993 – 24 January 1996
	Lloyd Axworthy	Winnipeg South Centre	Minister of Western Economic Diversification	4 November 1993 – 24 January 1996
	Lloyd Axworthy	Winnipeg South Centre	Minister of Foreign Affairs	25 January 1996 – 16 October 2000
	David Collenette	Don Valley East	Minister of National Defence	4 November 1993 – 4 October 1996
	David Collenette	Don Valley East	Minister of Veterans Affairs	4 November 1993 – 4 October 1996
	David Collenette	Don Valley East	Minister of Transport	11 June 1997 – 12 December 2003
	Roy MacLaren	Etobicoke North	Minister for International Trade	4 November 1993 – 24 January 1996
	David Anderson	Victoria	Minister of National Revenue	4 November 1993 – 24 January 1996
	David Anderson	Victoria	Minister of Transport	25 January 1996 – 10 June 1997
	David Anderson	Victoria	Minister of Fisheries and Oceans	11 June 1997 – 2 August 1999
	David Anderson	Victoria	Minister of the Environment	3 August 1999 – 12 December 2003
	Ralph Goodale	Regina–Wascana	Minister of Agriculture	4 November 1993 – 11 January 1995
	Ralph Goodale	Regina–Wascana	Minister of Agriculture and Agri-Food	12 January 1995 – 10 June 1997
	Ralph Goodale	Regina–Wascana	Minister of Natural Resources	11 June 1997 – 14 January 2002
	Ralph Goodale	Regina–Wascana	Leader of the Government in the House of Commons	15 January – 25 May 2002
	Ralph Goodale	Regina–Wascana	Minister of Public Works and Government Services	26 May 2002 – 12 December 2003
	David Dingwall	Cape Breton–East Richmond	Minister of Public Works	4 November 1993 – 24 January 1996
	David Dingwall	Cape Breton–East Richmond	Minister of Supply and Services	4 November 1993 – 24 January 1996
	David Dingwall	Cape Breton–East Richmond	Minister for the Atlantic Canada Opportunities Agency	4 November 1993 – 24 January 1996
	David Dingwall	Cape Breton–East Richmond	Minister of National Health and Welfare	25 January – 11 June 1996
	David Dingwall	Cape Breton–East Richmond	Minister of Health	12 July 1996 – 10 June 1997
	Ron Irwin	Sault Ste. Marie	Minister of Indian Affairs and Northern Development	4 November 1993 – 10 June 1997
	Brian Tobin	Humber–St. Barbe–Baie Verte	Minister of Fisheries and Oceans	4 November 1993 – 8 January 1996
	Brian Tobin	Bonavista–Trinity–Conception	Minister of Industry	17 October 2000 – 14 January 2002
	Brian Tobin	Bonavista–Trinity–Conception	Minister of Western Economic Diversification	17 October 2000 – 14 January 2002
	Brian Tobin	Bonavista–Trinity–Conception	Minister for the Atlantic Canada Opportunities Agency	17 October 2000 – 14 January 2002
	Joyce Fairbairn	Lethbridge (Senator)	Leader of the Government in the Senate	4 November 1993 – 10 June 1997
	Joyce Fairbairn	Lethbridge (Senator)	Minister with Special Responsibility for Literacy	4 November 1993 – 10 June 1997
	Sheila Copps	Hamilton East	Deputy Prime Minister	4 November 1993 – 30 April 1996
	Sheila Copps	Hamilton East	Minister of the Environment	4 November 1993 – 24 January 1996
	Sheila Copps	Hamilton East	Minister of Communications	25 January – 30 April 1996
	Sheila Copps	Hamilton East	Minister of Multiculturalism and Citizenship	25 January – 30 April 1996
	Sheila Copps	Hamilton East	Minister of Communications	19 June – 11 July 1996
	Sheila Copps	Hamilton East	Minister of Multiculturalism and Citizenship	19 June – 11 July 1996
	Sheila Copps	Hamilton East	Deputy Prime Minister	19 June 1996 – 10 June 1997
	Sheila Copps	Hamilton East	Minister of Canadian Heritage	12 July 1996 – 12 December 2003
	Sergio Marchi	York West	Secretary of State for Canada	4 November 1993 – 24 January 1996
	Sergio Marchi	York West	Minister of Citizenship and Immigration	30 June 1994 – 24 January 1996
	Sergio Marchi	York West	Minister of the Environment	25 January 1996 – 10 June 1997
	Sergio Marchi	York West	Minister for International Trade	11 June 1997 – 2 August 1999
	John Manley	Ottawa South	Minister of Consumer and Corporate Affairs	4 November 1993 – 28 March 1995
	John Manley	Ottawa South	Minister of Industry, Science and Technology	4 November 1993 – 28 March 1995
	John Manley	Ottawa South	Minister of Industry	29 March 1995 – 16 October 2000
	John Manley	Ottawa South	Minister of Western Economic Diversification	25 January 1996 – 16 October 2000
	John Manley	Ottawa South	Minister for the Atlantic Canada Opportunities Agency	25 January 1996 – 16 October 2000
	John Manley	Ottawa South	Minister responsible for the Federal Office of Regional Development - Quebec	25 January 1996 – 10 June 1997
	John Manley	Ottawa South	Minister of Foreign Affairs	17 October 2000 – 15 January 2002
	John Manley	Ottawa South	Deputy Prime Minister	15 January 2002 – 12 December 2003
	John Manley	Ottawa South	Minister of Finance	2 June 2002 – 12 December 2003
	Diane Marleau	Sudbury	Minister of National Health and Welfare	4 November 1993 – 24 January 1996
	Diane Marleau	Sudbury	Minister of Public Works	25 January – 11 July 1996
	Diane Marleau	Sudbury	Minister of Supply and Services	25 January – 11 July 1996
	Diane Marleau	Sudbury	Minister of Public Works and Government Services	12 July 1996 – 10 June 1997
	Diane Marleau	Sudbury	Minister for International Cooperation	11 June 1997 – 2 August 1999
	Paul Martin	LaSalle–Émard	Minister responsible for the Federal Office of Regional Development - Quebec	4 November 1993 – 24 January 1996
	Paul Martin	LaSalle–Émard	Minister of Finance	4 November 1993 – 2 June 2002
	Doug Young	Acadie–Bathurst	Minister of Transport	4 November 1993 – 24 January 1996
	Doug Young	Acadie–Bathurst	Minister of Employment and Immigration	25 January – 11 July 1996
	Doug Young	Acadie–Bathurst	Minister of Human Resources Development	12 July – 3 October 1996
	Doug Young	Acadie–Bathurst	Minister of National Defence	4 October 1996 – 10 June 1997
	Doug Young	Acadie–Bathurst	Minister of Veterans Affairs	4 October 1996 – 10 June 1997
	Michel Dupuy	Laval West	Minister of Communications	4 November 1993 – 24 January 1996
	Michel Dupuy	Laval West	Minister of Multiculturalism and Citizenship	4 November 1993 – 24 January 1996
	Art Eggleton	York Centre	President of the Treasury Board	4 November 1993 – 24 January 1996
	Art Eggleton	York Centre	Minister responsible for Infrastructure	4 November 1993 – 24 January 1996
	Art Eggleton	York Centre	Minister for International Trade	25 January 1996 – 10 June 1997
	Art Eggleton	York Centre	Minister of National Defence	11 June 1997 – 26 May 2002
	Marcel Massé	Hull–Aylmer	President of the Queen's Privy Council for Canada	4 November 1993 – 24 January 1996
	Marcel Massé	Hull–Aylmer	Minister of Intergovernmental Affairs	4 November 1993 – 24 January 1996
	Marcel Massé	Hull–Aylmer	Minister responsible for Public Service Renewal	4 November 1993 – 24 January 1996
	Marcel Massé	Hull–Aylmer	President of the Treasury Board	25 January 1996 – 2 August 1999
	Marcel Massé	Hull–Aylmer	Minister responsible for Infrastructure	25 January 1996 – 2 August 1999
	Anne McLellan	Edmonton Northwest	Minister of Energy, Mines and Resources	4 November 1993 – 11 January 1995
	Anne McLellan	Edmonton Northwest	Minister of Forestry	4 November 1993 – 11 January 1995
	Anne McLellan	Edmonton Northwest	Minister of Natural Resources	12 January 1995 – 10 June 1997
	Anne McLellan	Edmonton West	Minister of Justice	11 June 1997 – 14 January 2002
	Anne McLellan	Edmonton West	Attorney General	11 June 1997 – 14 January 2002
	Anne McLellan	Edmonton West	Minister of Health	15 January 2002 – 12 December 2003
	Allan Rock	Etobicoke Centre	Minister of Justice	4 November 1993 – 10 June 1997
	Allan Rock	Etobicoke Centre	Attorney General	4 November 1993 – 10 June 1997
	Allan Rock	Etobicoke Centre	Minister of Health	11 June 1997 – 14 January 2002
	Allan Rock	Etobicoke Centre	Minister of Industry	15 January 2002 – 12 December 2003
	Allan Rock	Etobicoke Centre	Minister of Western Economic Diversification	15 January 2002 – 12 December 2003
	Allan Rock	Etobicoke Centre	Minister for the Atlantic Canada Opportunities Agency	15 January 2002 – 12 December 2003
	Sheila Finestone	Mount Royal	Secretary of State for Multiculturalism	4 November 1993 – 24 January 1996
	Sheila Finestone	Mount Royal	Secretary of State for Status of Women	4 November 1993 – 24 January 1996
	Fernand Robichaud	Beauséjour	Secretary of State for Parliamentary Affairs	4 November 1993 – 14 September 1994
	Fernand Robichaud	Beauséjour	Secretary of State for Agriculture and Agri-Food, Fisheries and Oceans	15 September 1994 – 10 June 1997
	Ethel Blondin-Andrew	Western Arctic	Secretary of State for Training and Youth	4 November 1993 – 10 June 1997
	Ethel Blondin-Andrew	Western Arctic	Secretary of State for Children and Youth	10 June 1997 – 12 December 2003
	Lawrence MacAulay	Cardigan	Secretary of State for Veterans Affairs	4 November 1993 – 10 June 1997
	Lawrence MacAulay	Cardigan	Secretary of State for the Atlantic Canada Opportunities Agency	25 January 1996 – 10 June 1997
	Lawrence MacAulay	Cardigan	Minister of Labour	11 June 1997 – 22 November 1998
	Lawrence MacAulay	Cardigan	Solicitor General	23 November 1998 – 22 October 2002
	Christine Stewart	Northumberland	Secretary of State for Foreign Affairs (Latin America and Africa)	4 November 1993 – 10 June 1997
	Christine Stewart	Northumberland	Minister of the Environment	11 June 1997 – 2 August 1999
	Raymond Chan	Richmond	Secretary of State for Foreign Affairs (Asia-Pacific)	4 November 1993 – 8 January 2001
	Jon Gerrard	Portage–Interlake	Secretary of State for Science, Research and Development	4 November 1993 – 10 June 1997
	Jon Gerrard	Portage–Interlake	Secretary of State for Western Economic Diversification	25 January 1996 – 10 June 1997
	Douglas Peters	Scarborough East	Secretary of State for International Financial Institutions	4 November 1993 – 10 June 1997
	Alfonso Gagliano	Saint-Léonard–Saint-Michel	Secretary of State for Parliamentary Affairs	15 September 1994 – 24 January 1996
	Alfonso Gagliano	Saint-Léonard–Saint-Michel	Deputy Leader of the Government in the House of Commons	15 September 1994 – 14 January 2002
	Alfonso Gagliano	Saint-Léonard–Saint-Michel	Minister of Labour	25 January 1996 – 10 June 1997
	Alfonso Gagliano	Saint-Léonard–Saint-Michel	Minister of Public Works and Government Services	11 June 1997 – 14 January 2002
	Lucienne Robillard	Saint-Henri–Westmount	Minister of Labour	22 February 1995 – 24 January 1996
	Lucienne Robillard	Saint-Henri–Westmount	Secretary of State for Canada	25 January – 12 July 1996
	Lucienne Robillard	Saint-Henri–Westmount	Minister of Citizenship and Immigration	25 January 1996 – 2 August 1999
	Lucienne Robillard	Westmount–Ville-Marie	President of the Treasury Board	3 August 1999 – 12 December 2003
	Fred Mifflin	Bonavista–Trinity–Conception	Minister of Fisheries and Oceans	25 January 1996 – 10 June 1997
	Fred Mifflin	Bonavista–Trinity–Conception	Minister of Veterans Affairs	11 June 1997 – 2 August 1999
	Fred Mifflin	Bonavista–Trinity–Conception	Secretary of State for the Atlantic Canada Opportunities Agency	11 June 1997 – 2 August 1999
	Jane Stewart	Brant	Minister of National Revenue	25 January 1996 – 10 June 1997
	Jane Stewart	Brant	Minister of Indian Affairs and Northern Development	11 June 1997 – 2 August 1999
	Jane Stewart	Brant	Minister of Human Resources Development	3 August 1999 – 12 December 2003
	Stéphane Dion	Saint-Laurent–Cartierville	President of the Queen's Privy Council for Canada	25 January 1996 – 12 December 2003
	Stéphane Dion	Saint-Laurent–Cartierville	Minister of Intergovernmental Affairs	25 January 1996 – 12 December 2003
	Pierre Pettigrew	Papineau–Saint-Michel	Minister for International Cooperation	25 January – 3 October 1996
	Pierre Pettigrew	Papineau–Saint-Michel	Minister responsible for La Francophonie	25 January – 3 October 1996
	Pierre Pettigrew	Papineau–Saint-Michel	Minister of Human Resources Development	4 October 1996 – 2 August 1999
	Pierre Pettigrew	Papineau–Saint-Denis	Minister for International Trade	3 August 1999 – 12 December 2003
	Martin Cauchon	Outremont	Secretary of State for the Federal Office of Regional Development - Quebec	25 January 1996 – 22 February 1998
	Martin Cauchon	Outremont	Secretary of State for Economic Development Agency of Canada for the Regions of Quebec	23 February 1998 – 14 January 2002
	Martin Cauchon	Outremont	Minister of National Revenue	3 August 1999 – 14 January 2002
	Martin Cauchon	Outremont	Minister of Justice	15 January 2002 – 12 December 2003
	Martin Cauchon	Outremont	Attorney General	15 January 2002 – 12 December 2003
	Martin Cauchon	Outremont	Minister with political responsibility for Quebec	15 January 2002 – 12 December 2003
	Hedy Fry	Vancouver Centre	Secretary of State for Multiculturalism	25 January 1996 – 27 January 2002
	Hedy Fry	Vancouver Centre	Secretary of State for Status of Women	25 January 1996 – 27 January 2002
	Don Boudria	Glengarry–Prescott–Russell	Minister for International Cooperation	4 October 1996 – 10 June 1997
	Don Boudria	Glengarry–Prescott–Russell	Minister responsible for La Francophonie	4 October 1996 – 10 June 1997
	Don Boudria	Glengarry–Prescott–Russell	Leader of the Government in the House of Commons	11 June 1997 – 14 January 2002
	Don Boudria	Glengarry–Prescott–Russell	Minister of Public Works and Government Services	15 January – 25 May 2002
	Don Boudria	Glengarry–Prescott–Russell	Leader of the Government in the House of Commons	26 May 2002 – 12 December 2003
	Alasdair Graham	The Highlands (Senator)	Leader of the Government in the Senate	June 11, 1997 – January 14, 2002
	Lyle Vanclief	Prince Edward–Hastings	Minister of Agriculture and Agri-Food	11 June 1997 – 12 December 2003
	Herb Dhaliwal	Vancouver South–Burnaby	Minister of National Revenue	11 June 1997 – 2 August 1999
	Herb Dhaliwal	Vancouver South–Burnaby	Minister of Fisheries and Oceans	3 August 1999 – 14 January 2002
	Herb Dhaliwal	Vancouver South–Burnaby	Minister of Natural Resources	15 January 2002 – 12 December 2003
	Andy Scott	Fredericton	Solicitor General	11 June 1997 – 23 November 1998
	David Kilgour	Edmonton Southeast	Secretary of State for Foreign Affairs (Latin America and Africa)	11 June 1997 – 14 January 2002
	David Kilgour	Edmonton Southeast	Secretary of State for Foreign Affairs (Asia-Pacific)	15 January 2002 – 12 December 2003
	Jim Peterson	Willowdale	Secretary of State for International Financial Institutions	11 June 1997 – 14 January 2002
	Ron Duhamel	Saint Boniface	Secretary of State for Science, Research and Development	11 June 1997 – 2 August 1999
	Ron Duhamel	Saint Boniface	Secretary of State for Western Economic Diversification	11 June 1997 – 14 January 2002
	Ron Duhamel	Saint Boniface	Secretary of State for La Francophonie	3 August 1999 – 14 January 2002
	Ron Duhamel	Saint Boniface	Minister of Veterans Affairs	17 October 2000 – 14 January 2002
	Andy Mitchell	Parry Sound–Muskoka	Secretary of State for Parks	11 June 1997 – 2 August 1999
	Andy Mitchell	Parry Sound–Muskoka	Secretary of State for Rural Development	3 August 1999 – 12 December 2003
	Andy Mitchell	Parry Sound–Muskoka	Secretary of State for Federal Economic Development Initiative for Northern Ontario	3 August 1999 – 12 December 2003
	Gilbert Normand	Bellechasse–Etchemins–Montmagny–L'Islet	Secretary of State for Agriculture and Agri-Food	18 June 1997 – 2 August 1999
	Gilbert Normand	Bellechasse–Etchemins–Montmagny–L'Islet	Secretary of State for Fisheries and Oceans	18 June 1997 – 2 August 1999
	Gilbert Normand	Bellechasse–Etchemins–Montmagny–L'Islet	Secretary of State for Science, Research and Development	3 August 1999 – 14 January 2002
	Claudette Bradshaw	Moncton–Riverview–Dieppe	Minister of Labour	23 November 1998 – 12 December 2003
	Claudette Bradshaw	Moncton–Riverview–Dieppe	Secretary of State for Multiculturalism	28 January – 25 May 2002
	Claudette Bradshaw	Moncton–Riverview–Dieppe	Secretary of State for Status of Women	28 January – 25 May 2002
	George Baker	Gander–Grand Falls	Minister of Veterans Affairs	3 August 1999 – 16 October 2000
	George Baker	Gander–Grand Falls	Secretary of State for the Atlantic Canada Opportunities Agency	3 August 1999 – 16 October 2000
	Bob Nault	Kenora–Rainy River	Minister of Indian Affairs and Northern Development	3 August 1999 – 12 December 2003
	Maria Minna	Beaches–East York	Minister for International Cooperation	3 August 1999 – 14 January 2002
	Elinor Caplan	Thornhill	Minister of Citizenship and Immigration	3 August 1999 – 14 January 2002
	Elinor Caplan	Thornhill	Minister of National Revenue	15 January 2002 – 12 December 2003
	Denis Coderre	Bourassa	Secretary of State for Amateur Sport	3 August 1999 – 14 January 2002
	Denis Coderre	Bourassa	Minister of Citizenship and Immigration	15 January 2002 – 12 December 2003
	Bernie Boudreau	Nova Scotia (Senator)	Leader of the Government in the Senate	4 October 1999 – 8 January 2001
	Bernie Boudreau	Nova Scotia (Senator)	Minister of State for the Atlantic Canada Opportunities Agency	4 October 1999 – 8 January 2001
	Sharon Carstairs	Manitoba (Senator)	Leader of the Government in the Senate	9 January 2001 – 12 December 2003
	Sharon Carstairs	Manitoba (Senator)	Minister with Special Responsibility for Palliative Care	14 March 2001 – 12 December 2003
	Robert Thibault	West Nova	Minister of State for the Atlantic Canada Opportunities Agency	9 January 2001 – 14 January 2002
	Robert Thibault	West Nova	Minister of Fisheries and Oceans	15 January 2002 – 12 December 2003
	Rey Pagtakhan	Winnipeg North–St. Paul	Secretary of State for Foreign Affairs (Asia-Pacific)	9 January 2001 – 14 January 2002
	Rey Pagtakhan	Winnipeg North–St. Paul	Minister of Veterans Affairs	15 January 2002 – 12 December 2003
	Rey Pagtakhan	Winnipeg North–St. Paul	Secretary of State for Science, Research and Development	26 May 2002 – 12 December 2003
	Susan Whelan	Essex	Minister for International Cooperation	15 January 2002 – 12 December 2003
	Maurizio Bevilacqua	Vaughan–King–Aurora	Secretary of State for Science, Research and Development	15 January – 25 May 2002
	Maurizio Bevilacqua	Vaughan–King–Aurora	Secretary of State for International Financial Institutions	26 May 2002 – 12 December 2003
	Paul DeVillers	Simcoe North	Secretary of State for Amateur Sport	15 January 2002 – 12 December 2003
	Paul DeVillers	Simcoe North	Deputy Leader of the Government in the House of Commons	15 January 2002 – 12 December 2003
	Paul DeVillers	Simcoe North	Secretary of State for Physical Activity and Sport	17 June – 12 December 2003
	Gar Knutson	Elgin–Middlesex–London	Secretary of State for Foreign Affairs (Central and Eastern Europe and Middle East)	15 January 2002 – 12 December 2003
	Denis Paradis	Brome–Missisquoi	Secretary of State for La Francophonie	15 January 2002 – 12 December 2003
	Denis Paradis	Brome–Missisquoi	Secretary of State for Foreign Affairs (Latin America and Africa)	15 January 2002 – 12 December 2003
	Claude Drouin	Beauce	Secretary of State for Economic Development Agency of Canada for the Regions of Quebec	15 January 2002 – 12 December 2003
	John McCallum	Markham	Secretary of State for International Financial Institutions	15 January – 25 May 2002
	John McCallum	Markham	Minister of National Defence	26 May 2002 – 12 December 2003
	Stephen Owen	Vancouver Quadra	Secretary of State for Indian Affairs and Northern Development	15 January 2002 – 12 December 2003
	Stephen Owen	Vancouver Quadra	Secretary of State for Western Economic Diversification	15 January 2002 – 12 December 2003
	Bill Graham	Toronto Centre–Rosedale	Minister of Foreign Affairs	15 January 2002 – 12 December 2003
	Gerry Byrne	Humber–St. Barbe–Baie Verte	Minister of State for the Atlantic Canada Opportunities Agency	15 January 2002 – 12 December 2003
	Jean Augustine	Etobicoke–Lakeshore	Secretary of State for Multiculturalism	26 May 2002 – 12 December 2003
	Jean Augustine	Etobicoke–Lakeshore	Secretary of State for Status of Women	26 May 2002 – 12 December 2003
	Wayne Easter	Malpeque	Solicitor General	22 October 2002 – 12 December 2003
	Steve Mahoney	Mississauga West	Secretary of State for Selected Crown Corporations	11 April – 12 December 2003

=== By portfolio ===
- Prime Minister
  - 4 November 1993 – 12 December 2003: Jean Chrétien
- Deputy Prime Minister of Canada
  - 4 November 1993 – 30 April 1996: Sheila Copps
  - 1 May 1996 – 18 June 1996: Vacant
  - 19 June 1996 – 10 June 1997: Sheila Copps
  - 11 June 1997 – 14 January 2002: Herb Gray
  - 15 January 2002 – 12 December 2003: John Manley
- Minister of Agriculture
  - 4 November 1993 – 11 January 1995: Ralph Goodale
  - Became Minister of Agriculture and Agri-Food.
- Minister of Agriculture and Agri-Food
  - Was Minister of Agriculture.
  - 12 January 1995 – 10 June 1997: Ralph Goodale
  - 11 June 1997 – 12 December 2003: Lyle Vanclief
- Minister for the Atlantic Canada Opportunities Agency
  - 4 November 1993 – 24 January 1996: David Charles Dingwall
  - 25 January 1996 – 16 October 2000: John Manley
  - 17 October 2000 – 14 January 2002: Brian Tobin
  - 15 January 2002 – 12 December 2003: Allan Rock
- Minister of Canadian Heritage
  - Was Minister of Communications and Minister of Multiculturalism and Citizenship.
  - 12 July 1996 – 12 December 2003: Sheila Copps
- Minister of Citizenship and Immigration
  - 30 June 1994 – 24 January 1996: Sergio Marchi
  - 25 January 1996 – 2 August 1999: Lucienne Robillard
  - 3 August 1999 – 14 January 2002: Elinor Caplan
  - 15 January 2002 – 12 December 2003: Denis Coderre
- Minister of Communications
  - 4 November 1993 – 24 January 1996: Michel Dupuy
  - 25 January 1996 – 30 April 1996: Sheila Copps
  - 1 May 1996 – 18 June 1996: Vacant
  - 19 June 1996 – 11 July 1996: Sheila Copps
  - Became Minister of Canadian Heritage
- Minister of Consumer and Corporate Affairs
  - 4 November 1993 – 28 March 1995: John Manley
  - Became Minister of Industry.
- Minister of Employment and Immigration
  - 4 November 1993 – 24 January 1996: Lloyd Axworthy
  - 25 January 1996 – 11 July 1996: Douglas Young
  - Became Minister of Human Resources Development.
- Minister of Energy, Mines and Resources
  - 4 November 1993 – 11 January 1995: Anne McLellan
  - Became Minister of Natural Resources.
- Minister of the Environment
  - 4 November 1993 – 24 January 1996: Sheila Copps
  - 25 January 1996 – 10 June 1997: Sergio Marchi
  - 11 June 1997 – 2 August 1999: Christine Stewart
  - 3 August 1999 – 12 December 2003: David Anderson
- Minister of Finance
  - 4 November 1993 – 2 June 2002: Paul Martin
  - 2 June 2002 – 12 December 2003: John Manley
- Minister of Fisheries and Oceans
  - 4 November 1993 – 8 January 1996: Brian Tobin
  - 25 January 1996 – 10 June 1997: Fred J. Mifflin
  - 11 June 1997 – 2 August 1999: David Anderson
  - 3 August 1999 – 14 January 2002: Herb Dhaliwal
  - 15 January 2002 – 12 December 2003: Robert G. Thibault
- Minister of Foreign Affairs
  - Was Secretary of State for External Affairs.
  - 13 May 1995 – 24 January 1996 André Ouellet
  - 25 January 1996 – 16 October 2000 Lloyd Axworthy
  - 17 October 2000 – 15 January 2002 John Manley
  - 16 January 2002 – 12 December 2003 Bill Graham
- Minister of Forestry
  - 4 November 1993 – 11 January 1995: Anne McLellan
  - Became Minister of Natural Resources.
- Minister of Health
  - Was Minister of National Health and Welfare.
  - 12 July 1996 – 10 June 1997: David Charles Dingwall
  - 11 June 1997 – 14 January 2002: Allan Rock
  - 15 January 2002 – 12 December 2003: Anne McLellan
- Minister of Human Resources Development
  - Was Minister of Employment and Immigration.
  - 12 July 1996 – 3 October 1996: Douglas Young
  - 4 October 1996 – 2 August 1999: Pierre Pettigrew
  - 3 August 1999 – 12 December 2003: Jane Stewart
- Minister of Indian Affairs and Northern Development
  - 4 November 1993 – 10 June 1997: Ron Irwin
  - 11 June 1997 – 2 August 1999: Jane Stewart
  - 3 August 1999 – 12 December 2003: Robert Daniel Nault
- Minister of Industry
  - Was Minister of Consumer and Corporate Affairs and Minister of Industry, Science and Technology.
  - 29 March 1995 – 16 October 2000: John Manley
  - 17 October 2000 – 14 January 2002: Brian Tobin
  - 15 January 2002 – 12 December 2003: Allan Rock
- Minister of Industry, Science and Technology
  - 4 November 1993 – 28 March 1995: John Manley
  - Became Minister of Industry.
- Minister for International Cooperation
  - 25 January 1996 – 3 October 1996: Pierre Pettigrew
  - 4 October 1996 – 10 June 1997: Don Boudria
  - 11 June 1997 – 2 August 1999: Diane Marleau
  - 3 August 1999 – 14 January 2002: Maria Minna
  - 15 January 2002 – 12 December 2003: Susan Whelan
- Minister for International Trade
  - 4 November 1993 – 24 January 1996: Roy MacLaren
  - 25 January 1996 – 10 June 1997: Arthur C. Eggleton
  - 11 June 1997 – 2 August 1999: Sergio Marchi
  - 3 August 1999 – 12 December 2003: Pierre Pettigrew
- Minister of Intergovernmental Affairs
  - 4 November 1993 – 24 January 1996: Marcel Massé
  - 25 January 1996 – 12 December 2003: Stéphane Dion
- Minister of Justice
  - 4 November 1993 – 10 June 1997: Allan Rock
  - 11 June 1997 – 14 January 2002: Anne McLellan
  - 15 January 2002 – 12 December 2003: Martin Cauchon
- Attorney General of Canada
  - 4 November 1993 – 12 December 2003: The Minister of Justice (Ex officio)
  - 4 November 1993 – 10 June 1997: Allan Rock
  - 11 June 1997 – 14 January 2002: Anne McLellan
  - 15 January 2002 – 12 December 2003: Martin Cauchon
- Minister of Labour
  - 4 November 1993 – 21 February 1995: Lloyd Axworthy
  - 22 February 1995 – 24 January 1996: Lucienne Robillard
  - 25 January 1996 – 10 June 1997: Alfonso Gagliano
  - 11 June 1997 – 22 November 1998: Lawrence MacAulay
  - 23 November 1998 – 12 December 2003: Claudette Bradshaw
- Minister of Multiculturalism and Citizenship
  - 4 November 1993 – 24 January 1996: Michel Dupuy
  - 25 January 1996 – 30 April 1996: Sheila Copps
  - 1 May 1996 – 18 June 1996: Vacant
  - 19 June 1996 – 11 July 1996: Sheila Copps
  - Became Minister of Canadian Heritage
- Minister of National Defence
  - 4 November 1993 – 4 October 1996: David Michael Collenette
  - 4 October 1996 – 10 June 1997: Douglas Young
  - 11 June 1997 – 26 May 2002: Arthur C. Eggleton
  - 26 May 2002 – 12 December 2003: John McCallum
- Minister of National Health and Welfare
  - 4 November 1993 – 24 January 1996: Diane Marleau
  - 25 January 1996 – 11 July 1996: David Charles Dingwall
  - Became Minister of Health.
- Minister of National Revenue
  - 4 November 1993 – 24 January 1996: David Anderson
  - 25 January 1996 – 10 June 1997: Jane Stewart
  - 11 June 1997 – 2 August 1999: Herb Dhaliwal
  - 3 August 1999 – 14 January 2002: Martin Cauchon
  - 15 January 2002 – 12 December 2003: Elinor Caplan
- Minister of Natural Resources
  - Was Minister of Energy, Mines and Resources and Minister of Forestry.
  - 12 January 1995 – 10 June 1997: Anne McLellan
  - 11 June 1997 – 14 January 2002: Ralph Goodale
  - 15 January 2002 – 12 December 2003: Herb Dhaliwal
- Minister of Public Works
  - 4 November 1993 – 24 January 1996: David Charles Dingwall
  - 25 January 1996 – 11 July 1996: Diane Marleau
  - Became Minister of Public Works and Government Services.
- Minister of Public Works and Government Services
  - Was Minister of Public Works and Minister of Supply and Services.
  - 12 July 1996 – 10 June 1997: Diane Marleau
  - 11 June 1997 – 14 January 2002: Alfonso Gagliano
  - 15 January 2002 – 25 May 2002: Don Boudria
  - 26 May 2002 – 12 December 2003: Ralph Goodale
- Minister of Supply and Services
  - 4 November 1993 – 24 January 1996: David Charles Dingwall
  - 25 January 1996 – 11 July 1996: Diane Marleau
  - Became Minister of Public Works and Government Services.
- Minister of Transport
  - 4 November 1993 – 24 January 1996: Douglas Young
  - 25 January 1996 – 10 June 1997: David Anderson
  - 11 June 1997 – 12 December 2003: David Michael Collenette
- Minister of Veterans Affairs
  - 4 November 1993 – 4 October 1996: David Michael Collenette
  - 4 October 1996 – 10 June 1997: Douglas Young
  - 11 June 1997 – 2 August 1999: Fred J. Mifflin
  - 3 August 1999 – 16 October 2000: George Baker
  - 17 October 2000 – 14 January 2002: Ronald J. Duhamel
  - 15 January 2002 – 12 December 2003: Rey Pagtakhan
- Minister of Western Economic Diversification
  - 4 November 1993 – 24 January 1996: Lloyd Axworthy
  - 25 January 1996 – 16 October 2000: John Manley
  - 17 October 2000 – 14 January 2002: Brian Tobin
  - 15 January 2002 – 12 December 2003: Allan Rock
- Leader of the Government in the House of Commons
  - 4 November 1993 – 10 June 1997: Herb Gray
  - 11 June 1997 – 14 January 2002: Don Boudria
  - 15 January 2002 – 25 May 2002: Ralph Goodale
  - 26 May 2002 – 12 December 2003: Don Boudria
- Leader of the Government in the Senate
  - 4 November 1993 – 10 June 1997: Joyce Fairbairn
  - 11 June 1997 – 3 October 1999: Bernard Alasdair Graham
  - 4 October 1999 – 8 January 2001: J. Bernard Boudreau
  - 9 January 2001 – 12 December 2003: Sharon Carstairs
- President of the Privy Council
  - 4 November 1993 – 24 January 1996: Marcel Massé
  - 25 January 1996 – 12 December 2003: Stéphane Dion
- President of the Treasury Board
  - 4 November 1993 – 24 January 1996: Arthur C. Eggleton
  - 25 January 1996 – 2 August 1999: Marcel Massé
  - 3 August 1999 – 12 December 2003: Lucienne Robillard
- Secretary of State of Canada
  - 4 November 1993 – 24 January 1996: Sergio Marchi
  - 25 January 1996 – 12 July 1996: Lucienne Robillard
- Secretary of State for External Affairs
  - 4 November 1993 – 12 May 1995: André Ouellet
  - Became Minister of Foreign Affairs.
- Solicitor General of Canada
  - 4 November 1993 – 10 June 1997: Herb Gray
  - 11 June 1997 – 23 November 1998: Andy Scott
  - 23 November 1998 – 22 October 2002: Lawrence MacAulay
  - 22 October 2002 – 12 December 2003: Wayne Easter
- Minister of State (Atlantic Canada Opportunities Agency)
  - 17 October 2000 – 8 January 2001: J. Bernard Boudreau
  - 9 January 2001 – 15 January 2002: Robert G. Thibault
  - 16 January 2002 – 12 December 2003: Gerry Byrne
- Minister of State (Deputy Prime Minister)
  - 11 June 1997 – 14 January 2002: Herb Gray
  - 15 January 2002 – 1 June 2002: John Manley
- Minister of State (Leader of the Government at the House of Commons)
  - 11 June 1997 – 14 January 2002: Don Boudria
  - 15 January 2002 – 25 May 2002: Ralph Goodale
  - 26 May 2002 – 12 December 2003: Don Boudria
- Minister responsible for La Francophonie
  - 25 January 1996 – 3 October 1996: Pierre Pettigrew
  - 4 October 1996 – 10 June 1997: Don Boudria
- Minister responsible for Infrastructure
  - 4 November 1993 – 24 January 1996: Arthur C. Eggleton
  - 25 January 1996 – 2 August 1999: Marcel Massé
- Minister responsible for Public Service Renewal
  - 4 November 1993 – 24 January 1996: Marcel Massé
- Minister responsible for the Economic Development Agency of Canada for the Regions of Quebec
  - 17 October 2000 – 14 January 2002: Brian Tobin
- Minister responsible for the Federal Office of Regional Development - Quebec
  - 4 November 1993 – 24 January 1996: Paul Martin
  - 25 January 1996 – 10 June 1997: John Manley
- Minister with political responsibility for Quebec
  - 15 January 2002 – 12 December 2003: Martin Cauchon
- Minister with special responsibility for Literacy
  - 4 November 1993 – 10 June 1997: Joyce Fairbairn

== Ministries not Cabinet members ==
- Secretary of State (Agriculture and Agri-Food)
  - 18 June 1997 – 2 August 1999: Gilbert Normand
- Secretary of State (Agriculture and Agri-Food, Fisheries and Oceans)
  - 15 September 1994 – 10 June 1997: Fernand Robichaud
- Secretary of State (Amateur Sport)
  - 3 August 1999 – 14 January 2002: Denis Coderre
  - 15 January 2002 – 17 June 2003: Paul DeVillers
- Secretary of State (Asia Pacific)
  - 4 November 1993 – 8 January 2001: Raymond Chan
  - 9 January 2001 – 14 January 2002: Rey Pagtakhan
  - 15 January 2002 – 12 December 2003: David Kilgour
- Secretary of State (Atlantic Canada Opportunities Agency)
  - 25 January 1996 – 10 June 1997: Lawrence MacAulay
  - 11 June 1997 – 2 August 1999: Fred J. Mifflin
  - 3 August 1999 – 16 October 2000: George Baker
- Secretary of State (Central and Eastern Europe and Middle East)
  - 15 January 2002 – 12 December 2003: Gar Knutson
- Secretary of State (Children and Youth)
  - 11 June 1997 – 12 December 2003: Ethel Blondin-Andrew
- Secretary of State (Deputy Leader of the Government in the House of Commons)
  - 15 September 1994 – 14 January 2002: Alfonso Gagliano
  - 15 January 2002 – 12 December 2003: Paul DeVillers
- Secretary of State (Economic Development Agency of Canada for the Regions of Quebec)
  - Was Secretary of State (Federal Office of Regional Development - Quebec).
  - 23 February 1998 – 14 January 2002: Martin Cauchon
  - 15 January 2002 – 12 December 2003: Claude Drouin
- Secretary of State (Federal Economic Development Initiative for Northern Ontario)
  - 3 August 1999 – 12 December 2003: Andrew Mitchell
- Secretary of State (Federal Office of Regional Development - Quebec)
  - 25 January 1996 – 22 February 1998: Martin Cauchon
  - Became Secretary of State (Economic Development Agency of Canada for the Regions of Quebec).
- Secretary of State (Fisheries and Oceans)
  - 18 June 1997 – 2 August 1999: Gilbert Normand
- Secretary of State (Francophonie)
  - 3 August 1999 – 14 January 2002: Ronald J. Duhamel
  - 15 January 2002 – 12 December 2003: Denis Paradis
- Secretary of State (Indian Affairs and Northern Development)
  - 15 January 2002 – 12 December 2003: Stephen Owen
- Secretary of State (International Financial Institutions)
  - 4 November 1993 – 10 June 1997: Douglas Peters
  - 11 June 1997 – 14 January 2002: James Scott Peterson
  - 15 January 2002 – 25 May 2002: John McCallum
  - 26 May 2002 – 12 December 2003: Maurizio Bevilacqua
- Secretary of State (Latin America and Africa)
  - 4 November 1993 – 10 June 1997: Christine Stewart
  - 11 June 1997 – 14 January 2002: David Kilgour
  - 15 January 2002 – 12 December 2003: Denis Paradis
- Secretary of State (Multiculturalism)
  - 4 November 1993 – 24 January 1996: Sheila Finestone
  - 25 January 1996 – 27 January 2002: Hedy Fry
  - 28 January 2002 – 25 May 2002: Claudette Bradshaw
  - 26 May 2002 – 12 December 2003: Jean Augustine
- Secretary of State (Parks)
  - 11 June 1997 – 2 August 1999: Andrew Mitchell
- Secretary of State (Parliamentary Affairs)
  - 4 November 1993 – 14 September 1994: Fernand Robichaud
  - 15 September 1994 – 24 January 1996: Alfonso Gagliano
- Secretary of State (Physical Activity and Sport)
  - 17 June 2003 – 12 December 2003: Paul DeVillers
- Secretary of State (Rural Development)
  - 3 August 1999 – 12 December 2003: Andrew Mitchell
- Secretary of State (Science, Research and Development)
  - 4 November 1993 – 10 June 1997: Jon Gerrard
  - 11 June 1997 – 2 August 1999: Ronald J. Duhamel
  - 3 August 1999 – 14 January 2002: Gilbert Normand
  - 15 January 2002 – 25 May 2002: Maurizio Bevilacqua
  - 26 May 2002 – 12 December 2003: Rey Pagtakhan
- Secretary of State (Selected Crown Corporations)
  - 11 April 2003 – 12 December 2003: Steven W. Mahoney
- Secretary of State (Status of Women)
  - 4 November 1993 – 24 January 1996: Sheila Finestone
  - 25 January 1996 – 27 January 2002: Hedy Fry
  - 28 January 2002 – 25 May 2002: Claudette Bradshaw
  - 26 May 2002 – 12 December 2003: Jean Augustine
- Secretary of State (Training and Youth)
  - 4 November 1993 – 10 June 1997: Ethel Blondin-Andrew
- Secretary of State (Veterans)
  - 4 November 1993 – 10 June 1997: Lawrence MacAulay
- Secretary of State (Western Economic Diversification)
  - 25 January 1996 – 10 June 1997: Jon Gerrard
  - 11 June 1997 – 14 January 2002: Ronald J. Duhamel
  - 15 January 2002 – 12 December 2003: Stephen Owen

== Succession ==
Ministries of Canada
Preceded by 25th Canadian Ministry	26th Canadian Ministry; 1993–2003	Succeeded by 27th Canadian Ministry
