= Minister of Western Economic Diversification =

Minister responsible for Prairies Economic Development Canada of Canada
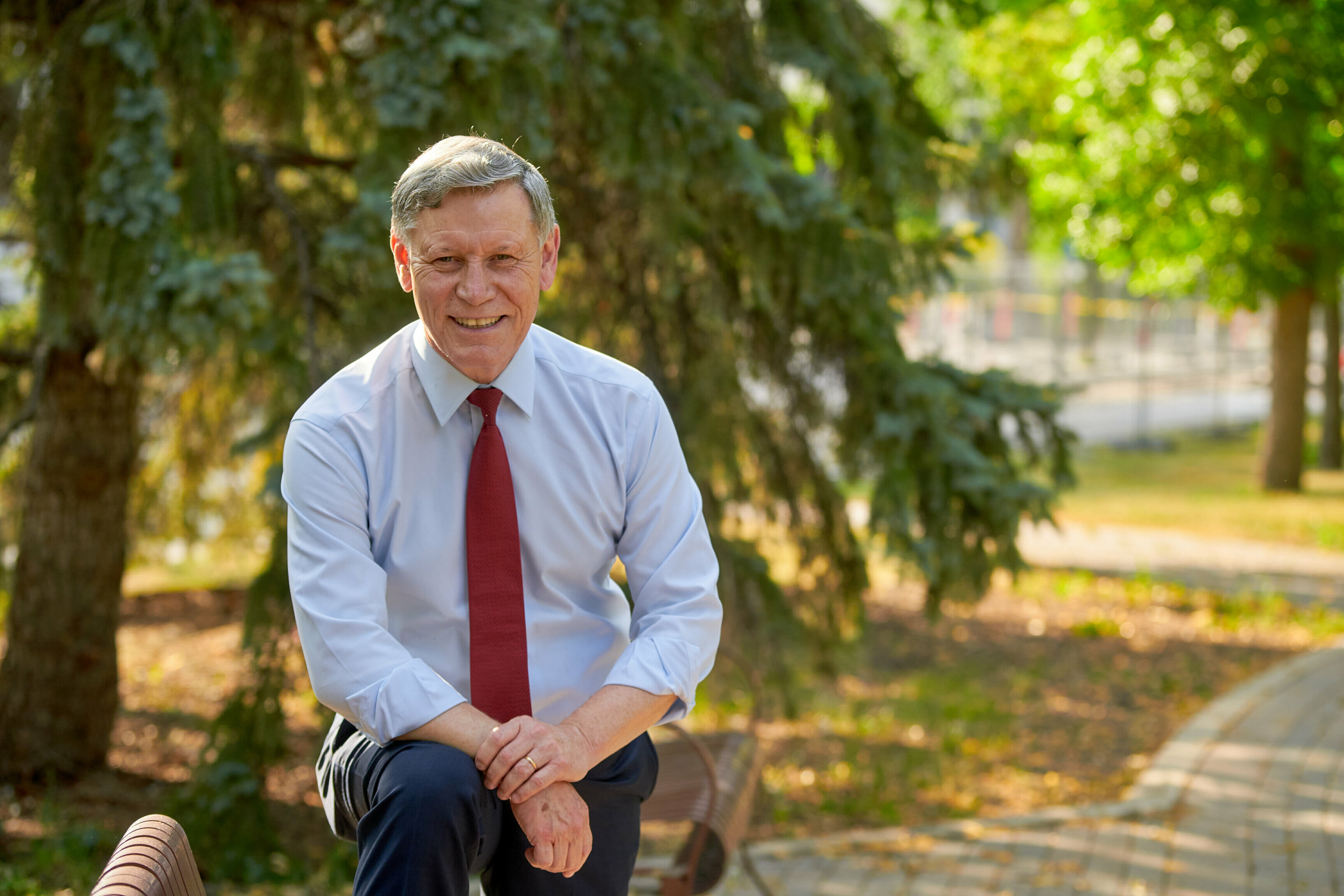
- Incumbent; Terry Duguid since December 20, 2024
- Government of Canada
- Style: The Honourable
- Member of: Cabinet; Privy Council
- Appointer: Governor General of Canada
- Term length: At Her Majesty's pleasure
- Inaugural holder: Bill McKnight
- Formation: June 28, 1988

The Minister responsible for Prairies Economic Development Canada (French: Ministre responsable de Développement économique des Prairies Canada du Canada) is the Minister of the Crown in the Canadian Cabinet who served as the chief executive of Western Economic Diversification Canada (WD). The post was traditionally held by an MP from Western Canada, although occasionally the responsibilities were accorded to a more senior cabinet minister, such as the Industry minister.

As of November 4, 2015, WD, along with Canada's other regional development agencies, is operated as part of the Innovation, Science and Economic Development (ISED) portfolio, led by Minister Navdeep Bains.

Related regional development posts include Minister for the Atlantic Canada Opportunities Agency and Minister of the Economic Development Agency of Canada for the Regions of Quebec, positions which have also been folded into ISED under Minister Bains.

On August 5, 2021, the Government of Canada announced that Western Economic Diversification would be divided into two new agencies—PacifiCan for BC; and PrairiesCan for Alberta, Manitoba, and Saskatchewan.

== Ministers ==
Key:

Liberal Party of Canada
Progressive Conservative Party of Canada
Conservative Party of Canada

No.	Name	Term of office		Political party	Ministry
Minister of Western Economic Diversification
1	Bill McKnight	June 28, 1988	January 29, 1989	Progressive Conservative	24 (Mulroney)
2	Charlie Mayer	January 30, 1989	January 3, 1993	Progressive Conservative	24 (Mulroney)
3	Mary Collins	January 4, 1993	June 24, 1993	Progressive Conservative	24 (Mulroney)
4	Larry Schneider	June 25, 1993	November 3, 1993	Progressive Conservative	25 (Campbell)
5	Lloyd Axworthy	November 4, 1993	January 24, 1996	Liberal	26 (Chrétien)
6	John Manley	January 25, 1996	October 16, 2000	Liberal	26 (Chrétien)
7	Brian Tobin	October 17, 2000	January 14, 2002	Liberal	26 (Chrétien)
8	Allan Rock	January 15, 2002	December 11, 2003	Liberal	26 (Chrétien)
9	Rey Pagtakhan	December 12, 2003	July 20, 2004	Liberal	27 (Martin)
10	Stephen Owen	July 20, 2004	February 6, 2006	Conservative	27 (Martin)
11	Carol Skelton	February 6, 2006	January 4, 2007	Conservative	28 (Harper)
12	Rona Ambrose	January 4, 2007	October 30, 2008	Conservative	28 (Harper)
13	Jim Prentice	October 30, 2008	November 5, 2010	Conservative	28 (Harper)
(12)	Rona Ambrose	November 5, 2010	May 18, 2011	Conservative	28 (Harper)
14	Lynne Yelich	May 18, 2011	July 16, 2013	Conservative	28 (Harper)
15	Michelle Rempel	July 16, 2013	November 4, 2015	Conservative	28 (Harper)
16	Navdeep Bains	November 4, 2015	October 26, 2021	Liberal	29 (Trudeau)
Minister responsible for Prairies Economic Development Canada
17	Dan Vandal	October 26, 2021	December 20, 2024	Liberal	29 (Trudeau)
18	Terry Duguid	December 20, 2024	Incumbent	Liberal	29 (Trudeau)
