= 28th Canadian Ministry =

Government cabinet of Canada (2006–2015)

28th Canadian Ministry 28e conseil des ministres du Canada
- 28th ministry of Canada

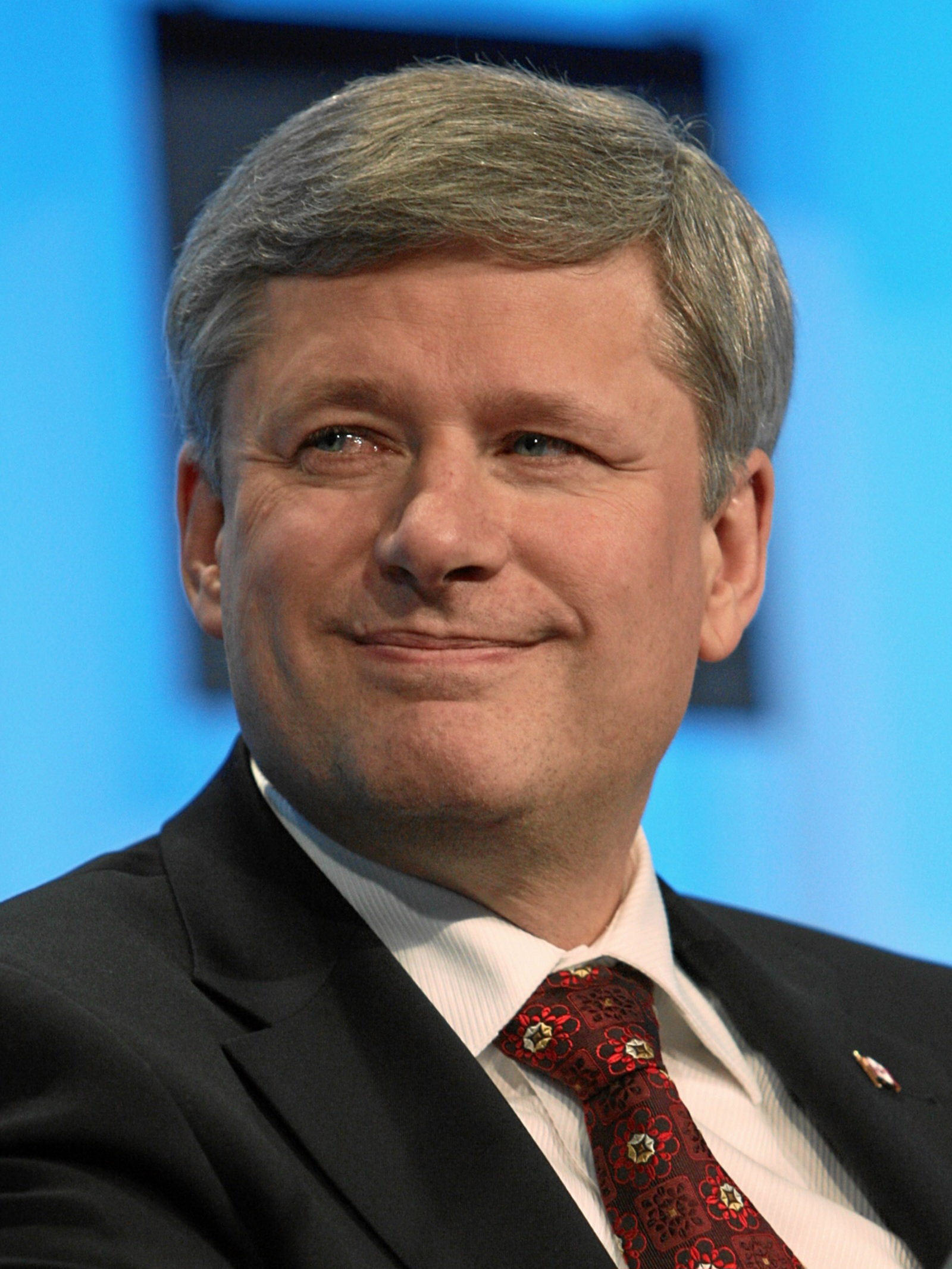
- Date formed: February 6, 2006
- Date dissolved: November 4, 2015

People and organizations
- Monarch: Elizabeth II
- Governor General: Michaëlle Jean (2006–2010); David Johnston (2010–2015)
- Prime Minister: Stephen Harper
- Prime Minister's history: Premiership of Stephen Harper
- No. of ministers: 39
- Ministers removed: 30
- Member party: Conservative
- Status in legislature: Minority (2006–2011); Majority (2011–2015)
- Opposition cabinet: 39th (2006–2008); 40th (2008–2011); 41st (2011–2015)
- Opposition party: Liberal (2006–2011); New Democratic (2011–2015)
- Opposition leader: Bill Graham (2006); Stéphane Dion (2006–2008); Michael Ignatieff (2008–2011); Jack Layton (2011); Nycole Turmel (2011–2012); Thomas Mulcair (2012–2015)

History
- Elections: 2006, 2008, 2011
- Outgoing election: 2015
- Legislature terms: 39th Canadian Parliament; 40th Canadian Parliament; 41st Canadian Parliament
- Budgets: 2006, 2007, 2008, 2009, 2010, 2011, 2012, 2013, 2014, 2015
- Predecessor: 27th Canadian Ministry
- Successor: 29th Canadian Ministry

The Twenty-Eighth Canadian Ministry was the Cabinet, chaired by Prime Minister Stephen Harper, that governed Canada from the beginning of the 39th Parliament to the end of the 41st Parliament. Its original members were sworn into the Queen's Privy Council for Canada on February 6, 2006, exactly two weeks after the 2006 federal election and nine weeks and six days after the end of the 38th Canadian Parliament. Smaller than its recent predecessors, the Conservative Cabinet originally consisted of 27 members, including the Prime Minister. On January 4, 2007, five Secretaries of State were added to the ministry who are not members of the Cabinet itself. The cabinet resigned on the morning of November 4, 2015.

Only 24 of the original members were elected to serve as Conservative Members of Parliament (MP) in 2006; Senator Marjory LeBreton was the Leader of the Government in the Senate. The other two choices that raised some controversy were David Emerson, who was elected as a Liberal, but crossed the floor between the election and the swearing-in of the Cabinet to serve as Minister of International Trade, of the Pacific Gateway, and of the Vancouver-Whistler Olympics, and Michael Fortier, a Montreal-area member of the former Progressive Conservatives and co-chair of the Conservatives' 2006 federal campaign, who was not elected as an MP but was named a Senator on February 27, 2006 and subsequently served as Minister of Public Works and Government Services.

The reason given for the appointments of Emerson and Fortier was that the Conservatives were completely shut out of the three most populous cities in Canada – Montreal, Toronto, and Vancouver. The Liberals were the only party to win seats in all three, with the Bloc represented in Montreal and the NDP in Toronto and Vancouver. Emerson's riding was Vancouver Kingsway, while Fortier lived and worked in the Montreal-Laval area and ran for the riding of Laval West for the Tories in 2000. The only major city this left out was Toronto, although the Conservatives indicated that they considered enough Cabinet Ministers to be from the Greater Toronto Area, including Jim Flaherty and Bev Oda, to adequately represent the city in Cabinet.

Contrary to precedent, Harper did not name a Deputy Prime Minister, confounding rumours that Quebec lieutenant Lawrence Cannon or Conservative deputy leader Peter MacKay might be awarded the honorary post. Harper's explanation was that, instead, any replacement Prime Minister would be named as required and this assignment could be conferred upon different ministers. As of 2026, it remains the most recent Canadian cabinet formed by the Conservative Party of Canada.

== List of ministers ==
=== By minister ===
Note: This is in Order of Precedence, which is established by the chronological order of appointment to the Queen's Privy Council for Canada, then in order of election or appointment to parliament for ministers who joined the Privy Council on the same day.

Minister	Portfolio	Tenure
Stephen Harper	Prime Minister	February 6, 2006 – November 4, 2015
Bernard Valcourt	Minister of Aboriginal Affairs and Northern Development	February 22, 2013 – November 4, 2015
Bernard Valcourt	Associate Minister of National Defence	July 4, 2012 – February 22, 2013
Bernard Valcourt	Minister of State (Atlantic Canada Opportunities Agency)	May 18, 2011 – February 22, 2012
Bernard Valcourt	Minister of State (La Francophonie)	May 18, 2011 – February 22, 2012
Rob Nicholson	Minister of Foreign Affairs	February 9, 2015 – November 4, 2015
Rob Nicholson	Minister of National Defence	July 15, 2013 – February 9, 2015
Rob Nicholson	Minister of Justice and Attorney-General	January 4, 2007 – July 15, 2013
Rob Nicholson	Leader of the Government in the House of Commons	February 6, 2006 – January 4, 2007
Rob Nicholson	Minister for Democratic Reform	February 6, 2006 – January 4, 2007
Peter MacKay	Minister of Justice and Attorney-General	July 15, 2013 – November 4, 2015
Peter MacKay	Minister of National Defence	August 14, 2007 – July 15, 2013
Peter MacKay	Minister of Foreign Affairs	February 6, 2006 – August 14, 2007
Peter MacKay	Minister of the Atlantic Gateway	February 6, 2006 – January 19, 2010
Peter MacKay	Minister for the Atlantic Canada Opportunities Agency	February 6, 2006 – October 30, 2008
Rona Ambrose	Minister of Health	July 15, 2013 – November 4, 2015
Rona Ambrose	Minister of Public Works and Government Services	January 9, 2010 – July 15, 2013
Rona Ambrose	Minister of State (Status of Women)	April 9, 2010 – July 15, 2013
Rona Ambrose	Minister of Western Economic Diversification	November 5, 2010 – May 17, 2011
Rona Ambrose	Minister of Labour	October 30, 2008 – January 19, 2010
Rona Ambrose	President of the Queen's Privy Council for Canada	January 4, 2007 – October 30, 2008
Rona Ambrose	Minister of Intergovernmental Affairs	January 4, 2007 – October 30, 2008
Rona Ambrose	Minister of Western Economic Diversification	January 4, 2007 – October 30, 2008
Rona Ambrose	Minister of the Environment	February 6, 2006 – January 4, 2007
Diane Finley	Minister of Public Works and Government Services	July 15, 2013 – November 4, 2015
Diane Finley	Minister of Human Resources and Skills Development	October 30, 2008 – July 15, 2013
Diane Finley	Minister of Citizenship and Immigration	January 4, 2007 – October 30, 2008
Diane Finley	Minister of Human Resources and Social Development	February 6, 2006 – January 4, 2007
Tony Clement	President of the Treasury Board	May 18, 2011 – November 4, 2015
Tony Clement	Minister for the Federal Economic Development Initiative for Northern Ontario	February 6, 2006 – July 14, 2013
Tony Clement	Minister of Industry	October 30, 2008 – May 18, 2011
Tony Clement	Minister of Health	February 6, 2006 – October 30, 2008
Peter Van Loan	Leader of the Government in the House of Commons	May 18, 2011 – November 4, 2015
Peter Van Loan	Minister of International Trade	January 19, 2010 – May 18, 2011
Peter Van Loan	Minister of Public Safety	October 30, 2008 – January 19, 2010
Peter Van Loan	Leader of the Government in the House of Commons	January 4, 2007 – October 30, 2008
Peter Van Loan	Minister for Democratic Reform	January 4, 2007 – October 30, 2008
Peter Van Loan	President of the Queen's Privy Council for Canada	November 27, 2006 – January 4, 2007
Peter Van Loan	Minister of Intergovernmental Affairs	November 27, 2006 – January 4, 2007
Peter Van Loan	Minister for Sport	November 27, 2006 – January 4, 2007
Jason Kenney	Minister of National Defence	February 9, 2015 – November 4, 2015
Jason Kenney	Minister of Multiculturalism and Citizenship	February 9, 2015 – November 4, 2015
Jason Kenney	Minister of Employment and Social Development	July 15, 2013 – February 9, 2015
Jason Kenney	Minister of Citizenship and Immigration	October 30, 2008 – July 14, 2013
Jason Kenney	Secretary of State for Multiculturalism and Canadian Identity	January 4, 2007 – October 30, 2008
Gerry Ritz	Minister of Agriculture and Agri–Food	August 14, 2007 – November 4, 2015
Gerry Ritz	Minister for the Canadian Wheat Board	August 14, 2007 – November 4, 2015
Gerry Ritz	Secretary of State for Small Business and Tourism	January 4, 2007 – August 14, 2007
Christian Paradis	Minister of International Cooperation	July 15, 2013 – November 4, 2015
Christian Paradis	Minister of Industry	May 18, 2011 – July 14, 2013
Christian Paradis	Minister of State (Agriculture)	May 18, 2011 – July 14, 2013
Christian Paradis	Minister of Natural Resources	January 19, 2010 – May 18, 2011
Christian Paradis	Minister of the Economic Development Agency of Canada for the Regions of Quebec	October 30, 2008 – May 18, 2011
Christian Paradis	Minister of Public Works and Government Services	June 25, 2008 – January 19, 2010
James Moore	Minister of Industry	July 15, 2013 – November 4, 2015
James Moore	Minister of Official Languages	October 30, 2008 – July 14, 2013
James Moore	Minister of Canadian Heritage	October 30, 2008 – July 14, 2013
James Moore	Minister of Aboriginal Affairs and Northern Development	February 15, 2013 – February 21, 2013
James Moore	Secretary of State for the Asia Pacific Gateway; Vancouver-Whistler Olympics; Official Languages	June 25, 2008 – October 30, 2008
Denis Lebel	Minister of Intergovernmental Affairs; President of the Queen's Privy Council for Canada; Minister of Infrastructure and Communities	March 14, 2013 – November 4, 2015
Denis Lebel	Minister of the Economic Development Agency of Canada for the Regions of Quebec	May 18, 2011 – November 4, 2015
Denis Lebel	Minister of Transport, Infrastructure and Communities	May 18, 2011 – July 14, 2013
Denis Lebel	Minister of State (Economic Development Agency of Canada for the Regions of Quebec)	October 30, 2008 – May 18, 2011
Leona Aglukkaq	Minister of the Environment	July 15, 2013 – November 4, 2015
Leona Aglukkaq	Minister of Health	May 18, 2011 – July 14, 2013
Leona Aglukkaq	Minister of the Canadian Northern Economic Development Agency	October 30, 2008 – July 14, 2013
Lisa Raitt	Minister of Transport	July 15, 2013 – November 4, 2015
Lisa Raitt	Minister of Labour	January 19, 2010 – July 14, 2013
Lisa Raitt	Minister of Natural Resources	October 30, 2008 – January 19, 2010
Gail Shea	Minister of Fisheries and Oceans	July 15, 2013 – November 4, 2015
Gail Shea	Minister of National Revenue	May 18, 2011 – July 14, 2013
Gail Shea	Minister of Fisheries and Oceans	October 30, 2008 – May 18, 2011
Julian Fantino	Associate Minister of National Defence	January 4, 2015 – November 4, 2015
Julian Fantino	Minister of Veterans Affairs	July 15, 2013 – January 5, 2015
Julian Fantino	Minister of International Cooperation	July 4, 2012 – July 14, 2013
Julian Fantino	Associate Minister of National Defence	May 18, 2011 – July 4, 2012
Julian Fantino	Minister of State (Seniors)	January 4, 2011 – May 18, 2011
Steven Blaney	Minister of Public Safety	July 15, 2013 – November 4, 2015
Steven Blaney	Minister of Veterans Affairs	May 18, 2011 – July 14, 2013
Edward Fast	Minister of International Trade	May 18, 2011 – November 4, 2015
Edward Fast	Minister for the Asia–Pacific Gateway	May 18, 2011 – November 4, 2015
Joe Oliver	Minister of Finance	March 19, 2014 – November 4, 2015
Joe Oliver	Minister of Natural Resources	May 18, 2011 – March 19, 2014
Kerry-Lynne Findlay	Minister of National Revenue	July 15, 2013 – November 4, 2015
Kerry-Lynne Findlay	Associate Minister of National Defence	February 22, 2012 – July 14, 2013
Shelly Glover	Minister of Canadian Heritage and Official Languages	July 15, 2013 – November 4, 2015
Chris Alexander	Minister of Citizenship and Immigration	July 15, 2013 – November 4, 2015
Kellie Leitch	Minister of Labour	July 15, 2013 – November 4, 2015
Kellie Leitch	Minister of Status of Women	July 15, 2013 – November 4, 2015
Pierre Poilievre	Minister of Employment and Social Development	February 9, 2015 – November 4, 2015
Pierre Poilievre	Minister of State (Democratic Reform)	July 15, 2013 – February 9, 2015
Erin O'Toole	Minister of Veterans Affairs	January 5, 2015 – November 4, 2015
Maxime Bernier	Minister of State (Small Business and Tourism)	18 May 2011 – 4 Nov. 2015
Maxime Bernier	Minister of State (Agriculture)	July 15, 2013 – November 4, 2015
Maxime Bernier	Minister of Foreign Affairs	August 14, 2007 – May 26, 2008
Maxime Bernier	Minister of Industry	February 6, 2006 – August 14, 2007
John Duncan	Chief Government Whip	July 14, 2013 – November 4, 2015
John Duncan	Minister of Aboriginal Affairs and Northern Development^{1}	August 6, 2010 – February 15, 2013
John Duncan	Federal Interlocutor for Métis and Non-Status Indians	August 6, 2010 – May 18, 2011
John Duncan	Minister of the Canadian Northern Economic Development Agency	August 6, 2010 – May 18, 2011
Lynne Yelich	Minister of State of Foreign Affairs (Americas and Consular Affairs)	July 15, 2013 – November 4, 2015
Lynne Yelich	Minister of State (Western Economic Diversification)	October 30, 2008 – July 14, 2013
Gary Goodyear	Minister of State (Federal Economic Development Agency for Southern Ontario)	October 30, 2008 – November 4, 2015
Gary Goodyear	Minister of State (Science and Technology)	October 20, 2008 – July 14, 2013
Rob Moore	Minister of State (Atlantic Canada Opportunities Agency)	July 15, 2013 – November 4, 2015
Rob Moore	Minister of State (Small Business and Tourism)	January 19, 2010 – May 17, 2011
Tim Uppal	Minister of State (Multiculturalism)	July 15, 2013 – November 4, 2015
Tim Uppal	Minister of State (Democratic Reform)	May 18, 2011 – July 14, 2013
Alice Wong	Minister of State (Seniors)	May 18, 2011 – November 4, 2015
Bal Gosal	Minister of State (Sport)	May 18, 2011 – November 4, 2015
Kevin Sorenson	Minister of State (Finance)	July 15, 2013 – November 4, 2015
Greg Rickford	Minister of Natural Resources	March 19, 2014 – November 4, 2015
Greg Rickford	Minister of State (Science and Technology)	July 15, 2013 – March 19, 2014
Candice Bergen	Minister of State (Social Development)	July 15, 2013 – November 4, 2015
Michelle Rempel	Minister of State (Western Economic Diversification)	July 15, 2013 – November 4, 2015
Ed Holder	Minister of State (Science and Technology)	March 19, 2014 – November 4, 2015

^{1} Styled as Minister of Indian Affairs and Northern Development until May 18, 2011

=== By portfolio ===
Members of the 28th Ministry
Portfolio	Minister	Tenure
Prime Minister of Canada	Stephen Harper	February 6, 2006 – November 4, 2015
Minister of Agriculture and Agri-Food	Chuck Strahl	February 6, 2006 – August 14, 2007
Minister of Agriculture and Agri-Food	Gerry Ritz	August 14, 2007 – November 4, 2015
Minister for the purpose of the Atlantic Canada Opportunities Agency Act	Peter MacKay	February 6, 2006 – January 19, 2010
Minister for the purpose of the Atlantic Canada Opportunities Agency Act	Keith Ashfield	January 19, 2010 – July 14, 2013
Minister for the purpose of the Atlantic Canada Opportunities Agency Act	Bernard Valcourt	July 15, 2013 – November 4, 2015
Minister of Canadian Heritage	Bev Oda	February 6, 2006 – August 14, 2007
Minister of Canadian Heritage	Josée Verner	August 14, 2007 – October 30, 2008
Minister of Canadian Heritage	James Moore	October 30, 2008 – July 14, 2013
Minister of Canadian Heritage	Shelly Glover	July 15, 2013 – November 4, 2015
Minister of Citizenship and Immigration	Monte Solberg	February 6, 2006 – January 4, 2007
Minister of Citizenship and Immigration	Diane Finley	January 4, 2007 – October 30, 2008
Minister of Citizenship and Immigration	Jason Kenney	October 30, 2008 – July 14, 2013
Minister of Citizenship and Immigration	Chris Alexander	July 15, 2013 – November 4, 2015
Minister of the Economic Development Agency of Canada for the Regions of Quebec	Jean-Pierre Blackburn	February 6, 2006 – October 30, 2008
Minister of the Economic Development Agency of Canada for the Regions of Quebec	Christian Paradis	October 30, 2008 – May 18, 2011
Minister of the Economic Development Agency of Canada for the Regions of Quebec	Denis Lebel	May 18, 2011 – November 4, 2015
Minister of the Environment	Rona Ambrose	February 6, 2006 – January 4, 2007
Minister of the Environment	John Baird	January 4, 2007 – October 30, 2008
Minister of the Environment	Jim Prentice	October 30, 2008 – November 5, 2010
Minister of the Environment	John Baird	November 5, 2010 – January 4, 2011
Minister of the Environment	Peter Kent	January 4, 2011 – July 15, 2013
Minister of the Environment	Leona Aglukkaq	July 15, 2013 – November 4, 2015
Minister of Finance	Jim Flaherty	February 6, 2006 – March 18, 2014
Minister of Finance	Joe Oliver	March 19, 2014 – November 4, 2015
Minister of Fisheries and Oceans	Loyola Hearn	February 6, 2006 – October 30, 2008
Minister of Fisheries and Oceans	Gail Shea	October 30, 2008 – May 18, 2011
Minister of Fisheries and Oceans	Keith Ashfield	May 18, 2011 – July 15, 2013
Minister of Fisheries and Oceans	Gail Shea	July 15, 2013 – November 4, 2015
Minister of Foreign Affairs	Peter MacKay	February 6, 2006 – August 14, 2007
Minister of Foreign Affairs	Maxime Bernier	August 14, 2007 – May 26, 2008
Minister of Foreign Affairs	David Emerson	May 29, 2008 – October 30, 2008
Minister of Foreign Affairs	Lawrence Cannon	October 30, 2008 – May 18, 2011
Minister of Foreign Affairs	John Baird	May 18, 2011 – February 3, 2015
Minister of Foreign Affairs	Rob Nicholson	February 9, 2015 – November 4, 2015
Minister of Health	Tony Clement	February 6, 2006 – October 30, 2008
Minister of Health	Leona Aglukkaq	October 30, 2008 – July 15, 2013
Minister of Health	Rona Ambrose	July 15, 2013 – November 4, 2015
Minister of Employment and Social Development	Diane Finley	February 6, 2006 – January 4, 2007
Minister of Employment and Social Development	Monte Solberg	January 4, 2007 – October 30, 2008
Minister of Employment and Social Development	Diane Finley	October 30, 2008 – July 15, 2013
Minister of Employment and Social Development	Jason Kenney	July 15, 2013 – February 9, 2015
Minister of Employment and Social Development	Pierre Poilievre	February 9, 2015 – November 4, 2015
Minister of Aboriginal Affairs and Northern Development	Jim Prentice	February 6, 2006 – August 14, 2007
Minister of Aboriginal Affairs and Northern Development	Chuck Strahl	August 14, 2007 – August 6, 2010
Minister of Aboriginal Affairs and Northern Development	John Duncan	August 6, 2010 – February 15, 2013
Minister of Aboriginal Affairs and Northern Development	James Moore	February 15, 2013 – February 22, 2013
Minister of Aboriginal Affairs and Northern Development	Bernard Valcourt	February 22, 2013 – November 4, 2015
Minister of Industry	Maxime Bernier	February 6, 2006 – August 14, 2007
Minister of Industry	Jim Prentice	August 14, 2007 – October 30, 2008
Minister of Industry	Tony Clement	October 30, 2008 – May 18, 2011
Minister of Industry	Christian Paradis	May 18, 2011 – July 15, 2013
Minister of Industry	James Moore	July 15, 2013 – November 4, 2015
Minister of Intergovernmental Affairs	Michael Chong	February 6, 2006 – November 7, 2006
Minister of Intergovernmental Affairs	Peter Van Loan	November 7, 2006 – January 4, 2007
Minister of Intergovernmental Affairs	Rona Ambrose	January 4, 2007 – October 30, 2008
Minister of Intergovernmental Affairs	Josée Verner	October 30, 2008 – May 18, 2011
Minister of Intergovernmental Affairs	Peter Penashue	May 18, 2011 – March 14, 2013
Minister of Intergovernmental Affairs	Denis Lebel	March 14, 2013 – November 4, 2015
Minister for International Cooperation	Josée Verner	February 6, 2006 – August 14, 2007
Minister for International Cooperation	Bev Oda	August 14, 2007 – July 4, 2012
Minister for International Cooperation	Julian Fantino	July 4, 2012 – July 15, 2013
Minister for International Cooperation	Christian Paradis	July 15, 2013 – November 4, 2015
Minister for International Trade	David Emerson	February 6, 2006 – June 25, 2008
Minister for International Trade	Michael Fortier	June 25, 2008 – October 30, 2008
Minister for International Trade	Stockwell Day	October 30, 2008 – January 19, 2010
Minister for International Trade	Peter Van Loan	January 19, 2010 – May 18, 2011
Minister for International Trade	Edward Fast	May 18, 2011 – November 4, 2015
Minister of Justice and Attorney General of Canada	Vic Toews	February 6, 2006 – January 4, 2007
Minister of Justice and Attorney General of Canada	Rob Nicholson	January 4, 2007 – July 15, 2013
Minister of Justice and Attorney General of Canada	Peter MacKay	July 15, 2013 – November 4, 2015
Minister of Labour	Jean-Pierre Blackburn	February 6, 2006 – October 30, 2008
Minister of Labour	Rona Ambrose	October 30, 2008 – January 19, 2010
Minister of Labour	Lisa Raitt	January 19, 2010 – July 15, 2013
Minister of Labour	Kellie Leitch	July 15, 2013 – November 4, 2015
Leader of the Government in the House of Commons	Rob Nicholson	February 6, 2006 – January 4, 2007
Leader of the Government in the House of Commons	Peter Van Loan	January 4, 2007 – October 30, 2008
Leader of the Government in the House of Commons	Jay Hill	October 30, 2008 – August 6, 2010
Leader of the Government in the House of Commons	John Baird	August 6, 2010 – May 18, 2011
Leader of the Government in the House of Commons	Peter Van Loan	May 18, 2011 – November 4, 2015
Leader of the Government in the Senate	Marjory LeBreton	February 6, 2006 – July 15, 2013
Associate Minister of National Defence	vacant	February 6, 2006 – May 18, 2011
Associate Minister of National Defence	Julian Fantino	May 18, 2011 – 4 July 2012
Associate Minister of National Defence	Bernard Valcourt	July 4, 2012 – February 22, 2013
Associate Minister of National Defence	Kerry-Lynne Findlay	February 23, 2013 – July 15, 2013
Associate Minister of National Defence	vacant	July 15, 2013 – January 5, 2015
Associate Minister of National Defence	Julian Fantino	January 5, 2015 – November 4, 2015
Minister of National Defence	Gordon O'Connor	February 6, 2006 – August 14, 2007
Minister of National Defence	Peter MacKay	August 14, 2007 – July 15, 2013
Minister of National Defence	Rob Nicholson	July 15, 2013 – February 9, 2015
Minister of National Defence	Jason Kenney	February 9, 2015 – November 4, 2015
Minister of National Revenue	Carol Skelton	February 6, 2006 – August 14, 2007
Minister of National Revenue	Gordon O'Connor	August 14, 2007 – October 30, 2008
Minister of National Revenue	Jean-Pierre Blackburn	October 30, 2008 – January 19, 2010
Minister of National Revenue	Keith Ashfield	January 19, 2010 – May 18, 2011
Minister of National Revenue	Gail Shea	May 18, 2011 – July 15, 2013
Minister of National Revenue	Kerry-Lynne Findlay	July 15, 2013 – November 4, 2015
Minister of Natural Resources	Gary Lunn	February 6, 2006 – October 30, 2008
Minister of Natural Resources	Lisa Raitt	October 30, 2008 – January 19, 2010
Minister of Natural Resources	Christian Paradis	January 19, 2010 – May 18, 2011
Minister of Natural Resources	Joe Oliver	May 18, 2011 – March 19, 2014
Minister of Natural Resources	Greg Rickford	Mar 19, 2014 – November 4, 2015
President of the Queen's Privy Council for Canada	Michael Chong	February 6, 2006 – November 26, 2006
President of the Queen's Privy Council for Canada	Peter Van Loan	November 27, 2006 – January 4, 2007
President of the Queen's Privy Council for Canada	Rona Ambrose	January 4, 2007 – October 30, 2008
President of the Queen's Privy Council for Canada	Josée Verner	October 30, 2008 – May 18, 2011
President of the Queen's Privy Council for Canada	Peter Penashue	May 18, 2011 – March 14, 2013
President of the Queen's Privy Council for Canada	Denis Lebel	March 15, 2013 – November 4, 2015
Minister of Public Safety and Emergency Preparedness	Stockwell Day	February 6, 2006 – October 30, 2008
Minister of Public Safety and Emergency Preparedness	Peter Van Loan	October 30, 2008 – January 19, 2010
Minister of Public Safety and Emergency Preparedness	Vic Toews	January 19, 2010 – July 15, 2013
Minister of Public Safety and Emergency Preparedness	Steven Blaney	July 15, 2013 – November 4, 2015
Minister of Public Works and Government Services	Michael Fortier	February 6, 2006 – June 25, 2008
Minister of Public Works and Government Services	Christian Paradis	June 25, 2008 – January 19, 2010
Minister of Public Works and Government Services	Rona Ambrose	January 19, 2010 – July 15, 2013
Minister of Public Works and Government Services	Diane Finley	July 15, 2013 – November 4, 2015
Minister of Transport	Lawrence Cannon	February 6, 2006 – October 30, 2008
Minister of Transport	John Baird	October 30, 2008 – August 6, 2010
Minister of Transport	Chuck Strahl	August 6, 2010 – May 18, 2011
Minister of Transport	Denis Lebel	May 18, 2011 – July 15, 2013
Minister of Transport	Lisa Raitt	July 15, 2013 – November 4, 2015
President of the Treasury Board	John Baird	February 6, 2006 – January 4, 2007
President of the Treasury Board	Vic Toews	January 4, 2007 – January 19, 2010
President of the Treasury Board	Stockwell Day	January 19, 2010 – May 18, 2011
President of the Treasury Board	Tony Clement	May 18, 2011 – November 4, 2015
Minister of Veterans Affairs	Greg Thompson	February 6, 2006 – January 19, 2010
Minister of Veterans Affairs	Jean-Pierre Blackburn	January 19, 2010 – May 18, 2011
Minister of Veterans Affairs	Steven Blaney	May 18, 2011 – July 15, 2013
Minister of Veterans Affairs	Julian Fantino	July 15, 2013 – January 5, 2015
Minister of Veterans Affairs	Erin O'Toole	January 5, 2015 – November 4, 2015
Minister of Western Economic Diversification	Carol Skelton	February 6, 2006 – January 4, 2007
Minister of Western Economic Diversification	Rona Ambrose	January 4, 2007 – October 30, 2008
Minister of Western Economic Diversification	Jim Prentice	October 30, 2008 – November 5, 2010
Minister of Western Economic Diversification	Rona Ambrose	November 5, 2010 – July 15, 2013
Minister of Western Economic Diversification	Michelle Rempel	July 15, 2013 – November 4, 2015

=== Earlier ministers ===
Minister	Portfolio	Tenure
Diane Ablonczy	Minister of State of Foreign Affairs (Americas and Consular Affairs); Minister of State (Seniors); Minister of State (Small Business and Tourism); Secretary of State for Small Business and Tourism	January 4, 2011 – July 14, 2013; January 19, 2010 – January 4, 2011; October 30, 2008 – January 19, 2010; August 14, 2007 – October 30, 2008
Keith Ashfield	Minister of Fisheries and Oceans; Minister for the Atlantic Gateway; Minister for the Atlantic Canada Opportunities Agency; Minister of National Revenue; Minister of State (Atlantic Canada Opportunities Agency)	May 18, 2011 – July 14, 2013; January 19, 2010 – July 14, 2013; January 19, 2010 – May 18, 2011; January 19, 2010 – May 18, 2011; October 30, 2008 – January 19, 2010
Jean-Pierre Blackburn	Minister of Veterans Affairs; Minister of State (Agriculture); Minister of National Revenue; Minister of Labour; Minister of the Economic Development Agency of Canada for the Regions of Quebec	January 19, 2010 – May 18, 2011; October 30, 2008 – May 18, 2011; October 30, 2008 – January 19, 2010; February 6, 2006 – October 30, 2008; February 6, 2006 – October 30, 2008
John Baird	Minister of Foreign Affairs; Minister of the Environment; Leader of the Government in the House of Commons; Minister of Transport, Infrastructure and Communities; Minister of the Environment; President of the Treasury Board	May 18, 2011 – February 3, 2015; November 7, 2010 – January 4, 2011; August 6, 2010 – May 18, 2011; October 30, 2008 – August 6, 2010; January 4, 2007 – October 30, 2008; February 6, 2006 – January 4, 2007
Lawrence Cannon	Minister of Foreign Affairs; Minister of State (National Capital Commission); Minister of Transport, Infrastructure and Communities	October 30, 2008 – May 18, 2011; October 30, 2008 – May 18, 2011; February 6, 2006 – October 30, 2008
Michael Chong	President of the Queen's Privy Council for Canada; Minister of Intergovernmental Affairs; Secretary of State for Sport	February 6, 2006 – November 27, 2006; February 6, 2006 – November 27, 2006; February 6, 2006 – November 27, 2006
Stockwell Day	President of the Treasury Board; Minister for the Asia–Pacific Gateway; Minister of International Trade; Minister of Public Safety	January 19, 2010 – May 18, 2011; October 30, 2008 – May 18, 2011; October 30, 2008 – January 19, 2010; February 6, 2006 – October 30, 2008
David Emerson	Minister of Foreign Affairs; Minister of International Trade; Minister for the Pacific Gateway and the Vancouver–Whistler Olympics	May 26, 2008 – October 30, 2008; February 6, 2006 – June 25, 2008; February 6, 2006 – June 25, 2008
Jim Flaherty	Minister of Finance	February 6, 2006 – March 18, 2014
Steven Fletcher	Minister of State (Democratic Reform); Minister of State (Transport)	October 30, 2008 – May 18, 2011; May 18, 2011 – July 14, 2013
Michael Fortier	Minister of Public Works and Government Services; Minister of International Trade	February 6, 2006 – June 25, 2008; June 25, 2008 – October 30, 2008
Helena Guergis	Minister of State (Status of Women); Secretary of State for Foreign Affairs and International Trade; Secretary of State for Sport	October 30, 2008 – April 9, 2010; January 4, 2007 – October 29, 2008; January 4, 2007 – October 30, 2008
Loyola Hearn	Minister of Fisheries and Oceans	February 6, 2006 – October 30, 2008
Jay Hill	Leader of the Government in the House of Commons; Chief Government Whip and Secretary of State	October 30, 2008 – August 6, 2010; January 4, 2007 – October 30, 2008
Peter Kent	Minister of State (Foreign Affairs – Americas); Minister of the Environment	October 30, 2008 – January 4, 2011; January 4, 2011 – July 14, 2013
Marjory LeBreton	Leader of the Government in the Senate	February 6, 2006 – July 14, 2013
Marjory LeBreton	Minister of State (Seniors)	October 30. 2008 – January 4, 2011
Marjory LeBreton	Secretary of State for Seniors	January 4, 2007 – October 30, 2008
Gary Lunn	Minister of State (Sports); Minister of Natural Resources	October 30, 2008 – May 18, 2011; February 6, 2006 – October 30, 2008
Ted Menzies	Minister of State (Finance)	January 4, 2011 – July 14, 2013
Rob Merrifield	Minister of State (Transport)	October 30, 2008 – May 18, 2011
Rob Moore	Minister of State (Small Business and Tourism)	January 19, 2010 – May 18, 2011
Gordon O'Connor	Chief Government Whip	October 30, 2008 – July 14, 2013
Gordon O'Connor	Minister of National Revenue	August 14, 2007 – October 30, 2008
Gordon O'Connor	Minister of National Defence	February 6, 2006 – August 14, 2007
Bev Oda	Minister of International Cooperation; Minister of Canadian Heritage; Status of Women	August 14, 2007 – July 4, 2012; February 6, 2006 – August 14, 2007; February 6, 2006 – August 14, 2007
Peter Penashue	Minister of Intergovernmental Affairs; President of the Queen's Privy Council for Canada	May 18, 2011 – March 14, 2013; May 18, 2011 – March 14, 2013
Jim Prentice	Minister of the Environment; Minister of Western Economic Diversification; Minister of Industry; Minister of Indian Affairs and Northern Development; Federal Interlocutor for Métis and Non-Status Indians	October 30, 2008 – November 4, 2010; October 30, 2008 – November 4, 2010; August 14, 2007 – October 30, 2008; February 6, 2006 – August 14, 2007; February 6, 2006 – August 14, 2007
Carol Skelton	Minister of National Revenue	February 6, 2006 – August 14, 2007
Monte Solberg	Minister of Citizenship and Immigration; Minister of Human Resources and Social Development	February 6, 2006 – January 4, 2007; January 4, 2007 – October 30, 2008
Chuck Strahl	Minister of Transport, Infrastructure and Communities; Minister of Indian Affairs and Northern Development; Federal Interlocutor for Métis and Non-Status Indians; Minister of Agriculture and Agri-Food; Minister for the Canadian Wheat Board	August 6, 2010 – May 18, 2011; August 14, 2007 – August 6, 2010; August 14, 2007 – August 6, 2010; February 6, 2006 – August 14, 2007; February 6, 2006 – August 14, 2007
Vic Toews	Minister of Public Safety and Emergency Preparedness	January 19, 2010 – July 9, 2013
Vic Toews	President of the Treasury Board	January 4, 2007 – January 19, 2010
Vic Toews	Minister of Justice and Attorney-General of Canada	February 6, 2006 – January 4, 2007
Greg Thompson	Minister of Veterans Affairs	February 6, 2006 – January 19, 2010
Josée Verner	President of the Queen's Privy Council for Canada; Minister of Intergovernmental Affairs; Minister for La Francophonie; Minister responsible for Official Languages; Minister of Canadian Heritage; Status of Women; Minister of International Cooperation; Minister for La Francophonie	October 30, 2008 – May 18, 2011; October 30, 2008 – May 18, 2011; May 26, 2008 – May 18, 2011; February 6, 2006 – October 30, 2008; August 14, 2007 – October 30, 2008; August 14, 2007 – October 30, 2008; February 6, 2006 – August 14, 2007; February 6, 2006 – August 14, 2007

== See also ==
- 2008–2009 Canadian parliamentary dispute

== Succession ==
Ministries of Canada
Preceded by 27th Canadian Ministry	28th Canadian Ministry; 2006–2015	Succeeded by 29th Canadian Ministry
