= 27th Canadian Ministry =

Government cabinet of Canada (2003–2006)

27th Canadian Ministry 27e conseil des ministres du Canada
- 27th ministry of Canada

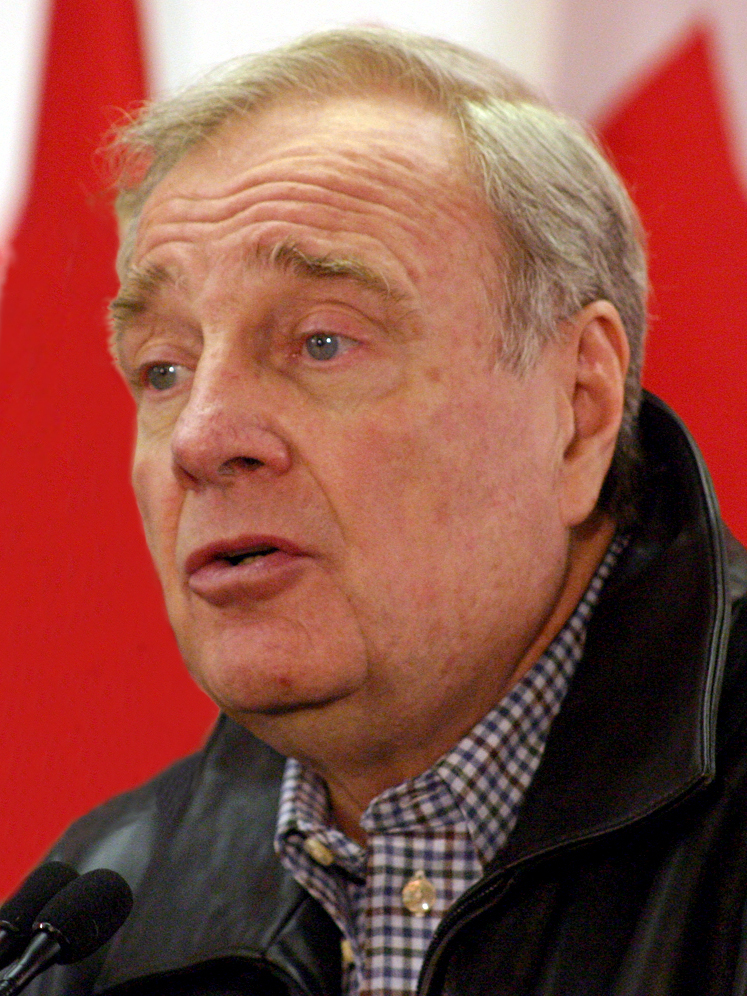
- Date formed: 12 December 2003
- Date dissolved: 6 February 2006

People and organizations
- Monarch: Elizabeth II
- Governor General: Adrienne Clarkson (2003–2005); Michaëlle Jean (2005–2006)
- Prime Minister: Paul Martin
- Prime Minister's history: Premiership of Paul Martin
- Deputy Prime Minister: Anne McLellan
- Member party: Liberal
- Status in legislature: Majority (2003–2004); Minority (2004–2006)
- Opposition party: Alliance (2003–2004); Conservative (2004–2006)
- Opposition leader: Stephen Harper (2003–2004); Grant Hill (2004); Stephen Harper (2004–2006)

History
- Election: 2004
- Legislature terms: 37th Canadian Parliament; 38th Canadian Parliament
- Budgets: 2004, 2005
- Incoming formation: 2003 Liberal leadership election
- Outgoing formation: 2006 federal election
- Predecessor: 26th Canadian Ministry
- Successor: 28th Canadian Ministry

The Twenty-Seventh Canadian Ministry was the Cabinet led by Prime Minister Paul Martin. It governed Canada from 12 December 2003 to 6 February 2006, including the last five months of the 37th Canadian Parliament and all of the 38th. The government was formed by the Liberal Party of Canada.

== List of ministers ==
=== By minister ===
Note: This is in Order of Precedence, which is established by the chronological order of appointment to the Queen's Privy Council for Canada.

Minister	Portfolio	Tenure
Paul Martin	Prime Minister	12 Dec. 2003 – 6 Feb. 2006
Anne McLellan	Deputy Prime Minister	12 Dec. 2003 – 6 Feb. 2006
Anne McLellan	Minister of Public Safety and Emergency Preparedness	4 Apr. 2004 – 6 Feb. 2006
Anne McLellan	Solicitor General of Canada	12 Dec. 2003 – 3 Apr. 2004
David Anderson	Minister of the Environment	12 Dec. 2003 – 19 Jul. 2004
Ralph Goodale	Minister of Finance	12 Dec. 2003 – 6 Feb. 2006
Raymond Chan	Minister of State (Multiculturalism and Status of Women)	20 Jul. 2004 – 6 Feb. 2006
Lucienne Robillard	Minister of Human Resources and Skills Development	14 Jan. 2005 – 16 May 2005
Lucienne Robillard	Minister of Intergovernmental Affairs	20 Jul. 2004 – 6 Feb. 2006
Lucienne Robillard	President of the Queen's Privy Council for Canada	20 Jul. 2004 – 6 Feb. 2006
Lucienne Robillard	Minister of the Economic Development Agency of Canada for the Regions of Quebec	12 Dec. 2003 – 19 Jul. 2004
Lucienne Robillard	Minister of Industry	12 Dec. 2003 – 19 Jul. 2004
Stéphane Dion	Minister of the Environment	20 Jul. 2004 – 6 Feb. 2006
Pierre Pettigrew	Minister of Foreign Affairs	20 Jul. 2004 – 6 Feb. 2006
Pierre Pettigrew	Minister of Health	12 Dec. 2003 – 19 Jul. 2004
Pierre Pettigrew	Minister of Intergovernmental Affairs	12 Dec. 2003 – 19 Jul. 2004
Pierre Pettigrew	Minister responsible for Official Languages	12 Dec. 2003 – 19 Jul. 2004
Andy Mitchell	Minister of Agriculture and Agri-Food	20 Jul. 2004 – 6 Feb. 2006
Andy Mitchell	Minister of State (Federal Economic Development Initiative for Northern Ontario)	28 Jun. 2005 – 6 Feb. 2006
Andy Mitchell	Minister of Indian Affairs and Northern Development	12 Dec. 2003 – 20 Jul. 2004
Jim Peterson	Minister of International Trade	12 Dec. 2003 – 6 Feb. 2006
Claudette Bradshaw	Minister of State (Human Resources Development)	20 Jul. 2004 – 6 Feb. 2006
Claudette Bradshaw	Minister of Labour	12 Dec. 2003 – 19 Jul. 2004
Claudette Bradshaw	Minister responsible for Homelessness	12 Dec. 2003 – 19 Jul. 2004
Bill Graham	Minister of National Defence	20 Jul. 2004 – 6 Feb. 2006
Bill Graham	Minister of Foreign Affairs	12 Dec. 2003 – 19 Jul. 2004
Joe McGuire	Minister of the Atlantic Canada Opportunities Agency	12 Dec. 2003 – 6 Feb. 2006
Bob Speller	Minister of Agriculture and Agri-Food	12 Dec. 2003 – 19 Jul. 2004
Joseph Volpe	Minister of Citizenship and Immigration	13 Jan. 2005 – 6. Feb 2006
Joseph Volpe	Minister of Human Resources and Skills Development	12 Dec. 2003 – 13 Jan. 2005
Geoff Regan	Minister of Fisheries and Oceans	12 Dec. 2003 – 6 Feb. 2006
Mauril Bélanger	Minister of Internal Trade	18 May 2005 – 6 Feb. 2006
Mauril Bélanger	Minister responsible for Democratic Reform	20 Jul. 2004 – 17 May 2005
Mauril Bélanger	Minister responsible for Official Languages	20 Jul. 2004 – 6 Feb. 2006
Mauril Bélanger	Associate Minister of National Defence	20 Jul. 2004 – 6 Feb. 2006
Mauril Bélanger	Deputy Leader of the Government in the House of Commons	12 Dec. 2003 – 6 Feb. 2006
Aileen Carroll	Minister of International Cooperation	12 Dec. 2003 – 6 Feb. 2006
Jacques Saada	Minister of the Economic Development Agency of Canada for the Regions of Quebec	12 Dec. 2003 – 6 Feb. 2006
Jacques Saada	Minister responsible for La Francophonie	20 Jul. 2004 – 6 Feb. 2006
Jacques Saada	Leader of the Government in the House of Commons	12 Dec. 2003 – 19 Jul. 2004
Jacques Saada	Minister responsible for Democratic Reform	12 Dec. 2003 – 19 Jul. 2004
Irwin Cotler	Minister of Justice and Attorney General of Canada	12 Dec. 2003 – 6 Feb. 2006
Judy Sgro	Minister of Citizenship and Immigration	12 Dec. 2003 – 13 Jan. 2005
Hélène Scherrer	Minister of Canadian Heritage	12 Dec. 2003 – 19 Jul. 2004
Liza Frulla	Minister of Canadian Heritage	20 Jul. 2004 – 6 Feb. 2006
Liza Frulla	Minister responsible for the Status of Women	20 Jul. 2004 – 6 Feb. 2006
Liza Frulla	Minister of Social Development	12 Dec. 2003 – 19 Jul. 2004
Ujjal Dosanjh	Minister of Health	20 Jul. 2004 – 6 Feb. 2006
David Emerson	Minister of Industry	20 Jul. 2004 – 6 Feb. 2006
Belinda Stronach	Minister of Human Resources and Skills Development	18 May 2005 – 6 Feb. 2006
Belinda Stronach	Minister responsible for Democratic Reform	18 May 2005 – 6 Feb. 2006

- Minister of the Atlantic Canada Opportunities Agency
  - 12 December 2003 – 6 February 2006: Joe McGuire
- Minister of Canadian Heritage
  - 12 December 2003 – 19 July 2004: Hélène Scherrer
  - 20 July 2004 – 6 February 2006: Liza Frulla
- Minister of Citizenship and Immigration
  - 12 December 2003 – 13 January 2005: Judy Sgro
  - 14 January 2005 – 6 February 2006: Joseph Volpe
- Minister of the Economic Development Agency of Canada for the Regions of Quebec
  - 20 July 2004 – 6 February 2006: Jacques Saada
- Minister of the Environment
  - 12 December 2003 – 19 July 2004: David Anderson
  - 20 July 2004 – 6 February 2006: Stéphane Dion
- Minister of Finance
  - 12 December 2003 – 6 February 2006: Ralph Goodale
- Minister of Fisheries and Oceans
  - 12 December 2003 – 6 February 2006: Geoff Regan
- Minister of Foreign Affairs
  - 12 December 2003 – 19 July 2004: Bill Graham
  - 20 July 2004 – 6 February 2006: Pierre Pettigrew
- Minister of Health
  - 12 December 2003 – 19 July 2004: Pierre Pettigrew
  - 20 July 2004 – 6 February 2006: Ujjal Dosanjh
- Minister of Human Resources and Skills Development
  - 12 December 2003 – 13 January 2005: Joseph Volpe
  - 14 January 2005 – 17 May 2005: Lucienne Robillard
  - 18 May 2005 – 6 February 2006: Belinda Stronach
- Minister of Indian Affairs and Northern Development
  - 12 December 2003 – 19 July 2004: Andy Mitchell
  - 20 July 2004 – 6 February 2006: Andy Scott
- Minister of Industry
  - 12 December 2003 – 19 July 2004: Lucienne Robillard
  - 20 July 2004 – 6 February 2006: David Emerson
- Minister of Intergovernmental Affairs
  - 12 December 2003 – 19 July 2004: Pierre Pettigrew
  - 20 July 2004 – 6 February 2006: Lucienne Robillard
- Minister of Internal Trade
  - 18 May 2005 – 6 February 2006: Mauril Bélanger
- Minister of International Cooperation
  - 12 December 2003 – 6 February 2006: Aileen Carroll
- Minister of International Trade
  - 12 December 2003 – 6 February 2006: Jim Peterson
- Minister of Justice
  - 12 December 2003 – 6 February 2006: Irwin Cotler
- Minister of Labour
  - 12 December 2003 – 19 July 2004: Claudette Bradshaw
- Minister of Labour and Housing
  - 20 July 2004 – 6 February 2006: Joe Fontana
- Minister of National Defence
  - 12 December 2003 – 19 July 2004: David Pratt
  - 20 July 2004 – 6 February 2006: Bill Graham
- Minister of National Revenue
  - 12 December 2003 – 19 July 2004: Stan Keyes
  - 20 July 2004 – 6 February 2006: John McCallum
- Minister of Natural Resources
  - 12 December 2003 – 6 February 2006: John Efford
- Minister of Public Safety and Emergency Preparedness
  - 12 December 2003 – 6 February 2006: Anne McLellan
- Minister of Public Works and Government Services
  - 12 December 2003 – 19 July 2004: Stephen Owen
  - 20 July 2004 – 6 February 2006: Scott Brison
- Minister of Social Development
  - 12 December 2003 – 19 July 2004: Liza Frulla
  - 20 July 2004 – 6 February 2006: Ken Dryden
- Minister of Transport
  - 12 December 2003 – 19 July 2004: Tony Valeri
  - 20 July 2004 – 6 February 2006: Jean Lapierre
- Minister of Veterans Affairs
  - 12 December 2003 – 19 July 2004: John McCallum
  - 20 July 2004 – 6 February 2006: Albina Guarnieri
- Minister of Western Economic Diversification
  - 12 December 2003 – 19 July 2004: Rey Pagtakhan
  - 20 July 2004 – 6 February 2006: Stephen Owen
- Minister responsible for the Canadian Wheat Board
  - 12 December 2003 – 6 February 2006: Reg Alcock
- Minister responsible for Democratic Reform
  - 12 December 2003 – 19 July 2004: Jacques Saada
  - 20 July 2004 – 17 May 2005: Mauril Bélanger
  - 18 May 2005 – 6 February 2006: Belinda Stronach
- Minister responsible for the Economic Development Agency of Canada for the Regions of Quebec
  - 12 December 2003 – 19 July 2004: Lucienne Robillard
- Minister responsible for La Francophonie
  - 12 December 2003 – 19 July 2004: Denis Coderre
  - 20 July 2004 – 6 February 2006: Jacques Saada
- Minister responsible for Homelessness
  - 12 December 2003 – 19 July 2004: Claudette Bradshaw
- Minister responsible for the Office of Indian Residential Schools Resolution
  - 12 December 2003 – 19 July 2004: Denis Coderre
- Minister responsible for Official Languages
  - 12 December 2003 – 19 July 2004: Pierre Pettigrew
  - 20 July 2004 – 6 February 2006: Mauril Bélanger
- Minister responsible for Status of Women
  - 20 July 2004 – 6 February 2006: Liza Frulla
- Minister of State (Children and Youth)
  - 12 December 2003 – 19 July 2004: Ethel Blondin-Andrew
- Minister of State (Civil Preparedness)
  - 12 December 2003 – 19 July 2004: Albina Guarnieri
- Minister of State (Families and Caregivers)
  - 20 July 2004 – 6 February 2006: Tony Ianno
- Minister of State (Federal Economic Development Initiative for Northern Ontario)
  - 12 December 2003 – 27 June 2005: Joe Comuzzi
  - 28 June 2005 – 6 February 2006: Andy Mitchell
- Minister of State (Financial Institutions)
  - 12 December 2003 – 19 July 2004: Denis Paradis
- Minister of State (Human Resources Development)
  - 20 July 2004 – 6 February 2006: Claudette Bradshaw
- Minister of State (Infrastructure)
  - 12 December 2003 – 19 July 2004: Andy Scott
- Minister of State (Infrastructure and Communities)
  - 20 July 2004 – 6 February 2006: John Godfrey
- Minister of State (Multiculturalism)
- 20 July 2004 – 6 February 2006: Raymond Chan
- Minister of State (Multiculturalism and Status of Women)
  - 12 December 2003 – 19 July 2004: Jean Augustine
- Minister of State (New and Emerging Markets)
  - 12 December 2003 – 19 July 2004: Gar Knutson
- Minister of State (Northern Development)
  - 20 July 2004 – 6 February 2006: Ethel Blondin-Andrew
- Minister of State (Public Health)
  - 12 December 2003 – 6 February 2006: Carolyn Bennett
- Minister of State (Sport)
  - 12 December 2003 – 19 July 2004: Stan Keyes
  - 20 July 2004 – 6 February 2006: Stephen Owen
- Associate Minister of National Defence
  - 12 December 2003 – 19 July 2004: Albina Guarnieri
  - 20 July 2004 – 6 February 2006: Mauril Bélanger
- Secretary of State (Science, Research and Development)
  - 12 December 2003 – 3 February 2004: Rey Pagtakhan
- President of the Queen's Privy Council for Canada
  - 12 December 2003 – 19 July 2004: Denis Coderre
  - 20 July 2004 – 6 February 2006: Lucienne Robillard
- President of the Treasury Board
  - 12 December 2003 – 6 February 2006: Reg Alcock
- Attorney General of Canada
  - 12 December 2003 – 6 February 2006: Irwin Cotler
- Federal Interlocutor for Métis and Non-Status Indians
  - 12 December 2003 – 19 July 2004: Denis Coderre
  - 20 July 2004 – 6 February 2006: Andy Scott
- Leader of the Government in the Senate
  - 12 December 2003 – 6 February 2006: Jacob Austin
- Leader of the Government in the House of Commons
  - 12 December 2003 – 19 July 2004: Jacques Saada
  - 20 July 2004 – 6 February 2006: Tony Valeri
- Deputy Leader of the Government in the House of Commons
  - 12 December 2003 – 6 February 2006: Mauril Bélanger

== Succession ==
Ministries of Canada
Preceded by 26th Canadian Ministry	27th Canadian Ministry; 2003–2006	Succeeded by 28th Canadian Ministry
