= Minister for the purposes of the Atlantic Canada Opportunities Agency Act =

Canadian cabinet position

Minister responsible for the Atlantic Canada Opportunities Agency
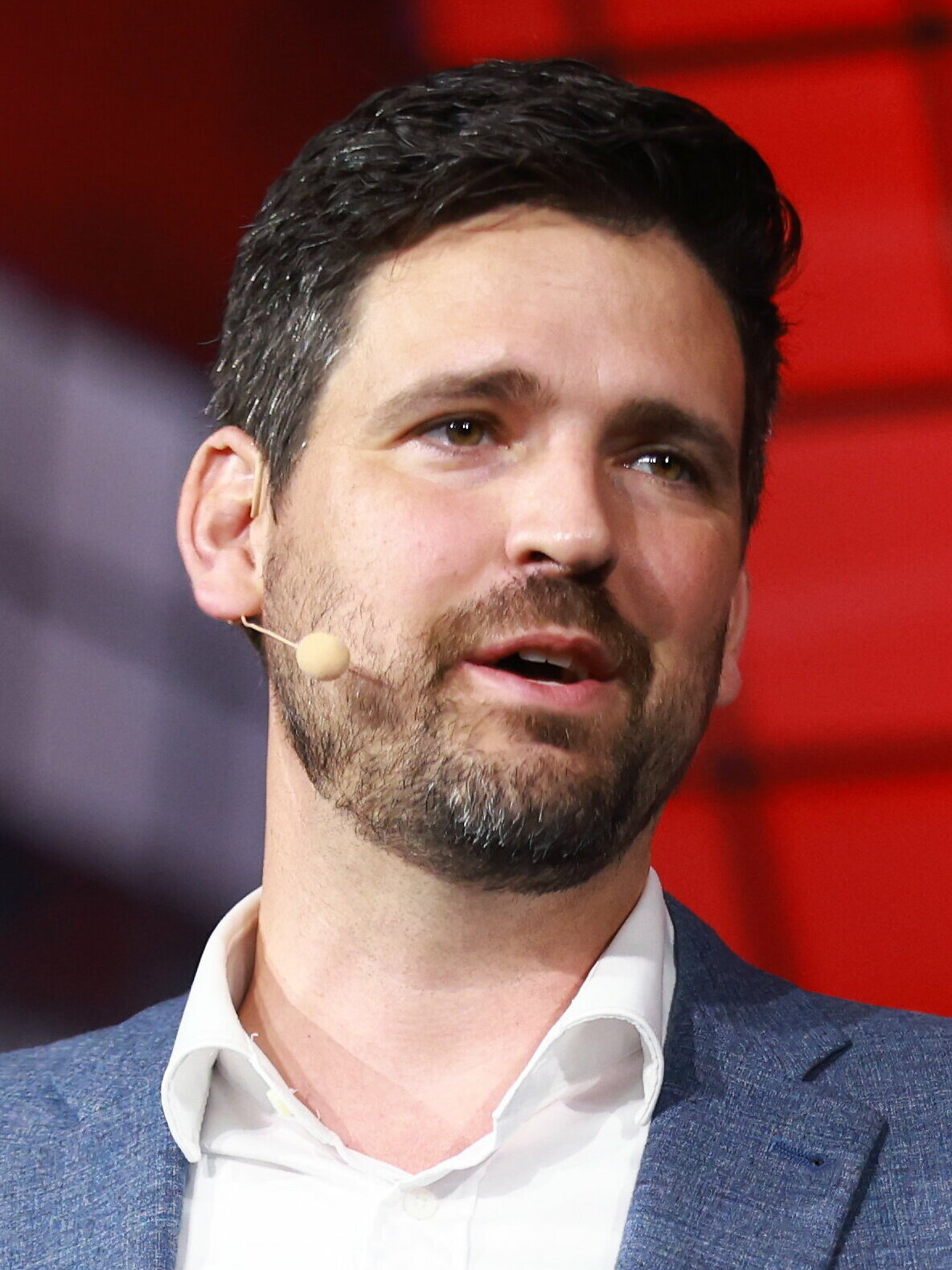
- Incumbent; Sean Fraser since May 13, 2025
- Government of Canada
- Style: The Honourable
- Member of: Cabinet; Privy Council
- Appointer: Monarch (represented by the governor general) on the advice of the prime minister
- Term length: At His Majesty's pleasure
- Inaugural holder: Gerald Merrithew
- Formation: September 15, 1988

The Minister for the purposes of the Atlantic Canada Opportunities Agency Act, more commonly the Minister for the Atlantic Canada Opportunities Agency or Minister of the Atlantic Canada Opportunities Agency (French: Ministre de l'Agence de promotion économique du Canada atlantique), is the member of the Cabinet of Canada who also serves as the chief executive of the Atlantic Canada Opportunities Agency (ACOA). The post is traditionally held by an MP from Atlantic Canada, although occasionally the responsibilities have been accorded to a more senior cabinet minister.

== Ministers ==
Key:

Liberal Party of Canada
Progressive Conservative
Conservative Party of Canada

| No. | Portrait | Name | Term of office | | Political party | Ministry |
|---|---|---|---|---|---|---|
| 1 | | Gerald Merrithew | September 15, 1988 | January 29, 1989 | Progressive Conservative | 24 (Mulroney) |
| 2 | | Elmer MacKay | January 30, 1989 | April 20, 1991 | Progressive Conservative | 24 (Mulroney) |
| 3 | | John Crosbie | April 21, 1991 | June 24, 1993 | Progressive Conservative | 24 (Mulroney) |
| 4 | | Ross Reid | June 25, 1993 | November 3, 1993 | Progressive Conservative | 25 (Campbell) |
| 5 | | David Dingwall | June 30, 1994 | January 24, 1996 | Liberal | 26 (Chrétien) |
| 6 | | John Manley | January 25, 1996 | October 16, 2000 | Liberal | 26 (Chrétien) |
| 6 | | Several secretaries of state were appointed to assist Manley in this role: Lawrence MacAulay (January 25, 1996 - June 10, 1997); Fred Mifflin (June 11, 1997 - August 2, 1999); George Baker (August 3, 1999 - October 15, 2000) | | | | 26 (Chrétien) |
| 7 | | Brian Tobin | October 17, 2000 | January 14, 2002 | Liberal | 26 (Chrétien) |
| 7 | | Several ministers of state were appointed to assist Tobin in this role: Bernie Boudreau (October 17, 2000 - January 8, 2001); Robert Thibault (January 9, 2001 - January 14, 2002) | | | | 26 (Chrétien) |
| 8 | | Allan Rock | January 15, 2002 | December 11, 2003 | Liberal | 26 (Chrétien) |
| 8 | | Gerry Byrne was appointed a minister of state to assist Rock in this role throughout his tenure | | | | 26 (Chrétien) |
| 9 | | Joe McGuire | December 12, 2003 | February 5, 2006 | Liberal | 27 (Martin) |
| 10 | | Peter MacKay | February 6, 2006 | January 19, 2010 | Conservative | 28 (Harper) |
| 10 | | Keith Ashfield was appointed a minister of state to assist MacKay in this role in this role from October 30, 2008, to January 19, 2010 | | | | 28 (Harper) |
| 11 | | Keith Ashfield | January 19, 2010 | February 22, 2013 | Conservative | 28 (Harper) |
| 11 | | Bernard Valcourt was appointed a minister of state to assist MacKay in this role in this role from May 18, 2011, to February 22, 2013. | | | | 28 (Harper) |
| 12 | | Gail Shea | February 22, 2013 | July 15, 2013 | Conservative | 28 (Harper) |
| 13 | | Bernard Valcourt | July 15, 2013 | November 4, 2015 | Conservative | 28 (Harper) |
| 13 | | Rob Moore was appointed a minister of state to assist Valcourt in this role in this role from July 15, 2013, to November 4, 2015. | | | | 28 (Harper) |
Position discontinued; responsibilities given to the Minister of Innovation, Science and Economic Development (2015 to 2019) and Minister of Economic Development and Official Languages (2019 to 2021)
| 14 | | Ginette Petitpas Taylor | October 26, 2021 | July 26, 2023 | Liberal | 29 (Trudeau) |
| 15 | | Gudie Hutchings | July 26, 2023 | March 14, 2025 | Liberal | 29 (Trudeau) |
Position discontinued; responsibilities given to the Minister of Innovation, Science and Industry
| 16 | | Sean Fraser | May 13, 2025 | Incumbent | Liberal | 30 (Carney) |
