= 1998 Canadian federal budget =

Fifth government spending plan under Paul Martin

1998 Budget of the Canadian Federal Government
- Presented: 24 February 1998
- Country: Canada
- Parliament: 36th
- Party: Liberal
- Finance minister: Paul Martin
- Total revenue: 165.520 billion
- Total expenditures: 159.741 billion
- Surplus: $5.779 billion

The Canadian federal budget for fiscal year 1998–99 was a presented by Minister of Finance Paul Martin in the House of Commons of Canada on 24 February 1998.

== Taxes ==
=== Personal income taxes ===
Despite no explicit mention in the budget itself, the Labour-sponsored venture capital corporation tax credit maximum yearly amount was increased from $525 to $750 starting in fiscal year 1998.
