= Secretary of state (Canada) =

Title given to junior ministers of state

In Canada from 1993 to 2003, from 2007 to 2008, and again since 2025, secretary of state is a title given to junior ministers of state in the Government of Canada that sit outside Cabinet. Because it is a position that is assigned to assist Cabinet ministers, a secretary of state is legally a minister of state; the distinction is that, unlike a minister, a secretary is not a full cabinet portfolio itself and thus not considered a member of Cabinet. (They are hence considered junior to ministers of state.) The Secretary of State (Training and Youth), for instance, would assist the Minister for Human Resources and Development. This usage is opposite to that in the United Kingdom, where junior ministers generally report to more senior secretaries of state. Secretaries of state are, however, members of the ministry and the King's Privy Council for Canada.

This generic usage should not be confused with the former cabinet positions of Secretary of State for Canada (1867–1996), Secretary of State for the Provinces (1867–1873), and Secretary of State for External Affairs (1909–1995).

== History ==
These positions were first used by Jean Chrétien as a way to decrease the size of the Cabinet without substantially decreasing the size of the ministry. When Paul Martin became Prime Minister in 2003, this usage ended, and he instead appointed ministers of state and increased the powers of parliamentary secretaries to act in junior policy positions.

Martin's successor, Stephen Harper, resumed the use of secretaries of state in a cabinet shuffle on 4 January 2007, but went back to ministers of state in his October 2008 cabinet.

Mark Carney resumed the use of secretaries of state in a cabinet shuffle on 13 May 2025.

== List of secretaries of state in Canada ==
=== External affairs ===
Between 1993 and 2003, there were at least three junior Minister of State positions within the Department of External Affairs (renamed in 1995 to the Department of Foreign Affairs and International Trade) responsible for assisting the Minister of Foreign Affairs (known until 1993 as the Secretary of State for External Affairs).

- the Secretary of State (Asia-Pacific) — relations within the Asia-Pacific
- the Secretary of State (Latin America and Africa) — relations with Latin America and Africa.
- the Secretary of State (Central and Eastern Europe and Middle East) — relations with Central & Eastern Europe and the Middle East (introduced by Order-in-Council in 2002).

Between 2007 and 2008, the Conservative Harper government included a less narrow position to assist with the Foreign Affairs minister, called the Secretary of State (Foreign Affairs and International Trade).

Name	Took office	Left office
Asia-Pacific
Raymond Chan	1993 November 4	2001 January 8
Rey Pagtakhan	2001 January 9	2002 January 14
David Kilgour	2002 January 15	2003 December 11
Latin America and Africa
Christine Stewart	1993 November 4	1997 June 10
David Kilgour	1997 June 11	2002 January 14
Denis Paradis	2002 January 15	2003 December 11
Central and Eastern Europe and Middle East
Gar Knutson	2002 January 15	2003 December 11
Foreign Affairs and International Trade
Helena Guergis	2007 January 4	2008 October 29
International Development
Randeep Sarai	2025 May 13	present

=== Heritage ===
Several Secretaries of State assisted the Minister of Canadian Heritage (and antecedents) with the various portfolios of the Department of Canadian Heritage (formerly Department of Communications), including multiculturalism, which at one point fell under the Minister of Multiculturalism and Citizenship.

Title and portfolio	Name	Took position	Left position	Party
Secretary of State (Multiculturalism) (Status of Women) communications, multiculturalism, status of women	Sheila Finestone	1993 November 4	1996 January 24	Liberal
Secretary of State (Multiculturalism) (Status of Women) communications, multiculturalism, status of women	Hedy Fry	1996 January 25	2002 January 27	Liberal
Secretary of State (Multiculturalism) multiculturalism	Claudette Bradshaw	2002 January 15	2002 May 25	Liberal
Secretary of State (Multiculturalism) multiculturalism	Jean Augustine	2002 May 26	2003 December 11	Liberal
Secretary of State (Multiculturalism and Canadian Identity) multiculturalism, Canadian identity	Jason Kenney	2007 January 4	2008 October 29	Conservative
Secretary of State (2010 Olympics) (Official Languages) official languages, Vancouver-Whistler Olympics,	James Moore	2008 July 25	2008 October 29	Conservative
Secretary of State (Amateur Sport) amateur sport	Denis Coderre	1999 August 3	2002 January 14	Liberal
Secretary of State (Amateur Sport) amateur sport	Paul DeVillers	2002 January 15	2003 July 16	Liberal
Secretary of State (Physical Activity and Sport) sport	Paul DeVillers	2003 July 17	2003 December 11	Liberal
Secretary of State (Sport) sport	Helena Guergis	2007 January 4	2008 October 29	Conservative
Secretary of State (Parks) National Parks	Andy Mitchell	1997 July 11	1999 August 2	Liberal
Secretary of State (Nature) National Parks, environment	Nathalie Provost	2025 May 13	present	Liberal
Secretary of State (Sport) sport	Adam van Koeverden	2025 May 13	present	Liberal

=== Industry ===
The Secretary of State (Science, Research and Development) was a position introduced in 1993 to assist the Minister of Industry within Industry Canada.

The Secretary of State (Science, Research and Development) (Western Economic Diversification) was introduced in 1996 to provide assistance to the Minister of Western Economic Diversification within their department.

Under Prime Minister Stephen Harper, the office of Secretary of State (Small Business and Tourism) was introduced. On 2008 October 30, a ministerial position was established by Harper as the Minister of State (Science & Technology).

Secretaries of State
Name	Portfolio	Took office	Left office
Jon Gerrard	Science, Research and Development	1993 November 4	1997 June 11
Jon Gerrard	Western Economic Diversification	1996 January 25	1997 June 11
Ron Duhamel	Science, Research and Development	1997 June 11	1999 August 3
Ron Duhamel	Western Economic Diversification	1997 June 11	2002 January 15
Gilbert Normand	Science, Research and Development	1999 August 3	2002 January 15
Andy Mitchell	Rural Development (Federal Economic Development Initiative for Northern Ontario)	1999 August 3	2003 December 11
Maurizio Bevilacqua	Science, Research and Development	2002 January 15	2002 May 26
Rey Pagtakhan	Science, Research and Development	2002 May 26	2003 December 11
Stephen Owen	Western Economic Diversification (including Indian Affairs and Northern Development)	2002 January 15	2003 December 11
Gerry Ritz	Secretary of State (Small Business and Tourism)	2007 January 4	2007 August 13
Diane Ablonczy	Secretary of State (Small Business and Tourism)	2007 August 14	2008 October 29
Buckley Belanger	Secretary of State (Rural Development)	2025 May 13	present
Rechie Valdez	Secretary of State (Small Business and Tourism)	2025 May 13	present

Ministers of State (Science, Research and Development)
Name	Took office	Left office
Gary Goodyear	2008 October 30	2013 July 15
Greg Rickford	2013 July 15	2014 March 19
Ed Holder	2014 March 19	2015 October 19

=== Labour ===
The Secretary of State (Training and Youth) assisted the Minister of Labour for the Department of Labour until July 1996, when the labour ministry was abolished and transferred to the Human Resources Development. In 1997, the secretarial position was changed to Secretary of State (Children and Youth).

Between 2007 and 2008 during the conservative Harper government, Human Resources Development included a Secretary of State (Seniors) to assist with the seniors portfolio.

Name	Role	Took office	Left office
Ethel Blondin-Andrew	Secretary of State (Training and Youth)	1993 November 4	1997 July 10
Ethel Blondin-Andrew	Secretary of State (Children and Youth)	1997 July 11	2003 December 11
Marjory LeBreton	Secretary of State (Seniors)	2007 January 4	2008 October 30
Anna Gainey	Secretary of State (Children and Youth)	2025 May 13	present
Stephanie McLean	Secretary of State (Seniors)	2025 May 13	present
John Zerucelli	Secretary of State (Labour)	2025 May 13	present

=== Others ===
Title	Name	Department	Portfolio	Took position	Left position
Secretary of State (Agriculture and Agri-Food, Fisheries and Oceans)	Fernand Robichaud	Agriculture and Agri-Food (formerly Agriculture); and Fisheries and Oceans	agriculture, agrifood, fisheries, oceans	1994/09/15	1997/06/10
Secretary of State (Agriculture and Agri-Food) (Fisheries and Oceans)	Gilbert Normand	Agriculture and Agri-Food (formerly Agriculture); and Fisheries and Oceans	agriculture, agrifood, fisheries, oceans	1997/06/11	1999/08/02
Secretary of State (Agriculture)	Christian Paradis	Agriculture and Agri-Food	agriculture, agrifood	2008/06/25	2008/10/29
Secretary of State (Veterans)	Lawrence MacAulay	National Defence; and Veterans Affairs	veterans, national defence	1993/11/04	1996/01/24
Secretary of State (Veterans) (Atlantic Canada Opportunities Agency)	Lawrence MacAulay	Atlantic Canada Opportunities Agency; and Veterans Affairs	veterans, national defence	1996/01/25	1997/06/10
Secretary of State (Veterans) (Atlantic Canada Opportunities Agency)	George Baker	Atlantic Canada Opportunities Agency; and Veterans Affairs	veterans, national defence	1999/08/03	2000/10/16
Secretary of State (Veterans) (Atlantic Canada Opportunities Agency)	Fred J. Mifflin	Atlantic Canada Opportunities Agency; and Veterans Affairs	veterans, national defence	1997/06/11	1999/08/02
Secretary of State (International Financial Institutions)	Douglas Peters	Finance	International financial institutions	1993/11/04	1997/06/10
Secretary of State (International Financial Institutions)	Jim Peterson	Finance	International financial institutions	1997/06/11	2002/01/14
Secretary of State (International Financial Institutions)	John McCallum	Finance	International financial institutions	2002/01/15	2002/05/25
Secretary of State (International Financial Institutions)	Maurizio Bevilacqua	Finance	International financial institutions	2002/05/26	2003/12/11
Secretary of State (Parliamentary Affairs)	Alfonso Gagliano	Government House Leader; and Solicitor General	parliamentary affairs	1994/09/15	1996/01/24
Secretary of State (Economic Development Agency of Canada for the Regions of Quebec)	Claude Drouin	Economic Development Agency of Canada for the Regions of Quebec	economic development for regions of Quebec	1999/08/03	2003/12/11
Secretary of State (Federal Office of Regional Development - Quebec)	Martin Cauchon	Federal Office of Regional Development - Quebec		1996/01/25	2002/01/14
Secretary of State (Selected Crown Corporations)	Steve Mahoney	Transportation	Crown corporations	2003/04/11	2003/12/11
Secretary of State (Asia-Pacific Gateway)	James Moore	Transportation	Asia-Pacific Gateway	2008/06/25	2008/10/29
Secretary of State (Canada Revenue Agency and financial institutions)	Wayne Long	Finance		2025/05/13	present
Secretary of State (Defence Procurement)	Stephen Fuhr	Procurement; National Defence		2025/05/13	present
Secretary of State (Combatting Crime)	Ruby Sahota	Public Safety	crime reduction	2025/05/13	present
