= Minister of Multiculturalism and Citizenship =

- Member of: House of Commons; Privy Council; Cabinet
- Reports to: Parliament; Prime Minister
- Appointer: Monarch (represented by the governor general); on the advice of the prime minister
- Precursor: Secretary of State for Canada (citizenship)
- Formation: 1991
- First holder: Gerry Weiner
- Final holder: Jason Kenney
- Abolished: 2015

The Minister of Multiculturalism and Citizenship was an office in the Cabinet of Canada from 1991 to 1996 and from 2013 to 2015. It was superseded in 1996 and again in 2015 by the Minister of Canadian Heritage. In 2019, Bardish Chagger was appointed as Minister of Diversity and Inclusion and Youth, taking on some of the responsibilities formerly associated with the position.

The responsibility of citizenship is now undertaken by the Minister of Immigration, Refugees and Citizenship. Prior to 1991, citizenship was within the portfolio of the Secretary of State for Canada.

== Ministers ==
Key:

Liberal Party of Canada
Progressive Conservative Party of Canada
Conservative Party of Canada

No.	Portrait	Name	Term of office		Political party	Ministry
1		Gerry Weiner	April 21, 1991	June 24, 1993	Progressive Conservative	24 (Mulroney)
1		Gerry Weiner	June 25, 1993	November 3, 1993	Progressive Conservative	25 (Campbell)
2		Michel Dupuy	November 4, 1993	January 24, 1996	Liberal	26 (Chrétien)
3		Sheila Copps	January 25, 1996	July 11, 1996	Liberal	26 (Chrétien)
For ministers responsible for multiculturalism between 1996-2013, see Minister of Canadian Heritage.
4		Jason Kenney	August 16, 2013	November 4, 2015	Conservative	28 (Harper)
