= Federal Interlocutor for Métis and Non-Status Indians =

Canadian cabinet position

The Federal Interlocutor for Métis and Non-Status Indians was a title and role in the Canadian Cabinet that provided a liaison (or, interlocutor) for the federal Canadian government, and its various departments, to Métis and non-status Aboriginal peoples (many of whom live in rural areas), and other off-reserve (e.g., urban) Aboriginal groups.

The role was created with the purpose of serving those Indigenous people who were excluded from the activities of Indigenous and Northern Affairs Canada, which was officially responsible only for Status Indians—largely those living on Indian reserves. In 2004, the Aboriginal Affairs Secretariat were transferred to the Department of Indian Affairs and Northern Development, which established a new sector named Office of the Federal Interlocutor (OFI), assigning it the staff, programs, and funding of the former Aboriginal Affairs Secretariat.

As of 4 September 2012, the portfolio dealing with Métis and Non-Status Indians was moved from the OFI to the Policy and Strategic Direction branch of Indigenous and Northern Affairs Canada in order to streamline program management and business processes.

== History ==
The role was created in 1985 in the context of the Aboriginal Constitutional Conferences (1983-1987) with the purpose of serving those Indigenous people who were excluded from matters of Indigenous and Northern Affairs Canada, which was officially responsible only for Status Indians—largely those living on Indian reserves. More specifically, the federal government found it necessary to designate a Minister who could act as a first point of contact to facilitate the participation of such groups in the Indigenous constitutional process. The portfolio was assigned to a senior Minister in addition to other titles and roles.

The role was kept independent from that of the Minister of Indian Affairs and Northern Development until 2004, when the office was made ex officio the Federal Interlocutor for Métis and Non-Status Indians. Over the intervening decades, the mandate evolved and broadened to include bilateral relations between the federal government and national Métis and non-status Indian organizations; tripartite self-government processes with off-reserve Aboriginal groups and the provinces; and advocacy of Métis, non-status Indian, and urban Aboriginal people issues within Cabinet and Government; among other things.

Also in 2004, along with program authorities, the Aboriginal Affairs Secretariat were transferred to the Department of Indian Affairs and Northern Development. This Department established a new sector named Office of the Federal Interlocutor (OFI), assigning it the staff, programs, and funding of the former Aboriginal Affairs Secretariat.

As of 4 September 2012, the portfolio dealing with Métis and Non-Status Indians was moved from the OFI to the Policy and Strategic Direction branch of Indigenous and Northern Affairs Canada in order to streamline program management and business processes.

== List of federal interlocutors ==
Name	Took office	Left office	Concurrent positions	Party
Anne McLellan	1994-01-19	2002-01-14	Minister of Justice and Attorney General of Canada	Lib
Ralph Goodale	2002/01/15	2002/05/25	Leader of Government in the House of Commons; Minister responsible for the Canadian Wheat Board	Lib
Denis Coderre	2003/12/12	2004/07/19	President of the Queen's Privy Council for Canada; Minister responsible for La Francophonie; Minister responsible for the Office of Indian Residential Schools Resolution	Lib
Andy Scott	2004/07/20	2006/02/05	Minister of Indian Affairs and Northern Development	Lib
Jim Prentice	2006/02/06	2007/08/13	Minister of Indian Affairs and Northern Development	Con.
Chuck Strahl	2007/08/14	2010/08/05	Minister of Indian Affairs and Northern Development; Minister of Canadian Northern Economic Development Agency	Con.
John Duncan	2010/08/06	2011/05/17	Minister of Indian Affairs and Northern Development; Minister of Canadian Northern Economic Development Agency	Con.
