= Minister of Industry (Canada) =

Canadian minister

- Ministre de l’Industrie
- Incumbent; Mélanie Joly since 13 May 2025
- Innovation, Science and Economic Development Canada
- Style: The Honourable
- Member of: House of Commons; Privy Council; Cabinet
- Reports to: Parliament; Prime minister
- Appointer: Monarch (represented by the governor general); on the advice of the prime minister
- Term length: At His Majesty's pleasure
- Inaugural holder: John Manley
- Formation: 29 March 1995
- Salary: CA$299,900 (2024)
- Website: www.ic.gc.ca

The minister of industry (French: ministre de l’Industrie) is the minister of the Crown in the Canadian Cabinet responsible for Innovation, Science and Economic Development Canada and several other agencies. The incumbent also serves as the registrar general of Canada.

Mélanie Joly has been the minister of industry since 13 May 2025.

== Portfolio organizations ==
In addition to Innovation, Science and Economic Development Canada, the minister of industry is responsible for:

- Business Development Bank of Canada (BDC)
- Canadian Intellectual Property Office (CIPO)
- Canadian Space Agency (CSA)
- Communications Research Centre Canada (CRC)
- Competition Bureau (COBU)
- Copyright Board of Canada (CB)
- Destination Canada (DC)
- Measurement Canada (MC)
- National Research Council Canada (NRC)
- Natural Sciences and Engineering Research Council of Canada (NSERC)
- Office of Consumer Affairs (OCA)
- Office of the Superintendent of Bankruptcy (OSB)
- Social Sciences and Humanities Research Council of Canada (SSHRC)
- Standards Council of Canada (SCC)
- Statistics Canada (StatCan)

== History ==
=== First century of Canada ===
The office of the registrar general of Canada has traditionally been associated with the responsibility of overseeing corporate affairs, by virtue of its function in registering all letters patent. From Confederation to 1966, the secretary of state for Canada was the registrar general. Between 1966 and 1995, the office was held by the minister of consumer and corporate affairs.

The National Research Council of Canada was established in 1916, under the pressure of World War I, to advise the government on matters of science and industrial research. In 1932, laboratories were built on Sussex Drive in Ottawa.

The economic development function of the portfolio can be traced from the office of the minister of trade and commerce, which was created in 1892. The post of minister of industry briefly existed, between 1963 and 1969, as a successor to the post of minister of defence production. It was merged with the trade and commerce portfolio in 1969. The post of minister of industry, trade and commerce existed between 1969 and 1983. During that time, separate posts of minister of regional economic expansion (1969 to 1983) and minister of regional industrial expansion (1983–1990) also existed. In 1990, the post of minister of industry, science and technology was created.

University funding was a problem for the government of Canada over the first three-quarters of the 20th century. In 1967 the passage of the Federal-Provincial Fiscal Arrangements Act (FPFAA) replaced the policy of direct federal grants to the universities with a system of transfers to the provincial governments to support the operating costs of universities, which are a provincial responsibility under the 1867 British North America Act.

Over the course of seven years, from 1970, the so-called Lamontagne Report on A Science Policy for Canada detailed the work of the Senate Special Committee on Science Policy. Several avenues were investigated by the Canadian Cabinet, including the nomination of the Royal Society of Canada as the exclusive distributor of federal "governmental science and technology contract services" funds for post-secondary education, in a "national academy of science" type arrangement but this avenue was rejected because of the provincial responsibility factor.

=== 1977 GOSA Act ===
In 1977 the funding of university research in Canada was formally separated from the NRC, under the Established Programs Financing Act and the Government Organization (Scientific Activities) Act, 1976 (GOSA Act). Several legally-distinct bodies were created to disburse federal government monies: the Social Sciences and Humanities Research Council, the Canada Council, the Natural Sciences and Engineering Research Council, the National Research Council, the Defence Research Board, the Medical Research Council (latterly renamed to the Canadian Institutes of Health Research) and the National Library of Canada each nurture the related trade. Of these bodies, the first, third, fourth, fifth and sixth report to the minister of innovation. The government provides subsidy (the major source of federal government funding to post-secondary research) and the scientists look after the details. The first, third and sixth bodies are sometimes collectively referred to as the "Tri-Council" or "Tri-Agency". The effect of the GOSA Act was dramatic, as reported by Rogers and McLean: "since 1979-80, federal support for self-initiated, non-contractual research in education has increased from C$126,000 to more than C$1.7 million" in 1986.

The present system grants directly to faculty members for research projects under such policies as the Canada Research Chair programme, and provides capital funds on a "shared-cost basis" for large infrastructure projects, such as buildings or laboratories. Fisher and Rubenson write that "both types of funding are disbursed by federal granting agencies [such as the Tri-Council bodies] on a competitive basis and awarded in accordance with federal criteria, which includes merit and national interests", observance of human rights and the general direction of state. "Furthermore, these policy decisions are set within a science and technology policy that emerged from competing definitions of science, utility, and the "public good". At the policy level, the interests of capital are privileged under the guise of serving the national interest."

From 1993 to 1995, a single minister was styled as minister of industry while concurrently holding the posts of industry, science and technology, and of consumer and corporate affairs, pending a government restructuring. The post of minister of industry was formally created in 1995 under the direction of John Manley.

=== Since 2000 ===
On 4 November 2015 the office was renamed in the 29th Canadian Ministry of Justin Trudeau. The name of the office was changed back with the swearing-in of the cabinet of Mark Carney on 13 May 2025 after the 2025 Canadian federal election.

== List of ministers ==
=== Preceding offices ===
Economic development, industry, science

- Minister of Trade and Commerce (1892–1969)
- Minister of Industry (1963–1969)
- Minister of Industry, Trade and Commerce (1969–1983)
- Minister of Regional Economic Expansion (1969–1983)
- Minister of Regional Industrial Expansion (1983–1990)
- Minister of Industry, Science and Technology (1990–1993) (legally merged in 1995)
- Minister of Science (2015-2019)

Corporate affairs

- Secretary of State for Canada (1867–1967)
- Minister of Consumer and Corporate affairs (1967–1993) (legally merged in 1995)

=== Ministers ===
Key

Liberal Party of Canada
Conservative Party of Canada
Historical conservative parties: Progressive Conservative

Minister of Industry, Science and Technology (1990–1993)
No.	Portrait	Name	Term of office		Political party	Ministry
1		Benoît Bouchard	23 February 1990	21 April 1991	Progressive; Conservative	24 (Mulroney)
2		Michael Wilson	21 April 1991	25 June 1993	Progressive; Conservative	24 (Mulroney)
Minister of Consumer and Corporate Affairs and Minister of Industry, Science and Technology (1993–1995)
No.	Portrait	Name	Term of office		Political party	Ministry
*		Jean Charest styled as minister of industry	25 June 1993	3 November 1993	Progressive; Conservative	25 (Campbell)
*		John Manley styled as minister of industry	4 November 1993	28 March 1995	Liberal	26 (Chrétien)
Minister of Industry (1995–2015)
No.	Portrait	Name	Term of office		Political party	Ministry
1		John Manley	29 March 1995	16 October 2000	Liberal	26 (Chrétien)
2		Brian Tobin	17 October 2000	14 January 2002	Liberal	26 (Chrétien)
3		Allan Rock	15 January 2002	11 December 2003	Liberal	26 (Chrétien)
4		Lucienne Robillard	12 December 2003	19 July 2004	Liberal	27 (Martin)
5		David Emerson	20 July 2004	5 February 2006	Liberal	27 (Martin)
6		Maxime Bernier	6 February 2006	13 August 2007	Conservative	28 (Harper)
7		Jim Prentice	14 August 2007	29 October 2008	Conservative	28 (Harper)
8		Tony Clement	30 October 2008	18 May 2011	Conservative	28 (Harper)
9		Christian Paradis	18 May 2011	15 July 2013	Conservative	28 (Harper)
10		James Moore	15 July 2013	4 November 2015	Conservative	28 (Harper)
Minister of Innovation, Science and Economic Development
No.	Portrait	Name	Term of office		Political party	Ministry
11		Navdeep Bains	4 November 2015	20 November 2019	Liberal	29 (J. Trudeau)
Minister of Innovation, Science and Industry
No.	Portrait	Name	Term of office		Political party	Ministry
(11)		Navdeep Bains	20 November 2019	12 January 2021	Liberal	29 (J. Trudeau)
12		François-Philippe Champagne	12 January 2021	14 March 2025	Liberal	29 (J. Trudeau)
13		Anita Anand	14 March 2025	13 May 2025	Liberal	30 (Carney)
Minister of Industry
No.	Portrait	Name	Term of office		Political party	Ministry
14		Melanie Joly	13 May 2025	Incumbent	Liberal	30 (Carney)

== Critics ==
- Scott Brison March 2008 – November 2015
