= List of Canadian federal shadow cabinets =

In the House of Commons of Canada, the non-governing political parties establish shadow cabinets, which are teams of frontbench MPs that scrutinise the policies and actions of the Cabinet of Canada.

Although shadow cabinets have existed throughout most of Canadian parliamentary history, this list of shadow cabinets begins with the shadow cabinets of the 39th Canadian Parliament, as parliamentary records and media coverage on the composition of shadow cabinets was less common prior to the 2006 Canadian federal election, making a complete list difficult to produce.

== Shadow cabinets by parliament ==
Party key
Conservative
Liberal
New Democratic
Bloc Québécois

=== 2006–present ===
Parliament	Leader of the Opposition	Official Opposition Shadow Cabinet(s)	Government	Other opposition
39th Parliament (2006–2008)	Stéphane Dion	Dion I	Harper (28th Ministry)	Duceppe V Layton III
40th Parliament (2008–2011)	Stéphane Dion	Dion II, Ignatieff I	Harper (28th Ministry)	Duceppe VI; Layton IV
40th Parliament (2008–2011)	Michael Ignatieff (Note: Interim leader of the Liberal Party from December 10, 2008 to May 2, 2009. Permanent leader from May 2, 2009 to May 25, 2011.)	Dion II, Ignatieff I	Harper (28th Ministry)	Duceppe VI; Layton IV
41st Parliament (2011–2015)	Jack Layton	Layton V, Turmel, Mulcair I	Harper (28th Ministry)	Rae, J. Trudeau; Barbot, Paillé, Bellavance, Fortin I, Beaulieu I (Note: From December 16, 2013 to June 25, 2014, the Bloc Québécois's leadership position was vacant, with André Bellavance and later Jean-François Fortin serving as parliamentary leaders.)
41st Parliament (2011–2015)	Nycole Turmel (Note: Interim leader of the New Democratic Party)	Layton V, Turmel, Mulcair I	Harper (28th Ministry)	Rae, J. Trudeau; Barbot, Paillé, Bellavance, Fortin I, Beaulieu I
41st Parliament (2011–2015)	Tom Mulcair	Layton V, Turmel, Mulcair I	Harper (28th Ministry)	Rae, J. Trudeau; Barbot, Paillé, Bellavance, Fortin I, Beaulieu I
42nd Parliament (2015–2019)	Rona Ambrose (Note: Interim leader of the Conservative Party)	Ambrose, Scheer I	J. Trudeau (29th Ministry)	Mulcair II, Singh I Fortin II, Ouellet, Beaulieu II, Blanchet I
42nd Parliament (2015–2019)	Andrew Scheer	Ambrose, Scheer I	J. Trudeau (29th Ministry)	Mulcair II, Singh I Fortin II, Ouellet, Beaulieu II, Blanchet I
43rd Parliament (2019–2021)	Andrew Scheer	Scheer II, O'Toole I	J. Trudeau (29th Ministry)	Blanchet II; Singh II
43rd Parliament (2019–2021)	Erin O'Toole	Scheer II, O'Toole I	J. Trudeau (29th Ministry)	Blanchet II; Singh II
44th Parliament (2021–2025)	Erin O'Toole	O'Toole II, Bergen, Poilievre I	J. Trudeau (29th Ministry)	Blanchet III; Singh III
44th Parliament (2021–2025)	Candice Bergen	O'Toole II, Bergen, Poilievre I	J. Trudeau (29th Ministry)	Blanchet III; Singh III
44th Parliament (2021–2025)	Pierre Poilievre	O'Toole II, Bergen, Poilievre I	J. Trudeau (29th Ministry)	Blanchet III; Singh III
44th Parliament (2021–2025)	Pierre Poilievre	O'Toole II, Bergen, Poilievre I	Carney (30th Ministry)	Blanchet III; Singh III
45th Parliament (2025–present)	Andrew Scheer (Note: From May 6, 2025 to August 18, 2025, Andrew Scheer served as leader of the Opposition due to Pierre Poilievre losing his seat in the 2025 Canadian federal election.)	Poilievre II	Carney (30th Ministry)	Blanchet IV; Davies, A. Lewis
45th Parliament (2025–present)	Pierre Poilievre	Poilievre II	Carney (30th Ministry)	Blanchet IV; Davies, A. Lewis

== Shadow cabinets by party ==
=== Bloc Québécois ===
Parliament	Shadow Cabinet	Party leader	Legislative role
39th Canadian Parliament (2006–2008)	Duceppe V	Gilles Duceppe	Third party
40th Canadian Parliament (2008–2011)	Duceppe VI	Gilles Duceppe	Third party
41st Canadian Parliament (2011–2015)	Barbot	Vivian Barbot (interim)	Fourth party
41st Canadian Parliament (2011–2015)	Paillé	Daniel Paillé	Fourth party
41st Canadian Parliament (2011–2015)	Bellavance / Fortin I	vacant	Fourth party
41st Canadian Parliament (2011–2015)	Beaulieu I	Mario Beaulieu	Fourth party
41st Canadian Parliament (2011–2015)	Duceppe VII	Gilles Duceppe	Fourth party
42nd Canadian Parliament (2015–2019)	Fortin II	Rhéal Fortin (interim)	Fourth party
42nd Canadian Parliament (2015–2019)	Oullet	Oullet	Fourth party
42nd Canadian Parliament (2015–2019)	Beaulieu II	Mario Beaulieu	Fourth party
42nd Canadian Parliament (2015–2019)	Blanchet I	Yves-François Blanchet	Fourth party
43rd Canadian Parliament (2019–2021)	Blanchet II	Yves-François Blanchet	Third party
44th Canadian Parliament (2021–2025)	Blanchet III	Yves-François Blanchet	Third party
45th Canadian Parliament (2025–present)	Blanchet IV	Yves-François Blanchet	Third party

=== Conservative Party ===
Parliament	Shadow Cabinet	Party leader	Legislative role
39th Canadian Parliament (2006–2008)	Governing party (Harper ministry)		
40th Canadian Parliament (2008–2011)	Governing party (Harper ministry)		
41st Canadian Parliament (2011–2015)	Governing party (Harper ministry)		
42nd Canadian Parliament (2015–2019)	Ambrose	Rona Ambrose (interim)	Official Opposition
42nd Canadian Parliament (2015–2019)	Scheer I	Andrew Scheer	Official Opposition
43rd Canadian Parliament (2019–2021)	Scheer II	Andrew Scheer	Official Opposition
43rd Canadian Parliament (2019–2021)	O'Toole I	Erin O'Toole	Official Opposition
44th Canadian Parliament (2021–2025)	O'Toole II	Erin O'Toole	Official Opposition
44th Canadian Parliament (2021–2025)	Bergen	Candice Bergen (interim)	Official Opposition
44th Canadian Parliament (2021–2025)	Poilievre I	Pierre Poilievre	Official Opposition
45th Canadian Parliament (2025–present)	Poilievre II	Pierre Poilievre	Official Opposition

=== Liberal Party ===
Parliament	Shadow Cabinet	Party leader	Legislative role
39th Canadian Parliament (2006–2008)	Dion I	Stéphane Dion	Official Opposition
40th Canadian Parliament (2008–2011)	Dion II	Stéphane Dion	Official Opposition
40th Canadian Parliament (2008–2011)	Ignatieff	Michael Ignatieff	Official Opposition
41st Canadian Parliament (2011–2015)	Rae	Bob Rae (interim)	Third party
41st Canadian Parliament (2011–2015)	J. Trudeau	Justin Trudeau	Third party
42nd Canadian Parliament (2015–2019)	Governing party (J. Trudeau ministry) (Carney ministry)		
43rd Canadian Parliament (2019–2021)	Governing party (J. Trudeau ministry) (Carney ministry)		
44th Canadian Parliament (2021–2025)	Governing party (J. Trudeau ministry) (Carney ministry)		
45th Canadian Parliament (2025–present)	Governing party (J. Trudeau ministry) (Carney ministry)		

=== New Democratic Party ===
Parliament	Shadow Cabinet	Party leader	Legislative role
39th Canadian Parliament (2006–2008)	Layton III	Jack Layton	Fourth party
40th Canadian Parliament (2008–2011)	Layton IV	Jack Layton	Fourth party
41st Canadian Parliament (2011–2015)	Layton V	Jack Layton	Official Opposition
41st Canadian Parliament (2011–2015)	Turmel	Nycole Turmel (interim)	Official Opposition
41st Canadian Parliament (2011–2015)	Mulcair I	Tom Mulcair	Official Opposition
42nd Canadian Parliament (2015–2019)	Mulcair II	Tom Mulcair	Third party
42nd Canadian Parliament (2015–2019)	Singh I	Jagmeet Singh	Third party
43rd Canadian Parliament (2019–2021)	Singh II	Jagmeet Singh	Fourth party
44th Canadian Parliament (2021–2025)	Singh III	Jagmeet Singh	Fourth party (Note: Confidence and supply agreement with the Liberal government from 2022 to 2024.)
45th Canadian Parliament (2025–present)	Davies	Don Davies (interim)	Fourth party
45th Canadian Parliament (2025–present)	A. Lewis	Avi Lewis	Fourth party

== See also ==
- List of Canadian ministries
- List of British shadow cabinets
