= Bloc Québécois Shadow Cabinet =

Bloc Québécois Shadow Cabinet may refer to:

- Bloc Québécois Shadow Cabinet of the 44th Parliament of Canada
- Bloc Québécois Shadow Cabinet of the 42nd Parliament of Canada
- Bloc Québécois Shadow Cabinet of the 41st Parliament of Canada
- Bloc Québécois Shadow Cabinet of the 40th Parliament of Canada
- Bloc Québécois Shadow Cabinet of the 39th Parliament of Canada

== See also ==
- Bloc Québécois
