= New Democratic Party Shadow Cabinet of the 39th Parliament of Canada =

NDP Shadow Cabinet of the 39th Canadian Parliament
- Fourth party of the House of Commons
- Date formed: September 27, 2007
- Date dissolved: September 7, 2008

People and organizations
- Party leader: Jack Layton
- Deputy party leaders: Libby Davies and Thomas Mulcair
- House Leader: Libby Davies
- Member party: New Democratic Party
- Status in legislature: Opposition 29 / 308

History
- Election: 2006
- Legislature term: 39th Parliament of Canada
- Successor: 2008–2011 NDP Shadow Cabinet

This is a list of members of the New Democratic Party Shadow Cabinet of the 39th Canadian parliament. Positions in the shadow cabinet were announced on September 27, 2007, and includes all 30 members of the New Democratic Party caucus in the House of Commons of Canada.

Portfolio	Critic	
Leader (Critic for the Prime Minister of Canada)	Hon. Jack Layton	(2004-)
Deputy Leader	Libby Davies, Thomas Mulcair	(2007-)
Critics for Ministers
Minister of Agriculture and Agri-Food	Alex Atamanenko	(2006-)
Minister for the Atlantic Canada Opportunities Agency	Yvon Godin	(2004-)
Minister of Canadian Heritage and Status of Women (Canadian Heritage)	Bill Siksay	(2007-)
Minister of Canadian Heritage and Status of Women (Status of Women)	Irene Mathyssen	(2007-)
Minister of Canadian Heritage and Status of Women (Status of Women)	Irene Mathyssen	(2006-)
Minister of Citizenship and Immigration	Olivia Chow	(2007-)
Minister of the Economic Development Agency of Canada for the Regions of Quebec	Thomas Mulcair	(2007-)
Minister of the Environment and National Parks	Nathan Cullen	(2004-)
Minister of the Environment (Deputy Critic, Great Lakes)	Joe Comartin	(2007-)
Minister of Finance	Thomas Mulcair	(2007-)
Minister of Fisheries and Oceans	Peter Stoffer	(1997-)
Minister of Fisheries and Oceans (Deputy Critic, West Coast)	Catherine Bell	(1997-)
Minister of Foreign Affairs	Paul Dewar	(2007-)
Minister of Health	Judy Wasylycia-Leis	(2007-)
Minister of Human Resources and Social Development	Tony Martin	(2004-)
Minister of Human Resources and Social Development (Employment Insurance)	Yvon Godin	(2007-)
Minister of Human Resources and Social Development (Deputy Critic, Children and Youth)	Olivia Chow	(2006-)
Minister of Human Resources and Social Development (Deputy Critic, Training)	Denise Savoie	(2007-)
Minister of Indian Affairs and Northern Development (Aboriginals)	Jean Crowder	(2006-)
Minister of Indian Affairs and Northern Development (Northern Development)	Dennis Bevington	(2006-)
Minister of Industry	Peggy Nash	(2007-)
Minister of Industry (Deputy Critic, Auto Policy)	Brian Masse	(2007-)
Minister of Industry (Deputy Critic, Shipbuilding)	Peter Stoffer	(2007-)
Minister of Industry (Deputy Critic, Steel Policy)	Wayne Marston	(2007-)
Minister of Intergovernmental Affairs	Jack Layton	(2006-)
Minister for International Cooperation	Alexa McDonough	(2006-)
Minister of International Trade and Minister for the Pacific Gateway and the Vancouver-Whistler Olympics	Peter Julian	(2004-)
Minister of Justice and Attorney General	Joe Comartin	(2004-)
Minister of Justice (Deputy Critic)	Penny Priddy	(2007-)
Minister of Justice (Deputy Critic, Human Rights)	Wayne Marston	(2007-)
Minister of Justice (Deputy Critic, Substance Abuse and Prostitution Issues)	Libby Davies	(2007-)
Minister of Labour	Libby Davies	(2007-)
Leader of the Government in the House of Commons	Libby Davies	(2003-)
Minister of National Defence	Dawn Black	(2006-)
Minister of National Revenue	David Christopherson	(2006-)
Minister of Natural Resources	Catherine Bell	(2006-)
Minister of Natural Resources (Deputy Critic, Energy)	Dennis Bevington	(2007-)
Minister of Public Safety	Penny Priddy	(2007-)
Minister of Public Safety (Deputy Critic)	Joe Comartin	(2007-)
Minister of Public Safety (Canada Border Services Agency)	Brian Masse	(2007-)
Minister of Public Works and Government Services	Charlie Angus	(2007-)
Minister of Transport, Infrastructure and Communities (Transportation)	Brian Masse	(2007-)
Minister of Transport, Infrastructure and Communities (Infrastructure & Communities)	David Christopherson	(2004-)
Minister of Transport, Infrastructure and Communities (Infrastructure & Communities, Deputy Critic, Greater Vancouver Area)	Libby Davies	(2007-)
President of the Treasury Board	Charlie Angus	(2007-)
Minister of Veterans Affairs	Peter Stoffer	(2004-)
Minister of Western Economic Diversification	Catherine J. Bell	(2006-)
Critics for Special Ministerial Responsibilities
Minister responsible for the Canadian Wheat Board	Pat Martin	(2007-)
Minister responsible for Democratic Reform	Charlie Angus	(2007-)
Minister for the Federal Economic Development Initiative for Northern Ontario	Tony Martin	(2004-)
Federal Interlocutor for Métis and Non-Status Indians	Jean Crowder	(2006-)
Minister of Intergovernmental Affairs	Jack Layton	(2007-)
Minister responsible for La Francophonie and Official Languages	Yvon Godin	(2003-)
Minister for Sport	Wayne Marston	(2006-)
Critics for Policy Areas for which there is no specific minister
Atlantic Canada Region	Alexa McDonough	(2007-)
Arctic Sovereignty	Dennis Bevington	(2007-)
Crown Corporations	David Christopherson	(2007-)
Crown Corporations (Deputy Critic, National Capital Commission)	Paul Dewar	(2007-)
Housing	Bill Siksay	(2007-)
LGBT Issues	Bill Siksay	(2006-)
Literacy	Denise Savoie	
Multiculturalism	Wayne Marston	(2006-)
Peace Advocacy	Alexa McDonough	(2007-)
Persons with Disabilities	Judy Wasylycia-Leis	(2007-)
Post-Secondary Education	Denise Savoie	2007-
Privacy and Ethics	Pat Martin	(2006-)
Public Accounts	David Christopherson	(2007-)
Rural Affairs	Alex Atamanenko	(2007-)
Seniors and Pensions	Chris Charlton	(2006-)
Toronto Issues	Peggy Nash	(2007-)
House / Caucus roles
Deputy Speaker	Bill Blaikie	
NDP House Leader	Libby Davies	
NDP Whip	Yvon Godin	
NDP Caucus Chair	Judy Wasylycia-Leis	

The NDP does not have a leader in the Senate of Canada since it opposes the existence of that body.

== See also ==
- Cabinet of Canada
- Official Opposition (Canada)
- Shadow Cabinet
- Official Opposition Shadow Cabinet (Canada)
- Bloc Québécois Shadow Cabinet
