= Official Opposition Shadow Cabinet of the 43rd Parliament of Canada =

2019–2021 opposition group

- Shadow Cabinet of Canada

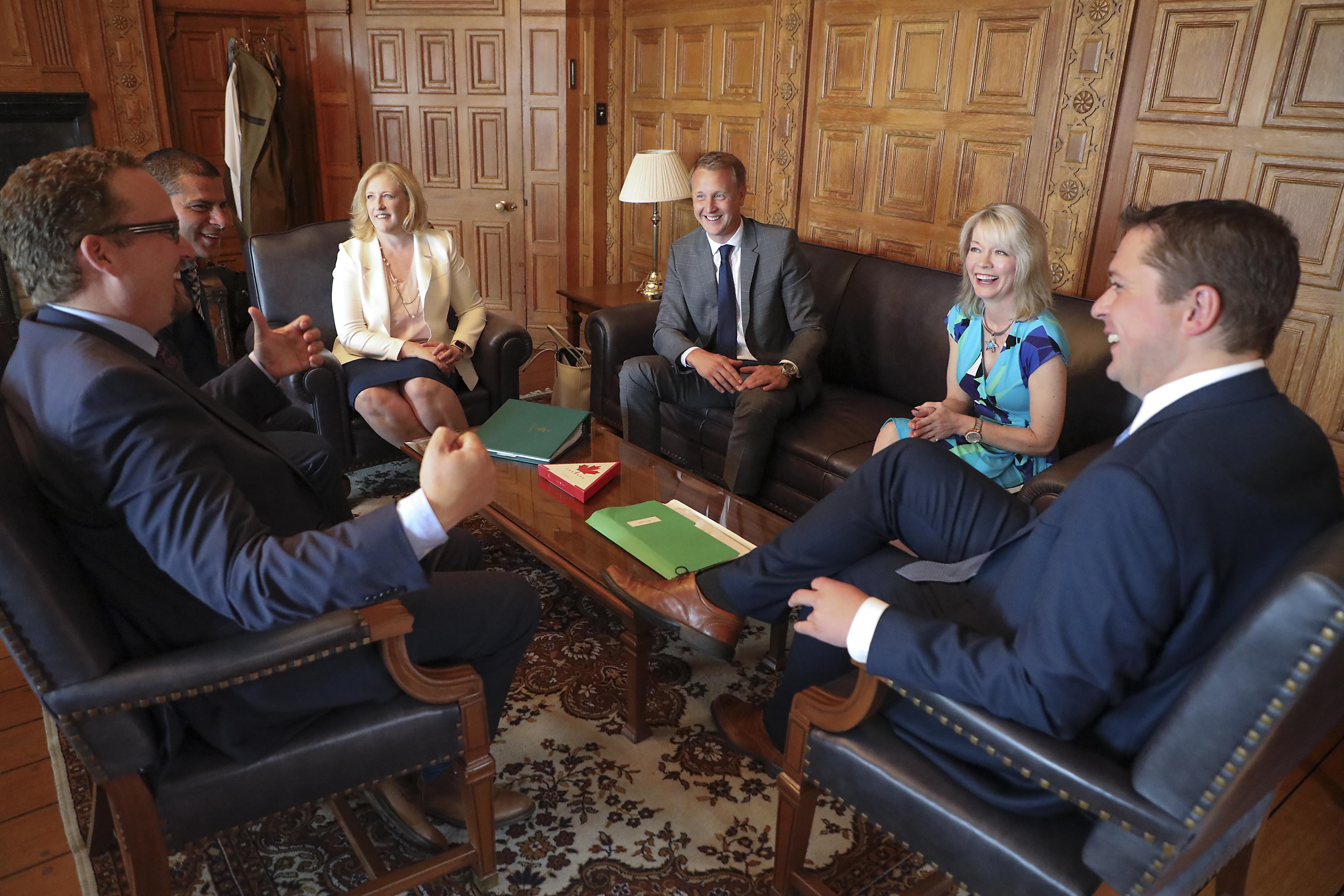
- Date formed: November 29, 2019

People and organizations
- Head of state: Queen Elizabeth II
- Opposition party: Conservative Party of Canada
- Opposition leader: Andrew Scheer (2019–2020) Erin O'Toole (2020–2021)

History
- Election: 2019
- Legislature term: 43rd Canadian Parliament
- Predecessor: 42nd (2015–2019)
- Successor: 44th (2021–2025)

The Official Opposition Shadow Cabinet in Canada was formed after the 2020 Conservative Party of Canada leadership election. Erin O'Toole appointed a Shadow cabinet in September 2020.

== By Member ==
101 MPs have served in the Official Opposition Cabinet at one point in the 43rd Parliament. 42 MPs are currently Senior Shadow Ministers shadowing a specific Minister with portfolio in the House of Commons. In addition there are 8 other Shadow Ministers with specific roles without a ministerial equivalent. Highlight indicates that a Member is a current Senior Shadow Minister. Of the senior members of Shadow Cabinet, 32 are men and 10 are women. 6 are visible minorities (14.3%). Under Andrew Scheer, most senior Shadow Ministers also had a deputy critic for their file. This has been discontinued under his successor, Erin O'Toole. Shadow ministers are often referred to as "critics".

Portrait	Shadow Minister	Portfolio	Tenure
	Ziad Aboultaif	Digital Government	November 29, 2019 — September 7, 2020
	Scott Aitchison	Deputy Tourism	November 29, 2019 — September 7, 2020
	Dan Albas	Employment, Workforce Development, and Disability Inclusion	November 29, 2019 — September 7, 2020
	Dan Albas	Environment & Climate Change	September 8, 2020 — present
	Leona Alleslev	Deputy Leader of the Official Opposition	November 29, 2019 — July 12, 2020
	Leona Alleslev	Foreign Affairs	February 1, 2020 — September 7, 2020
	Mel Arnold	Fisheries, Oceans, and the Coast Guard	November 29, 2019 — September 7, 2020
	Tony Baldinelli	Deputy Transport	November 29, 2019 — September 7, 2020
	Tony Baldinelli	Tourism	September 8, 2020 — present
	John Barlow	Agriculture and Agri-Food	November 29, 2019 — September 7, 2020
	Michael Barrett	Ethics	November 29, 2019 — present
	Luc Berthold	Infrastructure and Communities	November 29, 2019 — September 7, 2020
	Luc Berthold	Treasury Board	September 8, 2020 — present
	Bob Benzen	Deputy Digital Government	November 29, 2019 — September 7, 2020
	Candice Bergen	Opposition House Leader	November 29, 2019 — September 7, 2020
	Candice Bergen	Deputy Leader of the Official Opposition	September 8, 2020 — present
	James Bezan	National Defence	November 29, 2019 — present
	Steven Blaney	Canadian Heritage	November 29, 2019 — September 7, 2020
	Kelly Block	Public Services & Procurement	November 29, 2019 — September 7, 2020
	Richard Bragdon	Deputy Fisheries, Oceans, and the Coast Guard	November 29, 2019 — September 7, 2020
	Richard Bragdon	Deputy Atlantic Canada Opportunities Agency	November 29, 2019 — September 7, 2020
	Richard Bragdon	Fisheries, Oceans, and the Coast Guard	September 8, 2020 — present
	John Brassard	Deputy Opposition Whip	November 29, 2019 — September 7, 2020
	John Brassard	Veterans Affairs	September 8, 2020 — present
	Colin Carrie	Canada—US Relations	November 29, 2019 — September 7, 2020
	Colin Carrie	Federal Economic Development Agency for Southern Ontario	November 29, 2019 — September 7, 2020
	Kenny Chiu	Deputy International Development	November 29, 2019 — September 7, 2020
	Kenny Chiu	Diversity, Inclusion, and Youth	September 8, 2020 — present
	Michael Chong	Democratic Institutions	February 1, 2020 — September 7, 2020
	Michael Chong	Foreign Affairs	September 8, 2020 — present
	Michael Cooper	Deputy Finance	November 29, 2019 — September 7, 2020
	James Cumming	Small Business	November 29, 2019 — September 7, 2020
	James Cumming	Innovation, Science & Industry	September 8, 2020 — February 9, 2021
	James Cumming	COVID-19 Economic Recovery	February 10, 2021 — present
	Marc Dalton	Deputy Indigenous Services	November 29, 2019 — September 7, 2020
	Raquel Dancho	Diversity, Inclusion, and Youth	November 29, 2019 — September 7, 2020
	Raquel Dancho	Immigration, Refugees, and Citizenship	September 8, 2020 — February 9, 2021
	Raquel Dancho	Future Workforce Development	February 10, 2021 — present
	Raquel Dancho	Disability Inclusion	February 10, 2021 — present
	Gerard Deltell	Intergovernmental Affairs	November 29, 2019 — September 7, 2020
	Gerard Deltell	Opposition House Leader	September 8, 2020 — present
	Todd Doherty	Transport	November 29, 2019 — September 7, 2020
	Todd Doherty	Mental Health & Wellness	September 8, 2020 — present
	Terry Dowdall	Deputy Small Business	November 29, 2019 — September 7, 2020
	Earl Dreeshen	Deputy Innovation, Science, and Industry	November 29, 2019 — September 7, 2020
	Earl Dreeshen	Deputy Economic Development	November 29, 2019 — September 7, 2020
	Eric Duncan	Deputy Democratic Institutions	February 1, 2020 — September 7, 2020
	Eric Duncan	Question Period Coordinator	September 8, 2020 — present
	Chris d'Entremont	Official Languages	November 29, 2019 — September 7, 2020
	Chris d'Entremont	Atlantic Canada Opportunities Agency	November 29, 2019 — present
	Chris d'Entremont	Intergovernmental Affairs	September 8, 2020 — present
	Dave Epp	Deputy Foreign Affairs	November 29, 2019 — September 7, 2020
	Rosemarie Falk	Deputy Families, Children, and Social Development	November 29, 2019 — September 7, 2020
	Rosemarie Falk	Seniors	September 8, 2020 — present
	Ed Fast	Finance	February 10, 2021 — present
	Kerry-Lynne Findlay	Environment & Climate Change	November 29, 2019 — September 7, 2020
	Cheryl Gallant	Federal Economic Development Initiative for Northern Ontario	November 29, 2019 — September 7, 2020
	Cheryl Gallant	Associate Veterans Affairs	November 29, 2019 — September 7, 2020
	Bernard Généreux	Rural Economic Development	November 29, 2019 — September 7, 2020
	Bernard Généreux	Quebec Economic Development Agency	November 29, 2019 — September 7, 2020
	Garnett Genuis	Multiculturalism	November 29, 2019 — September 7, 2020
	Garnett Genuis	Canada—China Relations	February 1, 2020 — September 7, 2020
	Garnett Genuis	International Development	September 8, 2020 — present
	Garnett Genuis	Human Rights and Religious Freedom	September 8, 2020 — present
	Marilyn Gladu	Health	November 29, 2019 — January 31, 2020
	Marilyn Gladu	Queen's Privy Council of Canada	September 8, 2020 — present
	Marilyn Gladu	Federal Economic Development Agency for Southern Ontario	September 8, 2020 — present
	Joël Godin	Deputy Official Languages	November 29, 2019 — September 7, 2020
	Tracy Gray	Interprovincial Trade	November 29, 2019 — September 7, 2020
	Tracy Gray	Export Promotion and International Trade	September 8, 2020 — present
	Jasraj Hallan	Deputy Multiculturalism	November 29, 2019 — September 7, 2020
	Jasraj Hallan	Immigration, Refugees & Citizenship	February 10, 2021 — present
	Rachael Harder	Digital Government	February 10, 2021 — present
	Randy Hoback	Export Promotion & International Trade	November 29, 2019 — September 7, 2020
	Tamara Jansen	Deputy Labour	November 29, 2019 — September 7, 2020
	Matt Jeneroux	Associate Infrastructure and Communities	November 29, 2019 — December 31, 2020
	Matt Jeneroux	Health	February 1, 2020 — September 7, 2020
	Pat Kelly	Associate Finance	November 29, 2019 — September 7, 2020
	Pat Kelly	Small Business	September 8, 2020 — present
	Pat Kelly	Western Economic Diversification	September 8, 2020 — present
	Peter Kent	Immigration, Refugees, and Citizenship	November 29, 2019 — September 7, 2020
	Peter Kent	Employment, Workforce Development and Disability Inclusion	September 8, 2020 — February 9, 2021
	Robert Kitchen	Deputy Health	November 29, 2019 — September 7, 2020
	Michael Kram	Deputy Export Promotion & International Trade	November 29, 2019 — September 7, 2020
	Damien Kurek	Deputy Rural Economic Development	November 29, 2019 — September 7, 2020
	Stephanie Kusie	Families, Children, and Social Development	November 29, 2019 — September 7, 2020
	Stephanie Kusie	Transport	September 8, 2020 — present
	Mike Lake	International Development	November 29, 2019 — September 7, 2020
	Philip Lawrence	Deputy Justice	February 1, 2020 — September 7, 2020
	Philip Lawrence	National Revenue	September 8, 2020 — present
	Richard Lehoux	Associate Agriculture and Agri-Food	November 29, 2019 — September 7, 2020
	Richard Lehoux	Rural Economic Development (co-Critic)	February 10, 2021 — present
	Chris Lewis	Deputy Canada—US Relations	November 29, 2019 — September 7, 2020
	Chris Lewis	Deputy Federal Economic Development Agency for Southern Ontario	November 29, 2019 — September 7, 2020
	Dane Lloyd	Digital Government	September 8, 2020 — February 9, 2021
	Dane Lloyd	Rural Economic Development (co-Critic)	February 10, 2021 — present
	Richard Martel	Deputy National Defence	November 29, 2019 — September 7, 2020
	Richard Martel	Quebec Lieutenant	September 8, 2020 — present
	Dan Mazier	Deputy Environment & Climate Change	November 29, 2019 — September 7, 2020
	Kelly McCauley	Deputy Public Services & Procurement	November 29, 2019 — September 7, 2020
	Phil McColeman	Veterans Affairs	November 29, 2019 — September 7, 2020
	Greg McLean	Deputy National Revenue	November 29, 2019 — September 7, 2020
	Greg McLean	Natural Resources	September 8, 2020 — present
	Greg McLean	Canadian Northern Economic Development Agency	September 8, 2020 — present
	Cathy McLeod	Forestry and Mining	February 1, 2020 — September 7, 2020
	Cathy McLeod	Crown-Indigenous Relations	September 8, 2020 — February 9, 2021
	Eric Melillo	Deputy Diversity, Inclusion, and Youth	November 29, 2019 — September 7, 2020
	Eric Melillo	Deputy Federal Economic Development Initiative for Northern Ontario	November 29, 2019 — September 7, 2020
	Eric Melillo	Northern Affairs	September 8, 2020 — present
	Eric Melillo	Federal Economic Development Initiative for Northern Ontario	September 8, 2020 — present
	Rob Moore	Justice	November 29, 2019 — present
	Marty Morantz	National Revenue	November 29, 2019 — September 7, 2020
	Rob Morrison	Deputy Public Safety & Emergency Preparedness	November 29, 2019 — September 7, 2020
	Glen Motz	Associate Public Safety & Emergency Preparedness	November 29, 2019 — September 7, 2020
	John Nater	Deputy Opposition House Leader	November 29, 2019 — September 7, 2020
	John Nater	Question Period Coordinator	November 29, 2019 — September 7, 2020
	John Nater	Rural Economic Development	September 8, 2020 — February 9, 2021
	John Nater	Middle Class Prosperity	February 10, 2021 — present
	Erin O'Toole	Foreign Affairs	November 29, 2019 — January 31, 2020
	Erin O'Toole	Leader of the Opposition	August 24, 2020 — present
	Erin O'Toole	Middle Class Prosperity	September 8, 2020 — present
	Jeremy Patzer	Deputy Natural Resources	November 29, 2019 — September 7, 2020
	Pierre Paul-Hus	Public Safety & Emergency Preparedness	November 29, 2019 — September 7, 2020
	Pierre Paul-Hus	Public Services & Procurement	September 8, 2020 — present
	Pierre Poilievre	Finance	November 29, 2019 — February 9, 2021
	Pierre Poilievre	Jobs and Industry	February 10, 2021 — September 10, 2022
Leader of the Official Opposition	September 10, 2022 – present		
	Alain Rayes	Quebec Lieutenant	November 29, 2019 — September 7, 2020
	Alain Rayes	Canadian Heritage	September 8, 2020 — present
	Alain Rayes	Official Languages	September 8, 2020 — present
	Alain Rayes	Quebec Economic Development Agency	September 8, 2020 — present
	Michelle Rempel Garner	Innovation, Science and Industry	November 29, 2019 — September 7, 2020
	Michelle Rempel Garner	Economic Development	November 29, 2019 — September 7, 2020
	Michelle Rempel Garner	Health	September 8, 2020 — present
	Blake Richards	Tourism	November 29, 2019 — September 7, 2020
	Blake Richards	Western Economic Development	November 29, 2019 — September 7, 2020
	Blake Richards	Opposition Whip	September 8, 2020 — present
	Lianne Rood	Deputy Agriculture and Agri-Food	November 29, 2019 — September 7, 2020
	Lianne Rood	Agriculture and Agri-Food	September 8, 2020 — present
	Alex Ruff	Deputy Whip	September 8, 2020 — present
	Jag Sahota	Deputy Women and Gender Equality	November 29, 2019 — September 7, 2020
	Jag Sahota	Women and Gender Equality	September 8, 2020 — present
	Bob Saroya	Queen's Privy Council for Canada	November 29, 2019 — September 7, 2020
	Kyle Seeback	Deputy Immigration, Refugees and Citizenship	November 29, 2019 — September 7, 2020
	Andrew Scheer	Leader of the Official Opposition	November 29, 2019 — August 23, 2020
	Andrew Scheer	Infrastructure and Communities	September 8, 2020 — present
	Jamie Schmale	Crown-Indigenous Relations	November 29, 2019 — September 7, 2020
	Jamie Schmale	Families, Children, and Social Development	September 8, 2020 — February 9, 2021
	Jamie Schmale	Crown-Indigenous Relations	February 10, 2021 — present
	Martin Shields	Deputy Seniors	November 29, 2019 — September 7, 2020
	Nelly Shin	Deputy Canadian Heritage	November 29, 2019 — September 7, 2020
	Doug Shipley	Deputy Infrastructure and Communities	November 29, 2019 — September 7, 2020
	Derek Sloan	Deputy Justice	November 29, 2019 — January 31, 2020
	Gerald Soroka	Deputy Forestry and Mining	November 29, 2019 — September 7, 2020
	Warren Steinley	Deputy Treasury Board	November 29, 2019 — September 7, 2020
	Warren Steinley	Economic Development	September 8, 2020 — present
	Warren Steinley	Interprovincial Trade	September 8, 2020 — present
	Mark Strahl	Opposition Whip	November 29, 2019 — September 7, 2020
	Mark Strahl	Labour	September 8, 2020 — present
	Shannon Stubbs	Natural Resources	November 29, 2019 — September 7, 2020
	Shannon Stubbs	Public Safety & Emergency Preparedness	September 8, 2020 — present
	David Sweet	Human Rights and Religious Freedom	November 29, 2019 — September 7, 2020
	Corey Tochor	Deputy Intergovernmental Affairs	November 29, 2019 — September 7, 2020
	Corey Tochor	Families, Children & Social Development	February 10, 2021 — present
	Tim Uppal	Treasury Board	November 29, 2019 — September 7, 2020
	Tim Uppal	Caucus-Party Liaison	September 8, 2020 — present
	Karen Vecchio	Women and Gender Equality	November 29, 2019 — September 7, 2020
	Karen Vecchio	Deputy House Leader	September 8, 2020 — present
	Gary Vidal	Indigenous Services	November 29, 2019 — present
	Arnold Viersen	Deputy Crown-Indigenous Relations	November 29, 2019 — September 7, 2020
	Brad Vis	Deputy Employment, Workforce Development, and Disability Inclusion	November 29, 2019 — September 7, 2020
	Brad Vis	Housing	September 8, 2020 — present
	Cathay Wagantall	Deputy Veterans Affairs	November 29, 2019 — September 7, 2020
	John Williamson	Labour	November 29, 2019 — September 7, 2020
	Alice Wong	Seniors	November 29, 2019 — September 7, 2020
	David Yurdiga	Deputy Northern Affairs	November 29, 2019 — September 7, 2020
	David Yurdiga	Deputy Canadian Northern Economic Development Agency	November 29, 2019 — September 7, 2020
	Bob Zimmer	Northern Affairs	November 29, 2019 — September 7, 2020
	Bob Zimmer	Canadian Northern Economic Development Agency	November 29, 2019 — September 7, 2020

== By Shadow Cabinet ==
Following the 2019 federal election, held on October 21, 2019, the Conservative Party gained seats, but remained as the Official Opposition, while the governing Liberals formed a minority government. It is led by Erin O'Toole, who was elected as party leader on August 24, 2020. Prior to that, it was led by Andrew Scheer, who was elected as party leader in May 2017.

=== Erin O'Toole ===
==== O'Toole II (February 10, 2021 – February 2, 2022) ====
Portfolio	Critic	Deputy
Caucus Officers
Leader of the Opposition; Conservative Party Leader	Hon. Erin O'Toole	Hon. Candice Bergen
Opposition Senate Leader	Hon. Don Plett	Hon. Yonah Martin
Opposition Senate Whip	Hon. Judith Seidman	Hon. Leo Housakos
Opposition House Leader	Gérard Deltell	Karen Vecchio
Opposition Whip	Blake Richards	Alex Ruff
Party-Caucus Liaison	Hon. Tim Uppal	None
Question Period Coordinator	Eric Duncan	None
National Caucus Chair	Tom Kmiec (H); Rose-May Poirier (S)	None
Senior Parliamentary Critics
Agriculture & Agri-Food	Lianne Rood	None
Canadian Heritage & Official Languages	Alain Rayes	None
Crown-Indigenous Relations	Jamie Schmale	None
Digital Government	Rachael Harder	None
Diversity, Inclusion & Youth	Kenny Chiu	None
Economic Development & Internal Trade	Warren Steinley	None
Environment & Climate Change	Dan Albas	None
Export Promotion & International Trade	Tracy Gray	None
Families, Children & Social Development	Corey Tochor	None
Finance	Hon. Ed Fast	None
Fisheries, Oceans & Coast Guard	Richard Bragdon	None
Foreign Affairs	Hon. Michael Chong	None
Health	Hon. Michelle Rempel Garner	None
Immigration, Refugees & Citizenship	Jasraj Hallan	None
Indigenous Services	Gary Vidal	None
Infrastructure & Communities	Hon. Andrew Scheer	None
Intergovernmental Affairs	Chris d'Entremont	None
International Development	Garnett Genuis	None
Jobs and Industry	Hon. Pierre Poilievre	None
Justice	Hon. Rob Moore	None
Labour	Mark Strahl	None
Middle Class Prosperity	John Nater	None
National Defence	James Bezan	None
Natural Resources	Greg McLean	None
National Revenue	Philip Lawrence	None
Northern Affairs	Eric Melillo	None
Queen's Privy Council	Marilyn Gladu	None
Public Safety & Emergency Preparedness	Shannon Stubbs	None
Public Services & Procurement	Pierre Paul-Hus	None
Rural Economic Development	Richard Lehoux (Co-Critic); Dane Lloyd (Co-Critic)	None
Seniors	Rosemarie Falk	None
Small Business	Pat Kelly	None
Transport	Stephanie Kusie	None
Treasury Board	Luc Berthold	None
Veterans Affairs	John Brassard	None
Women and Gender Equality	Jag Sahota	None
Other Parliamentary Critics
COVID-19 Economic Recovery	James Cumming	None
Economic Development (Atlantic)	Chris d'Entremont	None
Economic Development (N. Ontario)	Eric Melillo	None
Economic Development (S. Ontario)	Marilyn Gladu	None
Economic Development (Quebec)	Alain Rayes	None
Economic Development (The North)	Greg McLean	None
Economic Development (The West)	Pat Kelly	None
Ethics	Michael Barrett	None
Future Workforce Development & Disability Inclusion	Raquel Dancho	None
Housing	Brad Vis	None
Mental Health and Wellness	Todd Doherty	None
Tourism	Tony Baldinelli	None

==== O'Toole I (September 2, 2020 – February 9, 2021) ====
Portfolio	Critic	Deputy
Caucus Officers
Leader of the Opposition; Conservative Party Leader	Hon. Erin O'Toole	Hon. Candice Bergen
Opposition Senate Leader	Hon. Don Plett	Hon. Yonah Martin
Opposition Senate Whip	Hon. Judith Seidman	Hon. Leo Housakos
Opposition House Leader	Gérard Deltell	Karen Vecchio
Opposition Whip	Blake Richards	Alex Ruff
Party-Caucus Liaison	Hon. Tim Uppal	None
Question Period Coordinator	Eric Duncan	None
National Caucus Chair	Tom Kmiec (H); Rose-May Poirier (S)	None
Senior Parliamentary Critics
Agriculture & Agri-Food	Lianne Rood	None
Canadian Heritage & Official Languages	Alain Rayes	None
Crown-Indigenous Relations	Cathy McLeod	None
Digital Government	Dane Lloyd	None
Diversity, Inclusion & Youth	Kenny Chiu	None
Economic Development & Internal Trade	Warren Steinley	None
Employment, Workforce Development & Disability Inclusion	Hon. Peter Kent	None
Environment & Climate Change	Dan Albas	None
Export Promotion & International Trade	Tracy Gray	None
Families, Children & Social Development	Jamie Schmale	None
Finance	Hon. Pierre Poilievre	None
Fisheries, Oceans & Coast Guard	Richard Bragdon	None
Foreign Affairs	Hon. Michael Chong	None
Health	Hon. Michelle Rempel Garner	None
Immigration, Refugees & Citizenship	Raquel Dancho	None
Indigenous Services	Gary Vidal	None
Infrastructure & Communities	Hon. Andrew Scheer	None
Innovation, Science & Industry	James Cumming	None
Intergovernmental Affairs	Chris d'Entremont	None
International Development	Garnett Genuis	None
Justice	Hon. Rob Moore	None
Labour	Mark Strahl	None
Middle Class Prosperity	Hon. Erin O'Toole	None
National Defence	James Bezan	None
Natural Resources	Greg McLean	None
National Revenue	Philip Lawrence	None
Northern Affairs	Eric Melillo	None
Queen's Privy Council	Marilyn Gladu	None
Public Safety & Emergency Preparedness	Shannon Stubbs	None
Public Services & Procurement	Pierre Paul-Hus	None
Rural Economic Development	John Nater	None
Seniors	Rosemarie Falk	None
Small Business	Pat Kelly	None
Transport	Stephanie Kusie	None
Treasury Board	Luc Berthold	None
Veterans Affairs	John Brassard	None
Women and Gender Equality	Jag Sahota	None
Other Parliamentary Critics
Economic Development (Atlantic)	Chris d'Entremont	None
Economic Development (N. Ontario)	Eric Melillo	None
Economic Development (S. Ontario)	Marilyn Gladu	None
Economic Development (Quebec)	Alain Rayes	None
Economic Development (The North)	Greg McLean	None
Economic Development (The West)	Pat Kelly	None
Ethics	Michael Barrett	None
Housing	Brad Vis	None
Mental Health and Wellness	Todd Doherty	None
Tourism	Tony Baldinelli	None

=== Andrew Scheer ===
==== Scheer VIII (February 1, 2020 – August 23, 2020) ====
Scheer made changes to his Shadow Cabinet as a result of various members of his caucus announcing their candidacy for the party's leadership. Under caucus rules, MPs running for party leadership had to resign their critic positions.

Portfolio	Critic	Deputy
Caucus Leadership
Leader of the Opposition; CPC Leader	Hon. Andrew Scheer	Leona Alleslev
Opposition Senate Leader	Hon. Don Plett	Hon. Yonah Martin
Opposition Senate Whip	Hon. Judith Seidman	TBD
Opposition House Leader	Hon. Candice Bergen	John Nater
Opposition Whip	Mark Strahl	John Brassard
Caucus Chair	Tom Kmiec (H); TBD (S)	None
Senior Parliamentary Critics
Agriculture and Agri-Food	John Barlow	Richard Lehoux; Lianne Rood
Canadian Heritage	Hon. Steven Blaney	Nelly Shin
Digital Government	Ziad Aboultaif	Bob Benzen
Diversity, Inclusion and Youth	Raquel Dancho	Eric Melillo
Economic Development and Official Languages	Hon. Michelle Rempel (ED); Chris d'Entremont (OL)	Earl Dreeshen (ED); Joel Godin (OL)
Employment and Workforce Development	Dan Albas	Brad Vis
Environment and Climate Change	Hon. Kerry-Lynne Findlay	Dan Mazier
Families, Children, and Social Development	Stephanie Kusie	Rosemarie Falk
Fisheries and Oceans	Mel Arnold	Richard Bragdon
Finance	Hon. Pierre Poilievre	Pat Kelly; Michael Cooper
Foreign Affairs	Leona Alleslev	Dave Epp
Health	Matt Jeneroux	Robert Kitchen
Immigration, Refugees and Citizenship	Hon. Peter Kent	Kyle Seeback
Indigenous Relations	Jamie Schmale	Arnold Viersen
Indigenous Services	Gary Vidal	Marc Dalton
Infrastructure and Communities	Luc Berthold	Doug Shipley
Innovation, Science, and Industry	Hon. Michelle Rempel	Earl Dreeshen
Intergovernmental Affairs	Gerard Deltell	Corey Tochor
International Development	Hon. Mike Lake	Kenny Chiu
International Trade	Randy Hoback	Michael Kram
Justice	Hon. Rob Moore	None
Labour	John Williamson	Tamara Jansen
National Defence	James Bezan	Richard Martel
National Revenue	Marty Morantz	Greg McLean
Natural Resources	Shannon Stubbs	Jeremy Patzer
Northern Affairs	Bob Zimmer	David Yurdiga
Public Safety and Emergency Preparedness	Pierre Paul-Hus	Glen Motz; Rob Morrison
Public Services and Procurement	Kelly Block	Kelly McCauley
Queen's Privy Council for Canada	Bob Saroya	None
Rural Economic Development	Bernard Genereux	Damien Kurek
Seniors	Hon. Alice Wong	Martin Shields
Small Business and Export Promotion	James Cumming	Terry Dowdall
Transport	Todd Doherty	Tony Baldinelli
Treasury Board	Hon. Tim Uppal	Warren Steinley
Veterans Affairs	Phil McColeman	Cheryl Gallant; Cathay Wagantall
Women and Gender Equality	Karen Vecchio	Jag Sahota
Other Parliamentary Critics
Canada-China Relations	Garnett Genuis	None
Canada-US Relations	Colin Carrie	Chris Lewis
Democratic Institutions	Hon. Michael Chong	Eric Duncan
Economic Development (Atlantic Canada)	Chris d'Entremont	Richard Bragdon
Economic Development (Northern Ontario)	Cheryl Gallant	Eric Melillo
Economic Development (Quebec)	Bernard Genereux	None
Economic Development (Southern Ontario)	Colin Carrie	Chris Lewis
Economic Development (The North)	Bob Zimmer	David Yurdiga
Economic Development (Western Canada)	Blake Richards	None
Ethics	Michael Barrett	None
Forestry & Mining	Cathy McLeod	Gerald Soroka
Human Rights & Religious Freedom	David Sweet	None
Interprovincial Trade	Tracy Gray	None
Multiculturalism	Garnett Genuis	Jasraj Hallan
Tourism	Blake Richards	Scott Aitchison

==== Scheer VII (November 29, 2019 – January 31, 2020) ====
Portfolio	Critic	Deputy
Caucus Leadership
Leader of the Opposition; CPC Leader	Hon. Andrew Scheer	Leona Alleslev
Opposition Senate Leader	Hon. Don Plett	Hon. Yonah Martin
Opposition Senate Whip	TBD	TBD
Opposition House Leader	Hon. Candice Bergen	John Nater
Opposition Whip	Mark Strahl	John Brassard
Caucus Chair	Tom Kmiec (H); TBD (S)	None
Senior Parliamentary Critics
Agriculture and Agri-Food	John Barlow	Richard Lehoux; Lianne Rood
Canadian Heritage	Hon. Steven Blaney	Nelly Shin
Digital Government	Ziad Aboultaif	Bob Benzen
Diversity, Inclusion and Youth	Raquel Dancho	Eric Melillo
Economic Development and Official Languages	Hon. Michelle Rempel (ED); Chris d'Entremont (OL)	Earl Dreeshen (ED); Joel Godin (OL)
Employment and Workforce Development	Dan Albas	Brad Vis
Environment and Climate Change	Hon. Kerry-Lynne Findlay	Dan Mazier
Families, Children, and Social Development	Stephanie Kusie	Rosemarie Falk
Fisheries and Oceans	Mel Arnold	Richard Bragdon
Finance	Hon. Pierre Poilievre	Pat Kelly; Michael Cooper
Foreign Affairs	Erin O'Toole	David Epp
Health	Marilyn Gladu	Robert Kitchen
Immigration, Refugees and Citizenship	Hon. Peter Kent	Kyle Seeback
Indigenous Relations	Jamie Schmale	Arnold Viersen
Indigenous Services	Gary Vidal	Marc Dalton
Infrastructure and Communities	Luc Berthold	Matt Jeneroux; Doug Shipley
Innovation, Science, and Industry	Hon. Michelle Rempel	Earl Dreeshen
Intergovernmental Affairs	Gerard Deltell	Corey Tochor
International Development	Hon. Mike Lake	Kenny Chiu
International Trade	Randy Hoback	Michael Kram
Justice	Hon. Rob Moore	Derek Sloan
Labour	John Williamson	Tamara Jansen
National Defence	James Bezan	Richard Martel
National Revenue	Marty Morantz	Greg McLean
Natural Resources	Shannon Stubbs	Jeremy Patzer
Northern Affairs	Bob Zimmer	David Yurdiga
Public Safety and Emergency Preparedness	Pierre Paul-Hus	Glen Motz; Rob Morrison
Public Services and Procurement	Kelly Block	Kelly McCauley
Queen's Privy Council for Canada	Bob Saroya	TBD
Rural Economic Development	Bernard Genereux	Damien Kurek
Seniors	Hon. Alice Wong	Martin Shields
Small Business and Export Promotion	James Cumming	Terry Dowdall
Transport	Todd Doherty	Tony Baldinelli
Treasury Board	Hon. Tim Uppal	Warren Steinley
Veterans Affairs	Phil McColeman	Cheryl Gallant; Cathay Wagantall
Women and Gender Equality	Karen Vecchio	Jag Sahota
Other Parliamentary Critics
Canada-US Relations	Colin Carrie	Chris Lewis
Democratic Institutions	Hon. Michael Chong	Eric Duncan
Economic Development (Atlantic Canada)	Chris d'Entremont	Richard Bragdon
Economic Development (Northern Ontario)	Cheryl Gallant	Eric Melillo
Economic Development (Quebec)	Bernard Genereux	None
Economic Development (Southern Ontario)	Colin Carrie	Chris Lewis
Economic Development (The North)	Bob Zimmer	David Yurdiga
Economic Development (Western Canada)	Blake Richards	None
Ethics	Michael Barrett	None
Forestry & Mining	Cathy McLeod	Gerald Soroka
Human Rights & Religious Freedom	David Sweet	None
Interprovincial Trade	Tracy Gray	None
Multiculturalism	Garnett Genuis	Jasraj Hallan
Tourism	Blake Richards	Scott Aitchison
