= Official Opposition Shadow Cabinet of the 39th Parliament of Canada =

The Official Opposition Shadow Cabinet of the 39th Canadian parliament is listed below. Members are drawn from the Liberal Party of Canada, and most are members of their parliamentary caucus. The shadow cabinet was most recently shuffled on March 31, 2008.

== Liberal Caucus Critics ==
Portfolio	Shadow Minister	
Leader of the Opposition	Hon. Stéphane Dion	(2006–)
Deputy Leader of the Opposition	Michael Ignatieff	(2006–)
Critic for the Minister of Agriculture and Agri-Food	Hon. Wayne Easter	(2006–)
Critic for the Minister for the Atlantic Canada Opportunities Agency	Jean-Claude D'Amours	(2007–)
Critic for the Minister of Canadian Heritage, la Francophonie and Official Languages	Hon. Denis Coderre	(2008–)
Critic for the Canadian International Development Agency	Hon. Keith Martin	(2007–)
Critic for the Minister of Citizenship and Immigration	Hon. Maurizio Bevilacqua	(2007–)
Critic for the Cities, Communities and Infrastructure	Paul Zed	(2007–)
Critic for Competitiveness and the New Economy	Sukh Dhaliwal	(2006–)
Critic for Consumer Affairs and Consular Services	Hon. Dan McTeague	(2007–)
Critic for Crown Corporations	Borys Wrzesnewskyj	(2007–)
Critic for Democratic Reform	Brian Murphy	(2007–)
Critic for the Minister of the Environment	David McGuinty	(2007–)
Critic for the Minister responsible for the Federal Economic Development Initiative for Northern Ontario	Ken Boshcoff	(2007–)
Critic for the Minister of Finance	Hon. John McCallum	(2006–)
Critic for the Minister of Fisheries and Oceans	Scott Simms	(2007–)
Critic for the Minister of Foreign Affairs	Hon. Bob Rae	(2007–)
Critic for the Minister of Foreign Affairs (Asia-Pacific)	Hon. Raymond Chan	(2007–)
Critic for the Minister of Health	Robert Thibault	(2006–)
Opposition House Leader	Hon. Ralph Goodale	(2006–)
Deputy Opposition House Leader	Hon. Marlene Jennings	(2008–)
Critic for the Minister of Human Resources and Skills Development	Mike Savage	(2006–)
Critic for Human Rights	Hon. Irwin Cotler	(2007–)
Critic for the Minister of Indian Affairs	Hon. Anita Neville	(2006–)
Critic for the Minister of Industry, Science and Technology	Hon. Scott Brison	(2007–)
Critic for the Minister of Intergovernmental Affairs	Gerard Kennedy	(2008–)
Critic for the Minister of International Trade	Hon. Navdeep Bains	(2007–)
Critic for the Minister of Justice and Attorney General	Dominic LeBlanc	(2007–)
Critic for the Minister of Labour	Hon. Judy Sgro	(2007–)
Critic for Multiculturalism	Colleen Beaumier	(2007–)
Critic for the Minister of National Defence	Hon. Bryon Wilfert	(2008–)
Critic for the Minister of National Revenue	Susan Kadis	(2008–)
Critic for the Minister of Natural Resources	Omar Alghabra	(2007–)
Critic for Northern Development	Hon. Larry Bagnell	(2006–)
Critic for the Pacific Gateway	Don Bell	(2007–)
Critic for Public Health, Seniors, Disabled and Social Economy	Hon. Carolyn Bennett	(2007–)
Critic for the Public Safety	Hon. Ujjal Dosanjh	(2007–)
Critic for the Minister of the Economic Development Agency for the Regions of Quebec	Pablo Rodriguez	(2007–)
Critic for the Minister of Public Works and Government Services and Procurement	Hon. Mark Holland	(2007–)
Leader of the Opposition in the Senate	Hon. Céline Hervieux-Payette	(2007–)
Critic for Rural Affairs	Hon. Charles Hubbard	(2007–)
Critic for the Minister of Social Development	Ruby Dhalla	(2007–)
Critic for Minister for Sport and Vancouver Olympics	Hon. Hedy Fry	(2007–)
Critic for Status of Women	Hon. Maria Minna	(2007–)
Critic for the Minister of Transport	Hon. Joe Volpe	(2006–)
Critic for the President of the Treasury Board	Mario Silva	(2006–)
Critic for the Minister of Veterans Affairs	Hon. Albina Guarnieri	(2006–)
Critic for the Minister of Western Economic Diversification	Hon. Raymond Simard	(2007–)
Critic for Water	Francis Scarpaleggia	(2007–)
Chief Opposition Whip	Hon. Karen Redman	(2006–)
Deputy Opposition Whip	Marcel Proulx	(2007–)

== Opposition Shadow Cabinet Committees ==
=== Priorities & Planning ===
- Stéphane Dion, chair
- Michael Ignatieff, vice-chair
- James Cowan
- Ken Dryden
- Martha Hall Findlay
- Ralph Goodale
- Céline Hervieux-Payette
- Dominic LeBlanc
- Keith Martin
- John McKay
- Massimo Pacetti
- Bernard Patry
- Marcel Proulx
- Bob Rae
- Karen Redman
- Geoff Regan
- Andy Scott
- Claudette Tardif
- Bryon Wilfert
- Paul Martin, special advisor

=== Economic Prosperity ===
- John McKay, chair
- Massimo Pacetti, vice-chair
- Gerry Byrne
- Roy Cullen
- Susan Kadis
- Gurbax Malhi
- John Maloney
- Robert Thibault
- Roger Valley
- Tom Wappel

=== Social Justice ===
- Ken Dryden, chair
- Andy Scott, vice-chair
- Bill Matthews
- Joe McGuire
- Brian Murphy
- Lloyd St. Amand
- Paul Szabo

=== Environmental Sustainability ===
- Geoff Regan, chair
- Joyce Murray, vice-chair
- John Cannis
- Nancy Karetak-Lindell
- Anthony Rota
- Francis Scarpaleggia
- Brent St. Denis
- Paul Steckle
- Alan Tonks

=== Canada & the World ===
- Bryon Wilfert, chair
- Keith Martin, vice-chair
- Rodger Cuzner
- Jim Karygiannis
- Derek Lee
- Glen Pearson
- Yasmin Ratansi
- Andrew Telegdi
- Lui Temelkovski

== See also ==
- Cabinet of Canada
- Official Opposition (Canada)
- Shadow Cabinet
- Bloc Québécois Shadow Cabinet
- New Democratic Party Shadow Cabinet
