= Bloc Québécois Shadow Cabinet of the 40th Parliament of Canada =

The Bloc Québécois shadow cabinet of the 40th Canadian Parliament is includes caucus officers and critics of the minority party.

== Caucus officers ==
- Leader (critic to the Prime Minister of Canada): Gilles Duceppe (1997-)
- House leader and Critic to the Minister responsible for Democratic Reform (Canada): Pierre Paquette (2007-)
- Deputy house leader: Christiane Gagnon (2008-)
- Chief whip: Michel Guimond (2006-)
- Deputy whip: Claude DeBellefeuille (2008-)
- Bloc Québécois caucus chair: Louis Plamondon (2006-)
- Chief organizer and critic to the Minister of Transport, Infrastructure and Communities: Mario Laframboise (2006-)

== Critics for Ministers or Departments ==
- Minister of Agriculture and Agri-Food: André Bellavance (2006-)
- Minister of Canadian Heritage and Status of Women (Canadian Heritage): Carole Lavallée (2008-)
- Minister of Canadian Heritage and Status of Women (Status of Women): Nicole Demers (2008-)
- Minister of Citizenship and Immigration: Thierry St-Cyr (2008-)
- Minister of the Economic Development Agency of Canada for the Regions of Quebec: Jean-Yves Roy (2008-)
- Minister of the Environment: Bernard Bigras (2000-)
- Minister of Finance: Jean-Yves Laforest (2008-)
- Minister of Fisheries and Oceans: Raynald Blais (2006-)
- Minister of Foreign Affairs: Francine Lalonde (1999-)
- Minister of Health: Luc Malo (2008-)
- Minister of Human Resources and Social Development: Yves Lessard (2004-)
- Minister of Indian Affairs and Northern Development: Marc Lemay (2006-)
- Minister of Industry: Paul Crête (2002-2009), Robert Bouchard (2009-)
- Minister for International Cooperation: Johanne Deschamps (2008-)
- Minister of International Trade: Serge Cardin (2006-)
- Minister of Justice (and Attorney General): Réal Ménard (2006-)
- Minister of Labour: Luc Desnoyers (2008-)
- Minister of National Defence: Claude Bachand (2000-)
- Minister of National Revenue: Robert Carrier (2008-)
- Minister of Natural Resources: Paule Brunelle (2008-)
- Minister of Public Security: Serge Ménard (2006-)
- Minister of Public Works and Government Services: Diane Bourgeois (2008-)
- President of the Queen's Privy Council for Canada and Minister of Intergovernmental Affairs: Jean Dorion (2008-)
- President of the Treasury Board: Richard Nadeau (2006-)
- Minister of Veterans Affairs: Guy André (2008-)

=== Special responsibilities ===
- Minister responsible for La Francophonie and Official languages: Richard Nadeau (2008-)
- Minister for Sport: Pascal-Pierre Paillé (2008-)

=== Policy areas for which there is no specific minister ===
- Asia-Pacific: Jean Dorion (2008-)
- Ethics, Access to Information and Privacy: Carole Freeman (2008-)
- Latin America and Africa: Johanne Deschamps (2006-)
- Housing: Christian Ouellet (2006-)
- Public Accounts: Meili Faille (2008-)
- Seniors: Carole Freeman (2008-)
- Youth: Nicolas Dufour (2008-)

== See also ==
- Cabinet of Canada
- Official Opposition (Canada)
- Official Opposition Shadow Cabinet (Canada)
- New Democratic Party Shadow Cabinet
