= Bloc Québécois Shadow Cabinet of the 39th Parliament of Canada =

The Bloc Québécois Shadow Cabinet of the 39th Canadian parliament is listed below. Its composition was announced on February 15, 2006. Modifications were made on September 12, 2006.

Portfolio	Critic	
Caucus Officers
Leader (Critic for the Prime Minister of Canada)	Gilles Duceppe	(1997–)
Chief Whip	Michel Guimond	(2006–)
Deputy Whip	Pauline Picard	(2006–)
House Leader and Critic for the Minister responsible for Democratic Reform	Michel Gauthier	(1997–2007)
House Leader and Critic for the Minister responsible for Democratic Reform	Pierre Paquette	(2007–)
Deputy House Leader	Monique Guay	(2006–2008)
Bloc Québécois Caucus Chair	Louis Plamondon	(2006–)
Critics for Ministers of departments
Minister of Agriculture and Agri-Food	André Bellavance	(2006–)
Minister of Canadian Heritage and Status of Women (Canadian Heritage)	Maka Kotto	(2004–2008)
Minister of Canadian Heritage and Status of Women (Status of Women)	Maria Mourani	(2006–2008)
Minister of Citizenship and Immigration	Meili Faille	(2004–2008)
Minister of the Economic Development Agency of Canada for the Regions of Quebec	Jean-Yves Laforest	(2006–2008)
Minister of the Environment	Bernard Bigras	(2000–)
Minister of Finance	Pierre Paquette	(2006–2008)
Minister of Fisheries and Oceans	Raynald Blais	(2006–)
Minister of Foreign Affairs	Francine Lalonde	(1999–)
Minister of Health	Christiane Gagnon	(2006–2008)
Minister of Human Resources and Social Development	Yves Lessard	(2004–)
Minister of Indian Affairs and Northern Development	Marc Lemay	(2006–)
Minister of Industry	Paul Crête	(2002–2009)
Minister for International Cooperation	Caroline St-Hilaire	(2006–2008)
Minister of International Trade	Serge Cardin	(2006–)
Minister of Justice and Attorney General	Réal Ménard	(2006–)
Minister of Labour	Carole Lavallée	(2004–2008)
Minister of National Defence	Claude Bachand	(2000–)
Minister of National Revenue	Robert Bouchard	(2004–2008)
Minister of Natural Resources	Claude DeBellefeuille	(2006–2008)
Minister of Public Safety	Serge Ménard	(2006–)
Minister of Public Works and Government Services	Jean-Yves Laforest	(2006–2008)
President of the Queen's Privy Council for Canada and Minister of Intergovernmental Affairs	Paule Brunelle	(2006–2008)
Minister of Transport, Infrastructure and Communities	Mario Laframboise	(2006–)
President of the Treasury Board	Richard Nadeau	(2006–)
Minister of Veterans Affairs	Gilles-A. Perron	(2006–2008)
Critics for Special Ministerial Responsibilities
Minister responsible for La Francophonie and Official Languages	Vivian Barbot	(2006–2008)
Minister for Sport	Luc Malo	(2006–2008)
Critics for Policy Areas for which there is no specific minister
Asia-Pacific	Diane Bourgeois	(2006–2008)
Latin America and Africa	Johanne Deschamps	(2006–)
Housing	Christian Ouellet	(2006–)
Seniors	Nicole Demers	(2006–2008)
Youth	Thierry St-Cyr	(2006–2008)

== See also ==
- Cabinet of Canada
- Official Opposition (Canada)
- Shadow Cabinet
- Official Opposition Shadow Cabinet (Canada)
- New Democratic Party Shadow Cabinet
