= Official Opposition Shadow Cabinet (Canada) =

Group of opposition politicians in Canada

The Official Opposition Shadow Cabinet (French: Cabinet fantôme de l'Opposition Officielle) in Canada is composed of members of the main opposition party, His Majesty's Loyal Opposition, and is responsible for holding the Government to account and for developing and disseminating the party's policy positions. Members of the official opposition are generally referred to as opposition critics (porte-paroles de l'opposition officielle), but the term Shadow Minister (which is generally used in other Westminster systems) is also used.

== By Parliament ==
The membership of the Shadow Cabinet in various parliaments may be found in the following articles:

- Official Opposition Shadow Cabinet of the 39th Parliament of Canada
- Official Opposition Shadow Cabinet of the 40th Parliament of Canada
- Official Opposition Shadow Cabinet of the 41st Parliament of Canada
- Official Opposition Shadow Cabinet of the 42nd Parliament of Canada
- Official Opposition Shadow Cabinet of the 43rd Parliament of Canada
- Official Opposition Shadow Cabinet of the 44th Parliament of Canada
- Official Opposition Shadow Cabinet of the 45th Parliament of Canada (current)

== Current ==
The current shadow cabinet is composed of members of the Conservative Party, led by Pierre Poilievre.

Portfolio	Critic	Deputy
House Leadership Team
Leader of the Opposition	Andrew Scheer	
Leader of the Conservative Party of Canada	Pierre Poilievre	Tim Uppal & Melissa Lantsman
Quebec Political Lieutenant	Pierre Paul-Hus	
Opposition Senate Leader	Leo Housakos	
Opposition Senate Whip		
Opposition House Leader	Hon. Andrew Scheer	Luc Berthold
Opposition Whip	Kerry-Lynne Findlay	Chris Warkentin
Caucus Chair	Jake Stewart	
Caucus-Party Liaison	Eric Duncan	
Question Period Coordinator	Chris Warkentin	
Shadow Cabinet
Digital Government	Ben Lobb	
Agriculture, Agri-Food, & Food Security	John Barlow	Richard Lehoux & Warren Steinley
Canadian Heritage	Rachael Thomas	Kevin Waugh
Crown–Indigenous Relations	Jamie Schmale	
Finance & Middle Class Prosperity	Jasraj Singh Hallan	Phil Lawrence (for Tax Reform) & Marty Morantz (for Affordable Government)
Employment, Future Workforce Development & Disability Inclusion	Tracy Gray	
Environment & Climate Change	Gérard Deltell	Robert Kitchen
Families, Children & Social Development	Michelle Ferreri	
Federal Economic Development Agency for Eastern, Central and Southern Ontario	Lianne Rood	
Fisheries, Oceans and the Canadian Coast Guard	Clifford Small	Mel Arnold (for Recreational & West Coast)
Foreign Affairs	Hon. Michael Chong	
Health	Dr. Stephen Ellis	
Housing and Diversity and Inclusion	Scott Aitchison	
Immigration, Refugees & Citizenship	Tom Kmiec	Brad Redekopp
Federal Economic Development Agency for Eastern, Central and Southern Ontario	Eric Melillo	
Innovation, Science & Industry	Rick Perkins	
International Development	Garnett Genuis	
International Trade	Kyle Seeback	Randy Hoback
Small Business Recovery & Growth	Brad Vis	
Supply Chain Issues	Matt Jeneroux	
Red Tape Reduction	Scot Davidson	
Justice and the Attorney General of Canada	Hon. Rob Moore	Frank Caputo
Civil Liberties	Marilyn Gladu	
Mental Health & Suicide Prevention	Todd Doherty	
Addictions	Laila Goodridge	
Northern Affairs & Arctic Sovereignty; Canadian Northern Economic Development Agency	Bob Zimmer	
Prairie Economic Development	Pat Kelly	
Pacific Economic Development	Tako van Popta	
Sport; Economic Development Agency of Canada for the Regions of Quebec	Richard Martel	
National Defence	James Bezan	Shelby Kramp-Neuman (for Recruitment and Retention)
National Revenue	Adam Chambers	
Natural Resources	Shannon Stubbs	Corey Tochor (for Nuclear)
Official Languages	Joël Godin	Bernard Généreux
Atlantic Canada Opportunities Agencies	Jake Stewart	
Public Safety	Raquel Dancho	Doug Shipley
Public Services & Procurement	Kelly Block	
Emergency Preparedness	Dane Lloyd	
Rural Economic Development & Connectivity	Dan Mazier	
Seniors	Anna Roberts	
Tourism	Tony Baldinelli	
Transport	Mark Strahl	Dan Muys
Treasury Board	Stephanie Kusie	
Veterans Affairs	Blake Richards	Fraser Tolmie
Women and Gender Equality and Youth	Karen Vecchio	Dominique Vien
Ethics and Accountable Government	Michael Barrett	Jacques Gourde
Infrastructure and Communities	Dr. Leslyn Lewis	
Labour	Chris Lewis	Rosemarie Falk
Indigenous Services	Gary Vidal	Larry Brock
Pan-Canadian Trade and Competition	Ryan Williams	
Hunting, Fishing and Conservation	Blaine Calkins	
Democratic Reform	Michael Cooper	
Special Advisor to the Leader on Canada/US Relations	Randy Hoback	
Special Advisor to the Leader on Economy	Pat Kelly	

== See also ==
- New Democratic Party Shadow Cabinet of the 42nd Parliament of Canada
