= Official Opposition Shadow Cabinet of the 40th Parliament of Canada =

- Shadow Cabinet of Canada
- 2008–2011

People and organizations
- Monarch: Elizabeth II
- Opposition leader: Michael Ignatieff
- Deputy Opposition leader: Ralph Goodale
- Opposition Opposition House Leader: David McGuinty
- Member party: Liberal
- Status in legislature: Official Opposition 77 / 308

History
- Election: 2008
- Legislature term: 40th Canadian Parliament
- Predecessor: 39th (2006–2008)
- Successor: 41st and 41st LPC (2011–2015)

The Official Opposition Shadow Cabinet of the 40th Canadian parliament is listed below. Members are drawn from the Liberal Party of Canada. Michael Ignatieff announced a new line-up of Liberal critics on 7 September 2010.

== Liberal Shadow Cabinet ==
=== Parliamentary leadership ===
- Leader of the Official Opposition & Intergovernmental Affairs – Michael Ignatieff
- Deputy Leader – Ralph Goodale
- Opposition House Leader – David McGuinty
- Deputy House Leader – Judy Foote
- Chief Opposition Whip – Marcel Proulx
- Deputy Opposition Whip – Yasmin Ratansi
- Leader of the Opposition in the Canadian Senate – Sen. Jim Cowan
- Deputy Leader of the Opposition in the Senate – Sen. Claudette Tardif
- Chief Opposition Whip in the Senate – Sen. Jim Munson

=== Shadow Ministers ===
- Aboriginal Affairs – Todd Russell
- Agriculture, Agri-food & Canadian Wheat Board – Wayne Easter
- Amateur Sport – Joyce Murray
- Arctic Issues & Northern Development – Larry Bagnell
- Canadian Heritage – Pablo Rodríguez
- Citizenship & Immigration – Justin Trudeau
- Consular Affairs, Consumer Affairs – Dan McTeague
- Crown Corporation – Bonnie Crombie
- Economic Development Agency for Regions of Quebec and Associate Finance Critic – Alexandra Mendes
- Democratic Renewal – Carolyn Bennett
- Environment – Gerard Kennedy
- Finance – Scott Brison
- Fisheries, Oceans & Atlantic Canada Opportunities Agency – Rodger Cuzner
- Foreign Affairs – Bob Rae
- La Francophonie – Raymonde Folco
- Health – Ujjal Dosanjh
- Human Resources & Skills Development – Mike Savage
- Human Rights – Irwin Cotler
- Industry, Science & Technology – Marc Garneau
- International Cooperation – Glen Pearson
- International Trade – Martha Hall Findlay
- Justice & Attorney-General – Marlene Jennings
- Labour – Maria Minna
- Multiculturalism – Rob Oliphant
- National Defence – Dominic LeBlanc
- National Revenue – Jean-Claude D’Amours
- Natural Resources – Denis Coderre
- Official Languages – Mauril Belanger
- Pacific Gateway and Western Economic Diversification – Sukh Dhaliwal
- Public Safety & National Security – Mark Holland
- Public Works & Government Services – Geoff Regan
- Rural Affairs – Mark Eyking
- Seniors and Pensions – Judy Sgro
- Small Business – Navdeep Bains
- Southern Ontario Development Agency – Frank Valeriote
- Status of Women – Anita Neville
- Transport, Infrastructure & Communities – John McCallum
- Treasury Board – Siobhan Coady
- Tourism – Gerry Byrne
- Veterans Affairs – Kirsty Duncan
- Water – Francis Scarpaleggia

== See also ==
- Cabinet of Canada
- Official Opposition (Canada)
- Shadow Cabinet
- Bloc Québécois Shadow Cabinet
- New Democratic Party Shadow Cabinet
