= Official Opposition Shadow Cabinet of the 44th Parliament of Canada =

Post-2021 political group

Shadow Cabinet of the 44th Parliament of Canada
- Official Opposition Shadow Cabinet of Canada
- September 10, 2022 – March 23, 2025
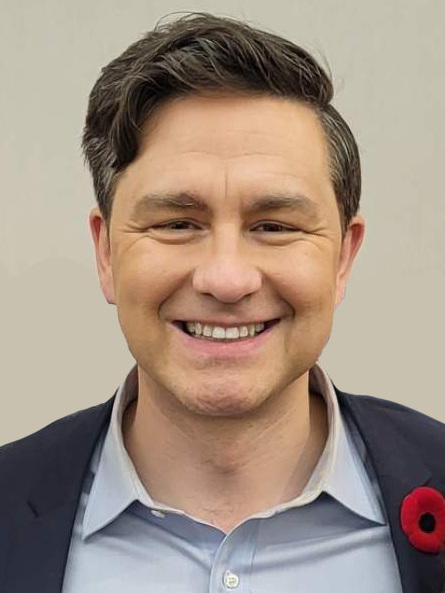

People and organizations
- Monarch: Elizabeth II; Charles III
- Opposition Leader: Pierre Poilievre
- Deputy Opposition Leader: Melissa Lantsman; Tim Uppal
- Opposition House Leader: Gérard Deltell (2020–2022); John Brassard (2022); Andrew Scheer (2022–present)
- Member party: Conservative Party of Canada
- Status in legislature: Official Opposition 120 / 338

History
- Incoming formation: 2022 Conservative Party leadership election
- Election: 2021
- Outgoing election: 2025
- Legislature term: 44th Parliament
- Predecessor: Official Opposition Shadow Cabinet of the 43rd Parliament of Canada
- Successor: Official Opposition Shadow Cabinet of the 45th Parliament of Canada

The Official Opposition Shadow Cabinet in Canada was appointed after the 2021 Canadian federal election in September 2021.

A new shadow cabinet was formed after the 2022 Conservative Party of Canada leadership election. Pierre Poilievre appointed a Shadow Cabinet in October 2022.

== List ==
=== Poilievre I (September 2021 – October 2022) ===
- Candice Bergen, Luc Berthold (from February 2022) - Deputy Leader of the Official Opposition

=== Poilievre II (October 2022 – March 2025) ===
==== Critics ====
- Melissa Lantsman and Tim Uppal - Deputy Leader of the Official Opposition
- Ben Lobb — Digital Government
- John Barlow — Agriculture, Agri-Food and Food Security
- Rachael Thomas — Canadian Heritage
- Jamie Schmale — Crown-Indigenous Relations
- Jasraj Singh Hallan — Finance and Middle Class Prosperity
- Tracy Gray — Employment, Future Workforce Development and Disability Inclusion
- Gérard Deltell — Environment and Climate Change
- Michelle Ferreri — Families, Children and Social Development
- Lianne Rood — Federal Economic Development Agency for Eastern, Central and Southern Ontario
- Clifford Small — Fisheries, Oceans and the Canadian Coast Guard
- Michael Chong — Foreign Affairs
- Stephen Ellis — Health
- Scott Aitchison — Housing and Diversity and Inclusion
- Tom Kmiec — Immigration, Refugees and Citizenship
- Eric Melillo — Federal Economic Development Agency for Northern Ontario (Associate, Crown-Indigenous Relations)
- Rick Perkins —Innovation, Science and Industry
- Garnett Genuis — International Development
- Kyle Seeback — International Trade
- Brad Vis — Small Business Recovery and Growth
- Matt Jeneroux — Supply Chain Issues
- Scot Davidson — Red Tape Reduction
- Rob Moore — Justice and Attorney General of Canada
- Marilyn Gladu — Civil Liberties
- Todd Doherty — Mental Health and Suicide Prevention
- Laila Goodridge — Addictions
- Bob Zimmer — Northern Affairs and Arctic Sovereignty; Canadian Northern Economic Development Agency
- Pat Kelly — Prairie Economic Development (Advisor to the Leader, Economy)
- Tako van Popta — Pacific Economic Development
- Richard Martel — Sport; Economic Development Agency of Canada for the Regions of Quebec
- James Bezan — National Defence
- Adam Chambers — National Revenue
- Shannon Stubbs — Natural Resources
- Joel Godin — Official Languages
- Jake Stewart — Atlantic Canada Opportunities Agency
- Raquel Dancho — Public Safety
- Kelly Block — Public Services and Procurement
- Dane Lloyd — Emergency Preparedness
- Dan Mazier — Rural Economic Development & Connectivity
- Anna Roberts — Seniors and Status of Women
- Tony Baldinelli — Tourism
- Mark Strahl — Transport
- Stephanie Kusie — Treasury Board
- Blake Richards — Veterans Affairs
- Michael Barrett — Ethics and Accountable Government
- Leslyn Lewis — Infrastructure and Communities
- Chris Lewis — Labour
- Gary Vidal — Indigenous Services
- Ryan Williams — Pan-Canadian Trade and Competition
- Blaine Calkins — Hunting, Fishing and Conservation
- Michael Cooper — Democratic Reform
