= Bloc Québécois Shadow Cabinet of the 42nd Parliament of Canada =

The Bloc Québécois Shadow Cabinet of the 42nd Canadian Parliament was announced in October 2015.

== Members of Shadow Cabinet ==
=== Ouellet (February 28, 2018 - 2019) ===
Portfolio	Critic
BQ Leader	Martine Ouellet (not an MP)
BQ House Leader (Parliamentary leader)	TBA
Budgetary Estimates, Economic Development, Government Operations (other positions TBA)	Xavier Barsalou-Duval
Immigration, La Francophonie (other positions TBA)	Mario Beaulieu
Natural Resources, Fisheries & Oceans, Indigenous & Northern Affairs (other positions TBA)	Marilène Gill

=== Fortin/Ouellet (October 19, 2015-February 28, 2018) ===
On February 28, 2018, eight MPs resigned from the Bloc Québécois caucus: Michel Boudrias (Terrebonne), Rhéal Fortin (Rivière-du-Nord), Simon Marcil (Mirabel), Monique Pauzé (Repentigny), Louis Plamondon (Bécancour—Nicolet—Saurel), Gabriel Ste-Marie (Joliette), and Luc Thériault (Montcalm) citing conflict with party leader Martine Ouellet.

Portfolio	Critic
Caucus officers
BQ Leader	Martine Ouellet (not an MP) (since March 14, 2017); Rhéal Fortin (until March 14, 2017)
BQ House Leader (also parliamentary leader after March 19, 2017)	Gabriel Ste-Marie (March 19, 2017 - February 26, 2018); Luc Thériault (until March 18, 2017)
Opposition Whip	Monique Pauzé (until February 28, 2018)
Caucus Chair	Louis Plamondon (until February 28, 2018)
Parliamentary critics
Agriculture	Simon Marcil (until February 28, 2018)
Budgetary Estimates	Xavier Barsalou-Duval
Canadian Heritage	Monique Pauzé (until February 28, 2018)
Democratic Reform	Luc Thériault (until February 28, 2018)
Economic Development	Xavier Barsalou-Duval
Employment & Labour	Simon Marcil (until February 28, 2018)
Environment	Monique Pauzé (until February 28, 2018)
Families & Children	Simon Marcil (until February 28, 2018)
Finance	Gabriel Ste-Marie (until February 28, 2018)
Fisheries & Oceans	Marilène Gill
Foreign Affairs	Luc Thériault (until February 28, 2018)
Government Operations	Xavier Barsalou-Duval
Health	Luc Thériault (until February 28, 2018)
Human Rights	Rhéal Fortin (until February 28, 2018)
Immigration	Mario Beaulieu
Indigenous & Northern Affairs	Marilène Gill
Infrastructure & Communities	Louis Plamondon (until February 28, 2018)
Innovation	Gabriel Ste-Marie (until February 28, 2018)
Intergovernmental Affairs	Rhéal Fortin (until February 28, 2018)
International Development	Luc Thériault (until February 28, 2018)
International Trade	Gabriel Ste-Marie (until February 28, 2018)
Justice	Rhéal Fortin (until February 28, 2018)
La Francophonie	Mario Beaulieu
National Defence	Michel Boudrias (until February 28, 2018)
National Revenue	Xavier Barsalou-Duval
Natural Resources	Marilène Gill
Persons with Disabilities	Simon Marcil (until February 28, 2018)
Pipelines	Luc Thériault (until February 28, 2018)
Public Accounts	Xavier Barsalou-Duval
Public Safety	Michel Boudrias (until February 28, 2018)
Science	Gabriel Ste-Marie (until February 28, 2018)
Seniors	Louis Plamondon (until February 28, 2018)
Status of Women	Monique Pauzé (until February 28, 2018)
Sustainable Development	Monique Pauzé (until February 28, 2018)
Transport	Louis Plamondon (until February 28, 2018)
Treasury Board	Gabriel Ste-Marie (until February 28, 2018)
Veterans Affairs	Michel Boudrias (until February 28, 2018)
