= Official Opposition Shadow Cabinet of the 41st Parliament of Canada =

- Shadow Cabinet of Canada

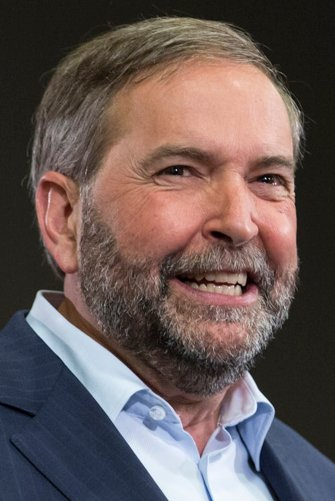
- Date formed: May 26, 2011
- Date dissolved: October 19, 2015

People and organizations
- Monarch: Elizabeth II
- Opposition leader: Jack Layton (2011) Nycole Turmel (2011–2012) Thomas Mulcair (2012–2015)
- Opposition House Leader: Peter Julian
- Opposition Whip: Nycole Turmel
- Member party: New Democratic Party
- Status in legislature: Official Opposition 105 / 308

History
- Election: 2011
- Legislature term: 41st Canadian Parliament
- Predecessor: 40th and 40th NDP (2008–2011)
- Successor: 42nd and 42nd NDP (2015–2019)

The Official Opposition Shadow Cabinet in Canada is composed of members of the main Opposition party responsible for holding the Government to account and for developing and disseminating the party's policy positions. Members of the Official Opposition are generally referred to as Opposition Critics, but the term Shadow Minister (which is generally used in other Westminster systems) is also used.

== By Member ==
Following the 41st Canadian general election, held on May 2, 2011, the New Democratic Party replaced the Liberal Party of Canada as the Official Opposition in the 41st Parliament. 83 MPs have served in the Official Opposition Cabinet in the 41st Parliament. Highlight indicates Member was a Senior Shadow Minister at dissolution.

Portrait	Shadow Minister	Portfolio	Tenure
	Malcolm Allen	Agriculture	May 26, 2011 — October 19, 2015
	Malcolm Allen	Deputy Natural Resources	January 23, 2011 — October 19, 2015
	Charlie Angus	Ethics	May 26, 2011 – October 19, 2015
	Niki Ashton	Status of Women	April 19, 2012 — January 22, 2015
	Niki Ashton	Aboriginal Affairs	January 23, 2015 — October 19, 2015
	Robert Aubin	La Francophonie	May 26, 2011 — April 18, 2012
	Robert Aubin	Deputy Transport	April 19, 2012 — August 12, 2013
	Robert Aubin	Deputy Infrastructure and Communities	April 19, 2012 — August 12, 2013
	Paulina Ayala	Consular Services	May 26, 2011 — April 18, 2012
	Paulina Ayala	Deputy Consular Services	April 19, 2012 — October 19, 2015
	Tyrone Benskin	Canadian Heritage	May 26, 2011 — April 18, 2012
	Tyrone Benskin	Deputy Official Languages	April 19, 2012 — May 27, 2013
	Dennis Bevington	Deputy Aboriginal Affairs	May 26, 2011 — April 18, 2012
	Dennis Bevington	Canadian Northern Economic Development	April 19, 2012 — October 19, 2015
	Denis Blanchette	Deputy Public Works and Government Services	April 19, 2012 — August 13, 2013
	Lysane Blanchette-Lamothe	Deputy Seniors	May 26, 2011 — April 18, 2012
	Lysane Blanchette-Lamothe	Seniors	April 19, 2012 — August 12, 2013
	Lysane Blanchette-Lamothe	Citizenship and Immigration	August 13, 2013 — October 19, 2015
	Françoise Boivin	Status of Women	May 26, 2011 — April 18, 2012
	Françoise Boivin	Deputy Justice	September 21, 2011 — April 18, 2012
	Françoise Boivin	Justice	April 19, 2012 — October 19, 2015
	Charmaine Borg	Digital Issues	April 19, 2012 — October 19, 2015
	Marjolaine Boutin-Sweet	Housing	April 19, 2012 — October 19, 2015
	Marjolaine Boutin-Sweet	Deputy Human Resources and Skills Development	April 19, 2012 — August 12, 2013
	Marjolaine Boutin-Sweet	Infrastructure and Communities	August 13, 2013 — January 22, 2015
	Marjolaine Boutin-Sweet	Deputy Infrastructure and Communities	January 21, 2015 — October 19, 2015
	Alexandre Boulerice	Treasury Board	May 26, 2011 — April 18, 2012
	Alexandre Boulerice	Labour	April 19, 2012 — October 19, 2015
	Ruth Ellen Brosseau	Deputy Agriculture	April 19, 2012 — October 19, 2015
	Guy Caron	Industry	November 1, 2011 — April 18, 2012
	Guy Caron	Deputy Finance	April 19, 2012 — October 19, 2015
	Guy Caron	Deputy International Trade	January 17, 2013 — January 22, 2015
	Andrew Cash	Deputy Housing	May 26, 2011 — April 18, 2012
	Andrew Cash	Deputy Canadian Heritage	April 19, 2012 — August 12, 2013
	Andrew Cash	Multiculturalism	August 13, 2013 — October 19, 2015
	Andrew Cash	Consumer Affairs	January 23, 2015 — October 19, 2015
	Chris Charlton	Chief Opposition Whip	May 26, 2011 — April 18, 2012
	Chris Charlton	Human Resources and Skills Development	April 19, 2012 — August 12, 2013
	Chris Charlton	Industry	August 13, 2013 — March 19, 2014
	Chris Charlton	Natural Resources	March 20, 2014 — January 22, 2015
	Sylvain Chicoine	Deputy Public Safety	May 26, 2011 — April 18, 2012
	Sylvain Chicoine	Deputy Veterans Affairs	April 19, 2012 — October 19, 2015
	Robert Chisholm	International Trade	May 26, 2011 — October 31, 2011
	Robert Chisholm	Fisheries and Oceans	April 19, 2012 — October 19, 2015
	Robert Chisholm	Atlantic Gateway	April 19, 2012 — August 12, 2013
	Robert Chisholm	Deputy Intergovernmental Affairs	April 19, 2012 — August 12, 2013
	François Choquette	Deputy Environment	August 13, 2013 — October 19, 2015
	Olivia Chow	Transportation	May 26, 2011 — March 13, 2014
	David Christopherson	Democratic Reform	May 26, 2011 — April 18, 2012
	David Christopherson	Public Safety and Emergency Preparedness	October 14, 2011 — April 18, 2012
	David Christopherson	Deputy NDP Leader (Ontario)	April 19, 2012 — October 19, 2015
	Ryan Cleary	Post Secondary Education	April 19, 2012 — October 19, 2015
	Ryan Cleary	Atlantic Canada Opportunities Agency	April 19, 2012 — October 19, 2015
	Joe Comartin	Justice	May 26, 2011 — October 12, 2011
	Joe Comartin	Opposition House Leader	October 13, 2011 — April 18, 2012
	Joe Comartin	Democratic Reform	April 19, 2012 — September 16, 2012
	Raymond Côté	Small Business & Tourism	May 26, 2011 — April 18, 2012
	Nathan Cullen	Deputy Natural Resources (Western Canada)	May 26, 2011 — October 2, 2011
	Nathan Cullen	Opposition House Leader	April 19, 2012 — March 19, 2014
	Nathan Cullen	Finance	March 20, 2014 — October 19, 2015
	Jean Crowder	Human Resources and Social Development	May 26, 2011 — April 18, 2012
	Jean Crowder	Privacy	October 3, 2011 — April 18, 2012
	Jean Crowder	Aboriginal Affairs	April 19, 2012 — January 22, 2015
	Don Davies	Citizenship and Immigration	May 26, 2011 — April 18, 2012
	Don Davies	International Trade	April 19, 2012 — October 19, 2015
	Don Davies	Deputy Multiculturalism	August 13, 2013 — October 19, 2015
	Don Davies	Deputy Citizenship and Immigration	January 23, 2015 — October 19, 2015
	Libby Davies	Deputy NDP Leader (Western Canada)	May 26, 2011 — October 19, 2015
	Libby Davies	Health	May 26, 2011 — January 22, 2015
	Anne-Marie Day	Deputy Human Resources and Skills Development	May 26, 2011 — April 18, 2012
	Anne-Marie Day	Deputy Public Works and Government Services	August 13, 2013 — January 22, 2015
	Anne-Marie Day	La Francophonie	January 23, 2015 — October 19, 2015
	Paul Dewar	Foreign Affairs	May 26, 2011 — October 2, 2011
	Paul Dewar	Foreign Affairs	April 19, 2012 — October 19, 2015
	Pierre Dionne Labelle	La Francophonie	April 19, 2012 — January 22, 2015
	Pierre Dionne Labelle	National Revenue	January 23, 2015 — October 19, 2015
	Fin Donnelly	Fisheries and Oceans	May 26, 2011 — April 18, 2012
	Fin Donnelly	Western Economic Diversification	April 19, 2012 — August 12, 2013
	Fin Donnelly	Deputy Fisheries and Oceans	August 13, 2013 — October 19, 2015
	Fin Donnelly	Deputy Infrastructure and Communities	August 13, 2013 — October 19, 2015
	Rosane Doré Lefebvre	Deputy Public Safety	April 19, 2012 — October 19, 2015
	Matthew Dubé	Deputy Post Secondary Education	May 26, 2011 — April 18, 2012
	Matthew Dubé	Sport	April 19, 2012 — October 19, 2015
	Matthew Dubé	Youth	August 13, 2013 — October 19, 2015
	Linda Duncan	Aboriginal Affairs	May 26, 2011 — April 18, 2012
	Linda Duncan	Public Works and Government Services	April 19, 2012 — August 12, 2013
	Linda Duncan	Western Economic Diversification	August 13, 2013 — October 19, 2015
	Mylène Freeman	Status of Women	January 23, 2015 — October 19, 2015
	Randall Garrison	LGBT Issues	May 26, 2011 — October 19, 2015
	Randall Garrison	Public Safety and Emergency Preparedness	April 19, 2012 — October 19, 2015
	Jonathan Genest-Jourdain	Deputy Aboriginal Affairs	May 26, 2011 — October 19, 2015
	Yvon Godin	Labour	May 26, 2011 — April 18, 2012
	Yvon Godin	Official Languages	May 26, 2011 — January 22, 2015
	Claude Gravelle	Natural Resources	October 3, 2011 — April 18, 2012
	Claude Gravelle	Official Languages	January 23, 2015 — October 19, 2015
	Sadia Groguhé	Deputy Citizenship and Immigration	May 26, 2011 — August 12, 2013
	Sadia Groguhé	Deputy Multiculturalism	May 26, 2011 — August 12, 2013
	Sadia Groguhé	Deputy Opposition House Leader	April 19, 2012 — August 12, 2013
	Sadia Groguhé	Deputy Chief Opposition Whip	August 13, 2013 — October 19, 2015
	Sadia Groguhé	Deputy Employment and Social Development	August 13, 2013 — October 19, 2015
	Dan Harris	Deputy Science and Technology	May 26, 2011 — April 18, 2012
	Dan Harris	Deputy Industry	April 19, 2012 — August 12, 2013
	Jack Harris	Justice	May 26, 2011 — April 18, 2012
	Jack Harris	National Defence	April 19, 2012 — October 19, 2015
	Carol Hughes	Deputy Aboriginal Affairs (Aboriginal Health)	April 19, 2012 — October 19, 2015
	Peter Julian	Industry	May 26, 2011 — October 31, 2011
	Peter Julian	Finance	October 28, 2011 — April 18, 2012
	Peter Julian	Natural Resources	April 19, 2012 — March 19, 2014
	Peter Julian	Opposition House Leader	March 20, 2014 — October 19, 2015
	Matthew Kellway	Deputy National Defence (Military Procurement)	May 26, 2011 — August 12, 2013
	Matthew Kellway	Urban Affairs	August 13, 2013 — October 19, 2015
	Matthew Kellway	Deputy Transport	March 20, 2014 — October 19, 2015
	Matthew Kellway	Infrastructure and Communities	January 23, 2015 — October 19, 2015
	François Lapointe	Small Business and Tourism	April 19, 2012 — August 12, 2013
	François Lapointe	Economic Development (Quebec)	August 13, 2013 — October 19, 2015
	Alexandrine Latendresse	Deputy Democratic Reform	May 26, 2011 — October 19, 2015
	Hélène Laverdière	International Cooperation	May 26, 2011 — October 2, 2011
	Hélène Laverdière	Deputy Foreign Affairs	May 26, 2011 — October 2, 2011
	Hélène Laverdière	Foreign Affairs	October 3, 2011 — April 18, 2012
	Hélène Laverdière	Consular Services	April 19, 2012 — August 12, 2013
	Hélène Laverdière	International Cooperation	October 22, 2012 — October 19, 2015
	Hélène Laverdière	Deputy Foreign Affairs	August 13, 2013 — October 19, 2015
	Jack Layton	Leader of the NDP	May 26, 2011 – August 22, 2011
	Jack Layton	Leader of the Opposition	May 26, 2011 – August 22, 2011
	Jack Layton	Intergovernmental Affairs	May 26, 2011 – August 22, 2011
	Hélène LeBlanc	Science and Technology	May 26, 2011 — April 18, 2012
	Hélène LeBlanc	Industry	April 19, 2012 — August 12, 2013
	Megan Leslie	Environment	May 26, 2011 — October 19, 2015
	Megan Leslie	Deputy NDP Leader (Atlantic Canada)	April 19, 2012 — October 19, 2015
	Hoang Mai	National Revenue	May 26, 2011 — January 16, 2013
	Hoang Mai	Deputy Justice	January 17, 2013 — August 12, 2013
	Hoang Mai	Deputy Transport	August 13, 2013 — March 19, 2014
	Hoang Mai	Transport	March 20, 2014 — October 19, 2015
	Wayne Marston	Human Rights	May 26, 2011 — October 19, 2015
	Wayne Marston	Economic Development (S. Ontario)	April 19, 2012 — August 12, 2013
	Wayne Marston	Consular Affairs	August 13, 2013 — October 19, 2015
	Wayne Marston	Deputy Labour	August 13, 2013 — October 19, 2015
	Brian Masse	International Trade	November 1, 2011 — April 18, 2012
	Brian Masse	Economic Development (S. Ontario)	August 13, 2013 — October 19, 2015
	Brian Masse	Small Business and Tourism	January 23, 2015 — October 19, 2015
	Pat Martin	Canadian Wheat Board	May 26, 2011 — August 12, 2013
	Pat Martin	Public Works and Government Services	August 13, 2013 — October 19, 2015
	Irene Mathyssen	Seniors	May 26, 2011 — April 18, 2012
	Irene Mathyssen	Pensions	April 19, 2012 — August 12, 2013
	Irene Mathyssen	Seniors	August 13, 2013 — October 19, 2015
	Irene Mathyssen	Deputy Canadian Heritage	August 13, 2013 — October 19, 2015
	Élaine Michaud	Deputy National Defence	August 13, 2013 — October 19, 2015
	Christine Moore	Deputy National Defence	May 26, 2011 — August 12, 2013
	Christine Moore	Deputy Natural Resources	January 17, 2013 — January 22, 2015
	Christine Moore	Deputy Health	January 23, 2015 — October 19, 2015
	Dany Morin	Deputy LGBT Issues	May 26, 2011 — August 12, 2013
	Dany Morin	Deputy Health	August 13, 2013 — January 22, 2015
	Dany Morin	Deputy Public Works and Government Services	January 23, 2015 — October 19, 2015
	Marie-Claude Morin	Housing	October 3, 2011 — April 18, 2012
	Thomas Mulcair	Opposition House Leader	May 26, 2011 — October 12, 2011
	Thomas Mulcair	Leader of the NDP	April 19, 2012 – October 19, 2015
	Thomas Mulcair	Leader of the Opposition	April 19, 2012 – October 19, 2015
	Thomas Mulcair	Intergovernmental Affairs	April 19, 2012 – October 19, 2015
	Pierre Nantel	Sport	May 26, 2011 — October 31, 2011
	Pierre Nantel	Canadian Heritage	April 19, 2012 — October 19, 2015
	Peggy Nash	Finance	May 26, 2011 — October 27, 2011
	Peggy Nash	Finance	April 19, 2012 — March 19, 2014
	Peggy Nash	Industry	March 20, 2014 — October 19, 2015
	Jamie Nicholls	Deputy Transport, Infrastructure and Communities	May 26, 2011 — April 18, 2012
	Jamie Nicholls	Deputy Natural Resources	April 19, 2012 — August 12, 2013
	Jamie Nicholls	Deputy Official Languages	August 13, 2013 — October 19, 2015
	Annick Papillon	Deputy Veterans Affairs	May 26, 2011 — April 18, 2012
	Annick Papillon	Deputy Small Business and Tourism	August 13, 2013 — October 19, 2015
	Ève Péclet	Deputy Foreign Affairs	April 19, 2012 — August 12, 2013
	Ève Péclet	Deputy Justice	August 13, 2013 — October 19, 2015
	John Rafferty	Economic Development (N. Ontario)	April 19, 2012 – October 19, 2015
	John Rafferty	Pensions	January 23, 2015 – October 19, 2015
	Murray Rankin	National Revenue	January 17, 2013 — January 22, 2015
	Murray Rankin	Health	January 23, 2015 — October 19, 2015
	Murray Rankin	Deputy National Revenue	January 23, 2015 — October 19, 2015
	Mathieu Ravignat	Public Works and Government Services	May 26, 2011 — April 18, 2012
	Mathieu Ravignat	Deputy International Trade	May 26, 2011 — September 20, 2011
	Mathieu Ravignat	Treasury Board	April 19, 2012 — October 19, 2015
	Jean Rousseau	Deputy Agriculture	May 26, 2011 — April 18, 2012
	Jean Rousseau	Deputy Public Works and Government Services	April 19, 2012 — August 12, 2013
	Anne Minh-Thu Quach	Deputy Health	May 26, 2011 — April 18, 2012
	Anne Minh-Thu Quach	Deputy Environment	April 19, 2012 — August 12, 2013
	Anne Minh-Thu Quach	Deputy Industry	August 13, 2013 — October 19, 2015
	Jasbir Sandhu	Public Safety and Emergency Preparedness	May 26, 2011 — April 18, 2012
	Jasbir Sandhu	Asia-Pacific Gateway	April 19, 2012 — October 19, 2015
	Craig Scott	Deputy Justice	April 19, 2012 — January 16, 2013
	Craig Scott	Democratic Reform	September 20, 2012 — October 19, 2015
	Djaouida Sellah	Deputy Health	April 19, 2012 — August 12, 2013
	Jinny Sims	International Cooperation	May 26, 2011 — April 18, 2012
	Jinny Sims	Deputy Consular Services	May 26, 2011 — October 2, 2011
	Jinny Sims	Deputy Foreign Affairs	May 26, 2011 — April 18, 2012
	Jinny Sims	Citizenship and Immigration	April 19, 2012 — August 12, 2013
	Jinny Sims	Multiculturalism	April 19, 2012 — August 12, 2013
	Jinny Sims	Employment and Social Development	August 13, 2013 — October 19, 2015
	Rathika Sitsabaiesan	Post Secondary Education	May 26, 2011 — April 18, 2012
	Kennedy Stewart	Deputy Natural Resources (Western Canada)	October 3, 2011 — April 18, 2012
	Peter Stoffer	Veterans Affairs	May 26, 2011 — October 19, 2015
	Glenn Thibeault	Sport	November 1, 2011 — April 18, 2012
	Glenn Thibeault	Small Business and Tourism	August 13, 2013 — January 22, 2015
	Glenn Thibeault	Consumer Affairs	August 13, 2013 — January 22, 2015
	Philip Toone	Deputy Fisheries and Oceans	May 26, 2011 — October 19, 2015
	Philip Toone	Deputy Chief Opposition Whip	May 26, 2011 — August 12, 2013
	Philip Toone	Deputy Opposition House Leader	August 13, 2013 — October 19, 2015
	Nycole Turmel	Public Works and Government Services	May 26, 2011 — August 22, 2011
	Nycole Turmel	Leader of the NDP	August 23, 2011 – March 23, 2012
	Nycole Turmel	Leader of the Opposition	August 23, 2011 – March 23, 2012
	Nycole Turmel	Intergovernmental Affairs	August 23, 2011 – April 18, 2012
	Nycole Turmel	Chief Opposition Whip	April 19, 2012 — October 19, 2015

== Composition ==
Party leader Jack Layton announced his first Shadow Cabinet as Leader of the Opposition on May 26, 2011. Layton went on a leave of absence beginning July 28, 2011, in order to fight a new cancer and Nycole Turmel was appointed interim leader. Jack Layton died on August 22, 2011.

Thomas Mulcair was elected leader of the NDP, and by extension Leader of the Opposition, at a leadership election held on March 24, 2012, and reshuffled the Shadow Cabinet on April 19, 2012. Craig Scott replaced Joe Comartin as Democratic Reform critic after the latter became Deputy Speaker in September 2012. On January 17, 2013, Mulcair replaced Hoang Mai with Murray Rankin as National Revenue critic. The shadow cabinet was last shuffled on March 20, 2014.

Portfolio	Critic
Leader of the Opposition; Leader of the NDP; Intergovernmental Affairs	Hon. Thomas Mulcair
Deputy Leader of the NDP; Health	Libby Davies
Deputy Leader of the NDP	David Christopherson
Deputy Leader of the NDP; Environment	Megan Leslie
Opposition House Leader; Caucus Chair	Peter Julian
Deputy Opposition House Leader; Deputy Employment and Social Development	Sadia Groguhé
Opposition Whip	Nycole Turmel
Deputy Opposition Whip; Deputy Fisheries (East Coast)	Philip Toone
Agriculture and Agri-Food	Malcolm Allen
Ethics, Access to Information and Privacy	Charlie Angus
Employment Insurance	Robert Aubin
Women	Niki Ashton
Canadian Northern Economic Development Agency	Dennis Bevington
Citizenship and Immigration	Lysane Blanchette-Lamothe
Justice	Françoise Boivin
Digital Issues	Charmaine Borg
Labour; Deputy Ethics, Access to Information and Privacy	Alexandre Boulerice
Housing and Infrastructure	Marjolaine Boutin-Sweet
Multiculturalism	Andrew Cash
Energy and Natural Resources	Chris Charlton
Fisheries; Deputy Employment Insurance	Robert Chisholm
Atlantic Canada Opportunities Agency	Ryan Cleary
Aboriginal Affairs	Jean Crowder
Finance	Nathan Cullen
International Trade; Deputy Multiculturalism	Don Davies
Employment Insurance	Anne-Marie Day
Foreign Affairs	Paul Dewar
La Francophonie	Pierre Dionne Labelle
Western Economic Diversification Canada	Linda Duncan
Sport; Youth	Matthew Dubé
Public Safety; LGBT Issues	Randall Garrison
Official Languages	Yvon Godin
Post-Secondary Education	Dan Harris
National Defence	Jack Harris
Urban Affairs; Deputy Transport	Matthew Kellway
Canada Economic Development for Quebec Regions	François Lapointe
International Development; Deputy Foreign Affairs	Hélène Laverdière
Co-operatives	Hélène Leblanc
Transport	Hoang Mai
Human Rights; Americas and Consular Affairs; Deputy Labour	Wayne Marston
Public Works and Government Services	Pat Martin
Seniors; Deputy Heritage	Irene Mathyssen
Federal Economic Development Agency for Southern Ontario; Canada–US Border & Great Lakes	Brian Masse
Industry	Peggy Nash
Heritage	Pierre Nantel
Disabilities Issues	Mike Sullivan
Federal Economic Development Initiative for Northern Ontario	John Rafferty
National Revenue; Pensions	Murray Rankin
Treasury Board	Mathieu Ravignat
Economic Development Agency for the Regions of Quebec	Jean Rousseau
Asia–Pacific Gateway	Jasbir Sandhu
Democratic and Parliamentary Reform	Craig Scott
Employment and Social Development	Jinny Sims
Caucus Vice-chair	Rathika Sitsabaiesan
Science and Technology	Kennedy Stewart
Veterans Affairs	Peter Stoffer
Small Business and Tourism; Consumer Protection	Brian Masse

== See also ==
- New Democratic Party Shadow Cabinet of the 40th Parliament of Canada
- Liberal Party Shadow Cabinet of the 41st Parliament of Canada
- Bloc Québécois Shadow Cabinet of the 41st Parliament of Canada
- Cabinet of Canada
- Official Opposition (Canada)
- Official Opposition Shadow Cabinet (British Columbia)
- Shadow Cabinet
