= Bloc Québécois Shadow Cabinet of the 45th Parliament of Canada =

Bloc Québécois Shadow Cabinet of the 45th Canadian Parliament
- Third party of the House of Commons
- Date formed: 2025

People and organizations
- Monarch: Charles III
- Party Leader: Yves-François Blanchet
- House Leader: Christine Normandin
- Whip: Claude DeBellefeuille
- Member party: Bloc Québécois
- Status in legislature: Opposition 22 / 338

History
- Election: 2025
- Legislature term: 45th Parliament of Canada

This is a list of members of the Bloc Québécois Shadow Cabinet of the 45th Canadian Parliament.

== Members ==
The shadow cabinet was named following the 2025 Canadian federal election:

- Yves-François Blanchet (Beloeil—Chambly): Leader of the Bloc
- Louis Plamondon (Bécancour—Nicolet—Saurel—Alnôbak): Vice-Chair
- Yves Perron (Berthier—Maskinongé): Agriculture, Agri-Food, and Supply Management
- Claude DeBellefeuille (Beauharnois—Salaberry—Soulanges—Huntingdon): Public Safety and Emergency Preparedness
- Sébastien Lemire (Abitibi—Témiscamingue): Indigenous Relations, Northern Development, Sports, and Public Accounts
- Marilène Gill (Côte-Nord—Kawawachikamach—Nitassinan): deputy whip; Labour, Human Resources, Skills Development, Social Development and the Status of Persons with Disabilities
- Martin Champoux (Drummond): Heritage, Arts and Culture, Secularism, Quebec Values, and Living Together
- Alexis Deschênes (Gaspésie—Les Îles-de-la-Madeleine—Listuguj): Fisheries and Oceans
- Gabriel Ste-Marie (Joliette—Manawan): Industries, Social Solidarity, and Housing
- Mario Simard (Jonquière): Intergovernmental Affairs and Natural Resources
- Mario Beaulieu (La Pointe-de-l'Île): Official Languages (Francophones outside Quebec) and the Court Challenges Program
- Alexis Brunelle-Duceppe (Lac-Saint-Jean): Foreign Affairs, International Development and Cooperation, Immigration, Refugees and Citizenship, and Human Rights
- Marie-Hélène Gaudreau (Laurentides—Labelle): Tourism, Government Operations and Estimates, and critic for Veterans Affairs
- Jean-Denis Garon (Mirabel): Finance, National Revenue and Aeronautics
- Christine Normandin (Saint-Jean): House Leader
- Luc Thériault (Montcalm): Health, Medical Assistance in Dying, Ethics, Protection of Personal Information and Access to Information
