= Bloc Québécois Shadow Cabinet of the 41st Parliament of Canada =

The Bloc Québécois Shadow Cabinet of the 41st Canadian Parliament was announced on June 2, 2011, and shuffled in 2013:

- Louis Plamondon: Interim House Leader (2011) and Critic for the Prime Minister of Canada (2011-2013), Veterans Affairs (2011-), National Revenue (2013-), Seniors (2013-), Public Works and Government Services (2013-2013), Canadian Heritage (2011-2013), Democratic Reform (2011-2013), Finance (2011-2012), (2013-)
- Claude Patry: Critic for Forestry (2013-), Industry (2013-), Labour (2013-), Science and Technology (2013-)

== Former members ==
- Maria Mourani (expelled from BQ caucus on September 12, 2013): Critic for Environment (2011-2013), Human Rights (2011-2013), Official Languages (2011-2013), Status of Women (2011-2013), Transport, Infrastructure and Communities (2011-2013), Justice (2011-2013), Public Safety (2010-2013), Citizenship and Immigration (2013-2013), Aboriginal Affairs (2013-2013), Housing (2013-2013)
- Jean-François Fortin (quit the BQ caucus on August 12, 2014, to sit as an independent): Interim House Leader (2014), Critic for Fisheries and Oceans (2011-2014), Foreign Affairs (2011-2014), Human Resources and Social Development (2011-2014), Intergovernmental Affairs (2011-2014), International Cooperation (2011-2014), Small Business (2013-2014), Natural Resources (2013-2014), Tourism (2013-2014), National Defence (2011-2014), Privy Council (2011-2013), Economic Development Agency of Canada for the Regions of Quebec (2011-2014), Access to Information (2011-2013), Employment Insurance (2011-2014), Privacy (2011-2013), Environment (2013-2014), Regional Development (2013-2014), Public Works and Government Services (2011-2013)
- André Bellavance (quit the BQ caucus on August 25, 2014, to sit as an independent): Interim House Leader (2011-2014), Critic for Parliamentary Affairs (2011-2014), Prime Minister of Canada (2013-2014), Agriculture and Agri-Food (2005-2014), Science and Technology (2011-2014), Health (2011-2014), Public Works and Government Services (2013-2014), Sports (2013-2014), Privacy (2013-2014), Privy Council (2013-2014), Natural Resources (2011-2014), International Trade (2011-2014), Democratic Reform (2013-2014), Ethics (2013-2014), Access to Information (2013-2014), Interprovincial Trade (2013-2014), Citizenship and Immigration (2011-2013)

== See also ==
- Official Opposition (Canada)
- Shadow Cabinet
- Politics of Canada
