= Liberal Party Shadow Cabinet of the 41st Parliament of Canada =

The Liberal Party of Canada's Shadow Cabinet of the 41st Canadian Parliament was shuffled on April 17, 2013 and selected by leader Justin Trudeau. The shadow cabinet was also shuffled on August 21, 2013.

== Liberal Shadow Cabinet ==
=== Parliamentary leadership ===
- Justin Trudeau - Leader, Youth
- Ralph Goodale - Deputy Leader
- Dominic LeBlanc - House Leader
- Kevin Lamoureux - Deputy House Leader
- Judy Foote - Whip
- Frank Valeriote - Deputy Whip and Veterans' Affairs
- Francis Scarpaleggia - National Caucus Chair
- Mauril Bélanger - Co-Operatives
- Carolyn Bennett - Aboriginal Affairs
- Scott Brison - Finance
- Gerry Byrne - Treasury Board, Public Works and Government Services
- Sean Casey - Justice
- Irwin Cotler - Rights and Freedoms, International Justice
- Rodger Cuzner - Employment and Social Development, Labour
- Stéphane Dion - Canadian Heritage, Official Languages, Intergovernmental Affairs
- Emmanuel Dubourg - National Revenue
- Kirsty Duncan - Consular Affairs, International Development, Status of Women
- Wayne Easter - Public Safety
- Mark Eyking - Agriculture and Agri-Food
- Chrystia Freeland - International Trade
- Hedy Fry - Health
- Marc Garneau - Foreign Affairs, Francophonie
- Ted Hsu - Science and Technology, Post-Secondary Education, Federal Economic Development Agency for Southern Ontario and Federal Economic Development Initiative in Northern Ontario
- Yvonne Jones - Canadian Northern Economic Development Agency and Northern Development, Arctic Council, Atlantic Canada Opportunities Agency, Search and Rescue
- Lawrence MacAulay - Fisheries and Oceans
- John McCallum - Citizenship and Immigration, Multiculturalism, Seniors
- David McGuinty - Transport, Infrastructure and Communities
- John McKay - Environment
- Joyce Murray - National Defence, Western Economic Diversification
- Geoff Regan - Natural Resources
- Judy Sgro - Industry
- Scott Simms - Democratic Reform and Citizen Services
- Lise St-Denis - Early Learning and Childcare

== See also ==
- Cabinet of Canada
- Shadow Cabinet
- Bloc Québécois Shadow Cabinet
