= Bloc Québécois Shadow Cabinet of the 44th Parliament of Canada =

Bloc Québécois Shadow Cabinet of the 44th Canadian Parliament
- Third party of the House of Commons
- Date formed: October 5, 2021
- Date dissolved: March 23, 2025

People and organizations
- Party Leader: Yves-François Blanchet
- House Leader: Alain Therrien
- Whip: Claude DeBellefeuille
- Member party: Bloc Québécois
- Status in legislature: Opposition 33 / 338

History
- Election: 2021
- Legislature term: 44th Parliament of Canada

This is a list of members of the Bloc Québécois Shadow Cabinet of the 44th Canadian Parliament.

== Members ==
The shadow cabinet was named following the 2021 Canadian federal election:

- Yves-François Blanchet (Beloeil—Chambly): Leader of the Bloc
- Claude DeBellefeuille (Salaberry—Suroît): Whip
- Alain Therrien (La Prairie): House leader, democratic institutions, single tax returns
- Marie-Hélène Gaudreau (Laurentides—Labelle): Caucus chair
- Xavier Barsalou-Duval (Pierre-Boucher—Les Patriotes—Verchères): Transport, infrastructure and communities
- Mario Beaulieu (La-Pointe-de-l’Île): Official languages (francophones outside Quebec), Court Challenges Program
- Stéphane Bergeron (Montarville): Foreign affairs and international development, international cooperation, Canada-China relations
- Sylvie Bérubé (Abitibi–Baie-James–Nunavik–Eeyou): Families, children and social development
- Maxime Blanchette-Joncas (Rimouski-Neigette–Témiscouata–Les Basques): St. Lawrence Seaway, science and innovation
- Alexis Brunelle-Duceppe (Lac-Saint-Jean): Immigration, refugees and citizenship, human rights
- Louise Chabot (Thérèse-De Blainville): Human resources, skills development, social development and people with disabilities
- Martin Champoux (Drummond): Heritage, arts and culture, secularism, Quebec values and vivre-ensemble
- Caroline Desbiens (Beauport—Côte-de-Beaupré—Île d’Orléans—Charlevoix): Fisheries and oceans and Coast Guard
- Luc Desilets (Rivière-des-Mille-Îles): Veterans
- Rhéal Fortin (Rivière-du-Nord): Justice
- Jean-Denis Garon (Mirabel): National revenue, green finance and “green equalization”
- Marilène Gill (Manicouagan): Deputy whip, Indigenous and northern affairs
- Andréanne Larouche (Shefford): Seniors, Status of Women, gender equality
- Sébastien Lemire (Abitibi—Témiscamingue): Industry, high-speed internet in regions, entrepreneurship
- Kristina Michaud (Avignon—La Mitis—Matane—Matapédia): Climate change, youth, public safety and emergency preparedness
- Christine Normandin (Saint-Jean): Deputy leader, national defence
- Patrick O’Hara (Châteauguay—Lacolle): Sports (note: a judicial recount had Liberal MP Brenda Shanahan defeat O'Hara by just 12 votes)
- Monique Pauzé (Repentigny): Environment, sustainable development
- Yves Perron (Berthier—Maskinongé): Agriculture, agri-food, supply management
- Louis Plamondon (Bécancour—Nicolet—Saurel): Library of Parliament committee, caucus vice-chair
- Simon-Pierre Savard-Tremblay (Saint-Hyacinthe—Bagot): International trade, aerospace and cars
- Nathalie Sinclair-Desgagné (Terrebonne): Public finances and pandemic programs, Canada Economic Development for Quebec Regions
- Mario Simard (Jonquière): Intergovernmental affairs, natural resources, energy
- Gabriel Ste-Marie (Joliette): Finance, Treasury Board
- Luc Thériault (Montcalm): Health, medical aid in dying, drug licensing
- Denis Trudel (Longueuil—Saint-Hubert): Social solidarity, French language
- Julie Vignola (Beauport—Limoilou): Public services, procurement, government operations, tourism
- René Villemure (Trois-Rivières): Ethics, protection of personal information, access to information, international francophonie
