= Pat Kelly (politician) =

Canadian politician

Pat Kelly MP
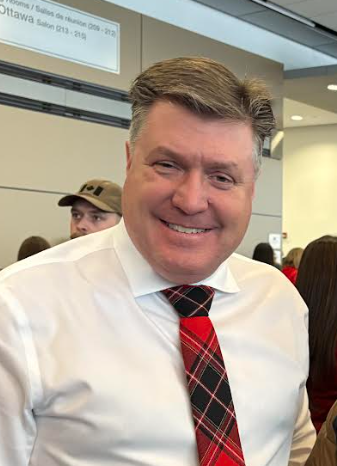
- Kelly in 2025

Member of Parliament for Calgary Crowfoot (Calgary Rocky Ridge; 2015–2025)
- Incumbent
- Assumed office October 19, 2015
- Preceded by: district created

Personal details
- Born: 1971 (age 54–55)
- Party: Conservative
- Profession: Mortgage Broker

Patrick R. Kelly (born 1971) is a Canadian politician, who was elected to represent the riding of Calgary Rocky Ridge in the House of Commons in the 2015 federal election defeating well known broadcast journalist Nirmala Naidoo. A native Calgarian and graduate of Bowness High School and the University of Calgary, Kelly worked as a mortgage broker until his election in 2015. He is married and has three daughters.

== Electoral record ==
2025 Canadian federal election: Calgary Crowfoot
Party	Candidate	Votes	%	±%	Expenditures
Conservative	Pat Kelly	39,971	58.84	+3.90	$47,889.47
Liberal	Shahnaz Munir	25,386	37.37	+15.68	$49,179.62
New Democratic	Jim Samuelson	1,741	2.56	–13.62	$861.35
People's	Yvonne Snyder	360	0.53	–4.10	none listed
Green	Nanette Nerland	346	0.51	–1.17	none listed
Independent	Lachlan Van Egmond	131	0.19	–	none listed
Total valid votes/expense limit		67,935	99.48	–	$136,709.21
Total rejected ballots		358	0.52	–0.07	
Turnout		68,293	73.94	+7.70	
Eligible voters		92,358			
Conservative hold		Swing		–5.89	
Source: Elections Canada

2021 Canadian federal election: Calgary Rocky Ridge
Party	Candidate	Votes	%	±%	Expenditures
Conservative	Pat Kelly	36,034	54.53	–13.77	$41,392.98
Liberal	Shahnaz Munir	14,693	22.23	+3.81	$22,746.05
New Democratic	Jena Dianne Kieren	10,748	16.26	+7.70	$1,017.75
People's	Rory MacLeod	3,003	4.54	+3.05	$3,852.88
Green	Catriona Wright	1,052	1.59	–1.26	$47.98
Maverick	David Robinson	554	0.84	–	$2,422.15
Total valid votes/expense limit		66,084	99.41	–	$126,753.04
Total rejected ballots		390	0.59	+0.19	
Turnout		66,474	66.24	–5.60	
Eligible voters		100,354			
Conservative hold		Swing		–8.79	
Source: Elections Canada

2019 Canadian federal election: Calgary Rocky Ridge
Party	Candidate	Votes	%	±%	Expenditures
Conservative	Pat Kelly	48,253	68.30	+7.90	$53,990.39
Liberal	Todd Kathol	13,012	18.42	–13.24	$33,215.37
New Democratic	Nathan LeBlanc Fortin	6,051	8.56	+2.77	none listed
Green	Catriona Wright	2,011	2.85	+0.70	$4,625.33
People's	Tyler Poulin	1,053	1.49	–	none listed
Independent	Shaoli Wang	270	0.38	–	none listed
Total valid votes/expense limit		70,650	99.60	–	$121,590.97
Total rejected ballots		284	0.40	+0.14	
Turnout		70,934	71.84	–0.27	
Eligible voters		98,738			
Conservative hold		Swing		+10.57	
Source: Elections Canada

2015 Canadian federal election: Calgary Rocky Ridge
Party	Candidate	Votes	%	±%	Expenditures
Conservative	Pat Kelly	38,229	60.40	–8.12	$91,014.33
Liberal	Nirmala Naidoo	20,038	31.66	+19.01	$42,532.38
New Democratic	Stephanie Kot	3,665	5.79	–5.68	$6,715.72
Green	Catriona Wright	1,360	2.15	–5.10	$4,178.50
Total valid votes/expense limit		63,292	99.74	–	$226,211.83
Total rejected ballots		167	0.26	–	
Turnout		63,459	72.11	–	
Eligible voters		88,007			
Conservative hold		Swing		–13.56	
Source: Elections Canada
