= Caucus chair =

Person who chairs the meetings of a caucus

A caucus chair is a person who chairs the meetings of a caucus. Often, the caucus chair is assigned other duties as well.

== Canada ==
In Canada, the elected members of each party in Parliament, including senators, or a provincial legislature, elect among themselves a caucus chair who presides over their meetings. This person is an important figure when the party is in opposition and an important link between cabinet and the backbench when the party is in government.

== United States ==
In common U.S. Congressional Republican caucus legislative usage, the caucus chairman is styled conference chairman and is outranked by the Speaker or Senate President pro-tempore, and the leader or whip of his party.

The duties of a caucus chairman depend upon the political party caucus. In the Republican Conference in the U.S. House of Representatives, for instance, the caucus chairman is in charge of coordinating the party's overall message.

The position of caucus chairman may or may not lead to higher office. Republican conference chair John Anderson and Democratic Caucus Chair Richard Gephardt unsuccessfully sought their party's Presidential nominations in 1980 and 1988 respectively. Anderson took his following and ran as a third party presidential candidate the same year, and never again achieved national prominence as a Republican. Gephardt though was elected as the Democratic leader of the House of Representatives in 1989, and stayed in that position through 2002, before stepping down to run unsuccessfully for the Democratic nomination for President again in 2004. Gephardt helped nominate John Kerry by promptly endorsing him after Kerry defeated him in the Iowa caucuses.

Many state legislative bodies have caucus chairmen for both party caucuses in the House and in the Senate. The duties of the caucus chairman, as with the federal government, depend on the decisions of the caucus. The number of times each caucus meets, the role of each caucus in aiding legislative decision-making, the interrelationships with other caucus leaders and memberships, the assignment of political and institutional duties, all vary in accordance with local traditions and personalities.

Caucuses do not always function well. In Congress in the 1950s, for instance, the House Democratic Caucus met so infrequently that insurgent Democrats formed the House Democratic Study Group, led by Rep. Eugene J. McCarthy, later a U.S. Senator and Presidential candidate, to do the work of reviewing legislation now generally done by caucuses under the direction of the caucus chairmen.

Caucuses have zealously guarded their prerogatives from the executive branch. When outgoing Senate Majority Leader Lyndon B. Johnson became Vice-President, the President of the Senate, he suggested that his duties should include presiding over the Senate Democratic Caucus. Senate Democratic Caucus members generated enough opposition, to what they perceived as executive branch intrusion, that Johnson dropped his idea.
