= Opposition House Leader =

Canadian politician

Leader of the Official Opposition in the House of Commons
- Leader à la Chambre des communes de l'opposition officielle
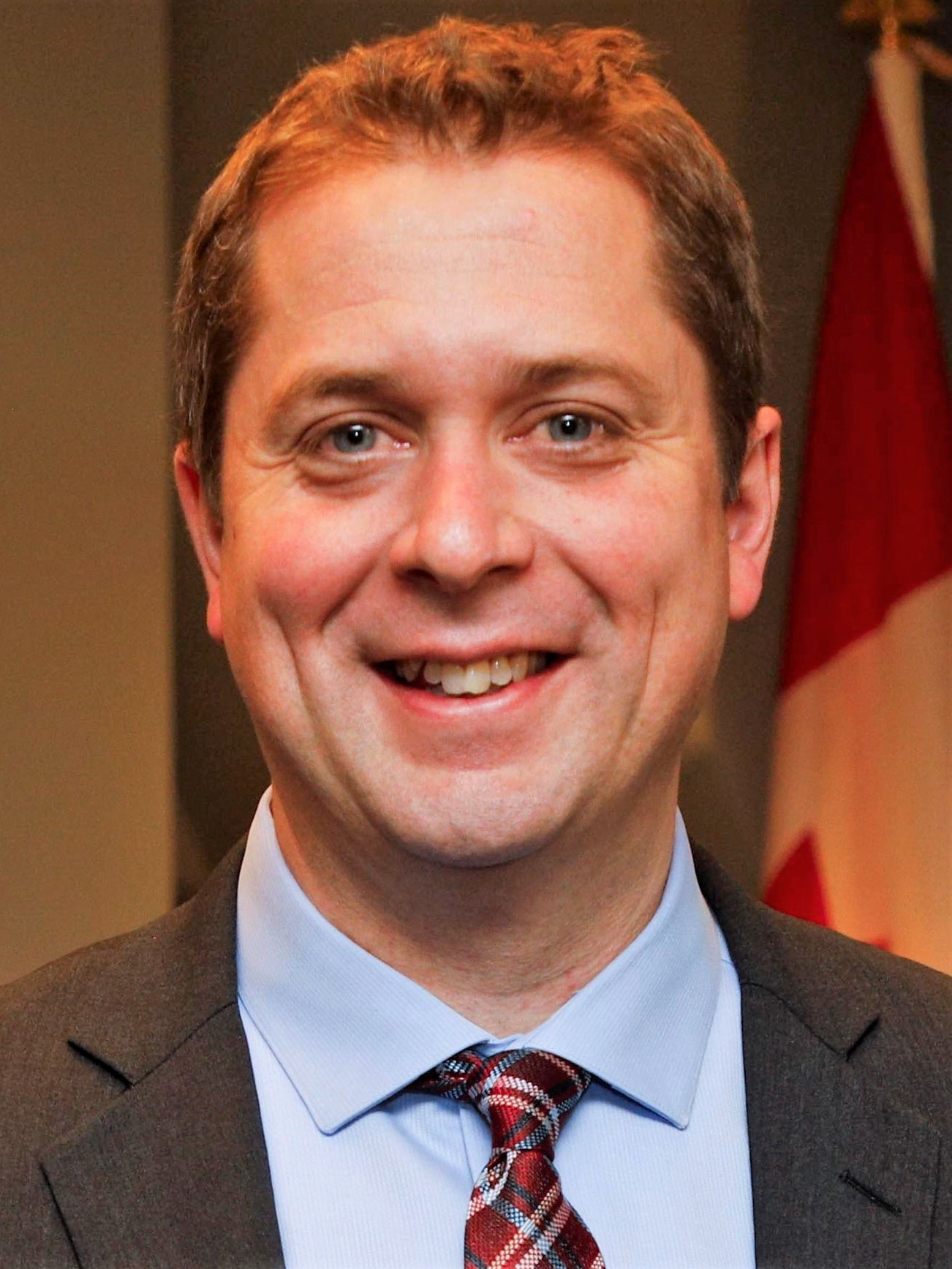
- Incumbent; Andrew Scheer since September 13, 2022
- Member of: House of Commons of Canada; Official Opposition Shadow Cabinet
- Appointer: Leader of the Official Opposition
- Inaugural holder: Lionel Chevrier
- Formation: October 14, 1957
- Salary: $253,200 (2024)

The Opposition House Leader (French: Leader à la Chambre de l'opposition), officially known as leader of the Official Opposition in the House of Commons of Canada, is a member of the Official Opposition, not to be confused with the Leader of the Official Opposition, but is generally a senior member of the frontbench. The House Leader is responsible for questioning the Government House Leader on the forthcoming business of the House of Commons, negotiating with the Government House Leader and other parties' house leaders on the progress of business in the House, and managing the Official Opposition's business in the House of Commons.

The position of Opposition House Leader evolved in the 1950s as each Opposition party began to designate a particular MP to question the Government House Leader on upcoming House business. The title of Opposition House Leader became official in 1963, and in 1974, a special annual indemnity was attached to the position of House Leader in each of the opposition parties. The House Leader also coordinates the Official Opposition's floor strategy, often with the House leaders of smaller opposition parties. The position is particularly important when there is a minority government, or a government with a slim majority, which may be defeated by a vote of no confidence if all opposition parties work together.

Notable Opposition House leaders include Herb Gray of the Liberal Party (also a Government House Leader) and Erik Nielsen of the Progressive Conservative Party.

Notable House leaders of other recognized parties include New Democratic Party MPs Stanley Knowles, who was the House Leader for the NDP from 1962 to 1981, and Bill Blaikie, who held the same position from 1996 until 2003.

== List of Official Opposition House leaders ==
Portrait	Name Electoral district (Birth–Death)	Term of office		Party	Leader of the opposition
Portrait	Name Electoral district (Birth–Death)	Term start	Term end	Party	Leader of the opposition
	Lionel Chevrier; MP for Laurier (1903–1987)	October 14, 1957	February 5, 1963	Liberal	Louis St. Laurent
	Lionel Chevrier; MP for Laurier (1903–1987)	October 14, 1957	February 5, 1963	Liberal	Lester B. Pearson
	Gordon Churchill; MP for Winnipeg South Centre (1898–1985)	May 16, 1963	April 21, 1965	Progressive Conservative	John Diefenbaker
	Michael Starr; MP for Ontario (1910–2000)	April 22, 1965	April 23, 1968	Progressive Conservative	John Diefenbaker
	Michael Starr; MP for Ontario (1910–2000)	April 22, 1965	April 23, 1968	Progressive Conservative	Robert Stanfield
	Ged Baldwin; MP for Peace River (1907–1991)	July 27, 1968	September 20, 1973	Progressive Conservative	Robert Stanfield
	Thomas Miller Bell; MP for Saint John—Lancaster (1923–1996)	September 21, 1973	May 9, 1974	Progressive Conservative	Robert Stanfield
	Ged Baldwin; MP for Peace River (1907–1991)	August 14, 1974	February 24, 1976	Progressive Conservative	Robert Stanfield
	Walter Baker; MP for Grenville—Carleton (1930–1983)	February 25, 1976	March 26, 1979	Progressive Conservative	Joe Clark
	Allan MacEachen; MP for Cape Breton Highlands—Canso (1921–2017)	October 9, 1979	December 14, 1979	Liberal	Pierre Trudeau
	Walter Baker; MP for Nepean—Carleton (1930–1983)	April 14, 1980	September 8, 1981	Progressive Conservative	Joe Clark
	Erik Nielsen; MP for Yukon (1924–2008)	September 9, 1981	February 8, 1983	Progressive Conservative	Joe Clark
	Doug Lewis; MP for Simcoe North (born 1938)	February 10, 1983	September 6, 1983	Progressive Conservative	Erik Nielsen
	Erik Nielsen; MP for Yukon (1924–2008)	September 7, 1983	April 5, 1984	Progressive Conservative	Brian Mulroney
	Ray Hnatyshyn; MP for Saskatoon West (1934–2002)	April 6, 1984	July 9, 1984	Progressive Conservative	Brian Mulroney
	Herb Gray; MP for Windsor West (1931–2014)	September 18, 1984	February 7, 1990	Liberal	John Turner
	Jean-Robert Gauthier; MP for Ottawa—Vanier (1929–2009)	February 7, 1990	January 29, 1991	Liberal	Herb Gray
	David Dingwall; MP for Cape Breton—East Richmond (born 1952)	January 30, 1991	May 8, 1993	Liberal	Jean Chrétien
	Michel Gauthier; MP for Roberval—Lac-Saint-Jean (1950–2020)	November 10, 1993	February 17, 1996	Bloc Québécois	Lucien Bouchard
	Michel Gauthier; MP for Roberval—Lac-Saint-Jean (1950–2020)	November 10, 1993	February 17, 1996	Bloc Québécois	Gilles Duceppe
	Gilles Duceppe; MP for Laurier—Sainte-Marie (born 1947)	February 17, 1996	March 15, 1997	Bloc Québécois	Michel Gauthier
	Suzanne Tremblay; MP for Rimouski—Témiscouata (1937–2020)	March 17, 1997	April 25, 1997	Bloc Québécois	Gilles Duceppe
	Randy White; MP for Langley—Abbotsford (born 1948)	June 20, 1997	January 30, 2000	Reform	Preston Manning
	Chuck Strahl; MP for Fraser Valley (1957–2024)	January 31, 2000	April 24, 2001	Reform	Preston Manning
	Chuck Strahl; MP for Fraser Valley (1957–2024)	January 31, 2000	April 24, 2001	Canadian Alliance	Preston Manning
	Chuck Strahl; MP for Fraser Valley (1957–2024)	January 31, 2000	April 24, 2001	Canadian Alliance	Deborah Grey
	John Reynolds; MP for West Vancouver—Sunshine Coast (born 1942)	April 24, 2001	December 17, 2001	Canadian Alliance	Stockwell Day
	Randy White; MP for Langley—Abbotsford (born 1948)	December 18, 2001	April 3, 2002	Canadian Alliance	John Reynolds
	John Reynolds; MP for West Vancouver—Sunshine Coast (born 1942)	April 4, 2002	December 22, 2003	Canadian Alliance	Stephen Harper
	Loyola Hearn; MP for St. John's West (born 1943)	January 8, 2004	March 21, 2004	Conservative	Grant Hill
	John Reynolds; MP for West Vancouver—Sunshine Coast (born 1942)	March 22, 2004	January 27, 2005	Conservative	Stephen Harper
	Jay Hill; MP for Prince George—Peace River (born 1952)	January 28, 2005	February 5, 2006	Conservative	Stephen Harper
	Ralph Goodale; MP for Wascana (born 1949)	February 10, 2006	September 6, 2010	Liberal	Bill Graham
	Ralph Goodale; MP for Wascana (born 1949)	February 10, 2006	September 6, 2010	Liberal	Stéphane Dion
	Ralph Goodale; MP for Wascana (born 1949)	February 10, 2006	September 6, 2010	Liberal	Michael Ignatieff
	David McGuinty; MP for Ottawa South (born 1960)	September 7, 2010	March 26, 2011	Liberal	Michael Ignatieff
	Tom Mulcair; MP for Outremont (born 1954)	May 26, 2011	October 12, 2011	New Democratic	Jack Layton
	Tom Mulcair; MP for Outremont (born 1954)	May 26, 2011	October 12, 2011	New Democratic	Nycole Turmel
	Joe Comartin; MP for Windsor—Tecumseh (born 1947)	October 13, 2011	April 19, 2012	New Democratic	Nycole Turmel
	Joe Comartin; MP for Windsor—Tecumseh (born 1947)	October 13, 2011	April 19, 2012	New Democratic	Tom Mulcair
	Nathan Cullen; MP for Skeena—Bulkley Valley (born 1972)	April 20, 2012	March 20, 2014	New Democratic	Tom Mulcair
	Peter Julian; MP for Burnaby—New Westminster (born 1962)	March 24, 2014	October 20, 2015	New Democratic	Tom Mulcair
	Andrew Scheer; MP for Regina—Qu'Appelle (born 1979)	November 18, 2015	September 13, 2016	Conservative	Rona Ambrose
	Candice Bergen; MP for Portage—Lisgar (born 1964)	September 15, 2016	September 2, 2020	Conservative	Rona Ambrose
	Candice Bergen; MP for Portage—Lisgar (born 1964)	September 15, 2016	September 2, 2020	Conservative	Andrew Scheer
	Candice Bergen; MP for Portage—Lisgar (born 1964)	September 15, 2016	September 2, 2020	Conservative	Erin O'Toole
	Gérard Deltell; MP for Louis-Saint-Laurent (born 1964)	September 2, 2020	February 4, 2022	Conservative	Erin O'Toole
	John Brassard; MP for Barrie—Innisfil (born 1964)	February 5, 2022	September 12, 2022	Conservative	Candice Bergen
	Andrew Scheer; MP for Regina—Qu'Appelle (born 1979)	September 13, 2022	Incumbent	Conservative	Pierre Poilievre
	Andrew Scheer; MP for Regina—Qu'Appelle (born 1979)	September 13, 2022	Incumbent	Conservative	Andrew Scheer (Note: Poilievre lost his seat in the 2025 Canadian federal election, and therefore lost his status as leader of the Opposition. A few days later, Scheer was appointed as the parliamentary leader of the Conservative Party, making him the leader of the Opposition, despite Poilievre continuing as party leader. Poilievre returned to Parliament in August 2025.)
	Andrew Scheer; MP for Regina—Qu'Appelle (born 1979)	September 13, 2022	Incumbent	Conservative	Pierre Poilievre

== List of House leaders of other recognized parties ==
=== New Democratic Party ===
- Stanley Knowles 1962–1984
- Ian Deans 1984–1986 (acting 1981–1984)
- Nelson Riis 1986–1994
- Len Taylor 1994–1996
- Bill Blaikie 1996–2003
- Libby Davies 2003–2011
- Official Opposition 2011–2015
- Peter Julian 2015–2016
- Murray Rankin 2016–2018
- Ruth Ellen Brosseau 2018–2019
- Peter Julian 2019–2025
- Alexandre Boulerice 2025–2026
- Heather McPherson 2026–present

=== Social Credit Party ===
- Gilles Caouette 1972–1974
- André-Gilles Fortin 1974–1976
- Charles-Arthur Gauthier 1976–1980

=== Reform Party ===
- Elwin Hermanson 1993–1995
- Raymond Speaker 1995–1997
- Official Opposition after 1997

=== Progressive Conservative Party ===
- Government or Official Opposition before 1993
- None 1993–1997
- Peter MacKay 1997–2002
- Loyola Hearn 2002–2004

=== Bloc Québécois ===
- Official Opposition 1993–1997
- Michel Gauthier 1997–2007
- Pierre Paquette 2007–2011
- Louis Plamondon 2011–2013
- André Bellavance 2013–2014
- Jean-François Fortin 2014
- Louis Plamondon 2014–2015
- Luc Thériault 2015–2018
- Mario Beaulieu 2018
- Luc Thériault 2018–2019
- Alain Therrien 2019–2025
- Christine Normandin 2025–present

=== Liberal Party ===
- Government or Official Opposition before 2011
- Marc Garneau 2011–2012
- Dominic LeBlanc 2012–2015

== See also ==
- Speaker of the House of Commons (Canada)
- Leader of the Government in the House of Commons (Canada)
- Leader of the Official Opposition (Canada)
- Leader of the Opposition in the Senate (Canada)
- Shadow Leader of the House of Commons
