= Minister of labour =

Minister of labour (in British English) or labor (in American English) is typically a cabinet-level position with portfolio responsibility for setting national labour standards, labour dispute mechanisms, employment, workforce participation, training and social security.

== Lists ==
The position exist in many countries with several different names:

- Minister of Labor, Social Affairs, and Equal Opportunities (Albania)
- Minister of Labor, Employment, and Social Security (Argentina)
- Minister of Labour, Family and Youth (Austria)
- Minister of Labor and Social Protection of the Population (Azerbaijan)
- Ministry of Labour (Barbados)
- Ministry of Labour and Employment (Bangladesh)
- Minister of Work, Employment, and Social Security (Bolivia)
- Minister of Labour and Employment (Brazil)
- Minister of Labour (Burma)
- Minister of Labour (Bhutan)
- Minister of Employment, Workforce, and Labour (Canada)
  - Minister of Labour and Immigration (Manitoba)
  - Minister of Labour (Ontario)
  - Minister of Labour (Quebec)
- Minister of Human Resources and Social Security (China)
  - Secretary for Labour and Welfare (Hong Kong)
- Minister of Labour (Colombia)
- Minister of Employment (Denmark)
- Minister of Social Affairs and Employment (Netherlands)
- Minister of Labour (Germany)
- Minister of Labour and Employment (India)
- Minister of Manpower (Indonesia)
- Minister of Cooperatives, Labour and Social Welfare (Iran)
- Minister for Labour (Ireland, dissolved)
- Minister of Labor, Social Affairs and Social Services (Israel)
- Minister of Health, Labour, and Welfare (Japan)
- Minister of Social Security and Labour (Lithuania)
- Minister of Labor and Social Policy (Macedonia)
- Minister of Human Resources (Malaysia)
- Secretary of Labor (Mexico)
- Minister of Labor, Family, and Social Protection (Moldova)
- Minister of Labour, Employment and Social Security (Nepal)
- Minister of Labour (New Zealand)
- Minister of Labour and Productivity (Nigeria)
- Minister of Labor (North Korea)
- Minister of Labour and Social Inclusion (Norway)
- Secretary of Labor and Employment (Philippines)
- Minister of Labor, Family, and Social Protection (Romania)
- Minister of Manpower (Singapore)
- Minister of Employment (Sweden)
- Ministry of Labor (Taiwan)
- Ministry of Labour (Thailand)
- Minister of Labour and Social Security (Turkey)
- Minister of Social Policy (Ukraine)
- Secretary of State for Employment (United Kingdom)
  - Minister of Labour (Northern Ireland)
- Secretary of Labor (United States)
- Ministry of Labour, Invalids and Social Affairs (Vietnam)
