= Minister of Public Safety =

Canadian federal cabinet minister

- Ministre de la Sécurité publique
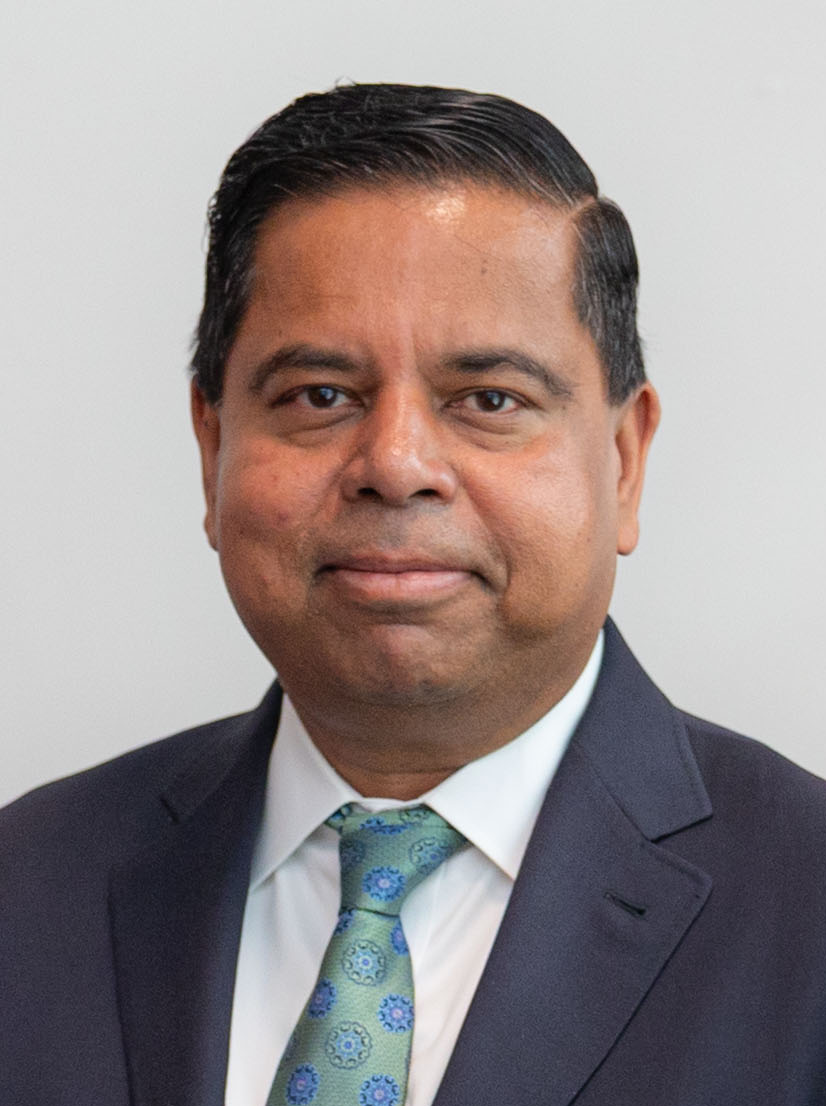
- Incumbent; Gary Anandasangaree since May 13, 2025
- Public Safety Canada
- Style: The Honourable
- Member of: House of Commons; Privy Council; Cabinet
- Reports to: Parliament; Prime Minister
- Appointer: Monarch (represented by the governor general); on the advice of the prime minister
- Term length: At His Majesty's pleasure
- Precursor: Solicitor General of Canada
- Inaugural holder: Anne McLellan
- Formation: December 12, 2003
- Salary: CA$299,900 (2024)
- Website: www.publicsafety.gc.ca

The minister of public safety (French: ministre de la Sécurité publique) is the minister of the Crown responsible for Public Safety Canada and a member of the Cabinet of Canada. The portfolio succeeded the role of Solicitor General of Canada in 2005.

Gary Anandasangaree has been the incumbent minister since May 13, 2025.

== Role and history ==
The position was nominally created in December 2003 as a successor to the previous position of solicitor general, with the official title of Solicitor General carrying over during the 27th Canadian Ministry. The minister is the head of the Department of Public Safety and Emergency Preparedness, the internal security and border security department of the Government of Canada, which is also responsible for the Emergency Management Act. It incorporated the responsibilities associated with the solicitor general, including responsibility for the Correctional Service of Canada, the Royal Canadian Mounted Police, the Parole Board of Canada, and the Canadian Security Intelligence Service. The portfolio also assumed responsibility for the Canada Border Services Agency upon that agency's formation in December 2003. The title of Solicitor General was abolished in 2005 and formally replaced in relevant laws with the present title.

== List of ministers ==
Key:

Liberal Party of Canada
Conservative Party of Canada

No.	Portrait	Name	Term of office		Political party	Ministry
Solicitor General
1		Anne McLellan	December 12, 2003	April 3, 2005	Liberal	27 (Martin)
Minister of Public Safety and Emergency Preparedness
–		Anne McLellan	April 4, 2005	February 5, 2006	Liberal	27 (Martin)
Minister of Public Safety
2		Stockwell Day	February 6, 2006	October 30, 2008	Conservative	28 (Harper)
3		Peter Van Loan	October 30, 2008	January 19, 2010	Conservative	28 (Harper)
4		Vic Toews	January 19, 2010	July 9, 2013	Conservative	28 (Harper)
Minister of Public Safety and Emergency Preparedness
5		Steven Blaney	July 15, 2013	November 4, 2015	Conservative	28 (Harper)
6		Ralph Goodale	November 4, 2015	November 20, 2019	Liberal	29 (J. Trudeau)
7		Bill Blair	November 20, 2019	October 26, 2021	Liberal	29 (J. Trudeau)
Minister of Public Safety						29 (J. Trudeau)
8		Marco Mendicino	October 26, 2021	July 26, 2023	Liberal	29 (J. Trudeau)
Minister of Public Safety, Democratic Institutions and Intergovernmental Affairs
9		Dominic LeBlanc	July 26, 2023	December 20, 2024	Liberal	29 (J. Trudeau)
Minister of Public Safety
10		David McGuinty	December 20, 2024	March 14, 2025	Liberal	29 (J. Trudeau)
Minister of Public Safety and Emergency Preparedness
(10)		David McGuinty	March 14, 2025	May 13, 2025	Liberal	30 (Carney)
Minister of Public Safety
11		Gary Anandasangaree	May 13, 2025	present	Liberal	30 (Carney)

=== Minister of Emergency Preparedness ===
From 2021 to 2025, the position was divided into two portfolios, with the emergency preparedness portfolio being given to a new Minister of Emergency Preparedness. The two portfolios were consolidated on March 14, 2025, at the start of the 30th Canadian Ministry. It was re-established as Minister of Emergency Management and Community Resilience on May 13, 2025.

No.	Portrait	Name	Term of office		Political party	Ministry
Minister of Emergency Preparedness
1		Bill Blair	October 26, 2021	July 26, 2023	Liberal	29 (J. Trudeau)
2		Harjit Sajjan	July 26, 2023	March 14, 2025	Liberal	29 (J. Trudeau)
Minister of Emergency Management and Community Resilience
3		Eleanor Olszewski	May 13, 2025	present	Liberal	30 (Carney)

=== Associate Minister of Public Safety ===
On December 20, 2024, an Associate Minister of Public Safety was appointed to assist the minister of public safety; the position was abolished on March 14, 2025.

No.	Portrait	Name	Term of office		Political party	Ministry
Associate Minister of Public Safety
1		Rachel Bendayan	December 20, 2024	March 14, 2025	Liberal	29 (J. Trudeau)

=== Secretary of State (Combatting Crime) ===
No.	Portrait	Name	Term of office		Political party	Ministry
Secretary of State (Combatting Crime)
1		Ruby Sahota	May 13, 2025	Incumbent	Liberal	30 (Carney)

== See also ==
- Minister of Justice and Attorney General of Canada
