= House leader =

Canadian political office

In Canada, each political party with representation in the House of Commons has a House leader who is a front bench member of Parliament (MP) and an expert in parliamentary procedure. The same representation is found in the provincial and territorial legislatures. The House leader is in charge of the party's day-to-day business in the House of Commons of Canada (or provincial or territorial legislatures), and usually conducts negotiations with other parties on the conduct of bills and debates.

They also argue points of order before the speaker of the House. The "House leader" is not the same as the party leader, but is the leader's senior deputy for House business in Opposition parties, including the Official Opposition. The government House leader is a senior Cabinet minister who navigates the government's business in the House. This system is replicated in the various provincial legislatures. The position of House Leader is especially important during periods of minority government where no one party has control of the House and bills can only be passed with the agreement of multiple parties.

The prime minister of Canada and leader of the Official Opposition originally had these responsibilities. In 1944, however, as a result of the increasing burdens placed on government by the Second World War, Prime Minister William Lyon Mackenzie King delegated these responsibilities to another member of the Canadian Cabinet. In 1946, the position of government House leader was formally recognized.

The position of Opposition House leader evolved in the 1950s as each opposition party began to designate a particular MP to question the government House leader on upcoming House business. The title of Opposition House leader became official in 1963, and in 1974, a special annual indemnity was attached to the position of House leader in each of the opposition parties.

Notable Opposition House leaders include Stanley Knowles of the New Democratic Party and its predecessor, the Cooperative Commonwealth Federation; Herb Gray of the Liberal Party (also a government House leader); and Erik Nielsen of the Progressive Conservative Party.

The Office of House Leader has also been instituted at the provincial level, in the provincial legislative assemblies.

The term House leader has also been used to describe a party's parliamentary leader, who leads a political party in the House of Commons or a provincial legislature due to there either not being a party leader or the party leader not having a seat. At other times, if there is no party leader or the party leader has no seat, the parliamentary leader and house leader may be separate positions.

== Current house leaders ==
Name	Portrait	Term
Steven MacKinnon (Liberal)		13 May 2025 – present
Andrew Scheer (Conservative)		13 September 2022 – present
Christine Normandin (Bloc Québécois)		29 April 2025 – present
Heather McPherson (New Democratic)		10 April 2026 – present
Source (Parliament of Canada)

== See also ==
- Leader of the Government in the House of Commons (Canada)
- Leader of the Opposition in the House of Commons
- Leader of the House of Commons
- Floor Leader
- Deputy leader
