= Official Opposition Shadow Cabinet of the 42nd Parliament of Canada =

2015–2019 opposition political group

- Shadow Cabinet of Canada

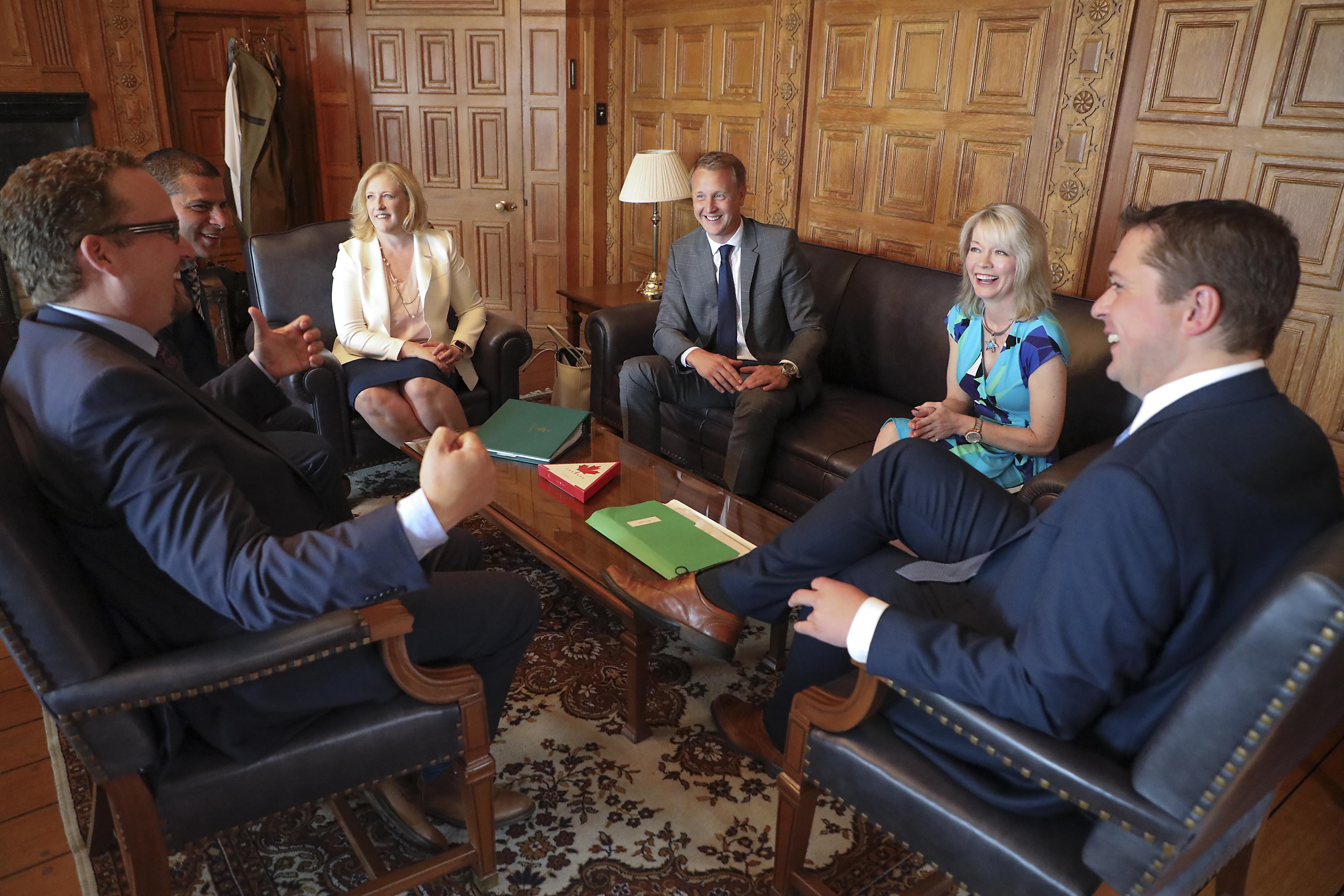
- Date formed: November 4, 2015

People and organizations
- Head of state: Queen Elizabeth II
- Opposition party: Conservative Party of Canada
- Opposition leader: Rona Ambrose (2015–2017); Andrew Scheer (2017–2019)

History
- Election: 2015
- Legislature term: 42nd Canadian Parliament
- Predecessor: 41st (2011–2015)
- Successor: 43rd (2019–2021)

The Official Opposition Shadow Cabinet in Canada is composed of Members of Parliament of the main Opposition party responsible for holding the Government to account and for developing and disseminating the party's policy positions. Members of the Official Opposition are generally referred to as Opposition Critics, but the term Shadow Minister (which is generally used in other Westminster systems) is also used. The Conservative Party of Canada served as the Official Opposition in the 42nd Parliament.

== By Member ==
82 MPs have served in the Official Opposition Cabinet in the 42nd Parliament. 35 MPs are currently Senior Shadow Ministers. Highlight indicates that a Member is a current Senior Shadow Minister. Of the senior members of Shadow Cabinet, 24 are men and 11 are women. 6 are visible minorities.

| Portrait | Shadow Minister | Portfolio | Tenure |
|---|---|---|---|
| | Ziad Aboultaif | National Revenue | November 20, 2015 — August 29, 2017 |
| | Ziad Aboultaif | International Development | August 30, 2017 — October 21, 2019 |
| | Dan Albas | Interprovincial Trade | November 20, 2015 — October 15, 2016 |
| | Dan Albas | Deputy Finance | October 16, 2016 — August 29, 2017 |
| | Dan Albas | Small Business | August 30, 2017 — September 6, 2018 |
| | Dan Albas | Innovation, Science & Economic Development | September 7, 2018 — October 21, 2019 |
| | Leona Alleslev | Border Security | September 17, 2018 — October 21, 2019 |
| | Dean Allison | Deputy International Development | November 20, 2015 — July 12, 2016 |
| | Dean Allison | International Development | July 13, 2016 — August 29, 2017 |
| | Dean Allison | International Trade | August 30, 2017 — October 21, 2019 |
| | Rona Ambrose | Leader of the Conservative Party | November 5, 2015 — May 27, 2017 |
| | Rona Ambrose | Leader of the Opposition | November 5, 2015 — May 27, 2017 |
| | Rona Ambrose | Status of Women | November 20, 2015 — August 29, 2017 |
| | David Anderson | Human Rights & Religious Freedom | November 20, 2015 — October 21, 2019 |
| | David Anderson | Agriculture | September 15, 2016 — August 29, 2017 |
| | Mel Arnold | Deputy Fisheries & Oceans | November 20, 2015 — October 21, 2019 |
| | John Barlow | Deputy Employment, Labour & Workforce Development | November 20, 2015 — October 15, 2016 |
| | John Barlow | Interprovincial Trade | October 16, 2016 — August 29, 2017 |
| | John Barlow | Deputy Agriculture | August 30, 2017 — October 21, 2019 |
| | John Barlow | Employment, Labour & Workforce Development | September 7, 2018 — October 21, 2019 |
| | Candice Bergen | Natural Resources | November 20, 2015 — September 14, 2016 |
| | Candice Bergen | Opposition House Leader | September 15, 2016 — October 21, 2019 |
| | Luc Berthold | Deputy Infrastructure & Communities | November 20, 2015 — October 15, 2016 |
| | Luc Berthold | Deputy Transportation | October 16, 2016 — August 29, 2017 |
| | Luc Berthold | Agriculture | August 30, 2017 — October 21, 2019 |
| | James Bezan | National Defence | November 20, 2015 — October 21, 2019 |
| | Maxime Bernier | Innovation, Science, & Economic Development | November 20, 2015 — April 7, 2016 |
| | Maxime Bernier | Innovation, Science, & Economic Development | August 30, 2017 — June 12, 2018 |
| | Steven Blaney | Public Services & Procurement | November 20, 2015 — October 15, 2016 |
| | Steven Blaney | Veterans Affairs | August 30, 2017 — September 24, 2017 |
| | Steven Blaney | Employment, Labour & Workforce Development | September 25, 2017 — September 6, 2018 |
| | Steven Blaney | Canadian Heritage | September 7, 2018 — October 21, 2019 |
| | Steven Blaney | La Francophonie & Official Languages | September 7, 2018 — October 21, 2019 |
| | Kelly Block | Transportation | November 20, 2015 — October 21, 2019 |
| | Sylvie Boucher | La Francophonie & Official Languages | November 20, 2015 — August 29, 2017 |
| | Sylvie Boucher | Rural Affairs | August 30, 2017 — October 21, 2019 |
| | Sylvie Boucher | Economic Development (Quebec) | August 30, 2017 — October 21, 2019 |
| | John Brassard | Urban Affairs | November 20, 2015 — October 15, 2016 |
| | John Brassard | Veterans Affairs | October 16, 2016 — August 29, 2017 |
| | John Brassard | Deputy Chief Opposition Whip | August 30, 2017 — October 21, 2019 |
| | Gord Brown | Chief Opposition Whip | November 20, 2015 — July 19, 2017 |
| | Gord Brown | Deputy National Defence | August 30, 2017 — May 2, 2018 |
| | Colin Carrie | Deputy Health | November 20, 2015 — April 7, 2016 |
| | Colin Carrie | Health | April 8, 2016 — August 29, 2017 |
| | Colin Carrie | Canada-US Relations | August 30, 2017 — October 21, 2019 |
| | Colin Carrie | Economic Development (S. Ontario) | August 30, 2017 — October 21, 2019 |
| | Michael Chong | Deputy Environment | November 20, 2015 — May 16, 2016 |
| | Michael Chong | Infrastructure & Communities | August 30, 2017 — September 6, 2018 |
| | Michael Chong | Urban Affairs | August 30, 2017 — September 6, 2018 |
| | Michael Chong | Science | September 7, 2018 — October 21, 2019 |
| | Alupa Clarke | Veterans Affairs | November 20, 2015 — October 15, 2016 |
| | Alupa Clarke | Public Services | October 16, 2016 — August 29, 2017 |
| | Alupa Clarke | La Francophonie & Official Languages | August 30, 2017 — September 6, 2018 |
| | Alupa Clarke | Deputy International Trade | August 30, 2017 — October 21, 2019 |
| | Tony Clement | Foreign Affairs | November 20, 2015 — July 12, 2016 |
| | Tony Clement | Public Safety | October 16, 2016 — August 29, 2017 |
| | Tony Clement | Public Services | August 30, 2017 — October 21, 2019 |
| | Tony Clement | Justice | September 7, 2018 — October 21, 2019 |
| | Michael Cooper | Deputy Justice | November 20, 2015 — October 21, 2019 |
| | Gérard Deltell | Employment, Labour & Workforce Development | November 20, 2015 — October 15, 2016 |
| | Gérard Deltell | Finance | October 16, 2016 — August 29, 2017 |
| | Gérard Deltell | Treasury Board | August 30, 2017 — October 21, 2019 |
| | Kerry Diotte | Deputy Urban Affairs | November 20, 2015 — August 29, 2017 |
| | Kerry Diotte | Deputy Public Services & Procurement | August 30, 2017 — October 21, 2019 |
| | Todd Doherty | Asia-Pacific Gateway | November 20, 2015 — October 21, 2019 |
| | Todd Doherty | Deputy Indigenous Affairs | November 20, 2015 — August 29, 2017 |
| | Todd Doherty | Fisheries and Oceans | September 15, 2016 — October 21, 2019 |
| | Ted Falk | Deputy Employment, Labour & Workforce Development | September 25, 2017 — October 21, 2019 |
| | Ed Fast | Environment & Climate Change | November 20, 2015 — October 21, 2019 |
| | Diane Finley | Deputy Innovation, Science & Economic Development | November 20, 2015 — April 7, 2016 |
| | Diane Finley | Innovation, Science & Economic Development | April 8, 2016 — August 29, 2017 |
| | Cheryl Gallant | Economic Development (Northern Ontario) | November 20, 2015 — August 29, 2017 |
| | Bernard Généreux | Official Languages | November 20, 2015 — October 15, 2016 |
| | Bernard Généreux | Deputy La Francophonie | November 20, 2015 — October 15, 2016 |
| | Bernard Généreux | Economic Development (Quebec) | October 16, 2016 — August 29, 2017 |
| | Garnett Genuis | Deputy Human Rights & Religious Freedom | November 20, 2015 — August 29, 2017 |
| | Garnett Genuis | Deputy Foreign Affairs | August 30, 2017 — October 21, 2019 |
| | Marilyn Gladu | Science | November 20, 2015 — August 29, 2017 |
| | Marilyn Gladu | Health | August 30, 2017 — October 21, 2019 |
| | Joël Godin | Economic Development (Quebec) | November 20, 2015 — October 15, 2016 |
| | Joël Godin | Deputy Environment | May 17, 2016 — August 29, 2017 |
| | Joël Godin | Deputy Infrastructure & Communities | August 30, 2017 — October 21, 2019 |
| | Jacques Gourde | Deputy Agriculture | November 20, 2015 — August 29, 2017 |
| | Jacques Gourde | Deputy Ethics | August 30, 2017 — October 21, 2019 |
| | Rachael Harder | Youth | November 20, 2015 — August 29, 2017 |
| | Rachael Harder | Persons with Disabilities | November 20, 2015 — August 29, 2017 |
| | Rachael Harder | Deputy Health | April 8, 2016 — August 29, 2017 |
| | Rachael Harder | Status of Women | August 30, 2017 — October 21, 2019 |
| | Matt Jeneroux | Western Economic Diversification | November 20, 2015 — August 29, 2017 |
| | Matt Jeneroux | Science | August 30, 2017 — September 6, 2018 |
| | Matt Jeneroux | Innovation, Science & Economic Development | June 13, 2018 — September 6, 2018 |
| | Matt Jeneroux | Infrastructure, Communities & Urban Affairs | September 7, 2018 — October 21, 2019 |
| | Pat Kelly | Deputy Treasury Board | November 20, 2015 — August 29, 2017 |
| | Pat Kelly | National Revenue | August 30, 2017 — October 21, 2019 |
| | Peter Kent | Consular Affairs | November 20, 2015 — August 29, 2017 |
| | Peter Kent | Deputy Foreign Affairs | November 20, 2015 — July 12, 2016 |
| | Peter Kent | Foreign Affairs | July 13, 2016 — August 29, 2017 |
| | Peter Kent | Ethics | August 30, 2017 — October 21, 2019 |
| | Robert Kitchen | Sport | November 20, 2015 — August 29, 2017 |
| | Robert Kitchen | Deputy Sport & Disabilities | August 30, 2017 — October 21, 2019 |
| | Robert Kitchen | Deputy Youth | August 30, 2017 — October 21, 2019 |
| | Tom Kmiec | Deputy Foreign Affairs | October 16, 2016 — August 29, 2017 |
| | Tom Kmiec | Deputy Finance | August 30, 2017 — October 21, 2019 |
| | Stephanie Kusie | Deputy Health | August 30, 2017 — October 21, 2019 |
| | Stephanie Kusie | Democratic Institutions | September 7, 2018 — October 21, 2019 |
| | Mike Lake | Newborn & Maternal Health | November 20, 2015 — August 29, 2017 |
| | Mike Lake | Deputy International Development | August 30, 2017 — October 21, 2019 |
| | Denis Lebel | Conservative Party Deputy Leader | November 20, 2015 — July 19, 2017 |
| | Denis Lebel | Deputy Leader of the Opposition | November 20, 2015 — July 19, 2017 |
| | Denis Lebel | Intergovernmental Affairs | November 20, 2015 — August 29, 2017 |
| | Kellie Leitch | Health | November 20, 2015 — April 7, 2016 |
| | Ben Lobb | Deputy Transportation | August 30, 2017 — October 21, 2019 |
| | Tom Lukiwski | Western Economic Diversification | August 30, 2017 — October 21, 2019 |
| | Richard Martel | Deputy National Defence | September 7, 2018 — October 21, 2019 |
| | Kelly McCauley | Deputy Public Services | November 20, 2015 — August 29, 2017 |
| | Phil McColeman | Deputy Finance | November 20, 2015 — October 15, 2016 |
| | Phil McColeman | Treasury Board | October 16, 2016 — August 29, 2017 |
| | Phil McColeman | Deputy Employment, Labour & Workforce Development | August 30, 2017 — September 24, 2017 |
| | Phil McColeman | Veterans Affairs | September 25, 2017 — October 21, 2019 |
| | Cathy McLeod | Indigenous Affairs | November 20, 2015 — August 29, 2017 |
| | Cathy McLeod | Indigenous Relations | August 30, 2017 — October 21, 2019 |
| | Cathy McLeod | Indigenous Services | August 30, 2017 — October 21, 2019 |
| | Cathy McLeod | Economic Development (The North) | August 30, 2017 — October 21, 2019 |
| | Larry Miller | Deputy Public Safety & Emergency Preparedness | July 13, 2016 — August 29, 2017 |
| | Glen Motz | Deputy Public Safety & Emergency Preparedness | August 30, 2017 — October 21, 2019 |
| | John Nater | Shared Economy | August 30, 2017 — October 21, 2019 |
| | John Nater | Interprovincial Trade | August 30, 2017 — October 21, 2019 |
| | Rob Nicholson | Justice | November 20, 2015 — October 21, 2019 |
| | Rob Nicholson | Public Services | September 7, 2018 — October 21, 2019 |
| | Alex Nuttall | Economic Development (Southern Ontario) | November 20, 2015 — August 29, 2017 |
| | Alex Nuttall | Shared Economy | April 8, 2016 — August 29, 2017 |
| | Alex Nuttall | Deputy Innovation, Science & Economic Development | April 8, 2016 — August 29, 2017 |
| | Alex Nuttall | Sport & Disabilities | August 30, 2017 — October 21, 2019 |
| | Alex Nuttall | Youth | August 30, 2017 — October 21, 2019 |
| | Deepak Obhrai | International Development | November 20, 2015 — July 12, 2016 |
| | Erin O'Toole | Public Safety & Emergency Preparedness | November 20, 2015 — October 15, 2016 |
| | Erin O'Toole | Foreign Affairs | August 30, 2017 — October 21, 2019 |
| | Pierre Paul-Hus | Military Procurement | November 20, 2015 — August 29, 2017 |
| | Pierre Paul-Hus | Deputy National Defence | November 20, 2015 — August 29, 2017 |
| | Pierre Paul-Hus | Public Safety & Emergency Preparedness | August 30, 2017 — October 21, 2019 |
| | Pierre Poilievre | Treasury Board | November 20, 2015 — October 15, 2016 |
| | Pierre Poilievre | Employment, Labour & Work Opportunity | October 16, 2016 — August 29, 2017 |
| | Pierre Poilievre | Finance | August 30, 2017 — October 21, 2019 |
| | Lisa Raitt | Finance | November 20, 2015 — October 15, 2016 |
| | Lisa Raitt | Conservative Party Deputy Leader | July 20, 2017 — October 21, 2019 |
| | Lisa Raitt | Deputy Leader of the Opposition | July 20, 2017 — October 21, 2019 |
| | Alain Rayes | Deputy Public Safety & Emergency Preparedness | November 20, 2015 — July 12, 2016 |
| | Alain Rayes | Deputy Foreign Affairs | July 13, 2016 — October 15, 2016 |
| | Alain Rayes | Deputy Infrastructure | October 16, 2016 — August 29, 2017 |
| | Alain Rayes | Intergovernmental Affairs | August 30, 2017 — October 21, 2019 |
| | Scott Reid | Democratic Institutions | November 20, 2015 — January 30, 2018 |
| | Scott Reid | Deputy Opposition House Leader | November 20, 2015 — September 14, 2016 |
| | Michelle Rempel | Immigration, Refugees & Citizenship | November 20, 2015 — October 21, 2019 |
| | Blake Richards | Tourism | November 20, 2015 — October 21, 2019 |
| | Blake Richards | Deputy Democratic Institutions | November 20, 2015 — August 29, 2017 |
| | Blake Richards | Democratic Institutions | January 31, 2018 — September 6, 2018 |
| | Blake Richards | Small Business & Export Promotion | September 7, 2018 — October 21, 2019 |
| | Gerry Ritz | International Trade | November 20, 2015 — August 29, 2017 |
| | Bob Saroya | Deputy Immigration, Refugees & Citizenship | November 20, 2015 — October 21, 2019 |
| | Bob Saroya | Multiculturalism | September 7, 2018 — October 21, 2019 |
| | Andrew Scheer | Opposition House Leader | November 20, 2015 — September 14, 2016 |
| | Andrew Scheer | Leader of the Opposition | May 27, 2017 — October 21, 2019 |
| | Andrew Scheer | Leader of the Conservative Party | May 27, 2017 — October 21, 2019 |
| | Jamie Schmale | Economic Development (N. Ontario) | August 30, 2017 — October 21, 2019 |
| | Jamie Schmale | Deputy Natural Resources | August 30, 2017 — October 21, 2019 |
| | Bev Shipley | Rural Affairs | November 20, 2015 — August 29, 2017 |
| | Robert Sopuck | Wildlife Conservation | November 20, 2015 — October 21, 2019 |
| | Robert Sopuck | Deputy Environment & Climate Change | August 30, 2017 — October 21, 2019 |
| | Mark Strahl | Fisheries & Oceans | November 20, 2015 — September 14, 2016 |
| | Mark Strahl | Natural Resources | September 15, 2016 — August 29, 2017 |
| | Mark Strahl | Chief Opposition Whip | July 20, 2017 — October 21, 2019 |
| | Shannon Stubbs | Deputy Natural Resources | November 20, 2015 — August 29, 2017 |
| | Shannon Stubbs | Natural Resources | August 30, 2017 — October 21, 2019 |
| | Dave Van Kesteren | Deputy International Trade | November 20, 2015 — August 29, 2017 |
| | Dave Van Kesteren | Deputy Families, Children & Social Development | August 30, 2017 — October 21, 2019 |
| | Peter Van Loan | Canadian Heritage | November 20, 2015 — September 6, 2018 |
| | Karen Vecchio | Families, Children & Social Development | November 20, 2015 — October 21, 2019 |
| | Arnold Viersen | Deputy Rural Affairs | November 20, 2015 — August 29, 2017 |
| | Arnold Viersen | Deputy Innovation, Science & Economic Development | August 30, 2017 — October 21, 2019 |
| | Cathay Wagantall | Deputy Veterans Affairs | November 20, 2015 — October 21, 2019 |
| | Mark Warawa | Seniors | November 20, 2015 — August 29, 2017 |
| | Mark Warawa | Income Security & Palliative Care | September 25, 2017 — June 20, 2019 |
| | Mark Warawa | Deputy Seniors | September 25, 2017 — June 20, 2019 |
| | Chris Warkentin | Agriculture | November 20, 2015 — September 14, 2016 |
| | Chris Warkentin | Deputy Opposition House Leader | September 15, 2016 — October 21, 2019 |
| | Dianne Watts | Infrastructure & Communities | November 20, 2015 — August 29, 2017 |
| | Dianne Watts | Urban Affairs | October 16, 2016 — August 29, 2017 |
| | Dianne Watts | Employment, Labour & Workforce Development | August 30, 2017 — September 24, 2017 |
| | Kevin Waugh | Deputy Canadian Heritage | November 20, 2015 — August 29, 2017 |
| | Kevin Waugh | Deputy Indigenous Relations | August 30, 2017 — October 21, 2019 |
| | Alice Wong | Small Business | November 20, 2015 — August 29, 2017 |
| | Alice Wong | Seniors | August 30, 2017 — October 21, 2019 |
| | Bob Zimmer | Deputy Families, Children & Social Development | November 20, 2015 — August 29, 2017 |
| | Bob Zimmer | Deputy Treasury Board | August 30, 2017 — October 21, 2019 |

== By Shadow Cabinet ==
Following the 2015 federal election, held on October 19, 2015, the Conservative Party lost power and became the 42nd Parliament of Canada's Official Opposition. It was led by Rona Ambrose on an interim basis from November 2015 to May 2017.

Andrew Scheer was elected permanent leader in May 2017. When he named his shadow cabinet in August 2017, he chose to use the term "shadow minister", used in the UK and other Westminster parliaments, instead of the traditional Canadian term "critic". CBC News speculated that the term was chosen to show increased seriousness.

=== Andrew Scheer ===
==== Scheer VI (September 7, 2018 – October 21, 2019) ====
| Portfolio | Critic | Deputy |
|---|---|---|
Caucus Officers
| Leader of the Opposition; CPC Leader | Hon. Andrew Scheer | Hon. Lisa Raitt |
| Opposition Senate Leader | Hon. Larry Smith | Hon. Yonah Martin |
| Opposition Senate Whip | Hon. Don Plett | Hon. David Wells |
| Opposition House Leader | Hon. Candice Bergen | Chris Warkentin |
| Opposition Whip | Mark Strahl | John Brassard |
| Caucus Chair | David Sweet (H); David Wells (S) | None |
Senior Parliamentary Critics
| Agriculture | Luc Berthold | John Barlow |
| Border Security | Leona Alleslev | None |
| Canadian Heritage | Hon. Steven Blaney | None |
| Democratic Institutions | Stephanie Kusie | None |
| Employment, Labour & Workforce | John Barlow | Ted Falk |
| Environment & Climate Change | Hon. Ed Fast | Robert Sopuck |
| Families, Children & Social Development | Karen Vecchio | Dave Van Kesteren |
| Finance | Hon. Pierre Poilievre | Tom Kmiec |
| Fisheries & Oceans | Todd Doherty | Mel Arnold |
| Foreign Affairs | Hon. Erin O'Toole | Garnett Genuis |
| Health | Marilyn Gladu | Stephanie Kusie |
| Immigration, Refugees & Citizenship | Hon. Michelle Rempel | Bob Saroya |
| Indigenous Relations & Northern Affairs | Cathy McLeod | Kevin Waugh |
| Indigenous Services | Cathy McLeod | None |
| Infrastructure & Communities | Matt Jeneroux | Joel Godin |
| Innovation & Economic Development | Dan Albas | Arnold Viersen |
| Intergovernmental Affairs | Alain Rayes | None |
| International Development | Ziad Aboultaif | Hon. Mike Lake |
| International Trade | Dean Allison | Alupa Clarke |
| Justice | Hon. Tony Clement | Michael Cooper |
| National Defence | James Bezan | Richard Martel |
| National Revenue | Pat Kelly | None |
| Natural Resources | Shannon Stubbs | Jamie Schmale |
| Public Safety | Pierre Paul-Hus | Glen Motz |
| Public Services | Hon. Rob Nicholson | Kerry Diotte |
| Science | Matt Jeneroux | None |
| Small Business & Export Promotion | Blake Richards | None |
| Sport & Disabilities | Alex Nuttall | Robert Kitchen |
| Status of Women | Rachael Harder | None |
| Tourism, Official Languages and La Francophonie | Blake Richards (T); Hon. Steven Blaney (OL/LF) | None |
| Transport | Kelly Block | Ben Lobb |
| Treasury Board | Gerard Deltell | Bob Zimmer |
| Veterans Affairs | Phil McColeman | Cathay Wagantall |
| Youth | Alex Nuttall | Robert Kitchen |
Other Parliamentary Critics
| Canada-US Relations | Colin Carrie | None |
| Economic Development (Quebec) | Sylvie Boucher | None |
| Economic Development (N. Ontario) | Jamie Schmale | None |
| Economic Development (S. Ontario) | Colin Carrie | None |
| Economic Development (The North) | Cathy McLeod | None |
| Ethics | Hon. Peter Kent | Jacques Gourde |
| Human Rights & Religious Freedom | David Anderson | None |
| Interprovincial Trade | John Nater | None |
| Francophonie & Official Languages | Alupa Clarke | None |
| Multiculturalism | Bob Saroya | None |
| Rural Affairs | Sylvie Boucher | None |
| Seniors | Hon. Alice Wong | Mark Warawa |
| Shared Economy | John Nater | None |
| Urban Affairs | Hon. Michael Chong | None |
| Western Economic Diversification | Tom Lukiwski | None |
| Wildlife Conservation | Robert Sopuck | None |

==== Scheer V (June 13, 2018 – September 6, 2018) ====
| Portfolio | Critic | Deputy |
|---|---|---|
Caucus Officers
| Leader of the Opposition; CPC Leader | Hon. Andrew Scheer | Hon. Lisa Raitt |
| Opposition Senate Leader | Hon. Larry Smith | Hon. Yonah Martin |
| Opposition Senate Whip | Hon. Don Plett | Hon. David Wells |
| Opposition House Leader | Hon. Candice Bergen | Chris Warkentin |
| Opposition Whip | Mark Strahl | John Brassard |
| Caucus Chair | David Sweet (H); David Wells (S) | None |
Senior Parliamentary Critics
| Agriculture | Luc Berthold | John Barlow |
| Canadian Heritage | Hon. Peter Van Loan | None |
| Democratic Institutions | Blake Richards | None |
| Employment, Labour & Workforce | Hon. Steven Blaney | Ted Falk |
| Environment & Climate Change | Hon. Ed Fast | Robert Sopuck |
| Families, Children & Social Development | Karen Vecchio | Dave Van Kesteren |
| Finance | Hon. Pierre Poilievre | Tom Kmiec |
| Fisheries & Oceans | Todd Doherty | Mel Arnold |
| Foreign Affairs | Hon. Erin O'Toole | Garnett Genuis |
| Health | Marilyn Gladu | Stephanie Kusie |
| Immigration, Refugees & Citizenship | Hon. Michelle Rempel | Bob Saroya |
| Indigenous Relations & Northern Affairs | Cathy McLeod | Kevin Waugh |
| Indigenous Services | Cathy McLeod | None |
| Infrastructure & Communities | Hon. Michael Chong | Joel Godin |
| Innovation & Economic Development | Matt Jeneroux | Arnold Viersen |
| Intergovernmental Affairs | Alain Rayes | None |
| International Development | Ziad Aboultaif | Hon. Mike Lake |
| International Trade | Dean Allison | Alupa Clarke |
| Justice | Hon. Rob Nicholson | Michael Cooper |
| National Defence | James Bezan | None |
| National Revenue | Pat Kelly | None |
| Natural Resources | Shannon Stubbs | Jamie Schmale |
| Public Safety | Pierre Paul-Hus | Glen Motz |
| Public Services | Hon. Tony Clement | Kerry Diotte |
| Science | Hon. Michael Chong | None |
| Small Business & Tourism | Dan Albas (SB); Blake Richards (T) | None |
| Sport & Disabilities | Alex Nuttall | Robert Kitchen |
| Status of Women | Rachael Harder | None |
| Transport | Kelly Block | Ben Lobb |
| Treasury Board | Gerard Deltell | Bob Zimmer |
| Veterans Affairs | Phil McColeman | Cathay Wagantall |
| Youth | Alex Nuttall | Robert Kitchen |
Other Parliamentary Critics
| Canada-US Relations | Colin Carrie | None |
| Economic Development (Quebec) | Sylvie Boucher | None |
| Economic Development (N. Ontario) | Jamie Schmale | None |
| Economic Development (S. Ontario) | Colin Carrie | None |
| Economic Development (The North) | Cathy McLeod | None |
| Ethics | Hon. Peter Kent | Jacques Gourde |
| Human Rights & Religious Freedom | David Anderson | None |
| Interprovincial Trade | John Nater | None |
| Rural Affairs | Sylvie Boucher | None |
| Seniors | Hon. Alice Wong | Mark Warawa |
| Shared Economy | John Nater | None |
| Urban Affairs | Hon. Michael Chong | None |
| Western Economic Diversification | Tom Lukiwski | None |
| Wildlife Conservation | Robert Sopuck | None |

==== Scheer IV (January 31, 2018 – June 12, 2018) ====
| Portfolio | Critic | Deputy |
|---|---|---|
Caucus Officers
| Leader of the Opposition; CPC Leader | Hon. Andrew Scheer | Hon. Lisa Raitt |
| Opposition Senate Leader | Hon. Larry Smith | Hon. Yonah Martin |
| Opposition Senate Whip | Hon. Don Plett | Hon. David Wells |
| Opposition House Leader | Hon. Candice Bergen | Chris Warkentin |
| Opposition Whip | Mark Strahl | John Brassard |
| Caucus Chair | David Sweet (H); David Wells (S) | None |
Senior Parliamentary Critics
| Agriculture | Luc Berthold | John Barlow |
| Canadian Heritage | Hon. Peter Van Loan | None |
| Democratic Institutions | Blake Richards | None |
| Employment, Labour & Workforce | Hon. Steven Blaney | Ted Falk |
| Environment & Climate Change | Hon. Ed Fast | Robert Sopuck |
| Families, Children & Social Development | Karen Vecchio | Dave Van Kesteren |
| Finance | Hon. Pierre Poilievre | Tom Kmiec |
| Fisheries & Oceans | Todd Doherty | Mel Arnold |
| Foreign Affairs | Hon. Erin O'Toole | Garnett Genuis |
| Health | Marilyn Gladu | Stephanie Kusie |
| Immigration, Refugees & Citizenship | Hon. Michelle Rempel | Bob Saroya |
| Indigenous Relations & Northern Affairs | Cathy McLeod | Kevin Waugh |
| Indigenous Services | Cathy McLeod | None |
| Infrastructure & Communities | Hon. Michael Chong | Joel Godin |
| Innovation & Economic Development | Hon. Maxime Bernier | Arnold Viersen |
| Intergovernmental Affairs | Alain Rayes | None |
| International Development | Ziad Aboultaif | Hon. Mike Lake |
| International Trade | Dean Allison | Alupa Clarke |
| Justice | Hon. Rob Nicholson | Michael Cooper |
| National Defence | James Bezan | Gord Brown |
| National Revenue | Pat Kelly | None |
| Natural Resources | Shannon Stubbs | Jamie Schmale |
| Public Safety | Pierre Paul-Hus | Glen Motz |
| Public Services | Hon. Tony Clement | Kerry Diotte |
| Science | Matt Jeneroux | None |
| Small Business & Tourism | Dan Albas (SB); Blake Richards (T) | None |
| Sport & Disabilities | Alex Nuttall | Robert Kitchen |
| Status of Women | Rachael Harder | None |
| Transport | Kelly Block | Ben Lobb |
| Treasury Board | Gerard Deltell | Bob Zimmer |
| Veterans Affairs | Phil McColeman | Cathay Wagantall |
| Youth | Alex Nuttall | Robert Kitchen |
Other Parliamentary Critics
| Canada-US Relations | Colin Carrie | None |
| Economic Development (Quebec) | Sylvie Boucher | None |
| Economic Development (N. Ontario) | Jamie Schmale | None |
| Economic Development (S. Ontario) | Colin Carrie | None |
| Economic Development (The North) | Cathy McLeod | None |
| Ethics | Hon. Peter Kent | Jacques Gourde |
| Human Rights & Religious Freedom | David Anderson | None |
| Interprovincial Trade | John Nater | None |
| Francophonie & Official Languages | Alupa Clarke | None |
| Rural Affairs | Sylvie Boucher | None |
| Seniors | Hon. Alice Wong | Mark Warawa |
| Shared Economy | John Nater | None |
| Urban Affairs | Hon. Michael Chong | None |
| Western Economic Diversification | Tom Lukiwski | None |
| Wildlife Conservation | Robert Sopuck | None |

==== Scheer III (September 25, 2017 – January 30, 2018) ====
| Portfolio | Critic | Deputy |
|---|---|---|
Caucus Officers
| Leader of the Opposition; CPC Leader | Hon. Andrew Scheer | Hon. Lisa Raitt |
| Opposition Senate Leader | Hon. Larry Smith | Hon. Yonah Martin |
| Opposition Senate Whip | Hon. Don Plett | Hon. David Wells |
| Opposition House Leader | Hon. Candice Bergen | Chris Warkentin |
| Opposition Whip | Mark Strahl | John Brassard |
| Caucus Chair | David Sweet (H); David Wells (S) | None |
Senior Parliamentary Critics
| Agriculture | Luc Berthold | John Barlow |
| Canadian Heritage | Hon. Peter Van Loan | None |
| Democratic Institutions | Scott Reid | None |
| Employment, Labour & Workforce | Hon. Steven Blaney | Ted Falk |
| Environment & Climate Change | Hon. Ed Fast | Robert Sopuck |
| Families, Children & Social Development | Karen Vecchio | Dave Van Kesteren |
| Finance | Hon. Pierre Poilievre | Tom Kmiec |
| Fisheries & Oceans | Todd Doherty | Mel Arnold |
| Foreign Affairs | Hon. Erin O'Toole | Garnett Genuis |
| Health | Marilyn Gladu | Stephanie Kusie |
| Immigration, Refugees & Citizenship | Hon. Michelle Rempel | Bob Saroya |
| Indigenous Relations & Northern Affairs | Cathy McLeod | Kevin Waugh |
| Indigenous Services | Cathy McLeod | None |
| Infrastructure & Communities | Hon. Michael Chong | Joel Godin |
| Innovation & Economic Development | Hon. Maxime Bernier | Arnold Viersen |
| Intergovernmental Affairs | Alain Rayes | None |
| International Development | Ziad Aboultaif | Hon. Mike Lake |
| International Trade | Dean Allison | Alupa Clarke |
| Justice | Hon. Rob Nicholson | Michael Cooper |
| National Defence | James Bezan | Gord Brown |
| National Revenue | Pat Kelly | None |
| Natural Resources | Shannon Stubbs | Jamie Schmale |
| Public Safety | Pierre Paul-Hus | Glen Motz |
| Public Services | Hon. Tony Clement | Kerry Diotte |
| Science | Matt Jeneroux | None |
| Small Business & Tourism | Dan Albas (SB); Blake Richards (T) | None |
| Sport & Disabilities | Alex Nuttall | Robert Kitchen |
| Status of Women | Rachael Harder | None |
| Transport | Kelly Block | Ben Lobb |
| Treasury Board | Gerard Deltell | Bob Zimmer |
| Veterans Affairs | Phil McColeman | Cathay Wagantall |
| Youth | Alex Nuttall | Robert Kitchen |
Other Parliamentary Critics
| Canada-US Relations | Colin Carrie | None |
| Economic Development (Quebec) | Sylvie Boucher | None |
| Economic Development (N. Ontario) | Jamie Schmale | None |
| Economic Development (S. Ontario) | Colin Carrie | None |
| Economic Development (The North) | Cathy McLeod | None |
| Ethics | Hon. Peter Kent | Jacques Gourde |
| Human Rights & Religious Freedom | David Anderson | None |
| Interprovincial Trade | John Nater | None |
| Francophonie & Official Languages | Alupa Clarke | None |
| Rural Affairs | Sylvie Boucher | None |
| Seniors | Hon. Alice Wong | Mark Warawa |
| Shared Economy | John Nater | None |
| Urban Affairs | Hon. Michael Chong | None |
| Western Economic Diversification | Tom Lukiwski | None |
| Wildlife Conservation | Robert Sopuck | None |

==== Scheer II (August 30, 2017 – September 24, 2017) ====
| Portfolio | Critic | Deputy |
|---|---|---|
Caucus Officers
| Leader of the Opposition; CPC Leader | Hon. Andrew Scheer | Hon. Lisa Raitt |
| Opposition Senate Leader | Hon. Larry Smith | Hon. Yonah Martin |
| Opposition Senate Whip | Hon. Don Plett | Hon. David Wells |
| Opposition House Leader | Hon. Candice Bergen | Chris Warkentin |
| Opposition Whip | Mark Strahl | John Brassard |
| Caucus Chair | David Sweet (H); David Wells (S) | None |
Senior Parliamentary Critics
| Agriculture | Luc Berthold | John Barlow |
| Canadian Heritage | Hon. Peter Van Loan | None |
| Democratic Institutions | Scott Reid | None |
| Employment, Labour & Opportunity | Dianne Watts | Phil McColeman |
| Environment & Climate Change | Hon. Ed Fast | Robert Sopuck |
| Families, Children & Social Development | Karen Vecchio | Dave Van Kesteren |
| Finance | Hon. Pierre Poilievre | Tom Kmiec |
| Fisheries & Oceans | Todd Doherty | Mel Arnold |
| Foreign Affairs | Hon. Erin O'Toole | Garnett Genuis |
| Health | Marilyn Gladu | Stephanie Kusie |
| Immigration, Refugees & Citizenship | Hon. Michelle Rempel | Bob Saroya |
| Indigenous Relations & Northern Affairs | Cathy McLeod | Kevin Waugh |
| Indigenous Services | Cathy McLeod | None |
| Infrastructure & Communities | Hon. Michael Chong | Joel Godin |
| Innovation & Economic Development | Hon. Maxime Bernier | Arnold Viersen |
| Intergovernmental Affairs | Alain Rayes | None |
| International Development | Ziad Aboultaif | Hon. Mike Lake |
| International Trade | Dean Allison | Alupa Clarke |
| Justice | Hon. Rob Nicholson | Michael Cooper |
| National Defence | James Bezan | Gord Brown |
| National Revenue | Pat Kelly | None |
| Natural Resources | Shannon Stubbs | Jamie Schmale |
| Public Safety | Pierre Paul-Hus | Glen Motz |
| Public Services | Hon. Tony Clement | Kerry Diotte |
| Science | Matt Jeneroux | None |
| Small Business & Tourism | Dan Albas (SB); Blake Richards (T) | None |
| Sport & Disabilities | Alex Nuttall | Robert Kitchen |
| Status of Women | Rachael Harder | None |
| Transport | Kelly Block | Ben Lobb |
| Treasury Board | Gerard Deltell | Bob Zimmer |
| Veterans Affairs | Hon. Steven Blaney | Cathay Wagantall |
| Youth | Alex Nuttall | Robert Kitchen |
Other Parliamentary Critics
| Canada-US Relations | Colin Carrie | None |
| Economic Development (Quebec) | Sylvie Boucher | None |
| Economic Development (N. Ontario) | Jamie Schmale | None |
| Economic Development (S. Ontario) | Colin Carrie | None |
| Economic Development (The North) | Cathy McLeod | None |
| Ethics | Hon. Peter Kent | Jacques Gourde |
| Human Rights & Religious Freedom | David Anderson | None |
| Interprovincial Trade | John Nater | None |
| Francophonie & Official Languages | Alupa Clarke | None |
| Rural Affairs | Sylvie Boucher | None |
| Seniors | Hon. Alice Wong | None |
| Shared Economy | John Nater | None |
| Urban Affairs | Hon. Michael Chong | None |
| Western Economic Diversification | Tom Lukiwski | None |
| Wildlife Conservation | Robert Sopuck | None |

==== Scheer I (May 27, 2017 – August 30, 2017) ====
| Portfolio | Critic | Deputy |
|---|---|---|
Caucus Officers
| Leader of the Opposition; CPC Leader | Hon. Andrew Scheer | Hon. Denis Lebel |
| Opposition Senate Leader | Hon. Larry Smith | Hon. Yonah Martin |
| Opposition Senate Whip | Hon. Don Plett | Hon. David Wells |
| Opposition House Leader | Hon. Candice Bergen | Chris Warkentin |
| Opposition Whip | Gord Brown | Dave MacKenzie |
| Caucus Chair | David Sweet (H); David Wells (S) | None |
Senior Parliamentary Critics
| Agriculture | David Anderson | Jacques Gourde |
| Canadian Heritage | Hon. Peter Van Loan | Kevin Waugh |
| Democratic Institutions | Scott Reid | Blake Richards |
| Employment, Labour & Opportunity | Hon. Pierre Poilievre | Ben Lobb |
| Environment | Hon. Ed Fast | Joël Godin |
| Families & Children | Karen Vecchio | Bob Zimmer |
| Finance | Gérard Deltell | Dan Albas |
| Fisheries & Oceans | Todd Doherty | Mel Arnold |
| Foreign Affairs | Hon. Peter Kent | Tom Kmiec |
| Health | Colin Carrie | Rachael Harder |
| Immigration | Hon. Michelle Rempel | Bob Saroya |
| Indigenous & Northern Affairs | Cathy McLeod | Todd Doherty |
| Infrastructure & Communities | Dianne Watts | Alain Rayes |
| Innovation | Hon. Diane Finley | Alex Nuttall |
| Intergovernmental Affairs | Hon. Denis Lebel | None |
| International Development | Dean Allison | None |
| International Trade | Hon. Gerry Ritz | Dave Van Kesteren |
| Justice | Hon. Rob Nicholson | Michael Cooper |
| National Defence | James Bezan | Pierre Paul-Hus |
| National Revenue | Ziad Aboultaif | None |
| Natural Resources | Mark Strahl | Shannon Stubbs |
| Public Safety | Hon. Tony Clement | Larry Miller |
| Public Services | Alupa Clarke | Kelly McCauley |
| Science | Marilyn Gladu | None |
| Small Business & Tourism | Hon. Alice Wong (SB); Blake Richards (T) | None |
| Sport | Robert Kitchen | None |
| Status of Women | Hon. Rona Ambrose | None |
| Transport | Kelly Block | Luc Berthold |
| Treasury Board | Phil McColeman | Pat Kelly |
| Veterans Affairs | John Brassard | Cathay Wagantall |
Other Parliamentary Critics
| Economic Development (Quebec) | Bernard Genereux | None |
| Economic Development (N. Ontario) | Cheryl Gallant | None |
| Economic Development (S. Ontario) | Alex Nuttall | None |
| Economic Development (The North) | David Yurdiga | None |
| Human Rights | David Anderson | Garnett Genuis |
| Interprovincial Trade | John Barlow | None |
| Francophonie & Official Languages | Hon. Sylvie Boucher | None |
| Newborn & Maternal Health | Mike Lake | None |
| Persons with Disabilities | Rachael Harder | None |
| Rural Affairs | Bev Shipley | Arnold Viersen |
| Seniors | Mark Warawa | None |
| Shared Economy | Alex Nuttall | None |
| Urban Affairs | Dianne Watts | Kerry Diotte |
| Western Economic Diversification | Matt Jeneroux | None |
| Wildlife Conservation | Robert Sopuck | None |
| Youth | Rachael Harder | None |

=== Rona Ambrose ===
==== Ambrose VI (October 16, 2016 – May 27, 2017) ====
| Portfolio | Critic | Deputy |
|---|---|---|
Caucus Officers
| Leader of the Opposition; CPC Interim Leader | Hon. Rona Ambrose | Hon. Denis Lebel |
| Opposition Senate Leader | Hon. Claude Carignan | Hon. Yonah Martin |
| Opposition Senate Whip | Hon. Don Plett | Hon. David Wells |
| Opposition House Leader | Hon. Candice Bergen | Chris Warkentin |
| Opposition Whip | Gord Brown | Dave MacKenzie |
| Caucus Chair | David Sweet (H); Linda Frum (S) | None |
Senior Parliamentary Critics
| Agriculture | David Anderson | Jacques Gourde |
| Canadian Heritage | Hon. Peter Van Loan | Kevin Waugh |
| Democratic Institutions | Scott Reid | Blake Richards |
| Employment, Labour & Opportunity | Hon. Pierre Poilievre | Ben Lobb |
| Environment | Hon. Ed Fast | Joël Godin |
| Families & Children | Karen Vecchio | Bob Zimmer |
| Finance | Gérard Deltell | Dan Albas |
| Fisheries & Oceans | Todd Doherty | Mel Arnold |
| Foreign Affairs | Hon. Peter Kent | Tom Kmiec |
| Health | Colin Carrie | Rachael Harder |
| Immigration | Hon. Michelle Rempel | Bob Saroya |
| Indigenous & Northern Affairs | Cathy McLeod | Todd Doherty |
| Infrastructure & Communities | Dianne Watts | Alain Rayes |
| Innovation | Hon. Diane Finley | Alex Nuttall |
| Intergovernmental Affairs | Hon. Denis Lebel | None |
| International Development | Dean Allison | None |
| International Trade | Hon. Gerry Ritz | Dave Van Kesteren |
| Justice | Hon. Rob Nicholson | Michael Cooper |
| National Defence | James Bezan | Pierre Paul-Hus |
| National Revenue | Ziad Aboultaif | None |
| Natural Resources | Mark Strahl | Shannon Stubbs |
| Public Safety | Hon. Tony Clement | Larry Miller |
| Public Services | Alupa Clarke | Kelly McCauley |
| Science | Marilyn Gladu | None |
| Small Business & Tourism | Hon. Alice Wong (SB); Blake Richards (T) | None |
| Sport | Robert Kitchen | None |
| Status of Women | Hon. Rona Ambrose | None |
| Transport | Kelly Block | Luc Berthold |
| Treasury Board | Phil McColeman | Pat Kelly |
| Veterans Affairs | John Brassard | Cathay Wagantall |
Other Parliamentary Critics
| Economic Development (Quebec) | Bernard Genereux | None |
| Economic Development (N. Ontario) | Cheryl Gallant | None |
| Economic Development (S. Ontario) | Alex Nuttall | None |
| Economic Development (The North) | David Yurdiga | None |
| Human Rights | David Anderson | Garnett Genuis |
| Interprovincial Trade | John Barlow | None |
| Francophonie & Official Languages | Hon. Sylvie Boucher | None |
| Newborn & Maternal Health | Mike Lake | None |
| Persons with Disabilities | Rachael Harder | None |
| Rural Affairs | Bev Shipley | Arnold Viersen |
| Seniors | Mark Warawa | None |
| Shared Economy | Alex Nuttall | None |
| Urban Affairs | Dianne Watts | Kerry Diotte |
| Western Economic Diversification | Matt Jeneroux | None |
| Wildlife Conservation | Robert Sopuck | None |
| Youth | Rachael Harder | None |

==== Ambrose V (September 15, 2016 – October 15, 2016) ====
| Portfolio | Critic | Deputy |
|---|---|---|
Caucus Officers
| Leader of the Opposition; CPC Interim Leader | Hon. Rona Ambrose | Hon. Denis Lebel |
| Opposition Senate Leader | Hon. Claude Carignan | Hon. Yonah Martin |
| Opposition Senate Whip | Hon. Don Plett | Hon. David Wells |
| Opposition House Leader | Hon. Candice Bergen | Chris Warkentin |
| Opposition Whip | Gord Brown | Dave MacKenzie |
| Caucus Chair | David Sweet | None |
Senior Parliamentary Critics
| Agriculture | David Anderson | Jacques Gourde |
| Canadian Heritage | Hon. Peter Van Loan | Kevin Waugh |
| Democratic Institutions | Scott Reid | Blake Richards |
| Employment & Labour | Gérard Deltell | John Barlow |
| Environment | Hon. Ed Fast | Joël Godin |
| Families & Children | Karen Vecchio | Bob Zimmer |
| Finance | Hon. Lisa Raitt | Phil McColeman |
| Fisheries & Oceans | Todd Doherty | Mel Arnold |
| Foreign Affairs | Hon. Peter Kent | Alain Rayes |
| Health | Colin Carrie | Rachael Harder |
| Immigration | Hon. Michelle Rempel | Bob Saroya |
| Indigenous & Northern Affairs | Cathy McLeod | Todd Doherty |
| Infrastructure & Communities | Dianne Watts | Luc Berthold |
| Innovation | Hon. Diane Finley | Alex Nuttall |
| Intergovernmental Affairs | Hon. Denis Lebel | None |
| International Development | Dean Allison | None |
| International Trade | Hon. Gerry Ritz | Dave Van Kesteren |
| Justice | Hon. Rob Nicholson | Michael Cooper |
| National Defence | James Bezan | Pierre Paul-Hus |
| National Revenue | Ziad Aboultaif | None |
| Natural Resources | Mark Strahl | Shannon Stubbs |
| Public Safety | Hon. Erin O'Toole | Larry Miller |
| Public Services | Hon. Steven Blaney | Kelly McCauley |
| Science | Marilyn Gladu | None |
| Small Business & Tourism | Hon. Alice Wong (SB); Blake Richards (T) | None |
| Sport | Robert Kitchen | None |
| Status of Women | Hon. Rona Ambrose | None |
| Transport | Kelly Block | Ben Lobb |
| Treasury Board | Hon. Pierre Poilievre | Pat Kelly |
| Veterans Affairs | Alupa Clarke | Cathay Wagantall |
Other Parliamentary Critics
| Economic Development (Quebec) | Joël Godin | None |
| Economic Development (N. Ontario) | Cheryl Gallant | None |
| Economic Development (S. Ontario) | Alex Nuttall | None |
| Human Rights | David Anderson | Garnett Genuis |
| Interprovincial Trade | Dan Albas | None |
| La Francophonie | Hon. Sylvie Boucher | Bernard Généreux |
| Newborn & Maternal Health | Mike Lake | None |
| Persons with Disabilities | Rachael Harder | None |
| Rural Affairs | Bev Shipley | Arnold Viersen |
| Seniors | Mark Warawa | None |
| Shared Economy | Alex Nuttall | None |
| Urban Affairs | John Brassard | Kerry Diotte |
| Western Economic Diversification | Matt Jeneroux | None |
| Wildlife Conservation | Robert Sopuck | None |
| Youth | Rachael Harder | None |

==== Ambrose IV (July 13, 2016 – September 14, 2016) ====
| Portfolio | Critic | Deputy |
|---|---|---|
Caucus Officers
| Leader of the Opposition; CPC Interim Leader | Hon. Rona Ambrose | Hon. Denis Lebel |
| Opposition Senate Leader | Hon. Claude Carignan | Hon. Yonah Martin |
| Opposition Senate Whip | Hon. Don Plett | Hon. David Wells |
| Opposition House Leader | Andrew Scheer | Scott Reid |
| Opposition Whip | Gord Brown | Dave MacKenzie |
| Caucus Chair | David Sweet | None |
Senior Parliamentary Critics
| Agriculture | Chris Warkentin | Jacques Gourde |
| Canadian Heritage | Hon. Peter Van Loan | Kevin Waugh |
| Democratic Institutions | Scott Reid | Blake Richards |
| Employment & Labour | Gérard Deltell | John Barlow |
| Environment | Hon. Ed Fast | Joël Godin |
| Families & Children | Karen Vecchio | Bob Zimmer |
| Finance | Hon. Lisa Raitt | Phil McColeman |
| Fisheries & Oceans | Mark Strahl | Mel Arnold |
| Foreign Affairs | Hon. Peter Kent | Alain Rayes |
| Health | Colin Carrie | Rachael Harder |
| Immigration | Hon. Michelle Rempel | Bob Saroya |
| Indigenous & Northern Affairs | Cathy McLeod | Todd Doherty |
| Infrastructure & Communities | Dianne Watts | Luc Berthold |
| Innovation | Hon. Diane Finley | Alex Nuttall |
| Intergovernmental Affairs | Hon. Denis Lebel | None |
| International Development | Dean Allison | TBA |
| International Trade | Hon. Gerry Ritz | Dave Van Kesteren |
| Justice | Hon. Rob Nicholson | Michael Cooper |
| National Defence | James Bezan | Pierre Paul-Hus |
| National Revenue | Ziad Aboultaif | None |
| Natural Resources | Hon. Candice Bergen | Shannon Stubbs |
| Public Safety | Hon. Erin O'Toole | Larry Miller |
| Public Services | Hon. Steven Blaney | Kelly McCauley |
| Science | Marilyn Gladu | None |
| Small Business & Tourism | Blake Richards | Hon. Alice Wong |
| Sport | Robert Kitchen | None |
| Status of Women | Hon. Rona Ambrose | None |
| Transport | Kelly Block | Ben Lobb |
| Treasury Board | Hon. Pierre Poilievre | Pat Kelly |
| Veterans Affairs | Alupa Clarke | Cathay Wagantall |
Other Parliamentary Critics
| Economic Development (Quebec) | Joël Godin | None |
| Economic Development (N. Ontario) | Cheryl Gallant | None |
| Economic Development (S. Ontario) | Alex Nuttall | None |
| Human Rights | David Anderson | Garnett Genuis |
| Interprovincial Trade | Dan Albas | None |
| La Francophonie | Hon. Sylvie Boucher | Bernard Généreux |
| Newborn & Maternal Health | Mike Lake | None |
| Persons with Disabilities | Rachael Harder | None |
| Rural Affairs | Bev Shipley | Arnold Viersen |
| Seniors | Mark Warawa | None |
| Shared Economy | Alex Nuttall | None |
| Urban Affairs | John Brassard | Kerry Diotte |
| Western Economic Diversification | Matt Jeneroux | None |
| Wildlife Conservation | Robert Sopuck | None |
| Youth | Rachael Harder | None |

==== Ambrose III (May 17, 2016 – July 12, 2016) ====
| Portfolio | Critic | Deputy |
|---|---|---|
Caucus Officers
| Leader of the Opposition; CPC Interim Leader | Hon. Rona Ambrose | Hon. Denis Lebel |
| Opposition Senate Leader | Hon. Claude Carignan | Hon. Yonah Martin |
| Opposition Senate Whip | Hon. Don Plett | Hon. David Wells |
| Opposition House Leader | Andrew Scheer | Scott Reid |
| Opposition Whip | Gord Brown | Dave MacKenzie |
| Caucus Chair | David Sweet | None |
Senior Parliamentary Critics
| Agriculture | Chris Warkentin | Jacques Gourde |
| Canadian Heritage | Hon. Peter Van Loan | Kevin Waugh |
| Democratic Institutions | Scott Reid | Blake Richards |
| Employment & Labour | Gérard Deltell | John Barlow |
| Environment | Hon. Ed Fast | Joël Godin |
| Families & Children | Karen Vecchio | Bob Zimmer |
| Finance | Hon. Lisa Raitt | Phil McColeman |
| Fisheries & Oceans | Mark Strahl | Mel Arnold |
| Foreign Affairs | Hon. Tony Clement | Hon. Peter Kent |
| Health | Colin Carrie | Rachael Harder |
| Immigration | Hon. Michelle Rempel | Bob Saroya |
| Indigenous & Northern Affairs | Cathy McLeod | Todd Doherty |
| Infrastructure & Communities | Dianne Watts | Luc Berthold |
| Innovation | Hon. Diane Finley | Alex Nuttall |
| Intergovernmental Affairs | Hon. Denis Lebel | None |
| International Development | Hon. Deepak Obhrai | Dean Allison |
| International Trade | Hon. Gerry Ritz | Dave Van Kesteren |
| Justice | Hon. Rob Nicholson | Michael Cooper |
| National Defence | James Bezan | Pierre Paul-Hus |
| National Revenue | Ziad Aboultaif | None |
| Natural Resources | Hon. Candice Bergen | Shannon Stubbs |
| Public Safety | Hon. Erin O'Toole | Alain Rayes |
| Public Services | Hon. Steven Blaney | Kelly McCauley |
| Science | Marilyn Gladu | None |
| Small Business & Tourism | Blake Richards | Hon. Alice Wong |
| Sport | Robert Kitchen | None |
| Status of Women | Hon. Rona Ambrose | None |
| Transport | Kelly Block | Ben Lobb |
| Treasury Board | Hon. Pierre Poilievre | Pat Kelly |
| Veterans Affairs | Alupa Clarke | Cathay Wagantall |
Other Parliamentary Critics
| Economic Development (Quebec) | Joël Godin | None |
| Economic Development (N. Ontario) | Cheryl Gallant | None |
| Economic Development (S. Ontario) | Alex Nuttall | None |
| Human Rights | David Anderson | Garnett Genuis |
| Interprovincial Trade | Dan Albas | None |
| La Francophonie | Hon. Sylvie Boucher | Bernard Généreux |
| Newborn & Maternal Health | Mike Lake | None |
| Persons with Disabilities | Rachael Harder | None |
| Rural Affairs | Bev Shipley | Arnold Viersen |
| Seniors | Mark Warawa | None |
| Shared Economy | Alex Nuttall | None |
| Urban Affairs | John Brassard | Kerry Diotte |
| Western Economic Diversification | Matt Jeneroux | None |
| Wildlife Conservation | Robert Sopuck | None |
| Youth | Rachael Harder | None |

==== Ambrose II (April 8, 2016 – May 16, 2016) ====
| Portfolio | Critic | Deputy |
|---|---|---|
Caucus Officers
| Leader of the Opposition; CPC Interim Leader | Hon. Rona Ambrose | Hon. Denis Lebel |
| Opposition Senate Leader | Hon. Claude Carignan | Hon. Yonah Martin |
| Opposition Senate Whip | Hon. Don Plett | Hon. David Wells |
| Opposition House Leader | Andrew Scheer | Scott Reid |
| Opposition Whip | Gord Brown | Dave MacKenzie |
| Caucus Chair | David Sweet | None |
Senior Parliamentary Critics
| Agriculture | Chris Warkentin | Jacques Gourde |
| Canadian Heritage | Hon. Peter Van Loan | Kevin Waugh |
| Democratic Institutions | Scott Reid | Blake Richards |
| Employment & Labour | Gérard Deltell | John Barlow |
| Environment | Hon. Ed Fast | Hon. Michael Chong |
| Families & Children | Karen Vecchio | Bob Zimmer |
| Finance | Hon. Lisa Raitt | Phil McColeman |
| Fisheries & Oceans | Mark Strahl | Mel Arnold |
| Foreign Affairs | Hon. Tony Clement | Hon. Peter Kent |
| Health | Colin Carrie | Rachael Harder |
| Immigration | Hon. Michelle Rempel | Bob Saroya |
| Indigenous & Northern Affairs | Cathy McLeod | Todd Doherty |
| Infrastructure & Communities | Dianne Watts | Luc Berthold |
| Innovation | Hon. Diane Finley | Alex Nuttall |
| Intergovernmental Affairs | Hon. Denis Lebel | None |
| International Development | Hon. Deepak Obhrai | Dean Allison |
| International Trade | Hon. Gerry Ritz | Dave Van Kesteren |
| Justice | Hon. Rob Nicholson | Michael Cooper |
| National Defence | James Bezan | Pierre Paul-Hus |
| National Revenue | Ziad Aboultaif | None |
| Natural Resources | Hon. Candice Bergen | Shannon Stubbs |
| Public Safety | Hon. Erin O'Toole | Alain Rayes |
| Public Services | Hon. Steven Blaney | Kelly McCauley |
| Science | Marilyn Gladu | None |
| Small Business & Tourism | Blake Richards | Hon. Alice Wong |
| Sport | Robert Kitchen | None |
| Status of Women | Hon. Rona Ambrose | None |
| Transport | Kelly Block | Ben Lobb |
| Treasury Board | Hon. Pierre Poilievre | Pat Kelly |
| Veterans Affairs | Alupa Clarke | Cathay Wagantall |
Other Parliamentary Critics
| Economic Development (Quebec) | Joël Godin | None |
| Economic Development (N. Ontario) | Cheryl Gallant | None |
| Economic Development (S. Ontario) | Alex Nuttall | None |
| Human Rights | David Anderson | Garnett Genuis |
| Interprovincial Trade | Dan Albas | None |
| La Francophonie | Hon. Sylvie Boucher | Bernard Généreux |
| Newborn & Maternal Health | Mike Lake | None |
| Persons with Disabilities | Rachael Harder | None |
| Rural Affairs | Bev Shipley | Arnold Viersen |
| Seniors | Mark Warawa | None |
| Shared Economy | Alex Nuttall | None |
| Urban Affairs | John Brassard | Kerry Diotte |
| Western Economic Diversification | Matt Jeneroux | None |
| Wildlife Conservation | Robert Sopuck | None |
| Youth | Rachael Harder | None |

==== Ambrose I (October 19, 2015 – April 7, 2016) ====
| Portfolio | Critic | Deputy |
|---|---|---|
Caucus Officers
| Leader of the Opposition; CPC Interim Leader | Hon. Rona Ambrose | Hon. Denis Lebel |
| Opposition Senate Leader | Hon. Claude Carignan | Hon. Yonah Martin |
| Opposition Senate Whip | Hon. Don Plett | Hon. David Wells |
| Opposition House Leader | Andrew Scheer | Scott Reid |
| Opposition Whip | Gord Brown | Dave MacKenzie |
| Caucus Chair | David Sweet | None |
Senior Parliamentary Critics
| Agriculture | Chris Warkentin | Jacques Gourde |
| Canadian Heritage | Hon. Peter Van Loan | Kevin Waugh |
| Democratic Institutions | Scott Reid | Blake Richards |
| Employment & Labour | Gérard Deltell | John Barlow |
| Environment | Hon. Ed Fast | Hon. Michael Chong |
| Families & Children | Karen Vecchio | Bob Zimmer |
| Finance | Hon. Lisa Raitt | Phil McColeman |
| Fisheries & Oceans | Mark Strahl | Mel Arnold |
| Foreign Affairs | Hon. Tony Clement | Hon. Peter Kent |
| Health | Hon. Kellie Leitch | Colin Carrie |
| Immigration | Hon. Michelle Rempel | Bob Saroya |
| Indigenous & Northern Affairs | Cathy McLeod | Todd Doherty |
| Infrastructure & Communities | Dianne Watts | Luc Berthold |
| Innovation | Hon. Maxime Bernier | Hon. Diane Finley |
| Intergovernmental Affairs | Hon. Denis Lebel | None |
| International Development | Hon. Deepak Obhrai | Dean Allison |
| International Trade | Hon. Gerry Ritz | Dave Van Kesteren |
| Justice | Hon. Rob Nicholson | Michael Cooper |
| National Defence | James Bezan | Pierre Paul-Hus |
| National Revenue | Ziad Aboultaif | None |
| Natural Resources | Hon. Candice Bergen | Shannon Stubbs |
| Public Safety | Hon. Erin O'Toole | Alain Rayes |
| Public Services | Hon. Steven Blaney | Kelly McCauley |
| Science | Marilyn Gladu | None |
| Small Business & Tourism | Blake Richards | Hon. Alice Wong |
| Sport | Robert Kitchen | None |
| Status of Women | Hon. Rona Ambrose | None |
| Transport | Kelly Block | Ben Lobb |
| Treasury Board | Hon. Pierre Poilievre | Pat Kelly |
| Veterans Affairs | Alupa Clarke | Cathay Wagantall |
Other Parliamentary Critics
| Economic Development (Quebec) | Joël Godin | None |
| Economic Development (N. Ontario) | Cheryl Gallant | None |
| Economic Development (S. Ontario) | Alex Nuttall | None |
| Human Rights | David Anderson | Garnett Genuis |
| Interprovincial Trade | Dan Albas | None |
| La Francophonie | Hon. Sylvie Boucher | Bernard Généreux |
| Newborn & Maternal Health | Mike Lake | None |
| Persons with Disabilities | Rachael Harder | None |
| Rural Affairs | Bev Shipley | Arnold Viersen |
| Seniors | Mark Warawa | None |
| Urban Affairs | John Brassard | Kerry Diotte |
| Western Economic Diversification | Matt Jeneroux | None |
| Wildlife Conservation | Robert Sopuck | None |
| Youth | Rachael Harder | None |

== See also ==
- List of Leaders of the Official Opposition (Canada)
- Leader of the Opposition in the House of Commons (Canada)
- Leader of the Opposition in the Senate (Canada)
- Official Opposition (Canada)
