= Gary McHale =

Gary McHale is a Canadian political activist, noted for involvement in the Grand River land dispute.

== Personal life ==
In January 2013, McHale was the recipient of the Queen's Diamond Jubilee medal for contributions to his community. Nominated by the Canadian Taxpayer's Federation, McHale's award sparked controversy, with prominent First Nations leaders returning their medals as a result of his nomination.

During the Enbridge Line 9 protests and occupation in Hamilton, McHale claims to have incited the arrests of 18 anti-pipeline activists by sending a letter threatening legal action against the Hamilton Police Service. Hamilton Police denied McHale's claims, noting that action had been planned before McHale's involvement.

== Role in the Caledonia land dispute ==
During the Grand River land dispute, McHale organized protests against the occupation of the Douglas Creek Estates. Actions included the attempted removal of Aboriginal flags with the aim of replacing them with Canadian flags, for which he was arrested to prevent a breach of the peace. McHale's protests have been described as 'antics' in the national media.

On November 8, 2007, the OPP Police Commissioner reported to Hamilton Spectator that McHale's rallies have cost police over $500,000. According to the newspaper, 22 OPP police officers filed a $7.2 million lawsuit against McHale for defaming them on his website. McHale criticized the OPP officers who stopped him from hanging Canadian flags near the occupied site saying they were violating their oath of office. The photos of all the 22 police officers were also posted on the site under the heading "OPP: Hang your heads in shame," saying each one of them had violated their oath of office, the statement of claim said.

McHale was arrested and charged with conspiracy to commit mischief during a native smoke shop protest that turned violent in December 2007. As part of his bail conditions, McHale was barred from Caledonia and banned from communicating with certain individuals. Haldimand County mayor Marie Trainer and Haldimand—Norfolk—Brant MPP Toby Barrett spoke out in his defence.

McHale started a campaign of privately laying criminal charges against First Nations people for extortion, mischief and intimidation, which were all stayed by the Crown Prosecution Service. A judicial review case against the OPP for their refusal to appear in court when summoned by a subpoena.

== Political career ==
In the 2008 Federal election, McHale ran as an independent in Haldimand--Norfolk riding, coming in fourth place with 10% of the vote.

In the 2010 Ontario municipal elections, McHale ran for Haldimand County Regional Council in Ward 3, losing to incumbent councillor Craig Grice.

=== Election results ===
2008 Canadian federal election
Party	Candidate	Votes	%	±%	Expenditures
Conservative	Diane Finley	19,657	40.83	-7.5	$67,583
Liberal	Eric Hoskins	15,577	32.35	-1.9	$72,913
New Democratic	Ian Nichols	5,549	11.53	-1.3	$5,509
Independent	Gary McHale	4,821	10.01	–	$22,798
Green	Stephana Johnston	2,041	4.24	+0.7	$2,581
Christian Heritage	Steven Elgersma	501	1.04	0.0	
Total valid votes/Expense limit		48,146	100	$85,391	
Majority		4,080	8.48		
Total rejected ballots		248	0.51		
Turnout		48,394			

Summary of the October 25, 2010 Haldimand County Ward Three Councillor Election
Candidate	Popular vote		
Candidate	Votes	%	±%
Craig Grice (incumbent)	1,578	41.43%	n/a
Gary McHale	1,097	28.8%	n/a
Bryan Barker	933	24.5	n/a
Rob Duncan	177	5.27%	n/a
Total Votes	3,809	100%	
Registered Voters	8,090	47.08%	n/a
Note: All Haldimand County Municipal Elections are officially non-partisan. Note: Candidate campaign colours are based on the prominent colour used in campaign items (signs, literature, etc.) and are used as a visual differentiation between candidates.
Sources: Haldimand County Clerk's Office
