= AEAC =

AEAC may refer to:

- Adult Entertainment Association of Canada, a coalition of strip club owners and their agents
- Agnes Etherington Art Centre, a public art gallery
