= Claude Carignan =

Canadian politician (born 1964)

The Honourable Claude Carignan PC

Leader of the Government in the Senate
- In office August 20, 2013 – November 3, 2015
- Prime Minister: Stephen Harper
- Deputy: Yonah Martin
- Whip: Elizabeth Marshall
- Preceded by: Marjory LeBreton
- Succeeded by: Peter Harder (as Representative of the Government in the Senate)

Leader of the Opposition in the Senate
- In office November 4, 2015 – March 31, 2017
- Prime Minister: Justin Trudeau
- Deputy: Yonah Martin
- Whip: Don Plett
- Preceded by: Jim Cowan
- Succeeded by: Larry Smith

Canadian Senator from Quebec (Mille Isles)
- Incumbent
- Assumed office August 27, 2009
- Nominated by: Stephen Harper
- Appointed by: Michaëlle Jean
- Preceded by: Michel Biron

Personal details
- Born: December 4, 1964 (age 61) Champlain, Quebec, Canada
- Party: Conservative
- Spouse: Brigitte Binette
- Children: 3
- Education: University of Sherbrooke, University of Montreal
- Profession: Lawyer

Claude Carignan PC (born December 4, 1964) is a Canadian lawyer and politician. He was leader of the Conservative Party in the Senate of Canada, first as Leader of the Government in the Senate from 2013 to 2015 and then as Senate Opposition Leader from 2015 until 2017.

Carignan was appointed to the Senate on August 27, 2009, by Prime Minister Stephen Harper.

== Background ==
A native of Champlain, in Mauricie, Carignan is married to lawyer Brigitte Binette and has three children, Jérémie, Jean-Francis and Anne-Charlotte. He holds a law degree from the Université de Sherbrooke and a graduate degree in administrative law from the Université de Montréal. Carignan has worked as a lawyer since his admission to the Quebec Bar in 1988, specializing in civil litigation, labour relations, and health and social services law. He is coauthor of Loi sur les décrets de convention collective annotée, published by Wilson & Lafleur in 1990.

While practicing, Carignan also taught labour law administration at the Université de Montréal Faculty of Law and at the Université du Québec à Montréal. He also taught at the École nationale d'administration publique (ENAP).

== Political and public service career ==
In March 1994, Carignan was a founding member of the Action démocratique du Québec and active supporter until 2003. He acted as legislative counsel for the ADQ a number of times.

Carignan was elected mayor of Saint-Eustache in November 2000 a position he held until August 29, 2009, when he was called to the Senate of Canada.

After serving as chair of its justice and public safety commission, he became second vice-president of the Union des municipalités du Québec. In April 2008, he was appointed president of the Conseil sur les services policiers du Québec, an advisory body created to advise the Quebec Minister of Public Security on all policing matters. With his public safety expertise, Carignan went on to moderate and chair several seminars and workshops at a number of national conferences and symposia. From 2007 to 2009, he was president of the Centre for Expertise and Research on Infrastructures in Urban Areas (CERIU).

Carignan also played an active role in several committees and commissions in the Communauté métropolitaine de Montréal (CMM) and served as vice-warden of the Deux-Montagnes MRC and on the Conférence régionale des élus executive council. From 2005 to 2009, he was vice-president of both the Conseil intermunicipal de transport des Laurentides and the Association des Conseils intermunicipaux de transport du Québec.

Carignan has helped promote numerous charitable causes, sat on the boards of several social agencies in his region and created the Fondation Élite Saint-Eustache, which helps talented young people in his community.

He ran for the Conservatives in the 2008 federal election in Rivière-des-Mille-Îles

== Senate career ==
Since his appointment to the Senate in 2009, Carignan has served on the following committees:

- Standing Senate Committee on Legal and Constitutional Affairs
- Steering Committee of the Standing Senate Committee on Legal and Constitutional Affairs
- Standing Senate Committee on Internal Economy, Budgets and Administration
- Standing Senate Committee on Rules, Procedures and the Rights of Parliament

In May 2011, Marjory LeBreton, Leader of the Government in the Senate, appointed him Deputy Leader of the Government. In this role, Senator Carignan supports the Leader of the Government in managing the government's priorities in the Upper House. He also plays a key role in ensuring that parliamentary rules are followed during Senate debates, as well as assisting his Senate colleagues with any questions on parliamentary issues.

In September 2013, after two years to serve as deputy Leader of the Government, Carignan was named Government Leader in the Senate on August 30, 2013 upon the resignation of his predecessor, Marjory LeBreton. He was made a member of the Privy Council of Canada, though not of the Cabinet. However, from September 2013 to November 2015, he was a member of the Cabinet Committee on Operations. This Committee provides the day-to-day coordination of the government's agenda, including issues management, legislation and house planning, and communications.

As a result of the 2015 federal election in which the Conservative government was defeated, Carignan became the Leader of the Opposition in the Senate. He stepped down from his role as Conservative Leader in the Senate in 2017.

== Electoral record ==
2008 Canadian federal election: Rivière-des-Mille-Îles
Party	Candidate	Votes	%	±%	Expenditures
Bloc Québécois	Luc Desnoyers	23,216	45.69	.	$51,436
Conservative	Claude Carignan	9,911	19.50	.	$81,552
Liberal	Denis Joannette	8,823	17.36	.	$15,359
New Democratic	Normand Beaudet	6,741	13.26	.	$1,453
Green	Marie Martine Bédard	2,134	4.20	.	$3,054
Total valid votes		50,825	100.00		
Total rejected ballots		905			
Turnout		51,730	67.18		
Electors on the lists		77,006			
Sources: Official Results, Elections Canada and Financial Returns, Elections Canada.
