= Diane Finley =

Canadian politician

The Honourable Diane Finley PC
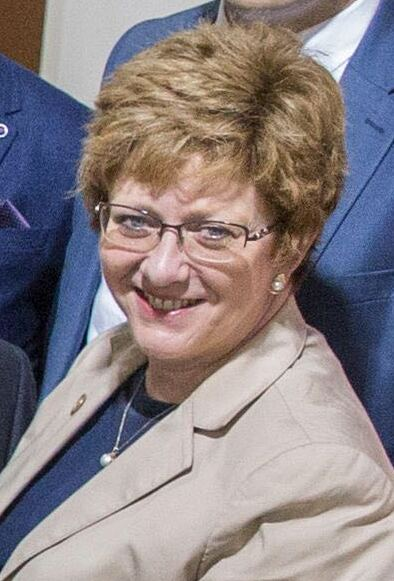
- Finley in May 2017

Minister of Public Works and Government Services
- In office July 15, 2013 – November 4, 2015
- Prime Minister: Stephen Harper
- Preceded by: Rona Ambrose
- Succeeded by: Judy Foote

Minister of Human Resources and Skills Development (Note: Office became known as "Minister of Human Resources and Social Development" from 2006 to 2007.)
- In office October 30, 2008 – July 14, 2013
- Prime Minister: Stephen Harper
- Preceded by: Monte Solberg
- Succeeded by: Jason Kenney
- In office February 2, 2006 – January 3, 2007
- Prime Minister: Stephen Harper
- Preceded by: Belinda Stronach
- Succeeded by: Monte Solberg

Minister of Citizenship and Immigration
- In office January 4, 2007 – October 29, 2008
- Prime Minister: Stephen Harper
- Preceded by: Monte Solberg
- Succeeded by: Jason Kenney

Conservative Party Caucus Liaison
- In office September 25, 2017 – September 2, 2020
- Leader: Andrew Scheer; Erin O'Toole
- Succeeded by: Tim Uppal

Member of Parliament for Haldimand—Norfolk
- In office June 28, 2004 – May 11, 2021
- Preceded by: Bob Speller
- Succeeded by: Leslyn Lewis

Personal details
- Born: October 3, 1957 (age 69) Hamilton, Ontario, Canada
- Party: Conservative
- Spouse: Doug Finley (died 2013)
- Profession: Businesswoman, corporate executive, management consultant, school administrator
- Website: dianefinley.ca

Diane Finley PC (born October 3, 1957) is a former Canadian politician. From 2006 through 2015, she served in the cabinet of Prime Minister Stephen Harper. Her ministerial portfolios included Minister of Human Resources and Skills Development, Minister of Public Works and Government Services, Minister Responsible for Canada Mortgage and Housing Corporation, or CMHC, and Minister of Citizenship and Immigration. She was a member of the House of Commons of Canada, representing the riding of Haldimand—Norfolk for the Conservative Party from 2004 to 2021. In August 2020, she announced that she would not be running in the 2021 Canadian federal election. She resigned from office on May 11, 2021.

== Personal life ==
Diane Finley was raised in Port Dover and Charlotteville in Norfolk County, Ontario, and has a Bachelor of Arts degree and a Masters in Business Administration from the University of Western Ontario. After graduation, she became the administrator of Western's French Immersion School. She then worked in a series of private and public sector jobs, in a variety of fields. She was named "one of Canada's future leaders" by the Governor-General's Study Conference 2000. As a child, she participated in Girl Guides of Canada youth programs.

Her husband was Doug Finley, a Senator from Ontario and former campaign manager and director of political operations for the Conservative Party of Canada. The pair met while Diane was working as a summer hire at Rolls-Royce where Doug was an executive.

In 2006, Finley announced that she has Graves' disease, a non-life-threatening thyroid condition that causes increased sensitivity to bright lights and forces her to wear tinted glasses.

== Political career ==
Long involved in politics of the Conservative Party and its predecessors, Finley first ran for public office in the 2004 federal election in the riding of Haldimand—Norfolk. She defeated Bob Speller, a Liberal cabinet minister, by 1,645 votes. After being re-elected in the 2006 election, she was appointed to the cabinet as Minister of Human Resources and Skills Development. An Order in Council transferred authority for Social Development Canada to her as well, and accordingly, she served under the style Minister of Human Resources and Social Development. She was shuffled from the Human Resources and Skills Development Canada to the Citizenship and Immigration Canada portfolio on January 4, 2007. The following year, Finley allegedly received threats from sex industry officials in relation to her support of Bill C-17, which sought to allow immigration officers to deny temporary visas to prospective strippers if they were suspected to be sex trafficking victims. Tim Lambrinos of the Adult Entertainment Association of Canada (AEAC) said that "it's not plausible" that any of the AEAC strip clubs were responsible for the threats.

Finley was re-elected in the 2008 election and resumed her former post as Minister of Human Resources and Skills Development. She was re-elected in the 2011 election with 50.9% of the vote in her riding.

In March 2015, a parliamentary ethics report on an affair linked to disgraced prime ministerial aide Nigel Wright found that Finley had breached conflict of interest rules in her capacity as minister by diverting funding to a favoured project in Markham whose promoter had close ties to the Conservative Party.

After winning her seat once more in the 2015 federal election, Finley announced that she would be running for the position of interim leader of the Conservative Party, after Stephen Harper's resignation from the post. She was passed over for interim leader and subsequently placed in Rona Ambrose's shadow cabinet.

She was re-elected in the 2019 federal election. On August 23, 2020, she announced that she would not seek re-election in the 2021 federal election. She resigned from the House of Commons on May 11, 2021. Leslyn Lewis was the Conservative candidate elected to succeed Finley in the 2021 federal election.

== Political views ==
Finley has promoted increased private-sector involvement in health services. She was the founder of Canada's largest publicly funded ambulance service company, Canadian Medical Response, and has been active in the Canadian Council for Public-Private Partnerships.

== Electoral record ==
2019 Canadian federal election: Haldimand—Norfolk
Party	Candidate	Votes	%	±%	Expenditures
Conservative	Diane Finley	28,018	46.75	+2.7	$71,248.92
Liberal	Kim Huffman	14,704	24.54	-12.1	$47,529.88
New Democratic	Adrienne Roberts	9,192	15.34	+1.7	$2,660.65
Green	Brooke Martin	4,878	8.14	+4.8	none listed
People's	Bob Forbes	1,234	2.06	-	$2,959.97
Veterans Coalition	Harold Stewart	1,083	1.81	-	none listed
Christian Heritage	Lily Eggink	817	1.36	-0.2	none listed
Total valid votes/expense limit		59,926	99.28		
Total rejected ballots		436	0.72		
Turnout		60,362	65.93		
Eligible voters		91,557			
Conservative hold		Swing		+7.4	
Source: Elections Canada

2015 Canadian federal election: Haldimand—Norfolk
Party	Candidate	Votes	%	±%	Expenditures
Conservative	Diane Finley	24,714	44.14	-6.80	$127,788.19
Liberal	Joan Mouland	20,487	36.59	+11.67	$72,346.01
New Democratic	John Harris	7,625	13.62	-6.36	$3,656.59
Green	Wayne Ettinger	1,857	3.32	+0.01	$12,277.23
Christian Heritage	David Bylsma	884	1.58	+0.72	$7,252.58
Independent	Dustin Wakeford	272	0.49	–	$12,267.19
Independent	Leslie Bory	151	0.27	–	$1,616.53
Total valid votes/expense limit		55,990	100.00		$219,180.63
Total rejected ballots		312	0.55		
Turnout		56,302	68.14		
Eligible voters		82,621			
Conservative hold		Swing		-9.24	
Source: Elections Canada

2011 Canadian federal election: Haldimand—Norfolk
Party	Candidate	Votes	%	±%	Expenditures
Conservative	Diane Finley	25,655	50.94	+10.11	–
Liberal	Bob Speller	12,549	24.92	-7.43	–
New Democratic	Ian Nichols	10,062	19.98	+8.45	–
Green	Anne Faulkner	1,665	3.31	-0.93	–
Christian Heritage	Steven Elgersma	435	0.86	-0.18	–
Total valid votes/expense limit		50,366	100.0	4.1	
Total rejected ballots		256	0.51	–	
Turnout		50,622	63.49		
Eligible voters		79,729	–	–	

2008 Canadian federal election: Haldimand—Norfolk
Party	Candidate	Votes	%	±%	Expenditures
Conservative	Diane Finley	19,657	40.83	-7.5	$67,583
Liberal	Eric Hoskins	15,577	32.35	-1.9	$72,913
New Democratic	Ian Nichols	5,549	11.53	-1.3	$5,509
Independent	Gary McHale	4,821	10.01	–	$22,798
Green	Stephana Johnston	2,041	4.24	+0.7	$2,581
Christian Heritage	Steven Elgersma	501	1.04	0.0	
Total valid votes/expense limit		48,146	100	$85,391	
Majority		4,080	8.48		
Total rejected ballots		248	0.51		
Turnout		48,394			

2006 Canadian federal election: Haldimand—Norfolk
Party	Candidate	Votes	%	±%
Conservative	Diane Finley	25,885	48.33	+6.1
Liberal	Bob Speller	18,363	34.29	-4.5
New Democratic	Valya Roberts	6,858	12.80	-1.6
Green	Carolyn Van Nort	1,894	3.54	+0.1
Christian Heritage	Steven Elgersma	559	1.04	-0.2
Turnout		53,559		
Conservative hold		Swing		+5.3

2004 Canadian federal election: Haldimand—Norfolk
Party	Candidate	Votes	%	±%
Conservative	Diane Finley	20,981	42.2	-6.2
Liberal	Bob Speller	19,336	38.8	-7.2
New Democratic	Carrie Sinkowski	7,143	14.4	+9.8
Green	Colin Jones	1,703	3.4	
Christian Heritage	Steven Elgersma	617	1.2	
Majority		1,645	3.3	
Turnout		49,780	63.3	
Conservative gain from Liberal		Swing		+1.0

28th Canadian Ministry (2006–2015) – Cabinet of Stephen Harper
Cabinet posts (4)
Predecessor	Office	Successor
Rona Ambrose	Minister of Public Works and Government Services; 2013–2015	Judy Foote
Monte Solberg	Minister of Human Resources and Skills Development; 2008–2013	Jason Kenney
Monte Solberg	Minister of Citizenship and Immigration; 2007–2008	Jason Kenney
Belinda Stronach	Minister of Human Resources and Skills Development; 2006–2007 styled as Minister of Human Resources and Social Development	Monte Solberg
