= Bob Speller =

Canadian politician (1956–2021)

The Honourable Bob Speller PC

Member of Parliament of Canada for Haldimand—Norfolk
- In office 1988–2004
- Preceded by: Bud Bradley
- Succeeded by: Diane Finley

Minister of Agriculture and Agri-Food
- In office December 12, 2003 – June 28, 2004
- Prime Minister: Paul Martin
- Preceded by: Lyle Vanclief
- Succeeded by: Andy Mitchell

Personal details
- Born: February 29, 1956 Hagersville, Ontario, Canada
- Died: December 16, 2021 (aged 65) near Waterford, Ontario, Canada
- Party: Liberal Party of Canada
- Spouse: Joan Mouland
- Children: Christopher and Victoria
- Profession: Businessman, consultant

Robert Speller, PC (February 29, 1956 – December 16, 2021) was a Canadian politician. A member of the Liberal Party of Canada, Speller was elected to the House of Commons of Canada four times from 1988 to 2000. He was defeated in 2004 by a 20,938 to 19,277 margin.

== Personal life ==
Speller was born in Hagersville, Ontario on February 29, 1956. In 1983, he married Joan Mouland, with whom he had a son, Christopher, and a daughter, Victoria. He died on December 16, 2021, at the age of 65 at a care facility near Waterford, Ontario, after an illness.

== Career ==
Speller was first elected in the 1988 Canadian federal election as a member of the Liberal Party, defeating incumbent Bud Bradley by only 209 votes. Brian Mulroney's Progressive Conservatives won the election, however, relegating Speller to opposition Member of Parliament (MP). As an opposition MP, Speller was associate trade critic, youth critic and chair of the Liberal Rural Caucus.

Speller was re-elected in 1993, 1997 and 2000, as a member of the winning party. Jean Chrétien's Liberals won three successive elections. Speller served on the House of Commons Standing Committee on Agriculture and Agri-Food (1994–1995), served on the Canadian Parliamentary Association International Executive Committee, served on the Parliamentary Steel Caucus (1993, 1994, 1998), served on the Joint Inter-Parliamentary Council, and was chair of the Sub-committee on Trade, Trade Disputes and Investment and the Commonwealth Parliamentary Association (Canadian Branch).

On December 12, 2003, incoming Prime Minister Paul Martin named Speller the federal Minister of Agriculture and Agri-Food.

Speller represented the constituency of Haldimand—Norfolk—Brant until riding lines were redrawn prior to the June 2004 federal election. In his new riding of Haldimand—Norfolk, Speller lost the election to Conservative candidate Diane Finley, and formally left cabinet the following July.

In June 2005, Prime Minister Paul Martin asked Speller to consider running in the next federal election. Speller ran in the following general election, but was defeated again. Speller did not run in the 2008 federal election but ran again in the 2011 federal election.

27th Canadian Ministry (2003–2006) – Cabinet of Paul Martin
Cabinet post (1)
Predecessor	Office	Successor
Lyle Vanclief	Minister of Agriculture and Agri-Food; 2003–2004	Andy Mitchell
