= Haldimand—Norfolk (federal electoral district) =

Federal electoral district in Ontario, Canada

Coordinates: 42.92°N 80.05°W

Ontario electoral district
- Interactive map of riding boundaries from the 2004 federal election

Federal electoral district
- Legislature: House of Commons
MP
Leslyn Lewis
Conservative
- District created: 2003
- First contested: 2004
- Last contested: 2021
- District webpage: profile, map

Demographics
- Population (2011): 108,051
- Electors (2015): 81,773
- Area (km²): 3,061
- Pop. density (per km²): 35.3
- Census division(s): Haldimand, Norfolk
- Census subdivision(s): Norfolk, Haldimand

Haldimand—Norfolk is a federal electoral district in Ontario, Canada, that has been represented in the House of Commons of Canada from 1979 to 1997, and since 2004. The current Member of Parliament (MP) is Conservative Leslyn Lewis.

== Geography ==
This riding is located in rural Southern Ontario, and comprises Haldimand and Norfolk Counties, except for parts of the Six Nations and New Credit Indian reserves. The total area is 3,073 km^{2}. There are 205 polling divisions. Neighbouring districts include Ancaster—Dundas—Flamborough—Westdale, Brant, Elgin—Middlesex—London, Niagara West—Glanbrook, Oxford, and Welland.

== Demographics ==
According to the 2021 Canadian census

Languages: 89.5% English, 1.9% German, 1.0% Dutch
Religions: 62.1% Christian (20.4% Catholic, 8.1% United Church, 6.0% Anglican, 3.5% Baptist, 2.6% Presbyterian, 2.1% Reformed, 2.0% Anabaptist, 1.5% Pentecostal, 1.4% Lutheran, 14.5% Other), 36.4% None
Median income: $40,800 (2020)
Average income: $49,480 (2020)

Panethnic groups in Haldimand—Norfolk (2011−2021)
Panethnic group	2021		2016		2011	
Panethnic group	Pop.	%	Pop.	%	Pop.	%
European (Note: Statistic includes all persons that did not make up part of a visible minority or an indigenous identity.)	105,950	92.3%	101,870	94.81%	100,310	95%
Indigenous	4,005	3.49%	3,335	3.1%	3,410	3.23%
African	1,405	1.22%	800	0.74%	575	0.54%
South Asian	965	0.84%	330	0.31%	175	0.17%
Southeast Asian (Note: Statistic includes total responses of "Filipino" and "Southeast Asian" under visible minority section on census.)	725	0.63%	375	0.35%	275	0.26%
East Asian (Note: Statistic includes total responses of "Chinese", "Korean", and "Japanese" under visible minority section on census.)	575	0.5%	335	0.31%	425	0.4%
Latin American	450	0.39%	190	0.18%	120	0.11%
Middle Eastern (Note: Statistic includes total responses of "West Asian" and "Arab" under visible minority section on census.)	285	0.25%	80	0.07%	30	0.03%
Other/multiracial (Note: Statistic includes total responses of "Visible minority, n.i.e." and "Multiple visible minorities" under visible minority section on census.)	445	0.39%	135	0.13%	255	0.24%
Total responses	114,790	98.36%	107,450	97.99%	105,585	97.72%
Total population	116,706	100%	109,652	100%	108,051	100%
Notes: Totals greater than 100% due to multiple origin responses. Demographics based on 2012 Canadian federal electoral redistribution riding boundaries.

== History ==
Haldimand—Norfolk has existed as a federal electoral district twice. It was first created in 1976 from the riding of Norfolk—Haldimand. Haldimand—Norfolk was later abolished in 1996, and was mostly replaced by Haldimand—Norfolk—Brant. It was recreated in 2003 from 12.0% of Erie—Lincoln and 88.0% of Haldimand—Norfolk—Brant.

From its first election in 1979 to 1988, Haldimand—Norfolk was represented by the Progressive Conservative Bud Bradley. In 1988, Liberal Bob Speller defeated Bradley. Speller went on to serve as Minister of Agriculture. In 2004, Haldimand—Norfolk elected Conservative candidate Diane Finley, who was re-elected in 2008 and 2011. After being re-elected in the 2006 election, Finley was appointed to the cabinet as Minister of Human Resources and Skills Development. She was shuffled from the Human Resources and Skills Development Canada to the Citizenship and Immigration Canada portfolio on January 4, 2007. After her 2008 election victory she resumed her former post as Minister of Human Resources and Skills Development in the Conservative minority government, a post she continued to hold until 2013.

This riding was left unchanged after the 2012 electoral redistribution.

=== Members of Parliament ===
This riding has elected the following members of Parliament:

Parliament	Years	Member	Party
Haldimand—Norfolk; Riding created from Norfolk—Haldimand
31st	1979–1980	Bud Bradley	Progressive Conservative
32nd	1980–1984	Bud Bradley	Progressive Conservative
33rd	1984–1988	Bud Bradley	Progressive Conservative
34th	1988–1993	Bob Speller	Liberal
35th	1993–1997	Bob Speller	Liberal
Riding dissolved into Haldimand—Norfolk—Brant
Riding re-created from Haldimand—Norfolk—Brant and Erie—Lincoln
38th	2004–2006	Diane Finley	Conservative
39th	2006–2008	Diane Finley	Conservative
40th	2008–2011	Diane Finley	Conservative
41st	2011–2015	Diane Finley	Conservative
42nd	2015–2019	Diane Finley	Conservative
43rd	2019–2021	Diane Finley	Conservative
44th	2021–2025	Leslyn Lewis	Conservative
45th	2025–present	Leslyn Lewis	Conservative

== Election results ==
=== 2003–present ===
View source data.
Graph of election results in Haldimand—Norfolk (since 2004, minor parties that never got 2% of the vote or didn't run consistently are omitted)

2025 Canadian federal election
Party	Candidate	Votes	%	±%	Expenditures
Conservative	Leslyn Lewis	41,218	57.56	+10.17	
Liberal	Colin Walsh	26,040	36.37	+8.85	
New Democratic	Shannon Horner-Shepherd	2,412	3.37	–9.92	
Green	Nathan Hawkins	750	1.05	N/A	
People's	Henry Geissler	657	0.92	–9.58	
Christian Heritage	Lily Eggink	529	0.74	–0.15	
Total valid votes/expense limit		71,606	99.50		
Total rejected ballots		360	0.50		
Turnout		71,966	72.47	+5.28	
Eligible voters		99,311			
Conservative hold		Swing		+0.66	
Source: Elections Canada

2021 Canadian federal election
Party	Candidate	Votes	%	±%	Expenditures
Conservative	Leslyn Lewis	29,664	47.39	+0.64	$95,262.97
Liberal	Karen Matthews	17,224	27.52	+2.98	$68,413.90
New Democratic	Meghan Piironen	8,320	13.29	-2.05	$1,184.27
People's	Ken Gilpin	6,570	10.50	+8.44	$4,451.20
Christian Heritage	Charles Lugosi	559	0.89	-0.47	$8,363.12
Veterans Coalition	George McMorrow	255	0.41	-1.40	$0.00
Total valid votes/expense limit		62,505	–	–	$121,858.73
Total rejected ballots		425			
Turnout		63,017	67.18	+1.25	
Eligible voters		93,802			
Conservative hold		Swing		-2.34	
Source: Elections Canada

2019 Canadian federal election
Party	Candidate	Votes	%	±%	Expenditures
Conservative	Diane Finley	28,018	46.75	+2.7	$71,248.92
Liberal	Kim Huffman	14,704	24.54	-12.1	$47,529.88
New Democratic	Adrienne Roberts	9,192	15.34	+1.7	$2,660.65
Green	Brooke Martin	4,878	8.14	+4.8	none listed
People's	Bob Forbes	1,234	2.06	-	$2,959.97
Veterans Coalition	Harold Stewart	1,083	1.81	-	none listed
Christian Heritage	Lily Eggink	817	1.36	-0.2	none listed
Total valid votes/expense limit		59,926	99.28		
Total rejected ballots		436	0.72		
Turnout		60,362	65.93		
Eligible voters		91,557			
Conservative hold		Swing		+7.4	
Source: Elections Canada

2015 Canadian federal election
Party	Candidate	Votes	%	±%	Expenditures
Conservative	Diane Finley	24,714	44.14	-6.80	$127,788.19
Liberal	Joan Mouland	20,487	36.59	+11.67	$72,346.01
New Democratic	John Harris	7,625	13.62	-6.36	$3,656.59
Green	Wayne Ettinger	1,857	3.32	+0.01	$12,277.23
Christian Heritage	David Bylsma	884	1.58	+0.72	$7,252.58
Independent	Dustin Wakeford	272	0.49	–	$12,267.19
Independent	Leslie Bory	151	0.27	–	$1,616.53
Total valid votes/expense limit		55,990	100.00		$219,180.63
Total rejected ballots		312	0.55		
Turnout		56,302	68.14		
Eligible voters		82,621			
Conservative hold		Swing		-9.24	
Source: Elections Canada

2011 Canadian federal election
Party	Candidate	Votes	%	±%	Expenditures
Conservative	Diane Finley	25,655	50.94	+10.11	–
Liberal	Bob Speller	12,549	24.92	-7.43	–
New Democratic	Ian Nichols	10,062	19.98	+8.45	–
Green	Anne Faulkner	1,665	3.31	-0.93	–
Christian Heritage	Steven Elgersma	435	0.86	-0.18	–
Total valid votes/expense limit		50,366	100.0	4.1	
Total rejected ballots		256	0.51	–	
Turnout		50,622	63.49		
Eligible voters		79,729	–	–	

2008 Canadian federal election
Party	Candidate	Votes	%	±%	Expenditures
Conservative	Diane Finley	19,657	40.83	-7.5	$67,583
Liberal	Eric Hoskins	15,577	32.35	-1.9	$72,913
New Democratic	Ian Nichols	5,549	11.53	-1.3	$5,509
Independent	Gary McHale	4,821	10.01	–	$22,798
Green	Stephana Johnston	2,041	4.24	+0.7	$2,581
Christian Heritage	Steven Elgersma	501	1.04	0.0	
Total valid votes/expense limit		48,146	100	$85,391	
Majority		4,080	8.48		
Total rejected ballots		248	0.51		
Turnout		48,394			

2006 Canadian federal election: Haldimand—Norfolk
Party	Candidate	Votes	%	±%
Conservative	Diane Finley	25,885	48.33	+6.1
Liberal	Bob Speller	18,363	34.29	-4.5
New Democratic	Valya Roberts	6,858	12.80	-1.6
Green	Carolyn Van Nort	1,894	3.54	+0.1
Christian Heritage	Steven Elgersma	559	1.04	-0.2
Turnout		53,559		
Conservative hold		Swing		+5.3

2004 Canadian federal election
Party	Candidate	Votes	%	±%
Conservative	Diane Finley	20,981	42.2	-6.2
Liberal	Bob Speller	19,336	38.8	-7.2
New Democratic	Carrie Sinkowski	7,143	14.4	+9.8
Green	Colin Jones	1,703	3.4	
Christian Heritage	Steven Elgersma	617	1.2	
Majority		1,645	3.3	
Turnout		49,780	63.3	
Conservative gain from Liberal		Swing		+1.0

Poll-by-poll results

Change from 2000 is based on redistributed results. Conservative Party change is based on the combination of Canadian Alliance and Progressive Conservative Party totals.

From 1996 until 2003, Haldimand—Norfolk did not exist as a federal riding, and was mostly represented by Haldimand—Norfolk—Brant. Results for 1997 and 2000 can be found on that page.

=== 1976–1996 ===
View source data.
Graph of election results in Haldimand—Norfolk (1979-1993, minor parties that never got 2% of the vote or didn't run consistently are omitted)

1993 Canadian federal election
Party	Candidate	Votes	%	±%
Liberal	Bob Speller	24,100	53.6	+15.6
Reform	Ken Gilpen	10,563	23.5	
Progressive Conservative	Jack Cronkwright	7,273	16.2	-21.4
New Democratic	Herman Plas	1,667	3.7	-11.4
National	Ross Bateman	1,340	3.0	
Total		44,943	100.0	

1988 Canadian federal election
Party	Candidate	Votes	%	±%
Liberal	Bob Speller	16,921	38.0	+11.7
Progressive Conservative	Bud Bradley	16,712	37.6	-21.5
New Democratic	Eric Butt	6,736	15.1	+1.9
Christian Heritage	Gary Sytsma	3,969	8.9	
Libertarian	David Yaki	162	0.4	
Total		44,500	100.0	

1984 Canadian federal election
Party	Candidate	Votes	%	±%
Progressive Conservative	Bud Bradley	27,296	59.0	+17.0
Liberal	Edith Fuller	12,161	26.3	-15.4
New Democratic	Bill Jefferies	6,138	13.3	-2.4
Independent	Martin J. Weber	656	1.4	
Total valid votes		46,251	100.0	

1980 Canadian federal election
Party	Candidate	Votes	%	±%
Progressive Conservative	Bud Bradley	18,600	42.0	-7.6
Liberal	Art Renn	18,461	41.7	+6.7
New Democratic	Norm, Walpole	6,937	15.7	+0.9
Social Credit	Charley Harris	284	0.6	0.0
Total valid votes		44,282	100.0	

1979 Canadian federal election
Party	Candidate	Votes	%
Progressive Conservative	Bud Bradley	22,655	49.6
Liberal	Art Renn	15,990	35.0
New Democratic	Joe Clark	6,762	14.8
Social Credit	William Triska	309	0.7
Total valid votes		45,716	100.0

== Student vote results ==
2025 Haldimand—Norfolk student vote
43.95%	25.12%	10.44%	10.06%	6.78%	3.66%
Conservative	Liberal	Green	NDP	CHP	PPC

== See also ==
- List of Canadian electoral districts
- Historical federal electoral districts of Canada
