= Leslyn Lewis =

Canadian lawyer and politician

Leslyn Lewis MP
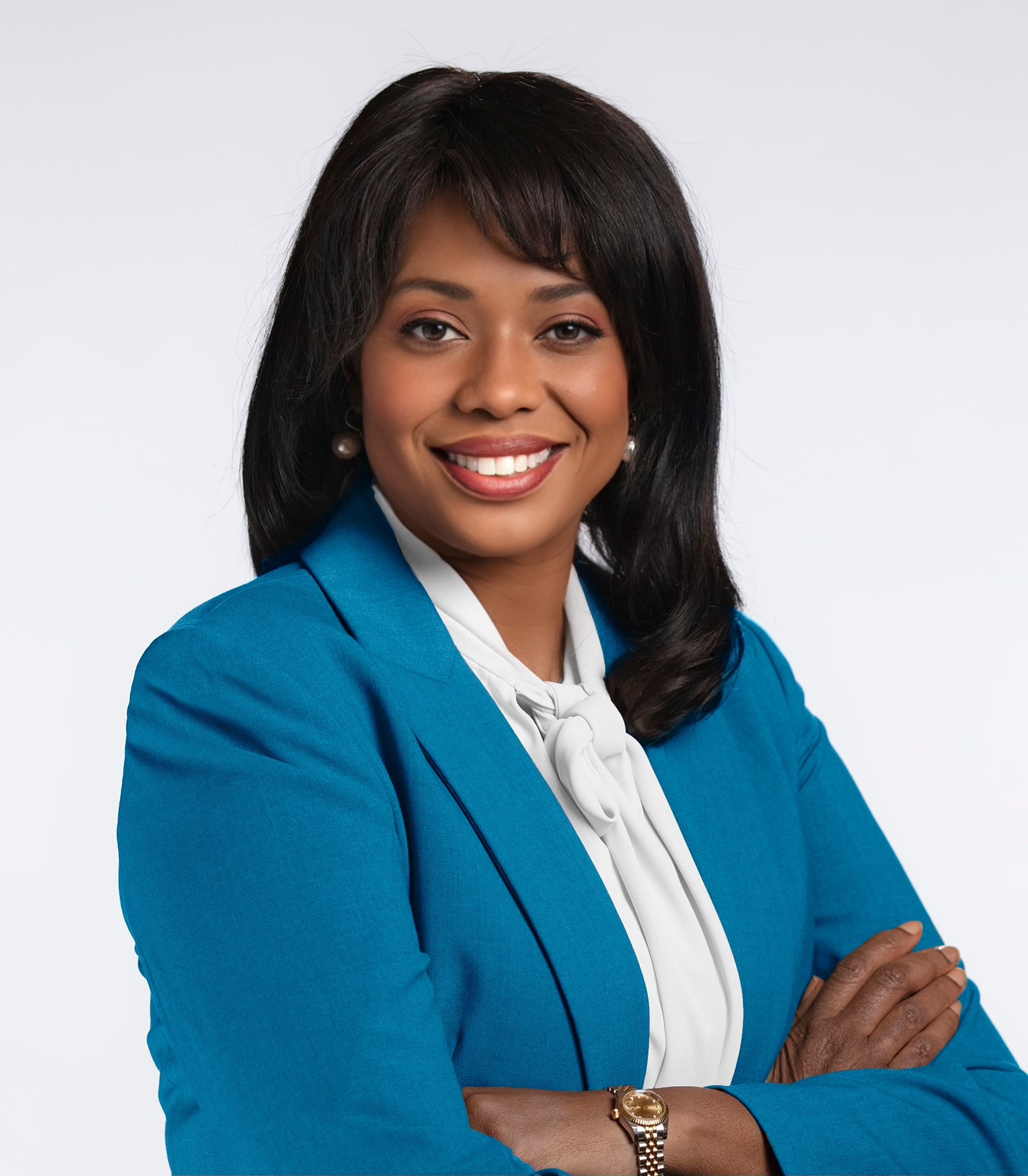
- Lewis in 2020

Member of Parliament for Haldimand—Norfolk
- Incumbent
- Assumed office September 20, 2021
- Preceded by: Diane Finley

Personal details
- Born: Leslyn Ann Lewis; December 2, 1970 (age 55) Saint Andrew, Surrey, Jamaica
- Party: Conservative
- Education: Trinity College, Toronto (BA); York University (MES, JD, PhD)
- Occupation: Politician; lawyer
- Website: www.leslynlewis.ca

Leslyn Ann Lewis MP (born December 2, 1970) is a Canadian politician and lawyer who has served as the member of Parliament (MP) for Haldimand—Norfolk since 2021. A member of the Conservative Party, Lewis contested the party leadership in the leadership elections of 2020 and 2022, placing third both times. She was the first visible minority woman to run for the federal Conservative Party leadership. She is known for her socially conservative views.

== Early life and education ==
Leslyn Ann Lewis was born in Jamaica, and she immigrated to Canada at age five and grew up in East York, Ontario.

Lewis graduated with a Bachelor of Arts with high distinction from the University of Toronto as a student of Trinity College. She also holds a Master of Environmental Studies from York University with a concentration in business and environment from the Schulich School of Business, and a Juris Doctor and PhD in international law from Osgoode Hall Law School.

== Legal career ==
Lewis has practiced law since approximately 2000 and is the managing partner of Lewis Law in Scarborough, specializing in commercial litigation and international trade practice, with a focus on energy policy. She has hosted the television show Law Matters.

In 2018 she was appointed by the province of Ontario to the board of the Ontario Trillium Foundation and was later named to the foundation's committee responsible for dispensing funds for youth programs.

== Political career ==
=== 2015 federal election ===
Lewis began her political career in the riding of Markham—Stouffville, where she was vice president and a primary fundraiser of the Conservative electoral district association while Paul Calandra was MP.

In the 2015 federal election Conservative leader Stephen Harper appointed her as a replacement candidate to run in the riding of Scarborough—Rouge Park only a few weeks before the vote after the previous Conservative candidate had been forced to withdraw following a scandal. An article in the National Post referred to Lewis as a “high-quality substitute". She placed second to Liberal candidate Gary Anandasangaree, receiving 13,587 votes.

=== 2020 Conservative Party leadership candidate ===
In February 2020, Lewis was confirmed as an official leadership contestant for the Conservative Party of Canada, following the resignation of Andrew Scheer as leader in December 2019. Had she been successful, she would have been the first visible minority woman to lead any of the three major federal Canadian parties. (Note: She is the third visible minority woman to run for the leadership of any major national Canadian party, after Rosemary Brown (NDP in 1975) and Hedy Fry (Liberal in 2006).)

Her platform was described as socially conservative. While she considers conversion therapy "an atrocious thing", she raised concerns about the Canadian government's proposed ban, citing an unclear definition that risks penalizing conversations with parents or religious leaders. She stated that while she personally defines marriage as between a man and a woman, she would not roll back existing legislation redefining marriage in Canada. She has stated that she would like to make marijuana access more restrictive and that she thinks reactions to climate change are overblown "in some respects". She has publicly described herself as "pro-life, no hidden agenda" and as leader would have the Conservative Party move to ban sex-selective abortion and coerced abortion, increase government funding for crisis pregnancy centres (which provide alternatives to abortion), and she would end foreign aid funding for abortion. Her candidacy has been endorsed by anti-abortion advocacy groups including the Campaign Life Coalition.

She opposed carbon taxes and supports promoting green technology as an alternative policy.

Despite Lewis leading the second ballot on the popular vote, she was eliminated after placing third in points. Erin O'Toole was elected.

=== 2021 federal election and 44th Parliament ===
On August 25, 2020, Lewis announced that she would be running for a seat in the House of Commons in an undisclosed riding in the 2021 Canadian federal election. On September 15, 2020, she formally announced that she would be seeking the Conservative nomination in Haldimand—Norfolk. She was acclaimed as the Conservative candidate in the riding the next month. On September 20, 2021, Lewis won the seat for the Conservative Party in the 2021 Canadian federal election.

Following the election, Lewis stated her opposition to COVID-19 vaccine mandates for MPs and questioned COVID-19 vaccines for children.

=== 2022 Conservative Party leadership candidate ===
Lewis announced on March 8, 2022, that she would again run for the leadership of the Conservative Party. Lewis ran on a similar campaign agenda, championing socially conservative causes like a ban on sex-selective abortion and coerced abortion, providing funding for crisis pregnancy centres and ending the overseas funding of abortions. On September 10, 2022, Lewis lost to Carleton MP Pierre Poilievre on the first ballot, garnering 9.69% of the vote.

=== Shadow cabinet roles ===
In November 2021, Lewis was not appointed to the Conservative shadow cabinet by Erin O'Toole.

In October 2022, Lewis was appointed to Poilievre's shadow cabinet as infrastructure critic.

In July 2026, Lewis was made Conservative Shadow Minister for Digital Government and Artificial Intelligence.

=== Activities ===
In November 2022, Lewis announced the relaunch of the Canadian Israel Allies Caucus. Leslyn Lewis served as chair of the Canadian Parliamentary Israel Allies Caucus and was succeeded by John Williamson. The caucus is a member of the Israel Allies Foundation.

In January 2024, Lewis officially authorized a House of Commons e-petition for Canada to withdraw from the United Nations and UN-affiliated groups such as the World Health Organization and promoted it on her social media. According to the petition's initiator, a resident of Burnaby, British Columbia, the final petition was edited by Lewis's office before it was posted to the Commons website.

== Personal life ==
Lewis married her husband in 1998. They have four children together, and have lived in Dunnville since 2021. They previously resided in Greenwood, within the city of Pickering in Ontario.

=== Awards ===
In May 2019 she was awarded a Harry Jerome Award for Professional Excellence by the Black Business and Professional Association.

== Electoral record ==
=== Federal elections ===
2025 Canadian federal election: Haldimand—Norfolk
Party	Candidate	Votes	%	±%	Expenditures
Conservative	Leslyn Lewis	41,218	57.56	+10.17	
Liberal	Colin Walsh	26,040	36.37	+8.85	
New Democratic	Shannon Horner-Shepherd	2,412	3.37	–9.92	
Green	Nathan Hawkins	750	1.05	N/A	
People's	Henry Geissler	657	0.92	–9.58	
Christian Heritage	Lily Eggink	529	0.74	–0.15	
Total valid votes/expense limit		71,606	99.50		
Total rejected ballots		360	0.50		
Turnout		71,966	72.47	+5.28	
Eligible voters		99,311			
Conservative hold		Swing		+0.66	
Source: Elections Canada

2021 Canadian federal election: Haldimand—Norfolk
Party	Candidate	Votes	%	±%	Expenditures
Conservative	Leslyn Lewis	29,664	47.39	+0.64	$95,262.97
Liberal	Karen Matthews	17,224	27.52	+2.98	$68,413.90
New Democratic	Meghan Piironen	8,320	13.29	-2.05	$1,184.27
People's	Ken Gilpin	6,570	10.50	+8.44	$4,451.20
Christian Heritage	Charles Lugosi	559	0.89	-0.47	$8,363.12
Veterans Coalition	George McMorrow	255	0.41	-1.40	$0.00
Total valid votes/expense limit		62,505	–	–	$121,858.73
Total rejected ballots		425			
Turnout		63,017	67.18	+1.25	
Eligible voters		93,802			
Conservative hold		Swing		-2.34	
Source: Elections Canada

2015 Canadian federal election: Scarborough—Rouge Park
Party	Candidate	Votes	%	±%	Expenditures
Liberal	Gary Anandasangaree	29,913	60.24	+25.48	$144,189.04
Conservative	Leslyn Lewis	13,587	27.36	-4.23	$59,291.73
New Democratic	KM Shanthikumar	5,145	10.36	-20.63	$58,736.40
Green	Calvin Winter	1,010	2.03	-0.36	$1,457.51
Total valid votes/expense limit		49,655	100.0	–	$204,974.26
Total rejected ballots		235	0.47	New	
Turnout		49,890	69.98	New	
Eligible voters		71,291			
Source: Elections Canada

=== Conservative Party of Canada leadership elections ===
Conservative Leadership Election, September 10, 2022 First and only ballot
Candidate	Votes cast		Points won	
Pierre Poilievre	295,285	70.70%	22,993.42	68.15%
Jean Charest	48,650	11.65%	5,421.62	16.07%
Leslyn Lewis	46,374	11.10%	3,269.54	9.69%
Roman Baber	22,381	5.36%	1,696.76	5.03%
Total	412,690	98.81%	33,737.99	98.94%
Sources: Conservative Party of Canada

2020 Conservative Party of Canada leadership results by ballot
Candidate	1st ballot				2nd ballot				3rd ballot			
Candidate	Votes cast	%	Points allocated	%	Votes cast	%	Points allocated	%	Votes cast	%	Points allocated	%
Erin O'Toole	51,258	29.39%	10,681.40	31.60%	56,907	33.20%	11,903.69	35.22%	90,635	58.86%	19,271.74	57.02%
Peter MacKay	52,851	30.30%	11,328.55	33.52%	54,165	31.60%	11,756.01	34.78%	63,356	41.14%	14,528.26	42.98%
Leslyn Lewis	43,017	24.67%	6,925.38	20.49%	60,316	35.20%	10,140.30	30.00%	Eliminated			
Derek Sloan	27,278	15.64%	4,864.67	14.39%	Eliminated							
Total	174,404	100%	33,800	100%	171,388	100%	33,800	100%	153,991	100%	33,800	100%
