= Bud Bradley =

Canadian politician (1938–2022)

Member of Parliament for Haldimand—Norfolk
- In office 1979–1988
- Preceded by: Riding established
- Succeeded by: Bob Speller

Personal details
- Born: 30 April 1938 Niagara Falls, Ontario, Canada
- Died: 18 March 2022 (age 83)
- Party: Progressive Conservative
- Profession: Politician; dentist

T. A. Bud Bradley (30 April 1938 – 18 March 2022) was a Canadian politician who served as Progressive Conservative party member of the House of Commons of Canada. He was a dentist by career.

Born in Niagara Falls, Ontario, Bradley won the seat for the Haldimand—Norfolk electoral district in the 1979 federal election and was re-elected there in the 1980 and 1984 federal elections. In the 1988 federal election, he was defeated by Bob Speller of the Liberal party. Bradley served in the 31st, 32nd and 33rd Canadian Parliaments.

Bradley died on March 18, 2022, at the age of 83.
