= Luc Berthold =

Canadian politician (born 1966)

Luc Berthold MP
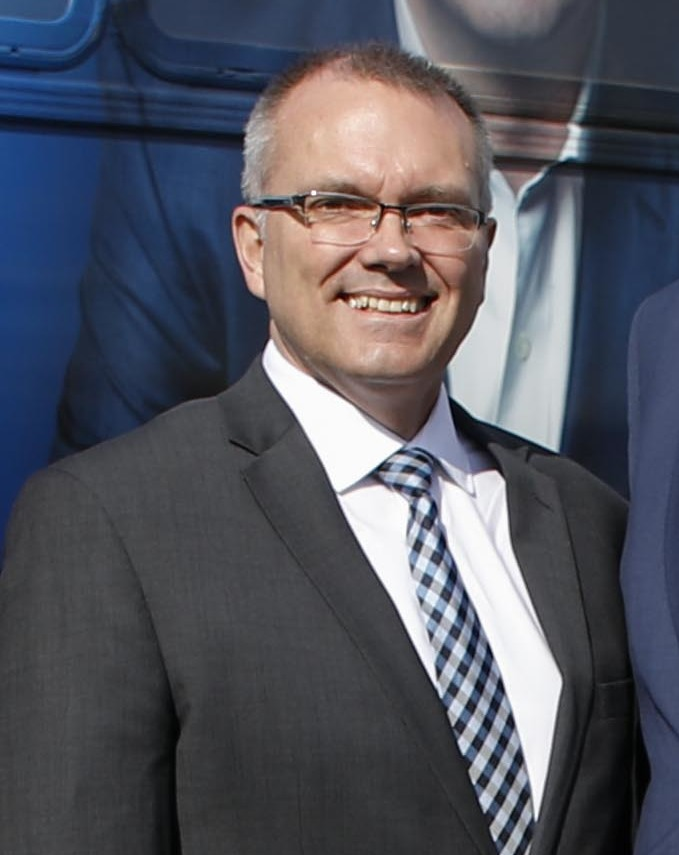
- Berthold in October 2019

Deputy Leader of the Opposition
- In office February 6, 2022 – September 13, 2022
- Leader: Candice Bergen
- Preceded by: Candice Bergen
- Succeeded by: Tim Uppal; Melissa Lantsman

Deputy Leader of the Conservative Party
- In office February 6, 2022 – September 13, 2022
- President: Robert Batherson
- Leader: Candice Bergen (interim)
- Preceded by: Candice Bergen
- Succeeded by: Tim Uppal; Melissa Lantsman

Conservative Party Quebec Lieutenant
- In office February 6, 2022 – September 13, 2022
- Leader: Candice Bergen (interim)
- Preceded by: Alain Rayes
- Succeeded by: Pierre Paul-Hus

Shadow Minister of Health
- In office November 8, 2021 – September 13, 2022
- Leader: Erin O'Toole; Candice Bergen (interim)
- Shadowing: Jean-Yves Duclos
- Preceded by: Michelle Rempel Garner
- Succeeded by: Stephen Ellis

Shadow President of the Treasury Board
- In office September 8, 2020 – November 8, 2021
- Leader: Erin O'Toole
- Shadowing: Jean-Yves Duclos
- Preceded by: Tim Uppal
- Succeeded by: Kelly McCauley

Official Opposition Critic for Agriculture and Agri-Food
- In office August 30, 2017 – September 11, 2019
- Leader: Andrew Scheer
- Shadowing: Lawrence MacAulay; Marie-Claude Bibeau
- Preceded by: David Anderson
- Succeeded by: John Barlow

Member of Parliament for Mégantic—L'Érable—Lotbinière Mégantic—L'Érable (2015–2025)
- Incumbent
- Assumed office October 19, 2015
- Preceded by: Christian Paradis

Mayor of Thetford Mines
- In office 2006–2013
- Preceded by: Normand Laliberté
- Succeeded by: Marc-Alexandre Brousseau

Personal details
- Born: 1966 (age 59–60) Sherbrooke, Quebec, Canada
- Party: Conservative
- Other political affiliations: Quebec Liberal
- Profession: Political aide

Luc Berthold MP (French pronunciation: [lyk bɛʁtɔld]; born 1966) is a Canadian politician who was elected to represent the riding of Mégantic—L'Érable in the House of Commons in the 2015 election.

On February 6, 2022, Berthold was appointed Deputy Leader of the Conservative Party by interim leader Candice Bergen. Berthold was also named the party's Quebec lieutenant, replacing Alain Rayes.

== Electoral record ==
2025 Canadian federal election: Mégantic—L'Érable—Lotbinière
** Preliminary results — Not yet official **
Party	Candidate	Votes	%	±%	Expenditures
Conservative	Luc Berthold	34,418	58.73	+2.47	
Liberal	Charles McKaig	12,585	21.47	+7.84	
Bloc Québécois	Réjean Hurteau	9,579	16.34	–3.73	
New Democratic	Gabriel D'Astous	1,086	1.85	–0.97	
People's	Marek Spacek	716	1.22	–2.39	
Christian Heritage	Yves Gilbert	224	0.38	N/A	
Total valid votes/expense limit					
Total rejected ballots					
Turnout		58,608	69.06		
Eligible voters		84,864			
Conservative hold		Swing		–2.69	
Source: Elections Canada

2021 Canadian federal election: Mégantic—L'Érable
Party	Candidate	Votes	%	±%	Expenditures
Conservative	Luc Berthold	26,121	56.3	+7.1	$54,323.16
Bloc Québécois	Éric Labonté	9,318	20.1	-5.7	$15,275.53
Liberal	Adam Lukofsky	6,329	13.6	-2.0	$13,729.57
People's	Jonathan Gagnon	1,677	3.6	+1.9	$0.00
New Democratic	Mathieu Boisvert	1,308	2.8	-1.3	$0.48
Free	Real Pepin	680	1.5	N/A	$1,772.40
Green	Emilie Hamel	592	1.3	-1.3	$0.00
Independent	Gloriane Blais	403	0.9	N/A	$8,124.07
Total valid votes/expense limit		46,428	98.3	–	$107,531.72
Total rejected ballots		785	1.7		
Turnout		47,213	65.4		
Registered voters		72,179			
Conservative hold		Swing		+6.4	
Source: Elections Canada

2019 Canadian federal election: Mégantic—L'Érable
Party	Candidate	Votes	%	±%	Expenditures
Conservative	Luc Berthold	23,392	49.2	+13.78	$46,958.47
Bloc Québécois	Priscilla Corbeil	12,249	25.8	+13.45	$4,851.59
Liberal	Isabelle Grégoire	7,388	15.6	-12.54	$15,319.47
New Democratic	Mathieu Boisvert	1,936	4.1	-17.86	none listed
Green	Nicole Charette	1,258	2.6	+0.47	$0.00
People's	Marie Claude Lauzier	812	1.7		$1,571.93
Rhinoceros	Damien Roy	256	0.5		none listed
Independent	Jean Paradis	217	0.5		$15,319.47
Total valid votes/expense limit		47,508	100.0		
Total rejected ballots		898			
Turnout		48,406	68.5		
Eligible voters		70,683			
Conservative hold		Swing		+0.17	
Source: Elections Canada

2015 Canadian federal election: Mégantic—L'Érable
Party	Candidate	Votes	%	±%	Expenditures
Conservative	Luc Berthold	16,749	35.42	-13.72	$80,017.18
Liberal	David Berthiaume	13,308	28.14	+22.17	$15,610.11
New Democratic	Jean-François Delisle	10,386	21.96	-4.30	$59,606.77
Bloc Québécois	Virginie Provost	5,838	12.35	-4.26	$4,049.48
Green	Justin Gervais	1,006	2.13	+0.65	–
Total valid votes/Expense limit		47,287	100.0		$204,975.86
Total rejected ballots		941	–	–	
Turnout		48,228	67.4%	–	
Eligible voters		71,469			
Conservative hold		Swing		-17.94	
Source: Elections Canada

2009 Thetford Mines mayoral election
Candidate	Vote	%
Luc Berthold (X)	8,777	86.1
Bruno Roy	1,418	13.9
