= Tim Lambrinos =

Lobbyist

- Citizenship: Canada
- Occupation: Lobbyist
- Employer: Adult Entertainment Association of Canada
- Organization: Exotic Dancers Association of Canada

Tim Lambrinos is the executive director of the Adult Entertainment Association of Canada (AEAC).

== Activities ==
Tim Lambrinos is the executive director of the Adult Entertainment Association of Canada (AEAC) and is a registered lobbyist in Toronto. He is also a member of the Exotic Dancers Association of Canada and chairs the Arts and Heritage Committee of the Toronto business improvement area. In his role with the AEAC, Lambrinos represents the interests of strip clubs to the public. In 2007, he made an accusation against the government, saying government officials were alleging "that exotic dancing is considered to be humiliating and degrading work," an assertion that Lambrinos called "most offensive." Starting in 2004, strippers working at AEAC strip clubs began petitioning the AEAC for free locker storage space for their personal property, and, in 2010, Lambrinos announced that the fight had resulted in "a victory for the girls." In 2011, the Niagara Regional Council considered instituting a law requiring strippers in the Regional Municipality of Niagara to submit fingerprints so that the Niagara Regional Police Service could keep better track of the strippers and make sure that they were not minors, and Lambrinos called the proposed law "absolutely outrageous, discriminatory and insulting." Also that year, Lambrinos complained that U.S. Customs and Border Protection was giving a hard time to strippers crossing the Canada–United States border, but Canadian officials responded that Canada had been keeping the strippers' profession confidential, and had not been sharing this information with the United States. In 2012, he issued a complaint to the Toronto City Council regarding sex clubs in the city, saying that "there's no laws that governs these clubs or the swingers inside."
