= Adult Entertainment Association of Canada =

- Type: NGO
- Legal status: Coalition
- Purpose: To promote the interests of 53 strip clubs
- Location: Canada
- Region served: Ontario
- Members: Strip club owners and agents
- Official language: English
- Director: Tim Lambrinos
- Website: www.adultentertainmentassociation.ca

The Adult Entertainment Association of Canada (AEAC; also called the Adult Association of Canada) is a coalition of strip club owners and their agents that represents 53 of the 140 strip clubs in Ontario, Canada. Tim Lambrinos is the organization's director.

== History ==
The Exotic Dancers' Alliance (EDA), a collective that was founded in 1995 to bring together both former and current strippers and their supporters, sought to establish minimum employment standards for strippers in Ontario by contending with the AEAC, but the EDA ceased to exist in 2004. Also in 2004, Ottawa instituted a law against lap dancing, and the AEAC unsuccessfully attempted to have the law overturned in 2007. Starting in 2004, the AEAC and the Department of Citizenship and Immigration Canada became embroiled in a long-standing controversy about work permits for foreign workers to be hired for the purpose of striptease.

In 2008, when Minister of Citizenship and Immigration Diane Finley allegedly received threats from sex industry officials in relation to her support of Bill C-17, which sought to allow immigration officers to deny temporary visas to prospective strippers if they were suspected to be sex trafficking victims, Lambrinos said that "it's not plausible" that any of the AEAC strip clubs were responsible for the threats. In 2009, the AEAC invited Toronto City Council members to attend a free lunch at a strip club in the city, and three councillors accepted the invitation.

The AEAC released a statement in 2010 that the government's crackdown on sex industry worker visas had resulted in a stripper shortage, and Minister of Public Safety Vic Toews responded by saying that the strip clubs that were short on strippers because of the crackdown were engaging in human trafficking. Toews then ordered the Royal Canadian Mounted Police to investigate the relevant strip clubs in order to determine whether or not the strippers working there were illegal immigrants or sex trafficking victims, and the AEAC launched a campaign to deny these allegations.
