= Haldimand—Norfolk—Brant =

Former federal electoral district in Ontario, Canada

Ontario electoral district

Defunct federal electoral district
- Legislature: House of Commons
- District created: 1996
- District abolished: 2003
- First contested: 1997
- Last contested: 2000

Haldimand—Norfolk—Brant was a federal electoral district in Ontario, Canada, that was represented in the House of Commons of Canada from 1997 to 2004. This riding was created in 1996 from parts of Elgin—Norfolk and Haldimand—Norfolk ridings.

It consisted of the Regional Municipality of Haldimand-Norfolk (excluding the Town of Dunnville), the townships of Burford, Oakland and Onondaga in the County of Brant, the Six Nations Indian reserve No. 40 and the New Credit Indian Reserve No. 40A.

The electoral district was abolished in 2003 when it was redistributed between Brant, Haldimand—Norfolk and Oxford ridings.

== Members of Parliament ==
The riding has elected the following members of Parliament:

Parliament	Years	Member	Party
Haldimand—Norfolk—Brant; Riding created from Haldimand—Norfolk and Elgin—Norfolk
36th	1997–2000	Bob Speller	Liberal
37th	2000–2004	Bob Speller	Liberal
Riding dissolved into Haldimand—Norfolk, Brant and Oxford

== Election results ==
1997 Canadian federal election
Party	Candidate	Votes	%	±%
Liberal	Bob Speller	21,043	45.5	-8.1
Reform	Ken Gilpen	12,548	27.1	+3.6
Progressive Conservative	Sharon Hazen	9,704	21.0	+4.8
New Democratic	Herman Plas	2,516	5.4	+1.7
Green	John W. Jaques	437	0.9	+0.9
Total		46,248		
Change is from the 1993 election in Haldimand—Norfolk, which can be found on that page.

2000 Canadian federal election
Party	Candidate	Votes	%	±%
Liberal	Bob Speller	20,867	46.8	+1.3
Alliance	Jim Maki	15,416	34.6	+7.5
Progressive Conservative	Gary Muntz	5,761	12.9	-8.1
New Democratic	Norm Walpole	2,124	4.8	-0.6
Canadian Action	L. Scott Morgan	397	0.9	+0.9
Total		44,565		
Canadian Alliance change is from Reform.

== See also ==
- List of Canadian electoral districts
- Historical federal electoral districts of Canada
