= David Wells (politician) =

Canadian politician (born 1962)

The Honourable David Wells

Canadian Senator from Newfoundland and Labrador
- Incumbent
- Assumed office January 25, 2013
- Nominated by: Stephen Harper
- Appointed by: David Johnston
- Preceded by: Ethel Cochrane

Personal details
- Born: David Mark Wells; February 28, 1962 (age 64)
- Party: Conservative

David Mark Wells, ICD.D (born February 28, 1962) is a Canadian senator from Newfoundland and Labrador. He was appointed to the Senate on January 25, 2013 by Governor General David Johnston on the advice of Canada's 22nd prime minister, Stephen Harper. He is the former Chair of the Subcommittee on the Senate Estimates and the Senate's Standing Committee on Audit and Oversight. Senator Wells is a strong proponent of accountability and transparency in the Senate.

Prior to his appointment to the Upper Chamber, Senator Wells served as Deputy CEO and board member of the Canada–Newfoundland and Labrador Offshore Petroleum Board (CNLOPB) and was a member of the board's finance committee. Wells is involved in regional and national community work, with a special focus on the civic engagement of youth.

Senator Wells is a member of the Institute of Corporate Directors.

== Career ==
During his time as deputy CEO and board member of the CNLOPB, Wells worked on issues related to health and safety, resource management, the environment, and industrial benefits. As a leader in the Canadian oil and gas industry, he served as a member of the International Regulators’ Forum on Global Offshore Safety, spearheaded health and safety improvements in the industry, and worked to improve environmental practices and procedures relating to oil spill mitigation and response, alongside federal agencies and departments. He has brought his expertise from this role to the Senate and is an active promoter of responsible resource development. Wells also led the response to the Auditor General of Canada's audit of the CNLOPB in 2012.

Prior to serving at the CNLOPB, Wells held senior roles in the Canadian government, including chief of staff and senior policy advisor to the Minister of Fisheries and Oceans and director of regional affairs for Newfoundland and Labrador. Bringing these experiences to the Senate, Senator Wells advocates for positive change on issues affecting Newfoundland and Labrador and Canada.

== Community involvement and accomplishments ==
Community service work, especially relating to youth engagement and outreach, is a significant part of Wells’ life – he has stated that “being a senator is just an extension of that desire for community service, but on a national scale.” Wells has volunteered with Big Brothers Big Sisters of Canada and continues to be an ardent supporter of, and advocate for, the organization. He has also volunteered with the local Newfoundland and Labrador minor hockey association and has served on his neighbourhood School Council.

As part of his efforts relating to the civic engagement of youth, Senator Wells frequently works with the SENgage program on youth outreach events. In January 2020, he participated in the first-ever Model Senate which included students debating legislation, learning parliamentary procedures, and investigating important issues in Canada. Senator Wells has also presented at the St. John's Regional Youth Parliament and university political campus clubs.

Wells has also partnered with the Canadian Bureau for International Education (CBIE) for work in the field of Fishery Economics and Resource Management.

Wells is an accomplished high-altitude alpine mountaineer and has climbed in the Himalayas, Andes and Russia's Caucasus mountain ranges. He has summited the highest peaks in Africa, South America and Europe. In the mid-1990s, he began high-altitude climbing with a climb in the Peruvian Andes. In 2011, he summited Tanzania's Mount Kilimanjaro - which at 5,896m, is the highest peak in Africa - taking the Machame Route and climbing alpine style; he completed the climb in 7 days. In 2012, again climbing alpine style, Wells summited Europe's highest peak, Russia's 5,642m Mount Elbrus. In 2014, climbing expedition style over 15 days, he summited Argentina's Aconcagua, which, at 6,960m, is the highest mountain in the Western Hemisphere and the highest peak outside the Himalayas. In a training climb the week prior to his successful summit of Aconcagua, Wells summited Argentina's 6,759m Mount Bonete.

Wells is a former rugby player and was scrum half for the Swilers Rugby Club in their numerous championships within the Newfoundland Rugby Union. He was a member of the Newfoundland and Labrador provincial team at the Canada Summer Games during his playing years.

== Senate of Canada ==
Senator David Wells was nominated to the Senate of Canada by Prime Minister Stephen Harper and was officially appointed on January 25, 2013.

Senator Wells endorsed Peter Mackay in the 2020 Conservative Party of Canada leadership election. He co-chaired the Pierre Poilievre campaign in the 2022 Conservative Party of Canada leadership election for Atlantic Canada.

=== Committee leadership ===
Since his appointment, Wells has served on numerous Senate committees, with a special focus on topics related to Senate administration, finance, audit, and responsible resource development. He is the past Chair of the Standing Committee on Audit and Oversight and the Subcommittee on the Senate Estimates. In this capacity, he led the Senate's first-ever zero-based budgeting process. He has served on the steering committee of the Standing Committee on Internal Economy, Budgets and Administration. Wells has also served as Deputy Chair of the Subcommittee on Veterans Affairs, Chaired at the time by former General and Senator, the Honourable Romeo Dallaire.

=== Prominent bill involvement ===
In 2014, Wells was the Senate sponsor of Bill C-5, An Act to amend the Canada-Newfoundland Atlantic Accord Implementation Act, the Canada-Nova Scotia Offshore Petroleum Resources Accord Implementation Act and other Acts and to provide for certain other measures - known as the Offshore Health and Safety Act. The Act centered on offshore safety; it passed unanimously in the Senate and received Royal Assent in June 2014. During the bill's Second Reading in the Senate Chamber on May 15, 2014, Senator Wells stated, “Bill C-5 gives the offshore industry a clear occupational health and safety framework that is enforceable by law and free of jurisdictional uncertainty. It creates a modern safety regime tailored to the unique circumstances of the offshore industry. It clarifies accountability by establishing clear roles and responsibilities for all parties involved, and it provides modern enforcement powers to new occupational and safety officers and to existing operational safety officers.”

In 2018, Senator Wells voiced his opposition to Bill C-48, the Oil Tanker Moratorium Act. He spoke in the Senate Chamber on November 28, 2018 during the Second Reading debate regarding the bill, arguing that it is “unnecessary and harmful” to Canada's economy and that there are better ways “to achieve the objectives of environmental protection and responsible resource development.”

=== Bill C-218 ===
In 2021, Wells sponsored Bill C-218, An Act to amend the Criminal Code (sports betting), in the Senate. The bill was passed on June 22, 2021, thereby allowing single-event sports betting to be legally offered in Canada.

During his Second Reading speech, Wells stated that despite single-event sports betting not being legal in Canada prior to the bill's passage, “Canadians [were] spending about $14 billion annually on this very product,” and that “the passage of this bill would allow for provincial governments to finally start regulating single-event sports betting.” He added during his Third Reading speech that “this legislation strengthens consumer protections and has safeguards that provide support for problem gambling and addictions” and “unlocks hundreds of millions of dollars in taxes and revenues annually that can be reinvested into critical programs and communities.”

The bill received support from the NHL, MLB, NBA, MLS, CFL, the Canadian Olympic Committee, the Responsible Gambling Council, the Canadian Chamber of Commerce, and the Canadian Centre for Ethics in Sport – along with other stakeholders. It passed in the Senate without amendment, receiving a final vote of 57-20.

=== Canada-Europe relations ===
Throughout his career in the Senate, Wells has made diplomatic contributions to Canada-Europe relations. In October 2016, Wells spoke at the Parliamentary Assembly of the Council of Europe regarding establishing standards for unaccompanied refugee minors, and also met with Marie-Anne Coninsx, former EU Ambassador to Canada, to discuss CETA, Brexit, and other issues of international relations. In October 2017, Wells spoke at the Organization for Economic Co-operation and Development (OECD) in Paris about immigration systems and practices in Canada. Wells serves on the Executive Committee of the Canada-Europe Parliamentary Association and, in October 2018, represented Canada as the Head of Delegation at the European Parliament, where Canada has official observer status. In June 2019, Wells spoke at the Parliamentary Assembly of the Council of Europe in Strasbourg, France regarding equality and human rights.

=== Senate Sesquicentennial Medal ===
In 2017, the 150th anniversary of Canada and the Canadian Senate, Wells, along with fellow Senator, the Hon. Serge Joyal, P.C., conceived of and co-chaired an Advisory Working Group of the development of the Senate Sesquicentennial Medal. Unlike many medals and awards which reward well-known achievements, the Senate 150 Medal commemorated and celebrated Canadians, “who, through generosity, dedication, volunteerism and hard work, make their hometowns, communities, regions, provinces or territories a better place to live.”

The medal was designed by Lt.-Col. Carl Gauthier, Director of Honours & Recognition at the Department of National Defence and was struck by the Royal Canadian Mint. More than 2,500 medals have been awarded to deserving Canadians from all provinces and territories and from all walks of life.

=== Committees and subcommittees ===
Wells has served on the following standing committees and subcommittees of the Senate.

- Committee on Audit and Oversight (former Chair)
- Committee on Human Rights
- Committee on Rules, Procedures and the Rights of Parliament
- Committee on Energy, the Environment and Natural Resources
- Committee on Internal Economy, Budgets and Administration (steering committee)
- Committee on Foreign Affairs and International Trade
- Committee on Fisheries and Oceans
- Committee on National Finance
- Committee on National Security and Defence
- Committee on Banking, Trade and Commerce
- Subcommittee on Veterans Affairs (former Deputy Chair)
- Subcommittee on the Senate Estimates (former Chair)
- Subcommittee on Communications
- Working Group on Corporate Credit Card (former Chair)

Senator Wells has also served as Acting Leader, Acting Deputy Leader, Acting Whip, Deputy Whip and Caucus Chair for the Conservative Party in the Senate.

=== Parliamentary associations and inter-Parliamentary groups ===
Throughout his time on the Senate, Wells has been actively involved in numerous Parliamentary associations and inter-Parliamentary groups, including the following.

- Canada-United States Inter-Parliamentary Group (former Vice-Chair)
- Canadian Section of ParlAmericas
- Canada-Europe Parliamentary Association (Executive)
- Canada-United Kingdom Inter-Parliamentary Association
- Canada-China Legislative Association
- Canada-Japan Inter-Parliamentary Group
- Canadian NATO Parliamentary Association
- Canadian Branch of the Commonwealth Parliamentary Association
- Canadian Group of the Inter-Parliamentary Union
- International Monetary Fund Parliamentary Association
- World Bank Parliamentary Association
- Canada-UAE Parliamentary Friendship Group (Executive)
- Canada-Slovakia Parliamentary Friendship Group (Executive)
- Canada-Bulgaria Parliamentary Friendship Group (Executive)

== Audit and Oversight Committee ==
In 2014, Canada's Auditor General (AG) was invited to audit Senate expenditure, including expenses of individual Senators, in the wake of the Senate scandal. In his 2015 report, the AG recommended an independent body be established to have oversight of Senators’ expenses. The AG chose to review Senators’ office, travel, and hospitality expenditures, which at the time represented approximately 10% of the Senate's total budget.

In the wake of the Auditor General's report, the Senate Standing Committee on Internal Economy, Budgets and Administration tasked the Subcommittee on the Senate Estimates, of which Wells was Chair, to address the recommendation. The Subcommittee on the Senate Estimates submitted its unanimous report recommending a new Senate committee of five Senators with an internal auditor and external auditor advising the new Committee. The recommendation from the Estimates Subcommittee went further than the recommendation of the AG in his report. It was recommended to have oversight of the entire Senate expenditure and not just Senators' travel and office spending.

In October 2020, Wells moved a motion in the Senate to create a Standing Committee on Audit and Oversight with a membership of three Senators and two external members tasked with oversight of all Senate expenditures as well as overseeing the work of the existing external auditor and the newly created position of internal auditor. The motion passed unanimously. It is unique to the Senate to have a committee with external membership. While the external members do not have voting rights, any member has the right to include a dissenting opinion in any of the committee's reports. This was an innovation designed to provide public confidence in the overall expenditure of the Senate and ensure oversight of the Senate's specific expenditures, the efficiency of its procedures, and the compliance of its activities with all Senate rules.

Wells spearheaded the effort to establish the Audit and Oversight Committee through his committee work, speeches in the Senate, published articles, and as a subject matter witness at numerous committees studying the issue. He was elected as the Committee's first ever Chair on November 25, 2020.
