= Yonah Martin =

Canadian politician (born 1965)

The Honourable Yonah Martin
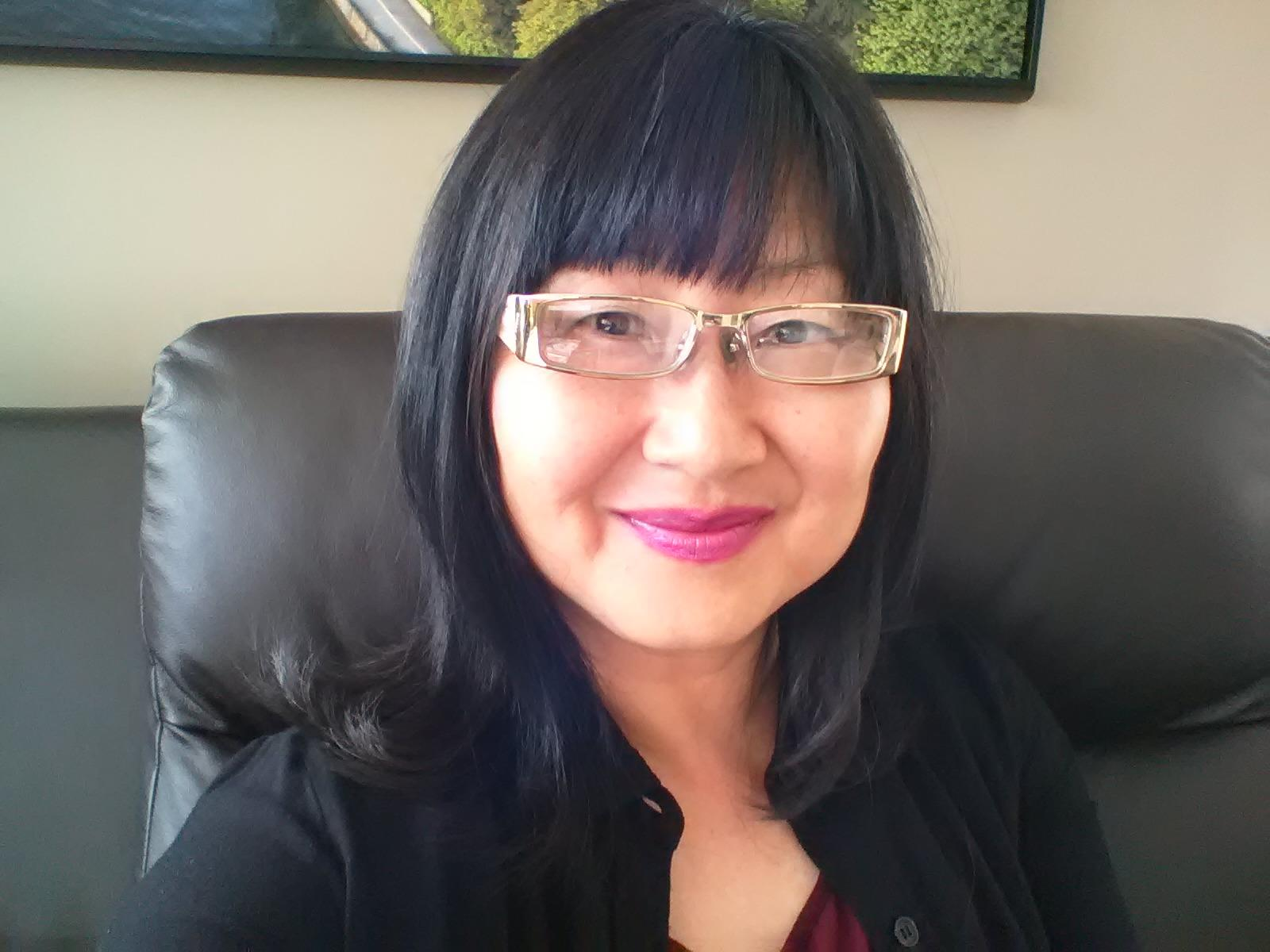

Deputy Leader of the Opposition
- Incumbent
- Assumed office November 4, 2015
- Leader: Don Plett
- Preceded by: Position established

Canadian Senator from British Columbia
- Incumbent
- Assumed office January 2, 2009
- Nominated by: Stephen Harper
- Appointed by: Michaëlle Jean

Personal details
- Born: Yonah Kim; April 11, 1965 (age 61) Seoul, South Korea
- Party: Conservative
- Education: University of British Columbia (BEd, MEd)

Yonah Martin (née Kim; born April 11, 1965) is a Canadian politician. On the recommendation of Prime Minister Stephen Harper, Martin was appointed to the Senate of Canada by Governor General Michaëlle Jean on November 4, 2009. A member of the Conservative Party, Martin is the first person of Korean descent to serve in the Senate of Canada. She is also the first Korean Parliamentarian in Canadian history.

She is currently the Deputy Leader of the Opposition in the Senate in the Senate. She served as Deputy Whip of the Government in the Senate, from May 2011 to August 2013; and has been Co-Chair of the Canada Korea Inter-Parliamentary Friendship Group since 2009.

== Career ==
Born in Seoul, South Korea, Martin immigrated to Canada with her family in 1972, settling in Vancouver. With roots in both Korean and Canadian heritage, she became a community activist and voice of authority for Canadians of Korean descent. Inspired by her Canadian-born daughter and immigrant parents, and with a desire to "bridge communities", she co-founded C3 Society in 2003.

Martin graduated from the University of British Columbia in 1987, and earned a Master of Education in 1996. She spent 21 years as an educator in Abbotsford, Burnaby and Coquitlam school districts until her appointment to the Senate.

On June 19, 2013, her Bill S-213 (Korean War Veterans Day Act), which enacts July 27 as a day of remembrance for Veterans of the Korean War, received Royal Assent.

Martin called for the resignation of her senatorial colleagues Patrick Brazeau, Pamela Wallin and Mike Duffy following the Canadian Senate Expense Scandal. The text of Martin's motion would have allowed the impugned senators to keep their Senate life, health and dental insurance.

Martin has received the Spirit of Community award for Cultural Harmony (2004), the Order of Korea Moran Medal from the Government of the Republic of Korea (2009) and the Queen's Diamond Jubilee Medal (2012).

== Personal life ==
She has been married to Doug Martin since 1990, and they have a daughter.

== Electoral record ==
Yonah Martin stood for election to the House of Commons of Canada as a candidate in the riding of New Westminster—Coquitlam.

2008 Canadian federal election: New Westminster—Coquitlam
| Party | Candidate | Votes | % | ±% | Expenditures |
|---|---|---|---|---|---|
| New Democratic | Dawn Black | 20,787 | 41.83 | +3.51 | $70,900.55 |
| Conservative | Yonah Martin | 19,299 | 38.84 | +6.30 | $93,551.75 |
| Liberal | Michelle Hassen | 5,615 | 11.30 | –12.23 | $18,056.85 |
| Green | Marshall Smith | 3,574 | 7.19 | +4.24 | $12,668.89 |
| Libertarian | Lewis C. Dahlby | 314 | 0.63 | – | none listed |
| Marxist–Leninist | Roland Verrier | 103 | 0.21 | +0.10 | none listed |
| Total valid votes/expense limit | | 49,692 | 99.67 | – | $85,621.43 |
| Total rejected ballots | | 165 | 0.33 | –0.01 | |
| Turnout | | 49,857 | 61.74 | –3.55 | |
| Eligible voters | | 80,755 | | | |
| New Democratic hold | | Swing | | –1.39 | |
Source: Elections Canada
