= 24th Canadian Ministry =

Government cabinet of Canada (1984–1993)

24th Canadian Ministry 24e conseil des ministres du Canada
- 24th ministry of Canada

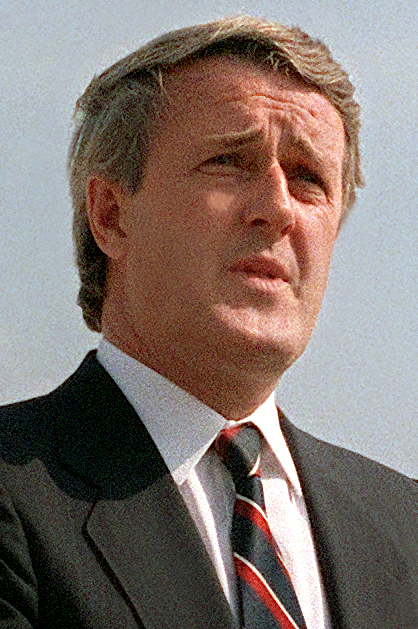
- Date formed: 17 September 1984
- Date dissolved: 25 June 1993

People and organizations
- Monarch: Elizabeth II
- Governor General: Jeanne Sauvé (1984–1990); Ray Hnatyshyn (1990–1993)
- Prime Minister: Brian Mulroney
- Deputy Prime Minister: Erik Nielsen (1984–1986); Don Mazankowski (1986–1993)
- Member party: Progressive Conservative
- Status in legislature: Majority
- Opposition party: Liberal
- Opposition leader: John Turner (1984–1990); Herb Gray (1990); Jean Chrétien (1990–1993)

History
- Elections: 1984, 1988
- Legislature terms: 33rd Canadian Parliament; 34th Canadian Parliament
- Budgets: 1985, 1986, 1987, 1988, 1989, 1990, 1991, 1992, 1993
- Incoming formation: 1984 federal election
- Outgoing formation: 1993 PC leadership election
- Predecessor: 23rd Canadian Ministry
- Successor: 25th Canadian Ministry

The Twenty-Fourth Canadian Ministry was the cabinet chaired by Prime Minister Brian Mulroney. It governed Canada from 17 September 1984 to 25 June 1993, including the 33rd Canadian Parliament and most of the 34th. The government was formed by the Progressive Conservative Party of Canada.

== Ministers ==
Portfolio	Minister	Term	
Portfolio	Minister	Start	End
Prime Minister	Brian Mulroney	17 September 1984	25 June 1993
Deputy Prime Minister	Erik Nielsen	17 September 1984	30 June 1986
Deputy Prime Minister	Don Mazankowski	30 June 1986	25 June 1993
Minister of Agriculture	John Wise	17 September 1984	15 September 1988
Minister of Agriculture	Don Mazankowski	15 September 1988	21 April 1991
Minister of Agriculture	Bill McKnight	21 April 1991	4 January 1993
Minister of Agriculture	Charles Mayer	4 January 1993	25 June 1993
Minister of State (Agriculture)(Canadian Wheat Board)	Charles Mayer	17 September 1984	27 August 1987
Minister of State (Agriculture)(Canadian Wheat Board)	Pierre Blais	27 August 1987	25 June 1993
Minister for the Atlantic Canada Opportunities Agency	Lowell Murray	6 June 1987	15 September 1988
Minister for the Atlantic Canada Opportunities Agency	Gerald Merrithew	15 September 1988	30 January 1989
Minister for the Atlantic Canada Opportunities Agency	Elmer MacKay	30 January 1989	21 April 1991
Minister for the Atlantic Canada Opportunities Agency	John Crosbie	21 April 1991	25 June 1993
Minister responsible for the Canadian Dairy Commission	John Wise	17 September 1984	15 September 1988
Minister responsible for the Canadian Dairy Commission	Don Mazankowski	15 September 1988	21 April 1991
Minister responsible for the Canadian Dairy Commission	Bill McKnight	21 April 1991	4 January 1993
Minister responsible for the Canadian Dairy Commission	Charles Mayer	4 January 1993	25 June 1993
Minister responsible for Canadian International Development Agency	Monique Vézina	17 September 1984	30 June 1986
Minister responsible for Canadian International Development Agency	Monique Landry	30 June 1986	4 January 1993
Minister responsible for Canadian International Development Agency	Monique Vézina	4 January 1993	25 June 1993
Minister responsible for Canada Mortgage and Housing Corporation	Bill McKnight	17 September 1984	30 June 1986
Minister responsible for Canada Mortgage and Housing Corporation	Stewart McInnes	30 June 1986	15 September 1988
Minister responsible for Canada Mortgage and Housing Corporation	John McDermid	15 September 1988	30 January 1989
Minister responsible for Canada Mortgage and Housing Corporation	Alan Redway	30 January 1989	15 March 1991
Minister responsible for Canada Mortgage and Housing Corporation	John McDermid (acting)	15 March 1991	21 April 1991
Minister responsible for Canada Mortgage and Housing Corporation	Elmer MacKay	21 April 1991	25 June 1993
Minister responsible for Canada Post Corporation	Perrin Beatty	17 September 1984	20 August 1985
Minister responsible for Canada Post Corporation	Michel Côté	20 August 1985	20 January 1987
Minister responsible for Canada Post Corporation	Harvie Andre (acting)	20 January 1987	10 February 1987
Minister responsible for Canada Post Corporation	Harvie Andre	10 February 1987	25 June 1993
Minister responsible for the Canadian Wheat Board	John Wise	17 September 1984	15 September 1988
Minister responsible for the Canadian Wheat Board	Charles Mayer	15 September 1988	25 June 1993
Minister of State (Canadian Wheat Board)	Charles Mayer	17 September 1984	25 June 1993
Minister of Communications	Marcel Masse	17 September 1984	26 September 1985
Minister of Communications	Benoît Bouchard (acting)	26 September 1985	30 November 1985
Minister of Communications	Marcel Masse	30 November 1985	30 June 1986
Minister of Communications	Flora MacDonald	30 June 1986	7 December 1988
Minister of Communications	Lowell Murray (acting)	7 December 1988	30 January 1989
Minister of Communications	Marcel Masse	30 January 1989	21 April 1991
Minister of Communications	Perrin Beatty	21 April 1991	25 June 1993
Minister responsible for Constitutional Affairs	Joe Clark	21 April 1991	25 June 1993
Minister of Consumer and Corporate Affairs and Registrar General	Michel Côté	17 September 1984	30 June 1986
Minister of Consumer and Corporate Affairs and Registrar General	Harvie Andre	30 June 1986	30 January 1989
Minister of Consumer and Corporate Affairs and Registrar General	Bernard Valcourt	30 January 1989	2 August 1989
Minister of Consumer and Corporate Affairs and Registrar General	Harvie Andre (acting)	2 August 1989	23 February 1990
Minister of Consumer and Corporate Affairs and Registrar General	Pierre Blais	23 February 1990	4 January 1993
Minister of Consumer and Corporate Affairs and Registrar General	Pierre H. Vincent	4 January 1993	25 June 1993
Minister responsible for Defence Construction Canada	Robert Coates	17 September 1984	12 February 1985
Minister responsible for Defence Construction Canada	Erik Nielsen (acting)	12 February 1985	27 February 1985
Minister responsible for Defence Construction Canada	Erik Nielsen	27 February 1985	30 June 1986
Minister responsible for Defence Construction Canada	Stewart McInnes	30 June 1986	8 December 1988
Minister responsible for Defence Construction Canada	Otto Jelinek (acting)	8 December 1988	30 January 1989
Minister responsible for Defence Construction Canada	Elmer MacKay	30 January 1989	23 February 1990
Minister responsible for Defence Construction Canada	Paul Dick	23 February 1990	25 June 1993
Minister of Employment and Immigration	Flora MacDonald	17 September 1984	30 June 1986
Minister of Employment and Immigration	Benoît Bouchard	30 June 1986	31 March 1988
Minister of Employment and Immigration	Barbara McDougall	31 March 1988	21 April 1991
Minister of Employment and Immigration	Bernard Valcourt	21 April 1991	25 June 1993
Minister of State (Employment and Immigration)	Monique Vézina	31 March 1988	4 January 1993
Minister of State (Employment and Immigration)	Pauline Browes	4 January 1993	25 June 1993
Minister of Energy, Mines, and Resources	Pat Carney	17 September 1984	30 June 1986
Minister of Energy, Mines, and Resources	Marcel Masse	30 June 1986	30 January 1989
Minister of Energy, Mines, and Resources	Jake Epp	30 January 1989	4 January 1993
Minister of Energy, Mines, and Resources	Bill McKnight	4 January 1993	25 June 1993
Minister of the Environment	Suzanne Blais-Grenier	17 September 1984	20 August 1985
Minister of the Environment	Thomas McMillan	20 August 1985	8 December 1988
Minister of the Environment	Lucien Bouchard (acting)	8 December 1988	30 January 1989
Minister of the Environment	Lucien Bouchard	30 January 1989	22 May 1990
Minister of the Environment	Frank Oberle (acting)	22 May 1990	23 May 1990
Minister of the Environment	Robert de Cotret (acting)	23 May 1990	20 September 1990
Minister of the Environment	Robert de Cotret	20 September 1990	21 April 1991
Minister of the Environment	Jean Charest	21 April 1991	25 June 1993
Minister of State (Environment)	Pauline Browes	21 April 1991	4 January 1993
Minister of State (Environment)	Mary Collins	4 January 1993	25 June 1993
Secretary of State for External Affairs	Joe Clark	17 September 1984	21 April 1991
Secretary of State for External Affairs	Barbara McDougall	21 April 1991	25 June 1993
Minister of State for External Relations	Monique Vézina	17 September 1984	30 June 1986
Minister of State for External Relations	Monique Landry	30 June 1986	4 January 1993
Minister of State for External Relations	Monique Vézina	4 January 1993	25 June 1993
Minister of State (Federal-Provincial Relations)	Lowell Murray	30 June 1986	21 April 1991
Minister of Finance	Michael Wilson	17 September 1984	21 April 1991
Minister of Finance	Don Mazankowski	21 April 1991	25 June 1993
Minister of State (Finance)	Barbara McDougall	17 September 1984	30 June 1986
Minister of State (Finance)	Tom Hockin	30 June 1986	30 January 1989
Minister of State (Finance)	Gilles Loiselle	30 January 1989	25 June 1993
Minister of State (Finance and Privatization)	John McDermid	26 February 1991	25 June 1993
Minister of Fisheries and Oceans	John Allen Fraser	17 September 1984	24 September 1985
Minister of Fisheries and Oceans	Erik Nielsen (acting)	24 September 1985	20 November 1985
Minister of Fisheries and Oceans	Tom Siddon	20 November 1985	23 February 1990
Minister of Fisheries and Oceans	Bernard Valcourt	23 February 1990	21 April 1991
Minister of Fisheries and Oceans	John Crosbie	21 April 1991	25 June 1993
Minister of State (Fitness and Amateur Sport)	Otto Jelinek	17 September 1984	31 March 1988
Minister of State (Fitness and Amateur Sport)	Jean Charest	31 March 1988	24 January 1990
Minister of State (Fitness and Amateur Sport)	Perrin Beatty (acting)	24 January 1990	23 February 1990
Minister of State (Fitness and Amateur Sport)	Marcel Danis	23 February 1990	21 April 1991
Minister of State (Fitness and Amateur Sport)	Pierre Cadieux	21 April 1991	25 June 1993
Minister of Forestry	Frank Oberle	23 February 1990	25 June 1993
Minister of State (Forestry)	Gerald Merrithew	30 June 1986	15 September 1988
Minister of State (Forestry)	Gerry St. Germain	15 September 1988	8 December 1988
Minister of State (Forestry)	Frank Oberle (acting)	8 December 1988	30 January 1989
Minister of State (Forestry)	Frank Oberle	30 January 1989	23 February 1990
Minister of State (Forestry and Mines)	Gerald Merrithew	17 September 1984	30 June 1986
Minister of State (Grains and Oilseeds)	Charles Mayer	17 September 1984	4 January 1993
Minister of State (Housing)	John McDermid	15 September 1988	30 January 1989
Minister of State (Housing)	Alan Redway	30 January 1989	15 March 1991
Minister of Indian Affairs and Northern Development	David Crombie	17 September 1984	30 June 1986
Minister of Indian Affairs and Northern Development	Bill McKnight	30 June 1986	30 January 1989
Minister of Indian Affairs and Northern Development	Pierre Cadieux	30 January 1989	23 February 1990
Minister of Indian Affairs and Northern Development	Tom Siddon	23 February 1990	25 June 1993
Minister of State (Indian Affairs and Northern Development)	Bernard Valcourt	27 August 1987	30 January 1989
Minister of State (Indian Affairs and Northern Development)	Kim Campbell	30 January 1989	23 February 1990
Minister of State (Indian Affairs and Northern Development)	Shirley Martin	23 February 1990	21 April 1991
Minister of State (Indian Affairs and Northern Development)	Monique Landry	21 April 1991	4 January 1993
Minister of State (Indian Affairs and Northern Development)	Pierre H. Vincent	4 January 1993	25 June 1993
Minister of State (Immigration)	Walter McLean	20 August 1985	30 June 1986
Minister of State (Immigration)	Gerry Weiner	30 June 1986	31 March 1988
Minister of Industry, Science and Technology	Benoît Bouchard	23 February 1990	21 April 1991
Minister of Industry, Science and Technology	Michael Wilson	21 April 1991	25 June 1993
Minister of International Trade	James Kelleher	17 September 1984	30 June 1986
Minister of International Trade	Pat Carney	30 June 1986	31 March 1988
Minister of International Trade	John Crosbie	31 March 1988	21 April 1991
Minister of International Trade	Michael Wilson	21 April 1991	25 June 1993
Minister of State (International Trade)	John McDermid	15 September 1988	30 January 1989
Minister of Justice and Attorney General	John Crosbie	17 September 1984	30 June 1986
Minister of Justice and Attorney General	Ray Hnatyshyn	30 June 1986	8 December 1988
Minister of Justice and Attorney General	Joe Clark (acting)	8 December 1988	30 January 1989
Minister of Justice and Attorney General	Doug Lewis	30 January 1989	23 February 1990
Minister of Justice and Attorney General	Kim Campbell	23 February 1990	4 January 1993
Minister of Justice and Attorney General	Pierre Blais	4 January 1993	25 June 1993
Minister responsible for La Francophonie	Monique Vézina	17 September 1984	30 June 1986
Minister responsible for La Francophonie	Monique Landry	30 June 1986	4 January 1993
Minister responsible for La Francophonie	Monique Vézina	4 January 1993	25 June 1993
Minister of Labour	Bill McKnight	17 September 1984	30 June 1986
Minister of Labour	Pierre Cadieux	30 June 1986	30 January 1989
Minister of Labour	Jean Corbeil	30 January 1989	21 April 1991
Minister of Labour	Marcel Danis	21 April 1991	25 June 1993
Minister of State (Leader of the Government in the House of Commons)	Ray Hnatyshyn	17 September 1984	27 February 1985
Minister of State (Leader of the Government in the House of Commons)	Harvie Andre	23 February 1990	25 June 1993
Leader of the Government in the House of Commons	Ray Hnatyshyn	17 September 1984	30 June 1986
Leader of the Government in the House of Commons	Don Mazankowski	30 June 1986	3 April 1989
Leader of the Government in the House of Commons	Doug Lewis	3 April 1989	23 February 1990
Leader of the Government in the House of Commons	Harvie Andre	23 February 1990	25 June 1993
Minister of State (Deputy Leader of the Government in the House of Commons)	Doug Lewis	27 August 1987	30 January 1989
Deputy Leader of the Government in the House of Commons	Doug Lewis	27 August 1987	30 January 1989
Deputy Leader of the Government in the House of Commons	Jean Charest	30 January 1989	23 February 1990
Deputy Leader of the Government in the House of Commons	Marcel Danis	23 February 1990	21 April 1991
Deputy Leader of the Government in the House of Commons	Pierre Cadieux	21 April 1991	25 June 1993
Leader of the Government in the Senate	Dufferin Roblin	17 September 1984	30 June 1986
Leader of the Government in the Senate	Lowell Murray	30 June 1986	25 June 1993
Minister responsible for Metric Commission	Michel Côté	17 September 1984	31 March 1985
Minister responsible for Multiculturalism	Otto Jelinek	17 September 1984	30 June 1986
Minister responsible for Multiculturalism	David Crombie	30 June 1986	31 March 1988
Minister of State	Roch La Salle	17 September 1984	20 February 1987
Minister of State (Mines)	Robert Layton	17 September 1984	30 June 1986
Minister of State (Multiculturalism)	Jack Murta	17 September 1984	20 August 1985
Minister of State (Multiculturalism)	Otto Jelinek	20 August 1985	30 June 1986
Minister of State (Multiculturalism)	David Crombie	30 June 1986	31 March 1988
Minister of State (Multiculturalism)	Gerry Weiner	31 March 1988	15 September 1988
Minister of State (Multiculturalism and Citizenship)	Gerry Weiner	15 September 1988	21 April 1991
Minister of Multiculturalism and Citizenship	Gerry Weiner	21 April 1991	25 June 1993
Minister responsible for National Capital Commission	Roch La Salle	17 September 1984	30 June 1986
Minister responsible for National Capital Commission	Stewart McInnes	30 June 1986	8 December 1988
Minister responsible for National Capital Commission	Otto Jelinek (acting)	8 December 1988	30 January 1989
Minister responsible for National Capital Commission	Elmer MacKay	30 January 1989	25 June 1993
Associate Minister of National Defence	Vacant	17 September 1984	20 August 1985
Associate Minister of National Defence	Harvie Andre	20 August 1985	30 June 1986
Associate Minister of National Defence	Paul Dick	30 June 1986	30 January 1989
Associate Minister of National Defence	Mary Collins	30 January 1989	4 January 1993
Associate Minister of National Defence	Vacant	4 January 1993	25 June 1993
Minister of National Defence	Robert Coates	17 September 1984	12 February 1985
Minister of National Defence	Erik Nielsen (acting)	12 February 1985	27 February 1985
Minister of National Defence	Erik Nielsen	27 February 1985	30 June 1986
Minister of National Defence	Perrin Beatty	30 June 1986	30 January 1989
Minister of National Defence	Bill McKnight	30 January 1989	21 April 1991
Minister of National Defence	Marcel Masse	21 April 1991	4 January 1993
Minister of National Defence	Kim Campbell	4 January 1993	25 June 1993
Minister of National Health and Welfare	Jake Epp	17 September 1984	30 January 1989
Minister of National Health and Welfare	Perrin Beatty	30 January 1989	21 April 1991
Minister of National Health and Welfare	Benoît Bouchard	21 April 1991	25 June 1993
Minister of National Revenue	Perrin Beatty	17 September 1984	20 August 1985
Minister of National Revenue	Elmer MacKay	20 August 1985	30 January 1989
Minister of National Revenue	Otto Jelinek	30 January 1989	25 June 1993
President of the Privy Council	Erik Nielsen	17 September 1984	27 February 1985
President of the Privy Council	Ray Hnatyshyn	27 February 1985	30 June 1986
President of the Privy Council	Don Mazankowski	30 June 1986	21 April 1991
President of the Privy Council	Joe Clark	21 April 1991	25 June 1993
Minister responsible for Privatization and Regulatory Affairs	Don Mazankowski	27 August 1987	21 April 1991
Minister of State (Privatization and Regulatory Affairs)	Barbara McDougall	30 June 1986	31 March 1988
Minister of State (Privatization and Regulatory Affairs)	Don Mazankowski	31 March 1988	30 January 1989
Minister of State (Privatization and Regulatory Affairs)	John McDermid	30 January 1989	26 February 1991
Minister of Public Works	Roch La Salle	17 September 1984	30 June 1986
Minister of Public Works	Stewart McInnes	30 June 1986	8 December 1988
Minister of Public Works	Otto Jelinek (acting)	8 December 1988	30 January 1989
Minister of Public Works	Elmer MacKay	30 January 1989	25 June 1993
Minister of Regional Economic Expansion	Sinclair Stevens	17 September 1984	13 May 1986
Minister of Regional Economic Expansion	Don Mazankowski (acting)	13 May 1986	30 June 1986
Minister of Regional Economic Expansion	Michel Côté	30 June 1986	27 August 1987
Minister of Regional Economic Expansion	Robert de Cotret	27 August 1987	30 January 1989
Minister of Regional Economic Expansion	Harvie Andre	30 January 1989	23 February 1990
Minister responsible for Royal Canadian Mint	Harvie Andre	17 September 1984	20 August 1985
Minister responsible for Royal Canadian Mint	Stewart McInnes	20 August 1985	30 June 1986
Minister responsible for Royal Canadian Mint	Monique Vézina	30 June 1986	27 August 1987
Minister responsible for Royal Canadian Mint	Michel Côté	27 August 1987	3 February 1988
Minister responsible for Royal Canadian Mint	Stewart McInnes (acting)	3 February 1988	31 March 1988
Minister responsible for Royal Canadian Mint	Lucien Bouchard	31 March 1988	30 January 1989
Minister responsible for Royal Canadian Mint	Paul Dick	30 January 1989	25 June 1993
Minister for Science	William Winegard	23 February 1990	4 January 1993
Minister for Science	Tom Hockin	4 January 1993	25 June 1993
Minister of State (Science and Technology)	Tom Siddon	17 September 1984	20 November 1985
Minister of State (Science and Technology)	Frank Oberle	20 November 1985	11 August 1987
Minister of State (Science and Technology)	Michel Côté	11 August 1987	27 August 1987
Minister of State (Science and Technology)	Frank Oberle	11 August 1987	30 January 1989
Minister of State (Science and Technology)	Robert de Cotret	27 August 1987	30 January 1989
Minister of State (Science and Technology)	Harvie Andre	30 January 1989	23 February 1990
Minister of State (Science and Technology)	William Winegard	30 January 1989	23 February 1990
Secretary of State for Canada	Walter McLean	17 September 1984	20 August 1985
Secretary of State for Canada	Benoît Bouchard	20 August 1985	30 June 1986
Secretary of State for Canada	David Crombie	30 June 1986	31 March 1988
Secretary of State for Canada	Lucien Bouchard	31 March 1988	30 January 1989
Secretary of State for Canada	Gerry Weiner	30 January 1989	21 April 1991
Secretary of State for Canada	Robert de Cotret	21 April 1991	4 January 1993
Secretary of State for Canada	Monique Landry	4 January 1993	25 June 1993
Minister of State (Seniors)	George Hees	27 August 1987	15 September 1988
Minister of State (Seniors)	Monique Vézina	15 September 1988	25 June 1993
Minister of State (Small Businesses)	André Bissonnette	17 September 1984	30 June 1986
Minister of State (Small Businesses and Tourism)	Bernard Valcourt	30 June 1986	30 January 1989
Minister of State (Small Businesses and Tourism)	Tom Hockin	30 January 1989	25 June 1993
Minister of State (Tourism)	Thomas McMillan	17 September 1984	20 August 1985
Minister of State (Tourism)	Jack Murta	20 August 1985	30 June 1986
Solicitor General	Elmer MacKay	17 September 1984	20 August 1985
Solicitor General	Perrin Beatty	20 August 1985	30 June 1986
Solicitor General	James Kelleher	30 June 1986	8 December 1988
Solicitor General	Perrin Beatty (acting)	8 December 1988	30 January 1989
Solicitor General	Pierre Blais	30 January 1989	23 February 1990
Solicitor General	Pierre Cadieux	23 February 1990	21 April 1991
Solicitor General	Doug Lewis	21 April 1991	25 June 1993
Minister responsible for Standards Council of Canada	Michel Côté	17 September 1984	30 June 1986
Minister responsible for Standards Council of Canada	Harvie Andre	30 June 1986	30 January 1989
Minister responsible for Standards Council of Canada	Bernard Valcourt	30 January 1989	2 August 1989
Minister responsible for Standards Council of Canada	Harvie Andre (acting)	2 August 1989	23 February 1990
Minister responsible for Standards Council of Canada	Pierre Blais	23 February 1990	4 January 1993
Minister responsible for Standards Council of Canada	Pierre H. Vincent	4 January 1993	25 June 1993
Minister responsible for the Status of Women	Walter McLean	17 September 1984	30 June 1986
Minister responsible for the Status of Women	Barbara McDougall	30 June 1986	23 February 1990
Minister responsible for the Status of Women	Mary Collins	23 February 1990	25 June 1993
Minister of Supply and Services and Receiver General	Harvie Andre	17 September 1984	20 August 1985
Minister of Supply and Services and Receiver General	Stewart McInnes	20 August 1985	30 June 1986
Minister of Supply and Services and Receiver General	Monique Vézina	30 June 1986	27 August 1987
Minister of Supply and Services and Receiver General	Michel Côté	27 August 1987	3 February 1988
Minister of Supply and Services and Receiver General	Stewart McInnes (acting)	3 February 1988	31 March 1988
Minister of Supply and Services and Receiver General	Lucien Bouchard	31 March 1988	30 January 1989
Minister of Supply and Services and Receiver General	Paul Dick	30 January 1989	25 June 1993
Minister of Transport	Don Mazankowski	17 September 1984	30 June 1986
Minister of Transport	John Crosbie	30 June 1986	31 March 1988
Minister of Transport	Benoît Bouchard	31 March 1988	23 February 1990
Minister of Transport	Doug Lewis	23 February 1990	21 April 1991
Minister of Transport	Jean Corbeil	21 April 1991	25 June 1993
Minister of State (Transport)	Benoît Bouchard	17 September 1984	20 August 1985
Minister of State (Transport)	Suzanne Blais-Grenier	20 August 1985	31 December 1985
Minister of State (Transport)	André Bissonnette	30 June 1986	19 January 1987
Minister of State (Transport)	Monique Vézina	27 August 1987	31 March 1988
Minister of State (Transport)	Gerry St. Germain	31 March 1988	15 September 1988
Minister of State (Transport)	Shirley Martin	15 September 1988	23 February 1990
Minister of State (Transport)	Jean Corbeil	23 February 1990	21 April 1991
Minister of State (Transport)	Shirley Martin	21 April 1991	25 June 1993
President of the Treasury Board	Robert de Cotret	17 September 1984	27 August 1987
President of the Treasury Board	Don Mazankowski	27 August 1987	31 March 1988
President of the Treasury Board	Pat Carney	31 March 1988	28 September 1988
President of the Treasury Board	Michael Wilson (acting)	28 September 1988	8 December 1988
President of the Treasury Board	Doug Lewis (acting)	8 December 1988	30 January 1989
President of the Treasury Board	Robert de Cotret	30 January 1989	20 September 1990
President of the Treasury Board	Gilles Loiselle	20 September 1990	25 June 1993
Minister of State (Treasury Board)	Doug Lewis	27 August 1987	30 January 1989
Minister of Veterans Affairs	George Hees	17 September 1984	15 September 1988
Minister of Veterans Affairs	Gerald Merrithew	15 September 1988	4 January 1993
Minister of Veterans Affairs	Kim Campbell	4 January 1993	25 June 1993
Minister of the Western Diversification Office	Bill McKnight	4 August 1987	28 June 1988
Minister of Western Economic Diversification	Bill McKnight	28 June 1988	30 January 1989
Minister of Western Economic Diversification	Charles Mayer	30 January 1989	4 January 1993
Minister of Western Economic Diversification	Mary Collins	4 January 1993	25 June 1993
Minister of State (Youth)	Andrée Champagne	17 September 1984	30 June 1986
Minister of State (Youth)	Jean Charest	30 June 1986	24 January 1990
Minister of State (Youth)	Barbara McDougall (acting)	24 January 1990	23 February 1990
Minister of State (Youth)(Fitness and Amateur Sport)	Marcel Danis	23 February 1990	21 April 1991
Minister of State (Youth)(Fitness and Amateur Sport)	Pierre Cadieux	21 April 1991	25 June 1993

== Succession ==
Ministries of Canada
Preceded by 23rd Canadian Ministry	24th Canadian Ministry; 1984–1993	Succeeded by 25th Canadian Ministry
