= 21st Canadian Ministry =

Government cabinet of Canada (1979–1980)

21st Canadian Ministry 21e conseil des ministres du Canada
- 21st ministry of Canada

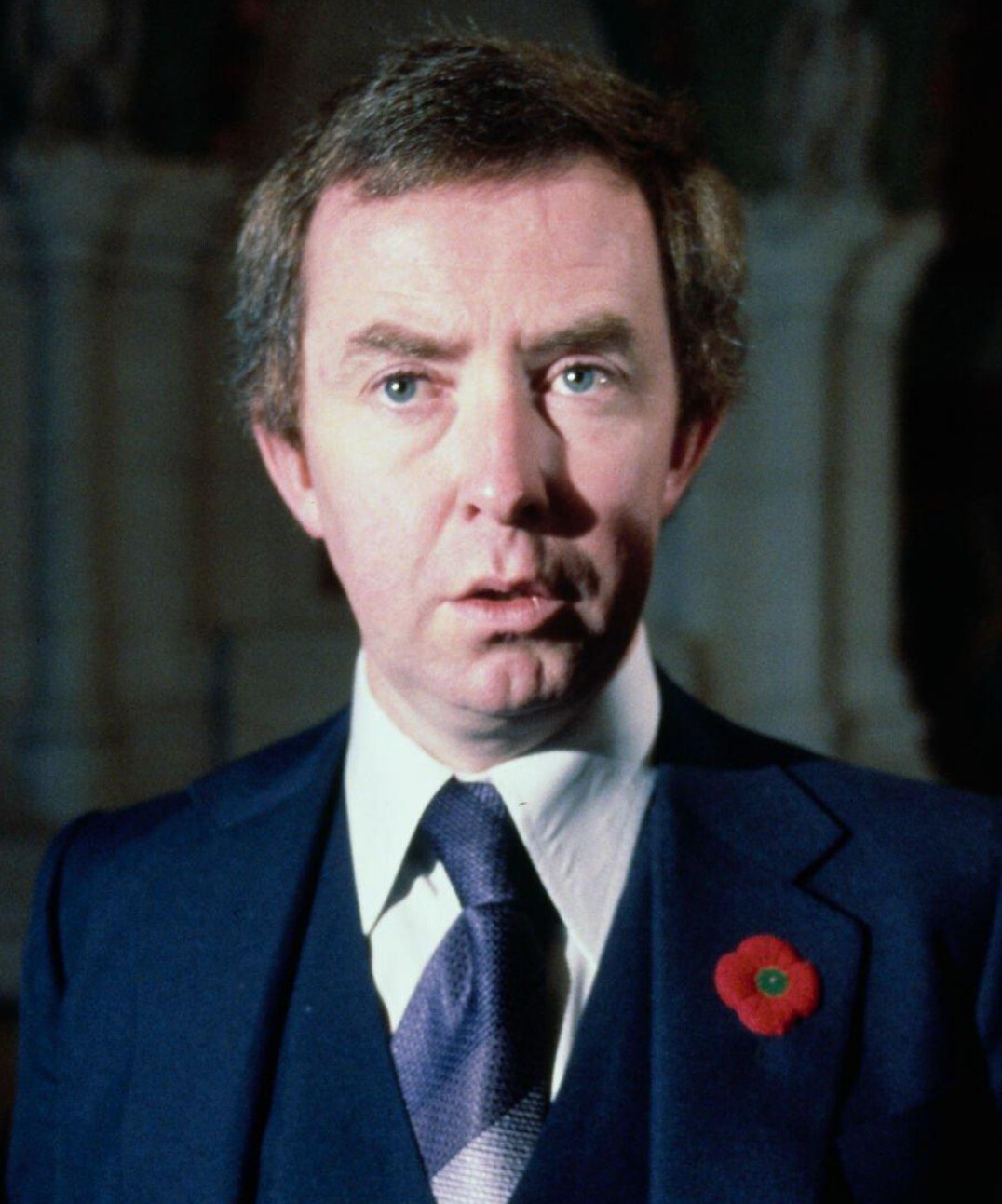
- Date formed: 4 June 1979
- Date dissolved: 3 March 1980

People and organizations
- Monarch: Elizabeth II
- Governor General: Edward Schreyer
- Prime Minister: Joe Clark
- Member party: Progressive Conservative
- Status in legislature: Minority
- Opposition party: Liberal
- Opposition leader: Pierre Trudeau

History
- Election: 1979
- Outgoing election: 1980
- Legislature term: 31st Canadian Parliament
- Budget: ~~1979~~
- Predecessor: 20th Canadian Ministry
- Successor: 22nd Canadian Ministry

The Twenty-First Canadian Ministry was the cabinet chaired by Prime Minister Joe Clark. It governed Canada from 4 June 1979 to 3 March 1980, including all of the 31st Canadian Parliament. The government was formed by the Progressive Conservative Party of Canada.

== Ministers ==
Portfolio	Minister	Term	
Portfolio	Minister	Start	End
Prime Minister	Joe Clark	4 June 1979	3 March 1980
Minister of Agriculture	John Wise	4 June 1979	3 March 1980
Minister responsible for the Canadian Dairy Commission	John Wise	4 June 1979	3 March 1980
Minister responsible for Canadian International Development Agency	Flora MacDonald	4 June 1979	3 March 1980
Minister responsible for Canada Mortgage and Housing Corporation	Elmer MacKay	4 June 1979	3 March 1980
Minister for the Canadian Wheat Board	Don Mazankowski	4 June 1979	3 March 1980
Minister of Communications	David MacDonald	4 June 1979	3 March 1980
Minister of Consumer and Corporate Affairs and Registrar General	Allan Lawrence	4 June 1979	3 March 1980
Minister responsible for Defence Construction Limited	Allan McKinnon	4 June 1979	3 March 1980
Minister of State for Economic Development	Robert de Cotret	4 June 1979	3 March 1980
Minister of Employment and Immigration	Ron Atkey	4 June 1979	3 March 1980
Minister of Energy, Mines, and Resources	Ray Hnatyshyn	4 June 1979	3 March 1980
Minister of the Environment	John Allen Fraser	4 June 1979	3 March 1980
Secretary of State for External Affairs	Flora MacDonald	4 June 1979	3 March 1980
Minister of Finance	John Crosbie	4 June 1979	3 March 1980
Minister of Fisheries and Oceans	James McGrath	4 June 1979	3 March 1980
Minister of Indian Affairs and Northern Development	Jake Epp	4 June 1979	3 March 1980
Minister of Industry, Trade, and Commerce	Robert de Cotret	4 June 1979	3 March 1980
Minister of Justice and Attorney General	Jacques Flynn	4 June 1979	3 March 1980
Minister of Labour	Lincoln Alexander	4 June 1979	3 March 1980
Leader of the Government in the House of Commons	Walter Baker	4 June 1979	3 March 1980
Leader of the Government in the Senate	Jacques Flynn	4 June 1979	3 March 1980
Minister responsible for Metric Commission	Allan Lawrence	4 June 1979	3 March 1980
Minister responsible for National Capital Commission	Erik Nielsen	4 June 1979	3 March 1980
Associate Minister of National Defence	Vacant	4 June 1979	3 March 1980
Minister of National Defence	Allan McKinnon	4 June 1979	3 March 1980
Minister of National Health and Welfare	David Crombie	4 June 1979	3 March 1980
Minister of National Revenue	Walter Baker	4 June 1979	3 March 1980
Postmaster General	John Allen Fraser	4 June 1979	3 March 1980
President of the Privy Council	Walter Baker	4 June 1979	3 March 1980
Minister of Public Works	Erik Nielsen	4 June 1979	3 March 1980
Minister of Regional Economic Expansion	Elmer MacKay	4 June 1979	3 March 1980
Minister responsible for Royal Canadian Mint	Roch La Salle	4 June 1979	3 March 1980
Minister of State for Science and Technology	Ray Hnatyshyn	4 June 1979	9 October 1979
Minister of State for Science and Technology	Heward Grafftey	9 October 1979	3 March 1980
Secretary of State for Canada	David MacDonald	4 June 1979	3 March 1980
Solicitor General	Allan Lawrence	4 June 1979	3 March 1980
Minister responsible for Standards Council of Canada	Allan Lawrence	4 June 1979	3 March 1980
Minister responsible for the Status of Women	David MacDonald	4 June 1979	3 March 1980
Minister of Supply and Services and Receiver General	Roch La Salle	4 June 1979	3 March 1980
Minister of Transport	Don Mazankowski	4 June 1979	3 March 1980
President of the Treasury Board	Sinclair Stevens	4 June 1979	3 March 1980
Minister of Veterans Affairs	Allan McKinnon	4 June 1979	3 March 1980
Minister of State	Martial Asselin (CIDA) (Francophonie)	4 June 1979	3 March 1980
Minister of State	William Jarvis (Federal-Provincial Relations)	4 June 1979	3 March 1980
Minister of State	Heward Grafftey (Social Programmes)	4 June 1979	9 October 1979
Minister of State	Perrin Beatty (Treasury Board)	4 June 1979	3 March 1980
Minister of State	Robert Howie (Transport)	4 June 1979	3 March 1980
Minister of State	Steve Paproski (Fitness and Amateur Sport and Multiculturalism)	4 June 1979	3 March 1980
Minister of State	Ron Huntington (Small Businesses and Industry)	4 June 1979	3 March 1980
Minister of State	Michael Wilson (International Trade)	4 June 1979	3 March 1980

== Succession ==
Ministries of Canada
Preceded by 20th Canadian Ministry	21st Canadian Ministry; 1979–1980	Succeeded by 22nd Canadian Ministry
