= 23rd Canadian Ministry =

Government cabinet of Canada (1984)

23rd Canadian Ministry 23e conseil des ministres du Canada
- 23rd ministry of Canada

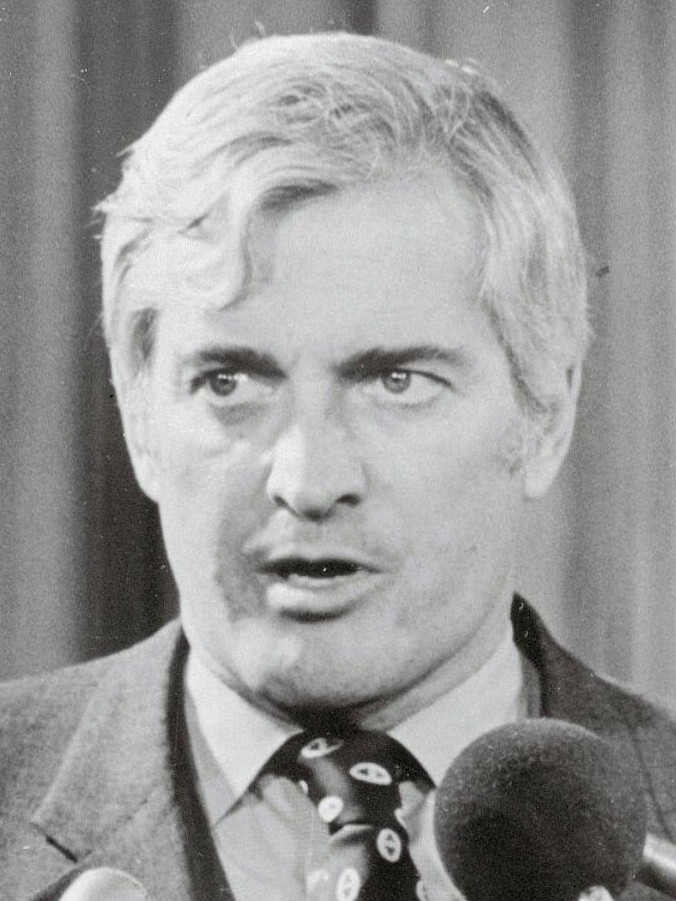
- John Turner
- Date formed: 30 June 1984
- Date dissolved: 17 September 1984

People and organizations
- Monarch: Elizabeth II
- Governor General: Jeanne Sauvé
- Prime Minister: John Turner
- Deputy Prime Minister: Jean Chrétien
- Member party: Liberal
- Status in legislature: Majority
- Opposition party: Progressive Conservative
- Opposition leader: Brian Mulroney

History
- Incoming formation: 1984 Liberal leadership election
- Outgoing formation: 1984 federal election
- Legislature term: 32nd Canadian Parliament
- Predecessor: 22nd Canadian Ministry
- Successor: 24th Canadian Ministry

The Twenty-Third Canadian Ministry was the cabinet chaired by Prime Minister John Turner. It governed Canada from 30 June 1984 to 17 September 1984, including only the last nine days of the 32nd Canadian Parliament. The government was formed by the Liberal Party of Canada.

== Ministers ==
All cabinet held their post through the 80 days of the Ministry.

Portfolio	Minister
Prime Minister	John Turner
Deputy Prime Minister	Jean Chrétien
Secretary of State for External Affairs: responsible for Canadian International Development Agency; responsible for La Francophonie	Jean Chrétien
Minister of Agriculture: responsible for the Canadian Dairy Commission	Ralph Ferguson
Minister of Communications	Ed Lumley
Minister of Regional Industrial Expansion; Minister of State for Science and Technology	Ed Lumley
Minister of Consumer and Corporate Affairs and Registrar General: responsible for the Metric Commission; responsible for Canada Post Corporation; responsible for the Standards Council of Canada	Judy Erola
Minister of State for Social Development: responsible for the Status of Women	Judy Erola
Minister of Employment and Immigration	John Roberts
Minister of Energy, Mines, and Resources	Gerald Regan
Minister of the Environment	Charles Caccia
Minister of Finance	Marc Lalonde
Minister of Fisheries and Oceans	Herb Breau
Minister of Indian Affairs and Northern Development	Doug Frith
Minister of International Trade	Francis Fox
Minister of Justice and Attorney General	Don Johnston
Minister of Labour	André Ouellet
President of the Privy Council; Leader of the Government in the House of Commons (parliamentary title)	André Ouellet
Minister of State for Economic and Regional Development role terminated effective September 1, 1984 by proclamation	André Ouellet
Minister of National Defence: responsible for Defence Construction Canada	Jean-Jacques Blais
Minister of National Health and Welfare	Monique Bégin
Minister of National Revenue	Roy MacLaren
Minister of Public Works: responsible for the National Capital Commission; responsible for the Canada Mortgage and Housing Corporation; responsible for the Royal Canadian Mint; Minister of Supply and Services and Receiver General	Charles Lapointe
Secretary of State for Canada	Serge Joyal
Solicitor General	Bob Kaplan
Minister of Transport	Lloyd Axworthy
Minister responsible for the Canadian Wheat Board	Lloyd Axworthy
President of the Treasury Board	Herb Gray
Minister of Veterans Affairs	Bennett Campbell
Leader of the Government in the Senate	Allan MacEachen
Minister of State (Regional Development)	Rémi Bujold
Minister of State (Multiculturalism)	David Collenette
Minister of State (Fitness and Amateur Sport); Minister of State (Youth)	Jean Lapierre
Minister of State (Mines)	Bill Rompkey
Minister of State (Transport)	Bill Rompkey
Minister of State (Small Businesses and Tourism)	David Smith

== Succession ==
Ministries of Canada
Preceded by 22nd Canadian Ministry	23rd Canadian Ministry; 1984	Succeeded by 24th Canadian Ministry
