= Minister for Science (Canada) =

Former federal cabinet office

Minister for Science of Canada
- Incumbent; Vacant
- Innovation, Science and Economic Development Canada
- Style: The Honourable
- Member of: Cabinet; Privy Council
- Appointer: Monarch (represented by the governor general); on the advice of the prime minister
- Term length: At His Majesty's pleasure
- Inaugural holder: Alastair Gillespie
- Formation: August 12, 1971
- Final holder: Kirsty Duncan
- Salary: $255,300 (2017) (CAD)
- Website: science.gc.ca

The minister of Science is a vacant office that was in the Cabinet of Canada and existed under various forms from 1971 to 2019, when the portfolio's responsibilities were absorbed into the innovation, science and industry portfolio.

== History ==
The portfolio was called the Minister of State for Science and Technology from 1971 until 1990, when a cabinet reshuffle saw the creation of two new science-related full cabinet positions: the Minister of Industry, Science and Technology, and the Minister for Science. The former combined aspects of the now-defunct post of Minister of Regional Industrial Expansion and the Minister of State for Science and Technology. While it was active, two of the three full ministers for science were simultaneously Minister of State for Small Business.

When Jean Chrétien came to power in 1993, he did not nominate a full minister for science. Instead, he created the position of Secretary of State (Science, Research and Development), which was assigned by Order-in-Council to assist the Minister of Industry. While this position subsequently changed name in 2008 to Minister of State (Science and Technology), its role did not change much until 2015.

In 2015 under the first Trudeau government, Kirsty Duncan was appointed to the newly created position of Minister of Science. However, this position remained under the same legal framework as its predecessor, responsible for assisting the senior portfolio of Minister of Innovation, Science and Economic Development (the restyled Minister of Industry). Duncan's portfolio was expected to oversee basic research, while Navdeep Bains would oversee applied science. In July 2018, the office's portfolio was expanded to include responsibility for Sport Canada and was renamed to Minister of Science and Sport.

Following the 2019 federal election, the portfolio became vacant and Bains' portfolio was expanded—he was appointed as the Minister of Innovation, Science and Industry (previously called, Innovation, Science and Economic Development).

== Ministers ==
Key:

Liberal Party of Canada
Conservative Party of Canada
Historical conservative parties: Progressive Conservative

| Portrait | Name | Term of office | | Political party | Ministry | Concurrent positions | Notes |
| Minister of State (Science and Technology), 1971–1990 | | | | | | | |
|---|---|---|---|---|---|---|---|
| | Alastair Gillespie | 12 Aug. 1971 | 26 Nov. 1972 | Lib | 20 (P. E. Trudeau) | | |
| | Jeanne Sauvé | 27 Nov. 1972 | 7 Aug. 1974 | Lib | 20 (P. E. Trudeau) | | |
| | Charles Mills Drury | 8 Aug. 1974 | 13 Sept. 1976 | Lib | 20 (P. E. Trudeau) | Minister of Public Works | |
| | James Hugh Faulkner | 14 Sept. 1976 | 15 Sept. 1977 | Lib | 20 (P. E. Trudeau) | Secretary of State of Canada | |
| | J. Judd Buchanan | 16 Sept. 1977 | 23 Nov. 1978 | Lib | 20 (P. E. Trudeau) | Minister of Public Works | |
| | Alastair Gillespie | 24 Nov. 1978 | 3 June 1979 | Lib | 20 (P. E. Trudeau) | Minister of Energy, Mines and Resources | |
| | Ramon John Hnatyshyn | 4 June 1979 | 8 Oct. 1979 | PC | 21 (Clark) | Minister of Energy, Mines and Resources | |
| | William Heward Grafftey | 8 Oct. 1979 | 2 March 1980 | PC | 21 (Clark) | | |
| | John Roberts | 3 March 1980 | 29 June 1984 | Lib | 22 (P. E. Trudeau) | Minister of the Environment (1980–83), Minister of Employment and Immigration (1983–94) | |
| | Edward Lumley | 30 June 1984 | 16 Sept. 1984 | Lib | 23 (Turner) | Minister of Communications | |
| | Thomas Edward Siddon | 17 Sept. 1984 | 19 Nov. 1985 | PC | 24 (Mulroney) | | |
| | Frank Oberle | 20 Nov. 1985 | 29 Jan. 1989 | PC | | | Oberle's term overlaps with Côté and de Cotret. He was assigned by Order in Council to assist the Minister of State for Science and Technology. |
| | Michel Côté | 11 Aug. 1987 | 26 Aug. 1987 | PC | | Minister of Regional Industrial Expansion | |
| | Robert René de Cotret | 27 Aug. 1987 | 29 Jan. 1989 | PC | | Minister of Regional Industrial Expansion | |
| | William Charles Winegard | 30 Jan. 1989 | 22 Feb. 1990 | PC | | | Winegard's term overlaps with Andre. Andre was formally appointed as both Minister of Regional Industrial Expansion and Minister of State for Science and Technology. Winegard was assigned by Order in Council to assist the Minister of State for Science and Technology. |
| | Harvie Andre | 30 Jan. 1989 | 22 Feb. 1990 | PC | | | Winegard's term overlaps with Andre. Andre was formally appointed as both Minister of Regional Industrial Expansion and Minister of State for Science and Technology. Winegard was assigned by Order in Council to assist the Minister of State for Science and Technology. |
| Minister for Science, 1990–1993 | | | | | | | |
| | William Charles Winegard | 23 Feb. 1990 | 3 Jan. 1993 | Progressive; Conservative | 24 (Mulroney) | | |
| | Tom Hockin | 4 Jan. 1993 | 24 June 1993 | Progressive; Conservative | 24 (Mulroney) | Minister of State (Small Businesses and Tourism) | |
| | Robert Douglas Nicholson | 25 June 1993 | 3 Nov. 1993 | Progressive; Conservative | 25 (Campbell) | Minister responsible for Small Businesses | |
| Secretary of State (Science, Research and Development), 1993–2003 | | | | | | | |
| | Jon Gerrard | 4 Nov. 1993 | 10 June 1997 | Lib | 26 (Chrétien) | | Assigned by Order in Council to assist the Minister of Industry |
| | Ronald J. Duhamel | 11 June 1997 | 2 Aug. 1999 | Lib | 26 (Chrétien) | | Assigned by Order in Council to assist the Minister of Industry |
| | Gilbert Normand | 3 Aug. 1999 | 14 Jan. 2002 | Lib | 26 (Chrétien) | | Assigned by Order in Council to assist the Minister of Industry |
| | Maurizio Bevilacqua | 15 Jan. 2002 | 25 May 2002 | Lib | 26 (Chrétien) | | Assigned by Order in Council to assist the Minister of Industry |
| | Rey Pagtakhan | 26 May 2002 | 11 Dec. 2003 | Lib | 26 (Chrétien) | | Assigned by Order in Council to assist the Minister of Industry |
| Minister of State (Science and Technology), 2008–2015 | | | | | | | |
| | Gary Goodyear | 30 Oct. 2008 | 15 July 2013 | Cons | 28 (Harper) | | Assigned by Order in Council to assist the Minister of Industry |
| | Greg Rickford | 15 July 2013 | 19 March 2014 | Cons | 28 (Harper) | | Assigned by Order in Council to assist the Minister of Industry |
| | Ed Holder | 19 March 2014 | 3 Nov. 2015 | Cons | 28 (Harper) | | Assigned by Order in Council to assist the Minister of Industry |
| Minister of Science, 2015–2018 | | | | | | | |
| | Kirsty Duncan | 4 Nov. 2015 | 18 Jul. 2018 | Lib | 29 (J. Trudeau) | | Assigned by Order in Council to assist the Minister of Industry |
| Minister of Science and Sport, 2018–2019 | | | | | | | |
| | Kirsty Duncan | 18 Jul. 2018 | 21 Nov. 2019 | Lib | 29 (J. Trudeau) | | |
