= 22nd Canadian Ministry =

Government cabinet of Canada (1980–1984)

22nd Canadian Ministry 22e conseil des ministres du Canada
- 22nd ministry of Canada

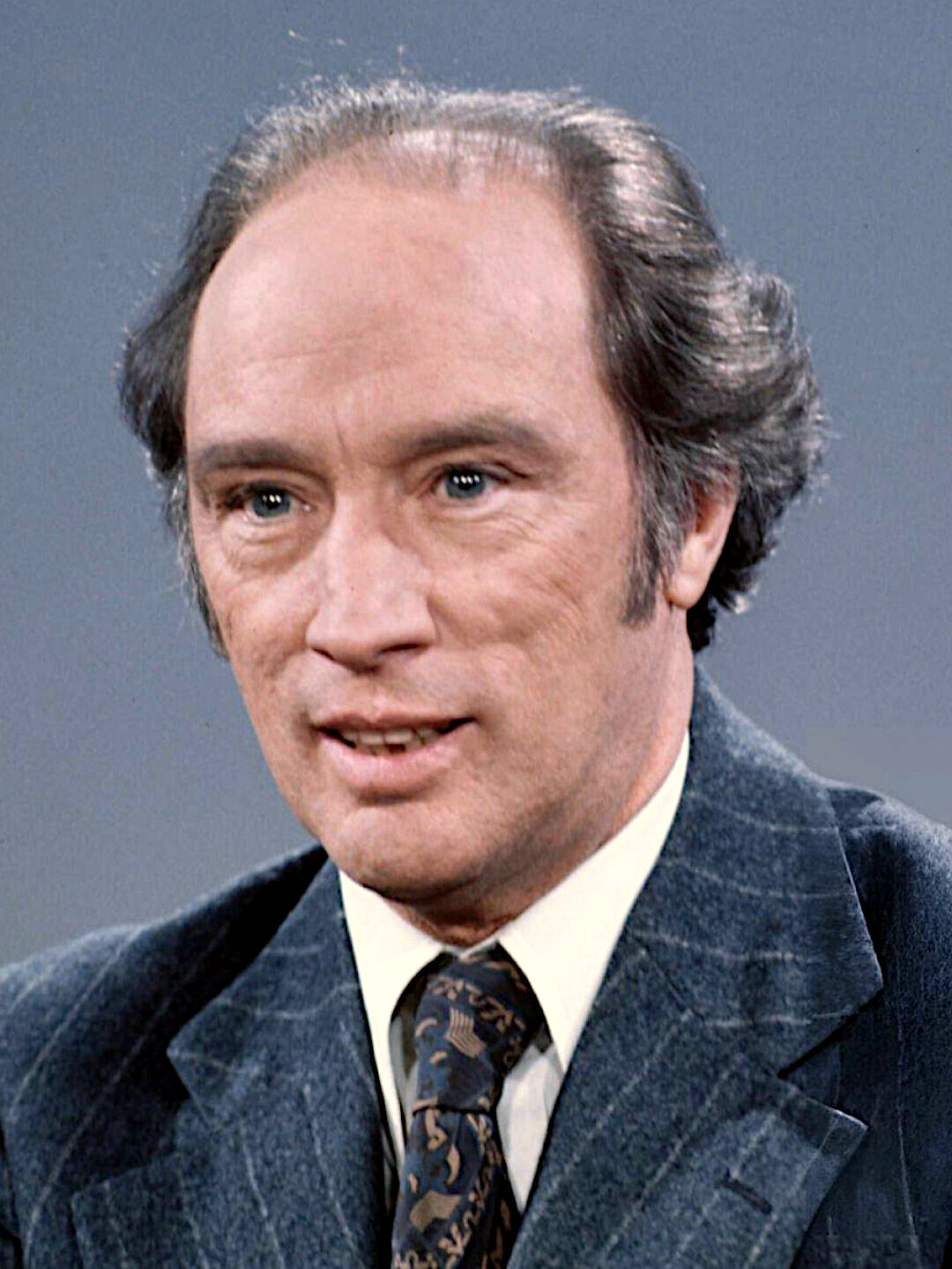
- Date formed: 3 March 1980
- Date dissolved: 30 June 1984

People and organizations
- Monarch: Elizabeth II
- Governor General: Edward Schreyer (1980–1984); Jeanne Sauve (1984)
- Prime Minister: Pierre Trudeau
- Prime Minister's history: Premierships of Pierre Trudeau
- Deputy Prime Minister: Allan MacEachen
- Member party: Liberal
- Status in legislature: Majority
- Opposition party: Progressive Conservative
- Opposition leader: Joe Clark (1980–1983); Erik Nielsen (1983); Brian Mulroney (1983–1994)

History
- Incoming formation: 1980 federal election
- Outgoing formation: 1984 Liberal leadership election
- Election: 1980
- Legislature term: 32nd Canadian Parliament
- Budgets: 1980, 1981, 1982, 1983, 1984
- Predecessor: 21st Canadian Ministry
- Successor: 23rd Canadian Ministry

The Twenty-Second Canadian Ministry was the second cabinet chaired by Prime Minister Pierre Trudeau. It governed Canada from 3 March 1980 to 30 June 1984, including most of the 32nd Canadian Parliament. The government was formed by the Liberal Party of Canada. Trudeau was also Prime Minister in the 20th Canadian Ministry (1968–1979).

== Ministers ==
Portfolio	Minister	Term	
Portfolio	Minister	Start	End
Prime Minister	Pierre Trudeau	3 March 1980	30 June 1984
Deputy Prime Minister	Allan MacEachen	3 March 1980	30 June 1984
Minister of Agriculture	Eugene Whelan	3 March 1980	30 June 1984
Minister of Communications	Francis Fox	3 March 1980	30 June 1984
Minister of Consumer and Corporate Affairs	André Ouellet	3 March 1980	11 August 1983
Minister of Consumer and Corporate Affairs	Judy Erola	12 August 1983	30 June 1984
Minister of State for Economic and Regional Development	Don Johnston	7 December 1983	30 June 1984
Minister of State for Economic Development	Bud Olson	3 March 1980	29 September 1982
Minister of State for Economic Development	Don Johnston	30 September 1982	6 December 1983
Minister of Employment and Immigration	Lloyd Axworthy	3 March 1980	11 August 1983
Minister of Employment and Immigration	John Roberts	12 August 1983	30 June 1984
Minister of Energy, Mines, and Resources	Marc Lalonde	3 March 1980	9 September 1982
Minister of Energy, Mines, and Resources	Jean Chrétien	10 September 1982	30 June 1984
Minister of the Environment	John Roberts	3 March 1980	11 August 1983
Minister of the Environment	Charles Caccia	12 August 1983	30 June 1984
Secretary of State for External Affairs	Mark MacGuigan	3 March 1980	9 September 1982
Secretary of State for External Affairs	Allan MacEachen	10 September 1982	30 June 1984
Minister of State for External Relations	Jean-Luc Pépin	3 March 1980	30 June 1984
Minister of Finance	Allan MacEachen	3 March 1980	9 September 1982
Minister of Finance	Marc Lalonde	10 September 1982	30 June 1984
Minister of Fisheries and Oceans	Roméo LeBlanc	3 March 1980	29 September 1982
Minister of Fisheries and Oceans	Pierre de Bané	30 September 1982	30 June 1984
Minister of Indian Affairs and Northern Development	John Munro	3 March 1980	30 June 1984
Minister of Industry, Trade, and Commerce	Herb Gray	3 March 1980	29 September 1982
Minister of Industry, Trade, and Commerce	Ed Lumley	30 September 1982	30 June 1984
Minister of State for International Trade	Gerald Regan	8 December 1983	30 June 1984
Minister of Justice and Attorney General	Jean Chrétien	3 March 1980	9 September 1982
Minister of Justice and Attorney General	Mark MacGuigan	10 September 1982	30 June 1984
Minister responsible for La Francophonie	Jean-Luc Pépin	12 August 1983	30 June 1984
Minister of Labour	Gerald Regan	3 March 1980	21 September 1981
Minister of Labour	Charles Caccia	22 September 1981	11 August 1983
Minister of Labour	André Ouellet	12 August 1983	30 June 1984
Leader of the Government in the Senate	Ray Perrault	3 March 1980	29 September 1982
Leader of the Government in the Senate	Bud Olson	30 September 1982	30 June 1984
Minister of National Defence	Gilles Lamontagne	3 March 1980	11 August 1983
Minister of National Defence	Jean-Jacques Blais	12 August 1983	30 June 1984
Minister of National Health and Welfare	Monique Bégin	3 March 1980	30 June 1984
Minister of National Revenue	Bill Rompkey	3 March 1980	29 September 1982
Minister of National Revenue	Pierre Bussières	30 September 1982	30 June 1984
Postmaster General	André Ouellet	3 March 1980	15 October 1981
President of the Privy Council	Yvon Pinard	3 March 1980	30 June 1984
Minister of Public Works	Paul Cosgrove	3 March 1980	29 September 1982
Minister of Public Works	Roméo LeBlanc	30 September 1982	30 June 1984
Minister of Regional Economic Expansion	Pierre de Bané	3 March 1980	11 January 1982
Minister of Regional Economic Expansion	Herb Gray	12 January 1982	29 September 1982
Minister of Regional Economic Expansion	Ed Lumley	30 September 1982	6 December 1983
Minister of Regional Industrial Expansion	Ed Lumley	30 September 1982	6 December 1983
Minister of State for Science and Technology	John Roberts	3 March 1980	30 June 1984
Secretary of State for Canada	Francis Fox	3 March 1980	21 September 1981
Secretary of State for Canada	Gerald Regan	22 September 1981	5 October 1982
Secretary of State for Canada	Serge Joyal	6 October 1982	30 June 1984
Minister of State for Social Development	Jean Chrétien	3 March 1980	9 September 1982
Minister of State for Social Development	Jack Austin	10 September 1982	30 June 1984
Solicitor General	Bob Kaplan	3 March 1980	30 June 1984
Minister of Supply and Services	Jean-Jacques Blais	3 March 1980	11 August 1983
Minister of Supply and Services	Charles Lapointe	12 August 1983	30 June 1984
Minister of Transport	Jean-Luc Pépin	3 March 1980	11 August 1983
Minister of Transport	Lloyd Axworthy	12 August 1983	30 June 1984
President of the Treasury Board	Don Johnston	3 March 1980	29 September 1982
President of the Treasury Board	Herb Gray	30 September 1982	30 June 1984
Minister of Veterans Affairs	Daniel J. MacDonald	3 March 1980	30 September 1980
Minister of Veterans Affairs	Gilles Lamontagne (acting)	1 October 1980	21 September 1981
Minister of Veterans Affairs	Bennett Campbell	22 September 1981	30 June 1984

== Succession ==
Ministries of Canada
Preceded by 21st Canadian Ministry	22nd Canadian Ministry; 1980–1984	Succeeded by 23rd Canadian Ministry
