= 25th Canadian Ministry =

Government cabinet of Canada (1993)

25th Canadian Ministry 25e conseil des ministres du Canada
- 25th ministry of Canada

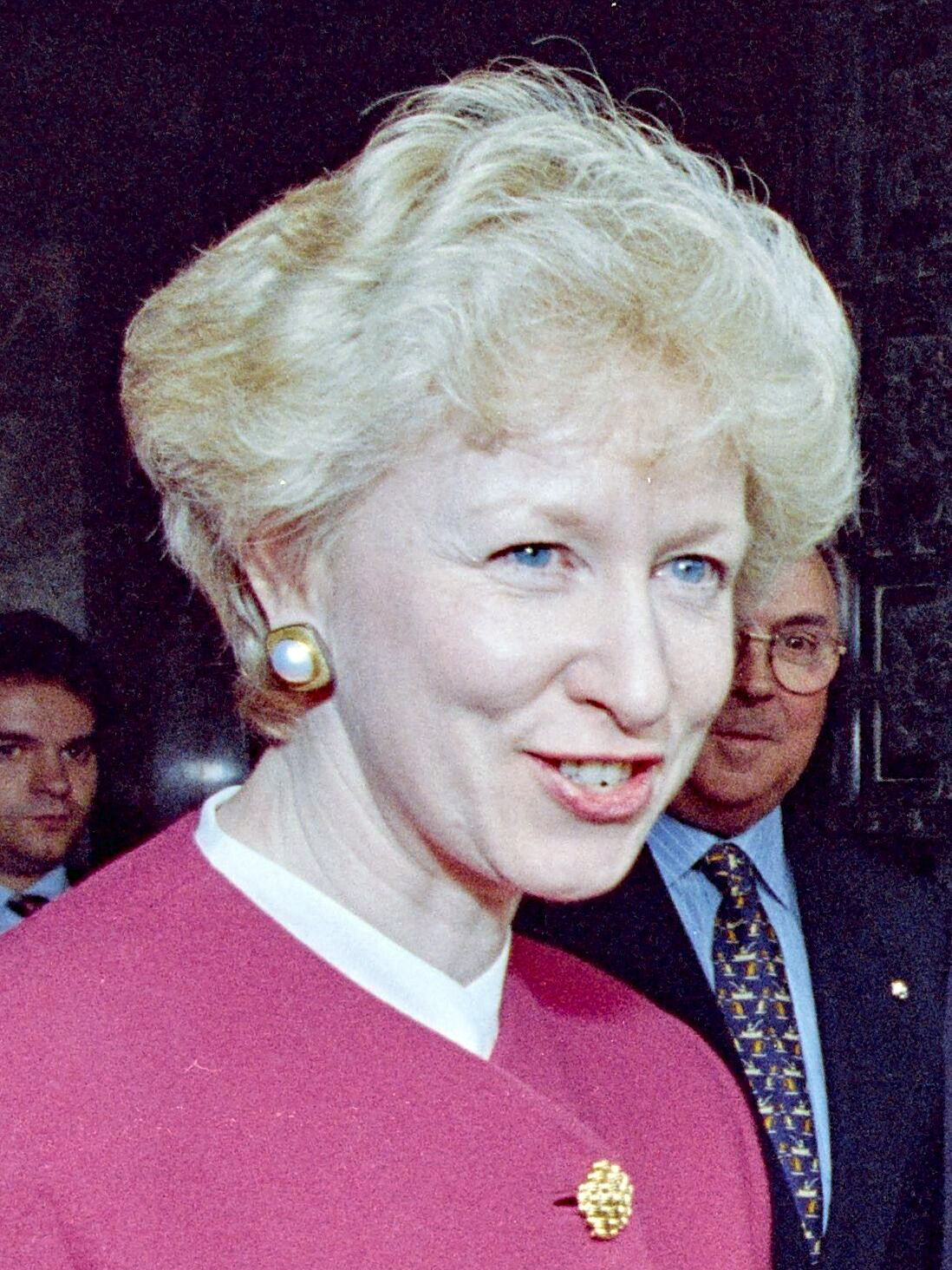
- Date formed: June 25, 1993
- Date dissolved: November 4, 1993

People and organizations
- Monarch: Elizabeth II
- Governor General: Ray Hnatyshyn
- Prime Minister: Kim Campbell
- Deputy Prime Minister: Jean Charest
- No. of ministers: 25
- Member party: Progressive Conservative
- Status in legislature: Majority
- Opposition party: Liberal
- Opposition leader: Jean Chrétien

History
- Incoming formation: 1993 PC leadership election
- Outgoing formation: 1993 federal election
- Legislature term: 34th Canadian Parliament
- Predecessor: 24th Canadian Ministry
- Successor: 26th Canadian Ministry

The Twenty-Fifth Canadian Ministry was the cabinet chaired by Prime Minister Kim Campbell. It governed Canada from 25 June 1993 to 4 November 1993, including only the last two months of the 34th Canadian Parliament until its dissolution in September of that year. It was smaller than the cabinet of her predecessor, Brian Mulroney.

The government was formed by the Progressive Conservative Party of Canada. It was the last ministry to be led by that party, which merged with the Alliance to form the Conservative Party of Canada in 2003 as part of the Canadian Unite the Right movement.

== Ministers ==
Portfolio	Minister	Term	
Portfolio	Minister	Start	End
Prime Minister	Kim Campbell	25 June 1993	4 November 1993
Deputy Prime Minister	Jean Charest	25 June 1993	4 November 1993
Minister of Agriculture	Charles Mayer	25 June 1993	4 November 1993
Minister of Amateur Sport	Mary Collins	25 June 1993	4 November 1993
Minister for the Atlantic Canada Opportunities Agency	Ross Reid	25 June 1993	4 November 1993
Minister responsible for the Canadian Dairy Commission	Charles Mayer	25 June 1993	4 November 1993
Minister responsible for Canadian International Development Agency	Perrin Beatty	25 June 1993	4 November 1993
Minister responsible for Canada Mortgage and Housing Corporation	Paul Dick	25 June 1993	4 November 1993
Minister responsible for Canada Post Corporation	Larry Schneider	25 June 1993	4 November 1993
Minister responsible for the Canadian Wheat Board	Charles Mayer	25 June 1993	4 November 1993
Minister of Communications	Monique Landry	25 June 1993	4 November 1993
Minister of Consumer and Corporate Affairs and Registrar General	Jean Charest	25 June 1993	4 November 1993
Minister responsible for Defence Construction Canada	Paul Dick	25 June 1993	4 November 1993
Minister of Employment and Immigration	Bernard Valcourt	25 June 1993	4 November 1993
Minister of Energy, Mines, and Resources	Bobbie Sparrow	25 June 1993	4 November 1993
Minister of the Environment	Pierre H. Vincent	25 June 1993	4 November 1993
Federal Interlocutor for Métis and Non-Status Indians	Jim Edwards	25 June 1993	4 November 1993
Secretary of State for External Affairs	Perrin Beatty	25 June 1993	4 November 1993
Minister for External Relations	Perrin Beatty	25 June 1993	4 November 1993
Minister responsible for Federal-Provincial Relations	Kim Campbell	25 June 1993	4 November 1993
Minister responsible for the Federal Office of Regional Development – Quebec	Jean Charest	25 June 1993	4 November 1993
Minister of Finance	Gilles Loiselle	25 June 1993	4 November 1993
Minister of Fisheries and Oceans	Ross Reid	25 June 1993	4 November 1993
Minister of Forestry	Bobbie Sparrow	25 June 1993	4 November 1993
Minister of Indian Affairs and Northern Development	Pauline Browes	25 June 1993	4 November 1993
Minister of Industry, Science and Technology	Jean Charest	25 June 1993	4 November 1993
Minister of International Trade	Tom Hockin	25 June 1993	4 November 1993
Minister of Justice and Attorney General	Pierre Blais	25 June 1993	4 November 1993
Minister responsible for La Francophonie	Perrin Beatty	25 June 1993	4 November 1993
Minister of Labour	Bernard Valcourt	25 June 1993	4 November 1993
Leader of the Government in the House of Commons	Doug Lewis	25 June 1993	4 November 1993
Leader of the Government in the Senate	Lowell Murray	25 June 1993	4 November 1993
Minister of Multiculturalism and Citizenship	Gerry Weiner	25 June 1993	4 November 1993
Minister responsible for National Capital Commission	Gerry Weiner	25 June 1993	4 November 1993
Associate Minister of National Defence	Vacant	25 June 1993	4 November 1993
Minister of National Defence	Tom Siddon	25 June 1993	4 November 1993
Minister of National Health and Welfare	Mary Collins	25 June 1993	4 November 1993
Minister of National Revenue	Garth Turner	25 June 1993	4 November 1993
President of the Privy Council	Pierre Blais	25 June 1993	4 November 1993
Minister of Public Security	Doug Lewis	25 June 1993	4 November 1993
Minister of Public Works	Paul Dick	25 June 1993	4 November 1993
Minister responsible for Royal Canadian Mint	Paul Dick	25 June 1993	4 November 1993
Minister for Science	Rob Nicholson	25 June 1993	4 November 1993
Secretary of State for Canada	Monique Landry	25 June 1993	4 November 1993
Solicitor General	Doug Lewis	25 June 1993	4 November 1993
Minister responsible for Small Business	Rob Nicholson	25 June 1993	4 November 1993
Minister of Small Communities and Rural Areas	Charles Mayer	25 June 1993	4 November 1993
Minister responsible for Standards Council of Canada	Jean Charest	25 June 1993	4 November 1993
Minister responsible for the Status of Women	Mary Collins	25 June 1993	4 November 1993
Minister of Supply and Services and Receiver General	Paul Dick	25 June 1993	4 November 1993
Minister of Transport	Jean Corbeil	25 June 1993	4 November 1993
President of the Treasury Board	Jim Edwards	25 June 1993	4 November 1993
Minister of Veterans Affairs	Peter McCreath	25 June 1993	4 November 1993
Minister of Western Economic Diversification	Larry Schneider	25 June 1993	4 November 1993

== Succession ==
Ministries of Canada
Preceded by 24th Canadian Ministry	25th Canadian Ministry; 1993	Succeeded by 26th Canadian Ministry
