= Roch La Salle =

Canadian politician (1928–2007)

The Honourable Roch La Salle PC

Leader of the Union Nationale
- In office January 19, 1981 – June 6, 1981
- Preceded by: Michel Le Moignan (acting)
- Succeeded by: Jean-Marc Béliveau

Minister of State (Without Portfolio)
- In office September 17, 1984 – February 19, 1987
- Prime Minister: Brian Mulroney
- Preceded by: Jack Austin (1982)
- Succeeded by: Position abolished

Minister of Public Works
- In office September 17, 1984 – June 29, 1986
- Prime Minister: Brian Mulroney
- Preceded by: Charles Lapointe
- Succeeded by: Stewart McInnes

Minister of Supply and Services Receiver General for Canada
- In office June 4, 1979 – March 2, 1980
- Prime Minister: Joe Clark
- Preceded by: Pierre de Bané
- Succeeded by: Jean-Jacques Blais

Member of Parliament for Joliette
- In office August 17, 1981 – November 21, 1988
- Preceded by: Himself
- Succeeded by: Gaby Larrivée
- In office June 25, 1968 – March 16, 1981
- Preceded by: Riding established
- Succeeded by: Himself

Personal details
- Born: August 6, 1928 Saint-Paul, Quebec, Canada
- Died: August 20, 2007 (aged 79) Saint-Charles-Borromée, Quebec, Canada
- Party: Progressive Conservative (1965–1971; 1974–1988); Independent (1971–1974)

Roch La Salle PC (August 6, 1928 – August 20, 2007) was a Canadian politician from the province of Quebec. He represented the riding of Joliette in the House of Commons of Canada for 20 years. He was re-elected six times during his tenure.

Born in St-Paul, La Salle had a career in public relations and sales when he first attempted to win a parliamentary seat as a Progressive Conservative in the 1965 federal election, running in Joliette—L'Assomption—Montcalm. He was defeated, but won on his next attempt in the renamed riding of Joliette in the 1968 election. He was one of only a handful of Quebec Tory members in that Parliament.

La Salle quit the party in 1971 to protest Tory leader Robert Stanfield's rejection of the concept that Canada was composed of "two nations" (deux nations) and that Quebec had the right to self-determination. He was re-elected as an independent candidate in the 1972 election with the support of the separatist Parti Québécois. He returned to the Tory caucus in early 1974.

Along with Heward Grafftey, he was one of only two Tory MPs elected from Quebec in the 1979 election that brought the Conservatives to power under Joe Clark. La Salle served as Minister of Supply and Services in the short-lived (1979–80) Clark government.

La Salle was the only Quebec Tory MP returned in the 1980 election, only surviving in his own riding by 389 votes. In early 1981, he resigned his seat in order to move to provincial politics and take the leadership of the Union Nationale (UN) political party prior to the 1981 Quebec provincial election. La Salle chose not run in his home town of Joliette because the riding was then represented by an old friend of his, Guy Chevrette, a member of the PQ and Party Whip. Instead, he ran in the neighbouring riding of Berthier. The Union Nationale lost all five of its remaining seats as the PQ won a crushing victory. He then ran in a by-election that was called later that year to fill the vacancy his resignation had created, and won handily.

When the Tories again formed government after the 1984 election, this time under Brian Mulroney, La Salle became Minister of Public Works. He resigned from Cabinet in 1987 after being charged with accepting a bribe and influence peddling. He denied any wrongdoing, but did not run in the 1988 election. The criminal case against him was eventually dropped.

La Salle died on 20 August 2007 in a hospital in Saint-Charles-Borromée. He was 79 years of age.

Former Prime Minister Brian Mulroney said in a statement that he was saddened to hear of La Salle's death, calling him an example of a politician who was close to the people in his riding.

Parliament of Canada
Preceded by None	Member of Parliament for Joliette; 1968–1988	Succeeded by Gaby Larrivée (PC)
24th Canadian Ministry (1984–1993) – Cabinet of Brian Mulroney
Cabinet post (1)
Predecessor	Office	Successor
Charles Lapointe (Liberal)	Minister of Public Works; 1984–1986	Stewart McInnes (PC)
21st Canadian Ministry (1979–1980) – Cabinet of Joe Clark
Cabinet post (1)
Predecessor	Office	Successor
Pierre De Bané (Liberal)	Minister of Supply and Services; 1979–1980	Jean-Jacques Blais (Liberal)
Party political offices
Preceded by Michel Le Moignan (interim)	Leader of the Union Nationale; 1981	Succeeded by Jean-Marc Béliveau
