= Trudeau ministry =

Trudeau ministry can refer to:

- 20th Canadian Ministry, led by Prime Minister Pierre Trudeau from 1968–1979
- 22nd Canadian Ministry, led by Prime Minister Pierre Trudeau from 1980–1984
- 29th Canadian Ministry, led by Prime Minister Justin Trudeau from 2015–2025
