= President of the Treasury Board =

Canadian Cabinet ministerial position

- Présidente du Conseil du Trésor
- Incumbent; Shafqat Ali since May 13, 2025
- Treasury Board of Canada (Secretariat)
- Style: The Honourable
- Member of: Parliament; Privy Council; Cabinet
- Reports to: Parliament; Prime Minister
- Appointer: Monarch (represented by the governor general); on the advice of the prime minister
- Term length: At His Majesty's pleasure
- Inaugural holder: Edgar Benson
- Formation: October 1, 1966
- Salary: CA$299,900 (2024)
- Website: www.tbs-sct.gc.ca

The president of the Treasury Board (French: présidente du Conseil du Trésor) is a minister of the Crown in the Canadian Cabinet. The president is the chair of the Treasury Board of Canada (a committee of Cabinet in the Privy Council) and is the minister responsible for the Treasury Board Secretariat, the central agency which is responsible for accounting for the Government of Canada's fiscal operations.

The president of the Treasury Board has been Shafqat Ali since May 13, 2025.

== History and overview ==
As a ministerial position, the office of Treasury Board president was created in the Cabinet in 1966 when the Treasury Board Secretariat became a full-fledged department of the federal government. Prior to 1966, the minister of finance was ex officio the chairman of the Treasury Board, as the Secretariat was part of the Department of Finance since Confederation (1867).

The Secretariat is a central agency and the administrative arm of the Treasury Board. Technically, the board is a Cabinet committee of the Privy Council, and is responsible for managing the government's fiscal and administrative responsibilities, including management of the civil service and oversight of expenditures.

The formal role of the president is to chair the Treasury Board. The officeholder is responsible for carrying out the management of the government through operationalizing the policies and programs approved by Cabinet and through providing federal departments with the necessary resources, among other things.

== List of presidents of the Treasury Board ==
This is a list of presidents of the Treasury Board since 1966, when the office became a full ministerial position in Cabinet. Prior to 1966, the Treasury Board Secretariat belonged to the Department of Finance and, as such, the minister of finance was ex officio the chairman of the Treasury Board.

Key:

Liberal Party of Canada
Progressive Conservative Party of Canada
Conservative Party of Canada

No.	Portrait	Name	Term of office		Political party	Ministry
1		Edgar Benson	October 1, 1966	April 20, 1968	Liberal	19 (Pearson)
1		Edgar Benson	April 20, 1968	July 5, 1968	Liberal	20 (P. E. Trudeau)
2		Charles Mills Drury	July 5, 1968	August 7, 1974	Liberal	20 (P. E. Trudeau)
3		Jean Chrétien	August 8, 1974	September 13, 1976	Liberal	20 (P. E. Trudeau)
4		Robert Knight Andras	September 14, 1976	November 23, 1978	Liberal	20 (P. E. Trudeau)
5		Judd Buchanan	November 24, 1978	June 3, 1979	Liberal	20 (P. E. Trudeau)
6		Sinclair Stevens	June 4, 1979	March 2, 1980	Progressive Conservative	21 (Clark)
7		Donald Johnston	March 3, 1980	September 29, 1982	Liberal	22 (P. E. Trudeau)
8		Herb Gray	September 30, 1982	June 29, 1984	Liberal	22 (P. E. Trudeau)
8		Herb Gray	June 30, 1984	September 16, 1984	Liberal	23 (Turner)
9		Robert de Cotret	September 17, 1984	August 26, 1987	Progressive Conservative	24 (Mulroney)
10		Don Mazankowski	August 27, 1987	March 30, 1988	Progressive Conservative	24 (Mulroney)
11		Pat Carney	March 31, 1988	December 7, 1988	Progressive Conservative	24 (Mulroney)
–		Doug Lewis (Acting)	December 8, 1988	January 29, 1989	Progressive Conservative	24 (Mulroney)
(9)		Robert de Cotret (2nd time)	January 30, 1989	September 19, 1990	Progressive Conservative	24 (Mulroney)
12		Gilles Loiselle	September 20, 1990	June 24, 1993	Progressive Conservative	24 (Mulroney)
13		Jim Edwards	June 25, 1993	November 3, 1993	Progressive Conservative	25 (Campbell)
14		Art Eggleton	November 4, 1993	January 24, 1996	Liberal	26 (Chrétien)
15		Marcel Massé	January 25, 1996	August 2, 1999	Liberal	26 (Chrétien)
16		Lucienne Robillard	August 3, 1999	December 11, 2003	Liberal	26 (Chrétien)
17		Reg Alcock	December 12, 2003	February 5, 2006	Liberal	27 (Martin)
18		John Baird	February 6, 2006	January 3, 2007	Conservative	28 (Harper)
19		Vic Toews	January 4, 2007	January 19, 2010	Conservative	28 (Harper)
20		Stockwell Day	January 19, 2010	May 18, 2011	Conservative	28 (Harper)
21		Tony Clement	May 18, 2011	November 4, 2015	Conservative	28 (Harper)
22		Scott Brison	November 4, 2015	January 14, 2019	Liberal	29 (J. Trudeau)
23		Jane Philpott	January 14, 2019	March 4, 2019	Liberal	29 (J. Trudeau)
–		Carla Qualtrough (Acting)	March 4, 2019	March 18, 2019	Liberal	29 (J. Trudeau)
24		Joyce Murray	March 18, 2019	November 20, 2019	Liberal	29 (J. Trudeau)
25		Jean-Yves Duclos	November 20, 2019	October 26, 2021	Liberal	29 (J. Trudeau)
26		Mona Fortier	October 26, 2021	July 26, 2023	Liberal	29 (J. Trudeau)
27		Anita Anand	July 26, 2023	December 20, 2024	Liberal	29 (J. Trudeau)
28		Ginette Petitpas Taylor	December 20, 2024	March 14, 2025	Liberal	29 (J. Trudeau)
28		Ginette Petitpas Taylor	March 14, 2025	May 13, 2025	Liberal	30 (Carney)
29		Shafqat Ali	May 13, 2025	Incumbent	Liberal	30 (Carney)
