= Minister of Public Works (Canada) =

Former position in the Cabinet of Canada

The Minister of Public Works was a position in the Cabinet of Canada who oversaw the public works portfolio of the federal government.

The office was established upon Confederation (1 July 1867) by Order-in-Council, and was given statutory basis later that year on December 21, through Statute 31 Victoria, c. 12. On 12 July 1996, as part of substantial governmental reorganization under the leadership of Jean Chrétien, the position was merged with that of the Minister of Supply and Services to create the office of Minister of Public Works and Government Services.

== Ministers ==
No.	Name	Period in office	Ministry	
1.	William McDougall	July 1, 1867 – September 27, 1869	1st (Macdonald)	
*	Hector-Louis Langevin (acting)	September 28, 1869 – December 7, 1869	1st (Macdonald)	
2.	Hector-Louis Langevin	December 8, 1869 – November 5, 1873	1st (Macdonald)	
3.	Alexander Mackenzie	November 7, 1873 – October 8, 1878	2nd (himself)	
4	Sir Charles Tupper	October 19, 1878 – May 19, 1879	3rd (Macdonald)	
–	Hector-Louis Langevin (second time)	May 20, 1879 – June 6, 1891	3rd (Macdonald)	
–	Hector-Louis Langevin (second time)	June 16, 1891 – August 11, 1891	4th (Abbott)	
5.	Frank Smith	August 14, 1891 – January 10, 1892	4th (Abbott)	
6.	Joseph-Aldric Ouimet	January 11, 1892 – November 24, 1892	4th (Abbott)	
6.	Joseph-Aldric Ouimet	December 5, 1892 – December 12, 1894	5th (Thompson)	
6.	Joseph-Aldric Ouimet	December 21, 1894 – April 27, 1896	6th (Bowell)	
7.	Alphonse Desjardins	May 1, 1896 – July 8, 1896	7th (Tupper)	
8.	Joseph-Israël Tarte	July 13, 1896 – October 21, 1902	8th (Laurier)	
9.	James Sutherland	November 11, 1902 – May 3, 1905	8th (Laurier)	
10.	Charles Smith Hyman	May 22, 1905 – August 29, 1907	8th (Laurier)	
11.	William Pugsley	August 30, 1907 – October 6, 1911	8th (Laurier)	
12.	Frederick Debartzch Monk	October 10, 1911 – October 28, 1912	9th (Borden)	
13.	Robert Rogers	October 29, 191 – August 22, 1917	9th (Borden)	
14.	Charles Colquhoun Ballantyne	October 3, 1917 – October 12, 1917	9th (Borden)	
15.	Frank Broadstreet Carvell	October 13, 1917 – August 1, 1919	9th (Borden)	10th (Borden)
*	John Dowsley Reid (acting)	August 6, 1919 – September 2, 1919		10th (Borden)
16.	Arthur Lewis Sifton	September 3, 1919 – December 30, 1919		10th (Borden)
*	John Dowsley Reid (acting)	December 31, 1919 – July 10, 1920		10th (Borden)
*	John Dowsley Reid (acting)	July 10, 1920 – July 12, 1920	11th (Meighen)	
17.	Fleming Blanchard McCurdy	July 13, 1920 – December 29, 1921	11th (Meighen)	
18.	Hewitt Bostock	December 29, 1921 – February 2, 1922	12th (King)	
19.	James Horace King	February 3, 1922 – June 28, 1926	12th (King)	
*	Sir George Halsey Perley (acting)	June 29, 1926 – July 12, 1926	13th (Meighen)	
20.	Edmond Baird Ryckman	July 13, 1926 – September 25, 1926	13th (Meighen)	
21.	John Campbell Elliott	September 25, 1926 – August 7, 1930	14th (King)	
22.	Hugh Alexander Stewart	August 7, 1930 – October 23, 1935	15th (Bennett)	
23.	Pierre Joseph Arthur Cardin	October 23, 1935 – May 12, 1942	16th (King)	
*	Joseph-Enoil Michaud (acting)	May 13, 1942 – October 6, 1942	16th (King)	
25.	Alphonse Fournier	October 7, 1942 – November 15, 1948	16th (King)	
25.	Alphonse Fournier	November 15, 1948 – June 11, 1953	17th (St. Laurent)	
*	Walter Edward Harris	June 12, 1953 – September 16, 1953	17th (St. Laurent)	
24.	Robert Henry Winters	September 17, 1953 – June 21, 1957	17th (St. Laurent)	
25.	Howard Charles Green	June 21, 1957 – August 19, 1959	18th (Diefenbaker)	
26.	David James Walker	August 20, 1959 – July 12, 1962	18th (Diefenbaker)	
*	Howard Charles Green (acting)	July 18, 1962 – August 8, 1962	18th (Diefenbaker)	
27.	Edmund Davie Fulton	August 9, 1962 – April 22, 1963	18th (Diefenbaker)	
28.	Jean-Paul Deschatelets	April 22, 1963 – February 11, 1965	19th (Pearson)	
29.	Louis Joseph Lucien Cardin	February 15, 1965 – July 6, 1965	19th (Pearson)	
32.	George James McIlraith	July 7, 1965 – April 20, 1968	19th (Pearson)	
32.	George James McIlraith	April 20, 1968 – July 5, 1968	20th (Trudeau Sr.)	
30.	Arthur Laing	July 5, 1968 – January 27, 1972	20th (Trudeau Sr.)	
31.	Jean-Eudes Dubé	January 28, 1972 – August 7, 1974	20th (Trudeau Sr.)	
32.	Charles Mills Drury	August 8, 1974 – September 13, 1976	20th (Trudeau Sr.)	
33.	J. Judd Buchanan	September 14, 1976 – November 23, 1978	20th (Trudeau Sr.)	
34.	André Ouellet	November 24, 1978 – June 3, 1979	20th (Trudeau Sr.)	
35.	Erik Nielsen	June 4, 1979 – March 2, 1980	21st (Clark)	
36.	Paul James Cosgrove	March 3, 1980 – September 29, 1982	22nd (Trudeau Sr.)	
37.	Roméo LeBlanc	September 30, 1982 – June 29, 1984	22nd (Trudeau Sr.)	
38.	Charles Lapointe	June 30, 1984 – September 16, 1984	23rd (Turner)	
39.	Roch La Salle	September 17, 1984 – June 29, 1986	24th (Mulroney)	
40.	Stewart McInnes	June 30, 1986 – December 7, 1988	24th (Mulroney)	
*	Otto Jelinek	December 8, 1988 – January 29, 1989	24th (Mulroney)	
41.	Elmer MacIntosh MacKay	January 30, 1989 – June 24, 1993	24th (Mulroney)	
42.	Paul Wyatt Dick	June 24, 1993 – November 3, 1993	25th (Campbell)	
43.	David Charles Dingwall	November 4, 1993 – January 24, 1996	26th (Chrétien)	
44.	Diane Marleau	January 25, 1996 – July 11, 1996	26th (Chrétien)	
After 1996, see Minister of Public Works and Government Services.
