= Don Mazankowski =

Canadian politician (1935–2020)

The Right Honourable Don Mazankowski PC CC AOE

4th Deputy Prime Minister of Canada
- In office June 30, 1986 – June 25, 1993
- Prime Minister: Brian Mulroney
- Preceded by: Erik Nielsen
- Succeeded by: Jean Charest

Minister of Finance
- In office April 21, 1991 – June 24, 1993
- Prime Minister: Brian Mulroney
- Preceded by: Michael Wilson
- Succeeded by: Gilles Loiselle

Member of Parliament for Vegreville
- In office June 25, 1968 – October 25, 1993
- Preceded by: Frank Fane
- Succeeded by: Leon Benoit

More...

Personal details
- Born: Donald Frank Mazankowski; July 27, 1935 Viking, Alberta, Canada
- Died: October 27, 2020 (aged 85)
- Party: Progressive Conservative
- Occupation: Businessman, consultant

Donald Frank Mazankowski PC CC AOE (July 27, 1935 – October 27, 2020) was a Canadian politician who served as a cabinet minister under prime ministers Joe Clark and Brian Mulroney, including as deputy prime minister under Mulroney.

After retiring from politics in 1993, Mazankowski was a consultant with the law firm of Gowling Lafleur Henderson LLP. He also served as a director or trustee for several companies, including Weyerhaeuser Co., ATCO Ltd., Shaw Communications Inc., and Power Corporation of Canada.

== Early life ==
Mazankowski was born in Viking, Alberta, on July 27, 1935. His parents, Frank and Dora (Lonowski), were of Polish descent and had come to Canada from the United States in 1921. After he completed high school, Mazankowski moved to Chicago, where he worked as a dispatcher in a trucking business. He later returned to Alberta and started his own gas station in Innisfree. Together with his brother Ray, he opened a car dealership on the outskirts of Vegreville.

== Political career ==
Mazankowski's first taste of politics came during his five-year tenure as a trustee of a local separate school. This inspired him to seek the Progressive Conservative Party nomination in his local riding of Vegreville, which he won in 1968. During the federal election that year, he was elected to the House of Commons of Canada as the Member of Parliament (MP) for Vegreville.

During the short-lived Clark government, Mazankowski served as Minister of Transport. When the Tories returned to power under Mulroney in the 1984 election, Mazankowski again became Minister of Transport. In 1986, he was promoted to Deputy Prime Minister and Government House Leader. Mazankowski became one of the most widely known public faces of the Tory government. He played an especially important role as an advocate for the Canada–United States Free Trade Agreement and the North American Free Trade Agreement.

A bill to restore the death penalty was defeated by the House of Commons on June 30, 1987, in a 148–127 vote. (The then Liberal government led by Pierre Trudeau had abolished the death penalty in Canada in 1976.) While Prime Minister Mulroney, Minister of Justice Ray Hnatyshyn, and Minister of External Affairs Clark opposed the bill, Mazankowski and most PC MPs supported it. He became Finance Minister during a cabinet reshuffle in April 1991, replacing Michael Wilson.

== After politics ==
Mazankowski retired from politics on June 7, 1993. When Kim Campbell succeeded Mulroney as PC leader and prime minister two weeks later, Mazankowski was replaced as Finance Minister by Gilles Loiselle. Mazankowski did not run in the 1993 election that saw his party reduced to two seats in the House of Commons. He returned to the private sector and served on the boards of several organizations, including the University of Alberta. Mazankowski declined an offer of a Senate seat made by Mulroney in his final days as prime minister.

In August 2001, Ralph Klein, the Premier of Alberta at the time, established the Premier's Advisory Council on Health, with Mazankowski as chair. He put the Council of twelve men in charge of reviewing Alberta's health care system and offering recommendations for health reform. The Council released its report on January 8, 2002, and the Alberta government accepted all of the recommendations. The report focused on market-consumerism with emphasis on consumer choice and market competition.

Mazankowski played an important role in the merger of the Progressive Conservative Party and the Canadian Alliance in 2003, and he was a strong supporter of the new Conservative Party of Canada. Mazankowski died on October 27, 2020, at the age of 85.

== Honours ==
In 1992, Mazankowski was one of a few prominent Canadians who were given the honorific style of "Right Honourable" without having held any of the offices that would entitle them to it automatically.

In 2000, Mazankowski was made an Officer of the Order of Canada, and he was promoted to Companion in 2013. He was inducted to the Alberta Order of Excellence in 2003.

== Archives ==
There is a Donald Mazankowski fonds at Library and Archives Canada.

24th Canadian Ministry (1984–1993) – Cabinet of Brian Mulroney
Cabinet posts (6)
| Predecessor | Office | Successor |
| Erik Nielsen | Deputy Prime Minister of Canada; 1986–1993 | Jean Charest |
| Michael Wilson | Minister of Finance; 1991–1993 | Gilles Loiselle |
| Ray Hnatyshyn | President of the Queen's Privy Council for Canada; 1986–1991 | Joe Clark |
| John Wise | Minister of Agriculture; 1988–1991 | Bill McKnight |
| Robert de Cotret | President of the Treasury Board; 1987–1988 | Pat Carney |
| Lloyd Axworthy | Minister of Transport; 1984–1986 second time | John Crosbie |
Special Parliamentary Responsibilities
| Predecessor | Title | Successor |
| Ray Hnatyshyn | Leader of the Government in the House of Commons; 1986–1989 | Doug Lewis |
21st Canadian Ministry (1979–1980) – Cabinet of Joe Clark
Cabinet post (1)
| Predecessor | Office | Successor |
| Otto Lang | Minister of Transport; 1979–1980 first time | Jean-Luc Pépin |
