= Minister of Consumer and Corporate Affairs =

Canadian cabinet position (1967–1995)

The Minister of Consumer and Corporate Affairs was a Government of Canada cabinet position held between 1967 and 1995. The minister was responsible for consumer and corporate issues relating to legislation at the federal level.

The minister was also the Registrar General of Canada.

== Ministers ==
=== Minister of Consumer and Corporate Affairs (1967–1995) ===
No.	Portrait	Name	Term of office		Political party	Ministry
1.		John Turner	December 21, 1967	April 20, 1968	Liberal	19 (Pearson)
1.		John Turner	April 20, 1968	July 5, 1968	Liberal	20 (P. E. Trudeau)
2.		Ron Basford	July 5, 1968	January 27, 1972	Liberal	20 (P. E. Trudeau)
3.		Bob Andras	January 28, 1972	November 26, 1972	Liberal	20 (P. E. Trudeau)
4.		Herb Gray	November 27, 1972	August 7, 1974	Liberal	20 (P. E. Trudeau)
5.		André Ouellet	August 8, 1974	March 15, 1976	Liberal	20 (P. E. Trudeau)
*		Bryce Mackasey (acting)	March 16, 1976	April 7, 1976	Liberal	20 (P. E. Trudeau)
6.		Bryce Mackasey	April 8, 1976	September 13, 1976	Liberal	20 (P. E. Trudeau)
7.		Tony Abbott (Ontario politician)	September 14, 1976	September 15, 1977	Liberal	20 (P. E. Trudeau)
8.		Warren Allmand	September 16, 1977	June 3, 1979	Liberal	20 (P. E. Trudeau)
9.		Allan Lawrence	June 4, 1979	March 2, 1980	Progressive; Conservative	21 (Clark)
10.		André Ouellet	March 3, 1980	August 11, 1983	Liberal	22 (P. E. Trudeau)
11.		Judy Erola	August 12, 1983	June 29, 1984	Liberal	22 (P. E. Trudeau)
11.		Judy Erola	June 30, 1984	September 16, 1984	Liberal	23 (Turner)
12.		Michel Côté	September 17, 1984	June 29, 1986	Progressive; Conservative	24 (Mulroney)
13.		Harvie Andre	June 30, 1986	January 29, 1989	Progressive; Conservative	24 (Mulroney)
14.		Bernard Valcourt	January 30, 1989	August 1, 1989	Progressive; Conservative	24 (Mulroney)
*		Harvie Andre (acting)	August 2, 1989	February 22, 1990	Progressive; Conservative	24 (Mulroney)
15.		Pierre Blais	February 23, 1990	January 3, 1993	Progressive; Conservative	24 (Mulroney)
16.		Pierre H. Vincent	January 4, 1990	June 24, 1993	Progressive; Conservative	24 (Mulroney)
17.		Jean Charest styled as Minister of Industry	June 25, 1993	November 3, 1993	Progressive; Conservative	25 (Campbell)
18.		John Manley styled as Minister of Industry	November 4, 1993	March 28, 1995	Liberal	26 (Chrétien)

The position of Minister of Consumer and Corporate Affairs was abolished and its duties inherited by the new position of Minister of Industry (list) on March 29, 1995.
