= Lowell Murray =

Canadian senator (born 1936)

The Honourable Lowell Murray PC

Leader of the Government in the Senate
- In office June 30, 1986 – November 3, 1993
- Prime Minister: Brian Mulroney; Kim Campbell
- Deputy: C. William Doody; John Lynch-Staunton
- Whip: Orville Howard Phillips; William McDonough Kelly
- Preceded by: Duff Roblin
- Succeeded by: Joyce Fairbairn

Minister of Communications
- Acting
- In office December 8, 1988 – January 29, 1989
- Prime Minister: Brian Mulroney
- Preceded by: Flora MacDonald
- Succeeded by: Marcel Masse

Minister for the purposes of the Atlantic Canada Opportunities Agency Act
- In office June 6, 1987 – September 15, 1988
- Prime Minister: Brian Mulroney
- Preceded by: Position established
- Succeeded by: Gerald Merrithew

Minister of State (Federal-Provincial Relations)
- In office June 30, 1986 – April 21, 1991
- Prime Minister: Brian Mulroney
- Preceded by: William H. Jarvis (1980)
- Succeeded by: Joe Clark (as Minister responsible for Constitutional Affairs)

Canadian Senator from Ontario
- In office September 13, 1979 – September 26, 2011
- Nominated by: Joe Clark
- Appointed by: Edward Schreyer
- Preceded by: Eugene Forsey
- Succeeded by: Asha Seth (2012)

Personal details
- Born: 26 September 1936 (age 89) New Waterford, Nova Scotia, Canada
- Party: Progressive Conservative
- Spouse: Colleen Elaine MacDonald

Lowell Murray, PC (born 26 September 1936) is a former Canadian senator and long-time activist with the federal Progressive Conservative Party.

== Education ==
Murray graduated from St. Francis Xavier University in 1955. He met 16-year-old Brian Mulroney there; the two became close friends and associates in the PC Party. He later earned an MPA from Queen's University.

In 1961, he became an assistant to federal justice minister Davie Fulton. Later, he served as chief of staff to Progressive Conservative leader Robert Stanfield and then was New Brunswick premier Richard Hatfield's senior advisor.

== Appointment to the Senate ==
Murray was appointed to the Senate on the recommendation of Prime Minister Joe Clark in 1979. In 1986, Prime Minister Mulroney appointed Murray to the Cabinet as Leader of the Government in the Senate, and variously as Minister of State for Federal-Provincial Relations (until 21 April 1991), Minister responsible for the Atlantic Canada Opportunities Agency (June 1987 to September 1988), and Acting Minister of Communications (December 1988 to 30 January 1989). Murray served as Government Leader in the Senate until the defeat of the government of Prime Minister Kim Campbell in 1993.

In 2003, Murray joined with Clark to oppose the merger of the Progressive Conservative Party with the Canadian Alliance to form the Conservative Party of Canada. When the new party was created, he refused to join the new Conservative caucus, and, until his retirement remained one of two senators (the other being Elaine McCoy) to sit as "Progressive Conservatives" even though the federal Progressive Conservative Party had been formally dissolved.

Murray was the last senator appointed on the advice of Prime Minister Clark to sit in the Senate. He was the longest-serving member of the body upon his mandatory retirement from the Senate on 26 September 2011, when he attained the age of 75.

== Archives ==
There is a Lowell Murray fonds at Library and Archives Canada.

== See also ==
- List of Ontario senators

25th Canadian Ministry (1993) – Cabinet of Kim Campbell
Cabinet post (1)
| Predecessor | Office | Successor |
|---|---|---|
| cont'd from 24th Ministry | Leader of the Government in the Senate; 1993 | Joyce Fairbairn |
24th Canadian Ministry (1984–1993) – Cabinet of Brian Mulroney
Cabinet post (1)
| Predecessor | Office | Successor |
| Duff Roblin | Leader of the Government in the Senate; 1986–1993 | cont'd into 25th Ministry |
