= Guillaume-André Fauteux =

Canadian politician

The Hon. Guillaume-André Fauteux

Senator for De Salaberry, Quebec
- In office December 30, 1933 – September 10, 1940
- Appointed by: R. B. Bennett
- Preceded by: Frédéric Liguori Béique
- Succeeded by: Léon Mercier Gouin

Personal details
- Born: October 20, 1874 St-Benoît, Quebec
- Died: September 10, 1940 (aged 65)
- Party: Conservative
- Cabinet: Solicitor General of Canada (1921 & 1926)

Guillaume-André Fauteux, PC, KC (20 October 1874 – 10 September 1940) was a Canadian politician.

Born in St-Benoît, Quebec, a Conservative, he was defeated six times (1908, 1921, 1925, 1925 by-election, 1926, and 1930) while attempting to become a Member of Parliament.

From October 1, 1921 to December 28, 1921, he was the Solicitor General of Canada. From August 23, 1926 to September 24, 1926, during Arthur Meighen's short lived second term, he was the Solicitor General of Canada.

In 1933, he was appointed to the Senate representing the senatorial division of De Salaberry, Quebec. He died in office in 1940.
