= Receiver General for Canada =

Canadian government position

- Receveur général du Canada
- Incumbent; Joël Lightbound since May 13, 2025
- Public Services and Procurement Canada
- Style: The Honourable
- Member of: Parliament; Privy Council; Cabinet
- Reports to: Parliament; Prime Minister
- Appointer: Monarch (represented by the governor general); on the advice of the prime minister
- Term length: At His Majesty's pleasure
- Inaugural holder: Walter Murray
- Formation: September 14, 1764
- Salary: CA$299,900 (2024)
- Website: www.tpsgc-pwgsc.gc.ca/recgen/

The receiver general for Canada (French: receveur général du Canada) is a government officeholder who is responsible for making payments to the Government of Canada each fiscal year, accepting payments from financial institutions and preparing the Public Accounts of Canada, containing annual audited financial statements of the Government of Canada. The receiver general deposits and withdraws funds from the Consolidated Revenue Fund of Canada.

By statute, the minister of government transformation, public services and procurement is the receiver general. The Department of Public Works and Government Services Act states: "In the Minister's capacity as Receiver General, the Minister shall exercise all the powers and perform all the duties and functions assigned to the receiver general by law."

== Receivers General ==
The first holder was Walter Murray, who was related to then Governor of Quebec James Murray from 1764. Murray was succeeded by Sir Thomas Mills from 1765 to 1777. Mills was often absent thus his office was held in acting by subordinates: Hector Theophilus Cramahe from 1766 to 1770 and Thomas Dunn from 1770 to 1777). Mills was returned to the post from 1777 until he was forced out in 1789 The office was replaced by the division of Quebec into Upper Canada and Lower Canada in 1791.

Pre-Confederation colonies of Lower Canada, New Brunswick, Nova Scotia, Prince Edward Island, Upper Canada and the Province of Canada each had this post.

From 1867 to 1879 it was a standalone position with minister of finance as ex officio. R.B. Bennett (1926, 1930–32) and Mackenzie Bowell (1896) are the only Prime Ministers to hold the title (Tupper held post before becoming a Prime Minister as Minister of Finance). From 1879 to 1968 it was held mainly by the minister of finance. Reverting as standalone in 1968 and transferred to the minister of supply and services in 1979. From 1980 to 1984 there was no cabinet title but under the authority of the minister of supply and services before reappearing in 1984. In 1996 the role was merged into the minister of public works with new title as minister of public works and government services and then as minister of public services and procurement since 2015.

List of receivers general since 1867:

- Edward Kenny 1867–1869, as Senator
- Jean-Charles Chapais 1869–1873, as Senator
- Théodore Robitaille 1873, as Senator
- Thomas Coffin 1873-1878
- John Mortimer Courtney 1878, as acting (Deputy RG and non MP)
- Alexander Campbell 1878–1879, as Senator
- Samuel Leonard Tilley 1879-1885
  - John Mortimer Courtney 1885 as acting (Deputy RG and non MP)
  - Archibald McLelan 1885-1887
  - Charles Tupper 1887-1888
  - George Eulas Foster 1888–1891, 1891-1896
- Mackenzie Bowell 1896
- John Mortimer Courtney 1896 as acting
- William Stevens Fielding 1896-1911
- William Thomas White 1911-1919
- Henry Lumley Drayton 1919-1920
- William Stevens Fielding 1921-1925
- James Robb 1925-1926
- Henry Lumley Drayton 1926 as acting
- Richard Bedford Bennett 1926
- James Robb 1926-1929
- John C. Saunders 1929
- Charles Avery Dunning 1929-1930
- Richard Bedford Bennett 1930-1932
- Edgar Nelson Rhodes 1932-1935
- Charles Avery Dunning 1935-1939
- James Ralston 1939-1940
- James Lorimer Ilsley 1940-1946
- Douglas Abbott 1946-1954
- Walter Edward Harris 1954-1957
- Donald Fleming 1957-1962
- George Nowlan 1962-1963
- Walter L. Gordon 1963-1965
- Mitchell Sharp 1965-1968
- Edgar Benson 1968-1969
- Don Jamieson 1969
- James Armstrong Richardson 1969-1972
- Jean-Pierre Goyer 1972-1978
- Pierre de Bané 1978-1979
- Roch La Salle 1979
- Charles Lapointe 1984
- Harvie Andre 1984-1985
- Stewart McInnes 1985-1986
- Monique Vézina 1986-1987
- Michel Côté 1987-1988
- Stewart McInnes 1988 as acting
- Lucien Bouchard 1988-1989
- Paul Dick 1989-1993
- David Dingwall 1993-1996
- Diane Marleau 1996-1997
- Alfonso Gagliano 1997-2002
- Don Boudria 2002
- Ralph Goodale 2002-2003
- Stephen Owen 2003-2004
- Scott Brison 2004-2006
- Michael Fortier 2006-2008
- Christian Paradis 2008-2010
- Rona Ambrose 2010-2013
- Diane Finley 2013-2015
- Judy Foote 2015-2017
- Carla Qualtrough 2017-2019
- Anita Anand 2019-2021
- Filomena Tassi 2021-2022
- Helena Jaczek 2022-2023
- Jean-Yves Duclos 2023-2025
- Ali Ehsassi 2025-2025
- Joël Lightbound 2025-

== See also ==
The position of receiver general existed in the United Kingdom and in various Commonwealth countries, and still exists in Massachusetts and provincially within Canada.
