= 1981 Canadian federal budget =

Allan MacEachen's second national spending plan as finance minister

1981 Budget of the Canadian Federal Government
- Presented: 12 November 1981
- Country: Canada
- Parliament: 32nd
- Party: Liberal
- Finance minister: Allan MacEachen
- Total revenue: 67.289 billion
- Total expenditures: 82.963 billion
- Deficit: $15.674 billion

The Canadian federal budget for fiscal year 1981–82 was presented by Minister of Finance Allan MacEachen in the House of Commons of Canada on 12 November 1981.
