= Doug Lewis (politician) =

Canadian politician

The Honourable Doug Lewis PC KC

Member of Parliament for Simcoe North
- In office 1979–1993
- Preceded by: Philip Bernard Rynard
- Succeeded by: Paul DeVillers

Personal details
- Born: April 17, 1938 (age 87)
- Occupation: accountant, lawyer and former politician

Douglas Grinslade Lewis, PC KC (born April 17, 1938) is a Canadian accountant, lawyer and former politician.

A chartered accountant and lawyer by training, Lewis entered the House of Commons of Canada when he won the seat of Simcoe North, Ontario, as a Progressive Conservative in the 1979 federal election. In the short-lived government of Prime Minister Joe Clark, he served as Parliamentary Secretary to the Minister of Supply and Services.

Re-elected in the 1980 federal election that returned the Liberals to power, Lewis moved to the opposition benches, serving first as Deputy House Leader from 1981 to February 1983, and then as Official Opposition House Leader until September 1983.

With the victory of the Progressive Conservatives under Brian Mulroney in the 1984 general election, Lewis again became a parliamentary secretary. In 1987, he entered the Cabinet as both Minister of State to the Government House Leader and Minister of State (Treasury Board). At the end of 1988, he became Acting President of the Treasury Board, and, a month later in January 1989, he was named Minister of Justice. He also served as Government House Leader from April 1989 to February 1990.

In April 1990, Lewis was moved from Justice to the position of Minister of Transport. In 1991, he was moved again, this time to the position of Solicitor General of Canada.

When Kim Campbell succeeded Mulroney as Progressive Conservative leader and prime minister in June 1993, she kept Lewis in Cabinet as Solicitor General, and also named him Government House Leader. Both Lewis and the Campbell government were defeated in the 1993 general election. Following his political defeat, he returned to his law practice in Orillia, Ontario.

Lewis remained a supporter of the Progressive Conservatives through the 1990s. However, in 2000, he supported Tom Long's candidacy to lead the new Canadian Alliance, which was an attempt to merge the PC Party with the Reform Party of Canada. In July 2000, however, he insisted to reporters that he was a loyal supporter of Joe Clark's renewed leadership of the Progressive Conservative party.

Lewis was elected as a Regional Bencher with the Law Society of Upper Canada in 2007.

Parliament of Canada
Preceded by P. B. Rynard	Member of Parliament for Simcoe North; 1979–1993	Succeeded by Paul DeVillers
Political offices
Preceded by Pat Carney	President of the Treasury Board; 1988–1989	Succeeded by Robert de Cotret
Preceded by Joe Clark	Minister of Justice; 1989–1990	Succeeded by Kim Campbell
Preceded by Benoît Bouchard	Minister of Transport; 1990–1991	Succeeded by Jean Corbeil
Preceded by Pierre Cadieux	Solicitor General of Canada; 1991–1993	Succeeded by Herb Gray
