= 1987 Canadian federal budget =

Michael Wilson and the Mulroney government's third national spending plan

1987 Budget of the Canadian Federal Government
- Presented: 18 February 1987
- Country: Canada
- Parliament: 33rd
- Party: Progressive Conservative
- Finance minister: Michael Wilson
- Total revenue: 97.215 billion
- Total expenditures: 126.232 billion
- Deficit: $29.017 billion

The Canadian federal budget for fiscal year 1987–88 was presented by Minister of Finance Michael Wilson in the House of Commons of Canada on 18 February 1987.

== Notes and References ==
=== References ===
==== Official documents ====
- Department of Finance (18 February 1987). Budget Papers: Securing Economic Renewal (PDF). Ottawa: Government of Canada.
- Department of Finance (18 February 1987). The Budget Speech (PDF). Ottawa: Government of Canada.
