= Pierre de Bané =

Canadian politician (1938–2019)

The Honourable Pierre De Bané PC QC
- بيير دي باين

Minister of Fisheries and Oceans
- In office September 30, 1982 – June 29, 1984
- Prime Minister: Pierre Trudeau
- Preceded by: Roméo LeBlanc
- Succeeded by: Herb Breau

Minister of Regional Economic Expansion
- In office March 3, 1980 – January 11, 1982
- Prime Minister: Pierre Trudeau
- Preceded by: Elmer MacKay
- Succeeded by: Herb Gray

Minister of Supply and Services
- In office November 24, 1978 – June 3, 1979
- Prime Minister: Pierre Trudeau
- Preceded by: Jean-Pierre Goyer
- Succeeded by: Roch LaSalle

Senator for De la Vallière, Quebec
- In office June 29, 1984 – August 2, 2013
- Nominated by: Pierre Trudeau
- Appointed by: Jeanne Sauvé
- Preceded by: Jean Marchand
- Succeeded by: Raymonde Saint-Germain

Member of Parliament for Matapédia—Matane
- In office May 22, 1979 – June 28, 1984
- Preceded by: Riding re-created
- Succeeded by: Jean-Luc Joncas

Member of Parliament for Matane
- In office June 25, 1968 – May 21, 1979
- Preceded by: Riding re-created
- Succeeded by: Riding dissolved

Personal details
- Born: August 2, 1938 Haifa, Mandatory Palestine
- Died: January 9, 2019 (aged 80) Ottawa, Ontario, Canada
- Party: Liberal
- Spouse: Elisabeth Nadeau (m. 1980)
- Children: 1
- Education: Université du Québec; Université Laval
- Profession: Lawyer

Pierre De Bané PC QC (Arabic: بيير دي باين; August 2, 1938 – January 9, 2019) was a Canadian politician who served in both the House of Commons of Canada and the Senate. Elected as the Member of Parliament for Matane in 1968, he was the first Palestinian, the first person of Middle Eastern descent, and the first visible minority person not born in Canada to be elected to the House of Commons of Canada. He was a member of the Canadian Cabinet during the Trudeau Sr. Ministry.

== Early life and education ==
De Bané was born in Haifa, Palestine. His family then immigrated to Canada in 1947 to escape the looming war, and settled in Quebec. De Bané studied at Séminaire Saint-Joseph de Trois-Rivières, Collège Saint-Alexandre, University of Quebec and from law at Laval University.

== Political career ==
He was first elected to the House of Commons of Canada in the 1968 general election, and served as a Member of Parliament for sixteen years.

In 1978, Prime Minister Pierre Trudeau appointed De Bané to the Canadian Cabinet as the Minister of Supply and Services. He joined the opposition bench when the Liberals lost the 1979 election, but was reappointed to the Cabinet as the Minister of Regional Economic Expansion when the Liberals returned to power in 1980 election.

In 1982, De Bané became Minister of State for External Relations and, eight months later, he became the Minister of Fisheries and Oceans. De Bané was named to the Senate by Trudeau.

De Bané was active on numerous Senate committees, particularly those dealing with fisheries, foreign affairs, and legal affairs and was also active in public life on the issue of Palestinian refugees.

He retired from the Senate upon turning 75 on August 2, 2013, and died on January 9, 2019, at the age of 80.

== Archives ==
There is a Pierre de Bané fonds at Library and Archives Canada.
