= Minister of International Trade =

Canadian federal Cabinet position

- Ministre du Commerce international
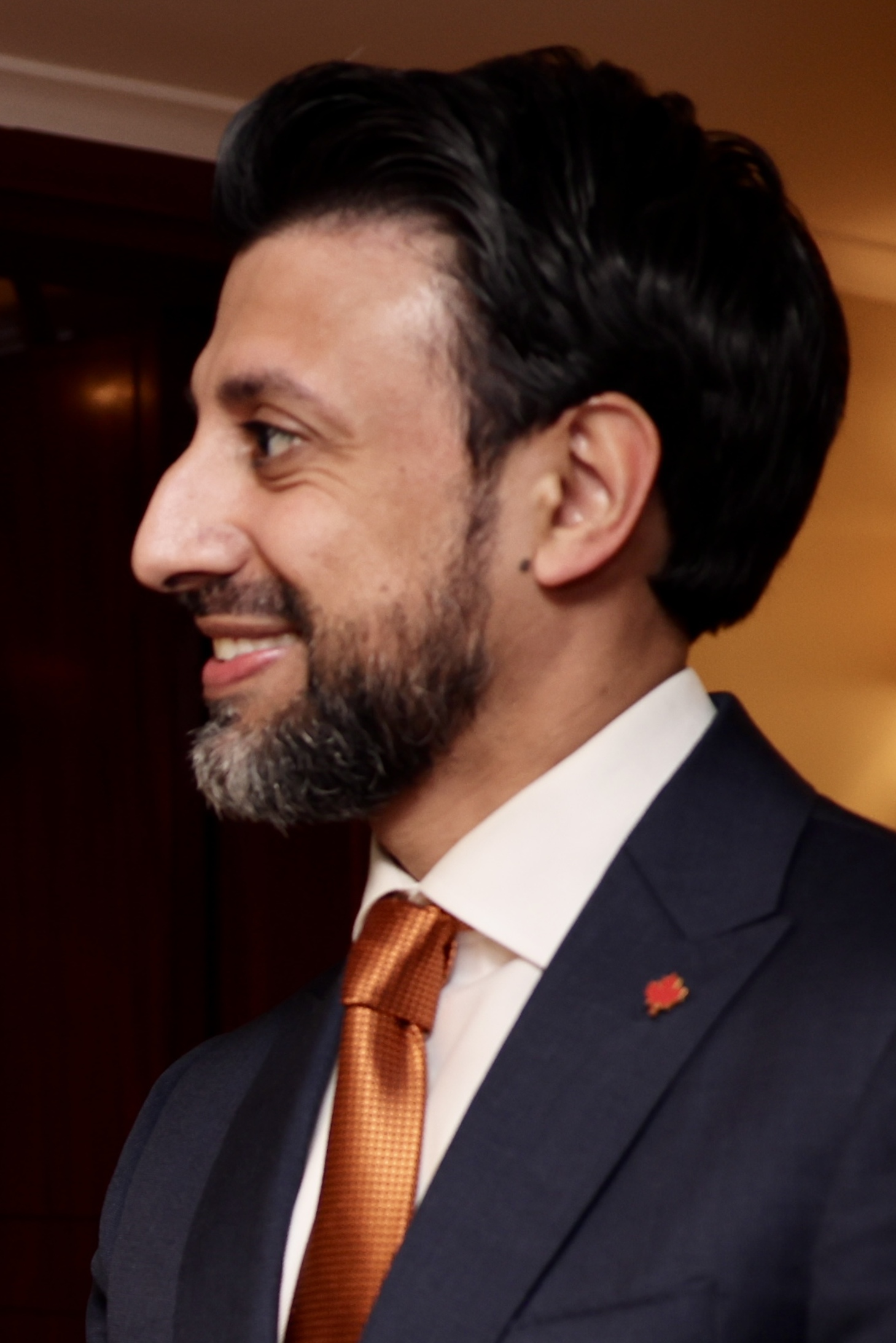
- Incumbent; Maninder Sidhu since May 13, 2025
- Global Affairs Canada
- Style: The Honourable
- Member of: House of Commons; Privy Council; Cabinet
- Reports to: Parliament; Prime Minister
- Appointer: Monarch (represented by the governor general); on the advice of the prime minister
- Term length: At His Majesty's pleasure
- Inaugural holder: Gerald Regan
- Formation: 8 December 1983
- Salary: CA$299,900 (2024)
- Website: www.international.gc.ca

The minister of international trade (French: ministre du commerce international) is the minister of the Crown in the Canadian Cabinet responsible for the federal government's international trade portfolio. Along with the Minister of Foreign Affairs, it is one of two ministers associated with Global Affairs Canada.

Maninder Sidhu has served as the minister of international trade since 2025.

== History ==
The post was first established in 1983 as the Minister for International Trade by the Government Organization Act, 1983, which re-organized various governmental functions and updated the Department of External Affairs Act. The lead responsibility for international trade was reassigned from the Department of Industry to the Department of External Affairs, and the position was created to assist the senior departmental minister, the Secretary of State for External Affairs at the time, in carrying out their responsibilities relating to international trade. Gerald Regan, then the Minister of State (International Trade), was appointed to be the first office holder.

While the name of the department and the title of the senior departmental minister changed numerous times, this formal title remains unchanged. However the minister has been styled differently since 2006.

Starting in 2006, the minister has been styled with a variety of titles. When Conservative Prime Minister Stephen Harper formed his first government on February 6, 2006, he appointed David Emerson, who was re-elected days earlier as a Liberal candidate, to the office styled Minister of International Trade (along with Minister for the Pacific Gateway and the Vancouver-Whistler Olympics). Subsequent ministers were styled as Minister of International Trade until 2018, when the position was renamed Minister of International Trade Diversification.

In 2019, the portfolio was merged with Small Business and Export Promotion and renamed Minister of Small Business, Export Promotion and International Trade. In 2021, the role gained additional responsibility for economic development, being renamed Minister of International Trade, Export Promotion, Small Business and Economic Development. In 2023, the role lost responsibility for small business to the Minister of Small Business, at which point it was renamed Minister of Export Promotion, International Trade and Economic Development, a title it had until 2025, when it lost responsibility for economic development.

== Ministers ==
Key:

Liberal Party of Canada
Progressive Conservative
Conservative Party of Canada

No.	Portrait	Name	Term of office		Political party	Ministry
Minister for International Trade
1		Gerald Regan	December 8, 1983	June 29, 1984	Liberal	22 (P. E. Trudeau)
2		Francis Fox	June 30, 1984	September 16, 1984	Liberal	23 (Turner)
3		James F. Kelleher	September 17, 1984	June 29, 1986	Progressive Conservative	24 (Mulroney)
4		Pat Carney	June 30, 1986	March 30, 1988	Progressive Conservative	24 (Mulroney)
5		John Crosbie	March 31, 1988	April 20, 1991	Progressive Conservative	24 (Mulroney)
6		Michael Wilson	April 21, 1991	June 24, 1993	Progressive Conservative	24 (Mulroney)
7		Tom Hockin	June 25, 1993	November 3, 1993	Progressive Conservative	25 (Campbell)
8		Roy MacLaren	November 4, 1993	January 24, 1996	Liberal	26 (Chrétien)
9		Art Eggleton	January 25, 1996	June 10, 1997	Liberal	26 (Chrétien)
10		Sergio Marchi	June 11, 1997	August 2, 1999	Liberal	26 (Chrétien)
11		Pierre Pettigrew	August 3, 1999	December 11, 2003	Liberal	26 (Chrétien)
12		Jim Peterson	December 12, 2003	February 5, 2006	Liberal	27 (Martin)
Minister of International Trade
13		David Emerson	February 6, 2006	June 24, 2008	Conservative	28 (Harper)
14		Michael Fortier	June 25, 2008	October 29, 2008	Conservative	28 (Harper)
15		Stockwell Day	October 30, 2008	January 19, 2010	Conservative	28 (Harper)
16		Peter Van Loan	January 19, 2010	May 18, 2011	Conservative	28 (Harper)
17		Ed Fast	May 18, 2011	November 4, 2015	Conservative	28 (Harper)
18		Chrystia Freeland	November 4, 2015	January 10, 2017	Liberal	29 (J. Trudeau)
19		François-Philippe Champagne	January 10, 2017	July 18, 2018	Liberal	29 (J. Trudeau)
Minister of International Trade Diversification
20		Jim Carr	July 18, 2018	November 20, 2019	Liberal	29 (J. Trudeau)
Minister of Small Business, Export Promotion and International Trade
21		Mary Ng	November 20, 2019	October 26, 2021	Liberal	29 (J. Trudeau)
Minister of International Trade, Export Promotion, Small Business and Economic Development
(21)		Mary Ng	October 26, 2021	July 26, 2023	Liberal	29 (J. Trudeau)
Minister of Export Promotion, International Trade and Economic Development
(21)		Mary Ng	July 26, 2023	March 14, 2025	Liberal	29 (J. Trudeau)
Minister of International Trade and Intergovernmental Affairs
22		Dominic LeBlanc	March 14, 2025	May 13, 2025	Liberal	30 (Carney)
Minister of International Trade
23		Maninder Sidhu	May 13, 2025	Incumbent	Liberal	30 (Carney)
