= Michel Côté (MP) =

Canadian politician

The Honourable Michel Côté PC

Member of Parliament for Langelier
- In office 4 September 1984 – 1 October 1988
- Preceded by: Gilles Lamontagne
- Succeeded by: Gilles Loiselle

Personal details
- Born: 13 September 1942 (age 83) Quebec City, Quebec
- Party: Progressive Conservative
- Profession: accountant, businessman

Michel Côté (born 13 September 1942) is a Canadian businessman and former politician.

Côté, an accountant and part-owner of the Quebec Remparts junior hockey team prior to entering elected politics, was elected to the House of Commons of Canada in the 1984 Canadian federal election. He represented the electoral district of Langelier as a member of the Progressive Conservative Party of Canada.

== Minister of Consumer and Corporate Affairs ==
He was appointed to the cabinet of prime minister Brian Mulroney as Minister of Consumer and Corporate Affairs. In 1985 he announced a compromise on the still controversial process of metrication in Canada, retaining mandatory metrication in most domains but permitting small retailers to continue using the Imperial measurement system if they had not already finished investing in metric conversion.

Early in his term, he announced that the government was planning reforms to Canadian combines and patent legislation relating to pharmaceutical drugs; he introduced revisions to the Combines Investigation Act in December 1985. Although he oversaw the departmental review of the Patent Act, the government's proposed reforms to drug patents were not introduced to Parliament until after Côté was succeeded by Harvie André in 1986. His reforms to competition legislation included a significant increase to the fines the government could charge in cases of price fixing.

In 1985, he faced some criticism when the government increased its fees for trademark registration to cover the costs of computerizing the process. In July of that year, he represented the government of Canada at the inauguration of Alan García as President of Peru, although the government later faced criticism for the cost of his trip.

In August, he was given the additional title of Minister responsible for Canada Post Corporation.

Late in 1985, he promised to work with agriculture minister John Wise to introduce new provisions to help farmers facing bankruptcy, and proposed reforms to federal lobbying regulation, which would have required lobbyists to disclose fees and clients to the government but did not include provisions for this information to be available to the public.

== Minister of Regional Industrial Expansion ==
In July 1986, Côté was shuffled from Consumer and Social Services to Minister of Regional Industrial Expansion, although he retained the Canada Post role. His change of duties was part of what was billed as Mulroney's "French power" cabinet, in which ministers from Quebec held many of the most powerful roles; however, Côté's political and communication skills began to face some criticism at this time, with Robert McKenzie of the Toronto Star writing that Côté "still looks petrified on TV, glancing continually sideways as if seeking the nearest exit."

In this role, he supported the 1986 bid by Marine Industries to take over Davie Shipbuilding.

In summer 1987, the government announced a major reform of DRIE, converting it from a standalone ministry to a group of regionally-targeted government agencies, such as the Atlantic Canada Opportunities Agency, the Federal Economic Development Initiative for Northern Ontario and Western Economic Diversification Canada, under the auspices of an expanded Ministry of Industry, Trade and Commerce. On 28 August, an external audit into the ministry was released, which found that it was significantly overspending its budget; the report did not blame Côté, who had in fact commissioned the audit himself to independently review irregularities he had personally identified, but stated that the problems of bureaucratic mismanagement and poor financial record keeping significantly predated his time as minister.

== Minister of Supply and Services ==
Although the audit held that Côté was not responsible for the departmental mismanagement, Mulroney shuffled him later the same day from Regional Industrial Expansion to Minister of Supply and Services. Although the opposition New Democratic Party argued in the House of Commons that Côté should be fired from cabinet in light of the report, the criticism died down within a few days.

He held the role until 2 February 1988, when he was dropped from cabinet after violating conflict of interest rules by failing to disclose that he had received a $250,000 personal loan from a government contractor. Following his ouster from cabinet, it was revealed that he had also steered $400,000 in government legal work to his former campaign manager.

He did not run for reelection in the 1988 Canadian federal election.
