= Erik Nielsen =

Canadian politician (1924–2008)

The Honourable Erik Nielsen PC DFC QC
- Official 1984 portrait

3rd Deputy Prime Minister of Canada
- In office September 17, 1984 – June 30, 1986
- Prime Minister: Brian Mulroney
- Preceded by: Jean Chrétien
- Succeeded by: Don Mazankowski

Leader of the Opposition
- In office February 2, 1983 – August 28, 1983
- Monarch: Elizabeth II
- Prime Minister: Pierre Trudeau
- Preceded by: Joe Clark
- Succeeded by: Brian Mulroney

Interim Leader of the Progressive Conservative Party
- In office February 19, 1983 – June 11, 1983
- Preceded by: Joe Clark
- Succeeded by: Brian Mulroney

Minister of National Defence
- In office February 27, 1985 – June 29, 1986
- Prime Minister: Brian Mulroney
- Preceded by: Robert Coates
- Succeeded by: Perrin Beatty

President of the Privy Council
- In office September 17, 1984 – February 26, 1985
- Prime Minister: Brian Mulroney
- Preceded by: André Ouellet
- Succeeded by: Ray Hnatyshyn

Minister of Public Works
- In office June 4, 1979 – March 2, 1980
- Prime Minister: Joe Clark
- Preceded by: André Ouellet
- Succeeded by: Paul Cosgrove

Member of Parliament for Yukon
- In office December 16, 1957 – January 16, 1987
- Preceded by: James Aubrey Simmons
- Succeeded by: Audrey McLaughlin

Personal details
- Born: February 24, 1924 Regina, Saskatchewan, Canada
- Died: September 4, 2008 (aged 84) Kelowna, British Columbia, Canada
- Party: Progressive Conservative
- Spouse(s): Pamela June Nielsen (–1969) Shelley Nielsen (m. 1983)
- Relatives: Leslie Nielsen (brother); Jean Hersholt (half-uncle)
- Profession: Politician; barrister; attorney
- Awards: Distinguished Flying Cross

Military service
- Allegiance: Canada
- Branch/service: RCAF
- Years of service: 1942–1945; 1946–1951
- Rank: Lieutenant
- Unit: No. 101 Squadron RAF
- Battles/wars: Second World War: Operation Overlord

Erik Hersholt Nielsen PC DFC QC (February 24, 1924 – September 4, 2008) was a Canadian lawyer and politician. He served as the longtime Progressive Conservative Member of Parliament for Yukon, and was Leader of the Opposition and the third deputy prime minister of Canada. He was the elder brother of actor Leslie Nielsen.

== Early life, family, and education ==
Nielsen was born in Regina, Saskatchewan, the eldest of three boys. His mother, Mabel Elizabeth (née Davies), was an immigrant from Wales, and his father, Ingvard Eversen Nielsen, was a Danish-born constable in the Royal Canadian Mounted Police. Nielsen's family lived mainly in Alberta during his formative years, as well as in Fort Norman where his father was posted, and he graduated from high school in Edmonton in 1942.

== World War II ==
Nielsen joined the Royal Canadian Air Force in 1942, just after graduation, and received his training mainly in Alberta. He flew 33 missions in No. 101 Squadron RAF in World War II, and was awarded the Distinguished Flying Cross for "courage and devotion to duty". He earned the rank of flight lieutenant. He rejoined the RCAF, 1946–1951, as a legal officer, while earning a law degree at Dalhousie University. He established his law practice in Whitehorse, Yukon.

== Parliament ==
Nielsen was elected to parliament in late 1957 (Nielsen lost in the 1957 federal election, but the result was controverted and Nielsen won the resulting byelection) and remained an MP without interruption for 30 years. He was a backbench MP during the Diefenbaker government but became prominent during the Conservative Party's long period in Opposition during the 1960s and 1970s joining the shadow cabinet in 1964. In 1978, he ran for the leadership of the newly formed Yukon Progressive Conservative Party as it prepared for the territory's first partisan elections but was defeated by Hilda Watson by one vote.

With the 1979 federal election, the Tories formed government for the first time in over 15 years and Nielsen was appointed Minister of Public Works in the short-lived minority government of Prime Minister Joe Clark. After the Tories were defeated in the 1980 election, he served as Opposition House Leader from 1981 until 1983, and engineered the "Bell Ringing Affair" to protest the Liberal government's omnibus energy bill. The business of the House of Commons of Canada ground to a halt for three weeks because the Opposition refused to respond to the bell summoning Members of Parliament to come to the chamber to vote.

Nielsen served as Leader of the Opposition in 1983 between the resignation of Joe Clark and the election of Brian Mulroney as PC leader, and continued to lead the party in the House until Mulroney won a seat in a by-election, at which point Nielsen returned to his previous position as House Leader.

When Mulroney became prime minister, he made Nielsen his deputy prime minister from 1984 to 1986, and President of the Queen's Privy Council for Canada from 1984 to 1985. Nielsen was effectively the senior Government House Leader in all but name. He also served as Minister of National Defence from 1985 to 1986.

Nielsen was sometimes called "Yukon Erik", (a reference to wrestler Yukon Eric of the 1950s) but he was also called "Velcro lips" for a tight-lipped reticence during his time in office. The tenaciousness and aggressiveness that made Nielsen a successful Opposition MP made him a liability as a Cabinet minister as he gave the impression of being secretive and disdainful of criticism by the Opposition and the media. His habit of stonewalling questions had the effect of prolonging the shelf life of political scandals in Parliament, and thus hurt the government's reputation. This became most apparent during the Sinclair Stevens conflict-of-interest scandal, in which Mulroney was out of Parliament for two weeks while the opposition barraged Nielsen with questions. Shortly after Mulroney returned in June 1986, he forced both Nielsen and Stevens to resign from cabinet. Around this time, reports emerged in the press that Nielsen had engaged in illegal wiretapping of Liberal MPs in the 1960s. While Nielsen strongly denied the allegations, at Mulroney's insistence he ultimately gave a public apology for them.

Nielsen resigned his seat in Parliament in January 1987 when he was given the position of chairman of the National Transportation Agency; though at the time his resignation was widely believed to be a direct result of the Stevens and wiretapping scandals, others close to Nielsen have claimed that he always intended to retire to the private sector before the next scheduled federal election. In any event, the Progressive Conservatives lost Nielsen's seat to future New Democratic Party leader Audrey McLaughlin in the ensuing by-election. Nielsen withdrew from the public service in 1992 to become president of Solar Engineering, Hawaii Inc. and Solar Electric Engineering Distributors Canada.

One of Nielsen's brothers was actor Leslie Nielsen. The relationship formed the premise of an HBO mockumentary titled The Canadian Conspiracy, comically alleging a Canadian subversion of the United States through its media. Nielsen was also a nephew of actor Jean Hersholt.

Nielsen wrote a memoir, The House Is Not a Home (1989, ISBN 0-7715-9426-7), noted for its bracing directness both about his colleagues and about his own personal life.

He died at his home in Kelowna, British Columbia on September 4, 2008, from a massive heart attack. On December 15, the government of Yukon renamed the main airport at Whitehorse, the capital of the territory, to Erik Nielsen Whitehorse International Airport in Nielsen's memory.

Political offices
Preceded by Joe Clark	Leader of the Opposition; 1983	Succeeded by Brian Mulroney
Preceded by Jean Chrétien	Deputy Prime Minister of Canada; 1984–1986	Succeeded by Don Mazankowski
Party political offices
Preceded by Joe Clark	Leader of the Progressive Conservative Party; Interim; 1983	Succeeded by Brian Mulroney
