= Minister responsible for Canada Post Corporation =

The Minister responsible for Canada Post Corporation is a member of the Canadian Cabinet responsible for Canada Post Corporation, the federal Crown corporation responsible for Canada's postal service. The position was created in 1981 assuming some of the responsibilities previously exercised by the Postmaster General of Canada.

From 1996 until 2006, the position has been held by the Minister of Public Works and Government Services and from 2006 to 2015 by the Minister of Transport. Since 2015, the Minister of Public Services and Procurement has also been the Minister responsible for Canada Post.
