= Minister of Regional Industrial Expansion =

Minister of Regional Economic Expansion was an office in the Cabinet of Canada from 1969 to 1990. On February 23, 1990 the position was merged into that of Minister of Industry, Science and Technology.

== Ministers ==
| Jean Marchand | under Trudeau | April 1, 1969 – November 26, 1972 |
| Donald Campbell Jamieson | under Trudeau | November 27, 1972 – September 25, 1975 |
| Marcel Lessard | under Trudeau | September 26, 1975 – June 3, 1979 |
| Elmer MacKay | under Joe Clark | June 4, 1979 – March 2, 1980 |
| Pierre De Bané | under Trudeau | March 3, 1980 – January 11, 1982 |
| Herb Gray | under Trudeau | January 12, 1982 – September 29, 1982 |
| Ed Lumley | under Trudeau | September 30, 1982 – December 6, 1982 |

On December 7, 1982 the position was renamed Canadian Minister of Regional Industrial Expansion. The Department of Regional Industrial Expansion (DRIE) was created when Industry, Trade and Commerce was combined with the Department of Regional Economic Expansion (DREE).

| Ed Lumley | under Trudeau | December 7, 1982 – September 16, 1984 |
| Sinclair Stevens | under Mulroney | September 17, 1984 – May 12, 1986 |
| Don Mazankowski (acting) | under Mulroney | May 13, 1986 – June 29, 1986 |
| Michel Côté | under Mulroney | June 30, 1986 – August 26, 1987 |
| Robert de Cotret | under Mulroney | August 27, 1987 – January 29, 1989 |
| Harvie André | under Mulroney | January 30, 1989 – February 22, 1990 |
