= Solicitor General of Canada =

Political position

The Solicitor General of Canada (French: solliciteur général du Canada) was a position in the Canadian ministry from 1892 to 2005. The position was based on the Solicitor General in the British system and was originally designated as an officer to assist the Attorney General and Minister of Justice. It was not initially a position in the Canadian Cabinet, although after 1917 its occupant was often sworn into the Queen's Privy Council for Canada and attended Cabinet meetings. In 1966, the modern position of Solicitor General was created with the repeal of the previous Solicitor General Act and the passage of a new statute creating the ministerial office of the Solicitor General of Canada.

In recent decades the Solicitor General's department was responsible for administering the prison system, the Royal Canadian Mounted Police, the National Parole Board and other matters relating to internal security. In 2003, the position was styled Minister of Public Safety and Emergency Preparedness, and the portfolio expanded. In 2005, the position of Solicitor General was formally abolished by Prime Minister Paul Martin and his deputy Anne McLellan.

== Solicitors General ==
Name	Prime Minister	Tenure
John Joseph Curran*	Thompson	December 5, 1892 – December 12, 1894
John Joseph Curran*	Mackenzie Bowell	December 21, 1894 – October 17, 1895
vacant	Mackenzie Bowell	October 18, 1895 – April 27, 1896
Sir Charles Hibbert Tupper	Charles Tupper	May 1 – July 8, 1896
Charles Fitzpatrick*	Wilfrid Laurier	July 13, 1896 – February 9, 1902
Henry George Carroll*	Wilfrid Laurier	February 10, 1902 – January 28, 1904
Rodolphe Lemieux*	Wilfrid Laurier	January 29, 1904 – June 3, 1906
vacant	Wilfrid Laurier	June 4, 1906 – February 13, 1907
Jacques Bureau*	Wilfrid Laurier	February 14, 1907 – October 6, 1911
vacant	Robert Borden	October 10, 1911 – June 25, 1913
Arthur Meighen*	Robert Borden	June 26, 1913 – October 1, 1915
Arthur Meighen*	Robert Borden	October 2, 1915 – August 24, 1917
Arthur Meighen* (acting)	Robert Borden	August 31 – October 3, 1917
Hugh Guthrie*	Robert Borden	October 4, 1917 – July 4, 1919
Hugh Guthrie*	Robert Borden	July 5, 1919 – July 10, 1920
Hugh Guthrie* (acting)	Arthur Meighen	July 10, 1920 – September 30, 1921
Guillaume-André Fauteux	Arthur Meighen	October 1, 1921 - December 28, 1921
Daniel Duncan McKenzie	William Lyon Mackenzie King	December 29, 1921 – April 10, 1923
vacant	William Lyon Mackenzie King	April 11 – November 13, 1923
Edward James McMurray	William Lyon Mackenzie King	November 14, 1923 – May 22, 1925
vacant	William Lyon Mackenzie King	May 23 – September 4, 1925
Lucien Cannon*	William Lyon Mackenzie King	September 5, 1925 – June 28, 1926
vacant	Arthur Meighen	June 29 – August 22, 1926
Guillaume André Fauteux	Arthur Meighen	August 23 – September 25, 1926
Lucien Cannon (second time)	William Lyon Mackenzie King	September 25, 1926 – August 7, 1930
Maurice Dupré	R.B. Bennett	August 8, 1930 – October 23, 1935
vacant	William Lyon Mackenzie King	October 25, 1935 – April 17, 1945
Joseph Jean	William Lyon Mackenzie King	April 18, 1945 – November 15, 1948
Joseph Jean	Louis St. Laurent	November 15, 1948 – August 23, 1949
Hugues Lapointe	Louis St. Laurent	August 25, 1949 – August 6, 1950
Stuart Sinclair Garson	Louis St. Laurent	August 7, 1950 – October 14, 1952
Ralph Osborne Campney	Louis St. Laurent	October 15, 1952 – January 11, 1954
William Ross Macdonald	Louis St. Laurent	January 12, 1954 – June 21, 1957
Léon Balcer	John Diefenbaker	June 21, 1957 – October 10, 1960
William Joseph Browne	John Diefenbaker	October 11, 1957 – August 9, 1962
vacant	John Diefenbaker	August 10, 1962 – April 22, 1963
John Watson MacNaught	Lester Pearson	April 22, 1963 – July 6, 1965
Lawrence Pennell	Lester Pearson	July 7, 1965 – April 20, 1968
John Turner	Pierre Trudeau	April 20 – July 5, 1968
George James McIlraith	Pierre Trudeau	July 6, 1968 – December 21, 1970
Jean-Pierre Goyer	Pierre Trudeau	December 22, 1970 – November 26, 1972
Warren Allmand	Pierre Trudeau	November 27, 1972 – September 13, 1976
Francis Fox	Pierre Trudeau	September 14, 1976 – January 27, 1978
Ron Basford (acting)	Pierre Trudeau	January 28 – February 1, 1978
Jean-Jacques Blais	Pierre Trudeau	February 2, 1978 – June 3, 1979
Allan Frederick Lawrence	Joe Clark	June 4, 1979 – March 2, 1980
Robert Phillip Kaplan	Pierre Trudeau	March 3, 1980 – June 29, 1984
Robert Phillip Kaplan	John Turner	June 30 – September 16, 1984
Elmer MacKay	Brian Mulroney	September 17, 1984 – August 19, 1985
Perrin Beatty	Brian Mulroney	August 20, 1985 – June 29, 1986
James Kelleher	Brian Mulroney	June 30, 1986 – December 7, 1988
Perrin Beatty* (acting)	Brian Mulroney	December 8, 1988 – January 29, 1989
Pierre Blais	Brian Mulroney	January 30, 1989 – February 22, 1990
Pierre Cadieux	Brian Mulroney	February 23, 1990 – April 20, 1991
Doug Lewis	Brian Mulroney	April 21, 1991 – January 3, 1993
Doug Lewis	Kim Campbell	June 24 – November 3, 1993
Herb Gray	Jean Chrétien	November 4, 1993 – June 10, 1997
Andy Scott	Jean Chrétien	June 11, 1997 – November 23, 1998
Lawrence MacAulay	Jean Chrétien	November 23, 1998 – October 22, 2002
Wayne Easter	Jean Chrétien	October 22, 2002 – December 11, 2003
Anne McLellan as Minister of Public Safety and Emergency Preparedness	Paul Martin	December 12, 2003 – March 23, 2005

(*) Not in Cabinet
