= Harvie Andre =

Canadian politician

The Honourable Harvie Andre PC
- Official 1988 portrait

Member of Parliament for Calgary Centre
- In office 1972–1993
- Constituency: Calgary Centre

Government House Leader
- In office 1990–1993
- Prime Minister: Brian Mulroney

Minister of Regional Industrial Expansion
- In office 1989–1990
- Prime Minister: Brian Mulroney

Minister of Consumer and Corporate Affairs
- In office 1986–1989
- Prime Minister: Brian Mulroney

Associate Minister of National Defence
- In office 1985–1986
- Prime Minister: Brian Mulroney

Minister of Supply and Services
- In office 1984–1985
- Prime Minister: Brian Mulroney

Personal details
- Born: July 27, 1940 Edmonton, Alberta, Canada
- Died: October 21, 2012 (aged 72)
- Party: Progressive Conservative
- Education: University of Alberta, California Institute of Technology
- Alma mater: University of Alberta
- Occupation: Engineer, businessman, politician, federal Cabinet minister, professor of chemical engineering

Harvie Andre, PC (July 27, 1940 – October 21, 2012) was a Canadian engineer, businessman, politician and federal Cabinet minister.

Born in Edmonton, Alberta, Andre was educated at the University of Alberta (’62, PhD ’66) and pursued part of his postgraduate studies at the California Institute of Technology before becoming a professor of chemical engineering at the University of Calgary from 1966 to 1972. In the 1972 general election he won a seat in the House of Commons of Canada, where he served as the Progressive Conservative Member of Parliament (MP) for Calgary Centre for twenty-one years.

In opposition, Andre was a vocal opponent of Petro-Canada and the National Energy Program. He also served as the defence critic.

He was appointed to the Cabinet after the 1984 election brought the Tories to power under Brian Mulroney. Andre served as Minister of Supply and Services until 1985 when he became Associate Minister of National Defence. From 1986 to 1989, he was Minister of Consumer and Corporate Affairs and then Minister of Regional Industrial Expansion until 1990. In addition, in 1987 Mulroney gave Andre responsibility for Canada Post Corporation.

For the last three years of the Mulroney government, Andre was Government House Leader. He did not run for re-election in the 1993 federal election, and returned to private life.

After leaving politics, Andre was involved in the business world, particularly the energy sector, as president of Cresvard Corporation since 1998, chief executive of Calgary-based Wenzel Downhole Tools and chairman of BowEnergy Resources since 2001. He served on numerous corporate boards of directors.

Andre was married, and had two daughters and one son.

Parliament of Canada
Preceded by Douglas Harkness	Member of Parliament Calgary Centre; 1972–1993	Succeeded by Jim Silye
