= Minister of Supply and Services =

20th-century governmental position in Cabinet of Canada

Minister of Supply and Services was an office in the Cabinet of Canada from 1969 to 1996. On July 12, 1996, office of the Minister of Supply and Services and the office of the Minister of Public Works were abolished and replaced with the office of Minister of Public Works and Government Services.

== Ministers ==
1.	Donald Campbell Jamieson	under Trudeau	April 1, 1969 – May 4, 1969
2.	James Armstrong Richardson	under Trudeau	May 5, 1969 – November 26, 1972
3.	Jean-Pierre Goyer	under Trudeau	November 27, 1972 – November 23, 1978
4.	Pierre De Bané	under Trudeau	November 24, 1978 – June 3, 1979
5.	Roch LaSalle	under Clark	June 4, 1979 – March 2, 1980
7.	Jean-Jacques Blais	under Trudeau	March 3, 1980 – August 11, 1983
8.	Charles Lapointe	under Trudeau	August 12, 1983 – June 29, 1984
8.	Charles Lapointe	under Turner	June 30, 1984 – September 16, 1984
9.	Harvie Andre	under Mulroney	September 17, 1984 – August 19, 1985
10.	Stewart McInnes	under Mulroney	August 20, 1985 – June 29, 1986
	Marcel Masse (second time)	under Mulroney	November 30, 1985 – June 29, 1986
11.	Monique Vézina	under Mulroney	June 30, 1986 – December 7, 1988
*	Lowell Murray (acting)	under Mulroney	December 8, 1988 – August 26, 1987
12.	Michel Côté	under Mulroney	August 27, 1987 – February 2, 1988
*	Stewart McInnes (acting)	under Mulroney	February 3, 1988 – March 30, 1988
13.	Otto John Jelinek	under Mulroney	March 31, 1988 – January 29, 1989
14.	Paul Wyatt Dick	under Mulroney	January 30, 1989 – June 24, 1993
14.	Paul Wyatt Dick	under Campbell	June 25, 1993 – November 3, 1993
15.	David Charles Dingwall	under Chrétien	November 4, 1993 – January 24, 1996
16.	Diane Marleau	under Chrétien	January 25, 1996 – July 11, 1996

== Small Arms Division 1946-1974 ==
The successor to Small Arms Limited, Long Branch Arsenal, Small Arms Division, Canadian Arsenal Limited, was a Crown Corporation charged with creating small arms for the Canadian military.
