= Minister of state (Canada) =

Junior federal cabinet minister position

A minister of state is a junior cabinet minister in the Cabinet of Canada, usually given specific responsibilities to assist a senior cabinet minister in a specific area. A secretary of state also holds many similar responsibilities in assisting senior cabinet members, being members of the Ministry and the King's Privy Council for Canada. A secretary of state is legally a minister of state styled as secretaries. However, secretaries of state are considered junior to ministers of state and are not members of Cabinet.

== History ==
The title "Minister of State" was created during the government of Pierre Trudeau in 1971 under the Ministries and Ministers of State Act. This act allows for the creation of two different types of ministers of state. Sections 2 through 10 allow for the creation of a ministry of state, which is a temporary government department established by separating parts of departments created by law. A minister of state can be the head of such a ministry. Sections 11 and 12 of the act allow for the creation of a minister of state who "may be assigned by the Governor in Council to assist any minister or ministers having responsibilities for any department or other portion of the public service of Canada in the carrying out of those responsibilities". The latter has become far more common and, by and large, the former has fallen into disuse.

Under Brian Mulroney and his successors, the title of Minister of State without any responsibilities attached has been used to appoint what had previously been called ministers without portfolio. Ministers of State are also members of the King's Privy Council for Canada, as is required for them to be a part of the ministry.

During the government of Jean Chrétien, assistants to senior cabinet ministers were often styled as secretary of state, considered junior to ministers of state, and were not members of Cabinet. Under Chrétien, the title "minister of state", with a specific policy responsibility, was usually given to either a Cabinet minister, in addition to his or her other responsibilities, or to the deputy prime minister, government house leader or leader of the government in the Senate. Chrétien also had parliamentary secretaries, ranking below secretaries of state, who were set to two-year terms and the post was used as a reward for weary backbenchers. Their duty was to answer questions and table reports on behalf of ministers when they were unable to be present in the house.

Paul Martin eliminated the position of secretary of state and reverted to using the title "minister of state" for junior cabinet ministers. The day he took office, Martin realigned various government departments. However, this can be done by changing the law only so, in reality, he set up various ministries of state headed by ministers of state. All such ministries of state and their ministers were styled as proper ministers of permanent departments. Over the course of his government, most of these departments were created in law and the ministers of state became ministers of the new departments as their empowering legislation received royal assent.

When Stephen Harper became Prime Minister on February 6, 2006, he did not include any ministers of state in his cabinet. Derek Burney, the head of Harper's transition team, noted to the press that this was intentional: ministers of state and the role of Deputy Prime Minister were omitted to create a cabinet of full equals. In actuality, Harper did appoint a number of ministers of state in order to give certain ministers responsibilities outside of their portfolios; however, all of these ministers of state were also full Cabinet ministers and their formal titles were styled so as to omit "of state". On January 4, 2007, Harper added five secretaries of state to his ministry thus reviving the practice of appointing junior ministers outside of the Cabinet. On October 30, 2008, Harper added 11 ministers of state to his Cabinet. On January 4, 2011, Harper added one minister of state to his Cabinet to a total of 12. In 2015, the 29th cabinet led by Justin Trudeau, formed and updated several ministries including the formation of Minister of Sport and Persons with Disabilities from the previous junior position Minister of State (Sport). In the 29th Canadian Ministry, there were no ministers of state.

== Ministers of State ==
=== Agriculture ===
The Minister of State (Agriculture) (French: Ministre d'État (Agriculture)) was a junior minister in the Canadian Cabinet responsible for the Rural Secretariat and the Cooperatives Secretariat, reporting to the Minister of Agriculture. As of January 2016, the position has not been a part of the Cabinet of Justin Trudeau.

Name	Took office	Left office	Party
Pierre Blais	August 27, 1987	June 24, 1993	Progressive Conservative Party
Christian Paradis	January 4, 2007	June 24, 2008	Conservative Party of Canada
Jean-Pierre Blackburn	October 30, 2008	May 17, 2011	Conservative Party of Canada
Christian Paradis	May 18, 2011	July 14, 2013	Conservative Party of Canada
Maxime Bernier as Minister of State (Small Business and Tourism and Agriculture)	July 15, 2013	November 3, 2015	Conservative Party of Canada

=== Children and Youth ===
Minister of State (Children and Youth) was a Cabinet of Canada portfolio created in 2003 by Prime Minister Paul Martin to assist with the Minister of Human Resources Development.

Ethel Blondin-Andrew was the first and only holder of this position, which lasted from 12 December 2003 until 19 July 2004.

=== Public Health ===
The Minister of State (Public Health) was a position in the government of Paul Martin that lasted from 12 December 2003 to 5 February 2006.

Carolyn Bennett was the first and only appointment to this position. As minister, Bennett was responsible for setting up the Public Health Agency of Canada.

On 17 May 2004, Bennett announced a new position she called Chief Public Health Officer (CPHO), and that "the CPHO will be primarily located in Winnipeg, with offices in Ottawa, and will have responsibilities for the three key functions of the Agency: infectious diseases, emergency preparedness and chronic diseases." At the time, she appointed an Acting CPHO.

On 23 October 2004 with the advice of a blue-ribbon council, Bennett appointed David Butler-Jones as Canada's first CPHO.

Upon coming to office in 2006, Stephen Harper abolished the position.

=== Urban Affairs ===
Name	Took office	Left office	Party
Bob Andras	June 30, 1971	January 27, 1972	Liberal
Ron Basford	January 28, 1972	August 7, 1974	Liberal
Barney Danson	August 8, 1974	November 2, 1976	Liberal
André Ouellet	November 3, 1976	March 31, 1979	Liberal

=== Science and Technology ===
The Minister of State for Science and Technology assisted the Minister of Science and Technology.

Name	Took office	Left office	Party
Alastair Gillespie	August 8, 1971	November 26, 1972	Liberal
Jeanne Sauvé	November 27, 1972	August 7, 1974	Liberal
Charles Drury	1974	September 14, 1976	Liberal
Judd Buchanan	September 16, 1977	November 23, 1978	Liberal
Alastair Gillespie	November 24, 1978	June 3, 1979	Liberal
Tom Siddon	September 17, 1984	November 19, 1985	Progressive Conservative
Frank Oberle	November 20, 1985	January 29, 1989	Progressive Conservative
Michel Côté	August 11, 1987	August 26, 1987	Progressive Conservative
Robert de Cotret	August 27, 1987	January 29, 1989	Progressive Conservative
William Winegard	January 30, 1989	February 22, 1990	Progressive Conservative
Harvie Andre	January 30, 1989	February 22, 1990	Progressive Conservative

== See also ==
- Minister of State for use of the title in other countries
