= List of parliamentary secretaries of Canada =

The function of Parliamentary Secretary in Canada was created on 1 April 1943 as Parliamentary Assistant and on 4 June 1959 the office of Parliamentary Secretary was created to replace that of Parliamentary Assistant. They are not members of the Cabinet, nor the ministry.

== Sixteenth Canadian ministry ==
- Parliamentary Assistant to the Minister of Agriculture
  - 30 October 1947 – 15 November 1948: Robert McCubbin
- Parliamentary Assistant to the Secretary of State for External Affairs
  - 30 October 1947 – 15 November 1948: Walter Edward Harris
- Parliamentary Assistant to the Minister of Finance
  - 1 April 1943 – 7 March 1945: Douglas Abbott
  - 25 September 1945 – 10 June 1948: Robert Mayhew
  - 30 October 1947 – 15 November 1948: Gleason Belzile
- Parliamentary Assistant to the Minister of Fisheries
  - 22 April 1948 – 10 June 1948: Thomas Reid
  - 11 June 1948 – 15 November 1948: John Watson MacNaught
- Parliamentary Assistant to the Minister of Justice and Attorney General
  - 6 May 1943 – 30 November 1944: Joseph Jean
- Parliamentary Assistant to the Minister of Labour
  - 7 May 1943 – 16 April 1945: Paul Martin Sr.
  - 30 October 1947 – 15 November 1948: Paul-Émile Côté
- Parliamentary Assistant to the Minister of Munitions and Supply
  - 1 April 1943 – 16 April 1945: Lionel Chevrier
- Parliamentary Assistant to the Minister of National Defence
  - 1 April 1943 – 14 November 1944: William Chisholm Macdonald
  - 8 March 1945 – 16 April 1945: Douglas Abbott
  - 25 September 1945 – 15 November 1948: Hugues Lapointe
  - 25 September 1945 – 19 November 1946: William Chisholm Macdonald
- Parliamentary Assistant to the Minister of National Defence for Air
  - 1 April 1943 – 6 June 1946: Cyrus Macmillan
- Parliamentary Assistant to the Minister of National Health and Welfare
  - 30 October 1947 – 15 November 1948: Ralph Maybank
- Parliamentary Assistant to the Minister of National Revenue
  - 30 October 1947 – 10 June 1948: Robert Winters
  - 11 June 1948 – 15 November 1948: Thomas Reid
- Parliamentary Assistant to the President of the Privy Council
  - 6 May 1943 – 12 October 1944: Brooke Claxton
- Parliamentary Assistant to the Minister of Reconstruction
  - 28 September 1945 – 31 December 1945: George McIlraith
- Parliamentary Assistant to the Minister of Reconstruction and Supply
  - 1 January 1946 – 15 November 1948: George McIlraith
- Parliamentary Assistant to the Minister of Trade and Commerce
  - 3 February 1948 – 15 November 1948: George McIlraith
- Parliamentary Assistant to the Minister of Transport
  - 11 June 1948 – 15 November 1948: Robert Winters
- Parliamentary Assistant to the Minister of Veterans Affairs
  - 27 September 1945 – 21 April 1948: Walter Tucker
  - 11 June 1948 – 15 November 1948: Leslie Mutch

== Seventeenth Canadian ministry ==
- Parliamentary Assistant to the Prime Minister
  - 15 November 1948 – 17 January 1950: Walter Edward Harris
  - 25 August 1953 – 12 April 1957: William Gilbert Weir
- Parliamentary Assistant to the Minister of Agriculture
  - 15 November 1948 – 12 April 1957: Robert McCubbin
- Parliamentary Assistant to the Minister of Defence Production
  - 1 April 1951 – 13 June 1953: George McIlraith
  - 27 August 1953 – 12 April 1957: John Dickey
- Parliamentary Assistant to the Minister of External Affairs
  - 19 January 1949 – 23 August 1949: Hugues Lapointe
  - 24 January 1951 – 31 December 1952: Jean Lesage
  - 14 October 1953 – 30 June 1954: Roch Pinard
  - 9 February 1956 – 12 April 1957: Lucien Cardin
- Parliamentary Assistant to the Minister of Finance
  - 15 November 1948 – 25 July 1950: Gleason Belzile
  - 19 January 1949 – 14 October 1952: James Sinclair
  - 1 January 1953 – 16 September 1953: Jean Lesage
  - 14 October 1953 – 12 April 1957: William Moore Benidickson
- Parliamentary Assistant to the Minister of Fisheries
  - 15 November 1948 – 12 April 1957: John Watson MacNaught
- Parliamentary Assistant to the Minister of Labour
  - 15 November 1948 – 31 December 1953: Paul-Émile Côté
  - 9 February 1956 – 12 April 1957: Joseph-Adéodat Blanchette
- Parliamentary Assistant to the Minister of Mines and Resources
  - 15 November 1948 – 17 January 1950: Ralph Maybank
- Parliamentary Assistant to the Minister of Mines and Technical Surveys
  - 18 January 1950 – 23 January 1951: Ralph Maybank
- Parliamentary Assistant to the Minister of National Defence
  - 15 November 1948 – 18 January 1949: Hugues Lapointe
  - 19 January 1949 – 30 April 1949: Loran Ellis Baker
  - 19 January 1949 – 8 February 1956: Joseph-Adéodat Blanchette
  - 24 January 1951 – 14 October 1952: Ralph Campney
  - 9 February 1956 – 12 April 1957: Paul Hellyer
- Parliamentary Assistant to the Minister of National Health and Welfare
  - 15 November 1948 – 24 January 1949: Ralph Maybank
  - 25 January 1949 – 6 September 1949: Thomas Reid
  - 24 January 1951 – 13 June 1953: Emmett McCusker
  - 14 October 1953 – 12 April 1957: Frederick Robertson
- Parliamentary Assistant to the Minister of National Revenue
  - 15 November 1948 – 24 January 1949: Thomas Reid
- Parliamentary Assistant to the Postmaster General
  - 24 January 1951 – 13 October 1953: Léopold Langlois
  - 14 October 1953 – 12 April 1957: Thomas Andrew Murray Kirk
- Parliamentary Assistant to the Minister of Public Works
  - 14 October 1953 – 12 April 1957: Maurice Bourget
- Parliamentary Assistant to the Minister of Resources and Development
  - 1 February 1950 – 12 December 1950: George Prudham
  - 24 January 1951 – 30 July 1951: Ralph Maybank
- Parliamentary Assistant to the Minister of Trade and Commerce
  - 15 November 1948 – 13 June 1953: George McIlraith
- Parliamentary Assistant to the Minister of Transport
  - 24 January 1951 – 13 September 1953: William Moore Benidickson
  - 14 October 1953 – 12 April 1957: Léopold Langlois
- Parliamentary Assistant to the Minister of Veterans Affairs
  - 15 November 1948 – 13 June 1953: Leslie Mutch
  - 14 October 1953 – 12 April 1957: Colin Emerson Bennett

== Eighteenth Canadian ministry (to 1959, Parliamentary Assistant) ==
- Parliamentary Assistant to the Prime Minister
  - 19 August 1957 – 9 January 1958: Wally Nesbitt
  - Became Parliamentary Secretary to the Prime Minister
- Parliamentary Secretary to the Prime Minister
  - Was Parliamentary Assistant to the Prime Minister
  - 18 November 1959 – 17 November 1961: Paul Martineau
  - 18 November 1960 – 19 April 1962: John Pallett
  - 18 January 1962 – 6 February 1963: Théogène Ricard
  - 17 August 1962 – 6 February 1963: Ged Baldwin
- Parliamentary Assistant to the Minister of Agriculture
  - 7 August 1957 – 1 February 1958: John A. Charlton
  - Became Parliamentary Secretary to the Minister of Agriculture
- Parliamentary Secretary to the Minister of Agriculture
  - Was Parliamentary Assistant to the Minister of Agriculture
  - 18 November 1959 – 17 November 1961: Elston Cardiff
  - 18 October 1960 – 6 February 1963: Warner Jorgenson
  - 18 January 1962 – 19 April 1962: John A. Charlton
  - 17 August 1962 – 6 February 1963: Louis-Joseph Pigeon
- Parliamentary Assistant to the Minister of Citizenship and Immigration
  - 6 November 1957 – 1 February 1958: John Borden Hamilton
  - Became Parliamentary Secretary to the Minister of Citizenship and Immigration
- Parliamentary Secretary to the Minister of Citizenship and Immigration
  - Was Parliamentary Assistant to the Minister of Citizenship and Immigration
  - 18 November 1959 – 17 November 1961: John A. Charlton
  - 17 August 1962 – 6 February 1963: Frank Charles McGee
- Parliamentary Assistant to the Minister of External Affairs
  - 10 January 1958 – 1 February 1958: Wally Nesbitt
  - Became Parliamentary Secretary to the Minister of External Affairs
- Parliamentary Secretary to the Minister of External Affairs
  - Was Parliamentary Assistant to the Minister of External Affairs
  - 1 September 1959 – 17 November 1961: Wally Nesbitt
  - 17 August 1962 – 6 February 1963: Heath MacQuarrie
- Parliamentary Assistant to the Minister of Finance
  - 19 August 1957 – 1 February 1958: Dick Bell
  - Became Parliamentary Secretary to the Minister of Finance
- Parliamentary Secretary to the Minister of Finance
  - Was Parliamentary Assistant to the Minister of Finance
  - 18 November 1959 – 19 April 1962: Dick Bell
  - 17 August 1962 – 6 February 1963: Heward Grafftey
- Parliamentary Secretary to the Minister of Fisheries
  - 18 November 1959 – 19 April 1962: Roland English
  - 17 August 1962 – 6 February 1963: Albert McPhillips
- Parliamentary Assistant to the Minister of Justice
  - 19 August 1957 – 1 February 1958: David James Walker
  - Became Parliamentary Secretary to the Minister of Justice
- Parliamentary Secretary to the Minister of Justice
  - Was Parliamentary Assistant to the Minister of Justice
  - 18 November 1959 – 6 February 1963: Thomas Miller Bell
- Parliamentary Assistant to the Minister of Labour
  - 7 August 1957 – 1 February 1958: Arthur Maloney
  - Became Parliamentary Secretary to the Minister of Labour
- Parliamentary Secretary to the Minister of Labour
  - Was Parliamentary Assistant to the Minister of Labour
  - 18 November 1959 – 19 April 1962: Richard Thrasher
  - 17 August 1962 – 6 February 1963: Alfred Hales
- Parliamentary Assistant to the Minister of Mines and Technical Surveys
  - 7 August 1957 – 1 February 1958: Raymond O'Hurley
  - Became Parliamentary Secretary to the Minister of Mines and Technical Surveys
- Parliamentary Secretary to the Minister of Mines and Technical Surveys
  - Was Parliamentary Assistant to the Minister of Mines and Technical Surveys
  - 17 August 1962 – 6 February 1963: James Aloysius McGrath
- Parliamentary Assistant to the Minister of National Defence
  - 7 August 1957 – 1 February 1958: Marcel Lambert
  - Became Parliamentary Secretary to the Minister of National Defence
- Parliamentary Secretary to the Minister of National Defence
  - Was Parliamentary Assistant to the Minister of National Defence
  - 18 November 1959 – 19 April 1962: Egan Chambers
- Parliamentary Assistant to the Minister of National Health and Welfare
  - 7 August 1957 – 1 February 1958: Ernest Halpenny
  - Became Parliamentary Secretary to the Minister of National Health and Welfare
- Parliamentary Secretary to the Minister of National Health and Welfare
  - Was Parliamentary Assistant to the Minister of National Health and Welfare
  - 18 January 1962 – 19 April 1962: Elston Cardiff
  - 17 August 1962 – 6 February 1963: Jean Casselman Wadds
- Parliamentary Secretary to the Minister of National Revenue
  - 18 November 1959 – 19 April 1962: Marcel Lambert
- Parliamentary Secretary to the Postmaster General
  - 18 November 1959 – 17 November 1960: Edmund L. Morris
- Parliamentary Assistant to the Minister of Public Works
  - 7 August 1957 – 1 February 1958: Clayton Hodgson
  - Became Parliamentary Secretary to the Minister of Public Works
- Parliamentary Secretary to the Minister of Public Works
  - Was Parliamentary Assistant to the Minister of Public Works
  - 18 November 1959 – 19 April 1962: Yvon Tassé
  - 17 August 1962 – 6 February 1963: Robert McCleave
- Parliamentary Assistant to the Minister of Trade and Commerce
  - 7 August 1957 – 9 January 1958: Thomas Miller Bell
  - Became Parliamentary Secretary to the Minister of Trade and Commerce
- Parliamentary Secretary to the Minister of Trade and Commerce
  - Was Parliamentary Assistant to the Minister of Trade and Commerce
  - 18 November 1959 – 17 November 1960: John Pallett
  - 18 October 1960 – 19 April 1962: Edmund L. Morris
  - 17 August 1962 – 6 February 1963: Wally Nesbitt
- Parliamentary Assistant to the Minister of Transport
  - 7 August 1957 – 1 February 1958: Angus Ronald Macdonald
  - Became Parliamentary Secretary to the Minister of Transport
- Parliamentary Secretary to the Minister of Transport
  - Was Parliamentary Assistant to the Minister of Transport
  - 18 November 1959 – 17 November 1961: Clayton Hodgson
  - 18 November 1961 – 19 April 1962: Quinto Martini
  - 17 August 1962 – 6 February 1963: James Alexander McBain
- Parliamentary Assistant to the Minister of Veterans Affairs
  - 19 August 1957 – 1 February 1958: Walter Dinsdale
  - Became Parliamentary Secretary to the Minister of Veterans Affairs
- Parliamentary Secretary to the Minister of Veterans Affairs
  - Was Parliamentary Assistant to the Minister of Veterans Affairs
  - 18 November 1959 – 10 October 1960: Walter Dinsdale
  - 16 November 1960 – 6 February 1963: Henry Frank Jones

== Nineteenth Canadian ministry ==
- Parliamentary Secretary to the Prime Minister
  - 14 May 1963 – 19 February 1964: Alexis Caron
  - 14 May 1963 – 8 September 1965: Jack Davis
  - 17 February 1964 – 23 November 1964: Guy Rouleau
  - 16 July 1965 – 8 September 1965: Jean Chrétien
  - 7 January 1966 – 3 April 1967: Pierre Trudeau
  - 7 January 1966 – 20 April 1968: John Matheson
- Parliamentary Secretary to the Minister of Agriculture
  - 14 May 1963 – 8 September 1965: Bruce Beer
- Parliamentary Secretary to the Minister of Citizenship and Immigration
  - 14 May 1963 – 19 February 1964: John Munro
  - 20 February 1964 – 8 September 1965: Hubert Badanai
  - 7 January 1966 – 30 September 1966: John Munro
- Parliamentary Secretary to the Minister of Consumer and Corporate Affairs
  - 7 January 1968 – 20 April 1968: Ovide Laflamme
- Parliamentary Secretary to the Minister of Energy, Mines and Resources
  - 1 October 1966 – 20 April 1968: Jack Davis
- Parliamentary Secretary to the Minister of External Affairs
  - 14 May 1963 – 19 February 1964: John Benjamin Stewart
  - 20 February 1964 – 8 September 1965: Stanley Haidasz
  - 7 January 1966 – 7 January 1968: Donald Stovel Macdonald
  - 20 April 1967 – 20 April 1968: Gérard Pelletier
- Parliamentary Secretary to the Minister of Finance
  - 14 May 1963 – 28 June 1964: Edgar Benson
  - 30 June 1964 – 6 July 1965: Lawrence Pennell
  - 16 July 1965 – 8 September 1965: Donald Stovel Macdonald
  - 7 January 1966 – 3 April 1967: Jean Chrétien
- Parliamentary Secretary to the Minister of Fisheries
  - 7 January 1966 – 31 July 1966: Charles Granger
  - 4 October 1966 – 20 April 1968: Richard Cashin
- Parliamentary Secretary to the Minister of Forestry
  - 1 October 1966 – 20 April 1968: Bruce Beer
- Parliamentary Secretary to the Minister of Indian Affairs and Northern Development
  - 1 October 1966 – 20 April 1968: Stanley Haidasz
- Parliamentary Secretary to the Minister of Industry
  - 16 July 1965 – 8 September 1965: David Hahn
  - 7 January 1968 – 20 April 1968: Donald Stovel Macdonald
- Parliamentary Secretary to the Minister of Justice
  - 14 May 1963 – 15 July 1965: Donald Stovel Macdonald
  - 16 July 1965 – 8 September 1965: Jean-Charles Cantin
- Parliamentary Secretary to the Minister of Labour
  - 14 May 1963 – 8 September 1965: James Allen Byrne
  - 7 January 1966 – 8 February 1968: Bryce Mackasey
- Parliamentary Secretary to the Minister of Manpower and Immigration
  - 1 October 1966 – 20 April 1968: John Munro
- Parliamentary Secretary to the Minister of Mines and Technical Surveys
  - 7 January 1966 – 30 September 1966: Jack Davis
- Parliamentary Secretary to the Minister of National Health and Welfare
  - 14 May 1963 – 19 February 1964: Stanley Haidasz
  - 20 February 1964 – 15 July 1965: John Munro
  - 16 July 1965 – 8 September 1965: Bryce Mackasey
  - 7 January 1966 – 20 April 1968: Margaret Rideout
- Parliamentary Secretary to the Minister of National Revenue
  - 7 January 1966 – 7 January 1968: James Edgar Walker
- Parliamentary Secretary to the Minister of Northern Affairs and National Resources
  - 14 May 1963 – 8 September 1965: John Turner
  - 7 January 1966 – 30 September 1966: Stanley Haidasz
- Parliamentary Secretary to the Postmaster General
  - 14 May 1963 – 19 February 1964: George Roy McWilliam
  - 20 February 1964 – 8 September 1965: Alexis Caron
- Parliamentary Secretary to the Minister of Public Works
  - 14 May 1963 – 19 February 1964: Hubert Badanai
  - 20 February 1964 – 8 September 1965: George Roy McWilliam
  - 7 January 1966 – 20 April 1968: John Benjamin Stewart
- Parliamentary Secretary to the Registrar General of Canada
  - 20 April 1967 – 7 January 1968: Ovide Laflamme
- Parliamentary Secretary to the Secretary of State of Canada
  - 14 May 1963 – 2 February 1964: Yvon Dupuis
  - 20 February 1964 – 8 September 1965: John Benjamin Stewart
  - 7 January 1966 – 20 April 1968: Albert Béchard
- Parliamentary Secretary to the Minister of Trade and Commerce
  - 14 May 1963 – 6 July 1965: Jean-Luc Pépin
  - 16 July 1965 – 8 September 1965: John Munro
  - 7 January 1966 – 20 April 1968: Jean-Charles Cantin
- Parliamentary Secretary to the Minister of Transport
  - 14 May 1963 – 15 July 1965: Jean-Charles Cantin
  - 7 January 1966 – 20 April 1968: James Allen Byrne
- Parliamentary Secretary to the President of the Treasury Board
  - 7 January 1968 – 20 April 1968: James Edgar Walker
- Parliamentary Secretary to the Minister of Veterans Affairs
  - 14 May 1963 – 8 September 1965: Chesley William Carter

== Twentieth Canadian ministry ==
- Parliamentary Secretary to the Prime Minister
  - 20 April 1968 – 23 April 1968: John Matheson
  - 30 August 1968 – 30 September 1970: James Edgar Walker
  - 1 October 1970 – 1 September 1972: Barney Danson
- Parliamentary Secretary to the Minister of Agriculture
  - 20 April 1968 – 23 April 1968: Bruce Beer
  - 30 August 1968 – 30 September 1970: Florian Côté
  - 1 October 1970 – 1 September 1972: Marcel Lessard
  - 22 December 1972 – 14 September 1975: Léopold Corriveau
  - 10 October 1975 – 1 October 1977: Irénée Pelletier
  - 1 October 1977 – 26 March 1979: Yves Caron
- Parliamentary Secretary to the Minister of Communications
  - 1 October 1971 – 1 September 1972: Joseph-Roland Comtois
  - 10 October 1975 – 30 September 1976: James Fleming
  - 1 October 1976 – 30 September 1977: Ross Milne
  - 1 October 1977 – 26 March 1979: Crawford Douglas
- Parliamentary Secretary to the Minister of Consumer and Corporate Affairs
  - 20 April 1968 – 23 April 1968: Ovide Laflamme
  - 30 August 1968 – 19 October 1969: Stanley Haidasz
  - 20 October 1969 – 30 September 1970: Paul Langlois
  - 1 October 1971 – 1 September 1972: Donald Tolmie
  - 1 January 1974 – 9 May 1974: Pierre De Bané
  - 15 September 1974 – 14 September 1975: Norman Cafik
  - 10 October 1975 – 30 September 1976: Art Lee
  - 1 October 1976 – 30 September 1977: Claude Lajoie
  - 1 October 1977 – 30 September 1978: Alan Gray Martin
  - 1 October 1978 – 26 March 1979: Aideen Nicholson
- Parliamentary Secretary to the Minister of Employment and Immigration
  - 1 October 1977 – 30 September 1978: Raymond Dupont
  - 1 October 1978 – 26 March 1979: Frank Maine
- Parliamentary Secretary to the Minister of the Environment
  - 11 June 1971 – 1 September 1972: Eymard Corbin
  - 22 December 1972 – 9 May 1974: Bill Rompkey
  - 15 September 1974 – 14 September 1975: Leonard Marchand
  - 10 October 1975 – 30 September 1976: George Baker
  - 1 October 1976 – 30 September 1977: James Fleming
  - 1 October 1978 – 26 March 1979: Jack Pearsall
- Parliamentary Secretary to the Minister of State (Environment)
  - 1 October 1977 – 30 September 1978: Mike Landers
- Parliamentary Secretary to the Minister of External Affairs
  - 30 August 1968 – 30 September 1970: Jean-Pierre Goyer
  - 1 October 1970 – 12 August 1971: André Ouellet
  - 1 October 1971 – 1 September 1972: Gaston Isabelle
  - 1 October 1971 – 1 September 1972: Paul St. Pierre
  - 22 December 1972 – 21 December 1973: Pierre De Bané
  - 15 September 1974 – 14 September 1975: Herb Breau
  - 10 October 1975 – 30 September 1976: Monique Bégin
  - 1 October 1976 – 30 September 1977: Fernand Leblanc
  - 1 October 1977 – 30 September 1978: Maurice Dupras
  - 1 October 1978 – 26 March 1979: Louis Duclos
- Parliamentary Secretary to the Minister of State (Federal-Provincial Relations)
  - 1 October 1978 – 26 March 1979: Gus MacFarlane
- Parliamentary Secretary to the Minister of Finance
  - 30 August 1968 – 19 October 1969: Herb Gray
  - 1 October 1970 – 27 January 1972: Pat Mahoney
  - 3 February 1972 – 1 September 1972: Judd Buchanan
  - 22 December 1972 – 9 May 1974: Joseph-Roland Comtois
  - 15 September 1974 – 14 September 1975: Bud Cullen
  - 10 October 1975 – 30 September 1976: Jacques Trudel
  - 1 October 1976 – 30 September 1977: Bob Kaplan
  - 1 October 1977 – 30 September 1978: Ed Lumley
  - 1 October 1978 – 26 March 1979: Alan Gray Martin
- Parliamentary Secretary to the Minister of Fisheries
  - 20 April 1968 – 23 April 1968: Richard Cashin
  - 30 August 1968 – 31 March 1969: Eugene Whelan
- Parliamentary Secretary to the Minister of Fisheries and Forestry
  - 1 August 1969 – 30 September 1970: Eugene Whelan
  - 1 October 1970 – 10 June 1971: Eymard Corbin
- Parliamentary Secretary to the Minister of Forestry and Rural Development
  - 30 August 1968 – 31 March 1969: Russell Honey
- Parliamentary Secretary to the Minister of Indian Affairs and Northern Development
  - 20 April 1968 – 23 April 1968: Stanley Haidasz
  - 20 October 1969 – 30 September 1970: Russell Honey
  - 1 October 1970 – 2 February 1972: Judd Buchanan
  - 3 February 1972 – 1 September 1972: Allen Sulatycky
  - 22 December 1972 – 9 May 1974: Leonard Marchand
  - 15 September 1974 – 30 September 1976: Iona Campagnolo
  - 1 October 1976 – 30 September 1977: Keith Penner
  - 1 October 1977 – 30 September 1978: Ross Milne
  - 1 October 1978 – 26 March 1979: Hugh Alan Anderson
- Parliamentary Secretary to the Minister of Industry, Trade and Commerce
  - 1 October 1970 – 1 September 1972: Bruce Howard
  - 22 December 1972 – 21 December 1973: Herb Breau
  - 1 January 1974 - 9 May 1974: Raynald Guay
  - 15 September 1974 – 14 September 1975: Gaston Clermont
  - 10 October 1975 – 13 September 1976: Marcel-Claude Roy
  - 1 October 1976 – 30 September 1977: Hugh Poulin
  - 1 October 1977 – 26 March 1979: Bernard Loiselle
- Parliamentary Secretary to the Minister of Justice and Attorney General of Canada
  - 30 August 1968 – 30 September 1970: Jean-Charles Cantin
  - 1 October 1970 – 2 February 1972: Albert Béchard
  - 22 December 1972 – 21 December 1973: Raynald Guay
  - 1 January 1974 – 14 September 1975: Gilles Marceau
  - 10 October 1975 – 13 September 1976: Francis Fox
  - 1 October 1976 – 30 September 1977: Mike Landers
  - 1 October 1977 – 30 September 1978: Roger Carl Young
  - 1 October 1978 – 26 March 1979: Claude-André Lachance
- Parliamentary Secretary to the Minister of Labour
  - 30 August 1968 – 30 September 1970: James McNulty
  - 1 October 1970 – 2 February 1972: Ray Perrault
  - 22 December 1972 – 9 May 1974: Charles Turner
  - 15 September 1974 – 14 September 1975: Mark MacGuigan
  - 10 October 1975 – 13 September 1976: Fernand Leblanc
  - 1 October 1976 – 30 September 1978: Jacques Olivier
  - 1 October 1978 – 26 March 1979: Dennis Dawson
- Parliamentary Secretary to the Minister of Manpower and Immigration
  - 30 August 1968 – 19 October 1969: Gérard Loiselle
  - 20 October 1969 – 30 September 1970: Rosaire Gendron
  - 1 October 1970 – 30 September 1971: Charles Caccia
  - 1 October 1971 – 2 February 1972: Marcel Prud'homme
  - 3 February 1972 – 1 September 1972: Ray Perrault
  - 22 December 1972 – 9 May 1974: Mark MacGuigan
  - 15 September 1974 – 14 September 1975: Bill Rompkey
  - 10 October 1975 – 30 September 1977: Arthur Portelance
- Parliamentary Secretary to the Minister of State (Multiculturalism)
  - 1 October 1977 – 26 March 1979: William Andres
- Parliamentary Secretary to the Minister of National Defence
  - 30 August 1968 – 30 September 1970: David Groos
  - 1 October 1971 – 2 February 1972: Bud Cullen
  - 22 December 1972 – 14 September 1975: Len Hopkins
  - 10 October 1975 – 30 September 1977: Maurice Dionne
  - 1 October 1977 – 30 September 1978: Jacques Guilbault
  - 1 October 1978 – 26 March 1979: Raymond Dupont
- Parliamentary Secretary to the Minister of National Health and Welfare
  - 20 April 1968 – 23 April 1968: Margaret Rideout
  - 30 August 1968 – 19 October 1969: Rosaire Gendron
  - 20 October 1969 – 30 September 1970: Stanley Haidasz
  - 1 October 1970 – 30 September 1971: Gaston Isabelle
  - 13 August 1971 – 1 September 1972: André Ouellet
  - 22 December 1972 – 9 May 1974: Norman Cafik
  - 15 September 1974 – 14 September 1975: Coline Campbell
  - 10 October 1975 – 30 September 1976: Bob Kaplan
  - 1 October 1976 – 30 September 1977: Paul McRae
  - 1 October 1977 – 26 March 1979: Ken Robinson
- Parliamentary Secretary to the Minister of National Revenue
  - 3 February 1972 – 1 September 1972: Ian Watson
  - 10 October 1975 – 30 September 1976: Claude Lajoie
  - 1 October 1976 – 30 September 1977: George Baker
  - 1 October 1977 – 26 March 1979: Yves Demers
- Parliamentary Secretary to the Postmaster General
  - 1 October 1971 – 1 September 1972: Gerald Cobbe
  - 15 September 1974 – 14 September 1975: Raynald Guay
  - 10 October 1975 – 30 September 1976: Paul McRae
  - 1 October 1976 – 30 September 1977: Walter Bernard Smith
  - 1 October 1978 – 26 March 1979: David Collenette
- Parliamentary Secretary to the President of the Privy Council
  - 30 August 1968 – 30 September 1970: Yves Forest
  - 1 October 1970 – 1 September 1972: James Jerome
  - 22 December 1972 – 9 May 1974: John Mercer Reid
  - 1 January 1974 – 9 May 1974: Maurice Foster
  - 15 September 1974 – 14 September 1975: John Mercer Reid
  - 10 October 1975 – 30 September 1976: Jean-Jacques Blais
  - 1 October 1976 – 30 September 1977: Ralph Goodale
  - 1 October 1977 – 26 March 1979: Yvon Pinard
- Parliamentary Secretary to the Minister of Public Works
  - 20 April 1968 – 23 April 1968: John Benjamin Stewart
  - 30 August 1968 – 19 October 1969: Paul Langlois
  - 1 October 1971 – 1 September 1972: Gustave Blouin
  - 15 September 1974 – 14 September 1975: Charles Turner
  - 10 October 1975 – 30 September 1977: Alexandre Cyr
  - 1 October 1977 – 30 September 1978: Frank Maine
  - 1 October 1978 – 26 March 1979: Hal Herbert
- Parliamentary Secretary to the Minister of Regional Economic Expansion
  - 1 April 1969 – 19 October 1969: Russell Honey
  - 20 October 1969 – 12 August 1971: Martin O'Connell
  - 1 October 1971 – 1 September 1972: John Roberts
  - 22 December 1972 – 9 May 1974: Marcel Prud'homme
  - 15 September 1974 – 14 September 1975: Joseph-Philippe Guay
  - 10 October 1975 – 30 September 1976: Joseph Clifford McIsaac
  - 1 October 1976 – 30 September 1977: Ed Lumley
  - 1 October 1977 – 26 March 1979: Donald Wood
- Parliamentary Secretary to the Minister of Science and Technology
  - 15 September 1974 – 14 September 1975: Charles Turner
  - 10 October 1975 – 30 September 1976: Keith Penner
  - 1 October 1977 - 30 September 1978: Frank Maine
  - 1 October 1978 – 26 March 1979: Pierre Bussières
- Parliamentary Secretary to the Secretary of State of Canada
  - 20 April 1968 – 23 April 1968: Albert Béchard
  - 30 August 1968 – 19 October 1969: Robert Stanbury
  - 1 October 1970 – 1 September 1972: Hugh Faulkner
  - 3 February 1972 – 1 September 1972: Marcel Prud'homme
  - 22 December 1972 – 21 December 1973: Gilles Marceau
  - 15 September 1974 – 14 September 1975: Gustave Blouin
  - 10 October 1975 – 30 September 1976: Coline Campbell
  - 1 October 1976 – 30 September 1977: Jacques Guilbault
  - 1 October 1977 – 26 March 1979: Robert Daudlin
- Parliamentary Secretary to the Solicitor General of Canada
  - 20 October 1969 – 4 March 1970: Charles Caccia
  - 1 October 1971 – 1 September 1972: Douglas Hogarth
  - 10 October 1975 – 30 September 1976: Hugh Poulin
  - 1 October 1976 – 30 September 1977: Art Lee
  - 1 October 1977 - 30 September 1978: Roderick Blaker
  - 1 October 1978 – 26 March 1979: Roger Carl Young
- Parliamentary Secretary to the Minister of Supply and Services
  - 1 October 1971 – 1 September 1972: Steve Otto
  - 10 October 1975 – 30 September 1976: Walter Bernard Smith
  - 1 October 1976 – 30 September 1977: Roderick Blaker
  - 1 October 1977 – 30 September 1978: Aideen Nicholson
  - 1 October 1978 – 26 March 1979: Maurice Harquail
- Parliamentary Secretary to the Minister of Trade and Commerce
  - 20 April 1968 – 23 April 1968: Jean-Charles Cantin
- Parliamentary Secretary to the Minister of Transport
  - 20 April 1968 – 23 April 1968: James Allen Byrne
  - 20 October 1969 – 30 September 1970: Gérard Loiselle
  - 1 October 1970 – 1 September 1972: Gérard Duquet
  - 22 December 1972 – 9 May 1974: Joseph-Philippe Guay
  - 15 September 1974 – 14 September 1975: Joseph Clifford McIsaac
  - 10 October 1975 – 30 September 1976: Ralph Goodale
  - 1 October 1976 – 30 September 1977: Marcel-Claude Roy
  - 1 October 1977 – 26 March 1979: Charles Lapointe
- Parliamentary Secretary to the President of the Treasury Board
  - 20 April 1968 – 23 April 1968: James Edgar Walker
  - 5 March 1970 – 30 September 1970: Charles Caccia
  - 1 October 1970 – 12 August 1971: Alastair Gillespie
  - 1 October 1971 – 1 September 1972: Gaston Clermont
  - 10 October 1975 – 30 September 1976: Cyril Lloyd Francis
  - 1 October 1976 – 30 September 1977: Jacques Trudel
  - 1 October 1977 – 26 March 1979: Thomas Lefebvre
- Parliamentary Secretary to the Minister of Urban Affairs
  - 1 October 1971 – 1 September 1972: David Weatherhead
  - 22 December 1972 – 9 May 1974: Ian Watson
  - 15 September 1974 – 14 September 1975: Pierre De Bané
  - 10 October 1975 – 30 September 1977: Jean-Robert Gauthier
  - 1 October 1977 – 30 September 1978: Maurice Harquail
  - 1 October 1978 – 26 March 1979: Hal Herbert
- Parliamentary Secretary to the Minister of Veterans Affairs
  - 1 October 1971 – 1 September 1972: Cyril Lloyd Francis
  - 10 October 1975 – 30 September 1977: Victor Railton
  - 1 October 1977 – 26 March 1979: Gilbert Parent

== Twenty-First Canadian ministry ==
- Parliamentary Secretary to the Prime Minister
  - 1 October 1979 – 14 December 1979: John Bosley
- Parliamentary Secretary to the Minister of Agriculture
  - 1 October 1979 – 14 December 1979: Bert Hargrave
- Parliamentary Secretary to the Minister of Communications
  - 1 October 1979 – 14 December 1979: T. Scott Fennell
- Parliamentary Secretary to the Minister of Consumer and Corporate Affairs
  - 1 October 1979 – 14 December 1979: Gary Gurbin
- Parliamentary Secretary to the Minister of Employment and Immigration
  - 1 October 1979 – 14 December 1979: Paul McCrossan
- Parliamentary Secretary to the Minister of Energy, Mines and Resources
  - 1 October 1979 – 14 December 1979: Bob Jarvis
- Parliamentary Secretary to the Minister of Environment and Postmaster General
  - 1 October 1979 – 14 December 1979: Joseph Reid
- Parliamentary Secretary to the Minister of External Affairs
  - 1 October 1979 – 14 December 1979: Douglas Roche
- Parliamentary Secretary to the Minister of Finance
  - 1 October 1979 – 14 December 1979: Ron Ritchie
- Parliamentary Secretary to the Minister of Fisheries and Oceans
  - 1 October 1979 – 14 December 1979: Tom Siddon
- Parliamentary Secretary to the Minister of Indian Affairs and Northern Development
  - 1 October 1979 – 14 December 1979: John Robert Holmes
- Parliamentary Secretary to the Minister of Justice
  - 1 October 1979 – 14 December 1979: George Cooper
- Parliamentary Secretary to the Minister of Labour
  - 1 October 1979 – 14 December 1979: William Wightman
- Parliamentary Secretary to the Minister of National Defence and Veterans Affairs
  - 1 October 1979 – 14 December 1979: A. Daniel McKenzie
- Parliamentary Secretary to the Minister of National Health and Welfare
  - 1 October 1979 – 14 December 1979: Stan Schellenberger
- Parliamentary Secretary to the President of the Privy Council
  - 1 October 1979 – 14 December 1979: David Kilgour
- Parliamentary Secretary to the Minister of Regional Economic Expansion
  - 1 October 1979 – 14 December 1979: Richard Janelle
- Parliamentary Secretary to the Secretary of State of Canada
  - 1 October 1979 – 14 December 1979: Diane Stratas
- Parliamentary Secretary to the Solicitor General
  - 1 October 1979 – 14 December 1979: Chris Speyer
- Parliamentary Secretary to the Minister of Supply and Services
  - 1 October 1979 – 14 December 1979: Doug Lewis
- Parliamentary Secretary to the Minister of Transport
  - 1 October 1979 – 14 December 1979: Otto Jelinek
- Parliamentary Secretary to the President of the Treasury Board
  - 1 October 1979 – 14 December 1979: Jack Murta

== Twenty-Second Canadian ministry ==
- Parliamentary Secretary to the Minister of Agriculture
  - 4 March 1980 – 28 February 1982: Marcel Ostiguy
  - 1 March 1982 – 29 February 1984: Marcel Dionne
  - 1 March 1984 – 29 June 1984: André Bachand
- Parliamentary Secretary to the Minister of Communications
  - 4 March 1980 – 1 July 1981: Peter Stollery
  - 1 October 1981 – 30 September 1982: Jack Masters
  - 1 October 1982 – 29 June 1984: Jack Burghardt
- Parliamentary Secretary to the Minister of Consumer and Corporate Affairs
  - 4 March 1980 – 30 September 1980: Aideen Nicholson
  - 1 October 1980 – 30 September 1982: Gary McCauley
  - 1 October 1982 – 29 February 1984: David Berger
  - 1 March 1984 – 29 June 1984: Michel Veillette
- Parliamentary Secretary to the Deputy Prime Minister
  - 1 March 1982 – 30 September 1982: Douglas Fisher
  - 1 October 1982 – 30 September 1983: Jean Lapierre
  - 1 October 1983 – 29 June 1984: Suzanne Beauchamp-Niquet
- Parliamentary Secretary to the Minister of State for Economic Development
  - 1 October 1982 – 30 September 1983: Jim Peterson
- Parliamentary Secretary to the Minister of Employment and Immigration
  - 4 March 1980 – 30 September 1981: Dennis Dawson
  - 1 October 1981 – 30 September 1983: Rémi Bujold
  - 1 October 1983 – 29 June 1984: Jean-Guy Dubois
- Parliamentary Secretary to the Minister of Energy, Mines and Resources
  - 4 March 1980 – 28 February 1982: Roy MacLaren
  - 1 March 1982 – 29 February 1984: David Dingwall
  - 1 March 1984 – 29 June 1984: Len Hopkins
- Parliamentary Secretary to the Minister of the Environment
  - 4 March 1980 – 28 February 1982: Roger Simmons
  - 1 March 1982 – 30 September 1982: James Schroder
  - 1 October 1982 – 29 June 1984: Denis Éthier
- Parliamentary Secretary to the Minister of External Affairs
  - 4 March 1980 – 30 September 1981: Louis Duclos
  - 1 October 1981 – 30 September 1982: Ron Irwin
  - 1 October 1982 – 30 September 1983: Jean Lapierre
  - 1 October 1983 – 29 June 1984: Suzanne Beauchamp-Niquet
- Parliamentary Secretary to the Minister of Finance
  - 4 March 1980 – 28 February 1982: John Evans
  - 1 March 1982 – 29 February 1984: Douglas Fisher
  - 1 March 1984 – 29 June 1984: Ralph Ferguson
- Parliamentary Secretary to the Minister of State (Finance)
  - 1 March 1984 – 29 June 1984: Alain Garant
- Parliamentary Secretary to the Minister of Fisheries and Oceans
  - 4 March 1980 – 30 September 1981: George Henderson
  - 1 October 1981 – 29 February 1984: Brian Tobin
  - 1 March 1984 – 29 June 1984: Maurice Harquail
- Parliamentary Secretary to the Minister of Indian Affairs and Northern Development
  - 4 March 1980 – 30 September 1982: Bernard Loiselle
  - 1 October 1982 – 30 September 1983: Henri Tousignant
  - 1 October 1983 – 29 February 1984: André Maltais
  - 1 March 1984 – 29 June 1984: René Gingras
- Parliamentary Secretary to the Minister of Industry, Trade and Commerce
  - 4 March 1980 – 28 February 1982: Gérald Laniel
  - 1 October 1982 – 30 September 1983: André Maltais
  - 1 October 1983 – 6 December 1983: Henri Tousignant
- Parliamentary Secretary to the Minister of Justice and Attorney General of Canada
  - 4 March 1980 – 30 September 1980: Ken Robinson
  - 1 October 1980 – 30 September 1981: Ron Irwin
  - 1 October 1981 – 30 September 1982: Jim Peterson
  - 1 October 1982 – 29 June 1984: Al MacBain
- Parliamentary Secretary to the Minister of Labour
  - 4 March 1980 – 30 September 1980: Gilbert Parent
  - 1 October 1980 – 13 May 1981: Louis Desmarais
  - 26 May 1981 – 30 September 1981: Gilbert Parent
  - 1 October 1981 – 30 September 1983: Antonio Yanakis
  - 1 October 1983 – 29 June 1984: Normand Lapointe
- Parliamentary Secretary to the Minister of State (Mines)
  - 4 March 1980 – 30 September 1980: Russell MacLellan
  - 1 October 1980 – 30 September 1981: Jack Masters
  - 1 October 1981 – 30 September 1983: Marie Thérèse Killens
  - 1 March 1984 – 29 June 1984: Pierre Gimaïel
- Parliamentary Secretary to the Minister of State (Multiculturalism)
  - 4 March 1980 – 28 February 1982: Pierre Deniger
  - 1 March 1982 – 29 February 1984: Carlo Rossi
  - 1 March 1984 – 29 June 1984: Robert Gourd
- Parliamentary Secretary to the Minister of National Defence
  - 4 March 1980 – 28 February 1982: Ursula Appolloni
  - 1 March 1982 – 30 September 1982: George Henderson
  - 1 October 1982 – 29 June 1984: Stanley Hudecki
- Parliamentary Secretary to the Minister of National Health and Welfare
  - 4 March 1980 – 30 September 1980: David Weatherhead
  - 1 October 1980 – 30 September 1982: Doug Frith
  - 1 October 1982 – 29 February 1984: James Schroder
  - 1 March 1984 – 29 June 1984: Russell MacLellan
- Parliamentary Secretary to the Minister of National Revenue
  - 4 March 1980 – 30 September 1980: Yves Demers
  - 1 October 1980 – 30 September 1982: Claude Tessier
  - 1 October 1982 – 29 February 1984: Garnet Bloomfield
  - 1 March 1984 – 29 June 1984: Ken Robinson
- Parliamentary Secretary to the Postmaster General
  - 4 March 1980 – 30 September 1980: Aideen Nicholson
  - 1 October 1980 – 15 October 1981: Gary McCauley
- Parliamentary Secretary to the President of the Privy Council
  - 4 March 1980 – 30 September 1981: David Collenette
  - 1 October 1981 – 11 August 1983: David Smith
  - 11 September 1983 - 29 June 1984: John Leslie Evans
- Parliamentary Secretary to the Minister of Public Works
  - 4 March 1980 – 28 February 1982: Pierre Savard
  - 1 March 1982 – 30 September 1982: Henri Tousignant
  - 1 October 1982 – 29 June 1984: Jean-Claude Malépart
- Parliamentary Secretary to the Minister of Regional Economic Expansion
  - 4 March 1980 – 30 September 1980: Maurice Harquail
  - 1 October 1980 – 28 February 1982: Russell MacLellan
  - 1 October 1982 – 6 December 1983: André Maltais
- Parliamentary Secretary to the Minister of Regional Industrial Expansion
  - 7 December 1983 – 29 February 1984: Henri Tousignant
  - 1 March 1984 – 29 June 1984: René Cousineau
- Parliamentary Secretary to the Minister of State for Science and Technology
  - 4 March 1980 – 28 February 1982: Roger Simmons
  - 1 March 1982 – 30 September 1982: James Schroder
  - 1 October 1982 – 30 September 1983: Jim Peterson
  - 1 October 1983 – 29 June 1984: Rolland Dion
- Parliamentary Secretary to the Secretary of State of Canada
  - 4 March 1980 – 1 July 1981: Peter Stollery
  - 1 October 1981 – 30 September 1982: Jean Lapierre
  - 1 March 1984 – 29 June 1984: Robert Bockstael
- Parliamentary Secretary to the Minister of State (Small Businesses and Tourism)
  - 4 March 1980 – 28 February 1982: Ralph Ferguson
  - 1 March 1982 – 30 September 1982: David Berger
  - 1 October 1982 – 29 February 1984: René Cousineau
  - 1 March 1984 – 29 June 1984: Garnet Bloomfield
- Parliamentary Secretary to the Minister of State for Social Development
  - 4 March 1980 – 30 September 1980: Ken Robinson
  - 1 October 1980 – 30 September 1981: Ron Irwin
  - 1 October 1981 – 30 September 1982: Jim Peterson
- Parliamentary Secretary to the Solicitor General of Canada
  - 4 March 1980 – 28 February 1982: Céline Hervieux-Payette
  - 1 March 1982 – 29 February 1984: Alain Tardif
  - 1 March 1984 – 29 June 1984: Gaston Gourde
- Parliamentary Secretary to the Minister of State (Sports)
  - 4 March 1980 – 30 September 1980: Gilbert Parent
  - 1 October 1980 – 13 May 1981: Louis Desmarais
  - 26 May 1981 – 30 September 1981: Gilbert Parent
  - 1 October 1981 – 30 September 1982: Jean Lapierre
- Parliamentary Secretary to the Minister of Supply and Services
  - 4 March 1980 – 30 September 1980: Raymond Dupont
  - 1 October 1980 – 28 February 1982: Norm Kelly
  - 1 March 1982 – 30 September 1983: Maurice Bossy
  - 1 October 1983 – 29 June 1984: Paul-André Massé
- Parliamentary Secretary to the Minister of State (Trade)
  - 4 March 1980 – 30 September 1981: Claude-André Lachance
- Parliamentary Secretary to the Minister of Transport
  - 4 March 1980 – 30 September 1982: Robert Bockstael
  - 1 March 1982 – 29 February 1984: Jesse Flis
  - 1 March 1984 – 29 June 1984: Eva Côté
- Parliamentary Secretary to the President of the Treasury Board
  - 4 March 1980 – 30 September 1980: Robert Daudlin
  - 1 October 1980 – 21 September 1981: Serge Joyal
  - 1 October 1981 – 30 September 1982: Norm Kelly
  - 1 October 1982 – 29 February 1984: Peter Lang
  - 1 March 1984 – 29 June 1984: Maurice Foster
- Parliamentary Secretary to the Minister of Veterans Affairs
  - 4 March 1980 – 30 September 1982: John Campbell
  - 1 October 1982 – 29 February 1984: Roland de Corneille
  - 1 March 1984 – 29 June 1984: Jean-Louis Leduc
- Parliamentary Secretary to the Minister of State (Youth)
  - 1 March 1984 – 29 June 1984: Peter Lang

== Twenty-Third Canadian ministry ==
- Parliamentary Secretary to the Minister of Agriculture
  - 30 June 1984 – 9 July 1984: André Bachand
- Parliamentary Secretary to the Minister of Communications
  - 30 June 1984 – 9 July 1984: Jack Burghardt
- Parliamentary Secretary to the Minister of Consumer and Corporate Affairs
  - 30 June 1984 – 9 July 1984: Michel Veillette
- Parliamentary Secretary to the Deputy Prime Minister
  - 30 June 1984 – 9 July 1984: Suzanne Beauchamp-Niquet
- Parliamentary Secretary to the Minister of Employment and Immigration
  - 30 June 1984 – 9 July 1984: Jean-Guy Dubois
- Parliamentary Secretary to the Minister of Energy, Mines and Resources
  - 30 June 1984 – 9 July 1984: Len Hopkins
- Parliamentary Secretary to the Minister of the Environment
  - 30 June 1984 – 9 July 1984: Denis Éthier
- Parliamentary Secretary to the Minister of External Affairs
  - 30 June 1984 – 9 July 1984: Suzanne Beauchamp-Niquet
- Parliamentary Secretary to the Minister of Fisheries and Oceans
  - 30 June 1984 – 9 July 1984: Maurice Harquail
- Parliamentary Secretary to the Minister of Indian Affairs and Northern Development
  - 30 June 1984 – 9 July 1984: René Gingras
- Parliamentary Secretary to the Minister for International Trade
  - 30 June 1984 – 9 July 1984: Roderick Blaker
- Parliamentary Secretary to the Minister of Justice and Attorney General of Canada
  - 30 June 1984 – 9 July 1984: Al MacBain
- Parliamentary Secretary to the Minister of Labour
  - 30 June 1984 – 9 July 1984: Normand Lapointe
- Parliamentary Secretary to the Minister of State (Mines)
  - 30 June 1984 – 9 July 1984: Pierre Gimaïel
- Parliamentary Secretary to the Minister of State (Multiculturalism)
  - 30 June 1984 – 9 July 1984: Robert Gourd
- Parliamentary Secretary to the Minister of National Defence
  - 30 June 1984 – 9 July 1984: Stanley Hudecki
- Parliamentary Secretary to the Minister of National Health and Welfare
  - 30 June 1984 – 9 July 1984: Russell MacLellan
- Parliamentary Secretary to the Minister of National Revenue
  - 30 June 1984 – 9 July 1984: Ken Robinson
- Parliamentary Secretary to the President of the Privy Council
  - 30 June 1984 – 9 July 1984: John Leslie Evans
- Parliamentary Secretary to the Minister of Public Works
  - 30 June 1984 – 9 July 1984: Jean-Claude Malépart
- Parliamentary Secretary to the Minister of Regional Industrial Expansion
  - 30 June 1984 – 9 July 1984: René Cousineau
- Parliamentary Secretary to the Minister of State for Science and Technology
  - 30 June 1984 – 9 July 1984: Rolland Dion
- Parliamentary Secretary to the Secretary of State of Canada
  - 30 June 1984 – 9 July 1984: Robert Bockstael
- Parliamentary Secretary to the Minister of State (Small Businesses and Tourism)
  - 30 June 1984 – 9 July 1984: Garnet Bloomfield
- Parliamentary Secretary to the Solicitor General of Canada
  - 30 June 1984 – 9 July 1984: Gaston Gourde
- Parliamentary Secretary to the Minister of Supply and Services
  - 30 June 1984 – 9 July 1984: Paul-André Massé
- Parliamentary Secretary to the Minister of Transport
  - 30 June 1984 – 9 July 1984: Eva Côté
- Parliamentary Secretary to the President of the Treasury Board
  - 30 June 1984 – 9 July 1984: Maurice Foster
- Parliamentary Secretary to the Minister of Veterans Affairs
  - 30 June 1984 – 9 July 1984: Jean-Louis Leduc
- Parliamentary Secretary to the Minister of State (Youth)
  - 30 June 1984 – 9 July 1984: Peter Lang

== Twenty-Fourth Canadian ministry ==
- Parliamentary Secretary to the Prime Minister
  - 1 November 1984 – 10 March 1993: Lenard Gustafson
  - 11 March 1993 – 24 June 1993: André Harvey
- Parliamentary Secretary to the Deputy Prime Minister
  - 15 October 1986 – 14 October 1987: Doug Lewis
  - 15 October 1986 – 26 August 1987: Pierre Blais
  - 15 October 1987 – 4 April 1989: Richard Grisé
  - 15 October 1987 – 4 April 1989: Jim Hawkes
  - 5 April 1989 – 8 May 1991: Murray Cardiff
  - 8 May 1991 – 24 June 1993: Pierre H. Vincent
- Parliamentary Secretary to the Minister of Agriculture
  - 1 November 1984 – 14 October 1986: Pierre Blais
  - 15 October 1986 – 14 October 1987: Michel Champagne
  - 15 October 1987 – 4 April 1989: Lee Clark
  - 5 April 1989 – 24 June 1993: Murray Cardiff
- Parliamentary Secretary to the Minister of State (Agriculture)
  - 5 April 1989 – 4 April 1990: Benno Friesen
  - 8 May 1991 – 7 October 1991: Dorothy Dobbie
  - 8 October 1991 – 7 May 1992: Jim Edwards
  - 8 May 1992 – 24 June 1993: Dorothy Dobbie
- Parliamentary Secretary to the Minister for the Atlantic Canada Opportunities Agency
  - 8 May 1991 – 24 June 1993: Ross Belsher
- Parliamentary Secretary to the Minister of Communications
  - 1 November 1984 – 24 November 1985: Geoffrey Scott
  - 25 November 1985 – 14 October 1986: Jim Edwards
  - 15 October 1986 – 14 October 1987: Claudy Mailly
  - 15 October 1987 – 14 October 1988: Roger Clinch
  - 5 April 1989 – 14 January 1991: Jim Edwards
  - 31 January 1991 – 7 May 1991: Lee Richardson
  - 8 May 1991 – 24 June 1993: Nicole Roy-Arcelin
- Parliamentary Secretary to the Minister Responsible for Constitutional Affairs
  - 8 May 1991 – 24 June 1993: Jean-Guy Hudon
- Parliamentary Secretary to the Minister of Consumer and Corporate Affairs
  - 1 November 1984 – 14 October 1986: Bill Domm
  - 15 October 1986 – 14 October 1987: Gabrielle Bertrand
  - 15 October 1987 – 4 April 1989: Lise Bourgault
  - 5 April 1989 – 7 May 1991: Blaine Thacker
  - 8 May 1991 – 7 October 1991: Dorothy Dobbie
  - 8 October 1991 – 30 April 1992: Jim Edwards
  - 8 May 1992 – 24 June 1993: Dorothy Dobbie
- Parliamentary Secretary to the Deputy Leader of the Government in the House of Commons
  - 8 May 1991 – 24 June 1993: Marcel Tremblay
- Parliamentary Secretary to the Minister of Employment and Immigration
  - 1 November 1984 – 24 November 1985: Jean-Guy Hudon
  - 25 November 1985 – 15 October 1986: Gerry Weiner
  - 15 October 1986 – 12 August 1987: Gary Gurbin
  - 12 August 1987 – 4 April 1989: Benno Friesen
  - 5 April 1989 – 7 May 1991: Bill Kempling
  - 8 May 1991 – 24 June 1993: Jack Shields
- Parliamentary Secretary to the Minister of Energy, Mines and Resources
  - 1 November 1984 – 14 October 1986: John McDermid
  - 15 October 1986 – 4 April 1989: Jack Shields
  - 5 April 1989 – 24 June 1993: John MacDougall
- Parliamentary Secretary to the Minister of Environment
  - 1 November 1984 – 14 October 1986: Gary Gurbin
  - 15 October 1986 – 4 April 1989: Pauline Browes
  - 5 April 1989 – 24 June 1993: Lee Clark
- Parliamentary Secretary to the Minister of External Affairs
  - 1 November 1984 – 24 November 1985: Gerry Weiner
  - 25 November 1985 – 24 November 1986: Chuck Cook
  - 15 October 1986 – 4 April 1989: Jean-Guy Hudon
  - 5 April 1989 – 7 May 1991: Patrick Boyer
  - 8 May 1991 – 24 June 1993: Benno Friesen
- Parliamentary Secretary to the Minister for External Relations
  - 1 November 1984 – 24 November 1985: David Kilgour
  - 25 November 1985 – 24 November 1986: Jean-Guy Hudon
  - 15 October 1986 – 14 October 1987: Roger Clinch
  - 15 October 1987 – 4 April 1989: Michel Champagne
  - 8 May 1991 – 24 June 1993: Suzanne Duplessis
- Parliamentary Secretary to the Minister of Finance
  - 1 November 1984 – 24 November 1985: Claude Lanthier
  - 25 November 1985 – 3 January 1993: Pierre H. Vincent
  - 11 March 1993 – 24 June 1993: Marcel Tremblay
- Parliamentary Secretary to the Minister of State (Finance)
  - 7 September 1990 – 14 January 1991: Dave Worthy
  - 8 May 1991 – 24 June 1993: Bill Kempling
- Parliamentary Secretary to the Minister of State (Finance and Privatization)
  - 27 February 1991 – 24 June 1993: Peter McCreath
- Parliamentary Secretary to the Minister of Fisheries and Oceans
  - 1 November 1984 – 14 October 1986: Melbourne Gass
  - 15 October 1986 – 14 October 1988: Pat Binns
  - 5 April 1989 – 7 May 1991: Ross Reid
  - 8 May 1991 – 24 June 1993: Ross Belsher
- Parliamentary Secretary to the Minister of State (Fitness and Amateur Sport)
  - 22 April 1986 – 14 October 1986: Vincent Della Noce
  - 5 April 1989 – 4 April 1990: Michel Champagne
  - 8 May 1991 – 24 June 1993: Marcel Tremblay
- Parliamentary Secretary to the Minister of Forestry
  - 5 April 1990 – 24 June 1993: Michel Champagne
- Parliamentary Secretary to the Minister of State (Forestry)
  - 5 April 1989 – 4 April 1990: Michel Champagne
- Parliamentary Secretary to the Minister of State (Forestry and Mines)
  - 15 October 1987 – 11 August 1988: Lorne Greenaway
  - 12 August 1988 – 14 October 1988: Ted Schellenberg
- Parliamentary Secretary to the Minister of Indian Affairs and Northern Development
  - 1 November 1984 – 24 November 1985: Girve Fretz
  - 25 November 1985 – 14 October 1986: David Kilgour
  - 15 October 1986 – 11 August 1988: Stan Schellenberger
  - 12 August 1988 – 4 April 1989: Jim Edwards
  - 5 April 1989 – 7 May 1991: Dorothy Dobbie
  - 8 May 1991 – 24 June 1993: Ross Reid
- Parliamentary Secretary to the Minister of Industry, Science and Technology
  - 5 April 1990 – 25 June 1990: Benoît Tremblay
  - 7 September 1990 – 7 May 1991: André Plourde
  - 8 May 1991 – 22 March 1993: Charles Langlois
  - 23 March 1993 – 24 June 1993: Peter McCreath
- Parliamentary Secretary to the Minister for International Trade
  - 1 November 1984 – 31 October 1985: Stewart McInnes
  - 25 November 1985 – 14 October 1986: Monique Landry
  - 15 October 1986 – 15 September 1988: John McDermid
  - 16 September 1988 – 29 January 1989: William Winegard
  - 5 April 1989 – 7 May 1991: Jack Shields
  - 8 May 1991 – 10 March 1993: André Plourde
  - 11 March 1993 – 24 June 1993: Peter McCreath
- Parliamentary Secretary to the Minister of Justice and Attorney General of Canada
  - 1 November 1984 – 14 October 1986: Chris Speyer
  - 15 October 1986 – 14 October 1987: François Gérin
  - 5 April 1989 – 4 April 1990: Albert Cooper
  - 5 April 1989 – 24 June 1993: Rob Nicholson
- Parliamentary Secretary to the Minister of Labour
  - 1 November 1984 – 14 October 1988: Joseph Price
  - 5 April 1989 – 24 June 1993: Ken James
- Parliamentary Secretary to the Minister of State (Government House Leader)
  - 1 November 1984 – 26 February 1985: Paul Dick
- Parliamentary Secretary to the Leader of the Government in the House of Commons
  - 5 April 1989 – 4 April 1990: Rob Nicholson
  - 5 April 1989 – 7 May 1992: Albert Cooper
  - 1 May 1992 – 24 June 1993: Jim Edwards
- Parliamentary Secretary to the Minister of State (Mines)
  - 1 November 1984 – 24 November 1985: Frank Oberle
- Parliamentary Secretary to the Minister of State (Multiculturalism)
  - 15 October 1986 – 22 April 1987: Vincent Della Noce
- Parliamentary Secretary to the Minister of Multiculturalism and Citizenship
  - 8 May 1991 – 24 June 1993: Vincent Della Noce
- Parliamentary Secretary to the Minister of National Defence
  - 1 November 1984 – 14 October 1986: Robert Wenman
  - 15 October 1986 – 14 October 1988: Bud Bradley
  - 5 April 1989 – 7 May 1991: Jean-Guy Hudon
  - 8 May 1991 – 24 June 1993: Patrick Boyer
- Parliamentary Secretary to the Minister of National Health and Welfare
  - 1 November 1984 – 14 October 1986: Gabrielle Bertrand
  - 15 October 1986 – 4 April 1989: Monique Tardif
  - 5 April 1989 – 7 May 1991: Lise Bourgault
  - 8 May 1991 – 24 June 1993: Bobbie Sparrow
- Parliamentary Secretary to the Minister of National Revenue
  - 1 November 1984 – 24 November 1985: Pierre H. Vincent
  - 25 November 1985 – 14 October 1986: Bernard Valcourt
  - 15 October 1986 – 14 October 1987: Jennifer Cossitt
  - 15 October 1987 – 14 October 1988: Claudy Mailly
  - 5 April 1989 – 7 May 1991: Vincent Della Noce
  - 8 May 1991 – 24 June 1993: Barry Moore
- Parliamentary Secretary to the Minister of State (Privatization and Regulatory Affairs)
  - 7 September 1990 – 27 February 1991: Dave Worthy
- Parliamentary Secretary to the President of the Privy Council
  - 27 February 1985 – 24 November 1985: Paul Dick
  - 25 November 1985 – 14 October 1987: Doug Lewis
  - 15 October 1986 – 26 August 1987: Pierre Blais
  - 15 October 1987 – 4 April 1989: Jim Hawkes
  - 15 October 1987 – 4 April 1989: Richard Grisé
  - 5 April 1989 – 7 May 1991: Murray Cardiff
  - 8 May 1991 – 24 June 1993: Jean-Guy Hudon
- Parliamentary Secretary to the Minister of Public Works
  - 1 November 1984 – 14 October 1986: Ronald Stewart
  - 15 October 1986 – 14 October 1987: Claude Lanthier
  - 15 October 1987 – 15 September 1988: Shirley Martin
  - 16 September 1988 – 4 April 1989: Bill Kempling
  - 7 September 1990 – 7 May 1991: Nicole Roy-Arcelin
  - 8 May 1991 – 24 June 1993: Dave Worthy
- Parliamentary Secretary to the Minister of Regional Industrial Expansion
  - 1 November 1984 – 14 October 1986: Monique Tardif
  - 15 October 1986 – 4 April 1989: Michael Forrestall
  - 5 April 1989 – 4 April 1990: Benoît Tremblay
- Parliamentary Secretary to the Minister of State for Science and Technology
  - 1 November 1984 – 24 November 1985: Bernard Valcourt
  - 25 November 1985 – 14 October 1986: Claude Lanthier
  - 15 October 1986 – 14 October 1987: Gordon Towers
  - 15 October 1987 – 4 April 1989: Michael Forrestall
  - 15 October 1987 – 4 April 1990: Suzanne Duplessis
  - 5 April 1989 – 4 April 1990: Benoît Tremblay
- Parliamentary Secretary to the Minister for Science
  - 5 April 1990 – 7 May 1991: Suzanne Duplessis
  - 8 May 1991 – 24 June 1993: Bill Domm
- Parliamentary Secretary to the Secretary of State of Canada
  - 1 November 1984 – 24 November 1985: Monique Landry
  - 25 November 1985 – 14 October 1986: Geoffrey Scott
  - 15 October 1986 – 4 April 1989: Vincent Della Noce
  - 5 April 1989 – 31 March 1991: Pauline Browes
  - 8 May 1991 – 24 June 1993: Vincent Della Noce
- Parliamentary Secretary to the Solicitor General of Canada
  - 1 November 1984 – 14 October 1986: Gordon Towers
  - 15 October 1986 – 4 April 1989: Murray Cardiff
  - 5 April 1989 – 7 May 1991: Benno Friesen
  - 8 May 1991 – 24 June 1993: Monique Tardif
- Parliamentary Secretary to the Minister of Supply and Services
  - 1 November 1984 – 14 October 1986: Bud Bradley
  - 15 October 1986 – 19 January 1988: Ronald Stewart
  - 13 April 1988 – 4 April 1989: Ken James
  - 5 April 1989 – 7 May 1991: Monique Tardif
  - 8 May 1991 – 14 November 1991: Lise Bourgault
  - 8 May 1992 – 24 June 1993: Jean-Guy Guilbault
- Parliamentary Secretary to the Minister of Transport
  - 1 November 1984 – 14 October 1986: Michael Forrestall
  - 15 October 1986 – 6 April 1987: David Kilgour
  - 7 April 1987 – 14 October 1988: Blaine Thacker
  - 5 April 1989 – 7 May 1991: Ross Belsher
  - 8 May 1991 – 24 June 1993: Lee Richardson
- Parliamentary Secretary to the President of the Treasury Board
  - 1 November 1984 – 24 November 1985: Doug Lewis
  - 25 November 1985 – 14 October 1986: Paul Dick
  - 15 October 1986 – 14 October 1987: Chuck Cook
  - 5 April 1989 – 31 March 1991: Howard Crosby
  - 27 February 1991 – 8 May 1991: Dave Worthy
  - 8 May 1991 – 24 June 1993: Bill Kempling
- Parliamentary Secretary to the Minister of Veterans Affairs
  - 1 November 1984 – 6 July 1988: A. Daniel McKenzie
  - 7 July 1988 - 14 October 1988: Charles-André Hamelin
  - 5 April 1989 – 24 June 1993: Bill C. Scott
- Parliamentary Secretary to the Minister of State (Youth)
  - 8 May 1991 – 24 June 1993: Marcel Tremblay

== Twenty-Fifth Canadian ministry ==
- Parliamentary Secretary to the Prime Minister
  - 1 September 1993 – 26 October 1993: Bill Attewell
- Parliamentary Secretary to the Minister of Agriculture
  - 1 September 1993 – 26 October 1993: Murray Cardiff
- Parliamentary Secretary to the Deputy Prime Minister, Industry, Science and Technology and Consumer and Corporate Affairs
  - 1 September 1993 – 26 October 1993: Patrick Boyer
  - 1 September 1993 – 26 October 1993: Ken Hughes
- Parliamentary Secretary to the Minister of Employment and Immigration and Labour
  - 1 September 1993 – 26 October 1993: André Plourde
  - 1 September 1993 – 26 October 1993: Jack Shields
- Parliamentary Secretary to the Minister of Energy, Mines and Resources and Forestry
  - 1 September 1993 – 26 October 1993: Michel Champagne
- Parliamentary Secretary to the Minister of Environment
  - 1 September 1993 – 26 October 1993: Dorothy Dobbie
- Parliamentary Secretary to the Minister of External Affairs
  - 1 September 1993 – 26 October 1993: Ken James
  - 1 September 1993 – 26 October 1993: Suzanne Duplessis
- Parliamentary Secretary to the Minister of Finance
  - 1 September 1993 – 26 October 1993: Jean-Marc Robitaille
- Parliamentary Secretary to the Minister of Fisheries and Oceans and Atlantic Canada Opportunities Agency
  - 1 September 1993 – 26 October 1993: Ross Belsher
- Parliamentary Secretary to the Minister of Forestry
  - 1 September 1993 – 26 October 1993: Michel Champagne
- Parliamentary Secretary to the Minister of Indian Affairs and Northern Development
  - 1 September 1993 – 26 October 1993: André Harvey
- Parliamentary Secretary to the Minister for International Trade
  - 1 September 1993 – 26 October 1993: Dave Worthy
- Parliamentary Secretary to the Minister of Justice and Attorney General of Canada and Privy Council
  - 1 September 1993 – 26 October 1993: Marcel Tremblay
- Parliamentary Secretary to the Minister of Multiculturalism and Citizenship
  - 1 September 1993 – 26 October 1993: Vincent Della Noce
- Parliamentary Secretary to the Minister of National Defence
  - 1 September 1993 – 26 October 1993: Jean-Pierre Blackburn
- Parliamentary Secretary to the Minister of National Health and Welfare
  - 1 September 1993 – 26 October 1993: Monique Tardif
- Parliamentary Secretary to the Minister of National Revenue
  - 1 September 1993 – 26 October 1993: Barry Moore
- Parliamentary Secretary to the Minister of Science
  - 1 September 1993 – 26 October 1993: Bill Domm
- Parliamentary Secretary to the Secretary of State of Canada and Communications
  - 1 September 1993 – 26 October 1993: Nicole Roy-Arcelin
- Parliamentary Secretary to the Solicitor General of Canada and Leader of the Government in the House of Commons
  - 1 September 1993 – 26 October 1993: Charles Langlois
- Parliamentary Secretary to the Minister of Supply and Services and Public Works
  - 1 September 1993 – 26 October 1993: Jean-Guy Guilbault
- Parliamentary Secretary to the Minister of Transport
  - 1 September 1993 – 26 October 1993: Lee Richardson
- Parliamentary Secretary to the President of the Treasury Board
  - 1 September 1993 – 26 October 1993: Barbara Greene

== Twenty-Sixth Canadian ministry ==
- Parliamentary Secretary to the Prime Minister
  - 6 December 1993 – 22 February 1996: Jean Augustine
  - 23 February 1996 – 15 July 1998: Rey Pagtakhan
  - 16 July 1998 – 31 August 2000: Gar Knutson
  - 1 September 2000 – 12 January 2003: Joe Jordan
  - 13 January 2003 – 11 December 2003: Rodger Cuzner
- Parliamentary Secretary to the Deputy Prime Minister
  - 6 December 1993 – 22 February 1996: Clifford Lincoln
  - 23 February 1996 – 9 July 1997: Guy Arseneault
  - 8 April 2002 – 6 August 2002: Steve Mahoney
- Parliamentary Secretary to the Minister of Agriculture (Agriculture and Agri-Food)
  - 6 December 1993 – 11 January 1995: Lyle Vanclief
  - Became Parliamentary Secretary to the Minister of Agriculture and Agri-Food.
- Parliamentary Secretary to the Minister of Agriculture and Agri-Food
  - Was Parliamentary Secretary to the Minister of Agriculture (Agriculture and Agri-Food).
  - 12 January 1995 – 22 February 1996: Lyle Vanclief
  - 23 February 1996 – 9 July 1997: Jerry Pickard
  - 10 July 1997 – 15 July 1998: John Harvard
  - 16 July 1998 – 31 August 2000: Joe McGuire
  - 1 September 2000 – 12 January 2003: Larry McCormick
  - 13 January 2003 – 11 December 2003: Claude Duplain
- Parliamentary Secretary to the Minister of Atlantic Canada Opportunities Agency
  - 23 February 1996 – 9 July 1997: Morris Bodnar
- Parliamentary Secretary to the Minister of Canadian Heritage
  - Was Parliamentary Secretary to the Minister of Communications (Canadian Heritage) and Parliamentary Secretary to the Minister of Multiculturalism and Citizenship (Canadian Heritage).
  - 12 July 1996 – 9 July 1997: Guy Arseneault
  - 10 July 1997 – 15 July 1998: John Godfrey
  - 16 July 1998 – 31 August 2000: Mauril Bélanger
  - 1 September 2000 – 12 January 2003: Sarmite Bulte
  - 13 January 2003 – 11 December 2003: Carole-Marie Allard
- Parliamentary Secretary to the Secretary of State of Canada (Citizenship and Immigration)
  - 6 December 1993 – 22 June 1994: Mary Clancy
  - Became Parliamentary Secretary to the Minister of Citizenship and Immigration.
- Parliamentary Secretary to the Minister of Citizenship and Immigration
  - Was Parliamentary Secretary to the Secretary of State of Canada (Citizenship and Immigration)
  - 23 June 1994 – 22 February 1996: Mary Clancy
  - 23 February 1996 – 15 July 1998: Maria Minna
  - 16 July 1998 – 31 August 2000: Andrew Telegdi
  - 1 September 2000 – 12 January 2003: Mark Assad
  - 13 January 2003 – 11 December 2003: Sarkis Assadourian
- Parliamentary Secretary to the Minister of Communications (Canadian Heritage)
  - 6 December 1993 – 22 February 1996: Albina Guarnieri
  - 23 February 1996 – 11 July 1996: Guy Arseneault
  - Became Parliamentary Secretary to the Minister of Canadian Heritage.
- Parliamentary Secretary to the Minister of Consumer and Corporate Affairs (Industry)
  - 6 December 1993 – 28 March 1995: Dennis Mills
  - Became Parliamentary Secretary to the Minister of Industry.
- Parliamentary Secretary to the Minister of Employment and Immigration (Human Resources Development)
  - 6 December 1993 – 22 February 1996: Maurizio Bevilacqua
  - 23 February 1996 – 9 July 1997: Bob Nault
- Parliamentary Secretary to the Minister of Energy, Mines and Resources (Natural Resources)
  - 6 December 1993 – 11 January 1995: George Rideout
  - Became Parliamentary Secretary to the Minister of Natural Resources.
- Parliamentary Secretary to the Minister of Environment
  - 6 December 1993 – 22 February 1996: Clifford Lincoln
  - 23 February 1996 – 15 July 1998: Karen Kraft Sloan
  - 16 July 1998 – 31 August 2000: Paddy Torsney
  - 1 September 2000 – 12 January 2003: Karen Redman
  - 13 January 2003 – 11 December 2003: Alan Tonks
- Parliamentary Secretary to the Minister of Finance
  - 6 December 1993 – 22 February 1996: David Walker
  - 23 February 1996 – 9 July 1997: Barry Campbell
  - 10 July 1997 – 31 August 1999: Tony Valeri
  - 1 September 1999 – 12 September 2001: Roy Cullen
  - 13 September 2001 – 14 January 2002: John McCallum
  - 19 February 2002 – 11 December 2003: Bryon Wilfert
- Parliamentary Secretary to the Minister of Fisheries and Oceans
  - 6 December 1993 – 22 February 1996: Herb Dhaliwal
  - 23 February 1996 – 9 July 1997: Ted McWhinney
  - 10 July 1997 – 31 August 1999: Wayne Easter
  - 1 September 1999 – 12 September 2001: Lawrence O'Brien
  - 13 September 2001 – 11 December 2003: Georges Farrah
- Parliamentary Secretary to the Secretary of State for External Affairs (Foreign Affairs)
  - 6 December 1993 – 12 May 1995: Jesse Flis
  - Became Parliamentary Secretary to the Minister of Foreign Affairs.
- Parliamentary Secretary to the Minister of Foreign Affairs
  - Was Parliamentary Secretary to the Secretary of State for External Affairs (Foreign Affairs).
  - 13 May 1995 – 22 February 1996: Jesse Flis
  - 23 February 1996 – 9 July 1997: Francis LeBlanc
  - 10 July 1997 – 15 July 1998: Ted McWhinney
  - 16 July 1998 – 31 August 1999: Julian Reed
  - 1 September 1999 – 12 September 2001: Denis Paradis
  - 13 September 2001 – 11 December 2003: Aileen Carroll
- Parliamentary Secretary to the Minister of Forestry (Natural Resources)
  - 6 December 1993 – 11 January 1995: George Rideout
  - Became Parliamentary Secretary to the Minister of Natural Resources.
- Parliamentary Secretary to the Minister responsible for La Francophonie
  - 10 July 1997 – 22 November 1998: Claudette Bradshaw
  - 26 January 1999 – 15 July 1999: Denis Paradis
- Parliamentary Secretary to the Minister of Health
  - Was Parliamentary Secretary to the Minister of National Health and Welfare (Health).
  - 22 February 1997 – 15 July 1998: Joe Volpe
  - 16 July 1998 – 15 July 1999: Elinor Caplan
  - 1 September 1999 – 12 September 2001: Yvon Charbonneau
  - 13 September 2001 – 11 December 2003: Jeannot Castonguay
- Parliamentary Secretary to the Minister of Human Resources Development
  - 12 July 1996 – 9 July 1997: George Proud
  - 10 July 1997 – 15 July 1998: Bob Nault
  - 16 July 1998 – 31 August 2000: Bonnie Brown
  - 1 September 2000 – 12 January 2003: Raymonde Folco
  - 13 January 2003 – 11 December 2003: Diane St-Jacques
- Parliamentary Secretary to the Minister of Indian Affairs and Northern Development
  - 6 December 1993 – 22 February 1996: Jack Anawak
  - 23 February 1996 – 15 July 1998: Bernard Patry
  - 16 July 1998 – 31 August 2000: David Iftody
  - 1 September 2000 – 12 January 2003: John Baird Finlay
  - 13 January 2003 – 11 December 2003: Charles Hubbard
- Parliamentary Secretary to the Minister of Industry
  - Was Parliamentary Secretary to the Minister of Consumer and Corporate Affairs (Industry) and Parliamentary Secretary to the Minister of Industry, Science and Technology (Industry).
  - 29 March 1995 – 22 February 1996: Dennis Mills
  - 23 February 1996 – 9 July 1997: Morris Bodnar
  - 10 July 1997 – 31 August 1999: Walt Lastewka
  - 1 September 1999 – 12 September 2001: John Cannis
  - 13 September 2001 – 14 January 2002: Claude Drouin
  - 18 February 2002 – 12 December 2003: Serge Marcil
- Parliamentary Secretary to the Minister of Industry, Science and Technology (Industry)
  - 6 December 1993 – 28 March 1995: Dennis Mills
  - Became Parliamentary Secretary to the Minister of Industry.
- Parliamentary Secretary to the Minister of International Cooperation
  - 23 February 1996 – 9 July 1997: John Godfrey
  - 10 July 1997 – 22 November 1998: Claudette Bradshaw
  - 26 January 1999 – 31 August 1999: Denis Paradis
  - 1 September 1999 – 12 September 2001: Eugène Bellemare
  - 13 September 2001 – 12 January 2003: Marlene Jennings
  - 13 January 2003 – 11 December 2003: André Harvey
- Parliamentary Secretary to the Minister of International Trade
  - 6 December 1993 – 22 February 1996: Mac Harb
  - 23 February 1996 – 9 July 1997: Ron MacDonald
  - 10 July 1997 – 15 July 1998: Julian Reed
  - 16 July 1998 – 31 August 2000: Bob Speller
  - 1 September 2000 – 12 January 2003: Pat O'Brien
  - 13 January 2003 – 11 December 2003: Murray Calder
- Parliamentary Secretary to the Minister of Justice and Attorney General of Canada
  - 6 December 1993 – 22 February 1996: Russell MacLellan
  - 23 February 1996 – 9 July 1997: Gordon Kirkby
  - 10 July 1997 – 31 August 1999: Eleni Bakopanos
  - 1 September 1999 – 12 September 2001: John David Maloney
  - 13 September 2001 – 14 January 2002: Stephen Owen
  - 18 February 2002 – 12 December 2003: Paul Macklin
- Parliamentary Secretary to the Minister of Labour
  - Was Parliamentary Secretary to the Minister of Labour (Human Resources Development).
  - 1 September 1999 – 12 September 2001: Judi Longfield
  - 13 September 2001 – 11 December 2003: Gurbax Singh Malhi
- Parliamentary Secretary to the Minister of Labour (Human Resources Development)
  - 6 December 1993 – 5 September 1995: Maurizio Bevilacqua
  - 6 September 1995 – 22 February 1996: Bob Nault
  - 23 February 1996 – 9 July 1997: George Proud
  - 10 July 1997 – 31 August 1999: Brenda Chamberlain
- Became Parliamentary Secretary to the Minister of Labour.
- Parliamentary Secretary to the Minister of Multiculturalism and Citizenship (Canadian Heritage)
  - 6 December 1993 – 22 February 1996: Albina Guarnieri
  - 23 February 1996 – 11 July 1996: Guy Arseneault
  - Became Parliamentary Secretary to the Minister of Canadian Heritage.
- Parliamentary Secretary to the Leader of the Government in the House of Commons
  - 6 December 1993 – 22 February 1996: Peter Milliken
  - 23 February 1996 – 9 July 1997: Paul Zed
  - 10 July 1997 – 31 August 1999: Peter Adams
  - 1 September 1999 – 12 September 2001: Derek Lee
  - 13 September 2001 – 11 December 2003: Geoff Regan
- Parliamentary Secretary to the Minister of National Defence
  - 6 December 1993 – 22 February 1996: Fred Mifflin
  - 23 February 1996 – 15 July 1998: John Richardson
  - 16 July 1998 – 31 August 2000: Robert Bertrand
  - 1 September 2000 – 21 December 2000: Hec Clouthier
  - 22 December 2000 – 12 January 2003: John O'Reilly
  - 13 January 2003 – 11 December 2003: Dominic LeBlanc
- Parliamentary Secretary to the Minister of National Health and Welfare (Health)
  - 6 December 1993 – 22 February 1996: Hedy Fry
  - 23 February 1996 – 21 February 1997: Joe Volpe
  - Became Parliamentary Secretary to the Minister of Health.
- Parliamentary Secretary to the Minister of National Revenue
  - 6 December 1993 – 22 February 1996: Susan Whelan
  - 23 February 1996 – 15 July 1998: Sue Barnes
  - 16 July 1998 – 31 August 2000: Beth Phinney
  - 1 September 2000 – 12 January 2003: Sophia Leung
  - 13 January 2003 – 11 December 2003: Colleen Beaumier
- Parliamentary Secretary to the Minister of Natural Resources
  - Parliamentary Secretary to the Minister of Energy, Mines and Resources (Natural Resources) and Parliamentary Secretary to the Minister of Forestry (Natural Resources).
  - 12 January 1995 – 22 February 1996: George Rideout
  - 23 February 1996 – 9 July 1997: Marlene Cowling
  - 10 July 1997 – 31 August 1999: Gerry Byrne
  - 1 September 1999 – 31 August 2000: Brent St. Denis
  - 1 September 2000 – 12 January 2003: Benoît Serré
  - 13 January 2003 – 11 December 2003: Nancy Karetak-Lindell
- Parliamentary Secretary to the President of the Privy Council
  - 6 December 1993 – 22 February 1996: John English
  - Became Parliamentary Secretary to the President of the Queen's Privy Council for Canada and Minister of Intergovernmental Affairs.
- Parliamentary Secretary to the President of the Queen's Privy Council for Canada and Minister of Intergovernmental Affairs
  - Was Parliamentary Secretary to the President of the Privy Council.
  - 23 February 1996 – 15 July 1998: Paul DeVillers
  - 16 July 1998 – 31 August 2000: Reg Alcock
  - 1 September 2000 – 12 January 2003: Bill Matthews
  - 13 January 2003 – 11 December 2003: Joe Peschisolido
- Parliamentary Secretary to the Minister of Public Works (Public Works and Government Services)
  - 6 December 1993 – 5 December 1994: Ron Duhamel
  - 6 December 1994 – 22 February 1996: Réginald Bélair
  - 23 February 1996 – 21 February 1997: John Harvard
  - Became Parliamentary Secretary to the Minister of Public Works and Government Services.
- Parliamentary Secretary to the Minister of Public Works and Government Services
  - Was Parliamentary Secretary to the Minister of Public Works (Public Works and Government Services) and Parliamentary Secretary to the Minister of Supply and Services (Public Works and Government Services).
  - 22 February 1997 – 9 July 1997: John Harvard
  - 10 July 1997 – 15 July 1998: Jerry Pickard
  - 16 July 1998 – 31 August 2000: Carolyn Parrish
  - 1 September 2000 – 12 January 2003: Paul Szabo
  - 13 January 2003 – 11 December 2003: Judy Sgro
- Parliamentary Secretary to the Solicitor General of Canada
  - 6 December 1993 – 22 February 1996: Patrick Gagnon
  - 23 February 1996 – 15 July 1998: Nick Discepola
  - 16 July 1998 – 31 August 2000: Jacques Saada
  - 1 September 2000 – 12 January 2003: Lynn Myers
  - 13 January 2003 – 11 December 2003: Marlene Jennings
- Parliamentary Secretary to the Minister of Supply and Services (Public Works and Government Services)
  - 6 December 1993 – 5 December 1994: Ron Duhamel
  - 6 December 1994 – 22 February 1996: Réginald Bélair
  - 23 February 1996 – 21 February 1997: John Harvard
  - Became Parliamentary Secretary to the Minister of Public Works and Government Services.
- Parliamentary Secretary to the Minister of Transport
  - 6 December 1993 – 22 February 1996: Joe Fontana
  - 23 February 1996 – 15 July 1998: Stan Keyes
  - 16 July 1998 – 31 August 2000: Stan Dromisky
  - 1 September 2000 – 12 September 2001: Brent St. Denis
  - 13 September 2001 – 12 January 2003: André Harvey
  - 13 January 2003 – 11 December 2003: Marcel Proulx
- Parliamentary Secretary to the Minister of Transport for Crown Corporations
  - 7 August 2002 – 10 April 2003: Steve Mahoney
- Parliamentary Secretary to the President of the Treasury Board
  - 6 December 1993 – 26 September 1994: Marlene Catterall
  - 6 December 1994 – 22 February 1996: Ron Duhamel
  - 23 February 1996 – 15 July 1998: Ovid Jackson
  - 16 July 1998 – 31 August 2000: Tony Ianno
  - 1 September 2000 – 12 January 2003: Alex Shepherd
  - 13 January 2003 – 11 December 2003: Tony Tirabassi
- Parliamentary Secretary to the Minister of Veterans Affairs
  - 6 December 1993 – 22 February 1996: Fred Mifflin
  - 23 February 1996 – 9 July 1997: John Richardson
  - 10 July 1997 – 15 July 1998: George Proud
  - 16 July 1998 – 31 August 2000: Bob Wood
  - 1 September 2000 – 12 January 2003: Carmen Provenzano
  - 13 January 2003 – 11 December 2003: Ivan Grose
- Parliamentary Secretary to the Minister of Western Economic Diversification
  - 23 February 1996 – 9 July 1997: Morris Bodnar

== Twenty-Seventh Canadian ministry ==
- Parliamentary Secretary to the Prime Minister
  - 12 May 2005 – 6 October 2005: Paul DeVillers
  - 7 October 2005 – 5 February 2006: Navdeep Bains
- Parliamentary Secretary to the Prime Minister with special emphasis on Aboriginal Affairs
  - 30 January 2004 – 19 July 2004: Andrew Telegdi
- Parliamentary Secretary to the Prime Minister with special emphasis on Canada–U.S. relations
  - 12 December 2003 – 19 July 2004: Scott Brison
  - 20 July 2004 – 6 October 2005: Marlene Jennings
- Parliamentary Secretary to the Prime Minister with special emphasis on Cities
  - 12 December 2003 – 19 July 2004: John Godfrey
- Parliamentary Secretary to the Prime Minister with special emphasis on Rural Communities
  - 20 July 2004 – 5 February 2006: Claude Drouin
- Parliamentary Secretary to the Prime Minister with special emphasis on Science and Small Business
  - 12 December 2003 – 19 July 2004: Joe Fontana
- Parliamentary Secretary to the Deputy Leader of the Government in the House of Commons, Minister responsible for Official Languages and Minister responsible for Democratic Reform
  - 20 July 2004 – 19 July 2005: Raymond Simard
- Parliamentary Secretary to the Deputy Prime Minister and Minister of Public Safety and Emergency Preparedness with special emphasis on Emergency Preparedness
  - 12 December 2003 – 19 July 2004: Yvon Charbonneau
- Parliamentary Secretary to the Deputy Prime Minister and Minister of Public Safety and Emergency Preparedness with special emphasis on Border Transit
  - 12 December 2003 – 19 July 2004: Jerry Pickard
- Parliamentary Secretary to the Minister of Agriculture and Agri-Food with special emphasis on Agri-Food
  - 12 December 2003 – 19 July 2004: Mark Eyking
- Parliamentary Secretary to the Minister of Agriculture and Agri-Food with special emphasis on Rural Development
  - 12 December 2003 – 19 July 2004: Georges Farrah
  - 20 July 2004 – 5 February 2006: Wayne Easter
- Parliamentary Secretary to the Minister of Canadian Heritage
  - 20 July 2004 – 5 February 2006: Sarmite Bulte
- Parliamentary Secretary to the Minister of Canadian Heritage and Minister responsible for the Status of Women with special emphasis on status of women
  - 7 October 2005 – 5 February 2006: Anita Neville
- Parliamentary Secretary to the Minister of Citizenship and Immigration
  - 20 July 2004 – 5 February 2006: Hedy Fry
- Parliamentary Secretary to the Minister of Citizenship and Immigration with special emphasis on Foreign Credentials
  - 12 December 2003 – 19 July 2004: Hedy Fry
- Parliamentary Secretary to the Minister of the Environment
  - 20 July 2004 – 5 February 2006: Bryon Wilfert
- Parliamentary Secretary to the Minister of the Environment with special emphasis on Parks
  - 12 December 2003 – 19 July 2004: Serge Marcil
- Parliamentary Secretary to the Minister of Finance
  - 20 July 2004 – 5 February 2006: John McKay
- Parliamentary Secretary to the Minister of Finance with special emphasis on Public Private Partnerships
  - 12 December 2003 – 19 July 2004: John McKay
- Parliamentary Secretary to the Minister of Fisheries and Oceans
  - 20 July 2004 – 5 February 2006: Shawn Murphy
- Parliamentary Secretary to the Minister of Fisheries and Oceans with special emphasis on the Oceans Action Plan
  - 12 December 2003 – 19 July 2004: Shawn Murphy
- Parliamentary Secretary to the Minister of Foreign Affairs
  - 20 July 2004 – 5 February 2006: Dan McTeague
- Parliamentary Secretary to the Minister of Foreign Affairs with special emphasis on Canadians Abroad
  - 12 December 2003 – 19 July 2004: Dan McTeague
- Parliamentary Secretary to the Minister of Health
  - 20 July 2004 – 5 February 2006: Robert Thibault
- Parliamentary Secretary to the Minister of Health with special emphasis on Drug Review Agency
  - 12 December 2003 – 19 July 2004: Gerry Byrne
- Parliamentary Secretary to the Minister of Human Resources and Skills Development
  - 20 July 2004 – 19 July 2005: Peter Adams
  - 20 July 2004 – 29 May 2005: Gurbax Singh Malhi
  - 7 October 2005 – 5 February 2006: Peter Adams
- Parliamentary Secretary to the Minister of Human Resources and Skills Development with special emphasis on the Internationally Trained Workers Initiative
  - 20 July 2004 – 5 February 2006: Hedy Fry
- Parliamentary Secretary to the Minister of Human Resources and Skills Development with special emphasis on Social Economy
  - 12 December 2003 – 19 July 2004: Eleni Bakopanos
- Parliamentary Secretary to the Minister of Human Resources and Skills Development with special emphasis on Student Loans
  - 12 December 2003 – 19 July 2004: Paul Bonwick
- Parliamentary Secretary to the Minister of Human Resources and Skills Development and Minister responsible for Democratic Renewal
  - 30 May 2005 – 6 October 2005: Gurbax Singh Malhi
  - 20 July 2005 – 6 October 2005: Peter Adams
  - 7 October 2005 – 5 February 2006: Jim Karygiannis
- Parliamentary Secretary to the Minister of Indian Affairs and Northern Development with special emphasis on Northern Economic Development
  - 12 December 2003 – 19 July 2004: Larry Bagnell
- Parliamentary Secretary to the Minister of Indian Affairs and Northern Development and Federal Interlocutor for Métis and Non-Status Indians
  - 20 July 2004 – 5 February 2006: Sue Barnes
- Parliamentary Secretary to the Minister of Industry
  - 20 July 2004 – 5 February 2006: Jerry Pickard
- Parliamentary Secretary to the Minister of Industry with special emphasis on Entrepreneurs and New Canadians
  - 12 December 2003 – 19 July 2004: Gurbax Singh Malhi
- Parliamentary Secretary to the Minister of Industry, with special emphasis on Women Entrepreneurs
  - 19 October 2005 – 5 February 2006: Sarmite Bulte
- Parliamentary Secretary to the Minister of Intergovernmental Affairs
  - 20 July 2004 – 5 February 2006: Gerry Byrne
- Parliamentary Secretary to the Minister for Internal Trade, Deputy Leader of the Government in the House of Commons and Minister responsible for Official Languages
  - 20 July 2005 – 5 February 2006: Raymond Simard
- Parliamentary Secretary to the Minister for International Cooperation
  - 20 July 2004 – 5 February 2006: Paddy Torsney
- Parliamentary Secretary to the Minister for International Trade with special emphasis on Emerging Markets
  - 20 July 2004 – 5 February 2006: Mark Eyking
- Parliamentary Secretary to the Minister for International Trade with special emphasis on Resource Promotion
  - 12 December 2003 – 6 May 2004: John Harvard
- Parliamentary Secretary to the Minister of Justice and Attorney General of Canada
  - 20 July 2004 – 5 February 2006: Paul Macklin
- Parliamentary Secretary to the Minister of Justice and Attorney General of Canada with special emphasis on Judicial Transparency and Aboriginal Justice
  - 12 December 2003 – 19 July 2004: Sue Barnes
- Parliamentary Secretary to the Minister of Labour and Housing
  - 20 July 2004 – 5 February 2006: Judi Longfield
- Parliamentary Secretary to the Leader of the Government in the House of Commons
  - 20 July 2004 – 5 February 2006: Dominic LeBlanc
- Parliamentary Secretary to the Leader of the Government in the House of Commons with special emphasis on Democratic Reform
  - 12 December 2003 – 19 July 2004: Roger Gallaway
- Parliamentary Secretary to the Minister of National Defence
  - 20 July 2004 – 5 February 2006: Keith Martin
- Parliamentary Secretary to the Minister of National Defence with special emphasis on the Role of the Reserves
  - 12 December 2003 – 19 July 2004: David Price
- Parliamentary Secretary to the Minister of National Revenue
  - 7 July 2005 – 5 February 2006: Gurbax Singh Malhi
- Parliamentary Secretary to the Minister of Natural Resources
  - 20 July 2004 – 5 February 2006: Larry Bagnell
- Parliamentary Secretary to the Minister of Natural Resources with special emphasis on Development of Value-Added Industries
  - 12 December 2003 – 19 July 2004: André Harvey
- Parliamentary Secretary to the Minister of Public Safety and Emergency Preparedness
  - 20 July 2004 – 5 February 2006: Roy Cullen
- Parliamentary Secretary to the Minister of Public Works and Government Services
  - 20 July 2004 – 5 February 2006: Walt Lastewka
- Parliamentary Secretary to the Minister of Public Works and Government Services with special emphasis on Procurement Review
  - 12 December 2003 – 19 July 2004: Walt Lastewka
- Parliamentary Secretary to the Minister of Social Development with special emphasis on Social Economy
  - 20 July 2004 – 5 February 2006: Eleni Bakopanos
- Parliamentary Secretary to the Minister of Transport
  - 20 July 2004 – 6 October 2005: Jim Karygiannis
  - 7 October 2005 – 5 February 2006: Charles Hubbard
- Parliamentary Secretary to the Minister of Transport with special emphasis on Transport and Environment
  - 12 December 2003 – 19 July 2004: Jim Karygiannis
- Parliamentary Secretary to the Minister responsible for the Status of Women
  - 20 July 2004 – 5 February 2006: Sarmite Bulte
- Parliamentary Secretary to the President of the Queen's Privy Council for Canada with special emphasis on Public Service Reform and Métis and Non-Status Indians
  - 12 December 2003 – 19 July 2004: Brenda Chamberlain
- Parliamentary Secretary to the President of the Treasury Board with special emphasis on Regulatory Reform
  - 12 December 2003 – 19 July 2004: Joe Jordan
- Parliamentary Secretary to the President of the Treasury Board and Minister responsible for the Canadian Wheat Board
  - 20 July 2004 – 5 February 2006: Diane Marleau

== Twenty-Eighth Canadian ministry ==
- Parliamentary Secretary to the Prime Minister
  - 7 February 2006 – 4 January 2007: Jason Kenney
  - 7 February 2006 – 7 September 2008: Sylvie Boucher (La Francophonie)
  - 7 November 2008 – 26 March 2011: Pierre Poilievre
  - 25 May 2011 – 19 September 2013: Dean Del Mastro
  - 19 September 2013 – 19 October 2015: Jacques Gourde
  - 19 September 2013 – 19 October 2015: Paul Calandra (Intergovernmental Affairs)
- Parliamentary Secretary to the Minister of Agriculture and Agri-Food and Minister for the Canadian Wheat Board
  - 7 February 2006 – 24 January 2007: Jacques Gourde
  - 7 February 2006 – 19 September 2013: David Anderson
  - 9 October 2007 – 7 September 2008: Guy Lauzon
  - 7 November 2008 – 22 January 2015: Pierre Lemieux
  - 22 January 2015 – 19 October 2015: Gerald Keddy
- Parliamentary Secretary (for the Canadian Wheat Board) to the Minister of Agriculture and Agri-Food and Minister for the Canadian Wheat Board
  - 7 February 2006 – 19 September 2013: David Anderson
- Parliamentary Secretary to the Minister for the Atlantic Canada Opportunities Agency
  - 9 October 2007 – 20 March 2008: Gerald Keddy
- Parliamentary Secretary to the Minister for the purposes of the Atlantic Canada Opportunities Agency Act
  - 25 May 2011 - 19 October 2015: Gerald Keddy
- Parliamentary Secretary to the Minister of Canadian Heritage
  - 7 February 2006 – 7 September 2008: Jim Abbott
  - 9 October 2007 – 26 March 2011: Sylvie Boucher
  - 9 October 2007 – 7 September 2008: Pierre Lemieux
  - 7 November 2008 – 26 March 2011: Dean Del Mastro
  - 7 November 2008 – 31 August 2010: Shelly Glover
  - 31 August 2010 – 30 January 2011: Greg Rickford
  - 30 January 2011 – 19 October 2015: Jacques Gourde
  - 25 May 2011 – 19 September 2013: Paul Calandra
  - 19 September 2013 – 19 October 2015: Rick Dykstra
- Parliamentary Secretary to the Minister of Citizenship and Immigration
  - 7 February 2006 – 7 September 2008: Ed Komarnicki
  - 7 November 2008 – 19 September 2013: Rick Dykstra
  - 7 November 2008 – 26 March 2011: Alice Wong
  - 25 May 2011 – 19 October 2015: Chungsen Leung
  - 19 September 2013 – 19 October 2015: Costas Menegakis
- Parliamentary Secretary to the Minister of the Economic Development Agency of Canada for the Regions of Quebec
  - 9 October 2007 – 19 October 2015: Jacques Gourde
- Parliamentary Secretary to the Minister of Employment and Social Development
  - 16 February 2015 – 19 October 2015: Scott Armstrong
- Parliamentary Secretary to the Minister of the Environment
  - 7 February 2006 – 26 March 2011: Mark Warawa
  - 25 May 2011 – 15 July 2013: Michelle Rempel
  - 19 September 2013 – 19 October 2015: Colin Carrie
  - 19 September 2013 – 19 October 2015: Dean Del Mastro
- Parliamentary Secretary to the Minister of Finance
  - 7 February 2006 – 14 August 2007: Diane Ablonczy
  - 9 October 2007 – 4 January 2011: Ted Menzies
  - 30 January 2011 – 15 July 2013: Shelly Glover
  - 19 September 2013 – 19 October 2015: Andrew Saxton
- Parliamentary Secretary to the Minister of Fisheries and Oceans
  - 7 February 2006 – 19 October 2015: Randy Kamp (Asia-Pacific Gateway)
- Parliamentary Secretary to the Minister of Foreign Affairs
  - 7 February 2006 – 19 October 2015: Deepak Obhrai
  - 7 February 2006 – 27 November 2006: Peter Van Loan
  - 25 May 2011 – 19 September 2013: Bob Dechert
  - 19 September 2013 – 19 October 2015: David Anderson
  - 16 February 2015 – 19 October 2015: Bernard Trottier
- Parliamentary Secretary to the Minister of Health
  - 7 February 2006 – 7 September 2008: Steven Fletcher
  - 9 October 2007 – 7 September 2008: Guy Lauzon
  - 7 November 2008 – 19 September 2013: Colin Carrie
  - 25 May 2011 – 15 July 2013: Greg Rickford
  - 19 September 2013 – 16 February 2015: Eve Adams
  - 16 February 2015 – 19 October 2015: Cathy McLeod
- Parliamentary Secretary to the Minister of Human Resources and Social Development
  - 7 February 2006 – 7 September 2008: Lynne Yelich
  - 7 November 2008 – 26 March 2011: Ed Komarnicki
  - 25 May 2011 – 15 July 2013: Kellie Leitch
  - 25 May 2011 – 19 September 2013: Susan Truppe
  - 19 September 2013 – 16 February 2015: Scott Armstrong
- Parliamentary Secretary to the Minister of Indian Affairs and Northern Development and Federal Interlocutor for Métis and Non-Status Indians
  - 7 February 2006 – 7 September 2008: Rod Bruinooge
  - 7 November 2008 – 6 August 2010: John Duncan
  - 31 August 2010 – 30 January 2011: Shelly Glover
  - 30 January 2011 – 15 July 2013: Greg Rickford
  - 19 September 2013 – 19 October 2015: Mark Strahl
- Parliamentary Secretary to the Minister of Industry
  - 7 February 2006 – 7 September 2008: Colin Carrie
  - 7 November 2008 – 19 October 2015: Mike Lake
  - 25 May 2011 – 15 July 2013: Pierre Poilievre
  - 25 May 2011 – 15 July 2013: Greg Rickford
  - 19 September 2013 – 27 September 2013: Dean Del Mastro
- Parliamentary Secretary to the Minister for International Cooperation
  - 7 February 2006 – 9 October 2007: Ted Menzies
  - 10 April 2006 – 9 October 2007: Sylvie Boucher (La Francophonie)
  - 9 October 2007 – 20 March 2008: Brian Pallister
  - 20 March 2008 – 7 September 2008: Deepak Obhrai
  - 7 November 2008 – 4 November 2010: Jim Abbott
  - 4 November 2010 – 30 January 2011: Deepak Obhrai
  - 30 January 2011 – 19 September 2013: Lois Brown
- Parliamentary Secretary to the Minister of International Development
  - 19 September 2013 – 19 October 2015: Lois Brown
- Parliamentary Secretary to the Minister for International Trade
  - 7 February 2006 – 4 January 2007: Helena Guergis
  - 24 January 2007 – 9 October 2007: Ted Menzies
  - 24 January 2007 – 25 June 2008: James Moore
  - 9 October 2007 – 20 March 2008: Brian Pallister
  - 20 March 2008 – 19 September 2013: Gerald Keddy
  - 19 September 2013 – 5 January 2015: Erin O'Toole
  - 22 January 2015 – 19 October 2015: Parm Gill
- Parliamentary Secretary to the Minister of Justice and Attorney General of Canada
  - 7 February 2006 – 19 January 2010: Rob Moore
  - 7 November 2008 – 26 March 2011: Daniel Petit
  - 5 March 2010 – 26 March 2011: Bob Dechert
  - 25 May 2011 – 22 February 2013: Kerry-Lynne Findlay
  - 19 September 2013 – 19 October 2015: Bob Dechert
  - 25 May 2011 – 19 October 2015: Robert Goguen
- Parliamentary Secretary to the Minister of Labour
  - 9 October 2007 - 7 September 2008: Jacques Gourde
  - 7 November 2008 - 26 March 2011: Ed Komarnicki
  - 25 May 2011 – 15 July 2013: Kellie Leitch
  - 19 September 2013 – 16 February 2015: Cathy McLeod
  - 16 February 2015 – 19 October 2015: Scott Armstrong
  - 19 September 2013 – 19 October 2015: Susan Truppe
- Parliamentary Secretary to the Minister for La Francophonie and Official Languages
  - 7 February 2006 – 9 October 2007: Sylvie Boucher
- Parliamentary Secretary to the Leader of the Government in the House of Commons and Minister for Democratic Reform
  - 7 February 2006 – 19 October 2015: Tom Lukiwski
- Parliamentary Secretary to the Minister of National Defence
  - 7 February 2006 – 9 October 2007: Russ Hiebert
  - 9 October 2007 – 26 March 2011: Laurie Hawn
  - 25 May 2011 – 15 July 2013: Chris Alexander
  - 19 September 2013 – 19 October 2015: James Bezan
- Parliamentary Secretary to the Minister of National Revenue
  - 7 November 2008 – 29 January 2011: Jacques Gourde
  - 30 January 2011 – 19 September 2013: Cathy McLeod
  - 19 September 2013 – 19 October 2015: Gerald Keddy
- Parliamentary Secretary to the Minister of Natural Resources
  - 7 February 2006 – 4 January 2007: Christian Paradis
  - 24 January 2007 – 9 October 2007: Jacques Gourde
  - 9 October 2007 – 19 September 2013: David Anderson
  - 19 September 2013 – 19 October 2015: Kelly Block
- Parliamentary Secretary to the Minister for the Pacific Gateway and the Vancouver-Whistler Olympics
  - 10 April 2006 – 25 June 2008: James Moore
- Parliamentary Secretary to the Minister of Public Safety
  - 7 February 2006 – 26 March 2011: Dave MacKenzie
  - 25 May 2011 – 15 July 2013: Candice Bergen
  - 19 September 2013 – 19 October 2015: Roxanne James
- Parliamentary Secretary to the President of the Queen's Privy Council for Canada
  - 9 October 2007 – 7 September 2008: Russ Hiebert
  - 7 November 2008 – 26 March 2011: Pierre Poilievre
  - 25 May 2011 – 19 September 2013: Dean Del Mastro
  - 19 September 2013 – 19 October 2015: Peter Braid (Infrastructure and Communities)
  - 19 September 2013 – 19 October 2015: Paul Calandra (Intergovernmental Affairs)
- Parliamentary Secretary to the Minister of Public Works and Government Services
  - 7 February 2006 – 25 June 2008: James Moore (Pacific Gateway)
  - 7 November 2008 – 19 September 2013: Jacques Gourde
  - 19 September 2013 – 16 February 2015: Bernard Trottier
  - 16 February 2015 – 19 October 2015: Chris Warkentin
- Parliamentary Secretary to the Minister of Transport, Infrastructure and Communities
  - 7 February 2006 – 26 March 2011: Brian Jean
  - 25 May 2011 – 15 July 2013: Pierre Poilievre
  - 25 May 2011 – 19 September 2013: Gerald Keddy (ACOA) (Atlantic Gateway)
  - 25 May 2011 – 19 September 2013: Randy Kamp (Asia-Pacific Gateway)
  - 19 September 2013 – 19 October 2015: Jeff Watson
- Parliamentary Secretary to the President of the Treasury Board
  - 7 February 2006 – 7 September 2008: Pierre Poilievre
  - 7 November 2008 – 19 September 2013: Andrew Saxton
  - 19 September 2013 – 19 October 2015: Dan Albas
- Parliamentary Secretary to the Minister of Veterans Affairs
  - 7 February 2006 – 7 September 2008: Betty Hinton
  - 7 November 2008 – 26 March 2011: Greg Kerr
  - 25 May 2011 – 19 September 2013: Eve Adams
  - 19 September 2013 – 22 January 2015: Parm Gill
  - 22 January 2015 – 19 October 2015: Pierre Lemieux
- Parliamentary Secretary to the Minister of Western Economic Diversification
  - 25 May 2011 – 19 September 2013: Andrew Saxton
  - 19 September 2013 – 19 October 2015: Cathy McLeod

== Twenty-Ninth Canadian ministry ==
- Parliamentary Secretary to the Prime Minister
  - 2 December 2015 – 27 January 2017: Celina Caesar-Chavannes
  - 2 December 2015 – 27 January 2017: Adam Vaughan (Intergovernmental Affairs)
  - 2 December 2015 – 11 September 2019: Peter Schiefke (Youth)
  - 12 December 2019 – 12 January 2021: Omar Alghabra
  - 12 March 2021 – 18 September 2023: Greg Fergus
  - 18 September 2023 – 19 December 2024: Terry Duguid
- Parliamentary Secretary to the Minister of Agriculture and Agri-Food
  - 2 December 2015 – 11 September 2019: Jean-Claude Poissant
  - 12 December 2019 – 15 August 2021: Neil Ellis
  - 3 December 2021 – 20 February 2025: Francis Drouin
- Parliamentary Secretary to the Minister of Canadian Heritage
  - 2 December 2015 – 27 January 2017: Randy Boissonnault
  - 30 January 2017 – 31 August 2018: Sean Casey
  - 31 August 2018 – 11 September 2019: Andy Fillmore (Multiculturalism)
  - 12 December 2019 – 15 August 2021: Julie Dabrusin
  - 3 December 2021 – 18 September 2023: Chris Bittle
  - 18 September 2023 – 20 February 2025: Taleeb Noormohamed
- Parliamentary Secretary to the Minister of Border Security and Organized Crime Reduction
  - 31 August 2018 — 11 September 2019: Peter Schiefke
- Parliamentary Secretary to the Minister of Canadian Heritage (Multiculturalism)
  - 30 January 2017 – 31 August 2018: Arif Virani
  - 31 August 2018 — 11 September 2019: Gary Anandasangaree
- Parliamentary Secretary to the Minister of Democratic Institutions
  - 2 December 2015 – 27 January 2017: Mark Holland
  - 30 January 2017 – 31 August 2018: Andy Fillmore
  - 31 August 2018 — 13 January 2019: Bernadette Jordan
  - 29 January 2019 — 11 September 2019: Arif Virani
- Parliamentary Secretary to the Minister of Diversity and Inclusion and Youth and Parliamentary Secretary to the Minister of Canadian Heritage (Sport)
  - 12 December 2019 – 15 August 2021: Adam van Koeverden
- Parliamentary Secretary to the Minister of Economic Development and Official Languages (Atlantic Canada Opportunities Agency and Official Languages)
  - 12 December 2019 – 18 March 2021: René Arseneault
- Parliamentary Secretary to the Minister of Economic Development and Official Languages (Canadian Northern Economic Development Agency)
  - 12 December 2019 – 15 August 2021: Larry Bagnell
- Parliamentary Secretary to the Minister of Economic Development and Official Languages (Atlantic Canada Opportunities Agency and Official Languages)
  - 12 December 2019 – 19 March 2021: René Arseneault
  - 19 March 2021 – 15 August 2021: Darren Fisher
- Parliamentary Secretary to the Minister of Economic Development and Official Languages (Canadian Northern Economic Development Agency)
  - 12 December 2019 – 15 August 2021: Larry Bagnell
- Parliamentary Secretary to the Minister of Economic Development and Official Languages (Economic Development Agency of Canada for the Regions of Quebec)
  - 12 December 2019 – 15 August 2021: Élisabeth Brière
- Parliamentary Secretary to the Minister of Economic Development and Official Languages (Western Economic Diversification Canada) and Parliamentary Secretary to the Minister of Environment and Climate Change (Canada Water Agency)
  - 12 December 2019 – 15 August 2021: Terry Duguid
- Parliamentary Secretary to the Minister of Economic Development and Official Languages (FedNor)
  - 12 December 2019 – 15 August 2021: Terry Sheehan
- Parliamentary Secretary to the Minister of Economic Development and Official Languages (FedDev Ontario)
  - 12 December 2019 – 19 March 2021: Kate Young
  - 19 March 2021 – 15 August 2021: Marie-France Lalonde
- Parliamentary Secretary to the Minister of Employment, Workforce Development and Labour
  - 2 December 2015 – 11 September 2019: Rodger Cuzner
  - 12 December 2019 – 15 August 2021: Anthony Housefather
  - 3 December 2021 – 20 February 2025: Terry Sheehan
- Parliamentary Secretary to the Minister of Employment, Workforce Development and Disability Inclusion
  - 12 December 2019 – 18 September 2023: Irek Kusmierczyk
- Parliamentary Secretary to the Minister of Employment, Workforce Development and Official Languages
  - 18 September 2023 – 14 March 2025: Irek Kusmierczyk
- Parliamentary Secretary to the Minister of Environment and Climate Change
  - 2 December 2015 – 18 July 2018: Jonathan Wilkinson
  - 31 August 2018 — 11 September 2019: Sean Fraser
  - 12 December 2019 – 19 March 2021: Peter Schiefke
  - 19 March 2021 – 15 August 2021: Chris Bittle
  - 3 December 2021 – 14 March 2025: Julie Dabrusin
  - 3 December 2021 – 18 September 2023: Terry Duguid
  - 18 September 2023 – 14 March 2025: Adam van Koeverden
- Parliamentary Secretary to the Minister of Families, Children and Social Development
  - 2 December 2015 – 27 January 2017: Terry Duguid
  - 30 January 2017 – 15 August 2021: Adam Vaughan
  - 3 December 2021 – 25 July 2023: Ya'ara Saks
- Parliamentary Secretary to the Minister of Families, Children and Social Development (Housing and Urban Affairs)
  - 30 January 2017 – 11 September 2019: Adam Vaughan
- Parliamentary Secretary to the Minister of Families, Children and Social Development (Housing)
  - 12 December 2019 – 15 August 2021: Adam Vaughan
- Parliamentary Secretary to the Minister of Finance
  - 2 December 2015 – 10 January 2017: François-Philippe Champagne
  - 30 January 2017 – 28 August 2017: Ginette Petitpas Taylor
  - 19 September 2017 – 11 September 2019: Joël Lightbound
  - 12 December 2019 – 15 August 2021: Sean Fraser
  - 3 December 2021 – 25 July 2023: Terry Beech
- Parliamentary Secretary to the Minister of Finance and Parliamentary Secretary to the Minister of Middle Class Prosperity and Associate Minister of Finance
  - 12 December 2019 – 15 August 2021: Sean Fraser
- Parliamentary Secretary to the Minister of Fisheries, Oceans and the Canadian Coast Guard
  - 2 December 2015 – 27 January 2017: Serge Cormier
  - 30 January 2017 – 15 August 2021: Terry Beech
  - 3 December 2021 – 14 March 2025: Mike Kelloway
- Parliamentary Secretary to the Minister of Foreign Affairs
  - 2 December 2015 – 27 January 2017: Pamela Goldsmith-Jones
  - 30 January 2017 – 31 August 2018: Matt DeCourcey
  - 31 August 2018 – 11 September 2019: Andrew Leslie
  - 12 December 2019 – 14 March 2025: Rob Oliphant
- Parliamentary Secretary to the Minister of Foreign Affairs (Canada–U.S. relations)
  - 30 January 2017 – 11 September 2019: Andrew Leslie
- Parliamentary Secretary to the Minister of Foreign Affairs (Consular Affairs)
  - 2 December 2015 – 31 August 2018: Omar Alghabra
  - 31 August 2018 – 11 September 2019: Pamela Goldsmith-Jones
- Parliamentary Secretary to the Minister of Health
  - 2 December 2015 – 27 January 2017: Kamal Khera
  - 30 January 2017 – 19 September 2017: Joël Lightbound
  - 19 September 2017 – 18 July 2018: Bill Blair
  - 31 August 2018 — 11 September 2019: John Oliver
  - 12 December 2019 – 19 March 2021: Darren Fisher
  - 19 March 2021 – 15 August 2021: Jennifer O'Connell
  - 3 December 2021 – 17 September 2023: Adam van Koeverden
- Parliamentary Secretary to the Minister of Indigenous Services
  - 19 September 2017 – 31 August 2018: Don Rusnak
  - 31 August 2018 — 11 September 2019: Dan Vandal
  - 12 December 2019 – 15 August 2021: Pam Damoff
  - 3 December 2021 – 17 September 2023: Vance Badawey
- Parliamentary Secretary to the Minister of Indigenous and Northern Affairs
  - 2 December 2015 – 19 September 2017: Yvonne Jones
- Parliamentary Secretary to the Minister of Crown-Indigenous Relations
  - 19 September 2017 — 31 August 2018: Yvonne Jones
  - 31 August 2018 — 11 September 2019: Marc Miller
  - 12 December 2019 – 15 August 2021: Gary Anandasangaree
  - 3 December 2021 – 14 March 2025: Jaime Battiste
- Parliamentary Secretary to the Minister of Immigration, Refugees and Citizenship
  - 2 December 2015 – 27 January 2017: Arif Virani
  - 30 January 2017 – 31 August 2018: Serge Cormier
  - 31 August 2018 — 11 September 2019: Matt DeCourcey
  - 12 December 2019 – 19 March 2021: Soraya Martinez Ferrada
  - 19 March 2021 – 15 August 2021: Peter Schiefke
  - 3 December 2021 – 17 September 2023: Marie-France Lalonde
- Parliamentary Secretary to the Minister of Infrastructure and Communities
  - 2 December 2015 – 27 January 2017: Pablo Rodriguez
  - 30 January 2017 – 31 August 2018: Marc Miller
  - 31 August 2018 — 11 September 2019: Marco Mendicino
  - 12 December 2019 – 15 August 2021: Andy Fillmore
  - 3 December 2021 – 17 September 2023: Jennifer O'Connell
- Parliamentary Secretary to the Minister of Innovation, Science and Economic Development
  - 2 December 2015 – 27 January 2017: Greg Fergus
  - 30 January 2017 – 13 January 2019: David Lametti
  - 29 January 2019 – 11 September 2019: Rémi Massé
  - 12 December 2019 – 15 August 2021: Ali Ehsassi
  - 3 December 2021 – 17 September 2023: Andy Fillmore
- Parliamentary Secretary to the Minister of Innovation, Science and Industry (Innovation and Industry)
  - 12 December 2019 – 15 August 2021: Ali Ehsassi
- Parliamentary Secretary to Minister of Innovation, Science and Industry (Science)
  - 12 December 2019 – 28 May 2021: Will Amos
- Parliamentary Secretary to the Minister of Intergovernmental and Northern Affairs and Internal Trade
  - 31 August 2018 — 11 September 2019: Yvonne Jones
- Parliamentary Secretary to the Minister of International Development
  - 2 December 2015 – 10 January 2017: Karina Gould
  - 30 January 2017 – 31 August 2018: Celina Caesar-Chavannes
  - 31 August 2018 — 11 September 2019: Kamal Khera
  - 12 December 2019 – 3 January 2021: Kamal Khera
  - 19 March 2021 – 15 August 2021: Maninder Sidhu
  - 3 December 2021 – 14 March 2025: Anita Vandenbeld
- Parliamentary Secretary to the Minister of International Trade
  - 2 December 2015 – 27 January 2017: David Lametti
  - 30 January 2017 – 31 August 2018: Pamela Goldsmith-Jones
  - 31 August 2018 — 11 September 2019: Omar Alghabra
- Parliamentary Secretary to the Minister of Justice and Attorney General of Canada
  - 2 December 2015 – 27 January 2017: Sean Casey
  - 2 December 2015 – 18 July 2018: Bill Blair
  - 30 January 2017 – 31 August 2018: Marco Mendicino
  - 31 August 2018 – 15 August 2021: Arif Virani
  - 3 December 2021 – 18 September 2023: Gary Anandasangaree
  - 18 September 2023 – 14 March 2025: James Maloney
- Parliamentary Secretary to the Minister of Seniors
  - 31 August 2018 — 11 September 2019: Sherry Romanado
  - 12 December 2019 – 15 August 2021: Stéphane Lauzon
  - 3 December 2021 – 17 September 2023: Darren Fisher
- Parliamentary Secretary to the Leader of the Government in the House of Commons (Senate)
  - 3 December 2021 – 17 September 2023: Mark Gerretsen
- Parliamentary Secretary to the Minister of National Defence
  - 2 December 2015 – 27 January 2017: John McKay
  - 30 January 2017 – 31 August 2018: Jean Rioux
  - 31 August 2018 — 11 September 2019: Serge Cormier
  - 12 December 2019 – 15 August 2021: Anita Vandenbeld
  - 3 December 2021 – 18 September 2023: Bryan May
  - 18 September 2023 – 14 March 2025: Marie-France Lalonde
- Parliamentary Secretary to the Minister of Natural Resources
  - 2 December 2015 – 31 August 2018: Kim Rudd
  - 31 August 2018 – 19 March 2021: Paul Lefebvre
  - 19 March 2021 – 15 August 2021: Marc Serré
  - 3 December 2021 – 18 September 2023: Yvonne Jones
  - 18 September 2023 – 14 March 2025: Marc Serré
- Parliamentary Secretary to the Minister of National Revenue
  - 2 December 2015 – 27 January 2017: Emmanuel Dubourg
  - 30 January 2017 – 31 August 2018: Kamal Khera
  - 31 August 2018 — 11 September 2019: Deb Schulte
  - 12 December 2019 – 15 August 2021: Francesco Sorbara
  - 3 December 2021 – 18 September 2023: Peter Fragiskatos
  - 18 September 2023 – 14 March 2025: Iqra Khalid
- Parliamentary Secretary to the Minister of Northern Affairs
  - 12 December 2019 – 14 March 2025: Yvonne Jones
- Parliamentary Secretary to the President of the Queen's Privy Council for Canada and Parliamentary Secretary to the Leader of the Government in the House of Commons
  - 2 December 2015 – 14 March 2025: Kevin Lamoureux
- Parliamentary Secretary to the President of the Treasury Board and Parliamentary Secretary to the Minister of Digital Government
  - 2 December 2015 – 18 March 2019: Joyce Murray
  - 3 May 2019 – 3 October 2023: Greg Fergus
- Parliamentary Secretary to the Prime Minister (Public Service Renewal) and to the Deputy Prime Minister and Minister of Intergovernmental Affairs
  - 12 December 2019 – 12 January 2021: Omar Alghabra
- Parliamentary Secretary to the Minister of Public Safety and Emergency Preparedness
  - 2 December 2015 – 27 January 2017: Michel Picard
  - 30 January 2017 – 31 August 2018: Mark Holland
  - 31 August 2018 – 11 September 2019: Karen McCrimmon
  - 12 December 2019 – 15 August 2021: Joël Lightbound
  - 3 December 2021 – 17 September 2023: Pam Damoff (Public Safety)
  - 3 December 2021 – 14 March 2023: Yasir Naqvi (Emergency Preparedness)
- Parliamentary Secretary to the Minister of Public Services and Procurement
  - 2 December 2015 – 27 January 2017: Leona Alleslev
  - 30 January 2017 – 15 August 2021: Steven MacKinnon
  - 3 December 2021 – 17 September 2023: Anthony Housefather
- Parliamentary Secretary for Science
  - 2 December 2015 – 27 January 2017: Terry Beech
  - 30 January 2017 – 11 September 2019: Kate Young
- Parliamentary Secretary for Small Business and Tourism
  - 2 December 2015 – 19 September 2017: Gudie Hutchings
  - 19 September 2017 – 11 September 2019: Alaina Lockhart
  - 12 December 2019 – 15 August 2021: Rachel Bendayan
  - 3 December 2021 – 26 July 2023: Arif Virani
- Parliamentary Secretary for Sport and Persons with Disabilities
  - 2 December 2015 – 31 August 2018: Stéphane Lauzon
  - 31 August 2018 — 11 September 2019: Kate Young
  - 12 December 2019 – 14 March 2025: Adam van Koeverden
- Parliamentary Secretary for Status of Women
  - 2 December 2015 – 27 January 2017: Anju Dhillon
  - 30 January 2017 – 13 December 2018: Terry Duguid
- Parliamentary Secretary to the Minister for Women and Gender Equality and Rural Economic Development
  - 13 December 2018 – 11 September 2019: Terry Duguid
  - 12 December 2019 – 15 August 2021: Gudie Hutchings
  - 3 December 2021 – 18 September 2023: Jenna Sudds
  - 18 September 2023 – 14 March 2025: Lisa Hepfner
- Parliamentary Secretary to the Minister of Transport
  - 2 December 2015 – 27 January 2017: Kate Young
  - 30 January 2017 – 31 August 2018: Karen McCrimmon
  - 31 August 2018 – 11 September 2019: Terry Beech
  - 12 December 2019 – 19 March 2021: Chris Bittle
  - 19 March 2021 – 15 August 2021: Soraya Martinez Ferrada
  - 3 December 2021 – 18 September 2023: Annie Koutrakis
  - 18 September 2023 – 14 March 2025: Vance Badawey
- Parliamentary Secretary to the Minister of Veterans Affairs and Associate Minister of National Defence
  - 2 December 2015 – 27 January 2017: Karen McCrimmon
  - 30 January 2017 – 31 August 2018: Sherry Romanado
  - 31 August 2018 — 11 September 2019: Stéphane Lauzon
  - 12 December 2019 – 18 September 2023: Darrell Samson
  - 18 September 2023 – 14 March 2025: Randeep Sarai

== Thirtieth Canadian ministry ==
- Parliamentary Secretary to the Minister of Industry
  - 5 June 2025 – present: Karim Bardeesy
  - 5 June 2025 – present: Carlos Leitão
- Parliamentary Secretary to the Minister of Crown-Indigenous Relations
  - 5 June 2025 – present: Jaime Battiste
- Parliamentary Secretary to the Prime Minister
  - 5 June 2025 – present: Rachel Bendayan
  - 5 June 2025 – present: Kody Blois
- Parliamentary Secretary to the Minister of Veterans Affairs and Associate Minister of National Defence
  - 5 June 2025 – 25 September 2026: Sean Casey
  - 25 September 2026 – present: Sophie Chatel
- Parliamentary Secretary to the Minister of Agriculture and Agri-Food
  - 5 June 2025 – 25 September 2026: Sophie Chatel
  - 25 September 2026 – present: Daniel Gobeil
- Parliamentary Secretary to the Minister of Canadian Identity and Culture and Secretary of State (Sport)
  - 5 June 2025 – present: Madeleine Chenette
  - 5 June 2025 – present: David Myles (Minister only)
- Parliamentary Secretary to the Minister of Health
  - 5 June 2025 – present: Maggie Chi
- Parliamentary Secretary to the Minister of Jobs and Families, and Secretaries of State for Labour, Seniors, and Children and Youth
  - 5 June 2025 – present: Leslie Church
  - 5 June 2025 – present: Annie Koutrakis (Minister only)
- Parliamentary Secretary to the Minister of Housing and Infrastructure
  - 5 June 2025 – present: Caroline Desrochers
  - 5 June 2025 – present: Jennifer McKelvie
- Parliamentary Secretary to the Minister responsible for Canada-U.S. Trade, Intergovernmental Affairs and One Canadian Economy, and the President of the King's Privy Council for Canada
  - 5 June 2025 – present: Ali Ehsassi
  - 5 June 2025 – present: Tim Louis
- Parliamentary Secretary to the Minister of Foreign Affairs
  - 5 June 2025 – present: Mona Fortier
  - 5 June 2025 – present: Rob Oliphant
- Parliamentary Secretary to the Minister of Immigration, Refugees and Citizenship
  - 5 June 2025 – present: Peter Fragiskatos
- Parliamentary Secretary to the Secretary of State (Combatting Crime)
  - 5 June 2025 – present: Vince Gasparro
- Parliamentary Secretary to the Minister of Environment and Climate Change
  - 5 June 2025 – present: Wade Grant
- Parliamentary Secretary to the Minister of Energy and Natural Resources
  - 5 June 2025 – present: Corey Hogan
  - 5 June 2025 – present: Claude Guay
- Parliamentary Secretary to the Minister of Northern and Arctic Affairs
  - 5 June 2025 – present: Brendan Hanley
- Parliamentary Secretary to the Minister of Emergency Management and Community Resilience
  - 5 June 2025 – present: Anthony Housefather
- Parliamentary Secretary to the Minister of Transport and Internal Trade
  - 5 June 2025 – present: Mike Kelloway
- Parliamentary Secretary to the Minister of Fisheries
  - 5 June 2025 – present: Ernie Klassen
- Parliamentary Secretary to the Leader of the Government in the House of Commons
  - 5 June 2025 – present: Kevin Lamoureux

Parliamentary Secretary to the Minister of Justice and Attorney General of Canada

  - 5 June 2025 – present: Patricia Lattanzio
- Parliamentary Secretary to the Minister of Indigenous Services
  - 5 June 2025 – present: Ginette Lavack
- Parliamentary Secretary to the Minister of Women and Gender Equality and Secretary of State (Small Business and Tourism)
  - 5 June 2025 – present: Marie-Gabrielle Ménard
- Parliamentary Secretary to the Secretary of State (Nature)
  - 5 June 2025 – present: David Myles
- Parliamentary Secretary to the Minister of Artificial Intelligence and Digital Innovation
  - 5 June 2025 – present: Taleeb Noormohamed
- Parliamentary Secretary to the President of the Treasury Board
  - 5 June 2025 – present: Tom Osborne
- Parliamentary Secretary to the Minister of Public Safety
  - 5 June 2025 – present: Jacques Ramsay
- Parliamentary Secretary to the Secretary of State (Rural Development)
  - 5 June 2025 – present: Pauline Rochefort
- Parliamentary Secretary to the Minister of National Defence
  - 5 June 2025 – present: Sherry Romanado
- Parliamentary Secretary to the Minister of Government Transformation, Public Services and Procurement and the Secretary of State (Defence Procurement)
  - 5 June 2025 – present: Jenna Sudds
- Parliamentary Secretary to the Minister of Finance and National Revenue and the Secretary of State (Canada Revenue Agency and Financial Institutions)
  - 5 June 2025 – present: Ryan Turnbull
- Parliamentary Secretary to the Prime Minister (Special Representative for the Reconstruction of Ukraine)
  - 16 September 2025 – 9 January 2026: Chrystia Freeland
