= Lasalle (electoral district) =

Former federal electoral district in Quebec, Canada

Quebec electoral district

Defunct federal electoral district
- Legislature: House of Commons
- District created: 1966
- District abolished: 1987
- First contested: 1968
- Last contested: 1984

Lasalle (later known as Lasalle—Émard—Côte Saint-Paul) was a federal electoral district in Quebec, Canada, represented in the House of Commons of Canada from 1968 to 1988.

It was created in 1966 from parts of Jacques-Cartier—Lasalle and Saint-Henri ridings. The district comprised the City of LaSalle and a portion of the City of Montreal adjacent to it.

In 1973, the district was renamed Lasalle—Émard—Côte Saint-Paul.

It was abolished in 1976 and redistributed into the new Lasalle riding, as well as the Verdun and Westmount ridings. It was reconstituted in 1987 as LaSalle—Émard.

== Members of Parliament ==
This riding elected the following members of Parliament:

Parliament	Years	Member	Party
Lasalle; Riding created from Jacques-Cartier—Lasalle and Saint-Henri
28th	1968–1972	Hilarion-Pit Lessard	Liberal
29th	1972–1974	John Campbell	Liberal
Lasalle—Émard—Côte Saint-Paul
30th	1974–1979	John Campbell	Liberal
Lasalle
31st	1979–1980	John Campbell	Liberal
32nd	1980–1984	John Campbell	Liberal
33rd	1984–1988	Claude Lanthier	Progressive Conservative
Riding dissolved into LaSalle—Émard

== Election results ==
=== Lasalle, 1968–1974 ===
1968 Canadian federal election
Party	Candidate	Votes
Liberal	Hilarion-Pit Lessard	26,546
Progressive Conservative	Gérald Raymond	7,018
New Democratic	John Bellini	4,097
Ralliement créditiste	Roland Limoges	982

1972 Canadian federal election
Party	Candidate	Votes
Liberal	John Campbell	30,816
Progressive Conservative	Adolphe Lapointe	7,652
Social Credit	John Holmes	6,339
New Democratic	Gaston Coté	5,195

=== Lasalle—Émard—Côte Saint-Paul, 1974–1979 ===
1974 Canadian federal election
Party	Candidate	Votes
Liberal	John Campbell	28,134
Progressive Conservative	Ginette Lapointe	8,612
New Democratic	Gaston Coté	4,560
Social Credit	John Holmes	2,955
Marxist–Leninist	David Orton	283

=== Lasalle, 1979–1988 ===
1979 Canadian federal election
Party	Candidate	Votes
Liberal	John Campbell	36,560
Progressive Conservative	Keith MacLellan	4,669
New Democratic	Gaston Coté	3,249
Social Credit	John Holmes	2,668
Rhinoceros	Totoune Michel Dumais	1,037
Union populaire	Olive Grégoire Bergeron	309
Marxist–Leninist	Claude Brunelle	202

1980 Canadian federal election
Party	Candidate	Votes
Liberal	John Campbell	32,561
New Democratic	Gaston Coté	5,173
Progressive Conservative	Jean Marie Corvington	3,128
Union populaire	Olive Grégoire Bergeron	507
Marxist–Leninist	Claude Brunelle	255

1984 Canadian federal election
Party	Candidate	Votes
Progressive Conservative	Claude Lanthier	23,238
Liberal	John Campbell	19,418
New Democratic	Pietro Arella	4,755
Rhinoceros	Danielle Plymouth Gauthier	1,331
Parti nationaliste	Mireille Massé	861
Commonwealth of Canada	Andy Boyle	122

== See also ==
- List of Canadian electoral districts
- Historical federal electoral districts of Canada
