= Diane Stratas =

Canadian politician (1932–2023)

Member of Parliament for Scarborough Centre
- In office 1979–1980
- Succeeded by: Norm Kelly

Personal details
- Born: 28 December 1932 Saskatoon, Saskatchewan, Canada
- Died: 4 May 2023 (aged 90)
- Party: Progressive Conservative
- Spouse: William Stratas
- Profession: Politician, businesswoman

Diane Rose Stratas (28 December 1932 – 4 May 2023) was a Canadian politician and businesswoman. She was a Progressive Conservative member of the House of Commons of Canada from 1979 to 1980.

== Background ==
Stratas was a businesswoman and community service volunteer by career. She was the middle daughter of immigrants from a village named Kastri om Greece who lived in Saskatoon, Saskatchewan. She was married to retired veterinarian, William J. Stratas, who died in 2013. In December 2009, her second son, David Stratas, was appointed a judge of the Federal Court of Appeal, based in Ottawa.

== Politics ==
Stratas represented the newly formed Ontario constituency of Scarborough Centre, which she won by a comfortable margin in the 1979 federal election. In September 1979, she was appointed Parliamentary Secretary to the Secretary of State, David MacDonald.

After serving one term, the 31st Canadian Parliament, she was defeated in the 1980 federal election by Norm Kelly of the Liberal Party. Following this defeat, she was elected national secretary of the Progressive Conservative Party of Canada. She did not run for federal office in the 1984 federal election but instead supported the candidacy of Pauline Browes.

== After politics ==
In 1987, she was appointed to the national Refugee Status Advisory Committee but resigned within three months. She felt uncomfortable accepting a "political patronage appointment" and that federal policy was presenting additional difficulties for refugees.

Stratas died on 4 May 2023, at the age of 90.
