= Marcel Tremblay (Quebec City politician) =

Canadian politician (born 1943)

Marcel R. Tremblay (30 March 1943–21 April 2021) is a former Progressive Conservative member of the House of Commons of Canada. Born in L'Ange-Gardien, Quebec, he was an accountant and business consultant by career.

He represented the Quebec riding of Quebec East where he was first elected in the 1984 federal election and re-elected in 1988, therefore becoming a member in the 33rd and 34th Canadian Parliaments.

Tremblay left federal politics after he was defeated in the 1993 federal election by Jean-Paul Marchand of the Bloc Québécois.
