= John Campbell (Quebec politician) =

Canadian politician

John Campbell (born 2 January 1936 in Valleyfield, Quebec) is a former Liberal party member of the House of Commons of Canada. He was an insurance agent and businessman by career.

From 1967 to 1980, he was a Lasalle city councillor. He won the Lasalle electoral district in the 1972 federal election and was re-elected in the 1974, 1979 and 1980 federal elections. In the 1984 federal election, he was defeated by Claude Lanthier of the Progressive Conservative party. He served four consecutive terms from the 29th Canadian Parliament through the 32nd Canadian Parliament.

== Electoral record (incomplete) ==
1980 Canadian federal election: Lasalle
Party	Candidate	Votes	%	±%
Liberal	John Campbell	32,561	78.23	+3.15
New Democratic	Gaston Côté	5,173	12.43	+5.76
Progressive Conservative	Jean Marie Corvington	3,128	7.51	−2.08
Union populaire	Olive Grégoire Bergeron	507	1.22	+0.59
Marxist–Leninist	Claude Brunelle	255	0.61	+0.20
Total valid votes		41,624	100.00	
Total rejected ballots		734		
Turnout		42,358	66.09	−12.29
Electors on the lists		64,091		
lop.parl.ca

Source: Canadian Elections Database

1979 Canadian federal election: Lasalle
Party	Candidate	Votes	%	±%
Liberal	John Campbell	36,560	75.08	
Progressive Conservative	Keith MacLellan	4,669	9.59	
New Democratic	Gaston Côté	3,249	6.67	
Social Credit	John Holmes	2,668	5.48	
Rhinoceros	Totoune Michel Dumais	1,037	2.13	
Union populaire	Olive Grégoire Bergeron	309	0.63	
Marxist–Leninist	Claude Brunelle	202	0.41	
Total valid votes		48,694	100.00	
Total rejected ballots		767		
Turnout		49,461	78.38	
Electors on the lists		63,108		

Source: Canadian Elections Database
