= Suzanne Beauchamp-Niquet =

Canadian politician (1932–2011)

Member of Parliament for Roberval
- In office 18 February 1980 – 3 September 1984
- Preceded by: Charles-Arthur Gauthier
- Succeeded by: Benoît Bouchard

Personal details
- Born: 11 August 1932 Russell, Ontario, Canada
- Died: 22 February 2011 (aged 78) Dolbeau, Quebec, Canada
- Party: Liberal
- Spouse(s): Gaston Niquet m. 6 February 1960
- Portfolio: Parliamentary Secretary to the Secretary of State for External Affairs (1983–1984)

Suzanne Beauchamp-Niquet (French pronunciation: [syzan boʃɑ̃ nikɛ]; 11 August 1932 – 22 February 2011) was a Liberal party member of the House of Commons of Canada. She was an administrator by career.

Born in Russell, Ontario, she attended schools in Vanier, Val d'Or and Abitibi-Jonquière. She also attended the Collège des Soeurs Grises de la Croix.

She was elected at the Roberval electoral district in the 1980 federal election and served in the 32nd Canadian Parliament. Following defeat in the 1984 federal election to Benoît Bouchard of the Progressive Conservative party, she left federal politics.

Beauchamp-Niquet also served as mayor of Dolbeau, Quebec from 1977 to 1981.
