= Norm Kelly =

Canadian politician (born 1941)

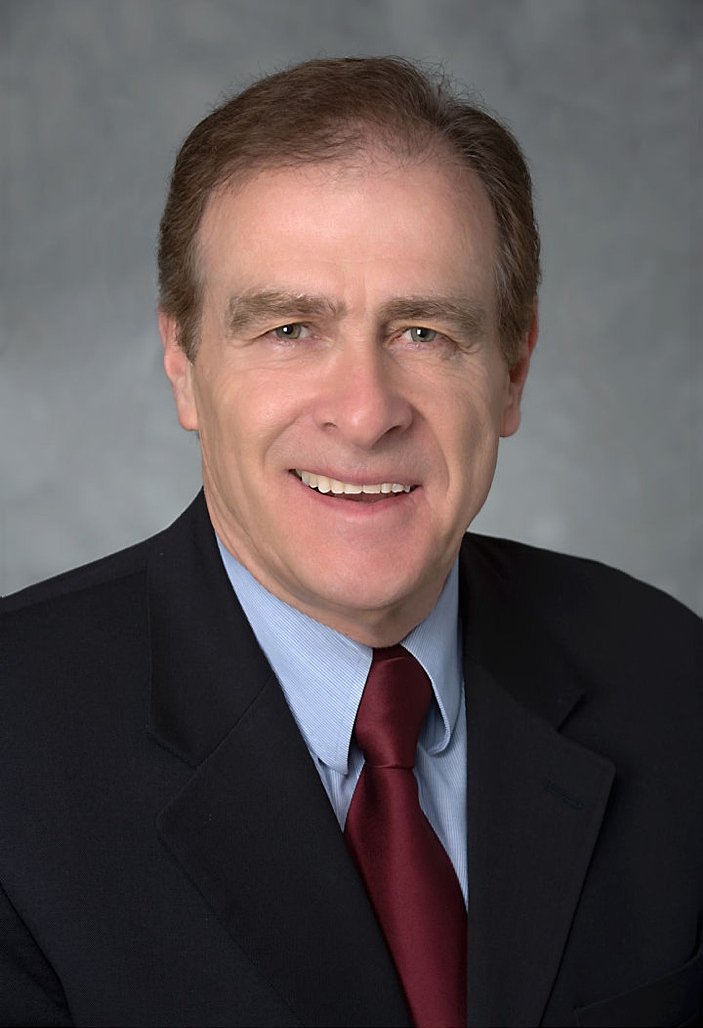
- Kelly in 2009

Toronto City Councillor for Ward 40 Scarborough—Agincourt
- In office December 1, 2000 – December 1, 2018
- Preceded by: Sherene Shaw
- Succeeded by: Jim Karygiannis

Deputy Mayor of Toronto (Note: Certain powers usually assigned to the mayor were transferred to Kelly during a special meeting of city council on November 15, 2013.)
- In office August 21, 2013 – November 30, 2014
- Preceded by: Doug Holyday
- Succeeded by: Denzil Minnan-Wong

Chair of the Scarborough Community Council
- In office December 1, 2006 – December 1, 2008
- Preceded by: Michael Thompson
- Succeeded by: Michael Del Grande

Toronto City Councillor for Ward 14 Scarborough Wexford
- In office January 1, 1998 – November 30, 2000
- Preceded by: Ward Created
- Succeeded by: Ward Abolished

Metro Toronto City Councillor for Ward 14 Scarborough Wexford
- In office December 1, 1994 – January 1, 1998
- Preceded by: Maureen Prinsloo
- Succeeded by: City Amalgamated

Member of Parliament for Scarborough Centre
- In office February 18, 1980 – September 4, 1984
- Preceded by: Diane Stratas
- Succeeded by: Pauline Browes

Personal details
- Born: Norman Kelly; August 11, 1941 (age 85) Toronto, Ontario, Canada
- Party: Liberal
- Spouse: Charlotte Kelly
- Children: 2

Norman Kelly (born August 11, 1941) is a retired Canadian politician. He represented Ward 40 Scarborough—Agincourt from 2000 to 2018 and served as deputy mayor of Toronto from 2013 to 2014. Kelly was a City of Scarborough councillor from 1974 to 1980 and 1988 to 2000 and served as the member of Parliament (MP) for Scarborough Centre from 1980 to 1984.

== Background ==
Kelly is a trained historian. He studied Canadian political history at the University of Western Ontario and attended Carleton University, earning an M.A., and Queen's University, where he began, but did not complete, a Ph.D. Among his most important accomplishments, Kelly undertook a two-year research project for the two best-selling books in the field of Canadian history: The National Dream and The Last Spike, written by Pierre Berton.

Kelly won the Governor General's Award for his work in The National Dream, which was transferred to television by the CBC as a popular, award-winning documentary series of the same name. Kelly was also a history teacher at Upper Canada College, a private school, and A. Y. Jackson Secondary School, in Toronto.

== Early political career ==
When he first entered politics as an alderman for Ward 3 on the borough council of Scarborough, then a suburb of Toronto. Kelly served from 1974 to 1980.

== Federal politics ==
He was elected as a federal Member of Parliament for Scarborough Centre in the 1980 election, defeating Progressive Conservative (PC) incumbent Diane Stratas. Kelly was twice appointed Parliamentary Secretary: first, to the ministry of Supply and Services and then to the president of the Treasury Board. In this latter capacity, Kelly was given the responsibility of guiding the government's reorganization of its Crown Corporations, Bill C-124, through the House of Commons and its Committees. Kelly was also appointed in 1983 to the Special Committee on Visible Minorities in Canadian Society. This committee was charged with the responsibility of doing research on the status of visible minorities in Canadian society.

The report, Equality Now, contained 80 ground breaking recommendations aimed at protecting visible minority cultures in Canada while integrating their members into the Canadian mainstream. Kelly lost in the 1984 election, to PC candidate Pauline Browes. He attempted to win the Liberal nomination prior to the 1988 election, but quit the race when Odysseus Katsaitis emerged as the front runner. Prior to the 1993 federal election, he again tried for a Liberal nomination, but this time lost to John Cannis.

== Campaign for mayor ==
In 1985, he ran for mayor of Scarborough, but lost to incumbent Gus Harris. Out of office, he worked as a real estate agent, first for Royal LePage and then for his own company. In 1988, he decided to again run for mayor, but this time lost by over 4,000 votes to Joyce Trimmer, the first woman elected mayor of Scarborough.

== Return to Council ==
In the 1994 municipal elections, he was elected to the Metro Toronto council from ward 14 Scarborough Wexford, defeating Michael Thompson. He emerged as one of the most right-wing members of the council, most noted for his attempt to eliminate all funding for multiculturalism programs during a mock council. Kelly took this stance as he views multicultural programs to further segregate rather than integrate diverse members of the Canadian community. The National Post newspaper once endorsed him, perhaps somewhat in jest, as "a solid anti-communist. Toronto needs his representation as a bulwark against the left." He also became one of the earliest advocates for merging the City of Toronto with five of its suburbs, an idea he pushed as Chair of the Intergovernmental Affairs Committee.

When the "megacity" was created, he was elected to the new Toronto city council. In the 2000 municipal election, redistricting merged Kelly and Mike Tzekas' wards, leading to a bitter election battle between the two, which Kelly easily won. A firm ally of the new city's first mayor, Mel Lastman, his relations with Lastman's successor, David Miller, were less friendly. Kelly was one of five Councillors removed from the Toronto Transit Commission board by council in March 2012 because of his support of mayor Rob Ford's subway plan as opposed to council's preferred LRT plan.

== Deputy mayor of Toronto ==
Kelly was made deputy mayor of Toronto, succeeding Doug Holyday in 2013 after Holyday resigned from Council to contest a by-election for the Legislative Assembly of Ontario.

Following the controversy surrounding Toronto Mayor Rob Ford's admitted substance abuse and further allegations of inappropriate conduct, the Toronto City Council voted on November 15, 2013, and November 18, 2013, to remove the non-statutory mayoral powers from Ford and grant them to Kelly for the remainder of Ford's term. This was unprecedented as the deputy mayor's role is typically largely ceremonial.

On May 1, 2014, Kelly took over the remainder of Ford's duties when Ford entered drug rehabilitation and started a leave of absence from Toronto City Council. These powers were returned when Ford returned to his job on July 1. Even though Kelly had all the powers of the mayoral office for 3 months, Ford still technically held the title of Mayor, while Kelly was still referred to as the Deputy Mayor.

== 2018 election ==
Kelly ran for re-election in the 2018 Toronto election in the newly constituted Ward 22 Scarborough—Agincourt and lost to fellow incumbent councillor for former Ward 43, Jim Karygiannis.

== Internet popularity ==
In the summer of 2015, Norm Kelly became an international internet sensation when he weighed in on the feud between Canadian rapper Drake and American rapper Meek Mill via Twitter. He has become the figure of several internet memes and has reached fame in the hip-hop community for his involvement in the feud. Through supporting Drake and posting humorous content to his account, Kelly gained a sizable Twitter following of well over 720,000. In September 2015, the nonprofit organization HackerNest presented Kelly with the "Nerd Champion" award for his support of the city's technology community.

Kelly was voted Canada's Most Valuable Tweeter for 2015 in a tournament held by Twitter Canada.

In addition to being a Twitter sensation, Kelly, also known as "6Dad," has his own line of clothing. It includes T-shirts, hoodies, and sweatpants featuring images of Kelly, the word "Dad" in different languages, and slogans such as "Too lit to politic." A portion of the proceeds are donated to charity.

== Election results ==
2018 Toronto election, Ward 22
Council Candidate	Vote	%
Jim Karygiannis	12,593	46.80
Norm Kelly	9,944	36.96
Roland Lin	2,789	10.37
Michael Korzeniewski	660	2.45
Vincent Lee	597	2.22
Jude Coutinho	234	0.87
Jason Woychesko	90	0.33

2014 Toronto election, Ward 40
Council Candidate	Vote	%
Norm Kelly	16,052	85.97
Borenstein Josh	1,347	7.21
Internicola Anthony	1,273	6.82

2010 Toronto election, Ward 40
Council Candidate	Vote	%
Norm Kelly	12,458	74.00
Ken Sy	1,935	11.49
Bryan Heal	1,862	11.06
Cheng-Chih Tsai	580	3.45

1984 Canadian federal election: Scarborough Centre
Party	Candidate	Votes	%	±%
Progressive Conservative	Pauline Browes	19,968	46.7	+10.2
Liberal	Norm Kelly	14,229	33.3	−7.1
New Democratic	Michael Prue	8,240	19.3	−3.2
Libertarian	Mathias Blecker	345	0.8	+0.2
Total valid votes		42,782	100.0	

1980 Canadian federal election: Scarborough Centre
Party	Candidate	Votes	%	±%
Liberal	Norm Kelly	16,595	40.3	+7.0
Progressive Conservative	Diane Stratas	14,995	36.4	−7.0
New Democratic	Michael Prue	9,237	22.4	+0.3
Libertarian	Mathias Blecker	238	0.6	+0.1
Marxist–Leninist	Judith Killoran	97	0.2	+0.1
Total valid votes		41,162	100.0	
