= Claude Lanthier =

Canadian politician (1933–2015)

Member of Parliament for Lasalle
- In office September 4, 1984 – November 20, 1988
- Preceded by: John Campbell
- Succeeded by: District abolished

Personal details
- Born: January 24, 1933 Montreal, Quebec, Canada
- Died: April 12, 2015 (aged 82)
- Party: Progressive Conservative
- Occupation: Engineer, professor

Claude Lanthier (January 24, 1933 – April 12, 2015) was a Canadian politician.

An engineering professional, professor at University de Montreal's École d'Architecture, and well known wine connoisseur (also member of the Board for Québec's Liquor Board c. 1978-1982), Lanthier was elected to the House of Commons of Canada as the Progressive Conservative Member of Parliament for the Montreal riding of Lasalle in the 1984 federal election. He served variously as Parliamentary Secretary to the Minister of Finance, Parliamentary Secretary to the Minister of State for Science and Technology, and lastly Parliamentary Secretary to the Minister of Public Works.

He was defeated in the 1988 federal election in what was now LaSalle—Émard riding by Paul Martin. Following his defeat, Lanthier was appointed as one of Canada's representatives on the International Joint Commission; later appointed Canadian chairman.

== Electoral record (partial) ==
1988 Canadian federal election: LaSalle—Émard
Party	Candidate	Votes	%	±%	Expenditures
Liberal	Paul Martin	23,394	45.46	–	$39,415
Progressive Conservative	Claude Lanthier	21,979	42.71		$46,839
New Democratic	Jean-Claude Bohrer	5,458	10.61		$4,490
Marxist–Leninist	Ginette Boutet	305	0.59		$130
Communist	Ginette Gauthier	212	0.41		$18
Commonwealth of Canada	Nancy Guice	117	0.23		$0
Total valid votes		51,465	100.00		
Total rejected ballots		1,012			
Turnout		52,477	77.65		
Electors on the lists		67,584			
Source: Report of the Chief Electoral Officer, Thirty-fourth General Election, 1988.
