= Pauline Browes =

Canadian politician (born 1938)

The Honourable Pauline Browes PC
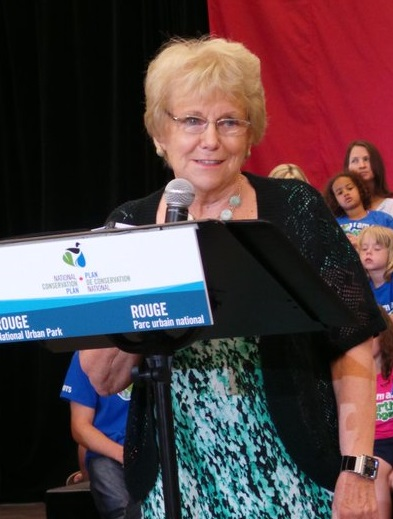

Member of Parliament for Scarborough Centre
- In office September 4, 1984 – October 25, 1993
- Preceded by: Norm Kelly
- Succeeded by: John Cannis

Personal details
- Born: May 7, 1938 (age 87) Harwood, Ontario, Canada
- Party: Conservative (Federal); Progressive Conservative (Provincial)
- Profession: Teacher

Pauline Browes PC (born May 7, 1938) is a former Canadian politician. She was a Member of Parliament between 1984 and 1993.

An educator by training, Browes was first elected to the House of Commons of Canada as the Progressive Conservative Member of Parliament for the riding of Scarborough Centre in the 1984 federal election. The PCs, led by Brian Mulroney, won power with the largest majority government in Canadian history.

She served as parliamentary secretary to the Minister of the Environment from 1986 to 1989, and as parliamentary secretary to both the Secretary of State for Canada and the Minister of State for multiculturalism and citizenship from 1989 until 1991. In that year, Mulroney appointed her Minister of State for the Environment.

In January 1993, she was moved to the position of Minister of State for Employment and Immigration. When Kim Campbell succeeded Mulroney as PC leader and Prime Minister of Canada in June 1993, she promoted Browes to Minister of Indian Affairs and Northern Development. However, in the subsequent 1993 federal election, the Campbell government was defeated and Browes lost her seat.

During the 1995 Ontario provincial election, she served as a special advisor to the Progressive Conservative Party of Ontario election campaign won by Mike Harris, who became Premier of Ontario. Harris subsequently appointed her Vice Chair of the Ontario Environmental Review Tribunal.

On April 20, 2005, the National Post reported that Browes had been recruited by the Conservative Party of Canada as one of their star candidates in the 2006 federal election. She ran in the riding of Scarborough-Guildwood, coming second to Liberal incumbent John McKay with 11,790 votes (28.7%).

She currently sits on the Joint Political Advisory Committee of the North American trilateral Commission for Environmental Cooperation.

She is the daughter of former Member of Parliament, Earle Drope.

Parliament of Canada
Political offices
Preceded by Thomas Edward Siddon	Minister of Indian Affairs and Northern Development; 1993	Succeeded by Ron Irwin
