= Rob Nicholson (politician) =

Canadian politician (born 1952)

The Honourable Robert Nicholson PC KC
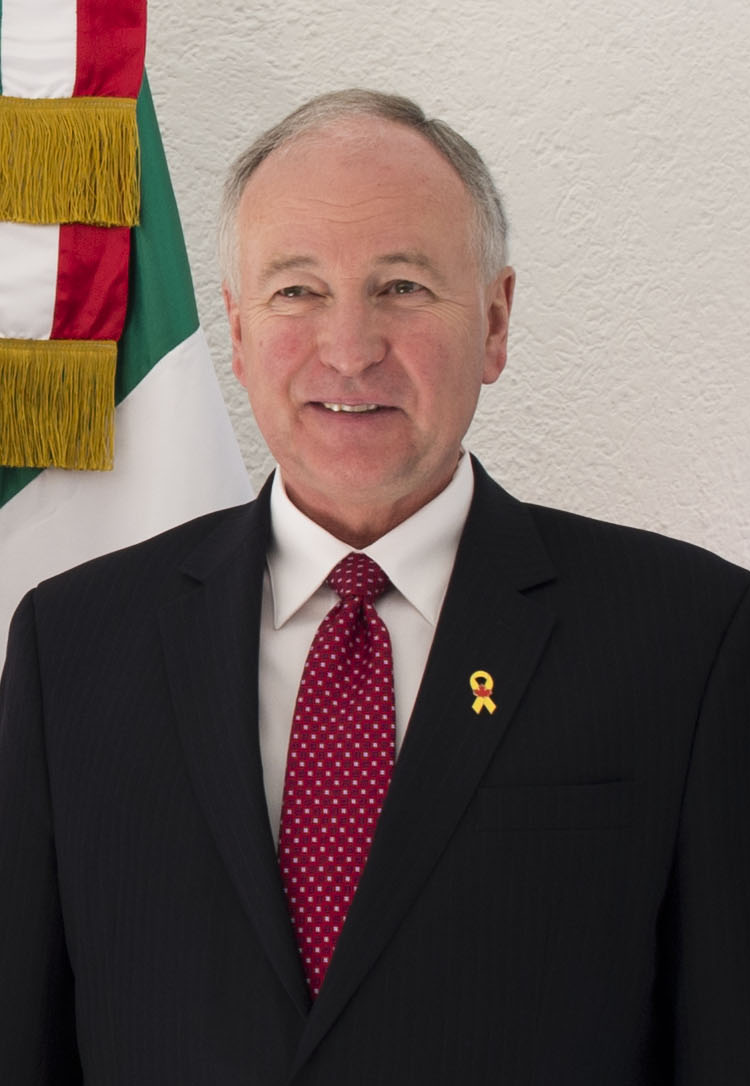
- Nicholson in 2014

Shadow Minister of Justice Shadow Attorney General of Canada
- In office November 20, 2015 – September 11, 2019
- Leader: Rona Ambrose; Andrew Scheer
- Preceded by: Françoise Boivin
- Succeeded by: Rob Moore

Minister of Foreign Affairs
- In office February 9, 2015 – November 4, 2015
- Prime Minister: Stephen Harper
- Preceded by: John Baird
- Succeeded by: Stéphane Dion

Minister of National Defence
- In office July 15, 2013 – February 9, 2015
- Prime Minister: Stephen Harper
- Preceded by: Peter MacKay
- Succeeded by: Jason Kenney

Minister of Justice Attorney General of Canada
- In office January 4, 2007 – July 15, 2013
- Prime Minister: Stephen Harper
- Preceded by: Vic Toews
- Succeeded by: Peter MacKay

Leader of the Government in the House of Commons
- In office February 6, 2006 – January 4, 2007
- Prime Minister: Stephen Harper
- Preceded by: Tony Valeri
- Succeeded by: Peter Van Loan

Minister responsible for Democratic Reform
- In office February 6, 2006 – January 4, 2007
- Prime Minister: Stephen Harper
- Preceded by: Belinda Stronach (Democratic Renewal)
- Succeeded by: Peter Van Loan

Member of Parliament for Niagara Falls
- In office July 28, 2004 – September 11, 2019
- Preceded by: Gary Pillitteri
- Succeeded by: Tony Baldinelli
- In office September 4, 1984 – October 25, 1993
- Preceded by: Al MacBain
- Succeeded by: Gary Pillitteri

Personal details
- Born: Robert Douglas Nicholson; April 29, 1952 (age 74) Niagara Falls, Ontario, Canada
- Party: Progressive Conservative (Before 2003); Conservative (2003–present)
- Spouse: Arlene Nicholson
- Education: Queen's University; University of Windsor

Robert Douglas Nicholson PC KC (born April 29, 1952) is a Canadian politician who represented the riding of Niagara Falls in the House of Commons of Canada from 2004 to 2019 as a member of the Conservative Party. Under Prime Minister Stephen Harper, he served as Minister of National Defence, Minister of Justice, Minister of Foreign Affairs, and Leader of the Government in the House of Commons. When the Harper Government ended, he was appointed Justice Critic in the Official Opposition shadow cabinet.

== Early life ==
Nicholson was born in Niagara Falls, Ontario. He received a Bachelor of Arts degree from Queen's University and a law degree from the University of Windsor. Nicholson practised law before entering politics, and is a member of the Law Society of Ontario.

== Political career ==
=== First terms in the House of Commons (1984–1993) ===
Nicholson was first elected to federal parliament in the federal election of 1984 as a Progressive Conservative, defeating New Democrat Richard Harrington and incumbent Liberal Al MacBain. He was re-elected by a narrower margin in the 1988 election, defeating Liberal Gary Pillitteri by fewer than 2,000 votes.

During the 33rd Canadian Parliament, he served on the standing committees responsible for justice (vice-chairman), foreign affairs, national defence and transport. Nicholson also served on the special committee on child care.

During the 34th Canadian Parliament, he continued to serve on the justice committee and was also named a parliamentary secretary, supporting the Government House Leader (1989-1990) and the Attorney General of Canada (1989-1993) in Prime Minister of Canada Brian Mulroney's government.

Following Kim Campbell's appointment as prime minister, Nicholson joined the cabinet as Minister for Science and Minister responsible for Small Business.

As with all of his caucus colleagues, save for Jean Charest and Elsie Wayne, he was defeated in the 1993 election, finishing third behind Pillitteri and Mel Grunstein of the Reform Party.

=== Municipal politics ===
Nicholson was elected as a trustee for the Niagara Catholic District School Board in 1994. He was elected to the Niagara Regional Council later in 1997, and was re-elected in 2000, and 2003. He ran for Chairman of the Regional Municipality of Niagara in late 2003, but lost to St. Catharines Regional Councillor Peter Partington.

He attempted to regain his old Commons seat in the 1997 election, but again finished third. He did not seek election to the Commons in the 2000 election.

=== Return to Opposition in 38th Parliament ===
The Progressive Conservatives merged with the Canadian Alliance as the Conservative Party of Canada in early 2004, and Nicholson joined the new party. He was narrowly returned to parliament in the 2004 election, defeating Liberal Victor Pietrangelo by more than 1,000 votes.

Nicholson served as Shadow Transportation Critic from July 2004 to January 2005. He was appointed Chief Opposition Whip on January 28, 2005.

During the 38th Canadian Parliament, he was one of only two members of the 99-member Conservative caucus in the Commons who had previously served in the federal cabinet.

=== Harper government (2005-2015) ===
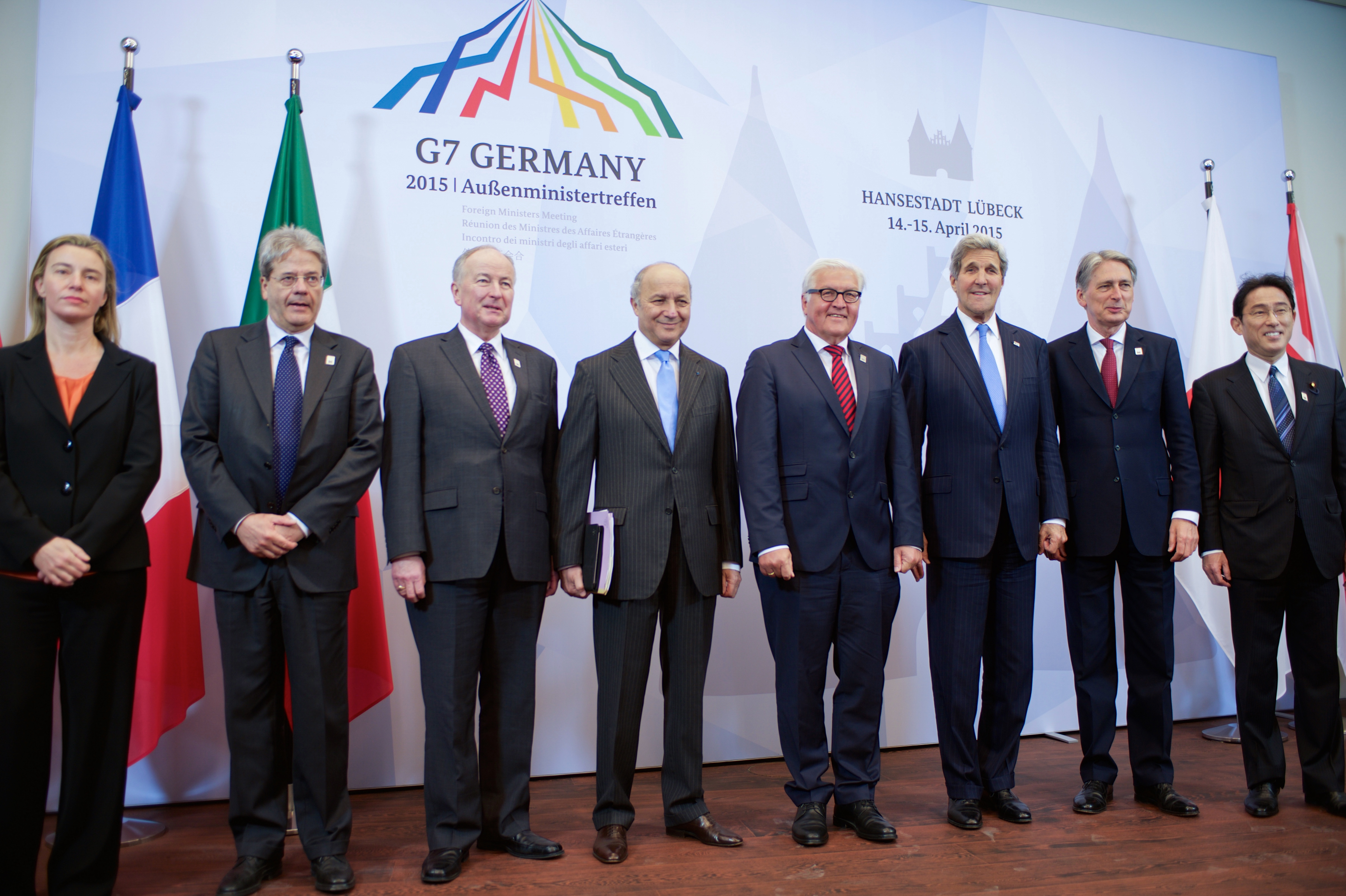
Rob Nicholson at G7 Foreign Ministers & EU High Representative for Foreign Affairs Meeting in Germany

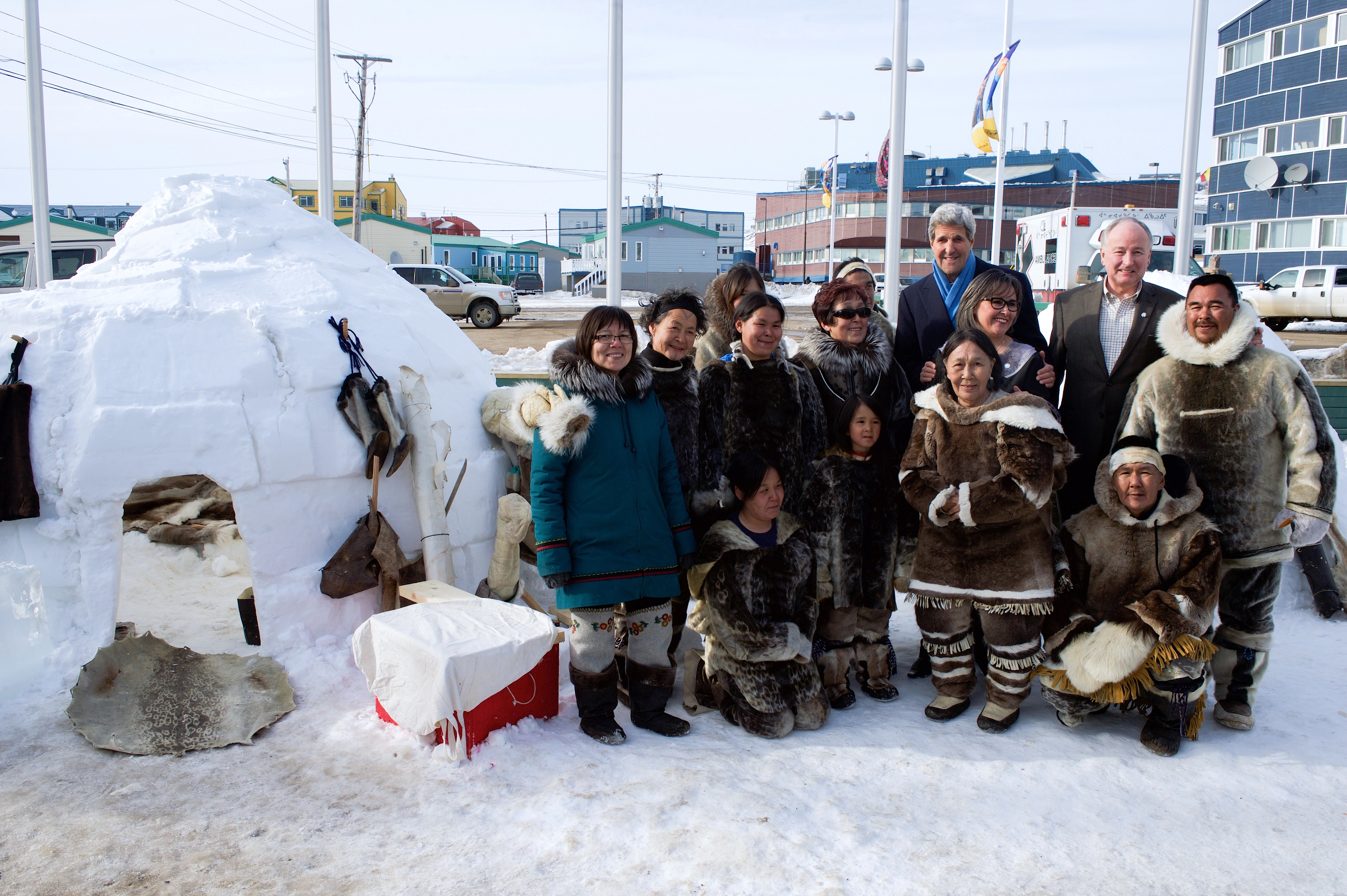
Robert Nicholson, U.S. Secretary of State John Kerry with aboriginal northerners at a replica Inuit village in Aglukkaq's hometown of Inaquit, Canada

Nicholson was re-elected in the 2006 election and appointed to the Harper cabinet as Government House Leader.

==== Minister of Justice (2007-2013) ====
Nicholson was appointed as Minister of Justice and Attorney General of Canada in early 2007. He replaced Vic Toews as Justice Minister during a Cabinet shuffle on January 4, 2007. Peter Van Loan replaced Nicholson as Government House Leader.

On March 13, 2010, Nicholson released the terms of reference for the appointment of Frank Iacobucci as an Independent Adviser. Iacobucci will conduct an independent review of documents related to the transfer of detainees by the Canadian Forces in Afghanistan.

This statement comes after Richard Colvin spoke before a parliamentary committee stating that he warned for a full year that detainees Canadian troops handed over to Afghan forces faced torture before the government began to monitor them. “London, The Hague and Canberra [Australia] are deeply concerned about the absence of solid legal protections for detainees, which – in the age of Gitmo and Abu Ghraib – imperils domestic support for the Afghanistan mission,” said the memo of December 4, 2006, written by diplomat Richard Colvin. Amir Attaran also brought forward testimony in stark contrast to then Canadian Ambassador to Afghanistan David Sproule's. Afgan prisoners testified that after capture by Canadians, they were subsequently handed to the custody of the Afghan National Army (ANA), claiming they were later abused by the ANA.

==== Minister of Defence (2013-2015) ====
In the July 15, 2013 cabinet shuffle, Nicholson switched portfolios with Peter Mackay and became the Minister of Defence.

==== Minister of Foreign Affairs (2015) ====
Because of John Baird's resignation, Harper was forced to reshuffle his Ministry on 9 February 2015. An unexpected beneficiary of the Baird defalcation was Nicholson, who was promoted to become Minister of Foreign Affairs. Nicholson's time as head of the Canadian Foreign Service was cut short when he was ejected from office on 4 November 2015 as Harper lost the 2015 election.

=== Back in opposition (2015-2019) ===
While the Conservatives were relegated to the Official Opposition after the 2015 election, Nicholson was re-elected and announced his intention to run for the interim leadership of the party. He was defeated by Rona Ambrose, and was subsequently named as the Conservative Justice Critic.

Nicholson did not run for re-election in the 2019 federal election.

== Election results ==
2015 Canadian federal election
Party	Candidate	Votes	%	±%	Expenditures
Conservative	Rob Nicholson	27,235	42.1	-11.16	–
Liberal	Ron Planche	22,318	34.5	+15.59	–
New Democratic	Carolynn Ioannoni	13,525	20.9	-2.59	–
Green	Steven Soos	1,633	2.5	-1.36	–
Total valid votes/Expense limit		64,711	100.0		$249,861.38
Total rejected ballots		353	0.34	-0.15	
Turnout		65,064	63.93;	+7.03	
Eligible voters		102,606			
Conservative hold		Swing		-13.38	
Source: Elections Canada

2011 Canadian federal election
Party	Candidate	Votes	%	±%	Expenditures
Conservative	Rob Nicholson	28,748	53.26	+6.56	–
New Democratic	Heather Kelley	12,681	23.49	+5.63	–
Liberal	Bev Hodgson	10,206	18.91	-8.00	–
Green	Shawn Willick	2,086	3.86	-4.61	–
Christian Heritage	Harold Jonker	259	0.5%	+0.48	–
Total valid votes		53,980	100.00	–	
Total rejected ballots		264	0.49	-0.01	
Turnout		54,244	56.90	+2.30	
Eligible voters		95,326	–	–	

2008 Canadian federal election
Party	Candidate	Votes	%	±%	Expenditures
Conservative	Rob Nicholson	24,016	46.70%	+6.3%	$77,050
Liberal	Joyce Morocco	13,867	26.96%	-7.5%	$89,565
New Democratic	Eric Gillespie	9,186	17.86%	-3.1%	$18,513
Green	Shawn Willick	4,356	8.47%	+4.4%	$7,974
Total valid votes/Expense limit		51,425	99.5%	$94,533	
Total rejected ballots		264	0.5%		
Turnout		51,689	54.60%		

2006 Canadian federal election
Party	Candidate	Votes	%	±%
Conservative	Rob Nicholson	23,489	40.4%	+1.7%
Liberal	Gary Burroughs	20,099	34.5%	-2.0%
New Democratic	Wayne Gates	12,214	21.0%	+0.2%
Green	Kay Green	2,402	4.1%	+0.1%
Total valid votes		58,204	100.0%	

2004 Canadian federal election
Party	Candidate	Votes	%	±%
Conservative	Rob Nicholson	19,882	38.7%	-7.7%
Liberal	Victor Pietrangelo	18,745	36.5%	-9.4%
New Democratic	Wayne Gates	10,680	20.8%	+14.7%
Green	Ted Mousseau	2,071	4.0%	+2.7%
Total valid votes		51,378	100.0%	

Note: Conservative vote is compared to the total of the Canadian Alliance vote and Progressive Conservative vote in 2000 election.

1997 Canadian federal election
Party	Candidate	Votes	%	±%
Liberal	Gary Pillitteri	15,868	38.4%	-8.7%
Reform	Mel Grunstein	10,986	26.6%	+1.6%
Progressive Conservative	Rob Nicholson	9,935	24.0%	+1.7%
New Democratic	John Cowan	4,052	9.8%	+6.4%
Green	Alexander Rados	374	0.9%	+0.3%
Natural Law	Bill Amos	154	0.4%	0.0%
Total valid votes		41,369	100.0%	

1993 Canadian federal election
Party	Candidate	Votes	%	±%
Liberal	Gary Pillitteri	20,542	47.1%	+12.1%
Reform	Mel Grunstein	10,890	25.0%	
Progressive Conservative	Rob Nicholson	9,719	22.3%	-17.2%
New Democratic	Steve Leonard	1,470	3.4%	-18.0%
National	John Cowan	513	1.2%	
Green	John Bruce McBurney	258	0.6%	
Natural Law	Bill Amos	166	0.4%	
Abolitionist	Ted Wiwchar	82	0.2%	
Total valid votes		43,640	100.0%	

1988 Canadian federal election
Party	Candidate	Votes	%	±%
Progressive Conservative	Rob Nicholson	17,077	39.5%	-15.6%
Liberal	Gary Pillitteri	15,137	35.0%	+15.2%
New Democratic	Dick Harrington	9,232	21.3%	-2.4%
Christian Heritage	Bill Andres	1,713	4.0%	
Commonwealth of Canada	Jean-Claude Souvray	97	0.2%	
Total valid votes		43,256	100.0%	

1984 Canadian federal election
Party	Candidate	Votes	%	±%
Progressive Conservative	Rob Nicholson	22,852	55.1%	+18.2%
New Democratic	Richard Harrington	9,863	23.8%	+2.6%
Liberal	Al MacBain	8,219	19.8%	-21.3%
Green	Robert G. Scott	352	0.8%	
Social Credit	Earl G. Erb	177	0.4%	-0.1%
Total valid votes		41,463	100.0%	

== See also ==
- List of Knights of Columbus members

Parliament of Canada
Preceded by Al MacBain	Member of Parliament for Niagara Falls; 1984–1993	Succeeded by Gary Pillitteri
Preceded by Gary Pillitteri	Member of Parliament for Niagara Falls; 2004–present	Incumbent
25th Canadian Ministry (1993) – Cabinet of Kim Campbell
Cabinet post (1)
Predecessor	Office	Successor
	Minister of Science; 1993	
Special Cabinet Responsibilities
Predecessor	Title	Successor
	Minister responsible for Small Business; 1993	
28th Canadian Ministry (2006–2015) – Cabinet of Stephen Harper
Special Parliamentary Responsibilities
Predecessor	Title	Successor
Tony Valeri	Leader of the Government in the House of Commons; 2006–2007	Peter Van Loan
Special Cabinet Responsibilities
Predecessor	Title	Successor
Belinda Stronach as Minister responsible for Democratic Renewal	Minister responsible for Democratic Reform; 2006–2007	Peter Van Loan
Cabinet posts (3)
Predecessor	Office	Successor
Vic Toews	Minister of Justice; 2007–2013	Peter MacKay
Peter MacKay	Minister of National Defence; 2013–2015	Jason Kenney
Ed Fast; Acting	Minister of Foreign Affairs; 2015	Stéphane Dion
