= Thomas Ballantyne (politician) =

Canadian politician

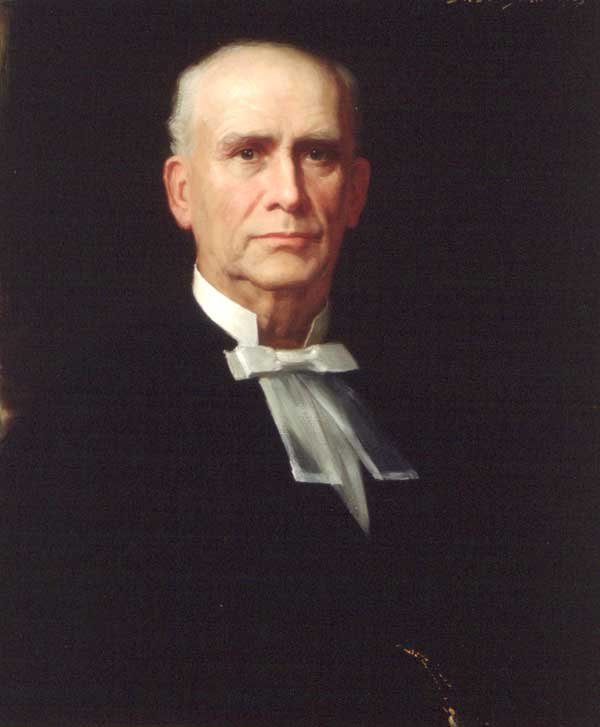

Ontario MPP
- In office 1875–1894
- Preceded by: Thomas B. Guest
- Succeeded by: John McNeill
- Constituency: Perth South

7th Speaker of the Legislative Assembly of Ontario
- In office 1891–1894
- Preceded by: Jacob Baxter
- Succeeded by: William Balfour

Personal details
- Born: August 13, 1829 Peebles, Scotland
- Died: June 29, 1908 (aged 78) Stratford, Ontario
- Party: Liberal
- Spouse: Mary Ballantyne
- Occupation: Businessman

Thomas Ballantyne (August 13, 1829 – June 29, 1908) was a Canadian politician and Speaker of the Ontario Legislature.

Ballantyne was born in Peebles, Scotland, and immigrated to Canada in 1852. He made his fortune as a cheese manufacturer, becoming successful enough to be elected president of the Dairyman's Association. He contested the riding of Perth North in the 1871 provincial election as a Liberal but was defeated. After declining the federal Liberal nomination in the 1872 federal election, he stood in the 1875 provincial election for Perth South and was elected to the Legislative Assembly of Ontario as a Liberal by a margin of 180 votes.

Ballantyne was re-elected on four successive occasions. In 1891, he became Speaker of the legislature and was the first Speaker to preside in the new legislative buildings at Queen's Park. He retired from public life after his defeat in the 1894 provincial election.

== Electoral history ==
1871 Ontario general election: Perth North
| Party | Candidate | Votes | % | ±% |
|---|---|---|---|---|
| Conservative | Andrew Monteith | 1,630 | 57.88 | +0.30 |
| Liberal | Thomas Ballantyne | 1,186 | 42.12 | −0.30 |
| Turnout | | 2,816 | 68.20 | −4.61 |
| Eligible voters | | 4,129 | | |
| Conservative hold | | Swing | | +0.30 |
Source: Elections Ontario

1875 Ontario general election: Perth South
| Party | Candidate | Votes | % | ±% |
|---|---|---|---|---|
| Liberal | Thomas Ballantyne | 1,508 | 53.23 | +3.83 |
| Conservative | G. Leversage | 1,325 | 46.77 | −3.83 |
| Total valid votes | | 2,833 | 70.98 | −1.01 |
| Eligible voters | | 3,991 | | |
| Liberal gain from Conservative | | Swing | | +3.83 |
Source: Elections Ontario

1879 Ontario general election: Perth South
| Party | Candidate | Votes | % | ±% |
|---|---|---|---|---|
| Liberal | Thomas Ballantyne | 1,759 | 55.00 | +1.77 |
| Conservative | Mr. Brunner | 1,439 | 45.00 | −1.77 |
| Total valid votes | | 3,198 | 65.67 | −5.32 |
| Eligible voters | | 4,870 | | |
| Liberal hold | | Swing | | +1.77 |
Source: Elections Ontario
