= Perth South (provincial electoral district) =

Ontario electoral district

Defunct provincial electoral district
- Legislature: Legislative Assembly of Ontario
- District created: 1867
- District abolished: 1933
- First contested: 1867
- Last contested: 1929

Perth South was an electoral riding in Ontario, Canada. It was created in 1867 at the time of confederation and was abolished in 1933 before the 1934 election.

== Members of Provincial Parliament ==
Perth South
Assembly	Years	Member	Party
1st	1867–1871	James Trow	Liberal
2nd	1871–1874	Thomas B. Guest	Conservative
3rd	1875–1879	Thomas Ballantyne	Liberal
4th	1879–1883	Thomas Ballantyne	Liberal
5th	1883–1886	Thomas Ballantyne	Liberal
6th	1886–1890	Thomas Ballantyne	Liberal
7th	1890–1894	Thomas Ballantyne	Liberal
8th	1894–1898	John McNeill	Liberal-Patron
9th	1898–1899	William Caven Moscrip	Liberal
9th	1899–1902	Samuel Nelson Monteith	Conservative
10th	1902–1904	Valentine Stock	Liberal
11th	1905–1908	Samuel Nelson Monteith	Conservative
12th	1908–1911	Valentine Stock	Liberal
13th	1911–1914	John Bennewies	Conservative
14th	1914–1919	John Bennewies	Conservative
15th	1919–1923	Peter Smith	United Farmers
16th	1923–1926	McCausland Irvine	Conservative
17th	1926–1929	Albert Alexander Colquhoun	Liberal
18th	1929–1930	David Bonis	Conservative
18th	1930–1934	Charles Edward Richardson	Conservative
Sourced from the Ontario Legislative Assembly
Merged into Perth before 1934 election

== Election results ==
Ontario provincial by-election, October 29, 1930 Death of David Bonis
Party	Candidate	Votes	%	±%
Conservative	Charles Edward Richardson	4,050	51.50	+6.77
Liberal–Progressive	George S. Keith	3,814	48.50	–
Total valid votes		7,864	100.00	
Total rejected ballots		–		
Turnout		7,864	–	–
Eligible voters				
Conservative hold		Swing		+3.38
Source: Elections Ontario

1929 Ontario general election
Party	Candidate	Votes	%	±%
Conservative	David Bonis	3,428	44.73	–2.12
Liberal	Albert Alexander Colquhoun	2,182	28.47	–24.67
Progressive Party	William A. McKenzie	2,053	26.79	–
Total valid votes		7,663	99.60	
Total rejected ballots		31	0.40	–0.12
Turnout		7,694	71.07	+0.41
Eligible voters		10,826		
Conservative gain from Liberal		Swing		+11.27
Source: Elections Ontario

1926 Ontario general election
Party	Candidate	Votes	%	±%
Liberal	Albert Alexander Colquhoun	4,176	53.14	–
Conservative	McCausland Irvine	3,682	46.86	–3.48
Total valid votes		7,858	99.48	
Total rejected ballots		41	0.52	–0.13
Turnout		7,899	70.66	+7.15
Eligible voters		11,179		
Liberal gain from Conservative		Swing		–
Source: Elections Ontario

1923 Ontario general election
Party	Candidate	Votes	%	±%
Conservative	McCausland Irvine	3,454	50.34	+14.53
United Farmers	Peter Smith	3,408	49.66	–14.53
Total valid votes		6,862	99.35	
Total rejected ballots		45	0.65	–1.65
Turnout		6,907	63.51	–
Eligible voters		10,876		
Conservative gain from United Farmers		Swing		+14.53
Source: Elections Ontario

Ontario provincial by-election, December 15, 1919 Ministerial by-election, upon appointment as Provincial Treasurer
Party	Candidate	Votes	%	±%
United Farmers	Peter Smith	acclaimed		
Source: Elections Ontario

1919 Ontario general election
Party	Candidate	Votes	%	±%
United Farmers	Peter Smith	5,847	64.20	–
Conservative	Percy T. Coupland	3,261	35.80	–
Total valid votes		9,108	97.69	
Total rejected ballots		215	2.31	–
Turnout		9,323	–	–
Eligible voters				
United Farmers gain from Conservative		Swing		–
Source: Elections Ontario

1914 Ontario general election
Party	Candidate	Votes	%	±%
Conservative	John Bennewies	2,375	52.31	+1.54
Liberal	Dilman Kinsey Erb	2,165	47.69	–1.54
Total valid votes		4,540	100.00	
Total rejected ballots		–		
Turnout		4,540	92.01	+11.55
Eligible voters		4,934		
Conservative hold		Swing		+1.54
Source: Elections Ontario

1911 Ontario general election
Party	Candidate	Votes	%	±%
Conservative	John Bennewies	2,388	50.78	+1.35
Liberal	Valentine Stock	2,315	49.22	–1.35
Total valid votes		4,703	99.70	
Total rejected ballots		14	0.30	–0.28
Turnout		4,717	80.47	–12.71
Eligible voters		5,862		
Conservative gain from Liberal		Swing		+1.35
Source: Elections Ontario

1908 Ontario general election
Party	Candidate	Votes	%	±%
Liberal	Valentine Stock	2,453	50.58	–
Conservative	Samuel Nelson Monteith	2,397	49.42	–
Total valid votes		4,850	99.43	
Total rejected ballots		28	0.57	–
Turnout		4,878	93.18	–
Eligible voters		5,235		
Liberal gain from Conservative		Swing		–
Source: Elections Ontario

Ontario provincial by-election, February 21, 1905 Ministerial by-election, upon appointment as Minister of Agriculture
Party	Candidate	Votes	%	±%
Conservative	Samuel Nelson Monteith	acclaimed		
Source: Elections Ontario

1905 Ontario general election
Party	Candidate	Votes	%	±%
Conservative	Samuel Nelson Monteith	2,555	50.58	+1.31
Liberal	Valentine Stock	2,496	49.42	–1.31
Total valid votes		5,051	99.76	
Total rejected ballots		12	0.24	+0.14
Turnout		5,063	87.11	+5.77
Eligible voters		5,812		
Conservative gain from Liberal		Swing		+1.31
Source: Elections Ontario

1902 Ontario general election
Party	Candidate	Votes	%	±%
Liberal	Valentine Stock	2,486	50.72	+0.80
Conservative	Samuel Nelson Monteith	2,415	49.28	–0.80
Total valid votes		4,901	99.90	
Total rejected ballots		5	0.10	–0.02
Turnout		4,906	81.35	–2.06
Eligible voters		6,031		
Liberal gain from Conservative		Swing		+0.80
Source: Elections Ontario

Ontario provincial by-election, February 28, 1899 Void election
Party	Candidate	Votes	%	±%
Conservative	Samuel Nelson Monteith	2,496	50.08	+1.04
Liberal	Valentine Stock	2,488	49.92	+0.80
Total valid votes		4,984	99.88	
Total rejected ballots		6	0.12	–0.58
Turnout		4,990	83.40	+1.32
Eligible voters		5,983		
Conservative gain from Liberal		Swing		+0.12
Source: Elections Ontario

1898 Ontario general election
Party	Candidate	Votes	%	±%
Liberal	William Caven Moscrip	2,357	49.12	–0.62
Conservative	Samuel Nelson Monteith	2,353	49.04	–
Independent	G. Frame	88	1.83	–
Total valid votes		4,798	99.30	
Total rejected ballots		34	0.70	+0.14
Turnout		4,832	82.08	+6.75
Eligible voters		5,887		
Liberal gain from Liberal-Patrons of Industry		Swing		–0.31
Source: Elections Ontario

1894 Ontario general election
Party	Candidate	Votes	%	±%
Liberal-Patrons of Industry	John McNeill	2,232	50.26	–
Liberal	Thomas Ballantyne	2,209	49.74	–8.45
Total valid votes		4,441	99.44	
Total rejected ballots		25	0.56	+0.07
Turnout		4,466	75.32	+13.78
Eligible voters		5,929		
Liberal-Patrons of Industry gain from Liberal		Swing		–
Source: Elections Ontario

1890 Ontario general election
Party	Candidate	Votes	%	±%
Liberal	Thomas Ballantyne	2,241	58.19	+2.93
Conservative Equal Rights	W. R. Davis	1,610	41.81	–
Total valid votes		3,851	99.51	
Total rejected ballots		19	0.49	–0.15
Turnout		3,870	61.55	–10.72
Eligible voters		6,288		
Liberal hold		Swing		+1.47
Source: Elections Ontario

1886 Ontario general election
Party	Candidate	Votes	%	±%
Liberal	Thomas Ballantyne	2,385	55.26	+1.91
Conservative	G. Leversage	1,931	44.74	–1.91
Total valid votes		4,316	99.36	
Total rejected ballots		28	0.64	+0.09
Turnout		4,344	72.27	+2.39
Eligible voters		6,011		
Liberal hold		Swing		+1.91
Source: Elections Ontario

1883 Ontario general election
Party	Candidate	Votes	%	±%
Liberal	Thomas Ballantyne	1,712	53.35	–1.65
Conservative	W. R. Davis	1,497	46.65	+1.65
Total valid votes		3,209	99.44	
Total rejected ballots		18	0.56	+0.56
Turnout		3,227	69.88	+4.21
Eligible voters		4,618		
Liberal hold		Swing		–1.65
Source: Elections Ontario

1879 Ontario general election
Party	Candidate	Votes	%	±%
Liberal	Thomas Ballantyne	1,759	55.00	+1.77
Conservative	Mr. Brunner	1,439	45.00	−1.77
Total valid votes		3,198	65.67	−5.32
Eligible voters		4,870		
Liberal hold		Swing		+1.77
Source: Elections Ontario

1875 Ontario general election
Party	Candidate	Votes	%	±%
Liberal	Thomas Ballantyne	1,508	53.23	+3.83
Conservative	G. Leversage	1,325	46.77	−3.83
Total valid votes		2,833	70.98	−1.01
Eligible voters		3,991		
Liberal gain from Conservative		Swing		+3.83
Source: Elections Ontario

1871 Ontario general election
Party	Candidate	Votes	%	±%
Conservative	Thomas B. Guest	1,302	50.60	+7.16
Liberal	James Trow	1,271	49.40	−7.16
Turnout		2,573	71.99	−8.17
Eligible voters		3,574		
Conservative gain from Liberal		Swing		+7.16
Source: Elections Ontario

1867 Ontario general election
Party	Candidate	Votes	%
Liberal	James Trow	1,552	56.56
Conservative	J.A. Donovan	1,192	43.44
Total valid votes		2,744	80.16
Eligible voters		3,423	
Liberal pickup new district.			
Source: Elections Ontario
