= Marion Oliver =

Canadian female doctor

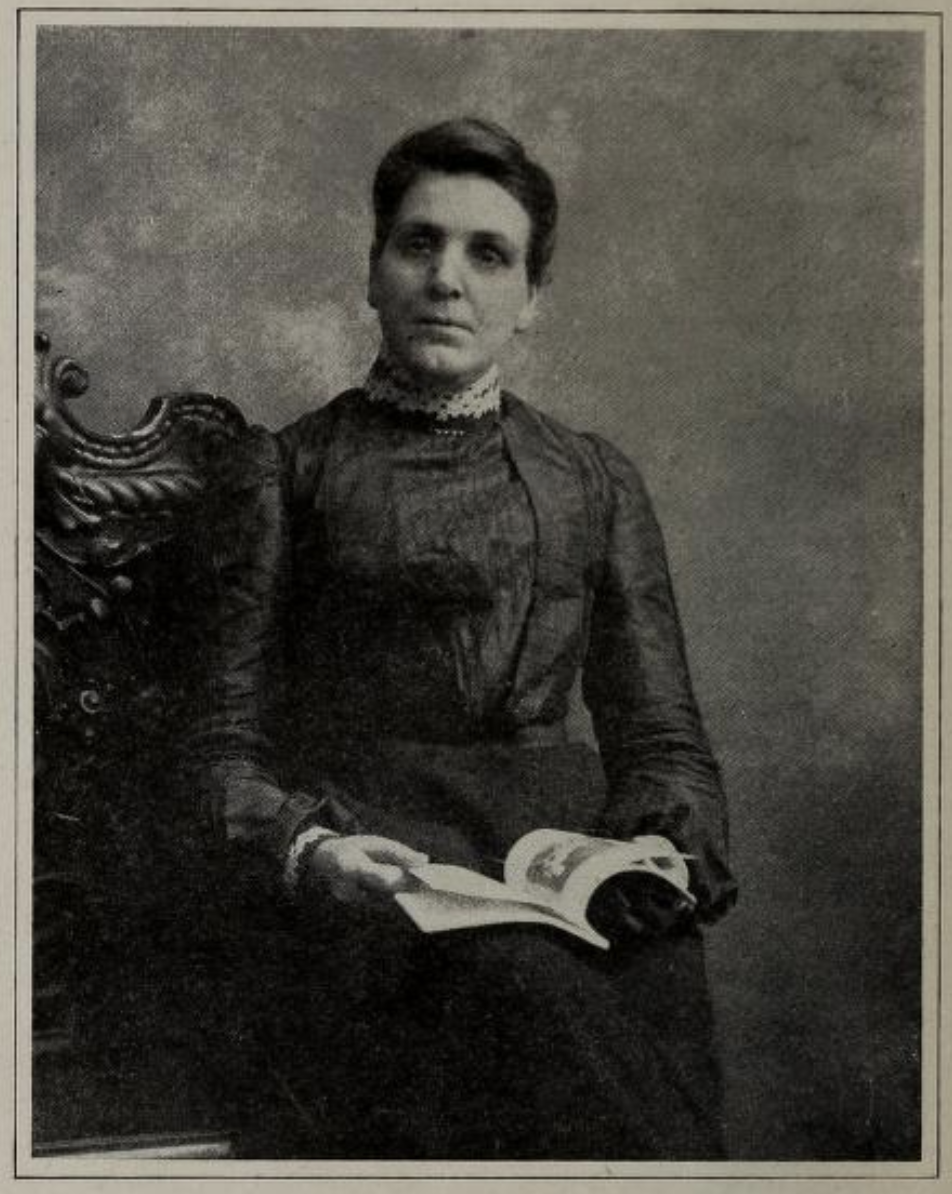
Dr. Marion Oliver, c. 1890

Marion Oliver (May 4, 1853 – May 23, 1913) was a Canadian physician, who graduated in 1886 from the Women’s Medical College at Queen's University, in Kingston, Ontario, the first university women's medical school in Canada. She was the second female medical missionary sent by the Canadian Presbyterian Foreign Missionary Society, sailing to India on October 7, 1886. Oliver worked with and studied under both Emily Stowe and Jennie Trout the first licensed female physicians in Canada. Oliver co-founder and later superintendent of a medical missionary hospital for women in Indore, India.

== Early life ==
Oliver was born in 1853 in Downie, Perth County, Canada West, (now Ontario) to immigrant parents, Adam Oliver and Marion Elliot. Coming from Langholm, Scotland in 1842, Oliver's parents were early European settlers in Perth County, first in the town of Avonton, Canada West, (now Ontario) and then on a homestead near St. Marys, ON.

Oliver was the seventh of ten children. Her childhood was spent working on the family's homestead, where she was described by her sister: "She delighted, for the spice of danger, in walking the rafters of the barn and the railings of bridges. When driving the cattle to and from the pasture, she used often to mount an old white steer."

== Education ==
Oliver's mother, Marion Elliot was an avid reader, which seems to have influenced Oliver's own interest in reading. Borrowing books from a library at the nearby Avonbank Presbyterian church, "the whole family acquired a taste for reading good books on a variety of subjects."

Like many white, European children of the 19th century, Oliver attended rural public school. Unlike many female children for the period, Oliver graduated from high school, attending St. Marys Collegiate Institute, St. Marys, ON.

After graduation, she took "out a [teacher's] certificate" and "began teaching and did excellent work for a number of years, as a Public School teacher in rural sections in the County of Perth."

A significant influence on Oliver's next step in education came on reading the biography of Mary Lyon, an American educator, who founded the Mount Holyoke Female Seminary in 1837 in Massachusetts. The biography inspired Oliver to seek a means for missionary work, so that “her life also should count for truth and righteousness.” She "resolved that her life also should emulate Mary Lyons', and be spent in noble service for others, and should count for truth and righteouness [sic], and for the uplift of womankind."

As such, she then set out to become a physician and to use her medical degree as a means for missionary work for the Foreign Mission Committee of the Presbyterian Church in Canada, through her local church in Avonbank. This was no easy feat, as there were limited options for women in the 1880s to attend medical school in Canada. After the Toronto Medical College "wd not [would not] come to terms" with her, she applied and was accepted to the medical school at Kingston.

In 1882, with tuition of approximately $55.00, Oliver was accepted into the medical school at Queen's University, Kingston. On arriving at Kingston on October 7, 1882, an instructor, Elizabeth Smith, describes her impression of Oliver: "Miss Oliver is excellent & I foretell a good student..."

Oliver acquired her "medical knowledge in the teeth of not a little opposition" and graduated with honours and as class valedictorian in 1886.

== Queen's University's Women's Medical College ==
Oliver's time at the Queen's University was tumultuous, fraught with misogyny, mistreatment, and segregation. Male students and faculty treatment of female student reflected the deep misogyny within higher education at Queen's as well as in Canada more generally. This misogyny, popularized in Canada by Historica Canada's video, Jennie Trout and recorded in the diaries of Elizabeth Smith, rallied temperance and women's suffrage forces across Canada. Smith wrote in November 1882,

No-one knows or can know what a furnace we are passing through these days at the College. We suffer torment, we shrink inwardly, we are hurt cruelly…It is that encouraged current through the class of whispers, innuendo, derisive treading, the turning of what was never meant as unseemly into horrible meanings, and the thousand and one ways that can be devised by evil minds to bring responsive smiles from their own kind.

Oliver participated in the protests along with her fellow students and female faculty against the institutional misogyny and segregation. In December 9, 1882, "the ladies" rose up as "a group" and left the classroom in protest, and Smith and the other female faculty began "boycotting their lectures, and a standoff ensued." As a result, the male students "petitioned the university and demanded co-education be discontinued."

The situation was widely reported in the newspapers both in Canada and the US. Oliver's actions against the school was also noticed. On returning home on holiday from school in December 1882, Oliver was met with great support: "Miss Oliver when home met with almost an ovation, was made a heroine in Stratford, St. Mary's & Toronto & finds we have more sympathy than we ever dreamed of." She spent time in Stratford, ON meeting with potential students, specifically "two young ladies...who intended to come to K. [Kingston] next session."

During this period, in the midst of the tumult, Oliver received a telegram on February 23, 1883, stating that her father was ill. She returned home, but he had died before she could see him again.

Eventually, the female students were forced out of the medical school in 1882, the first year of Oliver's studies. The result was the quick creation of the Women's Medical College in response to the actions of Queen's, which was loosely affiliated with Queen's. Here, the female students were segregated from the main lectures and teaching. Though Oliver graduated from this new college in 1886, the school was eventually forced to close in 1894 due to a lack of funding. Female student were not again admitted to the Queen's medical school until 1943.

In 1884, Oliver was given the school's McNee's Scholarship, the awarding of which said, "the same marked success that attended Miss Oliver for several years as a teacher characterizes her efforts in her new sphere. Natural ability, ambition, and concentration of effort must succeed."

== Missionary work ==
In 1886, Oliver sailed for India with the intention of working as a missionary in Indore, India.

"Dr. Marion Oliver, our medical missionary sailed for India on Thursday, 7th October, by steamship 'Polynesian.'"

=== Elizabeth Rabb Beatty ===
The Canadian Presbyterian mission in Indore had been established in 1877, with its first female physician, Elizabeth Rabb Beatty (1856-1939) arriving in 1884. Beatty and Oliver were students together at Queen's medical school, with Beatty graduating in 1883. By a student at Queen's she was described as, "largest in size, determination in every feature, good nature sparkling in her eyes casts a protecting shade on us in her stately size something like the fighting editor."

On Beatty's travels to Indore, she met onboard Lady Dufferin, who was en route to India for the purpose of establishing secular medical institution in India. Lady Dufferin had been "commissioned by Queen Victoria to establish medical services for Indian women, and though her mandate was to foster strictly secular institutions, she was naturally interested in Dr. Beatty's future work as a medical missionary." Her husband, Earl of Dufferin, was a Governor General of Canada (1872-1878).

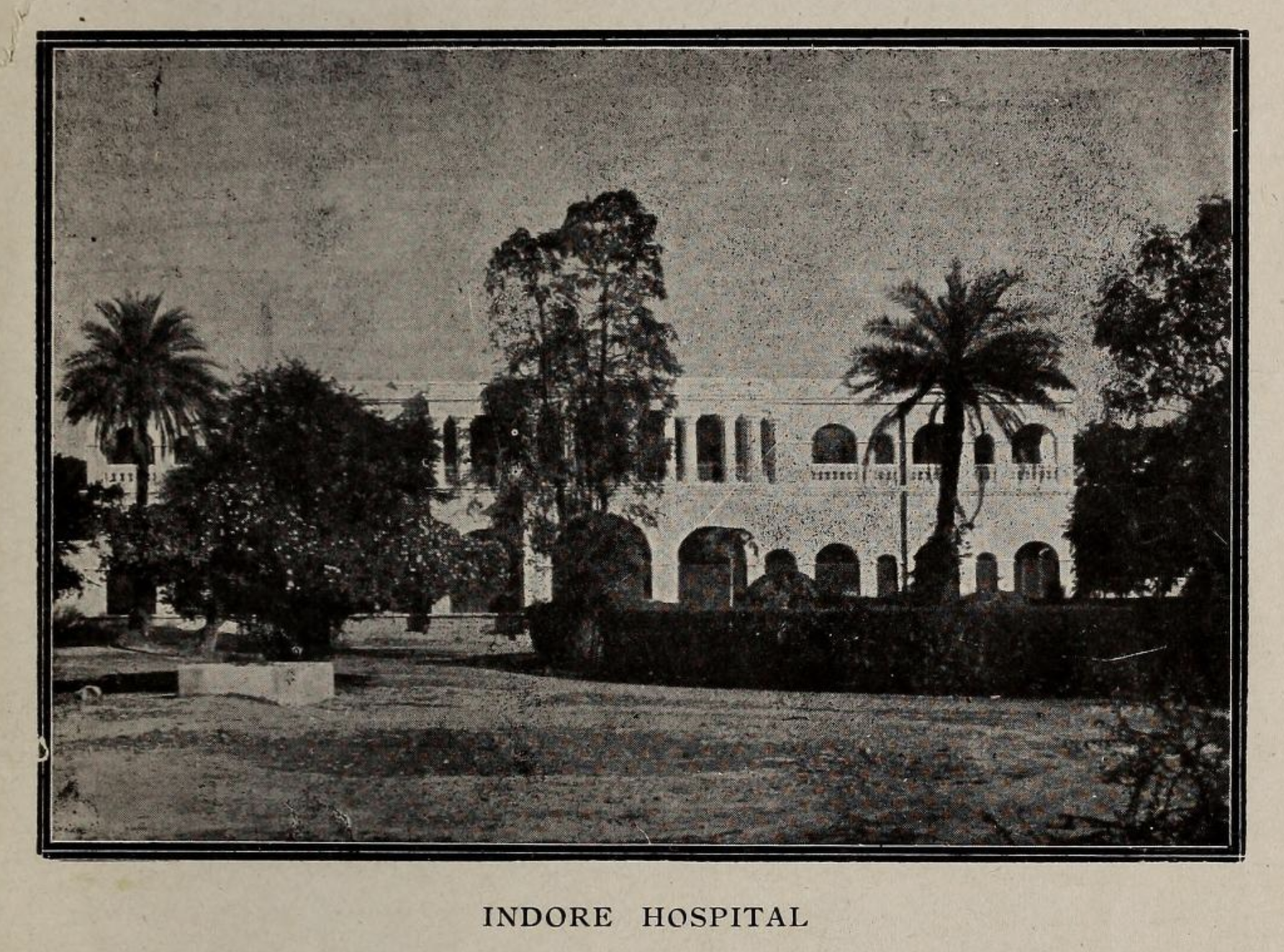
Women's Hospital in Indore, India, c. 1888

Beatty first work was to establish a dispensary in Indore, which, at the arrival of Oliver, consisted of a "big waiting room where the women who came for medicine assembled" with "[a]djoining the waiting room were other smaller rooms for consulting, dispensing medicine, etc." As the dispensary came to provide care for upper caste women, its influence grew, serving more than 1500 patients a month. This led, in 1888, to the "dowager Maharani of Indore offered the mission land on which to build a hospital for women." In 1891, a new women's hospital was completed. Oliver wrote,

We cannot omit to inform Your Excellency, that in this work we have been ably seconded by our friends in India. H.H. the Maharajah Holkar has kindly granted us the magnificent site on which the building stands, together with the gift of Rs.750 and the promise of a much needed addition to our grounds in the rear...This building is in every way complete: private and public wards, dispensing and operating rooms all furnished with every needed appliance. It is conducted on the strictest of purdah system, and caste prejudices are respected.

By 1897, the hospital

contained forty-five beds, besides a private and an isolation ward. In her last official report, the doctor recorded the treatment in 1910 of 387 in-patients, 6,114 out-patients, and the performance of no less than 315 operations.

Oliver became superintendent of the hospital by 1902. Around 1890, Beatty and Oliver established a medical dispensary in Ujjain, India, "about three hours" away by train. Oliver describes the new medical facility,

A nice large room with a small adjoining room was secured for us. So two weeks ago I went up, taking with me a stock of medicine, and a Christian woman who has had two years training in the Agra Women's Medical School. Her husband has been for some time in charge of the missionary dispensary for men at Ujjain, so the husband and wife are now both at work side by side, and ought to be able to help each other. We have put her in charge of the dispensary and shall endeavor to visit it frequently. Ujjain is a city of some 50,000 inhabitants and so closely are the houses built together that only very few of the streets are wide enough for a cart to go through. I had to ride on horseback, and created no little curiosity, though they seemed to find out who I was for I could hear them saying to one another as I passed along: — 'Doctor Madam Sahiba.' Our first morning we had more than a dozen patients and the second twenty, which we felt to be a very encouraging beginning.

Oliver wrote of the people of India:

The more I know of the women of India the more do I realize that to get them to understand and believe that I have real love for and interest in them I must be ready to waste time over them.

Beatty's health began to deteriorate in 1887, and she was forced to return to Canada in 1891. This resulted in Oliver taking on an increasing amount of the labour and responsibility for both the hospital in Indore, as well as the dispensary in Ujjain. In 1888, she was also asked to take on oversight of the Presbyterian Girls' School in Indore.

Oliver travelled to Canada on furlough in 1891 and 1911.

On the passage in 1911, the ship, Asia, "was wrecked on a ledge of rock soon after leaving Hongkong." Oliver survived, uninjured.

== Later life and death ==
In 1904, Oliver was transferred to work in Ujjain and then again to Indore in 1906, and then back to Ujjain in 1907. In 1911, after 25 year in India, Oliver returned the Canada, expecting to stay for a year.

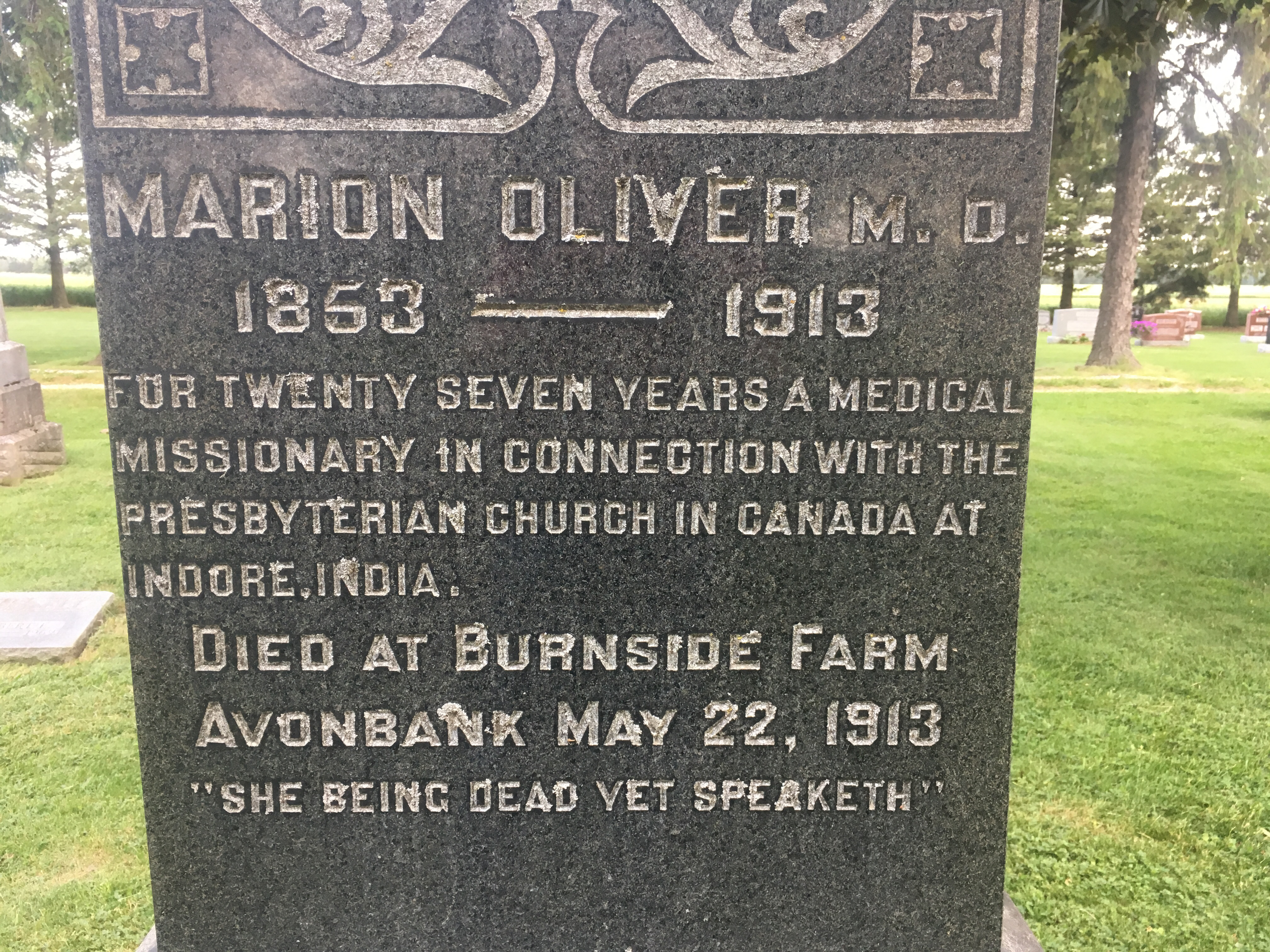
Headstone of Dr Marion Oliver (1853-1913)

During this time, Oliver met with the young women of the surrounding area of Avonbank and St Marys,

these young members of the Avonbank congregation she sought to give them the world-vision that had been vouchsafed to her. The meetings were always interesting, the subjects for study carefully prepared, and at the end of the study it was her custom to sum up in a few trenchant words all that had been expressed by the young speakers. This deep interest in the young folk of the congregation, and the influence of her life and work among them led one of the young ladies, after Dr. Oliver's last furlough, to offer for service in the foreign field, and Miss Jennie Hotson was appointed to work in our Mission in Formosa.

Marion Oliver died of nephritis at Burnside Farm on May 23, 1913 in Avonbank, ON, her death widely reported in Canada. She was 60 years of age.
