= Perth South (federal electoral district) =

Former federal electoral district in Ontario, Canada

Ontario electoral district

Defunct federal electoral district
- Legislature: House of Commons
- District created: 1867
- District abolished: 1933
- First contested: 1867
- Last contested: 1930

Perth South was a federal electoral district represented in the House of Commons of Canada from 1867 to 1935. It was located in the province of Ontario. It was created by the British North America Act 1867, which divided the County of Perth into two ridings. The South Riding of the County of Perth initially consisted of the Townships of Blanchard, Downie, South Easthope, Fullarton, Hibbert, and the Villages of Mitchell and St. Marys.

In 1882, the townships of Usborne were added to the riding, and that of South Easthope was excluded. In 1903, Usborne was removed from the riding, and Easthope South and Logan townships were added. In 1914, the part of the village of Tavistock situated in the township of Easthope South was added.

In 1924, Perth South was defined to consist of the part of the county of Perth lying south of and including the townships of Logan, Fullerton and Downie, south of but excluding the city of Stratford, south of but including the township of Easthope South to the east boundary of the said county. That part of Tavistock lying in the township of Easthope South was also included.

The electoral district was abolished in 1933 when it was redistributed between Huron—Perth and Perth ridings.

== Members of Parliament ==
This riding has elected the following members of Parliament:

Parliament	Years	Member	Party
1st	1867–1872	Robert MacFarlane	Liberal
2nd	1872–1874	James Trow	Liberal
3rd	1874–1878	James Trow	Liberal
4th	1878–1882	James Trow	Liberal
5th	1882–1887	James Trow	Liberal
6th	1887–1891	James Trow	Liberal
7th	1891–1892	James Trow	Liberal
7th	1892–1896	William Pridham	Conservative
8th	1896–1900	Dilman Kinsey Erb	Liberal
9th	1900–1904	Dilman Kinsey Erb	Liberal
10th	1904–1908	Gilbert Howard McIntyre	Liberal
11th	1908–1911	Gilbert Howard McIntyre	Liberal
12th	1911–1917	Michael Steele	Conservative
13th	1917–1921	Michael Steele	Government (Unionist)
14th	1921–1925	William Forrester	Liberal
15th	1925–1926	Fred Sanderson	Liberal
16th	1926–1930	Fred Sanderson	Liberal
17th	1930–1935	Fred Sanderson	Liberal
Riding dissolved into Perth and Huron—Perth

== Election history ==
1867 Canadian federal election: South Riding of the County of Perth
Party	Candidate	Votes
Liberal	Robert MacFarlane	1,490
Unknown	Thomas B. Guest	1,393
Eligible voters		1,393
Source: Canadian Parliamentary Guide, 1871

1872 Canadian federal election: South Riding of the County of Perth
Party	Candidate	Votes
Liberal	James Trow	1,683
Unknown	J. Kidd	1,256

1874 Canadian federal election: South Riding of the County of Perth
Party	Candidate	Votes
Liberal	James Trow	acclaimed

1878 Canadian federal election: South Riding of the County of Perth
Party	Candidate	Votes
Liberal	James Trow	1,796
Unknown	E. Hornibrook	1,719

1882 Canadian federal election: South Riding of the County of Perth
Party	Candidate	Votes
Liberal	James Trow	1,896
Unknown	Thomas B. Guest	1,717

1887 Canadian federal election: South Riding of the County of Perth
Party	Candidate	Votes
Liberal	James Trow	2,224
Conservative	H. F. Sharp	2,131

1891 Canadian federal election: South Riding of the County of Perth
Party	Candidate	Votes
Liberal	James Trow	2,363
Conservative	H. F. Sharp	2,186

By-election: On election being declared void, 10 March 1892: South Riding of the County of Perth
Party	Candidate	Votes
Conservative	William Pridham	acclaimed

1896 Canadian federal election: South Riding of the County of Perth
Party	Candidate	Votes
Liberal	D. K. Erb	2,069
Conservative	William Pridham	1,851
Protestant Protective	J. A. Donald	551

1900 Canadian federal election: South Riding of the County of Perth
Party	Candidate	Votes
Liberal	Dilman Kinsey Erb	2,169
Conservative	William Pridham	2,160

1904 Canadian federal election: South Riding of the County of Perth
Party	Candidate	Votes
Liberal	Gilbert H. McIntyre	2,454
Conservative	Michael Steele	2,310

1908 Canadian federal election: South Riding of the County of Perth
Party	Candidate	Votes
Liberal	Gilbert Howard McIntyre	2,412
Conservative	Michael Steele	2,383

1911 Canadian federal election: South Riding of the County of Perth
Party	Candidate	Votes
Conservative	Michael Steele	2,303
Liberal	Gilbert Howard McIntyre	2,221

1917 Canadian federal election: South Riding of the County of Perth
Party	Candidate	Votes
Government	Michael Steele	2,770
Opposition	William Forrester	2,713

1921 Canadian federal election: South Riding of the County of Perth
Party	Candidate	Votes
Liberal	William Forrester	3,209
Conservative	Michael Steele	2,948
Progressive	Robert Berry	2,908

1925 Canadian federal election: Perth South
Party	Candidate	Votes
Liberal	Frederick George Sanderson	4,455
Conservative	Robert S. Graham	4,041

1926 Canadian federal election: Perth South
Party	Candidate	Votes
Liberal	Fred George Sanderson	4,966
Conservative	Robert S. Graham	4,451

1930 Canadian federal election: Perth South
Party	Candidate	Votes
Liberal	Frederick George Sanderson	5,063
Conservative	Samuel James Monteith	4,346

== See also ==
- List of Canadian electoral districts
- Historical federal electoral districts of Canada
