= James Corry =

James Corry may refer to:

- James Corry (political scientist) (1899–1985), Canadian academic
- James Corry (Canadian politician) (1895–1968), Canadian Member of Parliament for Perth
- James Corry (Irish politician) (1634–1718), Irish MP for Fermanagh
- Sir James Corry, 1st Baronet (1826–1891), MP for Belfast and Armagh Mid
- Sir James Corry, 3rd Baronet (1892–1987), of the Corry baronets
- Sir James Michael Corry, 5th Baronet (born 1946), of the Corry baronets

== See also ==
- Herbert Cory (Sir James Herbert Cory, 1st Baronet, 1857–1933), Welsh politician and ship-owner
- James Corey (disambiguation)
- Corry (disambiguation)
