= Tony Baldinelli =

Canadian politician (born 1964)

Tony Baldinelli MP

Member of Parliament for Niagara Falls—Niagara-on-the-Lake Niagara Falls (2019–2025)
- Incumbent
- Assumed office October 21, 2019
- Preceded by: Rob Nicholson

Personal details
- Born: November 24, 1964 (age 61) Niagara Falls, Ontario, Canada
- Party: Conservative Party of Canada

Tony Baldinelli MP (born November 24, 1964) is a Canadian politician who has represented the riding of Niagara Falls in the House of Commons of Canada since winning the 2019 Canadian federal election. He held the seat for the Tories after its long-serving member of Parliament, former cabinet minister Rob Nicholson, retired. Prior to being elected, he had worked at Niagara Parks for 18 years. In September 2020, Conservative leader Erin O'Toole named Baldinelli his special adviser on Tourism Recovery.

== Politics ==
=== Federal politics ===
In the 44th Parliament, Baldinelli tabled Private Member's Bill C-342, titled '"An Act to amend the Corrections and Conditional Release Act (maximum security offenders)". The bill did not progress past the first reading. Baldinelli also jointly-seconded C-313, An Act to amend the Criminal Code (justification for detention in custody) and C-266, An Act to amend the Excise Act and the Excise Act, 2001 (adjusted duties - beer, malt liquor, spirits and wine).

Baldinelli is the current Conservative Shadow Minister for Tourism.

== Electoral history ==
2025 Canadian federal election: Niagara Falls—Niagara-on-the-Lake
Party	Candidate	Votes	%	±%	Expenditures
Conservative	Tony Baldinelli	29,774	49.14	+11.72	$132,995.30
Liberal	Andrea Kaiser	27,194	44.88	+9.69	$131,857.54
New Democratic	Shannon Mitchell	2,335	3.85	–14.00	$6,303.58
Green	Celia Taylor	518	0.85	–1.10	$0.00
People's	Dinah Althorpe	481	0.79	–6.79	$240.15
Libertarian	Daniel Shakhmundes	160	0.26	N/A	none listed
Centrist	Yawar Anwar	128	0.21	N/A	$0.00
Total valid votes/expense limit		61,058	99.25	–	$136,596.39
Total rejected ballots		463	0.75		
Turnout		61,521	67.56		
Eligible voters		91,058			
Conservative notional hold		Swing		+1.02	
Source: Elections Canada

2021 Canadian federal election: Niagara Falls
Party	Candidate	Votes	%	±%	Expenditures
Conservative	Tony Baldinelli	26,810	37.9	+2.4	$111,535.19
Liberal	Andrea Kaiser	23,650	33.5	+1.0	$114,330.02
New Democratic	Brian Barker	12,871	18.2	+0.2	$22,072.98
People's	Peter Taras	5,948	8.4	+7.0	$43,091.46
Green	Melanie Holm	1,370	1.9	-3.0	$1,799.97
Total valid votes		70,649	99.1		
Total rejected ballots		646	0.9		
Turnout		71,295	62.2		
Eligible voters		114,698			
Conservative hold		Swing		+0.7	
Source: Elections Canada

2019 Canadian federal election: Niagara Falls
Party	Candidate	Votes	%	±%	Expenditures
Conservative	Tony Baldinelli	24,751	35.49	-6.59	$99,463.10
Liberal	Andrea Kaiser	22,690	32.54	-1.95	$88,011.69
New Democratic	Brian Barker	12,566	18.02	-2.88	$17,190.50
Independent	Mike Strange	4,997	7.17	-	none listed
Green	Sandra O'Connor	3,404	4.88	+2.36	$7,271.20
People's	Alexander Taylor	968	1.39	-	none listed
Christian Heritage	Tricia O'Connor	358	0.51	-	none listed
Total valid votes/expense limit		69,734	99.10		
Total rejected ballots		636	0.90	+0.36	
Turnout		70,370	62.15	-0.84	
Eligible voters		113,232			
Conservative hold		Swing		-2.32	
Source: Elections Canada

2000 Canadian federal election
Party	Candidate	Votes	%	±%
Liberal	Gary Pillitteri	17,907	45.9%	+7.6%
Alliance	Mel Grunstein	11,999	30.8%	+4.2%
Progressive Conservative	Tony Baldinelli	6,077	15.6%	-8.4%
New Democratic	Ed Booker	2,356	6.0%	-3.8%
Green	Clara Tarnoy	501	1.3%	+0.4%
Natural Law	Bill Amos	155	0.4%	0.0%
Total valid votes		38,995	100.0%	

Note: Canadian Alliance vote is compared to the Reform vote in 1997 election.
