= Roger Young (politician) =

Canadian politician

Roger Carl Young

Member of Parliament for Niagara Falls
- In office 1974–1979
- Preceded by: Joe Hueglin
- Succeeded by: Jake Froese

Personal details
- Born: March 7, 1941 (age 85) Niagara Falls, Ontario, Canada
- Party: Liberal
- Profession: Lawyer

Roger Carl Young (born March 7, 1941, in Niagara Falls, Ontario, Canada) is a former Canadian politician and lawyer, who served in the House of Commons of Canada from 1974 to 1979 as a member of the Liberal Party representing the riding of Niagara Falls.

First elected in the 1974 Canadian federal election, he was Parliamentary Secretary to the Minister of Justice and Attorney General of Canada (1977–78) and Parliamentary Secretary to the Solicitor General of Canada (1978–79).

He also sat on various standing committees including the Standing Committee on Agriculture, Standing Committee on Broadcasting, Films and Assistance to the Arts, Standing Committee on Fisheries and Forestry, Standing Committee on Indian Affairs and Northern Development, Standing Committee on Labour, Manpower and Immigration and the Standing Committee on National Resources and Public Works.

Prior to being elected in 1974, he served as a special assistant and later executive assistant to Joe Greene, Minister of Energy, Mines and Resources, Canada (1968–70). Following his defeat in 1979, he served as chief of staff to Yvon Pinard, president of the Queen's Privy Council for Canada and Government House Leader (1981–84). He then joined the Public Service Staff Relations Board as a member/adjudicator of federal labour disputes between the Treasury Board and the major public service unions (1984-1991), following which he entered private practice as a consensual arbitrator, mediator and investigator of workplace harassment complaints. He has been more or less retired since 2009.
