= Jake Froese =

Canadian politician

Member of Parliament
- In office 1979–1980
- Preceded by: Roger Young
- Succeeded by: Al MacBain
- Constituency: Niagara Falls

Lord Mayor of Niagara-on-the-Lake
- In office 1973–1978
- Preceded by: Fred Goring
- Succeeded by: Wilbert Dick

Personal details
- Born: September 21, 1925
- Died: January 16, 2013 (aged 87)
- Party: Progressive Conservative
- Children: Tom Froese

Jake Froese (September 21, 1925 - January 16, 2013) was a Canadian politician, who served as a Progressive Conservative party member of the House of Commons of Canada in the 31st Canadian Parliament. He represented the Niagara Falls electoral district after winning the seat in the 1979 federal election, but was defeated in the 1980 election by Al MacBain of the Liberal party.

Prior to his election to Parliament, Froese was a longtime municipal politician in Niagara-on-the-Lake, who was first elected to the municipal council in 1968 and later served as the town's Lord Mayor from 1973 to 1978.

His son Tom Froese later served in the Legislative Assembly of Ontario from 1995 to 1999.

== Archives ==
There is a Jake Froese fonds at Library and Archives Canada. Archival reference number is R5288.
