= Thomas Guest =

Thomas Guest may refer to:

- Thomas B. Guest (1816–1884), Ontario political figure
- Thomas Douglas Guest (1781–1845), British historical and portrait painter
- Tom Guest, English rugby union player
