= Gilbert Howard McIntyre =

Canadian politician

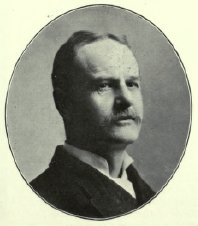

Member of the Canadian Parliament for Perth South
- In office 1904–1911
- Preceded by: Dilman Kinsey Erb
- Succeeded by: Michael Steele

Personal details
- Born: February 17, 1852 St. Mary's, Canada West
- Died: December 1, 1913 (aged 61)
- Party: Liberal

Gilbert Howard McIntyre (February 17, 1852 – December 1, 1913) was a Canadian politician.

Born in St. Mary's, Canada West, the son of George Maclntyre and Margaret Howard, McIntyre was educated at St. Mary's Grammar School and the Ontario College of Pharmacy in Toronto. A pharmacist, he was also a private banker and an exporter of Canadian produce. He has been member of the Municipal Council and Mayor of St. Mary's. He was first elected to the House of Commons of Canada at the general elections of 1904 for the electoral district of Perth South. A Liberal, he was re-elected in 1908 and was defeated in 1911. From 1909 to 1911, he was the Deputy Speaker and Chairman of Committees of the Whole of the House of Commons.

Political offices
Preceded by Charles Marcil	Deputy Speaker and Chairman of Committees of the Whole of the House of Commons; 1909–1911	Succeeded by Pierre Édouard Blondin
