= Albert Bradshaw =

Canadian politician, businessman and farmer

Albert James Bradshaw
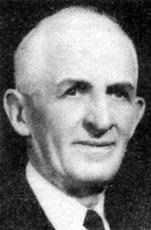

Member of the Canadian Parliament for Perth
- In office 1945–1949
- Preceded by: Frederick George Sanderson
- Succeeded by: James Neilson Corry

Personal details
- Born: 18 December 1882 Downie Township, Ontario, Canada
- Died: 6 January 1956 (aged 73)
- Party: Progressive Conservative Party
- Occupation: Businessman, farmer

Albert James Bradshaw (18 December 1882 – January 1956) was a Canadian politician, businessman and farmer. He was elected to the House of Commons of Canada as a Member of the Progressive Conservative Party in the 1945 election to represent the riding of Perth. He was defeated in the 1949 election.
