= William Forrester (politician) =

Canadian politician

Member of Parliament for Perth South
- In office December 1921 – September 1925
- Preceded by: Michael Steele
- Succeeded by: Fred Sanderson

Personal details
- Born: 16 March 1855 St. Marys, Canada West
- Died: 23 October 1926 (aged 71)
- Party: Liberal
- Profession: farmer, manufacturer

William Forrester (16 March 1855 – 23 October 1926) was a Liberal party and Laurier Liberals member of the House of Commons of Canada. He was born in St. Marys, Canada West and became a farmer and manufacturer.

He was first elected to Parliament at the Perth South riding in the 1921 general election after an unsuccessful campaign there in the 1917 election as a Laurier Liberal. After serving his only federal term, the 14th Canadian Parliament, Forrester left the House of Commons and did not seek another term in the 1925 election.
