= Judy LaMarsh Fund =

The Judy LaMarsh Fund is a political fundraising body, established to support female candidates running for federal elected office in Canada. The Fund is an arm of the Liberal Party of Canada. The Fund is named after Judy LaMarsh, the first woman Liberal cabinet minister.

Of the many obstacles that inhibit women from pursuing elected office, financial barriers are the most gendered. It is the living legacy of one of the most distinguished women in Canadian history, who ushered in some of the most progressive legislation of the 1960s.

Every woman candidate running for the Liberal Party of Canada receives support from the Judy LaMarsh Fund. The funds are raised entirely by volunteers.
