= John Bennewies =

Canadian politician

Ontario MPP
- In office 1911–1919
- Preceded by: Valentine Stock
- Succeeded by: Peter Smith
- Constituency: Perth South

Personal details
- Born: November 20, 1863; Logan Township, Canada West
- Died: June 22, 1943 (aged 79); Brodhagen, Ontario
- Political party: Conservative
- Spouse: Sophie Steiss (m. 1887)
- Occupation: Businessman

John Bennewies (November 20, 1863 – June 22, 1943) was an Ontario farmer and political figure. He represented Perth South in the Legislative Assembly of Ontario as a Conservative member from 1914 to 1919.

He was born in Logan Township, Canada West, the son of Ludwig Bennewies, a German immigrant. In 1887, he married Sophie Steiss. Bennewies served as reeve for McKillop and Logan townships. He was president of the Dublin Telephone Company.

Bennewies died at his home in Brodhagen, Ontario in 1943, a year after retiring from the telephone service. He is buried at St. Peters Lutheran Cemetery.
