= Ontario Bond Scandal =

Ontario, Canada political scandal

The Ontario Bond Scandal was a criminal case that was brought against the former Ontario provincial treasurer, Peter Smith and Smith's associates in 1924 and 1925.

Ontario had been governed by the United Farmers of Ontario (UFO) political party, led by Ontario Premier Ernest C. Drury since 1919. In 1920, when Peter Smith was the Ontario Treasurer, the United Farmers leadership contracted with Aemilius Jarvis to acquire and retire three series of previously issued Succession Duty free bonds. The United Farmers lost their control of the provincial government in 1923, when a new Conservative government, led by Howard Ferguson, was elected a year later.

Four years later in 1924, after the United Farmers government had fallen, prosecutors under the new provincial government alleged that former Treasurer Smith and financier Jarvis had conspired with Andrew Harvey ("A.H.") Pepall, Smith's friend and the government's agent for the deal, to inflate the price paid for the bonds and to split the excess profit. An official inquiry discovered that the Jarvis firm had earned some £130,000 (equivalent to £8,966,567 in 2023) pounds in profit from the arrangement. A very large portion of the profit had gone to Pepall as a commission, and a portion of Pepall's commission had been deposited into Smith's bank account. Criminal charges of theft, fraud and conspiracy to defraud were brought against Smith and Jarvis. A.H. Pepall who was then living in California, was not charged, but his brother Harry, and Jarvis's son both of whom worked at the Jarvis firm, were criminally charged.

The only hint of any impropriety before this had arisen in 1922, when a legislative committee had questioned why A.H. Pepall, a close friend of Smith, had been paid the then large sum of $C80 per day for the trip, in which he seemed to have done little actual work.

In October 1924 Smith, Jarvis, his son, and Harry Pepall went on trial. The verdicts were handed down on October 24, 1924. All four were found not guilty of theft and fraud. Harry Pepall and the younger Jarvis were also found not guilty of conspiracy. But, in an illogical twist, the elder Jarvis and Smith were found guilty of conspiracy to defraud the government. Jarvis was sentenced to six months in prison, and Smith received three years. They were each joint and severally liable to pay a fine of CA$600,000 (equivalent to $10,473,333 in 2023), then the largest fines ever imposed in the British Empire. The fines were reduced on appeal and each was made separately liable for their portion.

The next year Andrew Pepall, who was living in California, was extradited. At that time conspiracy was not an extraditable offence, so he could only be brought back to Canada to face charges of theft and receiving the proceeds of a criminal conspiracy. He was found not guilty of these in late 1925.

Aemilius Jarvis -a prominent businessman and sports figure- was convicted on the charge of conspiracy, despite the fact that he had saved the provincial government millions of dollars in the retirement of the Succession Duty free bonds. Released from jail in six months, he spent the remainder of his life protesting his innocence which was proven when he took the stand, in the trial of Andrew Pepall. Jarvis was cleared in the eyes of the public, although his conviction was never overturned, nor was a pardon granted by the courts The Premier of Ontario (from 1919 to 1923), Ernest C. Drury, labelled Jarvis "Canada's Dreyfus," a reference to Alfred Dreyfus (who had been wrongfully charged and jailed in his native France for blatantly political reasons) and the Government of Canada would later be petitioned, unsuccessfully, to pardon Jarvis.
