= David Bonis =

Canadian politician from Ontario

Member of the Ontario Provincial Parliament for Perth South
- In office September 30, 1929 – July 19, 1930
- Preceded by: Albert Alexander Colquhoun
- Succeeded by: Charles Edward Richardson

Personal details
- Died: July 19, 1930
- Party: Conservative

David Bonis (died July 19, 1930) was a Canadian politician from the Conservative Party of Ontario. He represented Perth South in the Legislative Assembly of Ontario from 1929 to 1930.

== See also ==
- 18th Parliament of Ontario
