= J. Waldo Monteith =

Canadian politician

The Honourable J. Waldo Monteith PC FCA
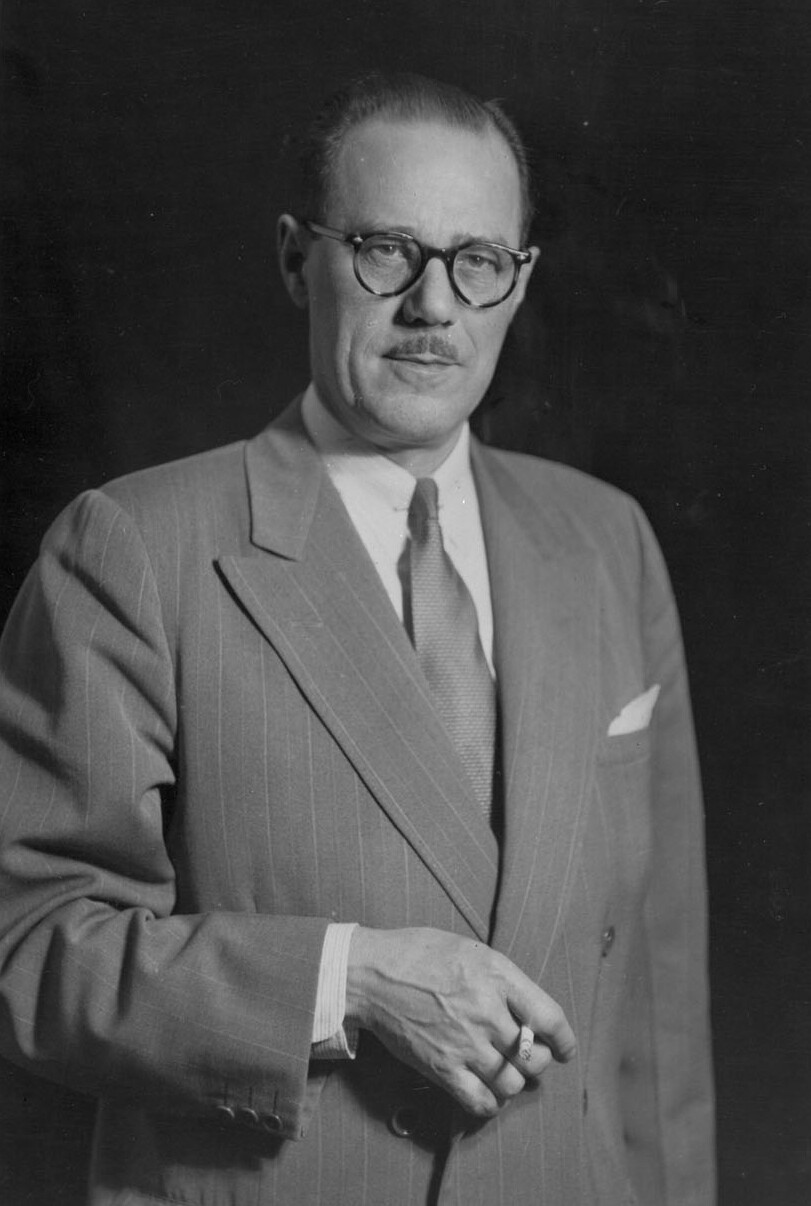

Minister of Amateur Sport
- In office 29 September 1961 – 21 April 1963
- Prime Minister: John Diefenbaker
- Preceded by: Office Established
- Succeeded by: Judy LaMarsh

Minister of National Health and Welfare
- In office 22 August 1957 – 21 April 1963
- Prime Minister: John Diefenbaker
- Preceded by: Alfred Johnson Brooks (Acting)
- Succeeded by: Judy LaMarsh

Member of Parliament for Perth (Perth—Wilmot; 1970–1972)
- In office 10 August 1953 – 29 October 1972
- Preceded by: James Corry
- Succeeded by: William H. Jarvis

Personal details
- Born: Jay Waldo Monteith; 24 June 1903 Stratford, Ontario, Canada
- Died: 19 December 1981 (aged 78) London, Ontario, Canada
- Party: Progressive Conservative
- Spouse: Mary Strudley (m. 1936)
- Relations: Andrew Monteith (grandfather); Joseph Dunsmore Monteith (father)
- Children: 3
- Education: Trinity College, Toronto
- Occupation: Chartered accountant

Jay Waldo Monteith PC FCA (24 June 1903 – 19 December 1981) was a Canadian politician.

Born in Stratford, Ontario, he was the son of Joseph Dunsmore Monteith, an Ontario MPP and cabinet minister, and Allice Chowen. He graduated from the Trinity College, Toronto and became a chartered accountant in 1932. Monteith was first elected to the House of Commons in the 1953 Canadian federal election as a Progressive Conservative Member of Parliament for the riding of Perth, Ontario. He was subsequently re-elected in 1957, 1958, 1962, 1963, 1965, and 1968.

From 1957 to 1963, he served as Minister of National Health and Welfare. In 1961, he was appointed Canada’s first Minister of Amateur Sport, a position he held until 1963.
