= James Trow =

Canadian politician

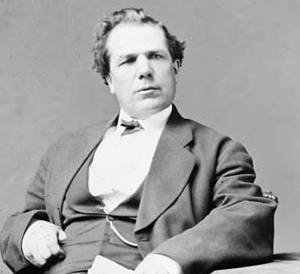

Member of Parliament for Perth South
- In office 1872–1891
- Preceded by: Robert MacFarlane
- Succeeded by: William Pridham

Ontario MPP
- In office 1867–1871
- Preceded by: Riding established
- Succeeded by: Thomas Guest
- Constituency: Perth South

Personal details
- Born: 16 December 1826 Newtown, Wales
- Died: 10 September 1892 (aged 65) Toronto, Ontario, Canada
- Party: Liberal
- Spouse: Mary Moore (m. 1847)
- Occupation: Businessman

James Trow (16 December 1826 – 10 September 1892) was an Ontario businessman and politician. He was a member of the first legislature in Ontario for the riding of Perth South and represented Perth South in the House of Commons of Canada from 1872 to 1891 as a Liberal.

He was born in Newtown, Wales in 1826, was educated in Wales and came to Canada in 1841. He taught school for several years before becoming a broker in real estate. In 1847, he married Mary Moore. He was president of the Crown Mutual Fire Insurance Company, vice-president of the British Mortgage and Loan Company and the Perth Mutual Insurance Association. He was also a director for the Ontario Mutual Life Insurance Company of Waterloo. Trow was warden for Perth County in 1871 and reeve for the township of North Easthope for 21 successive years. Over the years, he served on several parliamentary committees dealing with the railway and printing. His election in 1891 was declared invalid and he did not run in the by-election that followed in 1892.

He died in Toronto later that year. His final resting place is in Stratford, Ontario, close to his riding.

== Electoral history ==
1867 Ontario general election: Perth South
Party	Candidate	Votes	%
Liberal	James Trow	1,552	56.56
Conservative	J.A. Donovan	1,192	43.44
Total valid votes		2,744	80.16
Eligible voters		3,423	
Liberal pickup new district.			
Source: Elections Ontario

1871 Ontario general election: Perth South
Party	Candidate	Votes	%	±%
Conservative	Thomas B. Guest	1,302	50.60	+7.16
Liberal	James Trow	1,271	49.40	−7.16
Turnout		2,573	71.99	−8.17
Eligible voters		3,574		
Conservative gain from Liberal		Swing		+7.16
Source: Elections Ontario
