= Joe Hueglin =

Canadian politician (1937–2022)

Leader of the Progressive Canadian Party
- In office November 30, 2016 – November 30, 2019
- Preceded by: Sinclair Stevens
- Succeeded by: Position abolished

Member of the Canadian Parliament for Niagara Falls
- In office October 30, 1972 – July 8, 1974
- Preceded by: Joe Greene
- Succeeded by: Roger Young

Personal details
- Born: Joseph Fred Hueglin; February 7, 1937 Stratford, Ontario, Canada
- Died: July 5, 2022 (aged 85) Burlington, Ontario, Canada
- Party: Progressive Canadian (2003–2019)
- Other political affiliations: Progressive Conservative (1972–2003)
- Profession: Teacher

Joseph Fred Hueglin (February 7, 1937 – July 5, 2022) was a Canadian politician who was a member of Parliament and a founder of the Progressive Canadian Party.

Born in Stratford, Ontario, Hueglin was elected to Parliament in 1972 in the riding of Niagara Falls as a member of the Progressive Conservative Party of Canada (PC). In 1974 Hueglin was defeated by the Liberal candidate.

Within the Progressive Conservative Party, Hueglin was, along with David Orchard, among the most vocal opponents of the 2003 merger of Canada's two prominent right-wing parties, the Progressive Conservatives and the Canadian Alliance, into the Conservative Party of Canada. He expressed discomfort over the way the merger took place - which involved PC leader Peter MacKay breaking an anti-merger promise he had made while campaigning to be the party leader. Hueglin also expressed discomfort over the "neoconservative" aspects of Alliance policy, which he feared might dominate the policies of the new party.

In 2004, Hueglin became a lead organizer for the Progressive Canadian Party, which he described as a centrist party.
