= William H. Jarvis =

Canadian politician

The Honourable William H. Jarvis PC

Minister of State (Federal-Provincial Relations)
- In office June 4, 1979 – March 3, 1980
- Prime Minister: Joe Clark
- Preceded by: Position established
- Succeeded by: Lowell Murray (1986)

Member of Parliament for Perth (Perth—Wilmot; 1972–1976)
- In office October 30, 1972 – September 4, 1984
- Preceded by: Jay Monteith
- Succeeded by: Harry Brightwell

Personal details
- Born: William Herbert Jarvis; August 15, 1930 Hamilton, Ontario, Canada
- Died: April 26, 2016 (aged 85) Cornwall, Ontario, Canada
- Party: Progressive Conservative
- Education: University of Western Ontario
- Occupation: Lawyer
- Cabinet: Minister of State for Federal-Provincial Relations (1979-1980)

William Herbert Jarvis PC (August 15, 1930 – April 26, 2016) was a Canadian politician.

Born in Hamilton, Ontario, Jarvis attended the London Central Collegiate Institute and the University of Western Ontario where he was a member of Kappa Alpha Society.

A lawyer by profession, Jarvis was first elected to the House of Commons of Canada in the 1972 election as the Progressive Conservative Member of Parliament for Perth—Wilmot.

When the Tories came to power as a result of the 1979 election, Prime Minister Joe Clark appointed Jarvis to Cabinet as Minister of State for Federal-Provincial Relations.

Clark's minority government fell as a result of the budget's defeat in a motion of no confidence, and lost the subsequent 1980 election. Jarvis was re-elected in his riding. He retired from politics at the 1984 election.

Jarvis died in Cornwall, Ontario on April 26, 2016.
