= Fred Sanderson =

Canadian politician

Member of Parliament for Perth South
- In office October 1925 – October 1935
- Preceded by: William Forrester
- Succeeded by: riding dissolved

Member of Parliament for Perth
- In office October 1935 – April 1945
- Preceded by: riding created
- Succeeded by: Albert James Bradshaw

Personal details
- Born: Frederick George Sanderson; 12 October 1870 St. Marys, Ontario
- Died: 8 December 1954 (aged 84)
- Party: Liberal
- Spouse: Agnes Clark
- Profession: Agent, farmer, manufacturer

Frederick George Sanderson (12 October 1870 – 8 December 1954) was a Liberal party member of the House of Commons of Canada. He was born in St. Marys, Ontario and became an agent, farmer and manufacturer by career.

He attended St. Marys Collegiate Institute, then studied at the Ontario College of Pharmacy. His functions with the Liberal Party included a role as Ontario Liberal Whip in 1926, and in 1929 he became chief Ontario organizer for the federal party.

Sanderson was a municipal politician in St. Marys, Ontario, as a councillor from 1908 to 1910, then mayor in 1911 and 1912, and served on the Public Utility Commission from 1914 to 1916. He served as a captain of the Canadian army in World War I.

He was first elected to Parliament at the Perth South riding in the 1925 general election then re-elected in 1925, 1926 and 1930. In 1933, his riding became known as Perth and he was re-elected in 1935 and 1940. On 13 February 1936, he was appointed Deputy Speaker of the House of Commons. Sanderson finished his term in the 19th Canadian Parliament and did not seek a further term in the 1945 election.
