= Valentine Stock =

Canadian politician

Ontario MPP
- In office 1908–1911
- Preceded by: Samuel Nelson Monteith
- Succeeded by: John Bennewies
- In office 1902–1904
- Preceded by: Samuel Nelson Monteith
- Succeeded by: Samuel Nelson Monteith
- Constituency: Perth South

Personal details
- Born: June 30, 1852; East Zorra Township, Oxford County, Canada West
- Died: 1921 (aged 68–69)
- Political party: Liberal
- Spouse: Mary M. Marty (m. 1887)
- Occupation: Teacher, businessman

Valentine Stock (June 30, 1852 – 1921) was an Ontario merchant and political figure. He represented Perth South in the Legislative Assembly of Ontario from 1902 to 1904 and from 1908 to 1911 as a Liberal member.

He was born in East Zorra Township, Oxford County, Canada West, the son of Conrad (Johann Konrad) Stock, a German immigrant originally from Wallersdorf, Grebenau, Grand Duchy of Hesse. After suffering an injury working on the family farm, he earned a teacher's certificate and taught school in East Zorra and Tavistock. He set up his own business in Tavistock and later, with a partner, formed a company selling flax there. Stock married Mary M. Marty in 1887. In 1889, he was named clerk for South Easthope Township and served until 1919. He was an unsuccessful candidate in an 1899 provincial by-election in Perth South; he defeated Samuel Nelson Monteith in the general election held in 1902.
