= Perth (federal electoral district) =

Former federal electoral district in Ontario, Canada

Ontario electoral district

Defunct federal electoral district
- Legislature: House of Commons
- District created: 1933
- District abolished: 1987
- First contested: 1935
- Last contested: 1984

Perth (also known as Perth—Wilmot) was a federal electoral district in Ontario, Canada, that was represented in the House of Commons of Canada from 1935 to 1988. This riding was created in 1933 from Perth North and parts of Perth South ridings.

It initially consisted of the county of Perth, excluding the townships of Fullarton and Hibbert, but including the city of Stratford, the town of Mitchell, and the part of the village of Tavistock that lies in the county of Perth.

In 1947, Perth riding was redefined to consist of the county of Perth, excluding the townships of Fullarton, Logan, and Hibbert but including the city of Stratford and that part of the village of Tavistock contained in the township of Easthope South.

In 1952, it was redefined to consist of the county of Perth, excluding the township of Hibbert but including the city of Stratford and that part of the village of Tavistock contained in the township of Easthope South.

In 1966, it was redefined to consist of the County of Perth (excluding the Town of Palmerston and the Village of Tavistock), and that part of the County of Waterloo contained in the Township of Wilmot.

The name of the electoral district was changed in 1970 to Perth—Wilmot.

Perth—Wilmot was abolished in 1976 when it was redistributed between Oxford, Perth and Waterloo ridings.

The new riding of Perth consisted of County of Perth. Perth electoral district was abolished in 1987 when it was incorporated into Perth—Wellington—Waterloo riding.

== Members of Parliament ==
Parliament	Years	Member	Party
Perth
Riding created from Perth North and Perth South
18th	1935–1940	Fred Sanderson	Liberal
19th	1935–1940	Fred Sanderson	Liberal
20th	1945–1949	Albert Bradshaw	Progressive Conservative
21st	1949–1953	James Corry	Liberal
22nd	1953–1957	Jay Monteith	Progressive Conservative
23rd	1957–1958	Jay Monteith	Progressive Conservative
24th	1958–1962	Jay Monteith	Progressive Conservative
25th	1962–1963	Jay Monteith	Progressive Conservative
26th	1963–1965	Jay Monteith	Progressive Conservative
27th	1965–1968	Jay Monteith	Progressive Conservative
28th	1968–1972	Jay Monteith	Progressive Conservative
Perth—Wilmot
29th	1972–1974	William H. Jarvis	Progressive Conservative
30th	1974–1979	William H. Jarvis	Progressive Conservative
Riding dissolved into Perth, Oxford, and Waterloo
Perth
31st	1979–1980	William H. Jarvis	Progressive Conservative
32nd	1980–1984	William H. Jarvis	Progressive Conservative
33rd	1984–1988	Harry Brightwell	Progressive Conservative
Riding dissolved into Perth—Wellington—Waterloo

== Electoral history ==
=== Perth, 1933 - 1970 ===
1935 Canadian federal election
Party	Candidate	Votes
Liberal	Frederick George Sanderson	12,766
Progressive Conservative	Gerrance Hastings Jose	7,551
Reconstruction	Harry Watson	2,016
Co-operative Commonwealth	James Gerald Connor	1,211

1940 Canadian federal election
Party	Candidate	Votes
Liberal	Frederick George Sanderson	12,926
Conservative	John Murray	8,451

1945 Canadian federal election
Party	Candidate	Votes
Progressive Conservative	Albert James Bradshaw	10,961
Liberal	Theodore Parker	10,785
Co-operative Commonwealth	Norman Garfield McCully	1,772

1949 Canadian federal election
Party	Candidate	Votes
Liberal	James Neilson Corry	10,901
Progressive Conservative	Albert James Bradshaw	9,667
Co-operative Commonwealth	John Walter	1,697

1953 Canadian federal election
Party	Candidate	Votes
Progressive Conservative	Jay Monteith	12,959
Liberal	James Neilson Corry	10,939

1957 Canadian federal election
Party	Candidate	Votes
Progressive Conservative	Jay Monteith	16,663
Liberal	James C. Neilson	9,186

1958 Canadian federal election
Party	Candidate	Votes
Progressive Conservative	Jay Monteith	18,295
Liberal	James C. Neilson	6,842
Independent	Theodore R. Parker	859

1962 Canadian federal election
Party	Candidate	Votes
Progressive Conservative	Jay Monteith	15,108
Liberal	Fred Hotson	8,839

1963 Canadian federal election
Party	Candidate	Votes
Progressive Conservative	Jay Monteith	15,328
Liberal	R. Neill Bissonnette	10,442
New Democratic	Thomas O. Soper	1,065

1965 Canadian federal election
Party	Candidate	Votes
Progressive Conservative	Jay Monteith	13,558
Liberal	C. Isabel MacBeth	9,309
New Democratic	Gerald Alan Pout-MacDonald	1,712

1968 Canadian federal election
Party	Candidate	Votes
Progressive Conservative	Jay Monteith	14,959
Liberal	Bill Somerville	12,864
New Democratic	Jack Bishop	3,009

=== Perth—Wilmot, 1970 - 1976 ===
1972 Canadian federal election
Party	Candidate	Votes
Progressive Conservative	William H. Jarvis	19,859
Liberal	C. Cy Cline	11,684
New Democratic	Gary Gardiner	4,069

1974 Canadian federal election
Party	Candidate	Votes
Progressive Conservative	William H. Jarvis	17,636
Liberal	J. David Bradshaw	13,997
New Democratic	Joan E. Rankin	3,503

=== Perth, 1976 - 1987 ===
1979 Canadian federal election
Party	Candidate	Votes
Progressive Conservative	William H. Jarvis	19,019
Liberal	J. David Bradshaw	9,255
New Democratic	John Davies	4,255

1980 Canadian federal election
Party	Candidate	Votes
Progressive Conservative	William H. Jarvis	15,172
Liberal	Bob McTavish	12,077
New Democratic	John Davies	4,635
Marxist–Leninist	Salah Bachir	56

1984 Canadian federal election
Party	Candidate	Votes
Progressive Conservative	Harry Brightwell	19,186
Liberal	Brian Innes	10,155
New Democratic	Ian Munro	5,599

== See also ==
- List of Canadian electoral districts
- Historical federal electoral districts of Canada
