= James Corey =

James Corey may refer to:

- Jim Corey, American actor
- James S. A. Corey, pen name

== See also ==
- James Cory, Welsh politician and shipowner
- James Corry (disambiguation)
