= Charles Edward Richardson =

Canadian politician from Ontario

Member of the Ontario Provincial Parliament for Perth South
- In office October 29, 1930 – April 3, 1934
- Preceded by: David Bonis
- Succeeded by: constituency abolished

Personal details
- Party: Conservative

Charles Edward Richardson was a Canadian politician from the Conservative Party of Ontario. He represented Perth South in the Legislative Assembly of Ontario from 1930 to 1934.

== See also ==
- 18th Parliament of Ontario
