= McCausland Irvine =

Canadian politician from Ontario

Member of the Ontario Provincial Parliament for Perth South
- In office June 25, 1923 – October 18, 1926
- Preceded by: Peter Smith
- Succeeded by: Albert Alexander Colquhoun

Personal details
- Party: Conservative

McCausland Irvine was a Canadian politician from the Conservative Party of Ontario. He represented Perth South in the Legislative Assembly of Ontario from 1923 to 1926.

== See also ==
- 16th Parliament of Ontario
