= William Pridham =

Canadian politician

William Pridham (February 17, 1841 – March 29, 1919) was an English-born drover and political figure in Ontario, Canada. He represented Perth South in the House of Commons of Canada from 1892 to 1896 as a Conservative member.

He was first elected to the House of Commons in an 1892 by-election held after the election of James Trow in 1891 was overturned. Pridham was defeated by Dilman Kinsey Erb in bids for reelection in 1896 and 1900. Pridham lived in Fullarton.
