= Peter Smith (Canadian politician) =

Canadian politician

Ontario MPP
- In office 1919–1923
- Preceded by: John Bennewies
- Succeeded by: McCausland Irvine
- Constituency: Perth South

Personal details
- Born: May 26, 1877; Stratford, Ontario
- Died: May 21, 1934 (aged 56); Stratford, Ontario
- Political party: United Farmers

Peter Smith (May 26, 1877 – May 21, 1934) was a Canadian politician. He served as a Member of the Legislative Assembly of Ontario for Perth South from 1919 to 1923 representing the United Farmers of Ontario.

He served as provincial treasurer from 1919 to 1923. He was treasurer during the Ontario Bond Scandal.

Smith was tried for his role in the scandal following the fall of the UFO government. On October 24, 1924, he was found guilty of conspiracy to defraud the government and sentenced to three years. He and Aemilius Jarvis (sentenced to six months on the same conviction) were jointly fined $600,000. He died in 1934.

Political offices
Preceded by Thomas McGarry	Treasurer of Ontario; 1919–1923	Succeeded by William Herbert Price
