= Samuel Nelson Monteith =

Canadian politician

Samuel Monteith

Ontario MPP
- In office 1905–1908
- Preceded by: Valentine Stock
- Succeeded by: Valentine Stock
- In office 1899–1902
- Preceded by: William Caven Moscrip
- Succeeded by: Valentine Stock
- Constituency: Perth South

Personal details
- Born: November 21, 1862; Ireland
- Died: October 19, 1949 (aged 86); Iroquois Falls, Ontario
- Political party: Conservative
- Occupation: Farmer

Samuel Nelson Monteith (November 21, 1862 – October 19, 1949) was an Ontario farmer and political figure. He represented Perth South in the Legislative Assembly of Ontario from 1899 to 1902 and 1905 to 1908.

He was the son of Samuel Monteith, who came to Upper Canada from Ireland in 1830, and the nephew of Andrew Monteith. He served as reeve for Downie Township from 1894 to 1896 and was warden for Perth County in 1897. On his farm, a new tree was planted in its place whenever a tree was cut down. In 1898, he was initially declared elected over William Caven Moscrip, but Moscrip appealed and was declared elected. An appeal followed, and Monteith won the subsequent by-election, losing in 1902 to Valentine Stock. Monteith defeated Stock in the 1905 election and served as Minister of Agriculture from 1905 to 1908. During his term, a tree-planting program was established in the province. He was defeated by Stock in the 1908 election.

The municipality of Monteith in Cochrane District, now part of Iroquois Falls, was named in his honour; it was the site of an experimental farm.
