= William Caven Moscrip =

Canadian politician from Ontario

Member of the Ontario Provincial Parliament for Perth South
- In office 1 March 1898 – 23 March 1899
- Preceded by: John McNeill
- Succeeded by: Samuel Nelson Monteith

Personal details
- Born: 8 August 1852
- Died: 7 January 1911 (aged 58)
- Party: Liberal

William Caven Moscrip (8 August 1852 – 7 January 1911) was a Canadian politician from Ontario. He briefly represented Perth South in the Legislative Assembly of Ontario. In the 1898 Ontario general election, he was originally declared defeated by Conservative candidate Samuel Nelson Monteith but Moscrip appealed and was declared elected. A further appeal meant that a by-election was triggered in which Monteith was elected.

== See also ==
- 9th Parliament of Ontario
