= Albert Alexander Colquhoun =

Canadian politician from Ontario

Member of the Ontario Provincial Parliament for Perth South
- In office December 1, 1926 – September 17, 1929
- Preceded by: McCausland Irvine
- Succeeded by: David Bonis

Personal details
- Party: Liberal

Albert Alexander Colquhoun was a Canadian politician from the Liberal Party of Ontario. He represented Perth South in the Legislative Assembly of Ontario from 1926 to 1929.

== See also ==
- 17th Parliament of Ontario
