= Niagara Falls—Niagara-on-the-Lake =

Federal electoral district in Ontario, Canada

Coordinates: 43.06°N 79.1281°W

Ontario electoral district
- Interactive map of riding boundaries from the 2025 federal election

Federal electoral district
- Legislature: House of Commons
MP
Tony Baldinelli
Conservative
- District created: 1952
- First contested: 1953
- Last contested: 2025
- District webpage: profile, map

Demographics
- Population (2011): 128,357
- Electors (2015): 101,505
- Area (km²): 579
- Pop. density (per km²): 221.7
- Census division: Niagara
- Census subdivision(s): Niagara Falls, Niagara-on-the-Lake

Niagara Falls—Niagara-on-the-Lake (formerly Niagara Falls) is a federal electoral district in Ontario, Canada, that has been represented in the House of Commons of Canada since 1953.

It consists of the city of Niagara Falls and the towns of Niagara-on-the-Lake and Fort Erie.

Under the 2022 Canadian federal electoral redistribution the riding was renamed to its current name.

== History ==
The riding was created in 1952 from parts of Erie—Lincoln and Welland ridings. It consisted initially of the townships of Stamford, Willoughby and Bertie, the city of Niagara Falls, and the towns of Fort Erie, Chippawa and Crystal Beach in the county of Welland. In 1966, the towns of Fort Erie, Chippawa and Crystal Beach and the township of Stamford were excluded from the riding.

In 1976, the riding was redefined to consist of the City of Niagara Falls and the Town of Niagara-on-the-Lake. In 1996, the riding was expanded to include the part of the City of Thorold lying east of the Welland Canal. In 2004 the western boundary of the riding was moved east from the Welland Canal to the Thorold town line, while the southern boundary was extended south to Lake Erie. This change excluded the town of Thorold and included all of the town of Fort Erie.

This riding was left unchanged during the 2012 electoral redistribution.

== Demographics ==
According to the 2021 Canadian census

Ethnic groups: 79.2% White, 4.6% South Asian, 3.9% Indigenous, 2.6% Black, 2.2% Chinese, 2.3% Filipino, 1.6% Latin American
Languages: 77.7% English, 2.6% Italian, 1.6% French, 1.4% Spanish, 1.1% Tagalog, 1.1% German, 1.0% Mandarin
Religions: 60.9% Christian (30.6% Catholic, 5.8% Anglican, 4.0% United Church, 2.0% Presbyterian, 2.0% Christian Orthodox, 1.5% Lutheran, 1.1% Baptist, 1.0% Pentecostal, 1.0% Anabaptist, 11.9% Other), 2.9% Muslim, 1.5% Hindu, 32.2% None.
Median income: $36,800 (2020)
Average income: $47,720 (2020)

== Federal riding associations ==
Riding associations are the local branches of the national political parties:

Party	Association name	CEO	HQ city
Conservative Party of Canada	Niagara Falls—Niagara-on-the-Lake Conservative Association	Victor G. Ferraiuolo	Niagara Falls
Green Party of Canada	Niagara Falls—Niagara-on-the-Lake Green Party Association	Karen Lynn Fraser	Niagara Falls
Liberal Party of Canada	Niagara Falls—Niagara-on-the-Lake Federal Liberal Association	Cindy Lee I'Anson	Niagara-on-the-Lake
New Democratic Party	Niagara Falls Federal NDP Riding Association	Owen Riel	Niagara Falls

== Members of Parliament ==
This riding has elected the following members of Parliament:

Parliament	Years	Member	Party
Niagara Falls; Riding created from Lincoln and Welland
22nd	1953–1957	William Houck	Liberal
23rd	1957–1958	William Houck	Liberal
24th	1958–1960	William Houck	Liberal
24th	1960–1962	Judy LaMarsh	Liberal
25th	1962–1963	Judy LaMarsh	Liberal
26th	1963–1965	Judy LaMarsh	Liberal
27th	1965–1968	Judy LaMarsh	Liberal
28th	1968–1972	Joe Greene	Liberal
29th	1972–1974	Joe Hueglin	Progressive Conservative
30th	1974–1979	Roger Young	Liberal
31st	1979–1980	Jake Froese	Progressive Conservative
32nd	1980–1984	Al MacBain	Liberal
33rd	1984–1988	Rob Nicholson	Progressive Conservative
34th	1988–1993	Rob Nicholson	Progressive Conservative
35th	1993–1997	Gary Pillitteri	Liberal
36th	1997–2000	Gary Pillitteri	Liberal
37th	2000–2004	Gary Pillitteri	Liberal
38th	2004–2006	Rob Nicholson	Conservative
39th	2006–2008	Rob Nicholson	Conservative
40th	2008–2011	Rob Nicholson	Conservative
41st	2011–2015	Rob Nicholson	Conservative
42nd	2015–2019	Rob Nicholson	Conservative
43rd	2019–2021	Tony Baldinelli	Conservative
44th	2021–2025	Tony Baldinelli	Conservative
Niagara Falls—Niagara-on-the-Lake
45th	2025–present	Tony Baldinelli	Conservative

== Election results ==
View source data.
Graph of election results in Niagara Falls (parties that never received 2% of the vote are omitted)

2025 Canadian federal election
Party	Candidate	Votes	%	±%	Expenditures
Conservative	Tony Baldinelli	29,774	49.14	+11.72	$132,995.30
Liberal	Andrea Kaiser	27,194	44.88	+9.69	$131,857.54
New Democratic	Shannon Mitchell	2,335	3.85	–14.00	$6,303.58
Green	Celia Taylor	518	0.85	–1.10	$0.00
People's	Dinah Althorpe	481	0.79	–6.79	$240.15
Libertarian	Daniel Shakhmundes	160	0.26	N/A	none listed
Centrist	Yawar Anwar	128	0.21	N/A	$0.00
Total valid votes/expense limit		61,058	99.25	–	$136,596.39
Total rejected ballots		463	0.75		
Turnout		61,521	67.56		
Eligible voters		91,058			
Conservative notional hold		Swing		+1.02	
Source: Elections Canada

2021 federal election redistributed results
Party	Vote	%
Conservative	20,173	37.42
Liberal	18,972	35.19
New Democratic	9,625	17.85
People's	4,088	7.58
Green	1,050	1.95

2021 Canadian federal election: Niagara Falls
Party	Candidate	Votes	%	±%	Expenditures
Conservative	Tony Baldinelli	26,810	37.9	+2.4	$111,535.19
Liberal	Andrea Kaiser	23,650	33.5	+1.0	$114,330.02
New Democratic	Brian Barker	12,871	18.2	+0.2	$22,072.98
People's	Peter Taras	5,948	8.4	+7.0	$43,091.46
Green	Melanie Holm	1,370	1.9	-3.0	$1,799.97
Total valid votes		70,649	99.1		
Total rejected ballots		646	0.9		
Turnout		71,295	62.2		
Eligible voters		114,698			
Conservative hold		Swing		+0.7	
Source: Elections Canada

2019 Canadian federal election: Niagara Falls
Party	Candidate	Votes	%	±%	Expenditures
Conservative	Tony Baldinelli	24,751	35.49	-6.59	$99,463.10
Liberal	Andrea Kaiser	22,690	32.54	-1.95	$88,011.69
New Democratic	Brian Barker	12,566	18.02	-2.88	$17,190.50
Independent	Mike Strange	4,997	7.17	-	none listed
Green	Sandra O'Connor	3,404	4.88	+2.36	$7,271.20
People's	Alexander Taylor	968	1.39	-	none listed
Christian Heritage	Tricia O'Connor	358	0.51	-	none listed
Total valid votes/expense limit		69,734	99.10		
Total rejected ballots		636	0.90	+0.36	
Turnout		70,370	62.15	-0.84	
Eligible voters		113,232			
Conservative hold		Swing		-2.32	
Source: Elections Canada

2015 Canadian federal election
Party	Candidate	Votes	%	±%	Expenditures
Conservative	Rob Nicholson	27,235	42.09	-11.17	$154,867.12
Liberal	Ron Planche	22,318	34.49	+15.58	$63,639.74
New Democratic	Carolynn Ioannoni	13,525	20.90	-2.59	$31,267.04
Green	Steven Soos	1,633	2.52	-1.34	$3,055.92
Total valid votes/Expense limit		64,711	99.46		$251,076.96
Total rejected ballots		353	0.54		
Turnout		65,064	62.99		
Eligible voters		103,291			
Conservative hold		Swing		-13.38	
Source: Elections Canada

2011 Canadian federal election
Party	Candidate	Votes	%	±%	Expenditures
Conservative	Rob Nicholson	28,748	53.26	+6.56	–
New Democratic	Heather Kelley	12,681	23.49	+5.63	–
Liberal	Bev Hodgson	10,206	18.91	-8.00	–
Green	Shawn Willick	2,086	3.86	-4.61	–
Christian Heritage	Harold Jonker	259	0.5%	+0.48	–
Total valid votes		53,980	100.00	–	
Total rejected ballots		264	0.49	-0.01	
Turnout		54,244	56.90	+2.30	
Eligible voters		95,326	–	–	

2008 Canadian federal election
Party	Candidate	Votes	%	±%	Expenditures
Conservative	Rob Nicholson	24,016	46.70%	+6.3%	$77,050
Liberal	Joyce Morocco	13,867	26.96%	-7.5%	$89,565
New Democratic	Eric Gillespie	9,186	17.86%	-3.1%	$18,513
Green	Shawn Willick	4,356	8.47%	+4.4%	$7,974
Total valid votes/Expense limit		51,425	99.5%	$94,533	
Total rejected ballots		264	0.5%		
Turnout		51,689	54.60%		

2006 Canadian federal election
Party	Candidate	Votes	%	±%
Conservative	Rob Nicholson	23,489	40.4%	+1.7%
Liberal	Gary Burroughs	20,099	34.5%	-2.0%
New Democratic	Wayne Gates	12,214	21.0%	+0.2%
Green	Kay Green	2,402	4.1%	+0.1%
Total valid votes		58,204	100.0%	

2004 Canadian federal election
Party	Candidate	Votes	%	±%
Conservative	Rob Nicholson	19,882	38.7%	-7.7%
Liberal	Victor Pietrangelo	18,745	36.5%	-9.4%
New Democratic	Wayne Gates	10,680	20.8%	+14.7%
Green	Ted Mousseau	2,071	4.0%	+2.7%
Total valid votes		51,378	100.0%	

Note: Conservative vote is compared to the total of the Canadian Alliance vote and Progressive Conservative vote in 2000 election.

2000 Canadian federal election
Party	Candidate	Votes	%	±%
Liberal	Gary Pillitteri	17,907	45.9%	+7.6%
Alliance	Mel Grunstein	11,999	30.8%	+4.2%
Progressive Conservative	Tony Baldinelli	6,077	15.6%	-8.4%
New Democratic	Ed Booker	2,356	6.0%	-3.8%
Green	Clara Tarnoy	501	1.3%	+0.4%
Natural Law	Bill Amos	155	0.4%	0.0%
Total valid votes		38,995	100.0%	

Note: Canadian Alliance vote is compared to the Reform vote in 1997 election.

1997 Canadian federal election
Party	Candidate	Votes	%	±%
Liberal	Gary Pillitteri	15,868	38.4%	-8.7%
Reform	Mel Grunstein	10,986	26.6%	+1.6%
Progressive Conservative	Rob Nicholson	9,935	24.0%	+1.7%
New Democratic	John Cowan	4,052	9.8%	+6.4%
Green	Alexander Rados	374	0.9%	+0.3%
Natural Law	Bill Amos	154	0.4%	0.0%
Total valid votes		41,369	100.0%	

1993 Canadian federal election
Party	Candidate	Votes	%	±%
Liberal	Gary Pillitteri	20,542	47.1%	+12.1%
Reform	Mel Grunstein	10,890	25.0%	
Progressive Conservative	Rob Nicholson	9,719	22.3%	-17.2%
New Democratic	Steve Leonard	1,470	3.4%	-18.0%
National	John Cowan	513	1.2%	
Green	John Bruce McBurney	258	0.6%	
Natural Law	Bill Amos	166	0.4%	
Abolitionist	Ted Wiwchar	82	0.2%	
Total valid votes		43,640	100.0%	

1988 Canadian federal election
Party	Candidate	Votes	%	±%
Progressive Conservative	Rob Nicholson	17,077	39.5%	-15.6%
Liberal	Gary Pillitteri	15,137	35.0%	+15.2%
New Democratic	Dick Harrington	9,232	21.3%	-2.4%
Christian Heritage	Bill Andres	1,713	4.0%	
Commonwealth of Canada	Jean-Claude Souvray	97	0.2%	
Total valid votes		43,256	100.0%	

1984 Canadian federal election
Party	Candidate	Votes	%	±%
Progressive Conservative	Rob Nicholson	22,852	55.1%	+18.2%
New Democratic	Richard Harrington	9,863	23.8%	+2.6%
Liberal	Al MacBain	8,219	19.8%	-21.3%
Green	Robert G. Scott	352	0.8%	
Social Credit	Earl G. Erb	177	0.4%	-0.1%
Total valid votes		41,463	100.0%	

1980 Canadian federal election
Party	Candidate	Votes	%	±%
Liberal	Al MacBain	15,871	41.1%	+2.6%
Progressive Conservative	Jake Froese	14,251	36.9%	-5.0%
New Democratic	John A. Dawson	8,167	21.2%	+2.0%
Social Credit	Bruce Arnold	221	0.6%	
Marxist–Leninist	David Wiwcharyk	61	0.2%	-0.2%
Total valid votes		38,571	100.0%	

1979 Canadian federal election
Party	Candidate	Votes	%	±%
Progressive Conservative	Jake Froese	16,916	41.9%	+10.3%
Liberal	Roger Carl Young	15,545	38.5%	-14.7%
New Democratic	John Dawson	7,757	19.2%	+4.7%
Marxist–Leninist	David Wiwcharyk	135	0.3%	
Total valid votes		40,353	100.0%	

1974 Canadian federal election
Party	Candidate	Votes	%	±%
Liberal	Roger Young	20,618	53.3%	14.5%
Progressive Conservative	Joe Hueglin	12,225	31.6%	-9.0%
New Democratic	Pat Piccirillo	5,607	14.5%	-5.4%
Social Credit	George Olesevich	254	0.7%	0.0%
Total valid votes		38,704	100.0%	

1972 Canadian federal election
Party	Candidate	Votes	%	±%
Progressive Conservative	Joe Hueglin	15,701	40.6%	+8.7%
Liberal	Tom Jamieson	14,978	38.7%	-12.0%
New Democratic	Ray Wilson	7,705	19.9%	+2.6%
Social Credit	George Olesevich	270	0.7%	
Total valid votes		38,654	100.0%	

1968 Canadian federal election
Party	Candidate	Votes	%	±%
Liberal	John James Greene	17,183	50.7%	-9.4%
Progressive Conservative	Bob Rolls	10,825	32.0%	+6.8%
New Democratic	Ray Wilson	5,861	17.3%	+6.0%
Total valid votes		33,869	100.0%	

1965 Canadian federal election
Party	Candidate	Votes	%	±%
Liberal	Judy LaMarsh	17,794	60.1%	+0.0%
Progressive Conservative	Jean Douglas	7,442	25.1%	-3.3%
New Democratic	Ronald C. Seebach	3,361	11.4%	-0.1%
Independent PC	John G. Graaskamp	657	2.2%	
Social Credit	Arthur David Brooker	346	1.2%	
Total valid votes		29,600	100.0%	

1963 Canadian federal election
Party	Candidate	Votes	%	±%
Liberal	Judy LaMarsh	18,749	60.2%	+0.5%
Progressive Conservative	Jean Douglas	8,863	28.4%	+3.3%
New Democratic	Bill Johnson	3,555	11.4%	-0.6%
Total valid votes		31,167	100.0%	

1962 Canadian federal election
Party	Candidate	Votes	%	±%
Liberal	Judy LaMarsh	18,500	59.7%	+12.3%
Progressive Conservative	Jean Douglas	7,795	25.2%	-4.1%
New Democratic	Bill Johnson	3,713	12.0%	-11.4%
Social Credit	Vito Antonio	985	3.2%	
Total valid votes		30,993	100.0%	

Canadian federal by-election, 31 October 1960 On Mr. Houck's death (5 May 1960)
Party	Candidate	Votes	%	±%
Liberal	Judy LaMarsh	13,428	47.3%	+1.6%
Progressive Conservative	Keith Lougheed	8,309	29.3%	-14.8%
New Democratic	Edward E. Mitchelson (as New Party)	6,627	23.4%	+13.2%
Total valid votes		28,364	100.0%	

Note: NDP vote is compared to CCF vote in 1958 election.

1958 Canadian federal election
Party	Candidate	Votes	%	±%
Liberal	William Houck	14,025	45.8%	-8.2%
Progressive Conservative	Robert H. Hamilton	13,504	44.1%	-2.0%
Co-operative Commonwealth	Edward F. Twocock	3,115	10.2%	
Total valid votes		30,644	100.0%	

1957 Canadian federal election
Party	Candidate	Votes	%	±%
Liberal	William Houck	12,706	54.0%	-5.8%
Progressive Conservative	Robert H. Hamilton	10,845	46.0%	+18.1%
Total valid votes		23,551	100.0%	

1953 Canadian federal election
Party	Candidate	Votes	%
Liberal	William Houck	13,400	59.7%
Progressive Conservative	Winnifred Margaret Stokes	6,264	27.9%
Co-operative Commonwealth	Joseph Bacon	2,605	11.6%
Independent	Henry Speakman	167	0.7%
Total valid votes		22,436	100.0%

== See also ==
- List of Canadian electoral districts
- Historical federal electoral districts of Canada
