= John McNeill (Ontario politician) =

Canadian politician (1848–1924)

Ontario MPP
- In office 1894–1898
- Preceded by: Thomas Ballantyne
- Succeeded by: William Caven Moscrip
- Constituency: Perth South

Personal details
- Born: 1 March 1848 near Glasgow, Scotland
- Died: 12 November 1924 (aged 76); Fullarton, Ontario
- Political party: Liberal-Patrons of Industry
- Occupation: Farmer

John McNeill (1 March 1848 – 12 November 1924) was an Ontario farmer and political figure. He represented Perth South in the Legislative Assembly of Ontario from 1894 to 1898 as a Liberal-Patrons of Industry member.

He was born near Glasgow, Scotland. McNeill served on the council for Fullarton Township. He died there in 1924.
