= Joe Greene (Ontario politician) =

Canadian politician

The Honourable Joe Greene PC QC DFC
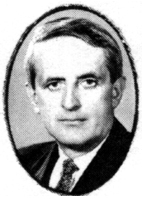

Minister of Energy, Mines and Resources
- In office 6 July 1968 – 27 January 1972
- Prime Minister: Pierre Trudeau
- Preceded by: Jean-Luc Pépin
- Succeeded by: Donald Stovel Macdonald

Minister of Agriculture
- In office 18 December 1965 – 5 July 1968
- Prime Minister: Lester B. Pearson; Pierre Trudeau
- Preceded by: Harry Hays
- Succeeded by: Bud Olson

Canadian Senator from Ontario
- In office 1 September 1972 – 23 October 1978
- Appointed by: Pierre Trudeau

Member of Parliament for Niagara Falls
- In office 25 June 1968 – 31 August 1972
- Preceded by: Judy LaMarsh
- Succeeded by: Joe Hueglin

Member of Parliament for Renfrew South
- In office 8 April 1963 – 24 June 1968
- Preceded by: James William Baskin
- Succeeded by: Riding dissolved

Personal details
- Born: John James Greene; 24 June 1920 Toronto, Ontario, Canada
- Died: 23 October 1978 (aged 58) Ottawa, Ontario, Canada
- Party: Liberal
- Spouse: Corinne Bedore (m. 1948)
- Children: 5
- Profession: Lawyer

Military service
- Allegiance: Canada
- Branch/service: Royal Canadian Air Force
- Years of service: 1941–1945
- Rank: Flight lieutenant
- Awards: Distinguished Flying Cross; Mentioned in dispatches

John James "Joe" Greene PC QC DFC (24 June 1920 – 23 October 1978) was a Canadian politician.

== Life and career ==
Greene was born in Toronto, Ontario, the son of Andrée (née Charpagnol) and Peter Greene. He grew up in Toronto before finding work in northern Ontario as a mine worker.

After graduating from the University of Toronto Schools, he served in the Royal Canadian Air Force during World War II and earned the Distinguished Flying Cross. Following the war, he earned a Bachelor of Arts from the University of Toronto and a law degree from Osgoode Hall. He began practice in Toronto, establishing a law firm in Arnprior, Ontario in 1949. In 1948, he married Corinne Bedore.

He ran for the leadership of the Ontario Liberal Party in 1958, placing a poor third at the party's leadership convention.

He was first elected to the House of Commons of Canada as a Liberal in the 1963 general election. In 1964, he ran again for the leadership of the Ontario Liberals, placing fourth.

In 1965, he became Minister of Agriculture in the cabinet of Lester Pearson, one of the few non-farmers to hold the position and the first easterner in 54 years. In 1968, he ran to succeed Pearson in that year's federal Liberal leadership convention, but despite giving what many say was the best speech, he came in fifth place. After three ballots, he threw his support to Pierre Trudeau, contributing towards his victory. The new Prime Minister made Greene Minister of Energy, Mines and Resources.

Greene moved to the riding of Niagara Falls, Ontario in the 1968 election, and was again elected to Parliament. As energy minister, Greene prevented the sale of both the largest oil company under Canadian control and Canada's largest uranium producer to Americans.

Greene suffered a heart attack in 1969, and was required to take a temporary leave of absence from parliament. Otto Lang served as the acting minister of Energy, Mines and Resources in this period. Green later suffered a stroke in late 1971. Greene retired from cabinet in January 1972 when he was appointed to the Senate of Canada.

He died in 1978, aged 58.

Parliament of Canada
Preceded by James William Baskin	Member of Parliament from Renfrew South; 1963–1968	Succeeded by The electoral district was abolished in 1966.
Preceded by Judy LaMarsh	Member of Parliament from Niagara Falls; 1968–1972	Succeeded by Joe Hueglin
Political offices
Preceded by Harry Hays	Minister of Agriculture; 1965–1968	Succeeded by Bud Olson
Preceded by Jean-Luc Pepin	Minister of Energy, Mines and Resources; 1968–1972	Succeeded by Donald Stovel Macdonald
