= Judy LaMarsh =

Canadian broadcaster, writer, lawyer and politician (1924–1980)

The Honourable Judy LaMarsh PC OC QC
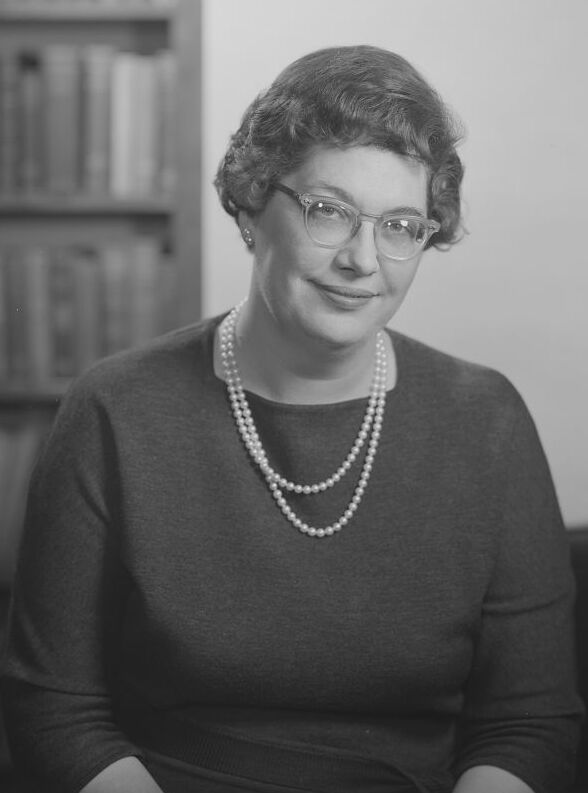
- LaMarsh, c. 1964

Secretary of State for Canada
- In office December 18, 1965 – April 9, 1968
- Prime Minister: Lester B. Pearson
- Preceded by: Maurice Lamontagne
- Succeeded by: John Joseph Connolly (Acting)

Minister of National Health and Welfare
- In office April 22, 1963 – December 17, 1965
- Prime Minister: Lester B. Pearson
- Preceded by: Jay Monteith
- Succeeded by: Allan MacEachen

Minister of Amateur Sport
- In office April 22, 1963 – December 17, 1965
- Prime Minister: Lester B. Pearson
- Preceded by: Jay Monteith
- Succeeded by: Allan MacEachen

Member of Parliament for Niagara Falls
- In office October 31, 1960 – June 24, 1968
- Preceded by: William Houck
- Succeeded by: Joe Greene

Personal details
- Born: Julia Verlyn LaMarsh; December 20, 1924 Chatham, Ontario, Canada
- Died: October 27, 1980 (aged 55) Toronto, Ontario, Canada
- Resting place: Niagara Falls, Ontario, Canada
- Party: Liberal
- Education: University of Toronto; Osgoode Hall Law School
- Occupation: Barrister; broadcaster; politician; writer

Military service
- Allegiance: Canada
- Branch/service: Canadian Women's Army Corps
- Years of service: 1943–1945
- Rank: Intelligence officer

Julia Verlyn LaMarsh PC OC QC (December 20, 1924 – October 27, 1980) was a Canadian politician, lawyer, author and broadcaster. In 1963, she became the second woman to serve as a federal Cabinet minister. Under Prime Minister Lester Pearson's minority governments of the middle and late 1960s, she helped push through the legislation that created the Canada Pension Plan and Medicare. As Secretary of State, she was in charge of Canada's Centennial celebrations in 1967. After leaving politics in 1968, she wrote three books, and had her own radio show on CBC Radio. She was stricken with pancreatic cancer in 1979 and was given the Order of Canada at her hospital bed. She died a few days short of the 20th anniversary of her first political election victory, in 1980.

== Early life ==
LaMarsh was born December 20, 1924, in Chatham, Ontario. Of French and English descent, she was raised in Niagara Falls. Although she trained as a teacher, she never taught school. In high school, she was a member of Alpha Chapter, Theta Kappa Sigma Sorority in Niagara Falls. During World War II, she enlisted in the Canadian Women's Army Corps, travelled the country from 1943 to 1946, and attained the rank of sergeant. LaMarsh worked with the Corps of Royal Canadian Engineers in Halifax and then, after studying Japanese in Vancouver, served as a Japanese translator in Intelligence with Japanese-Canadian soldiers.

After the war, she attended the University of Toronto's Victoria College and Osgoode Hall, where she was trained as a lawyer, graduating in 1950. She was called to the Bar of Ontario, and joined her father's law practice in Niagara Falls.

== Political career ==
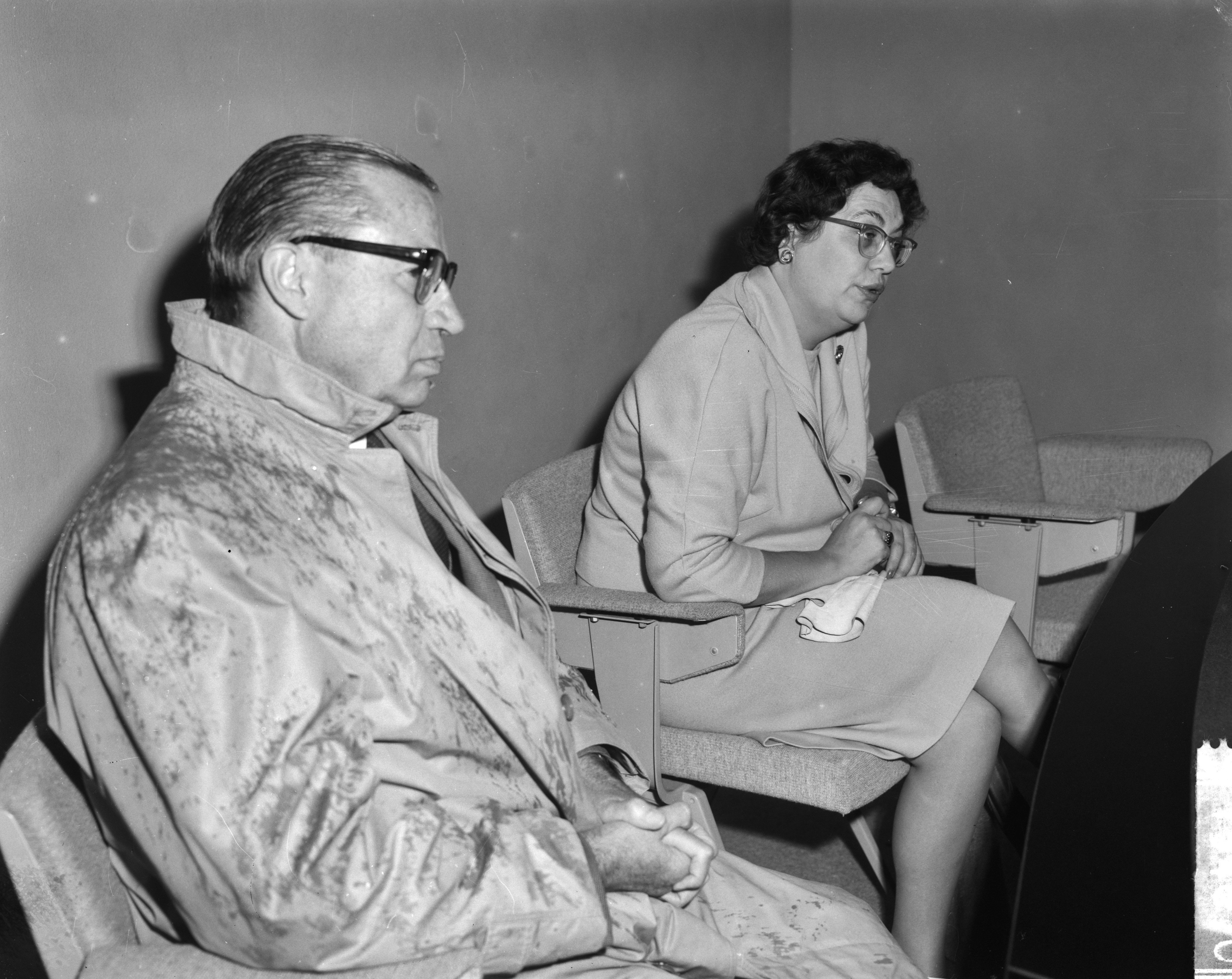
LaMarsh and Ambassador William Frederick Bull in 1963

After unsuccessful forays into Ontario provincial politics, LaMarsh was first elected to the House of Commons of Canada in a 1960 by-election. Sitting as a Liberal Member of Parliament (MP) for Niagara Falls, she joined the Canadian Cabinet after the Liberals defeated the Progressive Conservative government of John Diefenbaker in the 1963 election. Serving under Prime Minister Lester Pearson, she was the second female federal cabinet minister in Canadian history, and the first to serve in a Liberal cabinet. LaMarsh served as Minister of National Health and Welfare and Minister of Amateur Sport from 1963 to 1965, and as Secretary of State for Canada from 1965 to 1968.

Her period as Minister of National Health and Welfare coincided with the introduction of the Canada Pension Plan and the drafting of what was to become Canada's Medicare system. Besides shepherding the Medicare bill through parliament, she also became the first major western-world government official to oppose tobacco smoking publicly. On June 17, 1963, she rose to speak on the floor of the House of Commons and declared: "There is scientific evidence that cigarette smoking is a contributory cause of lung cancer and that it may also be associated with chronic bronchitis and coronary heart disease." As Secretary of State, she presided over the Canadian Centennial celebrations in 1967, presented the Broadcasting Act of 1968 to Parliament, and served on the Royal Commission on the Status of Women.

In the 1968 Liberal leadership convention to choose a successor to Pearson, she supported Paul Hellyer. When it became clear after the first round of voting that Hellyer could not win, she urged him to drop off the ballot and throw his support to another candidate in order to stop Pierre Trudeau. Her words, uttered on the floor of the convention hall: "Paul, you've got to go to [Robert] Winters. Don't let that bastard win it, Paul – he isn't even a Liberal" were, unbeknownst to her, broadcast live over CBC Television. She retired from politics after Trudeau won the party's leadership.

== Post-political career ==
After politics, she returned to her work as a lawyer. She often took on civil rights cases, including the defense of the Brunswick Four in a prominent LGBT rights case in 1974.

She published her political autobiography, entitled Memoirs of a Bird in a Gilded Cage, in 1969, and the book sold very well. LaMarsh worked as a broadcaster including a part-time job with CBC Radio, hosting This Country in the Morning in 1974. From fall 1975 to spring 1976, she hosted her own show called Judy. It was broadcast weekdays from 9:00 a.m. to noon, nationally.

In April 1975, Ontario Premier William Davis chose her to head the Ontario government's Royal Commission on Violence in the Communications Industry. It spent two years coming up with 68 recommendations, many highly controversial ones like an omnibus government agency controlling all television content, and newspapers to be governed by a national council on ethics, that would police the industry for violations. Civil liberty groups criticized the media recommendations as violations on free speech and freedom of the press grounds.

== Later life and death ==
In 1979, she decided to go back into law, and opened a family law practice. In December 1979, LaMarsh was rushed to Sunnybrook Medical Centre where she was diagnosed with inoperable pancreatic cancer. While receiving treatment for her cancer at Toronto's Princess Margaret Hospital, Governor General Edward Schreyer invested her as an Officer of the Order of Canada, at her hospital bed on July 22, 1980. A few months later, just days away from the 20th anniversary of her first federal political victory, she died on October 27, 1980, aged 55.

Her funeral was held in Niagara Falls on October 29, 1980. She had six female pallbearers including: Edith Druggan and Florence Rosberg, of Niagara Falls, broadcaster Barbara Frum, British Columbia Judge Nancy Morrison, lawyer Pamela Verill Walker, and Doris Anderson, president of the Canadian Advisory Council on the Status of Women. It was a short service, attended by 300 friends and dignitaries including Ontario's premier William Davis, former Ontario Lieutenant-Governor Pauline McGibbon, and several federal politicians including the man she backed for federal Liberal leader in 1968, Paul Hellyer. She was laid to rest next to her parents, at a graveyard that bordered the historic Canadian battleground, Lundy's Lane.

== Legacy ==
On September 10, 2026, the Canadian Coast Guard light icebreaker named CCGS Judy LaMarsh was christened at the Canadian Coast Guard base in Prescott, Ontario. This was the first additional large vessel to join the Great Lakes region in over 30 years.

Based in Prescott, the vessel will carry out icebreaking and buoy tending operations across the Great Lakes and the St. Lawrence River in Ontario and Quebec.

== Books ==
- LaMarsh, Judy (1969). Memoirs of a Bird in a Gilded Cage. Toronto: McClelland and Stewart.
- LaMarsh, Judy (1979). A Very Political Lady: A Novel. Toronto: McClelland and Stewart. ISBN 0-7710-4622-7.
- LaMarsh, Judy (1980). A Right Honourable Lady: A Novel. Toronto: McClelland and Stewart. ISBN 0-7710-4624-3.

== Archives ==
There is a Judy LaMarsh fonds at Library and Archives Canada.

19th Canadian Ministry (1963–1968) – Cabinet of Lester B. Pearson
Cabinet posts (2)
Predecessor	Office	Successor
Maurice Lamontagne	Secretary of State for Canada; 1965–1968	John Joseph Connolly
Jay Monteith	Minister of National Health and Welfare; 1963–1965	Allan Joseph MacEachen
