= Dilman Kinsey Erb =

Canadian politician

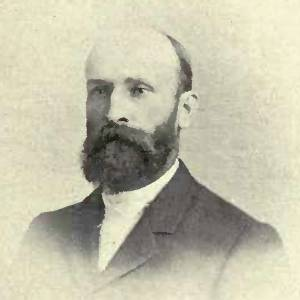

Member of the Canadian Parliament for Perth South
- In office 1896–1904
- Preceded by: William Pridham
- Succeeded by: Gilbert Howard McIntyre

Personal details
- Born: July 16, 1857 Woolwich Township, Waterloo County, Canada West
- Died: February 19, 1936 (aged 78) Downie Township, Perth County, Ontario
- Party: Liberal
- Spouse: Phoebe Huber (m. 1881)
- Relations: Abraham Erb
- Occupation: Educator, farmer

Dilman Kinsey Erb (July 16, 1857 – February 19, 1936) was an educator, farmer, and politician in Ontario, Canada. He represented Perth South in the House of Commons of Canada from 1896 to 1904 as a Liberal member.

He was born in Woolwich Township, Canada West, the son of Isaac Erb and Hannah Kinsey. His family was of Swiss descent and came to Waterloo County by way of Pennsylvania. Erb was educated in Bridgeport, Ontario, taught school for several years and was principal of the New Dundee public school. In 1881, he married Phoebe Huber. Four years later, he moved to Downie Township, where he became a farmer. Erb was a member of the school board and township council for Downie Township, also serving as deputy reeve. Around 1892, he was named a justice of the peace. Erb served four years as president of the Sebringville Flax Company. He died in Downie Township at the age of 78.

He was a distant relative of Abraham Erb, an early settler of Waterloo Township and the founder of Waterloo, Ontario.
