= Gary Pillitteri =

Canadian politician

Member of Parliament for Niagara Falls
- In office 25 October 1993 – 28 June 2004
- Preceded by: Rob Nicholson
- Succeeded by: Rob Nicholson

Personal details
- Born: 1 March 1936 (age 90) Racalmuto, Italy
- Party: Liberal
- Occupation: businessman

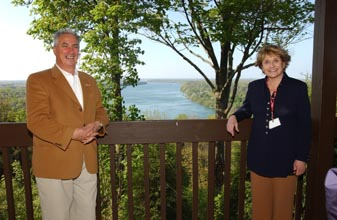
Pillitteri with Louise Slaughter in May 2003

Gary Orazio Vincenzo Pillitteri (born 1 March 1936) is a Canadian politician who was a member of the House of Commons of Canada from 1993 to 2004. Born in Racalmuto, Italy, Pillitteri is a farmer and businessman. He is the founder and president of Pillitteri Estates Winery in Niagara-on-the-Lake.

Pillitteri is a member of the Liberal Party who first bid for the Niagara Falls electoral district in 1988. He lost to Conservative candidate Rob Nicholson in that election by a narrow margin of only 1,940 votes. After a second attempt in the 1993 general election, he defeated Nicholson by 10,823 votes and joined the federal Parliament and was re-elected in 1997 and 2000. He therefore served in the 35th, 36th and 37th Canadian Parliaments.

Pillitteri left federal politics in 2004 and did not seek a fourth term in federal office. Rob Nicholson decided to put his name forward to run as the Conservative candidate in the next election only once he learned that Pillitteri had retired. Nicholson regained the riding that year.

== Electoral record ==
2000 Canadian federal election: Niagara Falls
| Party | Candidate | Votes | % | ±% | Expenditures |
|---|---|---|---|---|---|
| Liberal | Gary Pillitteri | 17,907 | 45.92 | – | $60,782.72 |
| Alliance | Mel Grunstein | 11,999 | 30.77 | | $48,894.94 |
| Progressive Conservative | Tony Baldinelli | 6,077 | 15.58 | | $25,279.11 |
| New Democratic | Ed Booker | 2,356 | 6.04 | | $5,369.41 |
| Green | Clara Tarnoy | 501 | 1.28 | | $617.59 |
| Natural Law | Bill Amos | 155 | 0.40 | | $0.00 |
| Total valid votes | | 38,995 | 100.00 | | |
| Total rejected ballots | | 320 | | | |
| Turnout | | 39,315 | 57.10 | | |
| Electors on the lists | | 68,854 | | | |
Sources: Official Results, Elections Canada and Financial Returns, Elections Canada.

1997 Canadian federal election: Niagara Falls
| Party | Candidate | Votes | % | ±% | Expenditures |
|---|---|---|---|---|---|
| Liberal | Gary Pillitteri | 15,868 | 38.36 | – | $40,762 |
| Reform | Mel Grunstein | 10,986 | 26.56 | | $34,441 |
| Progressive Conservative | Rob Nicholson | 9,935 | 24.02 | | $42,567 |
| New Democratic | John Cowan | 4,052 | 9.79 | | $14,092 |
| Green | Alexander Rados | 374 | 0.90 | | $322 |
| Natural Law | Bill Amos | 154 | 0.37 | | $0.00 |
| Total valid votes | | 41,369 | 100.00 | | |
| Total rejected ballots | | 355 | | | |
| Turnout | | 41,724 | 64.54 | | |
| Electors on the lists | | 65,649 | | | |
Sources: Official Results, Elections Canada and Financial Returns, Elections Canada.

1993 Canadian federal election: Niagara Falls
| Party | Candidate | Votes | % | ±% | Expenditures |
|---|---|---|---|---|---|
| Liberal | Gary Pillitteri | 20,567 | 47.10 | – | $47,498 |
| Reform | Mel Grunstein | 10,895 | 24.95 | | $26,500 |
| Progressive Conservative | Rob Nicholson | 9,707 | 22.23 | | $54,883 |
| New Democratic Party | Steve Leonard | 1,470 | 3.37 | | $6,819 |
| National | John Cowan | 511 | 1.17 | | $1,373 |
| Green | John Bruce McBurney | 263 | 0.60 | | $483 |
| Natural Law | Bill Amos | 169 | 0.39 | | $0 |
| Abolitionist | Ted Wiwchar | 82 | 0.19 | | $0 |
| Total valid votes | | 43,664 | 100.00 | | |
| Total rejected ballots | | 484 | | | |
| Turnout | | 44,148 | 66.85 | | |
| Electors on the lists | | 66,044 | | | |
Source: Thirty-fifth General Election, 1993: Official Voting Results, Published by the Chief Electoral Officer of Canada. Financial figures taken from official contributions and expenses provided by Elections Canada.
