= Avonbank, Ontario =

Avonbank
- Interactive map of Avonbank
- Coordinates: 43°19′44″N 81°07′45″W
- Country: Canada
- Province: Ontario
- Region: Southwestern Ontario
- County: Perth
- Elevation: 328 m (1,076 ft)
- Time zone: UTC-5 (Eastern Time Zone)
  - Summer (DST): UTC-4 (Eastern Time Zone)
- Area codes: 519, 226

Avonbank is a community on the Avon River in the township of Perth South, Perth County in Southwestern Ontario Ontario, Canada. It lies on 16th Line west of Perth Road 130, about 12 kilometres (7 mi) southwest of Stratford and 8 kilometres (5 mi) north of St. Marys.

Michael Steele, a physician and member of the House of Commons of Canada, was born in Avonbank.
