= Thomas B. Guest =

Canadian politician

Thomas Guest
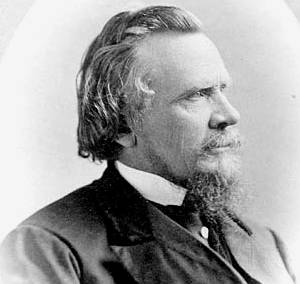
- 180px

Ontario MPP
- In office 1871–1874
- Preceded by: James Trow
- Succeeded by: John McNeill
- Constituency: Perth South

Personal details
- Born: October 27, 1816 Ireland
- Died: February 23, 1884 (aged 67) St. Mary's, Ontario
- Party: Conservative
- Occupation: Farmer

Thomas Boy Guest (1816-1884) was an Ontario political figure. He represented Perth South in the Legislative Assembly of Ontario from 1871 to 1874. He was born in Ireland in 1816.

He served as reeve of St. Mary's in 1855 to 1856, warden for Perth County in 1856 and mayor of St. Mary's in 1864. He was also lieutenant-colonel of the local militia. He died at St. Mary's in 1884 and was buried at the St. Mary's Protestant Cemetery.

== Electoral history ==
1871 Ontario general election: Perth South
| Party | Candidate | Votes | % | ±% |
|---|---|---|---|---|
| Conservative | Thomas B. Guest | 1,302 | 50.60 | +7.16 |
| Liberal | James Trow | 1,271 | 49.40 | −7.16 |
| Turnout | | 2,573 | 71.99 | −8.17 |
| Eligible voters | | 3,574 | | |
| Conservative gain from Liberal | | Swing | | +7.16 |
Source: Elections Ontario
