= Michael Steele (Canadian politician) =

Canadian politician (1861–1946)

Member of Parliament for Perth South
- In office 1911–1921
- Preceded by: Gilbert Howard McIntyre
- Succeeded by: William Forrester

Personal details
- Born: 24 July 1861 Avonbank, Canada West
- Died: 1 January 1946 (aged 84) Vienna, Ontario, Canada
- Party: Conservative

Michael Steele (July 24, 1861 – January 1, 1946) was a physician and political figure in Ontario, Canada. He represented Perth South in the House of Commons of Canada from 1911 to 1921 as a Conservative.

He was born in Avonbank, Canada West, the son of Thomas Steele and Joanna Todd, and was educated in St. Mary's, at the Toronto Normal School and at Trinity Medical College. He practised medicine in Tavistock. Steele was married twice: to Annie Clark in 1889 and then to Annie R. McGregor. Steele ran unsuccessfully for a seat in the House of Commons in 1904 and 1908. From 1917 to 1921, he was a member of the Unionist Party. He was defeated when he ran for reelection in 1921. He died in Vienna, Ontario at the age of 84.
