= James Corry (Canadian politician) =

Canadian politician

Member of Parliament for Perth
- In office June 1949 – August 1953

Personal details
- Born: James Neilson Corry; 15 February 1895 Britton, Ontario, Canada
- Died: 11 July 1968 (aged 73)
- Party: Liberal
- Spouse(s): Claribel Webster m. 10 September 1924
- Profession: farmer

James Neilson Corry (15 February 1895 – 11 July 1968) was a Liberal party member of the House of Commons of Canada. He was born in Britton, Ontario and became a farmer by occupation.

Corry served in the military during World War I with the 10th Canadian Infantry. He was wounded on two occasions during the war.

He was first elected to Parliament at the Perth riding in the 1949 general election. After one term in office he was defeated by Jay Monteith of the Progressive Conservative party in the 1953 federal election.
