= Al MacBain =

Canadian politician

Arthur Allister (Al) MacBain (4 September 1925 – 3 April 2003) was a Canadian lawyer and politician. McBain was a Liberal party member of the House of Commons of Canada. He was born in New Glasgow, Nova Scotia and became a barrister by career after graduating from Dalhousie University.

He represented Ontario's Niagara Falls electoral district in the 32nd Canadian Parliament after winning that riding in the 1980 federal election. MacBain left national politics after his defeat in the 1984 federal election.
