= Endorsements in the 2025 Liberal Party of Canada leadership election =

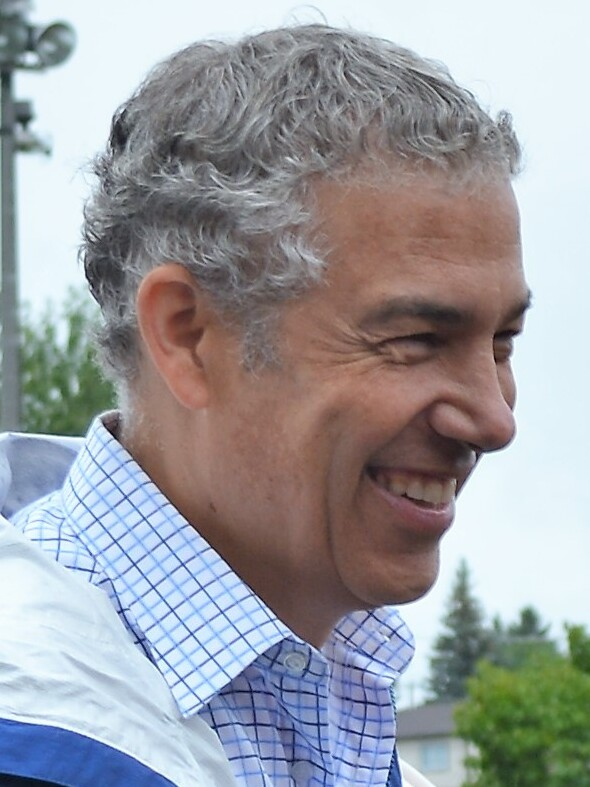
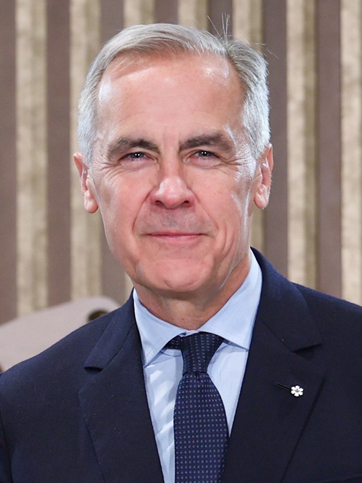
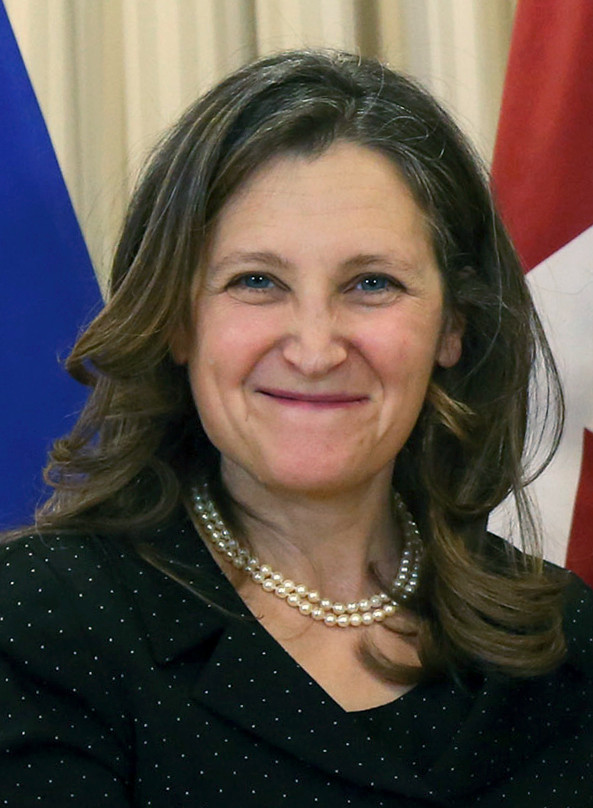
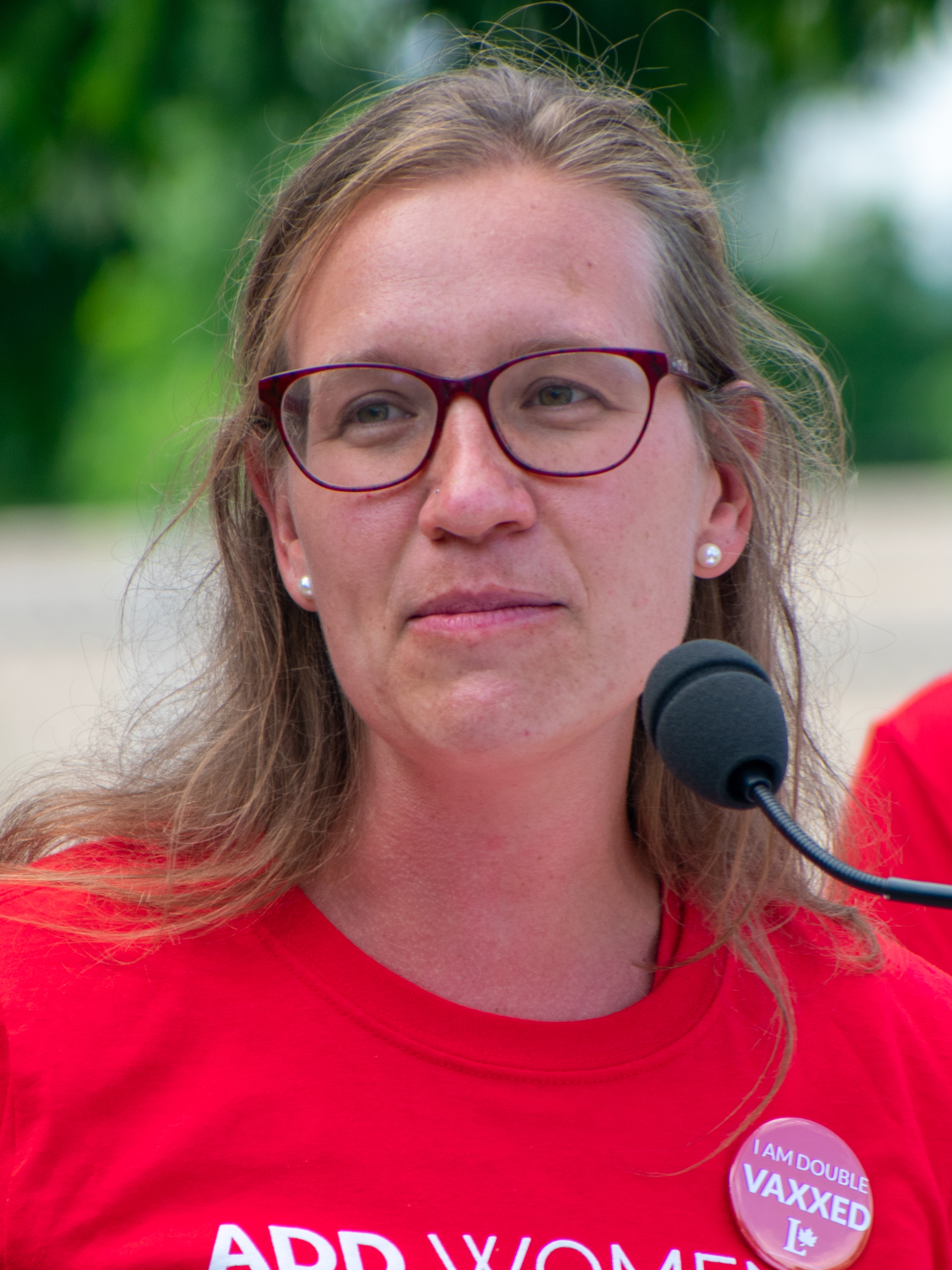
Candidates for the 2025 leadership election.
From left to right: Baylis, Carney, Freeland, Gould.

This is a list of notable individuals and entities who provided endorsements to declared candidates in the 2025 Liberal Party of Canada leadership election or had their expression of support reported in the media.

== Endorsements from incumbent Members of Parliament ==
The tallies of endorsements from sitting Liberal MPs were as follows:

Candidate	West & North					ON	QC	Atlantic				Total
Candidate	BC	AB	SK	MB	Terr	ON	QC	NB	NS	PEI	NL	Total
Frank Baylis	0	0	-	0	0	0	0	0	0	0	0	0
Mark Carney	7	1	-	0	2	31	14	4	3	3	4	69
Chrystia Freeland	3	1	-	3	0	13	5	0	1	0	1	27
Karina Gould	0	0	-	0	0	3	0	0	0	0	0	3
No endorsement	4	0	-	1	0	27	15	3	3	1	1	55
Total	14	2	0	4	2	73	33	6	7	4	6	151 (Note: This total does not include sitting members currently running for the leadership. As of February 1, 2025.)

As typical in leadership contests of major political parties in Canada and other countries with government based on the Westminster model, the public support of incumbent caucus members were the endorsements most prized by the contestants and most often cited by journalists and pundits.

The significance of endorsements generally speaking diminished over time as Canadian political parties uniformly shifted their leadership election processes from caucus votes to delegated convention in early 1900s and further to direct-voting by party members in early 2000s, as former public office holders and party officials no longer have formalized outsized votes through entitlement as automatic delegates. Only the tracking of current caucus support remained a key feature of leadership contests of all parties with significant parliamentary representation as they serve as readily demonstratable, quantifiable and reasonably comparable indicators of support commanded by the contestants. Such endorsements however do not always translate to actual strength, and the lacking of such support may not necessarily prevent a contestant from being competitive. (For example, Christy Clark, former premier of British Columbia who publicly explored a bid in the early weeks of this contest, won the 2011 BC Liberals leadership contest with endorsement from only one of the approximately fifty incumbent caucus members, while her two main rivals each claimed approximately twenty.)

In previous contests, the endorsements of Liberal Senators were also actively sought after by contestants and often given comparable prominence in news reporting. With the expulsion of all Liberals Senators from caucus in 2014 by party leader Justin Trudeau and the practice of appointing independent senators during his premiership, the number of senators who once held caucus membership gradually diminished. Only three former Liberal senators remained in office during this contest. In addition, Trudeau also appointed former Liberal MPs Rodger Cuzner and Nancy Karetak-Lindell and a number of former Liberal candidates, aides, provincial MLAs and partisan activists to the Senate during his premiership. Of the incumbent senators with documented affiliation to or membership with the party, Senator Percy Downe took a public position calling for the contest in November 2024 but did not endorse any of the contestants. No other incumbent senator played any visible role or expressed their support publicly for any of the contestant in this contest.

== Frank Baylis ==
=== Former Members of Parliament ===
- Celina Caesar-Chavannes, MP for Whitby (2015–2019).
- Clifford Lincoln, MP for Lac-Saint-Louis (1993–2004), member of the Quebec Cabinet (1985–1989), MNA for Nelligan (1981–1989).

=== Municipal politicians ===
- Benoit Langevin, Montreal city councillor, Pierrefonds-Roxboro (Bois-de-Liesse).

=== Other prominent individuals ===
- Francoise Baylis, Canadian bioethicist, President-elect of the Royal Society of Canada (2025–2028). (Sibling)
- Christian de la Cortina, Canadian actor and producer.

== Mark Carney ==
=== Members of Parliament ===
==== Atlantic Canada ====
- Jaime Battiste, MP for Sydney—Victoria (since 2019), withdrawn contestant
- Kody Blois, MP for Kings—Hants (since 2019).
- Serge Cormier, MP for Acadie—Bathurst (since 2015).
- Sean Fraser, MP for Central Nova (since 2015), cabinet minister (2019–2024)
- Gudie Hutchings, MP for Long Range Mountains (since 2015), Minister of Rural Economic Development (since 2021) and Minister responsible for the Atlantic Canada Opportunities Agency (since 2023)
- Yvonne Jones, MP for Labrador (since 2013), Leader of the Opposition (Newfoundland and Labrador) (2007–2012), Leader of the Liberal Party of Newfoundland and Labrador (2007–2011), MHA for Cartwright-L'Anse au Clair (1996–2013), Mayor of Mary's Harbour (1991–1996).
- Dominic LeBlanc, MP for Beauséjour (since 2000), Minister of Finance (since 2024) and Minister of Intergovernmental Affairs (2018–2019, since 2020), cabinet minister (since 2015)
- Wayne Long, MP for Saint John—Rothesay (since 2015)
- Lawrence MacAulay, MP for Cardigan (since 1988, longest serving sitting caucus member), Minister of Agriculture and Agri-Food (since 2023; 2015–2019), cabinet minister (1997–2002, since 2015)
- Heath MacDonald, MP for Malpeque (since 2021)
- Bobby Morrissey, MP for Egmont (since 2015), Prince Edward Island provincial minister (1986–1996), MLA for Tignish-Palmer Road (1982–2000)
- Seamus O'Regan, MP for St. John's South—Mount Pearl (since 2015), cabinet minister (2017–2024)
- Ginette Petitpas Taylor, MP for Moncton—Riverview—Dieppe (since 2015), President of the Treasury Board (since 2024), cabinet minister (2017–2019, since 2021)
- Joanne Thompson, MP for St. John's East (since 2021), Minister of Seniors (since 2024)

==== Quebec ====
- Rachel Bendayan, Minister of Official Languages and Associate Minister of Public Safety (2024–2025), MP for Outremont (2019–present).
- Élisabeth Brière, Minister of National Revenue (since 2024), MP for Sherbrooke (since 2019).
- François-Philippe Champagne, Minister of Innovation, Science and Industry (since 2021), MP for Saint-Maurice—Champlain (since 2015).
- Sophie Chatel, MP for Pontiac (since 2021).
- Anju Dhillon, MP for Dorval—Lachine—LaSalle (since 2015).
- Jean-Yves Duclos, Minister of Public Services and Procurement (since 2023), cabinet minister (since 2015), MP for Québec (since 2015).
- Steven Guilbeault, Minister of Environment and Climate Change (since 2021), cabinet minister since 2019, MP for Laurier–Sainte-Marie (since 2019).
- Mélanie Joly, Minister of Foreign Affairs (since 2021), cabinet minister (since 2015), MP for Ahuntsic-Cartierville (since 2015).
- Annie Koutrakis, MP for Vimy (since 2019).
- Joël Lightbound, MP for Louis-Hébert (since 2015).
- Steven MacKinnon, Leader of the Government in the House of Commons (2024, since 2025) and Minister of Employment, Workforce Development and Labour (since 2025), MP for Gatineau (since 2015).
- Marc Miller, Minister of Immigration, Refugees and Citizenship (since 2023), cabinet minister (since 2019), MP for Ville-Marie–Le Sud-Ouest–Île-des-Sœurs (since 2015).
- Sherry Romanado, MP for Longueuil—Charles-LeMoyne (since 2015).
- Pascale St-Onge, Minister of Canadian Heritage (since 2023), cabinet minister (since 2021), MP for Brome—Missisquoi (since 2021).
- Sameer Zuberi, MP for Pierrefonds—Dollard (since 2019).

==== Ontario ====
- Shafqat Ali, MP for Brampton Centre (2021–present).
- Anita Anand, Minister of Transport and Internal Trade (2024–2025), President of the Treasury Board (2023–2024), Minister of National Defence (2021–2023), MP for Oakville (2019–present).
- Gary Anandasangaree, Minister of Crown–Indigenous Relations (2023–2025), MP for Scarborough—Rouge Park (2015–present).
- Bill Blair, Minister of National Defence (since 2023), cabinet minister (since 2021), MP for Scarborough Southwest (since 2015), Chief of the Toronto Police Service (2005–2015).
- Valerie Bradford, MP for Kitchener South—Hespeler (since 2021).
- Ali Ehsassi, MP for Willowdale (since 2015).
- Nathaniel Erskine-Smith, Minister of Housing, Infrastructure and Communities (since 2024), MP for Beaches—East York (since 2015).
- Iqwinder Gaheer, MP for Mississauga—Malton (since 2021).
- Mark Gerretsen, Deputy Leader of the Government in the House of Commons (since 2023), MP for Kingston and the Islands (since 2015).
- Patty Hajdu, Minister of Indigenous Services (since 2021), cabinet minister (since 2015), MP for Thunder Bay—Superior North (since 2015).
- Marci Ien, Minister for Women and Gender Equality and Youth (since 2021), MP for Toronto Centre (since 2020).
- Helena Jaczek, MP for Markham—Stouffville (since 2019), cabinet minister (2019–2023), MPP for Oak Ridges—Markham (2007–2018), Ontario provincial minister (2014–2018)
- Arielle Kayabaga, MP for London West (since 2021)
- Kamal Khera, Minister of Diversity, Inclusion and Persons with Disabilities (since 2023), cabinet minister (since 2021), MP for Brampton West (since 2015).
- Irek Kusmierczyk, MP for Windsor—Tecumseh (2019–2025)
- Marie-France Lalonde, MP for Orléans (since 2019), MPP for Orléans (2014–2019), Ontario provincial minister (2017–2018)
- Viviane Lapointe, MP for Sudbury (since 2021).
- Tim Louis, MP for Kitchener—Conestoga (since 2019).
- David McGuinty, Minister of Public Safety (since 2024), MP for Ottawa South (2004–present).
- Marcus Powlowski, MP for Thunder Bay—Rainy River (since 2019).
- Anthony Rota, MP for Nipissing—Timiskaming (2004–2011, since 2015), Speaker of the House of Commons (2019–2023).
- Ruby Sahota, Minister of Democratic Institutions (since 2024), MP for Brampton North (since 2015).
- Marc Serré, MP for Nickel Belt (since 2015).
- Maninder Sidhu, MP for Brampton East (since 2019).
- Sonia Sidhu, MP for Brampton South (since 2015).
- Francesco Sorbara, MP for Vaughan—Woodbridge (since 2015).
- Jenna Sudds, Minister of Families, Children and Social Development (since 2023), MP for Kanata—Carleton (since 2021).
- Ryan Turnbull, MP for Whitby (since 2019).
- Rechie Valdez, Minister of Small Business (since 2023), MP for Mississauga—Streetsville (since 2021).
- Adam van Koeverden, MP for Milton (since 2019).
- Salma Zahid, MP for Scarborough Centre (since 2015).

==== Western Canada and Territories ====
- Parm Bains, MP for Steveston—Richmond East (since 2021)
- George Chahal, MP for Calgary Skyview (since 2021) Calgary City Councillor (2017–2021).
- Sukh Dhaliwal, MP for Surrey—Newton (since 2015) and Newton—North Delta (2006–2011).
- Brendan Hanley, MP for Yukon (since 2021).
- Michael McLeod, MP for Northwest Territories (since 2015).
- Joyce Murray, MP for Vancouver Quadra (since 2008), cabinet minister (2019–2023), MLA for New Westminster (2001–2005), BC provincial minister (2001–2005), leadership contestant in 2013.
- Harjit Sajjan, President of the King's Privy Council for Canada and Minister of Emergency Preparedness (since 2023), cabinet minister (since 2015), MP for Vancouver South (since 2015).
- Randeep Sarai, MP for Surrey Centre (since 2015).
- Patrick Weiler, MP for West Vancouver—Sunshine Coast—Sea to Sky Country (since 2019).
- Jonathan Wilkinson, Minister of Energy and Natural Resources (since 2021), cabinet minister (since 2018), MP for North Vancouver (since 2015).

=== Former Members of Parliament ===
==== Atlantic Canada ====
- Scott Brison, cabinet minister (2004–2006, 2015–2019), MP for Kings—Hants (1997–2019), Progressive Conservative leadership contestant in 2003, Liberal leadership contestant in 2006.
- Geoff Regan, Speaker of the House of Commons (2015–2019), cabinet minister (2003–2006), MP for Halifax West (2000–2021, 1993–1997).
- Brian Tobin, cabinet minister (1993–1996, 2000–2002), MP for Humber—St. Barbe—Baie Verte (1980–1996) and for Bonavista—Trinity—Conception (2000–2002), Premier of Newfoundland and Labrador (1996–2000), Leader of the Liberal Party of Newfoundland and Labrador (1996–2000).

==== Quebec ====
- Marc Garneau, cabinet minister (2015–2021), MP for Notre-Dame-de-Grâce—Westmount (2008–2023), President of the Canadian Space Agency (2001–2007).
- David Lametti, Minister of Justice (2019–2023), MP for LaSalle—Émard—Verdun (2015–2024).

==== Ontario ====
- Navdeep Bains, Minister of Innovation, Science and Industry (2015–2021), MP for Mississauga—Malton (2015–2021) and Mississauga—Brampton South (2004–02-11).
- Don Boudria, cabinet minister (1996–2002), MP for Glengarry—Prescott—Russell(1984–2006), MPP for Prescott and Russell (1981–84).
- Bonnie Crombie, incumbent Leader of the Ontario Liberal Party (since 2023), MP for Mississauga—Streetsville (2008–2011), Mayor of Mississauga (2014–2024)
- Catherine McKenna, cabinet minister (2015–2021), MP for Ottawa Centre (15–2021).

==== Western Canada ====
- Anne McLellan, Deputy Prime Minister (2004–2006), cabinet minister (1993–2004), MP for Edmonton Centre/West (1993–2006).
- Douglas Roche, Progressive Conservative MP for Edmonton South/Edmonton—Strathcona (1972–1984, defeated Carney's father Robert Carney in the 1980 election), Senator from Alberta (1998–2004).
- Lee Richardson, Progressive Conservative/Conservative Party MP for Calgary Southeast (1988–1993), Calgary Centre (2004–2012)

=== Former Provincial and Territorial politicians ===
- Dwight Duncan, Deputy Premier of Ontario (2011–2013), Minister of Finance (2005–2006; 2007–2013), MPP for Windsor—Tecumseh (1995–2013).
- Margaret Miller, MLA for Hants East (2013–2021).
- George Smitherman, Deputy Premier of Ontario (2006–2009), Minister of Health and Long-Term Care (2003–2008), Minister of Energy and Infrastructure (2008–2009), MPP for Toronto Centre (1999–2010).

=== International politicians ===
- Michael Bloomberg, Mayor of New York City (2002–2013), candidate in the 2020 Democratic Party presidential primary.

=== Other prominent individuals ===
- Mike Pemberton, chair of the Liberal Party of Canada (Yukon).

== Chrystia Freeland ==
=== Members of Parliament ===
==== Atlantic Canada ====
- Lena Diab, MP for Halifax West (since 2021), Nova Scotia provincial minister (2013–2021), MLA for Halifax Armdale (2013–2021).
- Ken McDonald, MP for Avalon (since 2015), Mayor of Conception Bay South (2013–2015).

==== Quebec ====
- Marie-Claude Bibeau, cabinet minister (2015–2024), MP for Compton—Stanstead (since 2015).
- Anthony Housefather, MP for Mount Royal (since 2015), Mayor of Côte Saint-Luc (2005–2015).
- Stéphane Lauzon, MP for Argenteuil—La Petite-Nation (since 2015).
- Diane Lebouthillier, Minister of Fisheries, Oceans and the Canadian Coast Guard (since 2023), cabinet minister (since 2015), MP for Gaspésie—Les Îles-de-la-Madeleine (since 2015).
- Alexandra Mendès, MP for Brossard—Saint-Lambert (since 2015) and Brossard—La Prairie (2008–2011), president of the Quebec wing of the Liberal Party of Canada (2012–2014).

==== Ontario ====
- Yvan Baker, MP for Etobicoke Centre (since 2019), MPP for Etobicoke Centre (2014–2018).
- Michael Coteau, MP for Don Valley East (since 2021), Ontario provincial minister (2013–2018), MPP for Don Valley East (2011–2021).
- Julie Dabrusin, MP for Toronto—Danforth (since 2015).
- Mark Holland, Minister of Health (since 2023), cabinet minister (since 2021), MP for Ajax (since 2015) and Ajax—Pickering (2004–2011).
- Ahmed Hussen, Minister of International Development (since 2023), cabinet minister (since 2017), MP for York South—Weston (since 2015).
- Lloyd Longfield, MP for Guelph (since 2015).
- James Maloney, MP for Etobicoke—Lakeshore (since 2015), Toronto City Councillor (2014).
- John McKay, MP for Scarborough—Guildwood/East (since 1997).
- Rob Oliphant, MP for Don Valley West (2008–11, since 2015).
- Leah Taylor Roy, MP for Aurora—Oak Ridges—Richmond Hill (since 2021).
- Anita Vandenbeld, MP for Ottawa West—Nepean (since 2015).
- Arif Virani, Minister of Justice and Attorney General of Canada (2023–2025), MP for Parkdale—High Park (since 2015).
- Jean Yip, MP for Scarborough—Agincourt (since 2017).

==== Western Canada ====
- Terry Beech, Minister of Citizens' Services (since 2023), MP for Burnaby North—Seymour (since 2015).
- Randy Boissonnault, MP for Edmonton Centre (2015–2019, since 2021), cabinet minister (2021–2024)
- Ben Carr, MP for Winnipeg South Centre (since 2023).
- Hedy Fry, MP for Vancouver Centre (1993–present), cabinet minister (1996–2002)
- Ken Hardie, MP for Fleetwood—Port Kells (since 2015).
- Kevin Lamoureux, MP for Winnipeg North (since 2010), MLA for Inkster (1988–1999, 2003–2010).
- Dan Vandal, Minister of Northern Affairs (since 2019), MP for Saint Boniface—Saint Vital (since 2015).

=== Former Members of Parliament ===
- Lloyd Axworthy, Minister of Foreign Affairs (1996–2000), cabinet minister (1980–1984, 1993–2000) MP for Winnipeg South Centre (1979–2000).
- Wayne Easter, Solicitor General (2002–2003), MP for Malpeque (1993–2021).
- Allan Rock, Minister of Justice (1993–1997), cabinet minister (1993–2003), MP for Etobicoke Centre (1993–2003).
- Scott Simms, MP for Bonavista—Gander—Grand Falls—Windsor (2004–2015), Coast of Bays—Central—Notre Dame (2015–2021).
- Paul Zed, MP for Fundy—Royal (1993–1997), Saint John (2004–2008).

=== Members of Provincial and Territorial legislatures ===
- Kieron Testart, MLA for Range Lake (2023–present) and Kam Lake (2015–2019).

=== Other prominent individuals ===
- Bill Browder, CEO and co-founder of Hermitage Capital Management.
- Larry Summers, United States Secretary of the Treasury (1999–2001), American economist

== Karina Gould ==
=== Members of Parliament ===
- Pam Damoff, MP for Oakville North—Burlington (since 2015).
- Lisa Hepfner, MP for Hamilton Mountain (since 2021).
- Ya'ara Saks, Minister of Mental Health and Addictions (since 2023), MP for York Centre (since 2020).

=== Former Members of Parliament ===
- Sheila Copps, Deputy Prime Minister (1993–1997), cabinet minister (1993–2003), MP for Hamilton East (1984–2004), leadership contestant in 1990 and 2003, MPP for Hamilton Centre (1981–84)
- Maryam Monsef, cabinet minister (2015–2021), MP for Peterborough—Kawartha (2015–2021).
- Adam Vaughan, MP for Spadina—Fort York/Trinity—Spadina (2014–2021).

=== Former Provincial and Territorial politicians ===
- Kevin Vickers, Leader of the Liberal Party of New Brunswick (2019–2020), Sergeants-at-Arms of the Canadian House of Commons (2006–2015).
