= Jack Burghardt =

Canadian politician

John O. Burghardt (19 September 1929 – 28 September 2002) was a Canadian television news broadcaster, politician and church minister.

Born in Port Colborne, Ontario, Burghardt became one of the first on-air personalities on CHCH-TV in Hamilton, Ontario. He moved to London's CFPL-TV in 1971 and became that station's news anchor. He remained at CFPL until 1980, apart from a break in 1972 to seek a seat in federal Parliament.

His first attempt to gain a seat in the House of Commons of Canada was unsuccessful. He campaigned as the Liberal Party candidate in the Hamilton West electoral district during the 1972 federal election.

His second attempt was in a 1981 by-election in the London West electoral district. He served in the remainder of the 32nd Canadian Parliament, replacing Judd Buchanan who resigned his seat. Burghardt was defeated in the 1984 federal election by Progressive Conservative candidate Tom Hockin.

After leaving federal politics, Burghardt entered municipal politics. He was first elected to Board of Control in 1985. As he garnered the most votes, he attained the position of Deputy Mayor. He was re-elected to both positions in 1988 and 1991. He ran for mayor in 1994, but narrowly lost to fellow controller Dianne Haskett. A long-time lay preacher, he was ordained a minister of the United Church of Canada in later life.

Burghardt died in London aged 73 following surgery.
