= Mauril Bélanger =

Canadian politician (1955–2016)

The Honourable Mauril Bélanger PC
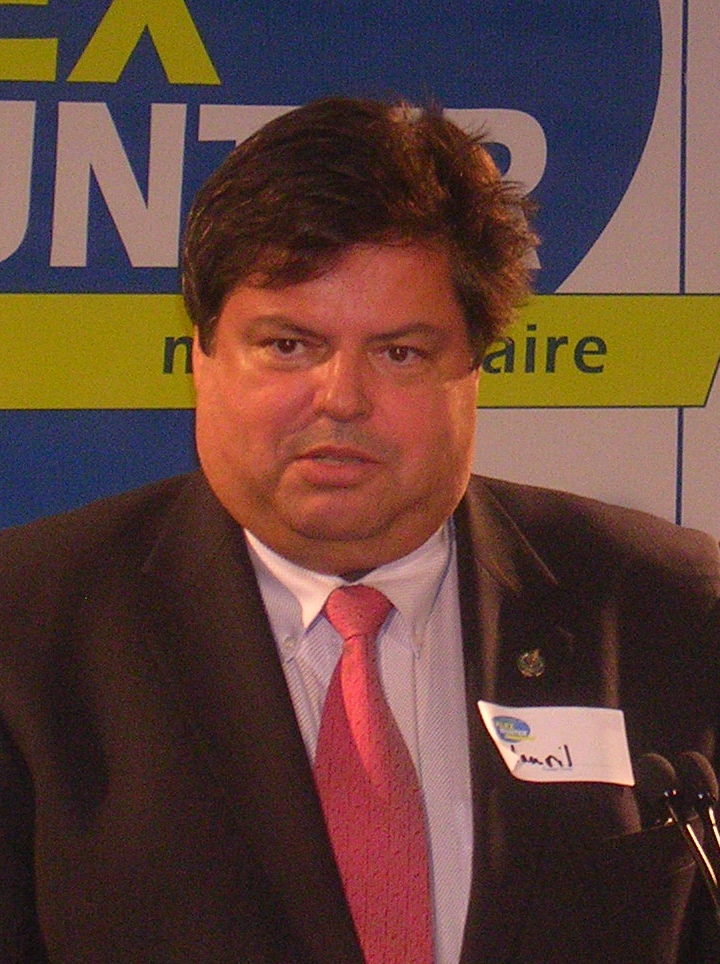

Minister for Internal Trade
- In office May 17, 2005 – February 6, 2006
- Prime Minister: Paul Martin

Associate Minister of National Defence
- In office July 20, 2004 – February 6, 2006
- Prime Minister: Paul Martin
- Preceded by: Albina Guarnieri
- Succeeded by: Julian Fantino (2011)

Deputy Leader of the Government in the House of Commons
- In office December 12, 2003 – February 6, 2006
- Prime Minister: Paul Martin
- Preceded by: Paul DeVillers
- Succeeded by: Scott Reid

Chief Government Whip
- In office 2003–2004
- Prime Minister: Paul Martin
- Preceded by: Marlene Catterall
- Succeeded by: Karen Redman

Member of Parliament for Ottawa—Vanier
- In office February 13, 1995 – August 15, 2016
- Preceded by: Jean-Robert Gauthier
- Succeeded by: Mona Fortier

Personal details
- Born: June 15, 1955 Mattawa, Ontario, Canada
- Died: August 15, 2016 (aged 61) Ottawa, Ontario, Canada
- Party: Liberal
- Spouse: Catherine Bélanger
- Occupation: Administrator, political adviser

Mauril Joseph Adrien Jules Bélanger PC (June 15, 1955 – August 15, 2016) was a Canadian politician.

A member of the Liberal Party of Canada, he represented Ottawa—Vanier in the House of Commons through a by-election victory in 1995 until his death in 2016. Bélanger also served in cabinet during the premiership of Paul Martin as Minister responsible for Official Languages, Associate Minister of National Defence, Minister responsible for Democratic Reform, and Minister for Internal Trade.

He was considered a frontrunner for the position of Speaker of the House of Commons after his 8th electoral victory during the 2015 federal election, but withdrew after being diagnosed with amyotrophic lateral sclerosis, which caused his death in 2016.

== Early life ==
Bélanger was born the second of five children in Mattawa, Ontario, a small logging town in northeastern Ontario where the Mattawa and Ottawa Rivers meet. He graduated from the University of Ottawa in 1977, where he had served as President of the Student Federation. In the early 1980s, he worked for Jean-Luc Pépin, then Minister of Transport. In the mid to late 1980s, he worked as a registered investment advisor. He was then the Chief of Staff to Peter Clark (Chair of the Regional Council of Ottawa-Carleton).

== Politics ==
Bélanger was first elected to Parliament on February 13, 1995, in a by-election in the riding of Ottawa—Vanier, which has a large Francophone population. His predecessor, Jean-Robert Gauthier, was appointed to the Senate. Ottawa–Vanier is considered a solid Liberal riding, having returned a Liberal MP since its creation as Ottawa East in 1935, usually in a landslide. Bélanger himself won by large margins in the 1997, 2000, 2004, 2006, and 2008 elections. He won re-election for a seventh term by a reduced margin with 38.2% of the vote in the May 2011 election. In the October 2015 election, Bélanger had his largest margin since the 1997 election.

=== Chrétien and Martin years ===
As member of Parliament, Bélanger served as chair of the Standing Committee on Official Languages, member of the Standing Committee on the Library of Parliament and member of the Prime Minister's Task Force on Urban Issues. From July 1998 to August 2000, he was Parliamentary Secretary to the Minister of Canadian Heritage. In December 2003, he was appointed Deputy Leader of the Government in the House of Commons and Chief Government Whip.

In the government of Paul Martin, Bélanger served as Minister responsible for Official Languages, Associate Minister of National Defence, Minister responsible for Democratic Reform, and Minister for Internal Trade.

=== Opposition ===
Bélanger was re-elected in the 2006 federal election, and served as the Official Opposition critic for Canadian Heritage from February 2006 to January 2007, when he began a nine-month stint as critic for Infrastructure and Communities under new Liberal leader Stéphane Dion. From October 2007 to March 2008, Bélanger served as the Official Opposition critic for Official Languages, Canadian Heritage, and the Francophonie. After Bélanger won his seat once more in the 2008 federal election, he was appointed as Official Opposition critic for Official Languages in March 2010 by Liberal leader Michael Ignatieff. After Bélanger's re-election in the 2011 federal election, he continued as his party's critic on this file under interim leader Bob Rae until May 2012. After Justin Trudeau's election as Liberal leader, Bélanger was appointed the party's critic for Cooperatives in August 2013.

=== Return to government ===
Following his re-election in the 2015 federal election, Bélanger submitted his name for the position of Speaker of the House of Commons and was considered a front-runner for the post. However, on November 30, Bélanger announced that he was withdrawing as a candidate for speaker after he received a diagnosis of amyotrophic lateral sclerosis (ALS). Despite his diagnosis, Bélanger continued as MP for Ottawa—Vanier.

In December 2015, fellow Ottawa-area Liberal MP Andrew Leslie presented a motion in the house to name Bélanger honorary Speaker of the House of Commons and the right to sit in the chair for a future day. In January 2016, Bélanger became the first MP to use a voice generator in the House of Commons when he used an app on his tablet to introduce a private member's bill to amend the lyrics of "O Canada" to make them gender-neutral, which he had failed to do through a similar bill in the last parliament by a 144–127 vote. On March 9, 2016, Bélanger sat in the Speaker's chair for one day, and presided over the proceedings with the aid of an iPad app that produced a computerized voice. This honour made Bélanger the first honorary speaker of the house for a day.

On May 6, 2016, consideration of Bélanger's bill to make the national anthem gender-neutral was blocked when Conservative MPs used up the hour of debate time and refused consent to two motions backed by both the Liberals and the NDP to extend debate and allow time to hold a vote to send the bill to committee. As Bélanger's health was deteriorating, Liberal MP Greg Fergus described the Conservative's procedural delay tactics as an attempt to prevent Bélanger from seeing the bill passed, while Conservative MPs insisted that they were debating an important issue and had followed parliamentary procedure. Fellow Liberal MP Linda Lapointe gave up her timeslot for private member's business on May 30 to allow Bélanger's bill to be heard and go to a vote for it to be sent to committee the following day. In June 2016, the bill passed its third reading with a vote of 225 to 74 in the House of Commons. In July 2017, the bill was in its third, and final, reading in the Senate; the bill was passed on January 31, 2018 and received royal assent on February 7, 2018 to change "in all thy sons command" to "in all of us command", after Bélanger had already died.

=== Positions ===
Bélanger earned recognition for his promotion of francophone rights. In 2012, he asked the House of Commons to create a committee to examine the role of co-ops in the Canadian economy. This motion was unanimously passed by the House of Commons. He presided over the Canadian House of Commons for one day as an honorary Speaker on March 9, 2016, a job he aspired to before his diagnosis with amyotrophic lateral sclerosis (ALS). Later that year, Bélanger became the National Honorary Spokesperson for the ALS Societies' Across Canada WALK for ALS.

== Honours ==
He was given the title of Commandeur de Ordre de la Pléiade, a francophone order which focuses on contributions made to international friendship and cooperation, in 2005. In 2007, László Sólyom, President of Hungary, made him an Officer of the Order of Merit of the Republic of Hungary. In April 2009, the Royal Canadian Legion recognized Bélanger for his contribution to the promotion of goodwill. In June 2016, Bélanger received the CHF Canada Award for Outstanding Contribution to Co-operative Housing for effecting positive, large scale change to the co-op housing sector. It was also published within the Canada Gazette of 30 July 2016 that he was awarded with the Grand Cross of the National Order of Honour and Merit, Silver Plaque of the Republic of Haiti.

== Death ==
Bélanger died at age 61 of amyotrophic lateral sclerosis on August 15, 2016. He was survived by his wife, Catherine. He was succeeded in the by-election by Mona Fortier.

== Electoral record ==
Source, unless otherwise stated:

2015 Canadian federal election
Party	Candidate	Votes	%	±%	Expenditures
Liberal	Mauril Bélanger	36,474	57.57	+19.47	$163,698.89
New Democratic	Emilie Taman	12,194	19.25	-9.43	$123,293.39
Conservative	David Piccini	12,109	19.11	-8.84	$74,698.91
Green	Nira Dookeran	1,947	3.07	-1.99	$8,775.54
Libertarian	Coreen Corcoran	503	0.79	–	$747.12
Marxist–Leninist	Christian Legeais	128	0.2	-0.03	–
Total valid votes/expense limit		63,355	100.0		$219,479.72
Total rejected ballots		418	–	–	
Turnout		63,773	–	–	
Eligible voters		83,570			
Source: Elections Canada

2011 Canadian federal election: Ottawa—Vanier
Party	Candidate	Votes	%	±%	Expenditures
Liberal	Mauril Bélanger	20,009	38.17	-8.03	
New Democratic	Trevor Haché	15,391	29.36	+12.30	
Conservative	Rem Westland	14,184	27.06	-0.22	
Green	Caroline Rioux	2,716	5.18	-3.40	
Marxist–Leninist	Christian Legeais	122	0.23	-0.02	
Total valid votes/expense limit		52,422	100.00		
Total rejected ballots		316	0.60	+0.07	
Turnout		52,738	68.24	+4.20	

2008 Canadian federal election: Ottawa—Vanier
Party	Candidate	Votes	%	±%	Expenditures
Liberal	Mauril Bélanger	23,948	46.20	+3.89	$79,668
Conservative	Patrick Glémaud	14,138	27.28	-1.39	$53,405
New Democratic	Trevor Haché	8,845	17.06	-4.75	$30,040
Green	Akbar Manoussi	4,447	8.58	+1.98	$3,842
Independent	Robert Larter	227	0.44	–	
Marxist–Leninist	Christian Legeais	130	0.25	+0.04	
Canadian Action	Michel St-Onge	100	0.19	–	$149
Total valid votes/expense limit		51,835	100.00	$85,605	
Total rejected ballots		277	0.53		
Turnout		52,112	64.04		
Liberal hold		Swing	+2.64		

2006 Canadian federal election: Ottawa—Vanier
Party	Candidate	Votes	%	±%
Liberal	Mauril Bélanger	23,567	42.31	-6.86
Conservative	Paul Benoit	15,970	28.67	+4.48
New Democratic	Ric Dagenais	12,145	21.81	+3.27
Green	Raphaël Thierrin	3,675	6.60	-0.27
Progressive Canadian	James C. Parsons	221	0.40	
Marxist–Leninist	Alexandre Legeais	117	0.21	-0.28
Total valid votes		55,695	100.00	
Liberal hold		Swing	-5.67	

2004 Canadian federal election: Ottawa—Vanier
Party	Candidate	Votes	%	±%
Liberal	Mauril Bélanger	25,952	49.17	-6.40
Conservative	Kevin Friday	12,769	24.19	-6.95
New Democratic	Ric Dagenais	9,787	18.54	+9.83
Green	Raphaël Thierrin	3,628	6.87	+4.62
Marijuana	Carol Taylor	558	1.06	-0.45
Marxist–Leninist	Françoise Roy	85	0.49	+0.34
Total valid votes		52,779	100.00	

2000 Canadian federal election: Ottawa—Vanier
Party	Candidate	Votes	%	±%
Liberal	Mauril Bélanger	26,749	55.57	-6.30
Alliance	Nestor Gayowsky	7,590	15.77	+5.97
Progressive Conservative	Stephen Woollcombe	7,400	15.37	+1.77
New Democratic	Joseph Zebrowski	4,194	8.71	-3.28
Green	Adam Sommerfeld	1,083	2.25	+0.94
Marijuana	Raymond Turmel	728	1.51	
Natural Law	Pierrette Blondin	187	0.39	-0.27
Canadian Action	Raymond Samuéls	131	0.27	
Marxist–Leninist	Kim Roberge	74	0.15	-0.13
Total valid votes		48,136	100.00	

1997 Canadian federal election: Ottawa—Vanier
Party	Candidate	Votes	%	±%
Liberal	Mauril Bélanger	30,728	61.87	+1.14
Progressive Conservative	Luc Edmund Barrick	6,754	13.60	+3.92
New Democratic	David Gagnon	5,952	11.99	+5.57
Reform	Roy Grant	4,868	9.80	-10.76
Green	Richard Guy Briggs	651	1.31	
Natural Law	Roger Bouchard	330	0.66	+0.10
Independent	César Antonio Bello	241	0.49	
Marxist–Leninist	Robert Rival	138	0.28	-0.03
Total valid votes		49,662	100.00	

Canadian federal by-election, February 13, 1995: Ottawa—Vanier
Party	Candidate	Votes	%	±%	Expenditures
Liberal	Mauril Bélanger	11,918	60.06	−10.41	$52,001
Reform	Kevin Gaudet	4,034	20.33	+12.44	$36,995
Progressive Conservative	Françoise Guenette	1,899	9.57	−0.96	$30,933
New Democratic Party	Bob Lawson	1,259	6.34	−0.16	$5,764
Christian Heritage	Gilles Gauthier	299	1.51		$1,751
Green	Frank de Jong	218	1.10	−0.24	$0
Natural Law	Ian A.G. Campbell	109	0.55	−0.35	$131
Marxist-Leninist	Serge Lafortune	61	0.31	+0.02	$136
Abolitionist	John Turmel	46	0.23	+0.17	$0
Total valid votes		19,843	100.00		
Total rejected ballots		201			
Turnout		20,004	30.39	−32.04	
Electors on the lists		65,824			

1976 Ottawa municipal election: By-St. George's Ward
Candidate	Votes	%
Georges Bedard (X)	3,785	84.51
Mauril Bélanger	694	15.49

== Archives ==
There is a Mauril Bélanger fonds at Library and Archives Canada.

27th Canadian Ministry (2003–2006) – Cabinet of Paul Martin
Cabinet posts (3)
Predecessor	Office	Successor
vacant	Minister for Internal Trade; 2005–2006	vacant
Albina Guarnieri	Associate Minister of National Defence; 2004–2006	vacant – post next held by Julian Fantino
	Minister of State; 2003–2004 styled as Deputy Leader of the Government in the House of Commons	
Special Cabinet Responsibilities
Predecessor	Title	Successor
Pierre Pettigrew	Minister responsible for Official Languages; 2004–2006	Josée Verner
Jacques Saada	Minister responsible for Democratic Reform; 2004–2005	Position retitled – see Belinda Stronach
Special Parliamentary Responsibilities
Predecessor	Title	Successor
Paul DeVillers	Deputy Leader of the Government in the House of Commons (Canada); 2003–2006	Scott Reid
