= Carol Baird Ellan =

Canadian lawyer and jurist

Chief Judge – British Columbia Provincial Court
- In office 2000–2005
- Preceded by: Robert W. Metzger
- Succeeded by: Hugh C. Stansfield

Personal details
- Born: Carol Cecilia Baird; 1957 (age 68–69) Vancouver, British Columbia
- Party: New Democratic Party
- Spouse: Tim Ellan
- Profession: Lawyer, judge, politician
- Website: Carol Baird Ellan

Carol Baird Ellan, K.C. is a Canadian retired judge, the former Chief Judge of the Provincial Court of British Columbia, and a former federal political candidate. Appointed Chief Judge on July 14, 2000 at age 43, she was the second youngest chief judge in BC history and the first female chief of the BC Provincial Court.

Baird Ellan currently lives on the Sunshine Coast of BC with her husband Tim, with whom she practiced law and family mediation under the firm name Ellan Community Law until 2014. They volunteer with and have served as the Northwest Region representatives for Retrouvaille International, a marriage support charity. Baird Ellan continues a legal practice in family and civil mediation, and disciplinary adjudication. She was appointed King's Counsel in December 2023. Tim and Carol have five adult children who live in BC, four grandchildren, all on the Sunshine Coast.

In February 2015, Baird Ellan received the nomination of the New Democratic Party of Canada in the federal riding of Burnaby North—Seymour in the 2015 federal election. The riding was created by the federal redistricting of 2012, and comprises a section of North Vancouver east of Lynn Creek North Vancouver and the section of Burnaby north of the Lougheed Highway Burnaby—Douglas.

== Background ==
Baird Ellan was born Carol Cecilia Baird in Vancouver in 1956, but at a young age moved with her family to Oa'hu, Hawaii, where she attended Kailua High School. The family returned to Vancouver in 1972, where Baird Ellan completed her high school education at Point Grey Secondary School in 1973 at the age of 16, and enrolled in the University of British Columbia. An avid guitarist from a young age, Baird Ellan initially pursued a degree in music, but soon transferred to the Faculty of Commerce, having resolved to attend law school after a memorable high school law course. She was accepted at UBC Law School in 1976, after her third year of undergraduate studies, and graduated 7th in her class in 1979, at 22. After her call to the bar in 1980, she joined Thornsteinssons, a tax law firm in Vancouver.

In 1983, Baird Ellan followed her husband Tim into a career as a Crown prosecutor, maintaining a focus in criminal law until 1993, when she was appointed as a judge. After a short period presiding in small claims court, she was relocated to Vancouver's Main Street criminal court, in the city's notorious Downtown Eastside, western Canada's largest criminal court. She served as Administrative Judge there from 1985 until her appointment as Associate Chief Judge in 1999 and then Chief Judge of the BC Provincial Court in 2000. She completed a five-year term as Chief Judge, and returned to preside in North Vancouver Provincial Court from 2005 until her retirement in 2012.

Baird Ellan has an identical twin, Kathryn, who resides in West Vancouver. Her father, Thomas Baird, a retired advertising executive, resided in Vancouver until his death in December 2022, while her mother, Nancy Baird, a retired executive word processor, lives on the Sunshine Coast. She also has a brother, Andrew, who resides on Vancouver Island.

== Legal career ==
Baird Ellan financed her college and law school education teaching guitar lessons, working as a bank teller, and taking part-time law clerk positions doing research and annotating case books for the BC Supreme Court. After graduation and a brief vacation in Europe, she commenced articles with a maritime law firm but transferred mid-year to a larger firm, Ladner Downs [now Borden Ladner Gervais], shortly before the maritime firm dissolved. Having sought a litigation position, she was placed in the corporate section and soon followed a law school friend to pursue a tax litigation career at Thorsteinssons, where she practiced for 2½ years. In 1983, she moved to the Vancouver Prosecutor's Office, where she appeared in all levels of criminal court, culminating in an assignment to the Criminal Appeals and Special Prosecutions section, and one memorable appearance in the Supreme Court of Canada. During those years, Baird Ellan had her five children, in 1984, 1986, 1987, 1990 and 1992.

She appeared before the Supreme Court of Canada in the case of R. v. V.T., [1992] 1 S.C.R. 749, on January 29, 1992. The case involved a minor assault by a young offender on a group home staff member, and engaged the issue of whether a judge could dismiss a charge based on his assessment of the case as too minor to justify a conviction. Acting for the Crown, Baird Ellan sought to uphold the ultimate discretion of the Crown to determine whether a charge should proceed. Having lost in the BC Court of Appeal, she sought leave to appeal. Though seldom granted by the Supreme Court for Crown appeals, the Court decided that the case engaged important legal principles, and assigned the full bench of nine judges to hear the appeal. Baird Ellan appeared alone to argue the case while 7 months pregnant with her fifth child, and was successful in achieving an unprecedented unanimous reversal of the Court of Appeal's decision.

A year after the delivery of her fifth child, Baird Ellan was appointed to the Provincial Court by NDP Attorney General Colin Gabelmann, at age 36, as part of a small claims backlog reduction initiative, along with her longtime friends and colleagues, Conni Bagnall and Ellen Burdett, and classmate, the late Chief Judge Hugh Stansfield.

=== 2002 Courthouse Closures ===
In January 2002, Gordon Campbell's BC Liberal government announced plans to permanently close 24 provincial courthouses to achieve cost savings. In response, Chief Judge Baird Ellan issued a press release protesting the closures, and wrote privately to then-attorney general Geoff Plant, arguing that the government had made an "unlawful" decision to plan these closures without the consultation of the judiciary, and asserting that Plant had "lost the confidence" of the judiciary. Baird Ellan suggested that these closures were a potential Charter violation of communities' access to justice rights, as a number of the courthouses planned for closure were already operating at 100% capacity, and many serviced communities that had no nearby alternative. Under Baird Ellan's direction, the Provincial Court Judiciary prepared an assessment of the impact of the courthouse closures.

The judiciary's resistance to the closures triggered a major public dispute, and the launch of a constitutional challenge of the government decision by the Law Society of British Columbia. The legal proceedings resulted in publication of the "confidential" letter and further heated public debate about the proper role of the judiciary in speaking out and leading such challenges to government decisions.

In May 2002 a memorandum of understanding was signed between the judiciary and the Attorney General's office, which delayed the closure of some courts and provided for temporary circuit courts as caseloads transitioned to the remaining courthouses. The Law Society action was discontinued. By the end of 2002, courthouse service in over a dozen cities in British Columbia was ended permanently, but many of the originally proposed closures were maintained as circuit courts.

=== Further challenges as Chief Judge ===
In 2002, Baird Ellan was advised of the possibility of a criminal investigation into a judge presiding in Prince George. She took immediate steps to have the judge removed from his sitting duties and placed under a conduct investigation, following which several young female complainants came forward with allegations of sexual abuse at the hands of the judge. Judge David Ramsay was ultimately convicted of several counts of sexual assault in 2004, and sentenced to seven years' imprisonment. He died in prison, in 2008.

After the end of her term as Chief Judge, Baird Ellan declined to pursue the customary elevation to Supreme Court and elected to resume sitting as a judge in her community of North Vancouver. During her seven years presiding there, she published more than 300 decisions in the criminal, small claims and family spheres. These, as well as her decisions prior to 2005, may be viewed on www.canlii.org.

In 2012, Baird Ellan retired from the Provincial Court bench and resumed practice as a lawyer, concentrating in family law and family mediation. For the next decade, she worked primarily for low income clients at nominal rates, or pro bono, assisting clients who were unable to afford the customary legal fees charged by experienced family lawyers.

== Political career ==
In February 2015, Baird Ellan won the NDP nomination for Burnaby-North Seymour. While seeking to earn the nomination, Baird Ellan was endorsed by then Burnaby mayor, Derek Corrigan. Baird Ellan has stated that she opposes the Kinder Morgan Pipeline expansion, like then Burnaby-Douglas MP, Kennedy Stewart, now Mayor of Vancouver. She lost to Liberal candidate Terry Beech.

2015 Canadian federal election: Burnaby North—Seymour
Party	Candidate	Votes	%	±%	Expenditures
Liberal	Terry Beech	18,938	36.09	+20.37	$116,099.41
New Democratic	Carol Baird Ellan	15,537	29.61	–5.55	$151,963.09
Conservative	Mike Little	14,612	27.84	–16.39	$74,815.44
Green	Lynne Quarmby	2,765	5.27	+1.39	$104,104.37
Libertarian	Chris Tylor	252	0.48	–	none listed
Independent	Helen Hee Soon Chang	207	0.39	–	$3,526.43
Communist	Brent Jantzen	126	0.24	–	none listed
Marxist–Leninist	Brian Sproule	43	0.08	–	none listed
Total valid votes/expense limit		52,480	99.51	–	$206,738.46
Total rejected ballots		260	0.49	–	
Turnout		52,740	70.34	–	
Eligible voters		74,982			
Liberal gain from Conservative		Swing		+18.38	
Source: Elections Canada
