= Lynne Quarmby =

Canadian scientist, activist, and politician

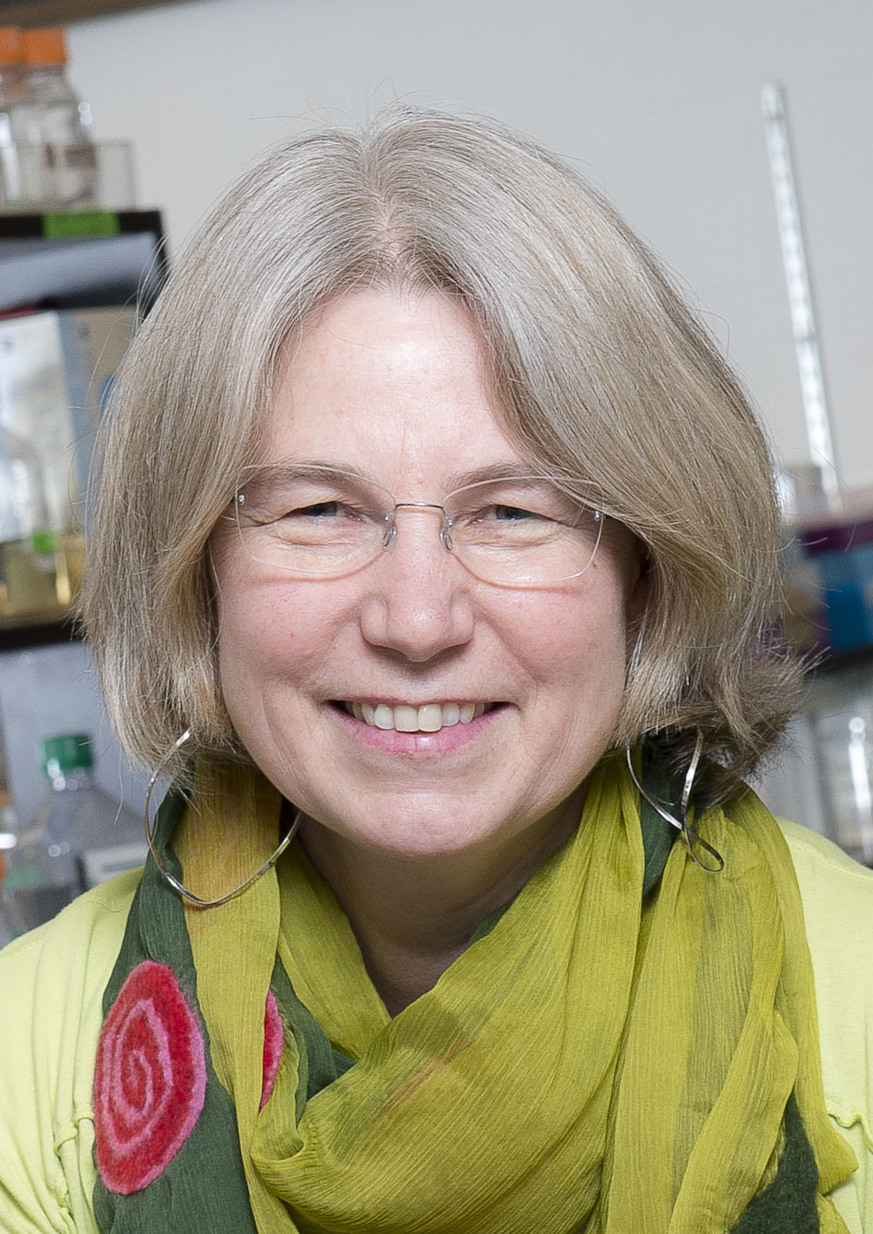
- Lynne Quarmby, in 2013

Personal details
- Party: Green Party of Canada
- Profession: Scientist, activist, politician.

Lynne Quarmby is a Canadian scientist, activist, and politician. She is a professor in the Department of Molecular Biology and Biochemistry at Simon Fraser University in Burnaby, British Columbia. She was a candidate for the Green Party of Canada in Burnaby North—Seymour in the 2015 federal election, and is the Green Party of Canada's Science Policy Critic.

== Research and education ==
Quarmby completed a BSc in Marine Biology and a MSc in Biological Oceanography at the University of British Columbia before moving to the University of Connecticut to complete her PhD in Biochemistry. She worked as a postdoctoral fellow in the lab of Nobel laureate Alfred Gilman at the University of Texas Southwestern Medical Center in Austin, TX, then in the lab of Criss Hartzell at Emory University in Atlanta, GA, where she also held her first faculty position. She moved her lab to Simon Fraser University in 2000.

Quarmby's research has been aimed at understanding the signals and mechanisms of deflagellation, the process by which cells shed their cilia into the environment. Cilia are found on most eukaryotic cells and on most cells in the human body, and defects in a cell's ability to form or maintain its cilia can cause diseases known as ciliopathies, that may include symptoms such as cystic kidney disease, blindness, and obesity. Through her research using the single-celled ciliated green alga Chlamydomonas reinhardtii as a model organism, Quarmby identified members of the NIMA-related family of serine/threonine kinases that function in deflagellation as well as in the assembly and maintenance of cilia. Her group went on to show that NEK8 localizes to cilia, and that mutations in NEK8 interfere with its ciliary localization and cause a severe juvenile cystic kidney disease known as nephronophthisis, underscoring the important link between cilia and cystic kidney disease.

Quarmby's work has been funded by the Natural Sciences and Engineering Research Council of Canada (NSERC), the Canadian Institutes for Health Research (CIHR), and the Kidney Foundation of Canada (KFoC). In 2011 NSERC recognized Quarmby's research program by awarding her a Discovery Accelerator Supplement, a funding program reserved for researchers who show strong potential to become international leaders within their field.

Quarmby is known for outstanding undergraduate teaching, and received a SFU Teaching Excellence Award in 2011.

Quarmby was the co-recipient of the 2015 Nora and Ted Sterling Prize in Support of Controversy.

== Personal life ==
Quarmby lives in Burnaby, British Columbia. She is a painter, and her science-inspired art has been featured in the magazine The Scientist. Her adult son, Jacob Sheehy, lives in Toronto Ontario, where he runs a company called PressureNET.

== Advocacy and politics ==
In May 2010, Quarmby wrote an op-ed in the Ottawa Citizen on gender equality in Canadian science and technology, after the Canada Excellence Research Chairs program did not select any women scientists for the nineteen awards it handed out. This prompted the Vancouver Sun to name her one of 100 BC "Women of Influence" in 2010. She has been an active member of the American Society for Cell Biology's Women in Cell Biology Committee throughout her career.

Quarmby has maintained a blog called The Crux on which she has written on the process of science and the state of science funding in Canada, with guest posts on a variety of science and climate issues. Her work has been featured on the literary blog Numero Cinq.

More recently, Quarmby has been an advocate for action on climate change. In May 2012, she joined the group Voters Taking Action on Climate Change (VTACC) in an anti-coal protest in which they blockaded a coal train carrying coal from Wyoming to Deltaport for export overseas. Thirteen protesters, including Quarmby, were arrested for trespassing under the Railway Safety Act. She was a featured speaker at the People's Climate March in Vancouver, BC.

In November 2014, while Quarmby was involved in the protests of the Trans Mountain Oil Pipeline, she was arrested for civil contempt. The charges were dismissed after it was discovered that she and other protestors had not actually crossed the line prohibited by the court because of a mix-up about GPS coordinates used in the relevant court order.

In December 2014, Quarmby announced that she would be seeking the Green Party of Canada nomination in Burnaby North—Seymour for the upcoming federal election. She was confirmed as the candidate in January 2015, and placed fourth, with five percent of the vote.

2015 Canadian federal election: Burnaby North—Seymour
Party	Candidate	Votes	%	±%	Expenditures
Liberal	Terry Beech	18,938	36.09	+20.37	$116,099.41
New Democratic	Carol Baird Ellan	15,537	29.61	–5.55	$151,963.09
Conservative	Mike Little	14,612	27.84	–16.39	$74,815.44
Green	Lynne Quarmby	2,765	5.27	+1.39	$104,104.37
Libertarian	Chris Tylor	252	0.48	–	none listed
Independent	Helen Hee Soon Chang	207	0.39	–	$3,526.43
Communist	Brent Jantzen	126	0.24	–	none listed
Marxist–Leninist	Brian Sproule	43	0.08	–	none listed
Total valid votes/expense limit		52,480	99.51	–	$206,738.46
Total rejected ballots		260	0.49	–	
Turnout		52,740	70.34	–	
Eligible voters		74,982			
Liberal gain from Conservative		Swing		+18.38	
Source: Elections Canada
