= Kate Young (politician) =

Canadian politician and journalist

Parliamentary Secretary to the Minister of Science
- In office January 30, 2017 – August 15, 2021
- Minister: Kirsty Duncan
- Preceded by: Terry Beech

Parliamentary Secretary to the Minister of Transport
- In office December 2, 2015 – January 27, 2017
- Minister: Marc Garneau
- Preceded by: Jeff Watson
- Succeeded by: Karen McCrimmon

Member of Parliament for London West
- In office October 19, 2015 – September 20, 2021
- Preceded by: Ed Holder
- Succeeded by: Arielle Kayabaga

Personal details
- Born: 1954 or 1955 (age 71–72)
- Party: Liberal
- Profession: public relations manager, former television news anchor

Kate Young (born 1955) is a former Canadian politician and journalist who served as the Member of Parliament (MP) for the riding of London West from 2015 to 2021.

== Background ==
Before entering politics, Young worked as a news anchor of London's CFPL-TV. She is also the former manager of public affairs and community relations for the Thames Valley District School Board.

== Federal politics ==
Young was first elected in the 2015 federal election, defeating Conservative incumbent Ed Holder. She was re-elected in the 2019 federal election.

After her election in 2015, Young was appointed the Parliamentary Secretary to the Minister of Transport, Marc Garneau. In a 2017 cabinet reshuffle, Young was moved to the position of Parliamentary Secretary to the Minister of Science and Sport as well as the Parliamentary Secretary to the Minister of Public Services and Procurement and Accessibility in 2018. Following the 2019 federal election, Young was appointed Parliamentary Secretary to the Minister of Economic Development and Official Languages.

In March 2021, Young announced that she would not be running in the 2021 federal election. She was succeeded by Arielle Kayabaga.

== Electoral record ==
2019 Canadian federal election: London West
Party	Candidate	Votes	%	±%	Expenditures
Liberal	Kate Young	30,622	42.96	-2.85	$115,818.09
Conservative	Liz Snelgrove	19,910	27.93	-7.40	$66,281.02
New Democratic	Shawna Lewkowitz	15,220	21.35	+6.53	$65,779.29
Green	Mary Ann Hodge	3,827	5.37	+2.55	$10,163.23
People's	Mike Mcmullen	1,171	1.64	–	$0.00
Libertarian	Jacques Boudreau	523	0.73	-0.34	none listed
Total valid votes/expense limit		71,273	99.31		
Total rejected ballots		496	0.69	+0.27	
Turnout		71,769	71.49	-1.85	
Eligible voters		100,387			
Liberal hold		Swing		+2.27	
Source: Elections Canada

2015 Canadian federal election
Party	Candidate	Votes	%	±%	Expenditures
Liberal	Kate Young	31,167	45.8	+19.07	–
Conservative	Ed Holder	24,306	35.3	-9.77	–
New Democratic	Matthew Rowlinson	10,087	14.8	-10.62	–
Green	Dimitri Lascaris	1,918	2.8	+0.12	–
Libertarian	Jacques Y. Boudreau	732	1.1	–	–
Communist	Michael Lewis	87	0.1	–	–
Total valid votes/Expense limit		68,027	100.0		$234,017.17
Total rejected ballots		286	–	–	
Turnout		68,313	73.9%	–	
Eligible voters		92,326			
Liberal gain from Conservative		Swing		+14.42	
Source: Elections Canada
