= Minister of Democratic Institutions =

Minister in the Cabinet of Canada

- Government of Canada
- Style: The Honourable
- Member of: Cabinet; Privy Council
- Appointer: Governor General of Canada
- Term length: At His Majesty's pleasure
- Inaugural holder: Jacques Saada
- Formation: December 12, 2003
- Salary: CA$299,900 (2024)
- Website: www.DemocraticInstitutions.gc.ca

The Minister of Democratic Institutions (French: Ministre des Institutions démocratiques) was a Minister of the Crown in the Canadian Cabinet, associated with the Privy Council Office. The position was first created in 2003 as "Minister responsible for Democratic Reform". It was also titled "Minister responsible for Democratic Renewal" and "Minister of State (Democratic Reform)" during various governments. The position was abolished on November 20, 2019 but reestablished on December 20, 2024. It was abolished once again on May 13, 2025.

== History ==
=== Under Martin (2003–2006) ===
The position was created by Prime Minister Paul Martin when he succeeded Jean Chrétien in December 2003 under the title "Minister responsible for Democratic Reform" to address the "democratic deficit", an issue Martin campaigned on when he ran for leader of the Liberal Party of Canada.

The portfolio was initially held by the Government House Leader, Jacques Saada, in Martin's first cabinet. After the 2004 election, the portfolio was given to Mauril Bélanger, who was the deputy government house leader.

When Belinda Stronach crossed the floor from the Conservative Party to Liberals on May 17, 2005, she assumed responsibilities for the portfolio along with the post of Minister of Human Resources and Skills Development. At this point the title was changed from "Democratic Reform" to "Democratic Renewal".

=== Under Harper (2006–2015) ===
Under the premiership of Stephen Harper, the post was first held by his first two House Leaders (Rob Nicholson and Peter Van Loan) as "Leader of the House of Commons and Minister for Democratic Reform". In 2008, the role was taken up by Steven Fletcher as "Minister of State (Democratic Reform)" and the same title was subsequently held by Tim Uppal and Pierre Poilievre.

=== Under Trudeau (2015–2019) ===
In the ministry of Justin Trudeau, who was elected on campaign promises of electoral reform, the portfolio was assigned to Maryam Monsef in November 2015, under the new title "Minister of Democratic Institutions".

In the mandate letter provided to Monsef by Trudeau, she has been instructed to table an action plan outlining proposals to reform the operations of the House of Commons of Canada in order to increase the role of individual Members of Parliament in the House and its committees. Proposals include allowing more free votes, giving committees more authority, increase research budgets, allowing chairs of house committees to be elected rather than appointed by the prime minister, giving MPs a role in choosing which committees they sit on rather than having them assigned by the prime minister or government house leader. She oversaw the formation of the all-party Special Committee on Electoral Reform and appeared as its first witness.

Following criticism of her handling of the portfolio, Monsef was named Minister of Status of Women on February 1, 2017 and Karina Gould was appointed in her place. On February 1, 2017, Gould announced that her mandate would no longer include exploring potential changes to the Canadian electoral system.

On November 20, 2019, as part of Trudeau's Cabinet shuffle following the 2019 Canadian federal election, the Democratic Institutions portfolio was abolished. Joan Bryden of the Canadian Press reported that the position's responsibilities would be transferred to Dominic LeBlanc in his role as President of the Queen's Privy Council for Canada.

== List ==
Key:

Liberal Party of Canada
Conservative Party of Canada

| No. | Portrait | Name | Term of office | | Political party | Ministry |
Minister for Democratic Reform
| 1 | | Jacques Saada | December 12, 2003 | July 20, 2004 | Liberal | 27 (Martin) |
| 2 | | Mauril Bélanger | July 20, 2004 | May 18, 2005 | Liberal | 27 (Martin) |
Minister for Democratic Renewal
| 3 | | Belinda Stronach | May 18, 2005 | February 6, 2006 | Liberal | |
Minister for Democratic Reform
| 4 | | Rob Nicholson | February 6, 2006 | January 4, 2007 | Conservative | 28 (Harper) |
| 5 | | Peter Van Loan | January 4, 2007 | October 30, 2008 | Conservative | 28 (Harper) |
Minister of State (Democratic Reform)
| 6 | | Steven Fletcher | October 30, 2008 | May 18, 2011 | Conservative | |
| 7 | | Tim Uppal | May 18, 2011 | July 15, 2013 | Conservative | |
| 8 | | Pierre Poilievre | July 15, 2013 | November 4, 2015 | Conservative | |
Minister of Democratic Institutions
| 9 | | Maryam Monsef | November 4, 2015 | February 1, 2017 | Liberal | 29 (J. Trudeau) |
| 10 | | Karina Gould | February 1, 2017 | November 20, 2019 | Liberal | 29 (J. Trudeau) |
Responsibilities for Democratic Institutions given to the President of the Privy Council
Minister of Public Safety, Democratic Institutions and Intergovernmental Affairs
| 11 | | Dominic LeBlanc | July 26, 2023 | December 20, 2024 | Liberal | 29 (J. Trudeau) |
Minister of Democratic Institutions
| 12 | | Ruby Sahota | December 20, 2024 | March 14, 2025 | Liberal | 29 (J. Trudeau) |
| 13 | | Arielle Kayabaga | March 14, 2025 | May 13, 2025 | Liberal | 30 (M. Carney) |
Position discontinued since 2025
