= Judd Buchanan =

Canadian politician and businessman (born 1929)

The Honourable J. Judd Buchanan PC OC

President of the Treasury Board
- In office November 24, 1978 – June 3, 1979
- Prime Minister: Pierre Trudeau
- Preceded by: Bob Andras
- Succeeded by: Sinclair Stevens

Minister of Public Works
- In office September 14, 1976 – November 23, 1978
- Prime Minister: Pierre Trudeau
- Preceded by: Charles Drury
- Succeeded by: André Ouellet

Minister of Indian Affairs and Northern Development
- In office August 8, 1974 – September 13, 1976
- Prime Minister: Pierre Trudeau
- Preceded by: Jean Chrétien
- Succeeded by: Warren Allmand

Member of Parliament for London West
- In office June 25, 1968 – August 12, 1980
- Preceded by: Jack Irvine
- Succeeded by: Jack Burghardt

Personal details
- Born: Julian Judd Buchanan; July 25, 1929 (age 97) Edmonton, Alberta, Canada
- Party: Liberal
- Profession: insurance

Julian Judd Buchanan PC OC (born July 25, 1929) is a Canadian former politician and businessman.

After a career in the life insurance industry working for London Life, Buchanan, born in Edmonton, Alberta, was elected to the House of Commons of Canada in the 1968 election as the Liberal Member of Parliament for London West.

He served as a Parliamentary Secretary in the early 1970s, first to the Minister of Indian Affairs and Northern Development, and then to the Finance Minister.

He was appointed to the Cabinet by Prime Minister Pierre Trudeau in 1974 as Minister of Indian Affairs. In 1976, he was moved to the position of Minister of Public Works, and served concurrently as Minister of State for Science and Technology. In 1978, he left these files to become President of the Treasury Board until the defeat of the Trudeau government in the 1979 election.

When the Liberals returned to power in the 1980 election, Buchanan was not returned to Cabinet and he resigned his seat in the House of Commons in August 1980 to return to the private sector.

Following his political career, Buchanan entered the tourism industry, leading Silver Star Mountain Resorts Ltd. In 1995, he helped create the Canadian Tourism Commission which works with government to promote Canada as a tourist destination. He served as its chairman until his retirement in 2002.

In 2000, he was made an Officer of the Order of Canada.

== Archives ==
There is a Judd Buchanan fonds at Library and Archives Canada.
