= Terry Beech =

Canadian politician (born 1981)

The Honourable Terry Beech PC MP
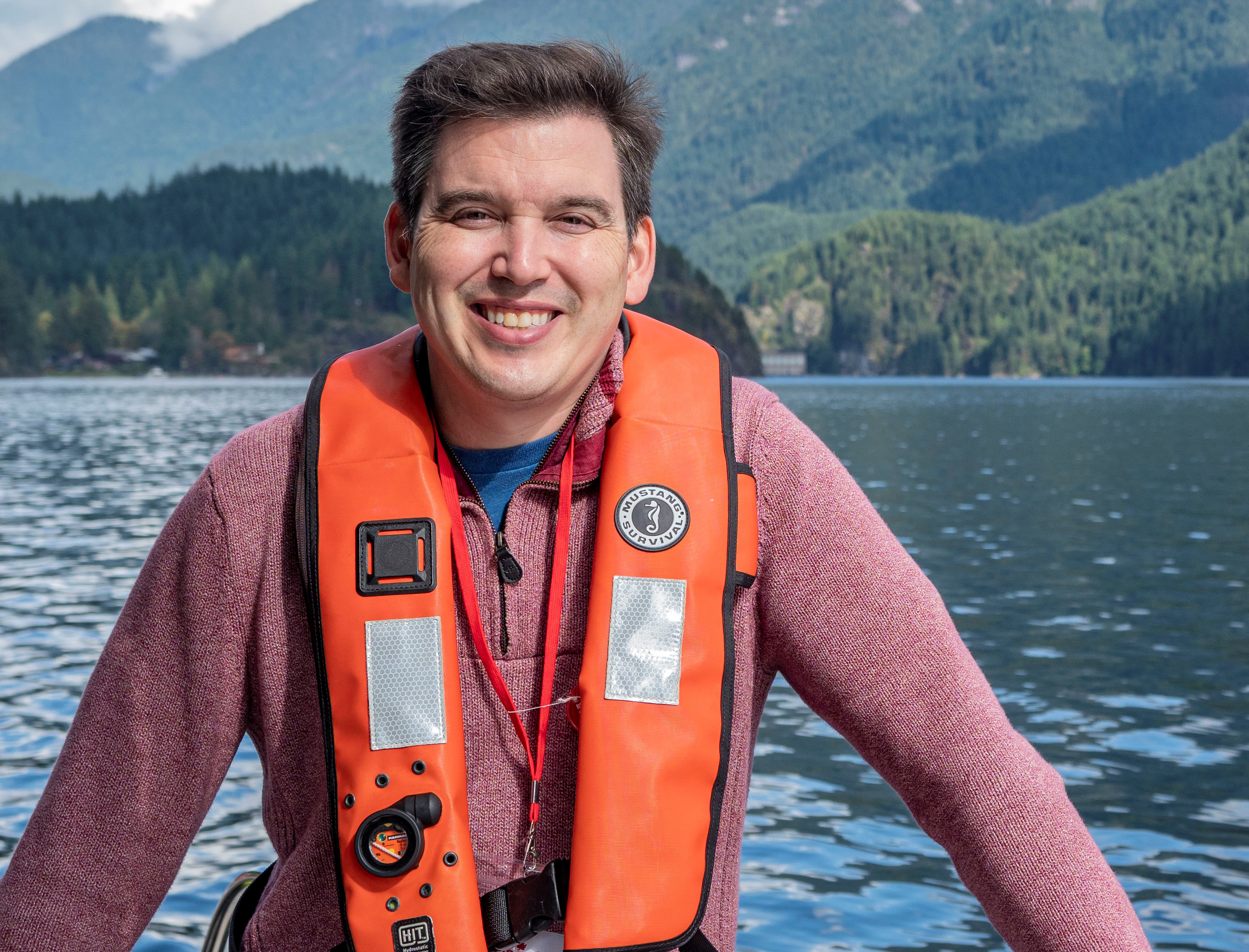
- Beech in 2019

Minister of Citizens' Services
- In office July 26, 2023 – March 14, 2025
- Prime Minister: Justin Trudeau
- Preceded by: Position established
- Succeeded by: Position abolished

Parliamentary Secretary to the Deputy Prime Minister and Minister of Finance
- In office December 3, 2021 – July 26, 2023
- Minister: Chrystia Freeland
- Preceded by: Sean Fraser
- Succeeded by: Rachel Bendayan

Parliamentary Secretary to the Minister of Fisheries, Oceans, and the Canadian Coast Guard
- In office December 12, 2019 – August 15, 2021
- Minister: Bernadette Jordan
- Preceded by: Sean Casey
- Succeeded by: Mike Kelloway
- In office January 28, 2017 – August 31, 2018
- Minister: Dominic LeBlanc
- Preceded by: Serge Cormier
- Succeeded by: Sean Casey

Parliamentary Secretary to the Minister of Economic Development and Official Languages (B.C.)
- In office March 19, 2021 – August 15, 2021
- Minister: Mélanie Joly
- Preceded by: Position established
- Succeeded by: Position abolished

Parliamentary Secretary to the Minister of Transport
- In office August 31, 2018 – September 11, 2019
- Minister: Marc Garneau
- Preceded by: Karen McCrimmon
- Succeeded by: Chris Bittle

Parliamentary Secretary to the Minister of Science
- In office December 2, 2015 – January 28, 2017
- Minister: Kirsty Duncan
- Preceded by: Position established
- Succeeded by: Kate Young

Member of Parliament for Burnaby North—Seymour
- Incumbent
- Assumed office October 19, 2015
- Preceded by: Riding established

Nanaimo City Councillor
- In office December 6, 1999 – December 2, 2002

Personal details
- Born: April 2, 1981 (age 45) Comox, British Columbia, Canada
- Party: Liberal
- Spouse: Ravi Bansal Beech
- Children: 2
- Education: Simon Fraser University (B.B.A.); Oxford University (M.B.A)
- Occupation: Businessman, politician

Terry James Beech PC MP (born April 2, 1981) is a Canadian politician and former businessman. A member of the Liberal Party, he has represented Burnaby North—Seymour in the House of Commons since the 2015 federal election. From 2023 to 2025, Beech served as Minister of Citizens' Services.

In 1999, Beech was elected to the Nanaimo City Council at the age of 18, becoming British Columbia's youngest-ever elected official.

== Early life and municipal politics ==
Beech was born in Comox, British Columbia, and grew up in Victoria.

Beech was elected to Nanaimo City Council in 1999 at age 18, becoming British Columbia's youngest-ever elected official. He served on the council for three years, and did not seek re-election.

== Education and business career ==
Beech earned a certificate in public administration from Capilano University and a bachelor's degree from Simon Fraser University, jointly majoring in business and economics.

After completing his studies at SFU, Beech joined Aquilini Investment Group, where he worked as a director of business development until 2008.

In 2006, Beech and his twin brother, Doug, founded a non-profit organization called Twinbro Local Leaders, aimed at helping students access scholarships.

While working on his MBA at Oxford University through their online offerings, Beech started tech company HiretheWorld. In 2010, HiretheWorld won the BCIC New Ventures Competition, and in 2012, it was named one of BC Business Magazine's top 20 most innovative companies.

Beech has taught entrepreneurship and finance courses as an adjunct professor at Simon Fraser University and the University of British Columbia.

In 2010-11, Beech participated in the Action Canada program, where he co-authored, "Fueling Canada's Economic Success: A National Strategy for High-Growth Entrepreneurship."

In 2013, Beech married Ravi Bansal (now Ravi Bansal Beech). They have two daughters, Nova and Solar.

== Political career ==
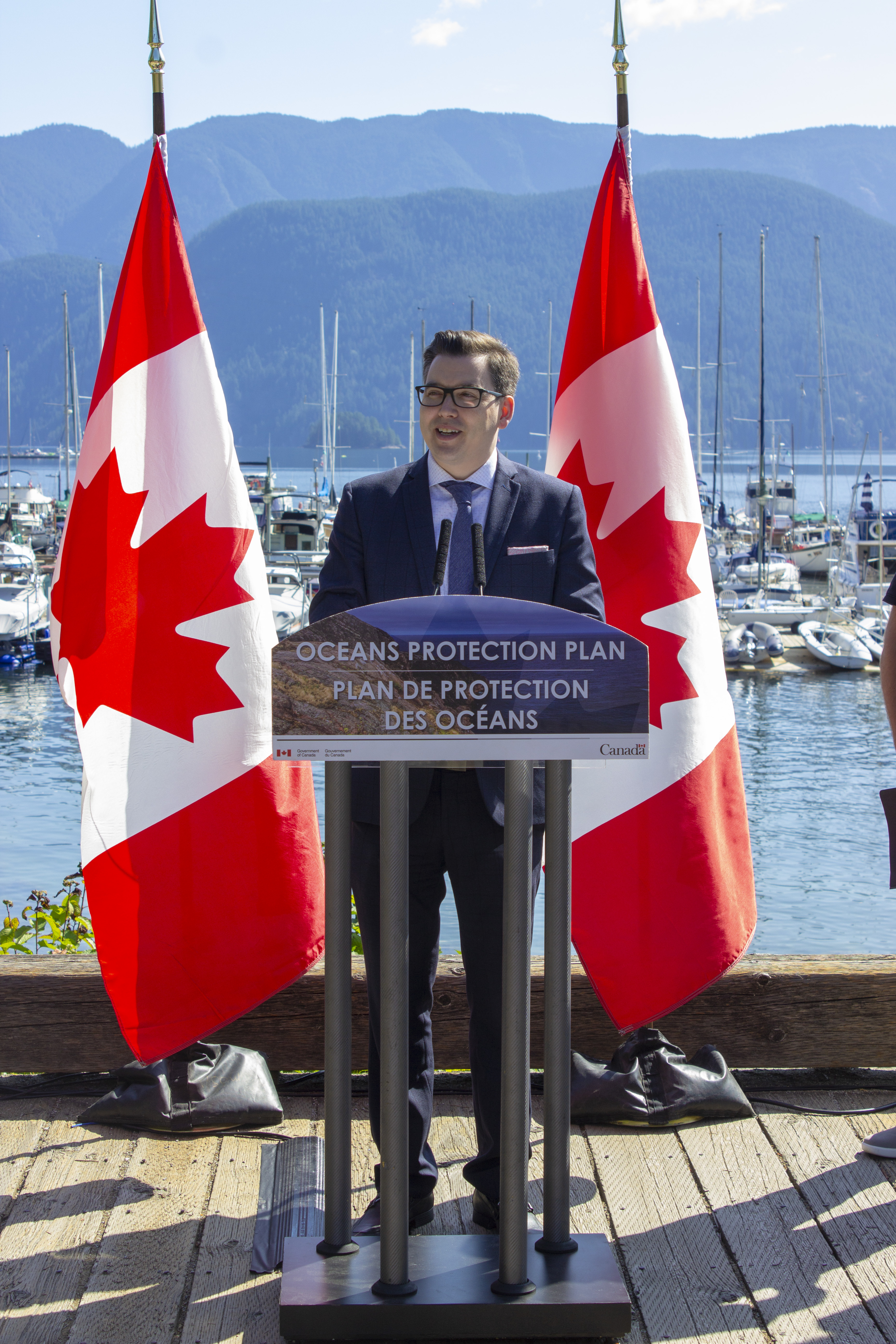
Beech announcing elements of the Oceans Protection Plan

Beech entered federal politics as a member of the Liberal Party, securing the nomination for the newly created riding of Burnaby North—Seymour. In the 2015 federal election he defeated incumbent New Democratic Party candidate Carol Baird Ellan and Conservative Party candidate Mike Little, whose parties had previously won the respective portions of the area from which the Burnaby North—Seymour was created. Beech received 36.1% of the vote, amidst a broader surge of Liberal support in Greater Vancouver during the 2015 federal election.

Following his election, Beech was appointed the Parliamentary Secretary to the Minister of Science. In January 2017, Beech was named Parliamentary Secretary to the Minister of Fisheries, Oceans and the Canadian Coast Guard. Beech held this role until August 2018, when he was named Parliamentary Secretary to the Minister of Transport.

In 2018, Beech was awarded Parliamentarian of the Year for Best Civic Outreach. This award is voted on by all Member of Parliament. Beech attributed his win to his efforts to engage with constituents and by perpetually knocking on doors in his riding.

In the 2019 Canadian federal election, Beech was re-elected, receiving 35.5% of the vote. He defeated New Democratic Party candidate Svend Robinson, who had previously served as MP in Burnaby from 1979 to 2004 and Heather Leung, who was dropped by the Conservative Party after a video of her making homophobic comments surfaced.

On December 12, 2019, Beech was once again named as Parliamentary Secretary to the Minister of Fisheries, Oceans and the Canadian Coast Guard. On February 4, 2020, Beech was selected by fellow caucus members to become the chair of the Federal Liberal Pacific Caucus, composed of Liberal MPs from British Columbia.

In the 2021 Canadian federal election, Beech was re-elected with 39.4% of the vote. On December 3, 2021, Terry Beech was named Parliamentary Secretary to Chrystia Freeland, the Deputy Prime Minister and Minister of Finance.

Beech was appointed as the first Minister of Citizens' Services on July 26, 2023 by Prime Minister Justin Trudeau. The role was intended to address weaknesses in the government's delivery of services to Canadians. One of Beech's key acts, a proposal to create a 30-business-day guarantee for passports to address delays received widespread media coverage. In March 2025, Beech released the first State of Service Report. However, the portfolio was dissolved following Mark Carney's appointment as prime minister in 2025, as part of a broader cabinet restructuring under his leadership, and Beech was not offered another cabinet role.

In the 2025 federal election, Beech was re-elected, receiving 59.1% of the vote, a significant increase from his previous results.

== Awards ==
- Best Politician : Best of Burnaby 2023 and 2024
- Best Constituency MP in Canada: Voted by Hill Times 2023 and 2024
- Hardest Working MP in Canada: Voted by Hill Times 2023
- Best MP to Work For in Canada: Voted by Hill Times 2024
- Parliamentarian of the Year - Civic Outreach: Maclean's Magazine 2018
- Belzberg Blaney Award for Exceptional Service: Action Canada 2024

== Electoral record ==
2025 Canadian federal election: Burnaby North—Seymour
Party	Candidate	Votes	%	±%	Expenditures
Liberal	Terry Beech	37,829	59.05	+18.17	$115,588.32
Conservative	Mauro Francis	21,742	33.94	+7.38	$117,480.54
New Democratic	Michael Charrois	4,121	6.43	–20.09	$20,195.77
People's	Jesse Fulton	366	0.57	–2.08	$370.22
Total valid votes/expense limit		64,058	99.37	–	$134,921.87
Total rejected ballots		407	0.63	+0.08	
Turnout		64,465	71.68	+9.74	
Eligible voters		89,939			
Liberal notional hold		Swing		+12.78	
Source: Elections Canada

2021 Canadian federal election
Party	Candidate	Votes	%	±%
Liberal	Terry Beech	19,445	39.5	+4.0
New Democratic	Jim Hanson	14,318	29.1	-3.2
Conservative	Kelsey Shein	12,535	25.5	+6.0
Green	Peter Dolling	1,516	3.1	-6.5
People's	Brad Nickerson	1,370	2.8	+0.6
Total valid votes		49,184	99.5	
Total rejected ballots		273	0.5	
Turnout		49,457	62.3	
Eligible voters		79,395		
Liberal hold		Swing		+3.6

2019 Canadian federal election: Burnaby North—Seymour
Party	Candidate	Votes	%	±%	Expenditures
Liberal	Terry Beech	17,770	35.50	–0.59	$93,319.78
New Democratic	Svend Robinson	16,185	32.33	+2.73	$97,660.91
Conservative	Heather Leung	9,734	19.45	–8.40	$92,995.62
Green	Amita Kuttner	4,801	9.59	+4.32	$13,982.95
People's	Rocky Dong	1,079	2.16	–	$7,115.13
Independent	Robert Taylor	271	0.54	–	none listed
Libertarian	Lewis C. Dahlby	219	0.44	–0.04	none listed
Total valid votes/expense limit		50,059	99.08	–	$106,341.17
Total rejected ballots		466	0.92	+0.43	
Turnout		50,525	64.80	–5.54	
Eligible voters		77,969			
Liberal hold		Swing		–1.66	
Heather Leung was dropped by the Conservative Party of Canada after past homophobic remarks were made public, but still appeared on the ballot papers.
Source: Elections Canada

2015 Canadian federal election: Burnaby North—Seymour
Party	Candidate	Votes	%	±%	Expenditures
Liberal	Terry Beech	18,938	36.09	+20.37	$116,099.41
New Democratic	Carol Baird Ellan	15,537	29.61	–5.55	$151,963.09
Conservative	Mike Little	14,612	27.84	–16.39	$74,815.44
Green	Lynne Quarmby	2,765	5.27	+1.39	$104,104.37
Libertarian	Chris Tylor	252	0.48	–	none listed
Independent	Helen Hee Soon Chang	207	0.39	–	$3,526.43
Communist	Brent Jantzen	126	0.24	–	none listed
Marxist–Leninist	Brian Sproule	43	0.08	–	none listed
Total valid votes/expense limit		52,480	99.51	–	$206,738.46
Total rejected ballots		260	0.49	–	
Turnout		52,740	70.34	–	
Eligible voters		74,982			
Liberal gain from Conservative		Swing		+18.38	
Source: Elections Canada
