= Cooperatives Secretariat =

Canadian governmental organization

Co-operatives Secretariat
Government secretariat overview
- Formed: 1987
- Preceding Government secretariat: Co-operatives Section of Agriculture Canada
- Dissolved: 2013
- Jurisdiction: Government of Canada
- Headquarters: Ottawa, Ontario
- Parent department: Agriculture Canada (later Agriculture and Agri-Food Canada)

The Co-operatives Secretariat was established within the Government of Canada in 1987 to help the federal government respond more effectively to the concerns and needs of co-operatives. The Secretariat advised the government on policies affecting co-operatives, co-ordinates the implementation of such policies, and encourages use of the co-operative model for the social and economic development of Canada's communities. The Secretariat also provided a link between the co-op sector and the many federal departments and agencies with which they interact.

The Co-operatives Secretariat, housed in Agriculture and Agri-Food Canada was dedicated to economic growth and social development of Canadian society through co-operative enterprise. The mandate of the Cooperatives Secretariat was to:

- ensure that the needs of the co-operative sector are taken into account by the federal government, especially in the development of policies and programs.
- inform the federal government's key players about the role and the potential of co-operatives in the development of Canadian society and its economy.
- foster a beneficial exchange of views among the federal, provincial and territorial governments, co-operatives, academics and other stakeholders engaged in the development of co-operatives.
- facilitate interaction between co-operatives and the federal government.
- provide governments, key economic stakeholders and the general public with information that promotes an accurate understanding of co-operatives and the co-operative model of enterprise.

The Minister of Agriculture and Agri-Food was responsible for the Cooperatives Secretariat.
