= Minister of Citizens' Services =

Canadian cabinet position (2023–2025)

- Ministre des Services aux citoyens
- Incumbent; Vacant since 14 March 2025
- Employment and Social Development Canada
- Style: The Honourable
- Member of: Cabinet; Privy Council
- Appointer: Governor General of Canada on the advice of the prime minister
- Term length: At His Majesty's pleasure
- Inaugural holder: Terry Beech
- Formation: 26 July 2023
- Salary: CA$299,900 (2024)
- Website: esdc-edsc.gc.ca

The minister of citizens' services (French: ministre des services aux citoyens) was a minister of the Crown in the Canadian Cabinet. The position was created on 26 July 2023 and is associated with Employment and Social Development Canada.

== List of ministers ==
Key:

Liberal Party of Canada

No.	Portrait	Name	Term of office		Political party	Ministry
Minister of Citizens' Services
1		Terry Beech	July 26, 2023	March 14, 2025	Liberal	29 (J. Trudeau)
