= Burnaby North—Seymour =

Federal electoral district in British Columbia, Canada

British Columbia electoral district
- Interactive map of riding boundaries from the 2025 federal election

Federal electoral district
- Legislature: House of Commons
MP
Terry Beech
Liberal
- District created: 2013
- First contested: 2015
- Last contested: 2025
- District webpage: profile, map

Demographics
- Population (2011): 102,486
- Electors (2019): 77,301
- Area (km²): 115
- Pop. density (per km²): 891.2
- Census division: Metro Vancouver
- Census subdivision(s): Burnaby (part), North Vancouver (part), Burrard Inlet, Seymour Creek

Burnaby North—Seymour (French: Burnaby-Nord—Seymour) is a federal electoral district in British Columbia. It encompasses a portion of British Columbia previously included in the electoral districts of Burnaby—Douglas and North Vancouver.

Burnaby North—Seymour was created by the 2012 federal electoral boundaries redistribution and was legally defined in the 2013 representation order. It came into effect upon the call of the 42nd Canadian federal election, scheduled for October 2015.

== Demographics ==
Panethnic groups in Burnaby North—Seymour (2011−2021)
Panethnic group	2021		2016		2011	
Panethnic group	Pop.	%	Pop.	%	Pop.	%
European (Note: Statistic includes all persons that did not make up part of a visible minority or an indigenous identity.)	52,725	49.05%	53,835	53.02%	55,425	55.83%
East Asian (Note: Statistic includes total responses of "Chinese", "Korean", and "Japanese" under visible minority section on census.)	31,315	29.13%	29,180	28.74%	28,210	28.41%
South Asian	5,315	4.94%	4,390	4.32%	3,670	3.7%
Southeast Asian (Note: Statistic includes total responses of "Filipino" and "Southeast Asian" under visible minority section on census.)	5,045	4.69%	4,475	4.41%	4,170	4.2%
Middle Eastern (Note: Statistic includes total responses of "West Asian" and "Arab" under visible minority section on census.)	3,745	3.48%	2,525	2.49%	2,070	2.09%
Indigenous	2,695	2.51%	2,500	2.46%	1,785	1.8%
Latin American	2,320	2.16%	1,615	1.59%	1,450	1.46%
African	1,525	1.42%	1,105	1.09%	890	0.9%
Other (Note: Statistic includes total responses of "Visible minority, n.i.e." and "Multiple visible minorities" under visible minority section on census.)	2,795	2.6%	1,920	1.89%	1,610	1.62%
Total responses	107,485	98.8%	101,545	99.08%	99,280	98.66%
Total population	108,794	100%	102,486	100%	100,632	100%
Notes: Totals greater than 100% due to multiple origin responses. Demographics based on 2012 Canadian federal electoral redistribution riding boundaries.

According to the 2016 Canadian census; 2013 representation

Languages: 58.2% English, 10.1% Cantonese, 7.7% Mandarin, 2.9% Italian, 2.6% Korean, 1.8% Persian, 1.7% Spanish, 1.4% Tagalog, 1.2% French
Religions (2011): 44.8% Christian (21.3% Catholic, 4.5% United Church, 4.0% Anglican, 1.5% Christian Orthodox, 1.3% Baptist, 1.2% Lutheran, 1.0% Presbyterian, 10.1% Other), 3.6% Buddhist, 2.9% Muslim, 45.6% No religion
Median income (2015): $34,358
Average income (2015): $49,497
Main industries: Professional, scientific and technical services (11.2% of labour force); Retail trade (10.4%); Educational services (9.4%); Health care and social assistance (9.0%)

== Geography ==
As of the 2012 federal electoral boundaries redistribution, the district includes the portion of the City of Burnaby north of Highway 7, the portion of the District Municipality of North Vancouver east of the Seymour River and the southern section between west of the Seymour River and east of Lynn Creek and the Seymour Creek 2 and Burrard Inlet 3 Indian reserves.

== Members of Parliament ==
This riding has elected the following members of the House of Commons of Canada:

Parliament	Years	Member	Party
Burnaby North—Seymour; Riding created from Burnaby—Douglas and North Vancouver
42nd	2015–2019	Terry Beech	Liberal
43rd	2019–2021	Terry Beech	Liberal
44th	2021–2025	Terry Beech	Liberal
45th	2025–present	Terry Beech	Liberal

== Election results ==
Graph of election results in Burnaby North—Seymour (minor parties that never got 2% of the vote or didn't run consistently are omitted)

=== 2023 representation order ===
2025 Canadian federal election
Party	Candidate	Votes	%	±%	Expenditures
Liberal	Terry Beech	37,829	59.05	+18.17	$115,588.32
Conservative	Mauro Francis	21,742	33.94	+7.38	$117,480.54
New Democratic	Michael Charrois	4,121	6.43	–20.09	$20,195.77
People's	Jesse Fulton	366	0.57	–2.08	$370.22
Total valid votes/expense limit		64,058	99.37	–	$134,921.87
Total rejected ballots		407	0.63	+0.08	
Turnout		64,465	71.68	+9.74	
Eligible voters		89,939			
Liberal notional hold		Swing		+12.78	
Source: Elections Canada

2021 federal election redistributed results
Party	Vote	%
Liberal	22,673	40.88
Conservative	14,732	26.56
New Democratic	14,706	26.52
Green	1,878	3.39
People's	1,472	2.65

=== 2013 representation order ===
2021 Canadian federal election
Party	Candidate	Votes	%	±%	Expenditures
Liberal	Terry Beech	19,445	39.54	+4.04	$109,768.09
New Democratic	Jim Hanson	14,318	29.11	–3.22	$89,537.98
Conservative	Kelsey Shein	12,535	25.49	+6.04	$100,908.61
Green	Peter Dolling	1,516	3.08	–6.51	none listed
People's	Brad Nickerson	1,370	2.79	+0.63	$2,215.88
Total valid votes/expense limit		49,184	99.45	–	$110,377.44
Total rejected ballots		273	0.55	–0.37	
Turnout		49,457	61.94	–2.87	
Eligible voters		79,852			
Liberal hold		Swing		+3.63	
Source: Elections Canada

2019 Canadian federal election
Party	Candidate	Votes	%	±%	Expenditures
Liberal	Terry Beech	17,770	35.50	–0.59	$93,319.78
New Democratic	Svend Robinson	16,185	32.33	+2.73	$97,660.91
Conservative	Heather Leung	9,734	19.45	–8.40	$92,995.62
Green	Amita Kuttner	4,801	9.59	+4.32	$13,982.95
People's	Rocky Dong	1,079	2.16	–	$7,115.13
Independent	Robert Taylor	271	0.54	–	none listed
Libertarian	Lewis C. Dahlby	219	0.44	–0.04	none listed
Total valid votes/expense limit		50,059	99.08	–	$106,341.17
Total rejected ballots		466	0.92	+0.43	
Turnout		50,525	64.80	–5.54	
Eligible voters		77,969			
Liberal hold		Swing		–1.66	
Heather Leung was dropped by the Conservative Party of Canada after past homophobic remarks were made public, but still appeared on the ballot papers.
Source: Elections Canada

2015 Canadian federal election
Party	Candidate	Votes	%	±%	Expenditures
Liberal	Terry Beech	18,938	36.09	+20.37	$116,099.41
New Democratic	Carol Baird Ellan	15,537	29.61	–5.55	$151,963.09
Conservative	Mike Little	14,612	27.84	–16.39	$74,815.44
Green	Lynne Quarmby	2,765	5.27	+1.39	$104,104.37
Libertarian	Chris Tylor	252	0.48	–	none listed
Independent	Helen Hee Soon Chang	207	0.39	–	$3,526.43
Communist	Brent Jantzen	126	0.24	–	none listed
Marxist–Leninist	Brian Sproule	43	0.08	–	none listed
Total valid votes/expense limit		52,480	99.51	–	$206,738.46
Total rejected ballots		260	0.49	–	
Turnout		52,740	70.34	–	
Eligible voters		74,982			
Liberal gain from Conservative		Swing		+18.38	
Source: Elections Canada

2011 federal election redistributed results
Party	Vote	%
Conservative	19,150	44.24
New Democratic	15,219	35.16
Liberal	6,804	15.72
Green	1,679	3.88
Others	437	1.01

== Student vote results ==
Results of the Canadian student vote.

=== 2025 ===
2025 Canadian federal election
Party	Candidate	Votes	%
Liberal	Terry Beech	2,257	52.89
Conservative	Mauro Francis	1,060	24.84
New Democratic	Michael Charrois	720	16.87
People's	Jesse Fulton	230	5.39
Total valid votes		4,267	99.9
Source: Student Vote Canada

== See also ==
- List of Canadian electoral districts
- Historical federal electoral districts of Canada
