= Arielle Kayabaga =

Canadian politician

The Honourable Arielle Kayabaga PC MP
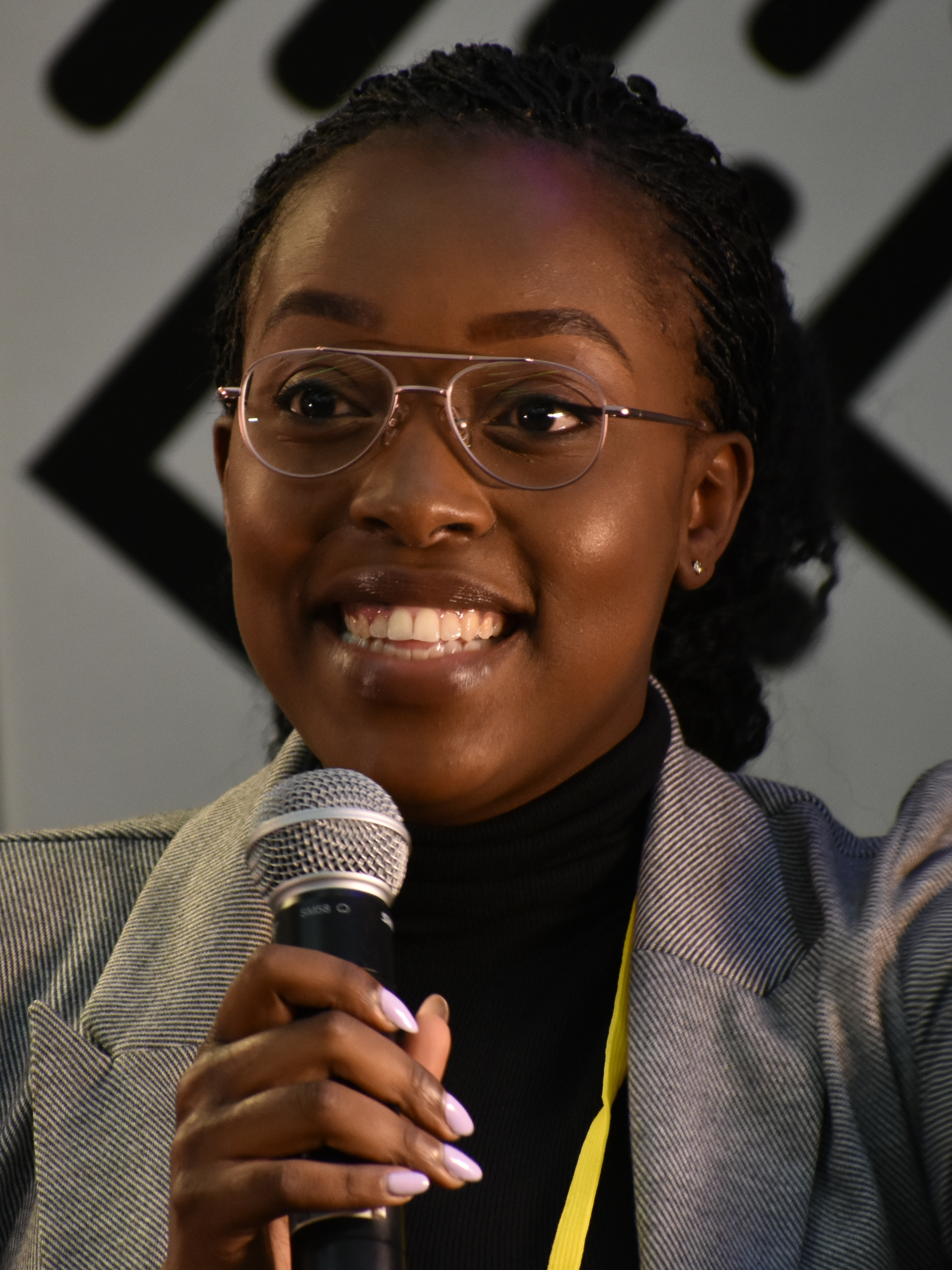
- Kayabaga in 2019

Deputy Leader of the Government in the House of Commons
- Incumbent
- Assumed office June 5, 2025
- Prime Minister: Mark Carney
- Preceded by: Mark Gerretsen

Leader of the Government in the House of Commons
- In office March 14, 2025 – May 13, 2025
- Prime Minister: Mark Carney
- Preceded by: Steven MacKinnon
- Succeeded by: Steven MacKinnon

Minister of Democratic Institutions
- In office March 14, 2025 – May 13, 2025
- Prime Minister: Mark Carney
- Preceded by: Ruby Sahota
- Succeeded by: Position abolished

Member of Parliament for London West
- Incumbent
- Assumed office September 20, 2021
- Preceded by: Kate Young

London City Councillor
- In office December 1, 2018 – September 20, 2021
- Preceded by: Tanya Park
- Succeeded by: John Fyfe-Millar
- Constituency: Ward 13

Personal details
- Born: 1990/1991 (age 35–36) Bujumbura, Burundi
- Party: Liberal
- Children: 1
- Education: Carleton University
- Occupation: Politician, settlement worker

Arielle Kayabaga (born 1990 or 1991) is a Canadian politician who has represented the electoral district of London West as a member of Parliament since 2021. She is currently serving as the Deputy House Leader of the Government in the 45th Canadian Parliament.

== Biography ==
Born in Bujumbura, Burundi, Kayabaga's family moved to Canada when she was 11 as refugees from the Burundian Civil War, living in Montreal for a year before moving to London, Ontario. She earned a bachelor's degree in political science from Carleton University in Ottawa in 2013. Before her election to the London City Council, Kayabaga worked as a settlement worker for newcomers to London and nearby Sarnia, Ontario.

== Political career ==
=== Municipal politics (2018-2021) ===
In 2018, she was elected to the London City Council at age 27, becoming the first black woman to do so in the city's history. As a city councillor, she chaired the Corporate Services Committee and sat on the Standing Committee on Municipal Finance,

=== Federal politics (2021–present) ===
Ahead of the 2021 Canadian federal election, she announced her intention to run for the federal House of Commons, winning the Liberal nomination for the riding of London West three days before the start of the electoral campaign. She won the seat with 36.8% of the vote, replacing outgoing Liberal MP Kate Young. She is the first Franco-Ontarian to serve as MP for London West.

In 2023, she passed a private member's motion, M-59, which amended the federal framework on housing for individuals with non-visible disabilities.

On March 14, 2025, she was appointed Government House Leader and Minister of Democratic Institutions as part of Mark Carney's cabinet. After being reelected in the 2025 federal election on April 28, Kayabaga was not chosen to remain in cabinet in the subsequent shuffle on May 13.

On June 5, 2025, Prime Minister Mark Carney appointed Kayabaga as the Deputy House Leader of the Government.

== Electoral record ==
2025 Canadian federal election: London West
| Party | Candidate | Votes | % | ±% | Expenditures |
|---|---|---|---|---|---|
| Liberal | Arielle Kayabaga | 35,309 | 56.22 | +19.35 | $129,957.46 |
| Conservative | Adam Benni | 23,239 | 37.00 | +2.85 | $112,769.80 |
| New Democratic | Shinade Allder | 3,463 | 5.51 | –17.37 | $39,732.10 |
| Green | Jeff Vanderzwet | 427 | 0.68 | N/A | $0.00 |
| Canadian Future | Russell Benner | 185 | 0.29 | N/A | $22.83 |
| United | Christine Oliver | 185 | 0.29 | N/A | $1,683.05 |
| Total valid votes/expense limit | | 63,205 | 99.38 | – | $132,273.29 |
| Total rejected ballots | | 397 | 0.62 | | |
| Turnout | | 63,602 | 73.25 | | |
| Eligible voters | | 86,827 | | | |
| Liberal notional hold | | Swing | | +8.30 | |
Source: CBC, Elections Canada

2021 Canadian federal election: London West
| Party | Candidate | Votes | % | ±% | Expenditures |
|---|---|---|---|---|---|
| Liberal | Arielle Kayabaga | 25,308 | 36.88 | -6.08 | $91,373.14 |
| Conservative | Rob Flack | 22,273 | 32.46 | +4.53 | $114,644.53 |
| New Democratic | Shawna Lewkowitz | 16,858 | 24.57 | +3.22 | $72,003.76 |
| People's | Mike McMullen | 3,409 | 4.97 | +3.33 | $17,546.25 |
| Libertarian | Jacques Y. Boudreau | 773 | 1.13 | +0.4 | $0.00 |
| Total valid votes/expense limit | | 68,621 | 99.25 | | |
| Total rejected ballots | | 517 | 0.74 | +0.27 | |
| Turnout | | 69,138 | 68.49 | -3.00 | |
| Eligible voters | | 100,947 | | | |
| Liberal hold | | Swing | | -5.31 | |
Source: Elections Canada
