= London West (federal electoral district) =

Federal electoral district in Ontario, Canada

Coordinates: 43.0°N 81.3°W

Ontario electoral district
- Interactive map of riding boundaries from the 2025 federal election

Federal electoral district
- Legislature: House of Commons
MP
Arielle Kayabaga
Liberal
- District created: 1966
- First contested: 1968
- Last contested: 2021
- District webpage: profile, map

Demographics
- Population (2011): 119,090
- Electors (2015): 91,601
- Area (km²): 82
- Pop. density (per km²): 1,452.3
- Census division: Middlesex
- Census subdivision: London (part)

London West (French: London-Ouest) is a federal electoral district in London, Ontario, Canada, that has been represented in the House of Commons of Canada since 1968.

== Geography ==
The district includes the northwest part of the City of London.

In 2003, it was defined to consist of the part of the city lying north and west of a line drawn from the western limit of the city along Dingman Creek, Southdale Road West, Wharncliffe Road South, Commissioners Road East, the Canadian National Railway, the Thames River, Wharncliffe Road North, Oxford Street West and Wonderland Road North.

== History ==
The electoral district was created in 1966 from London, Middlesex East, and from Middlesex West.

It initially consisted of the part of the City of London west of a line drawn from north to south along Adelaide Street, Dundas Street, Wellington Street and Wellington Road.

In 1976, it was redefined to consist of the part of the city west of a line drawn from south to north along Southdale Road, Wellington Road, the Thames River and the North Thames River, Dundas Street, Colborne Street, Huron Street and Richmond Street.

In 1987, it was redefined to consist of the part of the city lying north and west of a line drawn from the southern limit of the city along Wharncliffe Road South, Commissioners Road East, Wellington Road, the Thames River, the North Thames River, the Medway River, Western Road and Richmond Street.

In 1996, it was redefined to consist of the part of the city lying north and west of a line drawn from the western limit of the city along Dingman Creek, Southdale Road West, Wharncliffe Road South, Commissioners Road East, the London and Port Stanley Electric Railway, the Thames River, Wharncliffe Road, Oxford Street, Wonderland Road North and Hutton Road.

In 2003, it was given its current boundaries as described above.

This riding lost territory to London North Centre during the 2012 electoral redistribution.

Following the 2022 Canadian federal electoral redistribution, the riding lost the neighbourhoods of South London and Highland north of Commissioners Road to the new riding of London Centre, and lost the area north of Fanshawe Park Road to Middlesex—London.

== Demographics ==
According to the 2021 Canadian census

Ethnic groups: 70.4% White, 3.2% Latin American, 5.6% Arab, 5.8% South Asian, 3.7% Black, 3.1% Chinese, 3.1% Indigenous, 1.3% West Asian, 1.1% Korean
Languages: 72.7% English, 4.2% Arabic, 3.0% Spanish, 1.8% Mandarin, 1.1% French, 1.0% Portuguese
Religions: 51.3% Christian (22.3% Catholic, 5.4% United Church, 5.1% Anglican, 2.0% Christian Orthodox, 1.7% Presbyterian, 1.4% Baptist, 1.1% Pentecostal, 12.3% Other), 9.3% Muslim, 1.6% Hindu, 35.3% None
Median income: $42,800 (2020)

Average income: $55,300 (2020)

== Members of Parliament ==
This riding has elected the following members of Parliament:

Parliament	Years	Member	Party
London West; Riding created from London, Middlesex East and Middlesex West
28th	1968–1972	Judd Buchanan	Liberal
29th	1972–1974	Judd Buchanan	Liberal
30th	1974–1979	Judd Buchanan	Liberal
31st	1979–1980	Judd Buchanan	Liberal
32nd	1980–1980	Judd Buchanan	Liberal
32nd	1981–1984	Jack Burghardt	Liberal
33rd	1984–1988	Tom Hockin	Progressive Conservative
34th	1988–1993	Tom Hockin	Progressive Conservative
35th	1993–1997	Sue Barnes	Liberal
36th	1997–2000	Sue Barnes	Liberal
37th	2000–2004	Sue Barnes	Liberal
38th	2004–2006	Sue Barnes	Liberal
39th	2006–2008	Sue Barnes	Liberal
40th	2008–2011	Ed Holder	Conservative
41st	2011–2015	Ed Holder	Conservative
42nd	2015–2019	Kate Young	Liberal
43rd	2019–2021	Kate Young	Liberal
44th	2021–2025	Arielle Kayabaga	Liberal
45th	2025–present	Arielle Kayabaga	Liberal

== Election results ==
Graph of election results in London West (parties that never received 2% of the vote are omitted) View source data.

2025 Canadian federal election
Party	Candidate	Votes	%	±%	Expenditures
Liberal	Arielle Kayabaga	34,884	56.30	+19.43	
Conservative	Adam Benni	22,920	36.99	+2.84	
New Democratic	Shinade Allder	3,370	5.44	–17.44	
Green	Jeff Vanderzwet	418	0.67	N/A	
Canadian Future	Russell Benner	183	0.30	N/A	
United	Christine Oliver	192	0.29	N/A	
Total valid votes/expense limit					
Total rejected ballots					
Turnout		61,957	71.82		
Eligible voters		86,269			
Liberal notional hold		Swing		+8.30	
Source: CBC, Elections Canada

2021 federal election redistributed results
Party	Vote	%
Liberal	20,781	36.87
Conservative	19,247	34.15
New Democratic	12,895	22.88
People's	2,814	4.99
Others	625	1.11

2021 Canadian federal election
Party	Candidate	Votes	%	±%	Expenditures
Liberal	Arielle Kayabaga	25,308	36.88	-6.08	$91,373.14
Conservative	Rob Flack	22,273	32.46	+4.53	$114,644.53
New Democratic	Shawna Lewkowitz	16,858	24.57	+3.22	$72,003.76
People's	Mike McMullen	3,409	4.97	+3.33	$17,546.25
Libertarian	Jacques Y. Boudreau	773	1.13	+0.4	$0.00
Total valid votes/expense limit		68,621	99.25		
Total rejected ballots		517	0.74	+0.27	
Turnout		69,138	68.49	-3.00	
Eligible voters		100,947			
Liberal hold		Swing		-5.31	
Source: Elections Canada

2019 Canadian federal election
Party	Candidate	Votes	%	±%	Expenditures
Liberal	Kate Young	30,622	42.96	-2.85	$115,818.09
Conservative	Liz Snelgrove	19,910	27.93	-7.40	$66,281.02
New Democratic	Shawna Lewkowitz	15,220	21.35	+6.53	$65,779.29
Green	Mary Ann Hodge	3,827	5.37	+2.55	$10,163.23
People's	Mike Mcmullen	1,171	1.64	–	$0.00
Libertarian	Jacques Boudreau	523	0.73	-0.34	none listed
Total valid votes/expense limit		71,273	99.31		
Total rejected ballots		496	0.69	+0.27	
Turnout		71,769	71.49	-1.85	
Eligible voters		100,387			
Liberal hold		Swing		+2.27	
Source: Elections Canada

2015 Canadian federal election
Party	Candidate	Votes	%	±%	Expenditures
Liberal	Kate Young	31,167	45.82	+19.09	$126,846.59
Conservative	Ed Holder	24,036	35.33	-9.74	$193,780.18
New Democratic	Matthew Rowlinson	10,087	14.83	-10.59	$56,369.31
Green	Dimitri Lascaris	1,918	2.82	+0.14	$31,948.87
Libertarian	Jacques Y. Boudreau	732	1.08	–	–
Communist	Michael Lewis	87	0.13	–	–
Total valid votes/Expense limit		68,027	99.58		$234,461.82
Total rejected ballots		286	0.42	–	
Turnout		68,313	73.35	–	
Eligible voters		93,138			
Liberal gain from Conservative		Swing		+14.41	
Source: Elections Canada

2011 federal election redistributed results
Party	Vote	%
Conservative	26,296	45.07
Liberal	15,595	26.73
New Democratic	14,830	25.42
Green	1,563	2.68
Others	59	0.10

2011 Canadian federal election
Party	Candidate	Votes	%	±%	Expenditures
Conservative	Ed Holder	27,675	44.49	+5.40	–
Liberal	Doug Ferguson	16,652	26.77	-8.64	–
New Democratic	Peter Ferguson	16,109	25.90	+11.33	–
Green	Brad Arthur Corbett	1,703	2.74	-7.01	–
United	Rod Morley	65	0.10	–	–
Total valid votes		62,204	100.00	–	
Total rejected ballots		273	0.44	+0.08	–
Turnout		62,477	67.49	+4.35	
Eligible voters		92,572	–	–	

2008 Canadian federal election
Party	Candidate	Votes	%	±%	Expenditures
Conservative	Ed Holder	22,556	39.09	+3.4	$90,739
Liberal	Sue Barnes	20,435	35.41	-2.5	$72,288
New Democratic	Peter Lawrence Ferguson	8,409	14.57	-6.9	$18,620
Green	Monica Jarabek	5,601	9.75	+4.9	$15,205
Progressive Canadian	Steve Hunter	414	0.71	+0.3	$750
Christian Heritage	Leslie Bartley	253	0.43	–	$39
Total valid votes/Expense limit		57,697	100.00	$92,384	
Total rejected ballots		211	0.36		
Turnout		57,908	63.14		

2006 Canadian federal election
Party	Candidate	Votes	%	±%
Liberal	Sue Barnes	23,019	37.9	-7.6
Conservative	Al Gretzky	21,690	35.7	+4.2
New Democratic	Gina Barber	13,056	21.5	+4.2
Green	Monica Jarabek	2,900	4.8	+0.1
Progressive Canadian	Steve Hunter	328	0.5	-0.4
Marxist–Leninist	Margaret Villamizer	59	0.1	0.0
Total valid votes		60,724	100.0	

2004 Canadian federal election
Party	Candidate	Votes	%	±%
Liberal	Sue Barnes	25,061	45.5	-3.9
Conservative	Mike Menear	17,335	31.5	-9.9
New Democratic	Gina Barber	9,522	17.3	+9.8
Green	Rebecca Bromwich	2,611	4.7	+3.5
Progressive Canadian	Steve Hunter	511	0.9	
Marxist–Leninist	Margaret Villamizar	67	0.1	-0.1
Total valid votes		55,107	100.0	

2000 Canadian federal election
Party	Candidate	Votes	%	±%
Liberal	Sue Barnes	23,794	49.4	+0.8
Alliance	Salim Mansur	10,162	21.1	+3.7
Progressive Conservative	Jeff Lang	9,788	20.3	-1.2
New Democratic	George Goodlet	3,596	7.5	-2.9
Green	Jeremy Price	614	1.3	+0.3
Canadian Action	Richard Goos	162	0.3	
Marxist–Leninist	Margaret Villamizar	80	0.2	0.0
Total valid votes		48,196	100.0	

1997 Canadian federal election
Party	Candidate	Votes	%	±%
Liberal	Sue Barnes	24,710	48.6	+0.2
Progressive Conservative	Frank Mazzilli	10,958	21.5	-2.0
Reform	Terry Biggs	8,839	17.4	-2.7
New Democratic	Sandra McNee	5,291	10.4	+6.4
Christian Heritage	Stan Winters	515	1.0	+0.5
Green	Rachelle Small	497	1.0	+0.4
Marxist–Leninist	Margaret Villamizar	83	0.2	
Total valid votes		50,893	100.0	

1993 Canadian federal election
Party	Candidate	Votes	%	±%
Liberal	Sue Barnes	31,084	48.3	+10.8
Progressive Conservative	Tom Hockin	15,169	23.6	-22.1
Reform	Todd Christensen	12,900	20.1	
New Democratic	Margaret Hoff	2,551	4.0	-12.1
National	Michael van Holst	1,219	1.9	
Green	Heidi Strasser	401	0.6	
Natural Law	Mark Hawkins	381	0.6	
Christian Heritage	Ken DeVries	308	0.5	
Canada Party	Tom Ha	178	0.3	
Independent	Ivan W. Kasiurak	111	0.2	
Abolitionist	Judith Foster	33	0.1	
Total valid votes		64,335	100.0	

1988 Canadian federal election
Party	Candidate	Votes	%	±%
Progressive Conservative	Tom Hockin	28,392	45.7	-5.7
Liberal	Mary Copps-Sutherland	23,321	37.5	+5.2
New Democratic	Bruce Lundgren	10,007	16.1	-0.2
Libertarian	Hubert Ramolla	435	0.7	
Total valid votes		62,155	100.0	

1984 Canadian federal election
Party	Candidate	Votes	%	±%
Progressive Conservative	Tom Hockin	34,517	51.4	+6.6
Liberal	Jack Burghardt	21,701	32.3	-14.4
New Democratic	Bruce Lundgren	10,911	16.3	+8.2
Total valid votes		67,129	100.0	

By-election on 13 April 1981
Party	Candidate	Votes	%	±%
Liberal	Jack Burghardt	21,952	46.8	+2.6
Progressive Conservative	Tom Hockin	21,022	44.8	+4.0
New Democratic	Bruce Lundgren	3,802	8.1	-6.3
Independent	Denise Sweeney Seguin	87	0.2	
Independent	Roger J. Smith	44	0.1	
Independent	John Turmel	37	0.1	
Total valid votes		46,944	100.0	

1980 Canadian federal election
Party	Candidate	Votes	%	±%
Liberal	Judd Buchanan	27,118	44.2	+1.8
Progressive Conservative	Don McDougall	25,031	40.8	-0.7
New Democratic	Paddy Musson	8,817	14.4	-1.4
Rhinoceros	Stewart Showers	224	0.4	
Libertarian	Richard Keys	159	0.3	-0.1
Marxist–Leninist	John Stafford	35	0.1	0.0
Total valid votes		61,384	100.0	

1979 Canadian federal election
Party	Candidate	Votes	%	±%
Liberal	Judd Buchanan	25,258	42.4	-13.7
Progressive Conservative	John McGarry	24,746	41.5	+10.3
New Democratic	Paddy Musson	9,378	15.7	+3.3
Libertarian	Richard Keys	187	0.3	
Marxist–Leninist	John Stafford	44	0.1	
Total valid votes		59,613	100.0	

1974 Canadian federal election
Party	Candidate	Votes	%	±%
Liberal	Judd Buchanan	32,188	56.08	+6.12
Progressive Conservative	Peter White	17,893	31.18	-3.75
New Democratic	John Crook	7,142	12.44	-2.67
Independent	Vay Jonynas	170	0.30	
Total valid votes		57,393	100.00	

1972 Canadian federal election
Party	Candidate	Votes	%	±%
Liberal	Judd Buchanan	29,474	49.96	+0.63
Progressive Conservative	John F. Bennett	20,611	34.93	-6.92
New Democratic	Jim Bolton	8,914	15.11	+6.29
Total valid votes		58,999	100.00	

1968 Canadian federal election
Party	Candidate	Votes	%
Liberal	Judd Buchanan	21,764	49.33
Progressive Conservative	Jack Irvine	18,462	41.85
New Democratic	Gwen Pemberton	3,891	8.82
Total valid votes		44,117	100.00

== See also ==
- List of Canadian electoral districts
- Historical federal electoral districts of Canada

== Sources ==
- Federal riding history from the Library of Parliament
- 2011 Results from Elections Canada
- Campaign expense data from Elections Canada
