= Tom Hockin =

Canadian politician

Thomas A. Hockin, PC (born March 5, 1938) is a Canadian academic, businessman and former politician.

Hockin was born and went to public school in London, Ontario. He graduated from the University of Western Ontario with a degree in business, and later attended Harvard University, where he graduated with a master's degree in public administration and Ph.D. in political science.

Hockin subsequently joined the political science faculty at fledgling York University, where he rose to full professor teaching Canadian politics. In later years, prior to 1981, he was also head master at St. Andrew's College in Aurora, Ontario. and had a business affiliation with Sotheby's auction house. In addition, he was a member of the Ontario Police Commission.

Hockin, who has authored over 30 books, chapters and articles, produced two leading textbooks on Canadian politics in the 1970s: two editions of Apex of Power, first published in 1971, describing the position of the Prime Minister and central agencies in Canadian government, and Government in Canada, published in 1976, an historical overview and political analysis of national political institutions in Canada. Hockin was also a specialist in Canadian parliamentary organization and Canadian foreign policy.

Hockin was the unsuccessful Progressive Conservative candidate in the 1981 by-election held in London West, coming in 900 votes behind the Liberal candidate. Thereafter, he taught in the business school at the University of Western Ontario and moved his residence to London.

He won the riding in the 1984 general election that brought the Tories to power under Brian Mulroney. He was a government backbencher for two years before being appointed to Cabinet as minister of state for finance. He served in that position until 1989 when he became minister of state for small business and tourism. In January 1993, Hockin became a full minister as minister for science, although he retained his other portfolio.

When Kim Campbell succeeded Mulroney as PC leader and prime minister in June 1993, she promoted Hockin to minister of international trade. The promotion was short-lived as both he and the Campbell government were defeated in the fall general election. Hockin was defeated by Liberal Sue Barnes. After leaving politics, Hockin was active as a lobbyist for the mutual fund industry as president and chief executive officer of the Investment Funds Institute of Canada.

On November 30, 2009, federal Finance Minister Jim Flaherty nominated Hockin to become the executive director of the International Monetary Fund (IMF) representing Canada, Ireland and the Caribbean. Hockin succeeded Michael Horgan, who became the deputy minister of finance.
