= Deputy Leader of the Government in the House of Commons (Canada) =

Deputy Leader of the Government in the House of Commons of Canada
- (Leader adjoint du gouvernement à la Chambre des communes)
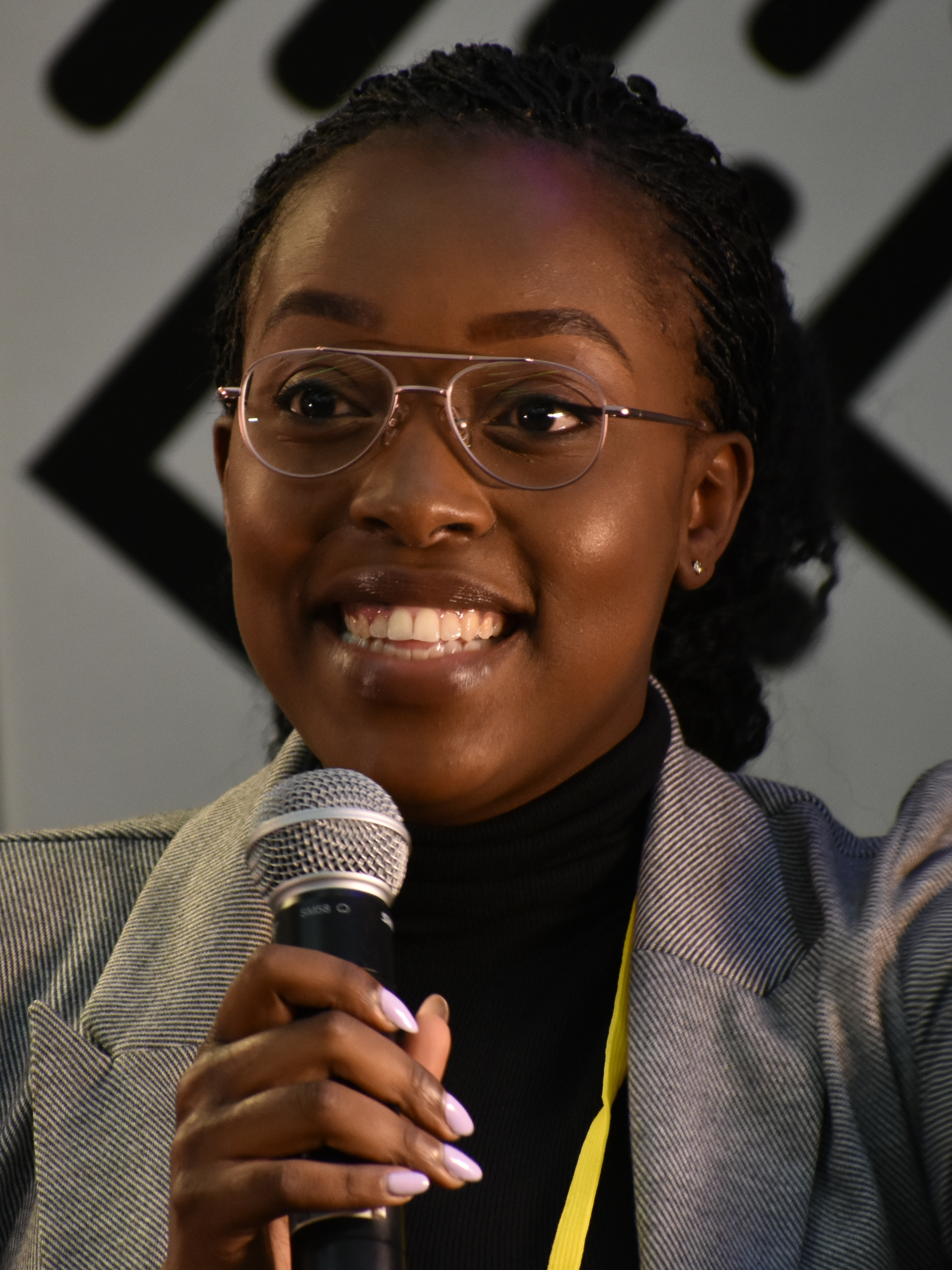
- Incumbent; Arielle Kayabaga since June 5, 2025
- Member of: House of Commons
- Salary: $222,700 (2024)

The Deputy Leader of the Government in the House of Commons (French: Leader adjointe du gouvernement à la Chambre des communes) assists the Government House Leader and coordinates with the Chief Government Whip. The position is currently held by Arielle Kayabaga.

== List of Deputy House Leaders ==
Name	Duration	Party
Alfonso Gagliano	1994–2002	Liberal
Paul DeVillers	2002–2003	Liberal
Mauril Bélanger	2003–2006	Liberal
Scott Reid	2006–2015	Conservative
Arnold Chan	2015–2017	Liberal
Chris Bittle	2017–2019	Liberal
Kirsty Duncan	2019–2022	Liberal
Sherry Romanado	2022–2023	Liberal
Mark Gerretsen	2023–2025	Liberal
Arielle Kayabaga	2025-Present	Liberal
