= Mike Little (politician) =

Canadian politician

Mayor of the District of North Vancouver
- Incumbent
- Assumed office November 6, 2018
- Preceded by: Richard Walton

Personal details
- Born: April 29, 1976 (age 50)
- Party: BC Liberal (2018); Conservative
- Spouse: Kellyanne
- Children: 4
- Profession: International Shipping

Michael David Little (born April 29, 1976) is a Canadian politician. He has served as the mayor of the District of North Vancouver, British Columbia, since 2018.

== Early life ==
Little grew up in the Seymour neighbourhood in the east end of the district. He attended Capilano University and graduated with a degree in political science from Trinity Western University. In 1999 he began working for Westran Intermodal, a transportation and reloading company owned by his family. Politically, he volunteered for Reform Party MP Ted White, and later worked as a legislative assistant for Conservative MP Mark Warawa.

Little first ran for District Council in 2002 at the age of 26. He ended up winning 3,432 votes, over 3,000 votes behind the sixth place finisher who won the last council spot.

== Council career ==
Little served on North Vancouver's District Council from 2005 to 2014. He was first elected in the 2005 municipal election, running on a platform of shifting "the tax burden off residential taxpayers by generating new sources of revenue" and promised to explore more shared services with neighbouring municipalities. On election day, he won 5,453 votes, placing fifth on the six-seat council. He was re-elected in the 2008 municipal elections with 6,506 votes in third place, and in the 2011 municipal elections with 7,401 votes in second place. While on council, he served as a director with the Greater Vancouver Labour Relations Bureau, where he oversaw public negotiations with municipal employees. He was also a board member of the Metro Vancouver Environment and Parks Board.

Little decided not to run for re-election in the 2014 municipal election because he had been nominated as the Conservative Party of Canada candidate in the 2015 Canadian federal election in Burnaby North—Seymour. During the federal election campaign, he "went invisible", avoiding all-candidates' meetings and media interviews, something that was not rare for Conservative candidates during the election, who stated a preference for door-to-door canvassing. On election day, he placed third with 14,612 votes, over 4,000 behind the winning candidate, Terry Beech of the Liberals.

== Mayoral career ==
Following the decision of mayor Richard Walton to not run for re-election, Little announced his intention to run for mayor in the 2018 mayoral election in May of that year. Upon entering the race, he stated he planned on making housing and transportation his main issues. On election day, Little beat public health worker Ash Amlani, the candidate for the Building Bridges party by over 8,000 votes. Upon his election, Little promised he was "going to deal with traffic, affordability and density." He was concerned with affordable rentals being ton down and replaced with condos.

Little was re-elected in the 2022 mayoral election, by a razor-thin 322 votes, defeating councillor Mathew Bond. Little campaigned on his "deep engagement in the community" and his work on the TransLink Mayors' Council on Regional Transportation.

In 2026, Little along with Linda Buchanan, the mayor of the City of North Vancouver called for a public inquiry into the cost of a new wastewater treatment facility, the North Shore Wastewater Treatment Plant, whose projected cost had escalated from $700 million to $3.86 billion.

== Personal life ==
Little has lived in North Vancouver for his entire life. He is married and has four children. He lives in the Seymour area.
