= 1993 Canadian federal election =

- October 25, 1993

295 seats in the House of Commons 148 seats needed for a majority
- Opinion polls
- Turnout: 69.6% (▼5.7 pp)
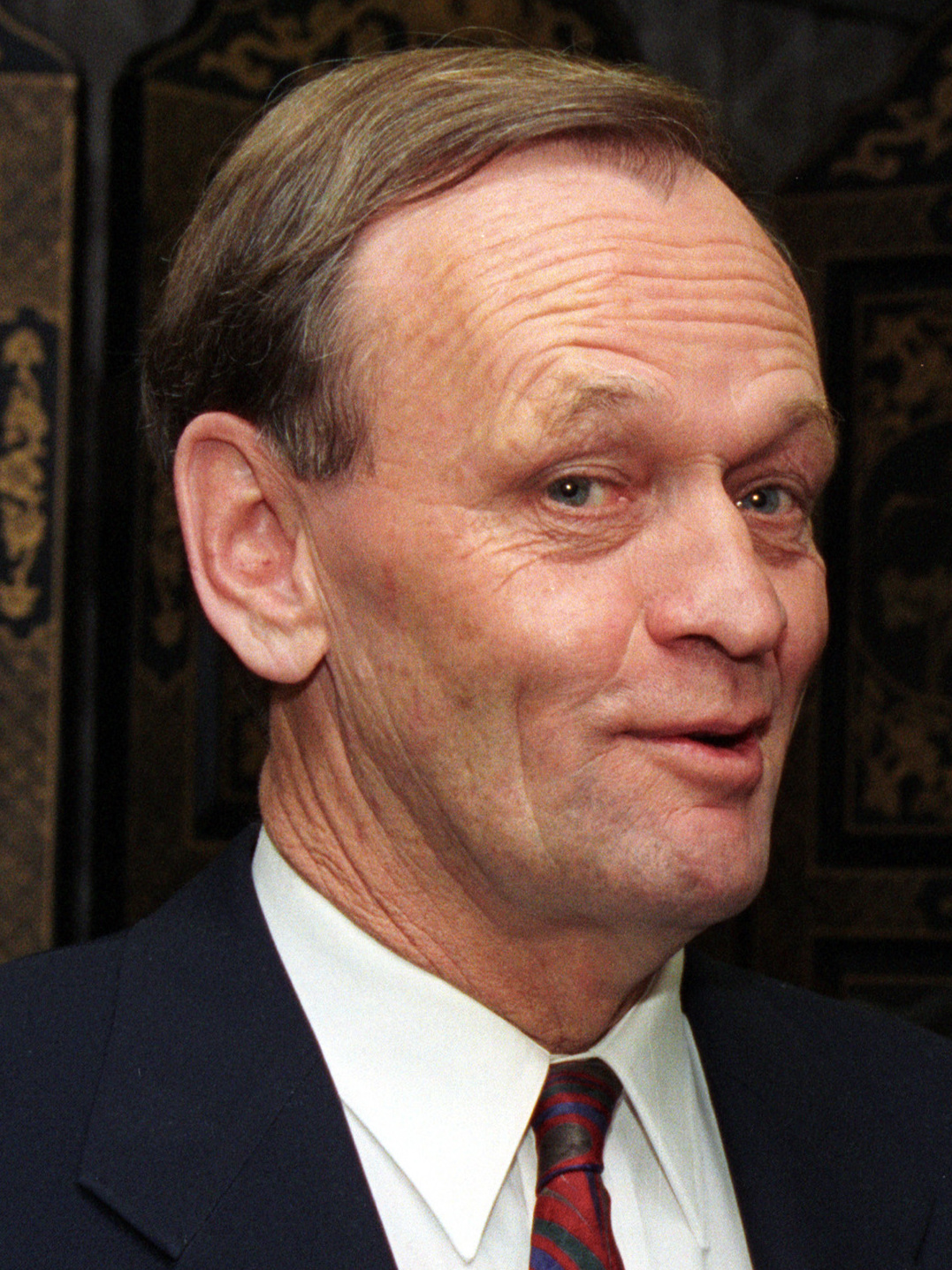

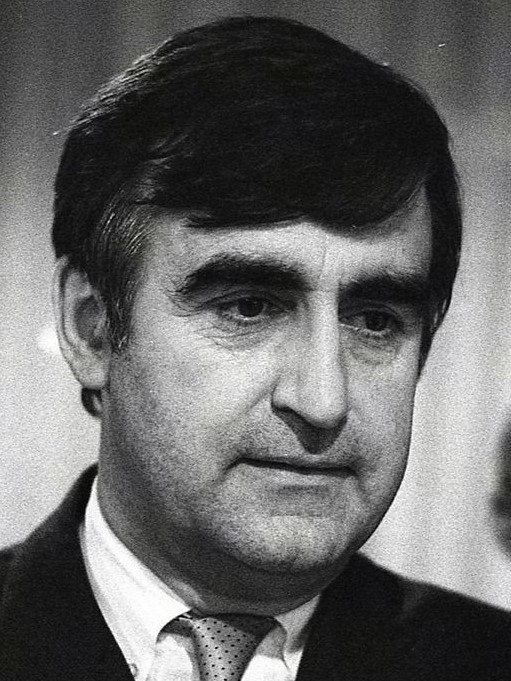

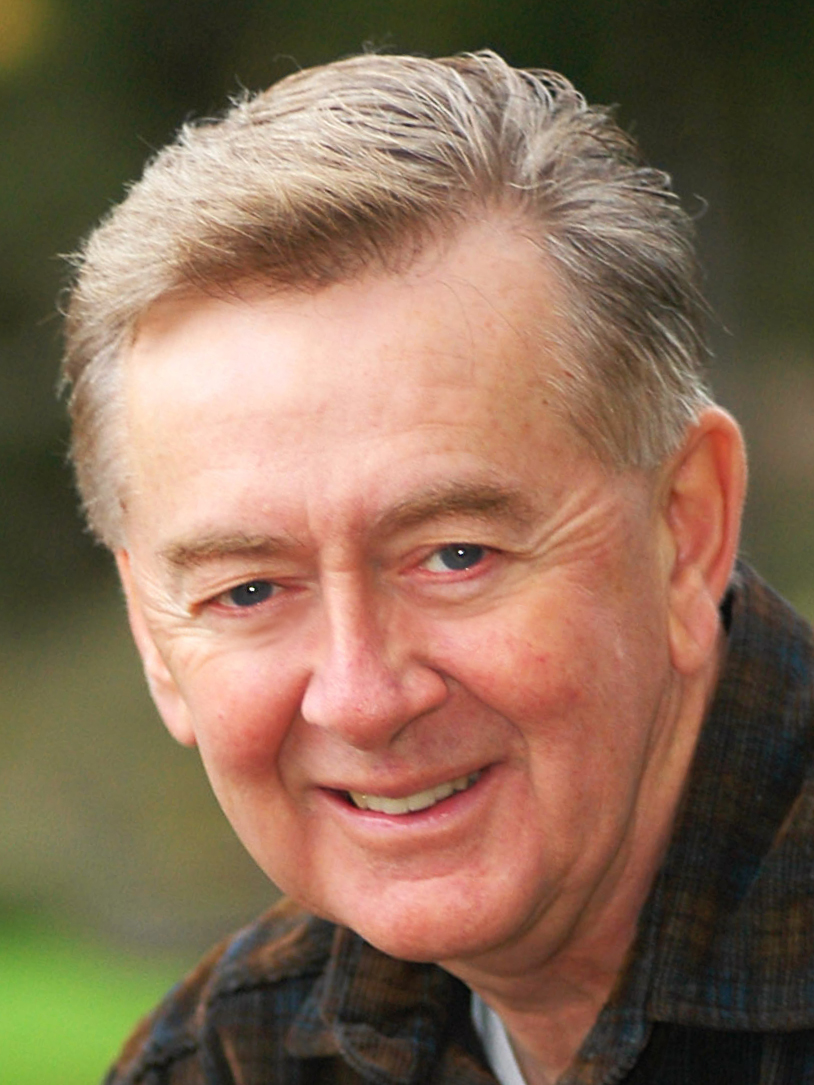

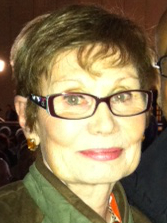

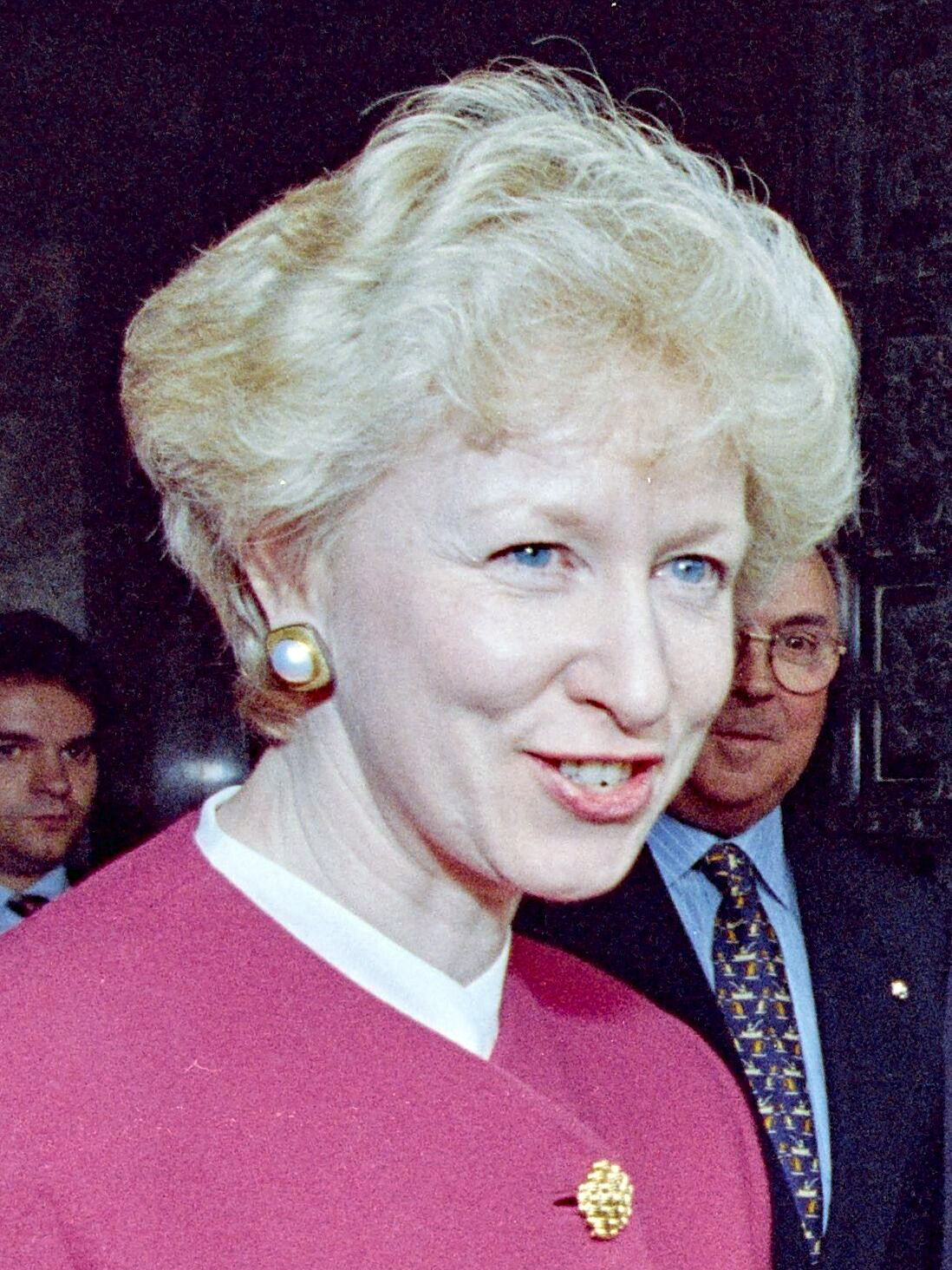
	First party	Second party	Third party
Leader	Jean Chrétien	Lucien Bouchard	Preston Manning
Party	Liberal	Bloc Québécois	Reform
Leader since	June 23, 1990	July 25, 1990	November 1, 1987
Leader's seat	Ran in Saint-Maurice (won)	Lac-Saint-Jean	Ran in Calgary Southwest (won)
Last election	83 seats, 31.92%	New party	0 seats, 2.09%
Seats before	81	10	1
Seats won	177	54	52
Seat change	▲96	▲44	▲51
Popular vote	5,647,952	1,846,024	2,559,245
Percentage	41.24%	13.52% (Note: Only contested seats in Quebec.)	18.69% (Note: Did not contest seats in Quebec.)
Swing	▲9.32 pp	New party	▲16.60 pp
	Fourth party	Fifth party
Leader	Audrey McLaughlin	Kim Campbell
Party	New Democratic	Progressive Conservative
Leader since	December 5, 1989	June 13, 1993
Leader's seat	Yukon	Vancouver Centre (lost re-election)
Last election	43 seats, 20.38%	169 seats, 43.02%
Seats before	44	156
Seats won	9	2
Seat change	▼35	▼154
Popular vote	939,575	2,186,422
Percentage	6.88%	16.04%
Swing	▼13.50 pp	▼26.98 pp

- The Canadian parliament after the 1993 election
Prime Minister before election
Kim Campbell
Progressive Conservative
Prime Minister after election
Jean Chrétien
Liberal

The 1993 Canadian federal election was held on October 25, 1993, to elect members to the House of Commons of the 35th Parliament of Canada. Considered to be a major political realignment, it was one of the most eventful elections in Canada's history. Two new regionalist parties emerged, finishing second and third in seat count. Most notably, the election marked the worst defeat for a governing party at the federal level and one of the worst ever suffered by a governing party in the Western democratic world. The Liberal Party, led by Jean Chrétien, won a majority government, defeating the governing Progressive Conservative Party in a landslide. The 22.6% gap between the Liberals and the newly formed Reform Party is the largest difference between the top-two popular vote parties in Canadian federal election history.

The election was called on September 8, 1993, by the new Progressive Conservative (PC) leader, Prime Minister Kim Campbell, near the end of her party's five year mandate. When she succeeded longtime Prime Minister Brian Mulroney and assumed office on 25 June, the party was deeply unpopular due to the failure of the Meech Lake and Charlottetown Accords in 1990 and 1992, respectively, the introduction of the Goods and Services Tax in 1991, and the early 1990s recession. The PCs were further weakened by the emergence of new parties that were competing for its core supporters, including the western-based Reform Party of Canada and the Bloc Québécois advocating for Quebecois sovereignty and separatism, both of which ended up heavily splitting the PC vote.

Campbell's initial efforts helped the party recover somewhat in pre-election polls before the writs were issued on 8 September. However, this momentum did not last. The Progressive Conservatives launched a controversial attack ad during the campaign in hopes of staunching the bleeding. It did not work; the Progressive Conservatives suffered the most lopsided defeat for a Canadian governing party at the federal level, losing 154 seats and official party status in the House of Commons and more than half of their vote from 1988.

The Western-based Reform Party won over many traditional PC voters, particularly social conservatives, alienated Western Canadians, and fiscal conservatives who opposed the Mulroney government's deficit spending and tax increases. The popularity of Preston Manning, and profound Western discontent with the PCs, led the Reform Party to replace the PCs as the major right-wing party in the Commons, although it won only one seat east of Manitoba. Though the Progressive Conservatives recovered slightly in the 1997 election, they lost seats in 2000 and would never be a major force in Canadian politics again. In 2003, the Progressive Conservative Party ceased to exist when it merged with the larger Canadian Alliance (the successor of the Reform Party) to create the new Conservative Party of Canada.

The sovereigntist Bloc Québécois won almost half of the popular vote in Quebec and became the Official Opposition despite finishing fourth in the popular vote. To date, this is the only time that a party committed to the political secession of a region of Canada has become the Official Opposition of Canada, and the only time a party not first or second in the popular vote would form Opposition. (The Progressives won the second-most seats in 1921 with the third-most votes, but declined to form Opposition, and the second-place Conservatives did in lieu). The traditional third party, the New Democratic Party (NDP), collapsed to nine seats only one election after having what was then its best performance. It remained the NDP's worst result until the 2025 federal election. The turnover of MPs was stark and unprecedented for Canadian politics, with 132 MPs losing their seats. In total, 194 out of 295 ridings changed hands. Having been defeated in her Vancouver Centre riding, Campbell became the first incumbent prime minister since William Lyon Mackenzie King in 1945 to lose a House of Commons seat in a bid for re-election. This was the only election in Canadian history in which a governing party failed to win enough seats to attain official party status. This was also the first election since 1930 in which the winning party obtained a majority government without winning the most seats in Quebec.

== Background ==
The Liberal Party had dominated Canadian politics for much of the 20th century. The party had been in office for all but 22 years between 1896 and 1984, with the Conservatives/Progressive Conservatives only forming government seven times during this period: in 1911, 1917, 1921 and 1926 (both under Arthur Meighen, without election), 1930, 1957, and 1979.

=== Mulroney era ===
In 1984, Brian Mulroney led the Progressive Conservatives to a majority government with the most seats in Canadian history, winning a majority of the seats in every province and a majority of votes cast. The Liberals lost 95 seats in the worst defeat for a governing party at the federal level at the time.

The PCs made a strong showing in Quebec, a province where they had held few seats for much of the century. Between 1896 and 1984, they had only taken a majority of seats in that province once, in their 1958 landslide—the only other time besides 1984 that a party won more than 200 seats in an election. After winning only one seat in Quebec (out of 75) in 1980, the Tories won 58 seats in 1984, leaving the Liberals with almost no seats outside of Montreal.

Mulroney's government was based on a coalition of socially conservative populists from the West, fiscal conservatives from Atlantic Canada and Ontario, and Quebec nationalists. This coalition helped him win reelection in 1988 (an election almost wholly focused on the proposed Canada–United States Free Trade Agreement) but with only a plurality of the votes cast this time. Over the next five years, the popularity of Mulroney and his party declined further. The late 1980s recession severely harmed the Canadian economy, as both unemployment and the public debt grew. Despite the government's pledges to reduce the annual federal deficit, it grew from $34.5 billion in 1984, when Mulroney took power, to more than $40 billion by the time Mulroney stepped down in 1993. The federal debt was at $500 billion in 1993. Mulroney brought in the unpopular Goods and Services Tax (GST) in 1991 and his governing policies were broadly unpopular by early 1993.

While Mulroney had railed against Pierre Trudeau's patronage appointments in 1984, he permitted a series of patronage appointments just as he left the PM's office in 1993.

==== Quebec constitutional status ====
Mulroney had also promised to change the constitutional status quo in favour of increasing provincial autonomy; this was one of the most important reasons for his party's support in Quebec. He attempted to amend the constitution twice, but both reform proposals failed. The Meech Lake Accord collapsed in 1990 when the provincial legislatures of Newfoundland and Manitoba adjourned without bringing the issue to a vote; all 10 provincial legislatures had to ratify the accord for it to become law. The Charlottetown Accord was rejected by the Canadian people in an October 1992 referendum. In the case of the Charlottetown Accord, the majority of Canada's population voted against an agreement endorsed by every First Minister and most other political groups. This stinging rebuke against the "political class" in Canada was a preview of things to come, as the upcoming election would be held on October 25, 1993, a year less a day after the Charlottetown referendum. Additional polls in January 1993 concerning the cost-of-living crisis in the country showed that public opinion was broadly against the unpopular PCs.

=== Campbell replaces Mulroney ===
These factors combined to make Mulroney the least popular leader since opinion polling began in the 1940s. The Progressive Conservative Party's popularity reached a low of just over 15% in 1991. With polls showing him facing almost certain defeat in the next election, Mulroney announced his retirement from politics (which had been speculated since early February) on 24 February 1993. While several senior Cabinet members had passed over contesting the leadership, Minister of Defence Kim Campbell quickly emerged as the leading candidate to replace Mulroney as party leader and prime minister. Despite a vigorous challenge from Environment Minister Jean Charest, Campbell emerged victorious in the June leadership election and became Canada's first female prime minister.

Campbell enjoyed a brief period of high popularity upon being sworn in, becoming the eponym of "Campbellmania", just as Pierre Trudeau had been the subject of late-1960s Trudeaumania. She was polling favorably by mid-March of that year. Campbell campaigned extensively during the summer, touring the nation and attending barbecues and other events.

=== Opposition parties ===
The other traditional parties were also not faring well. While John Turner and the Liberal leadership supported the Meech Lake Accord, there was significant internal disagreement, with Trudeau returning from retirement to speak out against it. After the Liberals' disappointing showing in the 1988 election, Turner stayed on for a couple of years before resigning. The party then selected veteran politician Jean Chrétien over Paul Martin as party leader after a divisive battle, but Chrétien was unpopular, especially in his native Quebec, after declaring his opposition to the Meech Lake Accord, being rocked by caucus defections. The federal Liberals were disorganized, near bankruptcy, and dropped in the polls from 50 to 32 per cent, so Chrétien appointed Jean Pelletier as chief of staff to reinvigorate his leadership and reorganize his office. As the ruling Tories suffered the most backlash from the unsuccessful constitutional amendments in 1990 and 1992, the Liberals rapidly picked up support and surged to a wide lead in opinion polling.

The New Democratic Party (NDP) had won a record 43 seats in 1988 under Ed Broadbent, who retired the next year. In the following few years, their support continued to grow, at one point leading in the opinion polls. This helped the NDP win a series of victories at the provincial level. In a surprise victory in 1990, Bob Rae led the party to office in Ontario–the first time the NDP had formed a provincial government east of Manitoba. That same year, the NDP won a by-election in Quebec to take its first-ever seat in that province. The next year, under Mike Harcourt, the New Democrats were elected in British Columbia. Within a few years, however, the NDP provincial ministries in both Ontario and British Columbia became deeply unpopular, and support for the federal NDP also began to fall. In a deviation from their traditional position as staunch federalists, the NDP chose to align itself with the Liberals and PCs on the "yes" side of the 1992 Charlottetown Accord. As well, new leader Audrey McLaughlin made efforts to expand party support into Quebec instead of focusing on Western alienation, having defeated Dave Barrett, who had campaigned for the opposite policies. These positions gained the NDP little headway in Quebec and hurt the party's standing as the traditional voice of Western protest.

=== New parties ===
The greatest difference from 1988 was the rise of two new parties that cut into the Progressive Conservatives' support and caused Mulroney's "grand coalition" to implode.

After the failure of the Meech Lake Accord, Lucien Bouchard led a group of Progressive Conservative and Liberal MPs to form the Bloc Québécois. This party quickly gained the support of Quebec sovereigntists and access to the networks of the provincial Parti Québécois. Gilles Duceppe won a 1990 by-election, and throughout the period leading up to the election, the Bloc polled as the most popular party in Quebec.

The Reform Party of Canada was a Western-based populist party led by Preston Manning, the son of former Alberta Premier Ernest Manning. Originally broadly focused on Western Canadian interests, it had quickly moved far to the right after its formation. It originally campaigned under the slogan "the West wants in". Reform had nominated candidates in the 1988 election, but had failed to win any seats, and garnered only 2.5 per cent of the popular vote. Many Western voters had never forgiven the Liberals for the National Energy Program in the 1980s, and Mulroney's attempt to pacify Quebec caused them to rethink their support for the Tories. In early 1989, Deborah Grey won a by-election in a north-central Alberta riding to become the first Reform MP. This came as a considerable shock to Tories, who had dominated Alberta's federal politics for a quarter-century, as Grey had finished a distant fourth in the general election held a few months earlier.

As Conservative support collapsed over the next four years, Reform party support increased. Reform also picked up support from many longtime NDP voters. The NDP (and its predecessor, the Co-operative Commonwealth Federation) had been the traditional Western protest party for most of the previous 40 years, but since the 1990s, the NDP had attempted to make inroads in Quebec and had joined the Progressive Conservatives and Liberals in supporting the Charlottetown Accord. Despite sharp ideological differences, Reform's populism struck a responsive chord in some disaffected NDP supporters.

== Opinion polling ==
Graph of opinion polls conducted

== Campaign ==
=== Pre-campaign ===
An election had to be called in the fall of 1993, since Parliament's term would expire some time in September. By the end of the summer, Campbell's personal popularity was far ahead of that of Chrétien. Support for the Progressive Conservative Party had also increased after Campbell won the leadership, and their polling numbers were roughly equal to the Liberals, while Reform had been reduced to single digits. It was nevertheless thought likely that Reform would hold the balance of power in the event of neither the Progressive Conservatives nor Liberals winning a majority, as the NDP were polling even worse than Reform, while the Bloc were considered unlikely to enter into a confidence and supply agreement with either of the two largest parties. Campbell was therefore seen as having a good chance of remaining in power if the Progressive Conservatives could at least finish with a similar number of seats to the Liberals, and that Reform would support a continuation of her government (likely in return for some concessions on fiscal policy) over one led by Chrétien.

With this in mind, Campbell asked Governor General Ray Hnatyshyn to dissolve parliament on September 8, only a few weeks before Parliament was due to expire. The election date was set for October 25. Under the Canadian Charter of Rights and Freedoms, this was the last day that the election could legally be held with the then-current enumeration still valid. In accordance with Canadian constitutional practice, Hnatyshyn granted the dissolution, beginning the seven-week campaign.

At the ceremony at Rideau Hall, Campbell made the first of a series of remarks that would dog the Conservative campaign. When she was running for the party leadership, Campbell's frank honesty was seen as an important asset and a sharp contrast from Mulroney's highly polished style (Mulroney was criticized for waiting until the last year of his mandate before resigning, leaving office only 2 1/2 months before the Tories' five-year term ended, as well as for his international farewell tour devoid of any official business). During the campaign, however, Campbell repeatedly made statements that caused problems for the party. At the Rideau Hall event, she told reporters that it was unlikely that the deficit or unemployment would be much reduced before the "end of the century". Later in the campaign, a reporter claimed she stated "an election is no time to discuss serious issues." Campbell denied the report and declared her sentence was distorted; her actual quote meant that 47 days were not enough to discuss the overhaul in social policy that she thought Canada needed.

=== Progressive Conservative ===
Progressive Conservative Party logo during the election.

The PC campaign was headed by chair John Tory and chief strategist Allan Gregg, both experienced Mulroney loyalists. It was the best-funded campaign, but it quickly ran into organizational problems. The party failed to get literature distributed to the local campaigns, forcing all the PC candidates to print their own material and thus preventing the party from putting forth a unified message. The Progressive Conservative campaign was focused on three issues: job creation, deficit reduction, and improving quality of life; the party, however, had little credibility on the first two, as over their time in office both unemployment and the deficit had increased dramatically. The party was also reluctant to propose new fiscal or social programs, as in Quebec they had to appeal to nationalists who opposed federal government intervention, and in the West had to appeal to Reform supporters who opposed government intervention in general.

In addition, what remained of the initial euphoria over Campbell quickly wore off as the campaign progressed. Her style was initially seen as frank and honest, but as her numbers dropped she was seen as condescending and pretentious. The Tories also continued to be dogged by the long shadow of the unpopular Mulroney.

=== Liberal ===
Liberal Party logo during the election

The Liberals had long prepared for the campaign. They had amassed a substantial campaign war chest, almost as large as that of the Tories. On September 19, the Liberals released their entire platform, which the media quickly named the Red Book. This document gave a detailed account of exactly what a Liberal government would do in power. Several years of effort had gone into the creation of the document, which was unprecedented for a Canadian party. Several days later, the Progressive Conservatives released the hastily assembled A Taxpayer's Agenda, but the Liberals had captured the reputation of being the party with ideas. The Liberals were also consistently well organized and on message, in contrast to the PC campaign, which the Globe and Mail on September 25 stated was "shaping up to be the most incompetent campaign in modern political history."

=== New Democratic ===
The federal NDP logo during the election.

The New Democratic Party suffered badly in the election. With the rising unpopularity of the Ontario NDP government of Bob Rae, many traditional NDP voters were disenchanted and moved to the Liberal Party. In Western Canada, a portion of the NDP vote was attracted to the right-wing Reform party as a protest vote, as that party's populism struck a chord despite the sharp ideological differences between the two parties (as the centre-left NDP and right-wing Reform were on completely opposite sides of the political spectrum), and some went to the Liberals as well. Nationally, frustration with the PC party was also so high that some traditional NDP voters moved to the Liberals as a strategic vote. Although McLaughlin was returned in her own seat (Yukon), elsewhere the NDP was only truly competitive in Saskatchewan - even there, they finished third place in the popular vote although it was still enough to tie the Liberals for a plurality of seats at five (one more than the Reform Party).

=== Bloc Québécois ===
Logo of the Bloc Québécois during the election.

The Bloc Québécois benefited from a surge in support for Quebec nationalism after the failure of the Meech Lake Accord in 1990, which resulted in a number of Liberal and Progressive Conservative Members of Parliament (MPs) organizing the Bloc. The Bloc's leader, Lucien Bouchard, campaigned on promising that the Bloc would represent Quebec's interests at the federal level, with the party running candidates exclusively in Quebec while endorsing and supporting Quebec sovereignty (political independence from Canada).

=== Reform ===
Logo of the Reform Party during the election.

The Reform Party developed an extensive grassroots network in much of western Canada and Ontario. Reform's support for populist policies, such as a democratically elected and regionally equal Senate and more plebiscites and referendums in the political process, was very popular in Western Canada. In addition, Reform's backing of smaller government, lower taxes, the North American Free Trade Agreement, and social conservative policies as well as its opposition to the Goods and Services Tax won over many conservatives in the West and Ontario.

Small-"c" conservatives in the West and Ontario who traditionally supported the Progressive Conservatives were drawn to Reform for several reasons. These conservative voters were disenchanted with the PCs for imposing the Goods and Services Tax and failing to reduce Canada's growing deficit and national debt. There was also the PC government's failure to deliver a democratically elected Senate as it had promised (while appointing unelected Senators in 1990, as it was obligated to do), its socially progressive policies, and its repeated failed attempts to officially bring Quebec into the Constitution, a focus that was seen as coming at the expense of attention to the concerns of other regions, especially the West.

Reform had little money and few resources, with its candidates and campaign staff flying economy class, staying in cheap hotels, and relying on pre-packaged lunches, all which helped endear them to money-conscious fiscal conservatives. The campaign was managed by seasoned political strategist Rick Anderson. Some Reformers had been annoyed that a moderate former Liberal and Ottawa insider had been made campaign manager, but he soon proved his political ability.

Reform found itself embroiled in controversy when Toronto-area candidate John Beck made a series of anti-immigrant remarks in an interview with Excalibur, the York University student paper. York students confronted Manning with the remarks, who immediately denounced them. Within an hour, Beck was forced to withdraw his candidacy.

=== Leaders debates ===
Polls during the campaign
Firm	Date	PC	LPC	NDP	BQ	Ref	Lead
Angus Reid	September 9	35	37	8	8	10	2
Comquest Research	September 14	36	33	8	10	11	3
Angus Reid	September 16	35	35	6	11	11	Tie
CBC	September 22	31	36	7	11	13	5
Gallup	September 25	30	37	8	10	13	7
Compass Research	September 26	26	38	8	12	14	12
Environics	September 26	31	36	7	11	13	5
Leger & Leger	September 26	28	34	7	12	15	6
Ekos	September 28	25	39	6	12	17	14
Angus Reid	October 6	22	37	8	12	18	15
Compass Research	October 16	22	40	7	13	16	18
Leger & Leger	October 19	21	39	6	14	17	18
Angus Reid	October 22	18	43	7	14	18	25
Gallup	October 22	16	44	7	12	19	25
Election result	October 25	16.0	41.2	6.9	13.5	18.7	22.5

Graph of opinion polls conducted during the campaign View source data.

Over the course of the campaign, Progressive Conservative support steadily bled away to the other parties. The leaders debates were held October 3 and 4, and were generally regarded as inconclusive, with no party gaining a boost from them. The most memorable moment involved Lucien Bouchard continuously questioning Campbell about the real deficit in the 1993 budget and Campbell dodging the question. The French debates were held on the first night. Manning, who did not speak French, read prepared opening and closing remarks, but did not participate in the debate itself.

=== Chrétien ad ===
By October, the Progressive Conservatives were considerably behind the Liberals in the polls, and it was obvious that they would not be reelected. The consensus was that the Liberals were on their way to at least a minority government, and would probably win a majority without dramatic measures. Despite this, Campbell was still far more personally popular than Chrétien. Polling found that a considerable number of potential Liberal voters held negative opinions about Chrétien.

Believing they had no other way to keep the Liberals from winning a majority, Gregg and Tory decided to launch a series of commercials attacking Chrétien. While the ad's creators claim they had meant for the line "I would be very embarrassed if he became Prime Minister of Canada" to refer to Chrétien's policies and ethics, the intercutting with images of his face and its facial deformity (caused by Bell's palsy) were interpreted by many as an attack on Chrétien's appearance. The ad quickly received widespread attention as the Liberal war room under Roméo LeBlanc immediately contacted media outlets. This generated a severe backlash from all sides of the spectrum, including some PC candidates, and Campbell ordered them off the air.

Chrétien turned the situation to his advantage, comparing his opponents to the children who teased him when he was a boy. "When I was a kid people were laughing at me. But I accepted that because God gave me other qualities and I'm grateful." Chrétien's approval ratings shot up, nullifying the only advantage the Progressive Conservatives still had over him. The Tories also pointed out that Chrétien himself had used his half-paralyzed face in the campaign, with Liberal signs in Quebec that translated as "Strange-looking face, but reflect on what's inside." Furthermore, most newspapers and magazines had used similar photos that highlighted Chrétien's facial deformity.

Aside from raising Chrétien's personal popularity, it is unclear what effect the ad had on the election. Prior to the controversy, the Campbell Tories were already beset by many problems; notably the recession, the unpopular GST, and their support bases moving to Reform and the Bloc. Nonetheless, the negative backlash over the television spot proved to be the final nail in the Tories' coffin. Their support plummeted into the teens, all but assuring that the Liberals would win a majority government.

== Issues ==
The most important issue of the 1993 election was the economy. The nation was mired in the early 1990s recession, and unemployment was especially high. The federal deficit was also extremely high, and both the Reform and Progressive Conservatives focused on cutting it as the path to economic health. Reform proposed deep cuts to federal programs in order to do this, while the Progressive Conservatives were less specific. The Liberals also promised cuts, focusing on the unpopular and expensive plan to buy new military helicopters to replace the aging Sea Kings. They also promised new programs such as a limited public works programme and a national child care program. The Reform Party called for a "Zero in Three" plan that would reduce the deficit to zero in three years. The Liberals had a far more modest plan to reduce the deficit to 3% of GDP by the end of their first term. All opposition parties pledged to repeal the Goods and Services Tax. Once elected, however, the Liberals reneged on this pledge to much outcry, stating the Conservatives had understated the size of the deficit. Instead the GST remained. In some provinces it was Harmonized with the Provincial sales tax, while in other provinces the GST and the Provincial Sales Tax remained separate.

The 1988 election had been almost wholly focused on the issue of the Free Trade Agreement with the United States, and similarly, the 1993 election was preceded by the agreement on the North American Free Trade Agreement (NAFTA). The Liberals opposed NAFTA and promised to try to renegotiate the FTA, but this was not a central campaign theme. The NDP did focus on opposition to NAFTA, but the Canadian people mostly felt that the free trade debate was over. When in office, the Liberals signed on to NAFTA with little opposition. Similarly, while constitutional issues had dominated the national debate for several years, two failed reform proposals led most to support giving the issue a rest. Chrétien promised not to reopen the constitution, and that under the Liberals any change would be incremental in nature. In Quebec the election was seen as a prelude to the next Quebec election and the referendum on secession that was sure to follow.

The Reform Party advanced proposals in a number of areas that challenged the status quo. It proposed extensive reform to Canada's parliamentary system, including more free votes, recall elections, and change to the Senate. The party also advocated a reduction in immigration levels and a retreat from official bilingualism.

== Finances ==
The election was held under the Election Expenses Act of 1974. This forced parties to disclose most donations, but put few limits on who could donate and how much could be given. Individual donations up to $1,150 were given a tax credit, encouraging such pledges. The Conservatives had the largest budget, spending $10.4 million on their national campaign; the Liberals spent $9.9 million, while the NDP spent $7.4 million. The Bloc and Reform both spent less than $2 million on their national campaigns. Actual election spending is far larger than these numbers indicate: each candidate raised substantial amounts of money independently of the national campaign. In this era there were also large expenses, such as polling and fundraising costs, that did not need to be disclosed.

In the year of the election, two traditional parties, the Liberals and Conservatives, each received about 60% of their funding from corporations and the rest from individuals. For the NDP half of the funding came from individuals, and a third came from trade unions. The Reform Party relied almost wholly on individual donations, with only some 12% coming from corporations. The Bloc relied almost solely on individual donations, as its party charter barred donations from corporations. The NDP had by far the most donors, with over 65,000, but the average donation was only $80. By contrast the 45,000 Conservative donors gave more than $200 on average.

The NDP and Conservatives had more problems after the vote. The NDP found itself deeply in debt, but recouped some of it by selling their Ottawa headquarters to the new Ukrainian Embassy. The Conservatives, despite cutting back on spending late in the campaign, were some $7.5 million in debt by the end of the election, and it took years to clear this burden. The heavy debt load would hamper the party's ability to campaign in subsequent elections, and this would lead to its eventual merger with Reform's successor, the Canadian Alliance.

== Minor parties ==
Fourteen registered political parties contested the election, a Canadian record. Jackson and Jackson, in their book Politics in Canada, argue that the proliferation of minor parties was an outgrowth of the single-issue political movements that had come to prominence in Canada in the 1980s. For instance, the environmentalist, anti-abortion, and anti-free trade movements all had closely associated parties. Each candidate required a $1,000 deposit, an increase from $200 in the last election. If the candidate did not win 15% of the vote, which none of the minor parties did, these deposits would be forfeit. Parties that nominated 50 candidates qualified as official parties and, most importantly, received government subsidies for advertising. The smaller parties were not invited to the main leaders debate, something Mel Hurtig of the National Party complained vehemently about. The Green Party of Canada Chief Agent Greg Vezina organized a debate between the leaders of seven of the minor parties on October 5, which was broadcast on CBC Newsworld and CPAC. The National Party did not attend.

Few of these parties were expected to win a seat. One exception was the National Party. Founded by Mel Hurtig, a prominent nationalist, it campaigned on a strongly economically nationalist, broadly centre-left platform focusing on opposition to the North American Free Trade Agreement (NAFTA). The party ran 171 candidates, and for a time polling indicated it could potentially have an impact. However, the party failed to make a significant impression and imploded due to internal party turmoil. Some time after the election it applied to Canada's Chief Election officer to de-register the party. Another prominent minor party was the Natural Law Party. Linked to Maharishi Mahesh Yogi, it advocated yogic flying as the solution to most of Canada's ills. It ran 231 candidates, more than some major parties. Its campaign was also accompanied by several million dollars of advertising, and it was successful in attracting media attention. Some accused its efforts of actually being government-subsidized marketing for yogic flying centres, which are non-profit, non-religious meditation centres. Other minor parties included the Green Party of Canada which ran 79 candidates, Libertarian Party of Canada, the Marxist–Leninist Party of Canada and the Christian Heritage Party, which was mainly dedicated to opposing abortion. The election saw three minor parties focused on radical reform to the monetary system: the Canada Party, the Abolitionist Party, and the Party for the Commonwealth of Canada, which was formed by supporters of U.S. fringe politician Lyndon LaRouche.

This election was also the last time that the Social Credit Party attempted to run candidates in an election. The party had been in headlong decline since losing its last Member of Parliament in 1980, and was now led by fundamentalist Christian preacher Ken Campbell. Campbell briefly changed the party's name to the "Christian Freedom Party" in an attempt to appeal to social conservatives. However, the party failed to nominate the minimum 50 candidates and was deregistered by Elections Canada.

The satirical Rhinoceros Party was likewise deregistered after they declined to contest the election, in protest of new electoral laws that required parties to run 50 candidates at a cost of $1,000 per riding. Unlike the Socreds, however, the Rhinos would eventually reform in 2006, once the 50-candidate requirement had been dropped, and began contesting federal elections again beginning with the 2008 election.

Several unrecognized parties also contested the election, including the Canadian Party for Renewal (which was closely aligned with the Communist Party of Canada (Marxist–Leninist)).

== Results ==
This election, like all previous Canadian elections, was conducted under a single-member plurality (or first past the post) system in which the country was carved into 295 electoral districts, or ridings, with each one electing one representative to the House of Commons. Those eligible to vote cast their ballot for a candidate in their electoral district, and the candidate with the most votes in that district became that riding's Member of Parliament. The party that has the confidence of the House (i.e. that can rely on the votes of the most MPs) forms the government. By convention, its leader is appointed Prime Minister and its Members of Parliament to the Cabinet of Canada by the Governor General.

For a complete list of MPs elected in the 1993 election, see 35th Canadian parliament.

Party	Party leader	# of candidates	Seats				Popular vote		
Party	Party leader	# of candidates	1988	Dissol.	Elected	% Change	#	%	Change
Liberal	Jean Chrétien	295	83	79	177	+113.3%	5,647,952	41.24%	+9.32%
Bloc Québécois	Lucien Bouchard	75	*	10	54	*	1,846,024	13.52%	*
Reform	Preston Manning	207	-	1	52		2,559,245	18.69%	+16.59%
New Democratic Party	Audrey McLaughlin	294	43	44	9	−79.1%	939,575	6.88%	−13.50%
Progressive Conservative	Kim Campbell	295	169	154	2	−98.8%	2,186,422	16.04%	−26.97%
Independent		129	-	3	1		60,434	0.73%	+0.56%
National	Mel Hurtig	170	*	-	-	*	187,251	1.38%	*
Natural Law	Neil Paterson	231	*	-	-	*	84,743	0.63%	*
No affiliation		23	-	-	-	-	48,959	0.09%	−0.10%
Green	Chris Lea	79	-	-	-	-	32,979	0.24%	−0.12%
Christian Heritage	Heather Stilwell	59	-	-	-	-	30,358	0.22%	−0.55%
Libertarian	Hilliard Cox	52	-	-	-	-	14,630	0.11%	−0.14%
Abolitionist	John Turmel	80	*	-	-	*	9,141	0.07%	*
Canada Party	Joseph Thauberger	56	*	-	-	*	7,506	0.06%	*
Commonwealth	Gilles Gervais	59	-	-	-	-	7,316	0.06%	-
Marxist–Leninist	Hardial Bains	51	-	-	-	-	5,136	0.04%	+0.04%
Vacant				4					
Total		2,155	295	295	295	±0.0%	13,667,671	100%	
Notes: *Party did not nominate candidates in the previous; "% change" refers to change from previous election.
Source: Government of Canada, Canadian Elections Database

=== Vote and seat summaries ===
Ternary plots - shift of electoral support (1988-1993)
1988

1993
Electoral districts identified by colours of winning parties

Popular vote
Liberal	41.24%
Reform	18.69%
PC	16.04%
Bloc Québécois	13.52%
NDP	6.88%
Others	3.63%

Seat totals
Liberal	60.00%
Bloc Québécois	18.31%
Reform	17.63%
NDP	3.05%
PC	0.68%
Independents	0.34%

=== Synopsis of results ===
= Open seat
= Turnout is above national average
= Winning candidate held seat in previous House
= Incumbent had switched allegiance
= Previously incumbent in another riding
= Not incumbent; was previously elected to the House
= Incumbency arose from byelection gain
= Other incumbents renominated
= Previously a member of one of the provincial legislatures
= Multiple candidates

Results by riding — 1993 Canadian federal election
Riding		Winning party							Turnout (Note: Including spoiled ballots)	Votes (Note: Minor political parties receiving less than 1% of the popular vote (other than ones which had some candidates receiving more than 1,000 votes) are aggregated under Other)											
Riding		1988	1st place	Votes	Share	Margin #	Margin %	2nd place	Turnout	Lib	Ref	PC	BQ	NDP	Nat'l	NLP	Green	CHP	Ind	Other	Total
Athabasca	AB	PC	Ref	15,350	47.07%	7,330	22.48%	Lib	%	8,020	15,350	6,248	–	2,489	–	195	312	–	–	–	32,614
Beaver River	AB	PC	Ref	17,725	58.00%	10,183	33.32%	Lib	%	7,542	17,725 (Note: Deborah Grey was elected in a 1989 by-election, replacing Conservative John Dahmer who died five days after the 1988 election)	3,854	–	1,050	–	294	–	–	94	–	30,559
Calgary Centre	AB	PC	Ref	22,600	45.08%	7,443	14.85%	Lib	%	15,157	22,600	7,466	–	2,149	1,743	355	484	–	–	183	50,137
Calgary North	AB	PC	Ref	35,508	52.45%	17,609	26.01%	Lib	%	17,899	35,508	10,424	–	1,592	1,361	308	343	–	268	–	67,703
Calgary Northeast	AB	PC	Ref	20,602	44.35%	5,591	12.04%	Lib	%	15,011	20,602	5,229	–	1,310	853	175	134	–	3,136	–	46,450
Calgary Southeast	AB	PC	Ref	33,564	59.85%	22,277	39.72%	PC	%	7,642	33,564	11,287	–	1,888	1,111	443	–	–	–	148	56,083
Calgary Southwest	AB	PC	Ref	41,630	61.22%	28,988	42.63%	PC	%	11,087	41,630	12,642	–	1,099	910	249	301	–	85	–	68,003
Calgary West	AB	PC	Ref	30,209	52.25%	14,895	25.76%	Lib	%	15,314	30,209	9,090	–	1,194	1,068	483	347	116	–	–	57,821
Crowfoot	AB	PC	Ref	23,611	65.98%	17,180	48.01%	PC	%	4,506	23,611	6,431	–	860	–	263	–	–	114	–	35,785
Edmonton East	AB	NDP	Lib	11,922	32.96%	115	0.32%	Ref	%	11,922	11,807	2,672	–	7,976	1,049	212	171	231	51	80	36,171
Edmonton North	AB	PC	Lib	19,536	39.47%	202	0.41%	Ref	%	19,536	19,334	4,592	–	3,427	2,174	256	–	–	77	103	49,499
Edmonton Northwest	AB	PC	Lib	12,599	35.80%	12	0.03%	Ref	%	12,599	12,587	3,485	–	1,671	4,507	186	119	–	41	–	35,195
Edmonton Southeast	AB	PC	Lib	23,129	46.16%	3,219	6.42%	Ref	%	23,129	19,910	3,203	–	1,988	1,457	194	149	–	–	78	50,108
Edmonton Southwest	AB	PC	Ref	26,582	45.45%	7,012	11.99%	Lib	%	19,570	26,582	9,385	–	2,148	–	447	–	–	269	81	58,482
Edmonton—Strathcona	AB	PC	Ref	19,541	39.33%	404	0.81%	Lib	%	19,137	19,541	5,617	–	2,513	2,129	284	286	–	92	83	49,682
Elk Island	AB	PC	Ref	25,726	56.04%	14,137	30.80%	Lib	%	11,589	25,726	5,714	–	1,296	1,222	242	–	–	–	117	45,906
Lethbridge	AB	PC	Ref	24,530	52.63%	12,660	27.16%	Lib	%	11,870	24,530	7,092	–	1,283	1,586	247	–	–	–	–	46,608
Macleod	AB	PC	Ref	23,828	63.27%	17,316	45.98%	PC	%	6,196	23,828	6,512	–	712	–	200	213	–	–	–	37,661
Medicine Hat	AB	PC	Ref	22,439	54.71%	13,884	33.85%	Lib	%	8,555	22,439	6,934	–	1,832	–	–	–	989	–	262	41,011
Peace River	AB	PC	Ref	25,761	60.22%	19,132	44.73%	Lib	%	6,629	25,761	6,144	–	2,344	1,656	241	–	–	–	–	42,775
Red Deer	AB	PC	Ref	31,876	64.81%	23,870	48.54%	PC	%	6,614	31,876	8,006	–	1,313	1,074	297	–	–	–	–	49,180
St. Albert	AB	PC	Ref	24,964	50.94%	11,104	22.66%	Lib	%	13,860	24,964	5,884	–	1,435	2,219	257	–	294	90	–	49,003
Vegreville	AB	PC	Ref	19,732	54.74%	11,552	32.05%	PC	%	5,610	19,732	8,180	–	1,175	562	191	–	–	597	–	36,047
Wetaskiwin	AB	PC	Ref	26,210	63.41%	19,296	46.69%	Lib	%	6,914	26,210	6,124	–	1,475	–	274	–	–	–	335	41,332
Wild Rose	AB	PC	Ref	30,986	63.75%	23,444	48.23%	PC	%	6,902	30,986	7,542	–	1,067	809	204	457	–	642	–	48,609
Yellowhead	AB	PC	Ref	22,790	55.04%	13,826	33.39%	Lib	%	8,964	22,790	5,799	–	1,811	1,147	251	–	441	202	–	41,405
Burnaby—Kingsway	BC	NDP	NDP	18,273	34.15%	4,217	7.88%	Lib	%	14,056	13,389	5,327	–	18,273	1,493	270	–	–	170	534	53,512
Capilano—Howe Sound	BC	PC	Ref	19,259	41.95%	4,653	10.14%	Lib	%	14,606	19,259	8,130	–	1,529	1,467	274	448	–	105	92	45,910
Cariboo—Chilcotin	BC	PC	Ref	11,510	36.44%	3,049	9.65%	Lib	%	8,461	11,510	7,050	–	3,286	537	222	206	–	–	315	31,587
Comox—Alberni	BC	NDP	Ref	25,000	44.17%	13,466	23.79%	Lib	%	11,534	25,000	5,461	–	9,365	3,283	299	1,313	–	276	72	56,603
Delta	BC	PC	Ref	18,289	38.20%	3,680	7.69%	Lib	%	14,609	18,289	10,054	–	2,725	1,254	190	172	354	213	12	47,872
Esquimalt—Juan de Fuca	BC	NDP	Ref	16,352	35.29%	3,752	8.10%	NDP	%	9,970	16,352	4,582	–	12,600	2,214	426	–	–	98	97	46,339
Fraser Valley East	BC	PC	Ref	23,494	45.91%	7,712	15.07%	Lib	%	15,782	23,494	6,648	–	2,724	851	205	243	1,158	–	67	51,172
Fraser Valley West	BC	PC	Ref	30,667	49.10%	12,220	19.56%	Lib	%	18,447	30,667	7,135	–	3,237	1,281	336	–	1,036	79	245	62,463
Kamloops	BC	NDP	NDP	16,063	36.28%	4,216	9.52%	Ref	%	10,776	11,847	3,857	–	16,063	1,399	133	–	–	41	154	44,270
Kootenay East	BC	NDP	Ref	17,050	48.42%	9,135	25.94%	Lib	%	7,915	17,050	3,840	–	5,107	582	158	293	194	–	71	35,210
Kootenay West—Revelstoke	BC	NDP	Ref	11,348	32.46%	728	2.08%	Lib	%	10,620	11,348	3,111	–	5,483	2,983	191	809	336	–	79	34,960
Mission—Coquitlam	BC	NDP	Ref	20,168	36.71%	5,394	9.82%	Lib	%	14,774	20,168	6,445	–	9,210	2,739	294	397	479	202	228	54,936
Nanaimo—Cowichan	BC	NDP	Ref	25,339	41.22%	11,499	18.71%	Lib	%	13,840	25,339	5,614	–	12,018	3,470	507	–	–	323	361	61,472
New Westminster—Burnaby	BC	NDP	Ref	16,262	29.33%	814	1.47%	Lib	%	15,448	16,262	6,419	–	14,441	1,766	371	314	–	73	344	55,438
North Island—Powell River	BC	NDP	Ref	18,256	39.28%	6,376	13.72%	Lib	%	11,880	18,256	3,673	–	7,823	3,418	254	1,015	–	–	158	46,477
North Vancouver	BC	PC	Ref	20,213	39.97%	4,279	8.46%	Lib	%	15,934	20,213	7,765	–	3,220	2,220	448	493	–	147	134	50,574
Okanagan Centre	BC	PC	Ref	30,703	46.62%	15,015	22.80%	Lib	%	15,688	30,703	12,629	–	4,562	1,082	211	666	–	134	179	65,854
Okanagan—Shuswap	BC	NDP	Ref	20,930	42.44%	9,227	18.71%	NDP	%	9,082	20,930	4,865	–	11,703	2,009	130	312	–	213	78	49,322
Okanagan—Similkameen—Merritt	BC	NDP	Ref	21,151	43.59%	9,268	19.10%	Lib	%	11,883	21,151	6,150	–	7,201	1,181	267	472	–	–	217	48,522
Port Moody—Coquitlam	BC	NDP	Ref	20,257	33.97%	3,711	6.22%	Lib	%	16,546	20,257	7,641	–	12,616	1,556	333	329	–	64	283	59,625
Prince George–Bulkley Valley	BC	NDP	Ref	14,757	40.29%	6,231	17.01%	NDP	%	8,147	14,757	4,463	–	8,526	–	176	203	351	–	–	36,623
Prince George—Peace River	BC	PC	Ref	20,775	56.39%	13,584	36.87%	Lib	%	7,191	20,775	4,153	–	4,051	–	295	–	199	63	116	36,843
Richmond	BC	PC	Lib	21,457	37.05%	3,557	6.14%	Ref	%	21,457	17,900	11,033	–	3,633	2,271	333	336	282	512	155	57,912
Saanich—Gulf Islands	BC	NDP	Ref	26,480	37.21%	8,038	11.29%	Lib	%	18,442	26,480	8,222	–	13,414	3,817	524	–	–	217	53	71,169
Skeena	BC	NDP	Ref	11,994	37.90%	4,408	13.93%	Lib	%	7,586	11,994	2,137	–	6,535	2,420	150	178	647	–	–	31,647
Surrey North	BC	NDP	Ref	22,390	36.94%	6,413	10.58%	Lib	%	15,977	22,390	8,381	–	10,355	2,014	376	–	907	128	84	60,612
Surrey—White Rock—South Langley	BC	PC	Ref	32,198	44.11%	7,515	10.30%	Lib	%	24,683	32,198	8,885	–	3,029	2,387	251	464	877	59	158	72,991
Vancouver Centre	BC	PC	Lib	20,095	31.09%	3,821	5.91%	PC	%	20,095	11,235	16,274	–	9,830	5,144	670	616	254	232	279	64,629
Vancouver East	BC	NDP	Lib	14,237	35.98%	1,898	4.80%	NDP	%	14,237	4,671	3,484	–	12,339	2,419	383	571	–	575	886	39,565
Vancouver Quadra	BC	Lib	Lib	20,364	39.46%	8,919	17.28%	Ref	%	20,364	11,445	9,002	–	5,552	3,331	376	594	208	190	549	51,611
Vancouver South	BC	PC	Lib	17,215	35.61%	4,923	10.18%	Ref	%	17,215	12,292	11,359	–	3,625	2,113	287	418	–	427	601	48,337
Victoria	BC	NDP	Lib	21,557	37.21%	5,579	9.63%	Ref	%	21,557	15,978	6,049	–	8,182	4,072	505	1,135	–	215	244	57,937
Brandon—Souris	MB	PC	Lib	12,130	33.00%	967	2.63%	Ref	%	12,130	11,163	8,236	–	4,359	336	112	–	339	–	82	36,757
Churchill	MB	NDP	Lib	9,658	40.73%	907	3.83%	NDP	%	9,658	2,275	2,438	–	8,751	590	–	–	–	–	–	23,712
Dauphin—Swan River	MB	PC	Lib	10,600	31.73%	735	2.20%	Ref	%	10,600	9,865	5,267	–	7,412	–	–	–	–	–	260	33,404
Lisgar—Marquette	MB	PC	Ref	13,385	41.02%	4,653	14.26%	Lib	%	8,732	13,385	7,833	–	1,808	355	–	–	399	–	115	32,627
Portage—Interlake	MB	PC	Lib	14,506	40.68%	4,705	13.19%	Ref	%	14,506	9,801	7,036	–	3,029	935	179	–	–	–	175	35,661
Provencher	MB	PC	Lib	16,119	44.04%	2,656	7.26%	Ref	%	16,119	13,463	3,765	–	1,818	1,212	157	–	–	–	69	36,603
Selkirk—Red River	MB	PC	Lib	16,003	32.88%	3,488	7.17%	NDP	%	16,003	12,412	5,687	–	12,515	1,402	179	–	400	–	79	48,677
Saint Boniface	MB	Lib	Lib	30,042	63.36%	22,082	46.57%	Ref	%	30,042	7,960	3,404	–	3,364	2,008	251	–	–	–	388	47,417
Winnipeg North	MB	Lib	Lib	22,220	51.27%	8,480	19.57%	NDP	%	22,220	4,150	2,001	–	13,740	772	212	–	–	110	135	43,340
Winnipeg North Centre	MB	Lib	Lib	13,905	50.17%	4,972	17.94%	NDP	%	13,905	2,275	1,307	–	8,933	908	176	–	–	117	97	27,718
Winnipeg South	MB	PC	Lib	25,950	49.60%	11,128	21.27%	Ref	%	25,950	14,822	6,432	–	2,180	2,512	197	–	–	113	112	52,318
Winnipeg South Centre	MB	Lib	Lib	25,881	61.44%	20,593	48.88%	Ref	%	25,881	5,288	3,903	–	3,512	3,099	225	–	–	76	143	42,127
Winnipeg St. James	MB	Lib	Lib	21,613	54.95%	13,367	33.99%	Ref	%	21,613	8,246	5,094	–	2,596	1,487	155	–	–	58	83	39,332
Winnipeg—Transcona	MB	NDP	NDP	16,074	38.86%	219	0.53%	Lib	%	15,855	5,829	2,112	–	16,074	900	150	–	362	–	81	41,363
Acadie—Bathurst	NB	Lib	Lib	26,843	66.41%	15,681	38.80%	PC	%	26,843	–	11,162	–	2,413	–	–	–	–	–	–	40,418
Beauséjour	NB	Lib	Lib	30,117	76.15%	24,113	60.97%	PC	%	30,117 (Note: Fernand Robichaud was previously elected as MP in 1988, but stepped aside in 1990 to allow Jean Chrétien to take office upon becoming the new leader of the Liberals.)	–	6,004	–	2,246	740	–	–	443	–	–	39,550
Carleton—Charlotte	NB	PC	Lib	13,970	43.11%	811	2.50%	PC	%	13,970	3,831	13,159	–	1,016	431	–	–	–	–	–	32,407
Fredericton—York—Sunbury	NB	PC	Lib	21,771	46.62%	8,152	17.45%	PC	%	21,771	7,985	13,619	–	2,348	–	383	–	–	226	371	46,703
Fundy—Royal	NB	PC	Lib	21,777	46.49%	8,503	18.15%	PC	%	21,777	8,283	13,274	–	2,254	–	–	–	–	1,256	–	46,844
Madawaska—Victoria	NB	PC	Lib	16,059	48.80%	1,017	3.09%	PC	%	16,059	955	15,042	–	854	–	–	–	–	–	–	32,910
Miramichi	NB	Lib	Lib	18,839	61.13%	11,803	38.30%	PC	%	18,839	3,063	7,036	–	1,570	–	–	–	–	–	309	30,817
Moncton	NB	Lib	Lib	33,654	66.30%	26,403	52.02%	PC	%	33,654	6,310	7,251	–	2,500	–	491	–	553	–	–	50,759
Restigouche—Chaleur	NB	Lib	Lib	21,004	70.53%	15,091	50.67%	PC	%	21,004	–	5,913	–	2,060	–	804	–	–	–	–	29,781
Saint John	NB	PC	PC	15,123	43.32%	3,388	9.70%	Lib	%	11,735	2,201	15,123	–	1,433	146	226	–	–	3,687	359	34,910
Bonavista—Trinity—Conception	NL	Lib	Lib	26,230	74.77%	18,751	53.45%	PC	%	26,230	–	7,479	–	1,003	–	370	–	–	–	–	35,082
Burin—St. George's	NL	Lib	Lib	24,912	80.30%	19,977	64.40%	PC	%	24,912	–	4,935	–	757	–	418	–	–	–	–	31,022
Gander—Grand Falls	NL	Lib	Lib	24,202	78.08%	18,139	58.52%	PC	%	24,202	–	6,063	–	530	–	200	–	–	–	–	30,995
Humber—St. Barbe—Baie Verte	NL	Lib	Lib	26,879	82.21%	21,719	66.43%	PC	%	26,879	–	5,160	–	658	–	–	–	–	–	–	32,697
Labrador	NL	Lib	Lib	8,721	77.14%	6,580	58.20%	PC	%	8,721	–	2,141	–	443	–	–	–	–	–	–	11,305
St. John's East	NL	PC	Lib	20,270	44.20%	950	2.07%	PC	%	20,270	1,362	19,320	–	2,937	1,235	389	–	349	–	–	45,862
St. John's West	NL	PC	Lib	24,023	55.06%	7,633	17.50%	PC	%	24,023	1,030	16,390	–	1,752	–	432	–	–	–	–	43,627
Annapolis Valley—Hants	NS	PC	Lib	18,238	39.44%	8,832	19.10%	PC	%	18,238	5,919	9,406	–	2,308	484	319	–	614	8,958	–	46,246
Cape Breton Highlands—Canso	NS	Lib	Lib	22,719	64.40%	14,841	42.07%	PC	%	22,719	2,971	7,878	–	1,375	–	337	–	–	–	–	35,280
Cape Breton—East Richmond	NS	Lib	Lib	24,997	78.34%	22,241	69.70%	PC	%	24,997	1,761	2,756	–	1,778	447	171	–	–	–	–	31,910
Cape Breton—The Sydneys	NS	Lib	Lib	25,188	75.79%	21,457	64.57%	PC	%	25,188	1,907	3,731	–	2,126	–	280	–	–	–	–	33,232
Central Nova	NS	PC	Lib	16,329	43.52%	4,255	11.34%	PC	%	16,329	5,897	12,074	–	2,446	512	266	–	–	–	–	37,524
Cumberland—Colchester	NS	PC	Lib	18,241	42.58%	2,582	6.03%	PC	%	18,241	5,638	15,659	–	2,393	–	311	–	602	–	–	42,844
Dartmouth	NS	Lib	Lib	23,461	50.81%	12,619	27.33%	PC	%	23,461	7,242	10,842	–	3,301	810	516	–	–	–	–	46,172
Halifax	NS	Lib	Lib	21,326	45.91%	11,726	25.24%	PC	%	21,326	6,717	9,600	–	6,214	1,383	448	307	–	376	84	46,455
Halifax West	NS	PC	Lib	27,089	46.00%	13,273	22.54%	PC	%	27,089	11,433	13,816	–	5,009	1,070	472	–	–	–	–	58,889
South Shore	NS	PC	Lib	17,351	46.94%	5,291	14.31%	PC	%	17,351	4,999	12,060	–	1,847	421	287	–	–	–	–	36,965
South West Nova	NS	Lib	Lib	20,745	54.77%	12,156	32.09%	PC	%	20,745	5,893	8,589	–	2,110	–	540	–	–	–	–	37,877
Algoma	ON	Lib	Lib	18,218	58.05%	11,595	36.94%	Ref	%	18,218	6,623	3,613	–	2,696	–	235	–	–	–	–	31,385
Beaches—Woodbine	ON	NDP	Lib	17,639	40.73%	9,602	22.17%	NDP	%	17,639	6,844	4,316	–	8,037	1,139	265	335	–	4,615	116	43,306
Bramalea—Gore—Malton	ON	PC	Lib	17,675	43.26%	5,779	14.14%	Ref	%	17,675	11,896	7,856	–	2,064	500	287	224	–	274	82	40,858
Brampton	ON	PC	Lib	35,203	51.65%	17,007	24.95%	Ref	%	35,203	18,196	12,134	–	1,925	–	455	–	–	–	245	68,158
Brant	ON	NDP	Lib	24,686	51.46%	12,823	26.73%	Ref	%	24,686	11,863	5,831	–	3,317	1,227	192	482	–	112	258	47,968
Broadview—Greenwood	ON	Lib	Lib	23,558	61.07%	18,177	47.12%	NDP	%	23,558	4,356	3,601	–	5,381	976	389	–	–	148	166	38,575
Bruce—Grey	ON	PC	Lib	25,689	49.07%	12,751	24.36%	Ref	%	25,689	12,938	9,835	–	2,259	1,001	160	323	–	–	144	52,349
Burlington	ON	PC	Lib	22,880	44.26%	9,303	17.99%	PC	%	22,880	12,035	13,577	–	1,511	537	301	–	–	859	–	51,700
Cambridge	ON	PC	Lib	22,121	39.26%	3,231	5.73%	Ref	%	22,121	18,890	9,773	–	2,980	1,802	372	–	407	–	–	56,345
Carleton—Gloucester	ON	Lib	Lib	46,830	61.60%	34,388	45.23%	Ref	%	46,830	12,442	11,930	–	2,795	839	498	390	236	–	65	76,025
Cochrane—Superior	ON	Lib	Lib	19,511	72.23%	16,921	62.64%	Ref	%	19,511	2,590	2,470	–	2,441	–	–	–	–	–	–	27,012
Davenport	ON	Lib	Lib	20,217	73.78%	17,704	64.61%	NDP	%	20,217	2,139	1,255	–	2,513	459	265	254	–	–	300	27,402
Don Valley East	ON	PC	Lib	21,630	53.70%	12,296	30.53%	PC	%	21,630	6,819	9,334	–	1,540	403	206	–	–	–	349	40,281
Don Valley North	ON	PC	Lib	22,504	59.86%	15,266	40.61%	PC	%	22,504	6,068	7,238	–	1,395	–	319	–	–	–	69	37,593
Don Valley West	ON	PC	Lib	25,874	49.77%	10,763	20.71%	PC	%	25,874	7,921	15,111	–	1,405	1,008	252	303	–	83	25	51,982
Durham	ON	PC	Lib	22,383	36.76%	3,840	6.31%	Ref	%	22,383	18,543	14,940	–	2,529	1,169	271	350	707	–	–	60,892
Eglinton—Lawrence	ON	Lib	Lib	28,634	71.62%	24,287	60.75%	Ref	%	28,634	4,347	4,262	–	2,091	–	384	–	–	–	262	39,980
Elgin—Norfolk	ON	PC	Lib	17,439	43.05%	6,310	15.58%	PC	%	17,439	8,302	11,129	–	2,164	–	242	–	1,183	–	51	40,510
Erie	ON	PC	Lib	19,802	48.70%	8,049	19.79%	Ref	%	19,802	11,753	5,894	–	1,842	586	197	–	591	–	–	40,665
Essex-Kent	ON	Lib	Lib	21,974	62.14%	15,562	44.01%	Ref	%	21,974	6,412	4,751	–	2,000	–	226	–	–	–	–	35,363
Essex-Windsor	ON	NDP	Lib	25,211	55.14%	12,556	27.46%	NDP	%	25,211	6,029	1,484	–	12,655	196	–	–	–	–	150	45,725
Etobicoke Centre	ON	PC	Lib	25,739	54.35%	15,254	32.21%	Ref	%	25,739	10,485	9,242	–	1,039	499	202	–	–	–	154	47,360
Etobicoke North	ON	Lib	Lib	28,119	61.24%	18,561	40.42%	Ref	%	28,119	9,558	4,936	–	1,849	661	253	–	–	105	438	45,919
Etobicoke—Lakeshore	ON	PC	Lib	19,458	42.11%	5,152	11.15%	PC	%	19,458	8,673	14,306	–	2,316	871	284	–	–	–	303	46,211
Glengarry—Prescott—Russell	ON	Lib	Lib	44,775	80.22%	40,189	72.00%	PC	%	44,775	4,458	4,586	–	1,295	–	456	–	–	–	245	55,815
Guelph—Wellington	ON	PC	Lib	24,359	39.24%	8,876	14.30%	Ref	%	24,359	15,483	12,825	–	2,904	2,018	255	318	–	3,543 (Note: Frank Maine, previously elected as a Liberal MP (1974-1979) received 3,465 votes.)	375	62,080
Haldimand—Norfolk	ON	Lib	Lib	24,200	53.82%	13,639	30.33%	Ref	%	24,200	10,561	7,300	–	1,657	1,248	–	–	–	–	–	44,966
Halton—Peel	ON	PC	Lib	22,278	37.00%	3,928	6.52%	PC	%	22,278	16,826	18,350	–	1,458	564	–	–	307	–	420	60,203
Hamilton East	ON	Lib	Lib	22,999	67.30%	17,185	50.29%	Ref	%	22,999	5,814	2,324	–	2,262	425	–	–	–	228	123	34,175
Hamilton Mountain	ON	Lib	Lib	27,221	57.30%	16,897	35.57%	Ref	%	27,221	10,324	5,460	–	3,626	547	331	–	–	–	–	47,509
Hamilton West	ON	Lib	Lib	22,592	58.65%	16,735	43.45%	Ref	%	22,592	5,857	5,789	–	3,143	606	396	–	–	134	–	38,517
Hamilton—Wentworth	ON	PC	Lib	29,695	45.81%	13,150	20.29%	Ref	%	29,695	16,545	14,539	–	2,555	672	353	–	460	–	–	64,819
Hastings—Frontenac—Lennox and Addington	ON	PC	Lib	24,082	50.10%	13,119	27.29%	PC	%	24,082	8,851	10,963	–	2,012	997	–	–	–	1,165	–	48,070
Huron—Bruce	ON	PC	Lib	21,845	44.11%	7,993	16.14%	PC	%	21,845	10,464	13,852	–	2,064	–	243	–	782	–	272	49,522
Kenora—Rainy River	ON	Lib	Lib	22,409	64.84%	15,300	44.27%	Ref	%	22,409	7,109	2,072	–	2,194	608	–	–	–	167	–	34,559
Kent	ON	Lib	Lib	23,177	63.78%	17,559	48.32%	Ref	%	23,177	5,618	5,015	–	1,368	1,014	146	–	–	–	–	36,338
Kingston and the Islands	ON	Lib	Lib	32,372	56.46%	21,437	37.39%	PC	%	32,372	7,175	10,935	–	4,051	1,768	376	–	663	–	–	57,340
Kitchener	ON	PC	Lib	26,616	50.51%	14,402	27.33%	Ref	%	26,616	12,214	10,413	–	2,373	–	438	–	475	–	165	52,694
Lambton—Middlesex	ON	Lib	Lib	20,314	48.63%	10,913	26.12%	PC	%	20,314	8,101	9,401	–	1,508	438	169	–	1,600	245	–	41,776
Lanark—Carleton	ON	PC	Lib	34,988	49.40%	18,265	25.79%	PC	%	34,988	15,743	16,723	–	1,697	921	262	333	–	–	166	70,833
Leeds—Grenville	ON	Lib	Lib	26,567	52.57%	12,959	25.64%	PC	%	26,567	8,071	13,608	–	1,026	474	196	538	–	–	59	50,539
Lincoln	ON	PC	Lib	29,048	52.19%	14,723	26.45%	Ref	%	29,048	14,325	8,731	–	2,182	935	307	–	–	128	–	55,656
London East	ON	Lib	Lib	28,279	55.83%	19,042	37.59%	PC	%	28,279	8,704	9,237	–	2,614	830	282	567	–	–	139	50,652
London West	ON	PC	Lib	31,085	48.31%	15,919	24.74%	PC	%	31,085	12,900	15,166	–	2,547	1,220	385	403	310	113	210	64,339
London—Middlesex	ON	PC	Lib	27,232	53.87%	17,406	34.43%	Ref	%	27,232	9,826	9,126	–	2,658	563	228	238	521	–	161	50,553
Markham—Whitchurch-Stouffville	ON	PC	Lib	35,909	46.50%	16,214	21.00%	PC	%	35,909	17,937	19,695	–	1,692	973	469	–	–	458	85	77,218
Mississauga East	ON	Lib	Lib	32,167	63.84%	22,694	45.04%	Ref	%	32,167	9,473	6,427	–	1,382	393	323	–	–	148	73	50,386
Mississauga South	ON	PC	Lib	21,478	46.59%	9,886	21.44%	Ref	%	21,478	11,592	10,763	–	981	452	234	–	–	124	478	46,102
Mississauga West	ON	PC	Lib	53,567	55.87%	33,349	34.78%	Ref	%	53,567	20,218	18,607	–	2,219	–	487	498	–	–	283	95,879
Nepean	ON	Lib	Lib	36,208	59.64%	25,404	41.85%	PC	%	36,208	9,798	10,804	–	2,078	880	263	455	–	–	220	60,706
Niagara Falls	ON	PC	Lib	20,567	47.10%	9,672	22.15%	Ref	%	20,567	10,895	9,707	–	1,470	511	169	263	–	–	82	43,664
Nickel Belt	ON	NDP	Lib	25,237	57.19%	15,040	34.08%	NDP	%	25,237	5,604	2,395	–	10,197	346	173	–	–	122	53	44,127
Nipissing	ON	Lib	Lib	25,403	62.81%	18,583	45.95%	Ref	%	25,403	6,820	6,608	–	1,322	–	220	–	–	–	73	40,446
Northumberland	ON	Lib	Lib	23,986	49.54%	12,474	25.77%	Ref	%	23,986	11,512	10,199	–	1,667	292	248	–	347	–	162	48,413
Oakville—Milton	ON	PC	Lib	34,124	46.56%	14,927	20.37%	PC	%	34,124	17,347	19,197	–	1,643	–	544	–	–	430	–	73,285
Ontario	ON	PC	Lib	38,680	43.35%	10,583	11.86%	Ref	%	38,680	28,097	16,872	–	2,746	869	352	402	–	692	521	89,231
Oshawa	ON	NDP	Lib	15,651	38.27%	3,825	9.35%	Ref	%	15,651	11,826	6,140	–	6,102	391	263	–	386	–	134	40,893
Ottawa Centre	ON	Lib	Lib	25,962	51.91%	14,724	29.44%	NDP	%	25,962	4,700	6,126	–	11,238	796	352	595	–	75	165	50,009
Ottawa South	ON	Lib	Lib	36,485	65.93%	28,482	51.47%	Ref	%	36,485	8,003	6,971	–	2,169	1,038	251	358	–	–	63	55,338
Ottawa West	ON	Lib	Lib	28,422	63.36%	22,035	49.12%	Ref	%	28,422	6,387	6,344	–	1,836	1,082	215	340	–	–	230	44,856
Ottawa—Vanier	ON	Lib	Lib	34,224	70.47%	29,108	59.94%	PC	%	34,224	3,830	5,116	–	3,155	532	438	652	–	445	172	48,564
Oxford	ON	PC	Lib	19,669	41.13%	7,016	14.67%	Ref	%	19,669	12,653	10,857	–	2,380	417	214	–	935	471	230	47,826
Parkdale—High Park	ON	Lib	Lib	22,358	54.36%	15,711	38.20%	Ref	%	22,358	6,647	5,668	–	3,855	1,320	371	430	–	105	377	41,131
Parry Sound—Muskoka	ON	PC	Lib	20,427	44.22%	7,405	16.03%	Ref	%	20,427	13,022	9,529	–	2,164	581	263	–	–	181	26	46,193
Perth—Wellington—Waterloo	ON	PC	Lib	20,125	43.26%	7,940	17.07%	Ref	%	20,125	12,185	10,835	–	1,909	486	184	–	647	–	152	46,523
Peterborough	ON	PC	Lib	27,575	47.60%	14,118	24.37%	Ref	%	27,575	13,457	11,623	–	3,056	1,852	367	–	–	–	–	57,930
Prince Edward—Hastings	ON	Lib	Lib	26,483	57.08%	17,465	37.64%	Ref	%	26,483	9,018	8,246	–	1,275	640	171	–	561	–	–	46,394
Renfrew—Nipissing—Pembroke	ON	Lib	Lib	25,725	50.55%	15,437	30.33%	Ind	%	25,725	6,204	7,038	–	1,351	–	144	–	–	10,288 (Note: Hec Clouthier's nomination as the Liberal candidate was blocked by Jean Chrétien, owing to Len Hopkins having represented the riding for the previous 25 years.)	145	50,895
Rosedale	ON	PC	Lib	27,707	49.98%	15,689	28.30%	PC	%	27,707	7,048	12,018	–	5,937	1,091	839	479	–	214	104	55,437
Sarnia—Lambton	ON	PC	Lib	20,331	47.57%	10,666	24.95%	PC	%	20,331	9,055	9,665	–	2,649	–	178	–	610	255	–	42,743
Sault Ste. Marie	ON	NDP	Lib	21,427	52.96%	12,457	30.79%	NDP	%	21,427	6,576	3,143	–	8,970	188	155	–	–	–	–	40,459
Scarborough Centre	ON	PC	Lib	21,084	52.50%	12,669	31.55%	Ref	%	21,084	8,415	8,154	–	1,599	320	190	–	–	184	212	40,158
Scarborough East	ON	PC	Lib	20,041	50.48%	9,740	24.53%	Ref	%	20,041	10,301	6,598	–	1,524	373	195	250	–	–	422	39,704
Scarborough West	ON	Lib	Lib	21,335	54.44%	13,021	33.23%	Ref	%	21,335	8,314	5,664	–	2,771	578	212	276	–	–	40	39,190
Scarborough—Agincourt	ON	Lib	Lib	24,710	59.72%	15,908	38.45%	PC	%	24,710	6,022	8,802	–	942	273	201	–	–	329	94	41,373
Scarborough—Rouge River	ON	Lib	Lib	33,867	66.14%	25,271	49.35%	Ref	%	33,867	8,596	6,014	–	1,425	286	233	–	–	368	419	51,208
Simcoe Centre	ON	PC	Ref	25,446	37.91%	182	0.27%	Lib	%	25,264	25,446	11,644	–	1,872	1,345	307	–	409	794	41	67,122
Simcoe North	ON	PC	Lib	23,116	40.61%	5,618	9.87%	Ref	%	23,116	17,498	13,141	–	1,956	845	300	–	–	–	67	56,923
St. Catharines	ON	PC	Lib	23,928	48.99%	9,917	20.31%	Ref	%	23,928	14,011	7,448	–	2,799	–	–	–	568	–	86	48,840
St. Paul's	ON	PC	Lib	27,775	54.30%	15,276	29.86%	PC	%	27,775	5,727	12,499	–	2,641	1,259	313	481	–	245	211	51,151
Stormont—Dundas	ON	Lib	Lib	27,080	63.40%	19,582	45.84%	PC	%	27,080	5,901	7,498	–	1,153	579	424	–	–	–	79	42,714
Sudbury	ON	Lib	Lib	27,951	66.08%	22,163	52.40%	Ref	%	27,951	5,788	3,679	–	3,675	512	202	–	–	405	86	42,298
Thunder Bay—Atikokan	ON	NDP	Lib	19,801	57.26%	13,236	38.28%	NDP	%	19,801	5,378	2,836	–	6,565	–	–	–	–	–	–	34,580
Thunder Bay—Nipigon	ON	Lib	Lib	24,277	65.05%	18,702	50.11%	Ref	%	24,277	5,575	3,575	–	3,372	439	–	–	–	–	81	37,319
Timiskaming—French River	ON	PC	Lib	17,457	59.79%	12,947	44.34%	PC	%	17,457	3,870	4,510	–	2,582	–	296	–	–	483	–	29,198
Timmins—Chapleau	ON	NDP	Lib	17,085	55.47%	8,866	28.79%	NDP	%	17,085	–	4,370	–	8,219	443	394	–	–	289	–	30,800
Trinity—Spadina	ON	NDP	Lib	20,472	50.95%	9,500	23.65%	NDP	%	20,472	3,143	3,242	–	10,972	912	398	613	–	–	425	40,177
Victoria—Haliburton	ON	PC	Lib	20,511	36.74%	4,605	8.25%	Ref	%	20,511	15,906	12,378	–	2,046	622	200	–	407	3,584	178	55,832
Waterloo	ON	PC	Lib	26,269	42.14%	10,353	16.61%	Ref	%	26,269	15,916	15,109	–	2,822	–	449	–	942	332	493	62,332
Welland—St. Catharines—Thorold	ON	Lib	Lib	25,533	53.98%	13,632	28.82%	Ref	%	25,533	11,901	5,465	–	3,736	–	310	295	–	–	64	47,304
Wellington—Grey—Dufferin—Simcoe	ON	PC	Lib	20,415	35.80%	1,770	3.10%	PC	%	20,415	15,400	18,645	–	2,000	–	–	563	–	–	–	57,023
Willowdale	ON	Lib	Lib	28,622	61.26%	20,779	44.48%	PC	%	28,622	7,108	7,843	–	1,687	681	249	285	–	203	42	46,720
Windsor West	ON	Lib	Lib	28,347	72.77%	23,920	61.41%	Ref	%	28,347	4,427	1,783	–	3,579	–	141	406	–	139	132	38,954
Windsor—St. Clair	ON	NDP	Lib	22,960	55.60%	13,939	33.76%	NDP	%	22,960	4,164	4,577	–	9,021	–	154	304	–	–	114	41,294
York Centre	ON	Lib	Lib	27,128	69.65%	23,175	59.50%	Ind	%	27,128	2,140	2,684	–	1,559	737	236	210	–	3,953 (Note: Peter Li Preti had sought the Liberal nomination for the constituency, but Jean Chrétien directly appointed Art Eggleton to run instead.)	304	38,951
York North	ON	Lib	Lib	71,535	63.30%	51,389	45.47%	Ref	%	71,535	20,146	15,484	–	3,006	1,247	679	–	–	–	915	113,012
York South—Weston	ON	Lib	Lib	25,150	70.12%	19,837	55.31%	Ref	%	25,150	5,313	2,508	–	1,971	–	276	–	–	140	509	35,867
York West	ON	Lib	Lib	25,396	79.83%	22,011	69.19%	Ref	%	25,396	3,385	1,506	–	1,074	–	209	–	–	–	243	31,813
York—Simcoe	ON	PC	Lib	26,932	38.92%	4,627	6.69%	Ref	%	26,932	22,305	16,114	–	1,709	675	406	–	956	–	95	69,192
Cardigan	PE	Lib	Lib	10,170	61.67%	4,782	29.00%	PC	%	10,170	–	5,388	–	934	–	–	–	–	–	–	16,492
Egmont	PE	Lib	Lib	10,687	57.61%	3,717	20.04%	PC	%	10,687	–	6,970	–	893	–	–	–	–	–	–	18,550
Hillsborough	PE	Lib	Lib	11,976	60.57%	6,707	33.92%	PC	%	11,976	744	5,269	–	1,143	350	123	–	167	–	–	19,772
Malpeque	PE	Lib	Lib	10,579	60.77%	5,080	29.18%	PC	%	10,579	–	5,499	–	761	–	–	249	320	–	–	17,408
Abitibi	QC	PC	BQ	19,076	46.22%	4,525	10.96%	PC	%	6,696	–	14,551	19,076	951	–	–	–	–	–	–	41,274
Ahuntsic	QC	PC	BQ	22,686	45.06%	1,658	3.29%	Lib	%	21,028	–	4,442	22,686	676	–	476	–	–	551	486	50,345
Anjou—Rivière-des-Prairies	QC	PC	BQ	26,163	43.10%	532	0.88%	Lib	%	25,631	–	7,066	26,163	958	–	747	–	–	–	139	60,704
Argenteuil—Papineau	QC	PC	BQ	23,360	47.25%	9,126	18.46%	Lib	%	14,234	–	10,959	23,360	888	–	–	–	–	–	–	49,441
Beauce	QC	PC	Ind	20,343	40.45%	2,142	4.26%	BQ	%	7,273	–	4,108	18,201	365	–	–	–	–	20,343	–	50,290
Beauharnois—Salaberry	QC	PC	BQ	25,873	51.40%	9,998	19.86%	Lib	%	15,875	–	7,602	25,873	987	–	–	–	–	–	–	50,337
Beauport—Montmorency—Orléans	QC	PC	BQ	31,671	57.72%	18,984	34.60%	PC	%	7,899	–	12,687	31,671	1,174	–	1,138	–	–	–	297	54,866
Bellechasse	QC	PC	BQ	16,981	40.65%	1,150	2.75%	PC	%	8,361	–	15,831	16,981	601	–	–	–	–	–	–	41,774
Berthier—Montcalm	QC	PC	BQ	35,952	60.88%	19,789	33.51%	Lib	%	16,163	–	5,271	35,952	593	272	803	–	–	–	–	59,054
Blainville—Deux-Montagnes	QC	PC	BQ	48,214	59.41%	29,484	36.33%	Lib	%	18,730	–	11,840	48,214	858	–	1,010	–	–	–	502	81,154
Bonaventure—Îles-de-la-Madeleine	QC	PC	Lib	12,007	43.59%	2,770	10.06%	BQ	%	12,007	–	5,929	9,237	370	–	–	–	–	–	–	27,543
Bourassa	QC	PC	BQ	18,238	41.99%	53	0.12%	Lib	%	18,185	–	5,194	18,238	1,026	–	480	–	–	–	308	43,431
Brome—Missisquoi	QC	PC	BQ	17,836	40.76%	1,796	4.10%	Lib	%	16,040	–	7,504	17,836	553	156	563	–	–	380	722	43,754
Chambly (Note: Riding had been won by the NDP candidate Phil Edmonston in a 1990 byelection)	QC	PC	BQ	36,485	59.69%	18,682	30.57%	Lib	%	17,803	–	4,760	36,485	1,796	–	–	–	–	–	277	61,121
Champlain	QC	PC	BQ	23,650	48.83%	10,567	21.82%	PC	%	11,254	–	13,083	23,650	449	–	–	–	–	–	–	48,436
Charlesbourg	QC	PC	BQ	38,565	59.37%	23,385	36.00%	Lib	%	15,180	–	8,150	38,565	1,258	–	1,487	–	–	–	318	64,958
Charlevoix	QC	PC	BQ	23,617	61.97%	16,457	43.18%	Lib	%	7,160	–	6,800	23,617	533	–	–	–	–	–	–	38,110
Châteauguay	QC	PC	BQ	34,652	58.01%	16,531	27.68%	Lib	%	18,121	–	5,782	34,652	858	–	–	–	–	–	317	59,730
Chicoutimi	QC	PC	BQ	29,511	63.90%	18,385	39.81%	PC	%	5,000	–	11,126	29,511	548	–	–	–	–	–	–	46,185
Drummond	QC	PC	BQ	24,923	54.87%	13,999	30.82%	Lib	%	10,924	–	8,971	24,923	605	–	–	–	–	–	–	45,423
Frontenac	QC	PC	BQ	19,428	58.42%	11,963	35.97%	Lib	%	7,465	–	5,431	19,428	345	–	–	379	–	–	210	33,258
Gaspé	QC	PC	BQ	13,224	45.17%	3,096	10.57%	Lib	%	10,128	–	5,425	13,224	209	–	–	291	–	–	–	29,277
Gatineau—La Lièvre	QC	Lib	Lib	39,283	55.49%	14,271	20.16%	BQ	%	39,283	–	4,478	25,012	1,099	–	737	–	–	–	189	70,798
Hochelaga—Maisonneuve	QC	PC	BQ	26,170	61.37%	15,495	36.33%	Lib	%	10,675	–	3,723	26,170	1,050	–	588	–	–	–	439	42,645
Hull—Aylmer	QC	Lib	Lib	27,988	53.26%	13,695	26.06%	BQ	%	27,988	–	3,244	14,293	1,346	–	401	468	–	4,583	225	52,548
Joliette	QC	PC	BQ	41,061	66.25%	30,953	49.94%	Lib	%	10,108	–	8,784	41,061	745	–	1,285	–	–	–	–	61,983
Jonquière	QC	PC	BQ	25,129	67.63%	18,484	49.74%	PC	%	4,528	–	6,645	25,129	413	–	444	–	–	–	–	37,159
Kamouraska—Rivière-du-Loup	QC	PC	BQ	18,510	52.86%	10,459	29.87%	PC	%	7,476	–	8,051	18,510	440	–	–	–	–	537	–	35,014
La Prairie	QC	PC	BQ	27,490	43.05%	476	0.75%	Lib	%	27,014	–	7,750	27,490	708	–	699	–	–	–	199	63,860
Lac-Saint-Jean	QC	PC	BQ	27,258	75.56%	22,086	61.22%	Lib	%	5,172	–	3,201	27,258	443	–	–	–	–	–	–	36,074
Lachine—Lac-Saint-Louis	QC	PC	Lib	39,732	67.45%	27,718	47.06%	BQ	%	39,732	–	4,717	12,014	822	–	559	–	–	618	441	58,903
LaSalle—Émard	QC	Lib	Lib	30,869	59.51%	13,590	26.20%	BQ	%	30,869	–	2,378	17,279	707	–	418	–	–	–	223	51,874
Laurentides	QC	PC	BQ	41,822	60.68%	23,171	33.62%	Lib	%	18,651	–	7,169	41,822	820	–	–	–	–	–	464	68,926
Laurier—Sainte-Marie	QC	Lib	BQ	25,060	61.79%	15,120	37.28%	Lib	%	9,940	–	2,156	25,060 (Note: Gilles Duceppe had been elected as an Independent in a 1990 byelection.)	1,237	–	652	1,050	–	131	332	40,558
Laval Centre	QC	PC	BQ	31,462	55.19%	12,431	21.81%	Lib	%	19,031	–	4,548	31,462	640	252	675	–	–	–	395	57,003
Laval East	QC	PC	BQ	31,491	51.94%	15,221	25.11%	Lib	%	16,270	–	11,131	31,491	662	–	587	–	–	–	488	60,629
Laval West	QC	PC	Lib	28,449	46.24%	1,989	3.23%	BQ	%	28,449	–	4,167	26,460	678	280	546	–	–	–	945	61,525
Lévis	QC	PC	BQ	40,487	61.52%	26,203	39.82%	Lib	%	14,284	–	9,185	40,487	1,186	–	–	–	–	–	667	65,809
Longueuil	QC	PC	BQ	38,892	65.97%	24,640	41.79%	Lib	%	14,252	–	4,561	38,892	999	–	–	–	–	–	251	58,955
Lotbinière	QC	PC	BQ	26,956	53.78%	12,068	24.07%	Lib	%	14,888	–	7,576	26,956	707	–	–	–	–	–	–	50,127
Louis-Hébert	QC	PC	BQ	33,879	55.68%	18,206	29.92%	Lib	%	15,673	–	9,313	33,879	784	–	882	–	–	–	313	60,844
Manicouagan	QC	PC	BQ	14,859	54.98%	8,847	32.73%	PC	%	5,706	–	6,012	14,859	451	–	–	–	–	–	–	27,028
Matapédia—Matane	QC	PC	BQ	18,331	57.33%	7,921	24.77%	Lib	%	10,410	–	2,448	18,331	218	–	570	–	–	–	–	31,977
Mégantic—Compton—Stanstead	QC	PC	BQ	17,214	44.72%	3,612	9.38%	Lib	%	13,602	–	6,026	17,214	494	197	750	–	–	–	212	38,495
Mercier	QC	PC	BQ	34,678	58.89%	22,866	38.83%	Lib	%	11,812	–	2,449	34,678	682	–	–	–	–	8,930	334	58,885
Mount Royal	QC	Lib	Lib	39,598	82.94%	36,274	75.98%	BQ	%	39,598	–	2,758	3,324	796	300	312	–	–	537	118	47,743
Notre-Dame-de-Grâce	QC	Lib	Lib	28,646	70.72%	22,913	56.56%	BQ	%	28,646	–	2,618	5,733	1,416	661	425	–	–	673	336	40,508
Outremont	QC	PC	Lib	21,697	47.05%	4,439	9.63%	BQ	%	21,697	–	4,011	17,258	2,055	–	695	–	–	–	399	46,115
Papineau—Saint-Michel	QC	Lib	Lib	20,064	51.98%	4,916	12.74%	BQ	%	20,064	–	1,686	15,148	708	–	678	–	–	–	317	38,601
Pierrefonds—Dollard	QC	PC	Lib	39,974	64.98%	29,262	47.57%	BQ	%	39,974	–	8,106	10,712	864	474	480	–	–	386	518	61,514
Pontiac—Gatineau—Labelle	QC	PC	Lib	17,313	40.27%	2,826	6.57%	BQ	%	17,313	–	9,408	14,487	674	716	–	–	–	399	–	42,997
Portneuf	QC	PC	BQ	24,065	53.63%	13,683	30.49%	Lib	%	10,382	–	6,632	24,065	636	–	875	–	–	2,281	–	44,871
Québec	QC	PC	BQ	27,788	53.83%	13,833	26.80%	Lib	%	13,955	–	7,052	27,788	1,027	–	853	786	–	–	159	51,620
Québec-Est	QC	PC	BQ	34,594	59.59%	20,443	35.22%	Lib	%	14,151	–	6,553	34,594	971	289	1,122	–	–	–	371	58,051
Richelieu	QC	PC	BQ	31,558	66.52%	20,625	43.48%	Lib	%	10,933	–	4,455	31,558	337	–	–	–	–	–	157	47,440
Richmond—Wolfe	QC	PC	BQ	22,235	52.25%	12,231	28.74%	PC	%	9,159	–	10,004	22,235	479	–	676	–	–	–	–	42,553
Rimouski—Témiscouata	QC	PC	BQ	23,016	59.87%	13,541	35.22%	Lib	%	9,475	–	4,619	23,016	335	–	400	–	–	599	–	38,444
Roberval	QC	PC	BQ	20,109	59.96%	13,246	39.50%	Lib	%	6,863	–	6,065	20,109	500	–	–	–	–	–	–	33,537
Rosemont	QC	PC	BQ	29,414	62.95%	16,588	35.50%	Lib	%	12,826	–	2,519	29,414	1,037	–	646	–	–	–	282	46,724
Saint-Denis	QC	Lib	Lib	21,883	52.41%	6,609	15.83%	BQ	%	21,883	–	2,196	15,274	969	–	400	–	–	423	612	41,757
Saint-Henri—Westmount	QC	Lib	Lib	25,940	61.72%	17,990	42.80%	BQ	%	25,940	–	4,507	7,950	1,662	581	558	–	125	381	325	42,029
Saint-Hubert	QC	PC	BQ	34,959	56.90%	15,344	24.97%	Lib	%	19,615	–	4,520	34,959	903	339	868	–	–	–	240	61,444
Saint-Hyacinthe—Bagot	QC	PC	BQ	28,014	57.38%	17,890	36.64%	Lib	%	10,124	–	9,834	28,014	848	–	–	–	–	–	–	48,820
Saint-Jean	QC	PC	BQ	29,753	55.88%	15,410	28.94%	Lib	%	14,343	–	7,780	29,753	497	–	773	–	–	–	100	53,246
Saint-Laurent—Cartierville	QC	Lib	Lib	32,190	70.05%	23,718	51.61%	BQ	%	32,190	–	3,414	8,472	895	292	347	–	–	–	345	45,955
Saint-Léonard	QC	Lib	Lib	28,799	61.16%	15,920	33.81%	BQ	%	28,799	–	4,021	12,879	583	–	499	–	–	–	309	47,090
Saint-Maurice	QC	PC	Lib	25,200	54.06%	6,304	13.52%	BQ	%	25,200	–	1,909	18,896	236	–	372	–	–	–	–	46,613
Shefford	QC	Lib	BQ	27,125	55.69%	12,971	26.63%	Lib	%	14,154	–	5,836	27,125	601	–	763	–	–	–	225	48,704
Sherbrooke	QC	PC	PC	29,758	52.37%	8,210	14.45%	BQ	%	4,458	–	29,758	21,548	446	–	523	–	–	–	86	56,819
Témiscamingue	QC	PC	BQ	22,540	55.74%	13,292	32.87%	Lib	%	9,248	–	7,819	22,540	–	–	529	–	–	–	299	40,435
Terrebonne	QC	PC	BQ	58,030	68.87%	42,928	50.95%	Lib	%	15,102	–	9,825	58,030	900	–	–	–	–	–	403	84,260
Trois-Rivières	QC	PC	BQ	24,927	53.43%	13,977	29.96%	PC	%	9,882	–	10,950	24,927	370	–	522	–	–	–	–	46,651
Vaudreuil	QC	PC	Lib	31,148	47.76%	6,010	9.22%	BQ	%	31,148	–	6,471	25,138	1,107	–	727	–	–	–	626	65,217
Verchères	QC	PC	BQ	38,633	67.31%	26,501	46.17%	Lib	%	12,132	–	5,269	38,633	695	–	–	–	470	–	194	57,393
Verdun—Saint-Paul (Note: The incumbent Gilbert Chartrand, elected under the PC banner in 1988, was one of the founding members of the BQ. He decided not to stand for reelection in 1993.)	QC	PC	Lib	19,644	43.69%	549	1.22%	BQ	%	19,644	–	3,864	19,095	860	130	432	598	–	115	228	44,966
Kindersley—Lloydminster	SK	PC	Ref	12,292	40.45%	3,836	12.62%	Lib	%	8,456	12,292	4,134	–	4,981	392	–	–	–	–	134	30,389
Mackenzie	SK	NDP	NDP	9,438	31.14%	1,238	4.08%	Ref	%	8,078	8,200	3,882	–	9,438	–	–	–	599	–	112	30,309
Moose Jaw—Lake Centre	SK	NDP	Ref	10,432	30.34%	310	0.90%	NDP	%	9,354	10,432	4,204	–	10,122	–	158	–	–	–	117	34,387
Prince Albert—Churchill River	SK	NDP	Lib	11,601	38.61%	2,506	8.34%	NDP	%	11,601	5,702	1,424	–	9,095	445	–	–	–	1,655	125	30,047
Regina—Lumsden	SK	NDP	NDP	12,879	35.85%	1,025	2.85%	Lib	%	11,854	7,665	2,668	–	12,879	779	–	–	–	–	80	35,925
Regina—Qu'Appelle	SK	NDP	NDP	11,166	34.43%	1,075	3.31%	Lib	%	10,091	7,317	3,287	–	11,166	394	–	–	–	–	177	32,432
Regina—Wascana	SK	PC	Lib	19,555	44.21%	10,161	22.97%	NDP	%	19,555 (Note: Ralph Goodale had also previously been leader of the Saskatchewan Liberals from 1981 to 1988.)	6,934	6,943	–	9,394	734	228	–	192	189	64	44,233
Saskatoon—Clark's Crossing	SK	NDP	NDP	12,266	30.85%	1,066	2.68%	Lib	%	11,200	11,149	4,114	–	12,266	652	188	–	–	114	77	39,760
Saskatoon—Dundurn	SK	NDP	Lib	14,716	35.31%	3,202	7.68%	NDP	%	14,716	10,281	3,726	–	11,514	784	205	–	–	370	81	41,677
Saskatoon—Humboldt	SK	NDP	Lib	12,838	34.34%	1,683	4.50%	Ref	%	12,838	11,155	3,530	–	8,546	904	255	–	–	158	–	37,386
Souris—Moose Mountain	SK	PC	Lib	10,917	32.43%	591	1.76%	Ref	%	10,917	10,326	5,042	–	5,541	–	–	–	–	1,565	269	33,660
Swift Current—Maple Creek—Assiniboia	SK	PC	Ref	11,486	34.88%	825	2.51%	Lib	%	10,661	11,486	5,119	–	5,448	–	216	–	–	–	–	32,930
The Battlefords—Meadow Lake	SK	NDP	NDP	9,772	31.23%	729	2.33%	Ref	%	7,364	9,043	4,299	–	9,772	–	–	–	–	609	202	31,289
Yorkton—Melville	SK	NDP	Ref	10,605	32.68%	1,074	3.31%	Lib	%	9,531	10,605	2,825	–	9,487	–	–	–	–	–	–	32,448
Nunatsiaq	Terr	Lib	Lib	6,685	69.79%	4,715	49.22%	PC	%	6,685	–	1,970	–	924	–	–	–	–	–	–	9,579
Western Arctic	Terr	Lib	Lib	8,867	62.47%	6,867	48.38%	Ref	%	8,867	2,000	1,893	–	896	–	213	325	–	–	–	14,194
Yukon	Terr	NDP	NDP	6,252	43.34%	2,893	20.06%	Lib	%	3,359	1,891	2,566	–	6,252	296	–	–	61	–	–	14,425

=== Results by province ===
Party name		BC	AB	SK	MB	ON	QC	NB	NS	PE	NL	NT	YK	Total
Liberal	Seats:	6	4	5	12	98	19	9	11	4	7	2	-	177
Liberal	Popular vote:	28.1	25.1	32.1	45.0	52.9	33.0	56.0	52.0	60.1	67.3	65.4	23.2	41.3
Bloc Québécois	Seats:						54							54
Bloc Québécois	Vote:						49.3							13.5
Reform	Seats:	24	22	4	1	1		-	-	-	-	-	-	52
Reform	Vote:	36.4	52.3	27.2	22.4	20.1		8.5	13.3	1.0	1.0	8.4	13.1	18.7
New Democratic Party	Seats:	2	-	5	1	-	-	-	-	-	-	-	1	9
New Democratic Party	Vote:	15.5	4.1	26.6	16.7	6.0	1.5	4.9	6.8	5.2	3.5	7.7	43.4	6.9
Progressive Conservative	Seats:	-	-	-	-	-	1	1	-	-	-	-	-	2
Progressive Conservative	Vote:	13.5	14.6	11.3	11.9	17.6	13.5	27.9	23.5	32.0	26.7	16.2	17.7	16.0
Other	Seats:	-	-	-	-	-	1	-	-					1
Other	Vote:	0.3	0.4	1.0	0.1	0.8	1.1	1.3	2.1					0.8
Total seats		32	26	14	14	99	75	10	11	4	7	2	1	295
Parties that won no seats:
National	Vote:	4.1	2.4	1.0	3.1	1.2	0.1	0.3	1.1	0.5	0.5		2.1	1.4
Natural Law	Vote:	0.6	0.6	0.3	0.4	0.5	0.8	0.5	0.9	0.2	0.8	0.9		0.6
Green	Vote:	0.7	0.3			0.3	0.1		0.1	0.3		1.4		0.2
Christian Heritage	Vote:	0.4	0.2	0.2	0.3	0.3		0.3	0.3	0.7	0.2		0.4	0.2
Libertarian	Vote:	0.3				0.2	0.1							0.1
Abolitionist	Vote:					0.1	0.2							0.1
Canada Party	Vote:	0.1	0.1	0.3	0.3			0.3						0.1
Commonwealth	Vote:						0.2							0.1
Marxist–Leninist	Vote:					0.1								0.0

=== Ten closest ridings ===
1. Edmonton Northwest, AB: Anne McLellan (LIB) def Richard Kayler (REF) by 12 votes
2. Bourassa, QC: Osvaldo Nunez (BQ) def Denis Coderre (LIB) by 67 votes
3. Edmonton North, AB: John Loney (LIB) def Ron Mix (REF) by 83 votes
4. Simcoe Centre, ON: Ed Harper (REF) def Janice Laking (LIB) by 123 votes
5. Edmonton East, AB: Judy Bethel (LIB) def Linda Robertson (REF) by 203 votes
6. Winnipeg Transcona, MB: Bill Blaikie (NDP) def Art Miki (LIB) by 219 votes
7. Moose Jaw—Lake Centre, SK: Allan Kerpan (REF) def Rod Laporte (NDP) by 310 votes
8. Edmonton—Strathcona, AB: Hugh Hanrahan (REF) def Chris Peirce (LIB) by 418 votes
9. La Prairie, QC: Richard Bélisle (BQ) def Jacques Saada (LIB) by 476 votes
10. Souris—Moose Mountain, SK: Bernie Collins (LIB) def Doug Heimlick (REF) by 499 votes
  Verdun—Saint-Paul, QC: Raymond Lavigne (LIB) def Kim Beaudoin (BQ) by 499 votes

== Results analysis ==
Ternary plots - effect of PC split (1993)
1993 (consolidated results)

1993 (PC highlighted)

1993 (BQ highlighted)

1993 (Reform highlighted)
Electoral districts identified by colours of winning parties

The distribution of seats in the House of Commons after the 1988 election. The blue is Progressive Conservative, the red Liberal, and the orange NDP

The shape of the House of Commons after the 1993 election. The two new parties are represented with Reform in Green and the Bloc in cyan

=== Liberals ===
The Liberals swept Newfoundland, Nova Scotia, and Prince Edward Island, with only Elsie Wayne's win in New Brunswick denying them a clean sweep of Atlantic Canada. They also won all but one seat in Ontario; only a 123-vote loss to Reform's Ed Harper in Simcoe Centre denied the Liberals the first clean sweep of Canada's most populous province by a single party. In both Ontario and Atlantic Canada, the Liberals gained support from many centre-right voters who were fed up with the Tories but found Reform too extreme for comfort. Ontario replaced Quebec (see below) as the main bastion of Liberal support for the next two decades; the party easily won a majority of the province's seats in the next four elections.

In the West, the Liberals dominated Manitoba, winning all but two seats. They also won seats in Saskatchewan for the first time since 1974 and in Alberta for the first time since 1968. In Saskatchewan, the Liberals won the popular vote for the first (and, as of 2025, only) time since 1949 and tied the NDP for a plurality of the seats. All of their Alberta seats were in the Edmonton area (Anne McLellan in Edmonton Northwest, John Loney in Edmonton North, and Judy Bethel in Edmonton East), which has historically been friendlier to the Liberals than the rest of Alberta. The Liberals also held onto Edmonton Southeast, the lone seat in Alberta they held when the writ was dropped, which they picked up in 1990 when David Kilgour crossed the floor from the Progressive Conservatives.

Despite being led by a Quebecker, the Liberals were unable to recover their dominant position in Quebec. This was in part due to the staunchly federalist Chrétien's opposition to the Meech Lake Accord, which was revealed when leadership rival Paul Martin pressed him on the issue back in 1990. Chrétien's reputation in his home province never recovered, especially when the Bloc Québécois rallied on the issue. As a result, the Liberals were unable to capitalize on the collapse of Tory support in the province. The Tories had swept to power in 1984 largely by flipping many long-time Liberal bastions in Quebec, and held onto most of them in 1988. However, with few exceptions, most of that support bled to the Bloc in 1993. While the Liberals dominated the Montreal area (home to almost 75% of the province's anglophones) and the Outaouais (home to a large number of civil servants who work across the river in Ottawa), they only won two seats elsewhere. One of them belonged to Chrétien, who won in Saint-Maurice, a strongly nationalist riding that he had previously represented from 1963 to 1986 (he had represented Beauséjour, New Brunswick as Opposition Leader from 1990 to 1993). The Liberals also did not do as well as hoped in British Columbia, winning almost no seats outside Vancouver.

Even with these disappointments, the Liberals won 177 seats — the third-best performance in party history, and their best performance since their record of 190 seats in 1949. This gave them an overwhelming majority in the Commons; no other party crossed the 60-seat mark. The Liberals were also the only party to win seats in every province.

=== Bloc Québécois ===
The Bloc won 54 seats, capturing just under half the vote in Quebec and nearly sweeping the francophone ridings there. In many cases, they pushed Tory cabinet ministers from the province into third place. This was the best showing by a third party since the 1921 election, when the Progressive Party won 60 seats. The Bloc's results were considered very impressive since the party had only been formed three years before, and because there were lingering questions about its viability.

On paper, the Bloc was in a rather precarious position. Most of the Tories' support in Quebec was built on flipping ridings that had voted Liberal for decades. However, francophone anger at Chrétien's staunch federalism caused PC support in Quebec to transfer virtually en masse to the Bloc. Most of those seats would remain in Bloc hands for two decades, until nearly all of them were lost to the NDP at an election in which the Bloc was cut down to only four seats.

Despite only running candidates in Quebec, the Bloc's strong showing in that province and the fragmentation of the national vote made them the second-largest party in the Commons and gave them Official Opposition status. As the Official Opposition, they enjoyed considerable privileges over other parties; for instance, Question Periods in the 35th Parliament were dominated by issues of national unity.

=== Reform ===
Reform had a major breakthrough, gaining a substantial portion of the Tories' previous support in the West. The party won all but four seats in Alberta and dominated British Columbia as well. Reform also finished second in the popular vote in Saskatchewan, where they won four seats, and picked up one seat in Manitoba.

While Reform was expected to win over PC support, it also won around a quarter of voters who had voted for the NDP in the previous election. They did this by raising the problem of Western alienation and rallying against the Charlottetown Accord, two issues that the NDP made unpopular stands on. In one stroke, Reform had replaced the Progressive Conservatives as the major right-wing party in Canada (despite being virtually nonexistent east of Manitoba) and supplanted the NDP as the voice of Western discontent.

Reform had built up a large base of support in rural central Ontario, which had been the backbone of past provincial Tory governments. This area is very socially conservative—in some cases, almost as socially conservative as rural Western Canada. However, this support did not translate into actual seats; massive vote splitting with the PCs allowed the Liberals to sneak up the middle and take all but one seat in the area. Reform did manage to take Simcoe Centre—their only victory east of Manitoba, ever—but even this win came by a wafer-thin 123-vote margin over the Liberals. They were also shut out of Atlantic Canada and did not run candidates in Quebec. It is not likely they would have won any seats in Quebec in any case due to Manning's inability to speak fluent French, its uncompromising federalism, and opposition to official bilingualism. Nonetheless, the election was a tremendous success for a party that had only won 2.1 per cent of the national vote in the previous election.

Reform's heavy concentration of Western support netted it 52 seats. However, the Bloc's concentration of support in Quebec was slightly larger, leaving Reform three seats short of making Manning Leader of the Opposition. Though the Bloc was the Official Opposition, the Liberals reckoned Reform as their main opposition on all other issues that were not specific to Quebec. Also, in 1995 when Bloc leader Lucien Bouchard's position as Opposition Leader granted him a meeting with visiting U.S. President Bill Clinton, Manning was also given a meeting with Clinton in order to defuse Bouchard's separatist leverage.

=== New Democrats ===
The NDP won the fewest votes of any major party, and only nine seats — three short of the requirement for official party status. This was a substantial drop from its record performance in 1988. Those members who were elected were in heavily divided ridings, mostly in the party's traditional Western heartland. On average, winning NDP MPs only got 35.1% of the vote. Ultimately, the NDP only retained 34.99% of the votes it received in the 1988 election, even less than the 38.58% of the vote that the Progressive Conservatives retained.

The New Democrats lost support in several directions. One factor was the unpopularity of NDP provincial governments led by Bob Rae in Ontario and Mike Harcourt in British Columbia, which reflected badly on their federal counterpart. In 1988, the peak of federal NDP support was a major asset to the success of provincial affiliates; however, by 1993, they were a considerable liability to the federal party because of recessions, social policies, and scandals. Not coincidentally, the federal NDP was decimated in both of those provinces; it lost all 10 of its Ontario MPs and all but two of its British Columbia MPs, more than half of the party's caucus in the Commons. The party also lost its only seat in Alberta, where the Alberta NDP had also been wiped out earlier in the year. Defeated Ontario MP Steven Langdon had called upon Rae to resign, having spent the 1993 election campaign disassociating himself from the provincial NDP's measures. The Ontario NDP would be heavily defeated in 1995 (in which it was reduced to third place), while the British Columbia NDP rebounded long enough to survive until it was almost wiped out in 2001.

A significant number of NDP voters also switched to Reform. Despite sharp differences in ideology, Reform's populism struck a chord with many NDP voters; twenty-four per cent of those who voted NDP in 1988 switched to Reform. In 1989, while running for the federal NDP leadership, former British Columbia Premier Dave Barrett argued that the party should be concerned with Western alienation rather than focusing its attention on Quebec. However, Barrett was defeated at the convention by Audrey McLaughlin, and his platform was not adopted by the party. The NDP also supported the Charlottetown Accord, which Barrett called a mistake since it was unpopular in Western Canada. In contrast, Barrett raised the issue of Western alienation and strongly opposed the Accord. Barrett's warning proved to be remarkably prescient, as the NDP was severely punished in its former Western stronghold.

The NDP had never been a force in Quebec, but they had been supported by those who would not vote for either the Liberals or Progressive Conservatives. While McLaughlin made efforts to make inroads in Quebec, this proved fruitless and likely contributed to Western discontent. These voters largely moved to the Bloc, with 14% of NDP voters supporting the Bloc in 1993. The NDP lost their only seat in the province, which it had gained in a 1990 by-election, as Phil Edmonston, a Quebec nationalist, opted not to see re-election because he disagreed with the party's support for the Charlottetown Accord.

=== Progressive Conservatives ===
The election was a debacle for the Tories. Their popular vote plunged from 43% to 16%, losing more than half their vote from 1988. They lost all but two of the 156 seats they held when Parliament was dissolved—far surpassing the Liberals' 95-seat loss in 1984. It was the worst defeat, both in absolute terms and in terms of percentage of seats lost, for a governing party at the federal level in Canada, and among the worst ever suffered for a governing party in a Westminster system. It is also one of the few instances of a governing party in any country going from a strong majority to being almost wiped off the electoral map.

Mulroney's "grand coalition" completely fell apart. The Tories' support in the West, with few exceptions, transferred to Reform, while their party's support in Quebec was split between the Liberals and the Bloc, and their support in Atlantic Canada and Ontario largely migrated to the Liberals. The PCs did win over two million votes, almost as many as Reform and far ahead of the Bloc or NDP. However, this support was spread out across the country. Due to the first past the post system, which awards power solely on the basis of seats won, the Tories' support was not concentrated in enough areas to translate into seats. The party was shut out of Ontario for the first time in its history. Mulroney's former riding, Charlevoix in eastern Quebec, fell to Bloc candidate Gérard Asselin in a landslide; the Tory candidate only received 6,800 votes and almost lost his deposit.

Campbell was defeated in her Vancouver riding by rookie Liberal Hedy Fry—only the third time in Canadian history that a sitting prime minister lost an election and was unseated at the same time (it previously happened to Arthur Meighen twice: in 1921 and 1926). All other Cabinet members lost their seats except for Jean Charest, who won re-election in Sherbrooke, Quebec; moreover, many prominent ministers such as Michael Wilson, Don Mazankowski, Joe Clark, and John Crosbie did not seek re-election. The only other Progressive Conservative besides Charest to win a Commons seat was Elsie Wayne, the popular mayor of Saint John, New Brunswick. Gilles Bernier, who had served two terms as a Progressive Conservative from Beauce, Quebec, was also re-elected, but was forced to run as an independent after Campbell barred him from running under the PC banner due to fraud charges. Famously, following their devastating defeat, Campbell joked "Gee, I'm glad I didn't sell my car" during her concession speech. She resigned as party leader in December.

In addition, 147 PC candidates failed to win 15% of the vote, losing their deposits and failing to qualify for funding from Elections Canada. The party as a whole was left deeply in debt, and came up ten seats short of official party status in the Commons. Without official party status, the Progressive Conservatives lost access to funding and had a considerably reduced role in Parliament.

== Legacy ==
The 1993 election is considered a political realignment election with lasting effects on Canadian politics.

Since Confederation in 1867, Canada has had a two-party system with the Liberals and Conservatives alternating in government. Since the 1920s there had generally been one or more third parties in the House of Commons (small caucuses had been elected from that source even before 1920). None of these parties came close to winning power and of those parties, the CCF was the only one that achieved long-term success. The CCF was folded into the NDP in 1961, by which time it had clearly established itself as the nation's third major party. It eventually gained enough strength to wield the balance of power in the Liberal minority governments of the 1960s and 1970s. After the 1984 election the NDP only lost one seat and finished only 10 seats behind the Liberals. This led to considerable talk that Canada was headed for a UK-style Labour-Tory division, with the Liberals following their UK counterparts into third-party status.

However, the Liberals recovered enough ground in 1988 to firmly reestablish themselves as the main opposition party to the Conservatives.

The 1993 election fundamentally changed the balance of power among the parties. The Liberals emerged into strength and has been a party to be reckoned with ever since. This strength was gained by strong support in Central Canada.

Together Ontario and Quebec are guaranteed a majority of seats in the Commons under both Constitution Acts. Those two provinces constitute nearly two-thirds of the Canadian population. Thus, it is nearly impossible to form even a minority government without considerable support in one or both provinces. In the early 1990s Liberals were the only party with a strong base in both provinces, making it the only party with a realistic chance to form government. The Liberals dominated Canadian politics for the next decade, retaining almost all of its Ontario ridings while making steady gains in Quebec. They were not seriously challenged until 2004, with the sponsorship scandal and party infighting reduced them to a minority government with continued strong support from Ontario. The Liberals retained the majority of Ontario ridings, despite being defeated in 2006, finally relinquishing their lead in 2008.

In fact the Liberals were so strong in the 1990s that no party other than the Liberals had a realistic chance of forming government after 1993. Some commentators said that Canada had moved to a dominant-party system. The opposition to the Liberals in the House of Commons was divided between four parties. Many commentators said it was ironic that Her Majesty's Loyal Opposition consisted of a separatist party. The Liberals, along with several commentators, said they considered the Reform Party the de facto opposition on issues that did not pertain to Quebec and national unity.

On the other hand, some political scientists said the new five-party parliament was an example of a multi-party system. The five parties were reduced to four when the PC Party and Canadian Alliance (successor to the Reform Party) merged in 2003. From 2004 to 2006, three opposition parties—the new Conservatives, NDP, and Bloc—faced the Liberal minority government. Then three opposition parties in the House of Commons faced a Conservative minority government from 2006 to 2008.

After the Liberals' win in 1993, it was almost 20 years before the Progressive Conservatives regained power. These were bleak years for the party. In December 1993, Campbell resigned as Conservative leader and was replaced by Charest, the only surviving member of the previous Cabinet. Under Charest, they rebounded to 20 seats in 1997. Despite naming former prime minister Joe Clark as leader in 1998, the party was reduced to 12 seats in the 2000 election, mostly in the Atlantic provinces and Quebec. They would win only two seats west of Quebec in the next two elections, finally ascending to majority government in 2011 with Stephen Harper at the helm.

In 1997 election, the Reform Party replaced the Bloc as the Official Opposition. Although Reform was then the major right-wing party in Canada, most Ontarians saw it as too extreme and it had little chance of dislodging the Liberals. Its chances were also hampered in Quebec because Manning could not speak French. In 2000, the party evolved into the Canadian Alliance but even then won only two seats outside its Western Canadian base (both in Ontario).

In 2003, the Canadian Alliance under Stephen Harper and the Progressive Conservatives under Peter MacKay merged, creating the Conservative Party of Canada. The new party, led by Harper, reduced the Liberals to a minority government in 2004 by capitalizing on the sponsorship scandal. It then formed its first government, a minority, in early 2006 with Harper as prime minister. Key to its victory was that it made inroads into the eastern part of Canada. In the 2008 election, the Conservatives won a stronger minority government and then won majority government in 2011. However, this was of short duration and the Liberals defeated them in 2015.

The NDP recovered somewhat, regaining official party status in 1997. However, it would take another decade for the party to reach the same level of support it enjoyed in the 1980s. The NDP supported the Liberal minority government after the 2004 election but moved towards differentiating itself from the Liberals, including uniting with the other opposition parties to bring down the Liberals and force the 2006 election in which the NDP made substantial gains in the House of Commons.

The Bloc Québécois failed to propel the sovereigntist side to victory in the 1995 Quebec referendum and lost Official Opposition status in the 1997 election. It lost more seats in the 2000 election. However, bolstered by the Liberals' sponsorship scandal, it remained a significant presence in the House of Commons. The Bloc nearly tied its large 1993 vote tally in 2004 but then in 2006 it lost support to a resurgent Conservative Party. The Bloc's position continued to erode in 2008. The BQ won with 47 of Quebec's 75 seats but saw its popular vote decline, although it remained an important force in federal politics for Quebec. 2011 saw massive change in Quebec, with the Bloc losing a third of its voter support, getting just 4 seats in the Commons and losing official party status. BQ made a modest comeback in the 2015 election, increasing their seat count to 10, 2 seats short of regaining official party status. In the 2019 election, BQ took half again more votes, tripled its seat count and became the third-largest party in the House, once again becoming a strong force in Canadian politics. In the following 2021 election, it kept all its seats and its vote share.

== See also ==
- List of Canadian federal general elections
- List of political parties in Canada
- 2024 United Kingdom general election

Articles on parties' candidates in this election:

- Independents
- Abolitionists
- Canada Party
- Commonwealth
- Greens
- Libertarians
- National Party
- Natural Law
- New Democrats
- Progressive Conservatives
- Reform Party
