= Opinion polling for the 1993 Canadian federal election =

Polls leading up to the 1993 Canadian federal election.

== National polls ==
Graph of opinion polls conducted

=== Campaign period ===
Evolution of voting intentions at national level
Last day of survey	LPC	Reform	PC	BQ	NDP	Other	Polling firm	Sample	ME	Source
Voting results	41.24	18.69	16.04	13.52	6.88	3.59				
October 22, 1993	43	18	18	14	7	3	Angus Reid	—	—	PDF
October 20, 1993	44	19	16	12	7	2	Gallup	1,011	± 3.1	PDF
October 20, 1993	43	17	17	14	7	2	Angus Reid	3,329	—	
October 14, 1993	40	16	22	13	7	2	Comquest	1,504	± 2.5	PDF
October 6, 1993	37	18	22	12	8	—	Angus Reid	1,961	± 2.5	HTML
September 28, 1993	39	17	25	12	6	1	Ekos	1,505	± 2.5	PDF
September 26, 1993	38	14	26	12	8	2	Compas	—	—	HTML
September 23, 1993	37	13	30	10	8	2	Gallup	1,015	—	PDF
September 23, 1993	34	15	28	12	7	3	Léger	1,745	—	PDF
September 22, 1993	36	13	31	11	7	2	CROP	3,010	± 2.0	PDF
September 16, 1993	35	11	35	11	6	2	Angus Reid	—	—	HTML
September 14, 1993	33	11	36	10	8	2	Comquest	—	—	HTML
September 9, 1993	33	11	34	11	10	2	Environics	1,505	—	
September 9, 1993	37	10	35	8	8	2	Angus Reid	1,414	± 2.5	HTML
Official call of federal elections (September 8, 1993)

=== During the 34th Parliament of Canada ===
Evolution of voting intentions at national level
Last day of survey	LPC	Reform	PC	BQ	NDP	Other	Polling firm	Sample	ME	Source
September 3, 1993	33	11	34	11	10	2	Environics	—	± 2.3	
August 16, 1993	40	7	36	6	8	3	Gallup	1,012	± 3.1	PDF
August 5, 1993	39	9	35	—	7	—	Angus Reid	1,056	± 2.5	1, 2,
July 13, 1993	43	7	33	8	8	1	Gallup	1,010	± 3.1	PDF
June 28, 1993	39	7	35	7	9	3	Angus Reid	1,501	± 2.5	PDF
Kim Campbell becomes Prime Minister of Canada (June 25, 1993)
April 17, 1993	39	—	31	—	13	—	Gallup	1,040	—	PDF
April 2, 1993 (Note: Assuming Kim Campbell leader of Progressive Conservative Party of Canada.)	29	5	50	6	9	—	Gallup	1,012	—	
April 2, 1993	39	—	32	—	13	—	Gallup	1,012	—	PDF
March 25, 1993	36	9	33	9	12	—	Environics	1,988	—	
March 25, 1993 (Note: Assuming Jean Charest leader of Progressive Conservative Party of Canada.)	42	11	20	9	15	—	Environics	1,988	—	
March 18, 1993	25	10	43	8	11	—	Angus Reid	1,500	—	
March 15, 1993	32	10	45	4	9	—	Comquest	1,439	—	
March 15, 1993	42	7	29	—	13	9	Gallup	1,025	± 3.1	PDF
Brian Mulroney announces that he is leaving politics (February 24, 1993)
February 15, 1993	49	8	21	3	16	—	Gallup	2,017	± 2.2	PDF
January 30, 1993	46	—	18	—	17	—	Angus Reid	1,500	± 2.5	
December 6, 1992	42	12	17	9	18	—	Angus Reid	1,500	—	PDF
December 5, 1992	40	15	15	12	18	—	Environics	2,000	—	PDF
November 16, 1992	47	11	22	—	14	—	Gallup	1,006	± 3.1	PDF
September 14, 1992	44	8	21	—	18	—	Gallup	—	—	
Charlottetown Accord is rejected by referendum (October 26, 1992)
July 11, 1992	42	10	22	6	18	—	Gallup	1,027	—	1 2
June 6, 1992	44	11	17	6	21	2	Gallup	1,024	± 3.1	PDF
May 26, 1992	36	12	20	7	22	3	Angus Reid	1,502	± 2.5	
April 11, 1992	36	15	16	9	22	—	Gallup	1,035	± 4.0	PDF
March 7, 1992	40	14	12	10	22	2	Gallup	1,001	± 4.0	PDF
February 5, 1992	39	14	16	8	22	1	Angus Reid	1,500	± 2.5	
January 11, 1992	39	—	12	—	24	—	Gallup	1,013	± 4.0	PDF
December 7, 1991	38	12	23	9	16	—	Gallup	1,006	± 4.0	PDF
December 5, 1991	40	15	15	12	18	0	Environics	2,000	—	
November 9, 1991	37	11	14	11	25	—	Gallup	1,004	± 4.0	PDF
October 7, 1991	39	16	15	10	19	1	Environics	—	—	
September 11, 1991	32	14	17	9	25	—	Angus Reid	1,504	± 2.5	PDF
September 7, 1991	38	12	16	7	26	—	Gallup	1,037	± 4.0	1 2
August 22, 1991	39	13	13	8	25	1	Gallup	1,030	± 4.0	PDF
July 1991	37	13	17	8	23	2	Angus Reid	—	—	PDF
Official creation of Bloc Québécois (June 15, 1991)
June 8, 1991	35	16	15	—	23	11	Gallup	—	—	
June 2, 1991	34	15	16	6	27	—	Angus Reid	1,508	± 2.5	
May 7, 1991	30	17	16	8	26	—	Angus Reid	1,500	± 2.5	
May 4, 1991	34	13	14	—	28	11	Gallup	1,040	± 4.0	
April 13, 1991	32	16	14	10	26	2	Gallup	1,024	± 4.0	PDF
March 20, 1991	34	7	17	4	34	4	Angus Reid	1,503	± 2.5	
March 9, 1991	39	7	16	7	30	1	Gallup	1,039	± 4.0	1 2
February 23, 1991	29	11	19	9	30	—	Environics	1,506	± 2.5	PDF
February 9, 1991	35	8	12	—	34	—	Gallup	1,037	± 4.0	
January 21, 1991	32	7	20	4	35	2	Angus Reid	1,501	± 2.5	PDF
January 5, 1991	31	9	12	5	41	5	Gallup	1,026	± 4.0	
December 22, 1990	34	—	15	—	36	—	Angus Reid	1,500	± 2.5	
December 8, 1990	32	8	14	8	36	—	Gallup	1,011	± 4.0	1 2
November 19, 1990	30	11	14	10	32	3	Environics	—	—	
November 10, 1990	34	—	17	—	38	—	Angus Reid	1,500	± 2.5	
October 13, 1990	31	9	15	4	38	—	Gallup	1,041	± 4.0	PDF
September 19, 1990	39	—	18	—	33	10	Angus Reid	1,504	± 2.5	
September 15, 1990	39	7	15	4	32	3	Gallup	1,051	± 4.0	PDF
August 11, 1990	46	6	20	5	22	1	Gallup	1,034	± 4.0	PDF
Start of Gulf War (August 2, 1990)
July 14, 1990	50	—	19	–	19	10	Gallup	1,034	± 4.0	PDF
Jean Chrétien becomes head of Liberal Party of Canada (June 23, 1990)
Failure to ratify Meech Lake Accord (June 22, 1990)
June 16, 1990	50	7	17	–	23	3	Gallup	1,011	± 4.0	PDF
June 12, 1990	50	—	23	—	17	10	Angus Reid	1,773	± 2.5	
May 5, 1990	47	7	18	–	24	4	Gallup	1,025	± 4.0	
April 7, 1990	49	6	16	–	24	5	Gallup	1,049	± 4.0	
April 2, 1990	53	—	15	–	23	—	Angus Reid	1,501	± 2.5	
March 10, 1990	50	5	17	–	25	3	Gallup	1,054	± 4.0	
February 10, 1990	47	4	19	–	27	3	Gallup	1,003	± 4.0	PDF
January 13, 1990	48	—	22	–	23	—	Gallup	1,041	—	PDF
December 21, 1989	40	3	23	–	30	3	Angus Reid	1,501	± 2.5	PDF
Audrey McLaughlin becomes leader of the NDP (December 5, 1989)
November 11, 1989	42	—	26	–	25	7	Gallup	1,034	± 4.0	
October 5, 1989	44	—	28	–	22	6	Gallup	1,034	± 4.0	
September 9, 1989	41	—	30	–	24	5	Gallup	1,051	± 4.0	
July 8, 1989	38	—	31	–	25	6	Gallup	1,034	± 4.0	
June 21, 1989	39	—	34	–	25	2	Environics	1,443	± 2.5	PDF
May 30, 1989	37	—	34	–	26	3	Angus Reid	1,502	± 2.5	
May 20, 1989	40	—	32	–	25	—	Gallup	—	—	PDF
John Turner announces his intention to step down as leader of the Liberal Party of Canada. (May 14, 1989)
March 30, 1989	29	—	44	–	23	4	Angus Reid	1,501	± 2.5	
March 25, 1989	33	—	39	–	24	4	Environics	1,465	± 2.5	
January 7, 1989	26	—	48	–	23	3	Gallup	1,021	± 4.0	
December 3, 1988	28	—	49	–	20	3	Gallup	1,012	± 4.0	
November 21, 1988	31.92	2.09	43.02	–	20.38	2.59				

== By geographic area ==
=== In the Atlantic provinces ===
Evolution of voting intentions in the Atlantic provinces
Last day of survey	LPC	Reform	PC	NDP	Other	Polling firm	Sample	ME	Source
October 20, 1993	59	5	30	5	2	Gallup	—	—	PDF
October 20, 1993	56	10	28	5	1	Angus Reid	—	± 7.0	
October 14, 1993	46	—	42	—	—	Comquest	—	—	PDF
October 6, 1993	57	—	32	—	—	Angus Reid	—	± 10.0	
Official call of federal elections (September 8, 1993)
July 13, 1993	59	2	29	11	0	Gallup	—	—	PDF
February 5, 1992	53	6	21	18	2	Angus Reid	—	—	
June 8, 1991	31	10	29	28	2	Gallup	—	—	
May 7, 1991	39	4	26	29	—	Angus Reid	—	—	
March 9, 1991	65	—	13	22	—	Gallup	—	—	
February 9, 1991	60	—	8	28	—	Gallup	—	—	
August 11, 1990	59	—	18	17	—	Gallup	—	—	
July 14, 1990	64	—	13	15	—	Gallup	—	—	PDF
May 5, 1990	68	—	18	12	2	Gallup	—	—	
February 10, 1990	59	—	17	14	—	Gallup	—	—	
November 11, 1989	54	—	37	—	—	Gallup	—	—	
October 5, 1989	61	—	17	15	7	Gallup	—	—	
June 21, 1989	52	—	32	15	1	Environics	—	—	

=== In Québec ===
==== Campaign period ====
Last day of survey	BQ	LPC	PC	NDP	Other	Polling firm	Sample	ME	Source
Voting results	49.3	33.0	13.5	1.5	2.7				
October 20, 1993	55	28	13	2	2	SOM	1,023	—	PDF
October 20, 1993	50	31	14	3	2	Gallup	—	± 6.0	PDF
October 20, 1993	52	30	13	2	2	Angus Reid	—	± 4.0	
October 19, 1993	54	28	14	2	2	SOM	—	—	PDF
October 18, 1993	55	28	15	1	1	SOM	1,022	—	PDF
October 17, 1993	51	29	17	3	0	SOM	1,022	—	PDF
October 16, 1993	51	30	16	2	1	SOM	1,016	—	PDF
October 15, 1993	50	30	18	1	1	SOM	—	—	PDF
October 14, 1993	52	26	16	—	—	Comquest	—	± 5.1	PDF
October 14, 1993	50	27	20	—	—	Léger	—	± 3.1	PDF
October 14, 1993	50	30	17	—	3 (Note: Includes the NDP)	SOM	—	—	PDF
October 13, 1993	50	28	17	—	5	SOM	—	—	PDF
October 12, 1993	52	26	17	3	2	SOM	1,027	—	PDF
October 11, 1993	52	27	18	3	—	Multi-Réso	1,001	± 3.1	
October 11, 1993	50	27	17	3	3	SOM	—	—	PDF
October 10, 1993	52	27	17	2	2	SOM	—	—	PDF
October 9, 1993	50	28	17	2	3	SOM	—	—	PDF
October 8, 1993	49	29	18	2	2	SOM	—	—	PDF
October 7, 1993	50	27	19	2	2	SOM	1,054	± 3.1	PDF
October 6, 1993	46	27	20	—	—	Angus Reid	—	± 5.0	
October 6, 1993	47	28	20	2	3	SOM	—	—	PDF
October 5, 1993	47	26	22	2	3	SOM	—	—	PDF
October 4, 1993	44	26	24	2	—	SOM	1,059	—	PDF
October 3, 1993	46	26	23	1	—	SOM	1,042	± 3.4	PDF
September 28, 1993	47	23	25	—	—	Ekos	508	± 4.3	PDF
September 28, 1993	44	24	27	1	—	SOM	—	—	PDF
September 23, 1993	38	29	29	—	—	Gallup	268	± 6.0	PDF
September 23, 1993	43	28	22	4	3	Léger	745	—	PDF
September 22, 1993	45	24	27	3	1	CROP	1,001	—	PDF
September 14, 1993	40	20	32	5	3	Comquest	—	—	
September 9, 1993	43	23	28	3	3	Environics	—	—	
September 9, 1993	32	28	36	—	—	Angus Reid	—	—	
Official call of federal elections (September 8, 1993)

==== In 1993 (before the election campaign) ====
Last day of survey	BQ	LPC	PC	NDP	Other	Polling firm	Sample	ME	Source
September 3, 1993	43	23	28	3	3	Environics	—	—	
August 24, 1993	40	31	24	4	1	CROP	1,001	± 3.1	PDF
August 16, 1993	28	19	47	5	1	Gallup	—	± 6.0	PDF
August 5, 1993	26	30	36	—	—	Angus Reid	—	—	PDF
July 13, 1993	33	33	29	4	—	Gallup	—	± 6.0	PDF
June 28, 1993	29	30	33	—	—	Angus Reid	—	—	PDF
Kim Campbell becomes Prime Minister of Canada (June 25, 1993)
June 22, 1993	40	25	22	5	—	Léger	1,005	± 3.1	
June 21, 1993	35	31	26	8	0	CROP	1,046	—	PDF
June 17, 1993	34	22	35	4	5	SOM	—	—	PDF
May 18, 1993	40	30	21	8	1	CROP	1,005	—	PDF
April 19, 1993	36	27	26	10	1	SOM	1,020	± 3.9	PDF
April 19, 1993	34	24	38	5	0	SOM	1,020	± 3.9	PDF
April 19, 1993	35	24	31	9	1	SOM	1,020	± 3.9	PDF
April 2, 1993	25	17	52	3	—	Gallup	—	—	PDF
April 2, 1993	26	19	52	—	—	Gallup	—	—	PDF
March 15, 1993	35	32	28	4	—	Gallup	267	± 6.1	PDF
Brian Mulroney announces that he is leaving politics (February 24, 1993)
February 16, 1993	43	24	15	10	8	SOM	1,013	± 3.8	PDF
February 15, 1993	16	49	21	11	—	Gallup	535	± 4.3	PDF
January 30, 1993	33	37	—	—	—	Angus Reid	—	± 5.0	
November 25, 1992	43	29	13	12	1	CROP	1,000	± 3.0	PDF
November 16, 1992	33	40	19	6	—	Gallup	—	—	PDF
November 8, 1992	47	23	19	11	—	SOM	961	± 3.9	PDF
Charlottetown Accord is rejected by referendum (October 26, 1992)
September 14, 1992	37	34	18	9	—	Gallup	—	—	
July 11, 1992	32	33	21	11	—	Gallup	—	—	PDF
June 14, 1992	41	28	16	13	2	CROP	1,028	± 3.0	PDF
May 26, 1992	29	29	19	20	3	Angus Reid	—	—	
April 11, 1992	35	29	15	—	—	Gallup	280	± 7.0	PDF
March 7, 1992	40	30	14	16	—	IQOP	1,002	± 3.0	PDF
March 7, 1992	43	31	13	8	—	Gallup	284	± 7.0	PDF
February 5, 1992	33	32	20	12	3	Angus Reid	—	—	
January 11, 1992	32	38	15	12	—	Gallup	259	± 7.0	PDF
December 7, 1991	41	28	18	8	—	Gallup	—	—	PDF
November 17, 1991	38	29	14	18	—	CROP	1,018	—	PDF
November 9, 1991	42	25	16	15	—	Gallup	—	± 5.9	PDF
September 12, 1991	42	27	15	17	—	IQOP	1,002	± 3.0	PDF
September 11, 1991	35	25	19	15	—	Angus Reid	—	—	PDF
September 7, 1991	32	34	19	13	—	Gallup	—	—	PDF
June 8, 1991	40	28	15	13	4	Gallup	—	—	
May 7, 1991	33	21	21	18	—	Angus Reid	—	—	
May 4, 1991	36	34	13	13	4	Gallup	—	—	
April 21, 1991	37	29	14	17	—	CROP	1,019	± 3.0	PDF
April 13, 1991	41	26	16	11	5	Gallup	—	—	PDF
March 9, 1991	29	38	15	—	—	Gallup	—	—	PDF
February 23, 1991	36	30	18	14	—	Environics	398	± 5.0	PDF
February 18, 1991	35	32	15	17	2	CROP	1,022	± 3.0	PDF
February 9, 1991	23	37	22	17	—	Gallup	—	—	PDF
January 5, 1991	26	31	17	23	3	Gallup	—	—	
December 16, 1990	37	30	14	18	2	CROP	1,015	± 3.0	PDF
December 8, 1990	32	27	19	19	—	Gallup	—	—	PDF
November 14, 1990	40	30	12	19	—	IQOP	—	—	PDF
November 2, 1990	39	23	17	20	—	Lepage	961	± 3.0	PDF
October 22, 1990	32	26	16	23	2	CROP	1,019	± 3.0	PDF
October 13, 1990	19	34	26	16	2	Gallup	270	± 6.0	PDF
September 19, 1990	14	29	32	23	2	Angus Reid	1,504	± 2.5	
Gilles Duceppe is elected independent member in the by-election of Laurier—Sainte-Marie (August 13, 1990)
August 11, 1990	22	35	29	14	—	Gallup	—	—	PDF
July 14, 1990	–	39	34	19	—	Gallup	—	—	PDF
Start of Oka Crisis (July 11, 1990)
Failure to ratify Meech Lake Accord (June 22, 1990)
June 18, 1990	–	40	29	23	7	CROP	1,004	± 3.0	PDF
June 16, 1990	–	50	27	12	—	Gallup	—	—	PDF
June 12, 1990	–	35	41	—	—	Angus Reid	—	± 4.5	
Lucien Bouchard resigns from his post as minister and leaves the Conservative caucus (May 22, 1990)
May 5, 1990	–	48	26	—	—	Gallup	—	—	
April 29, 1990	–	41	24	33	2	Sorécom	1,003	± 3.0	PDF
April 7, 1990	–	50	23	20	—	Gallup	—	—	
March 26, 1990	–	41	29	26	4	Sorécom	965	± 3.0	PDF
March 21, 1990	–	50	28	18	5	CROP	—	—	PDF
March 10, 1990	–	52	23	19	—	Gallup	—	—	PDF
February 19, 1990	–	39	31	28	—	Sorécom	966	± 3.0	PDF
Phil Edmonston becomes the first NDP member elected In Quebec during a by-election in Chambly (February 12, 1990)
February 10, 1990	–	50	25	22	—	Gallup	—	—	PDF
January 13, 1990	–	49	29	13	—	Gallup	—	—	PDF

==== In 1989 ====
Last day of survey	LPC	PC	NDP	Other	Polling firm	Sample	ME	Source
December 18, 1989	36	36	26	2	Sorecom	936	± 3.1	PDF
November 19, 1989	35	40	23	3	Sorecom	1,018	± 3.0	PDF
November 11, 1989	42	41	—	—	Gallup	—	—	
October 22, 1989	35	37	24	3	Sorecom	1,005	—	PDF
Quebec general election (September 25, 1989)
September 9, 1989	51	32	15	2	Gallup	—	—	
August 26, 1989	30	38	30	—	Sorecom	1,000	—	PDF
July 8, 1989	36	44	16	4	Gallup	—	—	
June 26, 1989	36	37	25	—	Sorecom	940	—	PDF
June 21, 1989	49	36	14	—	Environics	—	—	
June 18, 1989	40	29	23	7	CROP	1,004	—	PDF
May 30, 1989	39	35	25	—	Sorécom	986	—	PDF
May 25, 1989	40	32	26	22	CROP	1,001	± 3.0	PDF
April 30, 1989	29	44	25	—	Sorécom	993	—	PDF
March 25, 1989	33	46	19	—	Environics	—	—	
March 21, 1989	50	28	18	5	CROP	—	—	PDF
Election 1988	30.3	52.7	14.4	2.6				

=== In Ontario ===
Evolution of voting intentions in Ontario
center
Last day of survey	LPC	Reform	PC	NDP	Other	Polling firm	Sample	ME	Source
Voting results	52.9	20.1	17.6	6.0	3.4				
October 20, 1993	56	21	18	3	3	Gallup	—	—	PDF
October 20, 1993	55	18	19	7	1	Angus Reid	—	± 4.0	
October 14, 1993	51	19	22	7	1	Comquest	—	—	PDF
October 6, 1993	48	20	24	—	—	Angus Reid	—	± 4.5	
September 23, 1993	44	13	31	8	—	Gallup	—	—	PDF
September 23, 1993	50	—	27	4	—	Léger	—	—	PDF
September 22, 1993	46	12	34	6	—	CROP	—	—	PDF
September 9, 1993	45	11	34	8	2	Angus Reid	—	—	
Official call of federal elections (September 8, 1993)
September 3, 1993	37	13	38	10	2	Environics	—	—	
July 13, 1993	50	9	31	8	—	Gallup	—	—	PDF
April 17, 1993	47	10	34	9	0	Gallup	1,040	—	PDF
November 16, 1992	53	11	22	14	—	Gallup	—	—	PDF
May 26, 1992	45	12	21	20	2	Angus Reid	—	—	
February 5, 1992	45	14	14	25	2	Angus Reid	—	—	
June 8, 1991	45	18	14	21	2	Gallup	—	—	
May 7, 1991	37	17	15	12	—	Angus Reid	—	—	
May 4, 1991	39	13	15	32	1	Gallup	—	—	
March 9, 1991	40	—	17	38	—	Gallup	—	—	
February 9, 1991	34	6	16	42	2	Gallup	—	—	
January 5, 1991	30	3	8	56	—	Gallup	—	—	
November 19, 1990	32	8	12	43	5	Environics	—	—	
The NDP led by Bob Rae wins a majority government (September 6, 1990)
August 11, 1990	54	—	18	25	—	Gallup	—	—	
July 14, 1990	61	—	15	22	—	Gallup	—	—	PDF
May 5, 1990	52	—	16	25	—	Gallup	—	—	
April 7, 1990	54	—	13	27	—	Gallup	—	—	
February 10, 1990	56	—	17	26	—	Gallup	—	—	
December 21, 1989	48	—	19	30	—	Angus Reid	—	—	
November 11, 1989	50	—	23	24	—	Gallup	—	—	
October 5, 1989	46	—	36	13	—	Gallup	—	—	
September 9, 1989	47	—	27	24	—	Gallup	—	—	
June 21, 1989	40	—	31	27	—	Environics	—	—	
March 25, 1989	38	—	34	25	—	Environics	—	—	
Election 1988	38.9	–	38.2	20.1	2.8				

=== In the Prairies ===
Evolution of voting intentions in Prairies (Manitoba and Saskatchewan)
Last day of survey	LPC	Reform	PC	NDP	Other	Polling firm	Sample	ME	Source
October 20, 1993	43	22	19	13	3	Angus Reid	—	± 7.0	
October 14, 1993	55	16	15	15	0	Comquest	—	± 9.3	PDF
October 6, 1993	34	20	21	21	—	Angus Reid	—	± 10.0	
January 30, 1993	38	4	—	35	—	Angus Reid	—	± 9.5	

=== In Alberta ===
Evolution of voting intentions in Alberta
Last day of survey	LPC	Reform	PC	NDP	Other	Polling firm	Sample	ME	Source
Voting results	25.1	52.3	14.6	4.1	3.9				
October 20, 1993	30	46	18	4	3	Angus Reid	—	± 4.5	
October 14, 1993	30	41	24	—	—	Comquest	—	± 8.4	PDF
October 6, 1993	25	45	21	—	—	Angus Reid	—	± 6.0	
September 22, 1993	25	30	35	—	—	CROP	—	—	PDF
Official call of federal elections (September 8, 1993)
September 3, 1993	24	25	41	9	2	Environics	—	—	
August 5, 1993	33	24	35	—	—	Angus Reid	—	—	PDF
January 30, 1993	39	21	22	—	—	Angus Reid	—	± 9.0	
Election 1988	13.7	15.4	51.8	17.4	1.7				

=== In British Columbia ===
Evolution of voting intentions in British Columbia
Last day of survey	LPC	Reform	PC	NDP	Other	Polling firm	Sample	ME	Source
Voting results	28.1	36.4	13.5	15.5	6.5				
October 20, 1993	29	34	16	15	5	Gallup	—	—	PDF
October 20, 1993	33	33	15	16	2	Angus Reid	—	± 4.5	
October 14, 1993	31	26	25	13	5	Comquest	—	± 5.9	PDF
October 6, 1993	24	36	19	13	—	Angus Reid	—	± 4.5	
September 25, 1993	30	30	24	13	—	Gallup	—	—	PDF
September 23, 1993	17	32	30	—	—	Léger	—	—	PDF
September 22, 1993	17	29	26	—	—	CROP	—	—	PDF
Official call of federal elections (September 8, 1993)
August 16, 1993	35	15	29	17	4	Gallup	—	—	PDF
August 5, 1993	35	—	28	—	—	Angus Reid	—	—	PDF
July 13, 1993	37	13	39	8	3	Gallup	—	—	PDF
April 17, 1993	36	20	19	—	—	Gallup	1,040	—	PDF
January 30, 1993	38	14	—	27	—	Angus Reid	—	± 8.0	
May 26, 1992	30	20	16	29	5	Angus Reid	—	—	
February 5, 1992	34	25	7	33	1	Angus Reid	—	—	
June 8, 1991	22	20	18	34	6	Gallup	—	—	
May 7, 1991	—	30	—	30	—	Angus Reid	—	—	
March 9, 1991	30	14	18	38	0	Gallup	—	—	
February 9, 1991	24	15	15	44	2	Gallup	—	—	
August 11, 1990	37	17	—	28	—	Gallup	—	—	
July 14, 1990	38	20	8	33	1	Gallup	—	—	PDF
May 5, 1990	32	—	11	50	—	Gallup	—	—	
February 10, 1990	23	4	22	46	5	Gallup	—	—	
November 11, 1989	25	—	16	45	14	Gallup	—	—	
October 5, 1989	29	—	26	42	3	Gallup	—	—	
Election 1988	20.4	4.8	35.3	37.0	2.5				
