= Libertarian Party of Canada candidates in the 1993 Canadian federal election =

Listing of the candidates

The Libertarian Party of Canada ran a number of candidates in the 1993 federal election, none of whom were elected. Information about these candidates may be found here.

== Quebec ==
Vaudreuil: Neal Ford:

Neal Ford was 28 years old and working in international trade as a food broker when he ran for the Libertarian Party of Canada in the 1993 Canadian General election in the riding of Vaudreuil. He campaigned under the banner of "Lower Taxes and Less Government" and leaned toward Ayn Rand's philosophy of objectivism. On a shoestring budget, he managed to run a highly visible campaign calling for a vast reduction in the size and scope of government, reduction of the deficit and national debt in part by cutting government programs and spending drastically and selling off crown corporations and land, and with it ending costly government red tape which impeded entrepreneurship, and reducing taxes to a point where they could sustain the only valid federal government functions, namely maintaining an armed forces to protect us from invasion from without, and a system of objective laws and courts to prosecute crimes where violence force and fraud were involved and to arbitrates where private means of arbitration failed, and a police system to protect citizens from force and fraud and enforce objective laws. He maintained a pro-life stance, believing that all rights are rooted in the sanctity of the right to life, which begins at conception and continued until natural death and that all rights stand or fall on that right, which may not be deprived of any individual except in self defense. He opposed Capital Punishment. He was and remains a staunch opponent of the Goods and Services tax (now HST-Harmonized Sales tax) imposed by the Mulroney Government. He finished 6th in a field of 7 with 438 votes.

== Ontario ==
=== Brant: Helmut Kurmis ===
Helmut Kurmis has been a Libertarian Party candidate in two federal elections and one provincial election. He described himself as an industrial project co-ordinator in 1988 and as an unemployed draftsman in 1993. In 2000, he was elected to a three-year term on the Ontario Libertarian Party's ethics committee.

Electoral record
Election	Division	Party	Votes	%	Place	Winner
1988 federal	Brant	Libertarian	95	0.2	6/7	Derek Blackburn, New Democratic Party
1990 provincial	Brantford	Libertarian	158	0.4	6/6	Brad Ward, New Democratic Party
1993 federal	Brant	Libertarian	258	0.5	7/9	Jane Stewart, Liberal

=== Parkdale—High Park: Haig Baronikian ===
Baronikian was raised the Parkdale—High Park riding. He has a Master of Education degree and a Ph.D., and is listed as a Professional Engineer. He did not actively campaign in the 1993 election (Toronto Star, 22 October 1993), and received 264 votes (0.64%) to finish eighth against Liberal incumbent Jesse Flis.

He later participated in the 2002 "Good Health through Good Governance" working group, which contributed a submission for the Commission on the Future of Health Care in Canada. Baronikian has worked with the E-learning group Canarie, and co-founded grayfox INSTITUTE for IT and Telecom Professionals in 2004.

=== Scarborough—Rouge River: David Kenny ===
Kenny has campaigned for the Libertarian Party of Canada and the Libertarian Party of Ontario on a total of three occasions. A newspaper report from the 1988 federal election lists him as a thirty-five-year-old sheet metal worker, while a report from the 1990 provincial election indicates that he worked at De Havilland. He argued that all of the major parties favoured higher taxes and an erosion of civil liberties. In 1993, he called for a flat tax at 20% of income and the repeal of motorcycle helmet and seat belt laws.

Electoral record
Election	Division	Party	Votes	%	Place	Winner
1988 federal	York Centre	Lbt	683		4/4	Robert Kaplan, Liberal
1990 provincial	Downsview	Lbt	619	2.6	4/4	Anthony Perruzza, New Democratic Party
1993 federal	Scarborough—Rouge River	Lbt	364		5/9	Derek Lee, Liberal

=== St. Paul's: Rick Stenhouse ===
Stenhouse is an entrepreneur in Toronto, and a prominent figure in the city's LGBT community. He graduated from the Food and Hotel Administration course at the University of Guelph in 1976, and opened Crispins restaurant two years later (Globe and Mail, 13 October 1979). He was later part of a group that purchased Toronto's Bourbon Street jazz club in August 1983 (Globe and Mail, 20 February 1984). Stenhouse purchased the Selby Hotel in 1984, and turned its downstairs bars and its courtyard into prominent locations for Toronto's gay community. He sold the chain to Howard Johnson's in 1999, and the bars and courtyard were closed the following year.

Stenhouse was one of seven men arrested in the 1981 Toronto bathhouse raid, a landmark event in Toronto's gay community. The charges against him included owning a "common bawdy house and possessing and selling obscene matter" (Globe and Mail, 23 April 1981). He pleaded guilty to the latter charge, and was fined $2,000 (Globe and Mail, 26 September 1984). An article from 1986 lists Stenhouse as owning three gay bars in Toronto (Globe and Mail, 10 June 1986).

His 1993 campaign was focused on support for government downsizing (Toronto Star, 22 October 1993). He received 108 votes (0.21%), finishing ninth against Liberal candidate Barry Campbell.
