= National Party of Canada candidates in the 1993 Canadian federal election =

The National Party of Canada ran a number of candidates in the 1993 federal election, none of whom were elected. Information about these candidates may be found here.

== Ontario ==
=== Kingston and the Islands: Chris Papadopoulos ===
Papadopoulos was twenty-seven years old at the time of the election. He was a graduate of Queen's University in Kingston, and was an unemployed teacher (Kingston Whig-Standard, 3 October 1993). He received 1,768 votes (3.08%), finishing fifth against Liberal incumbent Peter Milliken.

=== Markham—Whitchurch-Stouffville: Sheldon Bergson ===
Bergson was a university student living in Thornhill. He received 973 votes (1.26%), finishing fifth against Liberal candidate Jag Bhaduria. Years later, Bergson changed his name to Above Znoneofthe and since 2016 has run in several by-elections as an independent or member of other minor parties.

=== Nickel Belt: Brian Woods ===
Brian Woods described himself as a businessman. He received 346 votes (0.78%), finishing fifth against Liberal candidate Ray Bonin.

=== Parkdale—High Park: Stephen A. Biega ===
Biega described himself as a small-business consultant and entrepreneur, said he was running to restore "integrity, openness, accountability and real democracy in government", and spoke of preserving the distinctive community in his riding (Toronto Star, 22 October 1993). He received 1,320 votes (3.21%), finishing fifth against Liberal incumbent Jesse Flis.

=== Parry Sound-Muskoka: John Marshall ===
John Marshall identified as a systems programmer. He received 581 votes (1.26%), finishing fifth against Liberal candidate Andy Mitchell.

=== St. Paul's: Mario Godlewski ===
Godlewski worked as a teacher at Park Public School in Toronto (Toronto Star, 16 January 1988), and served as vice-president of the Toronto Teachers Federation (Globe and Mail, 26 June 1980). Also a human rights activity, Godlewski called for a national cultural strategy in the 1993 campaign (Toronto Star, 22 October 1993). He received 1,259 votes (2.46%), finishing fifth against Liberal candidate Barry Campbell.

== Manitoba ==
=== Eldon Obach (Brandon—Souris) ===
Obach worked in farm equipment sales. He received 336 votes (0.91%), for a sixth-place finish against Liberal candidate Glen McKinnon.

=== Mel Christian (Portage—Interlake) ===
Christian was a businessman in Stonewall. He received 935 votes (2.62%), finishing fifth against Liberal candidate Jon Gerrard. In 1995, he spoke against a private-sector effort to harmonize customs and immigration laws between Canada and the United States of America.

Christian and Phyllis Abbe delivered a presentation before the Canadian Radio-Television and Telecommunications Commission (CRTC) in 1999, supporting sustained funding for Canadian culture and the Canadian Broadcasting Corporation.

=== Shirley Loewen (Winnipeg South) ===
Loewen is married to Bill Loewen, a prominent Winnipeg businessman and former president of the National Party (Globe and Mail, 4 September 1993). She is herself a prominent community figure, having served as school board chairman in the Seine River district of Winnipeg during the 1980s (Globe and Mail, 5 July 1986). The Loewens were named as Winnipeg's arts supporters of the year in May 1993, following significant financial donations to the city's cultural community (Winnipeg Free Press, 27 May 1993).

Shirley Loewen was 56 years old at the time of the election, and campaigned on a platform of preserving social programs and abrogating Canada's Free Trade Agreement with the United States (Winnipeg Free Press, 29 September 1993). She received 2,512 votes (4.80%), finishing fourth against Liberal candidate Reg Alcock.

The National Party split in 1994, and the Loewens led a splinter group that recognized Richard Loeb as party leader. At one stage in this dispute, Shirley Loewen, along with two other dissident members, were escorted out of the building by security officers, after making a scene while entering the office tower lobby where the national executive were holding a meeting. This split contributed to the party's disintegration later in 1994, despite efforts by both sides to affect a reconciliation (Winnipeg Free Press, 7 December 1994).

The Loewens continued their philanthropic work after the National Party's collapse. In 1999, they were recognized for preserving Manitoba's French Canadian and Metis heritage (Winnipeg Free Press, 17 May 1999). Shirley Loewen has recently served as president of the St. Norbert Arts Centre. She was at the centre of controversy in 2003 when she laid off all of the centre's employees, choosing to adopt a fee-for-service system with local artists. Loewen defended her decision in a letter to the editor, noting that the centre has historically had a low percentage of public funding (Winnipeg Free Press, 13 December 2003).

She donated $700 to New Democratic Party candidate Judy Wasylycia-Leis's federal campaign in 2004 (Winnipeg Free Press, 13 June 2004).

=== Paul Reid (Winnipeg St. James) ===
Backed by an active Constituency Association, Reid had a strong showing in the 1993 federal election taking 3.9% of the vote in the St. James riding. Following the election Reid was elected to the National Council of the party as a Member-at-Large at a raucous and divisive national convention in Vancouver.

During a National Council meeting in Toronto, which was attended by many interested Party members, it was clear that a faction led by Daniel Whetung sought to take control of the party from the elected members and oust several members of the Executive and Council. A strong supporter of proper democratic procedure within the party, Reid sided with the majority of the party's Executive. Whetung and others of his faction threatened several members of the National Council with lawsuits should they fail to support the faction. As it was clear that the National Party was divided, a motion to dissolve the party was raised. Reid gave his primary reason for voting for the dissolution of the party as his refusal to ask members to fund a party whose primary activity would be defending itself in court.

With the resignation of Mel Hurtig from the Leadership, Reid was named Leader of the party. Elections Canada accepted Reid as Leader which resulted in a series of lawsuits in the Federal Court by Whetung et al. against the Chief Electoral Officer, Reid and William Stephenson the party's president. The Whetung challenge failed and the actions of the legitimate Executive were upheld. Reid carried out the wishes of the National Council and formally requested of the Chief Electoral Officer the removal of the party from the federal registry.

=== Marnie Johnston (Winnipeg—Transcona) ===
Johnston was an articling law student. She said that she agreed to run for the National Party to "offer voters an alternative and begin building a base of support in the riding". She received 900 votes (2.18%), finishing fifth against New Democratic Party incumbent Bill Blaikie.

== Alberta ==
=== Mel Hurtig (Edmonton Northwest) ===
See Main article about Mel Hurtig, party leader.

Electoral record
Election	Division	Party	Votes	%	Place	Winner
1972 federal	Edmonton West	Liberal	21,040	35.6	2/4	Marcel Lambert, Progressive Conservative
1993 federal	Edmonton Northwest	National	4507	12.8	3/8	Anne McLellan, Liberal

=== Lea Russell (Calgary Southwest) ===
Russell had previously campaigned for the Alberta Liberal Party in the 1986 provincial election. She is a dental hygienist in private life. During the mid-2000s, she began working to provide dental services to Calgary's homeless population.

Electoral record
Election	Division	Party	Votes	%	Place	Winner
1986 provincial	Calgary-Fish Creek	Liberal	1,553	?	3/3	Bill Payne, Progressive Conservative
1993 federal	Calgary Southwest	National	910	1.34	5/9	Preston Manning, Reform

=== Kathleen McNeil (Calgary West) ===
McNeil was a 25-year-old student at Mount Royal College in Calgary during the election (Calgary Herald, 7 October 1993). She received 1,068 votes (1.85%), finishing fifth against Reform Party candidate Stephen Harper.
