= Official Opposition Shadow Cabinet of the 45th Parliament of Canada =

Official Opposition shadow cabinet of Canada since 2025

Shadow Cabinet of the 45th Parliament of Canada
- Official Opposition Shadow Cabinet of Canada
- 2025 – present
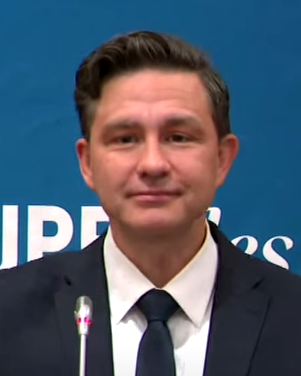
- Date formed: May 21, 2025

People and organizations
- Monarch: Charles III
- Opposition Leader: Andrew Scheer (May–August 2025); Pierre Poilievre (August 2025–present)
- Deputy Opposition Leaders: Melissa Lantsman; Tim Uppal
- Opposition House Leader: Andrew Scheer
- Member party: Conservative
- Status in legislature: Official Opposition 139 / 343

History
- Election: 2025
- Legislature term: 45th Canadian Parliament
- Predecessor: Official Opposition Shadow Cabinet of the 44th Parliament

The Official Opposition Shadow Cabinet of the 45th Parliament of Canada was appointed by the Leader of the Conservative Party Pierre Poilievre after the 2025 Canadian federal election, on 21 May 2025. It is composed of Conservative members of Parliament to provide parliamentary opposition to Mark Carney's Liberal government frontbench. Because Poilievre was unseated in the 2025 election, Andrew Scheer led the frontbench team as the parliamentary leader of the Conservatives and leader of the Opposition until Poilievre's return to Parliament through a by-election in Battle River—Crowfoot. On 30 June 2026, Poilievre reshuffled his shadow cabinet.

== Arrangements ==
=== Poilievre IV (June 2026 – present) ===
- Pierre Poilievre – Leader of the Opposition and Leader of the Conservative Party
- Scott Aitchison – Shadow Minister for Housing
- Dan Albas – Shadow Minister for Transport
- Carol Anstey – Shadow Minister for Energy and Natural Resources
- Mel Arnold – Associate Shadow Minister for Fisheries
- Roman Baber – Shadow Minister for Civil Liberties
- Tony Baldinelli – Shadow Minister for Tourism
- John Barlow – Shadow Minister for Agriculture and Agri-Food
- Michael Barrett – Shadow Minister for Veterans Affairs
- Luc Berthold – Deputy House Leader
- James Bezan – Shadow Minister for National Defence
- Richard Bragdon – Shadow Minister for Atlantic Economic Development
- Blaine Calkins – Shadow Minister for Hunting, Fishing and Conservation
- Frank Caputo – Shadow Minister for Public Safety
- Adam Chambers – Shadow Minister for Innovation, Science and Industry
- Michael Chong – Shadow Minister for Finance
- Sandra Cobena – Shadow Minister for Treasury Board & The King's Privy Council
- Connie Cody – Associate Shadow Minister for Ethics and Accountable Government
- Michael Cooper – Shadow Minister for Democratic Reform
- Raquel Dancho – Shadow Minister for Health
- Scot Davidson – Shadow Minister for Red Tape Reduction
- Gérard Deltell – Shadow Minister for Intergovernmental Affairs, One Canadian Economy and Interprovincial Trade
- Kelly DeRidder – Shadow Minister for Women and Gender Equality
- Todd Doherty – Shadow Minister for Addictions
- Eric Duncan – Shadow Minister for Foreign Affairs
- Dave Epp – Shadow Minister for Rural Development
- Rosemarie Falk – Associate Shadow Minister for Families, Children and Social Development
- Bernard Généreux – Associate Shadow Minister for Official Languages
- Garnett Genuis – Shadow Minister for Employment
- Harb Gill – Shadow Minister for Federal Economic Development Agency for Eastern, Central and Southern Ontario (with Responsibility for the Auto Sector)
- Joël Godin – Shadow Minister for Official Languages
- Laila Goodridge – Shadow Minister for Families, Children and Social Development
- Jacques Gourde – Associate Shadow Minister for Agriculture and Agri-Food
- Jason Groleau – Shadow Minister for Economic Development Agency of Canada for the Regions of Quebec & Associate Shadow Minister for Innovation, Science and Industry
- Aaron Gunn – Shadow Minister for Ethics and Accountable Government
- Jasraj Hallan – Shadow Minister for National Revenue
- Gabriel Hardy – Shadow Minister for Youth
- Leo Housakos – Leader of the Opposition in the Senate
- Tamara Jansen – Shadow Minister for Pacific Economic Development
- Pat Kelly – Shadow Minister for Prairie Economic Development & Economic Advisor to the Leader
- Arpan Khanna – Shadow Minister for Justice & Attorney General of Canada & National Outreach Chair
- Jeff Kibble – Shadow Minister for Defence Procurement
- Rhonda Kirkland – Associate Shadow Minister for Public Safety
- Shelby Kramp-Neuman – Special Advisor for Ontario
- Tamara Kronis – Shadow Minister for Supply Chain Issues & Chair of the Food Affordability Task Force
- Ned Kuruc – Shadow Minister for Sport
- Stephanie Kusie – Shadow Minister for International Trade
- Mike Lake – Shadow Minister for Mental Health and Wellness
- Melissa Lantsman – Deputy Leader of the Conservative Party
- Philip Lawrence – Shadow Minister for International Development
- Éric Lefebvre – Associate Shadow Minister for Finance
- Leslyn Lewis – Shadow Minister for Digital Government and Artificial Intelligence
- Dane Lloyd – National Security Advisor and Referendum Lead for Alberta
- Gaétan Malette – Associate Shadow Minister for Natural Resources (Mining and Forestry)
- Shuvaloy Majumdar – Shadow Minister for Canada-US Relations
- Jacob Mantle – Associate Shadow Minister for Foreign Affairs
- Dan Mazier – Shadow Minister for Government Transformation, Public Works and Procurement
- Eric Melillo – Shadow Minister for Federal Economic Development Agency for Northern Ontario
- Rob Moore – Deputy Whip
- Billy Morin – Shadow Minister for Indigenous Services
- Dan Muys – Associate Shadow Minister for Transport
- Brad Redekopp – Associate Shadow Minister for Immigration, Refugees and Citizenship
- Michelle Rempel Garner – Shadow Minister for Immigration, Refugees and Citizenship
- Colin Reynolds – Associate Shadow Minister for Labour
- Blake Richards – Shadow Minister for Emergency Preparedness and Community Resilience
- Anna Roberts – Shadow Minister for Seniors
- Lianne Rood – Question Period Coordinator
- Ellis Ross – Shadow Minister for Environment and Climate Change
- Andrew Scheer – House Leader
- Jamie Schmale – Shadow Minister for Crown-Indigenous Relations
- Kyle Seeback – Shadow Minister for Labour
- Doug Shipley – Associate Shadow Minister for Justice & Attorney General of Canada
- Clifford Small – Shadow Minister for Fisheries
- Warren Steinley – Caucus-Party Liaison
- Mark Strahl – Special Advisor for British Columbia
- Shannon Stubbs – Shadow Minister for Infrastructure (with Responsibility for the Alberta MOU, Pipeline and Pathways Project)
- Rachael Thomas – Shadow Minister for Canadian Identity and Culture
- Corey Tochor – Associate Shadow Minister for Energy and Natural Resources (Nuclear)
- Fraser Tolmie – Associate Shadow Minister for Veterans Affairs
- Tim Uppal – Deputy Leader of the Conservative Party
- Brad Vis – Shadow Minister for Small Business
- Chris Warkentin – Chief Opposition Whip
- Bob Zimmer – Shadow Minister for Arctic Affairs & Canadian Northern Economic Development

=== Poilievre III (August 2025 – June 2026) ===
| Shadow Minister | Portfolios | Portrait |
|---|---|---|
| Pierre Poilievre MP (Battle River—Crowfoot) | Leader of the Opposition | |
| Melissa Lantsman MP (Thornhill) | Deputy Leader of the Opposition; Deputy Leader of the Conservative Party of Canada | |
| Tim Uppal MP (Edmonton Gateway) | Deputy Leader of the Opposition; Deputy Leader of the Conservative Party of Canada | |
| Senator Leo Housakos (Quebec) | Leader of the Opposition in the Senate | |
| Stephanie Kusie MP (Calgary Midnapore) | Shadow President of the Treasury Board; Shadow President of the King's Privy Council for Canada | |
| Jamie Schmale MP (Haliburton—Kawartha Lakes) | Shadow Minister of Crown–Indigenous Relations | |
| Michael Chong MP (Wellington—Halton Hills) | Shadow Minister of Foreign Affairs | |
| Frank Caputo MP (Kamloops—Thompson—Cariboo) | Shadow Minister of Public Safety | |
| Jasraj Singh Hallan MP (Calgary East) | Shadow Minister of Finance | |
| Bob Zimmer MP (Prince George—Peace River—Northern Rockies) | Shadow Minister of Northern Affairs; Shadow Minister for the Canadian Northern Economic Development Agency | |
| Ellis Ross MP (Skeena—Bulkley Valley) | Shadow Minister of Environment and Climate Change | |
| Larry Brock MP (Brantford—Brant) | Shadow Minister of Justice and Attorney General of Canada; Shadow Minister for the purposes of the Atlantic Canada Opportunities Agency Act | |
| Billy Morin MP (Edmonton Northwest) | Shadow Minister of Indigenous Services | |
| Michael Cooper MP (St. Albert—Sturgeon River) | Shadow Minister for Democratic Reform | |
| Rachael Thomas MP (Lethbridge) | Shadow Minister of Canadian Identity and Culture | |
| John Barlow MP (Foothills) | Shadow Minister of Agriculture and Agri-Food | |
| Shannon Stubbs MP (Lakeland) | Shadow Minister of Energy and Natural Resources | |
| Shelby Kramp-Neuman MP (Hastings—Lennox and Addington—Tyendinaga) | Shadow Minister for Canada-US Trade | |
| Ben Lobb MP (Huron—Bruce) | Shadow Minister for Digital Government and Artificial Intelligence | |
| Todd Doherty MP (Cariboo—Prince George) | Shadow Minister for Addictions | |
| Dane Lloyd MP (Parkland) | Shadow Minister of Emergency Preparedness and Community Resilience | |
| Michael Barrett MP (Leeds—Grenville—Thousand Islands—Rideau Lakes) | Shadow Minister for Ethics and Accountable Government | |
| Eric Melillo MP (Kenora—Kiiwetinoong) | Shadow Minister responsible for the Federal Economic Development Agency for Northern Ontario | |
| Clifford Small MP (Central Newfoundland) | Shadow Minister of Fisheries | |
| Kelly Block MP (Saskatoon—Rosetown—Biggar) | Shadow Minister of Government Transformation, Public Works and Procurement | |
| Gérard Deltell MP (Louis-Saint-Laurent—Akiawenhrahk) | Shadow Minister for Revenue | |
| Scott Aitchison MP (Parry Sound—Muskoka) | Shadow Minister for Housing | |
| Garnett Genuis MP (Sherwood Park—Fort Saskatchewan) | Shadow Minister for Employment | |
| Blaine Calkins MP (Red Deer—Lacombe) | Shadow Minister for Hunting, Fishing and Conservation | |
| Michelle Rempel Garner MP (Calgary Nose Hill) | Shadow Minister of Immigration, Refugees and Citizenship | |
| Raquel Dancho MP (Kildonan—St. Paul) | Shadow Minister for Industry | |
| Leslyn Lewis MP (Haldimand—Norfolk) | Shadow Minister for Infrastructure | |
| Philip Lawrence MP (Northumberland—Clarke) | Shadow Minister of Intergovernmental Affairs and One Canadian Economy; Shadow Minister for Inter-Provincial Trade | |
| Adam Chambers MP (Simcoe North) | Shadow Minister of International Trade | |
| Dan Mazier MP (Riding Mountain) | Shadow Minister for Health | |
| Kyle Seeback MP (Dufferin—Caledon) | Shadow Minister for Labour | |
| Mike Lake MP (Edmonton—Mill Woods—Beaumont) | Shadow Minister for Mental Health and Wellness | |
| James Bezan MP (Selkirk—Interlake—Eastman) | Shadow Minister of National Defence | |
| Joël Godin MP (Portneuf—Jacques-Cartier) | Shadow Minister for Official Languages | |
| Scot Davidson MP (New Tecumseth—Gwillimbury) | Shadow Minister for Red Tape Reduction | |
| Richard Bragdon MP (Tobique—Mactaquac) | Minister for Rural Development | |
| Anna Roberts MP (King—Vaughan) | Shadow Minister for Seniors | |
| Brad Vis MP (Mission—Matsqui—Abbotsford) | Shadow Minister for Small Business | |
| Laila Goodridge MP (Fort McMurray—Cold Lake) | Shadow Minister for Social Development and Families | |
| Richard Martel MP (Chicoutimi—Le Fjord) | Shadow Minister for Sport & Economic Development Agency of Canada for the Regions of Quebec | |
| | Shadow Minister for Supply Chain Issues | |
| Tony Baldinelli MP (Niagara Falls—Niagara-on-the-Lake) | Shadow Minister for Tourism | |
| Dan Albas MP (Central Okanagan—Similkameen—Nicola) | Shadow Minister for Transport | |
| Dominique Vien MP (Bellechasse—Les Etchemins—Lévis) | Shadow Minister for Women and Gender Equality and Youth | |
| Blake Richards MP (Banff—Airdrie) | Shadow Minister of Veterans Affairs | |
| Lianne Rood MP (Middlesex—London) | Shadow Minister of International Development; Shadow Minister responsible for the Federal Economic Development Agency for Southern Ontario | |

==== Associate shadow ministers ====
| Associate Shadow Minister | Portfolios | Portrait |
|---|---|---|
| Pat Kelly MP (Calgary Rocky Ridge) | Associate Shadow Minister for Prairies Economic Development Canada; Economic Advisor to the Leader | |
| Kevin Waugh MP (Saskatoon South) | Associate Shadow Minister for Canadian Identity and Culture | |
| Jacques Gourde MP (Lévis—Lotbinière) | Associate Shadow Minister for Agriculture | |
| Mel Arnold MP (North Okanagan—Shuswap) | Associate Shadow Minister for Fisheries | |
| Brad Redekopp MP (Saskatoon West) | Associate Shadow Minister for Immigration, Refugees and Citizenship | |
| Éric Lefebvre MP (Richmond—Arthabaska) | Associate Shadow Minister for Finance | |
| Rosemarie Falk MP (Battlefords—Lloydminster—Meadow Lake) | Associate Shadow Minister for Labour | |
| Corey Tochor MP (Saskatoon—University) | Associate Shadow Minister for Natural Resources (Nuclear) | |
| Bernard Généreux MP (Côte-du-Sud—Rivière-du-Loup—Kataskomiq—Témiscouata) | Associate Shadow Minister for Official Languages | |
| Doug Shipley MP (Barrie—Springwater—Oro-Medonte) | Associate Shadow Minister for Combatting Crime | |
| Dan Muys MP (Flamborough—Glanbrook—Brant North) | Assistant Shadow Minister for Transport | |
| Fraser Tolmie MP (Moose Jaw—Lake Centre—Lanigan) | Associate Shadow Minister for Veterans Affairs | |
| Gaétan Malette MP (Kapuskasing—Timmins—Mushkegowuk) | Associate Shadow Minister for Natural Resources (Mining and Forestry) | |
| Tako van Popta MP (Langley Township—Fraser Heights) | Associate Shadow Minister for Pacific Economic Development Canada | |

==== Party management ====
| Name | Portfolios | Portrait |
|---|---|---|
| Pierre Poilievre MP (Battle River—Crowfoot) | Leader of the Conservative Party of Canada | |
| Andrew Scheer MP (Regina—Qu'Appelle) | Opposition House Leader; Leader of the Opposition (until August 2025) | |
| Chris Warkentin MP (Grande Prairie) | Chief Opposition Whip | |
| Pierre Paul-Hus MP (Charlesbourg—Haute-Saint-Charles) | Quebec lieutenant | |
| Warren Steinley MP (Regina—Lewvan) | Caucus-Party Liaison | |
| Arpan Khanna MP (Oxford) | Outreach Co-ordinator | |
| John Brassard MP (Barrie South—Innisfil) | Committee Co-ordinator | |
| Luc Berthold MP (Mégantic—L'Érable—Lotbinière) | Deputy House Leader | |
| Rob Moore MP (Fundy Royal) | Deputy Whip | |
| Mark Strahl MP (Chilliwack—Hope) | Special Advisor for British Columbia | |

=== Scheer IX (May 2025 – August 2025) ===
| Shadow Minister | Portfolios | Portrait |
|---|---|---|
| Andrew Scheer MP (Regina—Qu'Appelle) | Leader of the Opposition | |
