= Bill Loewen =

Canadian businessman, philanthropist and political activist (1930–2026)

- Born: William Herbert Loewen; July 28, 1930; Elkhorn, Manitoba, Canada
- Died: February 4, 2026 (aged 95); Winnipeg, Manitoba, Canada
- Occupations: Businessman, philanthropist, politician

William Herbert Loewen OC OM (July 28, 1930 – February 4, 2026) was a Canadian businessman, philanthropist and political figure in Winnipeg, Manitoba.

== Background ==
Loewen was born on July 28, 1930, and raised in Elkhorn, Manitoba, later moving to Winnipeg. His wife Shirley Loewen is a prominent figure in the Winnipeg arts community, and his nephew John Loewen is a former member of the Legislative Assembly of Manitoba. He was named to the Order of Canada in 1999, to the Winnipeg Citizens Hall of Fame in 2008, and to the Order of Manitoba in 2018.

Loewen died on February 4, 2026, at the age of 95.

== Businessman ==
Loewen was a chartered accountant. He launched the payroll cheque company Comcheq Services in 1968 on an investment of $15,000, and turned the company into a national success. Comcheq's revenue was $24 million in 1990, and it had 453 workers. Loewen was named Manitoba Executive of the Year in May 1990.

He sold Comcheq to the Canadian Imperial Bank of Commerce in 1992, and expressed disappointment when the CIBC sold it to an American firm in 1998. He retained control of a division called TelPay, and used this entity to secure a customer's electronic bill-paying contracts with many financial institutions including National Bank of Canada in 1999. Telpay was named "innovator of the year" by the Winnipeg Chamber of Commerce in 2004, and received the Distinguished Treasury Award from the Treasury Management Association of Canada (TMAC) the following year. He spoke against bank mergers in 1998, arguing that Canadian banks were already too large and powerful.

Winnipeg mayor Susan Thompson appointed Loewen to head the Winnipeg Millennium Committee in 1997. In this capacity, he was responsible for planning events for the city's millennium festivities.

In November 2007 he was appointed to the Canadian Payments Association Bill Payment Task Force, a committee set up to respond to complaints that bill payment processing in Canada is too slow.

On November 9, 2010 he was presented with the "Lifetime Achievement Award" by the Institute of Chartered Accountants of Manitoba.

== Political activism ==
Loewen was a vocal opponent of Canada's proposed free trade deal with the United States in 1988. He formed the Business Council for Fair Trade, and argued that the deal would undermine Canada's sovereignty. Testifying before a parliamentary committee, he said the Canadian government is "proposing a deal under which I, as a businessman, can prosper - but I must become an American to do so." Loewen supported the Liberal Party of Canada in the 1988 federal election, and appeared at a Winnipeg campaign rally with party leader John Turner. He later supported Lloyd Axworthy's aborted bid to lead the Liberal Party in 1990, and opposed plans for a North American Free Trade Agreement (NAFTA) the following year.

The Liberal Party announced its support for NAFTA in 1991. Loewen subsequently left the party, and become president of the newly formed National Party of Canada in 1992. This centre-left party supported economic nationalism, and was led by Mel Hurtig. Loewen donated $4 million for the party to run candidates in the 1993 federal election, and was himself a candidate in the riding of Winnipeg South Centre. He finished fifth against Axworthy, the Liberal candidate. The National Party did not win any seats.

The National Party suffered an internal split in 1994, with Hurtig and Loewen leading rival factions. Hurtig resigned as party leader at an acrimonious executive meeting in February 1994, but later retracted his resignation. Loewen's faction refused to recognize the retraction, and held that Kurt Loeb was the party's duly recognized interim leader. Hurtig and Loewen accused one another of undermining the party, and traded insults in the press.

The two factions went to Ontario court in March 1994, to determine which side would have access to the party's $480,000 election rebate provided by the federal government. The presiding judge determined in favour of Hurtig's faction. Loewen subsequently issued a short book entitled National Party of Canada, The First 14 Months, in which he criticized Hurtig as an autocratic leader. Hurtig subsequently defeated Loeb in an official leadership convention, at which time Loewen called for the vote to be made unanimous to demonstrate party unity. The divisions continued, however, and Hurtig resigned the leadership permanently in August 1994. The party fell apart a few weeks later.

Party members subsequently launched several legal challenges to keep the National Party, and attempted to recover $610,000 in unaccounted funds. Neither attempt appears to have been successful. He remained an opponent of the Canada-U.S. Free Trade Deal throughout the 1990s. In 1999, he appeared at a panel discussion led by Paul Hellyer of the newly formed Canadian Action Party.

== Philanthropist ==
Loewen was a prominent financial supporter of the Winnipeg Arts Community. He donated $100,000 to the Winnipeg Symphony Orchestra following government cuts in the 1990s, and served as president and chairman of its board of directors at different times. Loewen was given the orchestra's "Golden Baton Award" in 1998. He commissioned a piece commemorating the orchestra's fiftieth anniversary in 1999, and drew attention to new music from the young Manitoba composer Glenn Buhr.

He resigned from the board in June 1999, to express his displeasure over recent policy decisions. He subsequently accused the WSO leadership of financial mismanagement. He rejoined the executive in the mid-2000s, and was listed as WSO Treasurer in January 2005.

Loewen provided extensive funding to the Winnipeg Symphony Orchestra, and donated one million dollars to the Manitoba Choral Association in 1998. In 1999 and 2000, he led a successful movement to turn Winnipeg's former Bank of Commerce building into a multi-use non-profit centre. The building was reopened to the public in 2002. Loewen has also been a benefactor of "Project Loophole", a group which sought to ensure that a prominent wealthy Canadian family paid its fair share of taxes. He himself rejected suggestions that Canada's richest citizens are overtaxed.

He assisted Bud Ulrich in his efforts to start a Canadian Professional Hockey League in 1995.

In 1980 Loewen, alongside Jeanne Perrault and Jim Cameron, became one of the founding members of Heritage St. Norbert. He championed many achievements through Heritage St. Norbert ensuring that the vast history of St. Norbert is preserved and promoted within and outside of the community.
