= Shadow Cabinet of Pierre Poilievre =

The Shadow Cabinet of Pierre Poilievre may refer to...

- Official Opposition Shadow Cabinet of the 44th Parliament of Canada, Poilievre's first shadow cabinet
- Official Opposition Shadow Cabinet of the 45th Parliament of Canada, Poilievre's second shadow cabinet
