= Mel Hurtig =

Canadian publisher, author and political activist (1932–2016)

Mel Hurtig OC
- Born: 24 June 1932; Edmonton, Alberta, Canada
- Died: 3 August 2016 (aged 84); Vancouver, British Columbia, Canada
- Occupations: Publisher; author; political activist
- Title: Leader & Founder of the National Party of Canada (1993-1994)
- Political party: National Party of Canada (1993-1994)
- Other political affiliations: Liberal Party of Canada ( -1973)
- Board member of: Canadian Booksellers Association

Mel Hurtig OC (June 24, 1932 – August 3, 2016) was a Canadian publisher, author, political activist, and political candidate. He was president of the Edmonton Art Gallery. He described himself as a Canadian nationalist, while he also wrote several books critical of Canadian government policy.

== Early life and education ==
Hurtig was born in Edmonton, Alberta, on 24 June 1932. His parents were Jewish immigrants: his father from Romania and his mother from Russia. An alumnus of the Edmonton Talmud Torah, he grew up in Edmonton and graduated from high school there.

== Businessman, publisher and author ==
In 1956, at the age of 24 he opened a book store, Hurtig Books, on Jasper Avenue and 103rd Street, which later grew into a large retail book operation with three locations. His stores featured staging of plays, poetry readings, encouraged social interaction, and unusually, permitted drinking coffee.

After selling his stores in 1972, he established Hurtig Publishers Ltd. with $30,000 in borrowed money. It became "one of the liveliest book publishing companies in Canada." In 1980, he started work on The Canadian Encyclopedia, spending $12 million on a comprehensive three-volume national encyclopedia first published in 1985. A second edition, which took four years to complete and cost $8.5 million to produce, appeared in four volumes in 1988. Much to the surprise of the publisher, the second edition was unexpectedly sold at up to a 55 per cent discount by national companies, roiling the market.

In September 1990, Hurtig published the five-volume Junior Encyclopedia of Canada, the first encyclopedia for young Canadians. He sold the company to McClelland & Stewart in May 1991.

Hurtig was an Officer of the Order of Canada, was granted honorary Doctor of Laws degrees from six Canadian universities, and was the recipient of the Lester B. Pearson Man of the Year Peace Award.

== Politics ==
In 1967, Hurtig became interested in politics when the Liberal Party was looking for a new leader due to Prime Minister Pearson's impending retirement. He ended up supporting Justice Minister Pierre Trudeau's successful bid for Liberal leadership. In 1972, he ran as a Liberal in the federal riding of Edmonton West. He finished second to longtime Progressive Conservative incumbent Marcel Lambert.

In 1973, he left the Liberal Party and joined with other nationalists including Walter Gordon, Jack McClelland, and Claude Ryan to establish the Committee for an Independent Canada (CIC), which lobbied against foreign ownership of Canadian economic assets and cultural imperialism. He served as Chair for the first year of the CIC.

In 1985, Hurtig established the Council of Canadians, another nationalist organization, five years after the demise of the CIC. The primary purpose of this organization was to lobby against a perceived rising tide of support for free trade. He considered his establishment of the Council as the act he was "most proud of." He would leave in 1992 but the council survives to this day, albeit with a mission of social, environmental, and economic justice rather than nationalism.

In 1992, Hurtig was elected leader of the National Party of Canada and led it in the 1993 federal election. He ran in the riding of Edmonton Northwest, but with 4,507 votes and 12.8 per cent of the popular vote, finished a distant third to Liberal Anne McLellan. It was nonetheless the best showing of the National Party candidates in that election—notably, Hurtig was the only National Party candidate to finish ahead of an incumbent MP, namely Tory Murray Dorin.

=== Electoral record ===
1972 Canadian federal election: Edmonton West
Party	Candidate	Votes
Progressive Conservative	Marcel Lambert	29,876
Liberal	Mel Hurtig	21,040
New Democratic	John Packer	6,770
Social Credit	Donald H. McLeod	1,419

1993 Canadian federal election: Edmonton Northwest
Party	Candidate	Votes
Liberal	Anne McLellan	12,599
Reform	Richard Kayler	12,587
National	Mel Hurtig	4,507
Progressive Conservative	Murray Dorin	3,485
New Democratic	Stephanie Michaels	1,671
Natural Law	Ric Johnsen	186
Green	Roger Swan	119
No affiliation	Heide Zeeper	41

== Death ==
In 2005, Hurtig moved from Edmonton to Vancouver, British Columbia, in order to be closer to his four daughters. On 3 August 2016, he died there at a hospital, from complications from pneumonia. On the day of his death, one daughter, Leslie Hurtig, read him "newspaper headlines about the launch of the inquiry into murdered and missing women"; he responded, "Bravo", and died that afternoon, surrounded by family. In addition to his daughters, Hurtig was survived by four grandsons.

== Recognition ==
- Canadian Book Publisher of the Year, 1974 and 1981
- Made an Officer of the Order of Canada, (1980)
- Honorary LL.D degrees from York University (1980), Wilfrid Laurier University (1985), University of Lethbridge (1986), University of Alberta (1986), Concordia University (1990), University of British Columbia (1992)
- Eve Orpen Award for Publishing and Literary Excellence, 1985
- Silver Ribbon Award, City of Edmonton, 1985
- Centenary Medal, Royal Society of Canada, 1986
- Alberta Achievement Award, 1986
- Toastmasters International Communications and Leadership Award, 1986
- President's Award, Canadian Booksellers Association, 1986
- Quill Award, Windsor Press Club, 1986
- Speaker of the Year Award, Canadian Speech Communicators Association, 1986
- Corporate Citizen of the Year Award, Community of Business and Professional. Associates of Canada, 1988
- Lester B. Pearson Man of the Year Peace Award 1988
- 125th Anniversary of the Confederation of Canada Medal (1992)
- Canadian Version of the Queen Elizabeth II Golden Jubilee Medal (2002)
- Canadian Version of the Queen Elizabeth II Diamond Jubilee Medal (2012)

== Selected works ==
- Nationalism and Continentalism, 5 November 1981 speech at the Empire Club of Canada
- The Betrayal of Canada, 1991
- A New and Better Canada, policy statement for the National Party of Canada
- How to solve Canada's economic mess without raising personal taxes or increasing the debt (National Party of Canada official platform document in 1993 election).
- At Twilight in the Country/Memoirs of a Canadian Nationalist, 1996
- Pay the Rent or Feed the Kids, 2000
- The Vanishing Country, 2002
- Rushing to Armageddon, 2004
- The Truth About Canada, 2008
- The Arrogant Autocrat: Stephen Harper's Takeover of Canada, 2015
