= Canadian House of Commons Standing Committee on Government Operations and Estimates =

Standing committee of the House of Commons of Canada

The House of Commons Standing Committee on Government Operations and Estimates (OGGO) is a standing committee of the House of Commons of Canada.

== Mandate ==
- Review the effectiveness of government operations
- Review expenditure budgets of central departments and agencies
- Examine all estimates documents
- Co-ordinate cross-departmental mandates
- Approve new information and communication technologies adopted by the government
- Review statutory programs, tax expenditures, loan guaranties and contingency funds
- Regulate private foundations deriving the majority of their funding from the federal government
- Examine and conduct studies related to the following federal organizations:
  - The Privy Council Office
  - The Prime Minister's Office
  - The Treasury Board Secretariat
  - Public Works and Government Services Canada
  - The Public Services Human Resources Management Agency of Canada
  - The Canada School of Public Service
  - The Office of the Governor-General of Canada
  - The Public Service Labour Relations Board
  - The Canadian Intergovernmental Conference Secretariat
  - The Canada Lands Company
  - The Canada Mortgage and Housing Corporation
  - The Canada Post Corporation
  - Defence Construction (1951) Ltd.
  - Old Port of Montréal Corporation Inc.
  - The Public Sector Pension Investment Board
  - Queens Quay West Land Corp.
  - The Royal Canadian Mint

== Membership ==
As of the 45th Canadian Parliament:

| Party | Member | District |
|---|---|---|
| Conservative | Kelly McCauley, chair | Edmonton West, AB |
| Liberal | Iqra Khalid, vice chair | Mississauga—Erin Mills, ON |
| Bloc Québécois | Marie-Hélène Gaudreau, vice chair | Laurentides—Labelle, QC |
| Conservative | Kelly Block | Carlton Trail—Eagle Creek, SK |
| Liberal | Vince Gasparro | Eglinton—Lawrence, ON |
| Conservative | Tamara Jansen | Cloverdale—Langley City, BC |
| Conservative | Jeremy Patzer | Swift Current—Grasslands—Kindersley, SK |
| Liberal | Pauline Rochefort | Nipissing—Timiskaming, ON |
| Liberal | Jenna Sudds | Kanata, ON |

== Subcommittees ==
- Subcommittee on Agenda and Procedure (SOGG)
