= John Loewen =

Canadian politician

Member of the Legislative Assembly of Manitoba for Fort Whyte
- In office September 21, 1999 – September 26, 2005
- Preceded by: district created
- Succeeded by: Hugh McFadyen

Personal details
- Born: December 21, 1949 (age 76) Elkhorn, Manitoba, Canada
- Party: Progressive Conservative Party of Manitoba (until 2006); Liberal Party of Canada
- Relations: Bill Loewen (uncle)
- Education: University of Manitoba
- Occupation: Businessman, politician

John Loewen (/ˈleɪvɛn/; born December 21, 1949) is a businessman and politician in Manitoba, Canada. He served in the Legislative Assembly of Manitoba from 1999 to 2005 as a member of the Progressive Conservative Party, and campaigned for the House of Commons of Canada in 2006 and 2008 as a Liberal. He is the nephew of Bill and Shirley Loewen, prominent entrepreneurs and philanthropists in Winnipeg.

== Early life and career ==
Loewen was born in Elkhorn, Manitoba, and raised in Winnipeg. He received a Bachelor of Science degree from the University of Manitoba in 1973. Tall and athletic, Loewen was a prominent member of the University of Manitoba Bisons basketball team. He joined the payroll services company Comcheq Services Ltd. (now called Ceridian) in 1973. He later served as company president from 1984 until 1998.

In 1993, Loewen oversaw Comcheq's transformation into a subsidiary of the Canadian Imperial Bank of Commerce (CIBC). There were concerns that the Winnipeg company's autonomy would be undermined by the national bank, but the CIBC initially allowed it to remain fairly independent. Loewen attempted to reacquire the company in 1998, but was unsuccessful.

Loewen has for many years been a prominent figure supporting Manitoba's sports community. He developed a plan to financially support the province's Olympic athletes in the early 1990s, and helped establish the Winnipeg Thunder basketball team in 1992 with future mayor Sam Katz. He has also provided financial assistance to several athletic programs. In 1994, a newspaper columnist in Winnipeg described Comcheq as "probably the most generous private-sector supporter of elite athletes in the province".

Loewen helped create the Manitoba Entertainment Complex group (MEC) in 1994, in an effort to purchase controlling shares in the Winnipeg Jets hockey franchise and keep the team in the city. Loewen chaired the MEC, and participated in plans to build a new arena for the team. Despite his efforts, the Jets were forced to leave the city in 1996. Loewen argued that the National Hockey League and commissioner Gary Bettman undermined his efforts, by presenting unreasonable demands shortly before an official deadline. In 2006, he indicated that the major-level investors necessary for maintaining a National Hockey League franchise simply did not exist in Winnipeg in the mid-1990s.

Loewen has been a board member and chairman of Economic Development Winnipeg, a council member of the Institute of Chartered Accountants of Manitoba, a board member and president of the Big Brothers and Sisters Association of Winnipeg and president of both the Manitoba Chamber Orchestra and the Linden Woods Community Association. He has also been involved with the United Way of Winnipeg, serving on the United Way Cabinet from 1994 until 1999 as Chair of the Major Corporate Division and Deputy Chair of Business. He is a founding Director of the Business Council of Manitoba.

There were rumours that Loewen would run for Mayor of Winnipeg in 1998, but he declined.

Until 2012 John Loewen was the President of Telpay, an electronic payments company which was originally started as a research and development project by Comcheq. Telpay is the largest independent payment processing company in Canada having processed over 23 million payments worth over $14 billion in 2009.

== Provincial politics ==
Loewen entered political life in Manitoba's 1999 provincial election, winning election for the newly created south Winnipeg constituency of Fort Whyte. Running as a Progressive Conservative, he defeated New Democrat Bidhu Jha by 3,665 votes. The New Democratic Party won the election, and Loewen became a Member of the Legislative Assembly (MLA) in the Official Opposition. He was appointed as his party's critic for Intergovernmental Affairs, and was later promoted to Finance Critic. Considered a rising star in his party, there was some speculation that he would run to succeed Gary Filmon as party leader in 2000. He decided against this when the party establishment united behind Stuart Murray.

He was a moderate in the Manitoba Progressive Conservative Party, and supported the centre-right Progressive Conservative Party of Canada rather than the right-wing Canadian Alliance at the federal level, even though many of his colleagues backed the Alliance. In 2001, Loewen was the only member of the provincial PC caucus to attend a Winnipeg fundraiser for federal PC leader Joe Clark. In the same year, he criticized the provincial New Democratic government of Gary Doer for not going far enough in extending rights to same-sex couples.

Loewen became involved a serious controversy in early 2002, after issuing a media notice that was strongly critical of Manitoba's Crocus investment portfolio. He wrote that the company held investments "in a number of Manitoba companies" that were "in financial difficulty", and requested that the government ask the Auditor General to review the valuation of the fund. His statement was met with strong opposition from Crocus, which threatened legal action. Loewen was subsequently demoted from his position as Finance Critic by Stuart Murray, and was required to make a formal apology to the legislature in April 2002. Almost three years later, Crocus stopped trading and was forced into receivership. Many believe Loewen's concerns were vindicated by the trust's eventual failure. Loewen criticized several parties, including the government, opposition and senior Crocus management, when discussing the firm's failure in a 2007 interview.

He was re-elected in the 2003 election by a slightly reduced margin. In late 2003, he introduced a bill to phase out Video Lottery Terminals from the province.

== Federal politics ==
The Progressive Conservative Party of Canada merged with the Canadian Alliance in early 2004 to create the Conservative Party of Canada. Loewen initially supported the new party, but announced on September 23, 2005, that he would seek the federal Liberal nomination for Charleswood—St. James—Assiniboia in the upcoming federal election. In making the announcement, Loewen said he was uncomfortable with the social conservatism of Conservative leader Stephen Harper, and that he "never believed in the policies of the former Alliance and Reform parties" which he described as "dominat[ing] the [Conservative] party". He resigned from the provincial legislature on September 26, 2005, and subsequently beat Gennarino Conte for the Liberal nomination. He lost to Conservative incumbent Steven Fletcher in the 2006 federal election, as the Conservatives gained twenty-five seats to form a minority government. Loewen acknowledged that the national trend worked against his candidacy.

After the election, Loewen returned to the board of TelPay, formerly a division of Comcheq. He is also a partner in Payworks, an internet based payroll service. As a volunteer, he is leading the fund raising efforts for construction of the North End Wellness Centre in Winnipeg.

In 2007, Loewen was acclaimed as the Liberal candidate for Winnipeg South. He lost to Conservative incumbent Rod Bruinooge in the 2008 federal election.

== Electoral record ==
2008 Canadian federal election: Winnipeg South
Party	Candidate	Votes	%	±%	Expenditures
Conservative	Rod Bruinooge	19,954	48.83	+7.42	$74,312
Liberal	John Loewen	14,221	34.80	-6.35	$73,677
New Democratic	Sean Robert	4,673	11.43	-2.29	$9,507
Green	David Cosby	1,839	4.50	+1.42	$3,312
Christian Heritage	Heidi Loewen-Steffano	173	0.42	-0.19	$804
Total valid votes/expense limit		40,860	100.00		$78,463
Total rejected ballots		179	0.44	+0.1	
Turnout		41,039	65.63	-3.78	
Conservative hold		Swing		+6.9	

2006 Canadian federal election: Charleswood—St. James—Assiniboia
Party	Candidate	Votes	%	Expenditures
Conservative	Steven Fletcher	20,791	46.98	$71,903.92
Liberal	John Loewen	16,099	36.37	$68,104.46
New Democratic	Dennis Kshyk	5,669	12.81	$1,977.65
Green	Mike Johannson	1,700	3.84	$397.50
Total valid votes		44,259	100.00	
Total rejected ballots		157		
Turnout		44,416	69.93	
Electors on the lists		63,517		
Sources: Official Results, Elections Canada and Financial Returns, Elections Canada.

2003 Manitoba general election: Fort Whyte
Party	Candidate	Votes	%	±%	Expenditures
Progressive Conservative	John Loewen	4,960	52.71	−9.02	$13,693.53
New Democratic	Janine Ballingall Scotten	2,647	28.13	+1.31	$18,368.88
Liberal	Gerry Sankar	1,803	19.16	+7.71	$14,257.51
Total valid votes		9,410	99.75		
Rejected and declined votes		24	0.25	-0.37	
Turnout		9,434	56.61	−19.81	
Electors on the lists		16,664			
Progressive Conservative hold		Swing		-5.17	

1999 Manitoba general election: Fort Whyte
Party	Candidate	Votes	%	Expenditures
Progressive Conservative	John Loewen	6,480	61.73	$25,444.88
New Democratic	Bidhu Jha	2,815	26.82	$24,511.00
Liberal	Malli Aulakh	1,202	11.45	$18,808.08
Total valid votes		10,497	99.38	
Rejected and declined votes		66	0.62	
Turnout		10,563	76.43	
Registered voters		13,821		

All electoral information is taken from Elections Canada and Elections Manitoba. Provincial expenditures refer to candidate expenses. Italicized expenditures refer to submitted totals, and are presented when the final reviewed totals are not available.

== Footnotes ==
Some biographical information is taken from Loewen's website.

Preceded by division created in 1999	Member of the Manitoba Legislature for Fort Whyte; 1999—2005	Succeeded by Hugh McFadyen
