= Canadian House of Commons Standing Committee on Procedure and House Affairs =

Standing committee of the House of Commons of Canada

The Canadian House of Commons Standing Committee on Procedure and House Affairs (PROC) is a standing committee composed of the three official political parties of the Government of Canada that is responsible for the procedural and administrative matters relating to the House of Commons of Canada. It has 10 members. This committee is the striking committee, which chooses the members of the other House committees.

== Mandate ==
The 10-member Standing Committee on Procedure and House Affairs Committee is responsible for a number of procedural, and administrative matters relating to the House of Commons. This includes matters such as Private Members' Business, questions of parliamentary privilege and review of the Standing Orders.

== Membership ==
As of the 45th Canadian Parliament:

Party	Member	District
Liberal	Chris Bittle, Chair	St. Catharines, ON
Liberal	Élisabeth Brière	Sherbrooke, QC
Liberal	Greg Fergus	Hull—Aylmer, QC
Liberal	Arielle Kayabaga	London West, ON
Liberal	Tim Louis	Kitchener—Conestoga, ON
Conservative	Blaine Calkins	Ponoka—Didsbury, AB
Conservative	Micahel Cooper, Vice-Chair	St. Albert—Sturgeon River, AB
Conservative	Grant Jackson	Brandon—Souris, MB
Conservative	Tako van Popta	Langley Township—Fraser Heights, BC
BQ	Christine Normandin, Vice-Chair	Saint-Jean, QC
