= GoMusicNow =

Defunct Russian music download site

- Website type: Digital music download service
- Website: gomusicnow.com
- Commercial: Yes
- Registration: Required
- Launched: 2007; 19 years ago
- Current status: Defunct

GoMusicNow was a Russian music download site. The site offered a variety of music, special collections, as well as audiobooks in English. Songs were priced per song, with prices from 9 to 19 cents; audiobooks range from around $1.60 through $5.00 USD. The site's design and display were highly similar to MP3Search.ru along with current database collection numbers; in fact, users with a GoMusic account who tried to sign into the Mp3Search.ru login page were told that their account was a part of the GoMusic network.

== Features ==
The site provided songs in MP3 format. The songs lacked any digital rights management and thus were compatible with any MP3 player including the iPod, Zune, and Creative Zen. A majority of the songs were in the VBR format. The bit rate, along with album year and sometimes the genre, was stated in the header information for all albums.

GoMusicNow users could purchase and download an entire album or list of songs in one click for 10% off. According to the Terms of Use, a purchased song may be downloaded only once. Nonetheless, the Archive feature allowed for a second download of a song. If the second download was not sufficient, a song could be repurchased.

Members needed sufficient funds paid into their GoMusic account in order to purchase music. Members could acquire funds by paying into their account with Visa, MasterCard, and American Express credit cards or TelPay. GoMusicNow only allowed a payment of less than 30 USD on the first payment into the member's account. Afterwards, it was mandatory for at least $20 USD payments or higher. This led some users to complain that they would not be able to purchase single or a few albums without carrying an extraneous debit on their credit card, which may compound depending on interest rates or value of currency.

== History ==
At the end of 2008, GoMusic's website changed both aesthetically and functionally. New scripts were added to simplify the download process, especially when buying full albums. For a few months prior to this, all options to pay with a debit or credit card dropped off the site, allowing users to pay only by the telepay method. When credit card funding came back after the site re-design, the minimum amount to replenish the account went from $20.00 USD to $30.00 USD, and 3 more pricing tiers above $30.00 were added as well.

In June 2009, adding funds to your account no longer re-directed to a website outside of the site. The option to add funds and enter your credit card information was an input page on the main site. That August, Recording Industry of South Africa (RISA) requested that the Internet Service Providers Association (ISPA) block access to GoMusicNow because of how cheap the downloads were but ISPA refused.

Information other than the music catalog was available to site visitors is quite sparse, with only the Terms of Service, the Copyright information, and a form for support requests.

The site has claimed in the past that it is legal in Russia, in accordance with the Noncommercial Partnership "Federation of Authors and Rightsholders for Collective Management of Copyright in Interactive Regime." However, similar to AllofMP3, the legality of the site is questionable. The argument over whether MP3 download sites in Russia are legal continues, with viewpoints from both sides.

As of 12 April 2013, users could still search for and download music but couldn't replenish account funds. When clicking on the "My Wallet" link you are taken to a blank page.

As of 11 October 2013, the service was no longer available. Many users have lost their funds.

As of June 2020, some users received notification that in order to complete a legal obligation, files purchased on GoMusic would be sent via filesharing.
