= Manitoba Entertainment Complex =

Business organization in Winnipeg, Canada

The Manitoba Entertainment Complex (MEC) was an organization of business interests in the city of Winnipeg, Manitoba, Canada. The group was created in August 1994, and sought to ensure the construction of a 16,000-seat multipurpose entertainment and sports complex in the city's downtown area to replace the aging Winnipeg Arena which lacked luxury amenities. The MEC's primary intent was to keep the Winnipeg Jets ice hockey team in the city. They were ultimately unsuccessful, and the franchise moved to Phoenix, Arizona in 1996.

The primary spokesperson for MEC was John Loewen. Other members included Leonard Asper and Stuart Murray.
