= Kelly McCauley =

Canadian politician (born 1964)

Kelly McCauley MP

Chair of the Canadian House of Commons Standing Committee on Government Operations and Estimates
- Incumbent
- Assumed office September 17, 2018
- Leader: Andrew Scheer; Erin O'Toole; Candice Bergen; Pierre Poilievre

Member of Parliament for Edmonton West
- Incumbent
- Assumed office October 19, 2015
- Preceded by: district created

Personal details
- Born: June 23, 1964 (age 61) Vancouver, British Columbia
- Party: Conservative
- Spouse: Sasha McCauley
- Children: Jensen McCauley, Parker McCauley
- Profession: Hospitality executive

Kelly J. McCauley MP (born June 23, 1964) is a Canadian politician who was elected to represent the riding of Edmonton West in the House of Commons of Canada in the 2015 federal election.

McCauley is a hospitality executive with over thirty years experience managing hotels and convention centres. He was born and raised in Vancouver and is a graduate of BCIT in the Hospitality Management program.

He has been chair of the Canadian House of Commons Standing Committee on Government Operations and Estimates since 2018.

== Electoral record ==
2021 Canadian federal election: Edmonton West
Party	Candidate	Votes	%	±%	Expenditures
Conservative	Kelly McCauley	25,278	45.15	–15.77	$61,664.84
New Democratic	Sandra Hunter	14,190	25.34	+10.78	$4,137.83
Liberal	Adam Wilson Brown	13,016	23.25	+3.10	$32,707.12
People's	Brent Kinzel	3,354	5.99	+4.07	$7,424.40
Marxist–Leninist	Peggy Morton	151	0.27	–	none listed
Total valid votes/expense limit		55,989	99.46	–	$118,977.75
Total rejected ballots		302	0.54	+0.02	
Turnout		56,291	61.60	–4.44	
Eligible voters		91,388			
Conservative hold		Swing		–13.28	
Source: Elections Canada

2019 Canadian federal election: Edmonton West
Party	Candidate	Votes	%	±%	Expenditures
Conservative	Kelly McCauley	35,719	60.92	+11.59	$53,447.12
Liberal	Kerrie Johnston	11,812	20.15	–14.74	$13,516.82
New Democratic	Patrick Steuber	8,537	14.56	+1.55	$2,593.87
Green	Jackie Pearce	1,441	2.46	+0.52	none listed
People's	Matthew Armstrong	1,126	1.92	–	$1,582.21
Total valid votes/expense limit		58,635	99.48	–	$114,118.54
Total rejected ballots		304	0.52	+0.09	
Turnout		58,939	66.04	–0.13	
Eligible voters		89,249			
Conservative hold		Swing		+13.17	
Source: Elections Canada

2015 Canadian federal election: Edmonton West
Party	Candidate	Votes	%	±%	Expenditures
Conservative	Kelly McCauley	26,370	49.33	–14.87	$107,945.94
Liberal	Karen Leibovici	18,649	34.89	+22.43	$96,857.17
New Democratic	Heather MacKenzie	6,955	13.01	–6.46	$42,880.40
Green	Pamela Leslie Bryan	1,037	1.94	–1.74	none listed
Libertarian	Alexander Dussault	341	0.64	–	$361.62
Marxist–Leninist	Peggy Morton	105	0.20	–	none listed
Total valid votes/expense limit		53,457	99.57	–	$213,830.45
Total rejected ballots		233	0.43	–	
Turnout		53,690	66.17	–	
Eligible voters		81,144			
Conservative hold		Swing		–18.65	
Source: Elections Canada
