= St. Albert—Edmonton =

Former federal electoral district in Alberta, Canada

Alberta electoral district
- Location of St. Albert—Edmonton within Edmonton

Federal electoral district
- Legislature: House of Commons
- District created: 2013
- District abolished: 2023
- First contested: 2015
- Last contested: 2021
- District webpage: profile, map

Demographics
- Population (2011): 105,162
- Electors (2019): 92,579
- Area (km²): 104
- Census division: Division No. 11
- Census subdivision(s): Edmonton, St. Albert

St. Albert—Edmonton is a former federal electoral district in Alberta, Canada, that was represented in the House of Commons of Canada from 2015 to 2025.

St. Albert—Edmonton was created by the 2012 federal electoral boundaries redistribution and was legally defined in the 2013 representation order. It came into effect upon the call of the 42nd Canadian federal election, scheduled for October 2015. It was created out of the district of Edmonton—St. Albert. The district was abolished in the 2022 Canadian federal electoral redistribution before the 2025 general election, and was dissolved into Edmonton Northwest and St. Albert—Sturgeon River.

== History ==
=== Historical boundaries ===
2003 representation order (as Edmonton—St. Albert)

2013 representation order

=== Members of Parliament ===
This riding has elected the following members of the House of Commons of Canada:

St. Albert—Edmonton
Parliament	Years	Member	Party
Riding created from Edmonton—St. Albert
43rd	2015–2021	Michael Cooper	Conservative
43rd	2015–2021	Michael Cooper	Conservative
44th	2021–2025	Michael Cooper	Conservative
Riding dissolved into Edmonton Northwest and St. Albert—Sturgeon River

== Demographics ==
Panethnic groups in St. Albert—Edmonton (2011−2021)
Panethnic group	2021		2016		2011	
Panethnic group	Pop.	%	Pop.	%	Pop.	%
European (Note: Statistic includes all persons that did not make up part of a visible minority or an indigenous identity.)	84,565	65.9%	85,760	71.95%	81,015	77.82%
Southeast Asian (Note: Statistic includes total responses of "Filipino" and "Southeast Asian" under visible minority section on census.)	9,265	7.22%	6,955	5.83%	4,735	4.55%
African	7,470	5.82%	4,870	4.09%	2,335	2.24%
Middle Eastern (Note: Statistic includes total responses of "West Asian" and "Arab" under visible minority section on census.)	7,370	5.74%	5,600	4.7%	3,750	3.6%
Indigenous	6,885	5.37%	5,215	4.38%	3,970	3.81%
East Asian (Note: Statistic includes total responses of "Chinese", "Korean", and "Japanese" under visible minority section on census.)	4,920	3.83%	4,425	3.71%	4,210	4.04%
South Asian	4,400	3.43%	3,705	3.11%	2,420	2.32%
Latin American	1,390	1.08%	1,185	0.99%	705	0.68%
Other/multiracial (Note: Statistic includes total responses of "Visible minority, n.i.e." and "Multiple visible minorities" under visible minority section on census.)	2,040	1.59%	1,485	1.25%	955	0.92%
Total responses	128,315	98.08%	119,195	98.25%	104,100	98.94%
Total population	130,822	100%	121,313	100%	105,216	100%
Notes: Totals greater than 100% due to multiple origin responses. Demographics based on 2012 Canadian federal electoral redistribution riding boundaries.

== Election results ==
Graph of election results in St. Albert—Edmonton (minor parties that never got 2% of the vote or didn't run consistently are omitted)

2021 Canadian federal election
Party	Candidate	Votes	%	±%	Expenditures
Conservative	Michael Cooper	29,652	47.57	–13.13	$38,825.53
New Democratic	Kathleen Mpulubusi	17,816	28.58	+13.38	$5,805.37
Liberal	Greg Springate	11,188	17.95	–1.22	$10,378.80
People's	Brigitte Cecelia	3,684	5.91	+3.96	$5,267.61
Total valid votes/expense limit		62,340	99.46	–	$122,114.60
Total rejected ballots		338	0.54	+0.03	
Turnout		62,678	66.05	–3.95	
Eligible voters		94,889			
Conservative hold		Swing		–13.25	
Source: Elections Canada

2019 Canadian federal election
Party	Candidate	Votes	%	±%	Expenditures
Conservative	Michael Cooper	39,506	60.69	+15.46	$33,538.36
Liberal	Greg Springate	12,477	19.17	–3.37	$10,807.28
New Democratic	Kathleen Mpulubusi	9,895	15.20	+4.04	$832.26
Green	Rob Dunbar	1,594	2.45	+1.06	$7,613.82
People's	Brigitte Cecelia	1,268	1.95	–	$5,492.03
Veterans Coalition	Robert Bruce Fraser	351	0.54	–	none listed
Total valid votes/expense limit		65,091	99.49	–	$117,365.03
Total rejected ballots		336	0.51	+0.27	
Turnout		65,427	70.00	+0.32	
Eligible voters		93,468			
Conservative hold		Swing		+9.41	
Source: Elections Canada

2015 Canadian federal election
Party	Candidate	Votes	%	±%	Expenditures
Conservative	Michael Cooper	26,783	45.24	–19.24	$57,186.82
Liberal	Beatrice Ghettuba	13,343	22.54	+11.70	$12,254.31
Independent	Brent Rathgeber	11,652	19.68	–	$51,242.87
New Democratic	Darlene Malayko	6,609	11.16	–8.92	$14,243.93
Green	Andrea Oldham	821	1.39	–3.22	none listed
Total valid votes/expense limit		59,208	99.75	–	$220,664.92
Total rejected ballots		146	0.25	–	
Turnout		59,354	69.67	–	
Eligible voters		85,187			
Conservative hold		Swing		–15.47	
Source: Elections Canada

2011 federal election redistributed results
Party	Vote	%
Conservative	27,626	64.48
New Democratic	8,601	20.08
Liberal	4,642	10.84
Green	1,974	4.61

== See also ==
- List of Canadian electoral districts
- Historical federal electoral districts of Canada
