= Marcel Lambert =

Canadian politician (1919–2000)

The Honourable Marcel Lambert PC QC
- Official 1980 profile

25th Speaker of the House of Commons
- In office September 27, 1962 – May 15, 1963
- Preceded by: Roland Michener
- Succeeded by: Alan Macnaughton

Member of the Canadian Parliament for Edmonton West
- In office 1957–1984
- Preceded by: James Angus MacKinnon
- Succeeded by: Murray Dorin

Personal details
- Born: Marcel Joseph Aimé Lambert; August 21, 1919 St. Albert, Alberta, Canada
- Died: September 24, 2000 (aged 81) Barrhead, Alberta, Canada
- Party: Progressive Conservative
- Education: University of Alberta (BA, BComm); Hertford College, Oxford (BCL, MA)

Military service
- Allegiance: Canada
- Branch/service: Canadian Army
- Rank: Lieutenant-colonel
- Unit: 14th Armoured Regiment (Calgary Regiment)
- Battles/wars: Second World War: Dieppe Raid

Marcel Joseph Aimé Lambert PC QC (August 21, 1919 – September 24, 2000) was a Canadian politician and Speaker of the House of Commons of Canada from 1962 to 1963.

== Life and career ==
Lambert was born in St. Albert, to a French Canadian father and a Belgian mother. He served in the 14th Armoured Regiment (Calgary Regiment) during the Second World War and participated in (and survived) the Dieppe Raid. He achieved the rank of lieutenant colonel.

After returning to Alberta, he was named a Rhodes Scholar in 1946 and in 1947 he entered Hertford College, Oxford (University of Oxford) to study law.

Lambert was a candidate for the Alberta Progressive Conservatives in the 1952 provincial election, but failed to win a seat in the provincial legislature.

He was first elected to the House of Commons of Canada as Progressive Conservative Member of Parliament (MP) from the riding of Edmonton West in the 1957 election. He was returned in the nine following elections, and remained an MP until his retirement prior to the 1984 election.

Lambert served as Parliamentary Secretary to the Minister of National Defence from 1957 to 1958, and as Parliamentary Secretary to the Minister of National Revenue until 1962.

Following the defeat of Speaker Roland Michener in the 1962 election, Lambert was nominated to the position of speaker of the House of Commons by Prime Minister John Diefenbaker.

Lambert presided over the House of Commons during a tenuous minority government situation. As speaker, Lambert strove to be very correct in his interpretation of standing orders, ruling opposition questions out of order during Question Period if they were not strict inquiries and strayed at all into argumentation. This displeased the Opposition and led to his rulings being appealed unsuccessfully.

Lambert refused to allow an emergency debate on the issue of Bomarc missiles that the opposition demanded when an American State Department press release was issued contradicting arguments made by the Diefenbaker government against accepting the missiles. Lambert asserted that the matter was not of sufficient urgency to warrant a special debate. Liberal leader Lester Pearson challenged Lambert's decision, and the House overturned Lambert's decision by a vote of 122 to 104.

This incident indicated that the government had lost control of the House. Soon after, the government was defeated on a motion of no confidence on the Bomarc issue. Diefenbaker called an election, and appointed Lambert to Cabinet as minister of Veterans Affairs. While Lambert was re-elected in Edmonton, the Progressive Conservative government lost the election, and Lambert's two-month career as a cabinet minister came to an end.

With the Conservatives in Opposition, Lambert sided with Diefenbaker's critics, and refused to sign a petition declaring loyalty to the Conservative leader in 1966 when Dalton Camp attempted to force a leadership review.

In Opposition, Lambert was a leading critic in the areas of National Defence and Finance. During the short-lived government of Joe Clark, he was chairman of the Miscellaneous Estimates Committee, and led it through a flurry of activity.

After being defeated in a bitter nomination race by his eventual successor, Murray Dorin, Lambert retired from the House of Commons at the 1984 election. He was appointed to the Canadian Transportation Commission by Prime Minister Brian Mulroney following the election.

== Archives ==
There is a Marcel Lambert fonds at Library and Archives Canada.
