= Murray Dorin =

Canadian politician (1954–2020)

Member of Parliament for Edmonton West
- In office 1984–1988
- Preceded by: Marcel Lambert
- Succeeded by: riding redistributed

Member of Parliament for Edmonton Northwest
- In office 1988–1993
- Preceded by: new district
- Succeeded by: Anne McLellan

Personal details
- Born: 21 May 1954 Viking, Alberta, Canada
- Died: 11 April 2020 (aged 65) Edmonton, Alberta, Canada
- Party: Progressive Conservative
- Profession: accountant

Murray William Dorin (21 May 1954 – 11 April 2020) was a Canadian politician and businessman, who served as a Progressive Conservative party member of the House of Commons of Canada from 1984 to 1993. He was a chartered accountant and controller by career.

Born in Viking, Alberta, Dorin was first elected at the Alberta riding of Edmonton West in the 1984 federal election, after upsetting longtime incumbent MP Marcel Lambert in a bitter nomination fight. Following changes to electoral district boundaries, he won the Edmonton Northwest riding in the 1988 federal election, therefore serving in both the 33rd and 34th Canadian Parliaments. As well as serving as a member of numerous legislative committees, standing committees, and subcommittees during his tenure, Dorin was vice-chair of the Standing Committee on Finance for the 2nd Session of the 34th Parliament, chair of the Standing Committee on Finance for the 3rd Session of the 34th Parliament, and chair of the Subcommittee on Tax Matters of the Standing Committee on Finance for the 3rd Session of the 34th Parliament.

Dorin left federal politics after being defeated in the 1993 federal election by Anne McLellan of the Liberal Party. However, he spent election day in the hospital, after being diagnosed with nervous exhaustion due to the stress of the campaign. In the 1997 Canadian federal election, he was active as a mentor to the party's candidates in Alberta, alongside former caucus colleagues such as Don Mazankowski, Scott Thorkelson and Jim Hawkes, but did not stand for reelection. He died in Edmonton on 11 April 2020.
