= James Angus MacKinnon =

Canadian politician (1881–1958)

The Honourable James Angus MacKinnon PC

Member of Parliament for Edmonton West
- In office 1935–1949
- Preceded by: Charles Stewart
- Succeeded by: George Prudham

Canadian Senator from Alberta
- In office 1949–1958
- Appointed by: Louis St. Laurent

Personal details
- Born: October 4, 1881 Port Elgin, Ontario, Canada
- Died: April 18, 1958 (aged 76) Ottawa, Ontario, Canada
- Party: Liberal
- Cabinet: Minister Without Portfolio; Minister of Trade and Commerce; Minister of National Revenue (Acting); Minister of Fisheries; Minister of Mines and Resources

James Angus MacKinnon, PC (October 4, 1881 – April 18, 1958) was a Canadian politician who served as a Member of Parliament, Cabinet Minister and later Senator from Alberta.

== Early life ==
James Agnus MacKinnon was in Port Elgin, Ontario, on October 4, 1881, to James MacKinnon and Margaret Tolmie MacKinnon, both of Scottish descent.

After acquiring an education, he taught school in Ontario and Alberta, after his move there.

He worked as a reporter for the Edmonton Bulletin, owned by Liberal politician Frank Oliver. In 1911 he went into the insurance business and held directorships in several large corporations.

Edmonton's Mackinnon Ravine is named after him.

== Political life ==
MacKinnon was first elected to the House of Commons of Canada representing the riding of Edmonton West in the 1935 federal election. Amid the Social Credit wave that occurred that year, he was the sole Liberal elected in Alberta. He was re-elected in 1940 and 1945.

He was named to Mackenzie's cabinet in 1939, at first as Minister without Portfolio. As MP, he held many cabinet positions in the cabinets of William Lyon Mackenzie King and Louis Stephen St-Laurent including Minister of Trade and Commerce, Minister of National Revenue (Acting), Minister of Fisheries, and Minister of Mines and Resources. As Minister of Trade and Commerce during the Second World War, MacKinnon strove to orient Canadian trade policy towards Latin America when the war cut off many markets from Canadian exports.

He did not seek re-election to the House in the 1949 election. He was appointed to the Senate of Canada representing the senatorial division of Edmonton, Alberta. From 1949 to 1950, while a senator, he was a minister without portfolio in the cabinet of Louis St-Laurent.

While serving as senator, MacKinnon died in 1958.

== Personal life ==
MacKinnon married Irene Sharpe from Prince Edward Island on June 28, 1911, and had one adopted daughter, Keltie. She died on October 31, 1968, leaving her husband Denis Slattery, and five children, Sandy White (née Slattery), Gayle Slattery, John Slattery, Jim Slattery and Ann Varszegi (née Slattery).

MacKinnon was given an honorary Doctorate in Laws from the University of Alberta on October 23, 1948.

== Archives ==
There is a James Angus MacKinnon fonds at Library and Archives Canada.
