= National Party of Canada =

National Party of Canada Parti national du Canada
- Former federal party
- Leader: Paul Reid
- President: William Stephenson
- Founded: 1993
- Dissolved: 1997
- Ideology: Canadian nationalism Progressivism; Anti-privatization; Anti-Americanism; Left-wing nationalism
- Political position: Centre-left
- Colours: Teal

The National Party of Canada was a short-lived Canadian political party that contested the 1993 federal election. The party is not related to the earlier National Party that was founded in 1979.

== Formation ==
Founded and led by Edmonton, Alberta, publisher Mel Hurtig (best known as publisher of The Canadian Encyclopedia), the National Party was created in 1992 to oppose the Canada–U.S. Free Trade Agreement, an increase in continentalism, and the privatization policies of the Progressive Conservative government of Brian Mulroney. It ran on a platform of economic nationalism, lowering the value of the Canadian dollar relative to the American to encourage exports, and social responsibility.

The National Party promoted the idea that electoral campaigns should be funded by individual Canadians each contributing a small amount each year, thus taking away what the National Party considered was the undue influence of large, multinational corporations funding political campaigns.

== 1993 elections ==
While the election was successful for two other new parties, the Bloc Québécois and the Reform Party, the National Party failed to win a seat.

The party nominated 171 candidates who won a total of 189,778 votes (1.40% of the popular votes, or 2.34% of the votes in those 171 ridings). None were elected, although Hurtig won 12.8% of the votes in his riding, Edmonton Northwest.

Riding	Province	Candidate	% of vote
Edmonton Northwest	Alberta	Mel Hurtig	12.8%
Kootenay West—Revelstoke	British Columbia	Bev Collins	8.54%
Elk Island	Alberta	James Keith Steinhubl	8.19%
Vancouver Centre	British Columbia	Thorsten Ewald	7.99%
Skeena	British Columbia	Isaac Sobol	7.72%
Winnipeg South Centre	Manitoba	Bill Loewen	7.385%
North Island—Powell River	British Columbia	Mark A. Grenier	7.34%
Victoria	British Columbia	Cecilia Mavrow	7.00%
Vancouver Quadra	British Columbia	W.J. Willy Spat	6.39%
Comox—Alberni	British Columbia	Ernest Daley	6.05%

Thirteen other candidates exceeded 4%, and another 18 exceeded 3%.

During the election, the party unsuccessfully sued the Canadian Broadcasting Corporation to try to force it to allow Hurtig to participate in the leaders' debates.

== Internal dissent ==
After the 1993 election, Hurtig and the party's chief financial backer, Winnipeg entrepreneur Bill Loewen, disagreed about the direction the party was taking. Hurtig and Loewen developed rival factions within the party, and battled for control.

Meanwhile, plans for internal elections continued and were carried out at the June 1994 Convention. Loewen ran a slate of candidates that he supported in an effort to regain control of the party, including Kurt Loeb as party leader and Daniel Whetung as President. Loeb, National Party candidate in 1993 in the Toronto-area riding of York Centre, reportedly sought the leadership on an interim basis, to hold a new leadership convention within about 18 months. Whetung was a relative unknown at the time. Party members were reportedly dissatisfied with the incumbent President, Andy Boyle, who was defeated by Whetung. Hurtig defeated Loeb. Loewen called for the vote to be made unanimous to demonstrate party unity.

== Dissolution ==
Even with Hurtig's decisive win in the June 1994 convention, internal divisions continued. Shortly after the convention Whetung unilaterally attempted to change the official and legal records of the Party at Elections Canada, naming himself as Party Leader and replacing recognized National Council members with self-appointed supporters. His attempt to affect a change in the membership of the National Council was rejected by Elections Canada. Hurtig resigned the leadership hoping to avoid the scandal and cost of the litigation that followed.

Loewen, a Fellow of the Certified General Accountants Association, (Loewen, removed from Party's Board of Directors by the Ontario Court of Justice, in early 1994, was never a member of the Party's National Council) publicly claimed to have launched several legal challenges to recover a purported $610,000 in unaccounted Party funds and assist Whetung with wresting control of the Party from its duly elected National Council. Though Loewen's name is repeatedly found throughout the hundreds of court filings, none of the related legal proceedings included Loewen as a plaintiff (Court Records). Headed by Daniel Whetung, the seven legal actions variously included Jacques Rubacha, Shirley Demaine, Diane Ullrich, Wayne Hill, Steve Ranta, and Garry Hollingsworth. None of the seven legal actions were successful for the Plaintiffs. However the cost of defending the Party from the seven legal actions, which did not appear to originate with Loewen, bankrupted the party.

In the words of Justice Dorgan, of the British Columbia Supreme Court (Victoria Registry, File 94 4041), regarding the unaccounted funds, there was "no merit in Mr. Whetung's claims".

The claim of missing funds, highly publicized in the media, was the cornerstone of Loewen's complaints. Those claims were pursued by Whetung. Documents, purported to be the Party's financial statements, and provided to Daniel Whetung were filed as evidence of missing funds in the British Columbia Supreme Court. The evidence contained a large (6 digits) duplicate entry, that was not supported by any accompanying financial documentation, and misrepresented the Party's financial position. Whetung's legal Counsel resigned after the duplicate entry was revealed to the satisfaction of the court.

With new counsel the Whetung group called for, and offered to pay for, a forensic audit of party finances. However, the Party had already placed what financial records it had with a forensic auditor earlier that year. The auditors were unable to complete an audit, as there were too many missing records. Whetung, while stating in the Federal Court proceeding that he was unaware of any of the Party's financial records, admitted in the BC Supreme Court to having the financial records that were needed to complete the audit. The BC Supreme Court ordered him to deliver what records he controlled to the auditors, and to pay for the audit. According to the Party's auditors not enough of the missing records were delivered to provide an opinion. Payment for their work was never received from the Plaintiffs.

After much work by volunteers, financial records meeting the requirements set by Elections Canada were provided to the Chief Electoral Officer, prior to the de-registration of the Party.

The Whetung faction was represented by top law firms at both the provincial and federal levels. The National Council, short of funds, was represented by the Party's President and Chief Agent, William Stephenson. Treasurer, Michael Kim Stebner, and Leader, Paul Reid. All challenges to the National Council by Whetung's group failed from lack of merit. Costs awarded to the National Council have not been paid. The final court challenge at the Federal Court of Appeal failed on September 10, 1998 (Court file number A-1056-96). In an unprecedented move, the three member Federal Appeal Court delivered their decision from the bench in favour of the National Council, rejecting, outright, all claims by Whetung and the other plaintiffs.

Although party membership continued to grow after the 1993 election, the seven meritless court challenges having damaged the brand and the Party's finances, the National Party of Canada was prevented from promoting the Party's agenda or to contest any further elections. In June 1997, Canada's Chief Electoral Officer officially de-registered the party.

Some members of the Whetung group, as well as one of the group's legal counsel, ran as candidates for other parties during the litigation to wrest control of the Party from the Party's National Council and members.

== Election results ==
Election	Leader	Candidates	Votes	%
1993	Mel Hurtig	171 / 295	187,251	1.38%
