= Billy Morin =

Canadian Cree First Nations leader

Billy Morin ᓇᐦᑐᑭᑐᐱ MP
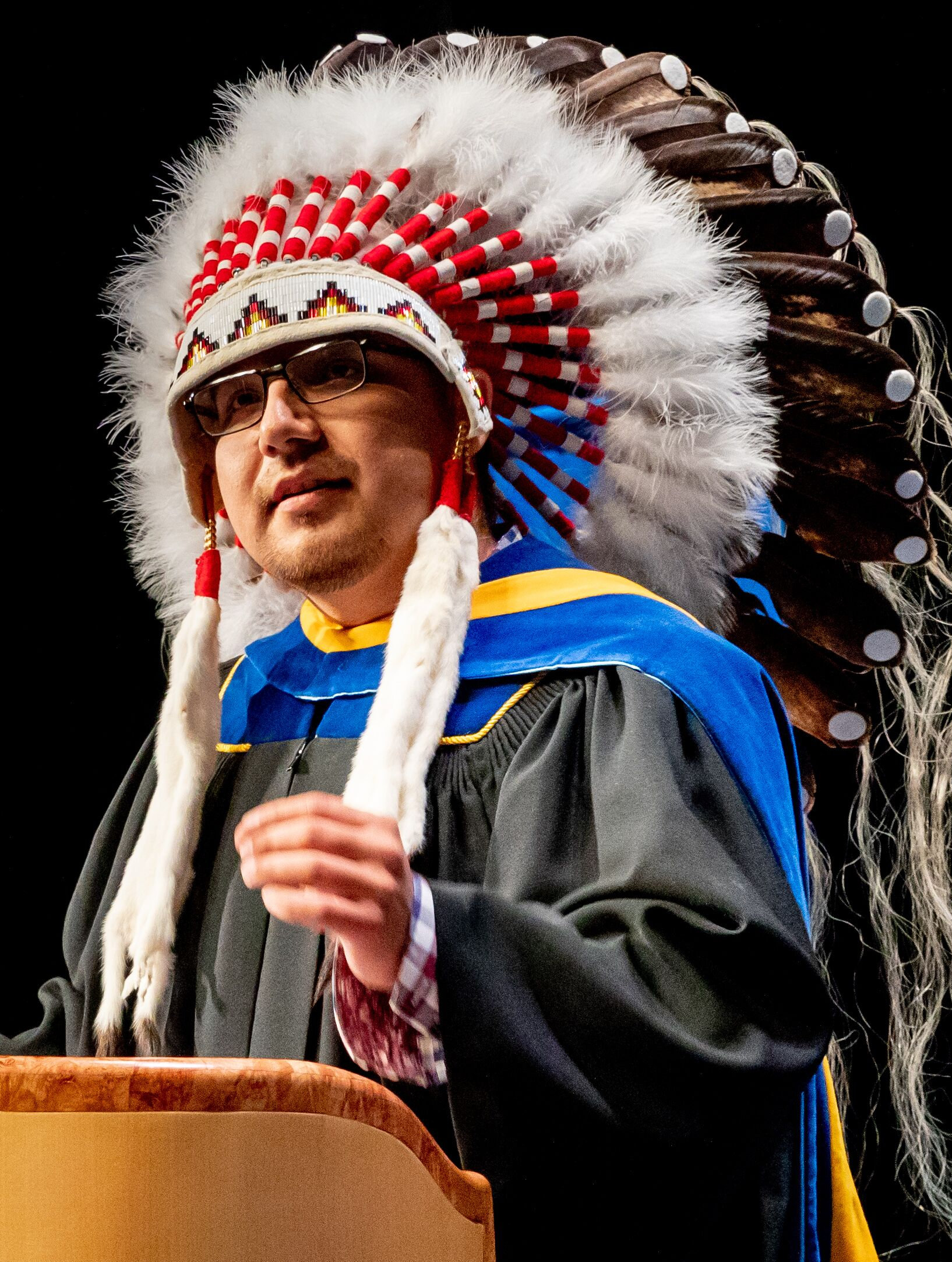
- Morin in 2019

Member of Parliament for Edmonton Northwest
- Incumbent
- Assumed office April 28, 2025
- Preceded by: Riding reestablished

Personal details
- Born: William Morin IV; 1987 or 1988 (age 36–38)
- Party: Conservative
- Education: Northern Alberta Institute of Technology

William Morin IV MP (Cree: ᓇᐦᑐᑭᑐᐱ Nahtokitopi: "Rides a Sacred Horse"; born 1987 or 1988) is a Canadian Cree First Nations leader and politician who was the Chief of Enoch Cree Nation from August 2015 to June 2022. He was elected to represent the riding of Edmonton Northwest in the 2025 federal election as a member of the Conservative Party of Canada. He has built partnerships among Indigenous and non-Indigenous groups toward economic and social prosperity and reconciliation.

== Ancestry and relationships ==
Morin is named after Chief William (Billy) Morin I, and is a fifth-generation descendant of Chief Alexis Morin. He shares two sons and a daughter with his wife Felecia.

== Education ==
Morin graduated from Edmonton’s St. Francis Xavier Catholic High School, and is a graduate of the Civil Engineering Technology and Bachelor of Technology Management programs at the Northern Alberta Institute of Technology (NAIT). He also holds an Honorary Bachelor of Business Administration degree from NAIT. Before serving Enoch as Councillor and later Chief, he held positions with the City of Edmonton and Government of Alberta.

== Tenure as Chief of Enoch Cree Nation ==
In 2015, Chief Morin was elected as the youngest Chief in the history of Enoch Cree Nation (Maskêkosihk) at the age of 28 with a focus on economic development and strengthening relationships. Morin had served for two years as a band councillor prior to his election as Chief, and as school board chair, housing board chair, economic development chair and also a member of the River Cree board.

Chief Morin’s accomplishments at Enoch Cree Nation include revitalizing Cree language and culture, promoting Indigenous tourism, advancing rural broadband connectivity, building a new primary school, initiating Edmonton’s first urban reserve, concluding the first major investment through the Alberta Indigenous Opportunities Corporation through the $1.5 billion Cascade natural gas power plant, planning an Indigenous birthing and surgical centre, repatriating children's services through the Maskêkosak Newowacistwan Nâtamâkêwin Society, and signing a memorandum of understanding with the City of Edmonton to strengthen collaboration.

== Tenure as Grand Chief of the Confederacy of Treaty Six First Nations ==
In 2020, Chief Morin was elected by 16 other Chiefs to a one-year term as the Grand Chief of the Confederacy of Treaty Six First Nations. Morin succeeded Dr. Wilton Littlechild from Maskwacis, a lawyer who served as MP for the Wetaskiwin area in the 80s and 90s, and former commissioner on the Truth and Reconciliation Commission of Canada.

During his term as Grand Chief, he led Treaty Six Chiefs’ response to the COVID-19 pandemic, advocated for affordable housing, Indigenous sovereign healthcare, sustainable resource development, and stronger relationships with the private sector to create more Indigenous jobs. Morin also began working with the Government of Alberta to eliminate the Alberta Indian Tax Exemption (AITE) card and its redundant administration, signed the Alberta Confederacy of Treaty Six First Nations Protocol Agreement with the Government of Alberta.

== Regional leadership ==
Morin has served on regional boards including Explore Edmonton, the First Nation Capital Investment Partnership, the Edmonton Region Hydrogen Hub, and Alberta Cancer Foundation.

== Electoral record ==
2025 Canadian federal election: Edmonton Northwest
Party	Candidate	Votes	%	±%	Expenditures
Conservative	Billy Morin	29,194	53.44	+10.34	$119,623.43
Liberal	Lindsey Machona	20,907	38.27	+15.40	$25,679.34
New Democratic	Omar Abubakar	3,597	6.58	–21.05	$8,542.19
People's	Albert Carson	593	1.09	–5.15	$2,644.45
Green	Colleen Rice	335	0.61	+0.58	none listed
Total valid votes/expense limit		54,626	99.35	–	$130,458.68
Total rejected ballots		357	0.65	+0.37	
Turnout		54,983	64.39	+7.14	
Eligible voters		85,387			
Conservative notional hold		Swing		–2.58	
Source: Elections Canada
