= Michael Cooper (politician) =

Canadian politician (born 1984)

Michael Cooper MP
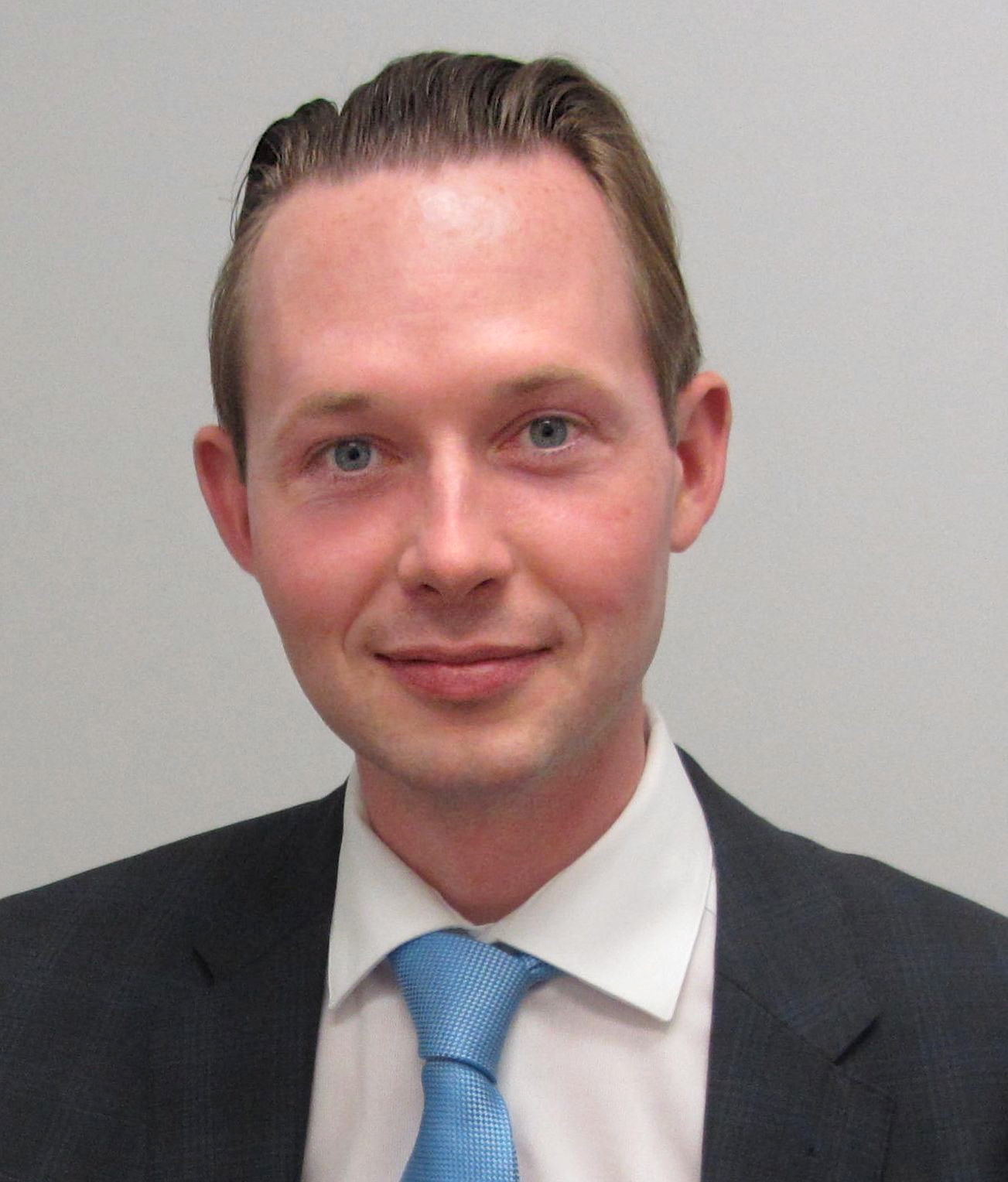
- Cooper in 2019

Member of Parliament for St. Albert—Sturgeon River St. Albert—Edmonton (2015–2025)
- Incumbent
- Assumed office October 19, 2015
- Preceded by: Brent Rathgeber

Personal details
- Born: March 8, 1984 (age 42) St. Albert, Alberta, Canada
- Party: Conservative
- Profession: Politician
- Website: MichaelCooperMP.ca

Michael Cooper is the Conservative Member of Parliament for St. Albert—Sturgeon River. First elected in 2015, Cooper was re-elected in 2019, 2021, and 2025.

Cooper serves as the Shadow Minister for Democratic Reform, as Vice-Chair of the Standing Committee on Procedure and House Affairs, and as a Member of the Standing Committee on Access to Information, Privacy, and Ethics.

Cooper is a lifelong resident of St. Albert and an active community volunteer. He is a Lector at St. Albert Catholic Parish and a member of the Knights of Columbus, St. Albert Rotary Club and the St. Albert and District Chamber of Commerce. A graduate of the University of Alberta, Cooper received a Bachelor of Arts and a Bachelor of Laws, both with distinction. He was called to the Alberta Bar in 2010. Prior to being elected Cooper worked as a civil litigator at an Edmonton law firm.

== Political career ==
On November 20, 2015, Cooper was appointed Official Opposition Deputy Justice Critic by Interim Conservative Leader Rona Ambrose. Cooper was re-appointed to this role by Conservative Leader Andrew Scheer as Deputy Shadow Minister. Following the 2019 federal election Cooper was appointed by Scheer as the Deputy Shadow Minister of Finance.

Cooper currently serves as vice-chair of the House of Commons Standing Committee on Procedure and House Affairs and is a member of the Standing Committee on Access to Information, Privacy and Ethics. Previously, he served as vice-chair of the Special Joint Committee on Medical Assistance in Dying (MAiD).

Cooper contributed to the 2017 book Turning Parliament Inside Out: Practical Ideas for Reforming Canada’s Democracy, which features a cross-section of Parliamentarians on ideas for Parliamentary reform. Cooper wrote a chapter on how to fix Question Period.

He was elected vice chair of the Canadian House of Commons Standing Committee on Procedure and House Affairs in the 45th Canadian Parliament in 2025.

=== Physician-assisted dying ===
Ambrose also appointed Cooper as vice-chair of the Special Joint Committee on Physician-Assisted Dying. He, along with the other Conservative MPs on the committee authored a dissenting report from the majority committee report cautioning against advance directives and opening physician-assisted dying to minors.

On April 14, 2016, then Justice Minister Jody Wilson-Raybould introduced Bill C-14, the government's Physician-Assisted Dying Legislation in the House of Commons. Bill C-14 was assented June 17, 2016 and incorporated several of the recommendations from the Conservative MPs' dissenting report, including limiting physician-assisted dying to competent adults suffering from a physical illness and prohibiting advance directives.

=== Wynn’s Law ===
Cooper sponsored in the House of Commons Bill S-217, known as Wynn's Law, introduced by Senator Bob Runciman on February 3, 2016. Bill S-217 sought to amend the Criminal Code to make it mandatory for the criminal history of bail applicants to be presented at bail hearings. The Bill was introduced after Constable David Wynn was shot and killed and Auxiliary Constable David Bond was shot by Shawn Rehn at a St. Albert casino in January 2015. Rehn was on bail at the time, despite a lengthy criminal history. A similar Bill was introduced by Cooper's predecessor, Brent Rathgeber, in June 2015.

Bill S-217 passed the Senate in October 2016. When the Bill was debated at second reading in the House of Commons, Marco Mendicino, the Parliamentary Secretary to the Minister of Justice announced the Liberal government's opposition to the Bill. Despite this, it passed second reading with the unanimous support of Conservative, NDP, Bloc Quebecois and Green MPs, plus 27 Liberal MPs. However, when Bill S-217 was studied at the Justice Committee, Liberal and NDP MPs on the Committee voted to recommend that the Bill not proceed. On June 14, 2017, the House of Commons voted not to proceed with Bill S-217 by a vote of 199 to 103.

=== Juror mental health bill ===
On October 29, 2018, Cooper introduced Private Members’ Bill C-417, which sought to amend the jury secrecy rule section of the Criminal Code. The Bill would amend the section so that former jurors suffering from mental health issues arising from their jury service can disclose all aspects of the jury deliberation process with a medical professional. The jury secrecy rule prohibits former jurors from disclosing aspects of the jury deliberation process with anyone for life. The Bill would implement a recommendation of a report of the Standing Committee on Justice and Human Rights entitled: Improving Support for Jurors in Canada.

Cooper's Bill was seconded by NDP MP Murray Rankin. The Bill passed the House of Commons unanimously on April 12, 2019, but died on the order paper when the 2019 federal election was called.

Cooper sponsored Bill S-207, introduced by Conservative Senator Pierre-Hughes Boisvenu in December 2019. The Bill is substantively similar to Cooper's Bill C-417 but died on the order paper at the dissolution of the 43rd Parliament. Following the 2021 election, Senator Boisvenu re-introduced the juror bill, as Bill S-206, with Cooper as the House of Commons sponsor. On December 8, 2021, Bill S-206 passed the Senate unanimously, and had passed through the House of Commons, receiving unanimous support during third reading on September 28, 2022. Bill S-206 received royal assent on October 18, 2022, finally becoming law.

=== 2017 Conservative Party of Canada leadership race ===
Cooper endorsed MP Erin O'Toole during the 2017 Conservative Party of Canada leadership race. O’Toole placed third behind MP Maxime Bernier and the winner MP Andrew Scheer.

=== 2019 statements to Justice Committee reciting Christchurch shooter's manifesto ===
During the 42nd Canadian Parliament, Cooper served as vice-chair of the Standing Committee on Justice and Human Rights. In May, 2019, Cooper quoted from the manifesto of the man accused of the mass killings in Christchurch, New Zealand in an attempt to check the testimony of a committee witness who tried to connect the killer's ideology to conservatism. According to a media report, Cooper called out Faisal Khan Suri, president of the Alberta Muslim Public Affairs Council, for his testimony trying to link conservative commentators to the anti-Muslim extremist's heinous acts. The MP charged that Mr. Faisal's accusations were "defamatory" and stated his political posturing diminished his credibility as a witness. Party leader Andrew Scheer removed Cooper from the justice committee as a consequence. Committee members later removed specific parts of the remarks from the official committee record.

As a result of his comments in the standing committee, Cooper also faced resurfacing allegations about remarks he reportedly made while in law school. These allegations related to a statement Cooper reportedly made about "goat herder cultures" when in a seminar about Canadian multiculturalism.

=== 2020 Conservative Party of Canada leadership race ===
Cooper endorsed Peter MacKay during the 2020 Conservative Party of Canada Leadership Race.

=== Bill C-6 - conversion therapy ===
On June 22, 2021, Cooper was one of 63 MPs to vote against Bill C-6. This bill was passed by majority vote and will make certain aspects of conversion therapy a crime, including "causing a child to undergo conversion therapy." Cooper said that while he supported the objective of the Bill, he could not vote for it because the definition was “vague and overly broad.” Cooper voted for the Bill at second reading stage. As a member of the Justice Committee that studied the Bill, Cooper supported amendments to the legislation that were defeated.

=== Canada-Taiwan Relations Framework Act ===
On June 17, 2021, Cooper introduced Private Members’ Bill C-315, An Act respecting a framework to strengthen Canada-Taiwan relations. The Bill proposed a mechanism, given the absence of formal diplomatic relations, by which to conduct relations between Canada and Taiwan, including in respect of economic, cultural, and legal affairs.

=== Convoy protest 2022 ===
On January 29, 2022, Cooper attended the Freedom Convoy 2022 protest in Ottawa and handed out coffee to participants alongside fellow Alberta Conservative MP Damien Kurek. Cooper was interviewed on-site by CBC News as a convoy protester in the background was seen holding a Canadian flag defaced with a swastika. The interview prompted a joint statement by Edmonton mayor Amarjeet Sohi and St.Albert mayor Cathy Heron declaring that they were troubled by the photograph and that Cooper did not represent the values of their constituents. Later that night, Cooper released a statement saying that he was unaware of the swastika-defaced flag, condemned Nazism as "the purest form of evil" and the decision to fly the flag as "reprehensible", but said it was not representative of the majority of Freedom Convoy protestors.

=== 2022 Conservative Party of Canada leadership race ===
Cooper endorsed Pierre Poilievre during the 2022 Conservative Party of Canada Leadership Race. Cooper served as Poilievre’s Co-Caucus Liaison, along with New Brunswick M.P. John Williamson, during the race.

== Electoral record ==
2025 Canadian federal election: St. Albert—Sturgeon River
Party	Candidate	Votes	%	±%	Expenditures
Conservative	Michael Cooper	49,216	63.95	+7.92	
Liberal	Lucia Stachurski	22,977	29.86	+18.48	
New Democratic	Dorothy Anderson	3,684	4.79	-18.76	
People's	Brigitte Cecelia	820	1.07	-6.73	
Christian Heritage	Jeff Willerton	264	0.34	+0.03	
Total valid votes/expense limit		76,961	99.56		
Total rejected ballots		344	0.44		
Turnout		77,305	76.80		
Eligible voters		100,651			
Source: Elections Canada

2021 Canadian federal election: St. Albert—Edmonton
Party	Candidate	Votes	%	±%	Expenditures
Conservative	Michael Cooper	29,652	47.6	-13.09	
New Democratic	Kathleen Mpulubusi	17,816	28.6	+13.4	
Liberal	Greg Springate	11,188	17.9	-1.27	
People's	Brigitte Cecelia	3,684	5.9	+3.95	
Total valid votes		62,340	99.46		
Total rejected ballots		338	0.54	+0.03	
Turnout		62,678	66.34	-3.66	
Eligible voters		94,477			
Conservative hold		Swing			
Source: Elections Canada

2019 Canadian federal election: St. Albert—Edmonton
Party	Candidate	Votes	%	±%	Expenditures
Conservative	Michael Cooper	39,506	60.69	+15.46	$33,538.36
Liberal	Greg Springate	12,477	19.17	–3.37	$10,807.28
New Democratic	Kathleen Mpulubusi	9,895	15.20	+4.04	$832.26
Green	Rob Dunbar	1,594	2.45	+1.06	$7,613.82
People's	Brigitte Cecelia	1,268	1.95	–	$5,492.03
Veterans Coalition	Robert Bruce Fraser	351	0.54	–	none listed
Total valid votes/expense limit		65,091	99.49	–	$117,365.03
Total rejected ballots		336	0.51	+0.27	
Turnout		65,427	70.00	+0.32	
Eligible voters		93,468			
Conservative hold		Swing		+9.41	
Source: Elections Canada

2015 Canadian federal election: St. Albert—Edmonton
Party	Candidate	Votes	%	±%	Expenditures
Conservative	Michael Cooper	26,783	45.24	–19.24	$57,186.82
Liberal	Beatrice Ghettuba	13,343	22.54	+11.70	$12,254.31
Independent	Brent Rathgeber	11,652	19.68	–	$51,242.87
New Democratic	Darlene Malayko	6,609	11.16	–8.92	$14,243.93
Green	Andrea Oldham	821	1.39	–3.22	none listed
Total valid votes/expense limit		59,208	99.75	–	$220,664.92
Total rejected ballots		146	0.25	–	
Turnout		59,354	69.67	–	
Eligible voters		85,187			
Conservative hold		Swing		–15.47	
Source: Elections Canada
