= St. Albert—Sturgeon River =

Federal electoral district in Alberta, Canada

Alberta electoral district
- Interactive map of riding boundaries from the 2025 federal election

Federal electoral district
- Legislature: House of Commons
- District created: 2023
- First contested: 2025

Demographics
- Population (2021): 121,306
- Electors (2025): 97,531
- Area (km²): 4,392
- Census division(s): Division No. 11, Division No. 13
- Census subdivision(s): St. Albert, Sturgeon, Lac Ste. Anne (part), Morinville, Gibbons, Redwater, Bon Accord, Legal, Alexander, Onoway

St. Albert—Sturgeon River is a federal electoral district in Alberta, Canada. It came into effect upon the call of the 2025 Canadian federal election.

== Geography ==
Under the 2022 Canadian federal electoral redistribution the riding will be created out of St. Albert—Edmonton, Sturgeon River—Parkland and Yellowhead.

- It will contain St. Albert, Sturgeon County and the municipalities it surrounds, and most of Lac Ste. Anne County and the municipalities it surrounds except for the Mayerthorpe area.

== Demographics ==
According to the 2021 Canadian census

Languages: 86.7% English, 9.5% French

Religions: 53.7% Christian (26.4% Catholic, 4.8% United Church, 3.0% Anglican, 2.2% Lutheran, 1.2% Christian Orthodox, 1.1% Baptist, 1.1% Pentecostal, 13.9% Other), 43.2% No religion

Median income: $51,200 (2020)

Average income: $65,600 (2020)

Panethnic groups in St. Albert—Sturgeon River (2021)
Panethnic group	2021	
Panethnic group	Pop.	%
European (Note: Statistic includes all persons that did not make up part of a visible minority or an indigenous identity.)	99,365	83.65%
Indigenous	10,245	8.62%
Southeast Asian (Note: Statistic includes total responses of "Filipino" and "Southeast Asian" under visible minority section on census.)	2,825	2.38%
South Asian	1,485	1.25%
East Asian (Note: Statistic includes total responses of "Chinese", "Korean", and "Japanese" under visible minority section on census.)	1,400	1.18%
African	1,325	1.12%
Middle Eastern (Note: Statistic includes total responses of "West Asian" and "Arab" under visible minority section on census.)	915	0.77%
Latin American	720	0.23%
Other/multiracial (Note: Statistic includes total responses of "Visible minority, n.i.e." and "Multiple visible minorities" under visible minority section on census.)	500	0.42%
Total responses	118,785	97.92%
Total population	121,310	100%
Notes: Totals greater than 100% due to multiple origin responses. Demographics based on 2022 Canadian federal electoral redistribution riding boundaries.

== History ==
Parliament	Years	Member	Party
St. Albert—Sturgeon River; Riding created from St. Albert—Edmonton, Sturgeon River—Parkland, and Yellowhead
45th	2025–present	Michael Cooper	Conservative

== Electoral results ==
2025 Canadian federal election
Party	Candidate	Votes	%	±%	Expenditures
Conservative	Michael Cooper	49,216	63.95	+7.92	$48,715.74
Liberal	Lucia Stachurski	22,977	29.86	+18.48	$43,984.89
New Democratic	Dorothy Anderson	3,684	4.79	–18.76	$1,322.80
People's	Brigitte Cecelia	820	1.07	–6.74	$4,690.06
Christian Heritage	Jeff Willerton	264	0.34	+0.03	$22,199.37
Total valid votes/expense limit		76,961	99.56	–	$143,850.12
Total rejected ballots		344	0.45	–	
Turnout		77,305	76.81	–	
Eligible voters		100,651			
Conservative notional hold		Swing		–5.28	
Source: Elections Canada

2021 federal election redistributed results
Party	Vote	%
Conservative	37,326	56.03
New Democratic	15,691	23.55
Liberal	7,582	11.38
People's	5,195	7.80
Maverick	608	0.91
Christian Heritage	206	0.31
Veterans Coalition	7	0.01
