= Telpay =

Electronic payment company in Canada

Telpay Incorporated

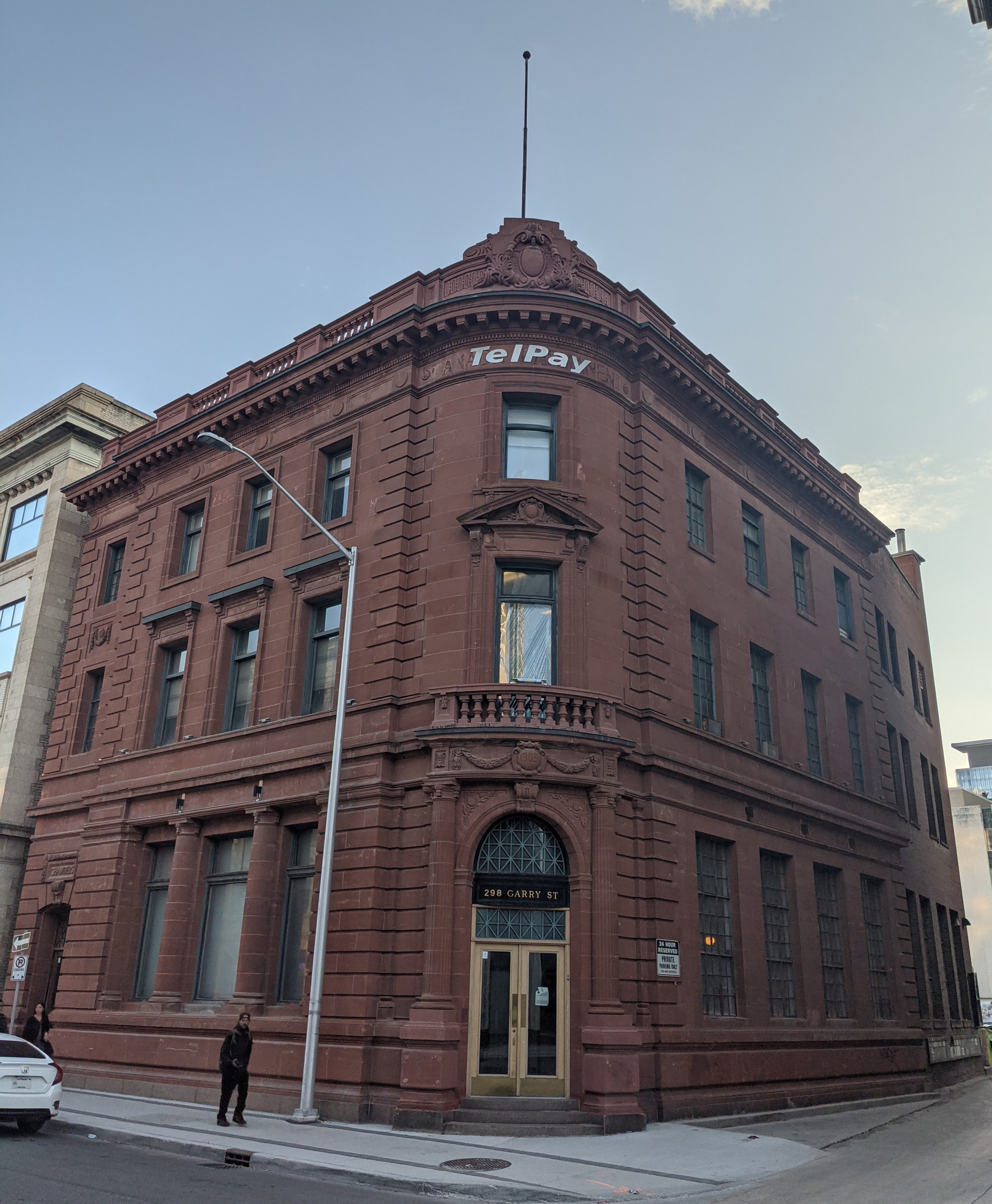
- Telpay headquarters
- Type: Private
- Industry: Banking, e-commerce
- Founded: 1985; 41 years ago
- Founder: Bill Loewen
- Headquarters: 890 Pembina Hwy, Winnipeg, Manitoba, Canada
- Key people: Mark Loewen, President, About the Team
- Products: Electronic payment software
- Services: Electronic payment processing
- Number of employees: 68
- Website: telpay.ca

Telpay Incorporated is the largest independent electronic payment company in Canada, processing over $19.5 billion in 2020.

The company's flagship product is Telpay for Business, an electronic payment software for businesses which eliminates the need for cheques.

== History ==
Telpay was founded in 1985 as a research-and-development division of Comcheq Services, a payroll company started by Bill Loewen in 1968. In March 1985, the first reports of telephone-generated bill payments were delivered to Manitoba Hydro and Manitoba Telephone System.

In 1992, Loewen sold Comcheq to CIBC, but retained control of the Telpay division, thereby establishing Telpay Incorporated, with Loewen as chair.

== Organization ==
Telpay headquarters is located in downtown Winnipeg, in a heritage building built in 1909 by the Canada Permanent Trust Company. The current President is Mark Loewen.

== See also ==
- Electronic bill payment
- Online banking
- Electronic business
- E-commerce
- Electronic funds transfer
- Comparison of shopping cart software
- Federal Financial Institutions Examination Council
