= Edmonton Northwest (federal electoral district) =

Federal electoral district in Alberta, Canada

Alberta electoral district
- Interactive map of riding boundaries from the 2025 federal election

Federal electoral district
- Legislature: House of Commons
- District created: 1987
- First contested: 1988
- Last contested: 1993

Demographics
- Population (2021): 112,964
- Census division: Division No. 11
- Census subdivision: Edmonton (part)

Edmonton Northwest (French: Edmonton-Nord-Ouest) is a federal electoral district in Alberta since 2025. A riding of the same name was previously represented in the House of Commons of Canada from 1988 to 1997.

== Geography ==
Edmonton Northwest was first created in 1987 from parts of Edmonton East, Edmonton North, Edmonton West and Pembina ridings, comprising the northwest part of the city of Edmonton. It was abolished in 1996 when it was redistributed into Edmonton West and Yellowhead ridings.

Edmonton Northwest was re-created by the 2022 Canadian federal electoral redistribution, combining the Edmonton portion from St. Albert—Edmonton with several northerly communities of Edmonton West.

== Demographics ==
According to the 2021 Canadian census

Languages: 66.7% English, 5.6% Tagalog, 4.7% Arabic, 2.5% Cantonese, 2.1% French, 1.4% Spanish, 1.4% Vietnamese, 1.4% Mandarin

Religions: 48.2% Christian (25.1% Catholic, 2.9% Christian Orthodox, 2.0% United Church, 1.7% Pentecostal, 1.6% Anglican, 1.2% Lutheran, 13.7% Other), 31.5% No religion, 13.7% Muslim, 2.5% Buddhist, 1.8% Hindu

Median income: $45,600 (2020)

Average income: $54,450 (2020)

Panethnic groups in Edmonton Northwest (2021)
| Panethnic group | 2021 | |
| Panethnic group | Pop. | % |
|---|---|---|
| European (Note: Statistic includes all persons that did not make up part of a visible minority or an indigenous identity.) | 52,875 | 47.67% |
| Southeast Asian (Note: Statistic includes total responses of "Filipino" and "Southeast Asian" under visible minority section on census.) | 15,215 | 13.72% |
| Middle Eastern (Note: Statistic includes total responses of "West Asian" and "Arab" under visible minority section on census.) | 9,720 | 8.76% |
| African | 9,570 | 8.63% |
| East Asian (Note: Statistic includes total responses of "Chinese", "Korean", and "Japanese" under visible minority section on census.) | 7,135 | 6.43% |
| Indigenous | 6,050 | 5.45% |
| South Asian | 5,920 | 5.34% |
| Latin American | 1,620 | 1.46% |
| Other/multiracial (Note: Statistic includes total responses of "Visible minority, n.i.e." and "Multiple visible minorities" under visible minority section on census.) | 2,805 | 2.53% |
| Total responses | 110,910 | 98.18% |
| Total population | 112,965 | 100% |
Notes: Totals greater than 100% due to multiple origin responses. Demographics based on 2022 Canadian federal electoral redistribution riding boundaries.

== History ==
| Parliament | Years | Member | Party |
|---|---|---|---|
Edmonton Northwest; Riding created from Edmonton East, Edmonton North, Edmonton West and Pembina
| 34th | 1988–1993 | Murray Dorin | Progressive Conservative |
| 35th | 1993–1997 | Anne McLellan | Liberal |
Riding dissolved into Edmonton West and Yellowhead
Riding re-created from Edmonton Griesbach, Edmonton West, and St. Albert—Edmonton
| 45th | 2025–present | Billy Morin | Conservative |

== Election results ==
=== 2023 representation order ===
2025 Canadian federal election
| Party | Candidate | Votes | % | ±% | Expenditures |
|---|---|---|---|---|---|
| Conservative | Billy Morin | 29,194 | 53.44 | +10.34 | $119,623.43 |
| Liberal | Lindsey Machona | 20,907 | 38.27 | +15.40 | $25,679.34 |
| New Democratic | Omar Abubakar | 3,597 | 6.58 | –21.05 | $8,542.19 |
| People's | Albert Carson | 593 | 1.09 | –5.15 | $2,644.45 |
| Green | Colleen Rice | 335 | 0.61 | +0.58 | none listed |
| Total valid votes/expense limit | | 54,626 | 99.35 | – | $130,458.68 |
| Total rejected ballots | | 357 | 0.65 | +0.37 | |
| Turnout | | 54,983 | 64.39 | +7.14 | |
| Eligible voters | | 85,387 | | | |
| Conservative notional hold | | Swing | | –2.58 | |
Source: Elections Canada

2021 federal election redistributed results
| Party | Vote | % |
|---|---|---|
| Conservative | 19,054 | 43.10 |
| New Democratic | 12,215 | 27.63 |
| Liberal | 10,112 | 22.87 |
| People's | 2,761 | 6.24 |
| Green | 13 | 0.03 |
| Others | 57 | 0.13 |

=== 1987 representation order ===
1993 Canadian federal election
| Party | Candidate | Votes | % | ±% |
|---|---|---|---|---|
| Liberal | Anne McLellan | 12,599 | 35.80 | +18.52 |
| Reform | Richard Kayler | 12,587 | 35.76 | +28.15 |
| National | Mel Hurtig | 4,507 | 12.81 | – |
| Progressive Conservative | Murray Dorin | 3,485 | 9.90 | –30.17 |
| New Democratic | Stephanie Michaels | 1,671 | 4.75 | –29.24 |
| Natural Law | Ric Johnsen | 186 | 0.53 | – |
| Green | Roger Swan | 119 | 0.34 | – |
| Independent | Heide Zeeper | 41 | 0.12 | – |
| Total valid votes | | 35,195 | 99.72 | |
| Total rejected ballots | | 100 | 0.28 | –0.08 |
| Turnout | | 35,295 | 57.25 | –12.98 |
| Eligible voters | | 61,650 | | |
| Liberal gain from Progressive Conservative | | Swing | | +24.50 |
Source: Elections Canada

1988 Canadian federal election
| Party | Candidate | Votes | % | ±% |
|---|---|---|---|---|
| Progressive Conservative | Murray Dorin | 15,556 | 40.07 | – |
| New Democratic | Marie Gordon | 13,198 | 33.99 | – |
| Liberal | Colin P. McDonald | 6,710 | 17.28 | – |
| Reform | Paul C. Sherstan | 2,956 | 7.61 | – |
| Independent | Fred Marshall | 200 | 0.52 | – |
| Confederation of Regions | Lucien Maynard | 111 | 0.29 | – |
| Commonwealth of Canada | Jerome Bohaychuk | 94 | 0.24 | – |
| Total valid votes | | 38,825 | 99.64 | |
| Total rejected ballots | | 142 | 0.36 | – |
| Turnout | | 38,967 | 70.23 | – |
| Eligible voters | | 55,485 | | |
| Progressive Conservative notional gain | | Swing | | N/A |
Source: Elections Canada

== See also ==
- List of Canadian electoral districts
- Historical federal electoral districts of Canada
