= Edmonton West =

Federal electoral district in Alberta, Canada

Alberta electoral district
- Interactive map of riding boundaries from the 2025 federal election

Federal electoral district
- Legislature: House of Commons
MP
Kelly McCauley
Conservative
- District created: 2013
- First contested: 2015
- Last contested: 2025
- District webpage: profile, map

Demographics
- Population (2011): 104,422
- Electors (2019): 88,508
- Area (km²): 105
- Pop. density (per km²): 994.5
- Census division: Division No. 11
- Census subdivision: Edmonton (part)

Edmonton West (French: Edmonton-Ouest) is a federal electoral district in Alberta, Canada, that was represented in the House of Commons of Canada from 1917 to 1988, from 1997 to 2004 and again since 2015.

== Demographics ==
Population, 2011	104,422
Electors	78,293
Area (km^{2})	105
Population density (people per km^{2})	994

Panethnic groups in Edmonton West (2011−2021)
Panethnic group	2021		2016		2011	
Panethnic group	Pop.	%	Pop.	%	Pop.	%
European (Note: Statistic includes all persons that did not make up part of a visible minority or an indigenous identity.)	70,850	53.58%	70,975	59.22%	69,285	67.37%
Southeast Asian (Note: Statistic includes total responses of "Filipino" and "Southeast Asian" under visible minority section on census.)	21,410	16.19%	15,490	12.93%	9,705	9.44%
East Asian (Note: Statistic includes total responses of "Chinese", "Korean", and "Japanese" under visible minority section on census.)	8,320	6.29%	7,955	6.64%	6,825	6.64%
Indigenous	7,885	5.96%	7,145	5.96%	5,080	4.94%
South Asian	7,390	5.59%	6,285	5.24%	3,820	3.71%
African	7,280	5.51%	4,995	4.17%	3,180	3.09%
Middle Eastern (Note: Statistic includes total responses of "West Asian" and "Arab" under visible minority section on census.)	4,370	3.31%	3,350	2.8%	2,475	2.41%
Latin American	1,975	1.49%	1,650	1.38%	1,175	1.14%
Other/Multiracial (Note: Statistic includes total responses of "Visible minority, n.i.e." and "Multiple visible minorities" under visible minority section on census.)	2,740	2.07%	2,010	1.68%	1,310	1.27%
Total responses	132,220	98.53%	119,845	98.34%	102,850	98.49%
Total population	134,194	100%	121,869	100%	104,422	100%
Notes: Totals greater than 100% due to multiple origin responses. Demographics based on 2012 Canadian federal electoral redistribution riding boundaries.

== History and geography ==
This riding was first created in 1914 from Edmonton riding. Originally, this was a vast rural district including most of the northwestern quadrant of the province of Alberta and a portion of the city of Edmonton: the area north of the North Saskatchewan River and west of 101st Street.

In 1924, it took in parts of the now-abolished Strathcona riding that had been within Edmonton city limits. It took in the southside area lying west of 103rd Street.

In 1924 the northern rural sections were also separated to form the ridings of Peace River and Athabasca.

In 1933 the more southerly portions became Jasper—Edson. The areas nearer the city but outside it became Pembina in 1966.

The urban part of riding similarly shrank over time as Edmonton's population expanded and new districts were spun off from Edmonton West. Parts of Edmonton West were lost to Edmonton—Strathcona (in 1952), Edmonton Centre (for the first time in 1966), and Edmonton North (in 1976). However, it also gained area from the (temporary) abolition of Edmonton Centre in 1976.

Edmonton West was abolished in 1987 when it was redistributed into Edmonton Northwest and Edmonton Southwest ridings. It was re-created in 1996 from the abolished Edmonton Northwest and redrawn Edmonton Southwest ridings.

Edmonton West was abolished again in 2003 and transferred mostly into the re-formed Edmonton Centre, with a smaller portion going into Edmonton—Spruce Grove. It was re-created by the 2012 Canadian federal electoral redistribution from parts of the abolished Edmonton—Spruce Grove and redrawn Edmonton Centre.

=== Historical boundaries ===
1914 representation order

1924 representation order

1933 representation order

1952 representation order

1966 representation order

1976 representation order

1996 representation order

2013 representation order

=== Members of Parliament ===
This riding has elected the following members of the House of Commons of Canada:

Parliament	Years	Member	Party
Edmonton West; Riding created from Edmonton
13th	1917–1921	William Antrobus Griesbach	Government (Unionist)
14th	1921–1925	Donald MacBeth Kennedy	Progressive
15th	1925–1926	Charles Stewart	Liberal
16th	1926–1930	Charles Stewart	Liberal
17th	1930–1935	Charles Stewart	Liberal
18th	1935–1940	James Angus MacKinnon	Liberal
19th	1940–1945	James Angus MacKinnon	Liberal
20th	1945–1949	James Angus MacKinnon	Liberal
21st	1949–1953	George Prudham	Liberal
22nd	1953–1957	George Prudham	Liberal
23rd	1957–1958	Marcel Lambert	Progressive Conservative
24th	1958–1962	Marcel Lambert	Progressive Conservative
25th	1962–1963	Marcel Lambert	Progressive Conservative
26th	1963–1965	Marcel Lambert	Progressive Conservative
27th	1965–1968	Marcel Lambert	Progressive Conservative
28th	1968–1972	Marcel Lambert	Progressive Conservative
29th	1972–1974	Marcel Lambert	Progressive Conservative
30th	1974–1979	Marcel Lambert	Progressive Conservative
31st	1979–1980	Marcel Lambert	Progressive Conservative
32nd	1980–1984	Marcel Lambert	Progressive Conservative
33rd	1984–1988	Murray Dorin	Progressive Conservative
Riding dissolved into Edmonton Northwest and Edmonton Southwest
Riding re-created from Edmonton Northwest and Edmonton Southwest
36th	1997–2000	Anne McLellan	Liberal
37th	2000–2004	Anne McLellan	Liberal
Riding dissolved into Edmonton Centre and Edmonton—Spruce Grove
Riding re-created from Edmonton—Spruce Grove and Edmonton Centre
42nd	2015–2019	Kelly McCauley	Conservative
43rd	2019–2021	Kelly McCauley	Conservative
44th	2021–2025	Kelly McCauley	Conservative
45th	2025–present	Kelly McCauley	Conservative

== Election results ==
=== 2015–present ===
Graph of election results in Edmonton West (since 2015, minor parties that never got 2% of the vote or didn't run consistently are omitted)

2025 Canadian federal election
Party	Candidate	Votes	%	±%	Expenditures
Conservative	Kelly McCauley	31,201	52.87	+7.25	$110,290.47
Liberal	Brad Fournier	23,995	40.66	+16.21	$31,954.04
New Democratic	Sean McQuillan	3,164	5.36	–19.16	$10,694.71
People's	Brent Kinzel	534	0.91	–4.20	$635.51
Marxist–Leninist	Peggy Morton	121	0.21	+0.00	none listed
Total valid votes/expense limit		59,015	99.39	–	$129,913.36
Total rejected ballots		361	0.61	+0.07	
Turnout		59,376	69.90	+8.30	
Eligible voters		84,946			
Conservative notional hold		Swing			
Source: Elections Canada

2021 federal election redistributed results
Party	Vote	%
Conservative	22,556	45.62
New Democratic	12,123	24.52
Liberal	12,088	24.45
People's	2,520	5.10
Green	25	0.05
Others	135	0.27

2021 Canadian federal election
Party	Candidate	Votes	%	±%	Expenditures
Conservative	Kelly McCauley	25,278	45.15	–15.77	$61,664.84
New Democratic	Sandra Hunter	14,190	25.34	+10.78	$4,137.83
Liberal	Adam Wilson Brown	13,016	23.25	+3.10	$32,707.12
People's	Brent Kinzel	3,354	5.99	+4.07	$7,424.40
Marxist–Leninist	Peggy Morton	151	0.27	–	none listed
Total valid votes/expense limit		55,989	99.46	–	$118,977.75
Total rejected ballots		302	0.54	+0.02	
Turnout		56,291	61.60	–4.44	
Eligible voters		91,388			
Conservative hold		Swing		–13.28	
Source: Elections Canada

2019 Canadian federal election
Party	Candidate	Votes	%	±%	Expenditures
Conservative	Kelly McCauley	35,719	60.92	+11.59	$53,447.12
Liberal	Kerrie Johnston	11,812	20.15	–14.74	$13,516.82
New Democratic	Patrick Steuber	8,537	14.56	+1.55	$2,593.87
Green	Jackie Pearce	1,441	2.46	+0.52	none listed
People's	Matthew Armstrong	1,126	1.92	–	$1,582.21
Total valid votes/expense limit		58,635	99.48	–	$114,118.54
Total rejected ballots		304	0.52	+0.09	
Turnout		58,939	66.04	–0.13	
Eligible voters		89,249			
Conservative hold		Swing		+13.17	
Source: Elections Canada

2015 Canadian federal election
Party	Candidate	Votes	%	±%	Expenditures
Conservative	Kelly McCauley	26,370	49.33	–14.87	$107,945.94
Liberal	Karen Leibovici	18,649	34.89	+22.43	$96,857.17
New Democratic	Heather MacKenzie	6,955	13.01	–6.46	$42,880.40
Green	Pamela Leslie Bryan	1,037	1.94	–1.74	none listed
Libertarian	Alexander Dussault	341	0.64	–	$361.62
Marxist–Leninist	Peggy Morton	105	0.20	–	none listed
Total valid votes/expense limit		53,457	99.57	–	$213,830.45
Total rejected ballots		233	0.43	–	
Turnout		53,690	66.17	–	
Eligible voters		81,144			
Conservative hold		Swing		–18.65	
Source: Elections Canada

2011 federal election redistributed results
Party	Vote	%
Conservative	24,733	64.20
New Democratic	7,502	19.47
Liberal	4,801	12.46
Green	1,417	3.68
Others	74	0.19

=== 1997–2004 ===
Graph of election results in Edmonton West (1996-2003, minor parties that never got 2% of the vote or didn't run consistently are omitted)

2000 Canadian federal election
Party	Candidate	Votes	%	±%	Expenditures
Liberal	Anne McLellan	21,978	44.24	+0.80	$65,989
Alliance	Betty Unger	21,245	42.77	+2.76	$66,378
Progressive Conservative	Rory J. Koopmans	3,009	6.06	–1.07	$5,622
New Democratic	Richard D. Vanderberg	2,895	5.83	–2.44	$10,850
Canadian Action	Dan Parker	354	0.71	–	$1,157
Marxist–Leninist	Peggy Morton	194	0.39	+0.09	none listed
Total valid votes		49,675	99.66		
Total rejected ballots		169	0.34	+0.02	
Turnout		49,844	56.29	+1.86	
Eligible voters		88,544			
Liberal hold		Swing		+1.78	
Source: Elections Canada

1997 Canadian federal election
Party	Candidate	Votes	%	±%	Expenditures
Liberal	Anne McLellan	17,802	43.45	–	$56,082
Reform	Dean Charles Kurpjuweit	16,392	40.01	–	$52,778
New Democratic	Duane Good Striker	3,386	8.26	–	$15,860
Progressive Conservative	Helen Stephenson	2,919	7.12	–	$10,441
Green	Roger Swan	210	0.51	–	$354
Natural Law	Sam Thomas	143	0.35	–	none listed
Marxist–Leninist	Peggy Morton	122	0.30	–	none listed
Total valid votes		40,974	99.68		
Total rejected ballots		130	0.32	–	
Turnout		41,104	54.43	–	
Eligible voters		75,514			
Liberal notional hold		Swing		N/A	
Source: Elections Canada

=== 1917–1988 ===
1984 Canadian federal election
Party	Candidate	Votes	%	±%
Progressive Conservative	Murray Dorin	25,764	58.82	+2.59
Liberal	Mike MacDonald	9,673	22.09	–7.94
New Democratic	Michael Moroz	7,339	16.76	+5.09
Confederation of Regions	Kenneth Richardson	697	1.59	–
Green	Chris Yanda	326	0.74	–
Total valid votes		43,799	99.72	
Total rejected ballots		124	0.28	+0.08
Turnout		43,923	65.76	+12.54
Eligible voters		66,796		
Progressive Conservative hold		Swing		+5.26
Source: Elections Canada

1980 Canadian federal election
Party	Candidate	Votes	%	±%
Progressive Conservative	Marcel Lambert	18,730	56.23	+0.57
Liberal	Hu Harries	9,999	30.02	–1.74
New Democratic	Jerome N. Slavik	3,886	11.67	–0.35
Independent	Jack Pickett	633	1.90	–
Marxist–Leninist	Carol Arnold	59	0.18	–0.09
Total valid votes		33,307	99.80	
Total rejected ballots		67	0.20	–0.09
Turnout		33,374	53.22	–11.58
Eligible voters		62,714		
Progressive Conservative hold		Swing		+1.15
Source: Elections Canada

1979 Canadian federal election
Party	Candidate	Votes	%	±%
Progressive Conservative	Marcel Lambert	21,423	55.67	+3.36
Liberal	Mike MacDonald	12,222	31.76	–5.04
New Democratic	Ken Nixon	4,624	12.02	+3.98
Independent	Eddie Keehn	114	0.30	–0.13
Marxist–Leninist	Mary Joyce	101	0.26	+0.04
Total valid votes		38,484	99.71	
Total rejected ballots		110	0.29	+0.11
Turnout		38,594	64.80	–1.90
Eligible voters		59,558		
Progressive Conservative hold		Swing		+4.20
Source: Elections Canada

1974 Canadian federal election
Party	Candidate	Votes	%	±%
Progressive Conservative	Marcel Lambert	29,990	52.31	+1.77
Liberal	Mike MacDonald	21,094	36.80	+1.20
New Democratic	Jane Weaver	4,605	8.03	–3.42
Social Credit	John B. Ludwig	1,270	2.22	–0.19
Independent	Brent Bissell	242	0.42	–
Marxist–Leninist	Stan Plante	128	0.22	–
Total valid votes		57,329	99.82	
Total rejected ballots		101	0.18	–0.36
Turnout		57,430	66.70	–10.50
Eligible voters		86,100		
Progressive Conservative hold		Swing		+1.48
Source: Library of Parliament

1972 Canadian federal election
Party	Candidate	Votes	%	±%
Progressive Conservative	Marcel Lambert	29,876	50.55	+1.16
Liberal	Mel Hurtig	21,040	35.60	–7.98
New Democratic	John Packer	6,770	11.45	+4.42
Social Credit	Donald H. McLeod	1,419	2.40	–
Total valid votes		59,105	99.46	
Total rejected ballots		318	0.54	+0.01
Turnout		59,423	77.20	+0.29
Eligible voters		76,973		
Progressive Conservative hold		Swing		+4.57
Source: Library of Parliament

1968 Canadian federal election
Party	Candidate	Votes	%	±%
Progressive Conservative	Marcel Lambert	19,612	49.39	+0.15
Liberal	Tevie Miller	17,306	43.58	+13.92
New Democratic	Kenneth Kerr	2,793	7.03	–0.04
Total valid votes		39,711	99.47	
Total rejected ballots		212	0.53	–0.13
Turnout		39,923	76.91	+3.75
Eligible voters		51,907		
Progressive Conservative hold		Swing		+7.04
Source: Library of Parliament

1965 Canadian federal election
Party	Candidate	Votes	%	±%
Progressive Conservative	Marcel Lambert	30,548	49.24	+6.95
Liberal	Herbert Meltzer	18,402	29.66	–3.31
Social Credit	Richard Jamieson	8,704	14.03	–4.21
New Democratic	William P.M. Glass	4,389	7.07	+0.57
Total valid votes		62,043	99.34	
Total rejected ballots		414	0.66	+0.11
Turnout		62,457	73.16	–6.06
Eligible voters		85,373		
Progressive Conservative hold		Swing		+5.13
Source: Library of Parliament

1963 Canadian federal election
Party	Candidate	Votes	%	±%
Progressive Conservative	Marcel Lambert	26,578	42.29	+6.25
Liberal	James Harper Prowse	20,720	32.97	+2.30
Social Credit	Orvis A. Kennedy	11,466	18.24	–5.16
New Democratic	John Motyl	4,091	6.51	–3.38
Total valid votes		62,855	99.45	
Total rejected ballots		349	0.55	–0.22
Turnout		63,204	79.22	+7.41
Eligible voters		79,781		
Progressive Conservative hold		Swing		+4.27
Source: Library of Parliament

1962 Canadian federal election
Party	Candidate	Votes	%	±%
Progressive Conservative	Marcel Lambert	19,681	36.04	–30.64
Liberal	James Harper Prowse	16,749	30.67	+12.25
Social Credit	Orvis A. Kennedy	12,780	23.40	+12.86
New Democratic	Pat J. Ryan	5,402	9.89	+5.53
Total valid votes		54,612	99.23	
Total rejected ballots		423	0.77	–0.01
Turnout		55,035	71.81	–3.88
Eligible voters		76,642		
Progressive Conservative hold		Swing		–21.45
Source: Library of Parliament

1958 Canadian federal election
Party	Candidate	Votes	%	±%
Progressive Conservative	Marcel Lambert	30,937	66.68	+31.98
Liberal	John L. Haar	8,544	18.42	–12.45
Social Credit	John William McKay	4,893	10.55	–18.38
Co-operative Commonwealth	David Hardman	2,023	4.36	–1.15
Total valid votes		46,397	99.22	
Total rejected ballots		366	0.78	+0.00
Turnout		46,763	75.69	+5.77
Eligible voters		61,781		
Progressive Conservative hold		Swing		+22.21
Source: Library of Parliament

1957 Canadian federal election
Party	Candidate	Votes	%	±%
Progressive Conservative	Marcel Lambert	14,173	34.70	+16.23
Liberal	Henry Dyde	12,606	30.87	–12.16
Social Credit	John William McKay	11,814	28.93	–0.68
Co-operative Commonwealth	Walter Mentz	2,249	5.51	–2.02
Total valid votes		40,842	99.22	
Total rejected ballots		323	0.78	–0.10
Turnout		41,165	69.92	+11.32
Eligible voters		58,878		
Progressive Conservative gain from Liberal		Swing		+14.20
Source: Library of Parliament

1953 Canadian federal election
Party	Candidate	Votes	%	±%
Liberal	George Prudham	11,301	43.02	–2.98
Social Credit	Cyril G. Havard	7,776	29.60	+9.66
Progressive Conservative	Harry Bryce Fowler	4,851	18.47	–8.25
Co-operative Commonwealth	Walter Mentz	1,977	7.53	+0.19
Labor–Progressive	Oliva V. Raappana	362	1.38	–
Total valid votes		26,267	99.12	
Total rejected ballots		234	0.88	+0.06
Turnout		26,501	58.60	–9.45
Eligible voters		45,223		
Liberal hold		Swing		–6.32
Source: Library of Parliament

1949 Canadian federal election
Party	Candidate	Votes	%	±%
Liberal	George Prudham	14,333	46.00	+12.77
Progressive Conservative	H. R. Milner	8,325	26.72	+3.42
Social Credit	James M. Stone	6,215	19.95	–5.53
Co-operative Commonwealth	Walter Mentz	2,285	7.33	–8.63
Total valid votes		31,158	99.18	
Total rejected ballots		258	0.82	–0.96
Turnout		31,416	68.05	–6.94
Eligible voters		46,165		
Liberal hold		Swing		+8.10
Source: Library of Parliament

1945 Canadian federal election
Party	Candidate	Votes	%	±%
Liberal	James Angus MacKinnon	8,562	33.23	–23.64
Social Credit	Ellwood Miles Mason	6,565	25.48	+8.46
Progressive Conservative	Arthur Lewis Burrows	6,002	23.30	+4.63
Co-operative Commonwealth	Mary R. Crawford	4,112	15.96	+8.52
Labor–Progressive	Mary Hunter	524	2.03	–
Total valid votes		25,765	98.22	
Total rejected ballots		468	1.78	+1.06
Turnout		26,233	74.99	+3.71
Eligible voters		34,981		
Liberal hold		Swing		–24.56
Source: Library of Parliament

1940 Canadian federal election
Party	Candidate	Votes	%	±%
Liberal	James Angus MacKinnon	12,350	56.87	+20.80
National Government	James Harwood Ogilvie	4,054	18.67	–7.99
New Democracy	John B. Gillies	3,695	17.02	–3.99
Co-operative Commonwealth	Mary R. Crawford	1,616	7.44	–3.53
Total valid votes		21,715	99.28	
Total rejected ballots		158	0.72	–0.37
Turnout		21,873	71.28	+1.32
Eligible voters		30,688		
Liberal hold		Swing		+14.39
Source: Library of Parliament

1935 Canadian federal election
Party	Candidate	Votes	%	±%
Liberal	James Angus MacKinnon	6,471	36.08	–14.65
Conservative	James Harwood Ogilvie	4,781	26.66	–22.62
Social Credit	James Allan Reid	3,768	21.01	–
Co-operative Commonwealth	Mary R. Crawford	1,967	10.97	–
Reconstruction	Arthur Lewis Burrows	949	5.29	–
Total valid votes		17,936	98.91	
Total rejected ballots		198	1.09	+1.09
Turnout		18,134	69.96	–1.73
Eligible voters		25,919		
Liberal hold		Swing		+18.63
Source: Library of Parliament

1930 Canadian federal election
Party	Candidate	Votes	%	±%
Liberal	Charles Stewart	9,223	50.72	–4.86
Conservative	Frederick Jamieson	8,960	49.28	+4.86
Total valid votes		18,183	100.00	
Total rejected ballots		unknown		
Turnout		18,183	71.69	+12.94
Eligible voters		25,365		
Liberal hold		Swing		–4.86
Source: Library of Parliament

Canadian federal by-election, November 2, 1926 Ministerial by-election for Charles Stewart
Party	Candidate	Votes	%
Liberal	Charles Stewart	acclaimed	–
Source: Library of Parliament

1926 Canadian federal election
Party	Candidate	Votes	%	±%
Liberal	Charles Stewart	7,223	55.58	+6.80
Conservative	Frederick Jamieson	5,772	44.42	+8.51
Total valid votes		12,995	100.00	
Total rejected ballots		unknown		
Turnout		12,995	58.75	+2.28
Eligible voters		22,118		
Liberal hold		Swing		+7.66
Source: Library of Parliament

1925 Canadian federal election
Party	Candidate	Votes	%	±%
Liberal	Charles Stewart	6,394	48.78	+11.47
Conservative	James McCrie Douglas	4,706	35.90	+16.64
Farmer–Labour	James East	2,007	15.31	–
Total valid votes		13,107	100.00	
Total rejected ballots		unknown		
Turnout		13,107	56.47	–3.32
Eligible voters		23,210		
Liberal gain from Progressive		Swing		+14.05
Source: Library of Parliament

1921 Canadian federal election
Party	Candidate	Votes	%	±%
Progressive	Donald MacBeth Kennedy	10,011	43.42	–
Liberal	Frank Oliver	8,603	37.32	–
Conservative	Robert Campbell	4,441	19.26	–
Total valid votes		23,055	100.00	
Total rejected ballots		unknown		
Turnout		23,055	59.79	–34.18
Eligible voters		38,557		
Progressive gain from Government (Unionist)		Swing		+40.37
Source: Library of Parliament

1917 Canadian federal election
Party	Candidate	Votes	%	±%
Government (Unionist)	William Antrobus Griesbach	9,637	58.14	–
Opposition (Laurier Liberals)	Frank Oliver	6,939	41.86	–
Total valid votes		16,576	100.00	
Total rejected ballots		unknown		
Turnout		16,576	93.97	–
Eligible voters		17,640		
Note: The vote tallies recorded here are the final ones after Army votes were added. Votes cast actually in Edmonton had Oliver the winner by more than 100 votes.
Source: Library of Parliament

== See also ==
- Edmonton West provincial electoral district
- List of Canadian electoral districts
- Historical federal electoral districts of Canada
