= Anne McLellan =

Canadian academic and politician

The Honourable Anne McLellan PC OC AOE
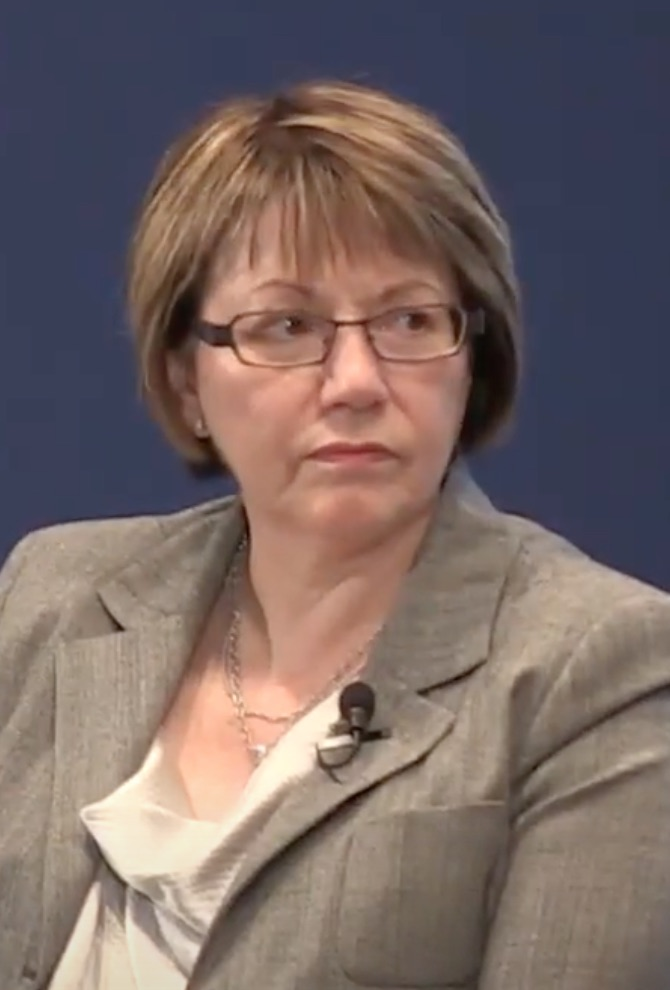
- McLellan in 2011

9th Deputy Prime Minister of Canada
- In office December 12, 2003 – February 6, 2006
- Prime Minister: Paul Martin
- Preceded by: John Manley
- Succeeded by: Chrystia Freeland (2019) (Note: There was no deputy prime minister from February 6, 2006, until November 20, 2019.)

Minister of Public Safety and Emergency Preparedness
- In office April 4, 2005 – February 6, 2006
- Prime Minister: Paul Martin
- Preceded by: Herself (as Solicitor General)
- Succeeded by: Stockwell Day

Solicitor General of Canada
- In office December 12, 2003 – April 3, 2005
- Prime Minister: Jean Chrétien; Paul Martin
- Preceded by: Wayne Easter
- Succeeded by: Herself (as Minister of Public Safety and Emergency Preparedness)

Minister of Health
- In office January 15, 2002 – December 12, 2003
- Prime Minister: Jean Chrétien
- Preceded by: Allan Rock
- Succeeded by: Pierre Pettigrew

Minister of Justice Attorney General of Canada
- In office June 11, 1997 – January 14, 2002
- Prime Minister: Jean Chrétien
- Preceded by: Allan Rock
- Succeeded by: Martin Cauchon

Minister of Natural Resources
- In office November 4, 1993 – June 10, 1997
- Prime Minister: Jean Chretien
- Preceded by: Bobbie Sparrow
- Succeeded by: Ralph Goodale

Member of Parliament for Edmonton Centre (Edmonton West; 1997–2004) (Edmonton Northwest; 1993–1997)
- In office October 25, 1993 – January 23, 2006
- Preceded by: Murray Dorin
- Succeeded by: Laurie Hawn

Personal details
- Born: August 31, 1950 (age 76) Hants County, Nova Scotia, Canada
- Party: Liberal
- Education: Dalhousie University (BA, LLB); King's College London (LLM)
- Profession: Lawyer, law professor, politician

A. Anne McLellan (born August 31, 1950) is a Canadian politician and academic who served as the ninth deputy prime minister of Canada from 2003 to 2006. She was a cabinet minister in the Liberal governments of Jean Chrétien and Paul Martin, and represented Edmonton in the House of Commons of Canada. She also held the positions of solicitor general, minister of health, and Attorney General and minister of justice of Canada.

== Early life ==
McLellan earned bachelor's degrees in Arts and Law from Halifax's Dalhousie University. She then earned a Master of Laws from King's College London in the United Kingdom in 1975.

She became a professor of law, first at the University of New Brunswick and then, beginning in 1980, at the University of Alberta Faculty of Law where she served at various times as associate dean and dean. She has also been on the board of directors of the Canadian Civil Liberties Association.

== Political career ==
Her first foray into politics was as the Liberal candidate for the riding of Edmonton Northwest in the 1993 general election, when she won her seat by 12 votes over the first runner-up candidate. She quickly became a rising star in the Liberal Party, being one of four Liberals elected in Alberta, and was named to cabinet as Minister of Natural Resources. McLellan has the prenominal "the Honourable" and the postnominal "PC" for life by virtue of being made a member of the Queen's Privy Council for Canada on November 4, 1993.

Ahead of the 1997 election, Edmonton Northwest was abolished in changes to the boundaries of the federal ridings. She was re-elected by narrow margins in the re-established riding of Edmonton West in 1997 and 2000, despite the Liberals' general unpopularity in Alberta. Her narrow victory in 1993 earned her the nickname "Landslide Annie" in Canadian political circles.

McLellan served as Attorney General and Minister of Justice from 1997 until 2002, with responsibility for implementing new anti-terror and security laws following the September 11 attacks in the United States, and the implementation of the Canadian gun registry. She served as Minister of Health from 2002 to 2003.

Though she supported Paul Martin for the Liberal leadership, Jean Chrétien retained her in his cabinet, in part because Chrétien wanted an Albertan in his cabinet for the sake of regional representation.

=== Deputy prime minister ===
On being sworn in as Prime Minister on December 12, 2003, Paul Martin named her his deputy prime minister. McLellan was also named minister for the newly created Department of Public Safety and Emergency Preparedness. As Deputy Prime Minister, she was also chair of the Cabinet Operations Committee. McLellan's appointment was one of a number of women given senior positions in the Paul Martin government.

During the 2004 federal election, she was re-elected by 721 votes, or just over 1% of the vote, defeating Laurie Hawn of the Conservative Party of Canada in the re-formed riding of Edmonton Centre, where she ran after her Edmonton West constituency was abolished.

In the 2006 federal election, the Conservatives won government and Hawn defeated McLellan by 45.01% to 38.36%.

McLellan is one of the few Canadian parliamentarians to have spent her entire career as a cabinet member. This is due to the fact that McLellan was elected to parliament as a Liberal from Alberta, a historically weak province for the party. Serving as the only Liberal MP from the province, her inclusion as a cabinet member, and later elevation as Deputy Prime Minister, was tantamount to ensuring regional representation.

== After politics ==
On May 12, 2006, McLellan was appointed Distinguished Scholar in Residence to the University of Alberta at the Canadian university's Institute for United States Policy Studies. On June 27, 2006, she also became counsel to the Edmonton-based law firm Bennett Jones LLP. She also became a director on the boards of Nexen Inc., Agrium Inc. and Cameco Corporation.

On July 1, 2009, McLellan was appointed an officer of the Order of Canada for her service as a politician and law professor, and for her contributions as a community volunteer.

On May 9, 2013, she was appointed to the Alberta Order of Excellence for her achievements in politics, law and advanced education.

In 2015, she was appointed Chancellor of Dalhousie University.

On November 28, 2017, Pearson College UWC named her the chair of its board of directors.

On October 29, 2019, following the 2019 Canadian federal election, in which the Liberal Party did not win any seats in Alberta and Saskatchewan, the Prime Minister's Office announced that Prime Minister Justin Trudeau had hired McLellan as an adviser. The Office said McLellan would assist the prime minister as he formed a government against the backdrop of a growing sentiment of western alienation.

In the 2025 Liberal Party of Canada leadership election, she endorsed Mark Carney.

=== Policy report writer ===
In 2016, McLellan was appointed as the chair of the Task Force on Marijuana Legalization and Regulation, created to provide recommendations on the design of a new system to legalize, strictly regulate and restrict recreational use of marijuana, despite her position within Bennett Jones. The process included an opportunity for the public to provide their own input. On December 13, 2016, the panel's report was released to the news media; its recommendations were not binding on the legislators.

On March 18, 2019, in the context of the SNC-Lavalin affair Prime Minister Justin Trudeau, announced that McLellan would serve as a special advisor on whether a single minister should continue to hold the positions of Minister of Justice and Attorney General of Canada. She was also asked to analyze the operating policies and practices across the Cabinet, and the role of public servants and political staff in their interactions with the minister of justice and attorney general of Canada. She was asked to provide independent recommendations (sic) to the Prime Minister by June 30, 2019.

On July 23, 2020 it was announced by Nova Scotia justice minister Mark Furey and federal minister of public safety and emergency preparedness Bill Blair that McLellan would serve on a 3-person Independent Review Panel concerning the RCMP response to the mass shooting that occurred in Nova Scotia on April 18/19, 2020. Families of the 22 victims killed during the shooting reacted to the announcement with disappointment, as they had been calling for a full public inquiry.

== Notes ==
27th Canadian Ministry (2003–2006) – Cabinet of Paul Martin
Cabinet posts (3)
Predecessor	Office	Successor
legislation enacted	Minister of Public Safety and Emergency Preparedness; 2005–2006	Stockwell Day
Wayne Easter	Solicitor General of Canada; 2003–2005 styled as Minister of Public Safety and Emergency Preparedness	position abolished / legislation enacted
John Manley	Deputy Prime Minister of Canada; 2003–2006	Chrystia Freeland
26th Canadian Ministry (1993–2003) – Cabinet of Jean Chrétien
Cabinet posts (5)
Predecessor	Office	Successor
Allan Rock	Minister of Health; 2002–2003	Pierre Pettigrew
Allan Rock	Minister of Justice; 1997–2002	Martin Cauchon
legislation enacted	Minister of Natural Resources; 1995–1997	Ralph Goodale
Bobbie Sparrow	Minister of Energy, Mines and Resources; 1993–1995 styled as Minister of Natural Resources	legislation enacted
Bobbie Sparrow	Minister of Forestry; 1993–1995 styled as Minister of Natural Resources	legislation enacted
Special Cabinet Responsibilities
Predecessor	Title	Successor
Jim Edwards	Federal Interlocutor for Métis and Non-Status Indians; 1993–1997	Ralph Goodale
Parliament of Canada
Preceded by Murray Dorin	Member of Parliament for Edmonton Northwest; 1993–1997	District abolished
Preceded by Murray Dorin	Member of Parliament for Edmonton West; 1997–2004	District abolished
Preceded by Steve Paproski	Member of Parliament for Edmonton Centre; 2004–2006	Succeeded by Laurie Hawn
Academic offices
Preceded by Fred Fountain	Chancellor of Dalhousie University; 2015 – present	Incumbent
