= Harry Hays =

Canadian politician

The Honourable Harry Hays PC
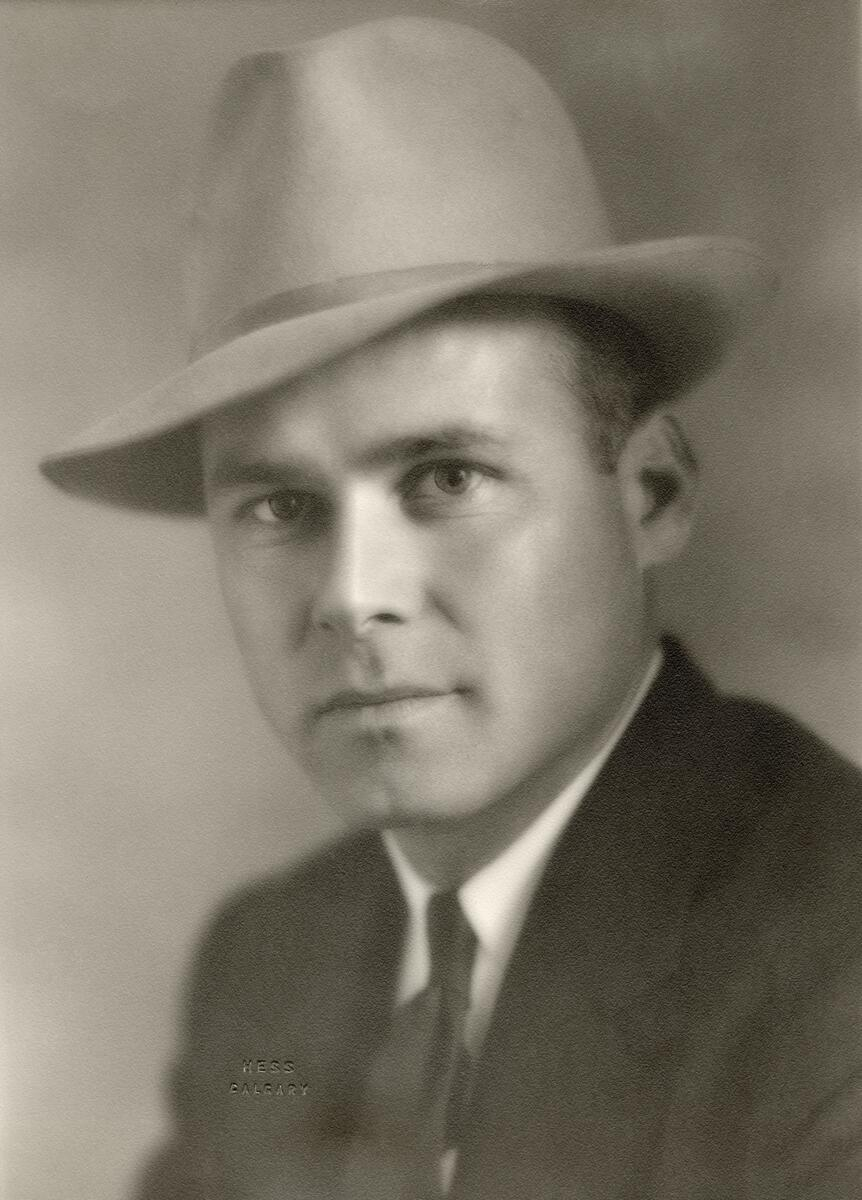
- Harry Hays in 1934

Minister of Agriculture
- In office 22 April 1963 – 17 December 1965
- Prime Minister: Lester B. Pearson
- Preceded by: Alvin Hamilton
- Succeeded by: Joe Greene

Canadian Senator from Alberta
- In office 24 February 1966 – 4 May 1982
- Preceded by: Aristide Blais; John Alexander Buchanan
- Succeeded by: Dan Hays; Joyce Fairbairn

Member of Parliament for Calgary South
- In office 8 April 1963 – 7 November 1965
- Preceded by: Arthur Ryan Smith
- Succeeded by: Harold Raymond Ballard

27th Mayor of Calgary
- In office 19 October 1959 – 30 June 1963
- Preceded by: Donald Hugh Mackay
- Succeeded by: J. W. Grant MacEwan

Personal details
- Born: Harry William Hays; 25 December 1909 Carstairs, Alberta, Canada
- Died: 4 May 1982 (aged 72) Ottawa, Ontario, Canada
- Party: Liberal
- Spouse: Muriel Biglund (m. 1943)
- Children: 2, including Dan
- Occupation: Auctioneer; rancher; farmer

Harry William Hays PC (25 December 1909 – 4 May 1982) was a Canadian politician, 27th Mayor of Calgary, Cabinet minister in the government of Lester B. Pearson, and Senator from Alberta.

== Personal life ==
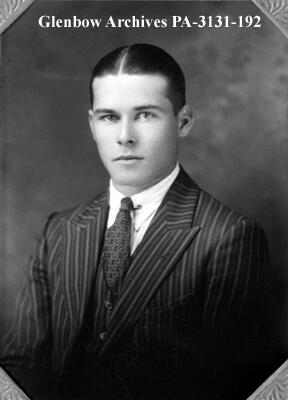
Harry Hays in 1930.

Born in Carstairs, Alberta, to a family originally from Missouri, Hays had several careers related to agriculture. He was an auctioneer, rancher and breeder as well as a radio broadcaster. He was a founding member and president of the Alberta Poultry Breeders' Association and also served as president of the Alberta Holstein Breeders' Association. He led the Canadian Swine Breeders during World War II when it initiated the "Bacon for Britain" campaign of increased production as part of the war effort. In the 1950s, he pioneered exporting cattle by airplane allowing the Canadian industry to develop new markets in Mexico and the United Kingdom. Hays is the creator and namesake of the Hays Converter beef cattle breed.

Harry Hays is credited with starting the Calgary Stampede pancake breakfast tradition.

In 1934 Hays married Muriel Biglund and had one son Daniel Hays, who was a former member of the Senate of Canada appointed in 1984 where he served as Speaker and Leader of the Opposition.

== Political life ==
=== Mayor of Calgary ===
While Hays had never run for political office prior to 1959, it was generally believed that he made his 1959 run at the urging of business colleagues who were concerned about the City of Calgary's rising debt, which would reach $82 million in 1960. In 1959 Hays would sell his dairy farm on the southern outskirts of the city to developers for $1 million, the land would eventually form the community of Haysboro. (Note: Foran (2013), p. 23.)

Hays was elected the 27th mayor of Calgary in the October 1959 Calgary municipal election. Hays defeated popular incumbent mayor Donald Hugh MacKay following the damning report from the Turcotte Inquiry which concluded MacKay had used his position as mayor for improper personal gain. Turcotte would note that MacKay "derived a direct improper advantage through his position as mayor". Hays would be re-elected for a second term in the 1961 Calgary municipal election. Harry Hays resigned effective June 30, 1963, Grant MacEwan appointed as mayor by council and sworn on July 3, 1963.

During his time as mayor, it was noted that Hays quickly gained the confidence of council, city commissioners, the press and public, which made him an attractive candidate for Pearson's Liberals. Hays campaigned on more efficiency in government, and the creation of a robust business climate. For his 1961 re-election, Hays made good on his election promise to reduce debt, claiming he had lowered the per capita debt by $11. (Note: Foran (2013), p. 24.)

Following pressure by Hays directed to the Canadian Pacific Railway regarding a lack of development on the downtown rail right-of-way, the CPR would dispatch employee and future City of Calgary Mayor Rod Sykes to work with Hays to reach a solution. In June 1962 Sykes and Hays would announce CPR led development into a two-block project east of the Palliser Hotel. Hays did not inform his colleagues on council of the announcement, besides Alderman Jack Leslie, and would be censured by in a following council meeting. Despite the rebuke by his peers, Hays was defiant noting "You will be getting these projects from me as long as I am in the chair (Mayor)", to which his fellow councillors reacted by capitulation to the comments, recognizing the power and influence Hays held. (Note: Foran (2013), pp. 31–33.) The CPR redevelopment scheme would eventually fail to materialize by June 1964. (Note: Foran (2013), p. 179.)

Harry Hays would also prove to be an ardent supporter of the Calgary Municipal Airport and its continued growth. Hays would lead a delegation to Ottawa to lobby the Department of Transport and Minister of Transport George Hees to provide the Airport with official "International Status". The federal government did not agree with the request, but as a compromise renamed the passenger terminal from "Calgary Municipal Airport" to "Calgary International Airport". Public and council support ensured the remaining area of the airport including the runway would remain called "McCall Field" after Calgary aviator and First World War ace Fred McCall.

=== Federal politics ===
Hays was recruited by Lester Pearson to run for the Liberals in the 1963 federal election in Calgary South, defeating Progressive Conservative opponent, current Aldermen, and future Calgary Mayor Jack Leslie. Hays would be the only Liberal Member of Parliament elected in Alberta or Saskatchewan. At the time, Calgary South was considered a conservative stronghold and Hays would have a difficult contest against his conservative opponent Leslie. Hays was able to garner significant financial support through his 60-person-strong "Citizens for Hays Committee", which included Aldermen Grant MacEwan and P.N.R. Morrison, and several prominent businessmen including Carl Nickle, James K. Gray, Harry Cohen, Jack Pierce, and Peter Rule. On April 5, just three days prior to the federal election, Hays would announce an agreement with CPR for a "$35 Million Face-Lift for Calgary" which would result in "a rebuilt downtown within two decades." Hays' opponent Jack Leslie would later admit to seeing this announcement as a political ploy. (Note: Foran (2013), pp. 62–64.)

Upon his election Hays would join Pearson's cabinet as Minister of Agriculture. Hays was often absent from the House and initially continued to serve as Calgary's mayor after his election to parliament. He also continued his work as an auctioneer as well as his volunteer duties for the Rotary Club.

Hays had little formal education and was popular for his down to earth manner of living and talking and often swore and used poor grammar and colourful expressions. He described his agricultural policy by saying "We want a flush-toilet, not an outhouse, farm economy for Canada". However, some of his views were unpopular with farmers, such as his opposition to farm subsidies. He advocated a minimum guaranteed income for farmers and a system of marketing boards. During his tenure as minister the Dairy Commission Act was introduced establishing an agency to purchase, store and market dairy products. He was also responsible for the Farm Machinery Syndicate Credit Act which extended loans to farmers to buy machinery co-operatively. Journalist Walter Stewart once wrote of Hays that "No minister seems more inept inside Parliament and few get so much done outside it."

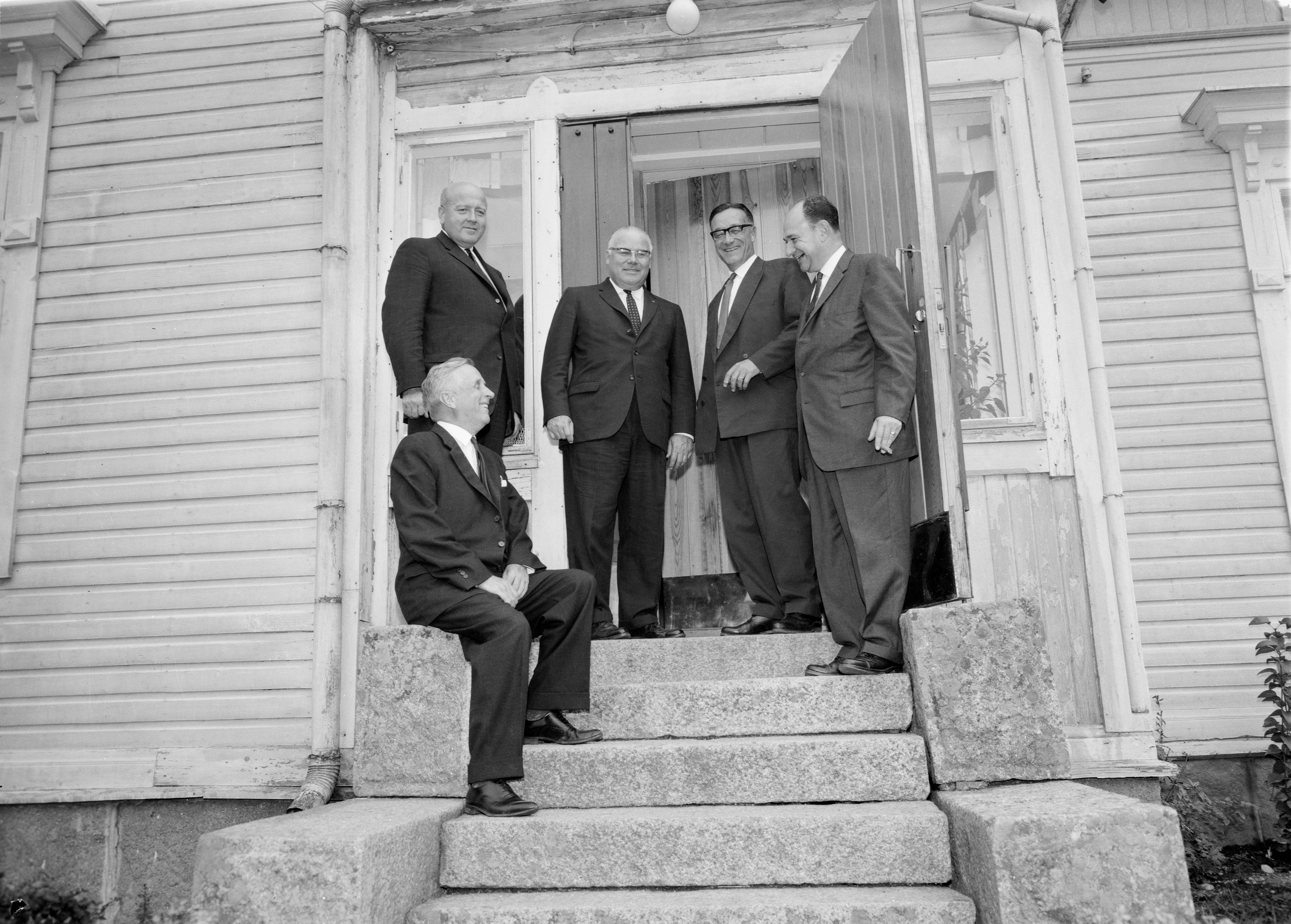
Harry Hays (standing third from the right) during his visit to Finland in 1963.

Hays also established the Western College of Veterinary Medicine in Saskatoon and was responsible for expanding crop insurance and introducing a national farm accounting system.

Hays and Tory Alvin Hamilton were bitter rivals with Hamilton denigrating Hays' efforts regularly. Hays once challenged Hamilton to prove he could beat Hays in a cow milking contest but the competition never came to pass.

Hays was defeated in his attempt to retain his seat in the 1965 federal election by Progressive Conservative candidate and two-term Calgary Aldermen Ray Ballard by a margin of 115 votes. Hays' loss can be attributed to the limited popularity of the Liberal government in Alberta, however, Hays was appointed to the Senate of Canada in 1966 on the advice of Pearson and served on the Senate's agriculture committee for a number of years.

In 1980 he co-chaired the special joined committee of the Senate and House of Commons on the Canadian Constitution and was an advocate of the Canadian Charter of Rights and Freedoms and of reducing the Senate's power to veto legislation approved by the House of Commons.

== Later life ==
He died in office in 1982 following heart surgery.

== Honours ==
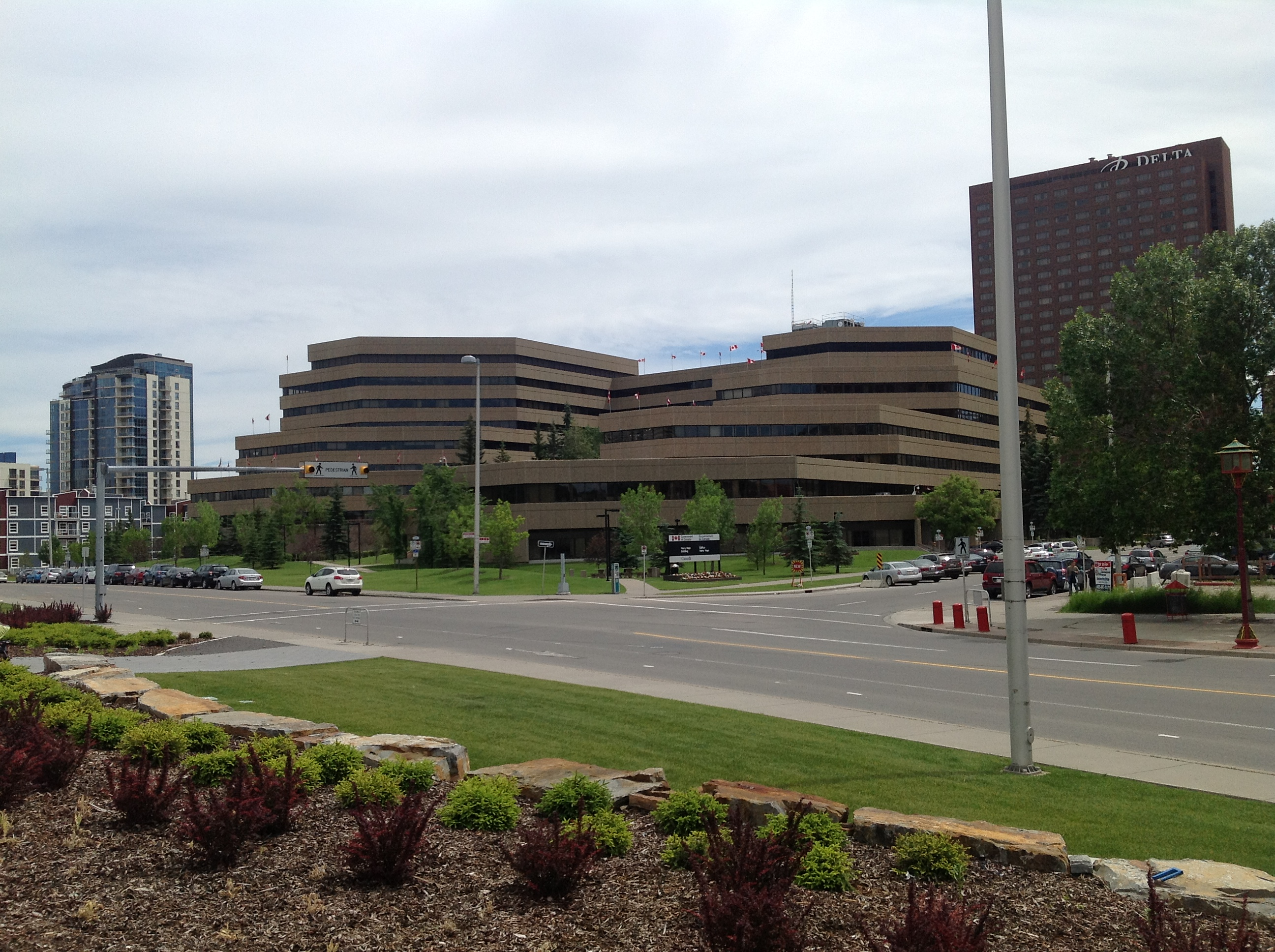
Harry Hays Building in Calgary

- The federal building in downtown Calgary at 220 4 Ave SE, the Harry Hays Building, is named in his honour. The building is an 8-story, 671,500 square foot building covering an entire block next to the Bow River, designed by Chandler Kennedy and completed in 1978.
- The provincial electoral district Calgary-Hays located in Southern Calgary is named in his honour.
- The community of Haysboro in Calgary, was built on land Harry Hays sold in 1959.

== Archives ==
There is a Harry William Hays fonds at Library and Archives Canada.

== See also ==
- Hays Converter

Political offices
Preceded by Donald Hugh Mackay	Mayor of Calgary; 1960–1963	Succeeded by John Walter Grant MacEwan
Parliament of Canada
Preceded by Arthur Ryan Smith	Member of Parliament Calgary South; 1963–1965	Succeeded by Harold Raymond Ballard
Preceded by Aristide Blais; John Alexander Buchanan	Senator Alberta; 1966–1982	Succeeded by Dan Hays; Joyce Fairbairn
