= Western Canada High School =

Coordinates: 51.037360°N 114.077302°W

Location
- 641 17 Avenue SW; Calgary, Alberta, T2S 0B5

Information
- Former name: Western Canada College (1903–1926)
- Type: Public
- Motto: Intelligentia, Vires, Virtus
- Established: 1903
- School board: Calgary Board of Education
- Principal: Darrin Whitbread
- Grades: 10–12
- Enrollment: 2229 (2025-2026)
  - Grade 10: 708
  - Grade 11: 751
  - Grade 12: 770
- Team name: Redhawks
- Yearbook: Acatec
- Communities served: Mount Royal, Mission, Cliff Bungalow, Connaught
- Website: school.cbe.ab.ca/school/westerncanada/Pages/default.aspx

Western Canada High School is a public high school in Calgary, Alberta that has operated since 1929. The high school was antedated by Western Canada College, a boys' preparatory school in the style of a British public school that opened in 1903. The College existed until the end of the 1926 academic year when it closed due to financial problems. The Calgary Board of Education purchased the property that year, and by September 1929 completed a group of new school buildings on the site. From 1929 to 1935 academic and technical schools operated independently on the Western property, until which time they merged under a single administration.

Western Canada is one of Calgary's oldest and most prestigious educational institutions. Given its proximity to the historic upper-class neighbourhoods of Mount Royal, Elbow Park, Roxboro, and Rideau Park, it has long been associated with the city's elite and establishment. Western Canada graduates have gone on to prolific careers in politics, law, medicine, sport, the arts and sciences.

== History ==
=== Western Canada College ===
The inspiration to build an advanced school in the then North-West Territories (NWT) came from James Chalmers Herdman (1855–1910), a Scottish Presbyterian minister. In 1902, Herdman had been appointed superintendent for the missions in British Columbia and the Territory. During his travels, he heard repeatedly from settlers about the inadequacy of educational institutions in the west. Herdman repeated his findings to friends in Calgary, and soon a sub-committee of the Calgary Presbytery was struck to investigate the creation of a new school. The sub-committee consisted of Herdman, James Muir, James Short, C. A. Stuart, and W. McDavidson. In April 1903, the committee reported that the recommended name for the school be "Western Canada College." Although the school was founded under the auspices of the Presbyterian Church, it was decided that it would be non-denominational. On 19 June 1903, An Ordinance to Incorporate "Western Canada College" received assent in the Legislative Assembly of the North-West Territories.

The original school building was completed in 1903 as a British-style exclusive high school for boys called Western Canada College (not a college in the North American sense of the word). It was created by "The Western Canada College Bill of Incorporating Ordinance" enacted by the Legislature of the NWT, which Calgary was then a part of before the province of Alberta was created in 1905. To raise money for the new college, 5000 shares were sold for $10 each. Many of the original investors read like a "Who's Who" list for Alberta; Pat Burns, R. B. Bennett, A.E. Cross, William Pearce, A.C. Rutherford (who was premier at the time), and George Lane.

On Wednesday, 23 September 1903 at 9:30 am, Western opened its doors and began classes. Opening ceremonies for the school took place the next evening at Hull's Opera House in Calgary. Their ceremony was presided over by Sir Frederick Haultain, premier of the NWT. When it opened, the school had nine residential students and 19 day students. At the beginning of the second academic year in September 1904, there were 25 students in residence and 15 day students.

In the summer of 1904, the college announced plans to construct a residence building on its property. On Friday, 9 September 1904, Governor General The Earl of Minto laid the cornerstone. On Friday, 13 January 1905, the building had an informal opening where citizens were invited to tour it.

=== Western Canada High ===
A granite shaft bearing a Cross of Sacrifice was dedicated as a list of honor memorial to Western Canada College students who were killed during the First World War and who served during the Second World War, the Korean War and as peacekeepers. The cenotaph was designed by architect George Fordyce, and was a modification of a design Arthur J. Wade. It was unveiled officially on Sunday, 26 August 1928.

In 1928, the board planned three new buildings on the Western Canada site: a three-storey (west) academic wing, three-storey (east) technical wing, and one-storey shops wing. The contract for the technical wing was given to Bennett and White in September 1928 for $138,126. While the building was under construction, on 8 April 1929 a fire broke out inside from a gas heater. The contract for the academic wing was given on 4 March 1929 to Bennett and White for $163,270. The contract to build the one-storey shops wing and power plant was awarded to Bennett and White on 29 April 1929 for around $40,000. Controversy arose over the smoke stack that would be constructed adjacent the shops wing. The stack was originally to be 125 feet high, however, residents in the neighbourhood protested that the structure would make the area look industrial, thus decreasing their house prices. They protested the plan, and the smoke stack height was decreased to 80 feet. The three new buildings were completed in August 1929, and on Tuesday, 3 September, the new school was opened to students for registration. Classes began on Monday, 9 September.

On 21 June 1935, trustees in favour of construction of a new combined auditorium and gymnasium at Western. On 12 September, the construction contract was awarded to McDonald Brothers for $25,948. Work began that month and was completed by early December. Opening ceremonies took place on the evening of Friday, 13 December and were presided over by F. E. Spooner, retiring chairman of the school board. On Saturday, 8 November 1936 the structure caught fire and was burned to the ground. The estimated loss was $33,000. On 12 November, the board called a special meeting and voted to rebuild the structure. Work on the replacement auditorium began in February 1937, but was delayed by building material shortages. The structure, although not completely finished, was ready to be used for graduation ceremonies on 8 June.

In 1958, the school board recommended a major addition to the school to help it accommodate more students. The addition would connect the 1929 west and east wings. Construction of the new building necessitated the demolition of the last remaining Western Canada College building, the 1906 brick academic building that had remained in use as the school library when the high school opened.

In June 1964, the board of education approved a major expansion programme at the school. Part of this would be completed under the auspices of the Technical and Vocational Training Assistance Act. The expansion began in 1965 with the construction of three auto shops and two classrooms, built onto the old shops wing. In 1966, a new classroom wing was constructed. The final phase of the addition came in 1967, when the school added its auxiliary gymnasium, theatre, and band room. This addition was designed by architect Alton McCaul Bowers.

Western's last addition was made in 1981. That year, the school constructed a new gymnasium and a drama room behind the theatre. To build the new gymnasium, part of the existing 1937 gym was removed, and the remaining section was converted to a cafeteria. The new gym was built perpendicular to the old on the south side of the school.

== Academics ==
=== Special programs ===
The school provides French and English language as a primary language instruction. In addition, it is one of a select number of schools in Calgary to offer French immersion. Western is one of a small number of Calgary high schools to offer an International Baccalaureate (IB) Diploma Programme. The school also offers an extensive performing and visual arts program, and offers a certificate to recognize students that have made fine arts a focus of learning at the high school level. The school is part of the Action for Bright Children Society.

== Athletics ==
The Western Redhawks compete under the governance of the Alberta Schools Athletic Association and Calgary Senior High School Athletic Association

The school has teams in the following sports:

- Badminton
- Basketball
- Cheerleading
- Cross Country
- Field Hockey
- Football
- Golf
- Rugby
- Soccer
- Swim and Dive
- Track and Field
- Ultimate Frisbee
- Volleyball
- Wrestling

== Notable alumni ==
=== Western Canada College ===
- Allan Turner Bone – businessman
- L. Y. Cairns – judge
- Alfred Williams Carter – World War I ace
- Alexander Campbell DesBrisay – judge
- George Leslie Jennison – president of the Toronto Stock Exchange
- Frank C. Lynch-Staunton – 11th Lieutenant-Governor of Alberta
- Donald MacLaren – World War I ace
- Emil Sick – industrialist

=== Western Canada High School ===
- Ron Allbright – CFL player 1956–1967
- Conrad Bain – actor
- Ryan Belleville – actor, writer
- Barney Bentall – singer/songwriter
- Braids – art rock band
- Stewart Cameron – cartoonist
- Karen Connelly – novelist and poet
- Jaime Czarkowski - synchronized swimmer
- Jim Dinning – Member of the Legislative Assembly of Alberta 1986–1997
- Reid Duke – first hockey player signed by the Vegas Golden Knights
- Emerson Frostad – baseball player
- George Hansen – CFL player 1959–1966
- Dan Hays – Senator 1984–2007
- Norman Kwong – CFL player 1948–1960; Lieutenant Governor of Alberta 2005–2010
- Jack Leslie – Mayor of Calgary 1965–1969
- Jan Lisiecki – concert pianist
- Suzette Mayr – novelist and poet
- Tate McRae – dancer and singer/songwriter (born 2003)
- Josh Morrissey – defenceman, Winnipeg Jets
- Carl Nickle – founder of the Daily Oil Bulletin; Member of Parliament 1951–1957
- Larry Robinson – CFL player 1961–1975
- Lorna Slater - Scottish politician
- Kinnie Starr – singer/songwriter
- David Swann – politician
- Taryn Swiatek – soccer player
- Graham Vigrass – Canadian Men's Olympic Volleyball Player

== Bibliography ==
- Gloria Ann Dingwall, 100: A Western Portrait, (Self published, 2003).
