= Frank Gordon Buchanan =

Canadian educationalist (–1981)

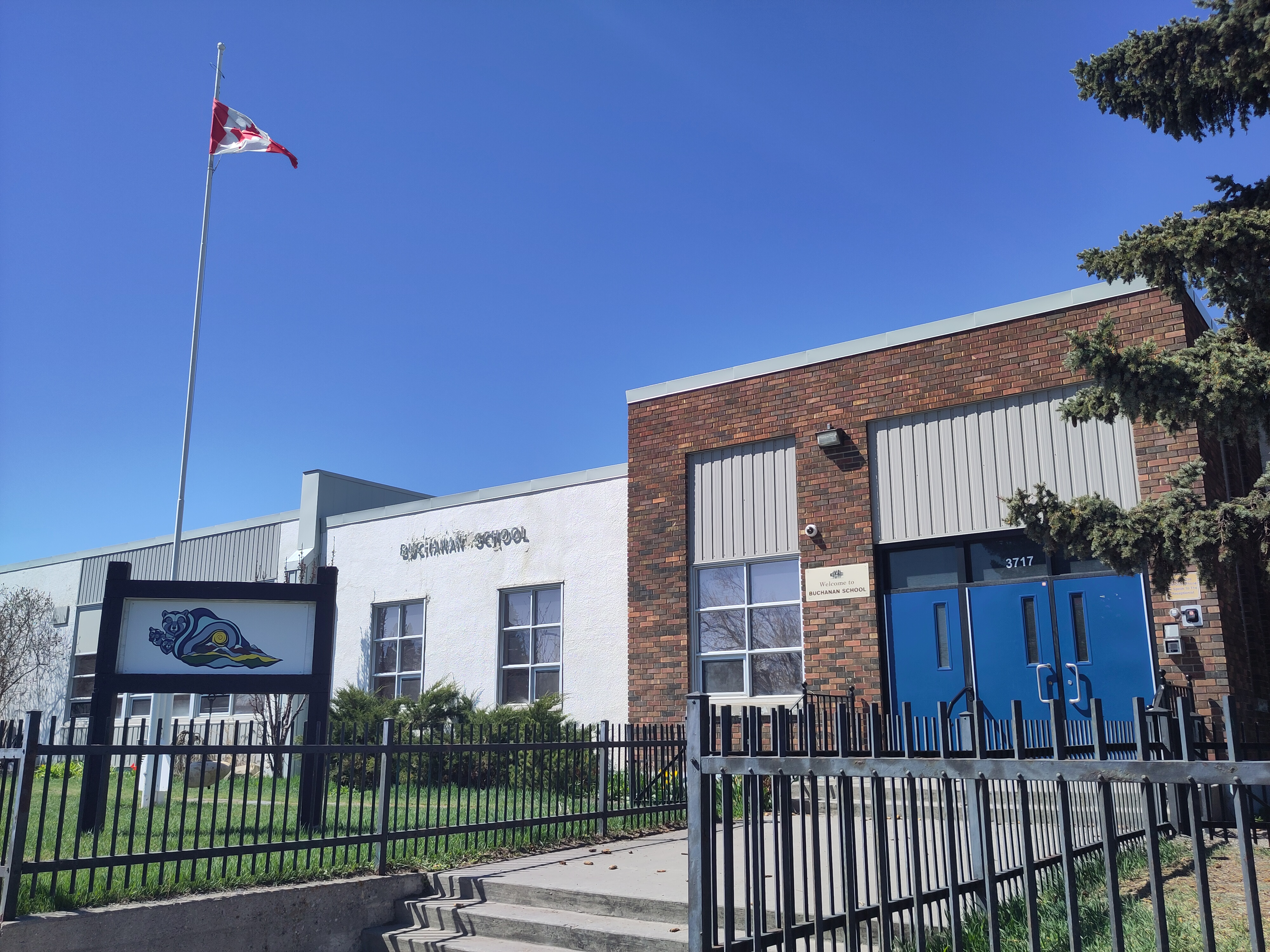
Buchanan School, Calgary, Alberta, named after Frank G. Buchanan.

Frank Gordon Buchanan (died aged 95, Vancouver General Hospital, April 16 1981) was chief superintendent of public schools in Calgary, Alberta from 1935 to 1951.

== Early life and education ==
Buchanan was born in or around 1886 in Rossburn, Manitoba. His mother was born in Mallorytown, Ontario (which was named after her own grandfather, David Mallory) on 26 February 1858. She married the Methodist minister Dr. Thomas C. Buchanan. The two moved to "a sod shack near Rossburn" and had four children: Judd Elliott, who became a lawyer and teacher; Nelles V. Buchanan, who became Edmonton's district court chief judge; Gladys Morgan; and Frank Gordon Buchanan. The family soon moved to Alberta, where Thomas Buchanan became minister of McDougall Church in 1899. Accordingly, Frank was educated in Calgary, Regina, and Edmonton. He completed normal school in Regina and became principal of Victoria School, Calgary. He then moved on to the University of Toronto, graduating B.A. in 1913. He later went on to take M.A. and B.Paed. degrees.

== Career ==
On graduation from Toronto in 1913, Buchanan joined the staff of Central High School, Calgary. In 1914, however, he became a provincial school inspector, working in Hanna, Lacombe, Medicine Hat, and Calgary. He held this position until 1929, when he became assistant superintendent of Calgary schools, and then superintendent in 1935. In 1937 he visited the British Isles to tour schools, at the invitation of the British Directors of Education.

As chief superintendent of Calgary's public schools, Buchanan oversaw the building of seventeen schools and auditoriums, costing $3.5 million.

== Politics ==
Buchanan stood for election as a Liberal member of parliament for Calgary West in the 1951 federal by-election prompted by the resignation of Arthur LeRoy Smith, hoping to become Alberta's only Liberal MP, under the slogan "he will devote all his time to serving you". In an editorial for the Regina-based The Leader Post, C. W. Mowers opined that "Dr. Buchanan is doubtless one of the most capable, forthright and genuinely progressive candidates ever to be presented to Alberta voters, but his age is somewhat against him". He lost to the Conservative Party candidate Carl O. Nickle.

== Voluntarism ==
Buchanan served on the University of Alberta's senate from 1942 to 1948, and also on the board of governors of Mount Royal University (of which his father had been a founder-member). According to The Calgary Herald, "on his retirement, Buchanan said in a speech that experience and 'real education' are more valuable to children than mastery of facts. Buchanan said the school system should prepare students for community life through group activities".

Other community activities included being president of the Calgary Kiwanis Club in 1944–45 and a member of the board of stewards of the Central United Church.

Buchanan retired to Vancouver in late March 1953.

== Personal life ==
Buchanan married Florence Marie and had four children: Gordon, Thomas Hugh, Douglas, and Muriel Armstrong.

== Awards and recognition ==
In the fall convocation of 1947, the University of Alberta awarded Buchanan an honorary Doctor of Laws degree "in recognition of his services to education".

=== Buchanan School ===
A Calgary elementary school, Buchanan School, was named after Frank Buchanan.
