= Donald Hugh Mackay =

Canadian politician

Donald Hugh MacKay

Mayor of Calgary
- In office January 1, 1950 – October 19, 1959
- Preceded by: James Cameron Watson
- Succeeded by: Harry Hays

Personal details
- Born: December 25, 1909 Lethbridge, Alberta, Canada
- Died: January 26, 1979 (aged 64) Calgary, Alberta, Canada
- Party: Liberal Party of Canada
- Spouse: Mary Josephine Quist (m. 1938)
- Children: seven
- Occupation: broadcaster

Donald Hugh Mackay (March 22, 1914 – January 26, 1979) was the 26th Mayor of Calgary, Alberta, Canada.

== Early life ==
He spent his youth in Calgary and Drumheller, receiving most of his public school education in Drumheller. In the early 1930s, Mackay settled with his family in Calgary. He was employed first by the Calgary Albertan and later for the radio station CJCJ. By 1943, at the age of twenty-nine, he was Manager of Station CJCJ. In his early adulthood MacKay joined the Church of Jesus Christ of Latter-day Saints. He remained a participating member of the Church the rest of his life.

== Political career ==
In 1945, he ran for Calgary City Council and was elected, topping the polls for that year.

Three years later, as Alderman, Mackay led the Calgary contingent on its high-spirited and much publicized visit to the 36th Grey Cup held in Toronto, an occasion generally credited with starting the tradition of Grey Cup reverie, where he rode a horse into The Royal York Hotel, a tradition that has continued each time Calgary is in the Grey Cup.

In 1949, he was elected Mayor, serving in that capacity for ten years, a period in which the City witnessed tremendous growth. A self-proclaimed civic-booster, Mackay traveled, widely promoting Calgary. Mackay is credited with initiating the practice of the White Hatting Ceremony where visiting dignitaries are given a Smithbilt White Hat. City Council aldermen increasingly grew uncomfortable with the practice, which they viewed as a show: Alderman P.N.R. Morrison protested that "The white hats undermine efforts to establish Calgary as an oil and industrial centre", and Alderman Grant MacEwan said, "The presentations have been carried to a foolish extreme". In 1958, the City Council voted to limit the number of mayoral hat-giving ceremonies to 15 per year. Mackay responded by launching a White Hat Fund with the help of local businessmen; the white hatting ceremony was eventually taken over by Tourism Calgary.

Mackay was an enthusiastic supporter of Operation Livesaver, a 1955 mass civil defense evacuation which intended to move 40,000 Calgarians into neighbouring towns in a single day. Of a total of 25,000 possible evacuees, approximately 5,000 Calgarians participated in the drill.

MacKay was the center of the "cement scandal" which was broken by reporter Roy Farran in 1958. Calgary City Council requested the provincial government hold an inquiry following the revelation MacKay borrowed 35 bags of city cement for personal projects at his home and failed to return the bags by fall of 1958, and in October 1958, Premier and Attorney General Ernest Manning ordered Judge L. Sherman Turcotte to hold an inquiry. The resulting report (Turcotte Inquiry) published in July 1959 outlined a number of improper gifts and benefits received during MacKay's time as Mayor of Calgary from individuals seeking public contracts or approvals from the City. The benefits included a dishwasher, $1,200 in furniture, free flights to Mexico and Hawaii, two $2,000 loans which were both written off, and an addition to his home at no cost. Turcotte would note that MacKay "derived a direct improper advantage through his position as mayor".

MacKay would run for re-election as mayor following the scandal in the October 14, 1959 election, losing a close contest against Harry Hays.

Mackay made two unsuccessful bids in Federal politics as a member of the Liberal Party, first in the 1949 Canadian federal election in Calgary East losing to Douglas Harkness, and again in the 1957 in Calgary South losing to Arthur Ryan Smith.

== Later life ==
In 1962, he joined the Downtown Development Corporation in Phoenix, Arizona and later, worked for the Calgary Convention Centre and the realty firm of Cowley and Keith. Mackay died after a stroke on January 26, 1979.
