= Calgary South =

Former federal electoral district in Alberta, Canada

Alberta electoral district

Defunct federal electoral district
- Legislature: House of Commons
- District created: 1953
- District abolished: 1988
- First contested: 1952
- Last contested: 1984

Calgary South was a federal electoral district in Alberta, Canada, that was represented in the House of Commons of Canada from 1953 to 1988. This riding was created in 1952 from parts of Bow River, Calgary West and Calgary East ridings.

It was abolished in 1987 when it was redistributed into Calgary Southwest and Calgary West ridings.

== Members of Parliament ==
Calgary South
Parliament	Years	Member	Party
Electoral district created from Bow River, Calgary West and Calgary East
22nd	1953–1957	Carl Nickle	Progressive Conservative
23rd	1957–1958	Arthur Ryan Smith	Progressive Conservative
24th	1958–1962	Arthur Ryan Smith	Progressive Conservative
25th	1962–1963	Arthur Ryan Smith	Progressive Conservative
26th	1963–1965	Harry Hays	Liberal
27th	1965–1968	Harold Raymond Ballard	Progressive Conservative
28th	1968–1972	Patrick Morgan Mahoney	Liberal
29th	1972–1974	Peter Bawden	Progressive Conservative
30th	1974–1979	Peter Bawden	Progressive Conservative
31st	1979–1980	John William Thomson	Progressive Conservative
32nd	1980–1984	John William Thomson	Progressive Conservative
33rd	1984–1988	Bobbie Sparrow	Progressive Conservative
Electoral district dissolved into Calgary Southwest and Calgary West

== Election results ==
=== 1984 ===
Location of Calgary South within Calgary between the 1976 and 1987 representation orders

1984 Canadian federal election
Party	Candidate	Votes	%	±%
Progressive Conservative	Bobbie Sparrow	55,590	77.91	+9.79
Liberal	Harold Millican	7,827	10.97	–11.99
New Democratic	Brendan Quigley	6,135	8.60	+3.11
Confederation of Regions	Phyllis Kobley	866	1.21	–
Independent	Larry R. Heather	800	1.12	–
Commonwealth of Canada	Bill Bohdan	136	0.19	–
Total valid votes		71,354	99.80	
Total rejected ballots		144	0.20	+0.07
Turnout		71,498	75.37	+10.31
Eligible voters		94,859		
Progressive Conservative hold		Swing		+10.89
Source: Elections Canada

=== 1980 ===
1980 Canadian federal election
Party	Candidate	Votes	%	±%
Progressive Conservative	John William Thomson	34,873	68.12	+1.58
Liberal	Madeline J. Hombert	11,754	22.96	–3.09
New Democratic	Cathie McCreary	2,812	5.49	–0.80
Rhinoceros	David Fred Lambe	887	1.73	–
Independent	Walter Petrigo	527	1.03	–
Social Credit	Alma E. Hancock	305	0.60	–0.21
Marxist–Leninist	André Vachon	34	0.07	–
Total valid votes		51,192	99.87	
Total rejected ballots		69	0.13	–0.07
Turnout		51,261	65.06	–9.88
Eligible voters		78,789		
Progressive Conservative hold		Swing		+2.34
Source: Elections Canada

=== 1979 ===
1979 Canadian federal election
Party	Candidate	Votes	%	±%
Progressive Conservative	John William Thomson	37,900	66.54	–1.62
Liberal	Jim Palmer	14,839	26.05	+2.88
New Democratic	Cathie McCreary	3,584	6.29	+0.45
Social Credit	Raymond Hurst	460	0.81	–1.03
Libertarian	Luc C. Comtois	174	0.31	–
Total valid votes		56,957	99.80	
Total rejected ballots		117	0.20	–0.09
Turnout		57,074	74.94	+4.21
Eligible voters		76,158		
Progressive Conservative hold		Swing		–2.25
Source: Elections Canada

=== 1974 ===
Location of Calgary South within Calgary between the 1966 and 1976 representation orders

1974 Canadian federal election
Party	Candidate	Votes	%	±%
Progressive Conservative	Peter Bawden	41,530	68.16	+10.04
Liberal	Don Green	14,116	23.17	–7.51
New Democratic	Bohdan Harasymiw	3,558	5.84	–3.12
Social Credit	Ralph Wilson Cameron	1,120	1.84	–0.21
Independent	Stephen E. Browning	607	1.00	–
Total valid votes		60,931	99.71	
Total rejected ballots		177	0.29	–2.74
Turnout		61,108	70.73	–8.47
Eligible voters		86,392		
Progressive Conservative hold		Swing		+8.78
Source: Library of Parliament

=== 1972 ===
1972 Canadian federal election
Party	Candidate	Votes	%	±%
Progressive Conservative	Peter Bawden	34,925	58.12	+12.25
Liberal	Pat Mahoney	18,437	30.68	–16.94
New Democratic	Joseph Yanchula	5,386	8.96	+2.45
Social Credit	Ralph Wilson Cameron	1,233	2.05	–
Independent	E. John Mason	110	0.18	–
Total valid votes		60,091	96.97	
Total rejected ballots		1,875	3.03	+2.46
Turnout		61,966	79.20	+3.26
Eligible voters		78,236		
Progressive Conservative gain from Liberal		Swing		+14.60
Source: Library of Parliament

=== 1968 ===
1968 Canadian federal election
Party	Candidate	Votes	%	±%
Liberal	Pat Mahoney	20,472	47.62	+8.76
Progressive Conservative	Harold Raymond Ballard	19,716	45.87	+6.79
New Democratic	Jack D. Peters	2,798	6.51	–0.45
Total valid votes		42,986	99.43	
Total rejected ballots		247	0.57	–0.30
Turnout		43,233	75.94	+4.40
Eligible voters		56,934		
Liberal gain from Progressive Conservative		Swing		+7.78
Source: Library of Parliament

=== 1965 ===
Location of Calgary South within Calgary between the 1952 and 1966 representation orders

1965 Canadian federal election
Party	Candidate	Votes	%	±%
Progressive Conservative	Harold Raymond Ballard	20,640	39.08	+2.41
Liberal	Harry Hays	20,525	38.86	–1.26
Social Credit	E. Leonard Pearson	7,970	15.09	–1.15
New Democratic	David Gravells	3,678	6.96	–0.02
Total valid votes		52,813	99.13	
Total rejected ballots		461	0.87	+0.35
Turnout		53,274	71.54	–6.07
Eligible voters		74,469		
Progressive Conservative gain from Liberal		Swing		+1.84
Source: Library of Parliament

=== 1963 ===
1963 Canadian federal election
Party	Candidate	Votes	%	±%
Liberal	Harry Hays	21,619	40.12	+12.94
Progressive Conservative	Jack Leslie	19,760	36.67	–9.76
Social Credit	Glen Cumming	8,753	16.24	–2.41
New Democratic	F. William Hanley	3,760	6.98	–0.76
Total valid votes		53,892	99.48	
Total rejected ballots		282	0.52	–0.34
Turnout		54,174	77.61	+6.00
Eligible voters		69,807		
Liberal gain from Progressive Conservative		Swing		+11.35
Source: Library of Parliament

=== 1962 ===
1962 Canadian federal election
Party	Candidate	Votes	%	±%
Progressive Conservative	Arthur Ryan Smith	21,927	46.43	–24.07
Liberal	Frank S. Morley	12,837	27.18	+10.35
Social Credit	Bob Woodman	8,806	18.65	+9.36
New Democratic	F. William Hanley	3,654	7.74	+4.35
Total valid votes		47,224	99.14	
Total rejected ballots		412	0.86	–0.06
Turnout		47,636	71.61	–2.07
Eligible voters		66,524		
Progressive Conservative hold		Swing		–17.21
Source: Library of Parliament

=== 1958 ===
1958 Canadian federal election
Party	Candidate	Votes	%	±%
Progressive Conservative	Arthur Ryan Smith	29,482	70.50	+17.08
Liberal	Mel Shannon	7,039	16.83	–12.58
Social Credit	Frank Brown	3,884	9.29	–5.26
Co-operative Commonwealth	Herbert James Ryan	1,416	3.39	+0.77
Total valid votes		41,821	99.08	
Total rejected ballots		389	0.92	–0.38
Turnout		42,210	73.68	+1.11
Eligible voters		57,290		
Progressive Conservative hold		Swing		+14.83
Source: Library of Parliament

=== 1957 ===
1957 Canadian federal election
Party	Candidate	Votes	%	±%
Progressive Conservative	Arthur Ryan Smith	21,065	53.42	+11.57
Liberal	Donald Hugh Mackay	11,599	29.41	+0.30
Social Credit	Clifford Menzies Willmott	5,738	14.55	–8.33
Co-operative Commonwealth	Herbert James Ryan	1,033	2.62	–2.41
Total valid votes		39,435	98.70	
Total rejected ballots		519	1.30	+0.14
Turnout		39,954	72.57	+10.68
Eligible voters		55,054		
Progressive Conservative hold		Swing		+5.94
Source: Library of Parliament

=== 1953 ===
1953 Canadian federal election
Party	Candidate	Votes	%	±%
Progressive Conservative	Carl Nickle	12,491	41.85	–
Liberal	Edward Joseph McCormick	8,689	29.11	–
Social Credit	Tom Glen	6,829	22.88	–
Co-operative Commonwealth	George Edwin Ellinson	1,501	5.03	–
Labor–Progressive	Josephine Longridge	339	1.14	–
Total valid votes		29,849	98.84	
Total rejected ballots		349	1.16	–
Turnout		30,198	61.89	–
Eligible voters		48,790		
Progressive Conservative notional gain		Swing		N/A
Source: Library of Parliament

== See also ==
- Calgary South (provincial electoral district)
- List of Canadian electoral districts
- Historical federal electoral districts of Canada
