= Pat Mahoney =

Canadian politician

The Honourable Pat Mahoney PC

Member of the Canadian Parliament for Calgary South
- In office 1968–1972
- Preceded by: Harold Raymond Ballard
- Succeeded by: Peter Bawden

Personal details
- Born: Patrick Morgan Mahoney; January 20, 1929 Winnipeg, Manitoba, Canada
- Died: June 8, 2012 (aged 83) North Vancouver, British Columbia, Canada
- Party: Liberal

Patrick Morgan (Pat) Mahoney, PC (January 20, 1929 – June 8, 2012) was a Canadian judge, politician, lawyer and businessman.

Mahoney was first elected to parliament in the 1968 election as the Liberal Member of Parliament for Calgary South. A Liberal in a province and city not known for electing Liberal politicians, Mahoney rode the wave of Trudeaumania to defeat Progressive Conservative incumbent Harold Raymond Ballard by 756 votes.

In 1970, he became parliamentary secretary to the Minister of Finance. He held that position until January 1972, when Prime Minister Pierre Trudeau promoted him to Cabinet as a minister of state.

Mahoney's promotion was not enough for him to save his seat in the subsequent 1972 election, and he went down to defeat at the hands of Tory rival Peter Bawden, losing by more than 16,000 votes. In 2011, Mahoney joked that the Liberals "will elect an MP in Calgary again before the Maple Leafs win the Stanley Cup."

Subsequent to his defeat, Mahoney, a lawyer by training, was appointed to the Federal Court of Appeal.

Mahoney joined the Calgary Stampeders of the Canadian Football League as an executive in 1955 and, in 1959, moved the Labour Day Classic match against the rival Edmonton Eskimos from Edmonton to Calgary, it has been played there ever since. He briefly served as the team's general manager in 1965 and also served as president of the league's Western Football Conference.

He retired to North Vancouver, British Columbia, where he died at the age of 83.

Mahoney was the last Liberal to be elected to the House of Commons of Canada from a Calgary-based riding until Kent Hehr and Darshan Kang were elected in 2015.
