= Ron Allbright =

Canadian football player

- Allbright in McMahon Stadium in 2014 being inducted into the hall of fame

No. 64
- Positions: Guard, offensive tackle, defensive end, linebacker

Personal information
- Born: September 28, 1934; Calgary, Alberta
- Died: July 9, 2016 (aged 81); Calgary, Alberta
- Listed height: 6 ft 0 in (1.83 m)
- Listed weight: 220 lb (100 kg)

Career information
- High school: Western Canada High School
- Jr.: Calgary Bronks

Career history
- 1956–1967: Calgary Stampeders

Ronald Philip Allbright (September 28, 1934 – July 9, 2016) was a player in the Canadian Football League for the Calgary Stampeders from 1956 to 1967. He primarily played at the offensive guard and offensive tackle positions, although he also played as a defensive end and linebacker.

After playing junior football for the Calgary Bronks, Ron Allbright joined the Calgary Stampeders in 1956 and played his entire career with them until 1967. In 12 years, Allbright played in all regular season games 10 times, missing 2 in 1956 and 1961 and recovered 8 fumbles. He was part of a unit that led the league in scoring in 1963, 1964, 1965, and 1967. For his achievements, he was named to the Stampeders' McMahon Stadium Wall of Honor in 2014. He led the franchise in all-time games played upon his retirement in 1967. His 188 contests played remained the team record until 1972 when he was passed by longtime teammate Larry Robinson. Additionally, he played 26 playoff games. Allbright attended Western Canada High School and university of Alberta. He died on July 9, 2016, in Calgary.
