= John William Thomson =

Canadian politician (1928–2025)

Member of the Canadian Parliament for Calgary South
- In office 22 May 1979 – 9 July 1984
- Preceded by: Peter Bawden
- Succeeded by: Bobbie Sparrow

Personal details
- Born: 28 December 1928 Toronto, Ontario, Canada
- Died: 9 January 2025 (aged 96)
- Party: Progressive Conservative Party of Canada

John William Thomson (28 December 1928 – 9 January 2025) was a Canadian politician who was a Progressive Conservative member of the House of Commons of Canada. He was a businessman by career.

Thomson represented the Alberta riding of Calgary South, where he won election in 1979 and 1980. After serving two terms in the 31st and 32nd Canadian Parliaments, Thomson did not campaign for re-election in 1984 and left national politics.

Before he was elected at Calgary South, Thomson unsuccessfully challenged Liberal MP Alastair Gillespie at Etobicoke in the 1974 federal election.
