= Hays Converter =

Breed of cattle

The Hays Converter is a breed of cattle native specifically to Alberta, Canada. Named for Harry Hays, the agriculturalist and politician who developed the breed, it was the first pure breed of cattle created in Canada. Work on breeding the Hays Converter began in 1959, and it was officially recognized by the Canadian beef industry under the Canada Livestock Pedigree Act in December 1975. Senator Hays wished to create a cattle breed that would be based solely on production, and as such would mature to market weight as fast as possible.

== Characteristics ==
The Hays Converter is a hardy beef cattle breed, meant to stand up to the harsh conditions in Alberta. They are equipped with strong legs and good feet, giving this breed increased hardiness. By appearance, they are generally black with some white markings on the face, legs and underbelly. They can also be red and white in colour, but this is a more rare occurrence. Cows typically weigh 1250 to 1500 pounds while bulls can reach a weight of 2300 to 2800 pounds.

Hays Converters are an early maturing breed, this feature allows them to breed and produce offspring sooner than other breeds of cattle.

Hays chose three particular breeds of cattle in order to achieve the optimal breed of cattle. He achieved this by combination crosses of Holstein cattle on Hereford cattle and Brown Swiss cattle. These three existing breeds were chosen specifically for certain traits they carried. The Holstein cattle were chosen due to their good strong feet and ability to produce milk with a high butter-fat content, allowing calves to grow faster. The Hereford cattle were chosen due to their high fleshing rate, meaning that their ability to mature quickly would also be passed onto their offspring. Lastly, the Brown Swiss cattle were chosen due to their perfectly shaped udder and ability to produce milk up until the end of lactation.

Once the crosses began, Hays selected for the traits he wanted, and any offspring that did not make the cut in one way or another would have their tails docked and were shipped off to a processing plant. Once all desired traits were achieved in the offspring, the breed was closed off to mating with any outside breeds. By the time the breed achieved pedigree status in 1975, it had achieved all of the traits Hays had hoped it would. These traits included high growth rate, sturdy build, good carcass quality, easy calving and excellent milk production.
