= Aristide Blais =

Canadian politician

The Honourable Aristide Blais FRCS
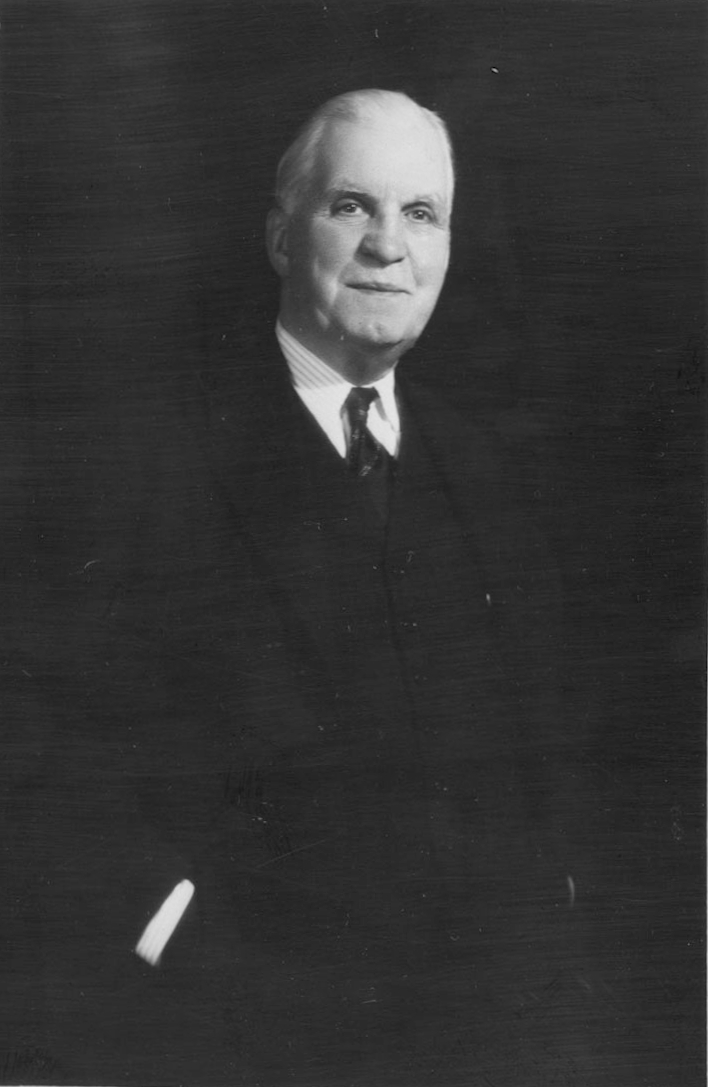

Canadian Senator from Alberta
- In office January 29, 1940 – November 10, 1964
- Appointed by: William Lyon Mackenzie King

Personal details
- Born: October 18, 1875 Berthier, Quebec, Canada
- Died: November 10, 1964 (aged 89) Vancouver, British Columbia, Canada
- Party: Liberal
- Children: 2
- Education: Université Laval (BSc, MD)
- Occupation: Physician; surgeon; politician

Military service
- Allegiance: Canada
- Rank: Lieutenant-Colonel
- Unit: Canadian Army Medical Corps

Aristide Blais FRCS (October 18, 1875 – November 10, 1964) was a Canadian physician and politician.

== Early life ==
Blais was born on October 18, 1875, in Berthier, Quebec, to Narcisse Blais and Philomène Buteau. He attended Laval University earning a Bachelor of Science and medical degree in 1899. Blais did two years of post-graduate medical studies in Paris. He married Antoinette Bolduc on April 9, 1903, and they had one daughter together. He later married Marie Moriarty and they also had one daughter together. Early in his medical career, Blais partnered with French-Canadian physician and Senator Philippe Roy in practice.

During the World War I Blais served as a captain in the Canadian Army Medical Corps, later promoted to lieutenant-colonel, and was appointed in charge of the No. 6 Casualty Clearing Hospital in Saint-Cloud, France. During his time he also served with the 38th Battalion and the 11th Field Ambulance Corps.

== Political life ==
Blais was summoned to the Canadian Senate in 1940 by Prime Minister Mackenzie King. A Liberal, he represented the senatorial division of St. Albert, Alberta. Blais publicly noted his appointment to the Senate was a tribute to French Canadians in Alberta, and a fulfillment of former Prime Minister Wilfrid Laurier's promise upon Alberta entering Confederation in 1905, that French Canadians in the province would always have a Senate representative.

Blais served until his death on November 10, 1964, at 89 years of age, at Shaughnessy Military Hospital in Vancouver, British Columbia.

== See also ==
- List of Alberta senators

Parliament of Canada
Preceded by Patrick Burns	Senator Alberta; 1940-1964	Succeeded by Harry Hays; Earl Hastings
