= Douglas Cunnington =

Canadian politician

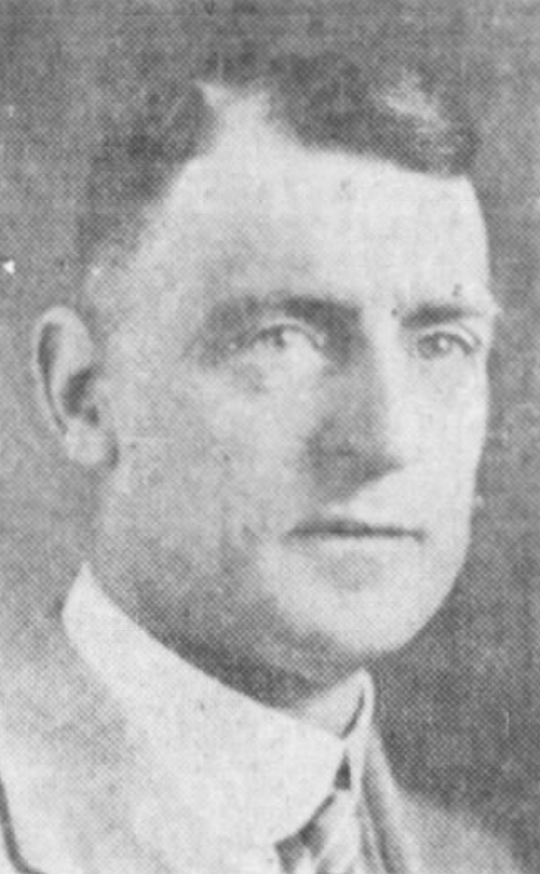

Member of Parliament for Calgary West
- In office 1939–1940
- Preceded by: R. B. Bennett
- Succeeded by: Manley Justin Edwards

Personal details
- Born: April 20, 1885 Bridgnorth, Shropshire, England
- Died: May 9, 1973 (aged 88) Calgary, Alberta, Canada
- Party: Conservative Party of Canada
- Profession: farmer

Colonel Douglas George Leopold Cunnington (April 20, 1885 – May 9, 1973) was a farmer, advertising agent, insurance salesman, military officer in the Canadian Army and a politician at the federal and municipal levels in Canada.

== Early life ==
Cunnington for a time lived in British Guiana, he moved to Canada in 1910 settling in British Columbia, a year later he moved east to the Calgary region and set up a dairy farm.

== Military career ==
Cunnington joined the Canadian Forces in 1915 during World War I. He rose through the ranks to become a Colonel. He was shot and believed killed in action at the Battle of Amiens. He was instead wounded and taken prisoner, and his wounds, treated by German medical staff, did not take him. He remained a Prisoner of War until the cessation of hostilities. (In a curious incident that received attention in the press, the German troops who took him prisoner left behind some of his effects. Some Canadian troops found them, and identified them as his. Presuming the colonel to be dead, the soldier interred the items under a marker inscribed with his name. A photograph taken of the grave was forwarded to Cunnington's wife. Thus, the Cunnington family possessed a photograph of a grave with Cunnington's name on it several decades before his actual death.)

After being released from the German POW camp in 1919, Cunnington got a job as an advertising agent with the Calgary Herald. He left that position in 1926 to establish an insurance business.

== Political career ==
Cunnington was elected to Calgary City Council for the first time in 1935 he served as an alderman until 1939 when he made the jump to federal politics.

Cunnington ran for the House of Commons of Canada in the Calgary West electoral district in a by-election held on January 28, 1939 to replace former Prime Minister Richard Bennett as the representative for that district. Cunnington won by acclamation as the Liberal candidate withdrew. After his acclamation win, Cunnington moved his family to Ottawa, Ontario. He took his seat in the House of Commons of Canada on January 25, 1940, the same day that Parliament was dissolved.

Cunnington returned to Calgary to contest the 1940 election. He was defeated by Manley Edwards, a Liberal candidate. In that election Cunnington ran under the National Government banner. He did not run again in a federal election.
