= Ross Alger =

Canadian politician (1920–1992)

Ross Patterson Alger

31st Mayor of Calgary
- In office October 31, 1977 – October 27, 1980
- Preceded by: Rod Sykes
- Succeeded by: Ralph Klein

Personal details
- Born: August 20, 1920 Prelate, Saskatchewan
- Died: January 16, 1992 (aged 71) Calgary, Alberta
- Spouse: Lois
- Children: two daughters, one son
- Profession: chartered accountant

Ross Patterson Alger (August 20, 1920 – January 16, 1992) was a politician in the Canadian province of Alberta, who served as the 31st mayor of Calgary from 1977 to 1980.

Born in Prelate, Saskatchewan, he moved to Alberta with his family in 1930s. He received a bachelor of commerce degree from the University of Alberta in 1942. He served with the Royal Canadian Air Force during World War II. After the war, he received an MBA from the University of Toronto. He settled in Calgary and started a career in accounting.

In 1958, he was a public school board trustee, and later became the chairman. From 1971 to 1974, he was an alderman on Calgary City Council. In 1974, he ran for mayor losing to Rod Sykes. He was elected mayor in 1977 and served one term until 1980. During Alger's term, notable accomplishments include the construction of the Ctrain’s first leg, the bid for the XV Olympic Winter Games, and planning for the Olympic coliseum. His brother was Harry Alger. Alger died of cancer in 1992, which had first been diagnosed in 1985.
