= James Cameron Watson =

Canadian politician

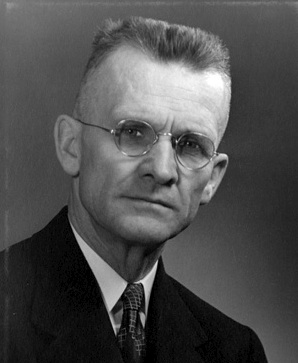

Mayor of Calgary
- In office January 1, 1946 – December 31, 1949
- Preceded by: Andrew Davison
- Succeeded by: Donald Hugh Mackay

Personal details
- Born: October 21, 1890 Lexington, Kentucky, U.S.
- Died: November 1, 1986 (aged 96) Lethbridge, Alberta, Canada
- Occupation: electrician

James Cameron Watson (October 21, 1890 – November 1, 1986) was a Canadian politician, electrician and 25th Mayor of Calgary.

== Early life ==
Watson was born October 21, 1890, in Lexington, Kentucky, to British parents. He was educated in Boston, New York and Halifax and became a telephone journeyman electrician. Watson moved to Alberta to work in a coal mine, however a serious injury forced him back into the telephone industry. Watson was employed by Bell Telephone and later, Alberta Government Telephones, where he became a member of the Brotherhood of Electric Workers, and eventually chairman of the Calgary Labor Council.

== Military service ==
In 1916, at the age of 25, Watson enlisted in the First World War with the 56th Battalion, and later, the 50th Battalion as a Lewis gunner where he participated in the Battle of Vimy Ridge in April 1917. Watson was transferred to the Signal Corps where he continued to see combat on the Western front at The Somme, Paschendale, Amiens and at Cambrai, where he was wounded in both legs.

== Political life ==
Owing to his profile in the labour community, Watson was first elected to Calgary City Council in 1943 as an Alderman, and served through to 1945. Friends convinced Watson to contest the 1945 election, and he agreed to run conceding that he would most likely lose. To his surprise, Watson won the election and became the 25th Mayor of Calgary in 1945, and held that office for until he was defeated by Donald Hugh Mackay in the 1950 municipal election. Watson was known for the purchase of Coste House which became the Allied Arts Centre, a space for artists and artisans. Watson was the deciding vote on the decision not to relocate the Calgary General Hospital to downtown, and instead the investment was used to expand the hospital. As well, during Watson's term, the City first installed parking meters.

== Later life ==
Watson retired from public life and remained active in the labour movement in Calgary, and later moved to Lethbridge, where he died on November 1, 1986.

Preceded by Andrew Davison	Mayor of Calgary; 1946–1949	Succeeded by Donald Hugh Mackay
