= Harold Raymond Ballard =

Canadian politician

- Official 1966 portrait

Member of Parliament for Calgary South
- In office 8 November 1965 – 24 June 1968
- Preceded by: Harry Hays
- Succeeded by: Pat Mahoney

Alderman Calgary City Council Ward 1
- In office 22 October 1962 – 24 October 1966

Personal details
- Born: February 5, 1918 Provost, Alberta, Canada
- Died: January 31, 1997 (aged 78) Calgary, Alberta, Canada
- Education: University of British Columbia

Harold Raymond Ballard (February 5, 1918 – January 31, 1997) was a business executive, chartered accountant and Canadian politician. He served as a Member of Parliament from 1965 to 1968 and alderman on Calgary City Council from 1962 to 1966.

Ballard was born at Provost, Alberta to William Ballard and Mable Armstrong on February 5, 1918. In the late 1930s, he served as Town Clerk in Lloydminster. In 1940, he joined the Royal Canadian Air Force. Following the Second World War, he attended the University of British Columbia, where he received bachelor's degrees in arts and commerce. Ballard became a partner in the accounting firm of Ballard, Burns and Company.

Under the sponsorship of the North Hill Business Association, he was elected to City Council in 1962 and served through to 1966. Ballard was also active with the Calgary Winter Club and the Kiwanis Club of North Calgary.

Ballard first ran for a seat in the House of Commons of Canada in the 1965 federal election as a Progressive Conservative. He defeated the incumbent Liberal Member of Parliament Harry Hays, a former mayor of Calgary and council colleague of his, at Calgary South. He served in the Opposition caucus under leaders John Diefenbaker, Michael Starr, and Robert Stanfield in the 27th Canadian Parliament. Ballard ran for re-election in 1968 but lost to Liberal candidate Patrick Mahoney.

Parliament of Canada
Preceded by Harry Hays	Member of Parliament Calgary South; 1965–1968	Succeeded by Pat Mahoney
