= Manley Justin Edwards =

Canadian politician

Member of Parliament for Calgary West
- In office 1940–1945
- Preceded by: Douglas Cunnington
- Succeeded by: Arthur LeRoy Smith

Personal details
- Born: February 18, 1892 Caistorville, Ontario
- Died: May 8, 1962 (aged 70) Calgary, Alberta
- Party: Liberal
- Profession: teacher, lawyer

Manley Justin Edwards (February 18, 1892 – May 8, 1962) was a barrister, teacher and Canadian federal politician.

Edwards ran as a Liberal candidate in the 1940 Canadian federal election. He defeated Douglas Cunnington, the Conservative Member of Parliament for Calgary West, in a hotly contested race. Edwards and George Henry Ross, who was elected in the same Liberal landslide victory, became the first two Liberal MPs to represent Calgary ridings. He served one term in office before retiring in 1945.
