= Rod Sykes =

Canadian politician (1929–2025)

30th Mayor of Calgary
- In office October 22, 1969 – October 31, 1977
- Preceded by: Jack Leslie
- Succeeded by: Ross Alger

Personal details
- Born: James Rodney Winter Sykes; May 19, 1929 Montreal, Quebec, Canada
- Died: January 3, 2025 (aged 95) Calgary, Alberta, Canada
- Occupation: Accountant; politician

James Rodney Winter Sykes (May 19, 1929 – January 3, 2025) was a Canadian politician from Alberta. He served as the 30th Mayor of Calgary from 1969 to 1977 and as leader of the Alberta Social Credit Party from 1980 to 1982. He ran as a Liberal candidate in the 1984 federal election.

== Early life ==
Sykes was born in May 19, 1929 in Montreal, Quebec, to Leslie Sykes an electrical engineer, and Muriel, a stay-at-home mother. The Sykes family moved shortly after his birth to Sooke, British Columbia. Sykes's father was largely absent from the home, working out of the community, and Sykes did not attend a formal school until the age of 8 in 1937 when the family moved to Kent. Instead Sykes learned to read and write from his mother. The Sykes family returned to Victoria, British Columbia a year later after the death of his grandfather James Sykes to live in his inherited home.

After returning to Victoria, Sykes's father enlisted in the Canadian Scottish Reserves and served overseas for six years in the Second World War. The family faced financial insecurity, and his mother spent time in a nursing home due to mental health issues, while Sykes and his sister were put into foster care. Sykes lashed out during his time at school and was often in trouble. Sykes later attended Oak Bay High School, which he saw as a turning point in his life, and was able to catch up with his education in what he described as a positive environment. Sykes also credited T.W.S. Parsons, the Commissioner of the British Columbia Provincial Police, and father of a school friend with being a positive father figure in his formative years.

Sykes's father returned from the Second World War when his son was 17, and Rod soon moved out of the family home due to animosity with his father. Sykes considered a career in law, but attended Sprott Shaw College to take classes in business, and began working in an apprenticeship at a small accounting firm. At 19, Sykes reported the principal of the firm to the Institute of Chartered Accountants after he was forced to present falsified figures for a client to a bank, the Institute arranged for Sykes to continue his career at Price Waterhouse. With Price Waterhouse, Sykes lived in Montreal for eight years from 1954 to 1962, and in Zurich, Switzerland for a short period of time.

After becoming a Chartered accountant, Sykes attended Sir George Williams University in Montreal, studying economics.

== Canadian Pacific Railway and Calgary ==
Sykes joined Canadian Pacific Railway as the Supervisor of Economic Projects in 1959 at the invitation of Ian David Sinclair. His role was to better utilize the CPR's non-transportation assets such as oil, gas, forestry, real estate, chemicals and metal holdings. Sykes spent much of his time travelling between his home in Montreal and Calgary, where the CPR was considering moving tracks out of the city's downtown and use the land for real estate development. Sykes moved to Calgary in 1962 as the CPR's Project Manager for the Calgary land use study.

In Calgary, Sykes established and ran the CPR's real estate arm Marathon Realty, which Sykes named after the short story The Loneliness of the Long-Distance Runner. The planned relocation of the CPR tracks was a joint project between the city and the railway, and early on Sykes had a strong relationship with Mayor Harry Hays. When Hays quit municipal politics to run federally in 1963, he was replaced with Grant MacEwan for two years, with whom Sykes had a challenging relationship. While Hays had strongly supported the redevelopment, MacEwan believed the final decision should be sent to the residents of Calgary.

== Political career ==
Sykes served as mayor of Calgary from 1969 to 1977. He was defender of the underdog and the importance of financial safety nets for the needy, attacked corruption among the rich and powerful, and left office after ensuring Calgary would begin on LRT construction. During his time as mayor, Calgary switched from the pro-rep (STV) system to plurality election in single-member wards.

Sykes was leader of the Alberta Social Credit Party from 1980 to 1982. He quit as party leader in 1982, frustrated by the party's internal and financial problems.

In 1984, he was nominated by Alan Clarke, Calgary East Federal Liberal Riding Association Vice President, to run for the Liberal Party for a seat in the House of Commons, in the riding of Calgary East. At the time this was the largest riding in Canada.

Sykes was acclaimed at a nomination meeting with over six hundred members in attendance. Despite being the only Liberal candidate endorsed by the Calgary Sun that year, he lost to Progressive Conservative Alex Kindy in the general election.

== Personal life and death ==
Sykes and his wife, Marie Therese Claire Gisèle (née Seguin, 1929–2008), had five children, fourteen grandchildren and three great-grandchildren.

At an early age Sykes took an interest in gardening, reading, and stamp collecting, and remained a member of the American Philatelic Society throughout his life. Through his interest in reading, the British Royal family, and political history, Sykes became friends with Lord Mountbatten, which allowed Sykes access to some major events during his life.

Sykes was raised as a Christian in the Church of England, but later converted to Catholicism in his mid-20s.

Sykes was a long-time friend of professional wrestler and promoter Stu Hart.

Sykes died at his home in Calgary, on January 3, 2025, at the age of 95.

Political offices
Preceded by Jack Leslie	Mayor of Calgary; 1969–1977	Succeeded by Ross Alger
Party political offices
Preceded by Robert Curtis Clark	Social Credit Party of Alberta Leader; 1980–1982	Succeeded by Martin Hattersley
