= Arthur Ryan Smith =

Canadian politician

Member of Parliament for Calgary South
- In office 1957–1963
- Preceded by: Carl Olof Nickle
- Succeeded by: Harry Hays

Personal details
- Born: May 16, 1919 Calgary, Alberta, Canada
- Died: June 30, 2008 (aged 89) Calgary, Alberta, Canada
- Party: Progressive Conservative
- Parent: Arthur LeRoy Smith (father)
- Profession: Businessman

Captain Arthur Ryan Smith Jr. OC AOE DFC (May 16, 1919 – June 30, 2008) was a Canadian oilfield worker, bomber pilot, executive business man, philanthropist, magazine editor, advertising executive and politician on the municipal, provincial and federal levels of government.

== Early life ==
Arthur Ryan Smith was born in Calgary, Alberta, on May 16, 1919, to Arthur LeRoy Smith, Member of Parliament for Calgary West from 1945 to 1951, and Sara Isobel Ryan. He grew up in Calgary and in British Columbia. He got his first job as an oil field worker at the age of 16 in Turner Valley, Alberta, and spent four years working in the oil patch.

At the outbreak of World War II Smith enlisted in the Royal Canadian Air Force and became a pilot. He flew 34 combat missions on Lancaster bombers and was awarded the Distinguished Flying Cross. When Smith returned home from the war he went back to work in the oil patch. He worked his way up from roughneck to Assistant of the President at the Anglo-American Oil Company. In 1952 he became editor for the publication Petroleum Exploration Digest.

Smith and Ron Butlin co-hosted a weekly sports radio show during the 1950s on CFAC.

== Municipal politics ==
Smith was elected to Calgary city council in 1953 and served there until 1955 when he decided to run for a seat in the provincial legislature.

Smith returned to city council after retiring from federal politics in 1963. He was elected in 1965 and remained in office until 1967.

== Provincial politics ==
Smith ran as a candidate in the Calgary provincial electoral district in the 1955 Alberta general election. He finished first in the vote counts on the first ballot. He resigned in 1957 to run for Parliament.

== Federal politics ==
Smith ran in the district of Calgary South in the 1957 federal election. He won by 10,000 votes over Donald McKay. In the election the following year, he won by 23,000 votes over the nearest candidate. In the 1962 federal election. His margin of victory was significantly reduced, but he still won in a landslide. Smith retired from federal politics in 1963 at the dissolution of the house. During his time as a Member of Parliament, he served as a delegate to the United Nations.

== Late life ==
Smith became an influential business man after his career in public office. In 1961 he and Milt Harradence used their political influence with Prime John Diefenbaker to make Lynn Garrison's Lancaster Memorial Fund a success. This saw Lancaster FM-136, purchased from Crown Assets Disposal Corporation by Lynn Garrison, displayed at McCall Field, Calgary as a memorial to those who had trained under the British Commonwealth Air Training Plan. Smith had won his Distinguished Flying Cross while flying Lancasters during World War II. He served as an executive on numerous companies, sat on public boards, and volunteered in youth sports programs. In 1988 he was appointed Chief of Protocol for the 1988 Winter Olympic Games in Calgary. In 1998, Smith founded the Calgary Homeless Foundation, a registered charity committed to end homelessness in Calgary.

In 2006 he endorsed Mark Norris for the leadership of the Alberta Progressive Conservative Party.

== Awards ==
Smith became a member of the Order of Canada in 1988 and an officer in 2003. That same year he was also given an honorary doctor of laws degree from the University of Calgary. He was awarded the Alberta Order of Excellence and in 1997 he became Honorary Colonel of the 416 Tactical Fighter Squadron.

Legislative Assembly of Alberta
| Preceded by Paul Brecken; Howard MacDonald | MLA Calgary; 1955–1957 | Succeeded by Ernest Watkins |
Parliament of Canada
| Preceded by Carl Olof Nickle | Member of Parliament Calgary South; 1957–1963 | Succeeded by Harry Hays |
