= Haysboro, Calgary =

Haysboro
- Neighbourhood
- Location of Haysboro in Calgary
- Coordinates: 50°58′13″N 114°05′05″W
- Country: Canada
- Province: Alberta
- City: Calgary
- Quadrant: SW
- Ward: 11
- Established: 1958
- Annexed: 1956
- Named for: Harry Hays

Government
  - Mayor: Jeromy Farkas
  - Administrative body: Calgary City Council
  - Councillor: Rob Ward (Communities First)

Area
  - Total: 2.9 km^{2} (1.1 sq mi)
- Elevation: 1,060 m (3,480 ft)

Population (2006)
  - Total: 5,970
  - Average Income: $52,261
- Website: Haysboro Community Association

Haysboro is a residential neighbourhood in the southwest quadrant of Calgary, Alberta. It is bounded by Heritage Drive to the north, Macleod Trail to the east, 98th Avenue (an alley north of Southland Drive) to the south and 14 Street W and the Glenmore Reservoir to the west. It is bisected by Elbow Drive.

The land comprising Haysboro was annexed by the City of Calgary in 1956 and the community was established in 1958. The land comprising the neighbourhood was originally a dairy farm owned by future Calgary Mayor, Member of Parliament and Senator Harry Hays, who would sell the land in 1959 to developers in part to fund his campaign for mayor. Haysboro is represented on Calgary City Council by the councillor for Ward 11.

== Demographics ==
In the City of Calgary's 2021 municipal census, Haysboro had a population of 6,960 living in 3,440 dwellings. With a land area of 2.7 km^{2} (1.0 sq mi), it had a population density of 2,580/km^{2} (6,680/sq mi) in 2021.

Residents in this community had a median household income of $78,500 in 2021, and there were 10% low income residents living in Haysboro. As of 2021, 23% of the residents were immigrants. A proportion of 33.5% of the buildings were condominiums or apartments, and 43% of the housing was used for renting. 29% of residents spent 30%+ of their income on housing, compared to the Calgary average of 23%.

Pop. Overtime
| Year | Population |
|---|---|
| 2014 | 7240 |
| 2015 | 7255 |
| 2016 | 7086 |
| 2017 | 7076 |
| 2018 | 7166 |
| 2019 | 7080 |
| 2021 | 6960 |

== Crime ==
In the May 2023-May 2024 data period, Haysboro had a crime rate of 3.333/100, a decrease from the previous data period.

=== Crime data by year ===
Crime Data
| Year | Crime Rate (/100) |
|---|---|
| 2018 | 3.4 |
| 2019 | 4.1 |
| 2020 | 3.0 |
| 2021 | 3.1 |
| 2022 | 3.7 |
| 2023 | 3.3 |

== Education ==
The community is served by Akiva Academy, Haysboro Elementary and Woodman Junior High public schools, as well as STEM Innovation Academy and Our Lady of the Rockies High School (Catholic). Eugene Coste elementary is a Spanish immersion school

== See also ==
- List of neighbourhoods in Calgary
- Harry Hays
