= Calgary Southwest =

Former federal electoral district in Alberta, Canada

Coordinates: 50.967°N 114.100°W

Alberta electoral district
- Calgary Southwest in relation to the other Calgary ridings

Defunct federal electoral district
- Legislature: House of Commons
- District created: 1987
- District abolished: 2013
- First contested: 1988
- Last contested: 2011

Demographics
- Population (2011): 136,011
- Electors (2011): 93,707
- Area (km²): 76.70
- Census division: Division No. 6
- Census subdivision: Calgary

Calgary Southwest was a federal electoral district in Alberta, Canada, that was represented in the House of Commons of Canada from 1988 to 2015. The district was in the southwest part of the city of Calgary, south of Glenmore Trail and west of the Canadian Pacific Kansas City Railway line.

Former prime minister Stephen Harper represented the riding during his leadership.

== History ==
The electoral district was created in 1987 from parts of the Bow River, Calgary West, Calgary East, Calgary South, and a small piece of Calgary Centre ridings.

The riding was abolished during the Canadian federal electoral redistribution, 2012, 80% into Calgary Heritage and 20% into Calgary Midnapore.

=== Historical boundaries ===
1987 representation order

1996 representation order

2003 representation order

=== Members of Parliament ===
This riding has elected the following members of the House of Commons of Canada:

Parliament	Years	Member	Party
Calgary Southwest; Riding created from Bow River, Calgary Centre, Calgary East, Calgary West and Calgary South
34th	1988–1993	Bobbie Sparrow	Progressive Conservative
35th	1993–1997	Preston Manning	Reform
36th	1997–2000	Preston Manning	Reform
36th	2000–2000	Preston Manning	Alliance
37th	2000–2002	Preston Manning	Alliance
37th	2002–2003	Stephen Harper	Alliance
37th	2003–2004	Stephen Harper	Conservative
38th	2004–2006	Stephen Harper	Conservative
39th	2006–2008	Stephen Harper	Conservative
40th	2008–2011	Stephen Harper	Conservative
41st	2011–2015	Stephen Harper	Conservative
Riding dissolved into Calgary Heritage and Calgary Midnapore

=== Members of Parliament ===
All three of the riding's MPs were prominent: Bobbie Sparrow served in the cabinet led by Kim Campbell, while Preston Manning was the leader of the Reform Party of Canada from 1987 and Leader of the Opposition from 1997 to 2000. Its final MP in the Southwest configuration was Prime Minister Stephen Harper, an economist and a lecturer outside politics. He was elected to Calgary Southwest, shortly after becoming leader of the Canadian Alliance and thus leader of the Opposition, in a 2002 by-election occasioned by Manning's retirement. From 2003, Harper was the leader of the re-formed Conservative Party of Canada, and from 2006, prime minister; he ceased to be both after the 2015 Canadian federal election.

== Election results ==
2011 Canadian federal election
Party	Candidate	Votes	%	±%	Expenditures
Conservative	Stephen Harper	42,998	75.12	+2.16	$62,584.25
New Democratic	Holly Heffernan	6,823	11.92	+4.16	$1,112.70
Liberal	Marlene Lamontagne	4,121	7.20	–2.11	$14,171.18
Green	Kelly Christie	2,991	5.23	–3.75	$4,879.04
Independent	Larry R. Heather	303	0.53	+0.04	$389.23
Total valid votes/expense limit		57,236	99.69	–	$97,126.16
Total rejected ballots		177	0.31	+0.00	
Turnout		57,413	60.42	+2.03	
Eligible voters		95,026			
Conservative hold		Swing		+3.16	
Note: Larry R. Heather's vote as an independent candidate is compared to his vote as a CHP candidate in 2008.
Source: Elections Canada

2008 Canadian federal election
Party	Candidate	Votes	%	±%	Expenditures
Conservative	Stephen Harper	38,548	72.96	+0.60	$60,401.57
Liberal	Marlene Lamontagne	4,918	9.31	–2.10	$12,612.08
Green	Kelly Christie	4,743	8.98	+1.30	$1,250.00
New Democratic	Holly Heffernan	4,102	7.76	–0.30	$1,697.01
Libertarian	Dennis Young	265	0.50	–	$398.06
Christian Heritage	Larry R. Heather	256	0.48	–0.01	$1,098.06
Total valid votes/expense limit		52,832	99.69	–	$92,155.66
Total rejected ballots		164	0.31	+0.10	
Turnout		52,996	58.39	–8.18	
Eligible voters		90,756			
Conservative hold		Swing		+1.35	
Source: Elections Canada

2006 Canadian federal election
Party	Candidate	Votes	%	±%	Expenditures
Conservative	Stephen Harper	41,549	72.36	+4.00	$67,266.44
Liberal	Mike Swanson	6,553	11.41	–6.99	$15,422.51
New Democratic	Holly Heffernan	4,628	8.06	+2.47	$5,057.72
Green	Kim Warnke	4,407	7.68	+1.46	$1,112.12
Christian Heritage	Larry R. Heather	279	0.49	+0.05	$1,370.04
Total valid votes/expense limit		57,416	99.79	–	$83,940.30
Total rejected ballots		120	0.21	–0.08	
Turnout		57,536	66.57	+2.08	
Eligible voters		86,426			
Conservative hold		Swing		+5.50	
Source: Elections Canada

2004 Canadian federal election
Party	Candidate	Votes	%	±%	Expenditures
Conservative	Stephen Harper	35,297	68.36	–12.84	$58,798.56
Liberal	Avalon Roberts	9,501	18.40	+3.49	$43,846.23
Green	Darcy Kraus	3,210	6.22	–	$534.96
New Democratic	Daria Fox	2,884	5.59	+1.70	$1,848.70
Marijuana	Mark de Pelham	516	1.00	–	none listed
Christian Heritage	Larry R. Heather	229	0.44	–	$985.59
Total valid votes/expense limit		51,637	99.71	–	$78,391.49
Total rejected ballots		149	0.29	–0.24	
Turnout		51,786	64.49	+41.44	
Eligible voters		80,296			
Conservative notional hold		Swing		–8.16	
Source: Elections Canada

2000 federal election redistributed results
Party	Vote	%
Canadian Alliance	31,756	64.96
Progressive Conservative	7,936	16.23
Liberal	7,290	14.91
New Democratic	1,901	3.89

Canadian federal by-election, May 13, 2002 Resignation of Preston Manning
Party	Candidate	Votes	%	±%	Expenditures
Alliance	Stephen Harper	13,200	71.66	+55.37	$58,959.16
New Democratic	Bill Phipps	3,813	20.70	+16.73	$34,789.77
Green	James Stephen Kohut	660	3.58	–	$2,750.80
Independent	Gordon Barrett	428	2.32	–	$3,329.34
Christian Heritage	Ron Gray	320	1.74	–	$27,772.78
Total valid votes		18,421	99.47		
Total rejected ballots		98	0.53	+0.23	
Turnout		18,519	23.05	–39.88	
Eligible voters		80,360			
Alliance hold		Swing		–4.94	
Source: Elections Canada

=== 2000 ===
2000 Canadian federal election
Party	Candidate	Votes	%	±%	Expenditures
Alliance	Preston Manning	34,529	64.81	+6.82	$69,676
Progressive Conservative	Paul Monaghan	8,679	16.29	–1.61	$8,592
Liberal	Barry J. Rust	7,954	14.93	–5.24	$13,233
New Democratic	Jennifer Stewart	2,113	3.97	+1.22	$720
Total valid votes		53,275	99.70		
Total rejected ballots		158	0.30	+0.08	
Turnout		53,433	62.93	–3.85	
Eligible voters		84,905			
Alliance notional hold		Swing		+4.22	
Source: Elections Canada

1997 Canadian federal election
Party	Candidate	Votes	%	±%	Expenditures
Reform	Preston Manning	27,912	57.99	–3.23	$62,515
Liberal	Paul Drager	9,706	20.17	+3.87	$61,666
Progressive Conservative	Jan Brown	8,617	17.90	–0.69	$34,551
New Democratic	Mara Vogel	1,322	2.75	+1.13	$1,064
Green	Sol Candel	310	0.64	+0.20	none listed
Natural Law	Richard Shelford	175	0.36	–0.01	none listed
Christian Heritage	Larry R. Heather	89	0.18	–	$176
Total valid votes		48,131	99.78		
Total rejected ballots		107	0.22	+0.02	
Turnout		48,238	66.78	–4.04	
Eligible voters		72,239			
Reform hold		Swing		–3.55	
Source: Elections Canada

1993 Canadian federal election
Party	Candidate	Votes	%	±%	Expenditures
Reform	Preston Manning	41,630	61.22	+47.81	$59,445
Progressive Conservative	Bobbie Sparrow	12,642	18.59	–46.57	$61,978
Liberal	Bill Richards	11,087	16.30	+4.77	$60,511
New Democratic	Catherine Rose	1,099	1.62	–6.48	$4,791
National	Lea Russell	910	1.34	–	$2,580
Green	Sol Candel	301	0.44	–	$6,216
Natural Law	Ida Bugmann	249	0.37	–	none listed
Independent	Miel S.R. Gabriel	57	0.08	–	$218
Communist	Darrell Rankin	28	0.04	–	$1,422
Total valid votes		68,003	99.80		
Total rejected ballots		137	0.20	+0.03	
Turnout		68,140	70.82	–9.62	
Eligible voters		96,213			
Reform gain from Progressive Conservative		Swing		+47.19	
Source: Elections Canada

1988 Canadian federal election
Party	Candidate	Votes	%	±%
Progressive Conservative	Bobbie Sparrow	40,397	65.16	–
Reform	Janet Jessop	8,316	13.41	–
Liberal	Percy Baker	7,147	11.53	–
New Democratic	Vera Vogel	5,024	8.10	–
Independent	Larry R. Heather	669	1.08	–
Rhinoceros	Johnny Barretto	372	0.60	–
Confederation of Regions	Bill Sinclair	68	0.11	–
Total valid votes		61,993	99.83	
Total rejected ballots		103	0.17	–
Turnout		62,096	80.44	–
Eligible voters		77,198		
Progressive Conservative notional gain		Swing		N/A
Source: Elections Canada

== See also ==
- List of Canadian electoral districts
- Historical federal electoral districts of Canada

Parliament of Canada
Preceded by LaSalle—Émard	Constituency represented by the Prime Minister; 2006–2015	Succeeded by Papineau
