= Peter Bawden =

Canadian politician

Peter Colwell Bawden
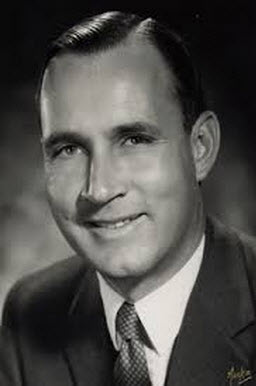

Member of the Canadian Parliament for Calgary South
- In office 1972–1979
- Preceded by: Pat Mahoney
- Succeeded by: John William Thomson

Personal details
- Born: January 1, 1929 Toronto, Ontario, Canada
- Died: February 28, 1991 (aged 62) Calgary, Alberta, Canada
- Party: Progressive Conservative
- Children: 3
- Education: Upper Canada College
- Occupation: Businessman and politician

Peter Colwell Bawden, OC (January 1, 1929 – February 28, 1991) was a prominent Canadian oilman and federal politician. He was elected to the House of Commons of Canada in 1972, representing the riding of Calgary South in the heart of Canada's oil industry. A Progressive Conservative, Bawden was re-elected in 1974 and served until 1979. He was invested as an Officer of the Order of Canada in 1990.

== Oil and gas exploration ==
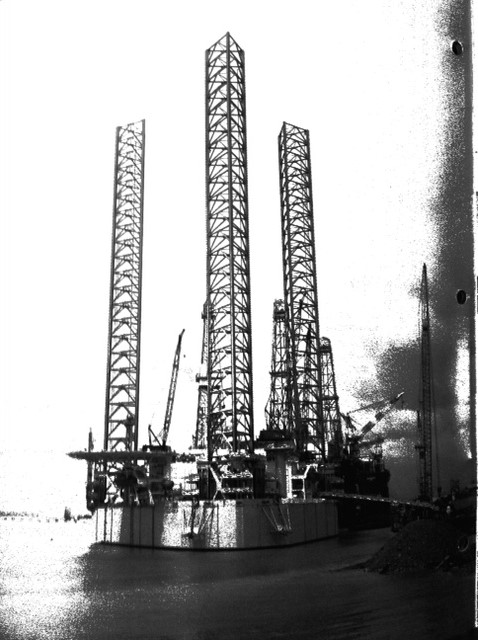
One of the first Bawden Drilling oil rigs in Calgary, Canada; circa 1955.

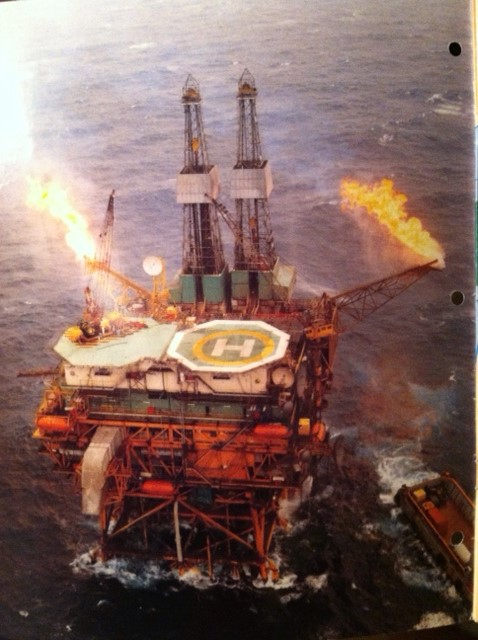
A Bawden Drilling North Sea oil rig; circa 1980.

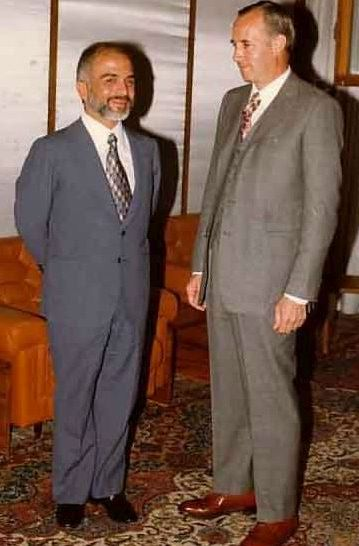
King Hussein of Jordan & Peter Bawden. King Hussein hosted Peter Bawden in 1979 as an official guest of the Country of Jordan.

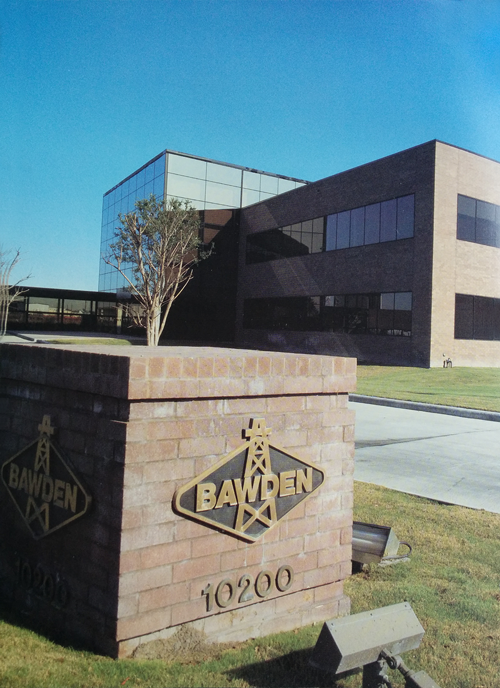
Bawden Drilling United States headquarters in Houston, Texas.

Bawden founded and built the world's largest (at the time) privately owned oil and gas drilling company. In business for over 35 years, and consisting of a large fleet of offshore and land rigs operated from offices worldwide, Bawden Drilling worked closely with Shell Oil, Mobil Corporation and Dome Petroleum, among others.

He moved to Alberta in the fall of 1950 and founded Peter Bawden Drilling in 1952 shortly after his arrival in Calgary. In 1960, at the age of 31, Peter Bawden's first drilling rig struck oil. With its acquisition of Trident Drilling, Bawden Drilling became Canada's largest drilling company. In 1968, Peter Bawden Drilling acquired Brown Drilling in California. Thereafter, as a land drilling contractor, Bawden expanded the company's on-shore operations throughout North America, from the Arctic to the Gulf of Mexico, to Norway, Algeria, Australia, New Guinea, Indonesia, Philippines, Guatemala, Venezuela, Colombia, Madagascar, and the Middle East. Eventually having operations on every continent in the world.

A notable contribution of the Bawden organization was the development of Canadian oilfield expertise and technology in many parts of the world. Bawden's first offshore assignments began in 1968 off the coast of Australia where the company operated that continent's first self-containing platform rigs. In the North Sea, Bawden Drilling became the largest development-drilling contractor in the United Kingdom. Well known for technological, industry advances, Bawden designed and built the world's largest (at that time) semi-submersible rig for Shell Oil. They also had large platform rig operations off the California coast, in the Persian Gulf and off the coast of Malaysia.

Bawden set many industry records including drilling a deviated well -11,324 feet in eighteen days from a fixed platform in the North Sea. Other notable rigs were located in the middle of the Pasadena Raceway and behind the Beverly Hills high school. He was a visionary trailblazer in his 1964 activities to promote Canada as an exporter of LNG (Liquefied Petroleum Gases). In 1977, he created Mosswood Oil & Gas expanding into oil production.

Peter Bawden committed his life to the search for oil, gas and geothermal energy. Geothermal Drilling was a Bawden specialty with over 20 years of experience in the challenging tapping of hot water and steam reservoirs. Bawden won numerous industry awards for its emphasis on safety. The company also received the Canadian Export Award in 1985 and Export Achievement Awards in the years 1981, 1983, 1984, 1985 and 1986.

== Canadian Parliament and public service ==
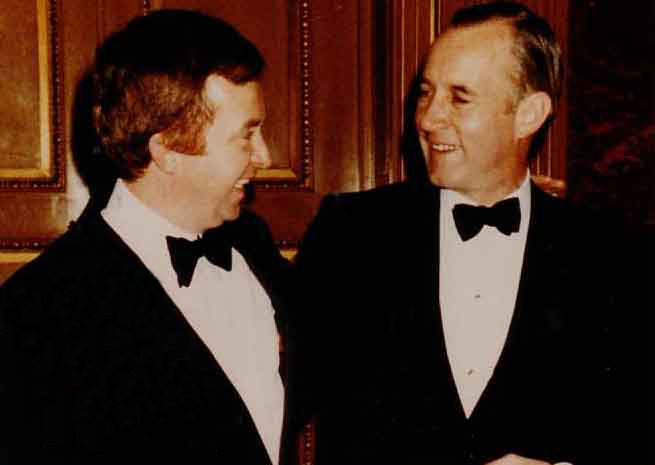
Canadian Prime Minister Joe Clark and Member of Parliament Peter Bawden (circa 1980).

Bawden was honored in 1990 as an Officer of the Order of Canada for being "largely responsible for pioneering oil and gas drilling in the Arctic Circle and for the international transfer of Canadian expertise and technology in this field". Peter Bawden was the first drilling contractor to drill in the Canadian Arctic where the harsh and remote environment demanded special logistical planning. He is recognized for the first offshore crude oil discovery in Canadian history on Sable Island earning the cover story of Mobil Corporation's magazine in 1971.

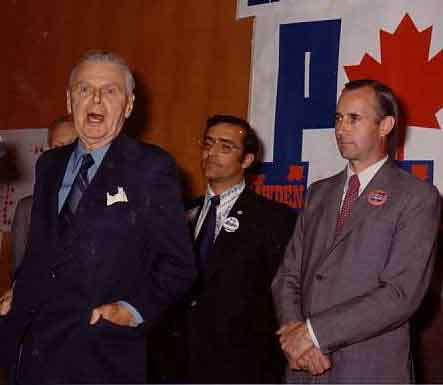
In 1972, with the strong endorsement of former Prime Minister John Diefenbaker, Peter Bawden won Calgary South, with one of the biggest landslides in the country.

Bawden had a distinguished public service career and was elected (with one of the biggest majorities in the country) as a Member of the Canadian House of Commons in 1972 and re-elected in 1974. He defeated Patrick Mahoney, a Liberal cabinet minister, in the former contest. During his years in Ottawa he served on the Commons Committee on Finance, Natural Resources, Trade and Economic Affairs, including External Affairs and National Defense. For seven years he served as a delegate to the NATO Parliamentary Assembly representing the Canadian Parliament to meet and discuss common security problems. He also served on the Canada/US Inter-parliamentary Committee.

His community service included acting as a director in the Business Council of National Issues, Calgary Special Olympics and trustee of the Canadian Olympic Association and Wycliffe College in Toronto. His membership included Canada West Foundation, Ducks Unlimited Canada, and he was an Honorary Colonel of the 14th (Calgary) Service Battalion, Honorary Vice-President of the Calgary Regional Council of the Boy Scouts of Canada and Director of the Confederation of Church and Business People, and he was the founding donor to The Calgary Foundation.

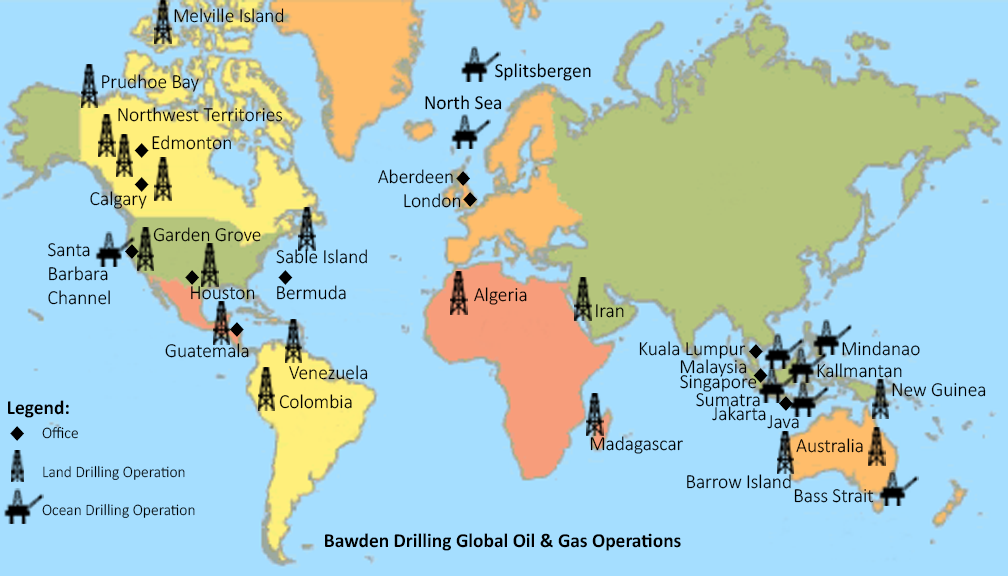
Bawden Drilling Global Oil & Gas Operations

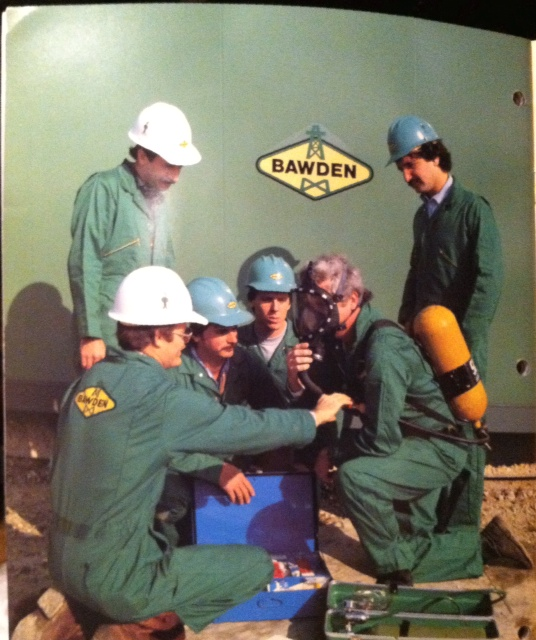
Bawden Drilling crew conducting safety training circa 1979.

== Other companies ==
Peter Bawden served as a director on several prestigious Canadian companies including Barclays Bank, Air Canada, Boeing, Safeway, Procor Limited, Jannock Ltd, Westair Resources Ltd and Mosswood Oil & Gas Ltd. He was a member of the Business Council on National Issues, the World Business Council and the Washington Quarterly Roundtable.

=== Aviation ===
A pilot at age 17, Bawden also made a substantial contribution to the aviation industry and founded in 1991, Executive Flight Centre, Canada's largest aviation service company, including a large fleet of planes and jets.

== Personal life ==
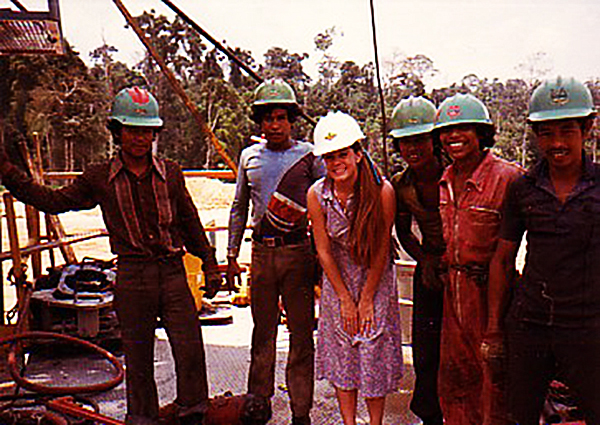
Jennifer Bawden, daughter of Peter Bawden (founder of Bawden Drilling Company), visiting one of the company's oil rigs in Jakarta, Indonesia.

=== Childhood ===
Born into the Toronto establishment, Bawden attended Upper Canada College in Toronto. His father, Harry Norman Bawden, was president, CEO and later vice-chairman of Dominion Securities, one of Canada's largest investment banks before it was acquired by the Royal Bank of Canada in 1996.

Harry Bawden was Director of the War Finance Committee, a board member of Molson's Brewery, and a board member of Dominion Foundries & Steel, among others.

=== Chuck wagon racing ===
During the late 1950s and 1960s, the Peter Bawden chuck wagon dominated the World Chuck Wagon Races at the Calgary Stampede and broke several world track records.

=== Honorary Colonel ===
Bawden served as Honorary Colonel of 14 (Calgary) Service Battalion for a number of years. The Battalion holds a number of artifacts belonging to Bawden, including one of his famous chuck wagons.

By C no==References==
