= Bobbie Sparrow =

Canadian politician (1935–2026)

The Honourable Bobbie Sparrow PC

Minister of Energy, Mines, and Resources
- In office June 25, 1993 – November 3, 1993
- Prime Minister: Kim Campbell
- Preceded by: Bill McKnight
- Succeeded by: Anne McLellan

Minister of Forestry
- In office June 25, 1993 – November 3, 1993
- Prime Minister: Kim Campbell
- Preceded by: Frank Oberle Sr.
- Succeeded by: Anne McLellan

Member of Parliament for Calgary Southwest (Calgary South; 1984–1988)
- In office September 4, 1984 – October 25, 1993
- Preceded by: John William Thomson
- Succeeded by: Preston Manning

Personal details
- Born: Barbara Jane O'Connor; July 11, 1935 Toronto, Ontario, Canada
- Died: February 19, 2026 (aged 90) Calgary, Alberta, Canada
- Party: Progressive Conservative
- Spouse: Bob Sparrow (m. 1956; died 1973)
- Profession: Registered nurse; businesswoman; politician

Barbara Jane Sparrow PC (née O'Connor; July 11, 1935 – February 19, 2026) was a Canadian politician.

== Political career ==
Sparrow, a Registered Nurse and businessperson, was first elected to the House of Commons of Canada in the 1984 federal election as Member of Parliament for the Alberta riding of Calgary South. That election brought the Progressive Conservative Party of Canada to power under the leadership of Brian Mulroney. In that election she won the biggest plurality in Canadian history up to that time with 47,763 more votes than second place runner-up Harold Millican from the Liberal Party of Canada.

Redistribution of federal ridings by Elections Canada prior to the 1988 federal election abolished Sparrow's riding; in 1988, she ran and won in the new riding of Calgary Southwest. In 1991, she was named parliamentary secretary to the Minister of National Health and Welfare.

When Kim Campbell succeeded Mulroney as PC leader and prime minister in 1993, she brought Sparrow into the Cabinet as Minister of Energy, Mines and Resources and Minister of Forestry.

Both Sparrow and the Campbell government were defeated in the subsequent 1993 federal election that reduced the Tories to only two seats in the House of Commons. Sparrow lost her seat to Reform Party leader Preston Manning.

== Philanthropy ==
Sparrow joined the Junior League of Calgary, Canada in 1961, and was elected President of the League in 1969. Sparrow was also a part of many Committees within the Junior League. In line with her philanthropic interests were human rights ones. In response to a constituent, she supported the Soviet Jewry movement in Canada by requesting permission to “adopt” a refusenik, and advocated directly to Soviet authorities on their behalf.

== Personal life and death ==
Sparrow was married to her husband, Bob Sparrow, until his death in 1973.

Sparrow died in Calgary on February 19, 2026, at the age of 90.

== Electoral record ==
1993 Canadian federal election: Calgary Southwest
Party	Candidate	Votes	%	±%	Expenditures
Reform	Preston Manning	41,630	61.22	+47.80	$59,445
Progressive Conservative	Bobbie Sparrow	12,642	18.59	–46.57	$61,978
Liberal	Bill Richards	11,087	16.30	+4.77	$60,511
New Democratic	Catherine Rose	1,099	1.62	–6.49	$4,791
National	Lea Russell	910	1.34	–	$2,580
Green	Sol Candel	301	0.44	–	$6,216
Natural Law	Ida Bugmann	249	0.37	–	none listed
Independent	Miel S.R. Gabriel	57	0.08	–	$218
Communist	Darrell Rankin	28	0.04	–	$1,422
Total valid votes		68,003	99.80		
Total rejected ballots		137	0.20	+0.03	
Turnout		68,140	70.82	–9.62	
Eligible voters		96,213			
Reform gain from Progressive Conservative		Swing		+47.19	
Source: Elections Canada

1988 Canadian federal election
Party	Candidate	Votes	%
Progressive Conservative	Bobbie Sparrow	40,397	65.16
Reform	Janet Jessop	8,316	13.41
Liberal	Percy Baker	7,147	11.53
New Democratic	Vera Vogel	5,024	8.10
Independent	Larry R. Heather	669	1.08
Rhinoceros	Johnny Barretto	372	0.60
Confederation of Regions	Bill Sinclair	68	0.11
Total valid votes		61,993	100.00

1984 Canadian federal election
Party	Candidate	Votes
Progressive Conservative	Bobbie Sparrow	55,590
Liberal	Harold Millican	7,827
New Democratic	Brendan Quigley	6,135
Confederation of Regions	Phyllis Kobley	866
Independent	Larry Heather	800
Commonwealth of Canada	Bill Bohdan	136
