= Calgary West =

Former federal electoral district in Alberta, Canada

Coordinates: 51.069°N 114.177°W

Alberta electoral district
- Calgary West in relation to the other Calgary ridings

Defunct federal electoral district
- Legislature: House of Commons
- District created: 1979
- District abolished: 2013
- First contested: 1979
- Last contested: 2011
- District webpage: profile, map

Demographics
- Population (2011): 149,593
- Electors (2011): 101,673
- Area (km²): 89.06
- Census division: Division No. 6
- Census subdivision: Calgary

Calgary West was a federal electoral district in Alberta, Canada, that was represented in the House of Commons of Canada from 1917 to 1953, and from 1979 to 2015. It was in the western part of the City of Calgary. The electoral district was originally created in 1914 from Calgary riding. It was abolished in 1952 with parts being transferred to Calgary North, Calgary South, Bow River and Red Deer ridings. It was re-created in 1976 from Calgary North, Calgary South, Calgary Centre, and Palliser ridings. It was abolished during the 2012 Canadian federal electoral redistribution into Calgary Signal Hill (58%), Calgary Rocky Ridge (25%), and Calgary Confederation (17%).

From 1993 to 1997, Calgary West was represented by Stephen Harper, Prime Minister of Canada from 2006 to 2015. Harper represented the nearby riding of Calgary Southwest as leader of the Opposition (from 2002) and prime minister (from 2006).

== Members of Parliament ==
This riding elected the following members of Parliament:

Parliament	Years	Member	Party
Calgary West; Riding created from Calgary
13th	1917–1921	Thomas Tweedie	Government (Unionist)
14th	1921–1925	Joseph Tweed Shaw	Independent Labour
15th	1925–1926	R.B. Bennett	Conservative
16th	1926–1930	R.B. Bennett	Conservative
17th	1930–1935	R.B. Bennett	Conservative
18th	1935–1939	R.B. Bennett	Conservative
18th	1939–1940	Douglas Cunnington	Conservative
19th	1940–1945	Manley Justin Edwards	Liberal
20th	1945–1949	Arthur LeRoy Smith	Progressive Conservative
21st	1949–1951	Arthur LeRoy Smith	Progressive Conservative
21st	1951–1953	Carl Nickle	Progressive Conservative
Riding dissolved into Calgary North, Calgary South, Bow River and Red Deer
Riding re-created from Calgary North, Calgary South, Calgary Centre, and Palliser
31st	1979–1980	Jim Hawkes	Progressive Conservative
32nd	1980–1984	Jim Hawkes	Progressive Conservative
33rd	1984–1988	Jim Hawkes	Progressive Conservative
34th	1988–1993	Jim Hawkes	Progressive Conservative
35th	1993–1997	Stephen Harper	Reform
36th	1997–2000	Rob Anders	Reform
36th	2000–2000	Rob Anders	Alliance
37th	2000–2003	Rob Anders	Alliance
37th	2003–2004	Rob Anders	Conservative
38th	2004–2006	Rob Anders	Conservative
39th	2006–2008	Rob Anders	Conservative
40th	2008–2011	Rob Anders	Conservative
41st	2011–2015	Rob Anders	Conservative
Riding dissolved into Calgary Signal Hill, Calgary Rocky Ridge and Calgary Confederation

== Election results ==
=== 1979–2015 ===
2011 Canadian federal election
Party	Candidate	Votes	%	±%	Expenditures
Conservative	Rob Anders	39,996	62.16	+4.80	$81,410.49
Liberal	Janice Kinch	11,374	17.68	–4.22	$33,329.79
New Democratic	Shawna Knowles	6,679	10.38	+4.02	none listed
Green	Anna Lisa Wagner	6,070	9.43	–1.72	$15,273.51
Marxist–Leninist	André Vachon	227	0.35	+0.09	none listed
Total valid votes/expense limit		64,346	99.48	–	$102,535.56
Total rejected ballots		338	0.52	+0.15	
Turnout		64,684	62.31	+1.35	
Eligible voters		103,812			
Conservative hold		Swing		+4.51	
Source: Elections Canada

2008 Canadian federal election
Party	Candidate	Votes	%	±%	Expenditures
Conservative	Rob Anders	34,579	57.36	–1.35	$68,258.15
Liberal	Jennifer Pollock	13,204	21.90	–0.22	$37,011.00
Green	Randy Weeks	6,722	11.15	+0.88	$7,302.92
New Democratic	Teale Phelps Bondaroff	3,832	6.36	–1.93	$7,402.49
Independent	Kirk Schmidt	1,790	2.97	–	$14,320.85
Marxist–Leninist	André Vachon	155	0.26	+0.07	none listed
Total valid votes/expense limit		60,282	99.63	–	$96,908.75
Total rejected ballots		221	0.37	+0.08	
Turnout		60,503	60.96	–8.99	
Eligible voters		99,255			
Conservative hold		Swing		+0.79	
Source: Elections Canada

2006 Canadian federal election
Party	Candidate	Votes	%	±%	Expenditures
Conservative	Rob Anders	38,020	58.71	+2.81	$46,414.21
Liberal	Jennifer Pollock	14,328	22.12	–7.15	$61,321.36
Green	Danielle Roberts	6,653	10.27	+2.64	$200.00
New Democratic	Teale Phelps Bondaroff	5,370	8.29	+1.81	$2,748.10
Canadian Action	Tim Cayzer	265	0.41	–0.15	$2,255.49
Marxist–Leninist	André Vachon	125	0.19	+0.03	$20.00
Total valid votes/expense limit		64,761	99.71	–	$87,014.95
Total rejected ballots		191	0.29	–0.04	
Turnout		64,952	69.95	+2.43	
Eligible voters		92,857			
Conservative hold		Swing		+4.98	
Source: Elections Canada

2004 Canadian federal election
Party	Candidate	Votes	%	±%	Expenditures
Conservative	Rob Anders	31,322	55.90	–19.72	$64,219.43
Liberal	Justin Thompson	16,402	29.27	+11.08	$37,217.59
Green	Danielle Roberts	4,274	7.63	+5.26	$593.63
New Democratic	Tim Patterson	3,632	6.48	+2.46	$2,317.53
Canadian Action	James Stephen Kohut	315	0.56	–	$620.00
Marxist–Leninist	André Vachon	87	0.16	–	none listed
Total valid votes/expense limit		56,032	99.67	–	$79,893.35
Total rejected ballots		184	0.33	+0.13	
Turnout		56,216	67.52	+5.65	
Eligible voters		83,259			
Conservative notional hold		Swing		–15.40	
Source: Elections Canada

2000 Canadian federal election
Party	Candidate	Votes	%	±%	Expenditures
Alliance	Rob Anders	33,222	54.05	+6.85	$54,150
Progressive Conservative	Jim Silye	13,259	21.57	+3.37	$26,369
Liberal	Frank Bruseker	11,181	18.19	–10.80	$15,745
New Democratic	Greg Klassen	2,350	3.82	–0.17	$1,540
Green	Evan Osenton	1,456	2.37	+1.31	$1,069
Total valid votes		61,468	99.80		
Total rejected ballots		122	0.20	–0.04	
Turnout		61,590	61.87	–2.84	
Eligible voters		99,550			
Alliance notional hold		Swing		+14.21	
Source: Elections Canada

1997 Canadian federal election
Party	Candidate	Votes	%	±%	Expenditures
Reform	Rob Anders	24,878	47.20	–5.05	$55,330
Liberal	Dave Bronconnier	15,277	28.99	+2.50	$65,590
Progressive Conservative	Sergei Scurfield	9,594	18.20	+2.48	$43,365
New Democratic	Michael Kozakavich	2,105	3.99	+1.93	$1,506
Green	Jack Locke	557	1.06	+0.46	$1,210
Natural Law	Frank Haika	293	0.56	–0.28	$1,149
Total valid votes		52,704	99.76		
Total rejected ballots		128	0.24	+0.01	
Turnout		52,832	64.71	–1.58	
Eligible voters		81,644			
Reform hold		Swing		–3.78	
Source: Elections Canada

1993 Canadian federal election
Party	Candidate	Votes	%	±%
Reform	Stephen Harper	30,209	52.25	+35.67
Liberal	Karen Gainer	15,314	26.49	+13.92
Progressive Conservative	Jim Hawkes	9,090	15.72	–42.80
New Democratic	Rudy Rogers	1,194	2.06	–9.55
National	Kathleen McNeil	1,068	1.85	–
Natural Law	Frank Haika	483	0.84	–
Green	Don Francis	347	0.60	–
Christian Heritage	Larry R. Heather	116	0.20	–
Total valid votes		57,821	99.77	
Total rejected ballots		133	0.23	+0.02
Turnout		57,954	66.29	–12.46
Eligible voters		87,421		
Reform gain from Progressive Conservative		Swing		+24.80
Source: Elections Canada

1988 Canadian federal election
Party	Candidate	Votes	%	±%
Progressive Conservative	Jim Hawkes	32,025	58.52	–16.18
Reform	Stephen Harper	9,074	16.58	–
Liberal	John Phillips	6,880	12.57	+1.14
New Democratic	Richard D. Vanderberg	6,355	11.61	+0.85
Libertarian	David Faren	225	0.41	–0.05
Confederation of Regions	Brent Morin	170	0.31	–0.73
Total valid votes		54,729	99.79	
Total rejected ballots		117	0.21	–0.05
Turnout		54,846	78.75	+4.27
Eligible voters		69,650		
Progressive Conservative hold		Swing		–16.38
Source: Elections Canada

1984 Canadian federal election
Party	Candidate	Votes	%	±%
Progressive Conservative	Jim Hawkes	37,565	74.70	+8.85
Liberal	Bill Code	5,749	11.43	–11.66
New Democratic	Ed Smith	5,409	10.76	+3.08
Green	Martin-John McDonald	605	1.20	–
Confederation of Regions	Cliff Ginn	523	1.04	–
Libertarian	Frank Ceri	233	0.46	–
Social Credit	Doug Williams	201	0.40	–0.33
Total valid votes		50,285	99.74	
Total rejected ballots		133	0.26	+0.07
Turnout		50,418	74.48	+9.77
Eligible voters		67,697		
Progressive Conservative hold		Swing		+10.26
Source: Elections Canada

1980 Canadian federal election
Party	Candidate	Votes	%	±%
Progressive Conservative	Jim Hawkes	26,639	65.85	+0.46
Liberal	Jerry Arshinoff	9,339	23.09	–1.62
New Democratic	Bob Ritchie	3,107	7.68	–0.80
Rhinoceros	Anthony G. Petti	1,027	2.54	–
Social Credit	Ada Major	294	0.73	–0.45
Marxist–Leninist	John Musgrave	45	0.11	–
Total valid votes		40,451	99.81	
Total rejected ballots		76	0.19	–0.24
Turnout		40,527	64.71	–8.53
Eligible voters		62,624		
Progressive Conservative hold		Swing		+1.04
Source: Elections Canada

1979 Canadian federal election
Party	Candidate	Votes	%	±%
Progressive Conservative	Jim Hawkes	28,474	65.39	–
Liberal	Doug Lauchlan	10,762	24.71	–
New Democratic	Jack D. Peters	3,694	8.48	–
Social Credit	Dennis Shupe	512	1.18	–
Communist	Joan Jenkins	104	0.24	–
Total valid votes		43,546	99.57	
Total rejected ballots		186	0.43	+0.43
Turnout		43,732	73.24	–
Eligible voters		59,708		
Progressive Conservative hold		Swing		+45.05
Source: Elections Canada

=== 1951 by-election ===
Canadian federal by-election, December 10, 1951 Resignation of Arthur LeRoy Smith on July 5, 1951
Party	Candidate	Votes	%	±%
Progressive Conservative	Carl Nickle	10,686	47.29	+4.64
Liberal	Frank Gordon Buchanan	6,424	28.43	–3.66
Social Credit	Arthur J. Dixon	5,489	24.29	–0.97
Total valid votes		22,599	100.00	
Total rejected ballots		unknown		
Turnout		22,599	–	–
Eligible voters				
Progressive Conservative hold		Swing		+4.15
Source: Library of Parliament

=== 1917–1949 ===
1949 Canadian federal election
Party	Candidate	Votes	%	±%
Progressive Conservative	Arthur LeRoy Smith	11,457	42.65	+4.21
Liberal	Charles Curtice Matthews	8,619	32.09	+10.38
Social Credit	Arthur J. Dixon	6,785	25.26	+4.61
Total valid votes		26,861	99.29	
Total rejected ballots		193	0.71	–1.04
Turnout		27,054	70.76	–7.32
Eligible voters		38,231		
Progressive Conservative hold		Swing		+7.30
Source: Library of Parliament

1945 Canadian federal election
Party	Candidate	Votes	%	±%
Progressive Conservative	Arthur LeRoy Smith	8,872	38.44	+3.61
Liberal	Charles Curtice Matthews	5,011	21.71	–15.16
Social Credit	Andrew Henry Jukes	4,766	20.65	–0.36
Co-operative Commonwealth	Ken Simpson Tory	3,641	15.77	+8.48
Labor–Progressive	Duncan Archibald Mackenzie	791	3.43	–
Total valid votes		23,081	98.25	
Total rejected ballots		411	1.75	+0.77
Turnout		23,492	78.08	+4.19
Eligible voters		30,089		
Progressive Conservative gain from Liberal		Swing		+9.39
Note: Progressive Conservative vote is compared to "National Government" vote in 1940 election. Social Credit vote is compared to New Democracy vote in 1940 election.
Source: Library of Parliament

1940 Canadian federal election
Party	Candidate	Votes	%	±%
Liberal	Manley Justin Edwards	7,299	36.87	+25.18
National Government	Douglas Cunnington	6,896	34.83	–15.52
New Democracy	Rose Wilkinson	4,159	21.01	+17.24
Co-operative Commonwealth	J. Albert Johnson	1,444	7.29	+3.52
Total valid votes		19,798	99.02	
Total rejected ballots		196	0.98	–
Turnout		19,994	73.89	–
Eligible voters		27,059		
Liberal gain from Conservative		Swing		+20.35
Note: "National Government" vote is compared to Conservative vote in 1935 election. New Democracy vote is compared to Social Credit vote in 1935 election.
Source: Library of Parliament

Canadian federal by-election, September 18, 1939 Resignation of R. B. Bennett on January 28, 1939
Party	Candidate	Votes	%	
Conservative	Douglas Cunnington	acclaimed	–	
Conservative hold		Swing		–
Source: Library of Parliament

1935 Canadian federal election
Party	Candidate	Votes	%	±%
Conservative	R. B. Bennett	9,172	50.35	–7.57
Social Credit	Robert Lincoln Reid	5,817	31.93	–
Liberal	Peter Laurence Hyde	2,130	11.69	–18.08
Co-operative Commonwealth	Henry Horricks	686	3.77	–
Reconstruction	Charles Thomas Galbraith	411	2.26	–
Total valid votes		18,216	99.21	
Total rejected ballots		145	0.79	–
Turnout		18,361	73.68	–
Eligible voters		24,919		
Conservative hold		Swing		+8.86
Source: Library of Parliament

Canadian federal by-election, August 25, 1930 Ministerial by-election for R. B. Bennett
Party	Candidate	Votes	%	
Conservative	R. B. Bennett	acclaimed	–	
Total valid votes		–		
Conservative hold		Swing		–
Source: Library of Parliament

1930 Canadian federal election
Party	Candidate	Votes	%	±%
Conservative	R. B. Bennett	13,883	70.22	+12.30
Liberal	Colin Campbell McLaurin	5,887	29.78	–12.30
Total valid votes		19,770	100.00	
Total rejected ballots		unknown		
Turnout		19,770	71.45	+2.74
Eligible voters		27,669		
Conservative hold		Swing		+12.30
Source: Library of Parliament

1926 Canadian federal election
Party	Candidate	Votes	%	±%
Conservative	R. B. Bennett	8,951	57.92	–5.02
Liberal	Harry William Lunney	6,502	42.08	–
Total valid votes		15,453	100.00	
Total rejected ballots		unknown		
Turnout		15,453	68.71	+2.24
Eligible voters		22,491		
Conservative hold		Swing		–23.55
Source: Library of Parliament

1925 Canadian federal election
Party	Candidate	Votes	%	±%
Conservative	R. B. Bennett	10,256	62.94	+17.19
Labour	Joseph Tweed Shaw	6,040	37.06	–8.79
Total valid votes		16,296	100.00	
Total rejected ballots		unknown		
Turnout		16,296	66.47	–1.83
Eligible voters		24,517		
Conservative gain from Labour		Swing		+12.99
Source: Library of Parliament

1921 Canadian federal election
Party	Candidate	Votes	%	±%
Labour	Joseph Tweed Shaw	7,369	45.85	–
Conservative	R. B. Bennett	7,353	45.75	–
Liberal	Edward Faustinus Ryan	1,351	8.41	–
Total valid votes		16,073	100.00	
Total rejected ballots		unknown		
Turnout		16,073	68.30	–39.14
Eligible voters		23,534		
Labour gain from Government (Unionist)		Swing		+45.80
Source: Library of Parliament

1917 Canadian federal election
Party	Candidate	Votes	%	±%
Government (Unionist)	Thomas Tweedie	10,986	73.24	–
Opposition	John Alfred Irvine	4,015	26.76	–
Total valid votes		15,001	100.00	
Total rejected ballots		unknown		
Turnout		15,001	107.44	–
Eligible voters		13,962		
Government (Unionist) notional hold		Swing		N/A
Source: Library of Parliament

== See also ==
- List of Canadian electoral districts
- Historical federal electoral districts of Canada

Parliament of Canada
Preceded by Prince Albert	Constituency represented by the prime minister 1930–1935	Succeeded by Prince Albert
