= Jim Hawkes =

Canadian politician (1934–2019)

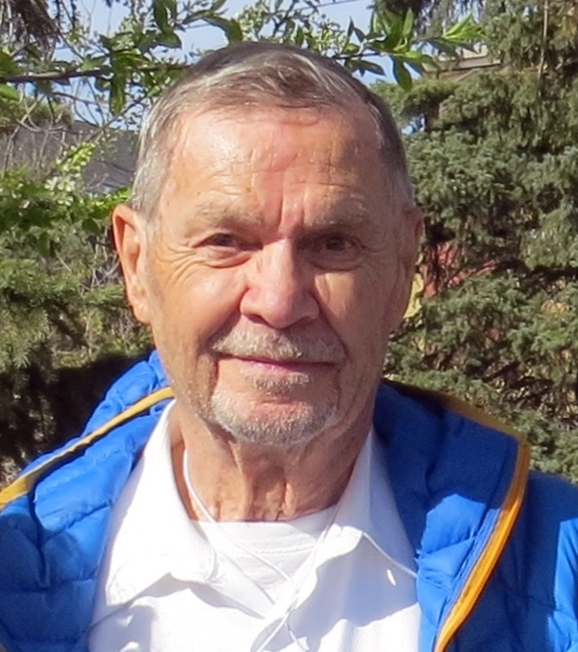
- Jim Hawkes in 2015.

Member of the Canadian Parliament for Calgary West
- In office 1979–1993
- Preceded by: Riding created in 1976
- Succeeded by: Stephen Harper

Personal details
- Born: Frederick James Hawkes; June 21, 1934 Calgary, Alberta, Canada
- Died: May 9, 2019 (aged 84) Calgary, Alberta, Canada
- Party: Progressive Conservative
- Spouse: Joanne Christian Herriot (m. 1957; died 2013)
- Children: 3, including Terri Hawkes

Frederick James Hawkes (June 21, 1934 – May 9, 2019) was a Canadian politician. He was the Member of Parliament for Calgary West from 1979 until 1993.

== Early life and education ==
Hawkes was born in Calgary, Alberta. He studied at Sir George Williams University (now Concordia University), obtaining a B.A. degree in 1957.

Hawkes returned to academia after several years to study psychology, earning an M.Sc. degree in this field from the University of Calgary in 1968, and a Ph.D. degree in experimental psychology from Colorado State University in 1970.

In 1971, Hawkes became an associate professor in the Faculty of Social Welfare at the University of Calgary, then in 1975 he received tenure.

== Political career ==
In 1976–1977, Hawkes served as a program director for Joe Clark, then leader of the Progressive Conservative Party and Leader of the Opposition.

In 1979, he ran as the Progressive Conservative candidate for the re-established riding of Calgary West, and was elected to the House of Commons. He was re-elected in 1980, 1984, and 1988.

From 1985 to 1986, Hawkes' chief aide was future prime minister Stephen Harper. Harper's term as aide was short, and he later described this time in Ottawa as deeply disillusioning.

Hawkes was re-elected in the 1988 election in which his chief opponent was his former protégé Harper, now running for the newly founded Reform Party of Canada. Hawkes defeated Harper by nearly 23,000 votes.

From 1988 to 1993, Hawkes also served as the Chief Government Whip in the House of Commons, serving under Brian Mulroney.

In the 1993 federal election, Hawkes came third behind Harper (who won) and Liberal candidate Karen Gainer, becoming one of many PC MPs who were defeated at the polls.

== Personal life and death ==
In 1957, Hawkes married Joanne Christine Herriot (1937–2013). The Hawkes had two living children: Teresa Anne "Terri" (born 1958) and Robert James (born 1961). Robert Hawkes reached Master level in chess by his late teens. They had another daughter, Colleen Rose, who died four days after birth.

During the final years of his life, Hawkes had dementia. He died in Calgary on May 9, 2019, at the age of 84.
