= Arthur LeRoy Smith =

Canadian politician

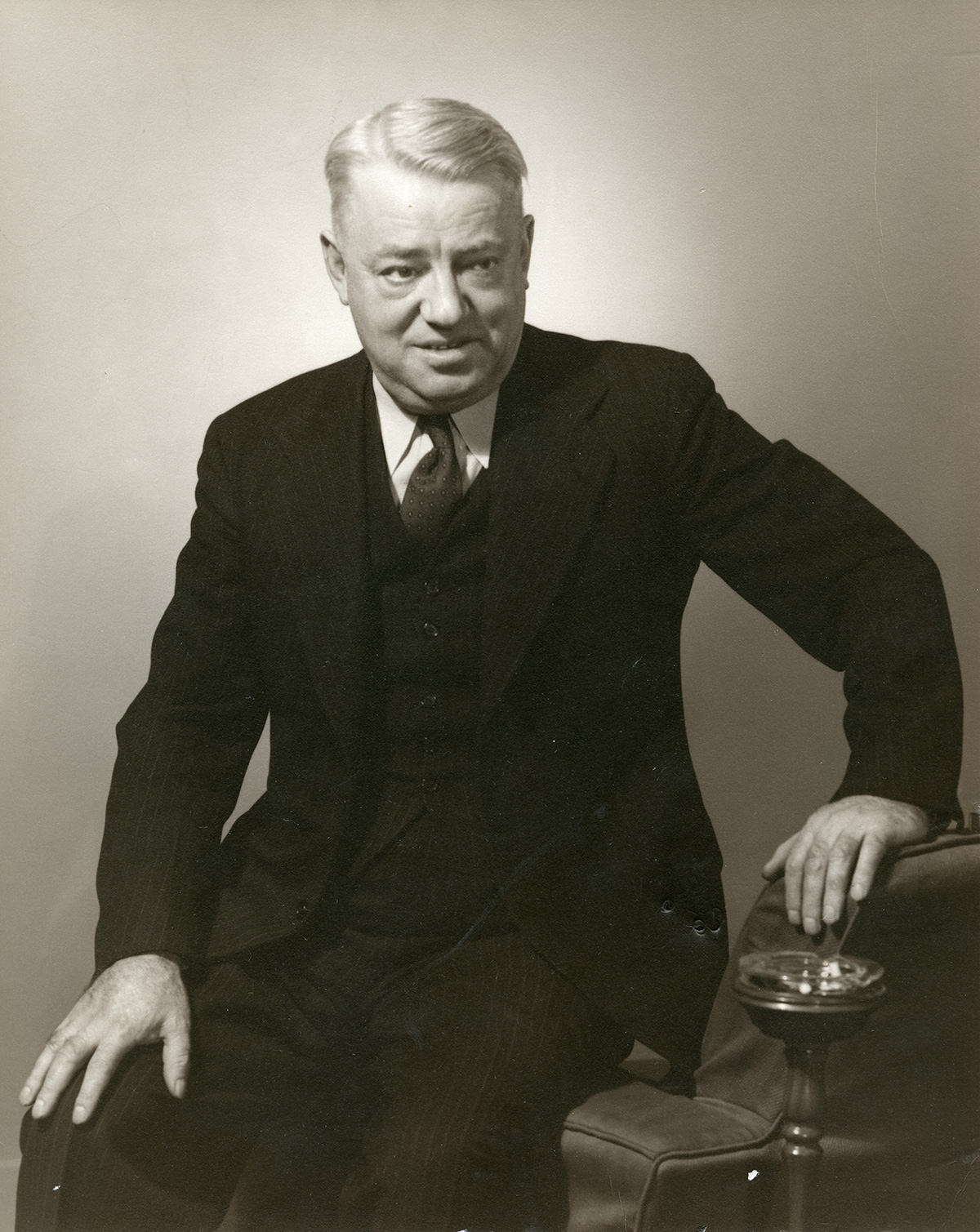
- Arthur LeRoy Smith in 1930

Member of the House of Commons of Canada
- In office 1945–1951
- Constituency: Calgary West

Personal details
- Born: February 13, 1886; Regina, Northwest Territories
- Died: December 17, 1951 (aged 65); Calgary, Alberta
- Political party: Conservative
- Children: Arthur Ryan Smith
- Occupation: Lawyer, inventor, politician

Arthur LeRoy Smith Sr. (February 13, 1886 – December 17, 1951) was a Canadian barrister, inventor and federal politician. He was born in Regina, Northwest Territories.

Smith first ran for a seat in the House of Commons of Canada as a Conservative candidate in the 1921 federal election in the East Calgary riding, he was defeated by William Irvine. He would not make another attempt at winning a seat for almost 25 years.

Smith filed a patent on an Air Heating System with the Canadian Intellectual Property Office on September 29, 1936. He also defended Premier of Alberta John Edward Brownlee in MacMillan v. Brownlee.

Smith would make a second attempt at federal politics. This time he ran in the Calgary West riding in the 1945 federal election defeating four other candidates to win his first term in office. He would run for re-election in the 1949 federal election winning his second term by a comfortable margin. Smith would be forced to resign his seat on July 5, 1951, due to health complications. He died in Calgary five months later on December 17, 1951.

Smith's son Arthur Ryan Smith also served as a Member of Parliament and a Member of the Legislative Assembly of Alberta.

Parliament of Canada
Preceded by Manley Justin Edwards	Member of Parliament Calgary West; 1945-1951	Succeeded by Carl Olof Nickle
