= Carl Nickle =

Canadian politician

Lieutenant Carl Olof Nickle (July 12, 1914, in Winnipeg, Manitoba – December 5, 1990) was an editor and publisher, oil baron, soldier in the Canadian Army and served as a Canadian federal politician from 1951 to 1957.

Nickle served a nine-year career in the Canadian Forces. He joined in 1939 and served in the Calgary Highlanders achieving the rank of lieutenant. Nickle left the Army in 1948. Nickle first ran for a seat in the House of Commons of Canada in a by-election held in the electoral district of Calgary West on December 10, 1951. Nickle won the by-election and his first term in office by a comfortable margin. Calgary's electoral boundaries would be redistributed at the drop of the writ for the 1953 federal election. He would run in the new electoral district of Calgary South and be re-elected defeating 4 other candidates. He retired from federal politics at the end of his second term in 1957.

Nickle was admitted to the Order of Canada in 1974.

Parliament of Canada
Preceded by Arthur LeRoy Smith	Member of Parliament Calgary West; 1951-1953	Succeeded by Jim Hawkes
Preceded by New District	Member of Parliament Calgary South; 1953-1957	Succeeded by Arthur Ryan Smith
