= Jack Leslie (politician) =

Canadian politician and businessman

29th Mayor of Calgary
- In office October 18, 1965 – October 22, 1969
- Preceded by: Grant MacEwan
- Succeeded by: Rod Sykes

Personal details
- Born: June 15, 1920 Calgary, Alberta
- Died: December 27, 2010 (aged 90) Calgary, Alberta

John Clifford Leslie (June 15, 1920 – December 27, 2010) was a Canadian politician and businessman and the first native-born Calgarian elected as mayor of the city.

Born in Calgary, Jack Leslie received his primary and secondary school education in Calgary and attended the University of Alberta. With the outbreak of war, he left his studies in Edmonton and joined the Royal Canadian Air Force. He saw four years service as a pilot. Following the war, he obtained his A.A.C.I. degree from the Appraisal Institute of Canada and began to pursue a career in real estate.

In 1962, he ran for City Council and was elected as the representative for Ward 4. Jack Leslie served four years as an Alderman. He was instrumental in establishing the School Board Liaison Committee; led a successful fight to keep the Canadian Pacific Railway tracks off the banks of the Bow River; developed Nose Hill and Confederation parks; helped achieve "International" Airport status for Calgary; established the Airport Authority.

Leslie was elected mayor in 1965; he was the first native-born Calgarian to be elected mayor. During his tenure, major low-cost housing schemes were undertaken in several areas of the city, including Urban Renewal efforts; the Palliser Square project was completed and the transformation of Prince's Island into one of the city's beauty spots was begun.

He also assisted in making Deerfoot Trail a safer road by implementing plans for proper intersections and cloverleafs.

He served as mayor until 1969, being re-elected in 1967.

Since returning to private life, Leslie has resumed his real estate appraisal business and lived in Calgary with his wife, the former Jean Logan, whom he married in 1942.

Political offices
Preceded by John Walter Grant MacEwan	Mayor of Calgary; 1965–1969	Succeeded by James Rodney Winter Sykes
