= 19th Canadian Ministry =

Government cabinet of Canada (1963–1968)

19th Canadian Ministry 19e conseil des ministres du Canada
- 19th ministry of Canada

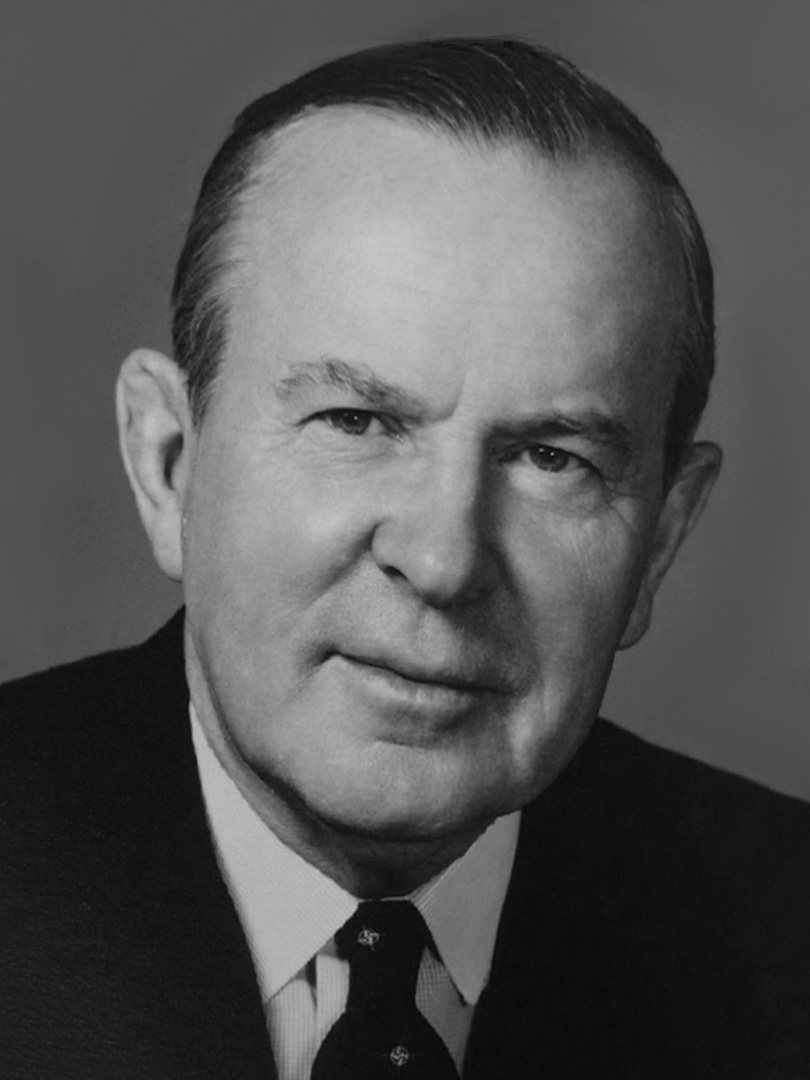
- Date formed: 22 April 1963
- Date dissolved: 20 April 1968

People and organizations
- Monarch: Elizabeth II
- Governor General: Georges Vanier (1963–1967); Roland Michener (1967–1968)
- Prime Minister: Lester B. Pearson
- Member party: Liberal
- Status in legislature: Minority
- Opposition party: Progressive Conservative
- Opposition leader: John Diefenbaker (1963–1967); Michael Starr (1967); Robert Stanfield (1967–1968)

History
- Incoming formation: 1963 federal election
- Outgoing formation: 1968 Liberal leadership election
- Elections: 1963, 1965
- Legislature terms: 26th Canadian Parliament; 27th Canadian Parliament
- Predecessor: 18th Canadian Ministry
- Successor: 20th Canadian Ministry

The Nineteenth Canadian Ministry was the cabinet chaired by Prime Minister Lester B. Pearson. It governed Canada from 22 April 1963 to 20 April 1968, including all of the 26th Canadian Parliament, and most of the 27th. The government was formed by the Liberal Party of Canada.

== Ministers ==
Portfolio	Minister	Term	
Portfolio	Minister	Start	End
Prime Minister	Lester Pearson	22 April 1963	20 April 1968
Minister of Agriculture	Harry Hays	22 April 1963	18 December 1965
Minister of Agriculture	Joe Greene	18 December 1965	20 April 1968
Minister of Amateur Sport	Judy LaMarsh	22 April 1963	18 December 1965
Minister of Amateur Sport	Allan MacEachen	18 December 1965	20 April 1968
Minister responsible for the Canadian Dairy Commission	Joe Greene	1 October 1966	20 April 1968
Minister for Canada Mortgage and Housing Corporation	Jack Garland	22 April 1963	14 March 1964
Minister for Canada Mortgage and Housing Corporation	George McIlraith (acting)	14 March 1964	19 March 1964
Minister for Canada Mortgage and Housing Corporation	John Robert Nicholson	19 March 1964	18 January 1968
Minister for Canada Mortgage and Housing Corporation	Edgar Benson	18 January 1968	20 April 1968
Minister for the Canadian Wheat Board	Mitchell Sharp	22 April 1963	4 January 1966
Minister for the Canadian Wheat Board	Robert Winters	4 January 1966	30 March 1968
Minister for the Canadian Wheat Board	Jean-Luc Pépin (acting)	30 March 1968	20 April 1968
Minister of Citizenship and Immigration	Guy Favreau	22 April 1963	3 February 1964
Minister of Citizenship and Immigration	René Tremblay	3 February 1964	15 February 1965
Minister of Citizenship and Immigration	John Robert Nicholson	15 February 1965	18 December 1965
Minister of Citizenship and Immigration	Jean Marchand	18 December 1965	1 October 1966
Minister of Consumer and Corporate Affairs and Registrar General	John Turner	21 December 1967	20 April 1968
Minister for Defence Construction Limited	Charles Drury	22 April 1963	18 December 1965
Minister for Defence Construction Limited	Paul Hellyer	18 December 1965	19 September 1967
Minister for Defence Construction Limited	Léo Cadieux	19 September 1967	20 April 1968
Minister of Defence Production	Charles Drury	22 April 1963	20 April 1968
Minister of Energy, Mines, and Resources	Jean-Luc Pépin	1 October 1966	20 April 1968
Secretary of State for External Affairs	Paul Martin Sr.	22 April 1963	20 April 1968
Minister of Finance and Receiver General	Walter Gordon	22 April 1963	11 November 1965
Minister of Finance and Receiver General	Mitchell Sharp	11 November 1965	20 April 1968
Minister of Fisheries	Hédard Robichaud	22 April 1963	20 April 1968
Minister of Forestry	John Robert Nicholson	22 April 1963	3 February 1964
Minister of Forestry	Maurice Sauvé	3 February 1964	1 October 1966
Minister of Forestry and Rural Development	Maurice Sauvé	1 October 1966	20 April 1968
Minister in charge of Housing	Edgar Benson	18 January 1968	20 April 1968
Minister responsible for Housing	Paul Hellyer	18 January 1968	20 April 1968
Minister responsible for Indian Affairs	Guy Favreau	22 April 1963	3 February 1964
Minister responsible for Indian Affairs	René Tremblay	3 February 1964	15 February 1965
Minister responsible for Indian Affairs	John Robert Nicholson	15 February 1965	18 December 1965
Minister responsible for Indian Affairs	Jean Marchand	18 December 1965	1 October 1966
Minister of Indian Affairs and Northern Development	Arthur Laing	1 October 1966	20 April 1968
Minister of Industry	Charles Drury	25 July 1963	20 April 1968
Minister of Justice and Attorney General	Lionel Chevrier	22 April 1963	3 February 1964
Minister of Justice and Attorney General	Guy Favreau	3 February 1964	30 June 1965
Minister of Justice and Attorney General	George McIlraith (acting)	30 June 1965	7 July 1965
Minister of Justice and Attorney General	Lucien Cardin	7 July 1965	4 April 1967
Minister of Justice and Attorney General	Pierre Trudeau	4 April 1967	20 April 1968
Minister of Labour	Allan MacEachen	22 April 1963	18 December 1965
Minister of Labour	John Robert Nicholson	18 December 1965	20 April 1968
Leader of the Government in the House of Commons	Jack Pickersgill	22 April 1963	3 February 1964
Leader of the Government in the House of Commons	Guy Favreau	3 February 1964	30 October 1964
Leader of the Government in the House of Commons	George McIlraith	30 October 1964	4 May 1967
Leader of the Government in the House of Commons	Allan MacEachen	4 May 1967	20 April 1968
Leader of the Government in the Senate	William Ross Macdonald	22 April 1963	3 February 1964
Leader of the Government in the Senate	John Joseph Connolly	3 February 1964	20 April 1968
Minister of Manpower and Immigration	Jean Marchand	1 October 1966	20 April 1968
Minister of Mines and Technical Surveys	William Moore Benidickson	22 April 1963	7 July 1965
Minister of Mines and Technical Surveys	John Watson MacNaught	7 July 1965	18 December 1965
Minister of Mines and Technical Surveys	Jean-Luc Pépin	18 December 1965	1 October 1966
Minister for National Capital Commission	Jean-Paul Deschatelets	22 April 1963	15 February 1965
Minister for National Capital Commission	Lucien Cardin	15 February 1965	7 July 1965
Minister for National Capital Commission	George McIlraith	7 July 1965	20 April 1968
Associate Minister of National Defence	Lucien Cardin	22 April 1963	15 February 1965
Associate Minister of National Defence	Léo Cadieux	15 February 1965	19 September 1967
Associate Minister of National Defence	Vacant	19 September 1967	20 April 1968
Minister of National Defence	Paul Hellyer	22 April 1963	19 September 1967
Minister of National Defence	Léo Cadieux	19 September 1967	20 April 1968
Minister of National Health and Welfare	Judy LaMarsh	22 April 1963	18 December 1965
Minister of National Health and Welfare	Allan MacEachen	18 December 1965	20 April 1968
Minister of National Revenue	Jack Garland	22 April 1963	14 March 1964
Minister of National Revenue	George McIlraith (acting)	14 March 1964	29 June 1964
Minister of National Revenue	Edgar Benson	29 June 1964	18 January 1968
Minister of National Revenue	Jean Chrétien	18 January 1968	20 April 1968
Minister of Northern Affairs and National Resources	Arthur Laing	22 April 1963	1 October 1966
Postmaster General	Azellus Denis	22 April 1963	3 February 1964
Postmaster General	John Robert Nicholson	3 February 1964	15 February 1965
Postmaster General	René Tremblay	15 February 1965	18 December 1965
Postmaster General	Jean-Pierre Côté	18 December 1965	20 April 1968
President of the Privy Council	Maurice Lamontagne	22 April 1963	3 February 1964
President of the Privy Council	George McIlraith	3 February 1964	7 July 1965
President of the Privy Council	Guy Favreau	7 July 1965	4 April 1967
President of the Privy Council	Walter Gordon	4 April 1967	11 March 1968
President of the Privy Council	Pierre Trudeau (acting)	11 March 1968	20 April 1968
Minister of Public Works	Jean-Paul Deschatelets	22 April 1963	11 February 1965
Minister of Public Works	Lucien Cardin	11 February 1965	7 July 1965
Minister of Public Works	George McIlraith	7 July 1965	20 April 1968
Registrar General of Canada	Jack Pickersgill	22 April 1963	3 February 1964
Registrar General of Canada	Maurice Lamontagne	3 February 1964	18 December 1965
Registrar General of Canada	Judy LaMarsh	18 December 1965	1 October 1966
Registrar General of Canada	Guy Favreau	1 October 1966	4 April 1967
Registrar General of Canada	John Turner	4 April 1967	21 December 1967
Secretary of State for Canada	Jack Pickersgill	22 April 1963	3 February 1964
Secretary of State for Canada	Maurice Lamontagne	3 February 1964	18 December 1965
Secretary of State for Canada	Judy LaMarsh	18 December 1965	10 April 1968
Secretary of State for Canada	John Joseph Connolly (acting)	10 April 1968	20 April 1968
Solicitor General	John Watson MacNaught	22 April 1963	7 July 1965
Solicitor General	Lawrence Pennell	7 July 1965	20 April 1968
Minister of Trade and Commerce	Mitchell Sharp	22 April 1963	4 January 1966
Minister of Trade and Commerce	Robert Winters	4 January 1966	30 March 1968
Minister of Trade and Commerce	Jean-Luc Pépin (acting)	30 March 1968	20 April 1968
Minister of Transport	George McIlraith	22 April 1963	3 February 1964
Minister of Transport	Jack Pickersgill	3 February 1964	19 September 1967
Minister of Transport	Paul Hellyer	19 September 1967	20 April 1968
President of the Treasury Board	Edgar Benson	1 October 1966	20 April 1968
Minister of Veterans Affairs	Roger Teillet	22 April 1963	20 April 1968
Minister without Portfolio	William Ross Macdonald	22 April 1963	3 February 1964
Minister without Portfolio	John Watson MacNaught	22 April 1963	7 July 1965
Minister without Portfolio	René Tremblay	22 April 1963	3 February 1964
Minister without Portfolio	John Joseph Connolly	3 February 1964	20 April 1968
Minister without Portfolio	Yvon Dupuis	3 February 1964	22 January 1965
Minister without Portfolio	Lawrence Pennell	7 July 1965	1 October 1966
Minister without Portfolio	Jean-Luc Pépin	7 July 1965	18 December 1965
Minister without Portfolio	John Turner	18 December 1965	4 April 1967
Minister without Portfolio	Walter Gordon	9 January 1967	4 April 1967
Minister without Portfolio	Jean Chrétien	4 April 1967	18 January 1968
Minister without Portfolio	Charles Granger	25 September 1967	20 April 1968
Minister without Portfolio	Bryce Mackasey	9 February 1968	20 April 1968

== Succession ==
Ministries of Canada
Preceded by 18th Canadian Ministry	19th Canadian Ministry; 1963–1968	Succeeded by 20th Canadian Ministry
