= Minister of Mines (Canada) =

The Minister of Mines was a Minister of the Crown in the Canadian Cabinet responsible for the mining industry in Canada.

The Department of Mines was created by the government of Sir Wilfrid Laurier and assented to on 27 April 1907. The Minister of Inland Revenue was the first to be named Minister of Mines. In 1936, the mines portfolio became part of the Minister of Mines and Resources, in 1950, Minister of Mines and Technical Surveys, in 1966 the Minister of Energy, Mines and Resources, and since 1995 the Minister of Natural Resources.

In 1936, the office of the Minister of Mines, along with those of the Minister of Immigration and Colonization, Minister of the Interior, and Superintendent-General of Indian Affairs, were abolished and the office of Minister of Mines and Resources was created by Statute 1 Edw. VIII, c. 33, proclaimed in force on 1 December 1936.

== History ==
The Department of Mines was created in April 1907 by an Act of Parliament (Statute 6-7 Edw,. VII, c. 29) under the government of Sir Wilfrid Laurier with the responsibility of "map[ping] the forest areas of Canada, and to make and report upon the investigations useful to the preservation of the forest resources of Canada." The Minister of Inland Revenue was the first to be named Minister of Mines.

The Minister of Inland Revenue, the Minister of the Interior, and the Secretary of State were designated to be ex officio the Minister of Mines on 10 October 1911, 30 March 1912, and 10 February 1913, respectively. On 31 December 1919, the Minister of the Interior was designated to be ex officio the Minister of Mines, which would last until 6 August 1930, when the portfolio was transferred to the Minister of Immigration and Colonization. The Minister of Labour took the designation soon after, on 3 February 1932.

In 1936, the office of the Minister of Mines, along with those of the Minister of Immigration and Colonization, Minister of the Interior, and Superintendent-General of Indian Affairs, were abolished and the office of Minister of Mines and Resources was created by Statute 1 Edw. VIII, c. 33, proclaimed in force on 1 December 1936.

From Mines and Resources, the mines portfolio moved to the Minister of Mines and Technical Surveys in 1950; the Minister of Energy, Mines and Resources in 1966; and, since 1995, the portfolio has belonged to the Minister of Natural Resources.

== Ministers ==
No.	Name	Period	Concurrent position	Cabinet
1.	William Templeman	May 3, 1907 – October 6, 1911	Minister of Inland Revenue	Laurier
2.	Wilfrid Bruno Nantel	October 10, 1911 – March 29, 1912	Minister of Inland Revenue	Borden
3.	Robert Rogers	March 30, 1912 – October 28, 1912	Minister of the Interior	Borden
4.	William James Roche	October 29, 1912 – February 9, 1913	Minister of the Interior	Borden
5.	Louis Coderre	February 10, 1913 – October 5, 1915	Secretary of State of Canada	Borden
6.	Pierre-Édouard Blondin	October 6, 1915 – January 7, 1917	Secretary of State of Canada	Borden
7.	Esioff-Léon Patenaude	January 8, 1917 – June 12, 1917	Secretary of State of Canada	Borden
–	Albert Sévigny (acting)	June 13, 1917 – August 24, 1917	Secretary of State of Canada	Borden
8.	Arthur Meighen	August 25, 1917 – October 12, 1917	Secretary of State of Canada	Borden
9.	Martin Burrell	October 12, 1917 – December 30, 1919	Secretary of State of Canada	Borden
10.	Arthur Meighen	December 31, 1919 – July 10, 1920	Minister of the Interior	Borden
11.	James Alexander Lougheed	July 10, 1920 – December 29, 1921	Minister of the Interior	Meighen
12.	Charles A. Stewart	December 29, 1921 – June 28, 1926	Minister of the Interior	King
–	Henry Herbert Stevens (acting)	June 29, 1926 – July 12, 1926	Minister of the Interior	Meighen
–	Richard Bedford Bennett (acting)	July 13, 1926 – September 25, 1926	Minister of the Interior	Meighen
13.	Charles A. Stewart	September 25, 1926 – August 7, 1930	Minister of the Interior	King
14.	Wesley Ashton Gordon	August 7, 1930 – October 23, 1935	Minister of Immigration and Colonization and (after 3 February 1932) Minister of Labour	Bennett
15.	Thomas Alexander Crerar	October 23, 1935 – November 30, 1936	Minister of Immigration and Colonization and Minister of the Interior	King
