= 17th Canadian Ministry =

Government cabinet of Canada (1948–1957)

17th Canadian Ministry 17e conseil des ministres du Canada
- 17th ministry of Canada

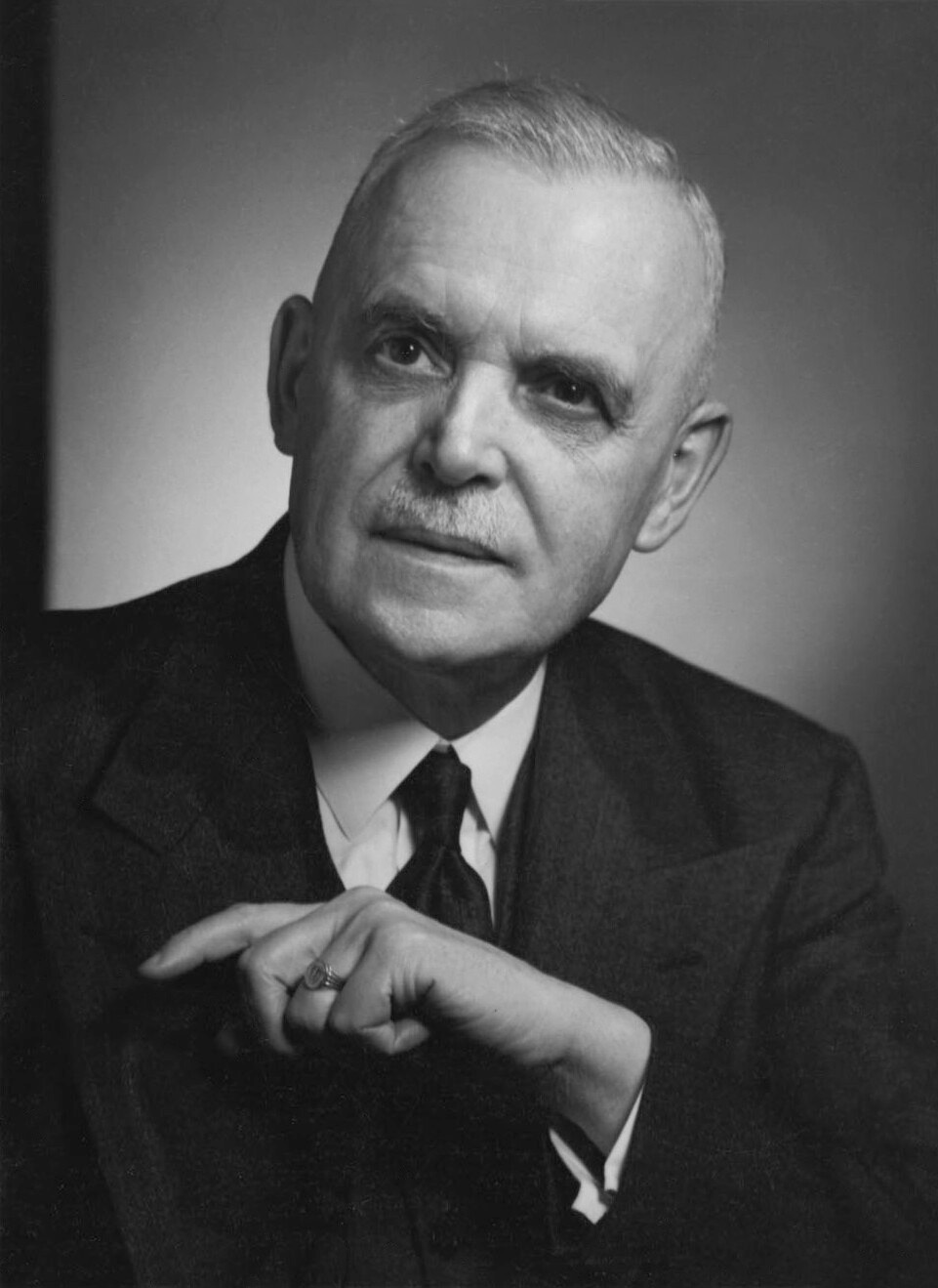
- Date formed: 15 November 1948
- Date dissolved: 21 June 1957

People and organizations
- Monarch: George VI; Elizabeth II
- Governor General: Earl Alexander; Vincent Massey
- Prime Minister: Louis St. Laurent
- Member party: Liberal Party of Canada
- Status in legislature: Minority (1948–1949); Majority (1949–1957)
- Opposition party: Progressive Conservative Party of Canada
- Opposition leader: George A. Drew (1948–1954, 1955–1956); William Earl Rowe (1954–1955, 1956); John Diefenbaker (1956–1957)

History
- Incoming formation: 1948 Liberal leadership election
- Outgoing formation: 1957 general election
- Elections: 1949, 1953
- Legislature terms: 20th Canadian Parliament; 21st Canadian Parliament; 22nd Canadian Parliament
- Predecessor: 16th Canadian Ministry
- Successor: 18th Canadian Ministry

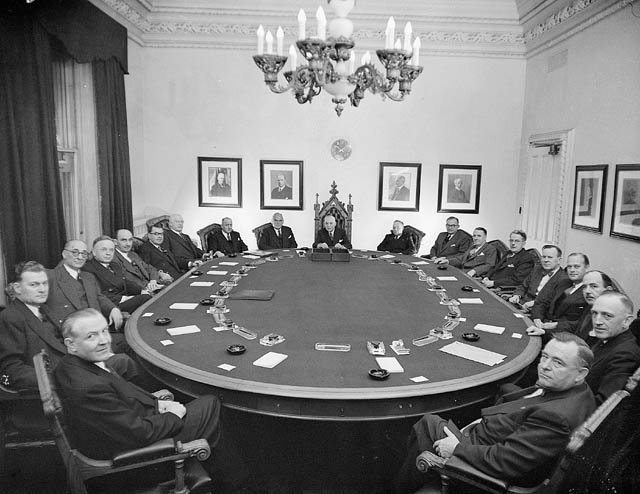
The 17th Canadian Ministry in April 1953.

The Seventeenth Canadian Ministry was the cabinet chaired by Prime Minister Louis St-Laurent. It governed Canada from 15 November 1948 to 21 June 1957, including the end of the 20th Canadian Parliament, as well as all of the 21st and 22nd. The government was formed by the Liberal Party of Canada.

== Ministers ==
Portfolio	Minister	Term	
Portfolio	Minister	Start	End
Prime Minister	Louis St. Laurent	15 November 1948	21 June 1957
Minister of Agriculture	James Garfield Gardiner	15 November 1948	21 June 1957
Minister for Canada Mortgage and Housing Corporation	Robert Winters	15 November 1948	21 June 1957
Minister for the Canadian Wheat Board	C. D. Howe	15 November 1948	21 June 1957
Minister of Citizenship and Immigration	Walter Harris	18 January 1950	1 July 1954
Minister of Citizenship and Immigration	Jack Pickersgill	1 July 1954	21 June 1957
Minister for Defence Construction Limited	C. D. Howe	1 April 1951	21 June 1957
Minister of Defence Production	C. D. Howe	1 April 1951	21 June 1957
Secretary of State for External Affairs	Lester B. Pearson	15 November 1948	21 June 1957
Minister of Finance and Receiver General	Douglas Abbott	15 November 1948	1 July 1954
Minister of Finance and Receiver General	Walter Harris	1 July 1954	21 June 1957
Minister of Fisheries	Robert Wellington Mayhew	15 November 1948	15 October 1952
Minister of Fisheries	James Sinclair	15 October 1952	21 June 1957
Minister responsible for Indian Affairs	James Angus MacKinnon	15 November 1948	1 April 1949
Minister responsible for Indian Affairs	Colin W. G. Gibson	1 April 1949	18 January 1950
Minister responsible for Indian Affairs	Walter Harris	18 January 1950	1 July 1954
Minister responsible for Indian Affairs	Jack Pickersgill	1 July 1954	21 June 1957
Minister of Justice and Attorney General	Stuart Garson	15 November 1948	21 June 1957
Minister of Labour	Humphrey Mitchell	15 November 1948	3 August 1950
Minister of Labour	Paul Martin Sr. (acting)	3 August 1950	7 August 1950
Minister of Labour	Milton Fowler Gregg	7 August 1950	21 June 1957
Leader of the Government in the House of Commons	Alphonse Fournier	15 November 1948	9 May 1953
Leader of the Government in the House of Commons	Walter Harris	9 May 1953	21 June 1957
Leader of the Government in the Senate	Wishart McLea Robertson	15 November 1948	14 October 1953
Leader of the Government in the Senate	William Ross Macdonald	14 October 1953	21 June 1957
Minister of Mines and Resources	James Angus MacKinnon	15 November 1948	1 April 1949
Minister of Mines and Resources	Colin W. G. Gibson	1 April 1949	18 January 1950
Minister of Mines and Technical Surveys	James Joseph McCann	18 January 1950	18 December 1950
Minister of Mines and Technical Surveys	George Prudham	18 December 1950	21 June 1957
Associate Minister of National Defence	Vacant	15 November 1948	12 February 1953
Associate Minister of National Defence	Ralph Campney	12 February 1953	1 July 1954
Associate Minister of National Defence	Vacant	1 July 1954	26 April 1957
Associate Minister of National Defence	Paul Hellyer	26 April 1957	21 June 1957
Minister of National Defence	Brooke Claxton	15 November 1948	1 July 1954
Minister of National Defence	Ralph Campney	1 July 1954	21 June 1957
Minister of National Health and Welfare	Paul Martin Sr.	15 November 1948	21 June 1957
Minister of National Revenue	James Joseph McCann	15 November 1948	21 June 1957
Minister of Northern Affairs and National Resources	Jean Lesage	16 December 1953	21 June 1957
Postmaster General	Ernest Bertrand	15 November 1948	25 August 1949
Postmaster General	Édouard Rinfret	25 August 1949	13 February 1952
Postmaster General	Alcide Côté	13 February 1952	8 August 1955
Postmaster General	Vacant (Walter James Turnbull was acting)	8 August 1955	16 August 1955
Postmaster General	Roch Pinard (acting)	16 August 1955	3 November 1955
Postmaster General	Hugues Lapointe	3 November 1955	21 June 1957
President of the Queen's Privy Council	Louis St. Laurent	15 November 1948	25 April 1957
President of the Queen's Privy Council	Lionel Chevrier	25 April 1957	21 June 1957
Minister of Public Works	Alphonse Fournier	15 November 1948	12 June 1953
Minister of Public Works	Walter Harris	12 June 1953	17 September 1953
Minister of Public Works	Robert Winters	17 September 1953	21 June 1957
Minister of Reconstruction and Supply	Robert Winters	15 November 1948	18 January 1950
Minister of Resources and Development	Robert Winters	18 January 1950	17 September 1953
Minister of Resources and Development	Jean Lesage	17 September 1953	16 December 1953
Secretary of State for Canada and Registrar General	Colin W. G. Gibson	15 November 1948	1 April 1949
Secretary of State for Canada and Registrar General	Frederick Gordon Bradley	1 April 1949	12 June 1953
Secretary of State for Canada and Registrar General	Jack Pickersgill	12 June 1953	1 July 1954
Secretary of State for Canada and Registrar General	Roch Pinard	1 July 1954	21 June 1957
Solicitor General	Joseph Jean	15 November 1948	25 August 1949
Solicitor General	Hugues Lapointe	25 August 1949	7 August 1950
Solicitor General	Stuart Garson	7 August 1950	15 October 1952
Solicitor General	Ralph Campney	15 October 1952	12 January 1954
Solicitor General	William Ross Macdonald	12 January 1954	21 June 1957
Minister of Trade and Commerce	C. D. Howe	15 November 1948	21 June 1957
Minister of Transport	Lionel Chevrier	15 November 1948	1 July 1954
Minister of Transport	George Carlyle Marler	1 July 1954	21 June 1957
Minister of Veterans Affairs	Milton Fowler Gregg	15 November 1948	7 August 1950
Minister of Veterans Affairs	Hugues Lapointe	7 August 1950	21 June 1957
Minister without Portfolio	Wishart McLea Robertson	15 November 1948	14 October 1953
Minister without Portfolio	James Angus MacKinnon	1 April 1949	14 December 1950
Minister without Portfolio	William Ross Macdonald	14 October 1953	12 January 1954

== Succession ==
Ministries of Canada
Preceded by 16th Canadian Ministry	17th Canadian Ministry; 1948–1957	Succeeded by 18th Canadian Ministry
