= 18th Canadian Ministry =

Government cabinet of Canada (1957–1963)

18th Canadian Ministry 18e conseil des ministres du Canada
- 18th ministry of Canada

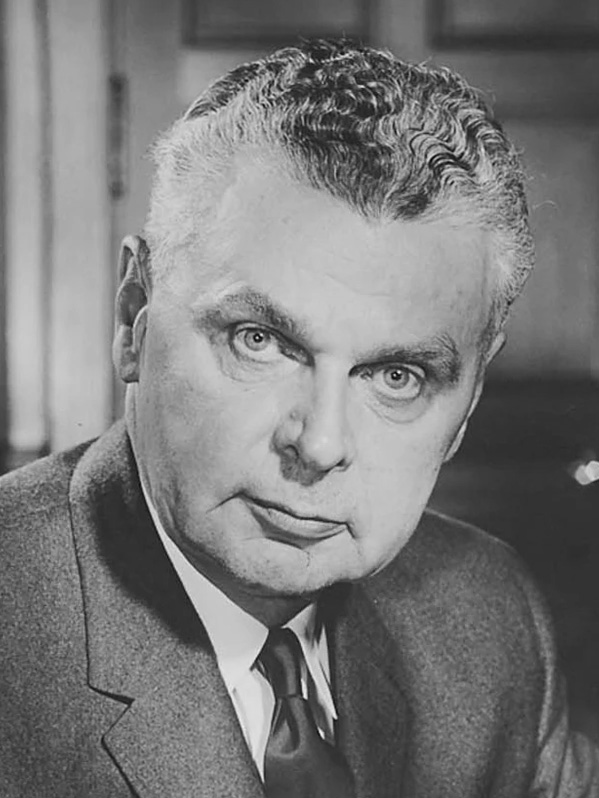
- Date formed: 21 June 1957
- Date dissolved: 22 April 1963

People and organizations
- Monarch: Elizabeth II
- Governor General: Vincent Massey (1957–1959); Georges Vanier (1959–1963)
- Prime Minister: John Diefenbaker
- Member party: Progressive Conservative
- Status in legislature: Minority (1957–1958); Majority (1958–1962); Minority (1962–1963)
- Opposition party: Liberal
- Opposition leader: Louis St. Laurent (1957–1958); Lester B. Pearson (1958–1963)

History
- Incoming formation: 1957 federal election
- Outgoing formation: 1963 federal election
- Elections: 1957, 1958, 1962
- Legislature terms: 23rd Canadian Parliament; 24th Canadian Parliament; 25th Canadian Parliament
- Predecessor: 17th Canadian Ministry
- Successor: 19th Canadian Ministry

The Eighteenth Canadian Ministry was the cabinet chaired by Prime Minister John Diefenbaker. It governed Canada from 21 June 1957 to 22 April 1963, including all of the 23rd, 24th, and 25th Canadian Parliaments. The government was formed by the Progressive Conservative Party of Canada.

== Ministers ==
Portfolio	Minister	Term	
Portfolio	Minister	Start	End
Prime Minister	John Diefenbaker	21 June 1957	22 April 1963
Minister of Agriculture	Douglas Harkness	21 June 1957	11 October 1960
Minister of Agriculture	Alvin Hamilton	11 October 1960	22 April 1963
Minister of Amateur Sport	Jay Monteith	29 September 1961	22 April 1963
Minister for Canada Mortgage and Housing Corporation	Howard Charles Green	21 June 1957	20 August 1959
Minister for Canada Mortgage and Housing Corporation	David James Walker	20 August 1959	18 July 1962
Minister for Canada Mortgage and Housing Corporation	Howard Charles Green (acting)	18 July 1962	9 August 1962
Minister for Canada Mortgage and Housing Corporation	Davie Fulton	9 August 1962	22 April 1963
Minister for the Canadian Wheat Board	Gordon Churchill	21 June 1957	11 October 1960
Minister for the Canadian Wheat Board	Alvin Hamilton	11 October 1960	22 April 1963
Minister of Citizenship and Immigration	Davie Fulton (acting)	21 June 1957	12 May 1958
Minister of Citizenship and Immigration	Ellen Fairclough	12 May 1958	9 August 1962
Minister of Citizenship and Immigration	Dick Bell	9 August 1962	22 April 1963
Minister for Defence Construction Limited	Howard Charles Green (acting)	21 June 1957	12 May 1958
Minister for Defence Construction Limited	Raymond O'Hurley	12 May 1958	22 April 1963
Minister of Defence Production	Howard Charles Green (acting)	21 June 1957	12 May 1958
Minister of Defence Production	Raymond O'Hurley	12 May 1958	22 April 1963
Secretary of State for External Affairs	John Diefenbaker	21 June 1957	13 September 1957
Secretary of State for External Affairs	Sidney Earle Smith	13 September 1957	17 March 1959
Secretary of State for External Affairs	John Diefenbaker (acting)	17 March 1959	4 June 1959
Secretary of State for External Affairs	Howard Charles Green	4 June 1959	22 April 1963
Minister of Finance and Receiver General	Donald Fleming	21 June 1957	9 August 1962
Minister of Finance and Receiver General	George Nowlan	9 August 1962	22 April 1963
Minister of Fisheries	Angus MacLean	21 June 1957	22 April 1963
Minister of Forestry	Hugh John Flemming	11 October 1960	18 March 1963
Minister of Forestry	Martial Asselin	18 March 1963	22 April 1963
Minister responsible for Indian Affairs	Davie Fulton (acting)	21 June 1957	12 May 1958
Minister responsible for Indian Affairs	Ellen Fairclough	12 May 1958	9 August 1962
Minister responsible for Indian Affairs	Dick Bell	9 August 1962	22 April 1963
Minister of Justice and Attorney General	Davie Fulton	21 June 1957	9 August 1962
Minister of Justice and Attorney General	Donald Fleming	9 August 1962	22 April 1963
Minister of Labour	Michael Starr	21 June 1957	22 April 1963
Leader of the Government in the House of Commons	Howard Charles Green	21 June 1957	14 January 1960
Leader of the Government in the House of Commons	Gordon Churchill	14 January 1960	22 April 1963
Leader of the Government in the Senate	John Thomas Haig	21 June 1957	12 May 1958
Minister of Mines and Technical Surveys	Léon Balcer (acting)	21 June 1957	7 August 1957
Minister of Mines and Technical Surveys	Paul Comtois	7 August 1957	6 October 1961
Minister of Mines and Technical Surveys	Walter Dinsdale (acting)	6 October 1961	28 December 1961
Minister of Mines and Technical Surveys	Jacques Flynn	28 December 1961	18 July 1962
Minister of Mines and Technical Surveys	Hugh John Flemming (acting)	18 July 1962	9 August 1962
Minister of Mines and Technical Surveys	Paul Martineau	9 August 1962	22 April 1963
Minister for National Capital Commission	David James Walker	20 August 1959	18 July 1962
Minister for National Capital Commission	Howard Charles Green (acting)	18 July 1962	9 August 1962
Minister for National Capital Commission	Davie Fulton	9 August 1962	22 April 1963
Associate Minister of National Defence	Vacant	21 June 1957	20 August 1959
Associate Minister of National Defence	Pierre Sévigny	20 August 1959	8 February 1963
Associate Minister of National Defence	Vacant	8 February 1963	22 April 1963
Minister of National Defence	George Pearkes	21 June 1957	11 October 1960
Minister of National Defence	Douglas Harkness	11 October 1960	4 February 1963
Minister of National Defence	Vacant (Elgin B. Armstrong was acting)	4 February 1963	12 February 1963
Minister of National Defence	Gordon Churchill	12 February 1963	22 April 1963
Minister of National Health and Welfare	Alfred Johnson Brooks (acting)	21 June 1957	22 August 1957
Minister of National Health and Welfare	Jay Monteith	22 August 1957	22 April 1963
Minister of National Revenue	George Nowlan	21 June 1957	9 August 1962
Minister of National Revenue	Hugh John Flemming	9 August 1962	22 April 1963
Minister of Northern Affairs and National Resources	Douglas Harkness	21 June 1957	22 August 1957
Minister of Northern Affairs and National Resources	Alvin Hamilton	22 August 1957	11 October 1960
Minister of Northern Affairs and National Resources	Walter Dinsdale	11 October 1960	22 April 1963
Postmaster General	William McLean Hamilton	21 June 1957	18 July 1962
Postmaster General	Angus MacLean (acting)	18 July 1962	9 August 1962
Postmaster General	Ellen Fairclough	9 August 1962	22 April 1963
President of the Queen's Privy Council	John Diefenbaker	21 June 1957	28 December 1961
President of the Queen's Privy Council	Noël Dorion	28 December 1961	5 July 1962
President of the Queen's Privy Council	John Diefenbaker (acting)	5 July 1962	21 December 1962
President of the Queen's Privy Council	John Diefenbaker	21 December 1962	22 April 1963
Minister of Public Works	Howard Charles Green	21 June 1957	20 August 1959
Minister of Public Works	David James Walker	20 August 1959	18 July 1962
Minister of Public Works	Howard Charles Green (acting)	18 July 1962	9 August 1962
Minister of Public Works	Davie Fulton	9 August 1962	22 April 1963
Secretary of State for Canada and Registrar General	Ellen Fairclough	21 June 1957	12 May 1958
Secretary of State for Canada and Registrar General	Henri Courtemanche	12 May 1958	19 January 1960
Secretary of State for Canada and Registrar General	Léon Balcer (acting)	19 January 1960	11 October 1960
Secretary of State for Canada and Registrar General	Noël Dorion	11 October 1960	5 July 1962
Secretary of State for Canada and Registrar General	Léon Balcer (acting)	5 July 1962	9 August 1962
Secretary of State for Canada and Registrar General	Ernest Halpenny	9 August 1962	22 April 1963
Solicitor General	Léon Balcer	21 June 1957	11 October 1960
Solicitor General	William Joseph Browne	11 October 1960	9 August 1962
Solicitor General	Vacant	9 August 1962	22 April 1963
Minister of Trade and Commerce	Gordon Churchill	21 June 1957	11 October 1960
Minister of Trade and Commerce	George Hees	11 October 1960	8 February 1963
Minister of Trade and Commerce	Vacant (James Alan Roberts was acting)	8 February 1963	12 February 1963
Minister of Trade and Commerce	Malcolm Wallace McCutcheon	12 February 1963	22 April 1963
Minister of Transport	George Hees	21 June 1957	11 October 1960
Minister of Transport	Léon Balcer	11 October 1960	22 April 1963
Minister of Veterans Affairs	Alfred Johnson Brooks	21 June 1957	11 October 1960
Minister of Veterans Affairs	Gordon Churchill	11 October 1960	12 February 1963
Minister of Veterans Affairs	Marcel Lambert	12 February 1963	22 April 1963
Minister without Portfolio	William Joseph Browne	21 June 1957	11 October 1960
Minister without Portfolio	James Macdonnell	21 June 1957	20 August 1959
Minister without Portfolio	John Thomas Haig	9 October 1957	11 May 1958
Minister without Portfolio	Ernest Halpenny	11 October 1960	9 August 1962
Minister without Portfolio	Malcolm Wallace McCutcheon	9 August 1962	12 February 1963
Minister without Portfolio	Frank Charles McGee	18 March 1963	22 April 1963
Minister without Portfolio	Théogène Ricard	18 March 1963	22 April 1963
Offices not of the Cabinet
Leader of the Government in the Senate	Walter Aseltine	12 May 1958	31 August 1962
Leader of the Government in the Senate	Alfred Johnson Brooks	31 August 1962	22 April 1963

Ministries of Canada
Preceded by 17th Canadian Ministry	18th Canadian Ministry; 1957–1963	Succeeded by 19th Canadian Ministry
