= Minister of Mines and Resources =

Former Canadian cabinet position

Minister of Mines and Resources of Canada
- Member of: Cabinet of Canada
- Constituting instrument: Statute 1 Edw. VIII, c. 33
- Formation: 1 December 1936
- Abolished: 18 January 1950

In Canada, the position of minister of mines and resources was a cabinet portfolio in Canada from 1936 to 1950. The mines portfolio had previously been that of the Minister of Mines, which was a portfolio adjunct to other ministries such as Inland Revenue and Indian Affairs.

Upon their abolition, the responsibilities belonging to the offices of Minister of Immigration and Colonization, Minister of the Interior, Minister of Mines, and Superintendent-General of Indian Affairs were combined into the office of Minister of Mines and Resources, created by Statute 1 Edw. VIII, c. 33, assented to on 23 June 1936 and proclaimed in force on 1 December 1936. The last Minister of Immigration and Colonization, Thomas Alexander Crerar, remained in office under the new title of Minister of Mines and Resources.

Both the offices of Minister of Mines and Resources and Minister of Reconstruction and Supply were abolished by Statute 13 Geo. VI, c. 18, and the offices of the Minister of Citizenship and Immigration, Minister of Mines and Technical Surveys and Minister of Resources and Development were thus created by Statutes 13 Geo. VI, c. 16, 17 and 18 respectively, each assenting to on 10 December 1949 and proclaimed in force on 18 January 1950.

The office portfolio was superseded in 1950 by the Minister of Mines and Technical Surveys, combining in a department which had previously been associated with the Ministry of Lands. The current successor to the "Resources" portfolio is the Minister of Natural Resources.

== Ministers of Mines and Resources ==
1.	Thomas Alexander Crerar	Cabinet of King	December 1, 1936 – April 17, 1945
2.	James Allison Glen	Cabinet of King	April 18, 1945 – June 10, 1948
3.	James Angus MacKinnon	Cabinet of King	June 11, 1948 – November 15, 1948
	James Angus MacKinnon	Cabinet of St. Laurent	November 15, 1948 – March 31, 1949
4.	Colin William George Gibson	Cabinet of St. Laurent	April 1, 1949 – January 17, 1950
