= Minister of Justice and Attorney General of Canada =

Canadian Cabinet minister; main legal advisor to the government

Minister of Justice Attorney General of Canada
- Ministre de la Justice procureur général du Canada
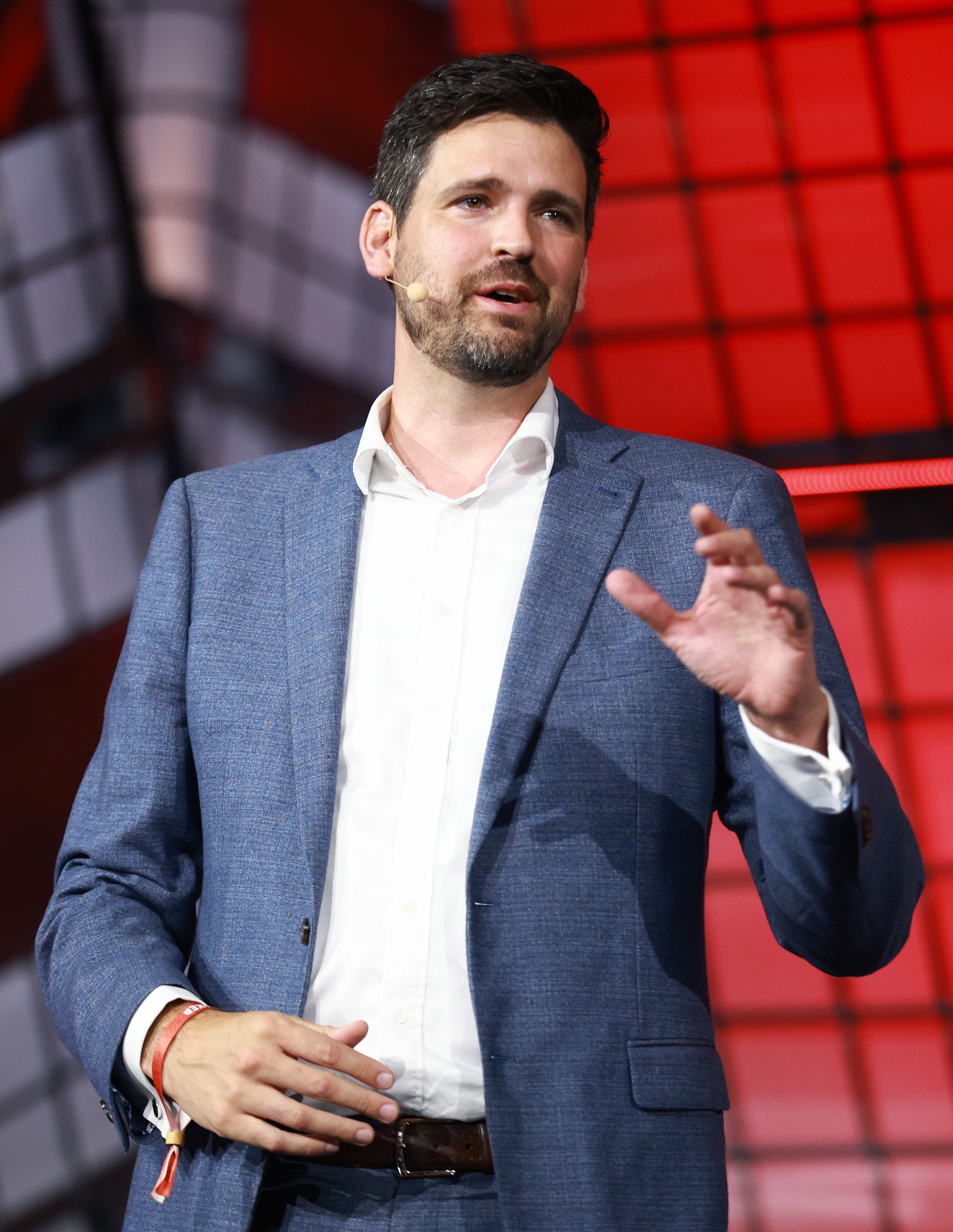
- Incumbent; Sean Fraser since May 13, 2025
- Department of Justice
- Style: The Honourable
- Abbreviation: MoJAG
- Member of: Parliament; Privy Council; Cabinet
- Reports to: Parliament; Prime Minister
- Appointer: Monarch (represented by the governor general); on the advice of the prime minister
- Term length: At His Majesty's pleasure
- Inaugural holder: Sir John A. Macdonald
- Formation: July 1, 1867
- Salary: CA$299,900 (2024)
- Website: canada.justice.gc.ca

The minister of justice and attorney general of Canada (French: ministre de la justice et procureur général du Canada) is a dual-role portfolio in the Canadian Cabinet.

The officeholder in the role of Minister of Justice (Ministre de la Justice) serves as the minister of the Crown responsible for the Department of Justice and the justice portfolio, and in the role of Attorney General (Procureur général), litigates on behalf of the Crown and serves as the chief legal advisor to the Government of Canada. (Though most prosecution functions of the attorney general have been assigned to the Public Prosecution Service of Canada. The attorney general is supported in this role by the director of public prosecutions, who acts as deputy attorney general for the purpose of these functions.)

== Attorney General of Canada ==
The role was created in 1867 to replace the attorney general of Canada West and attorney general of Canada East.

As the top prosecuting officer in Canada, 'attorney general' is a separate title held by the minister of justice—a member of the Cabinet. The minister of justice is concerned with questions of policy and their relationship to the justice system. In their role as attorney general, they are the chief law officer of the Crown. The roles have been connected since confederation. As a result of controversy, following the SNC-Lavalin affair, Anne McLellan was appointed to review the roles and prepare a report on whether they should be separated. She recommended the positions remain combined.

This cabinet position is usually reserved for someone holding a legal qualification. There have been exceptions: Joe Clark only studied the first year of law at Dalhousie University before transferring to University of British Columbia Faculty of Law and dropping out to embark on political life.

This cabinet portfolio has been held by many individuals who went on to become prime minister including John Sparrow David Thompson, R. B. Bennett, Louis St Laurent, Pierre Elliott Trudeau, John Turner, Kim Campbell and Jean Chrétien (Clark became MoJAG after his time as prime minister). This is the only Canadian Ministry (other than that of the prime minister) which has not been reorganized since its creation in 1867.

A separate cabinet position, the minister of public safety (formerly known as the "solicitor general") administers the law enforcement agencies (police, prisons, and security) of the federal government.

The Attorney General is usually appointed a King's Counsel.

== Ministers of justice and attorneys general ==
Key:

Liberal Party of Canada
Historical conservative parties: Liberal-Conservative, Conservative (historical), Unionist, National Liberal and Conservative, Progressive Conservative
Conservative Party of Canada

No.	Portrait	Name	Term of office		Political party	Ministry
1		Sir John A. Macdonald	July 1, 1867	November 5, 1873	Liberal-Conservative	1 (Macdonald)
2		Antoine-Aimé Dorion	November 7, 1873	May 31, 1874	Liberal	2 (Mackenzie)
–		Sir Albert James Smith (Acting)	June 1, 1874	July 7, 1874	Liberal	2 (Mackenzie)
3		Télesphore Fournier	July 8, 1874	May 18, 1875	Liberal	2 (Mackenzie)
4		Edward Blake	May 19, 1875	June 7, 1877	Liberal	2 (Mackenzie)
5		Rodolphe Laflamme	June 8, 1877	October 8, 1878	Liberal	2 (Mackenzie)
6		James McDonald	October 17, 1878	May 18, 1881	Conservative (historical)	3 (Macdonald)
7		Alexander Campbell	May 20, 1881	September 24, 1885	Conservative (historical)	3 (Macdonald)
8		Sir John Thompson	September 26, 1885	June 6, 1891	Conservative (historical)	3 (Macdonald)
8		Sir John Thompson	June 16, 1891	November 24, 1892	Conservative (historical)	4 (Abbott)
8		Sir John Thompson	December 5, 1892	December 12, 1894	Conservative (historical)	5 (Thompson)
9		Sir Charles Hibbert Tupper	December 21, 1894	January 5, 1896	Conservative (historical)	6 (Bowell)
–		Thomas Mayne Daly (Acting)	January 6, 1896	January 14, 1896	Liberal-Conservative	6 (Bowell)
10		Arthur Rupert Dickey	January 15, 1896	April 27, 1896	Conservative (historical)	6 (Bowell)
10		Arthur Rupert Dickey	May 1, 1896	July 8, 1896	Conservative (historical)	7 (Tupper)
11		Sir Oliver Mowat	July 13, 1896	November 17, 1897	Liberal	8 (Laurier)
12		David Mills	November 18, 1897	February 7, 1902	Liberal	8 (Laurier)
13		Charles Fitzpatrick	February 11, 1902	June 3, 1906	Liberal	8 (Laurier)
14		Sir Allen Aylesworth	June 4, 1906	October 6, 1911	Liberal	8 (Laurier)
15		Charles Doherty	October 10, 1911	July 9, 1920	Conservative (historical)	9•10 (Borden)
15		Charles Doherty	July 10, 1920	September 20, 1921	Conservative (historical)	11 (Meighen)
16		R. B. Bennett	October 4, 1921	December 28, 1921	Conservative (historical)	11 (Meighen)
17		Lomer Gouin	December 29, 1921	January 3, 1924	Liberal	12 (King)
18		Ernest Lapointe (1st time)	January 4, 1924 (Acting until Jan.30)	June 28, 1926	Liberal	12 (King)
–		Hugh Guthrie (Acting)	June 29, 1926	July 12, 1926	Conservative (historical)	13 (Meighen)
19		Esioff-Léon Patenaude	July 13, 1926	September 24, 1926	Conservative (historical)	13 (Meighen)
(18)		Ernest Lapointe (2nd time)	September 25, 1926	August 6, 1930	Liberal	14 (King)
20		Hugh Guthrie	August 7, 1930	August 11, 1935	Conservative (historical)	15 (Bennett)
21		George Reginald Geary	August 14, 1935	October 22, 1935	Conservative (historical)	15 (Bennett)
(18)		Ernest Lapointe (3rd time)	October 23, 1935	November 26, 1941	Liberal	16 (King)
–		Joseph-Enoil Michaud (Acting)	November 27, 1941	December 9, 1941	Liberal	16 (King)
22		Louis St. Laurent (1st time)	December 10, 1941	December 9, 1946	Liberal	16 (King)
23		James Lorimer Ilsley	December 10, 1946	June 30, 1948	Liberal	16 (King)
(22)		Louis St. Laurent (2nd time)	July 1, 1948 (Acting until Sep.10)	November 14, 1948	Liberal	16 (King)
24		Stuart Garson	November 15, 1948	June 20, 1957	Liberal	17 (St. Laurent)
25		Davie Fulton	June 21, 1957	August 8, 1962	Progressive Conservative	18 (Diefenbaker)
26		Donald Fleming	August 9, 1962	April 21, 1963	Progressive Conservative	18 (Diefenbaker)
27		Lionel Chevrier	April 22, 1963	February 2, 1964	Liberal	19 (Pearson)
28		Guy Favreau	February 3, 1964	June 29, 1965	Liberal	19 (Pearson)
–		George McIlraith (Acting)	June 30, 1965	July 6, 1965	Liberal	19 (Pearson)
29		Lucien Cardin	July 7, 1965	April 3, 1967	Liberal	19 (Pearson)
30		Pierre Trudeau	April 4, 1967	April 19, 1968	Liberal	19 (Pearson)
30		Pierre Trudeau	April 20, 1968	July 5, 1968	Liberal	20 (P. E. Trudeau)
31		John Turner	July 6, 1968	January 27, 1972	Liberal	20 (P. E. Trudeau)
32		Otto Lang (1st time)	January 28, 1972	September 25, 1975	Liberal	20 (P. E. Trudeau)
33		Ron Basford	September 26, 1975	August 2, 1978	Liberal	20 (P. E. Trudeau)
(32)		Otto Lang (2nd time)	August 3, 1978 (Acting until Aug.9)	November 23, 1978	Liberal	20 (P. E. Trudeau)
34		Marc Lalonde	November 24, 1978	June 3, 1979	Liberal	20 (P. E. Trudeau)
35		Jacques Flynn	June 4, 1979	March 2, 1980	Progressive Conservative	21 (Clark)
36		Jean Chrétien	March 3, 1980	September 9, 1982	Liberal	22 (P. E. Trudeau)
37		Mark MacGuigan	September 10, 1982	June 29, 1984	Liberal	22 (P. E. Trudeau)
38		Donald Johnston	June 30, 1984	September 16, 1984	Liberal	23 (Turner)
39		John Crosbie	September 17, 1984	June 29, 1986	Progressive Conservative	24 (Mulroney)
40		Ray Hnatyshyn	June 30, 1986	December 7, 1988	Progressive Conservative	24 (Mulroney)
–		Joe Clark (Acting)	December 8, 1988	January 29, 1989	Progressive Conservative	24 (Mulroney)
41		Doug Lewis	January 30, 1989	February 22, 1990	Progressive Conservative	24 (Mulroney)
42		Kim Campbell	February 23, 1990	January 3, 1993	Progressive Conservative	24 (Mulroney)
43		Pierre Blais	January 4, 1993	June 24, 1993	Progressive Conservative	24 (Mulroney)
43		Pierre Blais	June 25, 1993	November 3, 1993	Progressive Conservative	25 (Campbell)
44		Allan Rock	November 4, 1993	June 10, 1997	Liberal	26 (Chrétien)
45		Anne McLellan	June 11, 1997	January 14, 2002	Liberal	26 (Chrétien)
46		Martin Cauchon	January 15, 2002	December 11, 2003	Liberal	26 (Chrétien)
47		Irwin Cotler	December 12, 2003	February 5, 2006	Liberal	27 (Martin)
48		Vic Toews	February 6, 2006	January 3, 2007	Conservative	28 (Harper)
49		Rob Nicholson	January 4, 2007	July 13, 2013	Conservative	28 (Harper)
50		Peter MacKay	July 13, 2013	November 4, 2015	Conservative	28 (Harper)
51		Jody Wilson-Raybould	November 4, 2015	January 14, 2019	Liberal	29 (J. Trudeau)
52		David Lametti	January 14, 2019	July 26, 2023	Liberal	29 (J. Trudeau)
53		Arif Virani	July 26, 2023	March 14, 2025	Liberal	29 (J. Trudeau)
54		Gary Anandasangaree	March 14, 2025	May 13, 2025	Liberal	30 (Carney)
55		Sean Fraser	May 13, 2025	Incumbent	Liberal	30 (Carney)

== See also ==
- Alberta Minister of Justice and Attorney General
- Attorney General of British Columbia
- Minister of Justice and Attorney General (Manitoba)
- Office of the Attorney General (New Brunswick)
- Minister of Justice and Public Safety and Attorney General of Newfoundland and Labrador
- Minister of Justice of the Northwest Territories
- Attorney General and Minister of Justice of Nova Scotia
- Minister of Justice of Nunavut
- Attorney General of Ontario
- Minister of Justice and Public Safety and Attorney General of Prince Edward Island
- Ministry of Justice (Quebec) (also as attorney general)
- Minister of Justice and Attorney General of Saskatchewan
- Minister of Justice (Yukon)
- Named Persons v. Attorney General of Canada

Historical roles

- Attorney General of Upper Canada
- Attorney General of Lower Canada
