= Named Persons v. Attorney General of Canada =

June 2022 Canadian court case

- Court: Supreme Court of British Columbia
- Started: June 2022
- Decided: Unknown

Named Persons v. Attorney General of Canada was a June 2022 civil court case that was heard in the Supreme Court of British Columbia in which an anonymous person sued the Attorney General of Canada. The court kept the documents of the case under seal, and held the trial in camera. Canadian newspaper company Postmedia Network's legal challenges to report on the court case were rejected and the reasons for the rejection were not shared with Postmedia.

== Named Persons v. Attorney General of Canada ==
Named Persons v. Attorney General of Canada was a June 2022 civil court case heard in the Supreme Court of British Columbia in which an anonymous person sued the Attorney General of Canada. The six-week court case was presided over by Chief Justice Christopher Hinkson. Postmedia Network reporter Keith Fraser, who wished to report on the proceedings was advised by Hinkson that the court case would be heard in camera and the documentation for the case was under seal. Postmedia Network's enquiries made to the court seeking access to the documentation was rejected by the court.

== Postmedia Network response ==
Several days after the start of the case, Postmedia made legal arguments to permit reporting on Named Persons v. Attorney General of Canada; the arguments were dismissed by Justice Hinkson.

In October 2022, Postmedia appealed Hinkson's decision at the British Columbia Court of Appeal. The appeal was heard by Justice Robert Bauman, Justice David Frankel, and Justice Anne MacKenzie. Postmedia was informed that they lost the appeal in December 2022, with the appeal court not sharing an explanation with Postmedia Network for its judgement.

== See also ==
- Secret trial
