= Associate Minister of National Defence =

Canadian cabinet minister

Associate Minister of National Defence of Canada
- Ministre associé de la Défense nationale
- Incumbent; Jill McKnight since May 13, 2025
- Department of National Defence
- Style: The Honourable
- Member of: House of Commons; Privy Council; Cabinet
- Reports to: Parliament; Prime Minister
- Appointer: Monarch (represented by the governor general); on the advice of the prime minister
- Term length: At His Majesty's pleasure
- Inaugural holder: Charles Gavan Power
- Formation: July 12, 1940
- First holder: Charles Gavan Power
- Salary: CA$299,900 (2024)
- Website: www.forces.gc.ca

The associate minister of national defence (French: ministre associé de la défense nationale) is a member of the Canadian cabinet who is responsible for various files within the defence department as assigned by the prime minister or defence minister.

The position was created in 1940 during World War II under the War Measures Act along with the creation of a minister of defence for air and a minister of defence for naval services. These positions lapsed with the end of the war. The position of associate minister of defence was recreated in 1953 when the National Defence Act was amended to provide for the appointment in peacetime.

This post remained vacant under Prime Ministers Pierre Trudeau, Joe Clark and John Turner. Brian Mulroney revived the position but it was abolished under Kim Campbell when she decreased the size of the cabinet from 35 to 24 ministers. The post was also not used under Jean Chrétien.

This position reappeared on December 12, 2003, when Paul Martin chose his first cabinet and named Albina Guarnieri as the associate minister of national defence and minister of state for civil preparedness, and the portfolio passed to Mauril Bélanger in a subsequent reshuffle. Stephen Harper did not name anyone to the position until his May 18, 2011 reshuffle, when Julian Fantino was appointed to the portfolio. The position was left vacant by Harper in the July 15, 2013 cabinet shuffle.

Throughout the prime ministership of Justin Trudeau, the minister of veterans affairs was concurrently the associate minister of national defence. After a brief interruption during 2025, his successor Mark Carney resumed this practice.

== List of associate ministers of national defence ==
| Minister | Tenure | | Prime Minister |
|---|---|---|---|
| Charles Gavan Power | July 12, 1940 | November 26, 1944 | King (16) |
| vacant | November 27, 1944 | November 15, 1948 | King (16) |
| vacant | November 15, 1948 | February 11, 1953 | St-Laurent (17) |
| Ralph Osborne Campney | February 12, 1953 | June 30, 1954 | St-Laurent (17) |
| vacant | July 1, 1954 | April 26, 1957 | St-Laurent (17) |
| Paul Hellyer | April 27, 1957 | June 20, 1957 | St-Laurent (17) |
| vacant | June 21, 1957 | August 19, 1959 | Diefenbaker (18) |
| Pierre Sévigny | August 20, 1959 | February 8, 1963 | Diefenbaker (18) |
| vacant | February 9, 1963 | April 21, 1963 | Diefenbaker (18) |
| Lucien Cardin | April 22, 1963 | February 14, 1965 | Pearson (19) |
| Léo Cadieux | February 15, 1965 | September 18, 1967 | Pearson (19) |
| vacant | September 19, 1967 | April 20, 1968 | Pearson (19) |
| vacant | April 20, 1968 | June 3, 1979 | P.E. Trudeau (20) |
| vacant | June 4, 1979 | March 2, 1980 | Clark (21) |
| vacant | March 3, 1980 | June 29, 1984 | P.E. Trudeau (22) |
| vacant | June 30, 1984 | September 16, 1984 | Turner (23) |
| vacant | September 17, 1984 | August 19, 1985 | Mulroney (24) |
| Harvie Andre | August 20, 1985 | June 29, 1986 | Mulroney (24) |
| Paul Dick | June 30, 1986 | June 29, 1989 | Mulroney (24) |
| Mary Collins | June 30, 1986 | January 3, 1993 | Mulroney (24) |
| vacant | January 4, 1993 | June 24, 1993 | Mulroney (24) |
| vacant | June 25, 1993 | November 3, 1993 | Campbell (25) |
| vacant | November 4, 1993 | December 11, 2003 | Chrétien (26) |
| Albina Guarnieri | December 12, 2003 | July 20, 2004 | Martin (27) |
| Mauril Bélanger | July 20, 2004 | February 6, 2006 | Martin (27) |
| vacant | February 6, 2006 | May 18, 2011 | Harper (28) |
| Julian Fantino | May 18, 2011 | July 4, 2012 | Harper (28) |
| Bernard Valcourt | July 4, 2012 | February 22, 2013 | Harper (28) |
| Kerry-Lynne Findlay | February 22, 2013 | July 15, 2013 | Harper (28) |
| vacant | July 15, 2013 | January 5, 2015 | Harper (28) |
| Julian Fantino | January 5, 2015 | November 3, 2015 | Harper (28) |
| Kent Hehr | November 4, 2015 | August 28, 2017 | J. Trudeau (29) |
| Seamus O'Regan | August 28, 2017 | January 14, 2019 | J. Trudeau (29) |
| Jody Wilson-Raybould | January 14, 2019 | February 12, 2019 | J. Trudeau (29) |
| vacant | February 12, 2019 | March 1, 2019 | J. Trudeau (29) |
| Lawrence MacAulay | March 1, 2019 | July 26, 2023 | J. Trudeau (29) |
| Ginette Petitpas Taylor | July 26, 2023 | December 20, 2024 | J. Trudeau (29) |
| Darren Fisher | December 20, 2024 | March 14, 2025 | J. Trudeau (29) |
| vacant | March 14, 2025 | May 13, 2025 | Carney (30) |
| Jill McKnight | May 13, 2025 | | Carney (30) |

Cadieux and Hellyer were later appointed as minister of national defence.
