= Recognition and Implementation of Indigenous Rights Framework =

Recognition and Implementation of Indigenous Rights Framework (RIIRF) is a legislation and policy initiative intended to be undertaken in "full partnership with First Nations, Inuit, and Métis Peoples" that was announced during a speech in the House of Commons of Canada by Prime Minister, Justin Trudeau on February 14, 2018. It was "meant to enshrine the Constitution's section 35, which affirms Aboriginal rights, in federal law, allowing First Nations to reconstitute their governance structures outside the Indian Act."

== Objectives ==
The framework is intended to "enshrine Section 35 of the Constitution Act, 1982— which affirms Indigenous rights — in federal law" and to "fill the gap between federal government policies and multiple court decisions on Indigenous rights."

According to the Overview published by the AFN in September 2018, the framework will "[c]reate new tools and mechanisms for supporting self-determination through both law and policy, [s]upport distinctions-based approaches for First Nations, Inuit and Métis, [a]dvance the implementation of treaties and agreements, [s]upport new approaches to the evolution of treaties and agreements, and [k]eep the Government of Canada accountable." The overview also noted that the framework will not "[d]efine and limit the rights of Indigenous Peoples, [c]reate municipal-style governments, [i]nfringe on provincial or territorial jurisdiction, [a]lter, without the agreement of the parties, any treaties, agreements or arrangements concluded under existing policies, or tables currently operating under existing policies, [p]reclude Indigenous peoples from pursuing other opportunities to advance their priorities, [e]xtinguish rights or seek the cession, release or surrender of rights, or [i]mpose solutions."

== Engagement ==
In December 2015, Prime Minister Justin Trudeau told the Assembly of First Nations (AFN) that he was "open to repealing laws unilaterally imposed on them". According to an article in iPolitics, he said, "Where measures are found to be in conflict with your rights, where they are inconsistent with the principles of good governance, or where they simply make no public policy sense, we will rescind them."

By June 2016, Indigenous and Northern Affairs Canada (INAC) held about twenty "exploratory tables" with "indigenous leaders on potential self-government and land agreements.

On February 14, 2018, during a speech in the House of Commons, Trudeau announced the formation of the Recognition and Implementation of Indigenous Rights Framework (RIIRF) which would be undertaken in "full partnership with First Nations, Inuit, and Métis Peoples".

From March through June 2018, the Crown-Indigenous Relations Canada (CIRC) conducted 89 engagement sessions "from coast to coast to coast that gathered input from over 1,300 participants". On July 12, 2018 Crown-Indigenous Relations Canada (CIRC) officials released a draft discussion paper, " What we heard so far on the recognition and implementation of Indigenous rights" as part of the ongoing process. According to CBC News, the paper was widely panned by First Nations leaders as "insulting." In "late August, high-profile First Nations leaders and legal experts" contacted Trudeau in writing to ask for a change in the way in which Minister of Crown–Indigenous Relations, Carolyn Bennett, was handling the co-development process for the framework.

The AFN held a Policy Forum entitled "Affirming First Nations Rights, Title and Jurisdiction" on September 11 and 12, 2018, to discuss the framework. The forum "turned disastrous" and faced a "nascent organized resistance that echoed the early days of the Idle No More movement." AFN National Chief Perry Bellegarde said in a September 11 speech during a forum to discuss the framework, that the Trudeau government, which wanted to introduce the framework by the fall, needed to slow down the process.

By September 2018, according to Clerk of the Privy Council Michael Wernick, who is the "lead on the Indigenous framework file", Trudeau expressed concerns at the "slow pace of work" which he had hoped to introduce in the fall of 2018.

== Background ==
There have been a series of reports and commissions, such as the "Report on the Royal Commission on Aboriginal Peoples (1996), the Penner Report (1983), (Note: The Penner Report by the Special Parliamentary Committee on Indian Self-Government, chaired by Liberal MP Keith Penner, recommended the phasing out of the Indian Act and the Department of Indian Affairs and the introduction of Native self-government. In 1984, with Brian Mulroney as Prime Minister, the Report was dismissed.) the Truth and Reconciliation Commission (Canada) Calls to Action (2015), the Principles Respecting the Government of Canada’s Relationship with Indigenous Peoples (2017), Recognition of Indigenous Rights and Self-Determination discussions, and the national engagement led by the Minister of Crown-Indigenous Relations", that confirm that "changes are needed to ensure that policies effectively respond to the needs and interests of Indigenous communities". Policies need to be aligned "with evolving laws and the United Nations Declaration on the Rights of Indigenous Peoples, including the concept of free, prior and informed consent."

In August, 2017, Prime Minister Justin Trudeau announced that the Department of Indigenous and Northern Affairs Canada (INAC) was being dismantled and replaced with two new departments: Crown-Indigenous Relations and Northern Affairs, and Indigenous Services.

In November 2017, the Government of Canada committed to supporting the implementation of Declaration on the Rights of Indigenous Peoples (UNDRIP), an "international human rights instrument that identifies rights of Indigenous peoples". The Liberal government's decided to "set up a law and policy review to ensure that all laws and policies in Canada align with Section 35, UNDRIP and what Mr. Fitz-Morris calls "our commitment to a new relationship." "On Dec. 6, [2018] then-Indigenous Services Minister Jane Philpott announced that First Nations with solid financial track records are now eligible for guaranteed 10-year funding." The Globe and Mail wrote that this is an admission on the part of the government that the "status quo for First Nations communities under the Indian Act has been hundreds of years of insecure and unstable funding."
