= Mining in Canada =

Overview of the mining industry in Canada

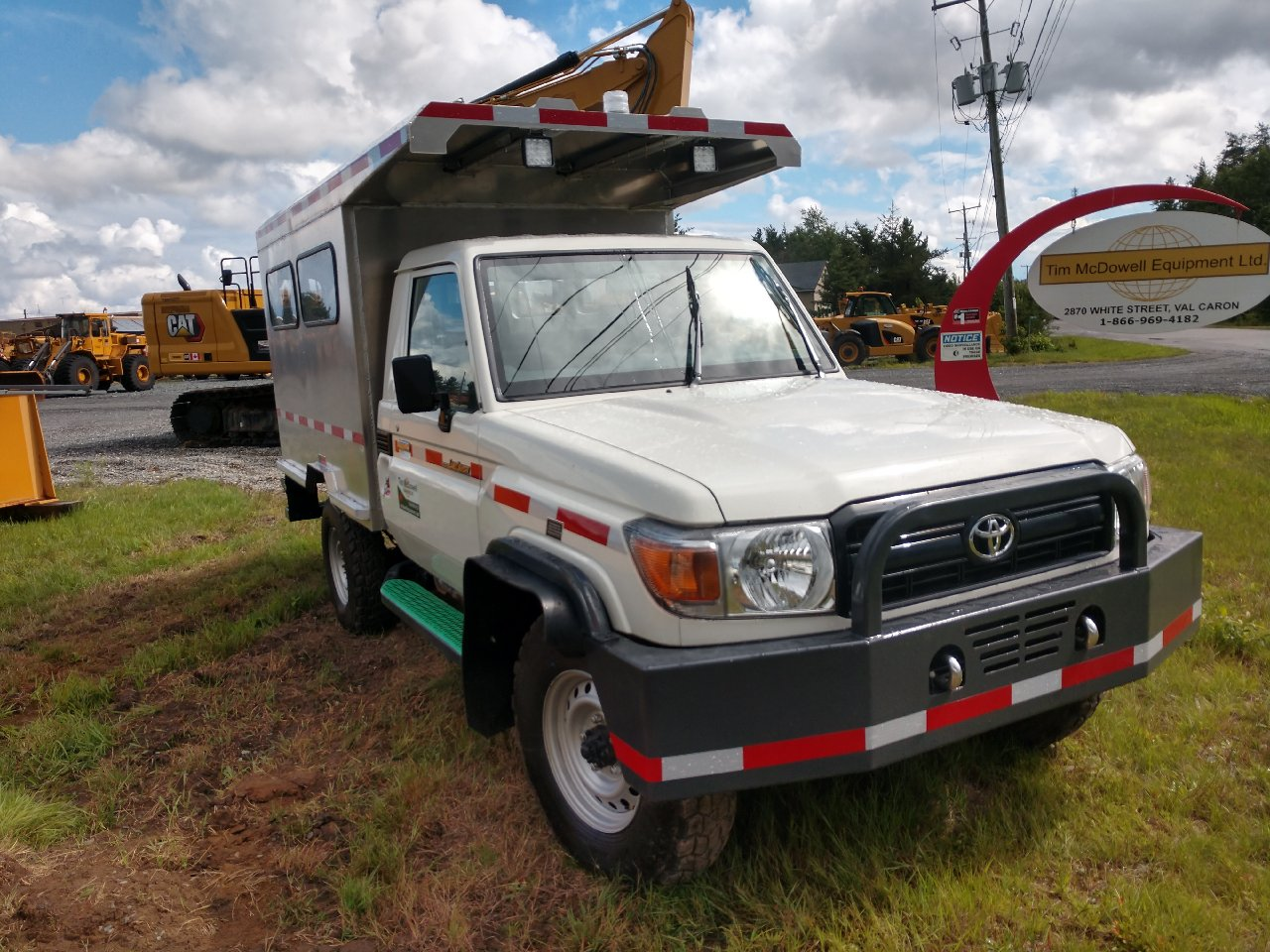
Toyota Land Cruiser (J70) used for mining purposes in Canada

Mining has been conducted on an industrial scale in present-day Canada since the late 18th century. The industry remains an important aspect of the economy of Canada to this day, particularly in the North, and Canadian-domiciled mining companies have increasingly expanded their operations globally.

== History ==
The history of mining in Canada goes back to the 16th century. In the 1570s, Martin Frobisher briefly attempted a mining operation on Baffin Island, although it was unsuccessful. In 1672, French settlers in Cape Breton Island detected coal deposits. Matonabbee and Samuel Hearne sought after copper in the Hudson Bay region in the 1770s.

The first truly industrial mining operation in what is now Canada was an iron mine at Forges du Saint-Maurice near Trois-Rivières in Quebec, which remained a going concern from 1738 to 1883. Copper mining in Bruce Mines, Ontario—the first industrial-scale mine of a substance other than iron—followed in 1848. The Canadian mining industry continued to expand nationwide through the 19th century, and became one of the world's largest by the 20th century, particularly following World War II.

Mills and Sweeney note that the staples thesis, which posits that the Canadian economy has developed primarily through the exploitation of the country's abundant natural resources, remains a viable model of Canadian political economy.

== Operations ==
In 2019, Canada was the 4th largest producer of platinum; the world's 5th largest producer of gold; the world's 5th largest producer of nickel; the world's 10th largest producer of copper; the 8th largest world producer of iron ore; the 4th largest world producer of titanium; the world's largest producer of potash; the 2nd largest world producer of niobium; the 4th largest world producer of sulfur; the world's 7th largest producer of molybdenum; the 7th worldwide producer of cobalt; the 8th largest world producer of lithium; the 8th largest world producer of zinc; the 13th largest world producer of gypsum; the 14th worldwide producer of antimony; the world's 10th largest producer of graphite; in addition to being the 6th largest world producer of salt. It was the 2nd largest producer in the world of uranium in 2018.

== Economic impact ==
=== Domestic ===
Mining is a significant part of the economy of Canada. As of 2018, mining revenues totalled CA$47 billion. In 2013, over 50% of the world's publicly listed exploration and mining companies were headquartered in Canada. Toronto is a financial centre for the mining industry: as of 2016, around 80 percent of the world's equity trades in mining stocks took place in Toronto's markets.

In 2021, Canada's GDP totaled to CA$1.8 trillion across all industries. $156.5 billion of this (7.9%) is due to mining. Mining's contribution to Canada's GDP is separated into extraction ($36.1 billion), services ($12 billion), primary manufacturing ($17.7 billion), and downstream manufacturing ($25 billion).

The Canadian mining industry has experienced significant volatility in recent history. The 1980s and 1990s saw a "prolonged slump" in Canadian mining, whereas the 2000s and 2010s were largely boom periods.

Saskatchewan alone produces approximately 15 percent of the world's uranium. The metal was first discovered in the province in the 1930s, and had become Canada's most valuable resource export by the 1950s. In Northern Canada, mining—particularly hardrock mining—has long been one of the most significant sources of economic development.

Canada taxes mining companies at a relatively low level by international standards. Alam identifies this as one way Canada has established itself an attractive place for mining companies to do business.

=== International ===
International expansion of the domestic mining industry has been championed by the government of Canada, and one scholar describes Canadian mining operations as having "developed an extensive and indeed dominant global presence". Canadian mining investment abroad has been particularly significant in Latin America and African countries.

== See also ==
- Mining Association of Canada
- Coal mining in Saskatchewan
- Gold mining in Canada
- Lists of mines in Canada
- Uranium mining in Canada
- Canadian mining in Latin America and the Caribbean

== Sources ==
- Alam, Shafiq (2011). "Mineral Resources in Canada—An Overview on Mining and Metal Recycling". Resources Processing. 58 (1): 3–8. doi:10.4144/rpsj.58.3. ISSN 1349-9262.
- Butler, Paula (2015). Colonial Extractions: Race and Canadian Mining in Contemporary Africa. University of Toronto Press. ISBN 9781442619951.
- Cranstone, Donald A. (2002). A History of Mining and Mineral Exploration in Canada and Outlook for the Future (PDF). Natural Resources Canada. ISBN 0-662-32680-6. OCLC 51736275.
- Keeling, Arn; Sandlos, John (November 2015). Keeling, Arn; Sandlos, John (eds.). Mining and Communities in Northern Canada: History, Politics, and Memory. doi:10.11575/PRISM/34601. hdl:1880/51021. ISBN 9781552388044.
- Lauzon, Jolane T. (2018). "Araya v. Nevsun Resources: Remedies for Victims of Human Rights Violations Committed by Canadian Mining Companies Abroad". Revue québécoise de droit international. 31 (1): 143–69. doi:10.7202/1065030ar. 2018 CanLIIDocs 10660 – via CanLII.
- Mills, Suzanne; Sweeney, Brendan (March 2013). "Employment Relations in the Neostaples Resource Economy: Impact Benefit Agreements and Aboriginal Governance in Canada's Nickel Mining Industry". Studies in Political Economy. 91 (1): 7–34. doi:10.1080/19187033.2013.11674980. ISSN 0707-8552. S2CID 153614206.
- Seck, Sarah L. (2011). "Canadian Mining Internationally and the UN Guiding Principles for Business and Human Rights". Canadian Yearbook of International Law. 49: 51–116. doi:10.1017/S0069005800010328. S2CID 155412368 – via HeinOnline.
