= Minister of Immigration, Refugees and Citizenship =

Minister in the Cabinet of Canada

- Ministre de l'Immigration, des Réfugiés et de la Citoyenneté
- Incumbent; Lena Diab since 13 May 2025
- Immigration, Refugees and Citizenship Canada
- Style: The Honourable
- Member of: House of Commons; Privy Council; Cabinet
- Reports to: Parliament; Prime Minister
- Appointer: Monarch (represented by the governor general); on the advice of the prime minister
- Term length: At His Majesty's pleasure
- Constituting instrument: Department of Citizenship and Immigration Act
- Precursor: Minister of Multiculturalism and Citizenship; Minister of Employment and Immigration
- Inaugural holder: Sergio Marchi
- Formation: 30 June 1994
- Deputy: Deputy Minister of Immigration, Refugees and Citizenship Canada
- Salary: CA$299,900 (2024)
- Website: www.cic.gc.ca

The minister of immigration, refugees and citizenship (French: ministre de l'immigration, des réfugiés et de la citoyenneté) is the minister of the Crown responsible for Immigration, Refugees and Citizenship Canada (IRCC). The minister is a member of the King's Privy Council for Canada and the Canadian Cabinet.

Lena Diab has served as the minister of immigration, refugees and citizenship since 2025. The minister is selected by the prime minister and appointed by the Crown. The modern day role was created by the Department of Citizenship and Immigration Act in 1994 and the minister was known as the minister of citizenship and immigration until the present name was adopted in 2015. Before the modern-day role was introduced, the portfolios responsible for immigration in Canada throughout history were titled: Immigration and Colonization (1917–36), Mines and Resources (1936–50), Citizenship and Immigration (1950–66), Manpower and Immigration (1966–77), and Employment and Immigration (1977–96).

The Constitution Act, 1867, grants the federal Parliament as well as provincial legislatures concurrent (shared) jurisdiction over immigration. The minister works with provincial counterparts to set policy and regulate immigration to Canada. Federal legislation relating to nationality status, such as the Citizenship Act, and immigration and refugee law such as the Immigration and Refugee Protection Act, is administered by the minister. IRCC supports the minister in managing most operational programs, such as issuing Canadian passports. The Immigration and Refugee Board, which is independent from the department, also reports to the minister.

== Historical overview ==
There have been several offices throughout history responsible for immigration in Canada.

From 1917 to 1936, the office responsible for citizenship and immigration in Canada was the minister of immigration and colonization. The portfolios thereafter fell under the ministers of mines and resources and of reconstruction and supply until 1950, when the office of the minister of citizenship and immigration was established.

In 1966, the Citizenship and Immigration ministry was largely replaced by that of the minister of manpower and immigration, who would keep responsibility over immigration until 1977. From then on, the immigration portfolio would fall under the minister of employment and immigration until 1996.

In January 1991, the office of minister of multiculturalism and citizenship was created, adopting responsibility over citizenship matters. This office lasted until 1994, when the post of minister of citizenship and immigration was resuscitated by the Department of Citizenship and Immigration Act, substantially revamping the immigration and citizenship portfolios. In 2008, the office was renamed to the minister of citizenship, immigration and multiculturalism, only to again drop the multiculturalism portfolio in 2013.

As of 2 July 2013, the Citizenship and Immigration portfolio inherited primary responsibility for Passport Canada and the administration of the Canadian Passport Order from the Foreign Affairs and International Trade portfolio.

On 4 November 2015, the name of the department has changed from Citizenship and Immigration Canada to Immigration, Refugees and Citizenship Canada.

== List of ministers ==
The office of minister of citizenship and immigration was created in 1950 by "Statute 13 George VI, c. 16". That office was abolished in 1966, and replaced by the minister of manpower and immigration. The office responsible for immigration in Canada would again be titled minister of citizenship and immigration," with its creation in 1994 by the Department of Citizenship and Immigration Act (Statute 42–43 Elizabeth II, c. 31), succeeding the minister of employment and immigration.

Though having its name changed in 2015 to minister of immigration, refugees and citizenship, the office created in 1994 as the minister of citizenship and immigration" is still the one that is currently in effect and is responsible for Immigration, Refugees and Citizenship Canada.

The following immigration ministers are those who assumed the position under the office that was created in 1994.

No.	Portrait	Name	Term of office		Political party	Ministry
Ministers of Citizenship and Immigration (1994–2015)
9		Sergio Marchi	30 June 1994	24 January 1996	Liberal	26 (Chrétien)
10		Lucienne Robillard	25 January 1996	2 August 1999	Liberal	26 (Chrétien)
11		Elinor Caplan	3 August 1999	14 January 2002	Liberal	26 (Chrétien)
12		Denis Coderre	15 January 2002	11 December 2003	Liberal	26 (Chrétien)
13		Judy Sgro	12 December 2003	13 January 2005	Liberal	27 (Martin)
14		Joe Volpe	14 January 2005	5 February 2006	Liberal	27 (Martin)
15		Monte Solberg	6 February 2006	3 January 2007	Conservative	28 (Harper)
16		Diane Finley	4 January 2007	29 October 2008	Conservative	28 (Harper)
17		Jason Kenney	30 October 2008	15 July 2013	Conservative	28 (Harper)
18		Chris Alexander	15 July 2013	3 November 2015	Conservative	28 (Harper)
Minister of Immigration, Refugees and Citizenship
19		John McCallum	4 November 2015	10 January 2017	Liberal	29 (J. Trudeau)
20		Ahmed Hussen	10 January 2017	20 November 2019	Liberal	29 (J. Trudeau)
21		Marco Mendicino	20 November 2019	26 October 2021	Liberal	29 (J. Trudeau)
22		Sean Fraser	26 October 2021	26 July 2023	Liberal	29 (J. Trudeau)
23		Marc Miller	26 July 2023	14 March 2025	Liberal	29 (J. Trudeau)
24		Rachel Bendayan	14 March 2025	13 May 2025	Liberal	30 (Carney)
25		Lena Diab	13 May 2025	Incumbent	Liberal	30 (Carney)
Key: Liberal Party of Canada Conservative Party of Canada

== Preceding offices responsible for immigration ==
There have been several offices throughout history responsible for immigration in Canada.

Prior to the current position, the offices responsible for immigration in Canada throughout history include the minister of immigration and colonization (1917–1936), minister of mines and resources (1936–1950), minister of citizenship and immigration (1950–1966), minister of manpower and immigration (1966–1977), minister of employment and immigration (1977–1996).

=== Minister of Immigration and Colonization (1917–36) ===
Minister of Immigration and Colonization
- Member of: Cabinet of Canada
- Formation: 1917
- First holder: James Alexander Calder
- Final holder: Thomas Alexander Crerar
- Abolished: 1936

The minister of immigration and colonization was an office in the Cabinet of Canada from 1917 to 1936, superseded by the minister of mines and resources.

After 1950, the position has been succeeded by minister of citizenship and immigration (1950–1966), minister of manpower and immigration (1966–1977), and minister of employment and immigration (1977–1996).

Ministers of Immigration and Colonization
No.	Name	Term of office		Ministry
1.	James Alexander Calder	12 October 1917	10 July 1920	under Borden
	James Alexander Calder (cont’d)	10 July 1920	20 September 1921	under Meighen
3.	John Wesley Edwards	21 September 1921	29 December 1921	under Meighen
*	Hewitt Bostock (acting)	3 January 1922	2 February 1922	under King
*	Charles Stewart (acting)	20 February 1922	16 August 1923	under King
4.	James Alexander Robb	17 August 1923	4 September 1925	under King
5.	George Newcombe Gordon	7 September 1925	12 November 1925	under King
*	Charles Stewart (acting)	13 November 1925	28 June 1926	under King
*	Robert James Manion (acting)	29 June 1926	12 July 1926	under Meighen
*	Henry Lumley Drayton (acting)	13 July 1926	25 September 1926	under Meighen
6.	Robert Forke	26 September 1926	29 December 1929	under King
*	Charles Stewart (acting)	30 December 1929	26 June 1930	under King
7.	Ian Alistair Mackenzie	27 June 1930	7 August 1930	under King
8.	Wesley Ashton Gordon	7 August 1930	23 October 1935	under Bennett
9.	Thomas Alexander Crerar	23 October 1935	30 November 1936	under King

=== Minister of Mines and Resources (1936–50) ===
The minister of mines and resources was a cabinet portfolio from 1936 to 1950 that had absorbed the responsibilities belonging to the offices of minister of immigration and colonization, as well as of the minister of the interior, minister of mines, and superintendent-general of Indian affairs. The last minister of immigration and colonization, Thomas Alexander Crerar, remained in office under the new title of minister of mines and resources.

=== Citizenship and Immigration (1950–66) ===
Minister of Citizenship and Immigration (1950–1966)
- Member of: Cabinet of Canada
- Constituting instrument: Statute 13 George VI, c. 16
- Formation: 18 January 1950
- First holder: Walter Edward Harris
- Final holder: Jean Marchand
- Abolished: 1 October 1966

The office of minister of citizenship and immigration came in force on 18 January 1950, and would be abolished and replaced by the minister of manpower and immigration as of 1 October 1966.

Following the minister of manpower and immigration (1966–1977) and the minister of employment and immigration (1977–1996), the office responsible for immigration in Canada would again be titled minister of citizenship and immigration, which was created in 1994 and is currently in effect (though changing its name to the minister immigration, refugees and citizenship as of 2015).

Ministers of Citizenship and Immigration (1950–1966)
No.	Portrait	Name	Term of office		Political party	Ministry
1		Walter Harris	18 January 1950	30 June 1954	Liberal	17 (St. Laurent)
2		Jack Pickersgill	1 July 1954	21 June 1957	Liberal	17 (St. Laurent)
–		Davie Fulton (Acting)	21 June 1957	11 May 1958	Progressive Conservative	18 (Diefenbaker)
3		Ellen Fairclough	12 May 1958	8 August 1962	Progressive Conservative	18 (Diefenbaker)
4		Dick Bell	9 August 1962	22 April 1963	Progressive Conservative	18 (Diefenbaker)
5		Guy Favreau	22 April 1963	2 February 1964	Liberal	19 (Pearson)
6		René Tremblay	3 February 1964	14 February 1965	Liberal	19 (Pearson)
7		John Robert Nicholson	15 February 1965	17 December 1965	Liberal	19 (Pearson)
8		Jean Marchand	18 December 1965	30 September 1966	Liberal	19 (Pearson)
Key: Liberal Party of Canada Progressive Conservative

=== Minister of Manpower and Immigration (1966–77) ===
Minister of Manpower and Immigration
- Member of: Cabinet of Canada
- Constituting instrument: Statute 14–15 Elizabeth II, c. 25
- Formation: 1 October 1966
- First holder: Jean Marchand
- Final holder: Bud Cullen
- Abolished: 14 August 1977

Minister of Manpower and Immigration was a former position in the Cabinet of Canada from 1966 to 1977. The position was created after the minister of citizenship and immigration was dissolved in 1966. It was abolished and replaced with the minister of employment and immigration in 1977.

Ministers of Manpower and Immigration
No.	Name	Term of office		Ministry
1.	Jean Marchand	1 October 1966	20 April 1968	under Lester Pearson
1.	Jean Marchand	20 April 1968	5 July 1968	under Pierre Trudeau
2.	Allan MacEachen	5 July 1968	23 September 1970	under Pierre Trudeau
3.	Otto Lang	24 September 1970	27 January 1972	under Pierre Trudeau
4.	Bryce Mackasey	28 January 1972	26 November 1972	under Pierre Trudeau
5.	Bob Andras	27 November 1972	13 September 1976	under Pierre Trudeau
6.	Bud Cullen	14 September 1976	14 August 1977	under Pierre Trudeau

=== Minister of Employment and Immigration (1977–96) ===
The minister of employment and immigration was an office in the Cabinet of Canada, in operation from 1977 to 1996, and was first held by Bud Cullen, who continued from his preceding role as the minister of manpower and immigration.

On 12 July 1996, the office of the minister of employment and immigration was abolished and replaced with the office of minister of human resources development. The portfolio for immigration was transferred to the office of minister of citizenship and immigration following the reorganization of the government and formation of the department for Citizenship and Immigration Canada.

Ministers of Employment and Immigration
No.	Name	Term of office		Political party	Ministry
1	Bud Cullen	15 August 1977	3 June 1979	Liberal	20 (P. E. Trudeau)
2	Ron Atkey	4 June 1979	2 March 1980	Progressive Conservative	21 (Clark)
3	Lloyd Axworthy	3 March 1980	11 August 1983	Liberal	22 (P. E. Trudeau)
4	John Roberts	12 August 1983	29 June 1984	Liberal	22 (P. E. Trudeau)
4	John Roberts	30 June 1984	16 September 1984	Liberal	23 (Turner)
5	Flora MacDonald	17 September 1984	29 June 1986	Progressive Conservative	24 (Mulroney)
6	Benoît Bouchard	30 June 1986	30 March 1988	Progressive Conservative	24 (Mulroney)
7	Barbara McDougall	31 March 1988	20 April 1991	Progressive Conservative	24 (Mulroney)
8	Bernard Valcourt	21 April 1991	24 June 1993	Progressive Conservative	24 (Mulroney)
8	Bernard Valcourt	25 June 1993	3 November 1993	Progressive Conservative	25 (Campbell)
–	Lloyd Axworthy (second time)	4 November 1993	24 January 1996	Liberal	26 (Chrétien)
9	Douglas Young	25 January 1996	11 July 1996	Liberal	26 (Chrétien)
Key: Liberal Party of Canada Progressive Conservative

== See also ==
- Immigration to Canada
- Minister of Immigration (Quebec)
- Canadian citizenship
