= Gold mining in Canada =

Gold mining in Canada refers to the extraction and harvesting of gold by mining in Canada.

The Aboriginal peoples used gold along with copper, silver, and other minerals for tools, weapons, art, and eventually trading. The first major gold mine in Canada was opened in 1867 by Marcus Hubert Powell and it was named the Richardson Mine, located in Ontario. It was closed in 1869 after two years and only 100 ounces of gold could be extracted. Canada is now the 4th largest producer of gold in the world.

== History ==
The first instance of gold being documented was in 1823, when it was discovered in the Chaudière River in eastern Quebec. The gold found in this time period was located in river streams and was collected via hand, nets, or panning. Nova scotia was also home to the first few mining booms in Canada dating around 1860-1940.

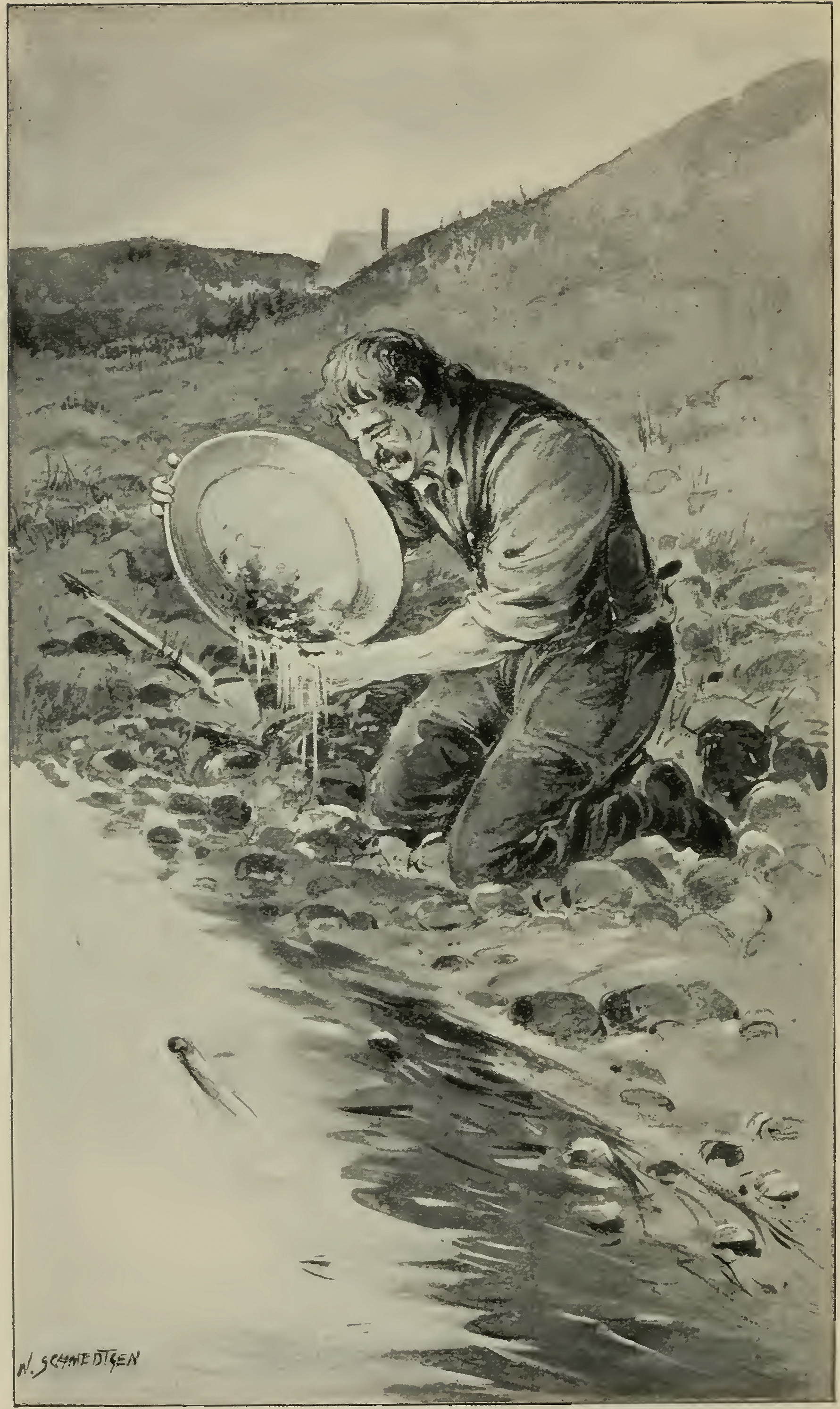
An example of how gold panning worked in river environments.

The first major discovery of gold was found in the sands of Fraser River, British Columbia, in 1858. This discovery of gold sparked a conflict between Aboriginal peoples and those who came from western United States, as well as mercenaries from foreign countries such as France or Germany, including the Fraser Canyon War.

Only a few years after the discovery of gold in the Fraser River area, the Cariboo Gold Rush started in 1861 and lasted until 1867. This was one of the first documented gold rushes in Canada and attracted mainly Canadian and British miners. Many towns were developed in nearby areas for miners to continue extracting resources. One of the towns, Barkerville, had deposits that lasted until the 1930s, and the total gold produced in the Cariboo district (Richfield, Camerontown, Barkerville) was estimated to be worth $50,000,000.

The Klondike Gold Rush (1897-1899) was one of the most efficient gold collection periods in Canada's history. This gold rush was a factor in the foundation of the Yukon territory that we recognize today. In 1896, an American prospector named George Carmack made the discovery of gold alongside Skookum Jim Mason and Dawson Charlie, Tagish First Nation members, on Rabbit Creek, which was located within the Klondike River. This gold rush sparked one of the largest stampedes of gold miners and over 10,000 people from all over the world travelled to the area in search for gold. While the gold rush only lasted two years, an estimated $29,000,000 in gold was mined.

In the early 1900s, smaller operations of gold mining began where several gold-mining camps were set up in Northern Ontario and Northern Quebec. These gold-mining camps, while not as intensive as gold rushes, still produced a fair amount of gold that would provide a stable economy when the World Wars occurred. One of the camps, located in Malartic, Quebec, would later go on to become the largest and most successful Canadian gold mine.

The final major point in the Canadian gold mining timeline began in 1981 with the discovery of the Hemlo gold deposits in Northern and Northwestern Ontario. During this period, gold was also discovered across all Canadian provinces and territories and gold production from the 1990 to 1997 period averaged more than 150 tonnes a year. The value of gold skyrocketed as the production dwindled in the 2010s and the discovery of gold has been immense to the Canadian economy, now producing more than $20 billion per year and contributing to 7.2% of the world's total gold production.

== Locations ==
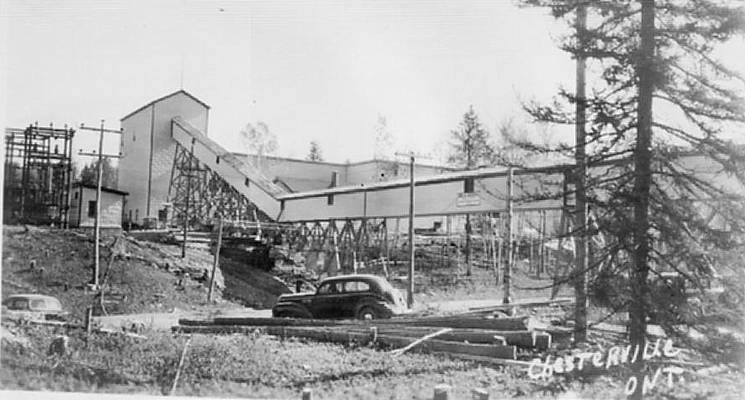
Chesterville Gold Mine in Ontario, Canada (1939 - 1952)

Gold mines and gold mining in Canada have been documented in Ontario, Québec, Nova Scotia, British Columbia, New Brunswick, Northwest Territories, and Nunavut, many of the mines and locations where gold was found being either inactive or exhausted of resources.

As of 2023, there are 127 active gold mines in Canada, most of them being located in Ontario and Quebec. These two provinces produce and refine most of the gold in Canada, and the most prolific mine, the Canadian Malartic Mine, is located in western Quebec.

== Types of mining ==
The majority of gold extracted in Canada is due to open-pit mines and underground hard rock mining, about ninety percent. The last ten percent consists of placer and base metal mining. For example, Northern Ontario primarily consists of underground mining and is expected to increase open pit mines in future mining goals. Sustainable mining has been an active topic for Canadian mining and mining in general worldwide. There have been many abandoned mines due to open-pit and hard rock mining, which contributes to overall pollution. The amount of toxic metal has increased in fresh waterbodies as a result of mining.

== Production and trading ==
- As of 2021, Canadians have produced more than 223 tonnes of gold, 70% of that amount coming from Ontario and Quebec mines.
- Canada is the 4th largest producer of gold in the world, only behind China, Australia, and Russia.
- 2.2% of the world's total gold reserves belong to Canada.
- Canada mainly trades gold with the United Kingdom. In 2021, 47% of exported Canadian gold went to the United Kingdom.
