= Minister of Crown–Indigenous Relations =

Minister of the Crown in the Canadian Cabinet

- Ministre des Relations Couronne-Autochtones
- Incumbent; Rebecca Alty since May 13, 2025
- Crown–Indigenous Relations and Northern Affairs Canada
- Style: The Honourable
- Member of: Parliament; Privy Council; Cabinet
- Reports to: Parliament; Prime Minister
- Appointer: Monarch (represented by the governor general) on the advice of the prime minister
- Term length: At His Majesty's pleasure
- Constituting instrument: Department of Crown-Indigenous Relations and Northern Affairs Act
- Precursor: Minister of Indian Affairs and Northern Development
- Formation: Current: June 21, 2019; Historic: May 22, 1868
- First holder: Current: Carolyn Bennett; Historic: Hector Louis Langevin
- Salary: CA$299,900 (2024)
- Website: www.rcaanc-cirnac.gc.ca

In Canada, the minister of Crown–Indigenous relations (French: ministre des relations couronne-autochtones) is a minister of the Crown who is responsible for the Department of Crown–Indigenous Relations and Northern Affairs, along with the minister of northern and Arctic affairs. The department administers the Indian Act and other legislation dealing with "Indians and lands reserved for the Indians" under subsection 91(24) of the Constitution Act, 1867. The minister is also more broadly responsible for overall relations between the Government of Canada and First Nations, Métis, and Inuit.

Rebecca Alty has served as The minister of Crown–Indigenous relations since May 13, 2025. The minister is selected by the prime minister and appointed by the Crown. The position is one of two portfolios responsible for policies relating to Indigenous peoples in Canada, with the minister of Indigenous services overseeing service delivery.

== Legal title ==
The original title of the position in the Department of Indian Affairs and Northern Development Act was "Minister of Indian Affairs and Northern Development". It was changed to "Minister of Aboriginal Affairs and Northern Development" on May 18, 2011, and to "Minister of Indigenous and Northern Affairs" on November 4, 2015. The current title under Crown–Indigenous Relations and Northern Affairs Canada was introduced on August 28, 2017, when Prime Minister Justin Trudeau announced that the Department of Indian Affairs and Northern Development would be restructure and gradually abolished.

The current version of the position was created alongside the minister of Indigenous services, who administers Indigenous Services Canada, the department responsible for health care, water, and other services to Indigenous communities when Prime Minister Justin Trudeau announced on August 28, 2017, that the federal government intended to abolish the Indigenous and Northern Affairs Canada department. The Department of Indian Affairs and Northern Development Act was formally repealed with the Budget Implementation Act, 2019, and replaced with the Department of Crown-Indigenous Relations and Northern Affairs Act and Department of Indigenous Services Act.

Before 1996, and from 2018 to 2024, responsibility for northern affairs was held by a separate minister of northern affairs. The positions were consolidated on December 20, 2024, with Minister of Crown–Indigenous Relations Gary Anandasangaree becoming Minister of Crown–Indigenous Relations and Northern Affairs, and split again on May 13, 2025, with the northern affairs position was reintroduced as the minister of northern and Arctic affairs.

== Mandate ==
According to their website, the mandate of the Crown-Indigenous Relations and Northern Affairs Canada (CIRNAC) is to "renew the nation-to-nation, Inuit-Crown, government-to-government relationship between Canada and First Nations, Inuit and Métis; modernize Government of Canada structures to enable Indigenous peoples to build capacity and support their vision of self-determination; and lead the Government of Canada's work in the North."

== Nomenclature ==
In their July 5, 2018, document, CIRNAC wrote that the concept of Aboriginal nation in Canada, based on the 1996 Report of the Royal Commission on Aboriginal Peoples (RCAP), refers to "a sizeable body of Aboriginal people with a shared sense of national identity that constitutes the predominant population in a certain territory or collection of territories. There are three elements in this definition: collective sense of identity; size as a measure of capacity; and territorial predominance. The first element, a collective sense of identity, can be based on a variety of factors. It is usually grounded in a common heritage, which comprises such elements as a common history, language, culture, traditions, political consciousness, laws, governmental structures, spirituality, ancestry, homeland or adherence to a particular treaty."

According to the 1985 Department of Indian Affairs and Northern Development Act (R.S.C., 1985, c. I-6) the term "Indian" remained in the department's legal name, although the term "Indigenous" is used in its applied title under the Federal Identity Program.

According to a 2004 AADNC Government of Canada document, the term "First Nation", has been used since the 1970s instead of the word "Indian", which some people found offensive. The term "Indian" is used for legal and historical documents such as Status Indians as defined by the Indian Act. For example, the term "Indian" continues to be used in the historical and legal document, the Canadian Constitution and federal statutes. The term "Aboriginal" is commonly used when referring to the three groups of Indigenous peoples as a whole, First Nations, Inuit and Métis. It is also used by Aboriginal people who live within Canada who claim rights of sovereignty or Aboriginal title to lands.

== Background ==
In 1983, the Penner Report by the Special Parliamentary Committee on Indian Self-Government, chaired by Liberal MP Keith Penner, had recommended the phasing out of the Indian Act and the Department of Indian Affairs and the introduction of Native self-government. Then-Prime Minister Brian Mulroney, had dismissed the report in 1984. Reports and commissions following the Penner Report including the "Report on the Royal Commission on Aboriginal Peoples (1996), the Truth and Reconciliation Commission of Canada Calls to Action (2015), the Principles Respecting the Government of Canada’s Relationship with Indigenous Peoples (2017), Recognition of Indigenous Rights and Self-Determination discussions, and the national engagement—[Recognition and Implementation of Indigenous Rights Framework (RIIRF)]—led by the Minister of Crown-Indigenous Relations", confirmed that "changes are needed to ensure that policies effectively respond to the needs and interests of Indigenous communities" and that policies need to be aligned "with evolving laws and the United Nations Declaration on the Rights of Indigenous Peoples, including the concept of free, prior and informed consent." On February 14, 2018, during a speech in the House of Commons, Trudeau announced the formation of the Recognition and Implementation of Indigenous Rights Framework which was intended to "enshrine Section 35 of the Constitution Act, 1982— which affirms Indigenous rights — in federal law" and to "fill the gap between federal government policies and multiple court decisions on Indigenous rights." It was to be undertaken in "full partnership with First Nations, Inuit, and Métis Peoples".

In their Fourteenth Report released on December 3, 2018, the Standing Senate Committee on Aboriginal Peoples listed improvements, changes and concerns related to the relationship between CIRNAC and agencies such as the Lands Advisory Board also known as First Nations Land Management Resource Centre (FNLMRC), the First Nations Tax Commission (FNTC) (Note: The First Nations Tax Commission (FNTC) is a "shared-governance First Nation public institution that supports First Nation taxation under the First Nations Fiscal Management Act and under section 83 of the Indian Act.") and the First Nations Financial Management Board (Note: Previous major proposed changes to the Indian Act included the First Nations Governance Act (FNGA) proposed in 2002 and officially abandoned in 2004 as paternalistic with a process that bypassed the elected leadership of First Nations communities.)

== Changing names and responsibilities from 1867 to 2019 ==
Prior to Canadian Confederation in 1867, the Indian Department for British North America was responsible for relations between the Crown and Indigenous peoples.

A 'Superintendent-general of Indian Affairs' was in the Cabinet of Canada from 1867 until 1936 when the Minister of Mines and Resources became responsible for indigenous relations. In 1950, the Indian Affairs branch was transferred to the minister of citizenship and immigration, who had responsibility for "status Indians" until the creation of the position of minister of Indian affairs and northern development in 1966.

Before 1966, the Northern Development portions of the portfolio were the responsibility of the minister of northern affairs and national resources.

A 1983 House of Commons Committee recommended that Indian or First Nations communities be allowed to write their own membership code provided that the code did not violate fundamental human rights. A second report from the 1983 Penner Committee recommended the gradual abolition of the office of minister of Indian affairs and a transfer of responsibility for their own affairs to First Nations communities. Proposed changes died on the House of Commons' Order Paper at the end of the parliamentary session and have not been re-introduced.

Until amendments to the Indian Act in 1985 restored Indian status to many people whose status had been revoked for discriminatory reasons, about half of the persons who identified as 'Indian' were entitled to be registered as Indians under the Indian Act and to receive the benefits reserved for registered Indians under the Act. In 1985, status was restored to 100,000 people including women who married men who were not Status Indians, and their children; people who had, prior to 1961, renounced their Indian status so they could vote in federal elections, and their children; people whose mother and paternal grandmother did not have status before marriage (these people lost status at 21), and their children; and people who had been born out of wedlock of mothers with status and fathers without, and their children.

As of July 2004, the Minister of Indian Affairs and Northern Development has been assigned the role of Federal Interlocutor for Métis and Non-Status Indians concurrently.

By 2017, CIRNAC and the Minister of Indigenous Services were responsible for federal government relations with First Nations, Inuit and Métis.

== Acts ==
The Minister has responsibilities, wholly or partially, under a number of Acts:(list may not be complete)

- Arctic Waters Pollution Prevention Act R.S., 1985, c. A-12
- British Columbia Indian Cut-off Lands Settlement Act — 1984, c. 2
- British Columbia Indian Reserves Mineral Resources Act — 1943–44, c. 19
- British Columbia Treaty Commission Act — 1995, c. 45
- Canada Petroleum Resources Act — R.S., 1985, c. 36 (2nd Supp.)
- Canada-Yukon Oil and Gas Accord Implementation Act — 1998, c. 5
- Canadian Polar Commission Act — 1991, c. 6
- Caughnawaga Indian Reserve Act — 1934, c. 29
- Claim Settlements (Alberta and Saskatchewan)Implementation Act — 2002, c-3
- Condominium Ordinance Validation Act— 1985, c. 46
- Cree-Naskapi (of Quebec) Act — 1984, c. 18
- Department of Crown-Indigenous Relations and Northern Affairs Act — S.C. 2019, c. 29, s. 337
- Dominion Water Power Act, — R.S., 1985, c. W-4
- First Nations Commercial and Industrial Development Act — 2005, c. 53
- First Nations Jurisdiction over Education in British Columbia Act — 2006, c. 10
- First Nations Land Management Act — 1999, c. 24
- First Nations Oil and Gas and Moneys Management Act — 2005, c. 48
- Fort Nelson Indian Reserve Minerals Revenue Sharing Act — 1980-81-82-83, c. 38
- Grassy Narrows and Islington Indian Bands Mercury Pollution Claims Settlement Act — 1986, c. 23
- Gwich’in Land Claim Settlement Act — 1992, c. 53
- Indian Act — R.S., 1985, c. I-5
- Indian Lands Agreement Act (1986) — 1988, c. 39
- Indian Oil and Gas Act — R.S., 1985, c. I-7
- Kanesatake Interim Land Base Governance Act — 2001, c. 8
- Kelowna Accord Implementation Act 2008, c. 23
- Labrador Inuit Land Claims Agreement Act — 2005, c. 27
- Lands Surveys Act, Canada — R.S., 1985, c. L-6 Part III
- Mackenzie Valley Resource Management Act — 1998, c. 25
- Manitoba Claim Settlements Implementation Act — 2000, c. 33
- Mi’kmaq Education Act — 1998, c. 24
- Natural Resources Transfer (School Lands) Amendments, (Alberta, Manitoba and Saskatchewan) (see also School Lands) — 1960–61, c. 62
- Nelson House First Nation Flooded Land Act — 1997, c. 29
- New Brunswick Indian Reserves Agreement — 1959, c. 47
- Northwest Territories Act — R.S., 1985, c. N-27
- Northwest Territories Waters Act — 1992, c. 39
- Nova Scotia Indian Reserves Agreement — 1959, c. 50
- Nunavik Inuit Land Claims Agreement Act — 2008, c. 2
- Nunavut Act — 1993, c. 28
- Nunavut Land Claims Agreement Act — 1993, c. 29
- Nunavut Waters and Nunavut Surface Rights Tribunal Act — 2002, c. 10
- Oil and Gas Operations Act, Canada — R.S., 1985, c. O-7
- Pictou Landing Indian Band Agreement Act — 1995, c. 4
- Sahtu Dene and Metis Land Claim Settlement Act — 1994, c. 27
- St. Peters Indian Reserve Act — 1916, c. 24
- St. Regis Islands Act — 1926–27, c. 37
- Saskatchewan Treaty Land Entitlement Act — 1993, c. 11
- Sechelt Indian Band Self-Government Act — 1986, c. 27
- Songhees Indian Reserve Act — 1911, c. 24
- Specific Claims Tribunal Act 2008, c. 22
- Split Lake Cree First Nation Flooded Land Act — 1994, c. 42
- Territorial Lands Act — R.S., 1985, c. T-7
- Tlicho Land Claims and Self-Government Act — 2005, c. 1
- Tsawwassen First Nation Final Agreement Act — 2008, c. 32
- Westbank First Nation Self-Government Act — 2004, c. 17
- Western Arctic (Inuvialuit) Claims Settlement Act — 1984, c. 24
- York Factory First Nation Flooded Land Act — 1997, c. 28
- Yukon Act — 2002, c. 7
- Yukon Environmental and Socioeconomic Assessment Act — 2003, c. 7
- Yukon First Nations Self-Government Act — 1994, c. 35

=== Boards, Commissions and Other Responsibilities ===
The Minister is also the lead Minister or responsible Minister for:

- Canadian Polar Commission
- Corporation for the Mitigation of Mackenzie Gas Project Impacts
- First Nations Statistical Institute
- Indian Oil and Gas Canada
- Northwest Territories Commissioner
- Northwest Territories Water Board
- Mackenzie Valley Environmental Impact Review Board
- Contract for Implementation of the Nunavut Land Claims Agreement
- Nunavut Commissioner
- Nunavut Impact Review Board
- Nunavut Planning Commission
- Nunavut Water Board
- Yukon Territory Commissioner

== List of ministers ==
No.	Portrait	Name	Term of office		Political party	Ministry
Superintendent-General of Indian Affairs
1		Hector Louis Langevin	May 22, 1868	December 7, 1869	Conservative	1 (Macdonald)
2		Joseph Howe	December 8, 1869	May 6, 1873	Liberal-Conservative	1 (Macdonald)
–		James Cox Aikins (acting)	May 7, 1873	June 13, 1873	Liberal-Conservative	1 (Macdonald)
3		Thomas Nicholson Gibbs	June 14, 1873	June 30, 1873	Liberal-Conservative	1 (Macdonald)
4		Alexander Campbell	July 1, 1873	November 5, 1873	Conservative	1 (Macdonald)
5		David Laird	November 7, 1873	October 6, 1876	Liberal	2 (Mackenzie)
–		Richard William Scott (acting)	October 7, 1876	October 23, 1876	Liberal	2 (Mackenzie)
6		David Mills	October 24, 1876	October 8, 1878	Liberal	2 (Mackenzie)
7		Sir John A. Macdonald; 1st time	October 17, 1878	October 2, 1887	Liberal-Conservative	3 (Macdonald)
8		Thomas White	October 3, 1887	April 21, 1888	Conservative	3 (Macdonald)
(7)		Sir John A. Macdonald (acting); 2nd time	May 8, 1888	September 24, 1888	Liberal-Conservative	3 (Macdonald)
9		Edgar Dewdney	September 25, 1888	June 6, 1891	Conservative	3 (Macdonald)
9		Edgar Dewdney	June 16, 1891	October 16, 1892	Conservative	4 (Abbott)
10		Thomas Mayne Daly	October 17, 1892	November 24, 1892	Liberal-Conservative	4 (Abbott)
10		Thomas Mayne Daly	December 5, 1892	December 12, 1894	Liberal-Conservative	5 (Thompson)
10		Thomas Mayne Daly	December 21, 1894	April 27, 1896	Liberal-Conservative	6 (Bowell)
11		Hugh John Macdonald	May 1, 1896	July 8, 1896	Conservative	7 (Tupper)
–		Richard William Scott (acting)	July 17, 1896	November 16, 1896	Liberal	8 (Laurier)
12		Clifford Sifton	November 17, 1896	February 28, 1905	Liberal	8 (Laurier)
–		Sir Wilfrid Laurier (acting)	March 13, 1905	April 7, 1905	Liberal	8 (Laurier)
13		Frank Oliver	April 8, 1905	October 6, 1911	Liberal	8 (Laurier)
14		Robert Rogers	October 10, 1911	October 28, 1912	Conservative	9 (Borden)
15		William James Roche	October 29, 1912	October 12, 1917	Conservative	9 (Borden)
16		Arthur Meighen	October 12, 1917	July 10, 1920	Unionist	10 (Borden)
17		Sir James Alexander Lougheed	July 10, 1920	December 29, 1921	Liberal-Conservative	11 (Meighen)
18		Charles Stewart; 1st time	December 29, 1921	June 28, 1926	Liberal	12 (Mackenzie King)
–		Henry Herbert Stevens (acting)	June 29, 1926	July 12, 1926	Conservative	13 (Meighen)
–		R. B. Bennett (acting)	July 13, 1926	September 25, 1926	Conservative	13 (Meighen)
(18)		Charles Stewart; 2nd time	September 26, 1926	June 26, 1930	Liberal	14 (Mackenzie King)
19		Ian Alistair Mackenzie	June 27, 1930	August 7, 1930	Liberal	14 (Mackenzie King)
20		Thomas Gerow Murphy	August 7, 1930	October 23, 1935	Conservative	15 (Bennett)
21		Thomas Alexander Crerar	October 23, 1935	November 30, 1936	Liberal	16 (Mackenzie King)
Minister responsible for Indian Affairs (Minister of the Interior, Minister of Mines)
(21)		Thomas Alexander Crerar	December 1, 1936	April 17, 1945	Liberal	16 (Mackenzie King)
22		James Allison Glen	April 18, 1945	June 10, 1948	Liberal	16 (Mackenzie King)
23		James Angus MacKinnon	June 10, 1948	November 15, 1948	Liberal	16 (Mackenzie King)
23		James Angus MacKinnon	November 15, 1948	March 31, 1949	Liberal	17 (St. Laurent)
24		Colin William George Gibson	April 1, 1949	January 17, 1950	Liberal	17 (St. Laurent)
Minister responsible for Indian Affairs (Minister of Citizenship)
25		Walter Edward Harris	January 18, 1950	June 30, 1954	Liberal	17 (St. Laurent)
26		Jack Pickersgill	July 1, 1954	June 21, 1957	Liberal	17 (St. Laurent)
–		Davie Fulton (acting)	June 21, 1957	May 11, 1958	Progressive Conservative	18 (Diefenbaker)
27		Ellen Fairclough	May 12, 1958	August 8, 1962	Progressive Conservative	18 (Diefenbaker)
28		Dick Bell	August 9, 1962	April 22, 1963	Progressive Conservative	18 (Diefenbaker)
29		Guy Favreau	April 22, 1963	February 2, 1964	Liberal	19 (Pearson)
30		René Tremblay	February 3, 1964	February 14, 1965	Liberal	19 (Pearson)
31		John Robert Nicholson	February 15, 1965	December 17, 1965	Liberal	19 (Pearson)
32		Jean Marchand	December 18, 1965	September 30, 1966	Liberal	19 (Pearson)
Minister of Indian Affairs and Northern Development
33		Arthur Laing	October 1, 1966	April 20, 1968	Liberal	19 (Pearson)
33		Arthur Laing	April 20, 1968	July 5, 1968	Liberal	20 (P. E. Trudeau)
34		Jean Chrétien	July 5, 1968	August 7, 1974	Liberal	20 (P. E. Trudeau)
35		J. Judd Buchanan	August 8, 1974	September 13, 1976	Liberal	20 (P. E. Trudeau)
36		Warren Allmand	September 14, 1976	September 15, 1977	Liberal	20 (P. E. Trudeau)
37		James Hugh Faulkner	September 16, 1977	June 3, 1979	Liberal	20 (P. E. Trudeau)
38		Jake Epp	June 4, 1979	March 2, 1980	Progressive Conservative	21 (Clark)
39		John Munro	March 3, 1980	June 29, 1984	Liberal	22 (P. E. Trudeau)
40		Doug Frith	June 30, 1984	September 16, 1984	Liberal	23 (Turner)
41		David Crombie	September 17, 1984	June 29, 1986	Progressive Conservative	24 (Mulroney)
42		Bill McKnight	June 30, 1986	January 29, 1989	Progressive Conservative	24 (Mulroney)
43		Pierre Cadieux	January 30, 1989	February 22, 1990	Progressive Conservative	24 (Mulroney)
44		Tom Siddon	February 23, 1990	June 24, 1993	Progressive Conservative	24 (Mulroney)
45		Pauline Browes	June 25, 1993	November 3, 1993	Progressive Conservative	25 (Campbell)
46		Ron Irwin	November 4, 1993	June 10, 1997	Liberal	26 (Chrétien)
47		Jane Stewart	June 11, 1997	August 2, 1999	Liberal	26 (Chrétien)
48		Bob Nault	August 3, 1999	December 11, 2003	Liberal	26 (Chrétien)
49		Andy Mitchell	December 12, 2003	July 19, 2004	Liberal	27 (Martin)
50		Andy Scott	July 20, 2004	February 5, 2006	Liberal	27 (Martin)
51		Jim Prentice	February 6, 2006	August 14, 2007	Conservative	28 (Harper)
52		Chuck Strahl	August 14, 2007	August 6, 2010	Conservative	28 (Harper)
53		John Duncan	August 6, 2010	May 17, 2011	Conservative	28 (Harper)
Minister of Aboriginal Affairs and Northern Development
(53)		John Duncan	May 18, 2011	February 15, 2013	Conservative	28 (Harper)
–		James Moore, (acting)	February 15, 2013	February 22, 2013	Conservative	28 (Harper)
54		Bernard Valcourt	February 22, 2013	November 3, 2015	Conservative	28 (Harper)
Minister of Indigenous and Northern Affairs
55		Carolyn Bennett	November 4, 2015	August 28, 2017	Liberal	29 (J. Trudeau)
Minister of Crown–Indigenous Relations and Northern Affairs
(55)		Carolyn Bennett	August 28, 2017	July 18, 2018	Liberal	29 (J. Trudeau)
Minister of Crown–Indigenous Relations
(55)		Carolyn Bennett	July 18, 2018	October 26, 2021	Liberal	29 (J. Trudeau)
56		Marc Miller	October 26, 2021	July 26, 2023	Liberal	29 (J. Trudeau)
57		Gary Anandasangaree	July 26, 2023	December 20, 2024	Liberal	29 (J. Trudeau)
Minister of Crown–Indigenous Relations and Northern Affairs
(57)		Gary Anandasangaree	December 20, 2024	March 14, 2025	Liberal	29 (J. Trudeau)
(57)		Gary Anandasangaree	March 14, 2025	May 13, 2025	Liberal	30 (Carney)
Minister of Crown–Indigenous Relations
58		Rebecca Alty	May 13, 2025	present	Liberal	30 (Carney)

Prior to 1966, responsibilities for the Indian Affairs portion of this portfolio fell under the Minister of Citizenship and Immigration (List), and the Northern Development portion under the Minister of Northern Affairs and National Resources (List).

== See also ==
- Recognition and Implementation of Indigenous Rights Framework
- Minister of Indigenous Services
- Minister of Mines and Resources (1936–1950)
- Indian and Northern Affairs Canada
- Indian Register
- Indian Agent (Canada)
- Indian Department, for historical background
- Royal Commission on Aboriginal Peoples
- Congress of Aboriginal Peoples
- The Canadian Crown and First Nations, Inuit and Métis
- Canadian Aboriginal and Indigenous law
- Aboriginal peoples in Canada
  - First Nations
  - Inuit
  - Métis people (Canada)
- Minister for Families, Community Services and Indigenous Affairs (Australia)
