= Lucien Cardin =

Canadian lawyer, judge, and politician (1919–1988)

The Honourable Lucien Cardin PC QC
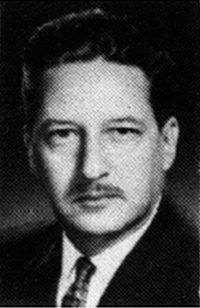

Minister of Justice Attorney General of Canada
- In office 7 July 1965 – 3 April 1967
- Prime Minister: Lester B. Pearson
- Preceded by: George McIlraith (acting)
- Succeeded by: Pierre Trudeau

Minister of Public Works
- In office 15 February 1965 – 6 July 1965
- Prime Minister: Lester B. Pearson
- Preceded by: Jean-Paul Deschatelets
- Succeeded by: George McIlraith

Associate Minister of National Defence
- In office 22 April 1963 – 14 February 1965
- Prime Minister: Lester B. Pearson
- Preceded by: Vacant
- Succeeded by: Léo Cadieux

Member of Parliament for Richelieu—Verchères
- In office 6 October 1952 – 3 April 1967
- Preceded by: Gérard Cournoyer
- Succeeded by: Jacques Tremblay

Personal details
- Born: Louis-Joseph-Lucien Cardin; 1 March 1919 Providence, Rhode Island, U.S.
- Died: 13 June 1988 (aged 69) Hull, Quebec, Canada
- Party: Liberal
- Spouse: Marcelle Petitclerc (m. 1950)
- Education: Loyola College (BA); Université de Montréal (LLB)
- Profession: Lawyer

Military service
- Allegiance: Canada
- Branch/service: Royal Canadian Navy
- Years of service: 1941–1945
- Rank: Lieutenant-Commander

Louis-Joseph-Lucien Cardin PC QC (1 March 1919 – 13 June 1988) was a Canadian lawyer, judge, and politician.

Born in Providence, Rhode Island, the son of Octave Cardin and Eldora Pagé, he studied at Loyola College and at the Université de Montréal. During World War II, he served in the Royal Canadian Navy and was discharged with the rank of Lieutenant Commander. He was called to the Quebec Bar in 1950.

In a 1952 by-election, he was elected to the House of Commons of Canada as a Liberal in the Quebec riding of Richelieu—Verchères. He was re-elected in 1953, 1957, 1958, 1962, 1963, and 1965.

From 1956 to 1957, he was the Parliamentary Assistant to the Secretary of State for External Affairs. From 1963 to 1965, he was the Associate Minister of National Defence. In 1965, he was the Minister of Public Works. From 1965 to 1967, he was the Minister of Justice and Attorney General of Canada.

Cardin was the first Canadian politician to bring the public's attention to the Munsinger affair. During taunts by Conservative MPs in the House of Commons in March 1966, Cardin shouted out across the floor of the House, "What about Monsignor?" Although he got the name wrong and later insisted that he thought Gerda Munsinger had died, the media brought attention to the issue, and there was a federal inquiry that caught the public's attention for its implications to national security during the Cold War.

He was appointed Assistant Chairman of the Tax Review Board in April 1972 and Chairman of the Tax Review Board in 1975. He was appointed Chief Judge of the Tax Court of Canada on 18 July 1983.

Political offices
Preceded by vacant	Associate Minister of National Defence; 1963-1965	Succeeded by Léo Alphonse Joseph Cadieux
Preceded by Jean-Paul Deschatelets	Minister of Public Works; 1965	Succeeded by George McIlraith
Preceded by George McIlraith	Minister of Justice; 1965-1967	Succeeded by Pierre Trudeau
