= Minister of Energy and Natural Resources =

Canadian federal cabinet position

- Ministre de l'Énergie et des Ressources naturelles
- Incumbent; Tim Hodgson since May 13, 2025
- Natural Resources Canada
- Style: The Honourable
- Member of: House of Commons; Privy Council; Cabinet
- Reports to: Parliament; Prime Minister
- Appointer: Monarch (represented by the governor general); on the advice of the prime minister
- Term length: At His Majesty's pleasure
- Inaugural holder: Anne McLellan
- Formation: 12 January 1995
- Salary: CA$299,900 (2024)
- Website: www.nrcan-rncan.gc.ca

The minister of energy and natural resources (French: ministre de l'énergie et des ressources naturelles) is the minister of the Crown in the Canadian Cabinet who is responsible for Natural Resources Canada (NRCan).

In addition to NRCan, the minister oversees the federal government's natural resources portfolio, which includes Atomic Energy of Canada Limited, the Canada Energy Regulator, and the Canadian Nuclear Safety Commission, as well as the Canada-Newfoundland and Labrador Offshore and the Canada-Nova Scotia Offshore Petroleum Boards. The Energy Supplies Allocation Board and the Northern Pipeline Agency also report to the Minister as required.

The current minister of energy and natural resources is Tim Hodgson, since May 13, 2025. This position was established in 1995 under the Department of Natural Resources Act, S.C. 1994, c. 41, which merged the positions of the minister of energy, mines and resources and minister of forestry.

== History ==
Prior to 1995, the responsibilities of the current natural resources portfolio were divided between the minister of energy, mines and resources and the minister of forestry, both posts which are now defunct.

With the transfer of the Canadian Forest Service from the Department of Forestry to the Department of Agriculture, the forestry portfolio came under the minister of agriculture between 1984 and 1985, then back to the minister of the environment from 1985. It became a single department in 1989 and then designated to the minister of energy, mines and resources in 1990.

In 1994, the Department of Natural Resources Act, S.C. 1994, c. 41, provided for the creation of the minister of natural resources, with authority to carry out matters previously undertaken by the minister of forestry and the minister of energy, mines and resources.

=== Minister of Energy, Mines and Resources ===
The minister of energy, mines, and resources (French: ministre de l'énergie, des mines et des ressources) was a member of the Cabinet from 1966 to 1995.

Prior to 1966, the responsibility related to Canadian mines and natural resources resided in various ministers:

- Minister of the Interior (1873–1936)
- Minister of Mines (1907–36)
- Minister of Mines and Resources (1936–50)
- Minister of Resources and Development (1950–53)
- Minister of Mines and Technical Surveys (1950–66)
- Minister of Northern Affairs and National Resources (1953–62)

The emerging role of energy development in federal policy would become more prominent in 1966, when that responsibility was adopted by the natural resources portfolio, whereupon the minister of mines and technical surveys was abolished and the minister of energy, mines and resources was established in its place by Statute 14-15 Eliz. II, c. 25—which received royal assent on 16 June 1966 and proclaimed in-force on October 1 later that year.

Three decades later, in 1995, the energy, mines and resources portfolio merged with that of forestry to form the current minister of natural resources, under the Department of Natural Resources Act, S.C. 1994, c. 41—which received royal assent on December 15, 1994.

=== Minister of Forestry ===
The minister of forestry was an office in the Cabinet from 1962 to 1966 and again from 1990 to 1995. Between 1966 and 1990, the holder was known as the minister of forestry and rural development.

Prior to 1962, the responsibility for forestry resided in various ministers:

- Minister of the Interior (1873–1936)
- Minister of Mines and Resources (1936–50)
- Minister of Resources and Development (1950–53)
- Minister of Northern Affairs and National Resources (1953–62)

The position of minister of forestry was first created in 1962, late in John Diefenbaker's premiership. It lasted into the government of Lester B. Pearson.

In 1971, during the first mandate of Pierre Trudeau's government, responsibility for forestry along with fisheries merged into the minister of the environment, briefly renamed as minister of fisheries and the environment from 1976 to 1979, minister of state (environment) from 1977 to 1979, and then minister of the environment again from 1979 to 1984.

In 1989, during the second mandate of Brian Mulroney's government, the second incarnation of the Department of Forestry was established under the Department of Forestry Act (assented to 21 December 1989). In 1995, during the first mandate of Jean Chrétien's government, the forestry portfolio was merged with that of the minister of energy, mines, and resources to create the post of minister of natural resources. During the cabinet shuffle of July 26, 2023, this title was expanded to become the Minister of Energy and Natural Resources.

== List of ministers ==
Key:

Liberal Party of Canada
Conservative Party of Canada

No.	Portrait	Name	Term of office		Political party	Ministry
Minister of Natural Resources
1		Anne McLellan	January 12, 1995	June 10, 1997	Liberal	26 (Chrétien)
2		Ralph Goodale	June 11, 1997	January 14, 2002	Liberal	26 (Chrétien)
3		Herb Dhaliwal	January 15, 2002	December 11, 2003	Liberal	26 (Chrétien)
4		John Efford	December 12, 2003	September 25, 2005	Liberal	27 (Martin)
5		John McCallum	September 26, 2005	February 3, 2006	Liberal	27 (Martin)
6		Gary Lunn	January 6, 2006	October 29, 2008	Conservative	28 (Harper)
7		Lisa Raitt	October 30, 2008	January 19, 2010	Conservative	28 (Harper)
8		Christian Paradis	January 19, 2010	May 18, 2011	Conservative	28 (Harper)
9		Joe Oliver	May 18, 2011	March 19, 2014	Conservative	28 (Harper)
10		Greg Rickford	March 19, 2014	November 4, 2015	Conservative	28 (Harper)
11		Jim Carr	November 4, 2015	July 17, 2018	Liberal	29 (J. Trudeau)
12		Amarjeet Sohi	July 17, 2018	November 20, 2019	Liberal	29 (J. Trudeau)
13		Seamus O'Regan	November 20, 2019	October 26, 2021	Liberal	29 (J. Trudeau)
14		Jonathan Wilkinson	October 26, 2021	July 26, 2023	Liberal	29 (J. Trudeau)
Minister of Energy and Natural Resources
(14)		Jonathan Wilkinson	July 26, 2023	March 14, 2025	Liberal	29 (J. Trudeau)
(14)		Jonathan Wilkinson	March 14, 2025	May 13, 2025	Liberal	30 (Carney)
15		Tim Hodgson	May 13, 2025	present	Liberal	30 (Carney)

Ministers of Energy, Mines and Resources
No.	Minister	Term	Ministry
1.	Jean-Luc Pépin	October 1, 1966 – April 20, 1968	under Pearson
	Jean-Luc Pépin (cont'd)	April 20, 1968 – July 5, 1968	under Trudeau Sr.
2.	John James Greene	July 6, 1968 – January 27, 1972	under Trudeau Sr.
3.	Donald Stovel Macdonald	January 28, 1972 – September 25, 1975	under Trudeau Sr.
4.	Alastair Gillespie	September 26, 1975 – June 3, 1979	under Trudeau Sr.
5.	Ray Hnatyshyn	June 4, 1979 – March 2, 1980	under Clark
6.	Marc Lalonde	March 3, 1980 – September 9, 1982	under Trudeau Sr.
7.	Jean Chrétien	September 10, 1982 – June 29, 1984	under Trudeau Sr.
8.	Gerald A. Regan	June 30, 1984 – September 16, 1984	under Turner
9.	Pat Carney	September 17, 1984 – June 29, 1986	under Mulroney
10.	Marcel Masse	June 30, 1986 – January 29, 1989	under Mulroney
11.	Arthur Jacob Epp	January 30, 1989 – January 3, 1993	under Mulroney
12.	William Hunter McKnight	January 4, 1993 – June 24, 1993	under Mulroney
13.	Bobbie Sparrow	June 25, 1993 – November 3, 1993	under Campbell
14.	Anne McLellan	November 4, 1993 – January 11, 1995	under Chrétien

No.	Minister	Term	Ministry
Minister of Forestry (1960–66)
1.	Hugh John Flemming	1962 – 1963	under Diefenbaker
2.	Martial Asselin	1963	under Diefenbaker
3.	John Robert Nicholson	April 22, 1963 – 1964	under Pearson
4.	Maurice Sauvé	1964 – 1966	under Pearson
Minister of Forestry and Rural Development
1.	Maurice Sauvé	1966 – 1968	
	Jean Marchand	1968 – 1969	
Minister of Fisheries and Forests
1.	Jack Davis	1969 – 1971	under Trudeau Sr.
Minister of Forestry (1990–95)
1.	Frank Oberle, Sr.	February 23, 1990 – June 24, 1993	under Brian Mulroney
2.	Bobbie Sparrow	June 25, 1993 – November 3, 1993	under Kim Campbell
3.	Anne McLellan	November 4, 1993 – January 11, 1995	under Jean Chrétien

== See also ==
- Natural Resources Canada
- List of forestry ministries
