= Minister of Mines and Technical Surveys =

The Minister of Mines and Technical Surveys was a position in the Canadian Cabinet from 1950 to 1966.

The former offices of Minister of Mines and Resources and Minister of Reconstruction and Supply were abolished by Statute 13 Geo. VI, c. 18, and the offices of the Minister of Citizenship and Immigration, Minister of Mines and Technical Surveys and Minister of Resources and Development created by Statutes 13 Geo. VI, c. 16, 17 and 18 respectively, each assented to on 10 Dec. 1949 and proclaimed in force on 18 Jan. 1950.

== Ministers 1950-1966 ==
1.	James Joseph McCann	Cabinet of St. Laurent	January 18, 1950 – December 12, 1950
2.	George Prudham	Cabinet of St. Laurent	December 13, 1950 – June 21, 1957
3.	Léon Balcer acting	Cabinet of Diefenbaker	June 21, 1957 – August 6, 1957
4.	Paul Comtois	Cabinet of Diefenbaker	August 7, 1957 – October 6, 1961
5.	Walter Gilbert Dinsdale acting	Cabinet of Diefenbaker	October 10, 1961 – December 27, 1961
6.	Jacques Flynn	Cabinet of Diefenbaker	December 28, 1961 – July 12, 1962
7.	Hugh John Flemming acting	Cabinet of Diefenbaker	July 18, 1962 – August 8, 1962
8.	Paul Martineau	Cabinet of Diefenbaker	August 9, 1962 – April 22, 1963
9.	William Moore Benidickson	Cabinet of Pearson	April 22, 1963 – July 6, 1965
10.	John Watson MacNaught	Cabinet of Pearson	July 7, 1965 – December 17, 1965
11.	Jean-Luc Pepin	Cabinet of Pearson	December 18, 1965 – September 30, 1966

The new position of Minister of Energy, Mines and Resources was created on October 1, 1966.
