= Minister of Northern and Arctic Affairs =

Minister of the Canadian Cabinet

- Ministre des Affaires du Nord et de l'Arctique
- Incumbent; Rebecca Chartrand since May 13, 2025
- Crown–Indigenous Relations and Northern Affairs Canada
- Style: The Honourable
- Member of: House of Commons; Privy Council; Cabinet
- Reports to: Parliament; Prime Minister
- Appointer: Monarch (represented by the governor general); on the advice of the prime minister
- Term length: At His Majesty's pleasure
- Precursor: Minister of Crown–Indigenous Relations and Northern Affairs
- Inaugural holder: Dan Vandal
- Formation: 20 November 2019
- Salary: CA$269,800 (2019)
- Website: www.rcaanc-cirnac.gc.ca

The minister of northern and arctic affairs (French: ministre des Affaires du Nord et de l'Arctique) is a minister of the Crown in the Canadian Cabinet.

In 1953, the role of Minister of Northern Affairs and National Resources was created as a formal successor to the Minister of Resources and Development, receiving the previous position's roles with an additional focus on territorial and Inuit relations. Similarly, the Department of Northern Affairs and National Resources was created in the same legislation to replace the previous Department of Resources and Development.

In 1966, the portfolio's responsibilities were divided between the new posts of Minister of Indian Affairs and Northern Development and Minister of Energy, Mines and Resources, which were given the majority of the northern affairs and national resources portfolios, respectively.

In 2019, the northern affairs portfolio of Crown–Indigenous Relations and Northern Affairs Canada (CIRNAC) was assigned back to a separate Minister of Northern Affairs. This position lasted until 2024, at which point responsibility for northern affairs was returned to the Minister of Crown–Indigenous Relations and Northern Affairs.

== List of ministers ==
No.	Portrait	Name	Term of office		Political party	Ministry
Minister of Northern Affairs and National Resources
1		Jean Lesage	16 December 1953	21 June 1957	Liberal	17 (St. Laurent)
2		Douglas Harkness	21 June 1957	18 August 1957	Progressive Conservative	18 (Diefenbaker)
		Vacant	19 August 1957	21 August 1957		18 (Diefenbaker)
3		Alvin Hamilton	22 August 1957	10 October 1960	Progressive Conservative	18 (Diefenbaker)
4		Walter Dinsdale	11 October 1960	22 April 1963	Progressive Conservative	18 (Diefenbaker)
5		Arthur Laing	22 December 1963	30 September 1966	Liberal	19 (Pearson)
Responsibilities under Minister of Indian Affairs and Northern Development (1966–2019) (Note: The role was referred to as Minister of Indian Affairs and Northern Development for most of this period (1966–2011), then evolved through a series of other titles including: Minister of Aboriginal Affairs and Northern Development (2011–2015); Minister of Indigenous and Northern Affairs (2015–2017); Minister of Crown–Indigenous Relations and Northern Affairs (2017–2018); Minister of Intergovernmental and Northern Affairs and Internal Trade (2018–2019))
Minister of Northern Affairs
6		Dan Vandal	20 November 2019	20 December 2024	Liberal	29 (J. Trudeau)
Responsibilities given to Minister of Crown–Indigenous Relations and Northern Affairs (2024–2025)
Minister of Northern and Arctic Affairs
7		Rebecca Chartrand	13 May 2025	present	Liberal	30 (Carney)
