= Defence Construction Canada =

Crown corporation

Defence Construction Canada (DCC; French: Construction de Défense Canada) is a Crown corporation owned by the Government of Canada.

DCC was created in 1951 to help build massive defence infrastructure during the Cold War. It was notably involved in building the Distant Early Warning Line, and is now involved in decommissioning it. It also became involved in building Expo 67 and the TransCanada pipeline. Until the 1990s, its services focused on the traditional areas of construction and construction contract management. In the last decade, it has expanded these offerings to include environmental, commissioning and facilities management services. Its only client is the Department of National Defence.
