= 30th Canadian Ministry =

Government of Canada since 2025

30th Canadian Ministry; 30^{e} conseil des ministres du Canada
- 30th Ministry of Canada

- Date formed: March 14, 2025

People and organizations
- Monarch: Charles III
- Governor General: Mary Simon; Louise Arbour
- Prime Minister: Mark Carney
- Prime Minister's history: Premiership of Mark Carney
- No. of ministers: 28 (cabinet ministers) + 10 (secretaries of state)
- Member party: Liberal
- Status in legislature: Minority (until April 13, 2026); Majority (since April 13, 2026)
- Opposition cabinet: 44th (2025); 45th (2025–present)
- Opposition party: Conservative
- Opposition leader: Pierre Poilievre (March–April 2025, August 2025–present); Andrew Scheer (May–August 2025)

History
- Incoming formation: 2025 Liberal leadership election
- Election: 2025
- Legislature terms: 44th Canadian Parliament; 45th Canadian Parliament
- Budget: 2025
- Predecessor: 29th Canadian Ministry

The Thirtieth Canadian Ministry or the Carney ministry is the ministry currently in office led by Prime Minister Mark Carney. It was formed on March 14, 2025, following the resignation of Prime Minister Justin Trudeau and Carney's victory in the Liberal leadership contest over former Deputy Prime Minister Chrystia Freeland. Initially, Carney reduced the size of the Cabinet from 37 ministers under Trudeau, to 24 ministers including himself. Following the 2025 federal election that returned the Liberals as a minority government, Carney revamped his Cabinet on May 13 with 29 ministers including himself, and appointed a further 10 secretaries of state, reviving a non-Cabinet ministerial rank used throughout the Chrétien Ministry and briefly during the Harper Ministry.

The 29th Canadian Ministry of Justin Trudeau had started a tradition of gender parity with an equal number of male and female ministers excluding the prime minister. The brief first Carney Cabinet from March to May 2025 had slightly more male than female ministers, but an equal number of male and female ministers excluding the prime minister was reinstituted in the post-election Cabinet in May.

== Lists of ministers ==
=== By minister ===
==== Current ministers ====
Portrait	Minister	Portfolio	Tenure
	Mark Carney	Prime Minister	March 14, 2025 – present
	Dominic LeBlanc	Minister of International Trade and Intergovernmental Affairs	March 14, 2025 – May 13, 2025
	Dominic LeBlanc	President of the King's Privy Council for Canada	March 14, 2025 – present
	Dominic LeBlanc	Minister responsible for Canada-U.S. Trade, Intergovernmental Affairs and One Canadian Economy	May 13, 2025 – present
	Dominic LeBlanc	Minister of Internal Trade	September 16, 2025 – present
	Mélanie Joly	Minister of Foreign Affairs and International Development	March 14, 2025 – May 13, 2025
	Mélanie Joly	Minister of Industry	May 13, 2025 – present
	Mélanie Joly	Minister responsible for Canada Economic Development for Quebec Regions	May 13, 2025 – present
	François-Philippe Champagne	Minister of Finance	March 14, 2025 – May 13, 2025
	François-Philippe Champagne	Minister of Finance and National Revenue	May 13, 2025 – present
	Anita Anand	Minister of Innovation, Science and Industry	March 14, 2025 – May 13, 2025
	Anita Anand	Minister of Foreign Affairs	May 13, 2025 – present
	Patty Hajdu	Minister of Indigenous Services	March 14, 2025 – May 13, 2025
	Patty Hajdu	Minister of Jobs and Families	May 13, 2025 – present
	Patty Hajdu	Minister responsible for the Federal Economic Development Agency for Northern Ontario	May 13, 2025 – present
	Gary Anandasangaree	Minister of Crown–Indigenous Relations and Northern Affairs	March 14, 2025 – May 13, 2025
	Gary Anandasangaree	Minister of Justice and Attorney General	March 14, 2025 – May 13, 2025
	Gary Anandasangaree	Minister of Public Safety	May 13, 2025 – present
	Rechie Valdez	Chief Government Whip	March 14, 2025 – May 13, 2025
	Rechie Valdez	Minister of Women and Gender Equality	May 13, 2025 – present
	Rechie Valdez	Secretary of State (Small Business and Tourism)	May 13, 2025 – present
	Steven MacKinnon	Minister of Jobs and Families	March 14, 2025 – May 13, 2025
	Steven MacKinnon	Leader of the Government in the House of Commons	May 13, 2025 – present
	Steven MacKinnon	Minister of Transport	September 16, 2025 – present
	David McGuinty	Minister of Public Safety and Emergency Preparedness	March 14, 2025 – May 13, 2025
	David McGuinty	Minister of National Defence	May 13, 2025 – present
	Joanne Thompson	Minister of Fisheries, Oceans and the Canadian Coast Guard	March 14, 2025 – May 13, 2025
	Joanne Thompson	Minister of Fisheries	May 13, 2025 – present
	Sean Fraser	Minister of Justice and Attorney General	May 13, 2025 – present
	Sean Fraser	Minister responsible for the Atlantic Canada Opportunities Agency	May 13, 2025 – present
	Shafqat Ali	President of the Treasury Board	May 13, 2025 – present
	Rebecca Alty	Minister of Crown–Indigenous Relations	May 13, 2025 – present
	Rebecca Chartrand	Minister of Northern and Arctic Affairs	May 13, 2025 – present
	Rebecca Chartrand	Minister responsible for the Canadian Northern Economic Development Agency	May 13, 2025 – present
	Julie Dabrusin	Minister of Environment and Climate Change	May 13, 2025 – December 1, 2025
	Julie Dabrusin	Minister of the Environment, Climate Change and Nature	December 1, 2025 – present
	Mandy Gull-Masty	Minister of Indigenous Services	May 13, 2025 – present
	Tim Hodgson	Minister of Energy and Natural Resources	May 13, 2025 – present
	Joël Lightbound	Minister of Government Transformation, Public Services and Procurement	May 13, 2025 – present
	Heath MacDonald	Minister of Agriculture and Agri-Food	May 13, 2025 – present
	Jill McKnight	Minister of Veterans Affairs; Associate Minister of National Defence	May 13, 2025 – present
	Lena Diab	Minister of Immigration, Refugees and Citizenship	May 13, 2025 – present
	Marjorie Michel	Minister of Health	May 13, 2025 – present
	Eleanor Olszewski	Minister of Emergency Management and Community Resilience	May 13, 2025 – present
	Eleanor Olszewski	Minister responsible for Prairies Economic Development Canada	May 13, 2025 – present
	Gregor Robertson	Minister of Housing and Infrastructure	May 13, 2025 – present
	Gregor Robertson	Minister responsible for the Pacific Economic Development Agency of Canada	May 13, 2025 – present
	Maninder Sidhu	Minister of International Trade	May 13, 2025 – present
	Evan Solomon	Minister of Artificial Intelligence and Digital Innovation	May 13, 2025 – present
	Evan Solomon	Minister responsible for the Federal Economic Development Agency for Southern Ontario	May 13, 2025 – present
	Marc Miller	Minister of Canadian Identity and Culture	December 1, 2025 – present
	Marc Miller	Minister responsible for Official Languages	December 1, 2025 – present

==== Former ministers ====
Portrait	Minister	Portfolio	Tenure
	Bill Blair	Minister of National Defence	March 14, 2025 – May 13, 2025
	Jonathan Wilkinson	Minister of Energy and Natural Resources	March 14, 2025 – May 13, 2025
	Ginette Petitpas Taylor	President of the Treasury Board	March 14, 2025 – May 13, 2025
	Kamal Khera	Minister of Health	March 14, 2025 – May 13, 2025
	Terry Duguid	Minister of Environment and Climate Change	March 14, 2025 – May 13, 2025
	Nate Erskine-Smith	Minister of Housing, Infrastructure and Communities	March 14, 2025 – May 13, 2025
	Rachel Bendayan	Minister of Immigration, Refugees and Citizenship	March 14, 2025 – May 13, 2025
	Élisabeth Brière	Minister of Veterans Affairs	March 14, 2025 – May 13, 2025
	Élisabeth Brière	Minister responsible for the Canada Revenue Agency	March 14, 2025 – May 13, 2025
	Arielle Kayabaga	Leader of the Government in the House of Commons	March 14, 2025 – May 13, 2025
	Arielle Kayabaga	Minister of Democratic Institutions	March 14, 2025 – May 13, 2025
	Kody Blois	Minister of Agriculture and Agri-Food and Rural Economic Development	March 14, 2025 – May 13, 2025
	Ali Ehsassi	Minister of Government Transformation, Public Services and Procurement	March 14, 2025 – May 13, 2025
	Chrystia Freeland	Minister of Transport and Internal Trade	March 14, 2025 – September 16, 2025
	Steven Guilbeault	Minister of Canadian Culture and Identity, Parks Canada and Quebec Lieutenant	March 14, 2025 – May 13, 2025
	Steven Guilbeault	Minister of Canadian Identity and Culture	May 13, 2025 – November 27, 2025

=== By portfolio ===
Portfolio	Minister	Tenure
Prime Minister	Mark Carney	March 14, 2025 – present
Associate Minister of National Defence	Jill McKnight	May 13, 2025 – present
Chief Government Whip (Note: Cabinet rank until May 13, 2025)	Rechie Valdez	March 14, 2025 – May 13, 2025
Leader of the Government in the House of Commons	Arielle Kayabaga	March 14, 2025 – May 13, 2025
Leader of the Government in the House of Commons	Steven MacKinnon	May 13, 2025 – present
Minister of Agriculture and Agri-Food and Rural Economic Development	Kody Blois	March 14, 2025 – May 13, 2025
Minister of Agriculture and Agri-Food	Heath MacDonald	May 13, 2025 – present
Minister of Artificial Intelligence and Digital Innovation	Evan Solomon	May 13, 2025 – present
Minister responsible for the Atlantic Canada Opportunities Agency	Sean Fraser	May 13, 2025 – present
Minister responsible for Canada Economic Development for Quebec Regions	Mélanie Joly	May 13, 2025 – present
Minister responsible for the Canada Revenue Agency	Élisabeth Brière	March 14, 2025 – May 13, 2025
Minister responsible for Canada-U.S. Trade, Intergovernmental Affairs and One Canadian Economy	Dominic LeBlanc	May 13, 2025 – present
Minister of Canadian Culture and Identity, Parks Canada and Quebec Lieutenant	Steven Guilbeault	March 14, 2025 – May 13, 2025
Minister of Canadian Identity and Culture	Steven Guilbeault	May 13, 2025 – November 27, 2025
Minister of Canadian Identity and Culture	Marc Miller	December 1, 2025 – present
Minister responsible for Official Languages	Marc Miller	December 1, 2025 – present
Minister responsible for the Canadian Northern Economic Development Agency	Rebecca Chartrand	May 13, 2025 – present
Minister of Crown–Indigenous Relations and Northern Affairs	Gary Anandasangaree	March 14, 2025 – May 13, 2025
Minister of Crown–Indigenous Relations	Rebecca Alty	May 13, 2025 – present
Minister of Democratic Institutions	Arielle Kayabaga	March 14, 2025 – May 13, 2025
Minister of Emergency Management and Community Resilience	Eleanor Olszewski	May 13, 2025 – present
Minister of Energy and Natural Resources	Jonathan Wilkinson	March 14, 2025 – May 13, 2025
Minister of Energy and Natural Resources	Tim Hodgson	May 13, 2025 – present
Minister of Environment and Climate Change	Terry Duguid	March 14, 2025 – May 13, 2025
Minister of Environment and Climate Change	Julie Dabrusin	May 13, 2025 – December 1, 2025
Minister of the Environment, Climate Change and Nature	Julie Dabrusin	December 1, 2025 – present
Minister responsible for the Federal Economic Development Agency for Northern Ontario	Patty Hajdu	May 13, 2025 – present
Minister responsible for the Federal Economic Development Agency for Southern Ontario	Evan Solomon	May 13, 2025 – present
Minister of Finance	François-Philippe Champagne	March 14, 2025 – May 13, 2025
Minister of Finance and National Revenue	François-Philippe Champagne	May 13, 2025 – present
Minister of Fisheries, Oceans and the Canadian Coast Guard	Joanne Thompson	March 14, 2025 – May 13, 2025
Minister of Fisheries	Joanne Thompson	May 13, 2025 – present
Minister of Foreign Affairs and International Development	Mélanie Joly	March 14, 2025 – May 13, 2025
Minister of Foreign Affairs	Anita Anand	May 13, 2025 – present
Minister of Government Transformation, Public Services and Procurement	Ali Ehsassi	March 14, 2025 – May 13, 2025
Minister of Government Transformation, Public Services and Procurement	Joël Lightbound	May 13, 2025 – present
Minister of Health	Kamal Khera	March 14, 2025 – May 13, 2025
Minister of Health	Marjorie Michel	May 13, 2025 – present
Minister of Housing, Infrastructure and Communities	Nate Erskine-Smith	March 14, 2025 – May 13, 2025
Minister of Housing and Infrastructure	Gregor Robertson	May 13, 2025 – present
Minister of Immigration, Refugees and Citizenship	Rachel Bendayan	March 14, 2025 – May 13, 2025
Minister of Immigration, Refugees and Citizenship	Lena Diab	May 13, 2025 – present
Minister of Indigenous Services	Patty Hajdu	March 14, 2025 – May 13, 2025
Minister of Indigenous Services	Mandy Gull-Masty	May 13, 2025 – present
Minister of Innovation, Science and Industry	Anita Anand	March 14, 2025 – May 13, 2025
Minister of Industry	Mélanie Joly	May 13, 2025 – present
Minister of International Trade and Intergovernmental Affairs	Dominic LeBlanc	March 14, 2025 – May 13, 2025
Minister of Internal Trade	Chrystia Freeland	March 14, 2025 – September 16, 2025
Minister of Internal Trade	Dominic LeBlanc	September 16, 2025 – present
Minister of International Trade	Maninder Sidhu	May 13, 2025 – present
Minister of Jobs and Families	Steven MacKinnon	March 14, 2025 – May 13, 2025
Minister of Jobs and Families	Patty Hajdu	May 13, 2025 – present
Minister of Justice and Attorney General	Gary Anandasangaree	March 14, 2025 – May 13, 2025
Minister of Justice and Attorney General	Sean Fraser	May 13, 2025 – present
Minister of National Defence	Bill Blair	March 14, 2025 – May 13, 2025
Minister of National Defence	David McGuinty	May 13, 2025 – present
Minister of Northern and Arctic Affairs	Rebecca Chartrand	May 13, 2025 – present
Minister responsible for the Pacific Economic Development Agency of Canada	Gregor Robertson	May 13, 2025 – present
Minister responsible for Prairies Economic Development Canada	Eleanor Olszewski	May 13, 2025 – present
Minister of Public Safety and Emergency Preparedness	David McGuinty	March 14, 2025 – May 13, 2025
Minister of Public Safety	Gary Anandasangaree	May 13, 2025 – present
Minister of Transport	Chrystia Freeland	March 14, 2025 – September 16, 2025
Minister of Transport	Steven MacKinnon	September 16, 2025 – present
Minister of Veterans Affairs	Élisabeth Brière	March 14, 2025 – May 13, 2025
Minister of Veterans Affairs	Jill McKnight	May 13, 2025 – present
Minister of Women and Gender Equality	Rechie Valdez	May 13, 2025 – present
President of the King's Privy Council for Canada	Dominic LeBlanc	March 14, 2025 – present
President of the Treasury Board	Ginette Petitpas Taylor	March 14, 2025 – May 13, 2025
President of the Treasury Board	Shafqat Ali	May 13, 2025 – present

== Lists of Secretaries of State ==
Secretaries of State are considered part of the ministry but not part of Cabinet. The practice of appointing Secretaries of State to assist more senior ministers was revived during the May 13, 2025 Cabinet shuffle, having previously been used during the governments of Jean Chrétien and Stephen Harper.

=== By secretary ===
Portrait	Minister	Portfolio	Tenure
	Buckley Belanger	Secretary of State (Rural Development)	May 13, 2025 – present
	Stephen Fuhr	Secretary of State (Defence Procurement)	May 13, 2025 – present
	Anna Gainey	Secretary of State (Children and Youth)	May 13, 2025 – present
	Wayne Long	Secretary of State (Canada Revenue Agency and financial institutions)	May 13, 2025 – present
	Stephanie McLean	Secretary of State (Seniors)	May 13, 2025 – present
	Nathalie Provost	Secretary of State (Nature)	May 13, 2025 – present
	Ruby Sahota	Secretary of State (Combatting Crime)	May 13, 2025 – present
	Randeep Sarai	Secretary of State (International Development)	May 13, 2025 – present
	Adam van Koeverden	Secretary of State (Sport)	May 13, 2025 – present
	John Zerucelli	Secretary of State (Labour)	May 13, 2025 – present

=== By portfolio ===
Portfolio	Minister	Tenure
Secretary of State (Canada Revenue Agency and financial institutions)	Wayne Long	May 13, 2025 – present
Secretary of State (Children and Youth)	Anna Gainey	May 13, 2025 – present
Secretary of State (Combatting Crime)	Ruby Sahota	May 13, 2025 – present
Secretary of State (Defence Procurement)	Stephen Fuhr	May 13, 2025 – present
Secretary of State (International Development)	Randeep Sarai	May 13, 2025 – present
Secretary of State (Labour)	John Zerucelli	May 13, 2025 – present
Secretary of State (Nature)	Nathalie Provost	May 13, 2025 – present
Secretary of State (Rural Development)	Buckley Belanger	May 13, 2025 – present
Secretary of State (Seniors)	Stephanie McLean	May 13, 2025 – present
Secretary of State (Small Business and Tourism)	Rechie Valdez (Note: A member of Cabinet by virtue of her concurrent role as Minister of Women and Gender Equality)	May 13, 2025 – present
Secretary of State (Sport)	Adam van Koeverden	May 13, 2025 – present

== Changes compared to the Twenty-Ninth Ministry ==
The following positions were altered compared to the end of the Twenty-Ninth Ministry:

=== Merged positions ===
- Minister of Agriculture and Agri-Food and Rural Economic Development: Previously two posts, the Minister of Agriculture and Agri-Food and the Minister of Rural Economic Development.
- Minister of Canadian Culture and Identity, Parks Canada and Quebec Lieutenant: A new position combining the previous post of Minister of Canadian Heritage with the responsibility for Parks Canada, previously held by the Minister of Environment and Climate Change.
- Minister of Jobs and Families: Previously two posts, the Minister of Employment, Workforce Development and Labour and the Minister of Families, Children and Social Development.
- Minister of Foreign Affairs and International Development: Previously two posts, the Minister of Foreign Affairs and the Minister of International Development.
- Minister of International Trade and Intergovernmental Affairs: A new position combining the previous post of Minister of Export Promotion, International Trade and Economic Development with the responsibility for intergovernmental affairs, previously held by the Minister of Finance and Intergovernmental Affairs.
- Minister of Public Safety and Emergency Preparedness: Previously two posts, the Minister of Public Safety and the Minister of Emergency Preparedness.

=== Discontinued positions ===
- Minister of Citizens' Services – Merged into the position of Minister of Jobs and Families.
- Minister of Diversity, Inclusion and Persons with Disabilities – Merged into the position of Minister of Canadian Culture and Identity, Parks Canada and Quebec Lieutenant.
- Minister of Mental Health and Addictions – Merged into the position of Minister of Health.
- Minister of Official Languages - Merged into the position of Minister of Canadian Culture and Identity, Parks Canada and Quebec Lieutenant.
- Minister of Seniors - Reclassified as a Secretary of State
- Minister of Small Business - Reclassified as a Secretary of State
- Minister of Sport - Reclassified as a Secretary of State
- Minister of Tourism - Reclassified as a Secretary of State
- Associate Minister of Health
- Associate Minister of Public Safety

=== Renamed positions ===
- Minister of National Revenue: renamed the Minister responsible for the Canada Revenue Agency
- Minister of Public Services and Procurement: renamed the Minister of Government Transformation, Public Services and Procurement
- Minister for Women and Gender Equality and Youth: renamed the Minister of Women and Gender Equality

== Cabinet shuffles ==
=== May 2025 shuffle ===
On May 13, 2025, Carney carried out a significant reshuffle of his ministry following the 2025 federal election. 11 ministers were dropped from Cabinet while 16 were added, bringing the size of cabinet to 28 members, plus Carney himself.

An additional 10 Secretaries of State were appointed to the ministry, though they are not members of the Cabinet itself, reviving a practice previously used during the governments of Jean Chrétien and Stephen Harper.

Colour key
- Joined the Cabinet
- Joined the ministry, but not the Cabinet, as a Secretary of State
- Left the Cabinet

Minister	Position before reshuffle	Result of reshuffle
Shafqat Ali	Backbench MP	Became President of the Treasury Board
Rebecca Alty	None (Note: Newly elected in the 2025 federal election)	Became Minister of Crown–Indigenous Relations
Anita Anand	Minister of Innovation, Science and Industry	Became Minister of Foreign Affairs
Gary Anandasangaree	Minister of Crown–Indigenous Relations and Northern Affairs and Minister of Justice and Attorney General	Became Minister of Public Safety
Buckley Belanger	None	Became Secretary of State (Rural Development)
Rachel Bendayan	Minister of Immigration, Refugees and Citizenship	Dropped from Cabinet, became Parliamentary Secretary to the Prime Minister
Bill Blair	Minister of National Defence	Dropped from Cabinet
Kody Blois	Minister of Agriculture and Agri-Food and Rural Economic Development	Dropped from Cabinet, became Parliamentary Secretary to the Prime Minister
Élisabeth Brière	Minister of Veterans Affairs and Minister responsible for the Canada Revenue Agency	Dropped from Cabinet, became Deputy Chief Government Whip
François-Philippe Champagne	Minister of Finance	Became Minister of Finance and National Revenue
Rebecca Chartrand	None	Became Minister of Northern and Arctic Affairs and Minister responsible for the Canadian Northern Economic Development Agency
Julie Dabrusin	Parliamentary Secretary to the Minister of Energy and Natural Resources and Minister of Environment and Climate Change	Became Minister of Environment and Climate Change
Lena Diab	Backbench MP	Became Minister of Immigration, Refugees and Citizenship
Terry Duguid	Minister of Environment and Climate Change	Dropped from Cabinet, became Chair of the Standing Committee on Natural Resources
Ali Ehsassi	Minister of Government Transformation, Public Services and Procurement	Dropped from Cabinet, became Parliamentary Secretary to the President of the King's Privy Council for Canada and Minister responsible for Canada-U.S. Trade, Intergovernmental Affairs and One Canadian Economy (Canada-U.S. Trade)
Nate Erskine-Smith	Minister of Housing, Infrastructure and Communities	Dropped from Cabinet
Sean Fraser	Backbench MP	Became Minister of Justice and Attorney General and Minister responsible for the Atlantic Canada Opportunities Agency
Stephen Fuhr	None	Became Secretary of State (Defence Procurement)
Anna Gainey	Backbench MP	Became Secretary of State (Children and Youth)
Steven Guilbeault	Minister of Canadian Culture and Identity, Parks Canada and Quebec Lieutenant	Position renamed Minister of Canadian Identity and Culture
Mandy Gull-Masty	None	Became Minister of Indigenous Services
Patty Hajdu	Minister of Indigenous Services	Became Minister of Jobs and Families and Minister responsible for the Federal Economic Development Agency for Northern Ontario
Tim Hodgson	None	Became Minister of Energy and Natural Resources
Mélanie Joly	Minister of Foreign Affairs and International Development	Became Minister of Industry and Minister responsible for Canada Economic Development for Quebec Regions
Arielle Kayabaga	Leader of the Government in the House of Commons and Minister of Democratic Institutions	Dropped from Cabinet, became Deputy Leader of the Government in the House of Commons
Kamal Khera	Minister of Health	Dropped from Cabinet after losing re-election
Dominic LeBlanc	Minister of International Trade and Intergovernmental Affairs	Became Minister responsible for Canada-U.S. Trade, Intergovernmental Affairs and One Canadian Economy
Joël Lightbound	Chair of the Standing Committee on Industry and Technology	Became Minister of Government Transformation, Public Services and Procurement
Wayne Long	Backbench MP	Became Secretary of State (Canada Revenue Agency and financial institutions)
Heath MacDonald	Backbench MP	Became Minister of Agriculture and Agri-Food
Steven MacKinnon	Minister of Jobs and Families	Became Leader of the Government in the House of Commons
David McGuinty	Minister of Public Safety and Emergency Preparedness	Became Minister of National Defence
Jill McKnight	None	Became Minister of Veterans Affairs and Associate Minister of National Defence
Stephanie McLean	None	Became Secretary of State (Seniors)
Marjorie Michel	None	Became Minister of Health
Eleanor Olszewski	None	Became Minister of Emergency Management and Community Resilience and Minister responsible for Prairies Economic Development Canada
Ginette Petitpas Taylor	President of the Treasury Board	Dropped from Cabinet
Nathalie Provost	None	Became Secretary of State (Nature)
Gregor Robertson	None	Became Minister of Housing and Infrastructure and Minister responsible for the Pacific Economic Development Agency of Canada
Ruby Sahota	Backbench MP	Became Secretary of State (Combatting Crime)
Randeep Sarai	Parliamentary Secretary to the Minister of Veterans Affairs and Associate Minister of National Defence	Became Secretary of State (International Development)
Maninder Sidhu	Parliamentary Secretary to the Minister of Export Promotion, International Trade and Economic Development	Became Minister of International Trade
Evan Solomon	None	Became Minister of Artificial Intelligence and Digital Innovation and Minister responsible for the Federal Economic Development Agency for Southern Ontario
Joanne Thompson	Minister of Fisheries, Oceans and the Canadian Coast Guard	Position renamed Minister of Fisheries
Rechie Valdez	Chief Government Whip	Became Minister of Women and Gender Equality and Secretary of State (Small Business and Tourism)
Adam van Koeverden	Parliamentary Secretary to the Minister of Environment and Climate Change and Minister of Sport and Minister responsible for Prairies Economic Development Canada	Became Secretary of State (Sport)
Jonathan Wilkinson	Minister of Energy and Natural Resources	Dropped from Cabinet
John Zerucelli	None	Became Secretary of State (Labour)

=== September 2025 shuffle ===
A minor shuffle took place on September 16, 2025, following the resignation of Chrystia Freeland to become special representative for the reconstruction of Ukraine.

Colour key
- Left the Cabinet

Minister	Position before reshuffle	Result of reshuffle
Chrystia Freeland	Minister of Transport and Internal Trade	Resigned from Cabinet, became Special Representative for the Reconstruction of Ukraine
Dominic LeBlanc	Minister responsible for Canada-U.S. Trade, Intergovernmental Affairs and One Canadian Economy	Gained additional role as Minister of Internal Trade
Steven MacKinnon	Leader of the Government in the House of Commons	Gained additional role as Minister of Transport

=== December 2025 shuffle ===
A minor shuffle took place on December 1, 2025, following the resignation of Steven Guilbeault four days earlier.

Colour key
- Joined the Cabinet
- Left the Cabinet

Minister	Position before reshuffle	Result of reshuffle
Steven Guilbeault	Minister of Canadian Identity and Culture and Minister responsible for Official Languages	Resigned from Cabinet
Marc Miller	Backbench MP	Became Minister of Canadian Identity and Culture and Minister responsible for Official Languages
Julie Dabrusin	Minister of Environment and Climate Change	Titled remained the same, gained additional responsibility for Nature

== Notes ==
Ministries of Canada
Preceded by 29th Canadian Ministry	30th Canadian Ministry; 2025–present	Incumbent
