= Steven MacKinnon =

Canadian politician (born 1966)

The Honourable Steven MacKinnon PC MP
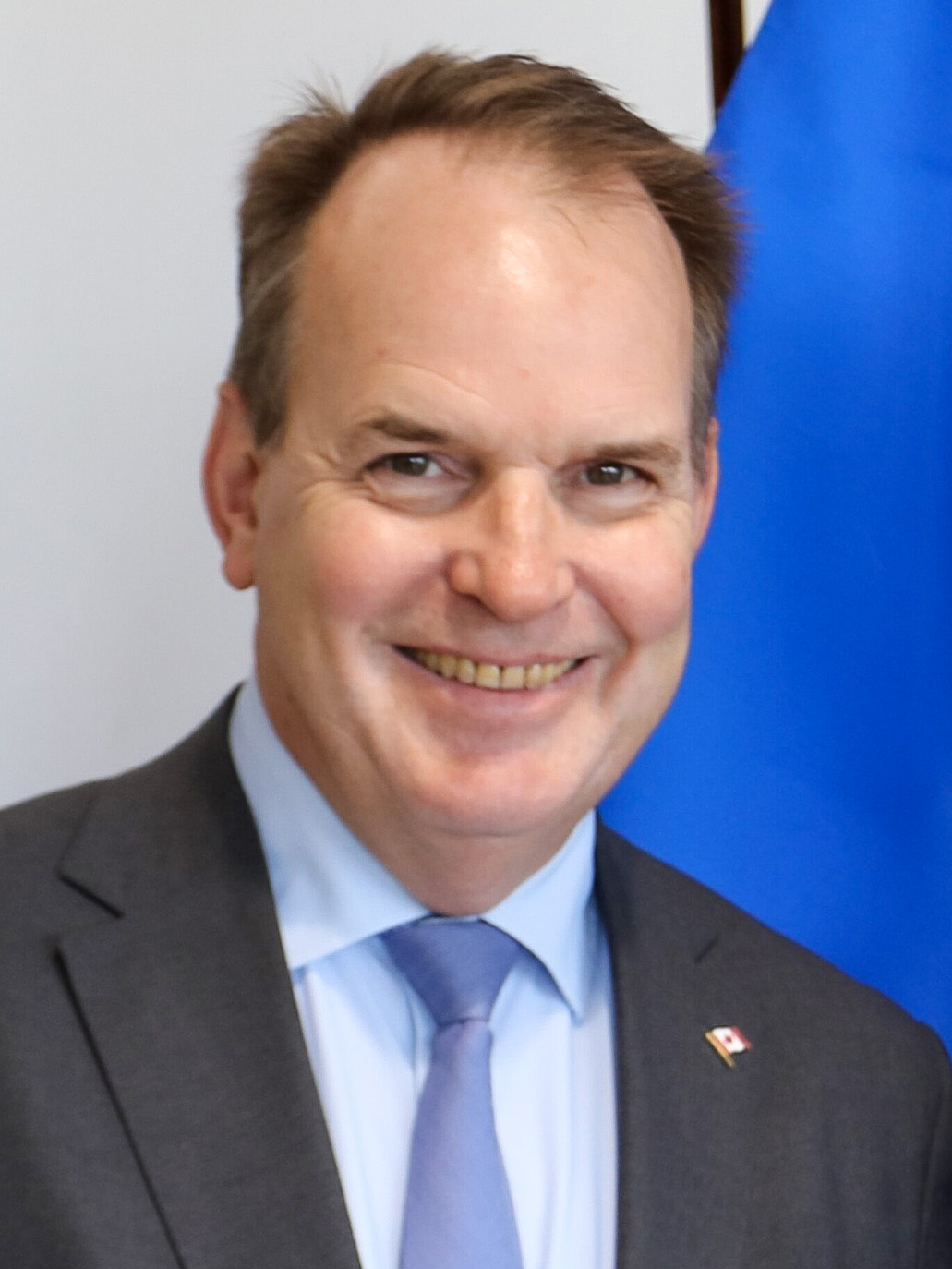
- MacKinnon in 2025

Leader of the Government in the House of Commons
- Incumbent
- Assumed office May 13, 2025
- Prime Minister: Mark Carney
- Preceded by: Arielle Kayabaga
- In office January 24, 2025 – March 14, 2025
- Prime Minister: Justin Trudeau
- Preceded by: Karina Gould
- Succeeded by: Arielle Kayabaga
- Interim; January 8, 2024 – July 19, 2024 (Note: MacKinnon served as interim Leader of the Government in the House of Commons from January 8 to July 19, 2024, filling in for Karina Gould while she was on her maternity leave.)
- Prime Minister: Justin Trudeau
- Preceded by: Karina Gould
- Succeeded by: Karina Gould

Minister of Transport
- Incumbent
- Assumed office September 16, 2025
- Prime Minister: Mark Carney
- Preceded by: Chrystia Freeland (Transport and Internal Trade)

Minister of Jobs and Families
- In office March 14, 2025 – May 13, 2025
- Prime Minister: Mark Carney
- Preceded by: Position established (Note: The role of Minister of Jobs and Families consolidated all positions responsible for Employment and Social Development Canada into a single post. Previously, the department was divided between the following roles: Minister of Citizens' Services (Terry Beech); Minister of Diversity, Inclusion and Persons with Disabilities (Kamal Khera); Minister of Employment, Workforce Development and Labour (MacKinnon); Minister of Families, Children and Social Development (Jenna Sudds); Minister of Seniors (Joanne Thompson))
- Succeeded by: Patty Hajdu

Minister of Employment, Workforce Development and Labour
- In office December 20, 2024 – March 14, 2025
- Prime Minister: Justin Trudeau
- Preceded by: Ginette Petitpas Taylor (Employment, Workforce Development, and Official Languages); Himself (Labour)
- Succeeded by: Position abolished

Minister of Labour and Seniors
- In office July 19, 2024 – December 20, 2024
- Prime Minister: Justin Trudeau
- Preceded by: Seamus O'Regan
- Succeeded by: Himself (Labour); Joanne Thompson (Seniors)

Chief Government Whip
- In office October 28, 2021 – January 8, 2024
- Prime Minister: Justin Trudeau
- Preceded by: Mark Holland
- Succeeded by: Ruby Sahota

Member of Parliament for Gatineau
- Incumbent
- Assumed office October 19, 2015
- Preceded by: Françoise Boivin

Personal details
- Born: Steven Garrett MacKinnon; September 28, 1966 (age 60) Charlottetown, Prince Edward Island, Canada
- Party: Liberal
- Education: Queen's University; Université de Moncton
- Occupation: Politician; businessman

Steven Garrett MacKinnon (born September 28, 1966) is a Canadian politician who has been the member of Parliament (MP) for Gatineau since 2015. A member of the Liberal Party, MacKinnon is the Government House Leader and Minister of Transport.

== Early life and education ==
MacKinnon was born in Charlottetown, Prince Edward Island, and studied business at the Université de Moncton and Queen's University.

In addition to his career in politics, MacKinnon has worked in business and public affairs. From 2007 to 2015, he was Senior Vice-President and National Practice Leader at a global public affairs consultancy firm, where he led teams and major projects in mergers and acquisitions and financial communications.

== Political career ==
=== As political advisor ===
MacKinnon served as executive assistant and an advisor to New Brunswick Premier Frank McKenna from 1988 to 1995.

A supporter and advisor to former Prime Minister Paul Martin, MacKinnon was named Deputy National Director upon Martin's election as party leader and Prime Minister. He acted as the party's communications chief during the 2004 election, and was promoted to national director of the Liberal Party of Canada after the election. In that role, he oversaw an overhaul of the party's constitution and the last competitive leadership contest decided through a delegated convention, both cumulating at the party's convention held in Montreal in December 2006 where fourth place contender Stéphane Dion emerged as the surprised victor. MacKinnon announced his resignation as national director in the week immediately following the convention. He later served as the returning officer for the 2013 federal leadership election.

=== Parliamentary career ===
MacKinnon first contested for a seat in parliament in the 2011 federal election in Gatineau, finishing third and almost 50 points behind Françoise Boivin, a former Liberal MP running for the New Democratic Party who secured 62% of the votes, and the then-incumbent Bloc Quebecois MP Richard Nadeau by just over 1 point.

Four years later at the 2015 election, MacKinnon returned and defeated Boivin by a 2-to-1 margin. He was reelected in 2019 and 2021 with similar margins against Bloc Québécois rival Geneviève Nadeau.

MacKinnon was named Parliamentary Secretary to the Minister of Public Services and Procurement in January 2017, and with the exception for the campaign period in 2019 held the role continuously under three ministers until the dissolution of parliament prior to the 2021 election.

=== Frontbench career ===
Following the 2021 election, MacKinnon was appointed by Prime Minister Justin Trudeau as Chief Government Whip and was sworn in as a Privy Councillor.

He was promoted to cabinet in January 2024 on an interim basis as Leader of the Government in the House of Commons during the parental leave of the incoming House Leader Karina Gould. He was made a full member of cabinet in July as Minister of Labour and Minister of Seniors. In the cabinet shuffle that took place at the height of the 2024–2025 Canadian political crisis, MacKinnon relinquished the senior portfolio and consolidated other workforce related portfolios to become the Minister of Employment, Workforce Development and Labour.

In the two weeks following the resignation of Prime Minister Justin Trudeau, MacKinnon publicly explored a bid in the 2025 Liberal Party of Canada leadership election, but opted not to enter the race citing the short duration of the race. He later endorsed the candidacy of former Bank of Canada governor Mark Carney. On January 25, MacKinnon was appointed Leader of the Government in the House of Commons of Canada after Karina Gould resigned from cabinet to run in the leadership race; MacKinnon had previously stood in for her during her maternity leave the previous year.

On March 14, 2025, upon the beginning of the 30th Canadian Ministry, MacKinnon was appointed Minister of Jobs and Families by new Prime Minister Mark Carney. He was later appointed as the permanent Leader of the Government in the House of Commons on May 13, 2025. Following the resignation of Chrystia Freeland, he was appointed as Minister of Transport on September 16, 2025. After the government achieved a majority in the House of Commons in April 2026, MacKinnon moved to change the standing orders for lower house committees, with Liberal MPs holding a majority in those committees.

== Electoral record ==
2025 Canadian federal election: Gatineau
Party	Candidate	Votes	%	±%	Expenditures
Liberal	Steven MacKinnon	34,751	60.54	+10.49	$94,914.50
Conservative	Kethlande Pierre	10,982	19.13	+8.02	$20,982.21
Bloc Québécois	Richard Nadeau	9,373	16.33	–7.09	$31,981.46
New Democratic	Daniel Simoncic	1,615	2.81	–5.81	none listed
People's	Mathieu Saint-Jean	505	0.88	–3.17	$513.91
Marxist–Leninist	Pierre Soublière	173	0.30	+0.20	$0.00
Total valid votes/expense limit		57,399	98.91	–	$131,410.18
Total rejected ballots		633	1.09		
Turnout		58,032	68.20		
Eligible voters		85,086			
Liberal notional hold		Swing		+1.24	
Source: Elections Canada
Note: number of eligible voters does not include voting day registrations.

2021 Canadian federal election: Gatineau
Party	Candidate	Votes	%	±%	Expenditures
Liberal	Steven MacKinnon	26,267	50.0	-2.1	$55,420.93
Bloc Québécois	Geneviève Nadeau	12,278	23.4	+2.0	$13,121.18
Conservative	Joel Bernard	5,752	11.0	+0.7	$3,144.49
New Democratic	Fernanda Rengel	4,508	8.6	-2.4	$51.11
People's	Mathieu Saint-Jean	2,264	4.3	+3.3	$4,401.73
Green	Rachid Jemmah	783	1.5	-2.6	$0.00
Free	Luc Lavoie	411	0.8	N/A	$564.48
Rhinoceros	Sébastien Grenier	178	0.3	N/A	$0.00
Marxist–Leninist	Pierre Soublière	56	0.1	±0.0	$0.00
Total valid votes/expense limit		52,497	98.5	–	$113,382.26
Total rejected ballots		818	1.5		
Turnout		53,315	63.8		
Registered voters		83,618			
Liberal hold		Swing		-2.0	
Source: Elections Canada

2019 Canadian federal election: Gatineau
Party	Candidate	Votes	%	±%	Expenditures
Liberal	Steven MacKinnon	29,084	52.1	-1.66	$67,009.65
Bloc Québécois	Geneviève Nadeau	11,926	21.4	+11.96	none listed
New Democratic	Eric Chaurette	6,128	11.0	-15.56	$24,553.38
Conservative	Sylvie Goneau	5,745	10.3	+2.11	$16,427.02
Green	Guy Dostaler	2,264	4.1	+2.47	$0.00
People's	Mario-Roberto Lam	560	1.0		$1,439.79
Marxist–Leninist	Pierre Soublière	76	0.1	-0.06	$0.00
Total valid votes/expense limit		55,783	100.0		
Total rejected ballots		787			
Turnout		56,570	67.0		
Eligible voters		84,463			
Liberal hold		Swing		-6.81	
Source: Elections Canada

2015 Canadian federal election: Gatineau
Party	Candidate	Votes	%	±%	Expenditures
Liberal	Steve MacKinnon	31,076	53.76	+39.96	–
New Democratic	Françoise Boivin	15,352	26.56	-35.57	–
Bloc Québécois	Philippe Boily	5,455	9.44	-5.49	–
Conservative	Luc Angers	4,733	8.19	+0.18	–
Green	Guy Dostaler	942	1.63	+0.49	–
Independent	Guy J. Bellavance	148	0.26	–	–
Marxist–Leninist	Pierre Soublière	94	0.16	–	–
Total valid votes/Expense limit		57,800	100.0		$221,304.70
Total rejected ballots		522	–	–	
Turnout		58,322	–	–	
Eligible voters		83,651			
Source: Elections Canada

2011 Canadian federal election: Gatineau
Party	Candidate	Votes	%	±%	Expenditures
New Democratic	Françoise Boivin	35,262	61.83	+35.71	
Bloc Québécois	Richard Nadeau	8,619	15.11	-14.04	
Liberal	Steve MacKinnon	7,975	13.98	-11.34	
Conservative	Jennifer Gearey	4,532	7.95	-8.86	
Green	Jonathan Meijer	639	1.12	-1.45	
Total valid votes/Expense limit		57,027	100.00		
Total rejected ballots		365	0.64		
Turnout		57,392	64.36		
Eligible voters		89,171			

== Notes ==
29th Canadian Ministry (2015–2025) – Cabinet of Justin Trudeau
Cabinet post (1)
Predecessor	Office	Successor
Seamus O'Regan	Minister of Labour; July 19, 2024 – March 14, 2025	Position dissolved
Order of precedence
Preceded by Rechie Valdez as Member of the Cabinet	Order of Precedence of Canada as Member of the Cabinet	Succeeded by David McGuinty as Member of the Cabinet
