= Minister of Employment, Workforce Development and Official Languages =

Canadian cabinet official (1966–2025)

Minister of Employment, Workforce Development and Labour
- ministre de l’emploi, du développement de la main-d’œuvre et du travail
- Employment and Social Development Canada
- Style: The Honourable
- Member of: House of Commons; Privy Council; Cabinet
- Reports to: Parliament; Prime Minister
- Appointer: Monarch (represented by the governor general); on the advice of the prime minister
- Term length: At His Majesty's pleasure
- Inaugural holder: Jean Marchand
- Formation: October 1, 1966
- Salary: CA$299,900 (2024)
- Website: esdc-edsc.gc.ca

The minister of Employment, Workforce Development and Labour (French: ministre de l’emploi, du développement de la main-d’œuvre et du travail) was the minister of the Crown in the Canadian Cabinet who was responsible for Employment and Social Development Canada, the Government of Canada department that oversees programs such as employment insurance, the Canada pension plan, old age security, and Canada student loans. On March 14, 2025, the position was abolished, its responsibilities being consolidated into the new position of Minister of Jobs and Families.

== History ==
The ministerial responsibility for employment has its origins in the October 1, 1966 cabinet reshuffle, when Jean Marchand's portfolio was renamed from Minister of Immigration and Citizenship to Minister of Manpower and Immigration, Along with this change, minister Marchand was tasked by Prime Minister Lester Pearson to draft a White paper to renew Canada's immigration policy. Pearson wanted to removed all discriminatory clauses remaining in Canada's immigration regulations, and instead facilitate the immigration of qualified workers from Asia.

The following year, Canada introduced its first point system to rank potential immigrants for eligibility. It originally consisted of 9 categories: education, occupation, professional skills, age, arranged employment, knowledge of English and/or French, relatives in Canada and "personal characteristics". To qualify for immigration 50 points out of 100 were necessary in 1967.

In 1977, the portfolio was renamed Minister of Employment and Immigration, a move that reflected the importance of attracting and retaining economic immigrants for Canadian governments in the 1980s and 1990s.

On 12 July 1996, the office of the Minister of Employment and Immigration was abolished and replaced with the office of Minister of Human Resources Development. The portfolio for immigration was transferred to the office of Minister of Citizenship and Immigration following the reorganization of the government and formation of the department for Citizenship and Immigration Canada.

On February 6, 2006, Prime Minister Stephen Harper transferred the responsibilities of the Minister of Social Development into this portfolio. Although the legislated names did not change, in accordance with this amalgamation the Minister was for a while styled the Minister of Human Resources and Social Development and the department operated as Human Resources and Social Development Canada. This ceased on October 30, 2008, and the name returned to the legislated one.

In 2015, the Employment portfolio was merged into the expanded ministry of Employment, Workforce Development and Labour.

In 2019, following the 2019 Canadian federal election, the portfolio was split between the Minister of Labour and Employment, Workforce Development and Disability Inclusion, with Carla Qualtrough being appointed the new minister on November 20.

In 2023, the Official Languages portfolio was merged into the expanded ministry of Employment, Workforce Development and Official Languages, with Randy Boissonnault being appointed the new minister on July 26, 2023.

In 2024, responsibility for labour was folded back into the portfolio while responsibility for official languages was split off; consequently, the position reverted to its former title of Minister of Employment, Workforce Development and Labour, with incumbent Labour minister Steven MacKinnon being appointed to the post. The position was abolished the following year and its responsibilities consolidated into the new position of Minister of Jobs and Families, with MacKinnon becoming its inaugural holder.

== List of ministers ==
Liberal Party of Canada
Progressive Conservative Party of Canada
Conservative Party of Canada

No.	Portrait	Name	Term of office		Political party	Ministry
Minister of Manpower and Immigration
1		Jean Marchand	October 1, 1966	April 20, 1968	Liberal	19 (Pearson)
1		Jean Marchand	April 20, 1968	July 5, 1968	Liberal	20 (P. E. Trudeau)
2		Allan MacEachen	July 5, 1968	September 23, 1970	Liberal	20 (P. E. Trudeau)
3		Otto Lang	September 24, 1970	January 27, 1972	Liberal	20 (P. E. Trudeau)
4		Bryce Mackasey	January 28, 1972	November 26, 1972	Liberal	20 (P. E. Trudeau)
5		Bob Andras	November 27, 1972	September 13, 1976	Liberal	20 (P. E. Trudeau)
6		Bud Cullen	September 14, 1976	August 14, 1977	Liberal	20 (P. E. Trudeau)
Minister of Employment and Immigration
(6)		Bud Cullen	August 15, 1977	June 3, 1979	Liberal	20 (P. E. Trudeau)
7		Ron Atkey	June 4, 1979	March 2, 1980	Progressive Conservative	21 (Clark)
8		Lloyd Axworthy	March 3, 1980	August 11, 1983	Liberal	22 (P. E. Trudeau)
9		John Roberts	August 12, 1983	June 29, 1984	Liberal	22 (P. E. Trudeau)
9		John Roberts	June 30, 1984	September 16, 1984	Liberal	23 (Turner)
10		Flora MacDonald	September 17, 1984	June 29, 1986	Progressive Conservative	24 (Mulroney)
11		Benoît Bouchard	June 30, 1986	March 30, 1988	Progressive Conservative	24 (Mulroney)
12		Barbara McDougall	March 31, 1988	April 20, 1991	Progressive Conservative	24 (Mulroney)
13		Bernard Valcourt	April 21, 1991	June 24, 1993	Progressive Conservative	24 (Mulroney)
13		Bernard Valcourt	June 25, 1993	November 3, 1993	Progressive Conservative	25 (Campbell)
(8)		Lloyd Axworthy (second time)	November 4, 1993	January 24, 1996	Liberal	26 (Chrétien)
14		Doug Young	January 25, 1996	July 11, 1996	Liberal	26 (Chrétien)
Minister of Human Resources Development
(14)		Doug Young	July 12, 1996	October 3, 1996	Liberal	26 (Chrétien)
15		Pierre Pettigrew	October 4, 1996	August 2, 1999	Liberal	26 (Chrétien)
16		Jane Stewart	August 3, 1999	December 11, 2003	Liberal	26 (Chrétien)
Minister of Human Resources and Skills Development
17		Joe Volpe	December 12, 2003	January 14, 2005	Liberal	27 (Martin)
18		Lucienne Robillard	January 14, 2005	May 17, 2005	Liberal	27 (Martin)
19		Belinda Stronach	May 17, 2005	February 5, 2006	Liberal	27 (Martin)
Minister of Human Resources and Social Development
20		Diane Finley	February 6, 2006	January 3, 2007	Conservative	28 (Harper)
21		Monte Solberg	January 4, 2007	October 29, 2008	Conservative	28 (Harper)
Minister of Human Resources and Skills Development
(20)		Diane Finley	October 30, 2008	July 15, 2013	Conservative	28 (Harper)
Minister of Employment and Social Development
22		Jason Kenney	July 15, 2013	February 9, 2015	Conservative	28 (Harper)
23		Pierre Poilievre	February 9, 2015	November 4, 2015	Conservative	28 (Harper)
Minister of Employment, Workforce Development and Labour
24		MaryAnn Mihychuk	November 4, 2015	January 10, 2017	Liberal	29 (J. Trudeau)
25		Patty Hajdu	January 10, 2017	November 20, 2019	Liberal	29 (J. Trudeau)
Minister of Employment, Workforce Development and Disability Inclusion
26		Carla Qualtrough	November 20, 2019	July 26, 2023	Liberal	29 (J. Trudeau)
Minister of Employment, Workforce Development and Official Languages
27		Randy Boissonnault	July 26, 2023	November 20, 2024	Liberal	29 (J. Trudeau)
28		Ginette Petitpas Taylor	November 20, 2024	December 20, 2024	Liberal	29 (J. Trudeau)
Minister of Employment, Workforce Development and Labour
29		Steven MacKinnon	December 20, 2024	Incumbent	Liberal	29 (J. Trudeau)
Position discontinued, replaced by the Minister of Jobs and Families
