= Minister of Seniors =

Canadian federal cabinet portfolio (2011–2025)

- Ministre des Aînés
- Incumbent; Vacant since March 14, 2025
- Style: The Honourable
- Member of: Cabinet; Privy Council
- Appointer: Monarch (represented by the governor general); on the advice of the prime minister
- Term length: At His Majesty's pleasure
- Inaugural holder: Julian Fantino
- Formation: January 4, 2011
- Salary: CA$299,900 (2024)

The Minister of Seniors (French: Ministre des Aînés), previously known as the Minister of State for Seniors (French: Ministre d'État aux Aînés), is a Minister of the Crown in the Canadian Cabinet. The portfolio was initially introduced during the government of Stephen Harper but the position was labeled as a Minister of State. The portfolio was reintroduced during the government of Justin Trudeau, in July 2018. On March 14, 2025 the position was discontinued, its responsibilities being consolidated into the new position of Minister of Jobs and Families.

== List of ministers ==
Key:

Liberal Party of Canada
Conservative Party of Canada

No.	Portrait	Name	Term of office		Political party	Ministry
Minister of State for Seniors
1		Julian Fantino	January 4, 2011	May 18, 2011	Conservative	28 (Harper)
2		Alice Wong	May 18, 2011	November 4, 2015	Conservative	28 (Harper)
Minister of Seniors
For ministers responsible for seniors between 2015 and 2018, see Minister of Families, Children and Social Development.
3		Filomena Tassi	July 18, 2018	November 20, 2019	Liberal	29 (J. Trudeau)
4		Deb Schulte	November 20, 2019	October 26, 2021	Liberal	29 (J. Trudeau)
5		Kamal Khera	October 26, 2021	July 26, 2023	Liberal	29 (J. Trudeau)
6		Seamus O'Regan	July 26, 2023	July 19, 2024	Liberal	29 (J. Trudeau)
7		Steven MacKinnon	July 19, 2024	December 20, 2024	Liberal	29 (J. Trudeau)
8		Joanne Thompson	December 20, 2024	March 14, 2025	Liberal	29 (J. Trudeau)
Position discontinued, replaced by the Minister of Jobs and Families until 2025
Secretary of State (Seniors)
4		Stephanie McLean	May 13, 2025	present	Liberal	30 (Carney)
