= Minister of Labour (Canada) =

Canadian cabinet minister

Secretary of State (Labour)
- Incumbent; John Zerucelli since May 13, 2025
- Employment and Social Development Canada
- Style: The Honourable
- Member of: Cabinet; Privy Council
- Reports to: Parliament; Prime Minister
- Appointer: Monarch (represented by the governor general); on the advice of the prime minister
- Term length: At His Majesty's pleasure
- Inaugural holder: William Lyon Mackenzie King
- Formation: 2 June 1909
- Salary: CA$299,900 (2024)
- Website: www.canada.ca/labour

The minister of Labour (French: Ministre du Travail) was a minister of the Crown in the Canadian Cabinet who was responsible for the labour portfolio of Employment and Social Development Canada. The position has been discontinued since 2024; responsibility for the labour portfolio is currently held by the Minister of Jobs and Families. It was partly re-established into the portfolio titled Secretary of State (Labour) in 2025.

== History ==
The Department of Labour was created in 1900 through the efforts of the then postmaster general, William Mulock, who already held the responsibility for labour affairs, and William Lyon Mackenzie King becoming, respectively, the first minister and deputy minister of the new department. Until June, 1909, the postmaster general acted as minister of labour.

The Ministry of Labour oversaw a variety of issues, including union riots against immigration in 1907, post-war promotion of the federal Labour-Management Cooperation Service, and legislation surrounding the formation of unions.

In 1996, the Department of Labour was abolished, but the ministerial position continued within Human Resources Development Canada from 1996 to 2003 and inside Human Resources and Skills Development Canada in the following years.

From 1993 to 1996, the Department of Labour was amalgamated with the Department of Employment and Immigration to create Human Resources Development Canada. Although the intent was to replace two Cabinet posts with a single minister of human resources development, the desire to appoint "star candidate" Lucienne Robillard's to Cabinet in 1995 gave the position a reprieve from amalgamation—Robillard was given the title and positioned as a second minister inside HRDC, responsible for the Labour Program.

A December, 2003, reorganization had seen HRDC dismantled and labour responsibilities passing to a successor department, Human Resources and Skills Development Canada, again with two ministers: a minister of labour and a minister of human resources and skills development. The name change to Labour and Housing occurred seven months later. The Ministry of HRDC was reconstituted in February, 2006, as Human Resources and Social Development Canada, but still with two ministers.

In 2004, the portfolio was renamed from Labour to Labour and Housing.

From 2004 to 2006, the position was styled the minister of labour and housing (French: ministre du travail et du logement), a name change corresponding with responsibility for the Canada Mortgage and Housing Corporation being transferred to the portfolio at that time. Minister of labour remains the title for legal purposes.

In 2015, the position was discontinued, with responsibility for labour being merged into the expanded role of Minister of Employment, Workforce Development and Labour. The position was revived in 2019, following the 2019 Canadian federal election, with Filomena Tassi being appointed the new minister of Labour on November 20.

The position was discontinued in 2024, its responsibilities once again being combined with employment and workforce development under the Minister of Employment, Workforce Development and Labour; as of 2025, responsibility for labour is currently held by the Minister of Jobs and Families.

== List of ministers ==
Key:

Liberal Party of Canada
Historical conservative parties: Liberal-Conservative, Conservative (historical), Unionist, National Liberal and Conservative, Progressive Conservative
Conservative Party of Canada

No.	Portrait	Name	Term of office		Political party	Ministry
Minister of Labour
For ministers responsible for labour issues before 1909, see Postmaster General of Canada.
1		William Lyon Mackenzie King	June 2, 1909	October 6, 1911	Liberal	8 (Laurier)
2		Thomas Wilson Crothers	October 10, 1911	October 12, 1917	Conservative (historical)	9 (Borden)
2		Thomas Wilson Crothers	October 12, 1917	November 6, 1918	Unionist	10 (Borden)
3		Gideon Robertson; 1st time	November 8, 1918	July 10, 1920	Unionist	10 (Borden)
3		Gideon Robertson; 1st time	July 10, 1920	December 29, 1921	National Liberal and Conservative	11 (Meighen)
4		James Murdock	December 29, 1921	November 13, 1925	Liberal	12 (King)
*		James Horace King; Acting	November 13, 1925	March 8, 1926	Liberal	12 (King)
5		John Campbell Elliott	March 8, 1926	June 29, 1926	Liberal	12 (King)
*		Robert James Manion; Acting	June 29, 1926	July 13, 1926	Conservative (historical)	13 (Meighen)
6		George Burpee Jones	July 13, 1926	September 25, 1926	Conservative (historical)	13 (Meighen)
7		Peter Heenan	September 25, 1926	August 7, 1930	Liberal	14 (King)
(3)		Gideon Robertson; 2nd time	August 7, 1930	February 3, 1932	Conservative (historical)	15 (Bennett)
8		Wesley Ashton Gordon	February 3, 1932	October 23, 1935	Conservative (historical)	15 (Bennett)
9		Norman McLeod Rogers	October 23, 1935	September 18, 1939	Liberal	16 (King)
10		Norman Alexander McLarty	September 18, 1939	December 14, 1941	Liberal	16 (King)
11		Humphrey Mitchell	December 14, 1941	November 15, 1948	Liberal	16 (King)
11		Humphrey Mitchell	November 15, 1948	August 2, 1950	Liberal	17 (St. Laurent)
*		Paul Martin Sr. Acting	August 2, 1950	August 6, 1950	Liberal	17 (St. Laurent)
12		Milton Fowler Gregg	August 6, 1950	June 21, 1957	Liberal	17 (St. Laurent)
13		Michael Starr	June 21, 1957	April 22, 1963	Progressive Conservative	18 (Diefenbaker)
14		Allan MacEachen	April 22, 1963	December 18, 1965	Liberal	19 (Pearson)
15		John Robert Nicholson	December 18, 1965	April 20, 1968	Liberal	19 (Pearson)
16		Jean-Luc Pépin	April 20, 1968	July 6, 1968	Liberal	20 (P. E. Trudeau)
17		Bryce Mackasey	July 6, 1968	January 28, 1972	Liberal	20 (P. E. Trudeau)
18		Martin O'Connell	January 28, 1972	November 27, 1972	Liberal	20 (P. E. Trudeau)
19		John Munro	November 27, 1972	September 8, 1978	Liberal	20 (P. E. Trudeau)
*		André Ouellet; Acting	September 8, 1978	November 24, 1978	Liberal	20 (P. E. Trudeau)
(18)		Martin O'Connell; 2nd time	November 24, 1978	June 4, 1979	Liberal	20 (P. E. Trudeau)
20		Lincoln Alexander	June 4, 1979	March 3, 1980	Progressive Conservative	21 (Clark)
21		Gerald Regan	March 3, 1980	September 22, 1981	Liberal	22 (P. E. Trudeau)
22		Charles Caccia	September 22, 1981	August 12, 1983	Liberal	22 (P. E. Trudeau)
23		André Ouellet	August 12, 1983	June 30, 1984	Liberal	22 (P. E. Trudeau)
23		André Ouellet	June 30, 1984	September 17, 1984	Liberal	23 (Turner)
24		Bill McKnight	September 17, 1984	June 30, 1986	Progressive Conservative	24 (Mulroney)
25		Pierre Cadieux	June 30, 1986	January 30, 1989	Progressive Conservative	24 (Mulroney)
26		Jean Corbeil	January 30, 1989	April 21, 1991	Progressive Conservative	24 (Mulroney)
27		Marcel Danis	April 21, 1991	June 25, 1993	Progressive Conservative	24 (Mulroney)
28		Bernard Valcourt	June 25, 1993	November 4, 1993	Progressive Conservative	25 (Campbell)
29		Lloyd Axworthy	November 4, 1993	February 22, 1995	Liberal	26 (Chrétien)
30		Lucienne Robillard	February 22, 1995	January 25, 1996	Liberal	26 (Chrétien)
31		Alfonso Gagliano	January 25, 1996	June 11, 1997	Liberal	26 (Chrétien)
32		Lawrence MacAulay	June 11, 1997	November 23, 1998	Liberal	26 (Chrétien)
33		Claudette Bradshaw	November 23, 1998	December 12, 2003	Liberal	26 (Chrétien)
33		Claudette Bradshaw	December 12, 2003	July 20, 2004	Liberal	27 (Martin)
Minister of Labour and Housing
34		Joe Fontana	July 20, 2004	February 6, 2006	Liberal	
Minister of Labour
35		Jean-Pierre Blackburn	February 6, 2006	October 30, 2008	Conservative	28 (Harper)
36		Rona Ambrose	October 30, 2008	January 19, 2010	Conservative	28 (Harper)
37		Lisa Raitt	January 19, 2010	July 15, 2013	Conservative	28 (Harper)
38		Kellie Leitch	July 15, 2013	November 4, 2015	Conservative	28 (Harper)
Minister of Employment, Workforce Development and Labour
39		MaryAnn Mihychuk	November 4, 2015	January 10, 2017	Liberal	29 (J. Trudeau)
40		Patty Hajdu	January 10, 2017	November 20, 2019	Liberal	29 (J. Trudeau)
Minister of Labour						29 (J. Trudeau)
41		Filomena Tassi	November 20, 2019	October 26, 2021	Liberal	29 (J. Trudeau)
42		Seamus O'Regan	October 26, 2021	July 19, 2024	Liberal	29 (J. Trudeau)
43		Steven MacKinnon	July 19, 2024	December 20, 2024	Liberal	29 (J. Trudeau)
Position discontinued, replaced by the Minister of Employment, Workforce Development and Labour until 2025
Secretary of State (Labour)
44		John Zerucelli	May 13, 2025	present	Liberal	30 (Carney)
