= Seamus O'Regan =

Canadian politician (born 1971)

The Honourable Seamus O'Regan PC
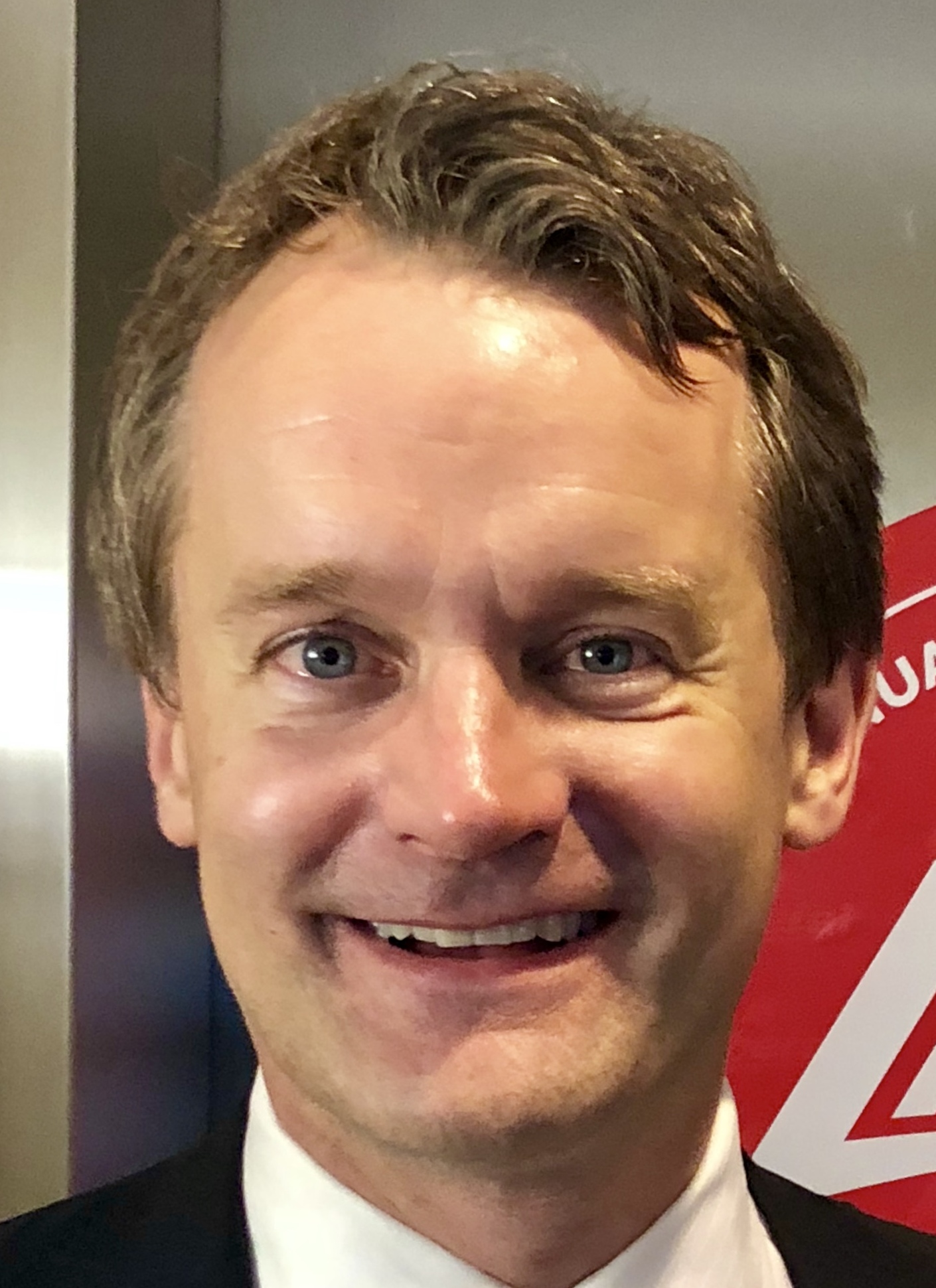
- O'Regan in June 2018

Minister of Seniors
- In office July 26, 2023 – July 19, 2024
- Prime Minister: Justin Trudeau
- Preceded by: Kamal Khera
- Succeeded by: Steven MacKinnon

Minister of Labour
- In office October 26, 2021 – July 19, 2024
- Prime Minister: Justin Trudeau
- Preceded by: Filomena Tassi
- Succeeded by: Steven MacKinnon

Minister of Natural Resources
- In office November 20, 2019 – October 26, 2021
- Preceded by: Amarjeet Sohi
- Succeeded by: Jonathan Wilkinson

Minister of Indigenous Services
- In office January 14, 2019 – November 20, 2019
- Preceded by: Jane Philpott
- Succeeded by: Marc Miller

Minister of Veterans Affairs Associate Minister of National Defence
- In office August 28, 2017 – January 14, 2019
- Preceded by: Kent Hehr
- Succeeded by: Jody Wilson-Raybould

Member of Parliament for St. John's South—Mount Pearl
- In office October 19, 2015 – March 23, 2025
- Preceded by: Ryan Cleary
- Succeeded by: Tom Osborne

Personal details
- Born: Seamus Thomas Harris O'Regan; January 18, 1971 (age 55) St. John's, Newfoundland and Labrador, Canada
- Party: Liberal
- Spouse: Steve Doussis (m. 2010)
- Education: St. Francis Xavier University (BA); University College Dublin (Dipl.); Darwin College, Cambridge (MPhil)
- Occupation: Politician; news reporter; broadcaster

Seamus Thomas Harris O'Regan PC (born January 18, 1971), also known as Seamus O'Regan Jr., is a Canadian politician and a former cabinet minister in the government of Justin Trudeau. He resigned from cabinet effective July 19, 2024. A member of the Liberal Party, O'Regan was first elected to the House of Commons in 2015, representing St. John's South—Mount Pearl. He was appointed to Cabinet in 2017, and served as minister of natural resources from 2019 to 2021, minister of Indigenous services in 2019, and minister of veterans affairs and associate minister of national defence from 2017 to 2019 and minister of labour from October 26, 2021 until July 19, 2024 and minister of seniors from July 26, 2023 until July 19, 2024.

Before he entered politics, O'Regan was a correspondent with CTV National News, and a host of Canada AM, which he co-hosted from 2003 to 2011 with Beverly Thomson.

== Early life and education ==
O'Regan was born in St. John's, Newfoundland, and spent 14 years growing up in Goose Bay, graduating from Goose High School. O'Regan is of half Irish descent. His father, also named Seamus O'Regan, was a judge of the Supreme Court of Newfoundland and Labrador. At the age of 10, O'Regan became a regional correspondent for CBC Radio's children's show Anybody Home?, producing stories that celebrated the unusual accomplishments of local residents, ranging from a professor hunting for giant squid to one woman's fight against leukemia.

He studied politics at St. Francis Xavier University in Antigonish, Nova Scotia, and at University College Dublin in Dublin, Ireland. He studied marketing strategies at INSEAD, an international business school near Paris, France. He received his Masters of Philosophy in Politics from the University of Cambridge, studying at Darwin College in Cambridge, England.

== Career ==
He worked as an assistant to Environment Minister Jean Charest in Ottawa and to Justice Minister Edward Roberts in St. John's, and was policy advisor and speechwriter to Premier Brian Tobin of Newfoundland and Labrador. In December 1999, O'Regan was named as one of Maclean's 100 Young Canadians to Watch in the 21st century.

In 2000, O'Regan joined talktv's current affairs program, the chatroom. He began his duties at Canada AM on December 19, 2001. On November 8, 2011, he announced that he would be leaving Canada AM on November 24, 2011, to become a correspondent for CTV National News. O'Regan left CTV in 2012. Since leaving CTV, he was occasionally a fill-in host on radio station CFRB in Toronto, ⁣ and worked on independent television productions and as a media innovator in residence at Ryerson University. O'Regan also served as the executive vice president for communications of the Stronach Group.

== Political career ==
In September 2014, O'Regan was nominated as the Liberal Party candidate in the Newfoundland and Labrador riding of St. John's South—Mount Pearl for the 2015 federal election. On October 19, 2015, O'Regan won the election, defeating New Democrat incumbent Ryan Cleary. He was appointed to the cabinet on August 28, 2017, as the minister of veterans affairs and on January 14, 2019, was made the minister of Indigenous services, vacating his previous post.

He was re-elected in the 2019 federal election. Following the election, he was appointed minister of natural resources. He was re-elected again in the 2021 federal election.

O'Regan served as minister of labour from 2021 and expanded his portfolio to also include minister of seniors during the 2023 cabinet shuffle. As the labour minister, O'Regan was involved in the BC port workers strike between International Longshore and Warehouse Union Canada and the BC Maritime Employers Association, which included a 13 day work stoppage in the summer of 2023, as well as the strike of WestJet's aircraft mechanics in the summer of 2024.

In July 2024, CBC reported that O'Regan would resign from cabinet for family reasons, but would continue to serve as a Member of Parliament until the 2025 federal election.

Since leaving federal politics, O'Regan has joined both Stewart McKelvey as Senior Business Advisor and Global Public Affairs as Strategic Counsel.

== Personal life ==
On July 9, 2010, O'Regan married his longtime partner, Steve Doussis, in Newfoundland.

O'Regan serves on the Boards of Katimavik, Canada's leading youth service-learning program, and The Rooms, which houses the provincial art gallery, museum, and archives of Newfoundland and Labrador. He also sits on the board of directors for fellow Newfoundlander Allan Hawco's theatre company, The Company Theatre, located in Toronto.

In January 2016, O’Regan announced that he entered an alcoholism rehabilitation program.

In November 2017, he was hospitalised in Ottawa for a major gastrointestinal obstruction. Shortly after the November 2020 death of his father Seamus Bernard O'Regan (1942–2020), Natural Resources Canada announcements began to give his name as Seamus O'Regan Jr.; previous announcements did not use the "Jr." suffix.

== Electoral record ==
2021 Canadian federal election: St. John's South—Mount Pearl
Party	Candidate	Votes	%	±%	Expenditures
Liberal	Seamus O'Regan	19,478	56.17	+5.04	$92,438.10
New Democratic	Ray Critch	8,113	23.40	-3.38	$25,603.86
Conservative	Steve Hodder	6,447	18.59	-0.51	$8,313.27
People's	Georgia Faith Stewart	638	1.84	+1.02	$0.00
Total valid votes/expense limit		34,676	98.82		$105,099.33
Total rejected ballots		414	1.18	-0.26	
Turnout		35,090	52.63	-8.37	
Registered voters		66,677			
Liberal hold		Swing		+4.21	
Source: Elections Canada

2019 Canadian federal election: St. John's South—Mount Pearl
Party	Candidate	Votes	%	±%	Expenditures
Liberal	Seamus O'Regan	20,793	51.13	−6.73	$58,125.56
New Democratic	Anne Marie Anonsen	10,890	26.78	−9.98	$25,130.37
Conservative	Terry Martin	7,767	19.10	+14.53	$56,978.54
Green	Alexandra Hayward	740	1.82	+1.01	$0.00
People's	Benjamin Ruckpaul	335	0.82	–	none listed
Christian Heritage	David Jones	141	0.35	–	none listed
Total valid votes/expense limit		40,666	98.57		$100,487.58
Total rejected ballots		592	1.43	+1.13	
Turnout		41,258	61.42	−5.71	
Eligible voters		67,170			
Liberal hold		Swing		+1.62	
Source: Elections Canada

2015 Canadian federal election: St. John's South—Mount Pearl
Party	Candidate	Votes	%	±%	Expenditures
Liberal	Seamus O'Regan	25,992	57.86	+29.16	$124,533.70
New Democratic	Ryan Cleary	16,467	36.76	–9.58	$98,225.69
Conservative	Marek Krol	2,047	4.57	–19.64	$24,331.40
Green	Jackson McLean	365	0.81	+0.09	–
Total valid votes/expense limit		44,801	100.00		$201,093.98
Total rejected ballots		133	0.30		
Turnout		44,934	67.13		
Eligible voters		66,936			
Liberal gain from New Democratic		Swing		+19.37	
Source: Elections Canada

29th Canadian Ministry (2015–2025) – Cabinet of Justin Trudeau
Cabinet posts (4)
Predecessor	Office	Successor
Kent Hehr	Minister of Veterans Affairs; August 28, 2017 – January 14, 2019	Jody Wilson-Raybould
Jane Philpott	Minister of Indigenous Services; January 14, 2019 – November 20, 2019	Marc Miller
Amarjeet Sohi	Minister of Natural Resources; November 20, 2019 – October 26, 2021	Jonathan Wilkinson
Filomena Tassi	Minister of Labour; October 26, 2021 – July 19, 2024	Steven MacKinnon
