= Minister of Jobs and Families =

Minister in the Cabinet of Canada

- Ministre de l’Emploi et des Familles
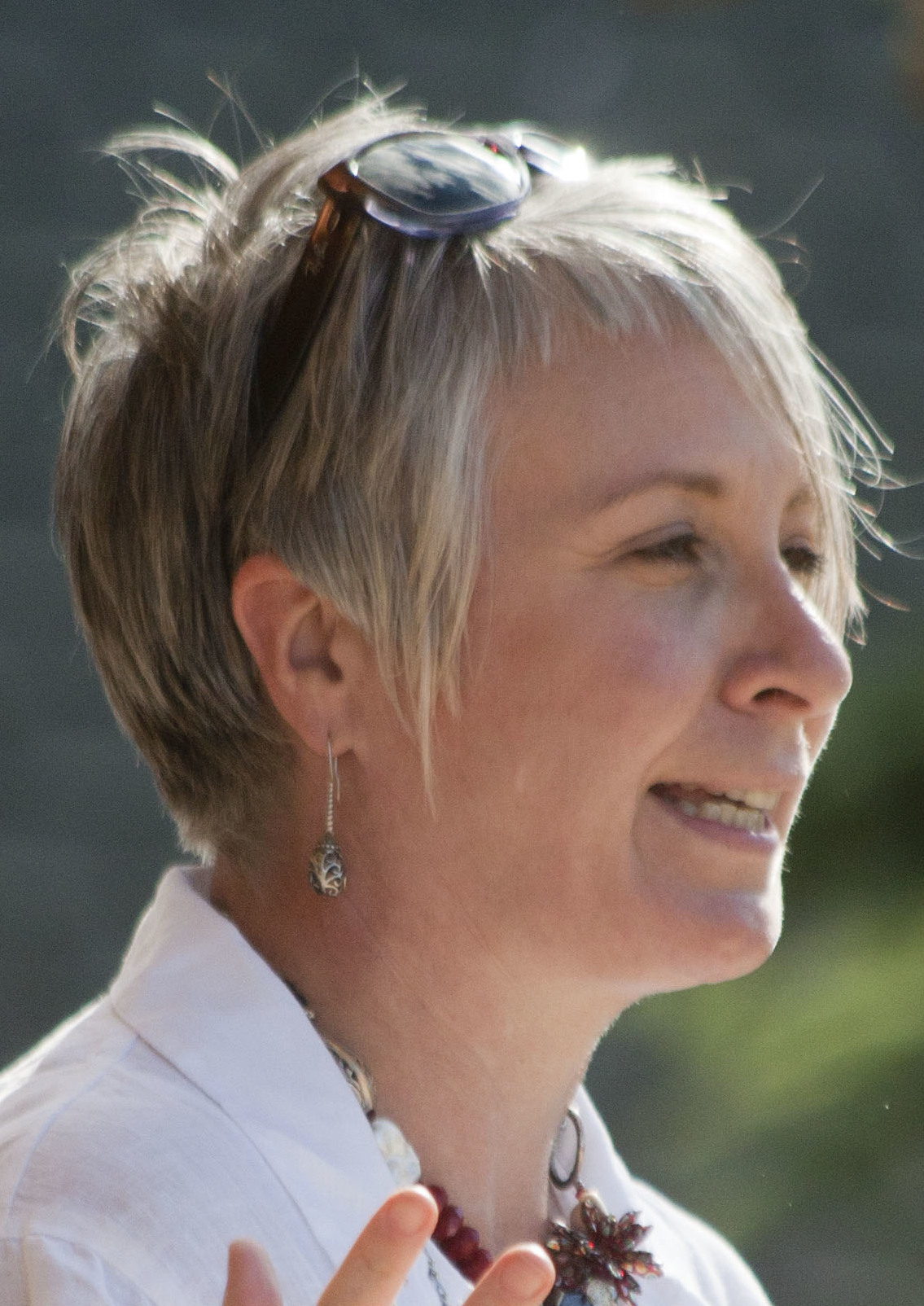
- Incumbent; Patty Hajdu since May 13, 2025
- Employment and Social Development Canada
- Style: The Honourable
- Member of: House of Commons; Privy Council; Cabinet
- Reports to: Parliament; Prime Minister
- Appointer: Monarch (represented by the governor general); on the advice of the prime minister
- Term length: At His Majesty's pleasure
- Inaugural holder: Steven MacKinnon
- Formation: 14 March 2025

The minister of jobs and families (French: ministre de l'emploi et des familles) is a minister of the Crown in the Cabinet of Canada, who is responsible for overseeing Employment and Social Development Canada. The post was established at the start of the 30th Canadian Ministry on March 14, 2025, consolidating all positions associated with Employment and Social Development Canada (Minister of Employment, Workforce Development and Labour, Minister of Families, Children and Social Development, Minister of Seniors, Minister of Citizens' Services, and Minister of Diversity, Inclusion and Persons with Disabilities) into a single post.

The current minister of jobs and families is Patty Hajdu.

== List of ministers ==
Key:

Liberal Party of Canada

No.	Portrait	Name	Term of office		Political party	Ministry
1		Steven MacKinnon	March 14, 2025	May 13, 2025	Liberal	30 (M. Carney)
2		Patty Hajdu	May 13, 2025	Incumbent	Liberal	30 (M. Carney)

== See also ==
- Employment and Social Development Canada
