= 2025 Liberal Party of Canada leadership election =

- March 9, 2025

34,300 points available 17,151 points needed to win
- Opinion polls
- Turnout: 151,899 (92.7% ▲10.54pp)
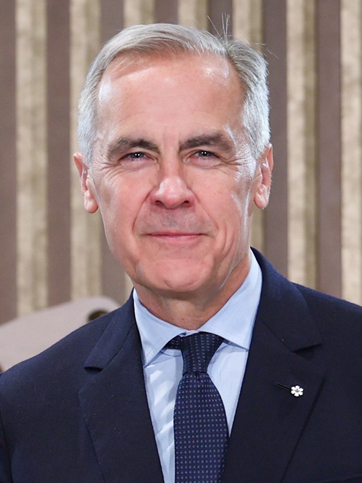

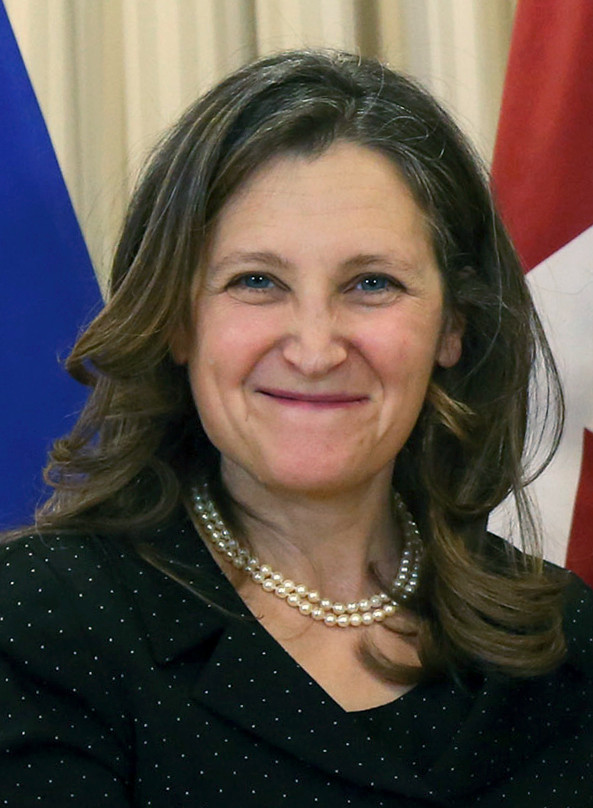
Candidate	Mark Carney	Chrystia Freeland
Points	29,456.91 (85.88%)	2,728.57 (7.96%)
Popular vote	131,674 (86.84%)	11,134 (7.34%)
Leader before election
Justin Trudeau
Elected Leader
Mark Carney

2025 Liberal leadership election
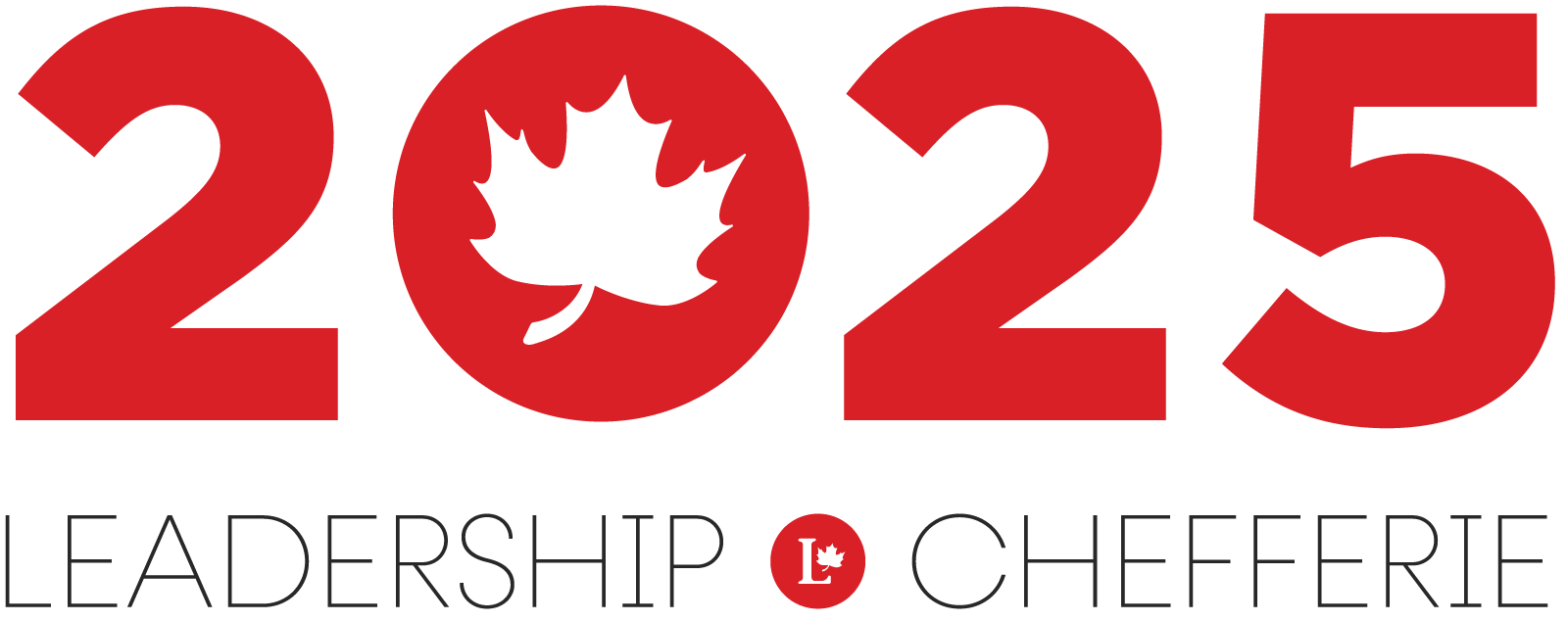
- Date: March 9, 2025
- Convention: Rogers Centre, Ottawa
- Resigning leader: Justin Trudeau
- Won by: Mark Carney
- Candidates: 4
- Entrance fee: $350,000
- Spending limit: $5,000,000

From February 26 to March 9, 2025, members of the Liberal Party of Canada voted on a successor for Justin Trudeau after he announced his intent to resign as the party leader and prime minister of Canada.

Mark Carney, the former governor of the Bank of Canada, won the ranked-choice voting (RCV) election with over 85% of the first-preference vote and points, as well as a majority in all 343 ridings. This margin of victory surpassed Justin Trudeau's 2013 leadership victory margin in vote share, points, and ridings.

Carney was sworn in as prime minister on March 14, the first prime minister in Canadian history to not have previously held elected office. Carney subsequently called and won a snap federal election, with Carney winning the Ottawa riding of Nepean.

== Background ==
In 2013, Justin Trudeau was elected as the leader of the Liberal Party. He led the party to victory in the 2015 federal election, with a majority government, and was re-elected in 2019 and 2021 with minority governments. On March 22, 2022, the Liberals reached a confidence and supply agreement with the New Democratic Party (NDP), who agreed to support the Liberal government until June 2025 in exchange for specific policy commitments.

Throughout 2024, public support for the Liberal Party declined. The party defended three seats in by-elections that year, losing all three. The first came on June 24, with the Toronto—St. Paul's by-election. The seat was vacated by former minister Carolyn Bennett and was considered a safe seat for the Liberals, having been represented by the Liberals since 1993. The by-election was treated by some voters as a "referendum" on Trudeau's premiership. In the aftermath of the loss, Wayne Long publicly called on Trudeau to resign, the first Liberal MP to do so. The Liberals lost a second by-election on September 16, the LaSalle—Émard—Verdun by-election. The seat had been vacated by former minister David Lametti and was also considered a safe seat; senior Liberal figures had considered the by-election a "must-win". On December 16, the Liberals lost a third by-election, the Cloverdale—Langley City by-election, a seat vacated by former Liberal MP John Aldag.

On September 4, the NDP withdrew from their confidence-and-supply agreement with the Liberals, though they did not commit to a motion of non-confidence.

In October, Trudeau faced a caucus revolt when 24 Liberal MPs signed a letter demanding his resignation. However, Trudeau was defiant and unequivocal in his plans to lead the party in the next election. The dissident MPs continued to push for a caucus vote on Trudeau's leadership, though there is no formal mechanism in the party to force one.

=== Resignation of Chrystia Freeland ===
On December 16, hours before the government's fall economic statement, Chrystia Freeland, the minister of finance and deputy prime minister, resigned due to her opposition to Trudeau's fiscal policy. The move was unexpected, particularly since Freeland was seen as a Trudeau loyalist, and led to further calls for Trudeau to step down.

Four days later, on December 20, Trudeau conducted a major cabinet reshuffle. Nevertheless, pressure on Trudeau continued to build. By December 22, 21 MPs publicly called for Trudeau to step down, and 50 had expressed so within caucus. The NDP publicly committed to introducing a non-confidence motion against the government. The Ontario, Atlantic and Quebec regional caucuses called on Trudeau to resign on December 21, 23 and 31, respectively. On January 3, 2025, the Liberal caucus regional chairs met and called an emergency national Liberal caucus meeting, set for January 8, 2025.

On January 6, 2025, Trudeau announced his intention to resign as party leader and prime minister shortly after his successor is chosen.

== Electoral system ==
Under the procedure outlined by the party's constitution, all registered Liberals were eligible to vote directly for leader by preferential ballot if they were registered at least 41 days before the day of the leadership vote. The three criteria for registration as a Liberal were: (1) the registrant must either be a Canadian citizen or permanent resident of Canada or have status under the Indian Act; (2) the registrant must not be a member of another political party; and (3) the registrant must be a minimum of 14 years old. As of the January 27, 2025, registration deadline, there were approximately 400,000 registered voters eligible to cast ballots.

To be nominated, a candidate was required to collect 300 signatures from registered Liberals, including at least 100 from three different provinces or territories.

Candidates were required to pay a $350,000 entrance fee to run. The fee was to be paid in four instalments between January 23 and February 17, 2025, with only the initial $50,000 instalment being refundable.

The voting system used was instant-runoff voting, weighted so that each electoral district was equal. For each of the 343 electoral districts, (Note: The set of 343 federal electoral districts determined by the 2022 Canadian federal electoral redistribution was used, not the set of 338 electoral districts that was represented in the House of Commons at the time of the vote.) 100 "points" were allocated to the candidates in proportion to the number of first-preference votes received from voters resident in that electoral district. To win, 17,151 points were required. If no candidate had received a majority of points on the first count, the candidate with the fewest points would have been eliminated and a second count conducted, with the 100 points for each electoral district allocated to the remaining candidates according to the voters' first preference among remaining candidates. This process would then have continued until one candidate received a majority of points.

== Campaign ==
Following Trudeau's announcement, political commentators suggested that several figures were likely candidates: Anita Anand, Mark Carney, François-Philippe Champagne, Christy Clark, Chrystia Freeland, Mélanie Joly and Dominic LeBlanc. Other possible candidates named were Sean Fraser, Karina Gould and Jonathan Wilkinson. Freeland, a leading member of Trudeau's government, had been seen as a "possible heir apparent" as far back as 2021. After her resignation from cabinet, some MPs voiced their support for her to replace Trudeau. LeBlanc, another key member of Trudeau's cabinet and a leadership candidate in 2009, had reportedly been organizing a leadership campaign in April 2024, in the event Trudeau stepped down. Carney, the former governor of the Bank of Canada, had been courted by the party for the leadership in 2012, and had been rumoured as a star candidate in the 2021 election. In November 2024, Carney did not rule out a future leadership bid. Clark, the premier of British Columbia from 2011 to 2017, had called on Trudeau to step down on multiple occasions since 2022, and in October 2024, publicly expressed interest in leading the party. Anand, Champagne and Joly were also widely believed to harbour leadership ambitions.

The same day as Trudeau's announcement, Frank Baylis announced his intention to run for leader. Baylis, the MP for Pierrefonds—Dollard from 2015 to 2019, had publicly mulled a leadership run since June 26, 2024, after the party lost the Toronto—St. Paul's by-election. On January 9, Chandra Arya, MP for Nepean, announced his leadership bid.

In an interview on January 10 with CBC Radio's The House, Clark confirmed she was seriously considering running for the leadership. Addressing her endorsement of Jean Charest in the 2022 Conservative leadership election, Clark claimed to have only done so to oppose Pierre Poilievre, and insisted she had never actually been a member of the Conservative Party. Following the interview, a spokesman from the Conservative Party provided a screenshot of their records showing that Clark had been a member; Clark responded, saying she had "misspoke". Four days later, on January 14, Clark announced she would not run for leader, citing the short length of the race and insufficient French.

On January 13, Jaime Battiste, MP for Sydney—Victoria, announced his campaign. If elected, Battiste, who is Mi'kmaw, would have become the first Indigenous prime minister. Though he acknowledged his bid was a longshot, he hoped it would inspire other Indigenous people and pave the way for future candidates. Battiste was also motivated by Fraser declining to run, and hoped to be a voice for the Atlantic provinces in the contest. On January 14, it was reported that Gould was preparing a leadership bid. Gould was the incumbent government house leader and had previously headed several ministries.

Carney announced his candidacy on January 16. Freeland announced her candidacy on January 17. Gould announced her candidacy on January 18. Former MP Ruby Dhalla announced her campaign on January 24.

On January 25, Arya was disqualified by the party. Arya did not elaborate on why the party had disqualified him. In a response to media inquiries, a Liberal Party spokesman cited a section of the party rules that state a candidate can be barred if a vetting committee finds a candidate "manifestly unfit for the office of Leader of the Party", but did not elaborate on what specifically were the disqualifying factors.

By January 27, the remaining six prospective candidates — Battiste, Baylis, Carney, Dhalla, Freeland and Gould — were approved by the party.

Three days later, on January 30, Jaime Battiste withdrew his candidacy after failing to raise the second instalment of $50,000. He endorsed Mark Carney. The following month, on February 21, Dhalla was disqualified by the party due to multiple allegations of irregularities in her campaign. Dhalla denied the allegations and appealed the verdict. Her appeal was rejected by the party on February 24.

The French and English debates took place on February 24 and 25 respectively. Both debates covered four themes but primarily focused on US–Canada relations. During the French debate, while talking about the Gaza–Israel conflict, Mark Carney misspoke by saying "We agree with Hamas" instead of "We agree about Hamas". Conservatives were quickly critical, but he was largely defended by Liberals.

The day after the debates were over, the party allowed members to start voting. There were complaints about some of the party membership having issues with the online voting system.

The results were announced on March 9 at the Rogers Centre in Ottawa. At the leadership convention, Trudeau, former prime minister Jean Chrétien, and every candidate delivered speeches.

== Timeline ==
- January 6, 2025 – Governor General Mary Simon grants Trudeau's request to prorogue Parliament until March 24, 2025. Trudeau holds a press conference that morning and announces his intention to resign as party leader and prime minister as soon as his successor is chosen. Former Liberal MP Frank Baylis announces his candidacy for the Liberal leadership.
- January 8, 2025 – The National Liberal Caucus holds its first meeting since Trudeau's resignation. MPs reportedly express a preference for an expedited process and state concerns about the party's voter eligibility rules and request that voting be restricted to citizens and permanent residents in order to prevent foreign interference.
- January 9, 2025 – Liberal Party president Sachit Mehra announces details for the leadership vote, including the voting date, entrance fee and membership rules. Liberal MP Chandra Arya announces his candidacy for the Liberal leadership.
- January 13, 2025 – Liberal MP Jaime Battiste announces his candidacy for the Liberal leadership.
- January 16, 2025 – Former governor of the Bank of Canada Mark Carney announces his candidacy for the Liberal leadership.
- January 17, 2025 – Former finance minister Chrystia Freeland confirms her candidacy for the Liberal leadership in a social media post, with a formal campaign launch scheduled for January 19.
- January 18, 2025 – Government house leader Karina Gould confirms her candidacy for the Liberal leadership with a formal launch being held the next day.
- January 23, 2025, 5 p.m. (EST) – Deadline to announce leadership candidacy and pay a refundable $50,000 installment towards the entrance fee. The party has an additional ten days to approve candidates after they have submitted their registration documents.
- January 24, 2025 – Former Liberal MP Ruby Dhalla confirms her candidacy for the Liberal leadership.
- January 26, 2025 – Liberal MP Chandra Arya is disqualified.
- January 27, 2025 – Deadline to register to vote.
- January 30, 2025 – Jaime Battiste withdraws his candidacy for the Liberal leadership. Due date for non-refundable payment of $50,000 (second installment towards entrance fee).
- February 7, 2025 – Deadline for non-refundable payment of $125,000 (third installment towards entrance fee).
- February 17, 2025, 5 p.m. (EST) – Due date for non-refundable payment of $125,000 (fourth and final installment towards $350,000 entrance fee).
- February 21, 2025 – Former Liberal MP Ruby Dhalla is disqualified.
- February 24, 2025 – The French debate is held in Montreal.
- February 25, 2025 – The English debate is held in Montreal.
- February 26, 2025, 8 a.m. (EST) – Voting period begins.
- March 9, 2025 – Voting period ends at 3 p.m. (EDT). Voting results announced at an event in Ottawa at 6:30 p.m. (EDT).
- March 9, 2025 – Carney declared winner of the 2025 Liberal leadership election.

== Candidates ==
=== Approved ===
Candidates who have submitted a minimum of 300 signatures of registered Liberals, had their applications approved by the party, and paid the $350,000 entrance fee.

Candidate	Experience	Candidacy	Policies	Campaign	Ref.
Frank Baylis	MP for Pierrefonds—Dollard (2015–2019)	Announced: January 6, 2025 Approved: January 23, 2025 Campaign slogan: Prosperity for all Canadians Campaign slogan (French): La Prospérité pour tous les Canadiens	Limit senators to one 10-year term and MPs to 10-year terms with a "prolonged period" in-between.; Create a second House of Commons chamber for debate.; Redistribute power to MPs instead of party leaders.; Invest in Canadian universities, businesses, and incubators.; Decrease government debt.; Recognize Palestine and invest in rebuilding in Gaza.; Establish two west–east pipelines to transport Albertan natural gas to Europe and Asia.; Invest in Canada's electrical power transmission grid, the Small Modular Reactor Action Plan, and research and development for renewable energy.; Work with provinces to modernize healthcare using artificial intelligence.; Spend 2% of GDP on defence (the NATO target), by investing in research, growing military through increasing troop wages and benefits, and increasing number of peacekeepers.; Supports a CANZUK economic bloc.; Refuse to offer Trump concessions for tariffs.; Invest in large projects like social housing, rail projects, and expanded public transit to create jobs.; Tie number of new immigrants to housing availability.; Incentivize local governments to achieve housing development targets.; Modify National Building Code to streamline approvals of modular homes.; Eliminate the budget deficit by increasing productivity.; Increase amount allowed in First Home Savings Accounts.; Scrap capital gains tax increase.	Endorsements; Website	
Mark Carney	Governor of the Bank of Canada (2008–2013); Governor of the Bank of England (2013–2020)	Announced: January 16, 2025 Approved: January 22, 2025 Campaign slogan: It's Time to Build. Campaign slogan (French): Bâtissons l'avenir.	Replace consumer carbon tax with an incentive program to reward green choices, while keeping tax on large industrial emitters.; Introduce a "carbon border-adjustment" to penalize high-polluting foreign imports.; Spend 2% of GDP on defence (the NATO target) by 2030, by investing in Canadian-made defence equipment and strengthening Canada's Arctic presence through dual-use infrastructure (e.g. deepwater ports, runways).; Scrap capital gains tax increase and cut taxes for middle class.; Cut red tape on building projects and interprovincial trade.; Supports "the concept" of a west–east oil pipeline.; Run a small deficit to invest in Canada's economy, while balancing operational spending (e.g. government programs, federal transfers, debt service charges) over three years.; Impose dollar-for-dollar retaliatory tariffs on the U.S.; Expand Canada's energy infrastructure to be less dependent on foreign suppliers.; Double the pace of new housing construction over a decade.; Scrap GST on new homes worth up to $1 million for first-time buyers.; Cap immigration until it returns to pre-pandemic trends.; Create two new Arctic military bases.	Endorsements; Website	
Chrystia Freeland	Deputy Prime Minister of Canada (2019–2024); Minister of Finance (2020–2024); Minister of Intergovernmental Affairs (2017–2020); Minister of Foreign Affairs (2017–2019); Minister of International Trade (2015–2017); MP for University—Rosedale (2015–2026); MP for Toronto Centre (2013–2015)	Announced: January 17, 2025 Approved: January 22, 2025 Campaign slogan: Fight for Canada Campaign slogan (French): Défendre le Canada	Replace carbon tax with a system collaboratively developed with the provinces and territories.; Scrap capital gains tax increase.; Implement automatic leadership reviews at permanent biennial conventions.; Spend 2% of GDP on defence (the NATO target) by 2027, in part by enlarging military and increasing troop wages by 50%.; Cut second income tax bracket rate from 20.5% to 19%.; Cap profit margins on essential goods and make shrinkflation illegal.; Scrap GST on new homes worth up to $1.5 million for first-time buyers.; Cap credit card interest rates at 15%, working toward 10%.; Build 100,000 more $10-a-day childcare spots by requiring new or renovated federal offices to include daycare.; Cap Cabinet at 20 ministers.; If Trump tariffs happen, offer Canadian doctors in the U.S. $200,000 and nurses $100,000 to return to Canada.; Scrap trade barriers on agriculture, transportation and alcohol.; Enhance tax incentives for critical minerals workers.; Tie number of new immigrants to housing availability.; Bring back rent-to-own programs.; Give renters credit for on-time rent payments.; Build more modular housing factories and affordable housing.; Eliminate the Research and Analysis Division of the Canada Revenue Agency.; Impose dollar-for-dollar retaliatory tariffs on the U.S., and 100% tariffs on Teslas.; Export liquefied natural gas to Canada's allies.; Ask Mark Carney to serve as finance minister.	Endorsements; Website	
Karina Gould	Leader of the Government in the House of Commons (2023–2025); Minister of Families, Children and Social Development (2021–2023); Minister of International Development (2019–2021); Minister of Democratic Institutions (2017–2019); MP for Burlington (2015–present)	Announced: January 18, 2025 Approved: January 23, 2025 Campaign slogan: Meet the Moment Campaign slogan (French): Rencontrez le moment	Cancel April carbon tax increase and create a viable alternative.; Scrap capital gains tax increase.; Permanently remove GST for children's clothing, diapers, strollers, and car seats.; Reduce GST to 4% for one year.; Increase corporate tax rate from 15% to 17% on companies that make over $500 million profits per year.; Offer a $2,000 tax credit on the provincial land transfer tax and interest-free loans worth up to 50% of the home's purchase price to first-time homebuyers.; Spend 2% of GDP on defence (the NATO target) by 2027, by increasing troop wages and improving procurement.; Widen eligibility for employment insurance, "modernize" EI, and bolster supports for seniors and disabled people.; Introduce a universal basic income program.; Exempt supply management from future trade negotiations.; Bolster Competition Bureau's powers to better investigate price gouging and overpricing.; Expand cooperative housing and accelerate modular housing construction.; Supports a citizens' assembly on electoral reform, but wants a referendum on any plan.	Endorsements; Website	

=== Disqualified ===
Candidates who were registered and approved but subsequently disqualified by the party.

Candidate	Experience	Candidacy	Policies	Reasons for disqualification	Ref.
Ruby Dhalla	MP for Brampton—Springdale (2004–2011)	Announced: January 24, 2025 Approved: January 23, 2025 Disqualified: February 21, 2025 Campaign slogan: Canada's Comeback Starts Now Campaign slogan (French): Le retour du Canada commence maintenant	Negotiate with Trump instead of imposing retaliatory tariffs.; Deport illegal immigrants.; Impose life sentences for possession of hard drugs.; Establish an "economic czar" to identify waste and overspending and "health czar" to review healthcare.; Have a deputy prime minister from Quebec, due to lack of fluency in French.	10 violations of campaign and finance rules.; Possible violations of the Canada Elections Act.; "Certain other election finance matters, non-disclosure of material facts and inaccurate financial reporting."	

=== Withdrawn ===
Candidates who registered and were approved but subsequently withdrew.

Candidate	Experience	Candidacy	Policies	Ref.
Jaime Battiste	Parliamentary Secretary to the Minister of Crown-Indigenous Relations (2021–2025); MP for Sydney—Victoria (2019–2025)	Announced: January 13, 2025 Approved: January 23, 2025 Withdrew: January 30, 2025 Endorsed: Mark Carney Campaign slogan: A Balanced Vision for Canada. Campaign slogan (French): Une vision équilibrée pour le Canada.	Continue policies such as the National School Food Program, Canadian Dental Care Plan, Pharmacare, and $10-a-day childcare.; Advocate for further reconciliation with Indigenous people.	

=== Failed to qualify ===
- Chandra Arya, MP for Nepean (2015–2025). Campaign announced on January 9, 2025, disqualified on January 25, 2025. Deemed "manifestly unfit" to be leader by the Liberals' leadership vote committee. Had his Liberal nomination revoked prior to the 2025 Canadian election, with Mark Carney becoming the Liberal candidate for Nepean.
- Michael Clark, businessman and anti-abortion activist. Failed to obtain the required number of signatures.

=== Declined ===
- Anita Anand, Minister of Transport and Internal Trade (2024–2025), MP for Oakville (2019–present). (Endorsed Carney)
- François-Philippe Champagne, Minister of Innovation, Science and Industry (2021–2025), MP for Saint-Maurice—Champlain (2015–present). (Endorsed Carney)
- Christy Clark, Premier of British Columbia (2011–2017), Deputy Premier of British Columbia (2001–2004).
- Sean Fraser, Minister of Housing, Infrastructure and Communities (2023–2024), MP for Central Nova (2015–present). (Endorsed Carney)
- Mélanie Joly, Minister of Foreign Affairs (2021–2025), MP for Ahuntsic-Cartierville (2015–present). (Endorsed Carney)
- Dominic LeBlanc, Minister of Finance (2024–2025), Minister of Intergovernmental Affairs (2020–present), MP for Beauséjour (2000–present). (Endorsed Carney)
- Steven MacKinnon, Minister of Employment, Workforce Development and Labour (2024–2025), MP for Gatineau (2015–present). (Endorsed Carney)
- Marc Miller, Minister of Immigration, Refugees and Citizenship (2023–2025), MP for Ville-Marie–Le Sud-Ouest–Île-des-Sœurs (2015–present). (Endorsed Carney)
- Jonathan Wilkinson, Minister of Energy and Natural Resources (2021–2025), MP for North Vancouver (2015–present). (Endorsed Carney)

== Debates ==
Debates among candidates for the 2025 Liberal Party of Canada leadership election
No.	Date	Location	Host	Language	Moderator	Participants – P Participant A Absent invitee O Out of race (withdrawn or disqualified)				
No.	Date	Location	Host	Language	Moderator	Baylis	Carney	Dhalla	Freeland	Gould
1	February 19, 2025	Virtual	National Women's Liberal Commission	English	N/A	P	A	P	P	P
2	February 24, 2025	Montreal, Quebec	Liberal Party of Canada	French	Pierre Jobin	P	P	O	P	P
3	February 25, 2025	Montreal, Quebec	Liberal Party of Canada	English	Hannah Thibedeau	P	P	O	P	P

== Opinion polling ==
=== Liberal supporters ===
Polling firm	Last date of polling	Reference	Sample size	Mark Carney	Chrystia Freeland	Karina Gould	Frank Baylis	Ruby Dhalla	Anita Anand	François- Philippe Champagne	Christy Clark	Mélanie Joly	Dominic LeBlanc	Other/ undecided
Mainstreet Research	February 23, 2025		—	43%	31%	16%	3%	—	—	—	—	—	—	Undecided 7%
Léger	February 10, 2025		432	68%	14%	3%	—	—	—	—	—	—	—	Someone else 4% Don't know 11%
Cint Exchange	January 31, 2025		675	54%	27%	7%	4%	4%	—	—	—	—	—	Jaime Battiste 4% Chandra Arya 2%
Léger	January 26, 2025		336	57%	17%	4%	—	—	—	—	—	—	—	Someone else 4% Don't know 17%
Léger	January 13, 2025		280	27%	21%	1%	—	—	2%	4%	6%	—	—	Chandra Arya 3% Steven MacKinnon 0% Someone else 5% Don't know 30%
Abacus Data	January 7, 2025		—	20%	26%	—	—	—	5%	4%	5%	7%	6%	Steven Guilbeault 2% Don't know 25%
	January 6, 2025	Justin Trudeau announces his resignation as leader of the Liberal Party and Prime Minister, triggering a leadership election.												
Spark Advocacy	Before December 25, 2024		—	18%	26%	—	—	—	8%	9%	8%	11%	10%	Jonathan Wilkinson 8%
Léger	December 22, 2024		245	7%	21%	—	—	—	5%	2%	1%	4%	7%	Someone else 7% Don't know 46%
Léger	September 22, 2024		312	13%	18%	—	—	—	2%	4%	0%	5%	2%	Sean Fraser 4% Someone else 4% Don't know 46%

=== All Canadians ===
Polling firm	Last date of polling	Reference	Sample size	Mark Carney	Chrystia Freeland	Karina Gould	Ruby Dhalla	Frank Baylis	Anita Anand	François- Philippe Champagne	Christy Clark	Sean Fraser	Mélanie Joly	Dominic LeBlanc	Justin Trudeau	Other/ undecided
Mainstreet Research	February 13, 2025		1,128	42%	26%	15%	14%	4%	—	—	—	—	—	—	—	—
Léger	February 10, 2025		1,590	37%	12%	3%	—	—	—	—	—	—	—	—	—	Someone else 17% Don't know 30%
Léger	January 26, 2025		1,527	34%	14%	4%	—	—	—	—	—	—	—	—	—	Someone else 15% Don't know 33%
Léger	January 13, 2025		1,545	13%	14%	1%	—	—	2%	4%	5%	—	—	—	—	Chandra Arya 1% Steven MacKinnon 1% Someone else 14% Don't know 46%
Abacus Data	January 7, 2025		2,500	13%	17%	—	—	—	3%	3%	6%	—	2%	6%	3%	Steven Guilbeault 2% Don't know 47%
	January 6, 2025	Justin Trudeau announces his resignation as leader of the Liberal Party and Prime Minister, triggering a leadership election.														
Nanos Research	January 5, 2025		1,045	13.8%	19.0%	—	—	—	2.4%	3.7%	4.0%	1.6%	4.2%	3.4%	6.4%	NOTA 22.3% Other 5.7% Unsure 13.5%
Spark Advocacy	Before December 25, 2024		2,500	17%	23%	—	—	—	9%	9%	10%	—	13%	10%	—	Jonathan Wilkinson 9%
Léger	December 22, 2024		1,521	7%	15%	—	—	—	2%	3%	3%	—	4%	4%	—	Someone else 15% Don't know 48%
Nanos Research	November 6, 2024		1,010	17.9%	11.1%	—	—	—	3.3%	4.3%	3.6%	2.5%	3.3%	1.7%	11.4%	NOTA 26.2% Other 1.9% Unsure 12.6%
Léger	September 22, 2024		1,556	8%	8%	—	—	—	2%	3%	1%	2%	3%	1%	—	Someone else 16% Don't know 55%
Nanos Research	August 1, 2024		1,035	17.6%	12.3%	—	—	—	3.4%	4.5%	—	1.0%	5.9%	1.9%	9.4%	NOTA 28.8% Unsure 15.3%
Nanos Research	July 3, 2024		1,018	19.5%	9.4%	—	—	—	2.9%	4.2%	—	2.4%	4.9%	2.9%	9.0%	NOTA 25.0% Unsure 19.8%
Nanos Research	December 2, 2023		1,069	15.2%	17.8%	—	—	—	4.9%	2.2%	—	2.0%	3.9%	1.9%	9.3%	NOTA 23.5% Unsure 19.3%

== Results ==
Mark Carney won the election on the first round of counting, obtaining a majority of votes in all 343 ridings. The largest margin, by points, was in Desnethé—Missinippi—Churchill River, where he received all 100 points. The closest margin, by points, was in Pierrefonds—Dollard, where he received 60.24 points to the 31.71 points of Frank Baylis, a former MP of the riding from 2015 to 2019.

2025 Liberal Party of Canada leadership election
Candidate	First ballot			
Candidate	Votes	%	Points	%
Mark Carney	131,674	86.84	29,456.91	85.88
Chrystia Freeland	11,134	7.34	2,728.57	7.96
Karina Gould	4,785	3.16	1,100.34	3.21
Frank Baylis	4,038	2.66	1,014.18	2.96
Total valid votes	151,899	100.00	34,300.00	100.00
Turnout	151,899	92.71		
Eligible voters	163,836			
Source: Liberal Party

== See also ==
- Liberal Party of Canada leadership elections
- 2025 Quebec Liberal Party leadership election
- 2025 Green Party of Canada co-leadership election
