= Ginette Petitpas Taylor =

Canadian politician

The Honourable Ginette Petitpas Taylor PC MP
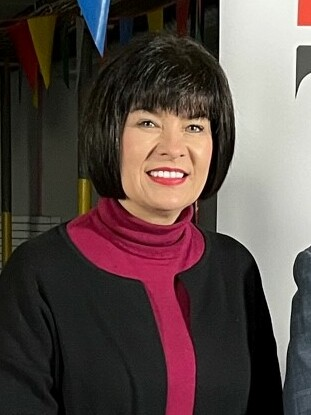
- Petitpas Taylor in 2023

President of the Treasury Board
- In office December 20, 2024 – May 13, 2025
- Prime Minister: Justin Trudeau; Mark Carney
- Preceded by: Anita Anand
- Succeeded by: Shafqat Ali

Minister of Employment, Workforce Development and Official Languages
- In office November 20, 2024 – December 20, 2024
- Prime Minister: Justin Trudeau
- Preceded by: Randy Boissonnault
- Succeeded by: Steven MacKinnon (Employment and Workforce Development); Rachel Bendayan (Official Languages)

Minister of Veterans Affairs Associate Minister of National Defence
- In office July 26, 2023 – December 20, 2024
- Prime Minister: Justin Trudeau
- Preceded by: Lawrence MacAulay
- Succeeded by: Darren Fisher

Minister of Official Languages
- In office October 26, 2021 – July 26, 2023
- Prime Minister: Justin Trudeau
- Preceded by: Mélanie Joly
- Succeeded by: Randy Boissonnault

Minister responsible for the Atlantic Canada Opportunities Agency
- In office October 26, 2021 – July 26, 2023
- Prime Minister: Justin Trudeau
- Preceded by: Mélanie Joly
- Succeeded by: Gudie Hutchings

Deputy Government Whip
- In office November 20, 2019 – October 26, 2021
- Prime Minister: Justin Trudeau
- Preceded by: Linda Lapointe
- Succeeded by: Ruby Sahota
- In office November 20, 2015 – January 29, 2017
- Prime Minister: Justin Trudeau
- Preceded by: Dave MacKenzie
- Succeeded by: Filomena Tassi

Minister of Health
- In office August 28, 2017 – November 20, 2019
- Prime Minister: Justin Trudeau
- Preceded by: Jane Philpott
- Succeeded by: Patty Hajdu

Parliamentary Secretary to the Minister of Finance
- In office January 30, 2017 – August 28, 2017
- Minister: Bill Morneau
- Preceded by: François-Philippe Champagne
- Succeeded by: Joël Lightbound

Member of Parliament for Moncton—Dieppe Moncton—Riverview—Dieppe (2015–2025)
- Incumbent
- Assumed office October 19, 2015
- Preceded by: Robert Goguen

Personal details
- Born: 1968 or 1969 (age 57–58) Dieppe, New Brunswick, Canada
- Party: Liberal
- Spouse: Brock Taylor
- Education: Université de Moncton

Marie Ginette Petitpas Taylor PC MP (born 1968/1969) is a Canadian politician who has been representing the riding of Moncton—Riverview—Dieppe in the House of Commons of Canada since the 2015 federal election. She is a member of the Liberal Party of Canada and a former Minister of Health, and is a member of the Canadian Branch of the Commonwealth Parliamentary Association as well as the Canadian NATO Parliamentary Association.

== Early life and education ==
Petitpas Taylor grew up in Dieppe, New Brunswick and graduated from the Université de Moncton with a bachelor's degree in social work.

== Before politics ==
From 2004 to 2008, she was the chairwoman of the New Brunswick Advisory Council on the Status of Women, and has held a variety of other positions, including the coordinator for the Victim's Services Program of the local detachment of the Royal Canadian Mounted Police (RCMP).

== Political career ==
She won the Liberal Party's nomination for Moncton—Riverview—Dieppe on March 28, 2015, and won the riding in the election held on October 19, 2015.

On December 2, 2015, Prime Minister Justin Trudeau announced the appointment of Petitpas Taylor as deputy government whip. On February 15, 2016, Petitpas Taylor was sworn in as a Member of the Queen's Privy Council for Canada according to her duties as Deputy Government Whip.

She then succeeded Jane Philpott as Minister of Health in a cabinet shuffle on August 28, 2017.

She was re-elected in the 2019 federal election, and appointed Deputy Government Whip (for the second time) as well as a member of the Board of Internal Economy. She was re-elected in the 2021 federal election.

Petitpas Taylor stepped in as Minister of Employment, Workforce Development and Official Languages following the resignation of Randy Boissonnault on November 20, 2024.

On December 16, 2024, strikers from the Canadian Union of Postal Workers (CUPW) protested at Petitpas Taylor's Moncton office in response to the Liberal government's motion to order them back to work. The RCMP was called to the scene but made no comment. Local union head Line Doucet indicated she spoke with and expressed her disappointment to Petitpas Taylor the previous day.

Following the resignation of Chrystia Freeland as deputy prime minister and finance minister, Prime Minister Justin Trudeau shuffled his cabinet on December 20, 2024. Petitpas Taylor was moved out of the three roles she held at the time - Minister of Veterans Affairs (which includes Associate Minister of National Defence); Minister of Official Languages; and Minister of Employment, Workforce Development and Labour - and was appointed President of the Treasury Board.

Petitpas Taylor continued in that role in Mark Carney's 30th Canadian Ministry. After being reelected in the 2025 Canadian federal election in April, she was shuffled out of cabinet on May 13.

== Electoral record ==
2025 Canadian federal election: Moncton—Dieppe
Party	Candidate	Votes	%	±%	Expenditures
Liberal	Ginette Petitpas Taylor	30,215	63.00	+12.97	$60,093.26
Conservative	Jocelyn Dionne	14,974	31.22	+8.63	$87,230.00
New Democratic	Serge Landry	1,775	3.70	−13.10	$7,131.73
Green	Marshall Dunn	994	2.07	−2.19	$1,349.41
Total valid votes		47,958	99.26	–0.01	$122,217.72
Total rejected ballots		356	0.74	+0.01	
Turnout		48,314	71.05	+9.95	
Eligible voters		68,004			
Liberal notional hold		Swing		+2.17	
Source: Elections Canada
Note: number of eligible voters does not include voting day registrations.

2021 Canadian federal election: Moncton—Riverview—Dieppe
Party	Candidate	Votes	%	±%	Expenditures
Liberal	Ginette Petitpas Taylor	22,460	49.08	+6.13	$52,170.34
Conservative	Darlene Smith	10,692	23.36	-0.18	$75,384.79
New Democratic	Serge Landry	7,774	16.99	+5.1	$2,719.74
People's	Lorilee Carrier	2,901	6.34	+3.91	$0.00
Green	Richard Dunn	1,935	4.23	-13.69	$13,859.09
Total valid votes/expense limit		45,762	–	–	$108,536.34
Total rejected ballots					
Turnout			61.40	-8.22	
Registered voters		74,652			
Liberal hold		Swing		+3.16	
Source: Elections Canada

2019 Canadian federal election: Moncton—Riverview—Dieppe
Party	Candidate	Votes	%	±%	Expenditures
Liberal	Ginette Petitpas Taylor	22,261	42.95	-14.80	$57,476.19
Conservative	Sylvie Godin-Charest	12,200	23.54	+2.08	$71,897.56
Green	Claire Kelly	9,287	17.92	+13.31	$19,174.41
New Democratic	Luke MacLaren	6,164	11.89	-4.29	$2,074.25
People's	Stephen Driver	1,258	2.43		none listed
Animal Protection	Brad MacDonald	373	0.72		$2,145.15
Christian Heritage	Rhys Williams	285	0.55		$1,661.07
Total valid votes/expense limit		51,828	99.24		
Total rejected ballots		396	0.76	+0.17	
Turnout		52,224	69.63	-3.74	
Eligible voters		75,006			
Liberal hold		Swing		-8.44	
Source: Elections Canada

2015 Canadian federal election: Moncton—Riverview—Dieppe
Party	Candidate	Votes	%	±%	Expenditures
Liberal	Ginette Petitpas Taylor	30,054	57.75	+27.25	$63,968.39
Conservative	Robert Goguen	11,168	21.46	-15.30	$94,944.45
New Democratic	Luc LeBlanc	8,420	16.18	-12.28	$33,592.43
Green	Luc Melanson	2,399	4.61	+0.33	$9,724.74
Total valid votes/expense limit		52,041	100.00		$204,679.96
Total rejected ballots		311	0.59	-0.13	
Turnout		52,352	73.37	+8.20	
Eligible voters		71,350			
Liberal gain from Conservative		Swing		+21.28	
Source: Elections Canada
