= Rogers Centre Ottawa =

Convention centre in Ottawa, Canada

Rogers Centre Ottawa Centre Rogers Ottawa (French)
- Rogers Centre in 2026
- Former names: Ottawa Congress Centre (1983–2008); Ottawa Convention Centre (2011–14); Shaw Centre (2014–24)
- Address: 55 Colonel By Drive; Ottawa, Ontario; K1N 9J2
- Coordinates: 45.4242°N 75.6916°W
- Owner: Government of Ontario

Construction
- Opened: April 11, 2011; 15 years ago
- Cost: CA$170 million ($245 million in 2025 dollars)

Website
- www.rogers-centre.ca

Rogers Centre Ottawa (formerly the Ottawa Convention Centre and the Shaw Centre) is a convention centre located in the downtown core of Ottawa, Ontario, Canada. It opened in April 2011. The award-winning architecture was designed by Ritchard Brisbin (bbb architects Ottawa). The Centre replaces the Ottawa Congress Centre, which opened in 1983 and is built on the site of the Ottawa Congress Centre building which was demolished in 2008–2009.

In October 2014, the Ottawa Convention Centre and Shaw Communications entered a ten-year naming right agreement that saw the venue renamed to the Shaw Centre. The centre is located on Colonel By Drive, just south of Rideau Street. The facility is owned by the Ontario provincial government. In October 2024, Rogers Communications renamed the venue to Rogers Centre Ottawa to reflect their acquisition of Shaw.

== Facility floor plan ==
Rogers Centre Ottawa has four levels, each with a view of the Rideau Canal and Downtown Ottawa. The first level features a large lobby, as well as the Wall of Three Rivers artwork, which is made of reclaimed logs and acts as a tribute to Ottawa history. This floor consists of eight meeting rooms, an executive boardroom, a coat room, a kitchen studio, administration and direct indoor access to parking lots. The second level consists of 15 meeting rooms, a pre-function area of over 19,806 sq. ft. / 1,840 sq. m., a dedicated show office, a corporate business centre, a coat room, and bridges that link Rogers Centre Ottawa to the Westin Hotel and the Rideau Centre. The third level is a large multipurpose hall and can accommodate up to 6,260 people theatre-style, 4,600 people banquet-style, or up to 400 10'x10' booth displays. The fourth level is a ballroom, reserved for meetings, conferences, or weddings.

== Awards and certifications ==
Rogers Centre Ottawa was built to be as environmentally friendly as possible, and in January 2013, was awarded LEED Gold certification. LEED (Leadership in Energy and Environmental Design) is a green building rating system developed by the U.S. Green Building Council in 1998. It is based on a points system, which then places the building in one of four categories – Certified, Silver, Gold, and Platinum – the latter being the highest achievement of environmental friendliness. There are 70 possible LEED points that can be earned. These points are divided into five different categories: Sustainable Site Development, Water Efficiency, Energy Efficiency, Material Selection and Indoor Environmental Quality. The OCC saves 969,000 gallons of water each year by harvesting rainwater from the roof, which is stored in a cistern below the building. This water is used to flush restroom toilets. 97% of materials from the demolished Congress Centre were diverted from landfill. Rogers Centre Ottawa used recycled steel to build the roof trusses, and logs from the bottom of the Ottawa River to make the Wall of Three Rivers. Because of its panoramic glass design, the OCC saves energy by letting in natural daylight.

== Construction ==
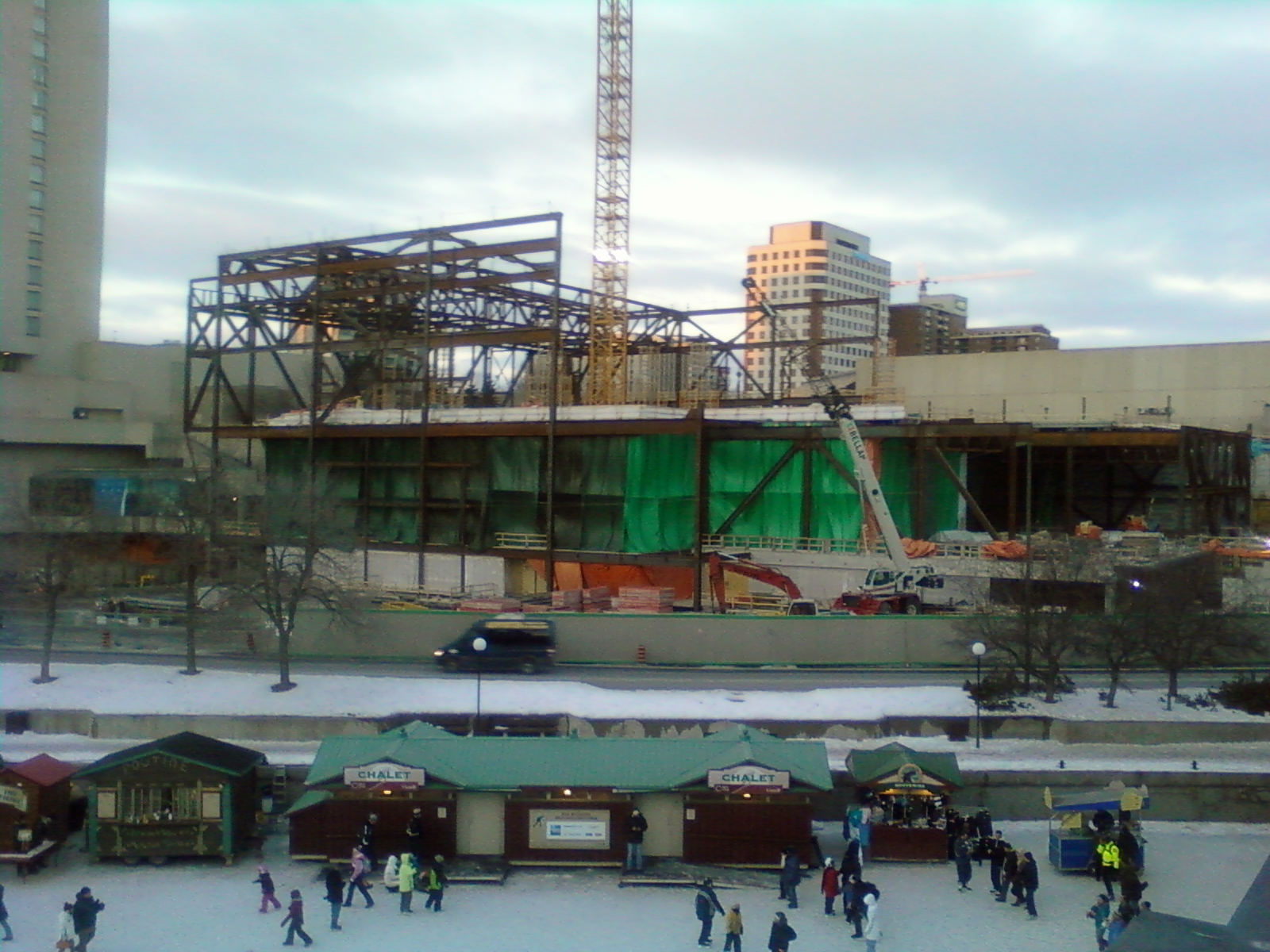
View from Slater Street bridge of Convention Centre under construction. Rideau Canal in front. (February 7, 2010)

The project's cost was CA$170 million, for a four-level 192,000 square feet (17,800 m^{2}) facility. The cost was shared by three levels of government. CA$50 million came from the Canadian government, CA$50 million from the Ontario government, $40 million from the City of Ottawa and the remainder of $30 million was borrowed by the centre itself.

The new building was designed by Ritchard Brisbin (bbb architects Ottawa) and features a curved glass facade on the Colonel By Drive front. From the outside, the entrance from the street is clearly visible and the internal escalators are also visible. While it has four levels of convention space, it is seven storeys in height.

As part of the new project, the name was changed to the Ottawa Convention Centre. According to the centre's chairman, the former title of "congress" was confusing to American convention planners.

== Congress Centre ==
The previous Congress Centre building was designed by Bemi & Associates Architects in 1982. It had 70,000 square feet (6,500 m^{2}) of exhibition space. The building was built on former railways lands, vacated when the main Ottawa train station was moved to Alta Vista Drive outside of downtown. The building was opened by Prime Minister Pierre Trudeau.

The previous Congress Centre was used for conventions, public exhibitions and music concerts. It could support audience sizes of up to a few thousand.

== Events ==
- National Career Development Conference - January 2014
- 2022 Conservative Party of Canada leadership election - September 10, 2022
- 2025 Liberal Party of Canada leadership election - March 9, 2025
