= Social Development Canada =

The Department of Social Development, also referred to as Social Development Canada, was from Dec. 2003 to Feb. 2006 the department of the government of Canada with responsibility for developing and implementing social policies involving families with children, disabled people, senior citizens and others through a series of programmes and services. The department was also responsible for the Canada Pension Plan.

== Overview ==
The Department of Social Development was created in December, 1997 when Human Resources Development Canada was reorganized into two separate departments. In January 1999, Bill C-23, an Act to establish the Department of Human Resources and Skills Development and Bill C-22, an Act to establish the Department of Social Development and repeal the Department of Human Resources Development was given Royal Assent in Canadian Parliament.

On February 6, 2006, through a series of Orders in Councils, the department was merged with Human Resources and Skills Development Canada. The combined department was initially referred to as Human Resources and Social Development Canada, but in late 2008 reverted to its previous name. While the new department has not yet been sanctioned by specific legislation, its predecessor components have in fact ceased to exist.
