= Employment and Social Development Canada =

Government department

- Emploi et Développement social Canada

Department overview
- Formed: 2005
- Type: Department
- Jurisdiction: Canada
- Employees: approx. 45,000
- Minister responsible: Patty Hajdu, Minister of Jobs and Families
- Deputy Minister responsible: Rob Wright
- Parent organization: Government of Canada
- Key document: Department of Employment and Social Development Act S.C. 2005, c. 34
- Website: esdc-edsc.gc.ca

Employment and Social Development Canada (ESDC; French: Emploi et Développement social Canada; EDSC) (Note: Employment and Social Development Canada is the applied title under the Federal Identity Program; the legal title is the Department of Employment and Social Development (French: Ministère de l’Emploi et du Développement social).) is a department of the Government of Canada responsible for social programs and the labour market at the federal level. The department delivers a number of federal government programs and services including Employment Insurance (EI), Service Canada centres, Canada Student Loan Program (CSLP), Canada Pension Plan (CPP), issuing social insurance numbers (SIN) and the federal Labour Program among other things.

Employment and Social Development Canada is part of the membership of the Inter-American Conference on Social Security, a technical and specialized international organization, which has the objective of promoting the development of social protection and security in America.

== History ==
=== Background ===
The Department of Human Resources and Skills Development was created in December 2003, when Human Resources Development Canada (HRDC) was split into two separate departments: Human Resources and Skills Development Canada (HRSDC) and Social Development Canada (SDC). Though they continued to share many common services and operations, Human Resources and Skills Development Canada was to focus on workforce-related aspects of the former HRDC portfolio, while SDC was to focus on social support programs for children, families and seniors. The split was given formal legal effect when the Department of Human Resources and Skills Development Act and the Department of Social Development Act were enacted in July 2005.

=== Recombined ===
Upon taking office in February 2006, the Conservative government of Stephen Harper announced it would recombine the two departments, and through a series of orders in council, Social Development Canada was folded into HRSDC.

From 2006 to 2008, Social Development's preceding role was reflected by styling the Minister of Human Resources and Skills Development as the "Minister of Human Resources and Social Development", and by changing the department's applied title to "Human Resources and Social Development Canada". This practice ended in late 2008 when the title was changed to "Minister of Human Resources and Skills Development." The post was later referred to as "Minister of Employment and Social Development" when the department was renamed.

On November 4, 2015, the department underwent machinery of government changes which saw the employment responsibilities transfer to the Labour Minister resulting in the newly re-titled Minister of Employment, Workforce and Labour. The Social Development aspects were then shaped into the Minister of Families, Children and Social Development.

On March 14, 2025, responsibility for the department was consolidated into a single ministerial post, the Minister of Jobs and Families.

== Sub-agencies, programs and activities ==
Sub-agencies of ESDC include:

- Service Canada
  - Service Canada Centres for Youth
- Canada Student Loans Program
- Canada Employment Insurance Commission
- Canada Pension Plan
- National Seniors Council
- Seasonal Agricultural Workers Program
- Federal Mediation and Conciliation Service
- Canada Mortgage and Housing Corporation
- Canada Industrial Relations Board

ESDC delivers $87 billion in programs and services and has approximately 24,000 employees. Approximately 19,000 of those employees work under the Service Canada banner.

== Officials and structure ==
Minister of Jobs and Families
  - Deputy Minister of Labour
  - Senior Associate Deputy Minister of Labour
  - Business Lead, Benefits Delivery Modernization
  - Associate Deputy Minister of Labour and Chief Operating Officer for Service Canada

== Controversies ==
=== 2012/2013 privacy breach ===
On January 11, 2013, Minister Diane Finley announced that a hard drive containing information of 583,000 student loan borrowers had been lost from a Canada Student Loans Program (CSLP)/HRSDC office in Gatineau, Quebec. Borrowers who registered a loan between 2000 and 2006 were potentially affected. The information on the hard drive contained full names, social insurance numbers, contact information, and loan balances. The hard drive also contained information on 250 HRSDC employees. Concerns of privacy breaches and identity theft led to the filing of three class-action suits against the federal government on behalf of the affected students.

On January 18, 2013, the Office of the Privacy Commissioner of Canada stated that a formal investigation had been launched. The stated outcome of this investigation was to provide information to organizations and individuals to improve privacy protection.

The RCMP was notified but is waiting for the outcome of the Office of the Privacy Commissioner of Canada's investigation to do their own investigation.

This incident has become known as "1 in 60", representing the ratio of affected individuals to the Canadian population as a whole.

=== Canada Summer Jobs program ===
In 2018, the government of Justin Trudeau introduced a new mandatory criteria for eligible employers and projects of the Canada Summer Jobs program, for which "the core mandate of the organization must respect individual human rights in Canada, including the values underlying the Canadian Charter of Rights and Freedoms (Charter) as well as other rights" like the "reproductive rights and the right to be free from discrimination". After facing nine ongoing Federal Court challenges and the complaints of the Canadian Conference of Catholic Bishops in union with the Canadian Council of Christian Charities, the requirement was rewritten and became a mandatory point for eligible projects and job activities, which must not "actively work to undermine or restrict a woman's access to sexual and reproductive health services".

== See also ==
- Poverty in Canada
