= Minister of Diversity, Inclusion and Persons with Disabilities =

Canadian cabinet position (2019–2025)

- Ministre de la Diversité, de l’Inclusion et des Personnes en situation de handicap
- Incumbent; Vacant since March 14, 2025
- Department of Canadian Heritage
- Style: The Honourable
- Member of: Cabinet; Privy Council
- Appointer: Governor General of Canada
- Term length: At His Majesty's pleasure
- Inaugural holder: Bardish Chagger
- Formation: November 20, 2019
- Final holder: Kamal Khera
- Abolished: 14 March 2025
- Salary: CA$299,900 (2024)
- Website: www.canada.ca/canadian-heritage

The Minister of Diversity, Inclusion and Persons with Disabilities (French: ministre de la Diversité, de l’Inclusion et des Personnes en situation de handicap) was an office of the Cabinet of Canada from 2019 to 2025. The minister was associated with the Department of Canadian Heritage. On March 14, 2025 the position was discontinued, its responsibilities being consolidated into the new position of Minister of Jobs and Families.

Multiculturalism has been part of the portfolio from the former multiculturalism and citizenship portfolio, which was last held in 2015 and re-created in 2019 with additional responsibilities for youth issues.

== List of ministers ==
Key:

Liberal Party of Canada

No.	Portrait	Name	Term of office		Political party	Ministry
Minister of Diversity and Inclusion and Youth
1		Bardish Chagger	November 20, 2019	October 26, 2021	Liberal	29 (J. Trudeau)
Minister of Housing and Diversity and Inclusion
2		Ahmed Hussen	October 26, 2021	July 26, 2023	Liberal	29 (J. Trudeau)
Minister of Diversity, Inclusion and Persons with Disabilities
3		Kamal Khera	July 26, 2023	March 14, 2025	Liberal	29 (J. Trudeau)
