= Patty Hajdu =

Canadian politician (born 1966)

The Honourable Patty Hajdu PC MP
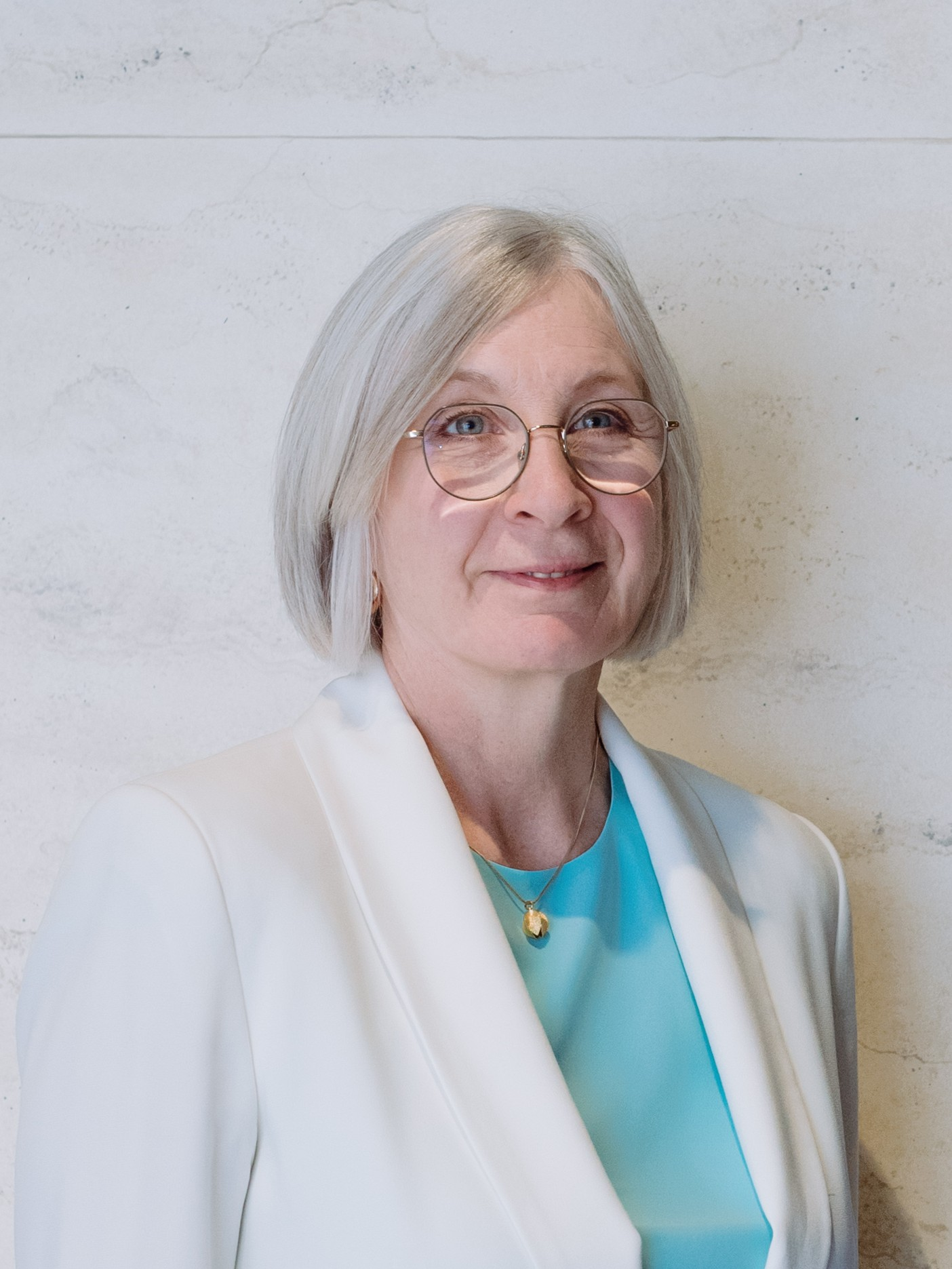
- Hajdu in 2026

Minister of Jobs and Families
- Incumbent
- Assumed office May 13, 2025
- Prime Minister: Mark Carney
- Preceded by: Steven MacKinnon

Minister responsible for the Federal Economic Development Agency for Northern Ontario
- Incumbent
- Assumed office May 13, 2025
- Prime Minister: Mark Carney
- Preceded by: Herself (Note: The position was vacant from March 14 to May 13, 2025. As an agency of Innovation, Science and Economic Development Canada, responsibility for the Federal Economic Development Agency for Northern Ontario was held during this period by the Minister of Innovation, Science and Industry.)
- In office October 26, 2021 – March 14, 2025
- Prime Minister: Justin Trudeau
- Preceded by: Mélanie Joly
- Succeeded by: Herself

Minister of Indigenous Services
- In office October 26, 2021 – May 13, 2025
- Prime Minister: Justin Trudeau; Mark Carney
- Preceded by: Marc Miller
- Succeeded by: Mandy Gull-Masty

Minister of Health
- In office November 20, 2019 – October 26, 2021
- Prime Minister: Justin Trudeau
- Preceded by: Ginette Petitpas Taylor
- Succeeded by: Jean-Yves Duclos

Minister of Employment, Workforce Development and Labour
- In office January 10, 2017 – November 20, 2019
- Prime Minister: Justin Trudeau
- Preceded by: MaryAnn Mihychuk
- Succeeded by: Carla Qualtrough (Employment and Workforce Development); Filomena Tassi (Labour)

Minister of Status of Women
- In office November 4, 2015 – January 10, 2017
- Prime Minister: Justin Trudeau
- Preceded by: Kellie Leitch
- Succeeded by: Maryam Monsef

Member of Parliament for Thunder Bay—Superior North
- Incumbent
- Assumed office October 19, 2015
- Preceded by: Bruce Hyer

Personal details
- Born: March 11, 1966 (age 60) Montreal, Quebec, Canada
- Party: Liberal
- Education: Lakehead University (BA); University of Victoria (MPA)

Patricia A. Hajdu (/ˈhaɪduː/; born March 11, 1966) is a Canadian politician who has been Minister of Jobs and Families since May 13, 2025. A member of the Liberal Party, Hajdu was first elected to the House of Commons in the 2015 election and serves as the member of Parliament (MP) for Thunder Bay—Superior North. Hajdu is also the minister responsible for FedNor and previously served as the minister of status of women (2015–2017), minister of employment, workforce development and labour (2017–2019), minister of health (2019–2021) and minister of Indigenous services (2021–2025).

== Early life, education and career ==
Born in Montreal, Hajdu spent her early years in Chisholm, Minnesota, U.S. with her brother Sean Patrick Hajdu (1969–2003), raised by her aunt and uncle. Her Hungarian last name comes from her stepfather.

At 12 years old, Hajdu moved to Thunder Bay to live with her mother. Due to a tumultuous relationship, she ended up living on her own at age 16, while she finished high school. After graduating, she got a job in Thunder Bay through an employment insurance initiative, at a non-profit adult-literacy group, where she trained in graphic design.

Hajdu then attended Lakehead University, graduating with a Bachelor of Arts in Anthropology. In 2015, she received a Master of Public Administration from the University of Victoria.

Hajdu worked mainly in the field of harm prevention, homelessness, and substance misuse prevention, including nine years as the head of the drug awareness committee of the Thunder Bay District Health Unit. She also worked as a creative director and graphic designer in marketing. Prior to her election in 2015 she was the executive director at Shelter House, the city's largest homeless shelter.

== Political career ==
=== Minister of Status of Women ===
On November 4, 2015, she sworn into Prime Minister Justin Trudeau's Cabinet, as minister of status of women. In July 2016, she formed an advisory council to help develop of Canada's strategy against gender-based violence.

=== Minister of Employment, Workforce Development and Labour ===
She was sworn in as minister of employment, workforce development and labour on January 10, 2017.

On October 29, 2018, Minister Hajdu, alongside Status of Women Minister Maryam Monsef and President of the Treasury Board and Minister for Digital Government Scott Brison, introduced pay equity legislation for federally regulated workplaces.

=== Minister of Health ===
Hajdu was shuffled to minister of health following the 2019 federal election.

==== COVID-19 ====
As health minister from 2020 to 2021, Hajdu oversaw Health Canada and the Public Health Agency of Canada, key agencies coordinating the Canadian government's response to the COVID-19 pandemic.

On March 25, 2020, Hajdu informed the Senate that she would invoke the Quarantine Act effective at midnight, federally mandating that all travellers (excluding essential workers) returning to the country must self-isolate for 14 days, prohibiting those who are symptomatic from using public transit as transport to their place of self-isolation, and prohibiting self-isolation in settings where they may come in contact with those, who are vulnerable (people with pre-existing conditions and the elderly).

=== Minister of Indigenous Services ===
In October 2021, Hajdu was shuffled to the Indigenous Services portfolio following the 2021 federal election.

=== Minister of Jobs and Families ===
Following Mark Carney's victory in the 2025 Liberal Party of Canada leadership election, Hajdu was appointed as minister of jobs and families.

==== 2025 Air Canada flight attendants strike ====
A few hours after the 2025 Air Canada flight attendants strike began, Hajdu announced that she had exercised her power under section 107 of the Canada Labour Code (CLC) to direct the Canada Industrial Relations Board (CIRB) to force arbitration between the Canadian Union of Public Employees (CUPE) and Air Canada to end the strike.

President of the Air Canada Component of CUPE Wesley Lesosky said in a statement: "The Liberals are violating our charter rights to take job action and giving Air Canada exactly what they want — hours and hours of unpaid labour from underpaid flight attendants". CIRB ordered the flight attendants to return to work at 14:00 EDT on August 17, and Air Canada announced that they would start resuming flights in response. However, the union called the return-to-work order unconstitutional and vowed to continue the strike, which resulted in a further cancellation of the planned flights.

== Personal life ==
Hajdu is the mother of two adult sons. At the time of the 2025 Canadian federal election, she lived in Shuniah, Ontario.

== Electoral record ==
2025 Canadian federal election: Thunder Bay—Superior North
** Preliminary results — Not yet official **
Party	Candidate	Votes	%	±%	Expenditures
Liberal	Patty Hajdu	25,140	55.23	+14.83	
Conservative	Bob Herman	16,274	35.75	+11.79	
New Democratic	Joy Wakefield	3,239	7.12	–20.59	
People's	Amos Bradley	457	1.00	–4.89	
Green	John Malcolm Northey	410	0.90	–0.87	
Total valid votes/expense limit					
Total rejected ballots					
Turnout		45,520	67.84		
Eligible voters		67,100			
Liberal notional hold		Swing		+1.52	
Source: Elections Canada

2021 Canadian federal election: Thunder Bay—Superior North
Party	Candidate	Votes	%	±%	Expenditures
Liberal	Patty Hajdu	16,893	40.7	-2.2	$94,557.23
New Democratic	Chantelle Bryson	11,244	27.1	+6.0	$40,417.50
Conservative	Joshua Taylor	10,035	24.2	-1.4	$7,497.92
People's	Rick Daines	2,465	5.9	+4.2	$0.00
Green	Amanda Moddejonge	735	1.8	-6.6	$2,082.49
Libertarian	Alexander Vodden	111	0.3	0.0	$0.00
Total valid votes		41,483			
Total rejected ballots		311			
Turnout		41,794	63.61		
Eligible voters		65,703			
Source: Elections Canada

2019 Canadian federal election: Thunder Bay—Superior North
Party	Candidate	Votes	%	±%	Expenditures
Liberal	Patty Hajdu	18,502	42.85	-2.14	$94,089.37
Conservative	Frank Pullia	11,036	25.56	+8.13	$33,102.79
New Democratic	Anna Betty Achneepineskum	9,126	21.14	-2.04	$42,426.79
Green	Bruce Hyer	3,639	8.43	-5.37	$23,709.76
People's	Youssef Khanjari	734	1.70	–	$5,389.00
Libertarian	Alexander Vodden	140	0.32	–	$1,783.16
Total valid votes/expense limit		43,177	99.05		
Total rejected ballots		416	0.95		
Turnout		43,593	65.48	-3.22	
Eligible voters		66,579			
Liberal hold		Swing		-5.13	
Source: Elections Canada

2015 Canadian federal election: Thunder Bay-Superior North
Party	Candidate	Votes	%	±%	Expenditures
Liberal	Patty Hajdu	20,069	44.99	+28.51	$90,854.71
New Democratic	Andrew Foulds	10,339	23.18	-26.97	$121,837.34
Conservative	Richard Harvey	7,775	17.43	-12.22	$59,457.39
Green	Bruce Hyer	6,155	13.80	+10.78	$123,098.51
Independent	Robert Skaf	270	0.61	–	$6,944.34
Total valid votes/Expense limit		44,608	100.0		$248,538.44
Total rejected ballots		178	–	–	
Turnout		44,786	–	–	
Eligible voters		63,995			
Source: Elections Canada

== Notes ==
29th Canadian Ministry (2015–2025) – Cabinet of Justin Trudeau
Cabinet posts (4)
Predecessor	Office	Successor
Marc Miller	Minister of Indigenous Services; October 26, 2021 – May 13, 2025	Mandy Gull-Masty
Ginette Petitpas Taylor	Minister of Health; November 20, 2019 – October 26, 2021	Jean-Yves Duclos
MaryAnn Mihychuk	Minister of Employment, Workforce, and Labour; January 10, 2017 – November 20, 2019	Carla Qualtrough (Employment and Workforce Development); Filomena Tassi (Labour)
Kellie Leitch	Minister of Status of Women; November 4, 2015 – January 10, 2017	Maryam Monsef
Order of precedence
Preceded by Anita Anand as Member of the Cabinet	Order of Precedence of Canada as Member of the Cabinet	Succeeded by Marc Miller as Member of the Cabinet
