= Minister of Families, Children and Social Development =

Canadian cabinet position (2003–2025)

- Ministre de la Famille, des Enfants et du Développement social
- Department of Employment and Social Development
- Style: The Honourable
- Member of: Cabinet; Privy Council
- Appointer: Monarch (represented by the governor general); on the advice of the prime minister
- Term length: At His Majesty's pleasure
- Inaugural holder: Liza Frulla
- Formation: 12 December 2003
- Salary: CA$299,900 (2024)
- Website: www.hrsdc.gc.ca

The minister of families, children and social development (French: ministre de la famille, des enfants et du développement social) is a minister of the Crown in the Cabinet of Canada. The associated department is Employment and Social Development Canada. On March 14, 2025 the position was abolished, its responsibilities being consolidated into the new position of Minister of Jobs and Families.

== History ==
The position of Minister of Social Development was created in 2000 to be responsible for overseeing Social Development Canada a new federal department concerned with the needs of seniors, children, families and people with disabilities. Prior to 2003, these responsibilities were under the Minister of Human Resources Development.

On February 4, 2006, Prime Minister Stephen Harper merged the personnel and responsibilities of Social Development Canada into Human Resources and Skills Development Canada using an Order in Council, and did not name anybody to the post of Minister of Social Development.

On November 4, 2015, Prime Minister Justin Trudeau transferred the employment responsibilities to the Minister of Labour and changed the name of the portfolio to Minister of Families, Children and Social Development.

The position was abolished on March 14, 2025, its responsibilities being consolidated into the new position of Minister of Jobs and Families.

== Role ==
The Minister is also responsible for the:

- Canada Pension Plan: Pension Appeals Board
- Canada Pension Plan: Review Tribunals

== List of ministers ==
Key:

Liberal Party of Canada
Conservative Party of Canada

No.	Portrait	Name	Term of office		Political party	Ministry
Minister of Social Development
1		Liza Frulla	December 12, 2003	July 19, 2004	Liberal	27 (Martin)
2		Ken Dryden	July 20, 2004	February 5, 2006	Liberal	27 (Martin)
Minister of Human Resources and Social Development
3		Diane Finley	February 6, 2006	January 3, 2007	Conservative	28 (Harper)
4		Monte Solberg	January 4, 2007	October 29, 2008	Conservative	28 (Harper)
Minister of Human Resources and Skills Development
(3)		Diane Finley	October 30, 2008	July 15, 2013	Conservative	28 (Harper)
Minister of Employment and Social Development
5		Jason Kenney	July 15, 2013	February 9, 2015	Conservative	28 (Harper)
7		Pierre Poilievre	February 9, 2015	November 4, 2015	Conservative	28 (Harper)
Minister of Families, Children and Social Development
8		Jean-Yves Duclos	November 4, 2015	November 20, 2019	Liberal	29 (J. Trudeau)
9		Ahmed Hussen	November 20, 2019	October 26, 2021	Liberal	29 (J. Trudeau)
10		Karina Gould	October 26, 2021	July 26, 2023	Liberal	29 (J. Trudeau)
11		Jenna Sudds	July 26, 2023	March 14, 2025	Liberal	29 (J. Trudeau)
Position discontinued, replaced by the Minister of Jobs and Families

=== Minister of State for Social Development ===
On July 15, 2012, MP Candice Bergen was appointed Minister of State for Social Development, a newly created position that was abolished two years later.

No.	Portrait	Name	Term of office		Political party	Ministry
Minister of State for Social Development
6		Candice Bergen	July 15, 2013	November 4, 2015	Conservative	28 (Harper)
