= 29th Canadian Ministry =

Government cabinet of Canada (2015–2025)

29th Canadian Ministry 29e conseil des ministres du Canada
- 29th ministry of Canada

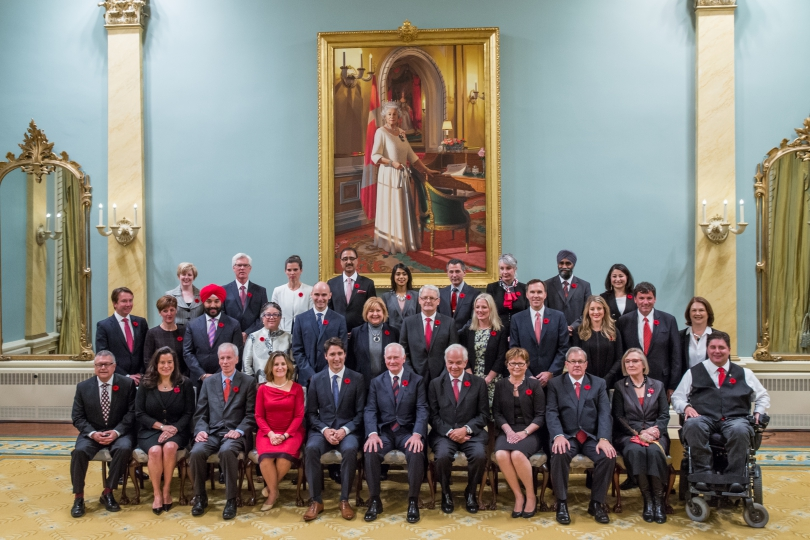
- Date formed: November 4, 2015
- Date dissolved: March 14, 2025

People and organizations
- Monarch: Elizabeth II (2015–2022); Charles III (2022–2025)
- Governor General: David Johnston (2015–2017); Julie Payette (2017–2021); Mary Simon (2021–2025)
- Prime Minister: Justin Trudeau
- Prime Minister's history: Premiership of Justin Trudeau
- Deputy Prime Minister: Chrystia Freeland (2019–2024)
- No. of ministers: 39
- Ministers removed: 34
- Member party: Liberal
- Status in legislature: Majority (2015–2019); Minority (2019–2025) (Note: Confidence and supply agreement with the New Democratic Party from March 2022 to September 2024)
- Opposition cabinet: 42nd (2015–2019); 43rd (2019–2021); 44th (2021–2025)
- Opposition party: Conservative
- Opposition leader: Rona Ambrose (2015–2017); Andrew Scheer (2017–2020); Erin O'Toole (2020–2022); Candice Bergen (2022); Pierre Poilievre (2022–2025)

History
- Incoming formation: 2015 federal election
- Outgoing formation: 2025 Liberal leadership election
- Elections: 2015, 2019, 2021
- Legislature terms: 42nd Canadian Parliament; 43rd Canadian Parliament; 44th Canadian Parliament
- Budgets: 2016, 2017, 2018, 2019, 2021, 2022, 2023, 2024
- Predecessor: 28th Canadian Ministry
- Successor: 30th Canadian Ministry

The Twenty-Ninth Canadian Ministry was the Cabinet, chaired by Prime Minister Justin Trudeau, that began governing Canada shortly before the opening of the 42nd Parliament. The original members were sworn in during a ceremony held at Rideau Hall on November 4, 2015. Those who were not already members of the Privy Council were sworn into it in the same ceremony. At the time of its dissolution, the Cabinet consisted of 35 members including Trudeau, with 17 women and 18 men. When the ministry was first sworn in, with 15 men and 15 women (aside from Trudeau), it became the first gender-balanced cabinet in Canadian history.

Trudeau carried out four major cabinet shuffles: one in 2018, one in 2021, one in 2023, and another in 2024.

On October 26, 2021, one month after the 2021 Canadian federal election that gave the governing Liberal Party a second minority mandate; the ministry underwent a cabinet shuffle, resulting in many promotions, demotions, and removals from cabinet.

Following resignations by major Trudeau cabinet leaders in December 2024, the government entered a political crisis as multiple Liberal party members and all opposition parties called for Trudeau's resignation and a new election. Trudeau announced his intention to resign as prime minister and party leader in early January 2025, and was succeeded by Mark Carney on March 14, 2025.

== List of ministers ==
=== By minister ===
The list below follows the Canadian order of precedence, which is established by the chronological order of appointment to the King's Privy Council for Canada, with former ministers being listed last in order of appointment to the Privy Council.

Portrait	Minister	Portfolio	Tenure
	Justin Trudeau	Prime Minister	November 4, 2015 – March 14, 2025
	Justin Trudeau	Minister of Intergovernmental Affairs and Youth	November 4, 2015 – July 18, 2018
	Lawrence MacAulay	Minister of Agriculture and Agri-Food	November 4, 2015 – March 1, 2019
	Lawrence MacAulay	Minister of Veterans Affairs; Associate Minister of National Defence	March 1, 2019 – July 26, 2023
	Lawrence MacAulay	Minister of Agriculture and Agri-Food	July 26, 2023 – March 14, 2025
	Dominic LeBlanc	Leader of the Government in the House of Commons	November 4, 2015 – August 19, 2016
	Dominic LeBlanc	Minister of Fisheries, Oceans and the Canadian Coast Guard	May 31, 2016 – July 18, 2018
	Dominic LeBlanc	Minister of Intergovernmental and Northern Affairs and Internal Trade	July 18, 2018 – November 20, 2019
	Dominic LeBlanc	President of the Queen's Privy Council for Canada	July 18, 2018 – October 26, 2021
	Dominic LeBlanc	Minister of Intergovernmental Affairs, Infrastructure and Communities (Note: Title of office was "Minister of Intergovernmental Affairs" until October 26, 2021.)	August 18, 2020 – July 26, 2023
	Dominic LeBlanc	Minister of Public Safety, Democratic Institutions and Intergovernmental Affairs	July 26, 2023 – December 20, 2024
	Dominic LeBlanc	Minister of Finance	December 16, 2024 – March 14, 2025
	Dominic LeBlanc	Minister of Intergovernmental Affairs	December 20, 2024 – March 14, 2025
	Jean-Yves Duclos	Minister of Families, Children and Social Development	November 4, 2015 – November 20, 2019
	Jean-Yves Duclos	President of the Treasury Board	November 20, 2019 – October 26, 2021
	Jean-Yves Duclos	Minister of Health	October 26, 2021 – July 26, 2023
	Jean-Yves Duclos	Minister of Public Services and Procurement	July 26, 2023 – March 14, 2025
	Mélanie Joly	Minister of Canadian Heritage	November 4, 2015 – July 18, 2018
	Mélanie Joly	Minister of Tourism, Official Languages and La Francophonie	July 18, 2018 – November 20, 2019
	Mélanie Joly	Minister of Economic Development and Official Languages	November 20, 2019 – October 26, 2021
	Mélanie Joly	Minister of Foreign Affairs	October 26, 2021 – March 14, 2025
	Diane Lebouthillier	Minister of National Revenue	November 4, 2015 – July 26, 2023
	Diane Lebouthillier	Minister of Fisheries, Oceans and the Canadian Coast Guard	July 26, 2023 – March 14, 2025
	Harjit Sajjan	Minister of National Defence	November 4, 2015 – October 26, 2021
	Harjit Sajjan	Minister of International Development	October 26, 2021 – July 26, 2023
	Harjit Sajjan	Minister responsible for the Pacific Economic Development Agency of Canada	October 26, 2021 – March 14, 2025
	Harjit Sajjan	President of the King's Privy Council for Canada	July 26, 2023 – March 14, 2025
	Harjit Sajjan	Minister of Emergency Preparedness	July 26, 2023 – March 14, 2025
	Patty Hajdu	Minister of Status of Women	November 4, 2015 – January 10, 2017
	Patty Hajdu	Minister of Employment, Workforce Development and Labour	January 10, 2017 – November 20, 2019
	Patty Hajdu	Minister of Health	November 20, 2019 – October 26, 2021
	Patty Hajdu	Minister of Indigenous Services	October 26, 2021 – March 14, 2025
	Patty Hajdu	Minister responsible for the Federal Economic Development Agency for Northern Ontario	October 26, 2021 – March 14, 2025
	François-Philippe Champagne	Minister of International Trade	January 10, 2017 – July 18, 2018
	François-Philippe Champagne	Minister of Infrastructure and Communities	July 18, 2018 – November 20, 2019
	François-Philippe Champagne	Minister of Foreign Affairs	November 20, 2019 – January 12, 2021
	François-Philippe Champagne	Minister of Innovation, Science and Industry; Registrar General of Canada	January 12, 2021 – March 14, 2025
	Ahmed Hussen	Minister of Immigration, Refugees and Citizenship	January 10, 2017 – November 20, 2019
	Ahmed Hussen	Minister of Families, Children and Social Development	November 20, 2019 – October 26, 2021
	Ahmed Hussen	Minister of Housing and Diversity and Inclusion	October 26, 2021 – July 26, 2023
	Ahmed Hussen	Minister of International Development	July 26, 2023 – March 14, 2025
	Ginette Petitpas Taylor	Minister of Health	August 28, 2017 – November 20, 2019
	Ginette Petitpas Taylor	Minister of Official Languages	October 26, 2021 – July 26, 2023
	Ginette Petitpas Taylor	Minister responsible for the Atlantic Canada Opportunities Agency	October 26, 2021 – July 26, 2023
	Ginette Petitpas Taylor	Minister of Veterans Affairs; Associate Minister of National Defence	July 26, 2023 – December 20, 2024
	Ginette Petitpas Taylor	Minister of Employment, Workforce Development and Official Languages	November 20, 2024 – December 20, 2024
	Ginette Petitpas Taylor	President of the Treasury Board	December 20, 2024 – March 14, 2025
	Bill Blair	Minister of Border Security and Organized Crime Reduction	July 18, 2018 – November 20, 2019
	Bill Blair	Minister of Public Safety and Emergency Preparedness	November 20, 2019 – October 26, 2021
	Bill Blair	Minister of Emergency Preparedness	October 26, 2021 – July 26, 2023
	Bill Blair	President of the King's Privy Council for Canada (Note: Title of office was "President of the Queen's Privy Council for Canada" until October 12, 2022.)	October 26, 2021 – July 26, 2023
	Bill Blair	Minister of National Defence	July 26, 2023 – March 14, 2025
	Mary Ng	Minister of Small Business and Export Promotion	July 18, 2018 – November 20, 2019
	Mary Ng	Minister of Export Promotion, International Trade and Economic Development (Note: Title of office was "Minister of Small Business, Export Promotion and International Trade" until October 26, 2021, and then "Minister of International Trade, Export Promotion, Small Business and Economic Development" from October 26, 2021 to July 26, 2023)	November 20, 2019 – March 14, 2025
	Jonathan Wilkinson	Minister of Fisheries, Oceans and the Canadian Coast Guard	July 18, 2018 – November 20, 2019
	Jonathan Wilkinson	Minister of Environment and Climate Change	November 20, 2019 – October 26, 2021
	Jonathan Wilkinson	Minister of Energy and Natural Resources (Note: Title of office was "Minister of Natural Resources" until July 26, 2023.)	October 26, 2021 – March 14, 2025
	Anita Anand	Minister of Public Services and Procurement	November 20, 2019 – October 26, 2021
	Anita Anand	Minister of National Defence	October 26, 2021 – July 26, 2023
	Anita Anand	President of the Treasury Board	July 26, 2023 – December 20, 2024
	Anita Anand	Minister of Transport	September 19, 2024 – December 20, 2024
	Anita Anand	Minister of Transport and Internal Trade	December 20, 2024 – March 14, 2025
	Steven Guilbeault	Minister of Canadian Heritage	November 20, 2019 – October 26, 2021
	Steven Guilbeault	Minister of Environment and Climate Change	October 26, 2021 – March 14, 2025
	Marc Miller	Minister of Indigenous Services	November 20, 2019 – October 26, 2021
	Marc Miller	Minister of Crown–Indigenous Relations	October 26, 2021 – July 26, 2023
	Marc Miller	Minister of Immigration, Refugees and Citizenship	July 26, 2023 – March 14, 2025
	Mark Holland	Leader of the Government in the House of Commons	October 26, 2021 – July 26, 2023
	Mark Holland	Minister of Health	July 26, 2023 – March 14, 2025
	Gudie Hutchings	Minister of Rural Economic Development	October 26, 2021 – March 14, 2025
	Gudie Hutchings	Minister responsible for the Atlantic Canada Opportunities Agency	July 26, 2023 – March 14, 2025
	Marci Ien	Minister for Women and Gender Equality and Youth	October 26, 2021 – March 14, 2025
	Kamal Khera	Minister of Seniors	October 26, 2021 – July 26, 2023
	Kamal Khera	Minister of Diversity, Inclusion and Persons with Disabilities	July 26, 2023 – March 14, 2025
	Pascale St-Onge	Minister of Sport	October 26, 2021 – July 26, 2023
	Pascale St-Onge	Minister responsible for the Economic Development Agency of Canada for the Regions of Quebec	October 26, 2021 – July 26, 2023
	Pascale St-Onge	Minister of Canadian Heritage	July 26, 2023 – March 14, 2025
	Pascale St-Onge	Minister of Tourism	February 6, 2025 – March 14, 2025
	Pascale St-Onge	Minister responsible for the Economic Development Agency of Canada for the Regions of Quebec	February 6, 2025 – March 14, 2025
	Gary Anandasangaree	Minister of Crown–Indigenous Relations	July 26, 2023 – December 20, 2024
	Gary Anandasangaree	Minister of Crown–Indigenous Relations and Northern Affairs	December 20, 2024 – March 14, 2025
	Gary Anandasangaree	Minister responsible for the Canadian Northern Economic Development Agency	December 20, 2024 – March 14, 2025
	Terry Beech	Minister of Citizens' Services	July 26, 2023 – March 14, 2025
	Ya'ara Saks	Minister of Mental Health and Addictions; Associate Minister of Health	July 26, 2023 – March 14, 2025
	Jenna Sudds	Minister of Families, Children and Social Development	July 26, 2023 – March 14, 2025
	Rechie Valdez	Minister of Small Business	July 26, 2023 – March 14, 2025
	Arif Virani	Minister of Justice and Attorney General of Canada	July 26, 2023 – March 14, 2025
	Steven MacKinnon	Leader of the Government in the House of Commons (interim)	January 8, 2024 – July 19, 2024
	Steven MacKinnon	Minister of Labour	July 19, 2024 – December 20, 2024
	Steven MacKinnon	Minister of Seniors	July 19, 2024 – December 20, 2024
	Steven MacKinnon	Minister of Employment, Workforce Development and Labour	December 20, 2024 – March 14, 2025
	Steven MacKinnon	Leader of the Government in the House of Commons (interim)	January 24, 2025 – March 14, 2025
	Rachel Bendayan	Minister of Official Languages	December 20, 2024 – March 14, 2025
	Rachel Bendayan	Associate Minister of Public Safety	December 20, 2024 – March 14, 2025
	Élisabeth Brière	Minister of National Revenue	December 20, 2024 – March 14, 2025
	Terry Duguid	Minister of Sport	December 20, 2024 – March 14, 2025
	Terry Duguid	Minister responsible for Prairies Economic Development Canada	December 20, 2024 – March 14, 2025
	Nate Erskine-Smith	Minister of Housing, Infrastructure and Communities	December 20, 2024 – March 14, 2025
	Darren Fisher	Minister of Veterans Affairs; Associate Minister of National Defence	December 20, 2024 – March 14, 2025
	David McGuinty	Minister of Public Safety	December 20, 2024 – March 14, 2025
	Ruby Sahota	Minister of Democratic Institutions	December 20, 2024 – March 14, 2025
	Ruby Sahota	Minister responsible for the Federal Economic Development Agency for Southern Ontario	December 20, 2024 – March 14, 2025
	Joanne Thompson	Minister of Seniors	December 20, 2024 – March 14, 2025
	Hunter Tootoo	Minister of Fisheries, Oceans and the Canadian Coast Guard	November 4, 2015 – May 31, 2016
	Stéphane Dion	Minister of Foreign Affairs	November 4, 2015 – January 10, 2017
	John McCallum	Minister of Immigration, Refugees and Citizenship	November 4, 2015 – January 10, 2017
	MaryAnn Mihychuk	Minister of Employment, Workforce Development and Labour	November 4, 2015 – January 10, 2017
	Judy Foote	Minister of Public Services and Procurement; Receiver General for Canada	November 4, 2015 – August 24, 2017
	Kent Hehr	Minister of Veterans Affairs; Associate Minister of National Defence	November 4, 2015 – August 28, 2017
	Kent Hehr	Minister of Sport and Persons with Disabilities	August 28, 2017 – January 25, 2018
	Scott Brison	President of the Treasury Board	November 4, 2015 – January 14, 2019
	Scott Brison	Minister of Digital Government	July 18, 2018 – January 14, 2019
	Jody Wilson-Raybould	Minister of Justice and Attorney General of Canada	November 4, 2015 – January 14, 2019
	Jody Wilson-Raybould	Minister of Veterans Affairs; Associate Minister of National Defence	January 14, 2019 – February 12, 2019
	Jane Philpott	Minister of Health	November 4, 2015 – August 28, 2017
	Jane Philpott	Minister of Indigenous Services	August 28, 2017 – January 14, 2019
	Jane Philpott	President of the Treasury Board	January 14, 2019 – March 4, 2019
	Jane Philpott	Minister of Digital Government	January 14, 2019 – March 4, 2019
	Ralph Goodale	Minister of Public Safety and Emergency Preparedness	November 4, 2015 – November 20, 2019
	Amarjeet Sohi	Minister of Infrastructure and Communities	November 4, 2015 – July 18, 2018
	Amarjeet Sohi	Minister of Natural Resources	July 18, 2018 – November 20, 2019
	Kirsty Duncan	Minister of Science	November 4, 2015 – July 18, 2018
	Kirsty Duncan	Minister of Sport and Persons with Disabilities	January 25, 2018 – July 18, 2018
	Kirsty Duncan	Minister of Science and Sport	July 18, 2018 – November 20, 2019
	Bill Morneau	Minister of Finance	November 4, 2015 – August 18, 2020
	Navdeep Bains	Minister of Innovation, Science and Industry (Note: Title of office was "Minister of Innovation, Science and Economic Development" until November 20, 2019.); Registrar General of Canada	November 4, 2015 – January 12, 2021
	Marc Garneau	Minister of Transport	November 4, 2015 – January 12, 2021
	Marc Garneau	Minister of Foreign Affairs	January 12, 2021 – October 26, 2021
	Jim Carr	Minister of Natural Resources	November 4, 2015 – July 18, 2018
	Jim Carr	Minister of International Trade Diversification	July 18, 2018 – November 20, 2019
	Jim Carr	Minister without Portfolio	January 12, 2021 – October 26, 2021
	Catherine McKenna	Minister of Environment and Climate Change	November 4, 2015 – November 20, 2019
	Catherine McKenna	Minister of Infrastructure and Communities	November 20, 2019 – October 26, 2021
	Maryam Monsef	President of the Queen's Privy Council for Canada	November 4, 2015 – January 10, 2017
	Maryam Monsef	Minister of Democratic Institutions	November 4, 2015 – January 10, 2017
	Maryam Monsef	Minister for Women and Gender Equality (Note: Title of office was "Minister of Status of Women" until December 13, 2018.)	January 10, 2017 – October 26, 2021
	Maryam Monsef	Minister of International Development	March 1, 2019 – November 20, 2019
	Maryam Monsef	Minister of Rural Economic Development	November 20, 2019 – October 26, 2021
	Bardish Chagger	Minister of Small Business and Tourism	November 4, 2015 – July 18, 2018
	Bardish Chagger	Leader of the Government in the House of Commons	August 19, 2016 – November 20, 2019
	Bardish Chagger	Minister of Diversity and Inclusion and Youth	November 20, 2019 – October 26, 2021
	Bernadette Jordan	Minister of Rural Economic Development	January 14, 2019 – November 20, 2019
	Bernadette Jordan	Minister of Fisheries, Oceans, and the Canadian Coast Guard	November 20, 2019 – October 26, 2021
	Deb Schulte	Minister of Seniors	November 20, 2019 – October 26, 2021
	Carolyn Bennett	Minister of Indigenous and Northern Affairs	November 4, 2015 – August 28, 2017
	Carolyn Bennett	Minister of Crown–Indigenous Relations and Northern Affairs	August 28, 2017 – July 18, 2018
	Carolyn Bennett	Minister of Crown–Indigenous Relations	July 18, 2018 – October 26, 2021
	Carolyn Bennett	Minister of Mental Health and Addictions; Associate Minister of Health	October 26, 2021 – July 26, 2023
	David Lametti	Minister of Justice and Attorney General of Canada	January 14, 2019 – July 26, 2023
	Joyce Murray	President of the Treasury Board	March 18, 2019 – November 20, 2019
	Joyce Murray	Minister of Digital Government	March 18, 2019 – October 26, 2021
	Joyce Murray	Minister of Fisheries, Oceans and the Canadian Coast Guard	October 26, 2021 – July 26, 2023
	Mona Fortier	Minister of Middle Class Prosperity and Associate Minister of Finance	November 20, 2019 – October 26, 2021
	Mona Fortier	President of the Treasury Board	October 26, 2021 – July 26, 2023
	Marco Mendicino	Minister of Immigration, Refugees and Citizenship	November 20, 2019 – October 26, 2021
	Marco Mendicino	Minister of Public Safety	October 26, 2021 – July 26, 2023
	Omar Alghabra	Minister of Transport	January 12, 2021 – July 26, 2023
	Helena Jaczek	Minister responsible for the Federal Economic Development Agency for Southern Ontario	October 26, 2021 – August 31, 2022
	Helena Jaczek	Minister of Public Services and Procurement	August 31, 2022 – July 26, 2023
	Seamus O'Regan	Minister of Veterans Affairs; Associate Minister of National Defence	August 28, 2017 – January 14, 2019
	Seamus O'Regan	Minister of Indigenous Services	January 14, 2019 – November 20, 2019
	Seamus O'Regan	Minister of Natural Resources	November 20, 2019 – October 26, 2021
	Seamus O'Regan	Minister of Labour	October 26, 2021 – July 19, 2024
	Seamus O'Regan	Minister of Seniors	July 26, 2023 – July 19, 2024
	Pablo Rodríguez	Minister of Canadian Heritage and Multiculturalism	July 18, 2018 – November 20, 2019
	Pablo Rodríguez	Leader of the Government in the House of Commons	November 20, 2019 – October 26, 2021
	Pablo Rodríguez	Minister of Canadian Heritage	October 26, 2021 – July 26, 2023
	Pablo Rodríguez	Minister of Transport	July 26, 2023 – September 19, 2024
	Randy Boissonnault	Minister of Tourism	October 26, 2021 – July 26, 2023
	Randy Boissonnault	Associate Minister of Finance	October 26, 2021 – July 26, 2023
	Randy Boissonnault	Minister of Employment, Workforce Development and Official Languages	July 26, 2023 – November 20, 2024
	Chrystia Freeland	Minister of International Trade	November 4, 2015 – January 10, 2017
	Chrystia Freeland	Minister of Foreign Affairs	January 10, 2017 – November 20, 2019
	Chrystia Freeland	Deputy Prime Minister of Canada	November 20, 2019 – December 16, 2024
	Chrystia Freeland	Minister of Intergovernmental Affairs	November 20, 2019 – August 18, 2020
	Chrystia Freeland	Minister of Finance	August 18, 2020 – December 16, 2024
	Marie-Claude Bibeau	Minister of International Development (Note: Title of office was "Minister of International Development and La Francophonie" until July 18, 2018.)	November 4, 2015 – March 1, 2019
	Marie-Claude Bibeau	Minister of Agriculture and Agri-Food	March 1, 2019 – July 26, 2023
	Marie-Claude Bibeau	Minister of National Revenue	July 26, 2023 – December 20, 2024
	Carla Qualtrough	Minister of Sport and Persons with Disabilities	November 4, 2015 – August 28, 2017
	Carla Qualtrough	Minister of Public Services and Procurement and Accessibility (Note: Title of office was "Minister of Public Services and Procurement" until July 18, 2018.); Receiver General for Canada	August 28, 2017 – November 20, 2019
	Carla Qualtrough	Minister of Employment, Workforce Development and Disability Inclusion	November 20, 2019 – July 26, 2023
	Carla Qualtrough	Minister of Sport and Physical Activity	July 26, 2023 – December 20, 2024
	Filomena Tassi	Minister of Seniors	July 18, 2018 – November 20, 2019
	Filomena Tassi	Minister of Labour	November 20, 2019 – October 26, 2021
	Filomena Tassi	Minister of Public Services and Procurement	October 26, 2021 – August 31, 2022
	Filomena Tassi	Minister responsible for the Federal Economic Development Agency for Southern Ontario	August 31, 2022 – December 20, 2024
	Dan Vandal	Minister of Northern Affairs	November 20, 2019 – December 20, 2024
	Dan Vandal	Minister responsible for the Canadian Northern Economic Development Agency	October 26, 2021 – December 20, 2024
	Dan Vandal	Minister responsible for Prairies Economic Development Canada	October 26, 2021 – December 20, 2024
	Sean Fraser	Minister of Immigration, Refugees and Citizenship	October 26, 2021 – July 26, 2023
	Sean Fraser	Minister of Housing, Infrastructure and Communities	July 26, 2023 – December 20, 2024
	Karina Gould	President of the Queen's Privy Council for Canada	January 10, 2017 – July 18, 2018
	Karina Gould	Minister of Democratic Institutions	January 10, 2017 – November 20, 2019
	Karina Gould	Minister of International Development	November 20, 2019 – October 26, 2021
	Karina Gould	Minister of Families, Children and Social Development	October 26, 2021 – July 26, 2023
	Karina Gould	Leader of the Government in the House of Commons	July 26, 2023 – January 8, 2024
	Karina Gould	Leader of the Government in the House of Commons	July 19, 2024 – January 24, 2025
	Soraya Martinez Ferrada	Minister responsible for the Economic Development Agency of Canada for the Regions of Quebec	July 26, 2023 – February 6, 2025
	Soraya Martinez Ferrada	Minister of Tourism	July 26, 2023 – February 6, 2025

=== By portfolio ===
Members of the 29th Ministry
Portfolio	Minister	Tenure
Prime Minister of Canada	Justin Trudeau	November 4, 2015 – March 14, 2025
Deputy Prime Minister of Canada	Chrystia Freeland	November 20, 2019 – December 16, 2024
Associate Minister of Finance	Mona Fortier	November 20, 2019 – October 26, 2021
Associate Minister of Finance	Randy Boissonnault	October 26, 2021 – July 26, 2023
Associate Minister of Health	Carolyn Bennett	October 26, 2021 – July 26, 2023
Associate Minister of Health	Ya'ara Saks	July 26, 2023 – March 14, 2025
Associate Minister of National Defence	Kent Hehr	November 4, 2015 – August 28, 2017
Associate Minister of National Defence	Seamus O'Regan	August 28, 2017 – January 14, 2019
Associate Minister of National Defence	Jody Wilson-Raybould	January 14, 2019 – February 12, 2019
Associate Minister of National Defence	Harjit Sajjan (acting)	February 12, 2019 – March 1, 2019
Associate Minister of National Defence	Lawrence MacAulay	March 1, 2019 – July 26, 2023
Associate Minister of National Defence	Ginette Petitpas Taylor	July 26, 2023 – December 20, 2024
Associate Minister of National Defence	Darren Fisher	December 20, 2024 – March 14, 2025
Associate Minister of Public Safety	Rachel Bendayan	December 20, 2024 – March 14, 2025
Leader of the Government in the House of Commons	Dominic LeBlanc	November 4, 2015 – August 19, 2016
Leader of the Government in the House of Commons	Bardish Chagger	August 19, 2016 – November 20, 2019
Leader of the Government in the House of Commons	Pablo Rodriguez	November 20, 2019 – October 26, 2021
Leader of the Government in the House of Commons	Mark Holland	October 26, 2021 – July 26, 2023
Leader of the Government in the House of Commons	Karina Gould	July 26, 2023 – January 8, 2024
Leader of the Government in the House of Commons	Steven MacKinnon (interim)	January 8, 2024 – July 19, 2024
Leader of the Government in the House of Commons	Karina Gould	July 19, 2024 – January 24, 2025
Leader of the Government in the House of Commons	Steven MacKinnon	January 24, 2025 – March 14, 2025
Minister of Agriculture and Agri-Food	Lawrence MacAulay	November 4, 2015 – March 1, 2019
Minister of Agriculture and Agri-Food	Marie-Claude Bibeau	March 1, 2019 – July 26, 2023
Minister of Agriculture and Agri-Food	Lawrence MacAulay	July 26, 2023 – March 14, 2025
Minister responsible for the Atlantic Canada Opportunities Agency	Ginette Petitpas Taylor	October 26, 2021 – July 26, 2023
Minister responsible for the Atlantic Canada Opportunities Agency	Gudie Hutchings	July 26, 2023 – March 14, 2025
Minister of Border Security and Organized Crime Reduction	Bill Blair	July 18, 2018 – November 20, 2019
Minister of Canadian Heritage (Note: Title of office was "Minister of Canadian Heritage and Multiculturalism" from July 18, 2018 to November 20, 2019)	Mélanie Joly	November 4, 2015 – July 18, 2018
Minister of Canadian Heritage	Pablo Rodriguez	July 18, 2018 – November 20, 2019
Minister of Canadian Heritage	Steven Guilbeault	November 20, 2019 – October 26, 2021
Minister of Canadian Heritage	Pablo Rodriguez	October 26, 2021 – July 26, 2023
Minister of Canadian Heritage	Pascale St-Onge	July 26, 2023 – March 14, 2025
Minister responsible for the Canadian Northern Economic Development Agency	Dan Vandal	October 26, 2021 – December 20, 2024
Minister responsible for the Canadian Northern Economic Development Agency	Gary Anandasangaree	December 20, 2024 – present
Minister of Citizens' Services	Terry Beech	July 26, 2023 – March 14, 2025
Minister of Crown–Indigenous Relations and Northern Affairs	Carolyn Bennett	August 28, 2017 – July 18, 2018
Minister of Crown–Indigenous Relations	Carolyn Bennett	July 18, 2018 – October 26, 2021
Minister of Crown–Indigenous Relations	Marc Miller	October 26, 2021 – July 26, 2023
Minister of Crown–Indigenous Relations	Gary Anandasangaree	July 26, 2023 – December 20, 2024
Minister of Crown–Indigenous Relations and Northern Affairs	Gary Anandasangaree	December 20, 2024 – present
Minister of Democratic Institutions	Maryam Monsef	November 4, 2015 – January 10, 2017
Minister of Democratic Institutions	Karina Gould	January 10, 2017 – November 20, 2019
Minister of Democratic Institutions	Ruby Sahota	December 20, 2024 – March 14, 2025
Minister responsible for the Economic Development Agency of Canada for the Regions of Quebec	Pascale St-Onge	October 26, 2021 – July 26, 2023
Minister responsible for the Economic Development Agency of Canada for the Regions of Quebec	Soraya Martinez Ferrada	July 26, 2023 – February 6, 2025
Minister responsible for the Economic Development Agency of Canada for the Regions of Quebec	Pascale St-Onge	February 6, 2025 – March 14, 2025
Minister of Economic Development and Official Languages	Mélanie Joly	November 20, 2019 – October 26, 2021
Minister of Emergency Preparedness	Bill Blair	October 26, 2021 – July 26, 2023
Minister of Emergency Preparedness	Harjit Sajjan	July 26, 2023 – March 14, 2025
Minister of Employment, Workforce Development and Labour	MaryAnn Mihychuk	November 4, 2015 – January 10, 2017
Minister of Employment, Workforce Development and Labour	Patty Hajdu	January 10, 2017 – November 20, 2019
Minister of Employment, Workforce Development and Disability Inclusion	Carla Qualtrough	November 20, 2019 – July 26, 2023
Minister of Employment, Workforce Development and Official Languages	Randy Boissonnault	July 26, 2023 – November 20, 2024
Minister of Employment, Workforce Development and Official Languages	Ginette Petitpas Taylor	November 20, 2024 – December 20, 2024
Minister of Employment, Workforce Development and Labour	Steven MacKinnon	December 20, 2024 – March 14, 2025
Minister of Energy and Natural Resources	Jim Carr	November 4, 2015 – July 18, 2018
Minister of Energy and Natural Resources	Amarjeet Sohi	July 18, 2018 – November 20, 2019
Minister of Energy and Natural Resources	Seamus O'Regan	November 20, 2019 – October 26, 2021
Minister of Energy and Natural Resources	Jonathan Wilkinson	October 26, 2021 – present
Minister of Environment and Climate Change	Catherine McKenna	November 4, 2015 – November 20, 2019
Minister of Environment and Climate Change	Jonathan Wilkinson	November 20, 2019 – October 26, 2021
Minister of Environment and Climate Change	Steven Guilbeault	October 26, 2021 – March 14, 2025
Minister of Export Promotion, International Trade and Economic Development	Mary Ng	November 20, 2019 – March 14, 2025
Minister of Digital Government	Scott Brison	July 18, 2018 – January 14, 2019
Minister of Digital Government	Jane Philpott	January 14, 2019 – March 4, 2019
Minister of Digital Government	Carla Qualtrough (acting)	March 4, 2019 – March 18, 2019
Minister of Digital Government	Joyce Murray	March 18, 2019 – October 26, 2021
Minister of Diversity, Inclusion and Persons with Disabilities	Kamal Khera	July 26, 2023 – March 14, 2025
Minister of Diversity and Inclusion and Youth	Bardish Chagger	November 20, 2019 – October 26, 2021
Minister of Families, Children and Social Development	Jean-Yves Duclos	November 4, 2015 – November 20, 2019
Minister of Families, Children and Social Development	Ahmed Hussen	November 20, 2019 – October 26, 2021
Minister of Families, Children and Social Development	Karina Gould	October 26, 2021 – July 26, 2023
Minister of Families, Children and Social Development	Jenna Sudds	July 26, 2023 – March 14, 2025
Minister responsible for the Federal Economic Development Agency for Northern Ontario	Patty Hajdu	October 26, 2021 – March 14, 2025
Minister responsible for the Federal Economic Development Agency for Southern Ontario	Helena Jaczek	October 26, 2021 – August 31, 2022
Minister responsible for the Federal Economic Development Agency for Southern Ontario	Filomena Tassi	August 31, 2022 – December 20, 2024
Minister responsible for the Federal Economic Development Agency for Southern Ontario	Ruby Sahota	December 20, 2024 – March 14, 2025
Minister of Finance	Bill Morneau	November 4, 2015 – August 18, 2020
Minister of Finance	Chrystia Freeland	August 18, 2020 – December 16, 2024
Minister of Finance	Dominic LeBlanc	December 16, 2024 – December 20, 2024
Minister of Finance and Intergovernmental Affairs	Dominic LeBlanc	December 20, 2024 – present
Minister of Fisheries, Oceans and the Canadian Coast Guard	Hunter Tootoo	November 4, 2015 – May 31, 2016
Minister of Fisheries, Oceans and the Canadian Coast Guard	Dominic LeBlanc	May 31, 2016 – July 18, 2018
Minister of Fisheries, Oceans and the Canadian Coast Guard	Jonathan Wilkinson	July 18, 2018 – November 20, 2019
Minister of Fisheries, Oceans and the Canadian Coast Guard	Bernadette Jordan	November 20, 2019 – October 26, 2021
Minister of Fisheries, Oceans and the Canadian Coast Guard	Joyce Murray	October 26, 2021 – July 26, 2023
Minister of Fisheries, Oceans and the Canadian Coast Guard	Diane Lebouthillier	July 26, 2023 – March 14, 2025
Minister of Foreign Affairs	Stéphane Dion	November 4, 2015 – January 10, 2017
Minister of Foreign Affairs	Chrystia Freeland	January 10, 2017 – November 20, 2019
Minister of Foreign Affairs	François-Philippe Champagne	November 20, 2019 – January 12, 2021
Minister of Foreign Affairs	Marc Garneau	January 12, 2021 – October 26, 2021
Minister of Foreign Affairs	Mélanie Joly	October 26, 2021 – present
Minister of Health	Jane Philpott	November 4, 2015 – August 28, 2017
Minister of Health	Ginette Petitpas Taylor	August 28, 2017 – November 20, 2019
Minister of Health	Patty Hajdu	November 20, 2019 – October 26, 2021
Minister of Health	Jean-Yves Duclos	October 26, 2021 – July 26, 2023
Minister of Health	Mark Holland	July 26, 2023 – March 14, 2025
Minister of Housing and Diversity and Inclusion	Ahmed Hussen	October 26, 2021 – July 26, 2023
Minister of Housing, Infrastructure and Communities	Sean Fraser	July 26, 2023 – December 20, 2024
Minister of Housing, Infrastructure and Communities	Nate Erskine-Smith	December 20, 2024 – present
Minister of Immigration, Refugees and Citizenship	John McCallum	November 4, 2015 – January 10, 2017
Minister of Immigration, Refugees and Citizenship	Ahmed Hussen	January 10, 2017 – November 20, 2019
Minister of Immigration, Refugees and Citizenship	Marco Mendicino	November 20, 2019 – October 26, 2021
Minister of Immigration, Refugees and Citizenship	Sean Fraser	October 26, 2021 – July 26, 2023
Minister of Immigration, Refugees and Citizenship	Marc Miller	July 26, 2023 – March 14, 2025
Minister of Indigenous and Northern Affairs	Carolyn Bennett	November 4, 2015 – August 28, 2017
Minister of Indigenous Services	Jane Philpott	August 28, 2017 – January 14, 2019
Minister of Indigenous Services	Seamus O'Regan	January 14, 2019 – November 20, 2019
Minister of Indigenous Services	Marc Miller	November 20, 2019 – October 26, 2021
Minister of Indigenous Services	Patty Hajdu	October 26, 2021 – present
Minister of Infrastructure and Communities	Amarjeet Sohi	November 4, 2015 – July 18, 2018
Minister of Infrastructure and Communities	François-Philippe Champagne	July 18, 2018 – November 20, 2019
Minister of Infrastructure and Communities	Catherine McKenna	November 20, 2019 – October 26, 2021
Minister of Innovation, Science and Industry	Navdeep Bains	November 4, 2015 – January 12, 2021
Minister of Innovation, Science and Industry	François-Philippe Champagne	January 12, 2021 – March 14, 2025
Minister of International Development	Marie-Claude Bibeau	November 4, 2015 – March 1, 2019
Minister of International Development	Maryam Monsef	March 1, 2019 – November 20, 2019
Minister of International Development	Karina Gould	November 20, 2019 – October 26, 2021
Minister of International Development	Harjit Sajjan	October 26, 2021 – July 26, 2023
Minister of International Development	Ahmed Hussen	July 26, 2023 – March 14, 2025
Minister of International Trade	Chrystia Freeland	November 4, 2015 – January 10, 2017
Minister of International Trade	François-Philippe Champagne	January 10, 2017 – July 18, 2018
Minister of International Trade Diversification	Jim Carr	July 18, 2018 – November 20, 2019
Minister of Intergovernmental Affairs and Youth	Justin Trudeau	November 4, 2015 – July 18, 2018
Minister of Intergovernmental and Northern Affairs and Internal Trade	Dominic LeBlanc	July 18, 2018 – November 20, 2019
Minister of Intergovernmental Affairs	Chrystia Freeland	November 20, 2019 – August 18, 2020
Minister of Intergovernmental Affairs	Dominic LeBlanc	August 18, 2020 – October 26, 2021
Minister of Intergovernmental Affairs, Infrastructure and Communities	Dominic LeBlanc	October 26, 2021 –present
Minister of Justice and Attorney General of Canada	Jody Wilson-Raybould	November 4, 2015 – January 14, 2019
Minister of Justice and Attorney General of Canada	David Lametti	January 14, 2019 – July 26, 2023
Minister of Justice and Attorney General of Canada	Arif Virani	July 26, 2023 – March 14, 2025
Minister of Labour	Filomena Tassi	November 20, 2019 – October 26, 2021
Minister of Labour	Seamus O'Regan	October 26, 2021 – July 19, 2024
Minister of Labour	Steven MacKinnon	July 19, 2024 – December 20, 2024
Minister of Mental Health and Addictions	Carolyn Bennett	October 26, 2021 – July 26, 2023
Minister of Mental Health and Addictions	Ya'ara Saks	July 26, 2023 – March 14, 2025
Minister of Middle Class Prosperity	Mona Fortier	November 20, 2019 – October 26, 2021
Minister of National Defence	Harjit Sajjan	November 4, 2015 – October 26, 2021
Minister of National Defence	Anita Anand	October 26, 2021 – July 26, 2023
Minister of National Defence	Bill Blair	July 26, 2023 – present
Minister of National Revenue	Diane Lebouthillier	November 4, 2015 – July 26, 2023
Minister of National Revenue	Marie-Claude Bibeau	July 26, 2023 – December 20, 2024
Minister of National Revenue	Élisabeth Brière	December 20, 2024 – present
Minister of Northern Affairs	Dan Vandal	November 20, 2019 – December 20, 2024
Minister of Official Languages	Ginette Petitpas Taylor	October 26, 2021 – July 26, 2023
Minister of Official Languages	Rachel Bendayan	December 20, 2024 – March 14, 2025
Minister responsible for the Pacific Economic Development Agency of Canada	Harjit Sajjan	October 26, 2021 – March 14, 2025
Minister responsible for Prairies Economic Development Canada	Dan Vandal	October 26, 2021 – December 20, 2024
Minister responsible for Prairies Economic Development Canada	Terry Duguid	December 20, 2024 – March 14, 2025
Minister of Public Safety and Emergency Preparedness	Ralph Goodale	November 4, 2015 – November 20, 2019
Minister of Public Safety and Emergency Preparedness	Bill Blair	November 20, 2019 – October 26, 2021
Minister of Public Safety	Marco Mendicino	October 26, 2021 – July 26, 2023
Minister of Public Safety, Democratic Institutions and Intergovernmental Affairs	Dominic LeBlanc	July 26, 2023 – December 20, 2024
Minister of Public Safety	David McGuinty	December 20, 2024 – present
Minister of Public Services and Procurement (Note: Title of office was "Minister of Public Services and Procurement and Accessibility" from July 18, 2018 to November 20, 2019.)	Judy Foote	November 4, 2015 – August 24, 2017
Minister of Public Services and Procurement	Jim Carr (acting)	August 24, 2017 – August 28, 2017
Minister of Public Services and Procurement	Carla Qualtrough	August 28, 2017 – November 20, 2019
Minister of Public Services and Procurement	Anita Anand	November 20, 2019 – October 26, 2021
Minister of Public Services and Procurement	Filomena Tassi	October 26, 2021 – August 31, 2022
Minister of Public Services and Procurement	Helena Jaczek	August 31, 2022 – July 26, 2023
Minister of Public Services and Procurement	Jean-Yves Duclos	July 26, 2023 – March 14, 2025
Minister of Rural Economic Development	Bernadette Jordan	January 14, 2019 – November 20, 2019
Minister of Rural Economic Development	Maryam Monsef	November 20, 2019 – October 26, 2021
Minister of Rural Economic Development	Gudie Hutchings	October 26, 2021 – March 14, 2025
Minister of Science	Kirsty Duncan	November 4, 2015 – July 18, 2018
Minister of Science and Sport	Kirsty Duncan	July 18, 2018 – November 20, 2019
Minister of Seniors	Filomena Tassi	July 18, 2018 – November 20, 2019
Minister of Seniors	Deb Schulte	November 20, 2019 – October 26, 2021
Minister of Seniors	Kamal Khera	October 26, 2021 – July 26, 2023
Minister of Seniors	Seamus O'Regan	July 26, 2023 – July 19, 2024
Minister of Seniors	Steven MacKinnon	July 19, 2024 – December 20, 2024
Minister of Seniors	Joanne Thompson	December 20, 2024 – March 14, 2025
Minister of Small Business and Tourism	Bardish Chagger	November 4, 2015 – July 18, 2018
Minister of Small Business and Export Promotion	Mary Ng	July 18, 2018 – November 20, 2019
Minister of Small Business	Rechie Valdez	July 26, 2023 – March 14, 2025
Minister of Sport and Persons with Disabilities	Carla Qualtrough	November 4, 2015 – August 28, 2017
Minister of Sport and Persons with Disabilities	Kent Hehr	August 28, 2017 – January 25, 2018
Minister of Sport and Persons with Disabilities	Kirsty Duncan	January 25, 2018 – November 20, 2019
Minister of Sport	Pascale St-Onge	October 26, 2021 – July 26, 2023
Minister of Sport and Physical Activity	Carla Qualtrough	July 26, 2023 – December 20, 2024
Minister of Sport	Terry Duguid	December 20, 2024 – March 14, 2025
Minister of Status of Women	Patty Hajdu	November 4, 2015 – February 1, 2017
Minister of Status of Women	Maryam Monsef	February 1, 2017 – December 13, 2018
Minister of Tourism, Official Languages and La Francophonie	Mélanie Joly	July 18, 2018 – November 20, 2019
Minister of Tourism	Randy Boissonnault	October 26, 2021 – July 26, 2023
Minister of Tourism	Soraya Martinez Ferrada	July 26, 2023 – February 6, 2025
Minister of Tourism	Pascale St-Onge	February 6, 2025 – March 14, 2025
Minister of Transport	Marc Garneau	November 4, 2015 – January 12, 2021
Minister of Transport	Omar Alghabra	January 12, 2021 – July 26, 2023
Minister of Transport	Pablo Rodriguez	July 26, 2023 – September 19, 2024
Minister of Transport	Anita Anand	September 19, 2024 – December 20, 2024
Minister of Transport and Internal Trade	Anita Anand	December 20, 2024 – March 14, 2025
Minister of Veterans Affairs	Kent Hehr	November 4, 2015 – August 28, 2017
Minister of Veterans Affairs	Seamus O'Regan	August 28, 2017 – January 14, 2019
Minister of Veterans Affairs	Jody Wilson-Raybould	January 14, 2019 – February 12, 2019
Minister of Veterans Affairs	Harjit Sajjan (acting)	February 12, 2019 – March 1, 2019
Minister of Veterans Affairs	Lawrence MacAulay	March 1, 2019 – July 26, 2023
Minister of Veterans Affairs	Ginette Petitpas Taylor	July 26, 2023 – December 20, 2024
Minister of Veterans Affairs	Darren Fisher	December 20, 2024 – March 14, 2025
Minister without Portfolio	Jim Carr	January 12, 2021 – December 12, 2022
Minister for Women and Gender Equality	Maryam Monsef	December 13, 2018 – October 26, 2021
Minister for Women and Gender Equality and Youth	Marci Ien	October 26, 2021 – March 14, 2025
President of the Treasury Board	Scott Brison	November 4, 2015 – January 14, 2019
President of the Treasury Board	Jane Philpott	January 14, 2019 – March 4, 2019
President of the Treasury Board	Carla Qualtrough (acting)	March 4, 2019 – March 18, 2019
President of the Treasury Board	Joyce Murray	March 18, 2019 – November 20, 2019
President of the Treasury Board	Jean-Yves Duclos	November 20, 2019 – October 26, 2021
President of the Treasury Board	Mona Fortier	October 26, 2021 – July 26, 2023
President of the Treasury Board	Anita Anand	July 26, 2023 – December 20, 2024
President of the Treasury Board	Ginette Petitpas Taylor	December 20, 2024 – present

== Renamed, eliminated, and new ministries ==
Name at the end of the Twenty-Eighth Ministry	Name in the Twenty-Ninth Ministry
Prime Minister
Minister of Aboriginal Affairs and Northern Development; Minister for the Arctic Council	Minister of Crown-Indigenous Relations and Northern Affairs; Minister of Indigenous Services
Minister of Foreign Affairs; Minister of State (Foreign Affairs and Consular)	Minister of Foreign Affairs
Minister of Justice and Attorney General of Canada
Minister of Health
Minister of Public Works and Government Services	Minister of Public Services and Procurement
President of the Treasury Board
Leader of the Government in the House of Commons
Minister of National Defence
Minister of Agriculture and Agri-Food; Minister of State (Small Business and Tourism, and Agriculture)	Minister of Agriculture and Agri-Food; Minister of Small Business and Tourism
Minister of International Development; Minister for La Francophonie	Minister of International Development and La Francophonie
Minister of Industry; Minister of the Canadian Northern Economic Development Agency; Minister of the Economic Development Agency of Canada for the Regions of Quebec; Minister for the Federal Economic Development Initiative for Northern Ontario; Minister of State (Atlantic Canada Opportunities Agency); Minister of State (Federal Economic Development Agency for Southern Ontario); Minister of State (Western Economic Diversification)	Minister of Innovation, Science, and Economic Development
Minister of Infrastructure, Communities, and Intergovernmental Affairs	Minister of Infrastructure and Communities; Minister of Intergovernmental Affairs and Youth
Minister of the Environment	Minister of Environment and Climate Change
Minister of Transport
Minister of Fisheries and Oceans	Minister of Fisheries, Oceans, and the Canadian Coast Guard
Associate Minister of National Defence
Minister of Public Safety and Emergency Preparedness
Minister of International Trade
Minister of Finance; Minister of State (Finance)	Minister of Finance
Minister of National Revenue
Minister of Employment and Social Development; Minister of Labour; Minister of State (Social Development)	Minister of Employment, Workforce Development, and Labour; Minister of Families, Children, and Social Development
Minister for Democratic Reform; President of the Queen's Privy Council for Canada	Minister of Democratic Institutions
Minister of Canadian Heritage and Official Languages; Minister for Multiculturalism; Minister of State (Multiculturalism)	Minister of Canadian Heritage
Minister of Citizenship and Immigration	Minister of Immigration, Refugees and Citizenship
Minister responsible for Status of Women	Minister of Status of Women
Minister of Natural Resources
Minister of Veterans Affairs
Minister of State (Seniors)	Minister of Families, Children, and Social Development
Minister of State (Sport)	Minister of Sport and Persons with Disabilities
Minister of State (Science and Technology)	Minister of Science

== Cabinet shuffles ==
=== 2018 shuffle ===
On 18 July 2018, Prime Minister of Canada Justin Trudeau carried out a significant shuffle of his ministry. This included the adding of 5 new ministry positions, expanding the previous size of cabinet from 30 to 35. The cabinet remained gender balanced.

The appointment of Bill Blair as the new Minister of Border Security and Organized Crime Reduction was praised by Opposition Immigration Critic Michelle Rempel, in response to an increase of illegal crossings of the Canada–United States border. The Deputy Leader of the Opposition Lisa Raitt called the shuffle a "desperate attempt to hit the reset button before the next election".

The shuffle was labeled by CBC News as Trudeau's re-election kickoff for the 2019 federal election.

Colour key
- Joined the Cabinet
- Left the Cabinet

Minister	Position before shuffle	Result of shuffle
Mary Ng	Backbench MP	Became Minister of Small Business and Export Promotion
Filomena Tassi	Deputy Government Whip	Became Minister of Seniors
Jonathan Wilkinson	Parliamentary Secretary to the Minister of Environment and Climate Change	Became Minister of Fisheries, Oceans, and the Canadian Coast Guard
Pablo Rodríguez	Chief Government Whip	Became Minister of Canadian Heritage
Dominic LeBlanc	Minister of Fisheries, Oceans, and the Canadian Coast Guard	Became Minister of Intergovernmental Affairs and Minister of Northern Affairs and Internal Trade
Amarjeet Sohi	Minister of Infrastructure and Communities	Became Minister of Natural Resources
Carla Qualtrough	Minister of Public Services and Procurement	Given additional role as Minister of Accessibility
Jim Carr	Minister of Natural Resources	Became Minister of International Trade Diversification
Mélanie Joly	Minister of Canadian Heritage	Became Minister of Tourism, Official Languages and La Francophonie
François-Philippe Champagne	Minister of International Trade	Became Minister of Infrastructure and Communities
Scott Brison	President of the Treasury Board	Given additional role as the new Minister of Digital Government
Carolyn Bennett	Minister of Crown-Indigenous Relations and Northern Affairs	Minister of Crown–Indigenous Relations
Bardish Chagger	Leader of the Government in the House of Commons and Minister of Small Business and Tourism	Leader of the Government in the House of Commons
Bill Blair	Parliamentary Secretary to the Minister of Justice	Became the new Minister of Border Security and Organized Crime Reduction

=== 2021 shuffle ===
On 12 January 2021, Trudeau carried out a shuffle of his ministry. It came shortly after Innovation minister Navdeep Bains announced he intended to stand down from the government and not seek re-election at the 2021 Canadian federal election. The shuffle spurred speculation of a snap election.

Minister	Position before shuffle	Result of shuffle
Navdeep Bains	Minister of Innovation, Science and Industry and Registrar General of Canada	Left the government (intention to stand down announced in January 2021)
François-Philippe Champagne	Minister of Foreign Affairs	Became Minister of Innovation, Science and Industry and Registrar General of Canada
Marc Garneau	Minister of Transport	Became Minister of Foreign Affairs
Omar Alghabra	Parliament Secretary to the Deputy Prime Minister and Minister of Intergovernmental Affairs	Became Minister of Transport
Jim Carr	Special Representative for the Prairies	Given additional role as Minister without Portfolio

=== 2023 shuffle ===
After a difficult parliamentary term, Trudeau announced the third major re-shuffle of his ministry and the first re-shuffle since the 2021 election, with the exception of ministers Tassi and Jaczek swapping roles in 2022.

Minister	Position before shuffle	Result of shuffle
Gary Anandasangaree	Parliamentary Secretary to the Minister of Justice and Attorney General of Canada	Minister of Crown-Indigenous Relations
Terry Beech	Parliament Secretary to the Deputy Prime Minister and Minister of Intergovernmental Affairs	Minister of Citizens' Services
Soraya Martinez Ferrada	Parliamentary Secretary to the Minister of Housing and Diversity and Inclusion (Housing)	Minister of Tourism and Minister responsible for the Economic Development Agency of Canada for the Regions of Quebec
Ya'ara Saks	Parliamentary Secretary to the Minister of Families, Children and Social Development	Minister of Mental Health and Addictions and Associate Minister of Health
Jenna Sudds	Parliamentary Secretary to the Minister for Women and Gender Equality and Youth	Minister of Families, Children and Social Development
Rechie Valdez	Backbench MP	Minister of Small Business
Arif Virani	Parliamentary Secretary to the Minister of International Trade, Export Promotion, Small Business and Economic Development	Minister of Justice and Attorney General of Canada
Anita Anand	Minister of National Defence	President of the Treasury Board
Marie-Claude Bibeau	Minister of Agriculture and Agri-Food	Minister of National Revenue
Bill Blair	President of the King's Privy Council for Canada and Minister of Emergency Preparedness	Minister of National Defence
Randy Boissonnault	Minister of Tourism and Associate Minister of Finance	Minister of Employment, Workforce Development and Official Languages
Jean-Yves Duclos	Minister of Health	Minister of Public Services and Procurement
Sean Fraser	Minister of Immigration, Refugees and Citizenship	Minister of Housing, Infrastructure and Communities
Karina Gould	Minister of Families, Children and Social Development	Leader of the Government in the House of Commons
Mark Holland	Leader of the Government in the House of Commons	Minister of Health
Ahmed Hussen	Minister of Housing and Diversity and Inclusion	Minister of International Development
Gudie Hutchings	Minister of Rural Economic Development	Minister of Rural Economic Development and Minister responsible for the Atlantic Canada Opportunities Agency
Mary Ng	Minister of International Trade, Export Promotion, Small Business and Economic Development	Minister of Export Promotion, International Trade and Economic Development
Seamus O'Regan Jr.	Minister of Labour	Minister of Labour and Seniors
Ginette Petitpas Taylor	Minister of Official Languages and Minister responsible for the Atlantic Canada Opportunities Agency	Minister of Veterans Affairs and Associate Minister of National Defence
Carla Qualtrough	Minister of Employment, Workforce Development and Disability Inclusion	Minister of Sport and Physical Activity
Pablo Rodriguez	Minister of Canadian Heritage and Quebec Lieutenant	Minister of Transport and Quebec Lieutenant
Harjit S. Sajjan	Minister of International Development and Minister responsible for the Pacific Economic Development Agency of Canada	President of the King's Privy Council for Canada and Minister of Emergency Preparedness and Minister responsible for the Pacific Economic Development Agency of Canada
Pascale St-Onge	Minister of Sport and Minister responsible for the Economic Development Agency of Canada for the Regions of Quebec	Minister of Canadian Heritage
Jonathan Wilkinson	Minister of Natural Resources	Minister of Energy and Natural Resources
Omar Alghabra	Minister of Transport	Decided to not seek re-election
Carolyn Bennett	Minister of Mental Health and Addictions and Associate Minister of Health	Decided to not seek re-election
Mona Fortier	President of the Treasury Board	Removed from cabinet
Helena Jaczek	Minister of Public Services and Procurement	Decided to not seek re-election
David Lametti	Minister of Justice and Attorney General of Canada	Removed from cabinet
Marco Mendicino	Minister of Public Safety	Removed from cabinet
Joyce Murray	Minister of Fisheries, Oceans and the Canadian Coast Guard	Decided to not seek re-election

=== 2024 shuffle and crisis ===
The closing months of 2024 saw a wave of resignations in Trudeau's cabinet. On September 19, 2024, Minister of Transport Pablo Rodriguez resigned to run for leadership of the Quebec Liberal Party. On November 20, 2024, Alberta MP Randy Boissonnault resigned following allegations that he ran a business seeking federal contracts and falsely claimed to be Indigenous. On December 15, 2024, Housing Minister Sean Fraser announced his intention to leave the federal cabinet during the next shuffle, citing personal reasons.

On December 16, 2024, Chrystia Freeland resigned as Deputy Prime Minister and Minister of Finance, hours before she was due to release the government's fall economic statement. She was replaced by Dominic LeBlanc, who would temporarily retain his role as Minister of Intergovernmental Affairs, Infrastructure and Communities. Freeland was often nicknamed the "minister of everything", and widely seen as a potential successor to Trudeau for the leadership of the Liberal Party.

In her resignation letter, Freeland reported Trudeau had asked her to resign as finance minister and that she would be offered another Cabinet position. She instead decided to resign altogether from his Cabinet, saying that "to be effective, a Minister must speak on behalf of the Prime Minister and with his full confidence. In making your decision, you made clear that I no longer credibly enjoy that confidence."

Freeland's resignation came amid threats from the incoming Trump administration to impose 25% tariffs upon Canada, as well as Freeland's reported opposition to Trudeau's promise of $250 cheques to working Canadians who earned $150,000 or less in 2023. In her letter, Freeland implicitly referred to this proposal as a "costly political gimmick" and argued that the Canadian government should "[keep] our fiscal powder dry today, so we have the reserves we may need for a coming tariff war."

The resignation raised speculation as to the future of Trudeau's leadership. The economic statement was eventually released at 4:11 PM EST that same day, showing a deficit of $61.9 billion for 2023–24, exceeding Freeland's target of $40.1 billion or less, and left Trump's tariff threats largely unaddressed.

==== Shuffle ====
After a series of resignations and retirements of ministry members, Trudeau announced his fourth major shuffle amid a political crisis. Previously in 2024, there were minor changes in the ministry following the resignations of Randy Boissonnault, Chrystia Freeland, Pablo Rodriguez, and Seamus O'Regan. Boissonnault was succeeded by Ginette Petitpas Taylor, Freeland was succeeded by Dominic LeBlanc in the finance portfolio, Rodriguez was succeeded by Anita Anand, and O'Regan was succeeded by Steven MacKinnon. Fraser resigned four days before the shuffle.

Minister	Position before shuffle	Result of shuffle
Rachel Bendayan	Parliamentary secretary to the Deputy Prime Minister of Canada and to the Minister of Finance	Minister of Official Languages and Associate Minister of Public Safety
Élisabeth Brière	Parliamentary secretary to the Minister of Families, Children and Social Development, to the Minister of Mental Health and Addictions, and to the Associate Minister of Health	Minister of National Revenue
Terry Duguid	Parliamentary Secretary to the Prime Minister of Canada and Special Advisor for Water	Minister of Sport and Minister responsible for Prairies Economic Development Canada
Nate Erskine-Smith	Backbench MP	Minister of Housing, Infrastructure and Communities
Darren Fisher	Backbench MP	Minister of Veterans Affairs and Associate Minister of National Defence
David McGuinty	Backbench MP and Chair of the National Security and Intelligence Committee of Parliamentarians	Minister of Public Safety
Ruby Sahota	Chief Government Whip	Minister of Democratic Institutions and Minister responsible for the Federal Economic Development Agency for Southern Ontario
Joanne Thompson	Backbench MP	Minister of Seniors
Anita Anand	President of the Treasury Board and Minister of Transport	Minister of Transport and Internal Trade
Gary Anandasangaree	Minister of Crown–Indigenous Relations	Minister of Crown–Indigenous Relations, Northern Affairs, and Minister responsible for the Canadian Northern Economic Development Agency
Dominic LeBlanc	Minister of Finance, Democratic Institutions, Public Safety, and Intergovernmental Affairs	Minister of Finance and Intergovernmental Affairs
Steven MacKinnon	Minister of Seniors and Labour	Minister of Labour, Employment, and Workforce Development
Ginette Petitpas Taylor	Minister of Veterans Affairs, Employment, Workforce Development, Official Languages, and Associate Minister of National Defence	President of the Treasury Board
Marie-Claude Bibeau	Minister of National Revenue	Decided to not seek re-election
Randy Boissonnault	Minister of Employment, Workforce Development and Official Languages	Resigned
Sean Fraser	Minister of Housing, Infrastructure and Communities	Decided to not seek re-election
Chrystia Freeland	Deputy Prime Minister and Minister of Finance	Resigned
Seamus O'Regan	Minister of Labour and Seniors	Decided to not seek re-election
Carla Qualtrough	Minister of Sport and Physical Activity	Decided to not seek re-election
Pablo Rodriguez	Minister of Transport	Resigned
Filomena Tassi	Minister responsible for the Federal Economic Development Agency for Southern Ontario	Decided to not seek re-election
Dan Vandal	Minister of Northern Affairs, Minister responsible for Prairies Economic Development Canada, and the Canadian Northern Economic Development Agency	Decided to not seek re-election

== Legacy ==
Retrospective analysis of the Ministry highlights a divided and extensive legacy. The Canadian Press identified cannabis legalization, the Canada Child Benefit, federal carbon pricing, Indigenous reconciliation initiatives, the COVID-19 pandemic response, and the renegotiation of the North American Free Trade Agreement as major pillars of the government's tenure, while noting that electoral reform was a prominent 2015 promise that was not fulfilled. The Guardian described his government's record as a balance of wins for progressivism, particularly regarding gender equality, child care, and immigration, alongside unfulfilled potential on larger economic and social promises.

Reuters noted that while the ministry won praise for its social policies, public support ultimately declined amid rising grocery and housing costs, poor party polling, caucus unrest, and the political crisis following Chrystia Freeland's resignation. The Wall Street Journal similarly reported that the government's standing fell as voters reacted negatively to housing shortages, living costs, immigration targets, and ethical controversies such as the SNC-Lavalin affair. Regarding the ministry's environmental record, CBC News noted the government reduced national emissions and increased energy regulations, but left some key climate policies unfinished upon Trudeau's exit, while The Hill Times characterized the era's climate strategy as a decade of experimental policymaking contrasting it with what it characterized as a more pragmatic approach of Trudeau’s successor, Mark Carney.

== See also ==
- List of prime ministers of Canada
- Historical rankings of prime ministers of Canada
- List of current Parliamentary Secretaries of Canada

== Notes ==
Ministries of Canada
Preceded by 28th Canadian Ministry	29th Canadian Ministry; 2015–2025	Succeeded by 30th Canadian Ministry
