= Minister of Tourism (Canada) =

Federal cabinet position (1980–2025)

Secretary of State (Tourism)
- Incumbent; Rechie Valdez since May 13, 2025
- Innovation, Science and Economic Development Canada
- Style: The Honourable
- Member of: Parliament; Privy Council; Cabinet
- Reports to: Parliament; Prime Minister
- Appointer: Monarch (represented by the governor general) on the advice of the prime minister
- Term length: At His Majesty's pleasure
- Salary: CA$299,900 (2024)
- Website: ic.gc.ca

The minister of tourism (French: ministre du tourisme) is a minister of the Crown member of the Canadian Cabinet. The office is associated with Innovation, Science and Economic Development Canada.

== List of ministers ==
| Minister | Tenure | | Party | Ministry (Prime Minister) |
Minister of State (Small Businesses and Tourism)
| Charles Lapointe | March 3, 1980 | September 29, 1982 | Liberal | 22 (P. E. Trudeau) |
| Bill Rompkey | September 30, 1982 | August 11, 1983 | Liberal | 22 (P. E. Trudeau) |
| David Smith | August 12, 1982 | June 29, 1984 | Liberal | 22 (P. E. Trudeau) |
| David Smith | June 30, 1984 | September 16, 1984 | Liberal | 23 (Turner) |
Minister of State (Tourism)
| Thomas McMillan | September 17, 1984 | August 19, 1985 | Progressive Conservative | 24 (Mulroney) |
| Jack Murta | August 20, 1985 | June 29, 1986 | Progressive Conservative | 24 (Mulroney) |
Minister of State (Small Businesses and Tourism)
| Bernard Valcourt | June 30, 1986 | January 29, 1989 | Progressive Conservative | 24 (Mulroney) |
| Tom Hockin | January 30, 1989 | June 24, 1993 | Progressive Conservative | 24 (Mulroney) |
Secretary of State (Small Business and Tourism)
| Gerry Ritz | January 4, 2007 | August 13, 2007 | Conservative | 28 (Harper) |
| Diane Ablonczy | August 14, 2007 | October 29, 2008 | Conservative | 28 (Harper) |
Minister of State (Small Business and Tourism)
| Diane Ablonczy | October 30, 2008 | January 18, 2010 | Conservative | 28 (Harper) |
| Rob Moore | January 19, 2010 | May 17, 2011 | Conservative | 28 (Harper) |
| Maxime Bernier | May 18, 2011 | July 14, 2013 | Conservative | 28 (Harper) |
Minister of State (Small Business and Tourism, and Agriculture)
| Maxime Bernier | July 15, 2013 | November 3, 2015 | Conservative | 28 (Harper) |
Minister of Small Business and Tourism
| Bardish Chagger | November 4, 2015 | July 18, 2018 | Liberal | 29 (J. Trudeau) |
Minister of Tourism, Official Languages and La Francophonie
| Mélanie Joly | July 18, 2018 | November 20, 2019 | Liberal | 29 (J. Trudeau) |
| vacant | November 20, 2019 | October 26, 2021 | Liberal | 29 (J. Trudeau) |
Minister of Tourism
| Randy Boissonnault | October 26, 2021 | July 26, 2023 | Liberal | 29 (J. Trudeau) |
| Soraya Martinez Ferrada | July 26, 2023 | February 6, 2025 | Liberal | 29 (J. Trudeau) |
| Pascale St-Onge | February 6, 2025 | March 14, 2025 | Liberal | 29 (J. Trudeau) |
| vacant | March 14, 2025 | May 13, 2025 | Liberal | 30 (Carney) |
Secretary of State (Small Businesses and Tourism)
| Rechie Valdez | May 13, 2025 | present | Liberal | 30 (Carney) |
