= Pascale St-Onge =

Canadian politician (born 1977)

The Honourable Pascale St-Onge PC
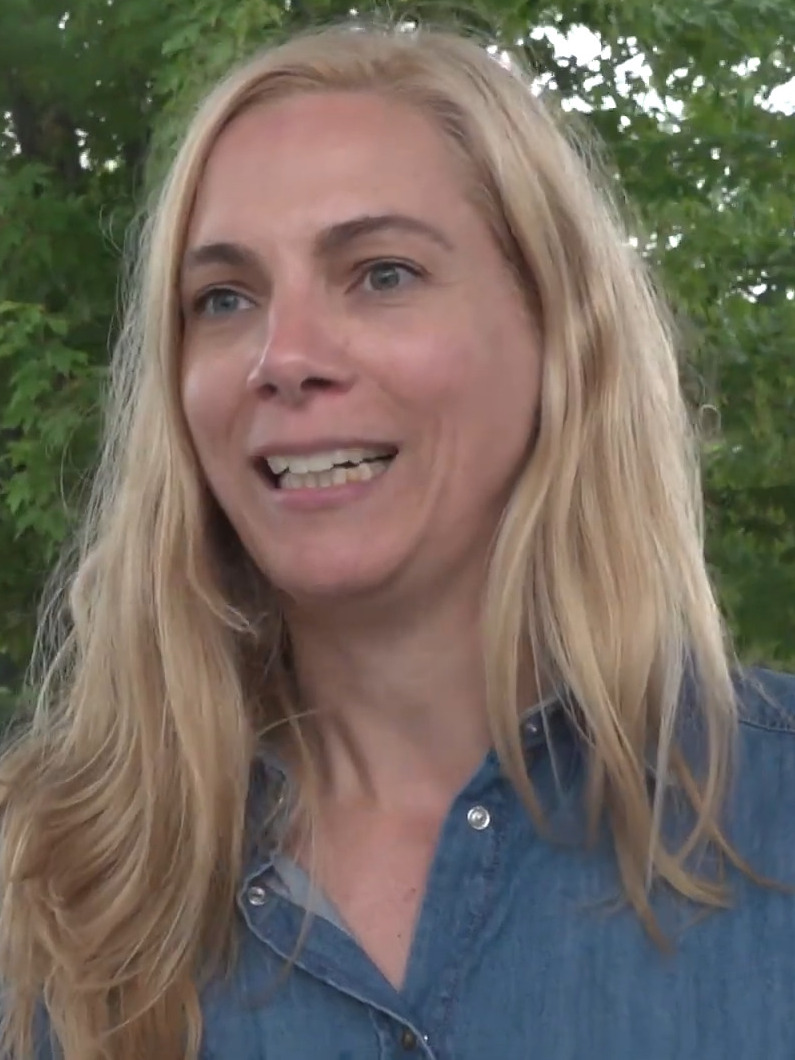
- St-Onge in 2022

Minister of Canadian Heritage
- In office July 26, 2023 – March 14, 2025
- Prime Minister: Justin Trudeau
- Preceded by: Pablo Rodriguez
- Succeeded by: Steven Guilbeault

Minister of Tourism
- In office February 6, 2025 – March 14, 2025
- Prime Minister: Justin Trudeau
- Preceded by: Soraya Martinez Ferrada
- Succeeded by: Rechie Valdez (Note: as Secretary of State (Tourism).)

Minister responsible for the Economic Development Agency of Canada for the Regions of Quebec
- In office February 6, 2025 – March 14, 2025
- Prime Minister: Justin Trudeau
- Preceded by: Soraya Martinez Ferrada
- Succeeded by: Mélanie Joly
- In office October 26, 2021 – July 26, 2023
- Prime Minister: Justin Trudeau
- Preceded by: Mélanie Joly (Note: as Minister of Economic Development and Official Languages.)
- Succeeded by: Soraya Martinez Ferrada

Minister of Sport
- In office October 26, 2021 – July 26, 2023
- Prime Minister: Justin Trudeau
- Preceded by: Steven Guilbeault (Note: as Minister of Canadian Heritage.)
- Succeeded by: Carla Qualtrough

Member of Parliament for Brome—Missisquoi
- In office September 20, 2021 – March 23, 2025
- Preceded by: Lyne Bessette
- Succeeded by: Louis Villeneuve

Personal details
- Born: May 13, 1977 (age 49)
- Party: Liberal
- Education: Université de Montréal; Université du Québec à Montréal
- Occupation: Union leader

Pascale St-Onge PC (French pronunciation: [paskal sɛ̃t‿ɔ̃ʒ] ; born May 13, 1977) is a Canadian politician who represented the riding of Brome—Missisquoi in the House of Commons of Canada from 2021 Canadian federal election until 2025. She served as the Minister of Canadian Heritage from 2023 to 2025 and Minister of Tourism and Minister responsible for the Economic Development Agency of Canada for the Regions of Quebec from February to March 2025. She also held the latter position from 2021 to 2023, when she was also Minister of Sport from 2021 to 2023. Her appointment to cabinet in 2021 made her the first openly lesbian Canadian cabinet minister. In February 2025, St-Onge announced that she would not run in that year's federal election.

Before entering politics, she was president of the Fédération nationale des communications et de la culture, Quebec's largest media union as well as a bassist in an all-lesbian alternative rock band, Mad June.

== Early life and career ==
St-Onge was born on May 13, 1977, and grew up in the Montreal suburb of Saint-Eustache, Quebec. She was a competitive swimmer in her youth and played volleyball in college and university. She graduated from the Université du Québec à Montréal in literary studies. St. Onge also obtained a certificate in journalism from the Université de Montréal, and worked for La Presse in sales after graduation.

In the early 2010s, St. Onge was the bassist, backup vocalist, and manager of an all-lesbian alternative rock quartet from Montreal called Mad June. She learned to play bass after deciding to form the group with her bandmates. She learned using a second-hand bass from her then-girlfriend, the lead vocalist and rhythm guitarist of the band. In 2010, the band played at Montebello Rock; the Boston finale of the Lilith Fair, where they were hugged on-stage by fellow Canadian musician Sarah McLachlan; and were selected to appear at the Canadian Music Week. The band produced three singles before dissolving in 2015.

By the end of 2015, St-Onge was elected president of the Fédération nationale des communications et de la culture (FNCC-CSN), Quebec's largest media and cultural industry association. In that role, she was critical of then-Minister of Canadian Heritage and future cabinet colleague Mélanie Joly for granting an exemption to Netflix from Canadian taxes and called for more government support of media. By the 2019 federal election, St. Onge collaborated with Joly to bring most political parties to support such tax changes, which led to the later Online News Act.

== Political career ==
In the lead up to the September 20, 2021, federal election, Joly, the national campaign co-chair for the Liberal Party, recruited St. Onge, whose term at FNCC was ending. St. Onge won by less than 200 votes in Brome—Missisquoi, a riding in Quebec's Eastern Townships. The count was subject to a judicial recount requested by the Bloc Québécois candidate after St. Onge won three days after election night on the strength of mail-in ballots. After approximately 60 irregularities were resolved without issue, the Bloc then conceded and ended the recount process on October 13, 2021.

=== Minister of Sport ===
Prime Minister Justin Trudeau appointed St. Onge Minister of Sport and Minister responsible for the Economic Development Agency of Canada for the Regions of Quebec in November 2021, making her Canada's first openly lesbian cabinet minister.

On June 12, 2022, St. Onge launched the Office of the Sport Integrity Commissioner (OSIC) as an independent investigative and complaints body for national sports organizations, who were required to sign on by April 2023 or lose federal funding. OSIC received $16 million over three years to fund its launch and operations. St. Onge also called for Canadian national sport organizations to stop using non-disclosure agreements.

The same month, in response to the Hockey Canada sexual assault scandal, St-Onge called for a forensic audit into whether taxpayer funding was used to pay out sexual assault settlements. The following month, St-Onge also paused federal funding to Hockey Canada until it explained its response to the 2018 allegations. After further revelations about sexual assault allegations, she called for Hockey Canada leadership to step down in August 2022.

St. Onge refused to attend the 2022 FIFA World Cup in Qatar, citing the country's poor LGBTQ rights record as well as abuses of migrant workers. On December 12, 2022, St. Onge announced $2.4 million in mental health funding for Canadian athletes.

In February 2023, St. Onge organized a ministerial conference with provincial counterparts on the safe sport crisis in Charlottetown, P.E.I. during the Canada Games and urged provinces to either join OSIC or set up their own analogous organizations. In May 2023 she announced reforms to address the safe sport crisis in Canada, which included the Hockey Canada sexual assault scandal.

=== Minister of Canadian Heritage ===
St. Onge was appointed Minister of Canadian Heritage in July 2023. In this role, she was in charge of implementing the rollout of the Online News Act, which required large internet corporations to pay Canadian news outlets for posts using their coverage. Corporations such as Meta Platforms and Google had threatened to block access to news on their platforms to avoid regulation. Google would subsequently sign a deal with the government paying news outlets $100 million per year to avoid regulation under the Online News Act.

In February 2024, St. Onge criticized Bell Media for a round of layoffs in local journalism positions and selling 45 of its 113 regional radio stations despite the end of certain licensing fees meant that it would gain $40 million in regulatory relief per year.

In March 2024, St. Onge announced that the Local Journalism Initiative would be expended until 2027 with a cost of $58.8 million. At the Juno Awards later that month, St. Onge announced a $32 million increase over two years to the Canada Music Fund, which awards grants via FACTOR and Musicaction for English and French artists respectively. The amount was short of the $60 million that various industry associations had requested.

In May 2024, St. Onge set up an expert commission to provide recommendations on how to modernize the Canadian Broadcasting Corporation (CBC). In October 2024, St. Onge named Marie-Philippe Bouchard as the new CEO of the CBC, succeeding Catherine Tait. On February 20, 2025, St. Onge released a revised mandate roadmap for the CBC, including banning advertisements during news programs and subscription fees for digital services; bringing funding levels up from being only being ahead of the United States to be more comparable to average G7 public broadcaster levels, which is about double the current funding levels at $33 per year per capita; and enshrining impartiality in the CBC's mandate.

Also in February 2025, upon the resignation of Soraya Martinez Ferrada to run for municipal office, St. Onge took on her roles as Minister of Tourism and Minister responsible for the Economic Development Agency of Canada for the Regions of Quebec. She also announced that she would not run in the 2025 federal election to spend time with her newborn child.

== Personal life ==
St. Onge is a lesbian and married her wife in summer 2005 after Prime Minister Paul Martin's government legalized same-sex marriage in Canada via the Civil Marriage Act. In November 2024, St. Onge took parental leave as her wife gave birth and continued to work and vote remotely. She has lived in Orford, Quebec since 2018.

== Electoral record ==
2021 Canadian federal election: Brome—Missisquoi
Party	Candidate	Votes	%	±%	Expenditures
Liberal	Pascale St-Onge	21,488	34.96	-3.2	$39,303.15
Bloc Québécois	Marilou Alarie	21,291	34.64	+0.2	$33,184.64
Conservative	Vincent Duhamel	9,961	16.20	+3.7	$94,614.82
New Democratic	Andrew Panton	3,828	6.23	-1.8	$0.45
People's	Alexis Stogowski	1,982	3.22	+2.5	$0.00
Green	Michelle Corcos	1,466	2.38	-3.0	$0.00
Free	Maryse Richard	961	1.56	N/A	$914.14
Veterans Coalition	Lawrence Cotton	215	0.35	+0.1	$0.00
Independent	Dany Desjardins	145	0.24	N/A	$0.00
Christian Heritage	Susanne Lefebvre	133	0.22	N/A	$2.403.25
Total valid votes/expense limit		61,471	98.22	–	$112,117.88
Total rejected ballots		1,115	1.78		
Turnout		62,586	66.07		
Registered voters		94,728			
Liberal hold		Swing		-1.5	
Source: Elections Canada
