= Minister of Science and Sport =

The Minister of Science and Sport was a position in the Canadian government occupied by Kirsty Duncan from July 19, 2018, to November 21, 2019.

The position was created as a result of a merge between the Minister for Sport and the Minister for Science

After November 21, 2019, the responsibilities for this position were redistributed between the Minister of Innovation, Science and Industry and the Minister of Canadian Heritage (sports)
