= Carla Qualtrough =

Canadian politician and former Paralympic swimmer

The Honourable Carla Qualtrough PC
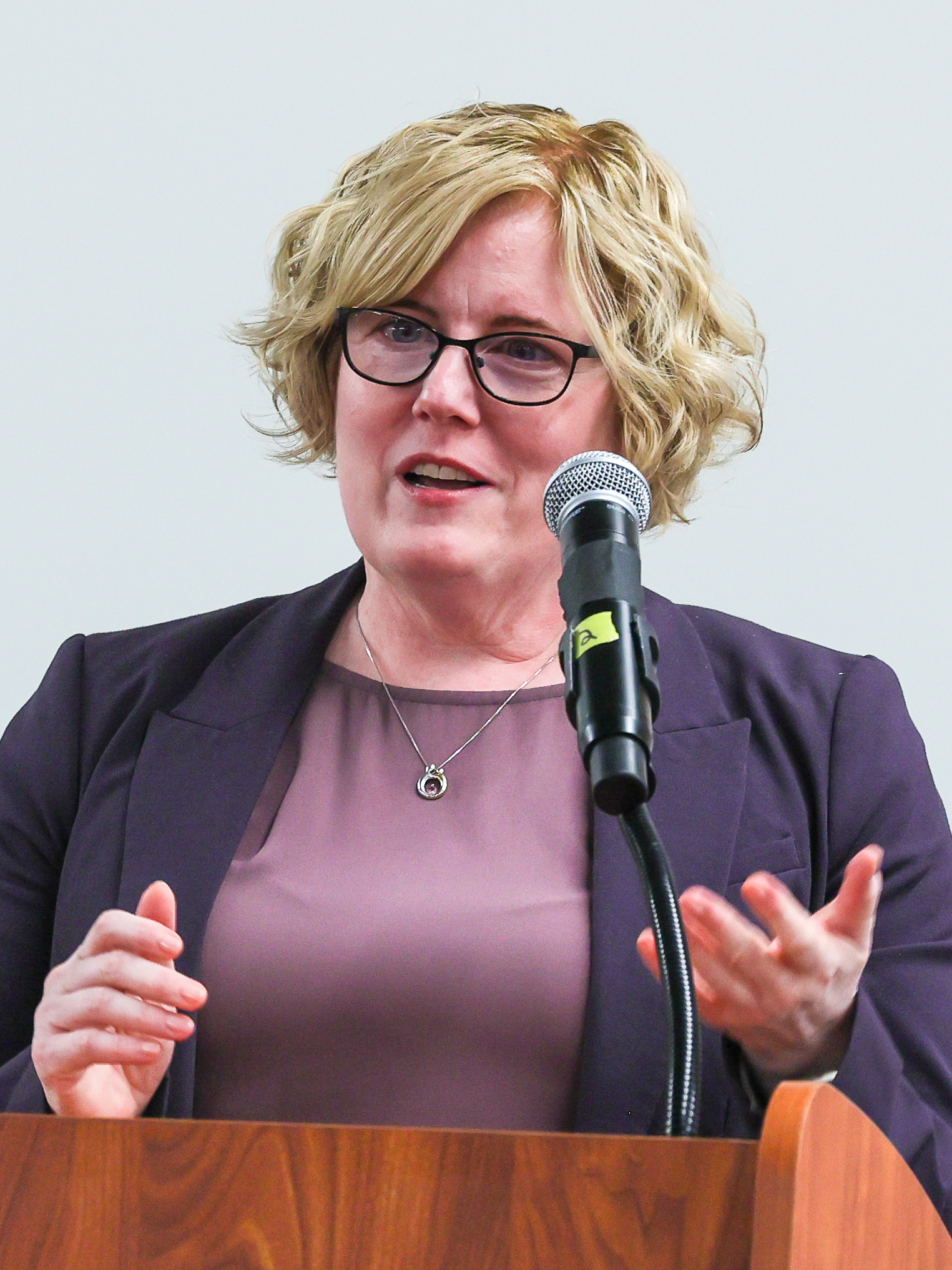
- Qualtrough in 2023

Minister of Sport and Physical Activity
- In office July 26, 2023 – December 20, 2024
- Prime Minister: Justin Trudeau
- Preceded by: Pascale St-Onge
- Succeeded by: Terry Duguid

Minister of Employment, Workforce Development and Disability Inclusion
- In office November 20, 2019 – July 26, 2023
- Prime Minister: Justin Trudeau
- Preceded by: Patty Hajdu
- Succeeded by: Randy Boissonnault (Employment and Workforce Development); Kamal Khera (Persons with Disabilities)

President of the Treasury Board (Acting)
- In office March 5, 2019 – March 18, 2019
- Prime Minister: Justin Trudeau
- Preceded by: Jane Philpott
- Succeeded by: Joyce Murray

Minister of Accessibility
- In office July 18, 2018 – November 20, 2019
- Prime Minister: Justin Trudeau
- Preceded by: Kirsty Duncan
- Succeeded by: Carla Qualtrough (as Minister of Disability Inclusion)

Minister of Public Services and Procurement Receiver General for Canada
- In office August 28, 2017 – November 20, 2019
- Prime Minister: Justin Trudeau
- Preceded by: Judy Foote
- Succeeded by: Anita Anand

Minister of Sport and Persons with Disabilities
- In office November 4, 2015 – August 28, 2017
- Prime Minister: Justin Trudeau
- Preceded by: Bal Gosal
- Succeeded by: Kent Hehr

Member of Parliament for Delta
- In office October 19, 2015 – March 23, 2025
- Preceded by: Riding established
- Succeeded by: Jill McKnight

Personal details
- Born: Carla Dawn Qualtrough; October 15, 1971 (age 55) Calgary, Alberta, Canada
- Party: Liberal
- Spouse: Eron Main
- Education: University of Ottawa; University of Victoria
- Profession: Lawyer, politician
- Sports career
Medal record
Para swimming
Representing Canada
Paralympic Games
Bronze medal – third place	1988 Seoul	4×100 m medlay relay B1–3
Bronze medal – third place	1992 Barcelona	4×100 m medley relay B1–3
Bronze medal – third place	1992 Barcelona	4×100 m freestyle relay B1–3

Carla Dawn Qualtrough PC (/ˈkwɒltroʊ/; born October 15, 1971) is a Canadian politician and former Paralympic swimmer who served as the Minister of Sport and Physical Activity from July 2023 to December 2024. A member of the Liberal Party, Qualtrough represented the riding of Delta in the House of Commons from 2015 to 2025.

She previously served as the Minister of Employment, Workforce Development and Disability Inclusion from 2019 to 2023, the Minister of Public Services and Procurement and Accessibility from 2017 to 2019, and the Minister of Sport and Persons with Disabilities from 2015 to 2017. Qualtrough was also the Receiver General for Canada from 2017 to 2019.

== Early life and education ==
Qualtrough was born in Calgary, Alberta, on October 15, 1971, to parents Patricia and Harry Qualtrough, and was raised in Langley, British Columbia. Qualtrough has been visually impaired since birth and only sees 10 percent with her glasses on. She graduated from Brookswood Secondary School and studied political science at the University of Ottawa before earning a law degree from the University of Victoria in 1997. Her parents separated when she was a teenager and her father died in 2007.

=== Paralympic career ===
Qualtrough's visual impairment qualified her to compete in the Paralympic Games. She earned three bronze medals in swimming at the 1988 and 1992 Summer Paralympics, as well as four world championship medals for Team Canada. During the Paralympics, she swam in the 4x100 medley relay and 4x100 freestyle relay.

== Legal career ==
After earning her law degree, Qualtrough served on the governing board of the Americas Paralympic Committee. She also served as president of the Canadian Paralympic Committee from 2006 to 2011. During this time, she also directed Sport Initiatives for 2010 Legacies Now and Chaired the Sport Dispute Resolution Centre of Canada, leading to her election as one of Canada's Most Influential Women in Sport of 2009.

As a lawyer, Qualtrough primarily focused on human rights matters. She served as counsel to the British Columbia Human Rights Tribunal and the Canadian Human Rights Commission, and prior to her election to the House of Commons, she was the vice-chair of British Columbia's Workers' Compensation Appeal Tribunal. In recognition of her work, she was a recipient of the Queen Elizabeth II Diamond Jubilee Medal in 2012. During the 2012 Summer Paralympics, she was the International Paralympic Committee's (IPC) legal officer and later received the IPCs International Women's Day Recognition in 2016. In 2021, Qualtrough became part of the Canadian Disability Hall of Fame.

== Political career ==
Qualtrough was first elected as Member of Parliament for Delta on October 19, 2015. She was the first Paralympic athlete to be elected to Canada's Parliament. On November 4, 2015, she was named minister of sport and persons with disabilities in the 29th Canadian Ministry, headed by Justin Trudeau. During her tenure, Qualtrough was inducted into the Canadian Paralympic Committee's Canadian Paralympic Hall of Fame in 2017.

In a cabinet shuffle triggered by the resignation of Judy Foote, Qualtrough succeeded Foote as minister of public services and procurement on August 28, 2017; Kent Hehr then took over as minister of sport and persons with disabilities. After the cabinet shuffle on July 18, 2018, Qualtrough retained her ministerial position but gained the added portfolio of accessibility, styled as "minister of public services and procurement and accessibility".

After Jane Philpott's resignation from cabinet on March 5, 2019, Qualtrough was appointed Acting President of the Treasury Board, filling the role until the appointment of Joyce Murray on March 18. The November 20, 2019, cabinet shuffle had Qualtrough become minister of employment, workforce development and disability inclusion, building on her work in the accessibility portfolio.

Qualtrough returned to the sport portfolio in the July 26, 2023, cabinet shuffle, replacing Pascale St-Onge as minister of sport and physical activity.

On October 17, 2024, she announced her retirement at the 2025 Canadian federal election. She left Cabinet in the December 20, 2024, cabinet shuffle. She stood down at the 2025 Canadian federal election and was succeeded by fellow Liberal candidate Jill McKnight.

== Personal life ==
Qualtrough is married to the former secretary-general of the International Wheelchair Rugby Federation, Eron Main, and they have four children together.

== Electoral record ==
2021 Canadian federal election: Delta
Party	Candidate	Votes	%	±%	Expenditures
Liberal	Carla Qualtrough	22,105	42.26	+1.03	$106,067.60
Conservative	Garry Shearer	17,695	33.83	+0.84	$83,639.99
New Democratic	Monika Dean	9,591	18.34	+2.05	$3,705.19
People's	Paul Tarasenko	1,291	2.47	+0.71	none listed
Green	Jeremy Smith	1,244	2.38	–3.90	none listed
Independent	Hong Yan Pan	379	0.72	–	none listed
Total valid votes/expense limit		52,305	99.43	–	$109,817.32
Total rejected ballots		300	0.57	–0.09	
Turnout		52,605	67.20	–3.17	
Eligible voters		78,282			
Liberal hold		Swing		+0.10	
Source: Elections Canada

2019 Canadian federal election: Delta
Party	Candidate	Votes	%	±%	Expenditures
Liberal	Carla Qualtrough	22,257	41.23	–7.89	$95,292.23
Conservative	Tanya Corbet	17,809	32.99	+0.21	$90,938.20
New Democratic	Randy Anderson-Fennell	8,792	16.29	+1.36	$5,648.26
Green	Craig DeCraene	3,387	6.28	+3.10	none listed
People's	Angelina Ireland	948	1.76	–	$6,975.27
Independent	Amarit Bains	398	0.74	–	$9,774.91
Independent	Tony Bennett	385	0.71	–	none listed
Total valid votes/expense limit		53,976	99.34	–	$106,180.72
Total rejected ballots		361	0.66	+0.31	
Turnout		54,337	70.37	–4.10	
Eligible voters		77,216			
Liberal hold		Swing		–4.05	
Source: Elections Canada

2015 Canadian federal election: Delta
Party	Candidate	Votes	%	±%	Expenditures
Liberal	Carla Qualtrough	27,355	49.12	+30.55	$72,634.16
Conservative	Kerry-Lynne Findlay	18,255	32.78	–15.17	$174,408.46
New Democratic	Jeremy Leveque	8,311	14.92	–13.13	$59,352.24
Green	Anthony Edward Devellano	1,768	3.17	–1.57	none listed
Total valid votes/expense limit		55,689	100.00		$206,935.20
Total rejected ballots		200	0.36	–	
Turnout		55,889	74.47	–	
Eligible voters		75,044			
Liberal notional gain from Conservative		Swing		+22.86	
Source: Elections Canada

29th Canadian Ministry (2015–2025) – Cabinet of Justin Trudeau
Cabinet posts (3)
Predecessor	Office	Successor
Patty Hajdu	Minister of Employment, Workforce Development and Disability Inclusion; November 20, 2019 –	Incumbent
Judy Foote	Minister of Public Services, Procurement and Accessibility; August 28, 2017 – November 20, 2019	Anita Anand
Bal Gosal	Minister of Sport and Persons with Disabilities; November 4, 2015 – August 28, 2017	Kent Hehr
