= Soraya Martinez Ferrada =

Canadian politician (born 1972)

Her Worship the Honourable Soraya Martínez Ferrada PC
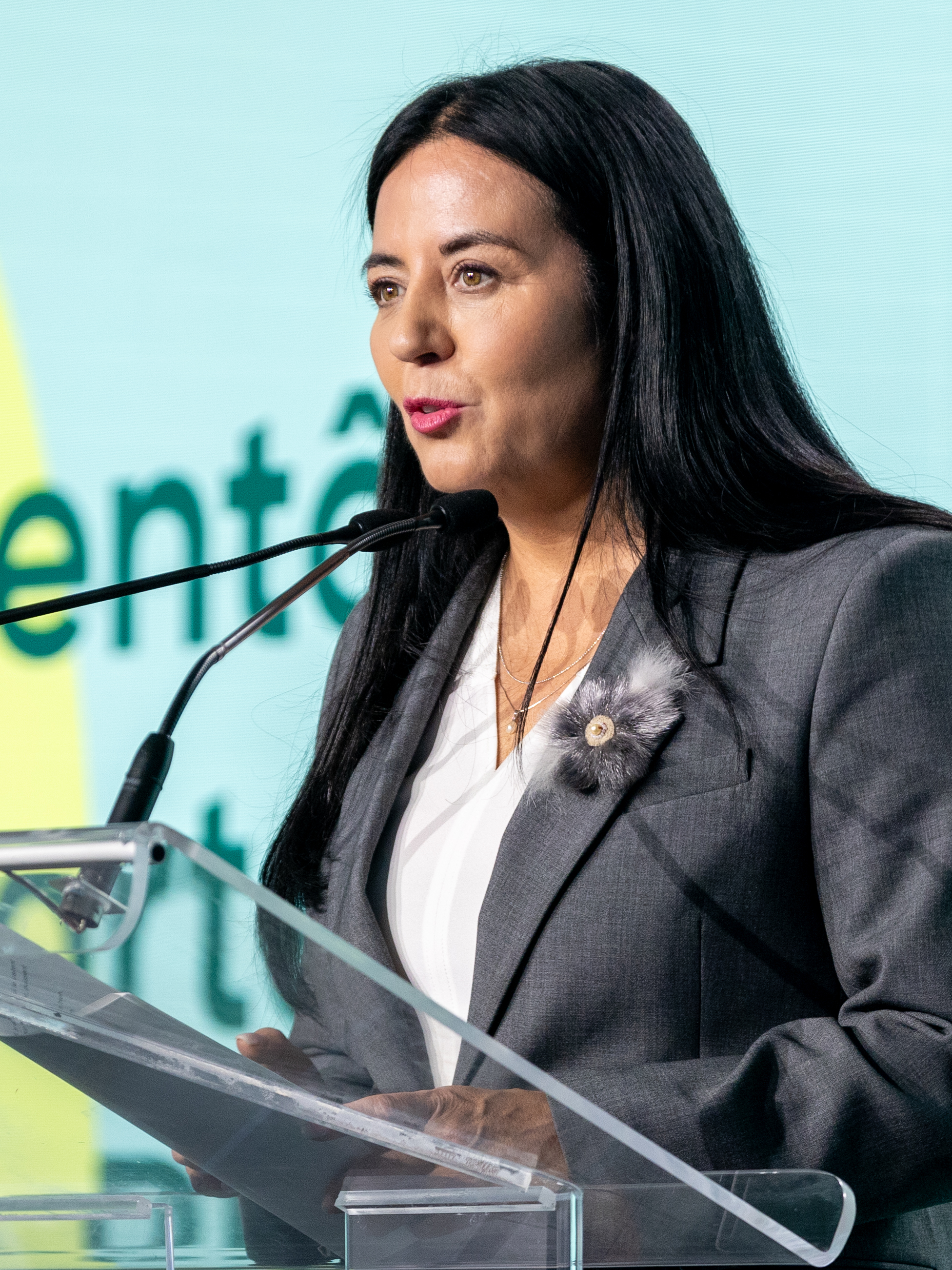
- Martínez Ferrada in 2025

46th Mayor of Montreal
- Incumbent
- Assumed office November 13, 2025
- Preceded by: Valérie Plante

Leader of Ensemble Montréal
- Incumbent
- Assumed office February 28, 2025
- Preceded by: Aref Salem

Minister of Tourism
- In office July 26, 2023 – February 5, 2025
- Prime Minister: Justin Trudeau
- Preceded by: Randy Boissonnault
- Succeeded by: Pascale St-Onge

Minister responsible for the Economic Development Agency of Canada for the Regions of Quebec
- In office July 26, 2023 – February 5, 2025
- Prime Minister: Justin Trudeau
- Preceded by: Pascale St-Onge
- Succeeded by: Pascale St-Onge

Member of Parliament for Hochelaga
- In office October 21, 2019 – March 23, 2025
- Preceded by: Marjolaine Boutin-Sweet
- Succeeded by: Marie-Gabrielle Ménard

Montreal City Councillor
- In office November 6, 2005 – November 2, 2009
- Preceded by: Paolo Tamburello
- Succeeded by: Frantz Benjamin
- Constituency: Saint-Michel

Personal details
- Born: Soraya Marisel Martínez Ferrada; August 28, 1972 (age 54) Santiago, Chile
- Party: Liberal (federal); Ensemble Montréal (municipal)
- Other political affiliations: Coalition Montréal (2013); Vision Montréal (2007–2013); Union Montréal (until 2007)
- Spouse: Pascal Delinois
- Education: HEC Montréal (MM)

Soraya Marisel Martínez Ferrada (born August 28, 1972) is a Canadian politician who has served as the mayor of Montreal and leader of Ensemble Montréal since 2025. A member of the Liberal Party, she previously served as the member of Parliament for Hochelaga from 2019 to 2025, and as a federal Cabinet minister from 2023 to 2025.

== Early life ==
Martínez Ferrada was born on August 28, 1972 in Santiago, Chile, to Omar Martínez Prieto and Maritza Inés Ferrada Videla. Her family moved to Canada in 1980, fleeing the military dictatorship of Augusto Pinochet. Martínez Ferrada lived in the East End of the Montreal Saint-Michel district, as well as Longueuil and Pointe-aux-Trembles. She graduated from HEC Montréal in 2005, with a Master of Management (MM) degree.

== Political career ==
In the 2005 Montreal municipal election, Martínez Ferrada was elected to the city council for the electoral district of Saint-Michel as a member of Union Montréal. In 2007, she joined Vision Montréal, serving until 2009 when she lost to Union Montréal candidate Frantz Benjamin. From 2009 to 2013, Martínez Ferrada worked for Vision Montréal and in the office of Louise Harel. In the 2013 Montreal municipal election, Martínez Ferrada ran to be the borough mayor of Villeray–Saint-Michel–Parc-Extension with Coalition Montréal, placing second to Anie Samson of Équipe Denis Coderre pour Montréal. Prior to her election to the House of Commons, Martínez Ferrada worked as a community Parliament Hill staffer in Mélanie Joly's office.

A member of the Liberal Party, Martínez Ferrada ran as the party's candidate in Hochelaga in the 2019 Canadian federal election. She gained her seat from the New Democratic Party, by a tight margin over the Bloc Québécois. It was the first time the riding had been won by a Liberal since Jean-Claude Malépart had won it in 1988.

Following her election in 2019, Martínez Ferrada was appointed as parliamentary secretary to the minister of immigration, refugees and citizenship, Marco Mendicino.

After being re-elected in the 2021 Canadian federal election, Martínez Ferrada was appointed minister of tourism and minister responsible for the Economic Development Agency of Canada for the Regions of Quebec in 2023.

On February 6, 2025, Martínez Ferrada announced she would stand down at the 2025 Canadian federal election.

=== Mayor of Montreal (2025–present) ===
In February 2025, Martínez Ferrada resigned from the Cabinet and as the Liberal Party national campaign co-chair to seek the leadership of the Ensemble Montréal. She was elected leader by acclamation on February 28, 2025, becoming the party's candidate for mayor in the 2025 Montreal municipal election. In May 2025, she apologized after it was reported that she accepted an illegal security deposit from a tenant renting her family home.

Martínez Ferrada focused her mayoral campaign on housing and affordability, and promised a review of the city's bike lanes. She was endorsed by Équipe Anjou and the city's business community.

Martínez Ferrada was elected mayor on November 2, 2025, defeating Luc Rabouin of Projet Montréal. Her party also won a majority of seats on the Montreal City Council. She is the first Latin American Canadian to serve as the city's mayor.

Martínez Ferrada was sworn in as mayor on November 13, 2025.

== Personal life ==
She is married to Pascal Delinois, and lives in the Saint-Michel neighbourhood of Villeray–Saint-Michel–Parc-Extension in Montreal.

== Electoral record ==
=== Federal ===
2021 Canadian federal election: Hochelaga
Party	Candidate	Votes	%	±%	Expenditures
Liberal	Soraya Martínez Ferrada	18,197	38.14	+4.19	$93,080.02
Bloc Québécois	Simon Marchand	15,089	31.63	-1.71	$47,805.08
New Democratic	Catheryn Roy-Goyette	9,723	20.38	-0.91	$36,496.68
Conservative	Aime Calle Cabrera	2,221	4.66	+0.17	none listed
People's	Marc-André Doucet-Beauchamp	1,081	2.27	+1.56	$0.00
Green	Zachary Lavarenne	965	2.02	-2.92	$0.00
Rhinoceros	Alan Smithee	238	0.50	-0.09	none listed
Communist	Michelle Paquette	108	0.22	+0.03	$0.00
Marxist–Leninist	Christine Dandenault	82	0.17	-0.03	$0.00
Total valid votes/expense limit		47,706	–	–	$110,275.75
Total rejected ballots		867			
Turnout			61.63	-5.17	
Registered voters		78,814			
Liberal hold		Swing		+2.96	
Source: Elections Canada

2019 Canadian federal election: Hochelaga
Party	Candidate	Votes	%	±%	Expenditures
Liberal	Soraya Martínez Ferrada	18,008	33.95	+4.03	$79,299.74
Bloc Québécois	Simon Marchand	17,680	33.34	+5.61	none listed
New Democratic	Catheryn Roy-Goyette	11,451	21.59	-9.30	$44,334.97
Green	Robert D. Morais	2,618	4.94	+1.75	none listed
Conservative	Christine Marcoux	2,381	4.49	-2.36	$4,785.89
People's	Stepan Balatsko	377	0.71	–	none listed
Rhinoceros	Chinook Blais-Leduc	314	0.59	-0.20	none listed
Marxist–Leninist	Christine Dandenault	107	0.20	-0.08	none listed
Communist	JP Fortin	107	0.19	-0.15	$865.68
Total valid votes/expense limit		53,037	98.32		
Total rejected ballots		907	1.68	+0.02	
Turnout		53,944	65.09	+1.56	
Eligible voters		82,881			
Liberal gain from New Democratic		Swing		+6.66	
Source: Elections Canada

=== Municipal ===
2025 Montreal municipal election: Mayor
Party	Candidate	Votes	%	±%
Ensemble Montréal	Soraya Martinez Ferrada	178,618	43.40	
Projet Montréal	Luc Rabouin	144,235	35.05	
Action Montréal	Gilbert Thibodeau	41,818	10.16	+9.13
Transition Montréal	Craig Sauvé	34,787	8.45	
Futur Montréal	Jean-François Kacou	8,723	2.12	
Independent	Fang Hu	1,202	0.29	+0.04
Independent	Jean Duval	1,187	0.29	+0.02
Independent	Katy Le Rougetel	995	0.24	
Total valid votes		411,565	97.73	
Total rejected ballots		9,550	2.27	
Turnout		421,115	37.07	-1.25
Eligible voters		1,135,883		

2013 Montreal municipal election: Borough Mayor:Villeray–Saint-Michel–Parc-Extension
Party	Candidate	Votes	%	±%
Équipe Denis Coderre	Anie Samson	12,395	35.61	–
Projet Montréal	Nathalie Goulet	11,665	33.52	+10.46
Coalition Montréal	Soraya Martinez Ferrada	5,447	15.65	new
Vrai changement	Béatrice Zako	5,296	15.22	new
Total valid votes/expense limit		34,803	95.67	–
Total rejected ballots		1,576	4.33	+0.41
Turnout		36,379	42.08	+3.43
Eligible voters		86,454	–	–

2009 Montreal municipal election: City Councillor-Saint-Michel
Party	Candidate	Votes	%	±%
Union Montreal	Frantz Benjamin	2,898	43.41	-1.80
Vision Montreal	Soraya Martinez Ferrada	2,478	37.12	-5.86
Projet Montréal	Jack Thierry Morency	891	13.35	+1.54
Montréal Ville-Marie	Valentino Nelson	409	6.13	–
Total valid votes/expense limit		6,676	93.38	–
Total rejected ballots		435	6.12	–
Turnout		7,111	32.66	–
Eligible voters		21,770	–	–

2005 Montreal municipal election: City Councillor-Saint-Michel
Party	Candidate	Votes	%	±%
Citizens Union	Soraya Martinez Ferrada	2,883	45.21	+15.59
Vision Montreal	Nicole Roy-Arcelin	2,741	42.98	-22.26
Projet Montréal	Eric Daoust	1,965	23.39	new
Total valid votes/expense limit		6,377	100.00	–
Total rejected ballots		–	–	–
Turnout		–	–	–
Eligible voters		–	–	–
