= Minister of Economic Development and Official Languages =

Canadian cabinet position (2019–2021)

Minister of Economic Development and Official Languages of Canada
- Incumbent; Vacant since 26 October 2021
- Innovation, Science and Economic Development Canada
- Style: The Honourable
- Member of: Cabinet; Privy Council
- Nominator: Prime Minister
- Appointer: Governor General
- Term length: At His Majesty's pleasure
- Salary: $264,400 (2019)
- Website: www.ic.gc.ca www.canada.ca/en/canadian-heritage

The Minister of Economic Development and Official Languages (French: Ministre du Développement économique et des Langues officielles) is a Minister of the Crown in the Canadian Cabinet. The minister is responsible for Canada's six regional development agencies: the Atlantic Canada Opportunities Agency, the Canadian Northern Economic Development Agency, the Economic Development Agency of Canada for the Regions of Quebec, the Federal Economic Development Agency for Southern Ontario, the Federal Economic Development Initiative for Northern Ontario, and Western Economic Diversification Canada.

== List of ministers ==
Minister	Tenure		Prime Minister
Mélanie Joly	November 20, 2019	October 26, 2021	J. Trudeau (29)
