= Minister of Border Security and Organized Crime Reduction =

Former Canadian cabinet ministerial position

Minister of Border Security and Organized Crime Reduction of Canada
- Public Safety Canada
- Style: The Honourable
- Member of: Cabinet; Privy Council
- Appointer: Governor General of Canada
- Term length: At His Majesty's pleasure
- Inaugural holder: Bill Blair
- Formation: 18 July 2018
- Abolished: 20 November 2019
- Salary: $255,300 (2017)

The Minister of Border Security and Organized Crime Reduction (French: Ministre de la Sécurité frontalière et de la Réduction du crime organisé) was a short-lived secondary ministerial position under Public Safety Canada with focus of combating organized crime and "irregular migration."

It was a new portfolio introduced in July 2018 during the government of Justin Trudeau. Some criticisms upon its creation included that, it fuelled an "unfounded sense of crisis;" wantonly conflated border security and organized crime; and added further confusion regarding roles and responsibilities, as there already exists overlaps between the portfolio of Immigration, Refugees and Citizenship and that of Public Safety and Emergency Preparedness (which includes the Canada Border Services Agency and the RCMP).

The last and only office holder was Bill Blair. Since 2024, Dominic LeBlanc holds the border security portfolio without it being an official ministry.

== List of ministers ==
Liberal Party of Canada

No.	Name	Term of office		Political party	Ministry
1	Bill Blair	July 18, 2018	November 20, 2019	Liberal	29 (J. Trudeau)
