= Minister of Mental Health and Addictions =

Canadian cabinet position (2021–2025)

- Ministre de la Santé mentale et des Dépendances
- Incumbent; Vacant since March 14, 2025
- Health Canada
- Style: The Honourable
- Member of: Parliament; Privy Council; Cabinet
- Reports to: Parliament; Prime Minister
- Appointer: Monarch (represented by the governor general) on the advice of the prime minister
- Term length: At His Majesty's pleasure
- Salary: CA$299,900 (2024)
- Website: hc-sc.gc.ca

The minister of mental health and addictions (French: ministre de la santé mentale et des dépendances) was a minister of the Crown and a member of the Canadian Cabinet tasked with supporting the Government of Canada's mental health and addictions related priorities. The office was associated with the Department of Health.

The position was created in 2021 as a portfolio for Carolyn Bennett. Ya'ara Saks was the second and last minister of mental health and addictions. She was appointed on July 26, 2023, and concurrently served as the associate minister of health. The position was abolished at the start of the 30th Canadian Ministry

== Mandate ==
In his 2021 mandate letter, Prime Minister Justin Trudeau assigned the first minister, Carolyn Bennett the following responsibilities:

- Helping to establish a permanent, ongoing Canada Mental Health Transfer to help expand the delivery of free mental health services.
- Developing and implementing a "comprehensive, evidence-based plan," including to:
  - "Develop mental health standards, with a particular focus on health equity;"
  - "Sustain improved access to virtual mental health services with Wellness Together Canada;"
  - "Ensure timely access to perinatal mental health services;"
  - "Implement a three-digit suicide prevention hotline;" and
  - "Introduce a new fund for student mental health"
- "Support the Minister of Indigenous Services to co-develop and invest in a distinctions-based Mental Health and Wellness Strategy to meet the needs of" Canada's Indigenous Peoples.
- Oversee the implementation of the federal government's investments in "mental health interventions and supports for people disproportionately impacted by COVID-19, including health care workers, front-line workers, seniors, Indigenous people, and Black and racialized Canadians."
- "Work with the Minister of Families, Children and Social Development and Minister for Women and Gender Equality and Youth to ensure mental health supports are accessible to children and youth as they recover from the impact of the pandemic."
- "Advance a comprehensive strategy to address problematic substance use in Canada"
- "Require tobacco manufacturers to pay for the cost of federal public health investments in tobacco control."
- "Support the Minister of Public Safety to continue advancing Canada’s first-ever National Action Plan on Post-Traumatic Stress Injuries."
- "Support the Minister of Veterans Affairs to ensure Canadian Armed Forces members and Veterans have access to adequate mental health resources, services and training programs tailored to their specific needs."
- Explore "pathways to increase the accessibility of mental health services in rural areas," with the support of the Minister of Rural Economic Development.

== List of ministers ==
Minister	Tenure		Prime Minister
Carolyn Bennett	October 26, 2021	July 26, 2023	29 (J. Trudeau)
Ya'ara Saks	July 26, 2023	March 14, 2025	29 (J. Trudeau)
