= Minister of Digital Government =

Canadian cabinet minister (2018–2019)

Minister of Digital Government of Canada
- Style: The Honourable
- Member of: Cabinet; Privy Council; Treasury Board
- Appointer: Monarch (represented by the governor general); on the advice of the prime minister
- Term length: At Her Majesty's pleasure
- Inaugural holder: Scott Brison
- Formation: 18 July 2018
- Final holder: Joyce Murray
- Abolished: 26 October 2021
- Salary: $264,400 (2019)
- Website: canada.ca/en/shared-services.html

The minister of Digital Government (French: ministre du Gouvernement numérique) was a minister of the Crown in the Canadian Cabinet with responsibility for Shared Services Canada (SSC)—the federal department that manages and maintains information technology services throughout the Government of Canada, as well as the digital strategies and programs of the Treasury Board of Canada Secretariat. (The first two ministers of Digital Government were also concurrently the president of the Treasury Board.)

This position was introduced in the 29th Canadian Ministry under the premiership of Justin Trudeau. Prior to 2018, responsibility for oversight of SSC was in the portfolio of the minister of Public Services and Procurement. In 2021, the position was abolished and responsibility for SSC was returned to the Minister of Public Services and Procurement.

== List of ministers ==
Key:

Liberal Party of Canada

No.	Portrait	Name	Term of office		Political party	Ministry
1		Scott Brison	July 18, 2018	January 13, 2019	Liberal	29 (J. Trudeau)
2		Jane Philpott	January 14, 2019	March 4, 2019	Liberal	29 (J. Trudeau)
3		Joyce Murray	March 18, 2019	October 26, 2021	Liberal	29 (J. Trudeau)
