= Minister of Small Business (Canada) =

Federal cabinet position (1976–2025)

Secretary of State (Small Business)
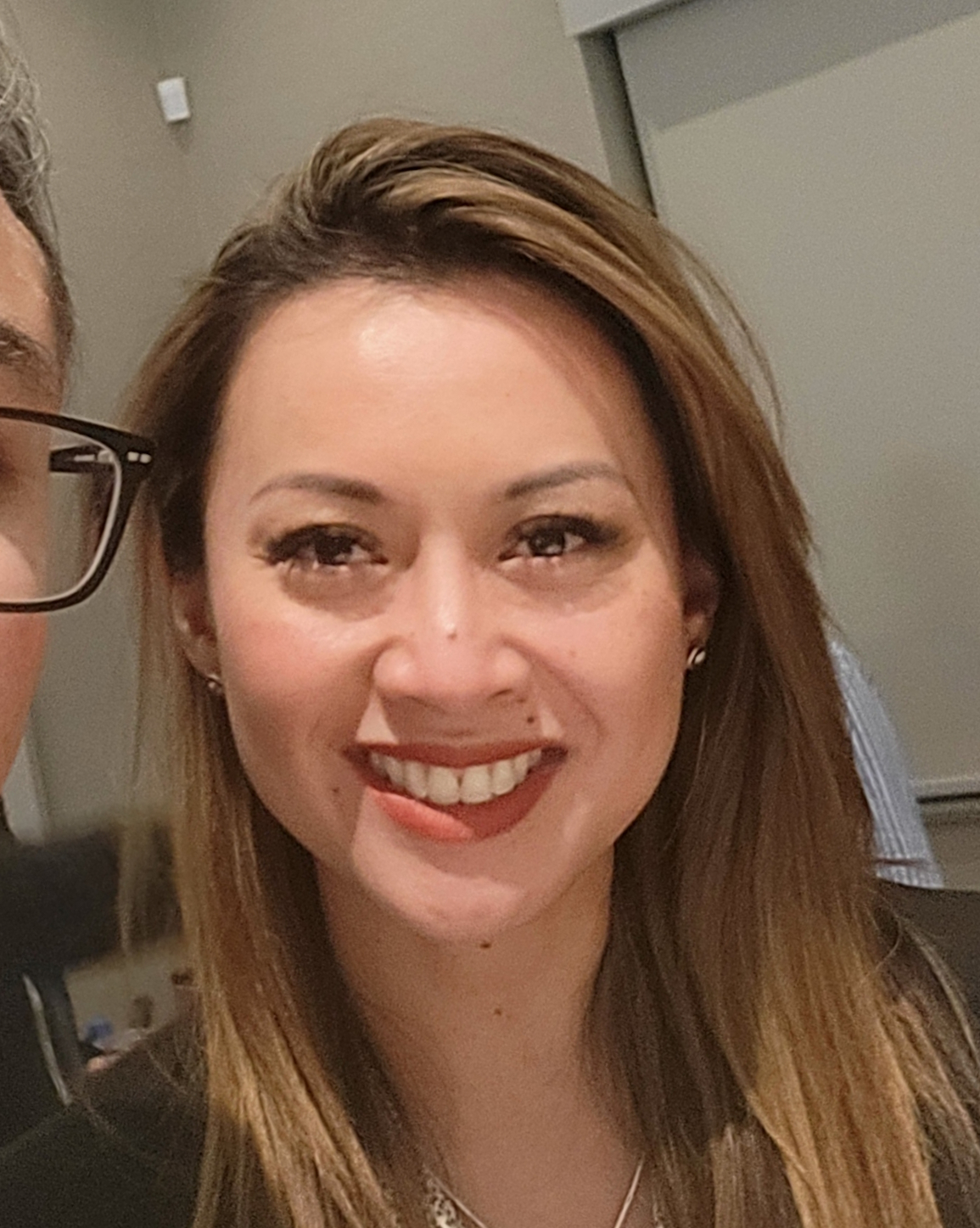
- Incumbent; Rechie Valdez since May 13, 2025
- Innovation, Science and Economic Development Canada
- Style: The Honourable
- Member of: Cabinet; Privy Council
- Appointer: Monarch (represented by the governor general) on the advice of the prime minister
- Term length: At His Majesty's pleasure
- Inaugural holder: Leonard Marchand
- Formation: 30 September 1976
- Salary: CA$299,900 (2024)
- Website: www.international.gc.ca www.ic.gc.ca

The minister of small business (French: ministre de la petite entreprise) is a minister of the Crown in the Canadian Cabinet.

== History ==
Before 2015, the Cabinet position responsible for small business was filled by either a Minister of State or Secretary of State. On November 4, 2015, upon the formation of the 29th Canadian Ministry, the position was named Minister of Small Business and Tourism without "of State" but remained formally a Minister of State "to assist the Minister of Industry" (the senior portfolio now styled as the Minister of Innovation, Science and Economic Development).

Following the 2019 election, responsibility for small business was given to the newly created Minister of International Trade, Export Promotion, Small Business and Economic Development, before eventually becoming its own post once again in 2023.

== List of ministers ==
Key:

Liberal Party of Canada
Progressive Conservative Party of Canada
Conservative Party of Canada

No.	Portrait	Name	Term of office		Political party	Ministry
Minister of State (Small Businesses)
1		Leonard Marchand	September 30, 1976	September 15, 1977	Liberal	20 (P. E. Trudeau)
2		Tony Abbott	September 16, 1977	June 3, 1979	Liberal	20 (P. E. Trudeau)
Minister of State for Small Businesses and Industry
3		Ron Huntington	June 4, 1979	March 2, 1980	Progressive Conservative	21 (Clark)
Minister of State (Small Businesses and Tourism)
4		Charles Lapointe	March 3, 1980	September 29, 1982	Liberal	22 (P. E. Trudeau)
5		Bill Rompkey	September 30, 1982	August 11, 1983	Liberal	22 (P. E. Trudeau)
6		David Smith	August 12, 1982	June 29, 1984	Liberal	22 (P. E. Trudeau)
6		David Smith	June 30, 1984	September 16, 1984	Liberal	23 (Turner)
Minister of State (Small Businesses)
7		André Bissonnette	September 17, 1984	June 29, 1986	Progressive Conservative	24 (Mulroney)
Minister of State (Small Businesses and Tourism)
8		Bernard Valcourt	June 30, 1986	January 29, 1989	Progressive Conservative	24 (Mulroney)
9		Tom Hockin	January 30, 1989	June 24, 1993	Progressive Conservative	24 (Mulroney)
Minister responsible for Small Business
10		Rob Nicholson	June 25, 1993	November 3, 1993	Progressive Conservative	25 (Campbell)
	vacant		November 4, 1993	December 11, 2003	Liberal	26 (Chrétien)
	vacant		December 12, 2003	February 5, 2006	Liberal	27 (Martin)
	vacant		February 6, 2006	January 3, 2007	Conservative	28 (Harper)
Secretary of State (Small Business and Tourism)
11		Gerry Ritz	January 4, 2007	August 13, 2007	Conservative	28 (Harper)
12		Diane Ablonczy	August 14, 2007	October 29, 2008	Conservative	28 (Harper)
Minister of State (Small Business and Tourism)
(12)		Diane Ablonczy	October 30, 2008	January 18, 2010	Conservative	28 (Harper)
13		Rob Moore	January 19, 2010	May 17, 2011	Conservative	28 (Harper)
14		Maxime Bernier	May 18, 2011	July 14, 2013	Conservative	28 (Harper)
Minister of State (Small Business and Tourism, and Agriculture)
(14)		Maxime Bernier	July 15, 2013	November 3, 2015	Conservative	28 (Harper)
Minister of Small Business and Tourism
15		Bardish Chagger	November 4, 2015	July 18, 2018	Liberal	29 (J. Trudeau)
Minister of Small Business and Export Promotion
16		Mary Ng	July 18, 2018	November 20, 2019	Liberal	29 (J. Trudeau)
Minister of Small Business, Export Promotion and International Trade
(16)		Mary Ng	November 20, 2019	October 26, 2021	Liberal	29 (J. Trudeau)
Minister of International Trade, Export Promotion, Small Business and Economic Development
(16)		Mary Ng	October 26, 2021	July 26, 2023	Liberal	29 (J. Trudeau)
Minister of Small Business
17		Rechie Valdez	July 26, 2023	March 14, 2025	Liberal	29 (J. Trudeau)
	vacant		March 14, 2025	May 13, 2025	Liberal	30 (Carney)
Secretary of State (Small Businesses and Tourism)
(17)		Rechie Valdez	May 13, 2025		Liberal	30 (Carney)
