= Minister of Sport and Physical Activity =

Canadian federal cabinet position (1961–2025)

Secretary of State (Sport)
- Incumbent; Adam van Koeverden since May 13, 2025
- Style: The Honourable
- Status: current
- Member of: Cabinet; Privy Council
- Appointer: Monarch (represented by the governor general); on the advice of the prime minister
- Term length: At His Majesty's pleasure
- Inaugural holder: Jay Monteith (Minister of Amateur Sport)
- Formation: September 29, 1961
- Salary: CA$299,900 (2024)
- Website: www.canada.ca/canadian-heritage

The minister of Sport is a Government of Canada cabinet minister responsible for Sport Canada (and sports in Canada, more generally), who typically assists the minister of Canadian Heritage.

The specific name of the ministerial designation has changed many times since the position was introduced in 1961, typically depending on the portfolio it falls under. It was originally known as the Minister of Amateur Sport, answering to the Minister of National Health and Welfare. The position was then relegated to the Secretary of State in 1976, with various titles, only to return as a full cabinet position in 2015. That year, the title was changed to Minister of Sport and Persons with Disabilities following the appointment of Carla Qualtrough and the addition of the responsibility toward disability in Canada to the portfolio. In 2018, shortly after Kirsty Duncan assumed the role, the name was changed to the Minister of Science and Sport.

After the 2019 federal election, Prime Minister Justin Trudeau did not appoint a Minister for Sport, passing on this responsibility to the Minister of Canadian Heritage, Steven Guilbeault at the time. After the 2021 federal election, the position was once again spun out, and Pascale St-Onge was appointed to the office. In a 2023 cabinet shuffle Carla Qualtrough was appointed to the office again, and the name was changed to Minister of Sport and Physical Activity. Terry Duguid was appointed to the office in 2024, at which point the name was shortened back to Minister of Sport.

The position was reduced to a secretary of state position in the 30th Canadian Ministry, the Secretary of State (Sport).

== Ministers ==
Name	Title	Parent organization	Party	Took Office	Left Office
Jay Monteith	Minister of Amateur Sport	National Health and Welfare	PC	September 29, 1961	April 21, 1963
Judy LaMarsh	Minister of Amateur Sport	National Health and Welfare	Lib	April 22, 1963	December 17, 1965
Allan MacEachen	Minister of Amateur Sport	National Health and Welfare	Lib	December 18, 1965	July 5, 1968
John Munro	Minister of Amateur Sport	National Health and Welfare	Lib	July 6, 1968	November 26, 1972
Marc Lalonde	Minister responsible for Fitness and Amateur Sport	National Health and Welfare	Lib	November 27, 1972	September 14, 1976
Iona Campagnolo	Minister of State (Fitness and Amateur Sport)	National Health and Welfare	Lib	September 15, 1976	June 3, 1979
Steve Paproski	Minister of State for Fitness and Amateur Sport and Multiculturalism	Secretary of State	PC	June 4, 1979	March 2, 1980
Gerald Regan	Minister of State (Sports)	National Health and Welfare	Lib	March 3, 1980	March 5, 1980
Gerald Regan	Minister of Amateur Sport	Labour	Lib	March 6, 1980	September 29, 1982
Raymond Perrault	Minister of State (Fitness and Amateur Sport)	National Health and Welfare	Lib	September 30, 1982	August 11, 1983
Celine Hervieux-Payette	Minister of State (Fitness and Amateur Sport)	National Health and Welfare	Lib	August 12, 1983	January 9, 1984
Joseph Olivier	Minister of State (Fitness and Amateur Sport)	National Health and Welfare	Lib	January 10, 1984	June 29, 1984
Jean Lapierre	Minister of State (Fitness and Amateur Sport)	National Health and Welfare	Lib	June 30, 1984	September 16, 1984
Otto Jelinek	Minister of State (Fitness and Amateur Sport)	National Health and Welfare	PC	September 17, 1984	March 30, 1988
Jean Charest	Minister of State (Fitness and Amateur Sport)	National Health and Welfare	PC	March 31, 1988	January 23, 1990
Perrin Beatty	Minister of State (Fitness and Amateur Sport)	National Health and Welfare	PC	January 24, 1990	February 22, 1990
Marcel Danis	Minister of State (Fitness and Amateur Sport)	National Health and Welfare	PC	February 23, 1990	April 20, 1991
Pierre Cadieux	Minister of State (Fitness and Amateur Sport)	National Health and Welfare	PC	April 21, 1991	June 24, 1993
Mary Collins	Minister of Amateur Sport	National Health and Welfare	PC	June 25, 1993	November 3, 1993
Diane Marleau	Minister of Amateur Sport	National Health and Welfare	Lib	November 4, 1993	January 24, 1996
David Dingwall	Minister of Amateur Sport	National Health and Welfare	Lib	January 25, 1996	July 11, 1996
Sheila Copps	Minister of Amateur Sport	National Health and Welfare	Lib	July 12, 1996	August 2, 1999
Denis Coderre	Secretary of State (Amateur Sport)	Heritage	Lib	August 3, 1999	January 14, 2002
Paul Devillers	Secretary of State (Amateur Sport)	Heritage	Lib	January 15, 2002	June 19, 2003
Paul Devillers	Secretary of State (Physical Activity and Sport)	Health	Lib	June 20, 2003	December 11, 2003
Stan Keyes	Minister of State (Sport)	Heritage	Lib	December 12, 2003	July 19, 2004
Stephen Owen	Minister of State (Sport)	Heritage	Lib	July 20, 2004	February 5, 2006
Michael Chong	Minister for Sport	Heritage	Con	February 6, 2006	November 26, 2006
Peter Van Loan	Minister for Sport	Heritage	Con	November 27, 2006	January 3, 2007
Helena Guergis	Secretary of State (Foreign Affairs and International Trade) (Sport)	Heritage and Foreign Affairs & International Trade	Con	January 4, 2007	October 29, 2008
Gary Lunn	Minister of State (Sport)	Heritage	Con	October 30, 2008	May 18, 2011
Bal Gosal	Minister of State (Sport)	Heritage	Con	May 18, 2011	November 4, 2015
Carla Qualtrough	Minister of Sport and Persons with Disabilities	Heritage	Lib	November 4, 2015	August 28, 2017
Kent Hehr	Minister of Sport and Persons with Disabilities	Heritage and Employment & Social Development	Lib	August 28, 2017	January 25, 2018
Kirsty Duncan	Minister of Sport and Persons with Disabilities	Heritage, Industry, and Employment & Social Development	Lib	January 25, 2018	July 18, 2018
Kirsty Duncan	Minister of Science and Sport	Heritage and Industry	Lib	July 18, 2018	November 21, 2019
Responsibilities for Sport transferred to the Minister of Canadian Heritage				November 21, 2019	October 26, 2021
Pascale St-Onge	Minister of Sport	Heritage	Lib	October 26, 2021	July 26, 2023
Carla Qualtrough	Minister of Sport and Physical Activity	Heritage	Lib	July 26, 2023	December 20, 2024
Terry Duguid	Minister of Sport	Heritage	Lib	December 20, 2024	March 14, 2025
Adam van Koeverden	Secretary of State (Sport)		Lib	May 13, 2025	incumbent
