= Canadian Northern Economic Development Agency =

Policy initiative

Minister responsible for the Canadian Northern Economic Development Agency
- Incumbent; Rebecca Chartrand since May 13, 2025
- Government of Canada
- Style: The Honourable
- Member of: Cabinet; Privy Council
- Appointer: Monarch (represented by the governor general); on the advice of the prime minister
- Term length: At His Majesty's pleasure

The Canadian Northern Economic Development Agency (CanNor; French: l'Agence canadienne de développement économique du Nord) is a policy initiative announced by Prime Minister Stephen Harper of the Federal Conservative Party in August 2009. The purpose of the agency is to promote economic development and prosperity while protecting national sovereignty in Northern Canada. CanNor is situated in Iqaluit, Nunavut. By centralizing this economic program in the Northern region of Canada, the Federal Government believes that it will contribute to increased participation by local communities and government in federal policy. From this, CanNor is also responsible for the Northern Projects Management Office (NPMO), which serves as a review board for economic developments in Northern Canada. As of July 2, 2014, the current President of CanNor is Paula Isaak. The Government of Canada is responsible for CanNor, with Dan Vandal, Minister responsible for the Canadian Northern Economic Development Agency, overseeing the developments within the agency. In various programs, CanNor promotes the growth of the economy, education, infrastructure development, and culture in Yukon, Northwest Territories, and Nunavut. CanNor was created from the policy initiative "Northern Strategy," developed to exercise sovereignty, promote social and economic development, protecting the heritage surrounding Native peoples in the Arctic region, as well as asserting continual governance.

The Canadian Northern Economic Development Agency originated from pressure on the Canadian Government to protect the sovereignty of sparsely populated Northern Canada, as well as to use the effects of climate change to extract previously inaccessible resources. Additionally, it has been found that as of 2007, the Northwest Passage has been at certain times of the year completely free of ice, leading to the possibility of this Arctic region becoming a shipping route. From surveys, there are deposits of gas and oil in the Arctic, with extraction being possible due to milder temperatures and less permafrost in the Territories. By creating economic incentives in the Arctic, it will lead to greater strength in the claim for Canadian sovereignty. There is an increasing demand for resources available in the Canadian Arctic, leading to the need for a continued presence by the Canadian government to assert control over this relatively uninhabited landmass.

A main focus of CanNor is to increase the availability of jobs for Aboriginal Canadians. It is known that the ability to live off of the land in the northern region of Canada is becoming increasingly difficult due to the effect of climate change. While economic prosperity may lead to a better standard of living in isolated areas, it is likely to create conditions that will make it difficult for the Inuit to continue a self-sustaining way of life.

== Sovereignty in the Arctic ==
The creation of an economic regime in the Arctic region will lead to certain negative effects. Climate change has been viewed as a global problem that needs to be reversed through the adoption of clean energy initiatives and non-invasive resource extraction. Further exploitation of untapped resources continues to harm the environment. With Canadian sovereignty in the northern region being disputed, there is a need for an increasingly large military presence to protect resources. From the institution of economic initiatives in the Arctic, it may lead to the creation of jobs in a Canadian region that is known for few opportunities.

Based in select crises such as World War II and the Cold War, the Arctic has been viewed as an important area in protecting North American sovereignty for the United States and Canada. With the United States attempting to assert a military presence in the Arctic, it has led to the demand for Canadian sovereignty by the public. While the public holds this view towards the need to protect borders from Russia, Norway, Denmark and the United States, the demand for possession of resources in the Arctic is not a necessity. From this, other needs are to be taken into consideration rather than immediately looking to profit from this endeavour. The Northwest Passage is likely to be a pivotal shipping route as Arctic ice continues to melt at a rapid pace.

From initial colonization of Canada, a large portion of the Northern region has been left uninhabited. This is due to the cold climate making it impossible to grow crops or build infrastructure up to present day, as well as the relatively low population density in Southern Canada. As the Northern region continues to rapidly warm, there may be an increase in migration north, leading to infrastructure being put in place. A significant reason why CanNor began to stake claims in the north is due to disputed claim to sovereignty in the Arctic Circle. In most cases, a country can assert claim to a landmass if there is a stable governance system within the area. Canada unquestionably holds sovereignty in all areas wherein Canadian citizens live, which includes Nunavut, the Yukon, and the Northwest Territories. A variable that has been contested towards claiming absolute sovereignty of the Northern area is that there needs to be a defined boundary. Although Canada has asserted a claim towards the majority of the Arctic, this claim has been debated by the international community and remains unclear. Due to the lack of infrastructure and citizens in the area, Canada does not have a definitive claim to the Arctic if Northern sovereignty were to be threatened by another country. Through the CanNor initiative, the Canadian Government is attempting to develop the region to combat this problem.

== Resources available ==
A central purpose for the creation of CanNor is to exploit the resources available in unused territory. The Canadian Government plans on creating commercial fisheries in the Arctic region by building infrastructure in 2013. In addition, a hydroelectric power plant is being built in Lower Churchill to create infrastructure towards expanding the economy and population in the Northern region. Although Nunavut only currently has one mine, there are over ten mineral extraction projects set to be in place by 2020. There are 25 other possible projects that are undergoing exploration towards ore extraction in the future, leading to a possibility of a growing economy and increased revenue.

As permafrost continues to melt due to rising temperatures, oil will become a profitable resource found from the Arctic. There is a presumed 90 billion barrels of oil and 770 trillion cubic feet of gas in the Arctic Circle. It has been estimated that from prospecting, there is more oil in the Arctic on and offshore than in the Western provinces. In addition, two of the largest underdeveloped gas fields are in the Arctic region, which poses opportunities for further development in the Northern territories. Petroleum has been located in the Canada Basin, but the remoteness, deep water, and ice conditions pose a risk for major investment. From this, there are a large amount of available resources to be extracted from the Arctic region. Government investment is necessary to stimulate a new Northern economy. Another additional resource in the Arctic Circle is the Northwest Passage becoming a shipping route in the future. Satellite mapping has confirmed late-summer sea ice has been decreasing steadily since 2006. If climate-induced changes continue at the current rate, the Northwest Passage will likely be completely free of ice between 2040 and 2059, leading to the possibility of becoming a shipping route in the near future.

== Job prospects ==
Part of the CanNor organization is to create stable jobs in the three Territories, an area that is struggling with unemployment. In relation to capitalizing on the available resources in the north, CanNor hopes to use the economic expansion and growth in infrastructure to instigate training and education towards job growth for Canadians. Since the majority of citizens living in the Territories are primarily First Nations and Inuit, this project is to foster job growth for these remote communities. Since the project is in the early stages of development, it is not possible to state how many projected jobs that CanNor will create. The projected budgetary spending of this initiative from 2017 to 2018 is to be $25,109,964, and it is funded by the government with a goal of creating a new economy to support the prospering of Canadian citizens in the far-North.

With steady growth of infrastructure and job creation, there is likely going to be negative and positive impacts on the people and land in the Territories. As of 2017, the employment rate by percentage in the Yukon is 67.7%; in the Northwest Territories, 69.3%; and in Nunavut, 55%. Despite the low population in this region, the insignificant participation in the job market is a key contributor to poverty and social problems in this isolated area. To be able to combat the serious issues faced by Aboriginal Canadians living in isolated areas, improving socio-economic conditions is necessary. In decreasing joblessness and the problems associated to poverty, access to financial aid, resources, training, and infrastructure is suggested. Employment is traditionally founded on past education, which is also a significant problem in the Northern Territories. Nunavut and Northwest Territories have a 30% and 45% secondary school graduation rate for Indigenous Canadians aged 20–24, respectively. The clear gap in education for the isolated Territories is a challenge that infrastructure, alternative education, and career prospects may be able to solve. From the planned initiatives by CanNor, boosting the Northern economy seeks to combat these problems.

Although stimulating the economy and bringing revenue to an area in need of it seems like a clear solution, there are other factors that produce a negative picture. Mining has been a presence in the far North since 1957, creating a negative view towards expansion policy initiated by the Conservative Government. Although it is accepted that a growing economy is financially beneficial towards the inhabitants, there are social problems such as drug and alcohol abuse brought on by temporary financial stability. There are also concerns related to employment, with older mines in the area having a high turnover rate and difficult working conditions. For the Inuit, there is also a concern with the separation and disappearance of the traditional subsistence culture by working in a mine or for a government corporation. Further challenges exist as the Indigenous groups in Northern Canada are faced with possible transition from a traditional life.

== Climate change ==
With petroleum-based resources being a significant reason for CanNor to organize an expansion into northern Canada, it is expected to cause a negative environmental reaction. CanNor seeks to foster sustainable energy as it continues developing infrastructure in the territories. A planned initiative for the organization is to, "support the effective implementation of environmental assessment processes for major projects in the North, including the coordination of participating federal departments and agencies." While unveiling the CanNor policy initiative, environmental critics established a negative view of the government facilitating Northern expansion. The CanNor policy perspective is contrary to contemporary environmental policy. The Arctic region of Canada is a fragile ecosystem, with the area warming at twice the rate as the rest of the world in the past twenty years. There are a number of issues associated with the North warming due to climate change. Climate change will affect the local wildlife reliant on cold temperatures, such as seals, polar bears, and sea birds. Permafrost is continuing to melt, which is leading to the expansion of forests northward. Rising ocean levels will lead to the disruption of coastal communities. In addition, further infrastructure and road maintenance will be necessary as permafrost continues to melt, leading to the elimination of winter ice roads.

In association to the overall effects of climate change, ecological damage from the extraction of minerals and oil may have an effect on communities in the Arctic region. In mining communities, there have been reported complaints of damage to the ecosystem. From local mining operations, damage to bodies of water is noted to cause poisoning from eating fish and other wildlife. The Inuit are reliant on consistent seasons for hunting caribou. Due to the early melting of sea ice, migratory patterns of caribou have changed, leading to Indigenous communities being forced to change their hunting patterns.

== Impact on Aboriginal Peoples ==
In association to climate change directly affecting on Aboriginal communities in the Northern Territories, there are a number of factors related to the CanNor project. Approximately half of the total residents in the Territories are people associated to Aboriginal cultural groups. More than 70% of Aboriginal people harvest natural resources from the environment. From this, economic expansion into the Northern Territories poses a risk and challenges to the Indigenous population and the environment. Climate change will affect Northern communities, leading to unstable seasons and overall warming. In Nunavut, poverty continues to be a problem. Today, the Inuit are largely dependent on imported products as they shift from subsistence living towards the market economy. The overall poverty rate in Nunatsiavut, an area in Northern Newfoundland and Labrador, is found to be 24.7%, far above the national average. By stimulating the economy in Northern Canada, CanNor is based on targeting joblessness and poverty in Aboriginal communities. In addition to the economic advantages produced by CanNor, the Federal Government believes that this initiative will centralize government decisions associated with the Territories in the Northern communities. This is to give the Aboriginal peoples in the area a greater sense of self-determination towards changes in their own communities.
