= Rechie Valdez =

Canadian politician (born 1980)

The Honourable Rechie Valdez PC MP
- Valdez in 2026

Minister for Women and Gender Equality
- Incumbent
- Assumed office May 13, 2025
- Prime Minister: Mark Carney
- Preceded by: Marci Ien (Women and Gender Equality and Youth)

Secretary of State (Small Business and Tourism)
- Incumbent
- Assumed office May 13, 2025
- Prime Minister: Mark Carney
- Preceded by: Gerry Ritz (Minister of State)

Chief Government Whip
- In office March 14, 2025 – May 13, 2025
- Prime Minister: Mark Carney
- Preceded by: Mona Fortier
- Succeeded by: Mark Gerretsen

Minister of Small Business
- In office July 26, 2023 – March 14, 2025
- Prime Minister: Justin Trudeau
- Preceded by: Mary Ng
- Succeeded by: Position discontinued

Member of Parliament for Mississauga—Streetsville
- Incumbent
- Assumed office September 20, 2021
- Preceded by: Gagan Sikand

Personal details
- Born: Rechie Aileen Salazar; September 17, 1980 (age 46) Kitwe, Zambia
- Party: Liberal
- Spouse: Christopher Valdez
- Children: 2
- Education: University of Windsor (BSc)
- Profession: Politician

Rechie Aileen Valdez (née Salazar, born September 17, 1980) is a Canadian politician who has been Minister for Women and Gender Equality, and Secretary of State (Small Business and Tourism) since 2025. She was previously Minister of Small Business from 2023 to 2025 and Chief Government Whip in 2025. A member of the Liberal Party, Valdez was elected as the member of Parliament (MP) for Mississauga—Streetsville in the 2021 federal election. She is the first Filipino Canadian woman to serve as a Cabinet minister and MP.

== Early life, education and work ==
Valdez was born Rechie Aileen Salazar on September 17, 1980 to overseas Filipino workers Zosimo Jr. and Normita Salazar in Kitwe, Zambia. The family eventually migrated to Canada in 1989, residing in the Erin Mills neighbourhood of Mississauga, Ontario together with her brother. Valdez went to St. Joseph Secondary School and Holy Name of Mary College School where she graduated in 1993; and completed a computer science degree at the University of Windsor in 2003.

=== Career ===
Valdez spent 15 years in corporate banking, before venturing into business. She owned a baking business, had competed in The Big Bake on Food Network Canada, and hosted and produced a television show Fearlessly Creative on Filipino TV.

== Political career ==
Valdez was elected to Parliament in the 2021 federal election. She was named Minister of Small Business in 2023 by Prime Minister Justin Trudeau.

In 2025, Prime Minister Mark Carney named her Chief Government Whip from March to May. Valdez won re-election in her riding of Mississauga-Streetsville in the 2025 Canadian federal election and was appointed as Minister for Women and Gender Equality and Secretary of State (Small Business and Tourism) in the 45th Canadian Parliament.

She is the first woman of Filipino heritage to be elected as an MP and serve as a Cabinet minister.

=== Minister of Small Business (2023–2025) ===
As Minister of Small Business under the 29th Canadian Ministry, Valdez oversaw federal policy files related to small and medium enterprises, entrepreneurship, business financing, and regulatory costs. Her tenure coincided with several small-business measures in the 2024 federal budget, including the creation of a refundable tax credit to return more than C$2.5 billion in federal fuel charge proceeds to about 600,000 small and medium businesses in provinces where the federal carbon pricing backstop applied. The budget also increased the lifetime capital gains tax exemption to $1.25 million, effective June 25, 2024, and introduced the Canadian Entrepreneurs' Incentive, which reduced the capital gains inclusion rate for up to $2 million in eligible gains. The budget measures were presented by Finance Minister Chrystia Freeland alongside Valdez.

During her tenure, the federal government modified the Canadian Entrepreneurs' Incentive after criticism from business and innovation groups. The changes included a faster phase-in schedule, reduced ownership requirements, and expanded eligibility for small business owners, farmers, and fishers. The Council of Canadian Innovators said the changes did not fully address concerns about the government's capital gains tax changes.

Valdez promoted federal small-business programs through meetings with local business owners and chambers of commerce. In July 2024, she met with entrepreneurs in Sault Ste. Marie, Ontario, where participants raised issues including taxes, labor shortages, public safety concerns, drug use, homelessness, vandalism, and theft affecting downtown businesses.

Her term included changes to payment processing costs for small businesses. In October 2024, the federal government announced that credit card transaction fees for eligible small businesses would be reduced by up to 27 percent, a measure Reuters reported was expected to save eligible businesses more than $1 billion over five years.

The Canada Digital Adoption Program, a $4-billion program launched before Valdez's appointment to help small businesses adopt digital tools, was partly ended during her tenure. The Globe and Mail reported that the grant and loan portions of the program were cancelled after budget reductions, rather than only because the program was fully subscribed as the government had publicly stated. Valdez's office said that the grant and advisory services budget had been reduced from $1.4 billion to $755 million, while the interest-free loans budget had been reduced from $2.6 billion to $494 million.

In March 2025, Valdez joined other ministers in outlining support measures for Canadian businesses and workers affected by United States trade actions. These measures included access to Business Development Bank of Canada loans, Export Development Canada support for exporters, Farm Credit Canada relief for agricultural businesses, and continued use of the Canada Small Business Financing Program.

=== Minister for Women and Gender Equality (2025–present) ===
Valdez's appointment as Minister for Women and Gender Equality in May 2025 restored a designated women and gender equality ministerial portfolio after Carney's first ministry in March 2025 had removed several portfolios, including women and gender equality. The portfolio had generally included responsibility for federal LGBTQ issues and its earlier removal had drawn criticism from gender equity and LGBTQ organizations.

In the portfolio, Valdez was associated with the government's stated commitments on gender equality, gender-based violence, and LGBTQ inclusion. In October 2025, she and Finance Minister François-Philippe Champagne announced more than $660 million over five years for programs related to equality, safety, and inclusion for women, girls, and LGBTQ communities. The proposed funding included support for women's and girls' economic security and leadership, pride parade security costs, and federal responses to gender-based violence.

Valdez has represented Canada internationally on gender equality issues. In March 2026, she led Canada's delegation to the 70th session of the United Nations Commission on the Status of Women. The session focused on access to justice for women and girls, including inclusive legal systems and the removal of discriminatory laws and barriers; Valdez was also expected to address women's participation in public life and violence against women and girls.

=== Secretary of State (Small Business and Tourism) (2025–present) ===
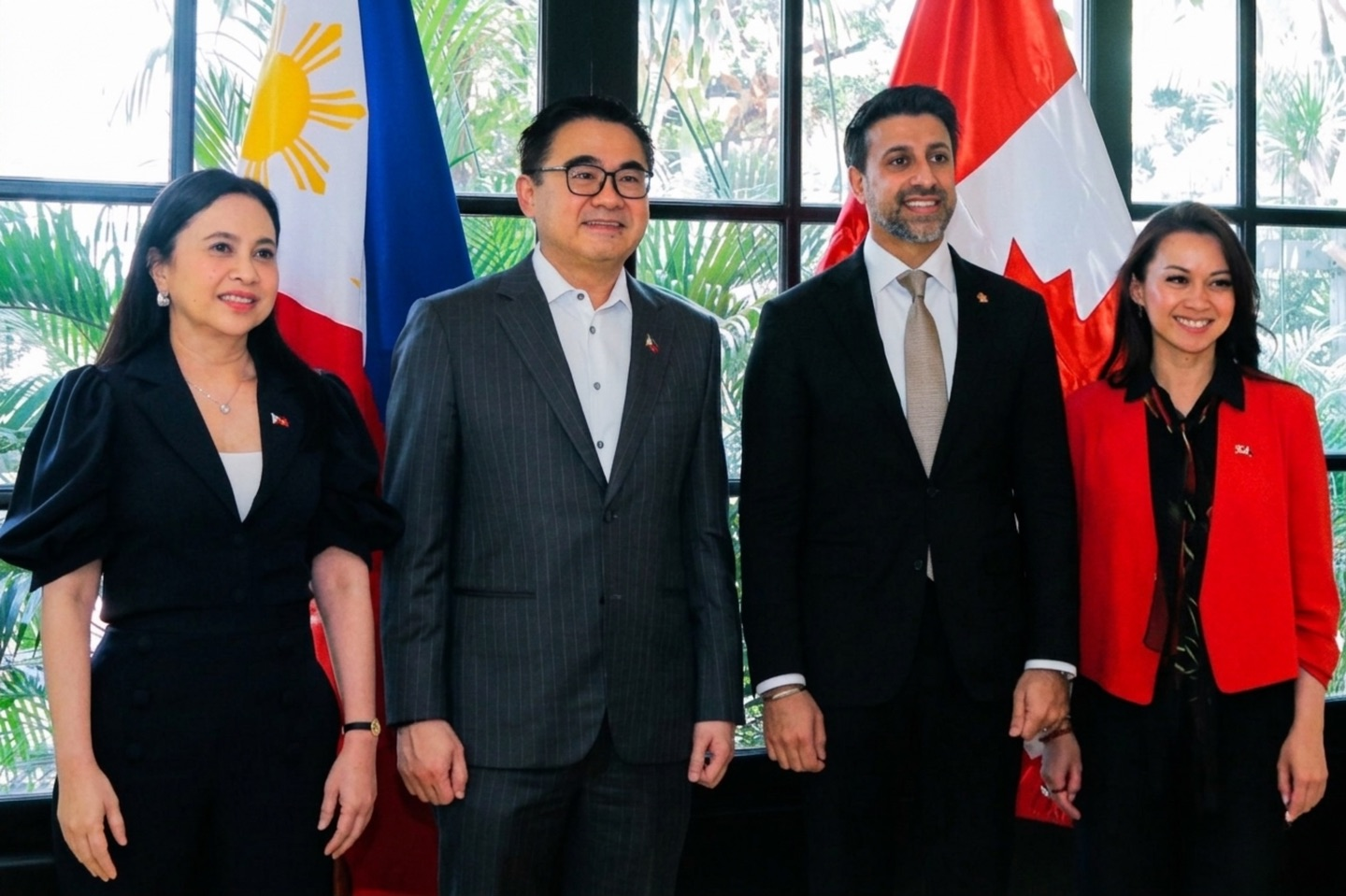
Valdez (right) with Philippine trade secretary Cristina Aldeguer-Roque, finance secretary Frederick Go, and Canadian trade minister Maninder Sidhu following trade negotiations in Manila in May 2026

Valdez was also appointed Secretary of State for Small Business and Tourism in May 2025.

In June 2025, Valdez was involved in the rollout of the "Canada Strong" Pass, a tourism initiative promised during the 2025 federal election. The program was presented as a way to support domestic tourism, with measures including free or discounted access to national museums, galleries, parks, historic sites, camping, and Via Rail travel for eligible young people and families during the summer of 2025.

In November 2025, she announced federal funding in Windsor, Ontario, to support the implementation of the Buy Canadian Policy, a federal procurement policy that directs federal agencies to prioritize Canadian suppliers, goods, services, and materials in government contracts, while allowing purchases from trusted partner countries when Canadian options are unavailable. The announcement included $186 million in total support, including $98.2 million over five years for Public Services and Procurement Canada and $7.7 million over three years for the Treasury Board Secretariat, with the stated goal of helping federal departments and Crown corporations incorporate the policy into procurement practices.

Valdez has announced additional support for Indigenous tourism projects. In March 2026, she announced $6 million in additional funding for the Indigenous Tourism Fund's Signature Indigenous Tourism Experiences Stream, with selected projects in Alberta, British Columbia, Nova Scotia, Ontario, and Quebec. The National Aboriginal Capital Corporations Association, which administers the stream, said the second round of funding supported six Indigenous-led tourism projects and followed an earlier $9.5 million round that supported 11 projects.

== Personal life ==
She is married to Christopher Valdez, and has two children. Outside politics, Valdez plays basketball as a hobby, where she once held a basketball fundraising activity for Montreal Children's Hospital and SickKids in Toronto.

At the time of the 2025 Canadian federal election, she lived in Brampton.

== Election results ==
2025 Canadian federal election: Mississauga—Streetsville
Party	Candidate	Votes	%	±%	Expenditures
Liberal	Rechie Valdez	31,297	51.53	+4.19	$127,819.60
Conservative	Sue McFadden	27,241	44.86	+10.54	$123,776.86
New Democratic	Bushra Asghar	1,388	2.29	–9.80	$24,415.43
Green	Chris Hill	439	0.72	–1.41	$0.00
People's	Logan Araujo	366	0.60	–3.13	$0.00
Total valid votes/expense limit		61,025	99.52	–	$132,569.46
Total rejected ballots		294	0.48		
Turnout		61,319	70.34		
Eligible voters		87,180			
Liberal notional hold		Swing		–3.17	
Source: Elections Canada

2021 Canadian federal election: Mississauga—Streetsville
Party	Candidate	Votes	%	±%	Expenditures
Liberal	Rechie Valdez	23,698	47.3	-3.1	$57,311.79
Conservative	Jasveen Rattan	17,131	34.2	+1.1	$62,172.94
New Democratic	Farina Hassan	6,186	12.3	+2.0	$3,193.29
People's	Gurdeep Wolosz	1,851	3.7	+2.5	$2,365.54
Green	Chris Hill	1,048	2.1	-2.5	$298.25
Animal Protection	Natalie Spizzirri	210	0.4	±0.0	$2,470.94
Total valid votes/expense limit		50,124	99.3	–	$115,206.97
Total rejected ballots		333	0.7		
Turnout		50,457	58.7		
Eligible voters		85,976			
Liberal hold		Swing		-2.1	
Source: Elections Canada

Order of precedence
Preceded by Gary Anandasangaree as Member of the Cabinet	Order of Precedence of Canada as Member of the Cabinet	Succeeded by Steven MacKinnon as Member of the Cabinet
