= Norman Hillmer =

Canadian historian

Norman Hillmer CM
- Born: George Norman Hillmer; 24 November 1942 (age 83); Niagara Falls, Ontario, Canada

Scholarly background
- Education: University of Toronto; Christ's College, Cambridge
- Thesis: Anglo-Canadian Relations, 1926–1937 (1974)

Scholarly work
- Discipline: History
- Sub-discipline: Canadian history
- Institutions: Department of National Defence; Carleton University
- Main interests: Canada–US relations

George Norman Hillmer CM (born 1942) is a Canadian historian and is among the leading scholars on Canada–US relations.

Hillmer completed his Bachelor of Arts and Master of Arts degrees in history at the University of Toronto in 1966 and 1967, respectively, before going on to earn a Doctor of Philosophy degree from Christ's College, Cambridge, in 1974. During this period, he also worked as an assistant to former Prime Minister Lester Pearson, who was then working at Carleton University's Norman Paterson School of International Affairs. In 1972, Hillmer joined the Directorate of History at Canada's Department of National Defence as a staff historian. He rose to become the acting director of the directorate before shifting in 1990 to a full-time career as a professor of history and international affairs at Carleton University, a position he continues to hold.

Hillmer collaborates with other scholars on many of his book projects, often with the respected Canadian historian J. L. Granatstein.

In December 2016, Hillmer was named a Member of the Order of Canada. He is a two-time winner of the C.P. Stacey Prize for "distinguished publications on the twentieth-century military experience."

== Books ==
- O. D. Skelton: A Portrait of Canadian Ambition (Toronto: University of Toronto Press, 2015), xii, 424.
- Canada's International Policies: Agendas, Alternatives, and Politics (Don Mills, Ontario: Oxford University Press, 2008) [with Brian W. Tomlin and Fen Osler Hampson], vi, 432 pp.
- The Atlas of Canada and the World (Vancouver, Toronto, New York: Whitecap Books, 1999), 223 pp.
- Prime Ministers: Ranking Canada's Leaders (Toronto: Harper Collins, 1999) [with J. L. Granatstein], 233 pp.
- Elder Daughter of the Empire: A History of Canadian–British Relations, 1713–1982 (in Japanese; Tosui Shobo, Tokyo, 1997) [with Kazuo Kimura and P. A. Buckner], xii, 271 pp.
- Empire to Umpire: Canada and the World to the 1990s (Toronto: Copp Clark Longman, 1994) [with J. L. Granatstein], ix, 373 pp. Revised and expanded as Empire to Umpire: Canada and the World into the Twenty-First Century (Toronto: Thomson Nelson, 2007), xiii, 393 pp.
- For Better or for Worse: Canada and the United States to the 1990s (Toronto: Copp Clark Pitman, 1991) [with J. L. Granatstein], xvi, 334 pp. Revised and expanded as For Better or for Worse: Canada and the United States into the Twenty-First Century (Toronto: Thomson Nelson, 2007), xviii, 359 pp.
- Negotiating Freer Trade: The United Kingdom, the United States, Canada, and the Trade Agreements of 1938 (Waterloo, Ontario: Wilfrid Laurier University Press, 1989) [with Ian M. Drummond], x, 197 pp.

== Edited books ==
- O. D. Skelton: The Work of the World, 1923–1941 (Montreal and Kingston: McGill-Queen's University Press and The Champlain Society; both editions, 2013), xx, 53 page introduction, 517 pp.
- Canadas of the Mind: The Making and Unmaking of Canadian Nationalisms in the Twentieth Century (Montreal and Kingston: McGill-Queen's University Press, 2007) [with Adam Chapnick], x, 326 pp.
- Fuelling Progress: One Hundred Years of the Canadian Gas Association, 1907–2007 (Ottawa: Canadian Gas Association, 2007) [by Tim Krywulak], xi, 180 pp.
- The Land Newly Found: Eyewitness Accounts of the Canadian Immigrant Experience (Toronto: Thomas Allen Publishers, 2006) [with J.L. Granatstein], 431 pp.
- Canada Among Nations 2004: Setting Priorities Straight (Montreal and Kingston: McGill-Queen's University Press, 2005) [with David Carment and Fen Osler Hampson], x, 291 pp.
- Battle Lines: Eyewitness Accounts from Canada's Military History (Toronto: Thomas Allen Publishers, 2004) [with J.L. Granatstein], 490 pp.
- Among Nations 2003: Coping with the American Colossus (Don Mills, Ontario: Press, 2003) [with David Carment and Fen Osler Hampson], xii, 354 pp.
- Activism and (Non)Alignment: The Relationship Between Foreign Policy and Security Doctrine (Stockholm: The Swedish Institute of International Affairs, 2002) [with Ann-Sofie Dahl], vii, 154 pp.
- First Drafts: Eyewitness Accounts from Canada's Past (Toronto: Thomas Allen Publishers, 2002) [with J.L. Granatstein], 486 pp.
- Canada Among Nations 2002: A Fading Power (Don Mills, Ontario: Oxford University Press, 2002) [with Maureen Appel Molot], xii, 299 pp.
- Canada Among Nations 2001: The Axworthy Legacy (Don Mills, Ontario: Oxford University Press, 2001) [with Fen Osler Hampson and Maureen Appel Molot], xiv, 235 pp.
- Pearson: the Unlikely Gladiator (Montreal and Kingston: McGill-Queen's University Press, 1999), x, 213 pp.
- A Country of Limitations: Canada and the World in 1939/Un pays dans la gêne: le Canada et le monde en 1939 (Ottawa: Canadian Committee for the History of the Second World War/Comité canadien D'Histoire de la Deuxieme Guerre mondiale, 1996) [with Robert Bothwell, Roger Sarty, and Claude Beauregard], 295 pp.
- Documents relatifs aux relations extérieures du Canada/Documents on Canadian External Relations, Volume XIII: 1947 (Ottawa: Affaires extérieures et Commerce extérieur Canada/External Affairs and International Trade Canada, 1993) [with Donald Page], xxxvii, 1654 pp.
- Making a Difference? Canada's Foreign Policy in a Changing World Order (Toronto: Lester Publishing, 1992) [with John English], xx, 236 pp. French edition: La politique étrangere canadienne dans un ordre international en mutation: une volonté de se démarquer? (Québec: Centre Québécois des Relations internationales, Université Laval, 1992), 338 pp. Chinese edition. (Beijing: The Social Science Publishing House, 2002), 267 pp.
- Partners Nevertheless: Canadian‑American Relations in the Twentieth Century (Toronto: Copp Clark Pitman, 1989), 322 pp.
- Nearly Neighbours: Canada and the Soviet Union from Cold War to Détente and Beyond (Kingston: Frye Publishers, 1989) [with J. L. Black], xii, 174 pp.
- On Guard for Thee: War, Ethnicity, and the Canadian State, 1939‑1945 (Ottawa: Canadian Committee for the History of the Second World War, 1988) [with B. Kordan and L. Luciuk], xx, 282 pp.
- The Official History of the Royal Canadian Air Force, Volume II: The Creation of a National Air Force (Toronto: University of Toronto Press, 1986) [by W. A. B. Douglas], xix, 797 pp. Winner of the 1988 C. P. Stacey Award.
- The First: Essays in Honour of Nicholas Mansergh (London: Frank Cass, 1980) [with P.G. Wigley], 192 pp.
- A Foremost Nation: Canadian Foreign Policy and a Changing World (Toronto: McClelland and Stewart, 1977) [with Garth Stevenson], 296 pp.
- The In‑Between Time: Canadian External Policy in the 1930s (Toronto: Copp Clark, 1974) [with Robert Bothwell], 224 pp.

== Dictionary of Canadian Biography ==
- Cathcart, Charles Murray, 2nd Earl Cathcart [with O.A. Cooke]
- Jackson, Sir Richard Downes [with O.A. Cooke]
