= Strategic bombing =

Systematic aerial attacks to destroy infrastructure and morale

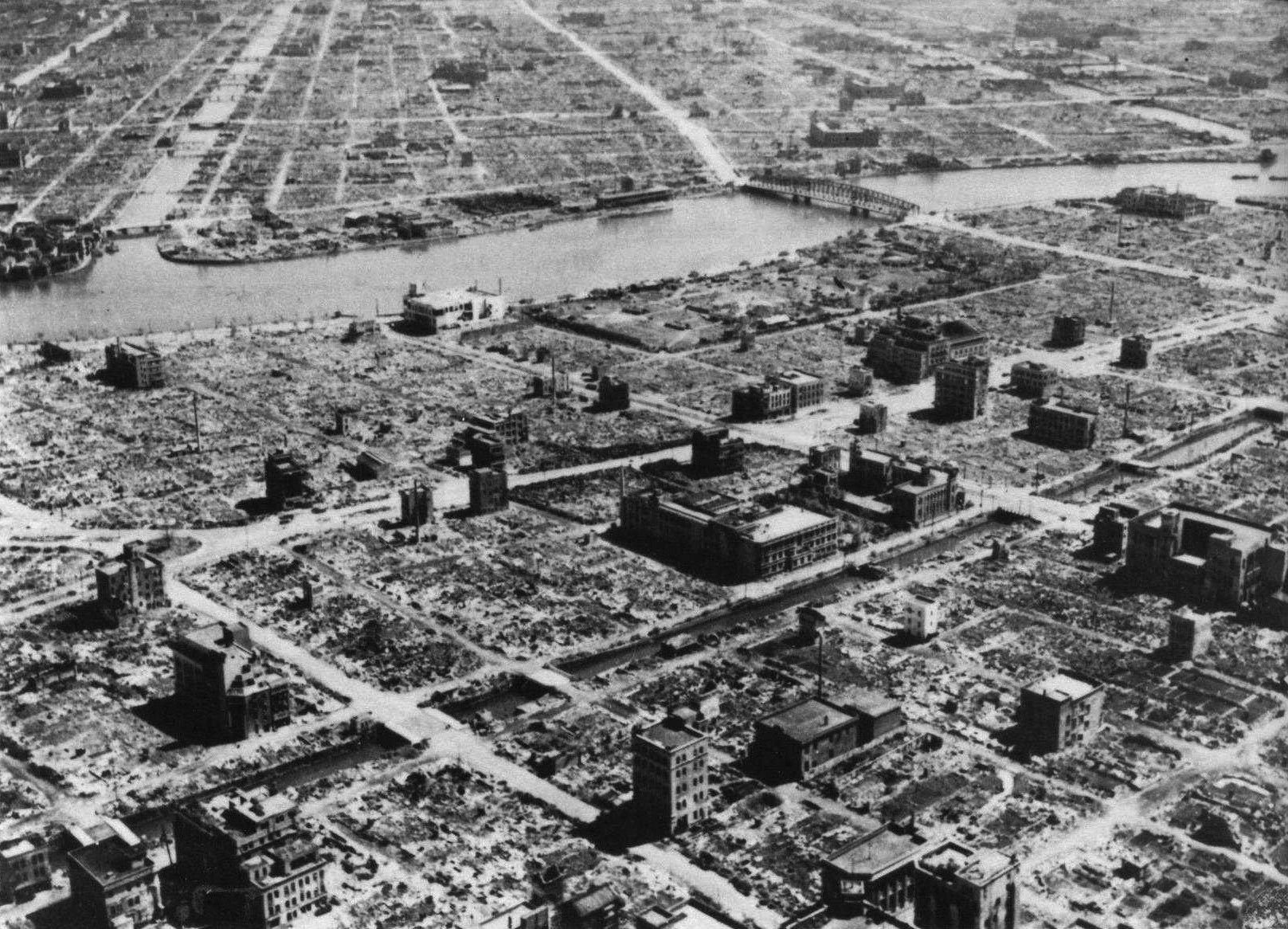
Tokyo after the massive firebombing attack on the night of March 9–10, 1945, the single most destructive raid in military aviation history. The Tokyo firebombing cut the city's industrial productivity by half and killed around 100,000 civilians.

Strategic bombing is a systematically organized and executed military attack from the air which can utilize strategic bombers, long- or medium-range missiles, or nuclear-armed fighter-bomber aircraft to attack targets deemed vital to the enemy's war-making capability. It is a military strategy used in total war with the goal of defeating the enemy by destroying its morale, its economic ability to produce and transport materiel to the theaters of military operations, or both. The term terror bombing is used to describe the strategic bombing of civilian targets without military value, in the hope of damaging an enemy's morale.

One of the strategies of war is to demoralize the enemy so that peace or surrender becomes preferable to continuing the conflict. Strategic bombing has been used to this end. The phrase "terror bombing" entered the English lexicon towards the end of World War II and many strategic bombing campaigns and individual raids have been described as terror bombing by commentators and historians. Because the term has pejorative connotations, some, including the Allies of World War II, have preferred to use euphemisms such as "morale bombings".

The theoretical distinction between tactical and strategic air warfare was developed between the two world wars. Some leading theorists of strategic air warfare during this period were the Italian Giulio Douhet, the Trenchard school in the United Kingdom, and General Billy Mitchell in the United States. These theorists were influential, both on the military justification for an independent air force (such as the Royal Air Force) and in influencing political thoughts on a future war as exemplified by Stanley Baldwin's 1932 comment that the bomber will always get through.

== Enemy morale ==
One of the aims of war is to demoralize the enemy; facing continual death and destruction may make the prospect of peace or surrender preferable. The proponents of strategic bombing between the world wars, such as General Douhet, expected that direct attacks upon an enemy country's cities by strategic bombers would lead to a rapid collapse of civilian morale so that political pressure to sue for peace would lead to a rapid conclusion. When such attacks were tried in the 1930s—in the Spanish Civil War and the Second Sino-Japanese War—they were ineffective. Commentators observed the failures and some air forces, such as the Luftwaffe, concentrated their efforts upon direct support of the troops. As World War II progressed, the focus by the Allies on the enemy's morale was modified. Observation of the effect of the Blitz on British industrial war production showed that it was difficult to put factories out of action by bombing, but, in comparison, destroying the housing of the workforce had a much more disruptive effect. Morale collapse was expected to affect war industries, rather than, as in the pre-war theories, initiating political pressure for war leaders to sue for peace.

== The term "terror bombing" ==
Terror bombing is a term used for aerial attacks planned to weaken or break enemy morale. Use of the term to refer to aerial attacks implies the attacks are criminal according to the law of war, or if within the laws of war are nevertheless a moral crime. According to John Algeo in Fifty Years among the New Words: A Dictionary of Neologisms 1941–1991, the first recorded usage of "Terror bombing" in a United States publication was in a Reader's Digest article dated June 1941, a finding confirmed by the Oxford English Dictionary.

Aerial attacks described as terror bombing are often long range strategic bombing raids, although attacks which result in the deaths of civilians may also be described as such, or if the attacks involve fighters strafing, they may be labelled "terror attacks".

German propaganda minister Joseph Goebbels and other high-ranking officials of Nazi Germany frequently described attacks by the Royal Air Force (RAF) and the United States Army Air Forces (USAAF) during their strategic bombing campaigns as Terrorangriffe—terror attacks. (Note: Goebbels used several terms including Terrorangriffe ("terror raids") or Terrorhandlungen ("terrorist activities")… Terrorflieger ("terror flyers" or "terrorist airman"). No one in Germany used such terminology in connection with German bombing raids against cities in England.) (Note: …Western Allies… were "air pirates." "They are murderers!" screamed the headlines of an article emanating from Berlin on February 22. Not only did the writer denounce the allied "terror bombing", but he also stressed the "special joy" that the "Anglo-American air gangsters" took in the murder of innocent German civilians…) The Allied governments usually described their bombing of cities with euphemisms such as area bombing (RAF). The USAAF referred to their daylight raids as precision bombing though weather conditions over Europe usually made attempts at accuracy void, and for most of World War II the Allied news media did the same. However, at a SHAEF press conference on 16 February 1945, two days after the bombing of Dresden, British Air Commodore Colin McKay Grierson replied to a question by one of the journalists that the primary target of the bombing had been on communications to prevent the Germans from moving military supplies and to stop movement in all directions if possible. He then added in an offhand remark that the raid also helped destroy "what is left of German morale." Howard Cowan, an Associated Press war correspondent, filed a story about the Dresden raid. The military press censor at SHAEF made a mistake and allowed the Cowan cable to go out starting with "Allied air bosses have made the long awaited decision to adopt deliberate terror bombing of great German population centers as a ruthless expedient to hasten Hitler's doom." There were follow-up newspaper editorials on the issue and a longtime opponent of strategic bombing, Richard Stokes MP, asked questions in the House of Commons on 6 March.

The controversy stirred up by the Cowan news report reached the highest levels of the British Government when on 28 March 1945 the Prime Minister, Winston Churchill, sent a memo by telegram to General Ismay for the British Chiefs of Staff and the Chief of the Air Staff in which he started with the sentence "It seems to me that the moment has come when the question of bombing of German cities simply for the sake of increasing the terror, though under other pretexts, should be reviewed…" Under pressure from the Chiefs of Staff and in response to the views expressed by Chief of the Air Staff Sir Charles Portal, and the head of Bomber Command, Arthur "Bomber" Harris, among others, Churchill withdrew his memo and issued a new one. This was completed on 1 April 1945 and started instead with the usual euphemism used when referring to strategic bombing: "It seems to me that the moment has come when the question of the so called 'area-bombing' of German cities should be reviewed from the point of view of our own interests…".

Many strategic bombing campaigns and individual raids of aerial warfare have been described as "terror bombing" by commentators and historians since the end of World War II, but because the term has pejorative connotations, others have denied that such bombing campaigns and raids are examples of "terror bombing".

== Defensive measures ==
Defensive measures against air raids include:

- attempting to shoot down attackers using fighter aircraft and anti-aircraft guns or surface-to-air missiles
- the use of air raid shelters to protect the population
- air raid sirens
- setting up civil defence organizations with air raid wardens, firewatchers, rescue and recovery personnel, firefighting crews, and demolition and repair teams to rectify damage
- Blackouts – extinguishing all lights at night to make bombing less accurate
- Dispersal of war-critical factories to areas difficult for bombers to reach
- Duplication of war-critical manufacturing to "shadow factories"
- Building factories in tunnels or other underground locations that are protected from bombs
- Setting up decoy targets in rural areas, mimicking an urban area with fires intended to look like the initial effects of a raid

== History and origins ==
=== World War I ===
Strategic bombing was used in World War I, though it was not understood in its present form. The first aerial bombing of a city was on 6 August 1914 when the German Army Zeppelin Z VI bombed, with artillery shells, the Belgian city of Liège, killing nine civilians. The second attack was on the night of 24–25 August 1914, when eight bombs were dropped from a German airship onto the Belgian city of Antwerp.

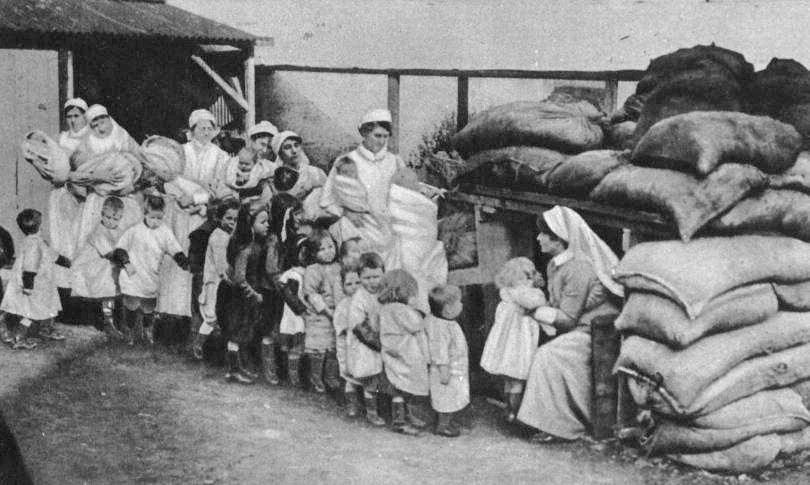
A 1918 Air Raid rehearsal, evacuating children from a hospital

The first effective strategic bombing was pioneered by the Royal Naval Air Service (RNAS) in 1914. The mission was to attack the Zeppelin production lines and their sheds at Cologne (Köln) and Düsseldorf. Led by Charles Rumney Samson, the force of four aircraft inflicted minor damage on the sheds. The raid was repeated a month later with slightly more success. Within a year or so, specialized aircraft and dedicated bomber squadrons were in service on both sides. These were generally used for tactical bombing; the aim was that of directly harming enemy troops, strongpoints, or equipment, usually within a relatively small distance of the front line. Eventually, attention turned to the possibility of causing indirect harm to the enemy by systematically attacking vital rear-area resources.

The most well known attacks were those done by Zeppelins over England through the course of the war. The first aerial bombardment of English civilians was on January 19, 1915, when two Zeppelins dropped 24 fifty-kilogram (110-pound) high-explosive bombs and ineffective three-kilogram incendiaries on the Eastern England towns of Great Yarmouth, Sheringham, King's Lynn, and the surrounding villages. In all, four people were killed and sixteen injured, and monetary damage was estimated at £7,740 (about US$36,000 at the time). German airships also bombed on other fronts, for example in January 1915 on Liepāja in Latvia.

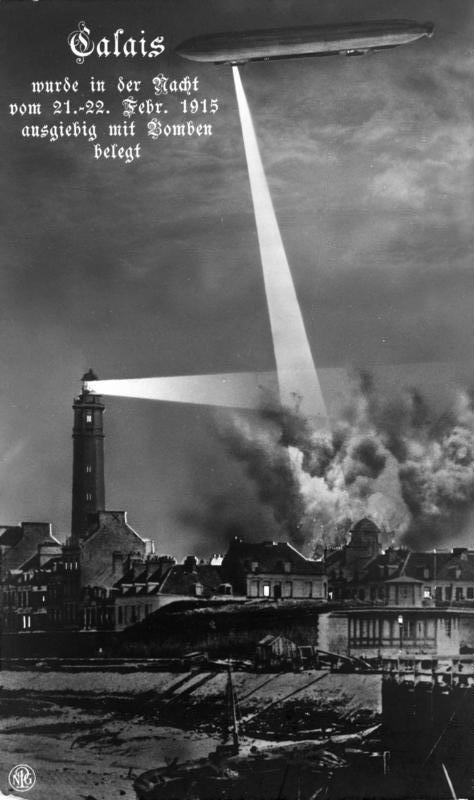
German airship bombing Calais on the night of 21–22 February 1915

In 1915 there were 19 more raids, in which 37 tons of bombs were dropped, killing 181 people and injuring 455. Raids continued in 1916. London was accidentally bombed in May, and in July the Kaiser allowed directed raids against urban centers. There were 23 airship raids in 1916, in which 125 tons of ordnance were dropped, killing 293 people and injuring 691. Gradually British air defenses improved. In 1917 and 1918, there were only 11 Zeppelin raids against England, and the final raid occurred on August 5, 1918, which resulted in the death of KK Peter Strasser, commander of the German Naval Airship Department.

By the end of the war, 51 raids had been undertaken, in which 5,806 bombs were dropped, killing 557 people and injuring 1,358. These raids caused only minor hampering of wartime production, by later standards. A much greater impact was the diversion of twelve aircraft squadrons, many guns, and over 10,000 men to air defenses. The raids generated a wave of hysteria, partially caused by media. This revealed the tactic's potential as a weapon that was of use for propagandists on both sides. The late Zeppelin raids were complemented by the Gotha bomber, which was the first heavier-than-air bomber to be used for strategic bombing.

The French army on June 15, 1915, attacked the German town of Karlsruhe, killing 29 civilians and wounding 58. Further raids followed until the Armistice in 1918. In a raid in the afternoon of June 22, 1916, the pilots used outdated maps and bombed the location of the abandoned railway station, where a circus tent was placed, killing 120 persons, most of them children.

The British also stepped up their strategic bombing campaign. In late 1915, the order was given for attacks on German industrial targets, and the 41st Wing was formed from units of the RNAS and Royal Flying Corps. The RNAS took to the strategic bombing in a bigger way than the RFC, who were focused on supporting the infantry actions of the Western Front. At first, the RNAS attacked the German submarines in their moorings and then steelworks further in targeting the origin of the submarines themselves.

In early 1918 they operated their "round the clock" bombing raid, with lighter bombers attacking the town of Trier by day and large HP O/400s attacking by night. The Independent Force, an expanded bombing group, and the first independent strategic bombing force, was created in April 1918. By the end of the war, the force had aircraft that could reach Berlin, but these were never used.

=== Interwar period ===
Following the war, the concept of strategic bombing developed. Calculations of the number of dead to the weight of bombs would have a profound effect on the attitudes of the British authorities and population in the interwar years. As bombers became larger, it was fully expected that deaths would dramatically increase. The fear of aerial attack on such a scale was one of the fundamental driving forces of the appeasement of Nazi Germany in the 1930s.

These early developments of aerial warfare led to two distinct branches in the writings of air warfare theorists: tactical air warfare and strategic air warfare. Tactical air warfare was developed as part of a combined-arms attack which would be developed to a significant degree by Germany, and which contributed much to the success of the Wehrmacht during the first four years (1939–42) of World War II. The Luftwaffe became a major element of the German blitzkrieg.

Some leading theorists of strategic air warfare, namely strategic bombing during this period were the Italian Giulio Douhet, the Trenchard school in Great Britain, and General Billy Mitchell in the United States. These theorists thought that aerial bombardment of the enemy's homeland would be an important part of future wars. Not only would such attacks weaken the enemy by destroying important military infrastructure, they would also break the morale of the civilian population, forcing their government to capitulate. Although area bombing theorists acknowledged that measures could be taken to defend against bombers—using fighter planes and anti-aircraft artillery—the maxim of the times remained "the bomber will always get through". These theorists for strategic bombing argued that it would be necessary to develop a fleet of strategic bombers during peacetime, both to deter any potential enemy, and also in the case of a war, to be able to deliver devastating attacks on the enemy industries and cities while suffering from relatively few friendly casualties before victory was achieved.

In the period between the two world wars, military thinkers from several nations advocated strategic bombing as the logical and obvious way to employ aircraft. Domestic political considerations saw to it that the British worked harder on the concept than most. The British Royal Flying Corps and Royal Naval Air Service of the Great War had been merged in 1918 to create a separate air force, which spent much of the following two decades fighting for survival in an environment of severe government spending constraints.

In Italy, the airpower prophet General Giulio Douhet asserted the basic principle of strategic bombing was the offensive, and there was no defense against carpet bombing and poison gas attacks. The seeds of Douhet's apocalyptic predictions found fertile soil in France, Germany, and the United States, where excerpts from his book The Command of the Air (1921) were published. These visions of cities laid waste by bombing also gripped the popular imagination and found expression in novels such as Douhet's The War of 19-- (1930) and H. G. Wells's The Shape of Things to Come (1933) (filmed by Alexander Korda as Things to Come (1936)).

Douhet's proposals were hugely influential among air force enthusiasts, arguing as they did that the bombing air arm was the most important, powerful, and invulnerable part of any military. He envisaged future wars as lasting a matter of a few weeks. While each opposing Army and Navy fought an inglorious holding campaign, the respective Air Forces would dismantle their enemies' country, and if one side did not rapidly surrender, both would be so weak after the first few days that the war would effectively cease. Fighter aircraft would be relegated to spotting patrols but would be essentially powerless to resist the mighty bombers. In support of this theory, he argued for targeting of the civilian population as much as any military target, since a nation's morale was as important a resource as its weapons. Paradoxically, he suggested that this would actually reduce total casualties, since "The time would soon come when to put an end to horror and suffering, the people themselves, driven by the instinct of self-preservation, would rise up and demand an end to the war…". As a result of Douhet's proposals, air forces allocated greater resources to their bomber squadrons than to their fighters, and the 'dashing young pilots' promoted in the propaganda of the time were invariably bomber pilots.

Royal Air Force leaders, in particular Air Chief Marshal Hugh Trenchard, believed the key to retaining their independence from the senior services was to lay stress on what they saw as the unique ability of a modern air force to win wars by unaided strategic bombing. As the speed and altitude of bombers increased in proportion to fighter aircraft, the prevailing strategic understanding became "the bomber will always get through". Although anti-aircraft guns and fighter aircraft had proved effective in the Great War, it was accepted there was little warring nations could do to prevent massive civilian casualties from strategic bombing. High civilian morale and retaliation in kind were seen as the only answers—a later generation would revisit this, as Mutual Assured Destruction.

During the interwar period (1919–1939), the use of aerial bombing was developed as part of British foreign policy in its colonies, with Hugh Trenchard as its leading proponent, Sir Charles Portal, Sir Arthur Harris, and Sidney Bufton. The Trenchard School theories were successfully put into action in Mesopotamia (modern-day Iraq) where RAF bombers used high-explosive bombs and strafing runs against Arab forces. The techniques of so-called "Air Control" also included target marking and locating, as well as formation flying. Arthur Harris, a young RAF squadron commander (later nicknamed "Bomber"), reported after a mission in 1924, "The Arab and Kurd now know what real bombing means, in casualties and damage. They know that within 45 minutes a full-sized village can be practically wiped out and a third of its inhabitants killed or injured".

On an official level, RAF directives stressed:

In these attacks, endeavour should be made to spare the women and children as far as possible, and for this purpose, a warning should be given, whenever practicable. It would be wrong even at this stage to think that airpower was simply seen as a tool for rapid retribution.

A statement clearly pointed out that the ability of aircraft to inflict punishment could be open to abuse:

Their power to cover great distances at high speed, their instant readiness for action, their independence (within the detachment radius) of communications, their indifference to obstacles, and the unlikelihood of casualties to air personnel combine to encourage their use offensively more often than the occasion warrants.

In British strikes over Yemen in over a six-month period, sixty tons of bombs were dropped in over 1,200 cumulative flying hours. By August 1928, total losses in ground fighting and air attack, on the Yemeni side, were 65 killed or wounded (one RAF pilot was killed and one airman wounded). Between the wars the RAF conducted 26 separate air operations within the Aden Protectorate. The majority were conducted in response to persistent banditry or to restore the Government's authority. Excluding operations against Yemeni forces—which had effectively ceased by 1934—a total of twelve deaths were attributed to air attacks conducted between 1919 and 1939. Bombing as a military strategy proved to be an effective and efficient way for the British to police their Middle East protectorates in the 1920s. Fewer men were required as compared to ground forces.

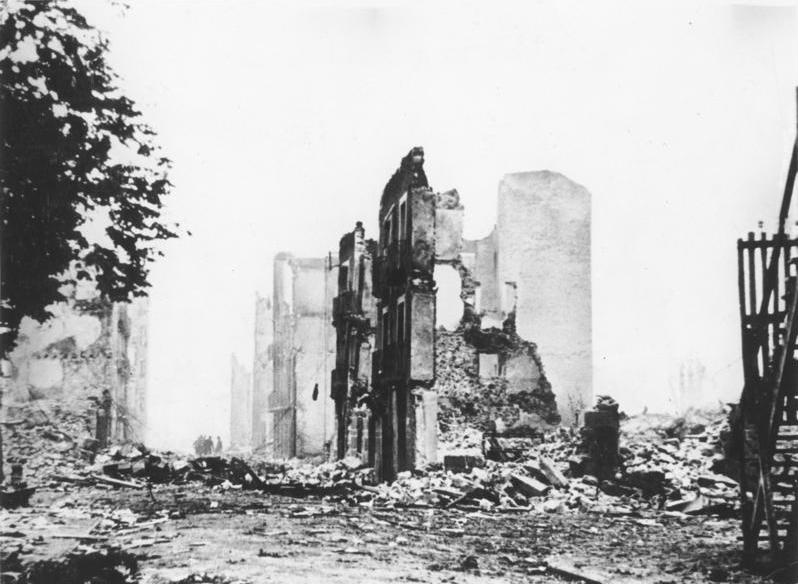
Ruins of Guernica (1937)

Pre-war planners, on the whole, vastly overestimated the damage bombers could do, and underestimated the resilience of civilian populations. Jingoistic national pride played a major role: for example, at a time when Germany was still disarmed and France was Britain's only European rival, Trenchard boasted, "the French in a bombing duel would probably squeal before we did". At the time, the expectation was any new war would be brief and very brutal. Chamberlain believed the German air force could devastate vulnerable British cities and military bases. This type of expectation would justify the appeasement of Hitler in the late 1930s.

During the Spanish Civil War, the bombing of Guernica by German aviators including the Condor Legion, under Nationalist command, resulted in its near destruction. Casualties were estimated to be between 500 and 1500. Though this figure was relatively small, aerial bombers and their weaponry were continually improving—already suggesting the devastation that was to come in the near future. Yet the theory that "the bomber will always get through" started to appear doubtful, as stated by the U.S. Attaché in 1937, "The peacetime theory of the complete invulnerability of the modern type of bombardment airplane no longer holds. The increased speeds of both the bombardment and pursuit plane have worked in favor of the pursuit ... The flying fortress died in Spain."

Large scale bombing of the civilian population, thought to be demoralizing to the enemy, seemed to have the opposite effect. E. B. Strauss surmised, "Observers state that one of the most remarkable effects of the bombing of open towns in Government Spain had been the welding together into a formidable fighting force of groups of political factions who were previously at each other's throats...", a sentiment with which Hitler's Luftwaffe, supporting the Spanish Nationalists, generally agreed.

=== World War II ===
In terms of scale, the strategic bombing conducted in World War II was unlike any before. The bombing campaigns then conducted over Europe and Asia could involve aircraft dropping thousands of tons of conventional bombs or, as happened twice in Japan in 1945, devastating much of a city all at once with an atomic bomb.

Area bombardment came to prominence during World War II, with the use by attacking forces of large numbers of unguided gravity bombs, often mixed with a high proportion of incendiary devices to strike the target region indiscriminately: to kill war workers, to destroy materiel, and to demoralize the enemy. In high-enough concentration, such bombing could start a destructive firestorm. Often, high-explosive delay-action bombs could kill or intimidate people fighting the fires initially caused by the incendiary bombs.

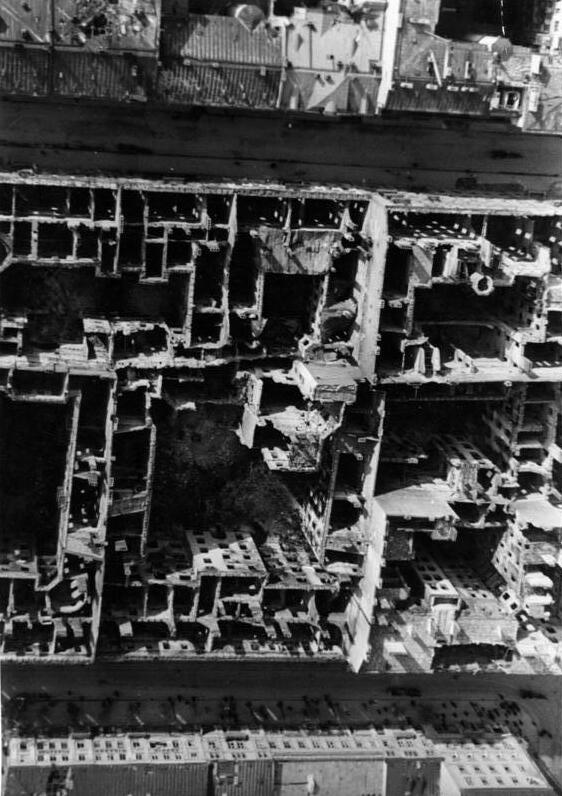
Destroyed city block in Warsaw after the German Luftwaffe bombing of the city, September 1939

(During WWII, such results required multiple aircraft, often returning to the target in waves. Whereas nowadays, one large bomber or missile could cause the same effect on a small area [a town or an airfield, for example] by releasing a relatively-large number of smaller bombs.)

Strategic bombing campaigns were conducted in Europe and Asia. The Germans and Japanese mostly used smaller twin-engined bombers with a typical payload of less than 5,000 pounds (2,300 kg); they did not manufacture larger aircraft to any significant extent. By comparison, the British and American militaries (which at first used similarly sized bombers early in the war), soon developed significantly-larger strategic bombers with four engines. The increased payloads of these big airplanes ranged from 4,000 lb (1,800 kg) for the B-17 Flying Fortress on long-range missions, to 8,000 lb (3,600 kg) for the B-24 Liberator, 14,000 lb (6,400 kg) for the Avro Lancaster, and 20,000 lb (9,000 kg) B-29 Superfortress, (also with some specialized Allied aircraft, such as the modified Special B Avro Lancaster, able to carry a gigantic 22,000 lb (10,000 kg) Grand Slam).

During the first year of the war in Europe, strategic bombing was developed through "trial-and-error." The Luftwaffe had been attacking both civilian and military targets from the first day of the war, when Germany invaded Poland on 1 September 1939. A strategic-bombing campaign was launched by the Germans as a precursor to the invasion of the United Kingdom to force the RAF to engage the Luftwaffe and so to be destroyed either on the ground or in the air. That tactic failed, and the RAF began bombing German cities on 11 May 1940. After the Battle of Britain, the Germans launched their night time Blitz hoping to break British morale and to have the British be cowed into making peace.

At first the Luftwaffe raids took place in daylight, but changed to night bombing attacks when losses became unsustainable. The RAF, who had preferred precision bombing, also switched to night bombing, also due to excessive losses. Before the Rotterdam Blitz on 14 May 1940 the British restricted themselves to tactical bombing west of the Rhine and naval installations. The day after the Rotterdam Blitz a new directive was issued to the RAF to attack targets in the Ruhr, including oil plants and other civilian industrial targets which aided the German war effort, such as blast furnaces that at night were self-illuminating. After the Butt Report (released in September 1941) proved the inadequacy of RAF Bomber Command training methods and equipment, the RAF adopted an area-attack strategy, by which it hoped to impede Germany's war production, her powers of resistance (by destroying resources and forcing Germany to divert resources from her front lines to defend her air space), and her morale. The RAF dramatically improved its navigation so that on average its bombs hit closer to target. Accuracy never exceeded a 3 mi (4.8 km) radius from point of aim in any case.

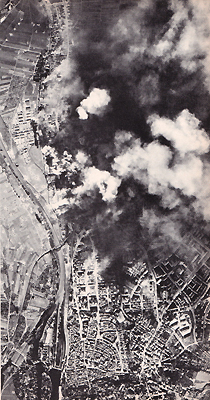
1943 USAAF raid on ball bearing works at Schweinfurt, Germany

The United States Army Air Forces adopted a policy of daylight precision bombing for greater accuracy as, for example, during the Schweinfurt raids. That doctrine, based on the erroneous supposition that bombers could adequately defend themselves against air attack, entailed much higher American losses until long-range fighter escorts (e.g. the Mustang) became available. Conditions in the European theatre made it very difficult to achieve the accuracy achieved using the top-secret Norden optical bombsight in the clear skies over the desert bombing ranges of Nevada and California. Raids over Europe commonly took place in conditions of very poor visibility, with targets partly or wholly obscured by thick cloud, smokescreens, or smoke from fires started by previous raids. As a result, bomb loads were regularly dropped "blind" using dead-reckoning methods little different from those used by the RAF night bombers. In addition, only the leading bomber in a formation actually utilized the Norden sight, the rest of the formation dropping their bombs only when they saw the lead aircraft's bombload falling away. Since even a very tight bomber formation could cover a vast area, the scatter of bombs was likely to be considerable. Add to these difficulties the disruptive effects of increasingly accurate anti-aircraft fire and head-on attacks by fighter aircraft and the theoretical accuracy of daylight bombing was often hard to achieve. Accuracy, described as "pinpoint", never exceeded the best British average of about a 3 mi (4.8 km) radius from point of aim in any case. Postwar German engineers considered the bombing of railways, trains, canals, and roads more harmful to production than attacks on factories themselves, Sir Roy Fedden (in his report on a postwar British scientific intelligence mission) calling it "fatal" and saying it reduced aero-engine production by two thirds (from a maximum output of 5,000 to 7,000 a month).

Strategic bombing was a way of taking the war into Europe while Allied ground forces were unable to do so. Between them, Allied air forces claimed to be able to bomb "around the clock". In fact, few targets were ever hit by British and American forces the same day, the strategic isolation of Normandy on D-Day and the bombing of Dresden in February 1945 being exceptions rather than the rule. There were generally no coordinated plans for the around-the-clock bombing of any target.

In some cases, single missions have been considered to constitute strategic bombing. The bombing of Peenemünde was such an event, as was the bombing of the Ruhr dams. The Peenemünde mission delayed Nazi Germany's V-2 program enough that it did not become a major factor in the outcome of the war.

Soviet Air Forces conducted strategic bombings of Helsinki, the capital of Finland, between 1939 and 1944, with Finland being subjected to a number of bombing campaigns by the USSR in that period. The largest were three raids in February 1944, which have been called The Great Raids Against Helsinki. The Finnish Air Force responded to the air raids with a series of night infiltration bombings of ADD airfields near Leningrad.

Strategic bombing in Europe never reached the decisive completeness the American campaign against Japan achieved, helped in part by the fragility of Japanese housing, which was particularly vulnerable to firebombing through the use of incendiary devices. The destruction of German infrastructure became apparent, but the Allied campaign against Germany only really succeeded when the Allies began targeting oil refineries and transportation in the last year of the war. At the same time, the strategic bombing of Germany was used as a morale booster for the Allies in the period before the land war resumed in Western Europe in June 1944.

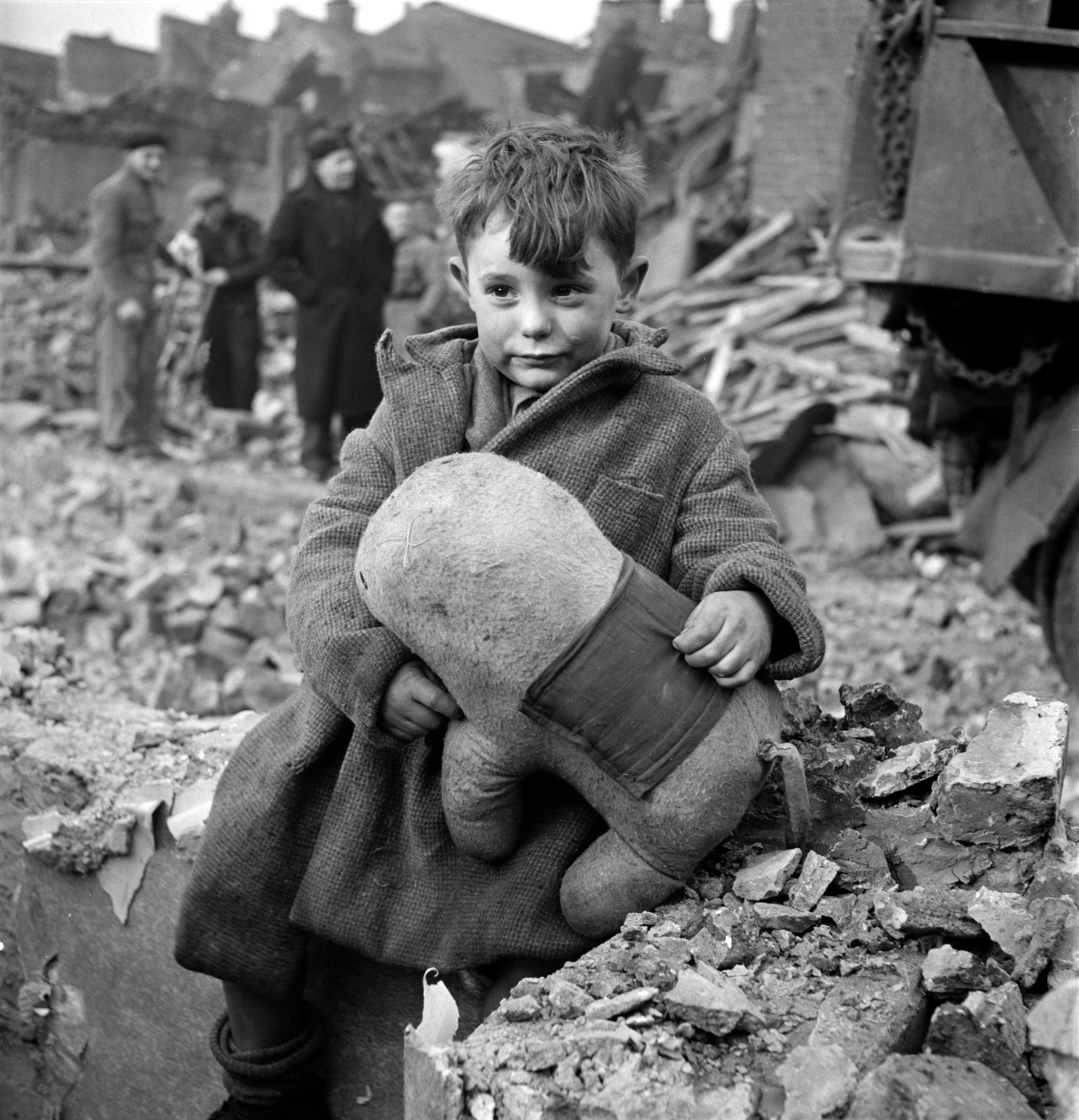
Child amid ruins following German aerial bombing of London, 1945

In the Asiatic-Pacific Theater, the Imperial Japanese Navy Air Service and the Imperial Japanese Army Air Service frequently used strategic bombing over Singaporean, Burmese, and Chinese cities such as Shanghai, Guangzhou, Nanjing, Chongqing, Singapore, and Rangoon. However, the Japanese military in most places advanced quickly enough that a strategic bombing campaign was unnecessary, and the Japanese aircraft industry was incapable of producing truly strategic bombers in any event. In those places where it was required, the smaller Japanese bombers (in comparison to British and American types) did not carry a bombload sufficient to inflict the sort of damage regularly occurring at that point in the war in Europe, or later in Japan.

The development of the B-29 gave the United States a bomber with sufficient range to reach the Japanese home islands from the safety of American bases in the Pacific or western China. The capture of the Japanese island of Iwo Jima further enhanced the capabilities that the Americans possessed in their strategic bombing campaign. High-explosive and incendiary bombs were used against Japan to devastating effect, with greater indiscriminate loss of life in the firebombing of Tokyo on March 9–10, 1945 than was caused either by the Dresden mission, or the atomic bombs dropped on Hiroshima or Nagasaki. Unlike the USAAF's strategic bombing campaign in Europe, with its avowed (if unachievable) objective of precision bombing of strategic targets, the bombing of Japanese cities involved the deliberate targeting of residential zones from the outset. Bomb loads included very high proportions of incendiaries, with the intention of igniting the highly combustible wooden houses common in Japanese cities and thereby generating firestorms.

The final development of strategic bombing in World War II was the use of nuclear weapons. On August 6 and 9, 1945, the United States exploded nuclear bombs over Hiroshima and Nagasaki, killing 105,000 people and inflicting a psychological shock on the Japanese nation. On August 15, Emperor Hirohito announced the surrender of Japan, stating:

Moreover, the enemy has begun to employ a new and most cruel bomb, the power of which to do damage is indeed incalculable, taking the toll of many innocent lives. Should We continue to fight, it would not only result in an ultimate collapse and obliteration of the Japanese nation but also it would lead to the total extinction of human civilization. Such being the case, how are We to save the millions of Our subjects; or to atone Ourselves before the hallowed spirits of Our Imperial Ancestors? This is the reason why We have ordered the acceptance of the provisions of the Joint Declaration of the Powers.

=== Cold War ===
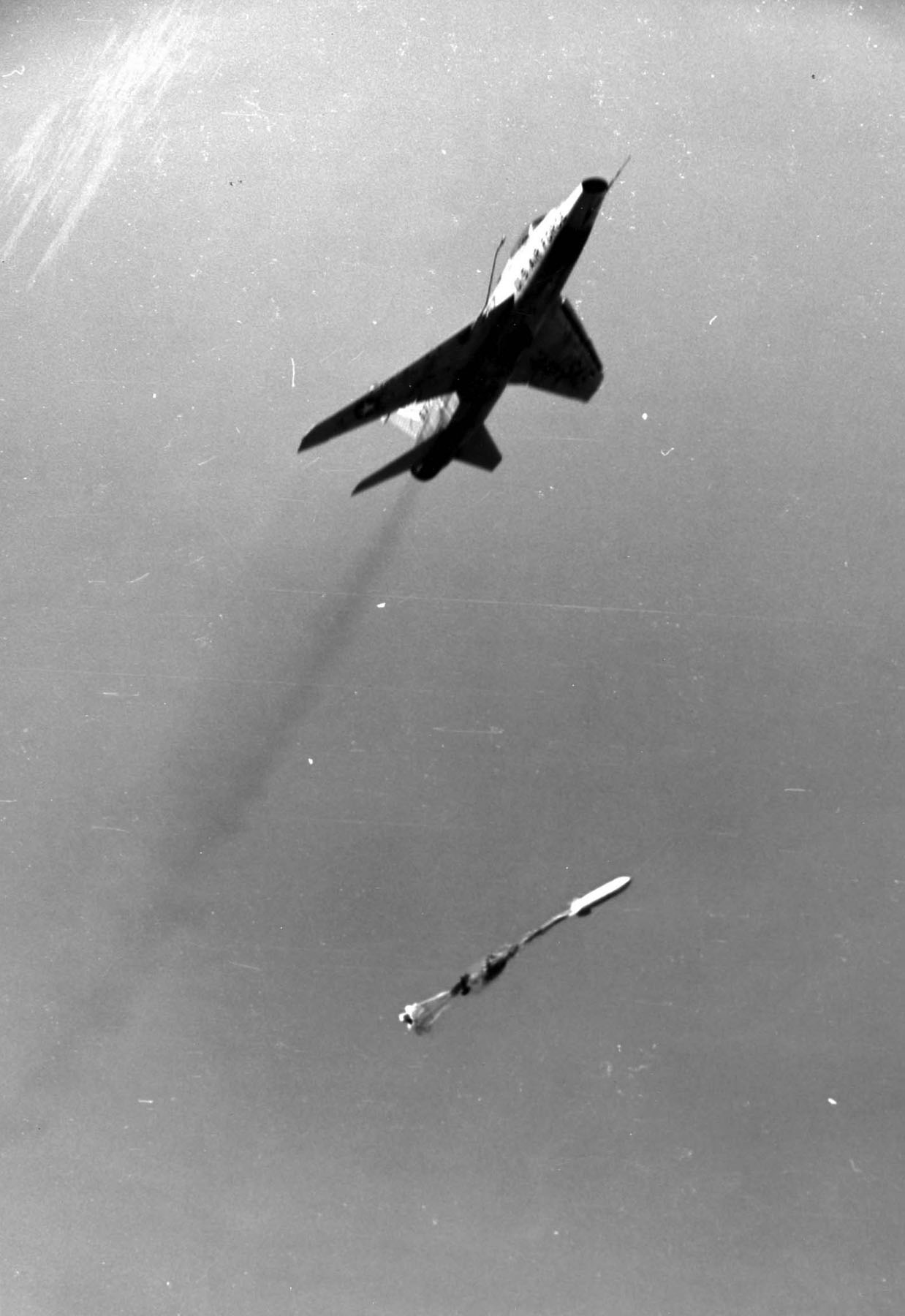
A U.S. Air Force F-100 Super Sabre practices a nuclear bombing run

Nuclear weapons defined strategic bombing during the Cold War. The age of the massive strategic bombing campaign had come to an end. It was replaced by more devastating attacks using improved targeting and weapons technology. Strategic bombing by the Great Powers also became politically indefensible. The political fallout resulting from the destruction being broadcast on the evening news ended more than one strategic bombing campaign.

==== Korean War ====
Strategic bombing during the Korean war was a huge part of the aerial warfare for the United States. It was widely used at targeting infrastructure and economic targets forcing the USSR and China to leverage more economically and materially in the supporting North Korean efforts. It was also consistently reliable for the US even amongst Chinese and USSR interference throughout the war.

While nuclear weapons were never used, at the outset of the war the US Strategic Air Command was ready with 9 B-29s from the 9th Bomb Wing acting as an atomic task force which were sent to Guam on standby duty.

The United States Air Force (USAF) at first conducted only tactical attacks against strategic targets. Because it was widely considered a limited war, the Truman Administration prohibited the USAF to bomb near the borders of China and the Soviet Union in fear of provoking the countries to enter into the war. Common targets were railroad yards, bridges, and airfields, seeking to disrupt supply lines and ability to produce materials for the war. The first notable strategic bombing was a bombing consisting of nine B-29s which bombed the Rising Sun oil refinery at Wonsan on July 6, 1950, followed by a bombing of a chemical plant at Hungnam. Later that month on July 30 a Chosen nitrogen explosives factory at Hungnam was bombed destroying the largest of the Konan Industrial-Chemical Complex.

The Chinese intervention in the war in November 1950 changed the aerial bombing policy dramatically. In response to the Chinese intervention, the USAF carried out an intensive bombing campaign against North Korea to demoralize the North Koreans and inflict as much economic cost to North Korea in order to reduce their ability to wage war. The largest incendiary raid of the war had 70 B-29s drop firebombs on the town of Sinuiju and was a representation for the change in aerial bombing policy. The extensive bombing raids on North Korea continued until the armistice agreement was signed between communist and UN forces on July 27, 1953.

==== Vietnam War ====
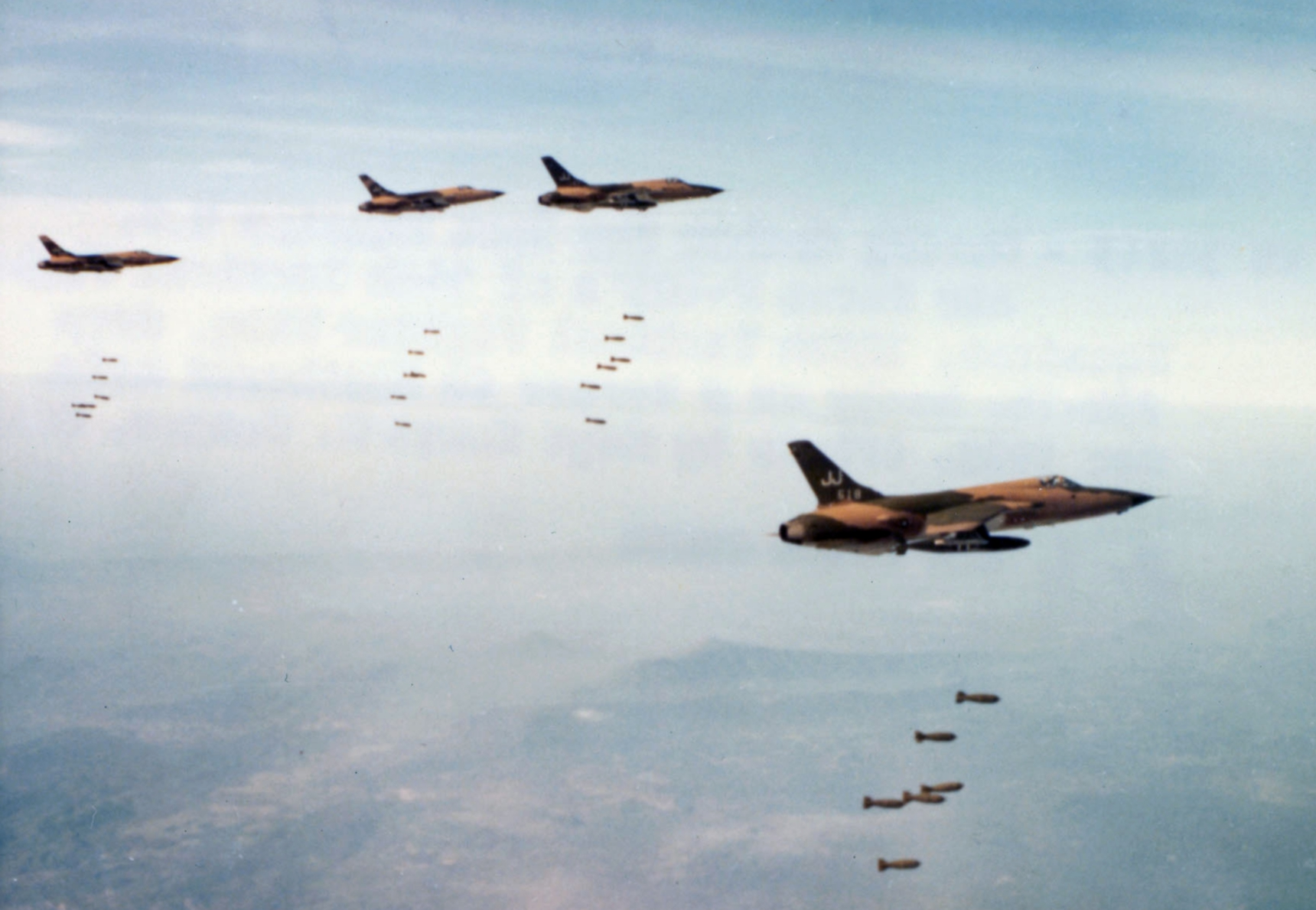
U.S. Air Force F-105D Thunderchief fighters during Operation Rolling Thunder over North Vietnam

In the Vietnam War, the strategic bombing of North Vietnam in Operation Rolling Thunder could have been more extensive, but fear by the Johnson Administration of the entry of China into the war led to restrictions on the selection of targets, as well as only a gradual escalation of intensity.

The aim of the bombing campaign was to demoralize the North Vietnamese, damage their economy, and reduce their capacity to support the war in the hope that they would negotiate for peace, but it failed to have those effects. The Nixon Administration continued this sort of limited strategic bombing for most of the war but pivoted towards the ending of it. Operation Linebacker campaigns were much heavier bombing campaigns taking off many of the restrictions that were placed initially and began flying B-52 bombers. Images such as that of Kim Phuc Phan Thi (although this incident was the result of close air support rather than strategic bombing) disturbed the American public enough to demand a stop to the campaign.

Due to this, and the ineffectiveness of carpet bombing (partly because of a lack of identifiable targets), new precision weapons were developed. The new weapons allowed more effective and efficient bombing with reduced civilian casualties. High civilian casualties had always been the hallmark of strategic bombing, but later in the Cold War, this began to change.

Laos was also bombed heavily during the Vietnam War. While originally denied by the US government Laos became the most heavily bombed country per capita as the result of more than 2 million tons of ordinance dropped. Laos contained heavy supply lines for communist troops and the US sought to destroy them safely before they could enter Vietnam and be used against American troops. The first of many targets within the country was the "Plain of Jars" which was known as a logistical center for military forces to gather and is the main air base in Urdon. While there were two different aerial operations held within Laos, Operation Steel Tiger is the one that focused on the Strategic Bombing of supporting civilian infrastructure that could aid in the up-and-coming communist regime and was assisting in getting rebels to aid the North Vietnamese military.

Strategic bombing was entering a new phase of high-intensity attacks, specifically targeting factories that take years to build and enormous investment capital. These new high-intensity and focused attacks made extra use of newer and modern fighter aircraft such as the McDonnell Douglas F-4 Phantom II enabling less reliance on heavier, more vulnerable bombers.

==== Iran-Iraq War ====
After the fall of 1981, in the context of the Iranian ground counter-offensives, the USSR lifted their arms embargo and massively rearmed Iraq, including with 40 MiG-25s, which enabled the Iraqi air force to challenge Iran's F-14s in their air space. Iraq used Tu-22 Blinder and Tu-16 Badger strategic bombers to carry out long-range high-speed raids on Iranian cities, including Tehran. Fighter-bombers such as the MiG-25 Foxbat and Su-22 Fitter were used against smaller or shorter range targets, as well as escorting the strategic bombers. Civilian and industrial targets were hit by the raids, and each successful raid inflicted economic damage from regular strategic bombing. Iran also launched several retaliatory air raids on Iraq, while primarily shelling border cities such as Basra. Iran also bought some Scud missiles from Libya and launched them against Baghdad. These too inflicted damage upon Iraq.

=== Post–Cold War ===
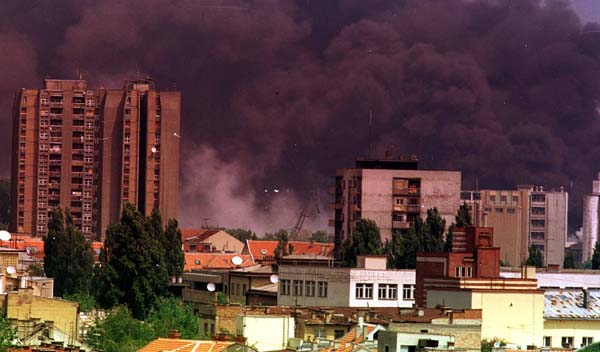
Smoke in Novi Sad, Serbia after NATO bombardment

Strategic bombing in the post–Cold War era is defined by American advances in and the use of smart munitions. The developments in guided munitions meant that the Coalition forces in the First Gulf War were able to use them, although the majority—93%—of bombs dropped in that conflict were still conventional, unguided bombs. More frequently in the Kosovo War, and the 2003 invasion of Iraq, strategic bombing campaigns were notable for the heavy use of precision weaponry by those countries that possessed them. Although bombing campaigns were still strategic in their aims, the widespread area bombing tactics of World War II had mostly disappeared. This led to significantly fewer civilian casualties associated with previous bombing campaigns, though it has not brought about a complete end to civilian deaths or collateral property damage.

Additionally, strategic bombing via smart munitions is now possible through the use of aircraft that have been considered traditionally tactical in nature such as the F-16 Fighting Falcon or F-15E Strike Eagle, which had been used during Operation Desert Storm, Operation Enduring Freedom and Operation Iraqi Freedom to destroy targets that would have required large formations of strategic bombers during World War II.

During the Kosovo campaign NATO forces bombed targets far from Kosovo like bridges in Novi Sad, power plants around Belgrade and flea market in Niš. During the 2008 South Ossetia war Russian aircraft attacked the shipbuilding center of Poti.

==== Russian invasion of Ukraine ====
As part of the Russian invasion of Ukraine, missile and drone waves hit Ukraine infrastructure periodically, causing damage, deaths, injuries, and deeply affecting energy distribution across Ukraine and nearby countries. By late November 2022, nearly half of the country's energy systems had been destroyed, leaving millions of Ukrainians without power; energy workers rushed to restore services. The methodical attacks on power stations and electrical nodes imposed large economic and practical costs on Ukraine, with a severe impact for millions of civilians over the winter. It was assumed that Russia's strategic intention was to break the will of the Ukrainian population to continue the war.

== Aerial bombardment and international law ==
Air warfare must comply with laws and customs of war, including international humanitarian law by protecting the victims of the conflict and refraining from attacks on protected persons.

These restraints on aerial warfare are covered by the general laws of war, because unlike the war on land and at sea—which is specifically covered by rules such as the 1907 Hague Convention and Protocol I additional to the Geneva Conventions, which contain pertinent restrictions, prohibitions and guidelines—there are no treaties specific to aerial warfare.

To be legal, aerial operations must comply with the principles of humanitarian law: military necessity, distinction, and proportionality: An attack or action must be intended to help in the defeat of the enemy; it must be an attack on a legitimate military objective, and the harm caused to protected civilians or civilian property must be proportionate and not excessive in relation to the concrete and direct military advantage anticipated.

== Pioneers ==
- Henry H. "Hap" Arnold, USAF
- Giulio Douhet, Regia Aeronautica (Italy)
- Arthur "Bomber" Harris, RAF
- Curtis LeMay, USAF
- Billy Mitchell, USAAS
- Alexander P. de Seversky in Victory Through Air Power (1942 book and 1943 film)
- Carl Spaatz, USAF
- Hugh Trenchard, RAF

== See also ==
- Dahiya doctrine

== Bibliography ==
- Algeo, John (1993). Fifty years among the new words: a dictionary of neologisms, 1941–1991 (2, reprint ed.). Cambridge University Press. ISBN 0-521-44971-5.
- Axinn, Sidney (2008). A Moral Military. Temple University Press. ISBN 978-1-59213-958-3.
- Benbow, Tim, ed. (2011). British Naval Aviation: The First 100 Years. Ashgate Publishing. ISBN 978-1-40940612-9.
- Birnbaum, Michael; Stern, David L.; Rauhala, Emily (October 25, 2022). "Russia's methodical attacks exploit frailty of Ukrainian power system". The Washington Post.
- Black, Jeremy (2007). The Second World War: Causes and Background. Ashgate.
- Boyne, Walter J. (2003). "Zeppelin". The Influence of Air Power on History. Gretna, LA: Pelican. ISBN 9-781-589800-342.
- The strategic air war against Germany, 1939–1945: report of the British Bombing Survey Unit (Report) (Reprint ed.). British Bombing Survey Unit. 1998.
- Brower, Charles F. (1998). World War II in Europe: the final year: Roosevelt Study Center. Palgrave Macmillan. ISBN 978-0-312-21133-2.
- Budiansky, Stephen (2004). Air Power. Viking Penguin Books.
- Carter, Ian (February 2018). "RAF Bomber Command During the Second World War". Imperial War Museum.
- Carter, Ian (June 2018). "What Did Fighter Command Do After the Battle of Britain?". Imperial War Museum.
- Castle, Ian (August 2017). "Strategic Bombing: Gothas over London". Military History Monthly.
- Christopher, John (2013). The Race for Hitler's X-Planes. The Mill, Gloucestershire: History Press.
- Copp, Terry (September–October 1996). "The Bomber Command Offensive". Legion Magazine. Archived from the original on 2013-05-22.
- Cosgrove, Edmund (2003). Canada's Fighting Pilots. Dundurn. ISBN 978-0-91961497-0.
- Craig, Tim; Ryan, Missy; Gibbons-Neff, Thomas (October 10, 2015). "By evening, a hospital. By morning, a war zone". The Washington Post.
- Dannen, Gene (2017-10-02). "International Law on the Bombing of Civilians". Dannen.
- Doerr, Paul W. (1998). British Foreign Policy, 1919–1939. Manchester University Press. ISBN 978-0-71904672-8.
- Fitzsimons, Bernard, ed. (1978a). "Flying Fortress, Boeing B-17". Illustrated Encyclopedia of 20th Century Weapons and Warfare. Vol. 9. London: Phoebus. p. 969.
- Fitzsimons, Bernard, ed. (1978b). "Lancaster, Avro," "Liberator, Consolidated B-24". Illustrated Encyclopedia of 20th Century Weapons and Warfare. Vol. 16. London: Phoebus. pp. 1697, 1700, 1736.
- "Aircraft and the War". Flight. 1914. pp. 905–06. Archived from the original on 2012-03-14.
- Fritz, Stephen G. (2004). Endkampf: soldiers, civilians, and the death of the Third Reich (illustrated ed.). University Press of Kentucky. ISBN 0-8131-2325-9.
- Futrell, Robert F. (February 1983). "The United States Air Force In Korea 1950–1953" (PDF). Defense Technical Information Center. Archived (PDF) from the original on June 29, 2020.
- Gómez, Francisco Javier Guisández (June 1998). "The Law of Air Warfare". International Review of the Red Cross. 38 (323). ICRC: 347–63. doi:10.1017/S0020860400091075. Archived from the original on 2014-12-21.
- Grayling, A. C. (2011). Among the Dead Cities: Is the Targeting of Civilians in War Ever Justified?. A&C Black. ISBN 978-1-40882790-1.
- Grosscup, Beau (2006). Strategic Terror: The Politics and Ethics of Aerial Bombardment. Zed Books. pp. 21–35. ISBN 978-1842775431.
- Guillemin, Jeanne (2017). "2: Spoils of War – Secret Japanese Biological Science". Hidden Atrocities: Japanese Germ Warfare and American Obstruction of Justice at the Tokyo Trial. Columbia University Press. ISBN 978-0231544986.
- Harris, Arthur (2005) [1947]. Bomber Offensive. Military classics. Pen & Sword. ISBN 1-84415-210-3.
- Hastings, Max (1999). Bomber Command. Pan. ISBN 978-0-33039204-4.
- Hayward, Joel (2009). Air Power, Insurgency and the "War on Terror". Royal Air Force Centre for Air Power Studies. ISBN 978-0-9552189-6-5.
- Hessel, Peter (2005). The Mystery of Frankenberg's Canadian Airman (illustrated ed.). James Lorimer & Company. ISBN 1-55028-884-9.
- "Deadly WWII U.S. firebombing raids on Japanese cities largely ignored". The Japan Times. March 2015. Archived from the original on 2019-07-26.
- Johnson, Johnnie (1964). Full Circle: The Story of Air Fighting. Cassel & Co.
- "Godišnjica bombardovanja centra Niša" [Anniversary of the bombing of the center of Niš]. Južne vesti (in Bosnian). 2011-05-07.
- Kauppinen, Jukka O.; Rönkkö, Matti (2006-02-27). "Night of the Bombers".
- Kennedy, David M. (2003). The American People in World War II: Freedom from Fear, Part Two. Oxford University Press. ISBN 978-0-19984005-2.
- Kochavi, Arieh J. (2005). Confronting captivity: Britain and the United States and their POWs in Nazi Germany (illustrated ed.). UNC Press Books. ISBN 0-8078-2940-4.
- Kraemer, Christian (2022-10-26). "Russian bombings of civilian infrastructure raise cost of Ukraine's recovery: IMF". Reuters.
- Lewis, Peter M. H. (1994). "B-29 Superfortress". In Grolier Incorporated (ed.). Academic American Encyclopedia. Vol. 10. Grolier Incorporated. ISBN 978-0-7172-2053-3.
- Longmate, Norman (1983). The Bombers: The RAF offensive against Germany 1939–1945. Hutchinson. ISBN 0-09-151580-7.
- McFarland, Stephen L. (1995). America's pursuit of precision bombing, 1910–1945. Smithsonian. ISBN 1-56098-407-4.
- Myrdal, Alva (1977). The game of disarmament: how the United States and Russia run the arms race. Manchester University Press ND. ISBN 0-7190-0693-7.
- "Korean War 1950–1953" (PDF). National Museum of the US Air Force.
- "National Review". National Review. 111: 51. 1938.
- O'Connell, Robert L. (1990). "The Gotha Bomber and the Origins of Strategic Bombing". MHQ Magazine.
- Omissi, David (1990). Air Power and Colonial Control: The Royal Air Force 1919–1939. Manchester University Press. ISBN 0-7190-2960-0.
- Overy, R. J. (2005). The air war, 1939–1945. Brassey's. ISBN 978-1-57488-716-7.
- Overy, Richard (2013). The Bombing War – Europe 1939–1945. Allen Lane. ISBN 978-0-713-99561-9.
- Overy, Richard (2014). The Bombers and the Bombed: Allied Air War Over Europe 1940–1945.. A longer version was published in UK as The Bombing War: Europe, 1939–1945. 2013.
- Pape, Robert (1996). Bombing to Win: Air Power and Coercion in War. Cornell UP. ISBN 0-80148311-5.
- Pesonen, Aake (1982). "Taistelu Helsingistä". Tuli-iskuja taivaalle (in Finnish). Kirjayhtymä. ISBN 951-26-2318-8.
- Niš 1999, NATO bombardovanje, city of Nis, NATO bombing 1999. RechkeSRB. 23 March 2010. Archived from the original on 2014-01-11 – via YouTube. Also archived at Ghostarchive.
- Reichhardt, Tony (March 2015). "The Deadliest Air Raid in History". Airspace mag.
- Reynolds, Jefferson D. (2005). "Collateral Damage on the 21st-century battlefield: Enemy exploitation of the law of armed conflict, and the struggle for a moral high ground" (PDF). Air Force Law Review. 56: 4–108. Archived from the original (PDF) on September 26, 2006.
- Ross, Stewart (2003). Strategic bombing by the United States in World War II: The myths and the facts. McFarland.
- "The Round Table", The Round Table: 515, 1937.
- Santora, Marc (2022-10-29). "Zelensky says that some four million Ukrainians face restrictions on power use". The New York Times. ISSN 0362-4331.
- Siebert, Detlef (1 August 2001). "British Bombing Strategy in World War Two". BBC.
- Stephens, Bret (2022-11-01). "Opinion | Don't Let Putin Turn Ukraine into Aleppo". The New York Times. ISSN 0362-4331.
- Taylor, Frederick (2005). Dresden: Tuesday 13 February 1945. London: Bloomsbury. ISBN 0-7475-7084-1.
- Thompson, Wayne; Nalty, Bernard C. (1996). "Within Limits – The U.S. Air Force and the Korean War" (PDF). Defense Technical Information Center. Archived (PDF) from the original on February 28, 2017.
- Tilford, Earl (2008-09-17). "Russia's Georgia Take-Down: Implications for Russia and America". Urban Tulsa. Archived from the original on 2011-05-27.
- Tillman, Barrett (2014). Forgotten Fifteenth: The Daring Airmen Who Crippled Hitler's War Machine. Simon & Schuster. p. 35. ISBN 978-1-62157-235-0.
- Tucker, Spencer; Wood, Laura Matysek; Murphy, Justin D., eds. (1999). The European Powers in the First World War: An Encyclopedia. Taylor & Francis. ISBN 978-0815333517.
- Legacies of war: Unexploded ordnance in Laos. govinfo.gov (Report). U.S. Government Publishing Office. 2010-04-22.
- "Udar po elektroenergetskom sistemu Srbije" [Impact on Serbia's power system] (in Bosnian). Vreme. 1999-05-09. Archived from the original on 2016-08-09.
- Wright, George (18 November 2022). "Ukraine war: Almost half Ukraine's energy system disabled, PM says". BBC News.
