= Roger Sarty =

Canadian historian

Roger Sarty (born 27 September 1952 in Halifax, Nova Scotia) is among Canada's leading historians, specializing in the history of Canada's Navy and coastal defence.

== Early life and education ==
Sarty was born and raised in Halifax, Nova Scotia before moving to Toronto in 1965. Sarty entered the University of Toronto, where he received his Bachelor of Arts degree in history. Going on to do graduate work, he earned a master's degree in history at Duke University, then returned to the University of Toronto where he received his Ph.D. in 1985 with a thesis entitled "Silent sentry: a military and political history of Canadian coast defence, 1860-1945".

== Career ==
Prior to 2004, Sarty was an important researcher involved with the Canadian War Museum in Ottawa.

In 2004, Sarty was appointed to a teaching position as a professor at Wilfrid Laurier University. At Wilfrid Laurier University, Sarty has helped numerous undergrad and graduate students achieve success in their academic journeys.

In 2005, he was additionally named chairman of the Council for Canadian Security in the 21st Century, an association based in Calgary. In 2007, he also became editor of The Northern Mariner, published by the Canadian Nautical Research Society in association with the North American Society for Oceanic History.

In 2002, he was awarded, with Brian Tennyson, the C.P. Stacey Prize for their book Guardian of the Gulf: Sydney, Cape Breton and the Atlantic Wars.

== Achievements ==
- Canadian Nautical Research Society Keith Matthews Award for Best Book (1991, 2001, 2004) Honourable Mention (2012).
- Maritime Commander's Commendation (presented by Admiral R. Buck, Chief of the Maritime Staff, for service to Canadian naval history) (2003).
- Queen Elizabeth II Jubilee Medal (for contributions to military history in service of Canadian veterans) (2002).

== Published works ==
- Halifax and the defence of Canada, 1906–1919, Papers of the Canadian Historical Association, 1981
- There will be trouble in the north Pacific : the defence of British Columbia, 1906–1922, Papers of the Canadian Historical Association, 1983.
- Coast Artillery 1815-1914, Alexandria Bay, N.Y.; Bloomfield, Ont.: Museum Restoration Service, 1988.
- Tin-Pots and Pirate Ships: Canadian Naval Forces and German Sea Raiders, 1880–1918, with Michael L. Hadley. Montreal: McGill-Queen's University Press, 1991.
- The Maritime Defence of Canada, Toronto: Canadian Institute of Strategic Studies, 1996.
- Canada and the Battle of the Atlantic, Montreal: Art global, 1998.
- "Entirely in the hands of the friendly neighbour": the Canadian Armed Forces and the defence of the Pacific Coast, 1909–1939, Occasional paper series (Pacific and Maritime Strategic Studies Group.
- Guardian of the Gulf : Sydney, Cape Breton, and the Atlantic wars, Brian Tennyson and Roger Sarty. Toronto: University of Toronto Press, 2000
- The battle of the Atlantic: the Royal Canadian Navy's greatest campaign, 1939–1945, Ottawa: CEF Books, 2001.
- Saint John fortifications, 1630-1956 Roger Sarty and Doug Knight. Fredericton, N.B. : Goose Lane Editions, 2003.
- No higher purpose:, W. A. B. Douglas, Roger Sarty, Michael Whitby with Robert H. Caldwell, William Johnston, William G.P. Rawling. Volume Two, Part 1. St. Catharines, Ont.: Vanwell Pub., 2002.
- A Blue Water Navy: The Official Operational History of the Royal Canadian Navy in the Second World War 1943-1945, W.A.B. Douglas, Roger Sarty, Michael Whitby with Robert H. Caldwell, William Johnston, William G.P. Rawling. Volume Two, Part 2. St. Catharines, Ont.: Vanwell Publishing, 2007.

== Sources ==
- News Release on Appointment to CCS21
- Wilfrid Laurier Faculty page
