= Sydney F. Wise =

Canadian historian

Sydney F. Wise OC FRSC
- Born: November 14, 1924; Toronto, Canada
- Died: March 8, 2007 (aged 82); Toronto, Ontario, Canada
- Occupations: Non-fiction author; journalist; Royal Military College of Canada; Masters at Queen's University at Kingston
- Writing career
- Genres: Canadiana; Canadian history
- Notable awards: Order of Canada

Sydney Francis Wise OC FRSC is a Canadian historian who became the official historian of the Canadian military in 1966.

== Career ==
He joined the Royal Canadian Air Force in 1942 and became a pilot. He enrolled in the Royal Military College of Canada. After graduating he became a professor there, Queens College and Carleton University. In 1966, he was called upon and accepted the position of the official historian of the Canadian military. In 1989 he received the Order of Canada.

== Operation Spring scandal ==
The destruction of the Canada's Black Watch unit during the Operation Spring of the Normandy invasion was seen as a scandal and there were rumours of a Canadian coverup. These rumours were made worse by Stacy and Sydney F. Wise conspired to "keep the only surviving copy of the preliminary report on Operation Spring from Major Griffin’s relatives." The two had actually saved the surviving copy of the report against orders.

== Written work ==
- Wise, Sydney F.; Brown, Robert Craig (1967). Canada Views the United States: Nineteenth-century Political Attitudes. University of Washington Press. ISBN 9780295785509. - Total pages: 139
- Preston, Richard Arthur; Wise, Sydney F. (1979). Men in Arms: A History of Warfare and Its Interrelationships with Western Society. Holt, Rinehart, and Winston. ISBN 9780030456817. - Total pages: 450
- Wise, Sydney F. (1980). Canadian Airmen and the First World War (1980 ed.). University of Toronto Press. ISBN 9780802023797. - Total pages: 771
- Wise, Sydney F. (1980). Canadian Airmen and the First World War: The Official History of the Royal Canadian Air Force, Volume I (PDF). University of Toronto Press. ISBN 9780802023797.
- Preston, Richard Arthur; Roland, Alex; Wise, Sydney F. (1991). Men in Arms: A History of Warfare and Its Interrelationships with Western Society. Holt, Rinehart and Winston. ISBN 9780030334283. - Total pages: 458
- Wise, Sydney F. (1993). McKillop, A.B. (ed.). God's Peculiar Peoples: Essays on Political Culture in Nineteenth Century Canada. McGill-Queen's Press - MQUP. ISBN 9780773595712. - Total pages: 287
- Wise, Sydney F.; Greenhous, Brereton; Harris, Stephen J.; Johnston, William C.; Rawling, William C. (1994). The Crucible of War, 1939-1945, Volume 3. University of Toronto Press. ISBN 9780802005748. - Total pages: 1096

== Bibliography ==
Notes

References

- Balzer, Timothy John (1989). The Information Front: The Canadian Army, Public Relations, and War News during the Second World War (PhD). B.R.E., Northwest Baptist Theological College, 1989; B.A., Trinity Western University, 1991; M.R.E., Trinity Western University, 1993; M.A., University of Victoria, 2004. hdl:1828/1346.
- Douglas, W. A. B. (2007). "Sydney F. Wise, 1924–2007: A Personal Recollection". Canadian Military History. 16 (3). Canadian Armed Forces: 75–80. ISSN 1492-465X. OCLC 842836577.
- Mets, David R. (1982). "History, war and the military professional". Naval War College Review. 35. Newport, Rhode Island: Naval War College. ISSN 0028-1484. LCCN 75617787. OCLC 01779130.
