= Steve Shanahan =

Canadian politician

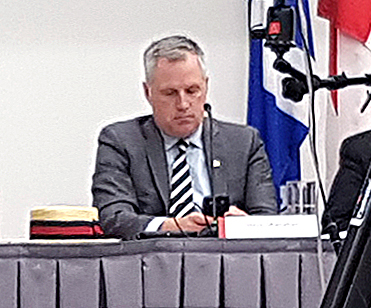
- Steve Shanahan in September 2016

Montreal City Councillor for Peter-McGill
- In office 2013–2017
- Preceded by: Sammy Forcillo
- Succeeded by: Cathy Wong

Personal details
- Party: Conservative Party of Canada; Vrai changement pour Montréal
- Spouse: Stella Shanahan

Steven Léo Shanahan (born September 16, 1970) is a politician in Montreal, Quebec, Canada. He served on the Montreal City Council from 2013 to 2017 as a member of Vrai changement pour Montréal.

== Early life and career ==
Shanahan was born in Sherbrooke. His campaign literature indicates that he is a marketing consultant with a bachelor's degree in administration from Bishop's University.

== Career ==
Shanahan was elected to Montreal city council for the Peter-McGill division in the 2013 municipal election, winning a somewhat unexpected victory over star candidate Damien Silès from Équipe Denis Coderre pour Montréal. During the campaign, Shanahan promised to fight for a French-language school in the district.

Shanahan was the Conservative candidate for Ville-Marie—Le Sud-Ouest—Île-des-Sœurs in the 2015 Canadian federal election, during which he attended the 2015 Montreal Pride Parade while campaigning.

Shanahan ran again in the 2017 municipal election, but lost to Cathy Wong of Équipe Denis Coderre pour Montréal.

== Electoral record ==
2025 Canadian federal election: Ville-Marie—Le Sud-Ouest—Île-des-Sœurs
Party	Candidate	Votes	%	±%
Liberal	Marc Miller	30,905	63.70	+12.33
Conservative	Steve Shanahan	9,113	18.78	+5.96
Bloc Québécois	Kevin Majaducon	4,364	8.99	−2.95
New Democratic	Suzanne Dufresne	2,932	6.04	−12.04
Green	Nathe Perrone	996	2.05	−0.62
Rhinoceros	Giovanni Di Placido	209	0.43	N/A
Total valid votes		48,519	98.91	
Total rejected ballots		533	1.09	-0.33
Turnout		49,052	59.79	+3.93
Eligible voters		82,037		
Liberal notional hold		Swing		+3.18
Source: Elections Canada

2021 Canadian federal election: Ville-Marie–Le Sud-Ouest–Île-des-Sœurs
Party	Candidate	Votes	%	±%	Expenditures
Liberal	Marc Miller	24,978	50.5	-3.0	$105,431.45
New Democratic	Sophie Thiébaut	9,241	18.7	+2.9	$12,104.90
Bloc Québécois	Soledad Orihuela-Bouchard	6,176	12.5	-0.6	$2,242.01
Conservative	Steve Shanahan	6,138	12.4	+3.6	$3,084.59
Green	Cynthia Charbonneau-Lavictoire	1,343	2.7	-4.4	$0.00
People's	Denise Dubé	1,291	2.6	+1.6	$552.90
Marijuana	Hans Armando Vargas	134	0.3	N/A	$0.00
Marxist–Leninist	Linda Sullivan	122	0.2	+0.1	$0.00
Total valid votes/expense limit		49,423	98.6	–	$116,716.76
Total rejected ballots		689	1.4		
Turnout		50,112	57.0		
Eligible voters		87,943			
Liberal hold		Swing		-3.0	
Source: Elections Canada

2015 Canadian federal election: Ville-Marie–Le Sud-Ouest–Île-des-Sœurs
Party	Candidate	Votes	%	±%	Expenditures
Liberal	Marc Miller	25,491	50.82	+23.34	$104,027.97
New Democratic	Allison Turner	11,757	23.44	-18.05	$76,667.01
Conservative	Steve Shanahan	5,948	11.86	-0.05	$10,419.44
Bloc Québécois	Chantal St-Onge	4,307	8.59	-7.44	$2,334.04
Green	Daniel Green	2,398	4.78	+1.99	$84,091.06
Rhinoceros	Daniel Wolfe	161	0.32	–	–
Communist	Bill Sloan	102	0.20	–	–
Total valid votes/expense limit		50,164	100.00	–	$221,982.87
Total rejected ballots		435	0.86	–	–
Turnout		50,599	59.96	–	–
Eligible voters		84,387	–	–	–
Source: Elections Canada

2013 Montreal municipal election: City Councillor, Peter-McGill
Party	Candidate	Votes	%	±%
Vrai changement	Steve Shanahan	1,865	37.46	
Équipe Denis Coderre	Damien Silès	1,366	27.44	
Coalition Montréal	Nicole Trudeau	962	19.32	
Projet Montréal	Jimmy Zoubris	786	15.79	
Total valid votes		4,979	100	–
Total rejected ballots		115	2.26	–
Turnout		5,094	29.54	
Electors on the lists		17,243	–	–
Source: Election results, 2013, City of Montreal.
