= Carman Miller =

Canadian military historian

- Born: Moser River, Nova Scotia
- Education: Acadia University (BA, B.Ed), Dalhousie University (MA), University of London (PhD)
- Occupation: Military historian
- Employer: McGill University
- Spouse: Pamela (Gales)
- Children: Marc Miller (politician)

Carman Irwin Miller (born 1940) is a military historian and former Dean of Arts at McGill University in Montreal.

Miller was born in Moser River, Nova Scotia, the son of Marie Evangeline and Irwin Charles Miller. He received a Bachelor of Arts degree in 1960 and a Bachelor of Education degree in 1961 from Acadia University. Miller received a Master of Arts degree in 1964 from Dalhousie University and a Ph.D. in 1970 from the University of London. He started teaching at McGill University in 1967 as a lecturer in the Department of History. He became an assistant professor in 1971 and associate professor in 1977. He was chairman of the department from 1978 to 1981.

His research focuses on Canada's military participation in the British Empire. He is also a specialist on Canada's contributions in the South African War.

His book A Knight in Politics: A Biography of Sir Frederick Borden was awarded the 2011 C.P. Stacey Prize for "distinguished publications on the twentieth-century military experience."

He is married to retired librarian Pamela J. Miller, and their son is Marc Miller.

== Bibliography ==
- The Canadian career of the Fourth Earl of Minto: the education of a viceroy (Wilfrid Laurier University Press, 1980)
- Painting the Map Red: Canada and the South African War, 1899–1902 (McGill-Queen's University Press, 1993)
- Canada's little war
- A Knight in Politics: A Biography of Sir Frederick Borden (McGill-Queen's University Press, 2010)
