= Marc Milner =

Canadian historian

Joseph Marc Milner (born 12 April 1954) is a Canadian military and naval historian, author of several books including one novel. He was Director of the Gregg Centre for the Study of War and Society at the University of New Brunswick.

== Early life and education ==
The son of William Clayton Milner and Rita Mary Legere Milner, he was born and raised in Sackville, New Brunswick, and attended Tantramar Regional High School from which he graduated in 1973. Going on to university, he graduated from the University of New Brunswick with a Bachelor of Arts degree in 1977, and from the same university earned his Master of Arts degree in 1979 with a thesis on "Canadian escorts and the mid Atlantic 1942–1943". He earned his Ph.D. there in 1983, completing a doctoral dissertation titled "No higher purpose: the Royal Canadian Navy's mid-Atlantic war 1939–1944".

== Career ==
Upon completion of his PhD, Milner began his professional career in 1983 as an historian in the Directorate of History, National Defense Headquarters, where he served until 1986, when the University of New Brunswick appointed him an assistant professor of history and director of its military and strategic studies program. Rising to become a full professor he became chairman of the history department, 2002–2010, and was Director of the university's Brigadier Milton Fowler Gregg, VC, Centre for the Study of War and Society from 2006-2025.

He was the recipient of the C.P. Stacey Prize in 2004 for his book Battle of the Atlantic.

Milner is fond of sailing, has cruised various Atlantic Canadian shorelines in his 16-foot daysailer, and spent time "before the mast" on the tall ship HMS Rose between Boston and Halifax, Nova Scotia.

He is married and has two children.

== Publications ==
Author

- Canadian Naval Force Requirements in the Second World War (1981).
- North Atlantic Run: The Royal Canadian Navy and the Battle for the Convoys (1985, 2005)) ISBN 0-87021-450-0
- The U-Boat Hunters: The Royal Canadian Navy and the Offensive Against Germany's Submarines, 1943–1945, US Naval Institute Press (November 1994) ISBN 1-55750-854-2
- HMCS Sackville, 1941–1985, Canadian Naval Memorial Trust (1998) ISBN 0-9683661-0-4
- Canada's Navy : The First Century, University of Toronto Press (1999, 2010, 2017) ISBN 0-8020-4281-3
- Incident at North Point, Vanwell Publishing Ltd (April 17, 2003) ISBN 1-55125-011-X (novel)
- Battle of the Atlantic, Tempus Publishing Ltd (September 2005) ISBN 0-7524-3332-6
- D-Day to Carpiquet: The North Shore Regiment and the Liberation of Europe, Goose Lane Editions & New Brunswick Military Heritage Project (New Brunswick Military Heritage Series) (May 2007) ISBN 0-86492-489-5
- New Brunswick and the Navy: Four Hundred Years (2010)
- Stopping the Panzers: The Untold Story of D-Day. (Modern War Studies.) Lawrence: University Press of Kansas, 2014

With Robert Power

- Survey of Historical Resources in New Brunswick (1979).

With Ken MacPherson

- Corvettes of the Royal Canadian Navy: 1939–1945. Vanwell Pub Ltd. (Feb 28 1994) ISBN 0-920277-83-7

With D. Charters and B. Wilson

- Defence Policy for a New Century: The UNB Workshop on the Defence Policy Review (1994)
- Military History and the Military Profession (1992)

With Lee Windsor and Roger Sarty

- Loyal Gunners: 3rd Field Artillery Regiment (The Loyal Company) and the History of New Brunswick's Artillery, 1893–2012. Wilfrid Laurier University Press (2016)
