= C.P. Stacey Prize =

The C.P. Stacey Prize (also known as the C.P. Stacey Award) is given by the C.P. Stacey Award Committee and the Laurier Centre for the Study of Canada (formerly the Laurier Centre for Military Strategic and Disarmament Studies, it took over administration of the award in 2018 from the Canadian Committee for the History of the Second World War) "for distinguished publications on the twentieth-century military experience." It is named in memory of Charles Perry Stacey who was the official historian of the Canadian Army in the Second World War.

== Winners ==
- 1988 - Norman Hillmer, W. A. B. Douglas: The Official History of the Royal Canadian Air Force, Volume II: The Creation of a National Air Force
- 1990 - Robert Vogel, Terry Copp: Maple Leaf Route
- 1992 - Bill McAndrew, Terry Copp: Battle Exhaustion
- 1994 - Desmond Morton: When Your Number's Up
- 1996 - George Blackburn: The Guns of Victory
- 1998 - Jonathan F.W. Vance: Death So Noble: Memory, Meaning and the First World War
- 2000 - Tim Cook: No Place to Run: The Canadian Corps and Gas Warfare in the First World War
- 2002 - Brian Tennyson, Roger Sarty: Guardian of the Gulf: Sydney, Cape Breton and the Atlantic Wars
- 2004 - Marc Milner: Battle of the Atlantic
- 2004 - Béatrice Richard: La mémoire de Dieppe - Radioscopie d'un mythe
- 2006 - Douglas Delaney: Bert Hoffmeister: The Soldier's General
- 2008 - Stephen Brumwell: Paths of Glory: The Life and Death of General James Wolfe
- 2008 - Paul Douglas Dickson: A Thoroughly Canadian General: A Biography of General H.D.G. Crerar
- 2009 - Kevin Spooner: Canada, The Congo Crisis and U.N. Peacekeeping
- 2010 - Carman Miller: A Knight in Politics: A Biography of Sir Frederick Borden
- 2011 - Dean Frederick Oliver, Jack Granatstein: The Oxford Companion to Canadian Military History
- 2012 - Andrew Burtch: Give Me Shelter: The Failure of Canada's Cold War Civil Defence
- 2013 - Teresa Iacobelli: Death or Deliverance: Canadian Courts Martial in the Great War
- 2014 - Tim Cook: The Necessary War, Volume 1: Canadians Fighting The Second World War:1939-1943
- 2014 - Richard M. Reid: African Canadians in Union Blue: Volunteering for the Cause in the Civil War
- 2015 - Norman Hillmer: O.D. Skelton: A Portrait of Canadian Ambition
- 2016 - Brock Millman: Polarity, Patriotism and Dissent in Great War Canada, 1914-1919
- 2017 - Geoffrey Hayes: Crerar's Lieutenants: Inventing the Canadian Junior Army Officer, 1939-45
- 2018 - Jonathan F.W. Vance: A Township at War
- 2019 - Bob Bergen: Scattering Chaff: Canadian Air Power and Censorship during the Kosovo War
- 2020/21 - Irene Gammel: I Can Only Paint: The Story of Battlefield Artist Mary Riter Hamilton
- 2022 - David A. Wilson: Canadian Spy Story: Irish Revolutionaries and the Secret Police
- 2023 - David Roberts: Boosters and Barkers: Financing Canada's Involvement in the First World War
- 2024 - Gregory M.W. Kennedy: Lost in the Crowd: Acadian Soldiers of Canada’s First World War
