= Marc Miller (politician) =

Canadian politician

The Honourable Marc Miller PC MP
- Miller in 2026

Minister of Canadian Identity and Culture
- Incumbent
- Assumed office December 1, 2025
- Prime Minister: Mark Carney
- Preceded by: Steven Guilbeault

Minister responsible for Official Languages
- Incumbent
- Assumed office December 1, 2025
- Prime Minister: Mark Carney
- Preceded by: Steven Guilbeault

Minister of Immigration, Refugees and Citizenship
- In office July 26, 2023 – March 14, 2025
- Prime Minister: Justin Trudeau
- Preceded by: Sean Fraser
- Succeeded by: Rachel Bendayan

Minister of Crown–Indigenous Relations
- In office October 26, 2021 – July 26, 2023
- Prime Minister: Justin Trudeau
- Preceded by: Carolyn Bennett
- Succeeded by: Gary Anandasangaree

Minister of Indigenous Services
- In office November 20, 2019 – October 26, 2021
- Prime Minister: Justin Trudeau
- Preceded by: Seamus O'Regan
- Succeeded by: Patty Hajdu

Parliamentary Secretary to the Minister of Crown–Indigenous Relations
- In office August 31, 2018 – November 20, 2019
- Minister: Carolyn Bennett
- Preceded by: Yvonne Jones
- Succeeded by: Position abolished

Parliamentary Secretary to the Minister of Infrastructure and Communities
- In office January 30, 2017 – August 30, 2018
- Minister: Amarjeet Sohi
- Preceded by: Pablo Rodriguez
- Succeeded by: Marco Mendicino

Member of Parliament for Ville-Marie—Le Sud-Ouest— Île-des-Sœurs
- Incumbent
- Assumed office October 19, 2015
- Preceded by: Riding established

Personal details
- Born: March 12, 1973 (age 53) Montreal, Quebec, Canada
- Party: Liberal
- Spouse: Elin Sandberg Miller
- Parent: Carman Miller (father)
- Education: Université de Montréal; McGill University
- Profession: Attorney; soldier

Military service
- Allegiance: Canada
- Branch: Canadian Army

Marc Miller (born March 12, 1973) is a Canadian lawyer and politician who has been Minister of Canadian Identity and Culture, and Minister responsible for Official Languages since 2025. A member of the Liberal Party, Miller was elected as the member of Parliament (MP) for Ville-Marie—Le Sud-Ouest—Île-des-Sœurs in the 2015 federal election. Miller was previously Minister of Indigenous Services from 2019 to 2021, Minister of Crown–Indigenous Relations from 2021 to 2023, and Minister of Immigration, Refugees and Citizenship from 2023 to 2025.

== Early life and education ==
An anglophone Montrealer, Miller is the son of Pamela (Gales) and Carman Miller, a military historian and Dean of Arts at McGill. He attended Collège Jean-de-Brébeuf in the 1980s at the same time as Justin Trudeau, and has been described variously as "a boyhood friend of Mr. Trudeau" and "one of Trudeau's oldest friends." Miller earned bachelor's and master's degrees in political science from the Université de Montréal.

Miller graduated from McGill University Faculty of Law in 2001 with common and civil law degrees. Before his election, Miller practised law at Stikeman Elliott. Miller also previously served in the Canadian Army Primary Reserve to the rank of Master Corporal.

== Federal politics ==
Miller helped organize Trudeau's first run for office in Papineau in 2007. He was an advisor and the fundraising director for Trudeau's successful run at the 2013 Liberal Party leadership election.

=== 42nd Canadian Parliament ===
Miller was elected in the 2015 federal election to represent the riding of Ville-Marie—Le Sud-Ouest—Île-des-Sœurs in the 42nd Canadian Parliament. After the election, he served as the chair of the Quebec Liberal Caucus of MPs.

On January 28, 2017, Miller was appointed as Parliamentary Secretary to the Minister of Infrastructure and Communities. On June 1, 2017, Miller delivered the first speech in the Mohawk language in the House of Commons. Miller said he had started taking language lessons from Zoe Hopkins in the spirit of reconciliation. He also wanted to demonstrate to the non-French speaking Liberal MPs whom he had urged to study French in his former role as the Quebec Liberal Caucus chair that it was possible to juggle learning a new language while performing their parliamentary duties.

On August 31, 2018, he was moved to be the parliamentary secretary to the Minister of Crown–Indigenous Relations.

=== 43rd Canadian Parliament ===
On November 20, 2019, just after the 2019 Canadian federal election to the 43rd Canadian Parliament, he was sworn in as Minister of Indigenous Services.

=== 44th Canadian Parliament ===
On October 26, 2021, just after the 2021 Canadian federal election to the 44th Canadian Parliament, Miller was named the Minister of Crown–Indigenous Relations, replacing Carolyn Bennett.

On July 26, 2023, Miller became the Minister of Immigration, Refugees and Citizenship. After Miller replaced Sean Fraser, he announced the 2024–2026 immigration levels plan for permanent residents, with 485,000 in 2024 and 500,000 in both 2025 and 2026. Canada's population grew by over 2.3 million in two years (July 2022–July 2024), the highest growth seen since the 1950s. With increasing unemployment and continued housing and affordability issues, Miller initially said reducing immigration targets was not feasible but he later signalled there could be an adjustment coming in November 2024. Miller claims high population growth has prevented two recessions. He also called the insinuation the Liberal government dramatically increased immigration targets to secure votes in future elections, "political hooey". Polls show immigrants who have been in the country longer than six years do not plan to vote Liberal in the next federal election.

There was a rise in international students requesting asylum in 2023. In January 2024, Miller announced a two-year cap on international student permits. Miller also signalled the number of temporary foreign workers would be reconsidered. On October 24, 2024, after increasing immigration targets each year since taking power in 2015 (excluding the COVID pandemic), the Liberal government announced they were reducing the number of permanent residents by 20%, commencing in 2025. By 2027, the number of permanent residents would be 365,000, down from the previously proposed target of 500,000. The new target was in the middle of what economists recommended but higher than the 300,000 target the government followed before Justin Trudeau was elected. During the press conference, Miller claimed rent in Vancouver and Toronto had decreased since the government reduced the number of study permits by 43% the previous year. With lower permanent resident targets Miller believes 670,000 fewer housing units will be needed by the end of 2027. A report from the Office of the Parliamentary Budget Officer released on November 15 said the revised immigration targets will only reduce the housing gap by 534,000 units by 2030. The government plans to continue reducing the temporary resident population from 7% to 5% in the coming years. Miller stated, "This shows that we are listening to Canadians. It shows that we have a controlled immigration plan that we can be proud of." A report by Desjardins Group released in February 2025, stated although fewer international students were admitted, overall population growth in Canada was largely unchanged and the government would need more aggressive reductions to achieve its revised lower population targets.

Miller's plan to disperse asylum seekers across the country, in September 2024, was met with pushback from some premiers.

On August 14, 2024, Miller said he was "disgusted" with the case of Ahmed Fouad Mostafa Eldidi, who was made a citizen of Canada after he had beheaded someone on film when he was part of the terrorist group ISIS in 2018. Eldidi would have gone unnoticed until a tip from police in France notified the RCMP of a conspiracy to terrorize Canadians while the 2024 Paris Olympics were ongoing. Eldidi and his son were apprehended with bombs at a hotel in Toronto on July 28 and charged with terrorism, possession of weapons and conspiracy to commit murder for the Islamic State.

In October 2024, Miller remained a staunch supporter of Trudeau's when some Liberal MPs expressed their concern over projected losses in the 2025 Canadian federal election if he remained in power. After Trudeau stepped down, Miller declined to run in the 2025 Liberal Party of Canada leadership election and chose to back candidate Mark Carney.

=== 45th Canadian Parliament ===
After Carney's swearing-in and Miller's re-election to Parliament, he was not selected for a cabinet post in the 30th Canadian Ministry.

Following the resignation of Steven Guilbeault from Cabinet, Miller was appointed Minister of Canadian Identity and Culture and Minister responsible for Official Languages on December 1, 2025. Shortly after his appointment, Miller stated that he did not appreciate the "politicization" of the conversation on the decline of the French language in Quebec. Premier François Legault responded by describing Miller as a "disgrace to all Quebecers". In June 2026, Miller announced a proposed nationwide social media ban that would prohibit children under 16 from using major social media platforms.

== Personal life ==
Miller married Elin Sandberg, a former Swedish diplomat, whom he met at a party while both were studying at the Université de Montréal. Together, they have three children, two boys named Marius and Lukas and a girl named Eva.

Miller is fluent in both English and French, while also speaking Swedish and Mohawk. At the time of the 2025 Canadian federal election, he lived in Ottawa.

== Electoral record ==
2025 Canadian federal election: Ville-Marie—Le Sud-Ouest—Île-des-Sœurs
Party	Candidate	Votes	%	±%	Expenditures
Liberal	Marc Miller	30,905	63.70	+12.33	$119,539.09
Conservative	Steve Shanahan	9,113	18.78	+5.96	$38,221.49
Bloc Québécois	Kevin Majaducon	4,364	8.99	−2.95	$3,221.59
New Democratic	Suzanne Dufresne	2,932	6.04	−12.04	$0.00
Green	Nathe Perrone	996	2.05	−0.62	$112.68
Rhinoceros	Giovanni Di Placido	209	0.43	N/A	$0.00
Total valid votes		48,519	98.91	+0.33	$128,375.17
Total rejected ballots		533	1.09	–0.33	
Turnout		49,052	59.79	+3.93	
Eligible voters		82,037			
Liberal notional hold		Swing		+3.18	
Source: Elections Canada

2021 Canadian federal election: Ville-Marie–Le Sud-Ouest–Île-des-Sœurs
Party	Candidate	Votes	%	±%	Expenditures
Liberal	Marc Miller	24,978	50.5	-3.0	$105,431.45
New Democratic	Sophie Thiébaut	9,241	18.7	+2.9	$12,104.90
Bloc Québécois	Soledad Orihuela-Bouchard	6,176	12.5	-0.6	$2,242.01
Conservative	Steve Shanahan	6,138	12.4	+3.6	$3,084.59
Green	Cynthia Charbonneau-Lavictoire	1,343	2.7	-4.4	$0.00
People's	Denise Dubé	1,291	2.6	+1.6	$552.90
Marijuana	Hans Armando Vargas	134	0.3	N/A	$0.00
Marxist–Leninist	Linda Sullivan	122	0.2	+0.1	$0.00
Total valid votes/expense limit		49,423	98.6	–	$116,716.76
Total rejected ballots		689	1.4		
Turnout		50,112	57.0		
Eligible voters		87,943			
Liberal hold		Swing		-3.0	
Source: Elections Canada

2019 Canadian federal election: Ville-Marie–Le Sud-Ouest–Île-des-Sœurs
Party	Candidate	Votes	%	±%	Expenditures
Liberal	Marc Miller	28,087	53.47	+2.65	$105,389.48
New Democratic	Sophie Thiébaut	8,274	15.75	-7.69	$19,083.09
Bloc Québécois	Nadia Bourque	6,899	13.13	+4.54	none listed
Conservative	Michael Forian	4,609	8.78	-3.08	$24,699.31
Green	Liana Canton Cusmano	3,718	7.08	+2.3	$1,593.95
People's	Jean Langlais	520	0.99	–	none listed
Rhinoceros	Tommy Gaudet	140	0.27	-0.05	none listed
Independent	Louise O'Sullivan	117	0.22	–	none listed
No affiliation	Marc Patenaude	113	0.22	–	none listed
Marxist–Leninist	Linda Sullivan	45	0.09	–	$0.00
Total valid votes/expense limit		52,522	100.0		
Total rejected ballots		601			
Turnout		53,123			
Eligible voters		88,117			
Liberal hold		Swing		+5.17	
Source: Elections Canada

2015 Canadian federal election: Ville-Marie–Le Sud-Ouest–Île-des-Sœurs
Party	Candidate	Votes	%	±%	Expenditures
Liberal	Marc Miller	25,491	50.82	+23.34	$104,027.97
New Democratic	Allison Turner	11,757	23.44	-18.05	$76,667.01
Conservative	Steve Shanahan	5,948	11.86	-0.05	$10,419.44
Bloc Québécois	Chantal St-Onge	4,307	8.59	-7.44	$2,334.04
Green	Daniel Green	2,398	4.78	+1.99	$84,091.06
Rhinoceros	Daniel Wolfe	161	0.32	–	–
Communist	Bill Sloan	102	0.20	–	–
Total valid votes/expense limit		50,164	100.00	–	$221,982.87
Total rejected ballots		435	0.86	–	–
Turnout		50,599	59.96	–	–
Eligible voters		84,387	–	–	–
Source: Elections Canada

Order of precedence
Preceded by Patty Hajdu as Member of the Cabinet	Order of Precedence of Canada as Member of the Cabinet	Succeeded by Sean Fraser as Member of the Cabinet
