= Minister responsible for Official Languages (Canada) =

Federal cabinet minister (2003–2025)

- Ministre responsable des Langues officielles
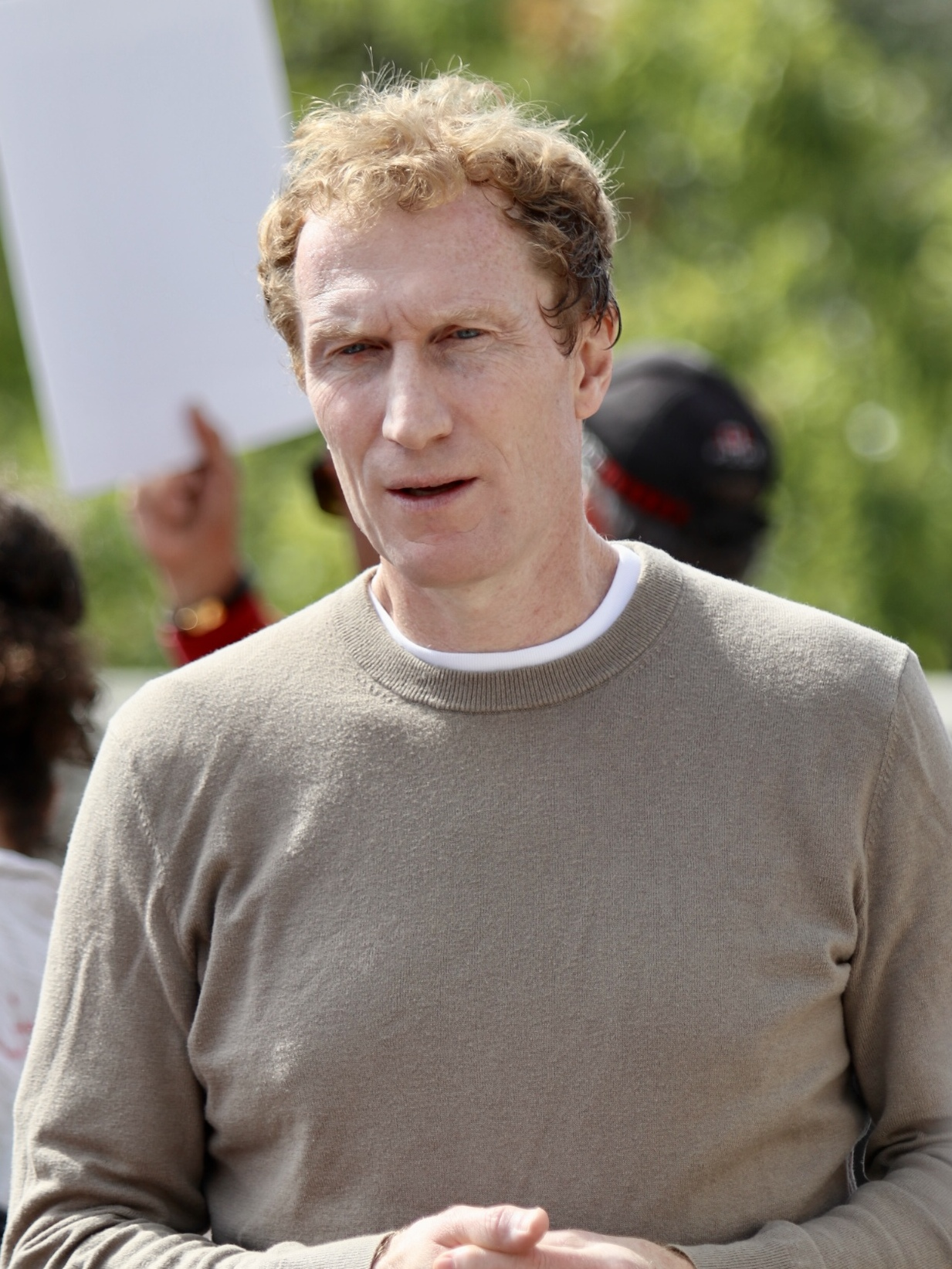
- Incumbent; Marc Miller since December 1, 2025
- Department of Canadian Heritage
- Style: The Honourable
- Member of: Cabinet; Privy Council
- Reports to: Parliament; Prime Minister
- Appointer: Monarch (represented by the governor general); on the advice of the prime minister
- Term length: At His Majesty's pleasure
- Constituting instrument: Official Languages Act
- Formation: 2003
- Salary: CA$299,900 (2024)

The minister responsible for official languages (French: ministre responsable des langues officielles) is a minister of the Crown in the Canadian Cabinet. The minister is supported by the Department of Canadian Heritage and is responsible for administering Official Languages Act.

The role has been held by Marc Miller since 2025. The minister is selected by the prime minister and appointed by the Crown. The position was first introduced in 2003 and the position has often been held in conjunction with another portfolio, such as minister responsible for La Francophonie or minister of Canadian heritage.

== Background ==
In 2003, the first minister responsible for Official Languages was sworn in, on the creation of the "Official Languages Branch of Intergovernmental Affairs" within the Privy Council Office. In 2006, responsibility was shifted from the Privy Council Office to the Department of Canadian Heritage, and the branch was renamed the "Official Languages Secretariat".

Sections 42 and 43 of the Official Languages Act give the minister of Canadian heritage the specific responsibility of taking measures to advance the equality of status and use of English and French in Canadian society; under section 44 of that Act, the minister must submit annual reports to Parliament on the matters relating to official languages for which the minister is responsible.

== List of ministers ==
Name	Term of office		Title	Political party	Ministry
Pierre Pettigrew	December 12, 2003	July 19, 2004	Minister responsible for Official Languages	Liberal	27^{th} (Martin)
Mauril Bélanger	July 20, 2004	February 5, 2006	Minister responsible for Official Languages	Liberal	27^{th} (Martin)
Josée Verner	February 6, 2006	August 13, 2007	Minister for La Francophonie and Official Languages	Conservative	28^{th} (Harper)
Josée Verner	August 14, 2007	May 26, 2008	Minister of Canadian Heritage, Status of Women and Official Languages	Conservative	28^{th} (Harper)
James Moore	June 25, 2008	October 29, 2008	Secretary of State (Asia-Pacific Gateway) (2010 Olympics) (Official Languages)	Conservative	28^{th} (Harper)
James Moore	October 30, 2008	July 14, 2013	Minister of Canadian Heritage and Official Languages	Conservative	28^{th} (Harper)
Shelly Glover	July 15, 2013	November 4, 2015	Minister of Canadian Heritage and Official Languages	Conservative	28^{th} (Harper)
Mélanie Joly	July 18, 2018	November 20, 2019	Minister of Tourism, Official Languages and La Francophonie	Liberal	29^{th} (Trudeau)
Mélanie Joly	November 20, 2019	October 26, 2021	Minister of Economic Development and Official Languages	Liberal	29^{th} (Trudeau)
Ginette Petitpas Taylor	October 26, 2021	July 26, 2023	Minister of Official Languages	Liberal	29^{th} (Trudeau)
Randy Boissonnault	July 26, 2023	November 20, 2024	Minister of Employment, Workforce Development and Official Languages	Liberal	29^{th} (Trudeau)
Ginette Petitpas Taylor	November 20, 2024	December 20, 2024	Minister of Employment, Workforce Development and Official Languages	Liberal	29^{th} (Trudeau)
Rachel Bendayan	December 20, 2024	March 14, 2025	Minister of Official Languages	Liberal	29^{th} (Trudeau)
Vacant	March 14, 2025	May 13, 2025	N/A	Liberal	30^{th} (Carney)
Steven Guilbeault	May 13, 2025	November 27, 2025	Minister responsible for Official Languages	Liberal	30^{th} (Carney)
Marc Miller	December 1, 2025	Present	Minister responsible for Official Languages	Liberal	30^{th} (Carney)

== See also ==
- Department of Canadian Heritage
- Official bilingualism in Canada
- Official Languages Act (Canada)
- Minister of Canadian Heritage
