= Ville-Marie—Le Sud-Ouest—Île-des-Sœurs =

Federal electoral district in Quebec, Canada

Quebec electoral district
- Interactive map of riding boundaries from the 2025 federal election

Federal electoral district
- Legislature: House of Commons
MP
Marc Miller
Liberal
- District created: 2013
- First contested: 2015
- Last contested: 2025
- District webpage: profile, map

Demographics
- Population (2016): 114,659
- Electors (2015): 83,351
- Area (km²): 19
- Pop. density (per km²): 6,034.7
- Census division: Montreal (part)
- Census subdivision: Montreal (part)

Ville-Marie—Le Sud-Ouest—Île-des-Sœurs is a federal electoral district in Montreal, Quebec, Canada, that has been represented in the House of Commons of Canada since 2015.

== Geography ==
The riding included the western part of Ville-Marie (downtown), the neighbourhoods of Saint-Henri, Little Burgundy, Griffintown and Pointe-Saint-Charles in the Le Sud-Ouest borough, as well as Nuns' Island in the borough of Verdun.

== History ==
Ville-Marie—Le Sud-Ouest—Île-des-Sœurs was created by the 2012 federal electoral boundaries redistribution out of parts of Jeanne-Le Ber, Westmount—Ville-Marie, Laurier—Sainte-Marie and Outremont. It was legally defined in the 2013 representation order, and came into effect upon the call of the 2015 Canadian federal election. The riding was originally intended to be named Ville-Marie.

Following the 2022 Canadian federal electoral redistribution, it lost the territory north of Boul. Robert-Bourassa and east of Av. Viger (including Saint Helen's Island and Notre Dame Island) to Laurier—Sainte-Marie, and lost the territory west of Rue Notre-Dame and Av. Atwater to Notre-Dame-de-Grâce—Westmount.

== Demographics ==
According to the 2016 Canadian census

- Languages (2016 mother tongue) : 43.4% French, 21.1% English, 6.2% Arabic, 5.2% Mandarin, 4.3% Spanish, 2.8% Farsi, 1.6% Russian, 1.5% Bengali, 1.1% Cantonese, 0.9% Italian, 0.8% Portuguese, 0.8% Korean, 0.7% Romanian, 0.6% Vietnamese, 0.5% German, 0.5% Polish, 0.4% Urdu, 0.4% Hindi, 0.4% Turkish, 0.4% Greek, 0.3% Tamil, 0.3% Panjabi, 0.3% Hungarian, 0.3% Bulgarian, 0.3% Japanese, 0.3% Armenian

== Members of Parliament ==
This riding has elected the following members of Parliament:

| Parliament | Years | Member | Party |
|---|---|---|---|
Ville-Marie—Le Sud-Ouest—Île-des-Sœurs; Riding created from Jeanne-Le Ber, Laurier—Sainte-Marie, Outremont and Westmount—Ville-Marie
| 42nd | 2015–2019 | Marc Miller | Liberal |
| 43rd | 2019–2021 | Marc Miller | Liberal |
| 44th | 2021–2025 | Marc Miller | Liberal |
| 45th | 2025–present | Marc Miller | Liberal |

== Election results ==
2025 Canadian federal election
| Party | Candidate | Votes | % | ±% | Expenditures |
|---|---|---|---|---|---|
| Liberal | Marc Miller | 30,905 | 63.70 | +12.33 | $119,539.09 |
| Conservative | Steve Shanahan | 9,113 | 18.78 | +5.96 | $38,221.49 |
| Bloc Québécois | Kevin Majaducon | 4,364 | 8.99 | −2.95 | $3,221.59 |
| New Democratic | Suzanne Dufresne | 2,932 | 6.04 | −12.04 | $0.00 |
| Green | Nathe Perrone | 996 | 2.05 | −0.62 | $112.68 |
| Rhinoceros | Giovanni Di Placido | 209 | 0.43 | N/A | $0.00 |
| Total valid votes | | 48,519 | 98.91 | +0.33 | $128,375.17 |
| Total rejected ballots | | 533 | 1.09 | –0.33 | |
| Turnout | | 49,052 | 59.79 | +3.93 | |
| Eligible voters | | 82,037 | | | |
| Liberal notional hold | | Swing | | +3.18 | |
Source: Elections Canada

2021 federal election redistributed results
| Party | Vote | % |
|---|---|---|
| Liberal | 20,831 | 51.37 |
| New Democratic | 7,333 | 18.08 |
| Conservative | 5,199 | 12.82 |
| Bloc Québécois | 4,843 | 11.94 |
| Green | 1,083 | 2.67 |
| People's | 1,059 | 2.61 |
| Marijuana | 109 | 0.27 |
| Marxist-Leninist | 97 | 0.24 |
| Total valid votes | 40,554 | 98.58 |
| Rejected ballots | 583 | 1.42 |
| Registered voters/ estimated turnout | 73,636 | 55.87 |

2021 Canadian federal election: Ville-Marie–Le Sud-Ouest–Île-des-Sœurs
| Party | Candidate | Votes | % | ±% | Expenditures |
|---|---|---|---|---|---|
| Liberal | Marc Miller | 24,978 | 50.5 | -3.0 | $105,431.45 |
| New Democratic | Sophie Thiébaut | 9,241 | 18.7 | +2.9 | $12,104.90 |
| Bloc Québécois | Soledad Orihuela-Bouchard | 6,176 | 12.5 | -0.6 | $2,242.01 |
| Conservative | Steve Shanahan | 6,138 | 12.4 | +3.6 | $3,084.59 |
| Green | Cynthia Charbonneau-Lavictoire | 1,343 | 2.7 | -4.4 | $0.00 |
| People's | Denise Dubé | 1,291 | 2.6 | +1.6 | $552.90 |
| Marijuana | Hans Armando Vargas | 134 | 0.3 | N/A | $0.00 |
| Marxist–Leninist | Linda Sullivan | 122 | 0.2 | +0.1 | $0.00 |
| Total valid votes/expense limit | | 49,423 | 98.6 | – | $116,716.76 |
| Total rejected ballots | | 689 | 1.4 | | |
| Turnout | | 50,112 | 57.0 | | |
| Eligible voters | | 87,943 | | | |
| Liberal hold | | Swing | | -3.0 | |
Source: Elections Canada

2019 Canadian federal election: Ville-Marie–Le Sud-Ouest–Île-des-Sœurs
| Party | Candidate | Votes | % | ±% | Expenditures |
|---|---|---|---|---|---|
| Liberal | Marc Miller | 28,087 | 53.47 | +2.65 | $105,389.48 |
| New Democratic | Sophie Thiébaut | 8,274 | 15.75 | -7.69 | $19,083.09 |
| Bloc Québécois | Nadia Bourque | 6,899 | 13.13 | +4.54 | none listed |
| Conservative | Michael Forian | 4,609 | 8.78 | -3.08 | $24,699.31 |
| Green | Liana Canton Cusmano | 3,718 | 7.08 | +2.3 | $1,593.95 |
| People's | Jean Langlais | 520 | 0.99 | – | none listed |
| Rhinoceros | Tommy Gaudet | 140 | 0.27 | -0.05 | none listed |
| Independent | Louise O'Sullivan | 117 | 0.22 | – | none listed |
| No affiliation | Marc Patenaude | 113 | 0.22 | – | none listed |
| Marxist–Leninist | Linda Sullivan | 45 | 0.09 | – | $0.00 |
| Total valid votes/expense limit | | 52,522 | 100.0 | | |
| Total rejected ballots | | 601 | | | |
| Turnout | | 53,123 | | | |
| Eligible voters | | 88,117 | | | |
| Liberal hold | | Swing | | +5.17 | |
Source: Elections Canada

2015 Canadian federal election: Ville-Marie–Le Sud-Ouest–Île-des-Sœurs
| Party | Candidate | Votes | % | ±% | Expenditures |
|---|---|---|---|---|---|
| Liberal | Marc Miller | 25,491 | 50.82 | +23.34 | $104,027.97 |
| New Democratic | Allison Turner | 11,757 | 23.44 | -18.05 | $76,667.01 |
| Conservative | Steve Shanahan | 5,948 | 11.86 | -0.05 | $10,419.44 |
| Bloc Québécois | Chantal St-Onge | 4,307 | 8.59 | -7.44 | $2,334.04 |
| Green | Daniel Green | 2,398 | 4.78 | +1.99 | $84,091.06 |
| Rhinoceros | Daniel Wolfe | 161 | 0.32 | – | – |
| Communist | Bill Sloan | 102 | 0.20 | – | – |
| Total valid votes/expense limit | | 50,164 | 100.00 | – | $221,982.87 |
| Total rejected ballots | | 435 | 0.86 | – | – |
| Turnout | | 50,599 | 59.96 | – | – |
| Eligible voters | | 84,387 | – | – | – |
Source: Elections Canada

2011 federal election redistributed results
| Party | Vote | % |
|---|---|---|
| New Democratic | 16,625 | 41.49 |
| Liberal | 11,013 | 27.48 |
| Bloc Québécois | 6,423 | 16.03 |
| Conservative | 4,772 | 11.91 |
| Green | 1,117 | 2.79 |
| Others | 123 | 0.31 |

== See also ==
- List of Canadian electoral districts
- Historical federal electoral districts of Canada
