= Terry Copp =

Canadian military historian

- Born: John Terry Copp; 1938 (age 87–88); Montreal, Quebec, Canada
- Education: Sir George Williams University (BA); McGill University (MA)
- Occupations: Military historian, professor
- Website: terrycopp.com

John Terry Copp CM (born 1938) is a Canadian military historian and Professor Emeritus at Wilfrid Laurier University and is the co-founder and former Director of the Laurier Centre for the Study of Canada. As of 2024, Copp is a member of the Order of Canada.

Copp was born and raised in Montreal, Quebec. He was educated at Sir George Williams University (BA) and McGill University (MA), Copp first published The Anatomy of Poverty: The Condition of the Working Class in Montreal, 1897–1929 in 1974. He later moved to Wilfrid Laurier University where he co-founded the Laurier Centre for Military Strategic and Disarmament Studies in 1991, which was later renamed the Laurier Centre for the Study of Canada. He founded the journal Canadian Military History.

Copp was instrumental in popularizing battlefield study tours and experiential historical education. He was also the military analyst for the acclaimed television series No Price Too High and a frequent contributor to Legion Magazine. Copp has published numerous battlefield travel guides on Canada's military history in the War of 1812, World War I and World War II.

In addition to many other academic accomplishments, Copp is the author of nearly two dozen articles and book chapters, editor or co-author of 25 books, and author of more than half a dozen titles. His books include Cinderella Army: The Canadians in Northwest Europe, Fields of Fire: The Canadians in Normandy, No Price Too High, The Brigade: The Fifth Canadian Infantry Brigade and The Canadian Battlefields in Italy: Sicily and Southern Italy. His most recent work is Montreal at War 1914-1918. He is a two time recipient (1990 and 1992) of the C.P. Stacey Prize.

In 2024, he was appointed to the Order of Canada. He lives in Elora, Ontario.

== See also ==
- Maple Leaf Route
