= Tim Cook (historian) =

Canadian military historian and author (1971–2025)

Tim Cook CM FRSC
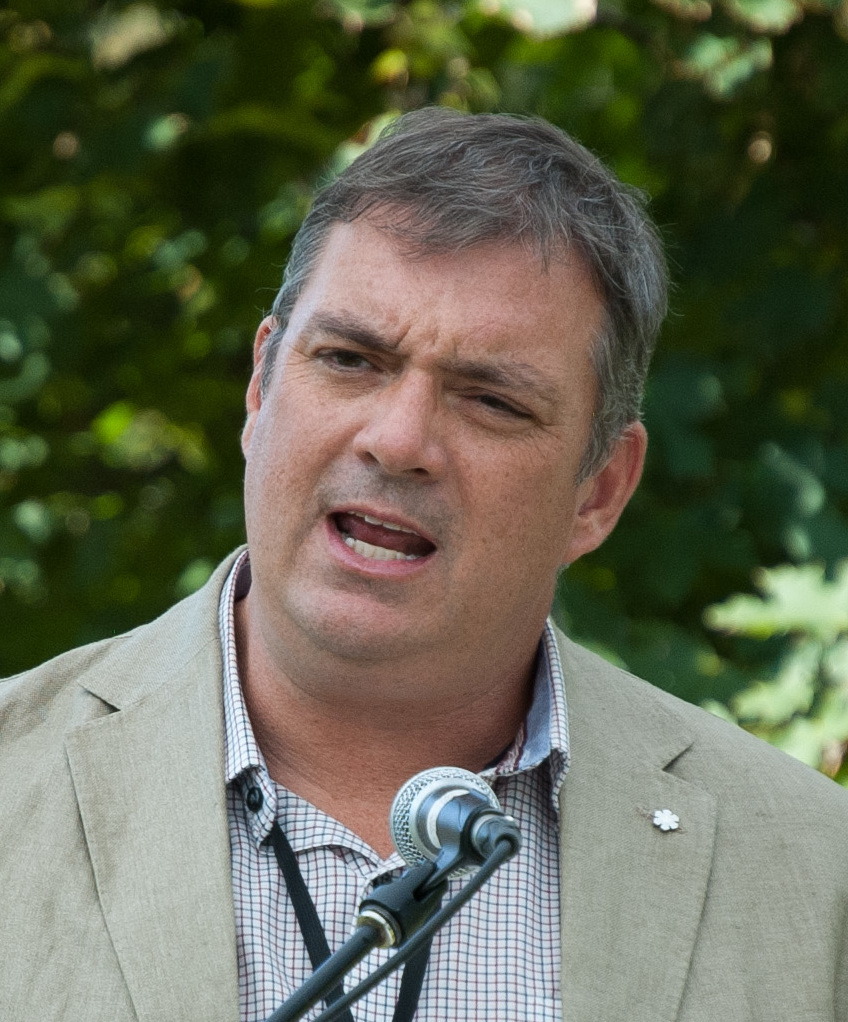
- Cook in 2017
- Born: November 10, 1971; Kingston, Ontario, Canada
- Died: October 25, 2025 (aged 53)
- Known for: Military history of Canada
- Awards: C.P. Stacey Prize (2000); Charles Taylor Prize (2009); Pierre Berton Award (2013); C.P. Stacey Prize (2015)

Academic background
- Education: Trent University; Royal Military College of Canada; University of New South Wales

Academic work
- Discipline: Military history
- Institutions: Canadian War Museum

Timothy Raleigh Brown Cook CM FRSC (November 10, 1971 – October 25, 2025) was a Canadian military historian and author. Cook was a historian at the Canadian War Museum and the author of thirteen books about the military history of Canada. Having written extensively about World War I, Cook's focus shifted to Canada's involvement in World War II with the 2014 publication of the first volume in a two-volume series chronicling Canada's role in that war. He won the Charles Taylor Prize in 2009 for his book Shock Troops. He was a two-time recipient (2000 and 2015) of the C.P. Stacey Prize, a two-time recipient of the J.W. Dafoe Book Prize, and a three-time winner of the Ottawa Book Prize. He was elected to the Royal Society of Canada in 2019. He was a member of the Order of Canada.

== Early life and education ==
Timothy Raleigh Brown Cook was born on November 10, 1971. His birthplace was Kingston, Ontario, and he was raised in Ottawa. His parents were Terry Cook, a noted archivist, and Sharon Anne Cook, a history professor and author. He studied history at Trent University in Peterborough, and later obtained a master's degree at the Royal Military College of Canada and a doctorate at the University of New South Wales.

== Career ==
He became an in-house historian at the Canadian War Museum, in Ottawa, specializing in the history of the First World War in 2002. In 2020, he was named the museum's chief historian and director of research.

He was a prolific writer on Canadian military history. His 2000 book, No Place to Run, was awarded the C.P. Stacey Prize for best written work in Canadian military history. In 2006, he published Clio's Warriors, which explores the writing of the world wars in Canada. At the Sharp End: Canadians Fighting the Great War, 1914–1916, won the 2007 J.W. Dafoe award for literary non-fiction and the 2008 Ottawa Book award. His 2008 book Shock Troops: Canadians Fighting the Great War 1917–1918 won the 2009 Charles Taylor Prize. The Madman and the Butcher: The Sensational Wars of Sam Hughes and General Arthur Currie was a finalist for the 2011 Shaughnessy Cohen Prize for Political Writing, the 2011 J.W. Dafoe prize, and the 2011 Ottawa Book Award. His 2012 book Warlords: Borden, Mackenzie King, and Canada's World Wars was a finalist for the 2013 Charles A. Taylor award for Literary Non-Fiction and the Canadian Authors Association Literary Award.

In 2014, his first book of a two volume set on the Second World War,The Necessary War, was published. It won the 2015 C.P. Stacey Prize for best book in Canadian Military History. Fight to the Finish received the 2016 Ottawa Book Award. In 2017, Cook published Vimy: Battle and Legend and in 2018 he published The Secret History of Soldiers: How Canadians Survived the Great War. Both were national best-sellers. Vimy received the 2017 J.W. Dafoe Book Prize and The Secret History received the Ottawa Book Prize. Almost all of these books have been national best sellers.

In June 2020, Cook and J.L. Granatstein edited Canada 1919: A Nation Shaped by War Hardcover (UBC Press) and in September 2020, he published The Fight for History: 75 Years of Forgetting, Remembering, and Remaking Canada's Second World War Hardcover (Allen Lane). In 2022, he published Lifesavers and Body Snatchers: Medical Care and the Struggle for Survival in the Great War. It was long-listed for the Templer prize; his Vimy book was a finalist for the same prize.

Cook was the recipient of the 2013 Pierre Berton Award (Governor General's History Award for Popular Media), which is awarded by Canada's National History Society. The award was given to Cook for his work making military history "more accessible, vivid and factual", both in his role as an author and as the First World War Historian at the Canadian War Museum.

Cook was a member of the Royal Society of Canada and the Order of Canada.

== Death ==
Cook died on October 25, 2025. He was 53. The Canadian War Museum announced Cook's death after he lost his 14-year battle with Hodgkin's disease.

== Published works ==
=== Books ===
- Tim Cook (November 1, 1999). No Place to Run: The Canadian Corps and Gas Warfare in the First World War. UBC Press. ISBN 978-0-7748-4180-1.
  (Winner of the 2000 C.P. Stacey Prize for most distinguished book in Canadian military history)
- Tim Cook (November 1, 2006). Clio's Warriors: Canadian Historians and the Writing of the World Wars. UBC Press. ISBN 978-0-7748-4125-2.
- Tim Cook (August 16, 2007). At the Sharp End Volume One: Canadians Fighting the Great War 1914–1916. Penguin Canada. ISBN 978-0-7352-3311-9.
  (Winner of the 2007 J.W. Dafoe award for literary non-fiction and of the 2008 Ottawa Book award)
  (Winner of the 2008 Ottawa Book Award)
- Tim Cook (August 16, 2008). Shock Troops. Penguin Canada. ISBN 978-0-7352-3310-2.
  (Winner of the 2009 Charles Taylor Prize for Literary Non-Fiction)
  (Finalist for the 2009 J.W. Dafoe award for Literary non-fiction)
  (Finalist for the 2009 Ottawa Book Award)
- Tim Cook (September 28, 2010). The Madman and the Butcher: The Sensational Wars Of Sam Hughes And General Arthur Currie. Penguin Canada. ISBN 978-0-14-317883-5.
  (Finalist for the 2011 Shaughnessy Cohen Prize for Political Writing)
  (Finalist for the 2011 J.W. Dafoe award for literary non-fiction)
  (Finalist for the 2011 Ottawa Book Award)
- Tim Cook (September 25, 2012). Warlords: Borden Mackenzie King And Canada's World Wars. Penguin Canada. ISBN 978-0-14-318667-0.
  (Finalist for the 2013 Charles A. Taylor award for Literary Non-Fiction)
  (Finalist for the Canadian Authors Association Literary Award)
- Tim Cook (September 9, 2014). The Necessary War. Penguin Canada. ISBN 978-0-14-319304-3.
  (Winner of the 2015 C.P. Stacey Prize for most distinguished book in Canadian military history)
  (Longlisted for the 2014 BC National Book Prize)
  (Longlisted for the 2014 RBC Taylor Award for Literary Non-Fiction)
  (Finalist for the 2014 J.W. Dafoe prize for literary non-fiction)
  (Finalist for the 2014 Canadian Authors Association Literary Award)
  (Finalist for 2014 Ottawa Book Award)
- Tim Cook (September 29, 2015). Fight to the Finish: Canadians in the Second World War, 1944–1945. Penguin Canada. ISBN 978-0-14-319612-9.
  (Winner of the 2016 Ottawa Book Award for Literary Non-Fiction)
- [with Jeff Noakes and Nic Clarke] Canada in the World Wars. London: André Deutsch, 2016.
- Tim Cook (March 7, 2017). Vimy: The Battle and the Legend. Penguin Canada. ISBN 978-0-7352-3317-1.
  (Winner of the 2018 J.W. Dafoe award for literary non-fiction)
  (Longlisted for the 2017 BC National Book Prize)
  (Finalist for the Templer Prize (UK))
  (Finalist for the Ottawa Book Award)
- Tim Cook (September 18, 2018). The Secret History of Soldiers: How Canadians Survived the Great War. Penguin Canada. ISBN 978-0-7352-3527-4.
  (Winner of the 2019 Ottawa Book Award for Literary Non-Fiction)
- [with J.L. Granatstein], Canada 1919: A Nation Shaped by War (June 2020, University of British Columbia Press)
- The Fight for History: 75 Years of Forgetting, Remembering, and Remaking Canada's Second World War (September 2020: Allen Lane)
- Lifesavers and Body Snatchers: Medical Care and the Struggle for Survival in the Great War. (April, 2022: Penguin Random House Canada).
- Tim Cook, We Were Freedom: Canadian Stories of the Second World War (Key Porter Books, 2010)
- WWI: The War That Shaped a Nation. Legion Magazine, 2011.
- Passchendaele. Legion Magazine, 2017.
- For King and Country: The South African and First World War. Exhibition Catalogue to Gallery II of the Canadian War Museum, 2017.
- [with J.L. Granatstein] Victory 1918: The Last Hundred Days. Exhibition catalogue, 2018.
- The Battle for Normandy. Legion Magazine, 2019.

=== Academic articles ===
- "The Blind Leading the Blind: The St. Eloi Battle of the Craters," Canadian Military History 4 (Fall 1996) 24–36
- "Creating Faith: The Canadian Gas Services in the First World War," Journal of Military History 62, (October 1998) 755–86
- "Through Clouded Eyes: Gas Masks in the First World War," Bulletin of Material History 47 (Spring 1998) 4–20
- "A Proper Slaughter: The March 1917 Gas Raid," Canadian Military History 8.2 (Spring 1999) 7–23
- "More as a medicine than a beverage": 'Demon Rum' and the Canadian Trench Soldier in the First World War, Canadian Military History 9.1 (Winter 2000) 7–22
- "Against God-Inspired Conscience: Perceptions of Gas Warfare as a Weapon of Mass Destruction, 1915–1939," War & Society 18.1 (May 2000) 47–69
- "Clio's Soldiers: Charles Stacey and the Army Historical Officers in the Second World War," The Canadian Historical Review 83.1 (March 2002) 29–57
- "From Destruction to Construction: The Khaki University of Canada, 1917–1919," Journal of Canadian Studies 37.1 (Spring 2002) 109–143
- "Archives and Privacy in a Wired World: The Impact of the Personal Information Act (Bill C-6) on Archives," Archivaria 53 (Spring 2002) 94–115
- "Dying like so many rats in a trap": Gas warfare and the Great War soldier," The Army Doctrine and Training Bulletin, 5.4 (Winter 2002–2003) 47–56
- Documenting War & Forging Reputations: Sir Max Aitken and the Canadian War Records Office in the First World War, War In History 10 (3), 2003, 265–295
- Literary Memorials: The Great War Regimental Histories, 1919–1939, Journal of the Canadian Historical Association (Toronto 2002) 167–190
- Wet Canteens and Worrying Mothers: Soldiers and Temperance Groups in the Great War, Social History 35.70 (June 2003) 311–330
- The Butcher and the Madman: Sir Arthur Currie, Sir Sam Hughes and the War of Reputations, The Canadian Historical Review 85.4 (December 2004) 693–719
- Canada's Great War on Film: Lest We Forget (1935) Canadian Military History 14.3 (Summer 2005) 5–20
- "Quill and Canon: Writing the Great War in Canada," The American Review of Canadian Studies (Autumn 2005) 503–530
- "'My Whole Heart and Soul is in this War': The Letters and War Service of Sergeant G.L. Ormsby," Canadian Military History 15.1 (Winter 2006) 51–63
- The Politics of Surrender: Canadian soldiers and the Killing of Prisoners in the Great War, Journal of Military History 70.3 (July 2006) 637–665
  Winner of the 2006 Moncado Award
- [with Natascha Morrison] "Longing and Loss from Canada's Great War," Canadian Military History 16.1 (Winter 2007) 53–60
- "Anti-heroes of the Canadian Expeditionary Force," Journal of the Canadian Historical Association 19.1 (2008) 171–193
- 'He was determined to go:' Underage Soldiers in the Canadian Expeditionary Force, Histoire sociale - Social History 41.81 (May 2008) 41–74
- [with Eric Brown], "The Hendershot Brothers in the Great War," Canadian Military History 18.2 (Spring 2009) 41–56
- "The Singing War: Soldiers' Songs in the Great War," American Review of Canadian Studies 39.3 (September 2009) 224–241
- "The Ten Most Important Books of Canadian Military History," Canadian Military History, 18.4 (Autumn 2009) 65–74
- [with Christopher Schultz] New Theatres of War: An Analysis of Paul Gross's Passchendaele, Canadian Military History, 19.3 (Summer 2010) 51–56
- "The Ten Most Important War Films," Canadian Military History, Volume 19, Number 3, (Summer 2010) 73–79
- [with Eric Brown] "The 1936 Vimy Pilgrimage," Canadian Military History 20.2 (Spring 2011) 37–54
- "'Our first duty is to win, at any cost': Sir Robert Borden during the Great War," Journal of Military and Strategic Studies 13.3 (Spring 2011) 1–24
- "'Tokens of Fritz': Canadian Soldiers and the Art of Souveneering in the Great War," War & Society 31.3 (October 2012) 211–226
- "Fighting Words: Canadian Soldiers' Slang and Swearing in the Great War," accepted and awaiting publication in War in History 20.3 (July 2013) 323–344
- "Grave Beliefs: Stories of the Supernatural and the Uncanny among Canada's Great War Trench Soldiers," The Journal of Military History 77/2 (2013) 521–542
- "'I will meet the world with a smile and a joke': Canadian Soldiers' Humour in the Great War," Canadian Military History 22.2 (Spring 2013)
- "Canada and the Great War," RUSI Journal 159.4 (August–September 2014) 56–64
- "Battles of the Imagined Past: Canada's Great War and Memory," The Canadian Historical Review 95.3 (2014) 414–423
- "Spatial Sanctuaries and Normalizing Violence: The Canadian Soldier on the Western Front during the Great War." Journal of Canadian Studies 49.3 (Fall 2015) 5–22
- Tim Cook: Seven articles in the "First World War collection" Articles by Tim Cook at The Canadian Encyclopedia, accessed September 10, 2019; including "Gas Warfare"
  - Tim Cook: Six articles in the "Second World War collection", ibidem
- [with William Stewart] "Death in the Canadian Expeditionary Force," 1914-18 Encyclopedia online. 1914–1918 Online
- [with Mark Humphries] Newfoundlanders and the Gallipoli Campaign, at "Canadian Military History" #27. 1 (2018) pp 1–40
  - [with Anna England] Munnings and the Canadians in the First World War, at "Canadian Military History". #27, 2. 2018, pp 1–26

Chapters in Books

- Immortalizing the Canadian Soldier: Lord Beaverbrook, the Canadian War Records Office in the First World War, Briton Busch (ed.) Canada and the Great War: Western Front Association papers (McGill-Queen's University Press, 2003) 46–65
- "More as a medicine than a beverage": 'Demon Rum' and the Canadian Trench Soldier in the First World War, in J.M. Bumsted and Lent Kuffert, Interpreting Canada's Past - A Post-Confederation Reader, Third Edition (Oxford University Press, 2004)
- "The Gunners at Vimy: 'We are Hammering Fritz to Pieces,'" Geoff Hayes, Michael Bechthold, and Andrew Iarocci, eds., Vimy Ridge: A Canadian Reassessment (Waterloo: 2007)
- "Storm Troops: Combat Effectiveness and the Canadian Corps in 1917," in Peter Dennis and Jeffrey Grey (eds.) 1917: Tactics, Training and Technology (Canberra: Army History Unit, 2007) 43–61
- "Bloody Victory: The Canadian Corps in the Hundred Days Campaign," Ashley Ekins (ed.) 1918 Year of Victory: The End of the Great War and the Shaping of History (Canberra: Exisle publishing, 2010) 161–181
- "Black-hearted Traitors, Crucified Martyrs, and the Leaning Virgin: The Role of Rumor and the Great War Canadian Soldier," in Michael Neiberg and Jennifer Keene (ed) Finding Common Ground: New Directions in First World War Studies (Leiden: Brill Academic Publishers, 2010) 21–42
- "'He was determined to go': Underage Soldiers in the Canadian Expeditionary Force," in J.M. Bumsted, Len Kuffert, Michel Ducharme (eds.) Interpreting Canada's Past: A Post-Confederation Reader, 4th Edition (Oxford University Press, 2011)
- "Warrior Nation," in Imagining Canada: A Century of Photographs from the New York Times (Doubleday, 2012) 48–62
- "Life in the Trenches," in Mark Reid (ed.) Canada's Great War Album (2014)
- "Trench Culture," in Mark Reid (ed.) Canada's Great War Album (2014)
- "Animals in War," [with Andrew Iarocci] in Mark Reid (ed.) Canada's Great War Album (2014)
- "'He was determined to go': Underage Soldiers in the Canadian Expeditionary Force," in Mona Gleason and Tamara Myers (eds), The Difference Kids Make: Bringing Children and Childhood into Canadian History (University of Toronto Press, 2015)
- "Forged in Fire: John McCrae in the Great War," in Amanda Betts (ed.) In Flanders Fields: 100 Years (Toronto: Knopf Canada, 2015) 17–58

Tim Cook, ""Dr. Jekyll and Mr. Hyde: Canadian Medical Officers in the Great War," in Stephen Craig and Dale C. Smith (eds.) Glimpsing Modernity: Military Medicine in World War I (Brill: Publication 2016) 34–59

- "The Fire Plan," in Doug Delaney and Serge Durflinger, Capturing Hill 70 Canada's Forgotten Battle of the First World War (Vancouver: UBC Press, 2016) 102–136
- "Medicine in the Great War," in Caitlin Bailey (ed.) The First World War in Colour (Dundurn, 2018)
- "The Canadian Corps and the Hundred Days Campaign," in Peter Liddle (ed.) Britain and Victory in the Great War (London: Pen and Sword, 2018)
- "Who Were the Canadian Soldiers?," in Stephen Black (ed.) Sir Alfred Munnings and the First World War (2018)
