= Legion Magazine =

Canadian magazine

- Editor: Aaron Kylie
- Frequency: Bimonthly
- Publisher: Canvet Publications Ltd.
- First issue: 1926
- Country: Canada
- Based in: Kanata, Ontario
- Language: English, French
- Website: legionmagazine.com
- ISSN: 1209-4331

Legion Magazine is a Canadian magazine that publishes articles on "Canadian Military history and veteran affairs". The magazine was first published as The Legionary in May 1926, as the official journal of the Royal Canadian Legion. It is published by Canvet Publications Ltd., which is the publishing arm of the Royal Canadian Legion.

In 2013, the magazine was a finalist for the Governor General's History Award for Excellence in Popular Media - The Pierre Berton Award. The award was ultimately won by Canadian War Museum historian Tim Cook, a prolific author who had also written for Legion Magazine.

Other notable historians who have written for the magazine include Wilfrid Laurier professor Terry Copp.
