= W. A. B. Douglas =

Canadian naval historian

Director of Directorate of History, National Defence Headquarters (Canada)
- In office 1973–1993

Director general history
- In office 1993–94

Personal details
- Born: June 4, 1929 (age 95)

William Alexander Binny "Alec" Douglas (born 4 June 1929) is a Canadian naval historian, who was director of Directorate of History, National Defence Headquarters (Canada), 1973–1993, then director general history, 1993–94.

== Early life and education ==
Born in Salisbury, Southern Rhodesia, the son of a British engineer working in Southern Rhodesia, Douglas left as a youngster for England and after the outbreak of World War II was evacuated to Canada with other children during the "Blitz". Reaching college age while in Canada, he joined the Canadian University Naval Training Divisions to help finance his undergraduate education at the University of Toronto, where he received his Bachelor of Arts degree in 1951.

== Career ==
After training in HMCS Ottawa (DDH 229) and HMCS Swansea (K328) in 1951–1954, Douglas qualified for lieutenant with the Royal Navy, then served as a watchkeeping officer in HMCS Quebec (C66), HMCS Penetang (K676), and HMCS Outremont (K322) between 1955 and 1957. He then served as navigating and operations officer in HMCS Ottawa (DDH 229) and HMCS Kootenay (DDE 258) in 1958–1960. Assigned to staff duty in 1960, he became navigation equipment and trials officer on the staff of Flag Officer, Atlantic Coast, then, as a lieutenant commander became squadron navigator and operations officer with the 7th Canadian Escort Squadron in 1961–1964. During this period, he earned a Master of Arts degree in history at Dalhousie University in 1962, with a thesis on "Halifax as an element of sea power, 1749–1766". In 1964, he was posted as naval staff officer and associate professor of military studies at the Royal Military College of Canada. In 1967 he was assigned as an historian at the Directorate of History, National Defence Headquarters, in Ottawa. Promoted to commander in 1970, he became senior historian in the Directorate. During this period he completed graduate studies at Queen's University under Sydney F. Wise, earning a Ph.D. in 1973 with a thesis on "Nova Scotia and the Royal Navy, 1713–1766". After retiring from active service in 1973, he was appointed director of Directorate of History, National Defence Headquarters, serving until 1993, becoming director general history, in 1993–94.

Among his appointments, he was a member of the Public Service Commission Committee of Peers for the Canadian Government Historical Research Group, 1973–1994; national commissioner of Canadian National Commission for Military History; chairman of Canadian Commission for the History of the Second World War, 1973–1984; vice president, 1976–1981, and member of council of North American Society for Oceanic History, 1973–1985; director of Ontario Historical Society, 1975–1983; secretary, 1984–89, and president, 1990–1993 of Canadian Nautical Research Society; adjunct professor at Carleton University, 1985– ; visiting professor of history at Duke University, 1988–89, 2001–02; vice-president of International Commission for Maritime History, 1995–2000; visiting research fellow at Clare Hall, Cambridge, 1996.

In 1988 he was the first recipient, along with Norman Hillmer, of the C.P. Stacey Prize for their work The Official History of the Royal Canadian Air Force, Volume II: The Creation of a National Air Force.

== Publications ==
- Out of the Shadows: Canada in the Second World War by W A B Douglas and Brereton Greenhous. (Toronto; New York: Oxford University Press, 1977).
- Gunfire on the Lakes: The Naval War of 1812–1814 on the Great Lakes and Lake Champlain = Canonnades sur les lacs: la guerre navale de 1812–1814 sur les Grands Lacs et le lac Champlain. (Ottawa: National Museum of Man, 1977).
- Douglas, W. A. B. (1986). The Creation of a National Air Force. Official History of the Royal Canadian Air Force. Vol. II. Toronto: University of Toronto Press in Co-operation with the Dept. of National Defence and the Canadian Govt. Pub. Centre, Supply and Services. ISBN 0-80202-584-6.
- The RCN in Transition, 1910–1985, edited by W.A.B. Douglas (Vancouver : University of British Columbia Press, 1988).
- No Higher Purpose The official operational history of the Royal Canadian Navy in the Second World War, 1939–1943, by W.A.B. Douglas, et al. v. 2, pt. 1. (St. Catharines, Ont.: Vanwell, 2002).
- A Blue Water Navy The official operational history of the Royal Canadian Navy in the Second World War, 1943–1945, volume II, part 2 (St. Catharines, Ont.: Vanwell, 2007).
