= Jean-Jacques Martel =

Canadian politician

Member of Parliament for Chapleau
- In office March 1958 – June 1962
- Preceded by: Charles-Noël Barbès
- Succeeded by: Gérard Laprise

Personal details
- Born: 3 January 1927 Baie-du-Febvre, Quebec, Canada
- Died: c. 3 February 2005 (aged 78)
- Party: Progressive Conservative
- Profession: insurance broker

Jean-Jacques Martel (3 January 1927 – c. 3 February 2005) was a Progressive Conservative party member of the House of Commons of Canada. He was an insurance broker by career.

Martel was born at Baie-du-Febvre, Quebec. In 1954, he helped establish Northern Mining Explorations Ltd., or MDN (TSX: MDN).

After an unsuccessful bid for the Chapleau riding in the 1957 federal election, Martel was elected there in the 1958 election. He served for one term, the 24th Canadian Parliament, until he was defeated by Gérard Laprise of the Social Credit party in the 1962 election.

He made one further attempt to return to Parliament in the 1979 election at Abitibi but placed third behind Liberal candidate Ronald Tetrault and the Social Credit winner Armand Caouette.

Martel's death was announced by Northern Mining on 3 February 2005. Marc Lemay, Member of Parliament for Abitibi-Témiscamingue, paid tribute in the House of Commons early the following week.
