= Indigenous Services Canada =

Government department

- Services aux Autochtones Canada
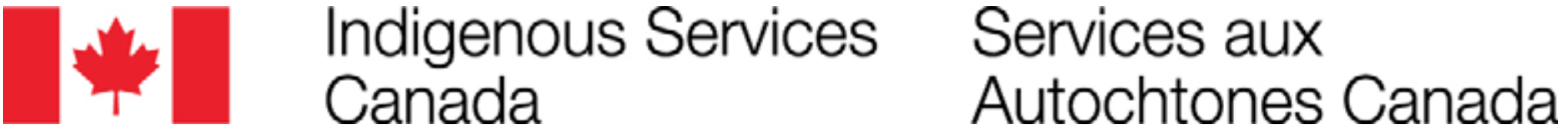

Department overview
- Formed: 2019
- Preceding Department: Department of Indian Affairs and Northern Development
- Jurisdiction: Canada
- Minister responsible: Mandy Gull-Masty, Minister of Indigenous Services
- Deputy Minister responsible: Michelle Kovacevic
- Website: www.sac-isc.gc.ca

Indigenous Services Canada (ISC; French: Services aux Autochtones Canada; SAC) (Note: Indigenous Services Canada is the applied title under the Federal Identity Program; the legal title is Department of Indigenous Services (French: Ministère des Services aux Autochtones).) is one of two departments in the Government of Canada with responsibility for policies relating to Indigenous peoples in Canada (the other being Crown–Indigenous Relations and Northern Affairs Canada). ISC's mandate is to work "collaboratively with partners to improve access to high quality services for First Nations, Inuit and Métis."

The department was created in 2019 following the dissolution of the Department of Indian Affairs and Northern Development. ISC is responsible to Parliament through the minister of Indigenous services (Mandy Gull-Masty since 2025). While the minister is head of the department, and provides policy/political direction, the day-to-day operations of the department are managed by the deputy minister (currently Michelle Kovacevic), who is a public servant. Its headquarters is in Terrasses de la Chaudière, in downtown Gatineau, Quebec.

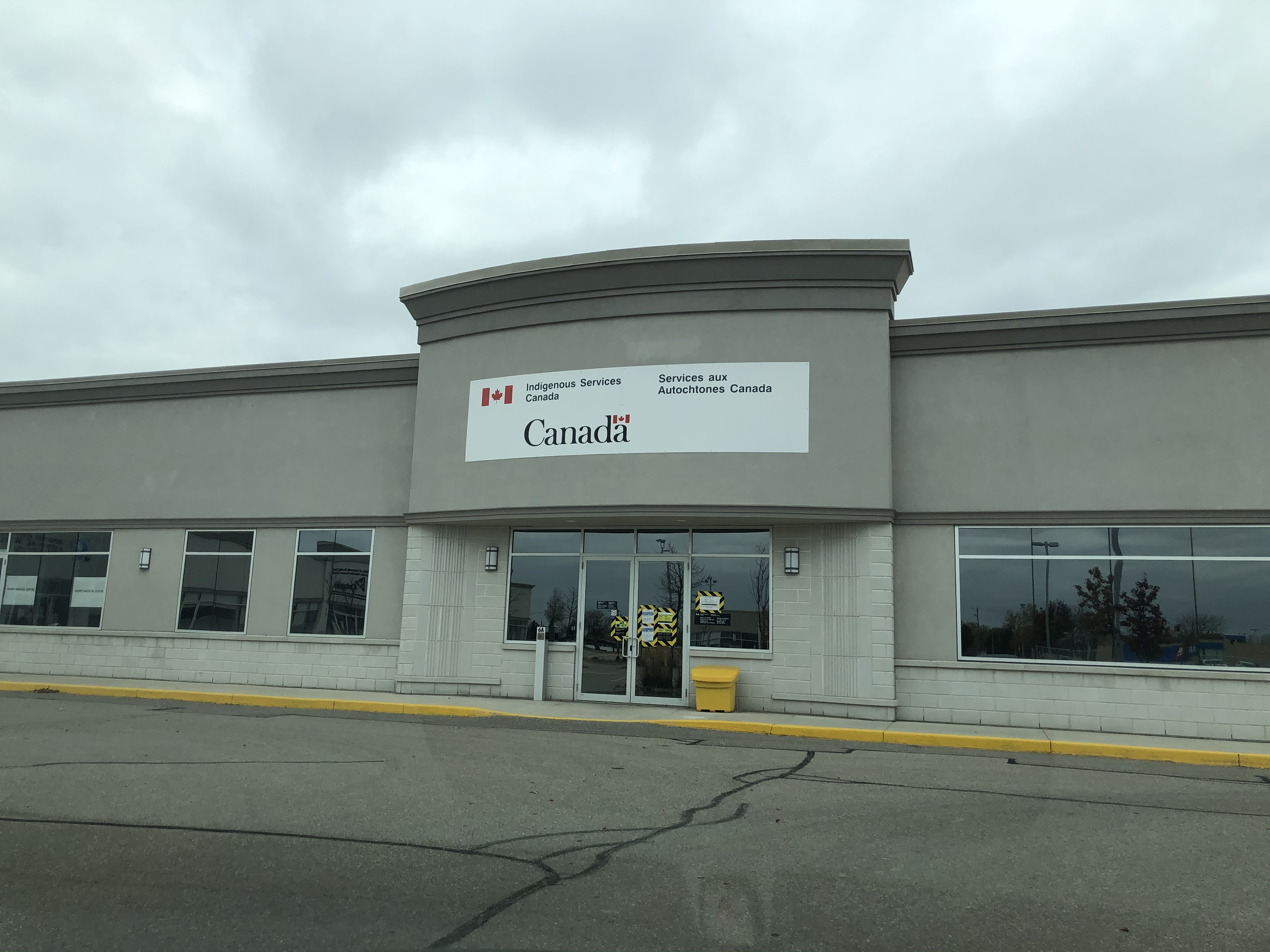
An ISC service centre in Brantford, Ontario

== Restructuring of the former Department of Indian Affairs and Northern Development ==
In August 2017, the Trudeau ministry announced the dissolution of the Department of Indian Affairs and Northern Development and announced that it would be replaced by the Department of Indigenous Services and the Department of Crown-Indigenous Relations and Northern Affairs. This came into effect as of July 15, 2019. The transition was not instantaneous, with Orders-in-Council initially separating the portfolios, and formal legislation constituting the new departments being passed in July 2019.

According to Trudeau, the rationale behind the restructuring was that "the structures in place at Indigenous and Northern Affairs Canada were created at a time where the approach around the Indian Act, the approach around our engagement with indigenous peoples, was very much looked at in a paternalistic, colonial way". The new departments are consistent with the 1996 Royal Commission on Aboriginal Peoples' recommendations to improve the delivery of services dramatically and fast-track self-government.

== Community infrastructure ==
By January 2012, there were two government audits that revealed that the federal government had earmarked about a billion dollars annually on constructing and/or maintaining First Nations infrastructure in First Nations communities.

"Findings from the "AFN First Nations Regional Longitudinal Health Survey 2002/2003 study (March 2007) are notable: More than 1/5 of adult respondents report that they have no access to garbage collection services; Nine percent of homes do not have either sewage service or a septic tank; and Only 2/3 of respondents considered their water safe to drink: Over 60 percent of respondents obtain their drinking water from bottled water. To cite a 2003 INAC study, 39 percent of water systems exceeded one or more of the risk indicator thresholds occasionally or continuously. Among key informants, there was unanimous consensus that there is a clear infrastructure deficit on reserve and in the different categories, according to the community; investment needed in housing, school, water facilities, and roads were usually mentioned as examples."

Community Infrastructure $1.028 billion

=== First Nations Infrastructure Fund (FNIF) ===
FNIF $234 million (lifespan)

The First Nations Infrastructure Fund (FNIF) was introduced in 2007 to improve the quality of life and the environment for First Nation communities. It is a targeted fund that accepted proposals for community projects under the following headings: 1) Planning and Skills Development, 2) Solid Waste Management, 3) Roads and Bridges 4) Energy Systems 5) Connectivity. The amount available to each community through the First Nations Infrastructure Fund (FNIF) was limited to a total of $10 million over a five-year period. By March 2008, a total of 262 proposals (out of the 714 submitted) were approved for FNIF funding. Nationally, $94.3 million of FNIF funding was dispersed.

First Nations Water and Wastewater Action Plan (FNWWAP) $2.5 billion (lifespan)7 N/A

== Infrastructure crisis in First Nations communities ==
=== Crisis in water supply, distribution systems and wastewater systems ===
In 2005, the Office of the Auditor General of Canada "reported the lack of a legislative regime to ensure that water quality on reserves met the Guidelines for Canadian Drinking Water Quality, despite the existence of such a regime in every province and territory (OAG 2011 page 11)." The auditor general's report (2011-06) noted that INAC and Health Canada "do not ensure that drinking water is tested on a regular basis."

==== National assessment of water and wastewater systems in First Nation communities ====
In 1991, less than 80% of on-reserve housing had basic water and sewer services. (NAWWSFNS 2003:26)

By 2001, about 98% of on-reserve houses had water and 94% had sewer services. (NAWWSFNS 2003:26)

The report dated May 2003 revealed that "of the 740 community water systems assessed, about 29% posed a potentially high risk that could negatively impact water quality (p. i. ) Only 25% were in the low or no risk category. Of the 462 community wastewater systems assessed, 16% (74) were classified at a potentially high risk that could negatively impact wastewater effluent quality. (p. ii.) Circuit Rider Training Program began in 2000. "The capital cost to address deficiencies to water and wastewater systems was estimated between $475 million and $560 million in 2003. The capital investment to provide basic water and wastewater services to about 5,300 homes which did not have basic water and wastewater services would have cost $185 million in 2003. Support for normal recapitalization and expansion for growth was estimated at $90 million to $100 million annually. p.iii)

"The National Assessment released in April 2011 was the result of "the most rigorous and comprehensive evaluation of water and wastewater systems on reserve ever undertaken. Between July 2009 and spring 2011, independent engineers inspected 4000 on-reserve systems including 1,300 water and wastewater systems and more than 800 wells and 1,900 septic fields serving 571 First Nation communities."

The National Assessment of Water and Wastewater Systems in First Nation Communities (2011) "found that 39 per cent of First Nations water systems were at high risk of being unsafe, affecting 25 per cent of people living on reserves. It said Ottawa would need $1.2 billion in repairs, better infrastructure and training to fix the problem, as well as an additional $4.7 billion over 10 years to keep pace with growing demand."

39% of the 807 water systems inspected were classified as high overall risk affecting 25 per cent of the on-reserve population base. The study found that "314 water systems were high risk, 161 water systems in 116 First Nation communities were under Health Canada Drinking-Water Advisories (DWA) as of February 2011. These DWAs may be impacting up to 18,900 people, which is approximately 3.9 percent of the total on-reserve population cited as 484,321 in the National Roll-up."

The National Assessment of Water and Wastewater Systems in First Nation Communities 'suggests many communities remain vulnerable to the health and environmental problems that result from poor water quality and inadequate sanitation. The assessment, which was released in April 2011, looked at the water and sewer systems of 571 First Nations (with a total population of 484,321 and 112,836 "dwellings") and evaluated their water source and how well each system was designed, operated and monitored. It categorized 39 per cent of the water systems as "high risk," meaning they have "major deficiencies" that pose a high risk to water quality and could lead to potential health and safety or environmental concerns. Thirty-four per cent were assessed as posing medium risk to the quality of water and health and having deficiencies that "should be corrected to avoid future problems."
