= Cabinet of Canada =

Canadian body of ministers of the Crown

Canadian Ministry
- Conseil des ministres

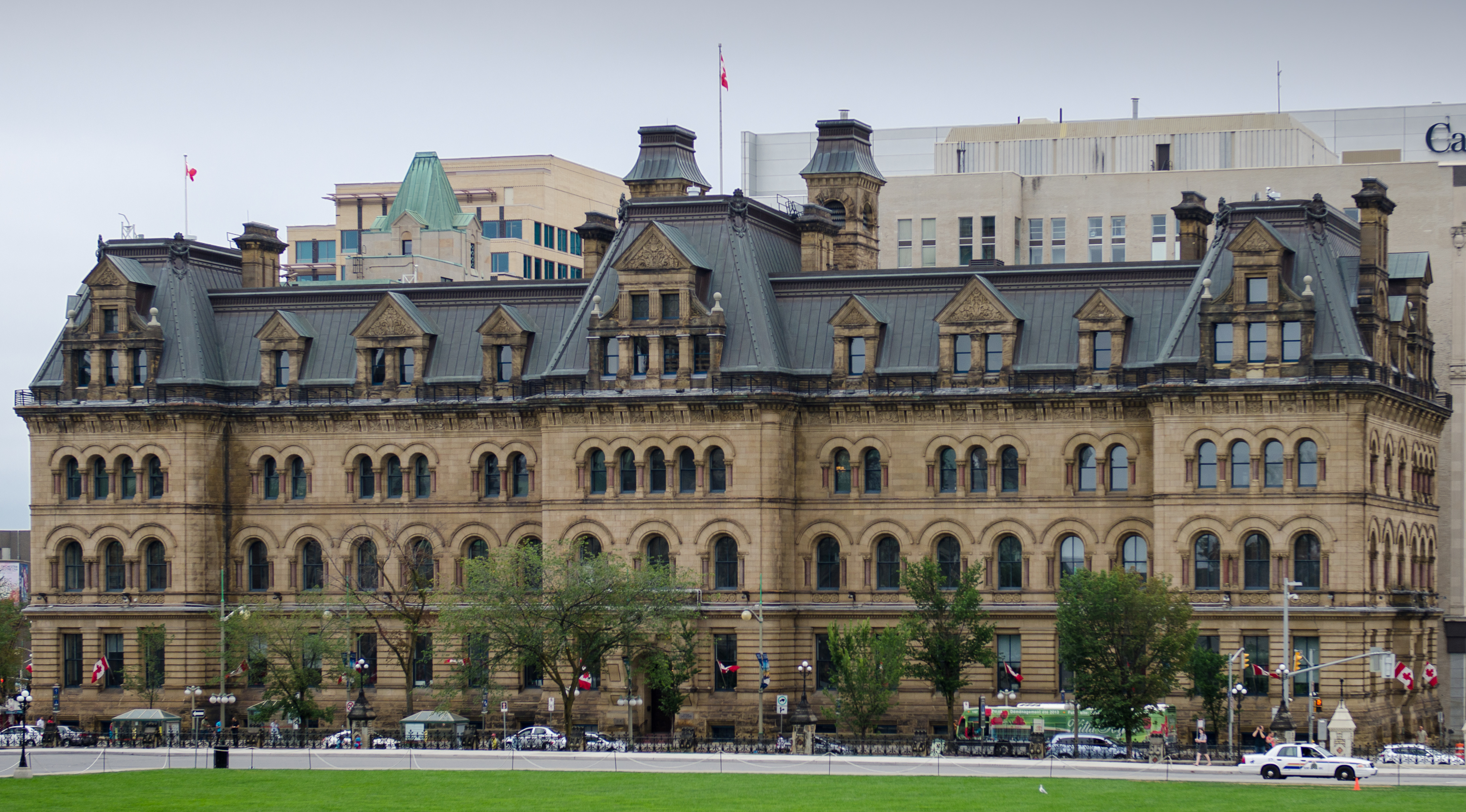
- Langevin Block is the principal meeting place of the Canadian Ministry
- Formation: July 1, 1867; 159 years ago
- Type: Committee of the King’s Privy Council for Canada (Ministers of the Crown)
- Location: 80 Wellington Street, Ottawa, Ontario, Canada
- Prime Minister of Canada: Mark Carney
- President of the King's Privy Council for Canada: Dominic LeBlanc
- Main organ: Priorities and Planning Committee
- Parent organization: King's Privy Council for Canada
- Subsidiaries: National Security Council; Treasury Board of Canada
- Website: www.pm.gc.ca/en/cabinet
- Formerly called: Executive Council of the Province of Canada

The Canadian Ministry (French: Conseil des ministres, lit. 'Council of Ministers'), colloquially referred to as the Cabinet of Canada (Cabinet du Canada), is a body of ministers of the Crown that, along with the Canadian monarch, and within the tenets of the Westminster system, forms the government of Canada. Chaired by the prime minister, the Cabinet is officially a committee of the King's Privy Council for Canada and the senior echelon of the Ministry, the membership of the Cabinet and Ministry often being co-terminal; as of March 2025 there were no members of the latter who were not also members of the former.

For practical reasons, the Cabinet is informally referred to either in relation to the prime minister in charge of it or the number of ministries since Confederation. The current Cabinet is the Cabinet of Mark Carney, which is part of the 30th Ministry. The interchangeable use of the terms cabinet and ministry is a subtle inaccuracy that can cause confusion.

== Composition ==
=== Governor-in-Council ===
The Government of Canada, formally referred to as His Majesty's Government, is defined by the constitution as the King acting on the advice of his Privy Council; what is technically known as the Governor-in-Council, referring to the governor general as the King's delegate. However, the Privy Council—composed mostly of former members of parliament, current and former chief justices of Canada, and other elder statesmen—rarely meets in full; as the stipulations of responsible government require that those who directly advise the monarch and governor general on how to exercise the Royal Prerogative be accountable to the elected House of Commons, the day-to-day operation of government is guided only by a sub-group of the Privy Council made up of individuals who hold seats in Parliament. This body of ministers of the Crown is the Cabinet, which has come to be the council in the phrase King-in-Council.

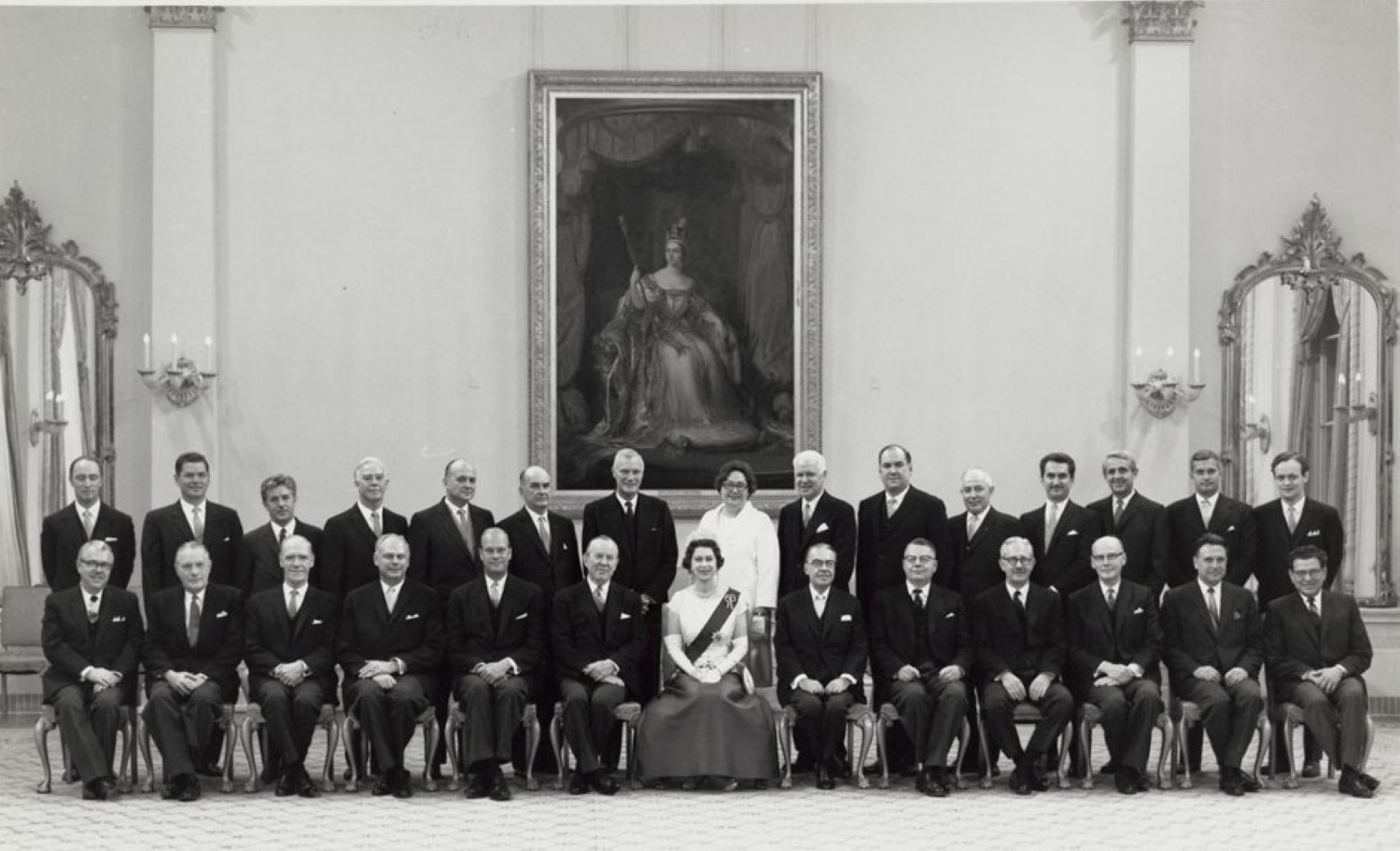
Elizabeth II, Queen of Canada, with her Cabinet, chaired by Prime Minister Lester B. Pearson, part of the 19th Canadian Ministry (Elizabeth's third), at Rideau Hall, July 1, 1967

In the context of constitutional monarchy and responsible government, the ministerial advice tendered is typically binding, but the royal prerogative belongs to the Crown, not to any of the ministers, and the royal and viceregal figures may unilaterally use these powers in exceptional constitutional crisis situations. (Note: Eugene Forsey said of this: "in Canada, the head of state can, in exceptional circumstances, protect Parliament and the people against a prime minister and ministers who may forget that 'minister' means 'servant' and may try to make themselves masters. For example, the head of state could refuse to let a Cabinet dissolve a newly elected House of Commons before it could even meet, or could refuse to let ministers bludgeon the people into submission by a continuous series of general elections," and Larry Zolf commented: "The governor general must take all steps necessary to thwart the will of a ruthless prime minister prematurely calling for the death of a Parliament." Robert E. Hawkins summed up, "the governor general's role in times of crisis is to ensure that normal democratic discourse can resume. Examples of such actions took place during the viceregal service of the Viscount Byng of Vimy, John C. Bowen, Frank Lindsay Bastedo, and Judith Guichon.) There are also a few duties which must be specifically performed by, or bills that require assent by, the King. Royal assent has never been denied to a bill passed by the federal Parliament.

One of the main duties of the Crown is to appoint as prime minister the individual most likely to maintain the confidence of the House of Commons; this is usually the leader of the political party with a plurality of seats in that house. But, when no party or coalition holds a majority (referred to as a hung parliament), or similar scenario, the governor general's judgment about the most suitable candidate for prime minister must be brought into play. The prime minister thereafter heads the Cabinet. The King is informed by his viceroy of the acceptance of the resignation of a prime minister and the swearing-in of a new ministry and he remains fully briefed through regular communications from his Canadian ministers and holds audience with them whenever possible.

=== Selection and structure ===
The governor general appoints to the Cabinet persons chosen by the prime minister—John A. Macdonald once half-jokingly listed his occupation as cabinet maker. While there are no legal qualifications of the potential ministers, there are a number of conventions that are expected to be followed. For instance, there is typically a minister from each province, ministers from visible minority, with disability and Indigenous groups, female ministers, and, while the majority of those chosen to serve as ministers of the Crown are members of Parliament, a cabinet sometimes includes a senator, especially as a representative of a province or region where the governing party won few or no ridings. Efforts are further made to indulge interest groups that support the incumbent government and the party's internal politics must be appeased. It is not legally necessary for Cabinet members to have a position in parliament although they are almost always selected from the House of Commons.

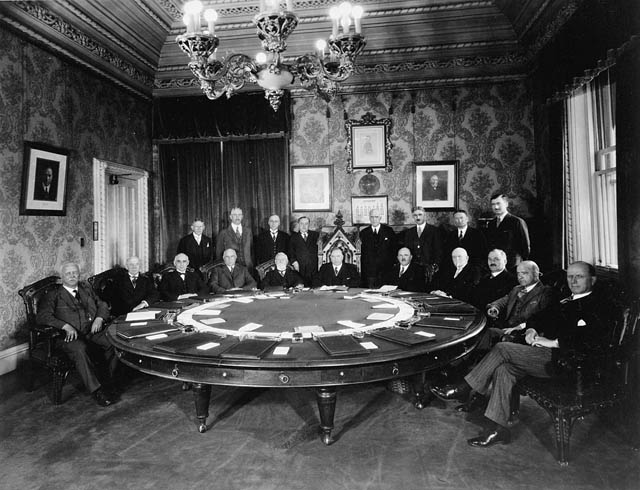
A meeting of the Cabinet of William Lyon Mackenzie King in 1930

As with other Westminster-derived governments, but unlike the United States Cabinet, the size and structure of the Canadian Cabinet is relatively malleable, the slate of Cabinet positions tending to be substantially restructured periodically, the last major period of realignment occurring between 1993 and 1996. Throughout the 20th century, cabinets had been expanding in size until the Cabinet chaired by Brian Mulroney, with a population of 40 ministers. Mulroney's successor, Kim Campbell, reduced this number and Jean Chrétien eliminated approximately 10 members of the ministry from the Cabinet, so that, by 1994, there were a total of 23 persons in Cabinet. Under the chairmanship of Paul Martin, the number increased again to 39, in the vicinity of which it has remained. The Trudeau Cabinet comprised 37 ministers in 2021.

Cabinet itself—or full Cabinet—is further divided into committees. The Treasury Board, overseeing the expenditure of the sovereign's state funds within every department, is one of the most important of these. The structure of Cabinet fluctuates between and within ministries. For example, the Priorities and Planning Committee, often referred to as the inner Cabinet, was the body that set the strategic directions for the government under Stephen Harper, approving key appointments and ratifying committee memberships. This committee ceased to exist under Justin Trudeau. Other Cabinet committees common across committee structures include operations, social affairs, a committee focused on economic growth, foreign affairs and security, the environment, and energy security. Each committee is chaired by a senior minister whose own portfolio may intersect with the mandate of the committee.

=== Ministers, secretaries, and deputies ===
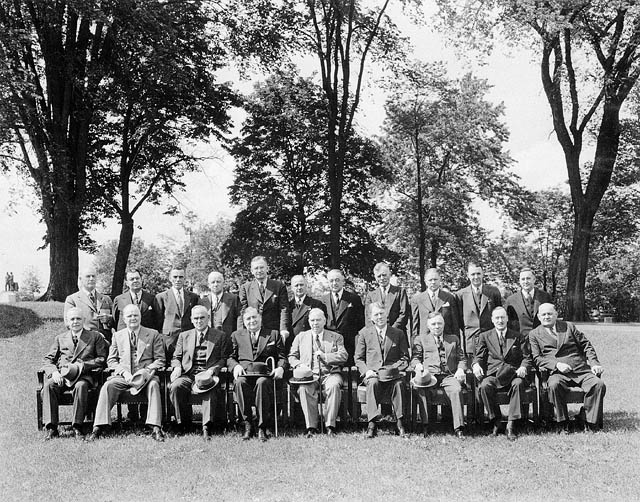
The 16th Canadian Ministry, headed by William Lyon Mackenzie King, on the grounds of Rideau Hall, June 19, 1945

Each minister of the Crown is responsible for the general administration of at least one government portfolio and heads a corresponding ministry or ministries, known in Canada as departments or agencies. The most important minister, following the first minister, is the minister of finance, while other high-profile ministries include foreign affairs, industry, justice, and health. The official order of precedence does not follow the same pattern, however, with ministers being listed in the order of their appointment to the Privy Council; if appointed on the same day, the individuals are placed in order of their election or appointment to Parliament.

Unique positions in Cabinet are those such as leader of the government in the House of Commons and president of the King's Privy Council, who have no corresponding department and some ministers, such as the minister for international cooperation, head agencies under the umbrella of a department run by another minister. Further, the prime minister may recommend the governor general appoint to Cabinet some ministers without portfolio, which was last done in 2021, when Prime Minister Trudeau advised the appointment of Jim Carr as Special Representative to the Prairies. Unlike in many other Westminster model governments, ministers of state in Canada are considered full members of Cabinet, rather than of the ministry outside it, which has the effect of making the Canadian Cabinet much larger than its foreign counterparts. These individuals are assigned specific, but temporary, responsibilities on a more ad hoc basis, fulfilling tasks created and dissolved to suit short-term government priorities from within a department under a full minister of the Crown. Ministers of state may also be named, but not specified any particular responsibilities, thus giving them the effective appearance of ministers without portfolio, or be delegated problems or initiatives that cut across departmental boundaries, a situation usually described as having the [situation] file.

Members of the Cabinet receive assistance from both parliamentary secretaries—who will usually answer, on behalf of a minister, questions in the House of Commons—and deputy ministers—senior civil servants assigned to each ministry in order to tender non-partisan advice.

== Responsibilities ==
Composed of advisors to the sovereign, the Cabinet has significant power in the Canadian system and, as the governing party usually holds a majority of seats in the legislature, almost all bills proposed by the Cabinet are enacted. Combined with a comparatively small proportion of bills originating with individual members of Parliament, this leads to Cabinet having almost total control over the legislative agenda of the House of Commons. Further, under the constitution, all legislation involving the raising or spending of public revenue must originate from the Cabinet.

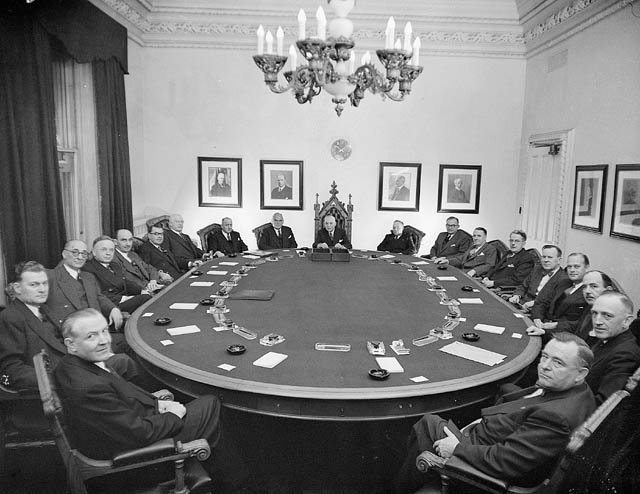
A meeting of Cabinet chaired by Prime Minister Louis St Laurent, in the Privy Council Chamber, April 1953

Members of various executive agencies, heads of Crown corporations, and other officials are appointed by the Crown-in-Council; though, some of these may be made only by the Governor General-in-Council, specifically. Royal commissions and public inquiries are also called through a royal warrant issued by the King or Governor-in-Council.

All Cabinet meetings are held behind closed doors and the minutes are kept confidential for 30 years, with Cabinet members being forbidden from discussing what transpires. Decisions made must be unanimous; though, this often occurs at the prime minister's direction and, once a decision has been reached, all Cabinet members must publicly support it. If any of these rules are violated, the offending minister is usually removed by the prime minister and, if the disagreement within the Cabinet is strong, a minister may resign, as did John Turner in 1975, over the subject of wage and price controls, and Michael Chong in 2006, over a parliamentary motion recognizing "the Québécois" as a nation within Canada.

However, the Cabinet's collective influence has been seen to be eclipsed by that of the prime minister alone. Former Prime Minister Pierre Trudeau is credited with consolidating power in the Office of the Prime Minister (PMO) and, at the end of the 20th century and into the 21st, analysts, such as Jeffrey Simpson, Donald Savoie, and John Gomery, argued that both Parliament and the Cabinet had become overshadowed by prime ministerial power. Savoie quoted an anonymous minister from the Liberal Party as saying Cabinet had become "a kind of focus group for the prime minister", while Simpson called cabinet a "mini-sounding board". (Note: Savoie offered the critique: "Cabinet has now joined Parliament as an institution being bypassed. Real political debate and decision-making are increasingly elsewhere—in federal-provincial meetings of first ministers, on Team Canada flights, where first ministers can hold informal meetings, in the prime minister's office, in the Privy Council Office, in the Department of Finance, and in international organizations and international summits. There is no indication that the one person who holds all the cards, the prime minister, and the central agencies which enable him to bring effective political authority to the centre, are about to change things.") Coyne wrote in 2015: "Cabinet does not matter [...] It does not govern: that is the job of the prime minister and of the group of political staff he has around him, and of the bureaucracy beyond them." John Robson criticised the use of the prime minister's name to identify the Cabinet, calling it a "bad habit" that "endorses while concealing the swollen pretension of the executive branch".

== Shadow cabinets ==
Each party in His Majesty's Loyal Opposition creates a shadow cabinet, with each member thereof observing and critiquing one or more corresponding, actual Cabinet portfolios and offering alternative policies. The Official Opposition's shadow cabinet comprises members of the party holding the second-largest number of seats and is appointed by the leader of the Opposition; it is generally regarded as a "government in waiting". Its members are often, but not always, appointed to a Cabinet post, should the leader of their party be called to form a government.

== Current Cabinet ==
Portrait	Minister	Portfolio	Tenure
	Mark Carney	Prime Minister	March 14, 2025 – present
	Dominic LeBlanc	Minister of International Trade and Intergovernmental Affairs	March 14, 2025 – May 13, 2025
	Dominic LeBlanc	President of the King's Privy Council for Canada	March 14, 2025 – present
	Dominic LeBlanc	Minister responsible for Canada-U.S. Trade, Intergovernmental Affairs and One Canadian Economy	May 13, 2025 – present
	Dominic LeBlanc	Minister of Internal Trade	September 16, 2025 – present
	Mélanie Joly	Minister of Foreign Affairs and International Development	March 14, 2025 – May 13, 2025
	Mélanie Joly	Minister of Industry	May 13, 2025 – present
	Mélanie Joly	Minister responsible for Canada Economic Development for Quebec Regions	May 13, 2025 – present
	François-Philippe Champagne	Minister of Finance	March 14, 2025 – May 13, 2025
	François-Philippe Champagne	Minister of Finance and National Revenue	May 13, 2025 – present
	Anita Anand	Minister of Innovation, Science and Industry	March 14, 2025 – May 13, 2025
	Anita Anand	Minister of Foreign Affairs	May 13, 2025 – present
	Patty Hajdu	Minister of Indigenous Services	March 14, 2025 – May 13, 2025
	Patty Hajdu	Minister of Jobs and Families	May 13, 2025 – present
	Patty Hajdu	Minister responsible for the Federal Economic Development Agency for Northern Ontario	May 13, 2025 – present
	Gary Anandasangaree	Minister of Crown–Indigenous Relations and Northern Affairs	March 14, 2025 – May 13, 2025
	Gary Anandasangaree	Minister of Justice and Attorney General	March 14, 2025 – May 13, 2025
	Gary Anandasangaree	Minister of Public Safety	May 13, 2025 – present
	Rechie Valdez	Chief Government Whip	March 14, 2025 – May 13, 2025
	Rechie Valdez	Minister of Women and Gender Equality	May 13, 2025 – present
	Rechie Valdez	Secretary of State (Small Business and Tourism)	May 13, 2025 – present
	Steven MacKinnon	Minister of Jobs and Families	March 14, 2025 – May 13, 2025
	Steven MacKinnon	Leader of the Government in the House of Commons	May 13, 2025 – present
	Steven MacKinnon	Minister of Transport	September 16, 2025 – present
	David McGuinty	Minister of Public Safety and Emergency Preparedness	March 14, 2025 – May 13, 2025
	David McGuinty	Minister of National Defence	May 13, 2025 – present
	Joanne Thompson	Minister of Fisheries, Oceans and the Canadian Coast Guard	March 14, 2025 – May 13, 2025
	Joanne Thompson	Minister of Fisheries	May 13, 2025 – present
	Sean Fraser	Minister of Justice and Attorney General	May 13, 2025 – present
	Sean Fraser	Minister responsible for the Atlantic Canada Opportunities Agency	May 13, 2025 – present
	Shafqat Ali	President of the Treasury Board	May 13, 2025 – present
	Rebecca Alty	Minister of Crown–Indigenous Relations	May 13, 2025 – present
	Rebecca Chartrand	Minister of Northern and Arctic Affairs	May 13, 2025 – present
	Rebecca Chartrand	Minister responsible for the Canadian Northern Economic Development Agency	May 13, 2025 – present
	Julie Dabrusin	Minister of Environment and Climate Change	May 13, 2025 – December 1, 2025
	Julie Dabrusin	Minister of the Environment, Climate Change and Nature	December 1, 2025 – present
	Mandy Gull-Masty	Minister of Indigenous Services	May 13, 2025 – present
	Tim Hodgson	Minister of Energy and Natural Resources	May 13, 2025 – present
	Joël Lightbound	Minister of Government Transformation, Public Services and Procurement	May 13, 2025 – present
	Heath MacDonald	Minister of Agriculture and Agri-Food	May 13, 2025 – present
	Jill McKnight	Minister of Veterans Affairs; Associate Minister of National Defence	May 13, 2025 – present
	Lena Diab	Minister of Immigration, Refugees and Citizenship	May 13, 2025 – present
	Marjorie Michel	Minister of Health	May 13, 2025 – present
	Eleanor Olszewski	Minister of Emergency Management and Community Resilience	May 13, 2025 – present
	Eleanor Olszewski	Minister responsible for Prairies Economic Development Canada	May 13, 2025 – present
	Gregor Robertson	Minister of Housing and Infrastructure	May 13, 2025 – present
	Gregor Robertson	Minister responsible for the Pacific Economic Development Agency of Canada	May 13, 2025 – present
	Maninder Sidhu	Minister of International Trade	May 13, 2025 – present
	Evan Solomon	Minister of Artificial Intelligence and Digital Innovation	May 13, 2025 – present
	Evan Solomon	Minister responsible for the Federal Economic Development Agency for Southern Ontario	May 13, 2025 – present
	Marc Miller	Minister of Canadian Identity and Culture	December 1, 2025 – present
	Marc Miller	Minister responsible for Official Languages	December 1, 2025 – present

== Former portfolios ==
- Minister of Border Security and Organized Crime Reduction (2018–2019)
- Secretary of State for the Provinces (1867–1873)
- Minister of Public Works (1867–1996)
- Postmaster General (1867–1981)
- Minister of Customs (1867–1918)
- Minister of Inland Revenue (1867–1918)
- Secretary of State for Canada (1867–1996)
- Minister of Marine and Fisheries (1867–1930)
- Superintendent-General Indian Affairs (1868–1936)
- Minister of the Interior (1873–1936)
- Solicitor General (1892–2003)
- Minister of Mines (1907–1936)
- Secretary of State for External Affairs (1909–1993)
- Minister of Immigration and Colonization (1917–1936)
- Minister of Soldiers' Civil Re-establishment (1918–1928)
- Minister of Customs and Inland Revenue (1918–1921)
- Minister of Customs and Excise (1921–1927)
- Minister of Pensions and National Health (1928–1944)
- Minister of Fisheries (1930–1971)
- Minister of Mines and Resources (1936–1950)
- Minister of Mines and Technical Surveys (1950–1966)
- Minister of Resources and Development (1950–1953)
- Minister of Citizenship and Immigration (1950–1966)
- Minister of Northern Affairs and National Resources (1953–1966)
- Minister of Manpower and Immigration (1966–1977)
- Minister of Energy, Mines and Resources (1966–1995)
- Minister of Consumer and Corporate Affairs (1968–1995)
- Leader of the Government in the Senate (list) (1969–2013)
- Minister of Regional Economic Expansion (1969–1982)
- Minister of Economic Communications (1969–1996)
- Minister of Supply and Services (1969–1996)
- Minister of Industry, Trade and Commerce (1969–1983)
- Minister of Employment and Immigration (1977–1996)
- Minister of Regional Industrial Expansion (1984–1990)
- Minister of Forestry (1990–1995)
- Minister of National Health and Welfare (1944–1996)
- Minister of Industry, Science and Technology (1990–1995)
- Minister responsible for Constitutional Affairs (1991–1993)
- Minister of Multiculturalism and Citizenship (1991–1996)
- Minister of Human Resources Development (1996–2003)
- Minister of Defence Production (1951–1969)
- Minister of Citizens' Services (2023–2025)
- Minister of Diversity, Inclusion and Persons with Disabilities (2019–2025)
- Minister of Mental Health and Addictions (2021–2025)
- Minister of Official Languages (2003–2025)
- Minister of Seniors (2018–2025)
- Minister of Small Business (2015–2025)
- Minister of Sport (1961–1976, 2015–2025)
- Minister of Tourism (1980–1993, 2003–2025)
- Associate Minister of Health (2021–2025)
- Associate Minister of National Defence (1940–1967, 1985–1993, 2003–2025)
- Associate Minister of Public Safety (2024–2025)
- Minister responsible for the Economic Development Agency of Canada for the Regions of Quebec (1993–2025)

== See also ==
- List of Canadian ministries
- Structure of the Canadian federal government
