= Chapleau (federal electoral district) =

Former federal electoral district in Quebec, Canada

Quebec electoral district

Defunct federal electoral district
- Legislature: House of Commons
- District created: 1933
- District abolished: 1967
- First contested: 1935
- Last contested: 1965

Chapleau (French pronunciation: [ʃaplo]) was a federal electoral district in Quebec, Canada, that was represented in the House of Commons of Canada from 1935 to 1968. It is currently a Quebec provincial riding that includes the majority of the Gatineau region.

This riding was created in 1933 from parts of Berthier—Maskinongé, Champlain, Joliette, L'Assomption—Montcalm, Pontiac, and Three Rivers and St. Maurice ridings.

It was abolished in 1967 when it was redistributed into Abitibi, Berthier, Champlain, Portneuf and Villeneuve ridings.

A different Chapleau riding existed from 1987 to 1988 in a different part of Quebec. It was renamed in 1988 to Gatineau—La Lièvre.

== History ==
It consisted of:

- the towns of Buckingham, Gatineau, Masson and Thurso;
- in the County of Labelle: the Municipality of Notre-Dame-du-Laus;
- in the County of Papineau: the township municipalities of Lochaber and Lochaber-Partie-Ouest; the united townships municipality of Mulgrave-et-Derry; the municipalities of Ange-Gardien, Bowman, Mayo, Notre-Dame-de-la-Salette, Saint-Sixte, Val-des-Bois et Val-des-Monts.

== Members of Parliament ==
This riding elected the following members of Parliament:

Parliament	Years	Member	Party
Chapleau; Riding created from Berthier—Maskinongé, Champlain, Joliette, L'Assomption—Montcalm, Pontiac and Three Rivers and St. Maurice
18th	1935–1940	François Blais	Independent Liberal
19th	1940–1945	Hector Authier	Liberal
20th	1945–1949	David Gourd	Liberal
21st	1949–1953	David Gourd	Liberal
22nd	1953–1957	David Gourd	Liberal
23rd	1957–1958	Charles-Noël Barbès	Liberal
24th	1958–1962	Jean-Jacques Martel	Progressive Conservative
25th	1962–1963	Gérard Laprise	Social Credit
26th	1963–1963	Gérard Laprise	Social Credit
26th	1963–1965	Gérard Laprise	Ralliement créditiste
27th	1965–1968	Gérard Laprise	Ralliement créditiste
Riding dissolved into Abitibi, Berthier, Champlain, Portneuf and Villeneuve

== Election results ==
1935 Canadian federal election
Party	Candidate	Votes
Independent Liberal	François Blais	3,093
Liberal	Toussain-Ariste Lalonde	3,082
Conservative	J.-Alphonse Turgeon	2,462
Reconstruction	Joseph-Philippe Cote	372

1940 Canadian federal election
Party	Candidate	Votes
Liberal	Hector Authier	9,402
National Government	J.-Alphonse Turgeon	3,073

1945 Canadian federal election
Party	Candidate	Votes
Liberal	David Gourd	6,230
Social Credit	Joseph-Louis Brunet	3,878
Independent Conservative	Frank Blais	2,653
Bloc populaire	Lucien-Alfred Ladouceur	1,680

1949 Canadian federal election
Party	Candidate	Votes
Liberal	David Gourd	11,304
Union des électeurs	Jean-Robert Ouellet	6,318
Progressive Conservative	J.-Edmond Lepage	1,822

1953 Canadian federal election
Party	Candidate	Votes
Liberal	David Gourd	10,495
Progressive Conservative	Hilaire Leblanc	6,280
Independent	Raoul Duchesne	4,305

1957 Canadian federal election
Party	Candidate	Votes
Liberal	Charles-Noël Barbès	11,428
Progressive Conservative	Jean-Jacques Martel	11,065

1958 Canadian federal election
Party	Candidate	Votes
Progressive Conservative	Jean-Jacques Martel	14,705
Liberal	Charles-Noël Barbès	9,764
Ouvrier canadien	Jean-Jacques Rouleau	243

1962 Canadian federal election
Party	Candidate	Votes
Social Credit	Gérard Laprise	15,430
Liberal	Lilianne Mercier	5,545
Progressive Conservative	Jean-Jacques Martel	5,213
New Democratic	Jean-Paul Element	551

1963 Canadian federal election
Party	Candidate	Votes
Social Credit	Gérard Laprise	14,701
Liberal	Théo. Beaudry	5,955
Progressive Conservative	Gérard Falardeau	4,205

1965 Canadian federal election
Party	Candidate	Votes
Ralliement créditiste	Gérard Laprise	15,402
Liberal	Gaston Labreche	6,816
Progressive Conservative	Claude Bigue	2,320
New Democratic	Arthur Bouchard	872
Independent	A.-Léo Larocque	338

== See also ==
- List of Canadian electoral districts
- Historical federal electoral districts of Canada
