= National Security Council (Canada) =

Canadian government cabinet committee

Committee overview
- Formed: 27 July 2023
- Committee executives: Mark Carney, Prime Minister (Chair); Anita Anand, Minister of Foreign Affairs (Vice-Chair)
- Parent department: Cabinet of Canada
- Website: www.pm.gc.ca/en/cabinet-committee-mandate-and-membership

The National Security Council is a committee within the Cabinet of Canada with the purpose of serving "as a forum for the assessment and advancement of Canada’s strategic national interest in a rapidly evolving world, including through the rigorous analysis of intelligence".

First announced by former Prime Minister Justin Trudeau in July 2023, its initial membership was announced on 27 September 2023. Prime Minister Mark Carney, after the 2025 Canadian federal election and subsequent cabinet reshuffle of the 30th Canadian ministry on 13 May 2025, expanded its membership from eight members to a total of thirteen members.

== Membership ==
The committee is made up of the following thirteen members as of 13 May 2025:

Member	Ministries or Office(s)
Mark Carney (Chair)	Prime Minister of Canada
Anita Anand (Vice-Chair)	Minister of Foreign Affairs
Dominic LeBlanc	President of the King's Privy Council for Canada; Minister responsible for Canada-U.S. Trade, Intergovernmental Affairs and One Canadian Economy
François-Philippe Champagne	Minister of Finance and National Revenue
Mélanie Joly	Minister of Industry; Minister responsible for Canada Economic Development for Quebec Regions
David McGuinty	Minister of National Defence
Sean Fraser	Minister of Justice and Attorney General of Canada; Minister responsible for the Atlantic Canada Opportunities Agency
Tim Hodgson	Minister of Energy and Natural Resources
Gary Anandasangaree	Minister of Public Safety
Steven MacKinnon	Leader of the Government in the House of Commons
Lena Metlege Diab	Minister of Immigration, Refugees and Citizenship
Chrystia Freeland	Minister of Transport and Internal Trade
Eleanor Olszewski	Minister of Emergency Management and Community Resilience; Minister responsible for Prairies Economic Development Canada
