= François Blais =

François Blais may refer to:

- François Blais (Member of Parliament) (1875–1949), member of the Canadian House of Commons in the 1930s
- François Blais (MNA), provincial legislator in Quebec in the 2010s
