= Charles-Noël Barbès =

Canadian politician and lawyer

Member of the Canadian Parliament for Chapleau
- In office 1957–1958
- Preceded by: David Gourd
- Succeeded by: Jean-Jacques Martel

Personal details
- Born: December 25, 1914 Hull, Quebec, Canada
- Died: June 8, 2008 (aged 93)
- Party: Liberal
- Occupation: lawyer

Charles-Noël Barbès (December 25, 1914 – June 8, 2008) was a Canadian politician and lawyer. He was elected to the House of Commons of Canada as a Member of the Liberal Party in 1957 for the riding of Chapleau. He lost in the election of 1958. He was born in Hull, Quebec, Canada.
