= Armand Caouette =

Canadian politician

Member of the Canadian Parliament for Villeneuve
- In office 1974–1979
- Preceded by: Oza Tétrault
- Succeeded by: riding dissolved

Member of the Canadian Parliament for Abitibi
- In office 1979–1980
- Preceded by: Gérard Laprise
- Succeeded by: René Gingras

Personal details
- Born: 20 July 1945 Rouyn, Quebec, Canada
- Died: 15 May 2010 (aged 64) Amos, Quebec, Canada
- Party: Social Credit

Armand Caouette (20 July 1945 – 15 May 2010) was a Social Credit Party member of the House of Commons of Canada. His career included the fields of sales and air-conditioning.

He was first elected to Parliament in the 1974 federal election at the Villeneuve electoral district. Following riding boundary adjustments in 1976, he was re-elected at Abitibi riding in the 1979 election. In the 1980 election, Caouette was defeated by René Gingras of the Liberal party.

Caouette made further attempts to return to Parliament, first as a Progressive Conservative Party candidate in the 1997 election at Abitibi riding, then as a Liberal Party candidate in the 2006 election.
