= Priorities and Planning Committee =

The Priorities and Planning Committee is a key organ of the Cabinet of Canada. Usually chaired by the Prime Minister of Canada, this committee sets and guides the agenda of the government and, in some cases, acts for the whole cabinet under Prime Minister Stephen Harper.

Most provinces and territories of Canada have a similar body within their cabinets.

In November 2015, the Priorities and Planning Committee ceased to exist with the announcement of the Cabinet committee structure under Justin Trudeau.

In March 2025, it returned as the Priorities, Planning and Strategy committee, under Prime Minister Mark Carney.

== Membership ==
As of June 30, 2025, Mark Carney served as chair and Steven MacKinnon is vice-chair of the committee.

As of March 31, 2014, the members of the committee were Stephen Harper (chair), Joe Oliver (vice-chair), Bernard Valcourt, Rob Nicholson, Peter MacKay, Rona Ambrose, Diane Finley, John Baird, Tony Clement, Jason Kenney, Gerry Ritz, Christian Paradis, James Moore, Denis Lebel, Ed Fast, and Shelly Glover.

As of June 4, 2013, the members of the committee were Stephen Harper (chair), Senator Marjory LeBreton (vice-chair), Peter MacKay, Vic Toews, Diane Finley, John Baird, Tony Clement, Jim Flaherty, Jason Kenney, Christian Paradis, James Moore, Denis Lebel, and Ed Fast.

As of October 30, 2008, the members of the committee were Stephen Harper (chair), Lawrence Cannon (vice-chair), Marjory LeBreton, Chuck Strahl, Peter MacKay, Stockwell Day, Vic Toews, Jim Prentice, John Baird, Tony Clement, Jim Flaherty, Josée Verner, and Christian Paradis.
