= René Gingras =

Canadian politician

Member of the Canadian Parliament for Abitibi
- In office 1980–1984
- Preceded by: Armand Caouette
- Succeeded by: Guy St-Julien

Personal details
- Born: 16 September 1938 Amos, Quebec
- Died: 8 January 2016 (aged 77)
- Party: Liberal

René Gingras (September 16, 1938 - January 8, 2016) was a Liberal party member of the House of Commons of Canada. He was an electrician, businessman and administrator by career.

He was elected in the Quebec riding of Abitibi in the 1980 federal election. After serving his only term, the 32nd Canadian Parliament, he was defeated in the 1984 federal election by Guy St-Julien of the Progressive Conservative party
