= Bernard Deshaies =

Canadian politician

Member of Parliament for Abitibi
- In office 1993–1997
- Preceded by: Guy St-Julien
- Succeeded by: Guy St-Julien

Personal details
- Born: 11 December 1953 (age 72) Amos, Quebec
- Party: Bloc Québécois
- Profession: architect

Bernard Deshaies (born 11 December 1953, in Amos, Quebec) is a Canadian businessperson and former member of the House of Commons of Canada, serving from 1993 to 1997.

He was elected in the Abitibi electoral district as a member of the Bloc Québécois party in the 1993 federal election, serving in the 35th Canadian Parliament. He did not seek a second term and left Canadian politics following the 1997 federal election.

Before entering politics, Bernard Deshaies, who holds a master's in business administration, held various positions in his father's company, Ben Deshaies Inc., from 1973 to 1992. In 1998, he opened Benard Deshaies Inc. supermarket and ran it until 2004. He now runs business mentorship programs to help young entrepreneurs prosper.
