= Armand Dumas =

Canadian politician

Member of Parliament for Villeneuve
- In office June 1949 – June 1962
- Preceded by: (riding created)
- Succeeded by: Réal Caouette

Personal details
- Born: 5 August 1905 Notre-Dame-des-Bois, Quebec, Canada
- Died: 13 November 1963 (aged 58)
- Party: Liberal
- Profession: forest engineer, land surveyor

Armand Dumas (5 August 1905 – 13 November 1963) was a Liberal party member of the House of Commons of Canada. Born in Notre-Dame-des-Bois, Quebec, he was a forest engineer and land surveyor by career.

He was first elected at the Villeneuve riding in the 1949 general election then re-elected for successive terms from the 21st to the 24th Canadian Parliaments. Dumas retired from politics as of the 1962 election following medical advice to reduce three-quarters of his workload.
