= Romeo Saganash =

Canadian politician (born 1961)

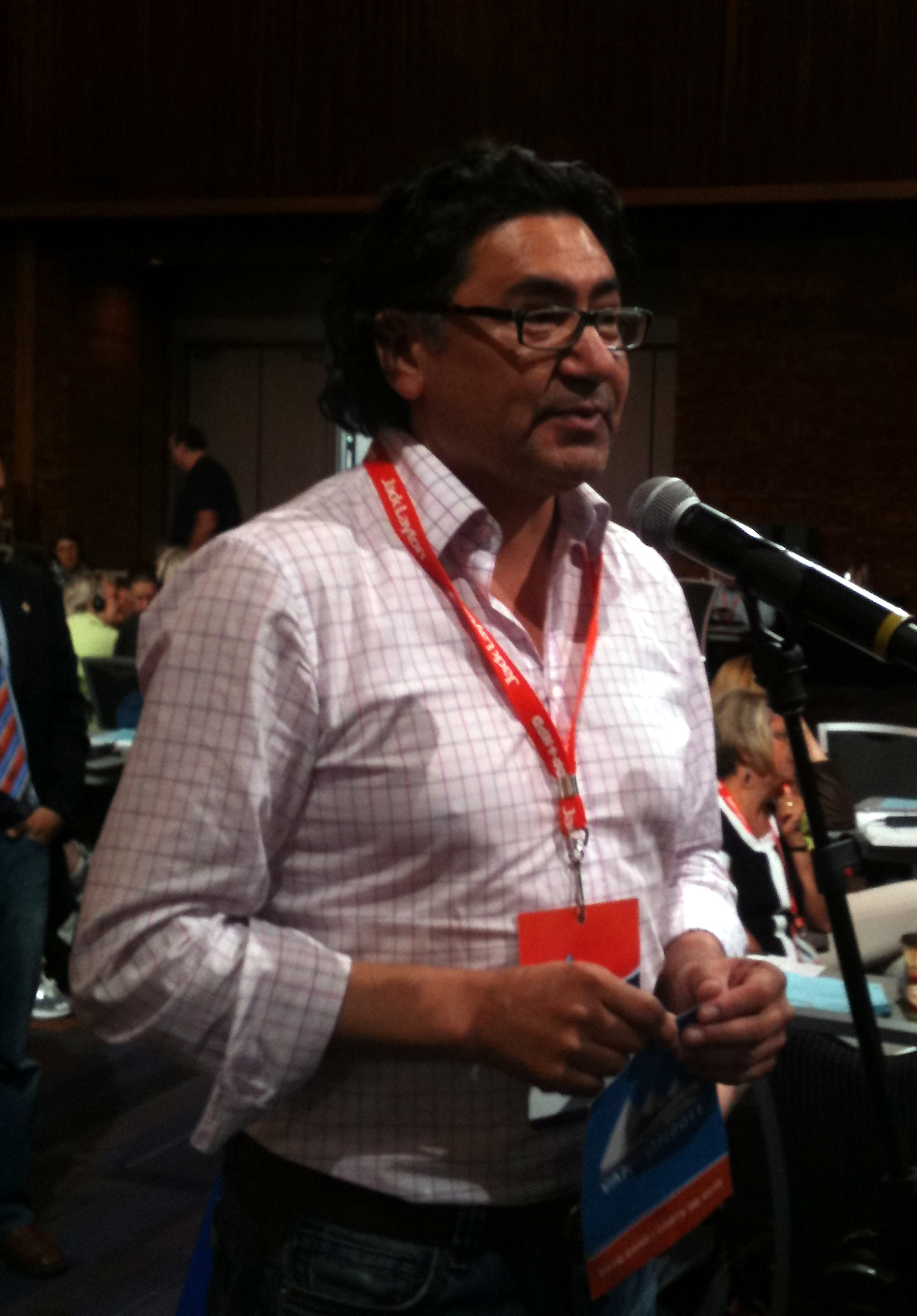
- Saganash in 2011

Shadow Minister for International Cooperation
- In office April 19, 2012 – October 21, 2012
- Leader: Tom Mulcair
- Preceded by: Jinny Sims
- Succeeded by: Hélène Laverdière

Shadow Minister for Natural Resources
- In office May 26, 2011 – September 30, 2011
- Leader: Jack Layton; Nycole Turmel
- Preceded by: Denis Coderre
- Succeeded by: Claude Gravelle

Member of Parliament for Abitibi—Baie-James—Nunavik—Eeyou
- In office May 2, 2011 – September 11, 2019
- Preceded by: Yvon Lévesque
- Succeeded by: Sylvie Bérubé

Deputy Grand Chief of the Grand Council of the Crees
- In office 1990–1993
- Grand Chief: Ted Moses

Personal details
- Born: Diom Romeo Saganash; October 28, 1961 (age 64) Waswanipi, Quebec, Canada
- Party: New Democratic
- Children: Stéphanie Labrecque Saganash; Felix Labrecque-Saganash; Maïtée Labrecque-Saganash
- Education: Université du Québec à Montréal
- Profession: Lawyer

Diom Roméo Saganash (born October 28, 1961) is a Cree lawyer and former politician from Canada. Saganash served as the member of Parliament (MP) for Abitibi—Baie-James—Nunavik—Eeyou in Quebec from 2011 to 2019. A member of the New Democratic Party (NDP), he was first elected to the House of Commons in the 2011 federal election and was re-elected in the 2015 federal election. He did not run in 2019.

== Early life and education ==
Saganash was born on October 28, 1961, in Waswanipi, a Cree community in Quebec. At the age of seven, he was among 27 Cree children taken from their homes to attend a French-language residential school in La Tuque, where he lived with an English-speaking Anglican family. The program was cancelled the following year, but he remained there for ten years, completing his schooling in French. After that, he attended a meeting on the negotiations between the Cree and government officials on constitutional and resource rights, which sparked his interest in pursuing a law degree. He attended law school at the Université du Québec à Montréal and in 1989 he became the first Cree to receive a law degree in Quebec. Saganash is fluent in Cree, French and English.

== Political career ==
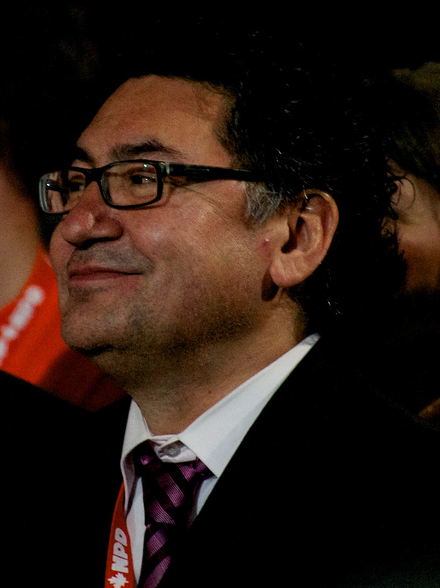
Saganash at the 2012 NDP leadership convention in Toronto.

In 1985, Saganash founded the Cree Nation Youth Council. He was the Deputy Grand Chief to The Grand Council of the Crees of James Bay from 1990 to 1993, and he later served as director of Quebec relations and international affairs for over ten years. From 1997 to 2000, Saganash chaired the James Bay Advisory Committee on the Environment.

As a prominent Cree figure in a riding with many Indigenous peoples, Saganash received personal support from NDP Quebec lieutenant Tom Mulcair, who referred to Saganash as a "very important candidate". He was elected in the 2011 federal election to represent Abitibi—Baie-James—Nunavik—Eeyou. He was one of 59 NDP MPs elected for Quebec ridings (all newcomers to Parliament except Mulcair), and the party overall achieved its best showing in a federal election to date by becoming Official Opposition to the Conservative government, which rose from minority to majority standing.

On September 16, 2011, Saganash announced that he was running for the leadership of the NDP, to succeed Jack Layton, who had died the previous month. He is believed to be the first Indigenous person to run for the leadership of a major Canadian party. He withdrew on February 9, 2012, however, citing illness in his family and a lack of confidence in his campaign. On March 7, 2012, Saganash announced that he would support Mulcair for NDP leader.

After an incident where he was removed from an Air Canada Jazz flight from Montreal to Val-d'Or for intoxication, Saganash took sick leave in October 2012 for the treatment of alcohol dependency. Saganash cited the death of his "friend and mentor" Jack Layton, as well as the "profound scars" he received while in the residential school system, as the reasons for his dependency. He completed his treatment in November 2012, and returned for the start of the House's first session of 2013.

In the 2015 Canadian federal election, Saganash was re-elected to a second term. The NDP fell from second to third in the seat count nationally, behind the new Liberal majority government and the Conservatives.

In the 2017 NDP leadership election, Saganash supported Niki Ashton.

By July 2018, Saganash had decided not to run in the 43rd Canadian federal election, which took place in 2019.

== Personal life ==
In 2023, Saganash was charged with sexual assault and referred to a restorative justice program.

== Electoral record ==
2015 Canadian federal election: Abitibi—Baie-James—Nunavik—Eeyou
Party	Candidate	Votes	%	±%	Expenditures
New Democratic	Roméo Saganash	12,778	37.02	-7.80	$33,061.53
Liberal	Pierre Dufour	11,094	32.14	+21.67	$29,180.64
Bloc Québécois	Luc Ferland	6,398	18.54	+0.27	$31,842.28
Conservative	Steven Hébert	3,211	9.30	-13.25	$11,040.28
Green	Patrick Benoît	779	2.26	-1.63	$2,173.92
Rhinoceros	Mario Gagnon	258	0.75	–	$3.70
Total valid votes/Expense limit		34,518	100.0		$247,914.66
Total rejected ballots		609	–	–	
Turnout		35,127	55.55	–	
Eligible voters		63,226			
New Democratic hold		Swing		-14.73	
Source: Elections Canada

2011 Canadian federal election: Abitibi—Baie-James—Nunavik—Eeyou
Party	Candidate	Votes	%	±%	Expenditures
New Democratic	Roméo Saganash	13,961	44.79	+36.59	$61,976.57
Conservative	Jean-Maurice Matte	7,089	22.74	-7.63	$75,028.15
Bloc Québécois	Yvon Lévesque	5,615	18.02	-21.63	$61,279.33
Liberal	Léandre Gervais	3,282	10.53	-7.89	$76,159.99
Green	Johnny Kasudluak	1,221	3.92	+0.58	$0.00
Total valid votes/Expense limit		31,168	100.00		
Total rejected ballots		480	1.51		
Turnout		31,684	53.69		
New Democratic Party gain from Bloc Québécois		Swing	+29.11		

== See also ==
- 2012 New Democratic Party leadership election
