= David Gourd =

Canadian politician

Member of the Canadian Parliament for Chapleau
- In office June 1945 – April 1957
- Preceded by: Hector Authier
- Succeeded by: Charles-Noël Barbès

Personal details
- Born: 10 February 1885 Saint-Victor d'Alfred, Ontario
- Died: 29 December 1981 (aged 96) Montreal, Quebec, Canada
- Party: Liberal
- Spouse(s): Yvonne Fortin m 7 Jul 1910
- Relations: Joseph-Omer Gour (brother)
- Children: 7
- Profession: financier, merchant

David Gourd (10 February 1885 – 29 December 1981) was a Liberal party member of the House of Commons of Canada. He was born in Saint-Victor d'Alfred, Ontario, and became a financier and merchant by career.

Early in his career, he moved to Amos, Quebec, as one of the new town's first settlers, establishing a general store there. He later became the town's mayor and head of the local chamber of commerce.

He was first elected to Parliament at the Chapleau riding in the 1945 general election, then re-elected in 1949 and 1953. Gourd left federal politics after the end of his third term, the 22nd Canadian Parliament, and did not seek re-election in 1957.
