= Yvon Lévesque =

Canadian politician

Yvon Lévesque MP

Member of Parliament for Abitibi—Baie-James—Nunavik—Eeyou Nunavik—Eeyou, 2004–2006
- In office 2004–2011
- Preceded by: new riding
- Succeeded by: Romeo Saganash

Personal details
- Born: March 10, 1940 (age 86) Lac-au-Saumon, Quebec, Canada
- Party: Bloc Québécois
- Profession: electrician, labour consultant, superintendent

Yvon Lévesque (born March 10, 1940) is a retired politician in Quebec, Canada. He is the former Bloc Québécois Member of Parliament for the riding of Abitibi—Baie-James—Nunavik—Eeyou.

== Biography ==
Born in Lac-au-Saumon, he was an electrician, foreman, labour relations consultant, labour representative, and superintendent before he was first elected to the House of Commons in 2004. He defeated Guy St-Julien, a former Progressive Conservative turned Liberal MP, by 572 votes.

On May 2, 2011, in the 2011 federal election, Lévesque lost his seat to New Democratic Party candidate Romeo Saganash.
