= Minister of Indigenous Services =

Minister in Canadian Cabinet

- Ministre des Services aux Autochtones
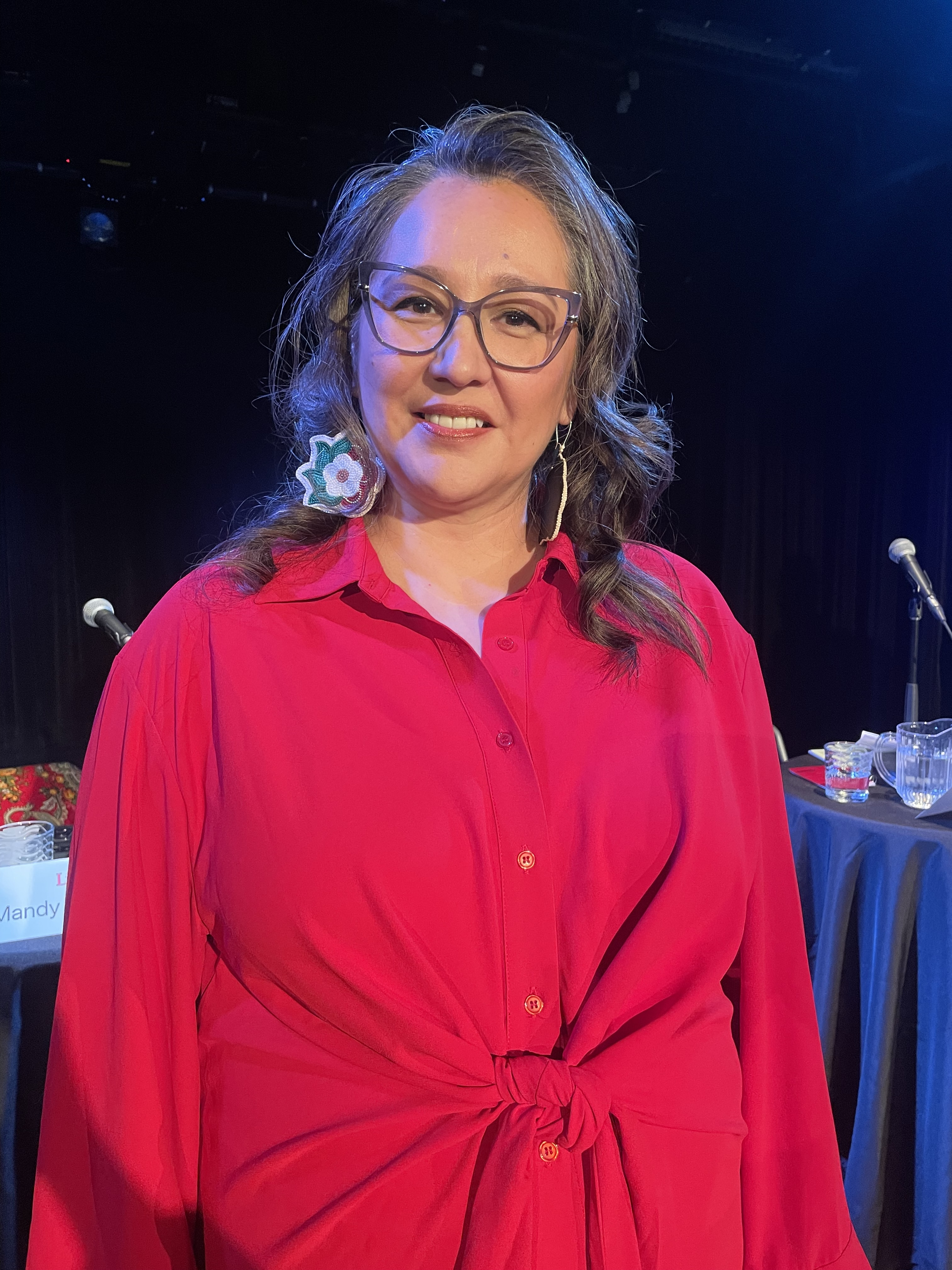
- Incumbent; Mandy Gull-Masty since May 13, 2025
- Indigenous Services Canada
- Style: The Honourable
- Member of: Parliament; Privy Council; Cabinet
- Reports to: Parliament; Prime Minister
- Appointer: Monarch (represented by the governor general); on the advice of the prime minister
- Term length: At His Majesty's pleasure
- Inaugural holder: Jane Philpott
- Formation: August 28, 2017
- Salary: CA$299,900 (2024)
- Website: sac-isc.gc.ca

The minister of Indigenous services (French: ministre des services aux autochtones) is the minister of the Crown responsible for Indigenous Services Canada (ISC), the department of the Government of Canada which delivers federal government services to Indigenous peoples. The minister is a member of the King's Privy Council for Canada and the Canadian Cabinet.

Mandy Gull-Masty has been the minister of Indigenous services since May 13, 2025. The minister is selected by the prime minister and appointed by the Crown. The position was created in 2017 when the Indian Affairs and Northern Development was abolished, with ISC taking over the management of health, clean water and other services. Together with the minister of Crown–Indigenous relations, the minister of Indigenous services administers agreements between the Canadian Crown and Indigenous peoples.

== List of ministers ==
Key:

Liberal Party of Canada

No.	Portrait	Name	Term of office		Political party	Ministry
1		Jane Philpott	August 28, 2017	January 14, 2019	Liberal	29 (J. Trudeau)
2		Seamus O'Regan	January 14, 2019	November 20, 2019	Liberal	29 (J. Trudeau)
3		Marc Miller	November 20, 2019	October 26, 2021	Liberal	29 (J. Trudeau)
4		Patty Hajdu	October 26, 2021	March 14, 2025	Liberal	29 (J. Trudeau)
4		Patty Hajdu	March 14, 2025	May 13, 2025	Liberal	30 (Carney)
5		Mandy Gull-Masty	May 13, 2025	Incumbent	Liberal	30 (Carney)

== Water infrastructure on reserves ==
Since 2016, more than $3.5 billion was allocated for water and wastewater infrastructure, which included funding for "more than 600 water and wastewater projects." Infrastructure has been repaired, expanded, or replaced, training has been strengthened across the country, and additional funding for operations and maintenance is being allocated to communities.

On December 2, 2020 Marc Miller, the minister, announced additional investments of over $1.5 billion to "ensure clean drinking water in First Nations communities."

=== Long-term Drinking Water Advisories ===
The total number of drinking water advisories had decreased by 55% from 2015 to 2020—from a baseline number of 105 in November 2015 to 58 in 35 communities by September 2020. Of these 58 advisories, 3% are being reviewed in a feasibility study, 10% are in design phase, 53% are under construction, and 33% cases the lifting of the advisory is pending. A long-terms drinking water advisory refers to advisories that have been in place for over a year. These advisories occur "when a water system is not functioning well—"because of equipment malfunction and/or operational issues which prevent the system from treating water to the required quality".

DWAs are put in place if a water line breaks, if there is equipment failure, or if there is "poor filtration or disinfection when water is treated." A DWA may be issued if the community does not have "someone trained to run the water system", or "someone trained to test and ensure the quality of the drinking water." There are three types of advisories—boil water, do not consume, and do not use.

Of the 55 communities that were under a DWA as of March 1, 2021, the majority are in the province of Ontario. where there are DWAs issued in Sandy Lake First Nation, Muskrat Dam Lake First Nation, Northwest Angle 33 First Nation, Gull Bay First Nation Kiashke Zaaging Anishinaabek, Shoal Lake 40 First Nation, Nibinamik Neskantaga First Nation, Anishinabe of Wauzhushk Onigum, Mohawks of the Bay of Quinte First Nation, Wabaseemoong, Mishkeegogamang First Nation, Sachigo Lake First Nation, Washagamis Bay, Eabametoong Oneida of the Thames First Nation, Bearskin Lake First Nation, Saugeen First Nation, North Spirit Lake First Nation, Mississaugas of Scugog Island First Nation, Deer Lake First Nation, Chippewas of Nawash First Nation, Anishnaabeg of Naongashiing, Chippewas of Georgina Island First Nation, Wawakapewin First Nation, and Marten Falls First Nation.

According to the First Nations Health Authority, in British Columbia, there are DWAs in 18 First Nations in 18 Water Systems—ten "Boil Water Advisories" and eight "Do Not Consume" advisories, as of January 31, 2021. This list "includes water systems with 5 or more connections (CWS) and smaller water systems that have public facilities (PWS)." Affected communities include the Semiahmoo First Nation, Xeni Gwet'in First Nation, with from 26 to 50 people affected, and Wetʼsuwetʼen First Nation, where some 51 to a 100 are affected.

In Manitoba, the Tataskweyak Cree Nation, Shamattawa First Nation, and Sapotaweyak Wahta are under a DWA.

In Saskatchewan, DWAs have been issued in White Bear First Nation, Little Saskatchewan First Nation, Ministikwan Lake Cree Nation, Peepeekisis Cree Nation, Peter Ballantyne Cree Nation, Little Pine First Nation, and Star Blanket Cree Nation.

== See also ==
- Minister of Crown–Indigenous Relations
