= Guy St-Julien =

Canadian politician

Guy St-Julien (born February 19, 1940) is a Canadian politician. He is a former director of human resources and a senior clerk. St-Julien was born in Val-d'Or, Quebec.

St-Julien was a member of the Liberal Party of Canada in the House of Commons of Canada, representing the riding of Abitibi—Baie-James—Nunavik from 2000 to 2004, and Abitibi as a Liberal from 1997 to 2000 and as a Progressive Conservative from 1984 to 1993.

He lost his seat (now called Nunavik—Eeyou) in the 2004 election to Bloc Québécois candidate Yvon Lévesque.

Parliament of Canada
Preceded by René Gingras, Liberal	Member of Parliament for Abitibi; 1984–1993	Succeeded by Bernard Deshaies, Bloc Québécois
Preceded by Bernard Deshaies, Bloc Québécois	Member of Parliament for Abitibi; 1997–2000	Succeeded by The electoral district changed name to Abitibi—Baie-James—Nunavik in 1998.
Preceded by The electoral district changed name from Abitibi to Abitibi—Baie-James—Nunavik in 1998.	Member of Parliament for Abitibi—Baie-James—Nunavik; 2000–2004	Succeeded by The electoral district was abolished in 2003.
