= Gérard Laprise =

Canadian politician (1925–2000)

- Official 1974 portrait

Member of the Canadian Parliament for Chapleau
- In office June 1962 – June 1968
- Preceded by: Jean-Jacques Martel
- Succeeded by: District was abolished in 1966

Member of the Canadian Parliament for Abitibi
- In office June 1968 – March 1979
- Preceded by: District was created in 1966
- Succeeded by: Armand Caouette

Personal details
- Born: 19 April 1925 La Sarre, Quebec
- Died: 14 November 2000 (aged 75)
- Party: Social Credit Party
- Profession: Carpenter

Gérard Laprise (19 April 1925 – 14 November 2000) was a Social Credit Party and Ralliement créditiste member of the House of Commons of Canada. He was born in La Sarre, Quebec and became a carpenter by career.

He was first elected at the Chapleau riding in the 1962 general election with the Social Credit party, but was under the Ralliement créditiste banner from 1963 to 1971.

== Timeline ==
=== Election campaigns ===
- 1962 federal election: Elected at Chapleau
- 1963 federal election: Elected at Chapleau
- 1965 federal election: Elected at Chapleau
- 1968 federal election: Elected at Abitibi
- 1972 federal election: Elected at Abitibi
- 1974 federal election: Elected at Abitibi

=== Caucus service ===
- 27 September 1962 – 31 August 1963: Social Credit Party, to end of 25th Parliament
- 1 September 1963 – 31 March 1971: Ralliement Créditiste, before end of 28th Parliament
- 1 April 1971 – 26 March 1979: Social Credit Party, to end of 30th Parliament
