= Hector Authier =

Canadian politician

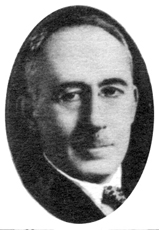

Member of the Canadian Parliament for Chapleau
- In office 1940–1945
- Preceded by: François Blais
- Succeeded by: David Gourd

Member of the Legislative Assembly of Quebec for Abitibi
- In office 1923–1936
- Preceded by: Joseph-Édouard Perrault
- Succeeded by: Émile Lesage

Personal details
- Born: November 4, 1881 Ange-Gardien, Quebec, Canada
- Died: April 14, 1971 (aged 89) Montreal, Quebec, Canada
- Party: Liberal
- Profession: lawyer, news reporter/announcer

Hector Authier (French pronunciation: [ɛktɔʁ otje]; November 4, 1881 – April 14, 1971) was a Canadian politician, lawyer and news reporter/announcer.

== Background ==
He was born on November 4, 1881, in Ange-Gardien, Quebec.

== Mayor ==
He served as the first Mayor of Amos, Quebec, in 1914, for a one-year term.

== Member of the legislature ==
Authier won a by-election in 1923 and became the Liberal Member of the Legislative Assembly (MLA) for the provincial district of Abitibi. He was re-elected in the 1927, 1931 and 1935 elections.

He served as Deputy Speaker of the House from 1935 to 1936 and was a Member of the Cabinet as the Minister of Colonization by 1936. He did not run for re-election in the 1936 election.

== Federal politics ==
He was elected to the House of Commons of Canada in 1940 as a Member of the Liberal Party representing the riding of Chapleau.

== Death ==
He died on April 14, 1971, in Montreal.

The municipalities of Authier and Authier-Nord are named after him.
