= Sylvie Bérubé =

Canadian politician

Member of Parliament for Abitibi—Baie-James—Nunavik—Eeyou
- In office October 21, 2019 – April 28, 2025
- Preceded by: Roméo Saganash
- Succeeded by: Mandy Gull-Masty

Personal details
- Party: Bloc Québécois

Sylvie Bérubé is a Canadian politician who served as the Member of Parliament (MP) for Abitibi—Baie-James—Nunavik—Eeyou from 2019 to 2025. A member of the Bloc Québécois (BQ), her riding encompassed more than half of Quebec, covering over one hundred ninety million acres (770,000 km^{2}) in the northwest of the province.

== Political career ==
Before entering federal politics, Bérubé was president of the local Parti Québécois association in Abitibi-Est for three years. In July 2019, she was selected as the Bloc Québécois candidate for the federal election and won the seat in October, succeeding NDP MP Roméo Saganash. She was re-elected in 2021.

From 2021 to 2025, Bérubé served as the critic of families, children and social development in the Bloc Québécois Shadow Cabinet. In the House of Commons, she served as vice-chair of the Indigenous and Northern Affairs Committee.

In the 2025 election, she was unseated by Liberal candidate Mandy Gull-Masty.

== Electoral history ==
2021 Canadian federal election: Abitibi—Baie-James—Nunavik—Eeyou
Party	Candidate	Votes	%	±%	Expenditures
Bloc Québécois	Sylvie Bérubé	10,784	37.92	+1.81	$18,335.60
Liberal	Lise Kistabish	7,384	25.97	–2.34	$33,563.25
Conservative	Steve Corriveau	4,508	15.85	–0.70	$17,415.31
New Democratic	Pauline Lameboy	3,323	11.69	–1.27	$2,453.20
People's	Michaël Cloutier	1,072	3.77	+2.57	$0.00
Free	Cédric Brazeau	594	2.09	–	$653.98
Green	Didier Pilon	442	1.55	–2.09	$0.00
Marijuana	Jimmy Levesque	329	1.16	–0.06	$0.00
Total valid votes/expense limit		28,436	100.00	–	$130,889.29
Total rejected ballots		856	2.92	+0.37	
Turnout		29,292	44.92	–5.28	
Eligible voters		65,211			
Bloc Québécois hold		Swing		+2.08	
Source: Elections Canada

2019 Canadian federal election: Abitibi—Baie-James—Nunavik—Eeyou
Party	Candidate	Votes	%	±%	Expenditures
Bloc Québécois	Sylvie Bérubé	11,432	36.11	+17.57	$21,739.42
Liberal	Isabelle Bergeron	8,963	28.31	-3.83	$28,187.31
Conservative	Martin Ferron	5,240	16.55	+7.25	none listed
New Democratic	Jacline Rouleau	4,104	12.96	-24.06	$1,679.03
Green	Kiara Cabana-Whiteley	1,151	3.64	+1.38	none listed
Marijuana	Daniel Simon	387	1.22	–	none listed
People's	Guillaume Lanouette	379	1.20	–	none listed
Total valid votes/expense limit		31,656	100.0		
Total rejected ballots		828			
Turnout		32,484	50.2		
Eligible voters		64,651			
Bloc Québécois gain from New Democratic		Swing		+10.70	
Source: Elections Canada
