= François Blais (Member of Parliament) =

Canadian politician

François "Frank" Blais
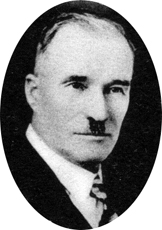

Member of the Canadian Parliament for Chapleau
- In office 1935–1940
- Preceded by: riding was created in 1933 from parts of Berthier—Maskinongé, Champlain, Joliette, L'Assomption—Montcalm, Pontiac, and Three Rivers and St. Maurice
- Succeeded by: Hector Authier

Personal details
- Born: August 22, 1875 Saint-Paul-de-Montminy, Quebec, Canada
- Died: June 2, 1949 (aged 73)
- Party: Independent Liberal
- Occupation: contractor, farmer, lumber merchant

François Frank Blais (born August 22, 1875 – June 2, 1949) was a Canadian politician, contractor, farmer, lumber merchant. He was elected to the House of Commons of Canada in the 1935 election as an Independent Liberal to represent the riding of Chapleau.

Blais was born in Saint-Paul-de-Montminy, Quebec, Canada.
