= Abitibi—Baie-James—Nunavik—Eeyou =

Federal electoral district in Quebec, Canada

Coordinates: 57.80°N 72.90°W

Quebec electoral district
- Interactive map of riding boundaries from the 2015 federal election

Federal electoral district
- Legislature: House of Commons
MP
Mandy Gull-Masty
Liberal
- District created: 1966
- First contested: 1968
- Last contested: 2025
- District webpage: profile, map

Demographics
- Population (2016): 87,787
- Electors (2019): 64,651
- Area (km²): 854,754
- Pop. density (per km²): 0.1
- Census division(s): Jamésie, Kativik Regional Government, La Vallée-de-l'Or RCM
- Census subdivision(s): Val-d'Or, Chibougamau, Chisasibi, Mistissini, Malartic, Senneterre, Kuujjuaq, Eeyou-Istchee-Baie-James, Waskaganish, Puvirnituq

Abitibi—Baie-James—Nunavik—Eeyou (formerly known as Abitibi, Abitibi—Baie-James—Nunavik and Nunavik—Eeyou) is a federal riding in the province of Quebec, Canada, that has been represented in the House of Commons of Canada since 1968. Since the 2025 federal election, its Member of Parliament (MP) has been Mandy Gull-Masty of the Liberal Party of Canada.

The riding of Abitibi was created in 1966 (ahead of the 1968 election), before it was renamed Abitibi—Baie-James—Nunavik in 1998. It was abolished in 2003 (ahead of the 2004 election); most of its territory was incorporated into Nunavik—Eeyou, which was then renamed Abitibi—Baie-James—Nunavik—Eeyou in 2004.

== Geography ==
Abitibi—Baie-James—Nunavik—Eeyou consists of: -the Vallée-de-l'Or Regional County Municipality (population 2016: 43,226), including: Lac-Simon Indian Reserve; the Indian Settlement of Grand-Lac Victoria; the Territory of Eeyou Istchee James Bay and the Territory of the Kativik Regional Government.

The neighbouring ridings are Kapuskasing—Timmins—Mushkegowuk, Nunavut, Labrador, Côte-Nord—Kawawachikamach—Nitassinan, Jonquière—Hébertville—Pays-des-Bleuets, Lac-Saint-Jean, Saint-Maurice—Champlain, Pontiac—Kitigan Zibi and Abitibi—Témiscamingue.

Abitibi—Baie-James—Nunavik—Eeyou contains more than half of Quebec's total landmass. As such, it is the largest riding in a Canadian province and the third largest in the country after the territorial ridings of Nunavut and Northwest Territories.

== Demographics ==
According to the 2021 Canadian census

- Ethnic groups: 57.9% White, 39.6% Indigenous, 1.2% Black
- Languages: 60.4% French, 13.9% Inuktitut, 12.0% Cree, n.o.s., 4.6% English, 3.5% Iyiyiw-Ayimiwin (Northern East Cree)
- Religions: 71.5% Christian (43.7% Catholic, 18.8% Anglican, 3.5% Pentecostal, 5.5% Other), 1.3% Indigenous Spirituality, 26.1% None
- Median income: $43,200 (2020)
- Average income: $53,050 (2020)

== History ==
The Abitibi riding was created in 1966 from parts of the Chapleau and Saguenay ridings. It was first contested in 1968. In 1976, parts of Villeneuve were incorporated. The electoral district's name was changed in 1998 to Abitibi—Baie-James—Nunavik.

In the 2003 redistribution, Abitibi—Baie-James—Nunavik was abolished. A new riding, Nunavik—Eeyou, was created with substatilly the same territory as Abitibi—Baie-James—Nunavik. Parts of the Manicouagan and Roberval ridings were added, while a part was lost to Abitibi—Témiscamingue. Its name was changed to Abitibi—Baie-James—Nunavik—Eeyou after the 2004 election.

The 2012 electoral redistribution saw the riding gain a small territory from Abitibi—Témiscamingue.

== Riding associations ==
Riding associations are the local branches of political parties:

Party	Association name	President	HQ city
Conservative	Association du Parti conservateur d'Abitibi--Baie-James--Nunavik--Eeyou	Steve Corriveau	Val-d'Or
Liberal	Association libérale fédérale d'Abitibi--Baie-James--Nunavik--Eeyou	Loic Sounde	Côte-Saint-Luc
New Democratic	Association NPD Abitibi--Baie-James--Nunavik--Eeyou	Duncan Viktor Salvain	Montreal

== Members of Parliament ==
This riding has elected the following members of Parliament:

Parliament	Years	Member	Party
Abitibi; Riding created from Chapleau, Villeneuve and Saguenay
28th	1968–1971	Gérard Laprise	Ralliement créditiste
28th	1971–1972	Gérard Laprise	Social Credit
29th	1972–1974	Gérard Laprise	Social Credit
30th	1974–1979	Gérard Laprise	Social Credit
31st	1979–1980	Armand Caouette	Social Credit
32nd	1980–1984	René Gingras	Liberal
33rd	1984–1988	Guy St-Julien	Progressive Conservative
34th	1988–1993	Guy St-Julien	Progressive Conservative
35th	1993–1997	Bernard Deshaies	Bloc Québécois
36th	1997–2000	Guy St-Julien	Liberal
Abitibi—Baie-James—Nunavik
37th	2000–2004	Guy St-Julien	Liberal
Nunavik—Eeyou
38th	2004–2006	Yvon Lévesque	Bloc Québécois
Abitibi—Baie-James—Nunavik—Eeyou
39th	2006–2008	Yvon Lévesque	Bloc Québécois
40th	2008–2011	Yvon Lévesque	Bloc Québécois
41st	2011–2015	Roméo Saganash	New Democratic
42nd	2015–2019	Roméo Saganash	New Democratic
43rd	2019–2021	Sylvie Bérubé	Bloc Québécois
44th	2021–2025	Sylvie Bérubé	Bloc Québécois
45th	2025–present	Mandy Gull-Masty	Liberal

== Election results ==
Graph of election results in Abitibi—Baie-James—Nunavik—Eeyou (minor parties that never received 2% of the vote or did not run consistently are omitted)

=== Abitibi—Baie-James—Nunavik—Eeyou, 2004–present ===
2025 Canadian federal election
Party	Candidate	Votes	%	±%	Expenditures
Liberal	Mandy Gull-Masty	12,578	41.16	+15.19	$58,531.59
Bloc Québécois	Sylvie Bérubé	10,381	33.97	−3.95	$30,851.86
Conservative	Steve Corriveau	6,850	22.41	+6.56	$3,787.95
New Democratic	Thai Dillon Higashihara	752	2.46	−9.23	$0.00
Total valid votes/expense limit		30,561	97.61	+0.53	$151,648.60
Total rejected ballots		747	2.39	–0.53	
Turnout		31,308	47.56	+2.64	
Eligible voters		65,833			
Liberal gain from Bloc Québécois		Swing		+9.57	
Source: Elections Canada
Note: number of eligible voters does not include voting day registrations.

2021 Canadian federal election
Party	Candidate	Votes	%	±%	Expenditures
Bloc Québécois	Sylvie Bérubé	10,784	37.92	+1.81	$18,335.60
Liberal	Lise Kistabish	7,384	25.97	–2.34	$33,563.25
Conservative	Steve Corriveau	4,508	15.85	–0.70	$17,415.31
New Democratic	Pauline Lameboy	3,323	11.69	–1.27	$2,453.20
People's	Michaël Cloutier	1,072	3.77	+2.57	$0.00
Free	Cédric Brazeau	594	2.09	–	$653.98
Green	Didier Pilon	442	1.55	–2.09	$0.00
Marijuana	Jimmy Levesque	329	1.16	–0.06	$0.00
Total valid votes/expense limit		28,436	100.00	–	$130,889.29
Total rejected ballots		856	2.92	+0.37	
Turnout		29,292	44.92	–5.28	
Eligible voters		65,211			
Bloc Québécois hold		Swing		+2.08	
Source: Elections Canada

2019 Canadian federal election
Party	Candidate	Votes	%	±%	Expenditures
Bloc Québécois	Sylvie Bérubé	11,432	36.11	+17.57	$21,739.42
Liberal	Isabelle Bergeron	8,963	28.31	-3.83	$28,187.31
Conservative	Martin Ferron	5,240	16.55	+7.25	none listed
New Democratic	Jacline Rouleau	4,104	12.96	-24.06	$1,679.03
Green	Kiara Cabana-Whiteley	1,151	3.64	+1.38	none listed
Marijuana	Daniel Simon	387	1.22	–	none listed
People's	Guillaume Lanouette	379	1.20	–	none listed
Total valid votes/expense limit		31,656	100.0		
Total rejected ballots		828			
Turnout		32,484	50.2		
Eligible voters		64,651			
Bloc Québécois gain from New Democratic		Swing		+10.70	
Source: Elections Canada

2015 Canadian federal election
Party	Candidate	Votes	%	±%	Expenditures
New Democratic	Roméo Saganash	12,778	37.02	-7.80	$33,061.53
Liberal	Pierre Dufour	11,094	32.14	+21.67	$29,180.64
Bloc Québécois	Luc Ferland	6,398	18.54	+0.27	$31,842.28
Conservative	Steven Hébert	3,211	9.30	-13.25	$11,040.28
Green	Patrick Benoît	779	2.26	-1.63	$2,173.92
Rhinoceros	Mario Gagnon	258	0.75	–	$3.70
Total valid votes/Expense limit		34,518	100.0		$247,914.66
Total rejected ballots		609	–	–	
Turnout		35,127	55.55	–	
Eligible voters		63,226			
New Democratic hold		Swing		-14.73	
Source: Elections Canada

2011 federal election redistributed results
Party	Vote	%
New Democratic	14,141	44.82
Conservative	7,116	22.55
Bloc Québécois	5,763	18.27
Liberal	3,302	10.47
Green	1,228	3.89

2011 Canadian federal election
Party	Candidate	Votes	%	±%	Expenditures
New Democratic	Roméo Saganash	13,961	44.79	+36.59	$61,976.57
Conservative	Jean-Maurice Matte	7,089	22.74	-7.63	$75,028.15
Bloc Québécois	Yvon Lévesque	5,615	18.02	-21.63	$61,279.33
Liberal	Léandre Gervais	3,282	10.53	-7.89	$76,159.99
Green	Johnny Kasudluak	1,221	3.92	+0.58	$0.00
Total valid votes/Expense limit		31,168	100.00		
Total rejected ballots		480	1.51		
Turnout		31,684	53.69		
New Democratic Party gain from Bloc Québécois		Swing	+29.11		

Source: Elections Canada Source: The Gazette Popular Cree leader running for NDP Source: Nunatsiaq News Nunavik voters face two ballots in one week

2008 Canadian federal election
Party	Candidate	Votes	%	±%	Expenditures
Bloc Québécois	Yvon Lévesque	10,995	39.65	-6.91	$63,715
Conservative	Jean-Maurice Matte	8,442	30.37	+9.43	$76,072
Liberal	Mark Canada	5,108	18.42	-3.97	$16,924
New Democratic	Erica Martin	2,276	8.20	+2.15	
Green	Patrick Rancourt	928	3.34	-0.69	
Total valid votes/Expense limit		27,749	100.00	$96,336	
Bloc Québécois hold		Swing		-8.17	

2006 Canadian federal election
Party	Candidate	Votes	%	±%	Expenditures
Bloc Québécois	Yvon Lévesque	13,928	46.56	+1.33	$67,066
Liberal	Armand Caouette	6,700	22.40	−20.77	$31,110
Conservative	Gilles Gagnon	6,261	20.93	+16.39	$7,272
New Democratic	Dominique Vaillancourt	1,810	6.05	+2.11	
Green	Pierre Denis	1,210	4.04	+0.95	$0
Total valid votes/Expense limit		29,909	100.00	$89,323	
Bloc Québécois hold		Swing		+11.05	

=== Nunavik—Eeyou, 2003–2004 ===
2004 Canadian federal election
Party	Candidate	Votes	%	±%	Expenditures
Bloc Québécois	Yvon Lévesque	12,578	45.23	+2.5	$72,518
Liberal	Guy St-Julien	12,006	43.17	-6.8	$52,505
Conservative	François Dionne	1,265	4.54	-1.2	$3,420
New Democratic	Pierre Corbeil	1,097	3.94	+2.5	$
Green	Martin Fournier	862	3.09	–	$
Total valid votes/Expense limit		27,808	100.00	$87,366	

Note: Conservative vote is compared to the total of the Canadian Alliance vote and Progressive Conservative vote in 2000 election.

=== Abitibi—Baie-James—Nunavik, 2000–2004 ===
2000 Canadian federal election
Party	Candidate	Votes	%	±%
Liberal	Guy St-Julien	18,198	50.0	+6.2
Bloc Québécois	François Lemieux	15,567	42.8	+5.9
Alliance	François Dionne	1,297	3.6	
Progressive Conservative	Sylvain Gemme	809	2.2	-14.8
New Democratic	Daniel Fredrick	534	1.5	-0.9
Total valid votes		36,405	100.0	

=== Abitibi, 1968–2000 ===
1997 Canadian federal election
Party	Candidate	Votes	%	±%
Liberal	Guy St-Julien	16,803	43.7	+27.5
Bloc Québécois	Jeannot Couture	14,168	36.9	-9.0
Progressive Conservative	Armand Caouette	6,531	17.0	-18.6
New Democratic	Claudette Paquin	909	2.4	+0.1
Total valid votes		38,411	100.0	

1993 Canadian federal election
Party	Candidate	Votes	%	±%
Bloc Québécois	Bernard Deshaies	18,876	45.9	
Progressive Conservative	Guy St-Julien	14,651	35.6	-21.9
Liberal	Lucie Blais	6,666	16.2	0.0
New Democratic	Louise Cloutier	951	2.3	-24.0
Total valid votes		41,144	100.0	

1988 Canadian federal election
Party	Candidate	Votes	%	±%
Progressive Conservative	Guy St-Julien	22,254	57.6	+5.6
New Democratic	Gerry Lemoyne	10,161	26.3	-1.7
Liberal	Normand Michaud	6,251	16.2	+8.2
Total valid votes		38,666	100.0	

1984 Canadian federal election
Party	Candidate	Votes	%	±%
Progressive Conservative	Guy St-Julien	23,230	52.0	+47.4
Liberal	René Gingras	12,525	28.0	-23.0
New Democratic	Royal Tremblay	3,583	8.0	+2.1
Rhinoceros	Robert Hamelin	2,264	5.1	
Parti nationaliste	Georges Caron	1,925	4.3	
Social Credit	Alphonse Leduc	1,179	2.6	-31.8
Total valid votes		44,706	100.0	

1980 Canadian federal election
Party	Candidate	Votes	%	±%
Liberal	René Gingras	22,050	51.1	+17.8
Social Credit	Armand Caouette	14,881	34.5	-10.9
New Democratic	Royal Tremblay	2,553	5.9	+2.9
Progressive Conservative	Marius Gauthier	1,982	4.6	-7.4
Independent	Myriam Bouchard	1,00	2.3	
Union populaire	Martine Dion	416	1.0	+0.2
Marxist–Leninist	Fernand Deschamps	300	0.7	+0.2
Total valid votes		43,190	100.0	

1979 Canadian federal election
Party	Candidate	Votes	%	±%
Social Credit	Armand Caouette	21,387	45.4	-11.2
Liberal	Ronald Tétrault	15,697	33.3	+1.2
Progressive Conservative	Jean-Jacques Martel	5,652	12.0	+6.5
Rhinoceros	Doris St-Pierre	1,425	3.0	
New Democratic	Maurice Vaney	1,420	3.0	-1.7
Independent	Zebedee Nungak	986	2.1	
Union populaire	Judith Desjardins	344	0.7	
Marxist–Leninist	Jean Létourneau	233	0.5	
Total valid votes		47,144	100.0	

1974 Canadian federal election
Party	Candidate	Votes	%	±%
Social Credit	Gérard Laprise	12,423	56.5	0.9
Liberal	Marcel Gagnon	7,046	32.1	-4.5
Progressive Conservative	Robert Johnson	1,199	5.5	-2.3
New Democratic	Léon Guenette	1,031	4.7	
Independent	Yves Limoges	282	1.3	
Total valid votes		21,981	100.0	

1972 Canadian federal election
Party	Candidate	Votes	%	±%
Social Credit	Gérard Laprise	12,482	55.7	+0.7
Liberal	Marcel Bergeron	8,203	36.6	+3.2
Progressive Conservative	Paul-Emile Gelinas	1,739	7.8	-1.3
Total valid votes		22,424	100.0	

Note: Social Credit vote is compared to Ralliement créditiste vote in the 1968 election.

1968 Canadian federal election
Party	Candidate	Votes	%
Ralliement créditiste	Gérard Laprise	10,884	55.0
Liberal	André Lavigne	6,606	33.4
Progressive Conservative	Marc Parent	1,796	9.1
New Democratic	J.-Gérald Leonard	515	2.6
Total valid votes		19,801	100.0

== See also ==
- List of Canadian electoral districts
- Historical federal electoral districts of Canada
