= Mandy Gull-Masty =

Canadian politician (born 1980)

The Honourable Mandy Gull-Masty PC MP
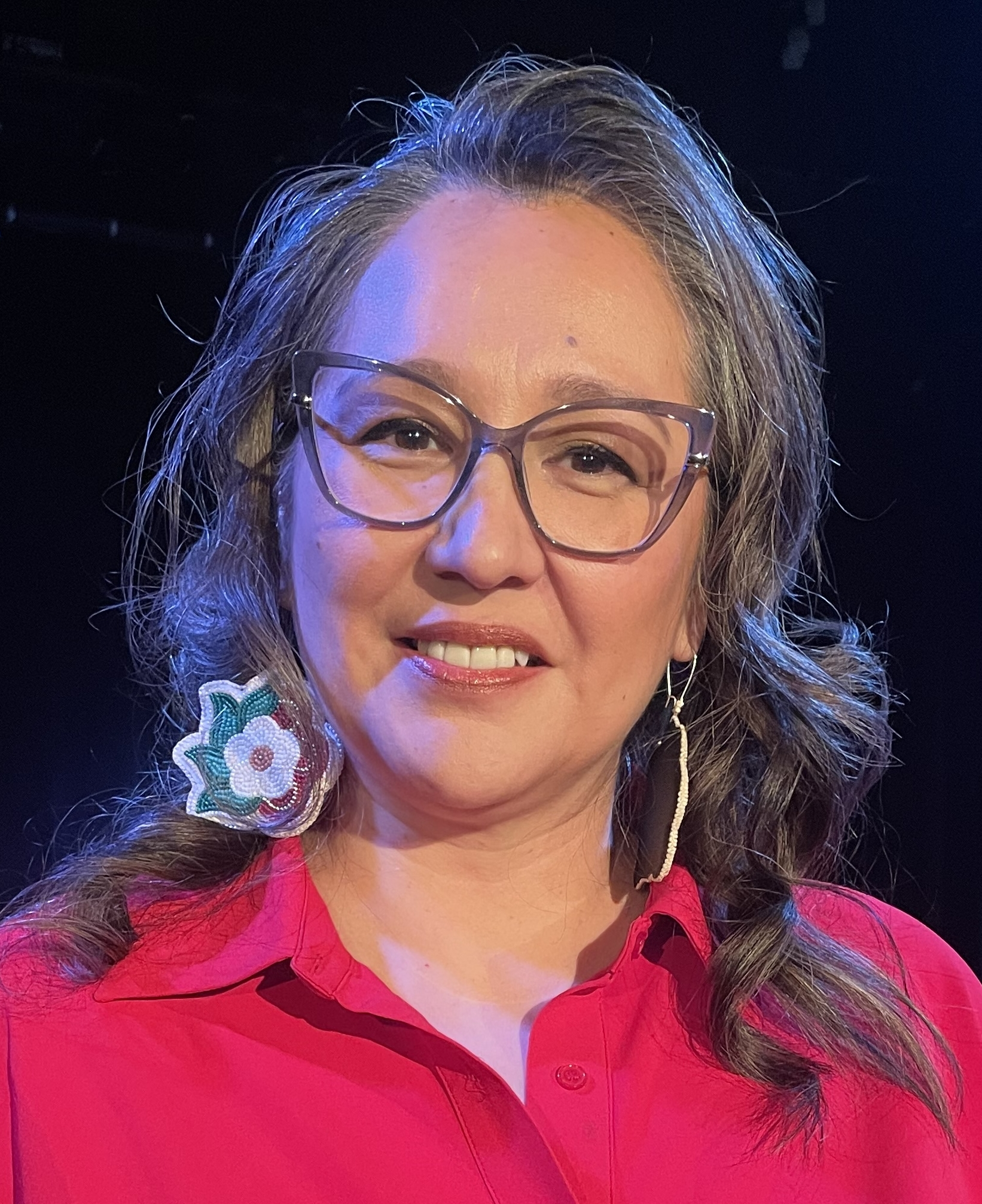

Minister of Indigenous Services
- Incumbent
- Assumed office May 13, 2025
- Prime Minister: Mark Carney
- Preceded by: Patty Hajdu

Member of Parliament for Abitibi—Baie-James—Nunavik—Eeyou
- Incumbent
- Assumed office April 28, 2025
- Preceded by: Sylvie Bérubé

Personal details
- Born: May 23, 1980 (age 46) Waswanipi, Quebec, Canada
- Party: Liberal

Mandy Shana Gull-Masty PC MP (born May 23, 1980) is a Canadian politician who has been Minister of Indigenous Services since 2025. A member of the Liberal Party, Gull-Masty was elected as the member of Parliament (MP) for Abitibi—Baie-James—Nunavik—Eeyou, Quebec, in 2025. Before entering federal politics, she was Grand Chief of the Grand Council of the Crees from 2021 to 2025, and was the first woman to hold this position.

== Personal life ==
Gull-Masty was born in Waswanipi in 1980. She is a Cree from Waswanipi Cree Nation. She gave birth to her first child at 14 years old. She graduated with a diploma in social science from Dawson College and later completed two bachelor's degrees, one in political science and the other in public and community affairs and policy analysis at Concordia University.

Gull-Masty is the mother of four children. At the time of the 2025 Canadian federal election, she lived in Chibougamau.

== Political career ==
She was first elected as the Deputy Chief of Waswanipi in 2014 and responsible for finance, administration, housing and mining negotiation portfolios. In 2017, she was elected as Deputy Grand Chief of the Grand Council of the Crees. In 2021, she was elected as the Grand Chief of the Grand Council of the Crees (Eeyou Istchee) and became the first woman to hold this position. She stepped down from this position in March 2025 to run for the Liberal Party in the federal election. She was elected in the 2025 federal election for the riding of Abitibi—Baie-James—Nunavik—Eeyou, defeating Bloc Québécois incumbent Sylvie Bérubé who held this riding from 2019 to 2025. On May 13, 2025, she joined Prime Minister Mark Carney's 30th Canadian Ministry as Minister of Indigenous Services, becoming the first Indigenous person in the role.

Order of precedence
Preceded by Lena Diab as Member of the Cabinet	Order of Precedence of Canada as Member of the Cabinet	Succeeded by Tim Hodgson as Member of the Cabinet
