= Minister responsible for the Economic Development Agency of Canada for the Regions of Quebec =

Canadian cabinet position

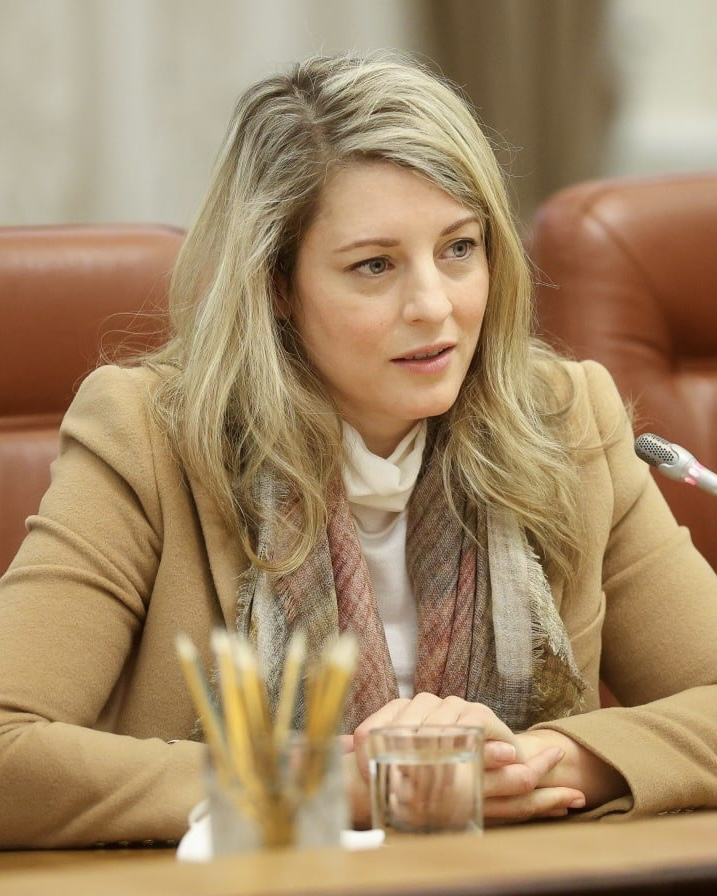
- Incumbent; Mélanie Joly since May 13, 2025
- Economic Development Agency for the Regions of Quebec
- Style: The Honourable
- Member of: Cabinet; Privy Council
- Appointer: Monarch (represented by the governor general) on the advice of the prime minister
- Term length: At His Majesty's pleasure
- Inaugural holder: Jean Charest
- Formation: June 25, 1993

The title Minister responsible for the Economic Development Agency of Canada for the Regions of Quebec was accorded to full members of the Cabinet of Canada from the Campbell Ministry through the first months of Paul Martin government. Prior to the agency's renaming in 1998, the position was termed Minister responsible for the Federal Office of Regional Development – Quebec.

Ministers responsible have included Jean Charest, Paul Martin, and John Manley.

In 2002, Claude Drouin became the only Secretary of State for the Economic Development Agency of Canada for the regions of Quebec that was created to succeed from the former position of Secretary of State (Federal Office of Regional Development – Quebec) which had existed since 1996 with Martin Cauchon in the position. When Prime Minister Paul Martin did away with the sub-Cabinet position of Secretary of State, he reverted the structure to how it had been constituted before 1996, with Industry Minister Lucienne Robillard assuming the title.

After the 2004 Canadian election the portfolio was cut loose as an autonomous office, the Minister of the Economic Development Agency of Canada for the Regions of Quebec, and given to Jacques Saada. It then passed to Jean-Pierre Blackburn and Denis Lebel.

The pre-2004 portfolio was revived when Pascale St-Onge was appointed responsible for it in 2021; she would return to the role in February 2025.

== Ministers ==
Key:

Liberal Party of Canada
Progressive Conservative Party of Canada

=== Ministers responsible for the Federal Office of Regional Development – Quebec (1993–1998) ===
No.	Minister	Secretary	Term of office		Political party	Ministry
1	Jean Charest	—	June 25, 1993	November 3, 1993	Progressive Conservative	25 (Campbell)
2	Paul Martin	—	November 4, 1993	January 24, 1996	Liberal	26 (Chrétien)
3	John Manley	Martin Cauchon	January 25, 1996	February 12, 1998	Liberal	26 (Chrétien)
=== Ministers responsible for the Economic Development Agency of Canada for the Regions of Quebec (1998–2004) ===
3	John Manley (cont'd)	Martin Cauchon	February 13, 1998	October 16, 2000	Liberal	26 (Chrétien)
4	Brian Tobin	Martin Cauchon	October 17, 2000	January 14, 2002	Liberal	26 (Chrétien)
VACANT		Claude Drouin	January 15, 2002	December 11, 2003	Liberal	26 (Chrétien)
5	Lucienne Robillard	—	December 12, 2003	July 19, 2004	Liberal	27 (Martin)
=== Ministers responsible for the Economic Development Agency of Canada for the Regions of Quebec (2021–present) ===
9	Pascale St-Onge	—	October 26, 2021	July 26, 2023	Liberal	29 (Trudeau)
10	Soraya Martinez Ferrada	—	July 26, 2023	February 6, 2025	Liberal	29 (Trudeau)
(9)	Pascale St-Onge	—	February 6, 2025	March 14, 2025	Liberal	29 (Trudeau)
—	VACANT					30 (Carney)
11	Melanie Joly	—	May 13, 2025		Liberal	30 (Carney)

Martin Cauchon handled most day-to-day responsibilities for this portfolio as Secretary of State (Federal Office of Regional Development – Quebec) from January 25, 1996 to February 12, 1998, and continued as Secretary of State (Economic Development Agency for the Regions of Quebec) until January 14, 2002. His replacement, Claude Drouin, would handle virtually all responsibilities for this portfolio as Secretary of State (Economic Development Agency for the Regions of Quebec) for the remainder of the Chrétien Ministry.

The portfolio became a full-fledged ministerial posting, Minister of the Economic Development Agency of Canada for the Regions of Quebec, in 2004.
