= Oza Tétrault =

Canadian politician

Member of Parliament for Villeneuve
- In office June 1968 – May 1974

Personal details
- Born: 1 May 1908 Noëlville, Ontario
- Died: 17 October 1995 (aged 87)
- Party: Social Credit
- Profession: president/manager

Oza Tétrault (1 May 1908 – 17 October 1995) was a Ralliement créditiste and Social Credit party member of the House of Commons of Canada. He was a president and manager by career.

He was first elected at the Villeneuve riding in the 1968 general election under the Ralliement créditiste party banner. He was re-elected at Villeneuve in the 1972 election, with his party assuming the Social Credit name in 1971. After completing his term in the 29th Canadian Parliament, Tétrault left federal politics and did not campaign in any further federal elections.

His son, Ronald Tétrault, became a Quebec provincial and municipal politician.
