= Villeneuve (electoral district) =

Former federal electoral district in Quebec, Canada

Quebec electoral district

Defunct federal electoral district
- Legislature: House of Commons
- District created: 1947
- District abolished: 1976
- First contested: 1949
- Last contested: 1974

Villeneuve (French pronunciation: [vilnœv]) was a federal electoral district in Quebec, Canada, that was represented in the House of Commons of Canada from 1949 to 1979.

This riding was created in 1947 from parts of Pontiac riding. It consisted initially of:

- the southwestern part of the county of Abitibi; and
- parts of the county of Témiscamingue including the towns of Mercier, Noranda and Rouyn.

In 1952, it was redefined to consist of:

- parts of the county of Abitibi including the towns of Bourlamarque, Cadillac, Duparquet, Malartic and Val-d'Or;
- the northern parts of the county of Témiscamingue including the cities of Noranda and Rouyn.

In 1966, it was redefined to consist of:

- the Towns of Barville, Bourlamaque, Cadillac, Chapais, Chibougamau, Lebel-sur-Quévillon, Malartic, Senneterre and Val-d'Or;
- parts of the County of Abitibi; and
- parts of the County of Témiscamingue.

The electoral district was abolished in 1976 when it was redistributed into Abitibi and Témiscamingue ridings.

== Members of Parliament ==
This riding elected the following members of Parliament:

Parliament	Years	Member	Party
Villeneuve; Riding created from Pontiac
21st	1949–1953	Armand Dumas	Liberal
22nd	1953–1957	Armand Dumas	Liberal
23rd	1957–1958	Armand Dumas	Liberal
24th	1958–1962	Armand Dumas	Liberal
25th	1962–1963	Réal Caouette	Social Credit
26th	1963–1963	Réal Caouette	Social Credit
26th	1963–1965	Réal Caouette	Ralliement créditiste
27th	1965–1968	Réal Caouette	Ralliement créditiste
28th	1968–1971	Oza Tétrault	Ralliement créditiste
28th	1971–1972	Oza Tétrault	Social Credit
29th	1972–1974	Oza Tétrault	Social Credit
30th	1974–1979	Armand Caouette	Social Credit
Riding dissolved into Abitibi and Témiscamingue

== Election results ==
1949 Canadian federal election
Party	Candidate	Votes
Liberal	Armand Dumas	13,597
Union des électeurs	Réal Caouette	10,980
Progressive Conservative	Louis-Charles Trempe	958
Independent PC	Henri-L. Devost	291
Independent Liberal	François-Xavier Généreux	102

1953 Canadian federal election
Party	Candidate	Votes
Liberal	Armand Dumas	14,851
Progressive Conservative	Jacques Thivierge	7,015
Independent	Henri-L. Devost	1,097

1957 Canadian federal election
Party	Candidate	Votes
Liberal	Armand Dumas	9,893
Candidat des électeurs	Réal Caouette	8,129
Progressive Conservative	André Lemieux	6,034
Co-operative Commonwealth	Thérèse-F. Casgrain	1,947

1958 Canadian federal election
Party	Candidate	Votes
Liberal	Armand Dumas	10,102
Progressive Conservative	André Lemieux	9,811
Candidat des électeurs	Réal Caouette	8,276
Co-operative Commonwealth	Yvon Parent	662

1962 Canadian federal election
Party	Candidate	Votes
Social Credit	Réal Caouette	21,022
Liberal	L.-D. Pilon	6,831
Progressive Conservative	Marc Cloutier	2,441
New Democratic	Jean-Paul Bonneau	981

1963 Canadian federal election
Party	Candidate	Votes
Social Credit	Réal Caouette	18,096
Liberal	Stephen Cuddihy	7,270
New Democratic	Roger Bédard	2,279
Progressive Conservative	Marc Cloutier	2,235

1965 Canadian federal election
Party	Candidate	Votes
Ralliement créditiste	Réal Caouette	19,839
Liberal	Joseph Morin	5,397
Progressive Conservative	J.-O.-Raymond Rochon	1,924
New Democratic	Clermont Nadeau	1,496

1968 Canadian federal election
Party	Candidate	Votes
Ralliement créditiste	Oza Tétrault	10,073
Liberal	André Roy	7,994
Progressive Conservative	J.-Eugène Bérard	2,182
New Democratic	Wilfrid Legault	886

1972 Canadian federal election
Party	Candidate	Votes
Social Credit	Oza Tétrault	12,070
Liberal	Gaston Charest	10,719
Progressive Conservative	Guy Larocque	1,462
New Democratic	Fernand Turgeon	1,042

1974 Canadian federal election
Party	Candidate	Votes
Social Credit	Armand Caouette	10,452
Liberal	Gaston Charest	8,905
Progressive Conservative	Louis-Paul Dionne	3,006
New Democratic	Louis-Marie Meilleur	1,205

== See also ==
- List of Canadian electoral districts
- Historical federal electoral districts of Canada
