= Department of Defence Production (Canada) =

The Department of Defence Production was a Government of Canada department responsible for the centralized planning and purchasing of military equipment. It was created in 1951 (replacing the Department of Reconstruction and Supply that existed from 1945 to 1948 and earlier Department of Munitions and Supply and Department of Reconstruction) and disbanded in 1969 and its duties devolved to the individual branches of the military.
