= By-elections to the 12th Canadian Parliament =

By-elections to the 12th Canadian Parliament were held to elect members of the House of Commons of Canada between the 1911 federal election and the 1917 federal election. The Conservative Party of Canada led a majority government for the 12th Canadian Parliament.

The list includes Ministerial by-elections which occurred due to the requirement that Members of Parliament recontest their seats upon being appointed to Cabinet. These by-elections were almost always uncontested. This requirement was abolished in 1931.

By-election	Date	Incumbent	Party	Winner	Party	Cause	Retained
Dorchester	January 27, 1917	Albert Sévigny	Conservative	Albert Sévigny	Conservative	Recontested upon appointment as Minister of Inland Revenue	Yes
Toronto East	December 14, 1916	Albert Edward Kemp	Conservative	Albert Edward Kemp	Conservative	Recontested upon appointment as Minister of Militia and Defence	Yes
Hochelaga	October 15, 1915	Louis Coderre	Conservative	Esioff-Léon Patenaude	Conservative	Appointed a judge of the Superior Court of Quebec	Yes
Terrebonne	February 8, 1915	Wilfrid Bruno Nantel	Conservative	Gédéon Rochon	Conservative	Appointed a Railway Commissioner	Yes
Westmorland	February 1, 1915	Henry Emmerson	Liberal	Arthur Bliss Copp	Liberal	Death	Yes
Jacques Cartier	February 1, 1915	Frederick D. Monk	Conservative	Joseph Adélard DesCarries	Conservative	Resignation (ill health)	Yes
Prince Albert	February 1, 1915	James McKay	Conservative	Samuel James Donaldson	Conservative	Appointed a judge of the Supreme Court of Saskatchewan	Yes
London	February 1, 1915	Thomas Beattie	Conservative	William Gray	Conservative	Death	Yes
Waterloo South	February 1, 1915	George Adam Clare	Conservative	Frank Stewart Scott	Conservative	Death	Yes
Champlain	November 7, 1914	Pierre Édouard Blondin	Conservative	Pierre Édouard Blondin	Conservative	Recontested upon appointment as Minister of Inland Revenue	Yes
Quebec County	November 7, 1914	Louis-Philippe Pelletier	Conservative	Thomas Chase-Casgrain	Conservative	Resignation prior to being appointed a judge	Yes
York	December 31, 1913	Oswald Smith Crocket	Conservative	Harry Fulton McLeod	Conservative	Appointed a judge of the Supreme Court of New Brunswick	Yes
Lanark South	December 13, 1913	John Graham Haggart	Conservative	Adelbert Edward Hanna	Conservative	Death	Yes
Macdonald	December 13, 1913	Alexander Morrison	Conservative	Alexander Morrison	Conservative	Election declared void	Yes
Bruce South	October 30, 1913	James J. Donnelly	Conservative	Reuben Eldridge Truax	Liberal	Called to the Senate	No
Middlesex East	October 21, 1913	Peter Elson	Conservative	Samuel Francis Glass	Conservative	Death	Yes
Châteauguay	October 11, 1913	James Pollock Brown	Liberal	James Morris	Conservative	Death	No
Portage la Prairie	July 19, 1913	Arthur Meighen	Conservative	Arthur Meighen	Conservative	Recontested upon appointment as Solicitor General	Yes
Hochelaga	November 19, 1912	Louis Coderre	Conservative	Louis Coderre	Conservative	Recontested upon appointment as Secretary of State for Canada	Yes
Carleton	October 30, 1912	Edward Kidd	Conservative	William Foster Garland	Conservative	Death	Yes
Richelieu	October 24, 1912	Arthur Cardin	Liberal	Arthur Cardin	Liberal	Election declared void	Yes
Macdonald	October 12, 1912	William D. Staples	Conservative	Alexander Morrison	Conservative	Appointed Grain Commissioner for Canada	Yes
Simcoe South	June 10, 1912	Haughton Lennox	Conservative	William Alves Boys	Conservative	Appointed a judge	Yes
Kootenay	May 30, 1912	Arthur Samuel Goodeve	Conservative	Robert Francis Green	Conservative	Appointed a Railway Commissioner	Yes
Renfrew South	February 22, 1912	Thomas Andrew Low	Liberal	George Perry Graham	Liberal	Resignation	Yes
Nipissing	November 8, 1911	George Gordon	Conservative	Francis Cochrane	Conservative	Called to the Senate	Yes
Leeds	November 6, 1911	George Taylor	Conservative	William Thomas White	Conservative	Called to the Senate	Yes
Yale—Cariboo	November 4, 1911	Martin Burrell	Conservative	Martin Burrell	Conservative	Recontested upon appointment as Minister of Agriculture	Yes
Halifax	October 27, 1911	Robert Borden	Conservative	Robert Borden	Conservative	Recontested upon appointment as Prime Minister	Yes
Elgin West	October 27, 1911	Thomas Wilson Crothers	Conservative	Thomas Wilson Crothers	Conservative	Recontested upon appointment as Minister of Labour	Yes
St. Anne	October 27, 1911	Charles Doherty	Conservative	Charles Doherty	Conservative	Recontested upon appointment as Minister of Justice	Yes
Toronto North	October 27, 1911	George Eulas Foster	Conservative	George Eulas Foster	Conservative	Recontested upon appointment as Minister of Trade and Commerce	Yes
City and County of St. John	October 27, 1911	John Waterhouse Daniel	Conservative	John Douglas Hazen	Conservative	Resignation to provide a seat for Hazen	Yes
Victoria	October 27, 1911	Sam Hughes	Liberal-Conservative	Sam Hughes	Liberal-Conservative	Recontested upon appointment as Minister of Militia and Defence	Yes
Jacques Cartier	October 27, 1911	Frederick Debartzch Monk	Conservative	Frederick Debartzch Monk	Conservative	Recontested upon appointment as Minister of Public Works	Yes
Terrebonne	October 27, 1911	Wilfrid Bruno Nantel	Conservative	Wilfrid Bruno Nantel	Conservative	Recontested upon appointment as Minister of Inland Revenue	Yes
Quebec County	October 27, 1911	Louis-Philippe Pelletier	Conservative	Louis-Philippe Pelletier	Conservative	Recontested upon appointment as Postmaster-General	Yes
Grenville	October 27, 1911	John Dowsley Reid	Conservative	John Dowsley Reid	Conservative	Recontested upon appointment as Minister of Customs	Yes
Marquette	October 27, 1911	William James Roche	Conservative	William James Roche	Conservative	Recontested upon appointment as Secretary of State for Canada	Yes
Winnipeg	October 27, 1911	Alexander Haggart	Conservative	Robert Rogers	Conservative	Resignation to provide a seat for Rogers	Yes

== See also ==
- List of federal by-elections in Canada

== Sources ==
- Parliament of Canada–Elected in By-Elections
