= 12th Canadian Parliament =

1911–17 national legislative term

- Majority parliament
- Nov. 15, 1911 – Oct. 6, 1917

Parliament leaders
- Prime minister: Robert Borden; Oct. 10, 1911 – Jul. 10, 1920
- Cabinet: 9th Canadian Ministry
- Leader of the Opposition: Wilfrid Laurier; 10 Oct. 1911 – 17 Feb. 1919

Party caucuses
- Government: Conservative Party & Liberal-Conservative
- Opposition: Liberal Party
- Crossbench: Labour

House of Commons
- Seating arrangements of the House of Commons
- Speaker of the Commons: Thomas Simpson Sproule; 15 November 1911 – 2 December 1915
- Albert Sévigny; 12 January 1916 – 7 January 1917
- Edgar Nelson Rhodes; 18 January 1917 – 5 March 1922

Senate
- Speaker of the Senate: Auguste Landry; 23 October 1911 – 2 June 1916
- Joseph Bolduc; 3 June 1916 – 6 February 1922
- Government Senate leader: James Alexander Lougheed; 10 October 1911 – 28 December 1921
- Opposition Senate leader: Richard John Cartwright; 6 October 1911 – 24 September 1912
- George William Ross; 24 September 1912 – 7 March 1914
- Hewitt Bostock; 19 March 1914 – 1 January 1919

Sovereign
- Monarch: George V 6 May 1910 – 20 January 1936
- Governor general: Prince Arthur; 13 Oct. 1911 – 11 Nov. 1916
- The Duke of Devonshire; 11 Nov. 1916 – 11 Aug. 1921

Sessions
- 1st session 15 November 1911 – 1 April 1912
- 2nd session 21 November 1912 – 6 June 1913
- 3rd session 15 January 1914 – 12 June 1914
- 4th session 18 August 1914 – 22 August 1914
- 5th session 4 February 1915 – 15 April 1915
- 6th session 12 January 1916 – 18 May 1916
- 7th session 18 January 1917 – 20 September 1917
← 11th	→ 13th

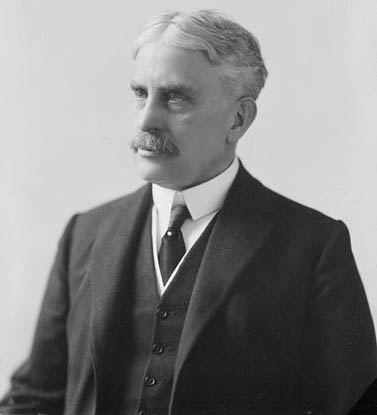
Sir Robert Borden was Prime Minister during the 12th Canadian Parliament.

The 12th Canadian Parliament was in session from 15 November 1911 until 6 October 1917. The membership was set by the 1911 federal election on 21 September 1911, and it changed only somewhat due to resignations and by-elections until it was dissolved prior to the 1917 election. At 5 years, 10 months and 22 days, it was the longest parliament in Canadian history. The parliament was extended beyond the normal limit of five years by the British North America Act, 1916 as a result of World War I.

It was controlled by a Conservative/Liberal-Conservative majority under Prime Minister Sir Robert Borden and the 9th Canadian Ministry. The Official Opposition was the Liberal Party, led by Wilfrid Laurier. The last year of the wartime parliament was dominated by the Conscription Crisis of 1917. At the end of the parliament, a new ministry, the Union Government, was formed by Borden as a wartime coalition government including Liberals. Laurier refused to join and those Liberals who supported Borden took the name Liberal-Unionists. The Union Government went on to win the 1917 federal election.

The Speaker was first Thomas Simpson Sproule, and later Albert Sévigny. See also List of Canadian electoral districts 1907-1914 for a list of the ridings in this parliament.

There were seven sessions of the 12th Parliament:

Session	Start	End
1st	15 November 1911	1 April 1912
2nd	21 November 1912	6 June 1913
3rd	15 January 1914	12 June 1914
4th	18 August 1914	22 August 1914
5th	4 February 1915	15 April 1915
6th	12 January 1916	18 May 1916
7th	18 January 1917	20 September 1917

== List of members ==
Following is a full list of members of the twelfth Parliament listed first by province, then by electoral district.

Key:

- Party leaders are italicized.
- Parliamentary secretaries is indicated by "‡".
- Cabinet ministers are in **boldface**.
- The Prime Minister is **both**.
- The Speaker is indicated by "(†)".

Electoral districts denoted by an asterisk (*) indicates that district was represented by two members.

=== Alberta ===
Electoral district	Name	Party	First elected/previously elected	No. of terms
Calgary	Richard Bedford Bennett	Conservative	1911	1st term
Edmonton	Frank Oliver	Liberal	1896	5th term
Macleod	David Warnock	Liberal	1911	1st term
Medicine Hat	William Ashbury Buchanan	Liberal	1911	1st term
Red Deer	Michael Clark	Liberal	1908	2nd term
Strathcona	James McCrie Douglas	Liberal	1909	2nd term
Victoria	William Henry White	Liberal	1908	2nd term

=== British Columbia ===
Electoral district	Name	Party	First elected/previously elected	No. of terms
Comox—Atlin	Herbert Sylvester Clements	Conservative	1904, (Note: Kent West (Ontario)) 1911	2nd term*
Kootenay	Arthur Samuel Goodeve (until 4 May 1912 railway appointment)	Conservative	1908	2nd term
Kootenay	Robert Francis Green (by-election of 30 May 1912)	Conservative	1912	1st term
Nanaimo	Francis Henry Shepherd	Conservative	1911	1st term
New Westminster	James Davis Taylor	Conservative	1908	2nd term
Vancouver City	Henry Herbert Stevens	Conservative	1911	1st term
Victoria City	George Henry Barnard	Conservative	1908	2nd term
Yale—Cariboo	**Martin Burrell** (until 10 October 1911 ministerial appointment)	Conservative	1908	2nd term
Yale—Cariboo	**Martin Burrell** (by-election of 4 November 1911)	Conservative	1908	2nd term

=== Manitoba ===
Electoral district	Name	Party	First elected/previously elected	No. of terms
Brandon	James Albert Manning Aikins	Conservative	1911	1st term
Dauphin	Robert Cruise	Liberal	1911	1st term
Lisgar	William Henry Sharpe	Conservative	1908	2nd term
Macdonald	William D. Staples (until 10 April 1912 commissioner appointment)	Conservative	1904	3rd term
Macdonald	Alexander Morrison (by-election of 12 October 1912, until election voided 10 November 1913)	Conservative	1912	1st term
Macdonald	Alexander Morrison (by-election of 13 December 1913)	Conservative	1912	1st term
Marquette	**William James Roche** (until 10 October 1911 Secretary of State appointment)	Conservative	1896	5th term
Marquette	**William James Roche** (by-election of 27 October 1911)	Conservative	1896	5th term
Portage la Prairie	**Arthur Meighen** (until 26 June 1913 Solicitor General appointment)	Conservative	1908	2nd term
Portage la Prairie	**Arthur Meighen** (by-election of 19 July 1913)	Conservative	1908	2nd term
Provencher	John Patrick Molloy	Liberal	1908	2nd term
Selkirk	George Henry Bradbury	Conservative	1908	2nd term
Souris	Frederick Laurence Schaffner	Conservative	1904	3rd term
Winnipeg	Alexander Haggart (resigned 11 October 1911)	Conservative	1908	2nd term
Winnipeg	**Robert Rogers** (by-election of 27 October 1911)	Conservative	1911	1st term

=== New Brunswick ===
Electoral district	Name	Party	First elected/previously elected	No. of terms
Carleton	Frank Broadstreet Carvell	Liberal	1904	3rd term
Charlotte	Thomas Aaron Hartt	Conservative	1911	1st term
City and County of St. John	John Waterhouse Daniel (resigned 17 October 1911)	Conservative	1904	4th term
City and County of St. John	**John Douglas Hazen** (by-election of 27 October 1911)	Conservative	1891, 1911	2nd term*
City of St. John	William Pugsley	Liberal	1904	3rd term
Gloucester	Onésiphore Turgeon	Liberal	1900	4th term
Kent	Ferdinand-Joseph Robidoux	Conservative	1911	1st term
King's and Albert	George William Fowler	Conservative	1900, 1911	3rd term*
Northumberland	William Stewart Loggie	Liberal	1904	3rd term
Restigouche	James Reid	Liberal	1900	4th term
Sunbury—Queen's	Hugh Havelock McLean	Liberal	1908	2nd term
Victoria	Pius Michaud	Liberal	1907	3rd term
Westmorland	Henry Emmerson (died 9 July 1914)	Liberal	1900	4th term
Westmorland	Arthur Bliss Copp (by-election of 1 February 1915)	Liberal	1915	1st term
York	Oswald Smith Crocket (until 11 December 1913 judicial appointment)	Conservative	1904	3rd term
York	Harry Fulton McLeod (by-election of 31 December 1913)	Conservative	1913	1st term

=== Nova Scotia ===
Electoral district	Name	Party	First elected/previously elected	No. of terms
Annapolis	Avard Longley Davidson	Conservative	1911	1st term
Antigonish	William Chisholm	Liberal	1905	3rd term
Cape Breton South	William F. Carroll	Liberal	1911	1st term
Colchester	John Stanfield	Conservative	1907	3rd term
Cumberland	Edgar Nelson Rhodes (†)	Conservative	1908	2nd term
Digby	Clarence Jameson	Conservative	1908	2nd term
Guysborough	John Howard Sinclair	Liberal	1904	4th term
Halifax*	**Robert Laird Borden** (until 10 October 1911 Prime Minister appointment)	Conservative	1896, 1905	5th term*
Halifax*	**Robert Laird Borden** (by-election of 27 October 1911)	Conservative	1896, 1905	5th term*
Halifax*	**Alexander Kenneth Maclean**	Liberal	1904	3rd term
Hants	Hadley Brown Tremain	Conservative	1911	1st term
Inverness	Alexander William Chisholm	Liberal	1908	2nd term
Kings	Arthur de Witt Foster	Conservative	1911	1st term
Lunenburg	Dugald Stewart	Conservative	1911	1st term
North Cape Breton and Victoria	Daniel Duncan McKenzie	Liberal	1904, 1908	3rd term*
Pictou	Edward Mortimer Macdonald	Liberal	1904	3rd term
Richmond	George William Kyte	Liberal	1908	2nd term
Shelburne and Queen's	Fleming Blanchard McCurdy ‡	Conservative	1911	1st term
Yarmouth	Bowman Brown Law	Liberal	1902	4th term
Yarmouth	Bowman Brown Law died in the 1916 Parliament fire	Vacant		

=== Ontario ===
Electoral district	Name	Party	First elected/previously elected	No. of terms
Algoma East	William Ross Smyth	Conservative	1908	2nd term
Algoma West	Arthur Cyril Boyce	Conservative	1904	3rd term
Brantford	William Foster Cockshutt	Conservative	1904, 1911	2nd term*
Brant	John Henry Fisher	Conservative	1911	1st term
Brockville	John Webster	Conservative	1911	1st term
Bruce North	Hugh Clark ‡	Conservative	1911	1st term
Bruce South	James J. Donnelly (until 26 May 1913 Senate appointment)	Conservative	1904, 1908	3rd term*
Bruce South	Reuben Eldridge Truax (by-election of 30 October 1913)	Liberal	1913	1st term
Carleton	Edward Kidd (died 16 September 1912)	Conservative	1909	2nd term
Carleton	William Foster Garland (by-election of 30 October 1912)	Conservative	1912	1st term
Dufferin	John Best	Conservative	1909	2nd term
Dundas	Andrew Broder	Conservative	1896	5th term
Durham	**Charles Jonas Thornton**	Conservative	1900, 1908	3rd term*
Elgin East	David Marshall	Conservative	1906	3rd term
Elgin West	**Thomas Wilson Crothers** (until 10 October 1911 ministerial appointment)	Conservative	1908	2nd term
Elgin West	**Thomas Wilson Crothers** (by-election of 27 October 1911)	Conservative	1908	2nd term
Essex North	Oliver James Wilcox	Conservative	1909	2nd term
Essex South	Alfred Henry Clarke	Liberal	1904	3rd term
Frontenac	John Wesley Edwards	Conservative	1908	2nd term
Glengarry	John Angus McMillan	Liberal	1908	2nd term
Grenville	**John Dowsley Reid** (until 10 October 1911 ministerial appointment)	Conservative	1896	5th term
Grenville	**John Dowsley Reid** (by-election of 27 October 1911)	Conservative	1896	5th term
Grey East	Thomas Simpson Sproule (†)	Conservative	1878	9th term
Grey North	William Sora Middlebro	Conservative	1908	2nd term
Grey South	Robert James Ball	Conservative	1911	1st term
Haldimand	Francis Ramsey Lalor	Conservative	1904	3rd term
Halton	David Henderson	Conservative	1887, 1888	8th term*
Hamilton East	**Samuel Barker**	Conservative	1900	4th term
Hamilton West	Thomas Joseph Stewart	Conservative	1908	2nd term
Hastings East	William Barton Northrup	Conservative	1892, 1900	5th term*
Hastings West	Edward Guss Porter	Conservative	1902	4th term
Huron East	James Bowman	Conservative	1911	1st term
Huron South	Jonathan Joseph Merner	Conservative	1911	1st term
Huron West	Edward Norman Lewis	Conservative	1904	3rd term
Kent East	David Alexander Gordon	Liberal	1904	3rd term
Kent West	Archibald Blake McCoig	Liberal	1908	2nd term
Kingston	William Folger Nickle	Conservative	1911	1st term
Lambton East	Joseph Elijah Armstrong	Conservative	1904	4th term
Lambton West	Frederick Forsyth Pardee	Liberal	1905	3rd term
Lanark North	William Thoburn	Conservative	1908	2nd term
Lanark South	John Graham Haggart (died 13 March 1913)	Conservative	1872	11th term
Lanark South	Adelbert Edward Hanna (by-election of 13 December 1913)	Conservative	1913	1st term
Leeds	George Taylor (resigned 25 October 1911)	Conservative	1882	8th term
Leeds	**William Thomas White** (by-election of 6 November 1911)	Conservative	1911	1st term
Lennox and Addington	William James Paul	Conservative	1911	1st term
Lincoln	Edward Arthur Lancaster	Conservative	1900	4th term
London	Thomas Beattie (died 2 December 1914)	Conservative	1891, 1900	5th term*
London	William Gray (by-election of 1 February 1915)	Conservative	1915	1st term
Middlesex East	Peter Elson (died 11 June 1913)	Conservative	1904	3rd term
Middlesex East	Samuel Francis Glass (by-election of 21 October 1913)	Conservative	1913	1st term
Middlesex North	George Adam Elliott	Conservative	1911	1st term
Middlesex West	Duncan Campbell Ross	Liberal	1909	2nd term
Muskoka	William Wright	Conservative	1904	3rd term
Nipissing	George Gordon (resigned 25 October 1911)	Conservative	1908	2nd term
Nipissing	**Francis Cochrane** (by-election of 8 November 1911)	Conservative	1911	1st term
Norfolk	William Andrew Charlton	Liberal	1911	1st term
Northumberland East	Henry Joseph Walker	Conservative	1911	1st term
Northumberland West	Charles Arthur Munson	Conservative	1911	1st term
Ontario North	Samuel Simpson Sharpe	Conservative	1908	2nd term
Ontario South	William Smith	Conservative	1887, 1892, 1911	3rd term*
Ottawa (City of)*	John Léo Chabot	Conservative	1911	1st term
Ottawa (City of)*	Alfred Ernest Fripp	Conservative	1911	1st term
Oxford North	Edward Walter Nesbitt	Liberal	1908	2nd term
Oxford South	Donald Sutherland	Conservative	1911	1st term
Parry Sound	James Arthurs	Conservative	1908	2nd term
Peel	Richard Blain	Conservative	1900	4th term
Perth North	Hugh Boulton Morphy	Conservative	1911	1st term
Perth South	Michael Steele	Conservative	1911	1st term
Peterborough East	John Albert Sexsmith	Conservative	1908	2nd term
Peterborough West	John Hampden Burnham	Conservative	1911	1st term
Prescott	Edmond Proulx	Liberal	1904	3rd term
Prince Edward	Bernard Rickart Hepburn	Conservative	1911	1st term
Renfrew North	Gerald Verner White	Conservative	1906	3rd term
Renfrew South	Thomas Andrew Low (until resignation)	Liberal	1908	2nd term
Renfrew South	George Perry Graham (by-election of 22 February 1912)	Liberal	1907, (Note: Brockville) 1912	3rd term*
Russell	Charles Murphy	Liberal	1904	3rd term
Simcoe East	William Humphrey Bennett	Conservative	1892, 1911	6th term*
Simcoe North	John Allister Currie	Conservative	1908	2nd term
Simcoe South	Haughton Lennox (until judicial appointment)	Conservative	1900	4th term
Simcoe South	William Alves Boys (by-election of 10 June 1912)	Conservative	1912	1st term
Stormont	Duncan Orestes Alguire	Conservative	1911	1st term
Thunder Bay and Rainy River	John James Carrick	Conservative	1911	1st term
Toronto Centre	Edmund James Bristol	Conservative	1905	3rd term
Toronto East	**Albert Edward Kemp** (until ministerial appointment)	Conservative	1900, 1911	3rd term*
Toronto East	**Albert Edward Kemp** (by-election of 14 December 1916)	Conservative	1900, 1911	3rd term*
Toronto North	**George Eulas Foster** (until ministerial appointment)	Conservative	1882, (Note: King's/York (New Brunswick)) 1904	7th term*
Toronto North	**George Eulas Foster** (by-election of 27 October 1911)	Conservative	1882, 1904	
Toronto South	Angus Claude Macdonell	Conservative	1904	3rd term
Toronto West	Edmund Boyd Osler	Conservative	1896	5th term
Victoria	**Sam Hughes** (until ministerial appointment)	Liberal-Conservative	1892	6th term
Victoria	**Sam Hughes** (by-election of 27 October 1911)	Liberal-Conservative	1892	6th term
Waterloo North	William George Weichel	Conservative	1911	1st term
Waterloo South	George Adam Clare (died in office)	Conservative	1900	4th term
Waterloo South	Frank Stewart Scott (by-election of 1 February 1915)	Conservative	1915	1st term
Welland	William Manly German	Liberal	1891, 1900	5th term*
Wellington North	William Aurelius Clarke	Conservative	1911	1st term
Wellington South	**Hugh Guthrie**	Liberal	1900	4th term
Wentworth	Gordon Crooks Wilson	Conservative	1911	1st term
York Centre	Thomas George Wallace	Conservative	1908	2nd term
York North	John Alexander Macdonald Armstrong	Conservative	1911	1st term
York South	William Findlay Maclean	Independent Conservative	1892	6th term

=== Prince Edward Island ===
Electoral district	Name	Party	First elected/previously elected	No. of terms
King's	James Joseph Hughes	Liberal	1900, 1911	2nd term*
Prince	James William Richards	Liberal	1908	2nd term
Queen's*	Angus Alexander McLean	Conservative	1904, 1911	2nd term*
Queen's*	Donald Nicholson	Conservative	1911	1st term

=== Quebec ===
Electoral district	Name	Party	First elected/previously elected	No. of terms
Argenteuil	**George Halsey Perley**	Conservative	1904	3rd term
Bagot	Joseph Edmond Marcile	Liberal	1898	5th term
Beauce	Henri Sévérin Béland	Liberal	1902	4th term
Beauharnois	Louis-Joseph Papineau	Conservative	1908 (Note: First elected as a Liberal)	2nd term
Bellechasse	Joseph Octave Lavallée	Conservative	1911	1st term
Berthier	Joseph Arthur Barrette	Conservative	1911	1st term
Bonaventure	Charles Marcil	Liberal	1900	4th term
Brome	George Harold Baker	Conservative	1911	1st term
Chambly—Verchères	Joseph Hormisdas Rainville	Conservative	1911	1st term
Champlain	**Pierre Édouard Blondin** (until 20 October 1914 ministerial appointment)	Conservative	1908	2nd term
Champlain	**Pierre Édouard Blondin** (by-election of 7 November 1914)	Conservative	1908	2nd term
Charlevoix	Joseph David Rodolphe Forget	Conservative	1904	3rd term
Chicoutimi—Saguenay	Joseph Girard	Independent Conservative	1900	4th term
Châteauguay	James Pollock Brown (died 30 May 1913)	Liberal	1891	6th term
Châteauguay	James Morris (by-election of 11 October 1913)	Conservative	1913	1st term
Compton	Frederick Robert Cromwell	Conservative	1911	1st term
Dorchester	**Albert Sévigny** (until 8 January 1917 ministerial appointment) (†)	Conservative	1911	1st term
Dorchester	**Albert Sévigny** (by-election of 27 January 1917) (†)	Conservative	1911	1st term
Drummond—Arthabaska	Joseph Ovide Brouillard	Liberal	1911	1st term
Gaspé	Louis-Philippe Gauthier	Conservative	1911	1st term
Hochelaga	**Louis Coderre** (until 29 October 1912 Secretary of State appointment)	Conservative	1911	1st term
Hochelaga	**Louis Coderre** (by-election of 19 November 1912, until 6 October 1915 judicial appointment)	Conservative	1911	1st term
Hochelaga	Esioff-Léon Patenaude (by-election of 15 October 1915)	Conservative	1915	1st term
Huntingdon	James Alexander Robb	Liberal	1908	2nd term
Jacques Cartier	**Frederick Debartzch Monk** (until 10 October 1911 ministerial appointment)	Conservative	1896	5th term
Jacques Cartier	**Frederick Debartzch Monk** (by-election of 27 October 1911, resigned 2 March 1914)	Conservative	1896	5th term
Jacques Cartier	Joseph Adélard Descarries (by-election of 1 February 1915)	Conservative	1915	1st term
Joliette	Joseph Pierre Octave Guilbault	Conservative	1911	1st term
Kamouraska	Ernest Lapointe	Liberal	1904	4th term
Labelle	Honoré Achim	Conservative	1911	1st term
Labelle	Honoré Achim	Liberal	1911	1st term
Laprairie—Napierville	Roch Lanctôt	Liberal	1904	3rd term
L'Assomption	Paul-Arthur Séguin	Liberal	1908	2nd term
Laval	Charles Avila Wilson	Liberal	1908	2nd term
Lévis	Joseph Boutin Bourassa	Liberal	1911	1st term
L'Islet	Eugène Paquet	Conservative	1904	3rd term
Lotbinière	Edmond Fortier	Liberal	1900	5th term
Maisonneuve	Alphonse Verville	Labour	1906	3rd term
Maskinongé	Adélard Bellemare	Independent Conservative	1911	1st term
Mégantic	Lucien Turcotte Pacaud	Liberal	1911	1st term
Missisquoi	William Frederic Kay	Liberal	1911	1st term
Montcalm	David Arthur Lafortune	Liberal	1909	2nd term
Montmagny	David Ovide L'Espérance	Conservative	1911	1st term
Montmorency	Joseph David Rodolphe Forget	Conservative	1904	3rd term
Nicolet	Paul-Émile Lamarche	Conservative	1911	1st term
Pontiac	Gerald Hugh Brabazon	Conservative	1904, 1911	2nd term*
Portneuf	Michel-Siméon Delisle	Liberal	1900	4th term
Quebec-Centre	Arthur Lachance	Liberal	1905	3rd term
Quebec County	**Louis-Philippe Pelletier** (until 10 October 1911 Postmaster General appointment)	Conservative	1911	1st term
Quebec County	**Louis-Philippe Pelletier** (by-election of 27 October 1911, resigned 20 October 1914)	Conservative	1911	1st term
Quebec County	Thomas Chase Casgrain (by-election of 7 November 1914)	Conservative	1914	1st term
Quebec East	Wilfrid Laurier	Liberal	1874	10th term
Quebec West	William Power	Liberal	1902, 1911	3rd term*
Richelieu	Arthur Cardin (until election voided 29 April 1912)	Liberal	1911	1st term
Richelieu	Arthur Cardin (by-election of 24 October 1912)	Liberal	1911	1st term
Richmond—Wolfe	Edmund William Tobin	Liberal	1900	4th term
Rimouski	Herménégilde Boulay	Conservative	1911	1st term
Rouville	Rodolphe Lemieux	Liberal	1896	5th term
St. Anne	**Charles Joseph Doherty** (until 10 October 1911)	Conservative	1908	2nd term
St. Anne	**Charles Joseph Doherty** (by-election of 27 October 1911)	Conservative	1908	2nd term
St. Antoine	Herbert Brown Ames	Conservative	1904	3rd term
St. Hyacinthe	Louis Joseph Gauthier	Liberal	1911	1st term
St. James	Louis Audet Lapointe	Liberal	1911	1st term
St. Johns—Iberville	Marie Joseph Demers	Liberal	1906	3rd term
St. Lawrence	Robert Bickerdike	Liberal	1900	4th term
St. Mary	Médéric Martin	Liberal	1908	2nd term
Shefford	Georges Henri Boivin	Liberal	1911	1st term
Town of Sherbrooke	Francis N. McCrea	Liberal	1911	1st term
Soulanges	Wilfrid Laurier	Liberal	1874	10th term
Stanstead	Charles Henry Lovell	Liberal	1907	3rd term
Témiscouata	Charles Arthur Gauvreau	Liberal	1897	5th term
Terrebonne	**Wilfrid Bruno Nantel** (until 10 October 1911 ministerial appointment)	Conservative	1908	2nd term
Terrebonne	**Wilfrid Bruno Nantel** (by-election of 27 October 1911, until 20 October 1914 railway appointment)	Conservative	1908	2nd term
Terrebonne	Gédéon Rochon (by-election of 8 February 1915)	Conservative	1915	1st term
Three Rivers and St. Maurice	Jacques Bureau	Liberal	1900	4th term
Two Mountains	Joseph Arthur Calixte Éthier	Liberal	1896	5th term
Vaudreuil	Gustave Benjamin Boyer	Liberal	1904	3rd term
Wright	Emmanuel Berchmans Devlin	Liberal	1904	3rd term
Yamaska	Albéric Archie Mondou	Conservative	1911	1st term

=== Saskatchewan ===
Electoral district	Name	Party	First elected/previously elected	No. of terms
Assiniboia	John Gillanders Turriff	Liberal	1904	3rd term
Battleford	Albert Champagne	Liberal	1908	2nd term
Humboldt	David Bradley Neely	Liberal	1908	2nd term
Mackenzie	Edward L. Cash	Liberal	1904	3rd term
Moose Jaw	William Erskine Knowles	Liberal	1908	2nd term
Prince Albert	James McKay (until 16 December 1914 judicial appointment)	Conservative	1911	1st term
Prince Albert	Samuel James Donaldson (by-election of 1 February 1915)	Conservative	1915	1st term
Qu'Appelle	Levi Thomson	Liberal	1911	1st term
Regina	William Melville Martin	Liberal	1908	2nd term
Saltcoats	Thomas MacNutt	Liberal	1908	2nd term
Saskatoon	George Ewan McCraney	Liberal	1908	2nd term

=== Yukon ===
Electoral district	Name	Party	First elected/previously elected	No. of terms
Yukon	Alfred Thompson	Conservative	1904, 1911	2nd term*

== By-elections ==
By-election	Date	Incumbent	Party	Winner	Party	Cause	Retained
Dorchester	January 27, 1917	Albert Sévigny	Conservative	Albert Sévigny	Conservative	Recontested upon appointment as Minister of Inland Revenue	Yes
Toronto East	December 14, 1916	Albert Edward Kemp	Conservative	Albert Edward Kemp	Conservative	Recontested upon appointment as Minister of Militia and Defence	Yes
Hochelaga	October 15, 1915	Louis Coderre	Conservative	Esioff-Léon Patenaude	Conservative	Appointed a judge of the Superior Court of Quebec	Yes
Terrebonne	February 8, 1915	Wilfrid Bruno Nantel	Conservative	Gédéon Rochon	Conservative	Appointed a Railway Commissioner	Yes
Westmorland	February 1, 1915	Henry Emmerson	Liberal	Arthur Bliss Copp	Liberal	Death	Yes
Jacques Cartier	February 1, 1915	Frederick D. Monk	Conservative	Joseph Adélard DesCarries	Conservative	Resignation (ill health)	Yes
Prince Albert	February 1, 1915	James McKay	Conservative	Samuel James Donaldson	Conservative	Appointed a judge of the Supreme Court of Saskatchewan	Yes
London	February 1, 1915	Thomas Beattie	Conservative	William Gray	Conservative	Death	Yes
Waterloo South	February 1, 1915	George Adam Clare	Conservative	Frank Stewart Scott	Conservative	Death	Yes
Champlain	November 7, 1914	Pierre Édouard Blondin	Conservative	Pierre Édouard Blondin	Conservative	Recontested upon appointment as Minister of Inland Revenue	Yes
Quebec County	November 7, 1914	Louis-Philippe Pelletier	Conservative	Thomas Chase-Casgrain	Conservative	Resignation prior to being appointed a judge	Yes
York	December 31, 1913	Oswald Smith Crocket	Conservative	Harry Fulton McLeod	Conservative	Appointed a judge of the Supreme Court of New Brunswick	Yes
Lanark South	December 13, 1913	John Graham Haggart	Conservative	Adelbert Edward Hanna	Conservative	Death	Yes
Macdonald	December 13, 1913	Alexander Morrison	Conservative	Alexander Morrison	Conservative	Election declared void	Yes
Bruce South	October 30, 1913	James J. Donnelly	Conservative	Reuben Eldridge Truax	Liberal	Called to the Senate	No
Middlesex East	October 21, 1913	Peter Elson	Conservative	Samuel Francis Glass	Conservative	Death	Yes
Châteauguay	October 11, 1913	James Pollock Brown	Liberal	James Morris	Conservative	Death	No
Portage la Prairie	July 19, 1913	Arthur Meighen	Conservative	Arthur Meighen	Conservative	Recontested upon appointment as Solicitor General	Yes
Hochelaga	November 19, 1912	Louis Coderre	Conservative	Louis Coderre	Conservative	Recontested upon appointment as Secretary of State for Canada	Yes
Carleton	October 30, 1912	Edward Kidd	Conservative	William Foster Garland	Conservative	Death	Yes
Richelieu	October 24, 1912	Arthur Cardin	Liberal	Arthur Cardin	Liberal	Election declared void	Yes
Macdonald	October 12, 1912	William D. Staples	Conservative	Alexander Morrison	Conservative	Appointed Grain Commissioner for Canada	Yes
Simcoe South	June 10, 1912	Haughton Lennox	Conservative	William Alves Boys	Conservative	Appointed a judge	Yes
Kootenay	May 30, 1912	Arthur Samuel Goodeve	Conservative	Robert Francis Green	Conservative	Appointed a Railway Commissioner	Yes
Renfrew South	February 22, 1912	Thomas Andrew Low	Liberal	George Perry Graham	Liberal	Resignation	Yes
Nipissing	November 8, 1911	George Gordon	Conservative	Francis Cochrane	Conservative	Called to the Senate	Yes
Leeds	November 6, 1911	George Taylor	Conservative	William Thomas White	Conservative	Called to the Senate	Yes
Yale—Cariboo	November 4, 1911	Martin Burrell	Conservative	Martin Burrell	Conservative	Recontested upon appointment as Minister of Agriculture	Yes
Halifax	October 27, 1911	Robert Borden	Conservative	Robert Borden	Conservative	Recontested upon appointment as Prime Minister	Yes
Elgin West	October 27, 1911	Thomas Wilson Crothers	Conservative	Thomas Wilson Crothers	Conservative	Recontested upon appointment as Minister of Labour	Yes
St. Anne	October 27, 1911	Charles Doherty	Conservative	Charles Doherty	Conservative	Recontested upon appointment as Minister of Justice	Yes
Toronto North	October 27, 1911	George Eulas Foster	Conservative	George Eulas Foster	Conservative	Recontested upon appointment as Minister of Trade and Commerce	Yes
City and County of St. John	October 27, 1911	John Waterhouse Daniel	Conservative	John Douglas Hazen	Conservative	Resignation to provide a seat for Hazen	Yes
Victoria	October 27, 1911	Sam Hughes	Liberal-Conservative	Sam Hughes	Liberal-Conservative	Recontested upon appointment as Minister of Militia and Defence	Yes
Jacques Cartier	October 27, 1911	Frederick Debartzch Monk	Conservative	Frederick Debartzch Monk	Conservative	Recontested upon appointment as Minister of Public Works	Yes
Terrebonne	October 27, 1911	Wilfrid Bruno Nantel	Conservative	Wilfrid Bruno Nantel	Conservative	Recontested upon appointment as Minister of Inland Revenue	Yes
Quebec County	October 27, 1911	Louis-Philippe Pelletier	Conservative	Louis-Philippe Pelletier	Conservative	Recontested upon appointment as Postmaster-General	Yes
Grenville	October 27, 1911	John Dowsley Reid	Conservative	John Dowsley Reid	Conservative	Recontested upon appointment as Minister of Customs	Yes
Marquette	October 27, 1911	William James Roche	Conservative	William James Roche	Conservative	Recontested upon appointment as Secretary of State for Canada	Yes
Winnipeg	October 27, 1911	Alexander Haggart	Conservative	Robert Rogers	Conservative	Resignation to provide a seat for Rogers	Yes
