= 9th Canadian Ministry =

Government cabinet of Canada (1911–1917)

9th Canadian Ministry 9e conseil des ministres du Canada
- 9th ministry of Canada

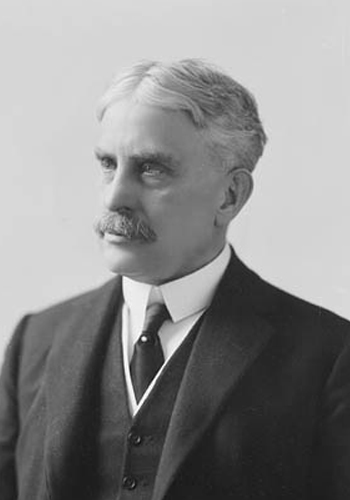
- Date formed: 10 October 1911
- Date dissolved: 11 October 1917

People and organizations
- Monarch: George V
- Governor General: Earl Grey; Duke of Connaught; Duke of Devonshire
- Prime Minister: Robert Borden
- Member party: Conservative
- Status in legislature: Majority
- Opposition party: Liberal
- Opposition leader: Wilfrid Laurier

History
- Election: 1911
- Legislature term: 12th Canadian Parliament
- Predecessor: 8th Canadian Ministry
- Successor: 10th Canadian Ministry

The Ninth Canadian Ministry was the first cabinet chaired by Prime Minister Sir Robert Borden. It governed Canada from 10 October 1911 to 12 October 1917, including only the 12th Canadian Parliament. The government was formed by the old Conservative Party of Canada. The Conservatives governed in coalition with the Liberal-Conservative Party until 12 October 1916 when the last Liberal-Conservative cabinet minister, Sam Hughes, was dismissed. Borden was also Prime Minister in the Tenth Canadian Ministry, which he formed for the coalition government with the Liberal–Unionists in the lead up to the 1917 Canadian federal election.

== Cabinet ==
- Prime Minister
  - 10 October 1911 – 12 October 1917: Sir Robert Borden
- Minister of Agriculture
  - 10 October 1911 – 16 October 1911: Vacant (George Finley O'Halloran was acting)
  - 16 October 1911 – 12 October 1917: Martin Burrell
- Minister of Aviation
  - 31 October 1916 – 12 October 1917: Sir George Halsey Perley
- Minister of Customs
  - 10 October 1911 – 12 October 1917: John Dowsley Reid
- Secretary of State for External Affairs
  - 10 October 1911 – 1 April 1912: William James Roche
  - 1 April 1912 – 12 October 1917: Sir Robert Borden
- Minister of Finance
  - 10 October 1911 – 12 October 1917: Sir William Thomas White
- Receiver General of Canada
  - 10 October 1911 – 12 October 1917: The Minister of Finance (Ex officio)
    - 10 October 1911 – 12 October 1917: Sir William Thomas White
- Superintendent-General of Indian Affairs
  - 10 October 1911 – 12 October 1917: The Minister of the Interior (Ex officio)
  - 10 October 1911 – 29 October 1912: Robert Rogers
  - 29 October 1912 – 12 October 1917: William James Roche
- Minister of Inland Revenue
  - 10 October 1911 – 20 October 1914: Wilfrid Bruno Nantel
  - 20 October 1914 – 6 October 1915: Pierre-Édouard Blondin
  - 6 October 1915 – 8 January 1917: Esioff-Léon Patenaude
  - 8 January 1917 – 12 October 1917: Albert Sévigny
- Minister of the Interior
  - 10 October 1911 – 29 October 1912: Robert Rogers
  - 29 October 1912 – 12 October 1917: William James Roche
- Minister of Justice
  - 10 October 1911 – 12 October 1917: Charles Doherty
- Attorney General of Canada
  - 10 October 1911 – 12 October 1917: The Minister of Justice (Ex officio)
    - 10 October 1911 – 12 October 1917: Charles Doherty
- Minister of Labour
  - 10 October 1911 – 12 October 1917: Thomas Wilson Crothers
- Leader of the Government in the Senate
  - 10 October 1911 – 12 October 1917: Sir James Alexander Lougheed
- Minister of Marine and Fisheries
  - 10 October 1911 – 12 October 1917: John Douglas Hazen
- Minister of Militia and Defence
  - 10 October 1911 – 12 October 1916: Sir Sam Hughes
  - 12 October 1916 – 23 November 1916: Vacant (Eugène Fiset was acting)
  - 23 November 1916 – 12 October 1917: Sir Albert Edward Kemp
- Minister of Mines
  - 10 October 1911 – 30 March 1912: Wilfrid Bruno Nantel
  - 30 March 1912 – 29 October 1912: Robert Rogers
  - 29 October 1912 – 10 February 1913: William James Roche
  - 10 February 1913 – 6 October 1915: Louis Coderre
  - 6 October 1915 – 8 January 1917: Pierre-Édouard Blondin
  - 8 January 1917 – 13 June 1917: Esioff-Léon Patenaude
  - 13 June 1917 – 25 August 1917: Albert Sévigny (acting)
  - 25 August 1917 – 12 October 1917: Arthur Meighen
- Minister of the Naval Service
  - 10 October 1911 – 12 October 1917: John Douglas Hazen
- Minister of Overseas Military Forces
  - 31 October 1916 – 12 October 1917: Sir George Halsey Perley
- Postmaster General
  - 10 October 1911 – 20 October 1914: Louis-Philippe Pelletier
  - 20 October 1914 – 30 December 1916: Thomas Chase-Casgrain
  - 30 December 1916 – 8 January 1917: Vacant ( Robert Miller Coulter was acting)
  - 8 January 1917 – 12 October 1917: Pierre-Édouard Blondin
- President of the Privy Council
  - 10 October 1911 – 12 October 1917: Sir Robert Borden
- Minister of Public Works
  - 10 October 1911 – 29 October 1912: Frederick Debartzch Monk
  - 29 October 1912 – 23 August 1917: Robert Rogers
  - 23 August 1917 – 3 October 1917: Vacant (James Blake Hunter was acting)
  - 3 October 1917 – 12 October 1917: Charles Ballantyne
- Minister of Railways and Canals
  - 10 October 1911 – 12 October 1917: Francis Cochrane
- Secretary of State of Canada
  - 10 October 1911 – 29 October 1912: William James Roche
  - 29 October 1912 – 6 October 1915: Louis Coderre
  - 6 October 1915 – 8 January 1917: Pierre-Édouard Blondin
  - 8 January 1917 – 13 June 1917: Esioff-Léon Patenaude
  - 13 June 1917 – 25 August 1917: Albert Sévigny (acting)
  - 25 August 1917 – 12 October 1917: Arthur Meighen
- Registrar General of Canada
  - 10 October 1911 – 12 October 1917: The Secretary of State of Canada (Ex officio)
    - 10 October 1911 – 29 October 1912: William James Roche
    - 29 October 1912 – 6 October 1915: Louis Coderre
    - 6 October 1915 – 8 January 1917: Pierre-Édouard Blondin
    - 8 January 1917 – 13 June 1917: Esioff-Léon Patenaude
    - 13 June 1917 – 25 August 1917: Albert Sévigny (acting)
    - 25 August 1917 – 12 October 1917: Arthur Meighen
- Solicitor General of Canada
  - 2 October 1915 – 25 August 1917: Arthur Meighen
  - 25 August 1917 – 31 August 1917: Vacant
  - 31 August 1917 – 12 October 1917: Arthur Meighen (acting)
- Minister of Trade and Commerce
  - 10 October 1911 – 12 October 1917: Sir George Eulas Foster
- Minister without Portfolio
  - 10 October 1911 – 31 October 1916: Sir George Halsey Perley
  - 10 October 1911 – 23 November 1916: Sir Albert Edward Kemp
  - 10 October 1911 – 12 October 1917: Sir James Alexander Lougheed

== Offices not of the Cabinet ==
Parliamentary Undersecretary of State for External Affairs

- 15 July 1916 – 21 October 1916: Vacant
- 21 October 1916 – 12 October 1917: Hugh Clark

Parliamentary Secretary of Militia and Defence

- 15 July 1916 – 19 July 1916: Vacant
- 19 July 1916 – 12 October 1917: Fleming Blanchard McCurdy

Solicitor General of Canada

- 10 October 1911 – 26 June 1913: Vacant
- 26 June 1913 – 2 October 1915: Arthur Meighen
- 4 October 1917 – 12 October 1917: Hugh Guthrie

== Succession ==
Ministries of Canada
Preceded by 8th Canadian Ministry	9th Canadian Ministry; 1911–1917	Succeeded by 10th Canadian Ministry
