= Joseph-Théodule Rhéaume =

Canadian politician

Member of the Canadian Parliament for Jacques Cartier
- In office 1922–1930
- Preceded by: David Arthur Lafortune
- Succeeded by: Georges-Philippe Laurin

Member of the Legislative Assembly of Quebec for Jacques-Cartier
- In office 1933–1935
- Preceded by: Victor Marchand
- Succeeded by: Frederick Arthur Monk

Personal details
- Born: September 13, 1874 Montreal, Quebec, Canada
- Died: August 10, 1954 (aged 79) Montreal, Quebec, Canada
- Party: Liberal
- Other political affiliations: Quebec Liberal Party

Joseph-Théodule Rhéaume (September 13, 1874 – August 10, 1954) was a Quebec politician, lawyer and judge.

Rhéaume earned his law degree at Laval University at Montreal and was admitted to the bar in 1903 and became King's Counsel in 1914.

He was elected by acclamation as a Liberal to the House of Commons of Canada in the riding of Jacques Cartier in a 1922 by-election. He was re-elected in the 1925 and 1926 federal elections twice defeating Esioff-Léon Patenaude who was Conservative leader Arthur Meighen's Quebec lieutenant and Justice minister. However, Rhéaume lost his seat in the 1930 federal election.

Rhéaume moved to provincial politics and was elected by acclamation to the Legislative Assembly of Quebec as the Quebec Liberal Party MLA for Jacques-Cartier provincial electoral district in 1933. He did not run for re-election in the 1935 provincial election.

In 1936, he was appointed to the bench of the Quebec Superior Court for the district of Montreal.

== Electoral record ==
By-election on 20 November 1922
Party	Candidate	Votes
Liberal	Joseph-Théodule Rhéaume	acclaimed

1925 Canadian federal election: Jacques Cartier
Party	Candidate	Votes
Liberal	Joseph-Théodule Rhéaume	16,826
Conservative	Esioff-Léon Patenaude	14,956

1926 Canadian federal election: Jacques Cartier
Party	Candidate	Votes
Liberal	Joseph-Théodule Rhéaume	18,755
Conservative	Esioff-Léon Patenaude	16,602

1930 Canadian federal election: Jacques Cartier
Party	Candidate	Votes
Conservative	Georges-Philippe Laurin	22,907
Liberal	Joseph-Théodule Rhéaume	20,438
Independent Liberal	Wilfrid-Émile Ranger	981
Source: lop.parl.ca
