= Frederick Monk =

Frederick Monk may refer to:

- Frederick Arthur Monk (1884–1954), Quebec politician
- Frederick Debartzch Monk (1856–1914), Canadian lawyer and politician
- Fred Monk (1920–1987), English footballer and coach
