= Rodolphe Laflamme =

Canadian politician (1827–1893)

The Honourable Rodolphe Laflamme PC
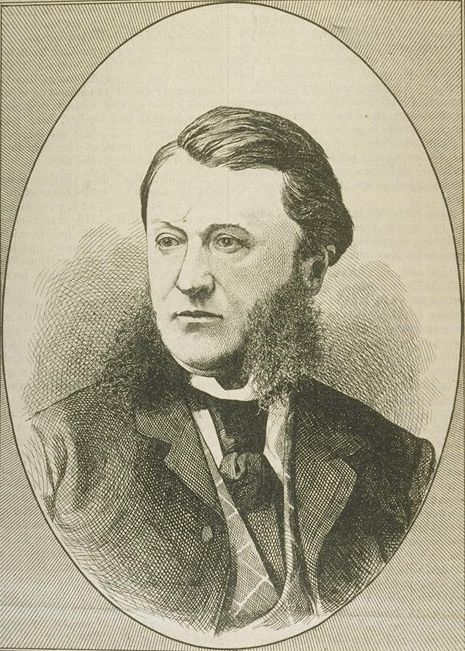

Member of the Canadian Parliament for Jacques Cartier
- In office 1872–1878
- Preceded by: Guillaume Gamelin Gaucher
- Succeeded by: Désiré Girouard

Personal details
- Born: Toussaint-Antoine-Rodolphe Laflamme; 15 May 1827 Montreal, Lower Canada
- Died: 7 December 1893 (aged 66) Montreal, Quebec
- Party: Liberal

Toussaint-Antoine-Rodolphe Laflamme, PC (15 May 1827 – 7 December 1893), was a French-Canadian lawyer, professor of law and politician. He received a BCL in 1856 and an honorary DCL in 1873, both from McGill University. He was a partner in a prominent Montreal, Quebec, law firm, and was known for his support of the Liberal party. He was from 1872 to 1878 a Member of Parliament in the House of Commons of Canada, and served as the Minister of Inland Revenue, and then the Minister of Justice in the administration of Alexander Mackenzie.

Laflamme was considered to be among the first group to be appointed to the Supreme Court of Canada, but it was decided his presence in parliament was necessary and he subsequently rejected the appointment.

== Family ==
His daughter Lady Jetté, married, in 1862, Sir Louis-Amable Jetté, K.C.M.G., a Justice of the Superior Court of Quebec, and Lieutenant-Governor of Quebec. She was born March 27, 1841, and educated in Montreal.

1872 Canadian federal election: Jacques Cartier
Party	Candidate	Votes
Liberal	Rodolphe Laflamme	685
Conservative	Désiré Girouard	635
Source: Canadian Elections Database

1874 Canadian federal election: Jacques Cartier
Party	Candidate	Votes
Liberal	Rodolphe Laflamme	acclaimed
Source: lop.parl.ca

By-election: On Mr. Laflamme being named Minister of Inland Revenue, 9 November 1876

By-election on 28 December 1876
Party	Candidate	Votes
Liberal	Rodolphe Laflamme	acclaimed

1878 Canadian federal election: Jacques Cartier
Party	Candidate	Votes
Conservative	Désiré Girouard	1,010
Liberal	Rodolphe Laflamme	1,008

1882 Canadian federal election: Jacques Cartier
Party	Candidate	Votes
Conservative	Désiré Girouard	994
Liberal	Rodolphe Laflamme	731

Political offices
Preceded by Felix Geoffrion	Minister of Inland Revenue; 1876–1877	Succeeded by Joseph-Édouard Cauchon
Preceded by Edward Blake	Minister of Justice; 1877–1878	Succeeded by James McDonald
