= David Wesley Bole =

Canadian politician (1856–1933)

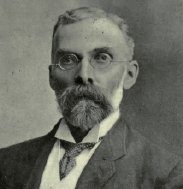

Member of Parliament for Winnipeg
- In office January 11, 1905 – September 17, 1908
- Preceded by: Arthur Puttee
- Succeeded by: Alexander Haggart

Personal details
- Born: February 15, 1856 Watford, Canada West
- Died: June 24, 1933 (aged 77) Winnipeg, Manitoba, Canada
- Party: Liberal
- Spouse: Isabella Lennox
- Occupation: Pharmacist, wholesaler

David Wesley Bole (February 15, 1856 – June 24, 1933) was a Canadian pharmacist, businessman, and politician.

Born in Watford, Warwick Township in Lambton County, Canada West, the eldest son of Irish immigrants, James and Anne Bole, Bole was educated in Watford Public School and at Woodstock College. He worked as an editor of a Watford newspaper before studying pharmacy. He graduated from the Ontario College of Pharmacy in 1880. He married Isabella Lennox and moved to Regina in 1882 where he opened a drug store. In 1885, he moved to Winnipeg and founded the Bole Drug Company Limited in 1898.

He was an alderman on the Winnipeg City Council and President of the Board of Trade of Winnipeg. For several years he was a member, and three years Chairman of the Winnipeg School Board. He was first elected to the House of Commons of Canada for the electoral district of Winnipeg in the general elections held in 1904. A Liberal, he did not run in the 1908 election.

He helped found the drug wholesaler company National Drug and Chemical Company of Canada (now McKesson Canada) in 1905 and was its first president. He retired in 1922. He died in Winnipeg in 1933 of a stroke.

Bole Street in Winnipeg is named in his honor.
