= Hugh McKay Sutherland =

Canadian politician

Member of the Canadian Parliament for Selkirk
- In office 1882–1887
- Preceded by: Thomas Scott
- Succeeded by: Thomas Mayne Daly

Personal details
- Born: February 22, 1845 New London, Prince Edward Island
- Died: August 14, 1926 (aged 81) Croydon (London), England
- Party: Liberal

Hugh McKay Sutherland (February 22, 1845 – August 14, 1926) was a lumber merchant and political figure in Manitoba, Canada. He represented Selkirk in the House of Commons of Canada from 1882 to 1887 as a Liberal member.

He was born in New London, Prince Edward Island, the son of Donald Sutherland, a Scottish immigrant. Sutherland moved to Oxford County, Canada West with his family in 1849. He taught school there for a time. Sutherland then worked as a bookkeeper for Adam Oliver's lumber business at Ingersoll. He married Mary Dickie in 1864. From 1868 to 1873, he was involved in the lumber trade near Orillia, first in partnership with Oliver and later on his own. In 1873, he moved to the North West region where he served as superintendent of Dominion Government Public Works. He married May Banks in 1878 after the death of his first wife in 1875. Sutherland settled at Winnipeg where he again became involved in the lumber trade. In 1875, he was an unsuccessful candidate for a seat in the Ontario legislative assembly. Sutherland ran unsuccessfully in the federal riding of Winnipeg in 1887. He was president of the Winnipeg and Hudson's Bay Railway, the Rainy Lake Lumber Company, the Canadian Northern Coal and Ore Dock Company, the British and North-West Colonization Company and the Prince Albert Colonization Company and vice-president of the Manitoba South Western Railway. In 1921, Sutherland married Constance Margaret Denholm. He died in Croydon, England at the age of 83 and was buried in Winnipeg.
