= Doug Finley =

Canadian politician

The Honourable Doug Finley

Canadian Senator from Ontario
- In office August 27, 2009 – May 11, 2013
- Nominated by: Stephen Harper
- Appointed by: Michaëlle Jean

Personal details
- Born: Michael Douglas Finley; July 25, 1946 Exeter, England, United Kingdom
- Died: May 11, 2013 (aged 66) Ottawa, Ontario, Canada
- Party: Scottish National Party; Conservative
- Spouse: Diane Finley

Michael Douglas Finley (July 25, 1946 – May 11, 2013) was a Canadian Senator and was Campaign Director for the Conservative Party of Canada during the 2006 and 2008 federal elections and the party's director of Political Operations.

== Biography ==
Finley was born in Exeter, England, and later raised in Hamilton, Scotland. In his professional life, Finley worked for Rolls-Royce Canada in Montreal, where he rose to the position of Director of Production, Strategic Planning and New Business Development. He then served as President of Standard Aero Corporation and Senior Vice President of Avcorp Industries. Later in his business career he worked as General Manager and Chief Operating Officer of Fernlea Flowers, of Delhi, Ontario.

Douglas Finley was described as Prime Minister Stephen Harper's "number two man" and an "attack dog", responsible for vetting and disciplining candidates and MPs. Prior to his involvement with Canadian federal politics, Finley was involved with the Scottish National Party. His first Canadian federal political involvement was in the 1974 campaign of Liberal candidate Rod Blaker, who was campaigning for re-election in the Quebec riding of Lachine. He later was involved with the former Reform and Canadian Alliance parties, predecessor parties to the Conservative Party of Canada.

Finley was married to cabinet minister Diane Finley, his second wife, for more than 30 years.

While working as Campaign Director for the Conservative Party of Canada during the 2006 federal election, Finley, with his colleagues Irving Gerstein, Michael Donison and Susan Kehoe, was involved in what became known as the In and Out scandal, in relation to campaign funding.

In 2009, Finley was appointed to the Senate.

Finley died of cancer on May 11, 2013.
