= Jacques Cartier (electoral district) =

Former federal electoral district in Quebec, Canada

Quebec electoral district

Defunct federal electoral district
- Legislature: House of Commons
- District created: 1867
- District abolished: 1952
- First contested: 1867
- Last contested: 1949 by-election

Jacques Cartier (French pronunciation: [ʒak kaʁtje]) was a federal electoral district in Quebec, Canada, that was represented in the House of Commons of Canada from 1867 to 1953.

It was created by the British North America Act, 1867. It was amalgamated into the Jacques-Cartier—Lasalle electoral district in 1952.

== Members of Parliament ==
This riding elected the following members of Parliament:

Parliament	Years	Member	Party
Jacques Cartier
1st	1867–1872	Guillaume Gamelin Gaucher	Conservative
2nd	1872–1874	Rodolphe Laflamme	Liberal
3rd	1874–1876	Rodolphe Laflamme	Liberal
3rd	1876–1878	Rodolphe Laflamme	Liberal
4th	1878–1882	Désiré Girouard	Conservative
5th	1882–1887	Désiré Girouard	Conservative
6th	1887–1891	Désiré Girouard	Conservative
7th	1891–1895	Désiré Girouard	Conservative
7th	1895–1896	Napoléon Charbonneau	Liberal
8th	1896–1900	Frederick Debartzch Monk	Conservative
9th	1900–1904	Frederick Debartzch Monk	Conservative
10th	1904–1908	Frederick Debartzch Monk	Conservative
11th	1908–1911	Frederick Debartzch Monk	Conservative
12th	1911–1911	Frederick Debartzch Monk	Conservative
12th	1911–1914	Frederick Debartzch Monk	Conservative
12th	1915–1917	Joseph Adélard Descarries	Conservative
13th	1917–1921	David Arthur Lafortune	Opposition (Laurier Liberals)
14th	1921–1922	David Arthur Lafortune	Liberal
14th	1922–1925	Joseph-Théodule Rhéaume	Liberal
15th	1925–1926	Joseph-Théodule Rhéaume	Liberal
16th	1926–1930	Joseph-Théodule Rhéaume	Liberal
17th	1930–1935	Georges-Philippe Laurin	Conservative
18th	1935–1939	Vital Mallette	Liberal
18th	1939–1940	Elphège Marier	Liberal
19th	1940–1945	Elphège Marier	Liberal
20th	1945–1949	Elphège Marier	Liberal
21st	1949–1949	Elphège Marier	Liberal
21st	1949–1953	Edgar Leduc	Independent
Riding dissolved into Jacques-Cartier—Lasalle

== Election results ==
1867 Canadian federal election
Party	Candidate	Votes
Conservative	Guillaume Gamelin Gaucher	659
Unknown	M. Brunet	542
Eligible voters		2,350
Source: Canadian Parliamentary Guide, 1871

1872 Canadian federal election
Party	Candidate	Votes
Liberal	Rodolphe Laflamme	685
Conservative	Désiré Girouard	635
Source: Canadian Elections Database

1874 Canadian federal election
Party	Candidate	Votes
Liberal	Rodolphe Laflamme	acclaimed
Source: lop.parl.ca

By-election: On Mr. Laflamme being named Minister of Inland Revenue, 9 November 1876

By-election on 28 December 1876
Party	Candidate	Votes
Liberal	Rodolphe Laflamme	acclaimed

1878 Canadian federal election
Party	Candidate	Votes
Conservative	Désiré Girouard	1,010
Liberal	Rodolphe Laflamme	1,008

1882 Canadian federal election
Party	Candidate	Votes
Conservative	Désiré Girouard	994
Liberal	Rodolphe Laflamme	731

1887 Canadian federal election
Party	Candidate	Votes
Conservative	Désiré Girouard	1,161
Liberal	Napoléon Charbonneau	965

1891 Canadian federal election
Party	Candidate	Votes
Conservative	Désiré Girouard	1,379
Liberal	J. A. C. Madore	1,103

By-election: On Mr. Girouard being named Judge of the Supreme Court of Canada, 28 September 1895

By-election on 30 November 1895
Party	Candidate	Votes
Liberal	Napoléon Charbonneau	acclaimed

1896 Canadian federal election
Party	Candidate	Votes
Conservative	Frederick Debartzch Monk	2,329
Liberal	Arthur Boyer	2,216

1900 Canadian federal election
Party	Candidate	Votes
Conservative	Frederick Debartzch Monk	2,682
Liberal	Jérémie L. Décarie	2,390

1904 Canadian federal election
Party	Candidate	Votes
Conservative	Frederick Debartzch Monk	3,095
Liberal	Louis A. Boyer	2,755

1908 Canadian federal election
Party	Candidate	Votes	%	±%
Conservative	Frederick Debartzch Monk	4,143	56.65	+3.75
Liberal	Ucal Henri Dandurand	3,170	34.34	-3.75
Total valid votes		7,313		
Conservative hold		Swing		+3.75

1911 Canadian federal election
Party	Candidate	Votes	%	±%
Conservative	Frederick Debartzch Monk	5,782	56.55	-0.10
Liberal	Louis-Joseph-Charles-Émile Boyer	4,442	43.45	+0.10
Total valid votes		10,224		
Conservative hold		Swing		-0.10

Canadian federal by-election, October 27, 1911 On Mr. Monk being appointed Minister of Public Works, 10 October 1911
Party	Candidate	Votes
Conservative	Frederick Debartzch Monk	acclaimed

Canadian federal by-election, February 1, 1915 On Mr. Monk's resignation, 2 March 1914
Party	Candidate	Votes
Conservative	Joseph Adélard Descarries	acclaimed

1917 Canadian federal election
Party	Candidate	Votes	%	±%
Opposition (Laurier Liberals)	David Arthur Lafortune	9,228	57.16	+13.71
Government (Unionist)	Aquila Jasmin	6,917	42.84	-13.71
Total valid votes		16,145		
Opposition (Laurier Liberals) gain from Conservative		Swing		+13.71

1921 Canadian federal election
Party	Candidate	Votes	%	±%
Liberal	David Arthur Lafortune	18,881	63.08	+5.92
Conservative	Jean-Baptiste Hercule Gohier	9,227	30.83	-12.02
Independent	Joseph Adélard Descarries	1,825	6.10	
Total valid votes		29,933		
Liberal hold		Swing		+8.97

1917 Canadian federal election
Party	Candidate	Votes	%	±%
Opposition (Laurier Liberals)	David Arthur Lafortune	9,228	57.16	+13.71
Government (Unionist)	Aquila Jasmin	6,917	42.84	-13.71
Total valid votes		16,145		
Opposition (Laurier Liberals) gain from Conservative		Swing		+13.71

1921 Canadian federal election
Party	Candidate	Votes	%	±%
Liberal	David Arthur Lafortune	18,881	63.08	+5.92
Conservative	Jean-Baptiste Hercule Gohier	9,227	30.83	-12.02
Independent	Joseph Adélard Descarries	1,825	6.10	
Total valid votes		29,933		
Liberal hold		Swing		+8.97

Canadian federal by-election, November 20, 1922 On Mr. Lafortune's death, 19 October 1922
Party	Candidate	Votes
Liberal	Joseph-Théodule Rhéaume	acclaimed

1925 Canadian federal election
Party	Candidate	Votes
Liberal	Joseph-Théodule Rhéaume	16,826
Conservative	Esioff-Léon Patenaude	14,956

1926 Canadian federal election
Party	Candidate	Votes
Liberal	Joseph-Théodule Rhéaume	18,755
Conservative	Esioff-Léon Patenaude	16,602

1930 Canadian federal election
Party	Candidate	Votes
Conservative	Georges-Philippe Laurin	22,907
Liberal	Joseph-Théodule Rhéaume	20,438
Independent Liberal	Wilfrid-Émile Ranger	981
Source: lop.parl.ca

1935 Canadian federal election
Party	Candidate	Votes
Liberal	Vital Mallette	7,309
Conservative	Georges-Philippe Laurin	6,796
Reconstruction	Alfred Drolet	1,872

By-election: On Mr. Mallette's death, 17 April 1939

By-election on 18 December 1939
Party	Candidate	Votes
Liberal	Elphège Marier	6,829
Independent Liberal	Albert Lacombe	1,418
Parti nationaliste	Edgar Guérard	558

1940 Canadian federal election
Party	Candidate	Votes
Liberal	Elphège Marier	11,755
National Government	Charles-Stanislas-Victorien Barre	4,028

1945 Canadian federal election
Party	Candidate	Votes
Liberal	Elphège Marier	12,640
Progressive Conservative	Elmo-Ernest Deslauriers	8,421
Bloc populaire	Victor Paul	3,147
Co-operative Commonwealth	Fabien Charron	1,866

1949 Canadian federal election
Party	Candidate	Votes
Liberal	Elphège Marier	15,298
Progressive Conservative	Leonard Arthur Seton	7,794
Co-operative Commonwealth	Fabien Charron	2,007

By-election: On Mr. Marier's acceptance of an office of emolument under the Crown, 24 August 1949

By-election on 1949/10/04
Party	Candidate	Votes
Independent	Edgar Leduc	9,327
Liberal	Sarto Marchand	6,903

== See also ==
- List of Canadian electoral districts
- Historical federal electoral districts of Canada
