= Raymond Rock =

Canadian politician

- Official 1968 portrait

Member of Parliament for Lachine (Jacques-Cartier—Lasalle; 1962–1968)
- In office June 18, 1962 – October 30, 1972
- Preceded by: Robert John Pratt
- Succeeded by: Rod Blaker

Personal details
- Born: October 1, 1922 Lachine, Quebec, Canada
- Died: January 22, 2016 (aged 93) Lancaster, Ontario, Canada
- Party: Liberal (?–1972); Progressive Conservative
- Spouse(s): Theresa Kudla (m. Aug 28, 1948 – Jul 26, 2012; her death)

Raymond Rock (October 1, 1922 – January 22, 2016) was a Canadian politician and a businessman. He was elected as the member of Parliament for the Liberal Party representing the riding of Jacques-Cartier—Lasalle in the 1962 federal election and later represented the riding of Lachine. Rock physically crossed the floor in 1972 to join the Progressive Conservatives and was subsequently defeated in the 1972 election. Rock crossed the floor because he had received a communique from the Liberal Party that no anglophones in Quebec should be employed by the Federal Government, no matter how bilingual. He also sat on various standing committees. Rock was a member of the Royal Canadian Naval Volunteer Reserve in which he served on HMCS Portage between 1942 and 1945. A businessman and owner of a hardware store, he also served as alderman in Lachine, Quebec (1951–55 and 1957–63) as well as President of the Lachine Chamber of Commerce. He died in January 2016 at the age of 93.

Rock's parents, John Rock and Helena Pietzik were both of Polish descent. With his wife, Theresa Kudla, he had two children, Allan Eric Rock (1952–2010) and Kenneth Lester Rock (1956–2009).
