= Borden ministry =

The Borden ministry could refer to one of two cabinets led by Robert Borden, the 8th Prime Minister of Canada:

- 9th Canadian Ministry, Conservative Party cabinet from 1911 to 1917
- 10th Canadian Ministry, Unionist Party cabinet from 1917 to 1920
