= Désiré Girouard =

Canadian judge and politician

The Honourable Désiré Girouard
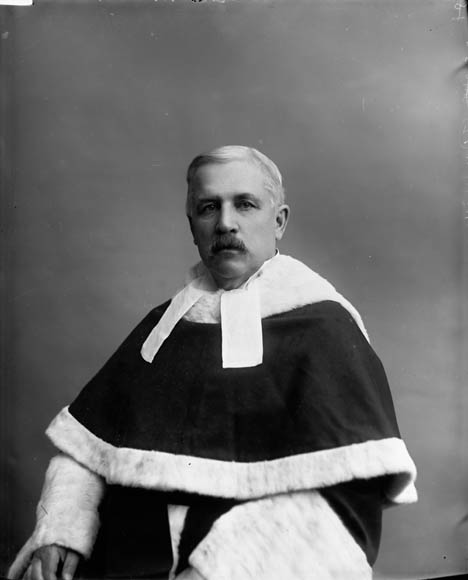

Puisne Justice of the Supreme Court of Canada
- In office September 28, 1895 – March 22, 1911
- Nominated by: Mackenzie Bowell
- Preceded by: Télesphore Fournier
- Succeeded by: Louis-Philippe Brodeur

Member of the Canadian Parliament for Jacques Cartier
- In office 1879–1895
- Preceded by: Rodolphe Laflamme
- Succeeded by: Napoléon Charbonneau

Personal details
- Born: July 7, 1836 Saint-Timothée, Lower Canada
- Died: March 22, 1911 (aged 74) Ottawa, Ontario
- Party: Conservative
- Relations: Jean-Baptiste Prat (father-in-law)

Désiré Girouard (July 7, 1836 – March 22, 1911) was a Canadian lawyer, politician, and Puisne Justice of the Supreme Court of Canada.

== Early life ==
Born in Saint-Timothée, Lower Canada (now part of Salaberry-de-Valleyfield, Quebec), the son of Jérémie Girouard and Hyppolite Picard, he received his Bachelor of Civil Law from McGill University in 1860. He was called to the Quebec Bar in 1860 and practiced law.

== Political life ==
In 1872 and 1874 he ran unsuccessfully for the House of Commons of Canada in the riding of the Quebec electoral districts of Jacques Cartier and Beauharnois as a Conservative, losing both times. He was elected by two votes in the 1878 election in the riding of Jacques Cartier. He was subsequently re-elected in 1882, 1887 and 1891.

Girouard was an author and contributor to legal journals and had been critical of the Supreme Court during his time in Parliament.

In 1892, he became the first mayor of Dorval, Quebec.

== Justice of the Supreme Court of Canada ==
On September 28, 1895, Prime Minister Mackenzie Bowell appointed Girouard to the Supreme Court of Canada to fill the vacancy created when Justice Télésphore Fournier retired from the Court on September 12, 1895. Prior to his appointment, Girouard had not previously served as a judge and had declined appointments to lower courts, but was praised for his role in addressing the McGreevy-Langevin scandal in Parliament. Girouard served on the court until his death from injuries in a sleighing accident in Ottawa in 1911.

Historian Ian Bushnell describes Girouard as a creative justice, and was capable in considering the effect of social conditions in his decisions, rather than strictly adhering to precedent.

== Family life ==
He was entombed at the Notre Dame des Neiges Cemetery in Montreal.

Girouard Avenue in Notre-Dame-de-Grâce, Montreal, was named for him.

His son, Sir Édouard Percy Cranwill Girouard, was the governor of the East Africa Protectorate (Kenya).

== Electoral record ==
1872 Canadian federal election: Jacques Cartier
Party	Candidate	Votes
Liberal	Rodolphe Laflamme	685
Conservative	Désiré Girouard	635
Source: Canadian Elections Database

1878 Canadian federal election: Jacques Cartier
Party	Candidate	Votes
Conservative	Désiré Girouard	1,010
Liberal	Rodolphe Laflamme	1,008

1882 Canadian federal election: Jacques Cartier
Party	Candidate	Votes
Conservative	Désiré Girouard	994
Liberal	Rodolphe Laflamme	731

1887 Canadian federal election: Jacques Cartier
Party	Candidate	Votes
Conservative	Désiré Girouard	1,161
Liberal	Napoléon Charbonneau	965

1891 Canadian federal election: Jacques Cartier
Party	Candidate	Votes
Conservative	Désiré Girouard	1,379
Liberal	J. A. C. Madore	1,103
