= Quebec lieutenant =

Position in Canadian political parties

In Canadian politics, a Quebec lieutenant (/lɛfˈtɛnənt/) is a Quebec politician who is selected by the leader of a federal party to be the main advisor or spokesperson on issues specific to Quebec. This is particularly the case when the leader is an anglophone, though several francophone leaders have also had Quebec lieutenants. It is typically filled by a Member of Parliament or at least a current or former candidate for Parliament. The position is usually a well-known but often unofficial assignment, and has no official legal status.

== Notable Quebec lieutenants ==
Some past and current Quebec lieutenants include:

=== Liberal ===
Lieutenant	Riding	Took office	Left office	Leader
Wilfrid Laurier	Drummond—Arthabaska (before 1877); Quebec East (after 1877)	1874	1887	Alexander Mackenzie; Edward Blake
None		1887	1896	Wilfrid Laurier
Joseph-Israël Tarte	St. Johns—Iberville (before 1900); Sainte-Marie (after 1900)	1896	1902	Wilfrid Laurier
None		1902	1921	Wilfrid Laurier; Daniel Duncan McKenzie (interim); William Lyon Mackenzie King
Ernest Lapointe	Quebec East	1921	1941	William Lyon Mackenzie King
Louis Saint-Laurent	Quebec East	1941	1948	William Lyon Mackenzie King
None		1948	1963	Louis Saint-Laurent; Lester B. Pearson
Guy Favreau	Papineau	1963	1967	Lester B. Pearson
Jean Marchand	Quebec West (before 1968); Langelier (after 1968)	1967	1975	Lester B. Pearson; Pierre Trudeau
Marc Lalonde	Outremont	1975	1984	Pierre Trudeau
Raymond Garneau	Laval-des-Rapides	1984	1988	John Turner
None		1988	1993	John Turner; Herb Gray (interim)
Marcel Massé	Hull—Aylmer	1993	1999	Jean Chrétien
Alfonso Gagliano	Saint-Léonard—Saint-Michel	1999	2002	Jean Chrétien
Martin Cauchon	Outremont	2002	2003	Jean Chrétien
Jean Lapierre	Outremont	2003	2006	Paul Martin
None		2006	2007	Bill Graham (interim); Stéphane Dion
Marcel Proulx	Hull—Aylmer	2007	2007	Stéphane Dion
Céline Hervieux-Payette	None (Note: Hervieux-Payette represented the senatorial division of Bedford.)	2007	2008	Stéphane Dion
Denis Coderre	Bourassa	2009	2009	Michael Ignatieff
Rémi Bujold (as Chief Provincial Organizer); Marc Garneau (as Leader's Representative) (Note: Position split into two: leaders' representative/advisor and chief provincial organizer.)	None (Bujold); Westmount—Ville-Marie (Garneau)	2009	2011	Michael Ignatieff
None		2011	2019	Bob Rae (interim); Justin Trudeau
Pablo Rodriguez	Honoré-Mercier	2019	2024	Justin Trudeau
Jean-Yves Duclos	Québec	2024	2025	Justin Trudeau
Steven Guilbeault	Laurier—Sainte-Marie	2025	2025	Mark Carney
Joël Lightbound	Louis-Hébert	2025	Present	Mark Carney

=== Conservative (1867–1942) ===
Lieutenant	Riding	Took office	Left office	Leader
George-Étienne Cartier	Montreal East	1867	1873	John A. Macdonald
Hector Langevin	Dorchester (before 1876); Charlevoix (1876–1878); Trois-Rivières (after 1878)	1873	1891	John A. Macdonald
Joseph-Aldric Ouimet	Laval	1891	1896	John Abbott; John Sparrow David Thompson; Mackenzie Bowell; Charles Tupper
None		1896	1911	Charles Tupper; Robert Borden
Frederick Debartzch Monk	Jacques-Cartier	1911	1914	Robert Borden
Pierre-Édouard Blondin	Champlain	1914	1921	Robert Borden
None		1921	1925	Arthur Meighen
Esioff-Léon Patenaude	None (Note: Patenaude ran in Jacques-Cartier in 1925 and 1926 and was defeated both times.)	1925	1926	Arthur Meighen
None		1926	1942	Hugh Guthrie (interim); R. B. Bennett; Robert Manion; Richard Hanson (interim); Arthur Meighen

=== Progressive Conservative ===
Lieutenant	District (Area)	Took office	Left office	Leader
None		1942	1949	John Bracken; George A. Drew
Georges-Henri Héon	Argenteuil	1949	1949	George A. Drew
None		1949	1957	George A. Drew; William Earl Rowe; John Diefenbaker
Léon Balcer	Trois-Rivières	1957	1965	John Diefenbaker
None		1965	1967	John Diefenbaker
Marcel Faribault	None (Note: Faribault ran in Gamelin in 1968 and was defeated.)	1967	1968	Robert Stanfield
None		1968	1972	Robert Stanfield
Claude Wagner	Saint-Hyacinthe	1972	1978	Robert Stanfield; Joe Clark
None		1978	1988	Joe Clark; Erik Nielsen (interim); Brian Mulroney
Lucien Bouchard	Lac-Saint-Jean	1988	1990	Brian Mulroney
Benoît Bouchard	Roberval	1990	1993	Brian Mulroney
Monique Landry	Blainville—Deux-Montagnes	1993	1993	Kim Campbell
None		1993	1998	Jean Charest; Elsie Wayne (interim)
André Bachand	Richmond—Arthabaska	1998	2004	Joe Clark; Peter MacKay

=== Canadian Alliance ===
Lieutenant	Riding	Took office	Left office	Leader
Gérard Latulippe	None (Note: Latulippe ran in Charlesbourg—Jacques Cartier in 2000 and was defeated.)	2000	2000	Stockwell Day

=== Conservative (2004–present) ===
Lieutenant	Riding	Took office	Left office	Leader
Josée Verner	None (Note: Verner ran in Louis-Saint-Laurent in 2004 and was defeated. She would later be elected to represent the riding in 2006.)	2004	2005	Stephen Harper
Lawrence Cannon	Pontiac	2005	2008	Stephen Harper
Christian Paradis	Mégantic—L'Érable	2008	2013	Stephen Harper
Denis Lebel	Roberval—Lac-Saint-Jean (before 2015); Lac-Saint-Jean (after 2015)	2013	2017	Stephen Harper; Rona Ambrose (interim)
Alain Rayes	Richmond—Arthabaska	2017	2020	Andrew Scheer; Erin O'Toole
Richard Martel	Chicoutimi—Le Fjord	2020	2021	Erin O'Toole
Alain Rayes	Richmond—Arthabaska	2021	2022	Erin O'Toole; Candice Bergen (interim)
Luc Berthold	Mégantic—L'Érable	2022	2022	Candice Bergen (interim)
Pierre Paul-Hus	Charlesbourg—Haute-Saint-Charles	2022	Present	Pierre Poilievre

=== Social Credit ===
Lieutenant	Riding	Took office	Left office	Leader
Réal Caouette	Villeneuve	1961	1963 (Note: In 1963 the Quebec wing of the party split into the Ralliement des créditistes under Caouette's leadership.)	Robert N. Thompson

=== New Democratic ===
Lieutenant	Riding	Took office	Left office	Leader
Gérard Picard	None (Note: Picard ran in Montreal—Mercier in 1963 and lost.)	1961	1963	Tommy Douglas
Robert Cliche	None (Note: Cliche ran in Beauce in 1965 and Duvernay in 1968 and was defeated both times.)	1964	1968	Tommy Douglas
None		1968	1989	Tommy Douglas; David Lewis; Ed Broadbent
Claude Rompré	None (Note: Rompré ran in Saint-Maurice in 1986 and 1988 and was defeated both times.)	1989	1990	Ed Broadbent; Audrey McLaughlin
None		1990	2003	Audrey McLaughlin; Alexa McDonough
Pierre Ducasse	None (Note: Ducasse ran in Manicouagan in 2004 and 2006 and Hull—Aylmer in 2008 and was defeated each time. He had also been associate president of the party since 2001 and ran in its 2003 leadership election, in which Layton was elected.)	2003	2007 (Note: Ducasse continued to serve as Layton's Quebec special advisor following Mulcair's appointment.)	Jack Layton
Tom Mulcair	Outremont	2007	2012	Jack Layton; Nycole Turmel (interim)
Alexandre Boulerice	Rosemont—La Petite-Patrie	2012	2026	Tom Mulcair; Jagmeet Singh; Don Davies (interim)
