= Anatole Carignan =

Canadian politician (1885–1952)

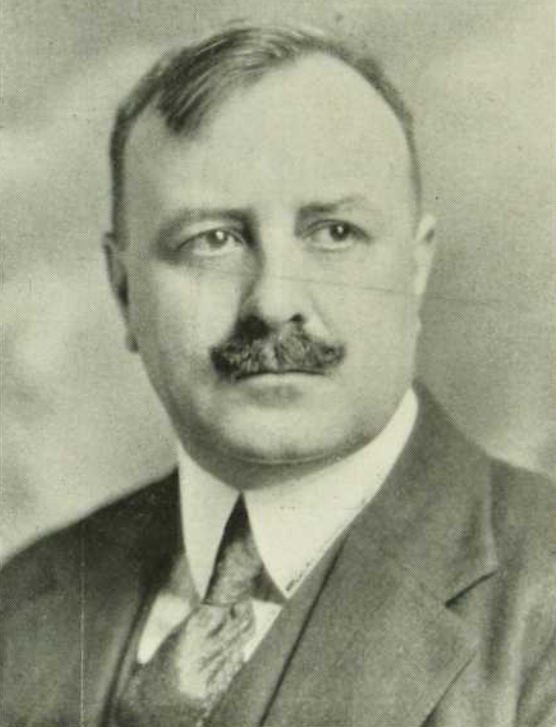

Member of the Legislative Assembly of Quebec for Jacques-Cartier
- In office 1936–1939
- Preceded by: Frederick Arthur Monk
- Succeeded by: Charles-Aimé Kirkland

Personal details
- Born: July 7, 1885 Parish of Saints-Anges-de-Lachine, Quebec
- Died: July 30, 1952 (aged 67) Montreal, Quebec
- Party: Union Nationale

Anatole Carignan (French pronunciation: [anatɔl kaʁiɲɑ̃]; July 7, 1885 – July 30, 1952) was a Canadian politician.

== Biography ==
Born in the parish of Saints-Anges-de-Lachine, Quebec, Carignan was educated at the Commercial College of Lachine. He worked for the Banque d'Épargne and the Bank of Hochelaga from 1902 to 1910. From 1910 to 1952, he was the Manager of the Industrial Company of Lachine.

Carignan was a member of the Municipal Council of LaSalle from 1915 to 1921 and was mayor from 1921 to 1925. He was the defeated Conservative candidate for the Legislative Assembly of Quebec for Jacques-Cartier in a 1925 by-election and again in the 1927 general elections. He was mayor of Lachine from 1933 to 1939 and again from 1944 to 1952. He was elected to the Legislative Assembly of Quebec for Jacques-Cartier in 1936 as the Union Nationale candidate. He was Minister of Highways from 1938 to 1939. He was defeated in the 1939 elections and again in 1944.

From 1947 to 1952, he was the Curateur public of Quebec.

He died in Montreal in 1952.
