= Napoléon Charbonneau =

Canadian politician

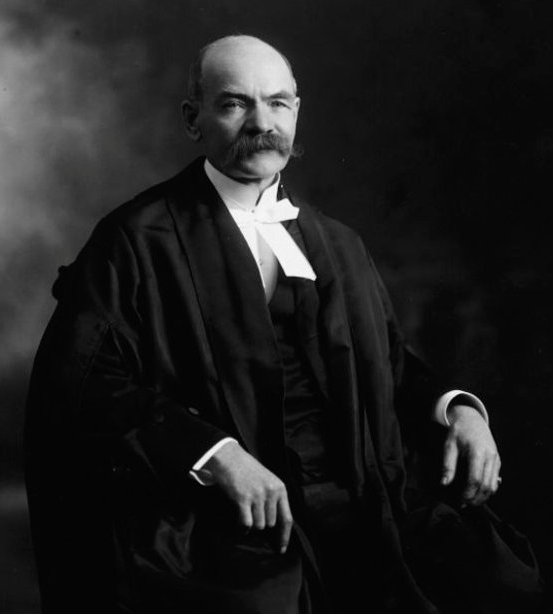

Member of the Canadian Parliament for Jacques Cartier
- In office 1895–1896
- Preceded by: Désiré Girouard
- Succeeded by: Frederick Debartzch Monk

Personal details
- Born: February 12, 1853 Côte-des-Neiges, Canada East
- Died: August 31, 1916 (aged 63)
- Party: Liberal

Napoléon Charbonneau (February 12, 1853 – August 31, 1916) was a Canadian lawyer, judge, and politician.

Born in Côte-des-Neiges, Canada East, the son of Augustin Charbonneau and Julienne Dufort, Charbonneau studied law in the office of Trudel and Taillon and was admitted to the bar in January 1879. He practiced civil and commercial law in Montreal and was in partnership for several years with Hormisdas Pelletier. He first ran as the Liberal candidate for the House of Commons of Canada for the riding of Jacques Cartier in the 1887 election but was defeated. He was elected in an 1895 by-election sitting about seven months and did not run in the 1896 election. In 1903 he was appointed a Puisne Judge of the Superior Court of the Province of Quebec.

1887 Canadian federal election: Jacques Cartier
Party	Candidate	Votes
Conservative	Désiré Girouard	1,161
Liberal	Napoléon Charbonneau	965

By-election on 30 November 1895
Party	Candidate	Votes
Liberal	Napoléon Charbonneau	acclaimed
