= Thomas Scott (Manitoba politician) =

Canadian politician (1841–1915)

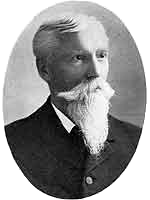
Thomas Scott

Thomas Scott (February 16, 1841 – February 11, 1915) was a Canadian military figure, Manitoba Member of the Legislative Assembly, Member of Parliament and the third Mayor of Winnipeg in the 19th century.

Scott was born in Lanark County, Ontario in what was then Upper Canada to Irish immigrant parents. He was the youngest of four children. His father died when he was an infant, and the family moved to Perth, Ontario where Scott attended school and then apprenticed as a printer. He founded the Perth Expositor newspaper in 1861 and was its editor and proprietor, until 1872.

In 1860, Scott signed up for military service, during the Trent Affair. He was in command of the Perth Infantry and served for five months on the frontier during the Fenian Raids crisis on 1866. During the Red River Expedition of 1870, Scott – by this time a colonel – was in command of the Ontario Rifles which arrived at Fort Garry following Louis Riel's escape. He returned to Ontario, in December 1870, but was sent again to Fort Garry, in 1871, as part of the Second Red River Expedition. In 1874, he retired from military service but remained in Manitoba where he entered politics and was elected to Winnipeg's first city council; he became mayor in 1877. In 1878, he was elected to the Manitoba legislature from the district of Winnipeg and, in 1880, he defeated incumbent Donald A. Smith to become the Conservative MP for Selkirk. He was re-elected in the 1882 federal election in the new riding of Winnipeg.

Scott returned to military service, in 1885, while still an MP, after the Minister of the Militia Sir Adolphe-Philippe Caron asked Scott to raise a regiment to put down the North-West Rebellion of 1885. Smith raised and equipped the Ninety-fifth Manitoba Grenadiers in thirteen days.

Scott retired from politics, in 1887, and became collector of customs at the port of Winnipeg.

Parliament of Canada
Preceded by Donald Alexander Smith	Member of Parliament from Selkirk; 1880–1882	Succeeded by Hugh McKay Sutherland
New district Created from part of Selkirk	Member of Parliament from Winnipeg; 1882–1887	Succeeded by William Bain Scarth
