= Vital Mallette =

Canadian politician

J. L. Vital Mallette

Member of Parliament for Jacques Cartier
- In office October 1935 – April 1939
- Preceded by: Georges-Philippe Laurin
- Succeeded by: Elphège Marier

Personal details
- Born: Joseph Léon Vital Mallette; 16 September 1888 Pointe-Claire, Quebec
- Died: 17 April 1939 (aged 50) Montreal, Quebec
- Party: Liberal
- Spouse(s): Aline Demers m. 10 August 1915
- Profession: miller, secretary-treasurer

Joseph-Léon-Vital Mallette (16 September 1888 – 17 April 1939) was a Liberal party member of the House of Commons of Canada. He was born in Pointe-Claire, Quebec and became a miller and secretary-treasurer.

Mallette was mayor of Pointe-Claire, Quebec from 1923 to 1927, after terms as a community alderman from 1915 to 1917 and from 1922 to 1923.

He was elected to Parliament at the Jacques Cartier riding in the 1935 general election. In 1937, Mallette spoke in the House of Commons of the representative politics that followed the Lower Canada Rebellion a century earlier, in which his grandfather was a Patriote. His speech carried an implied charge that Prime Minister William Lyon Mackenzie King had ignored the centennial of the rebellion.

Before he was able to complete his first term, the 18th Canadian Parliament, Mallette died on 17 April 1939 after he collapsed while crossing a Montreal street.
