= Elphège Marier =

Canadian politician

Member of Parliament for Jacques Cartier
- In office December 1939 – August 1949
- Preceded by: Vital Mallette
- Succeeded by: Edgar Leduc

Personal details
- Born: 31 July 1888 Drummondville, Quebec, Canada
- Died: 1 January 1978 (aged 89) Pointe-Claire, Quebec, Canada
- Party: Liberal
- Spouse(s): Ernestine Durocher m. 23 June 1913
- Profession: lawyer

Elphège Marier (31 July 1888 – 1 January 1978) was a Liberal party member of the House of Commons of Canada. He was born in Drummondville, Quebec and became a lawyer by career.

Marier was educated at Drummondville, at Nicolet Seminary then at the University of Montreal where he received his Bachelor of Arts and Doctor of Laws degrees. From 1918 to 1938 he served as recorder for Pointe-Claire, Quebec and participated in that community's school commission from 1931 to 1938.

He was first elected to Parliament at the Jacques Cartier riding in a by-election on 18 December 1939. Marier was re-elected there in 1940, 1945 and 1949. On 24 August 1949, Marier was appointed a judge of the Superior Court of Quebec and resigned from the House of Commons.
