= William Bain Scarth =

Canadian politician

Member of the Canadian Parliament for Winnipeg
- In office 1887–1891
- Preceded by: Thomas Scott
- Succeeded by: Hugh John Macdonald

Personal details
- Born: November 10, 1837 Aberdeen, Scotland
- Died: May 15, 1902 (aged 64) Ottawa, Ontario
- Party: Conservative

William Bain Scarth (November 10, 1837 – May 15, 1902) was a Scottish-born businessman and political figure in Ontario and Manitoba, Canada. He represented Winnipeg in the House of Commons of Canada from 1887 to 1891 as a Conservative member.

He was born in Aberdeen, the son of James Lendrum Scarth and Jane Geddes, was educated in Edinburgh and Aberdeen, and came to the Province of Canada in 1855. Scarth campaigned for Isaac Buchanan in Hamilton and then Adam Hope in London and then Toronto, also working as manager of the Toronto branch of Hope's hardware company. In 1869, he married Jessie Stuart Franklin Hamilton. He entered business on his own as a timber merchant and shipowner in 1871.

== Land speculation and investments ==
Scarth was also involved in real estate, mining and railways, and managed capital invested in Canada on behalf of British investors. Scarth served as a member of Toronto city council in 1879 and 1882. He was an unsuccessful candidate for a seat in the Manitoba assembly in 1886. Scarth founded North British Canadian Investment Company (1876) and The Scottish Ontario and Manitoba Land Company (1879) to speculate and develop land around Toronto and the then new province of Manitoba. The latter land company owned land around the original location of the Rosedale Golf Club, which he later used to develop into residential homes in North Rosedale. In 1882, he became managing director of the Canada North-West Land Company, which had purchased land grants in Manitoba formerly owned by the Canadian Pacific Railway; the CNWLC lobbied for his retirement from politics and Scarth was forced to support Hugh John Macdonald as federal candidate in 1891.

== Later life in politics and death ==
Scarth became federal deputy minister of agriculture in 1895 and remained in office until his death in Ottawa at the age of 64.

Scarth's Scottish Ontario and Manitoba Land Company lives on in a series of buildings at 664-680 Yonge Street in Toronto. They were completed in 1883 and now remains standing with stores on the ground floor with upper residential units.
