= Edgar Leduc =

Canadian politician

Mayor of Lachine, Quebec
- In office 1939–1944

Member of Parliament for Jacques Cartier
- In office October 1949 – August 1953
- Preceded by: Elphège Marier
- Succeeded by: riding dissolved

Member of Parliament for Jacques-Cartier—Lasalle
- In office August 1953 – June 1957
- Preceded by: riding created
- Succeeded by: Robert John Pratt

Personal details
- Born: 4 February 1888 Valleyfield, Quebec
- Died: 13 October 1973 (aged 85) Lachine, Quebec
- Party: Independent; Liberal
- Spouse(s): Maria Pilon (m. 6 September 1910)
- Profession: insurance broker

Edgar R. Leduc (February 4, 1888 – October 13, 1973) was a Canadian sportsman and politician. From 1907 to 1915 he played as a professional ice hockey left wing, including three seasons with the Montreal Canadiens from 1909 to 1912, as one of the original Montreal Canadiens players. He later worked as an insurance broker, and in 1918 became a local politician in Lachine, Quebec. In 1949 he was elected to the House of Commons of Canada, where he served until 1957.

== Hockey career ==
Edgar Leduc
- Height: 5 ft 5 in (165 cm)
- Weight: 150 lb (68 kg; 10 st 10 lb)
- Position: Left wing
- Shot: Left
- Playing career: 1907–1915

Born in Valleyfield, Quebec, Leduc first played senior level hockey for the Montreal Aiglons of the Montreal Hockey Association in 1907–08. In 1908–09, he played for the Montreal Le National, and played with their ill-fated team in the CHA in 1909–10. After the CHA folded, he joined the original Montreal Canadiens, known as 'Les Canadiens' for the season. He would play one further season with the Canadiens club in 1911–12. Leduc also played in senior leagues such as the Montreal City Senior Hockey League with Montreal Champêtre, finishing his career in 1914–15 with the Nationals.

=== Career statistics ===
MHA = Montreal Hockey Association, QIHA = Quebec Intermediate Hockey Association, MDHL = Montreal District Hockey League

			Regular Season					Playoffs
Season	Team	League	GP	G	A	Pts	PIM	GP	G	A	Pts	PIM
1907–08	Montreal Aiglons	MHA	--	--	--	--	--	--	--	--	--	--
1908–09	Montreal Aiglons	MHA	--	--	--	--	--	--	--	--	--	--
1908–09	Montreal Le National Seconds	QIHA	--	--	--	--	--	--	--	--	--	--
1908–09	Montreal Sutton	QIHA	--	--	--	--	--	--	--	--	--	--
1909–10	Montreal Le National	CHA	4	7	0	7	6	--	--	--	--	--
1909–10	Montreal Canadiens	NHA	3	3	0	3	0	--	--	--	--	--
1910–11	Montreal ACB	MMfHL	8	3	0	3	9	--	--	--	--	--
1910–11	Montreal Baillargeon	MCSHL	9	2	0	2	18	--	--	--	--	--
1911–12	Montreal Canadiens	NHA	4	0	0	0	0	--	--	--	--	--
1911–12	Montreal Champêtre	MCSHL	1	2	0	2	0	--	--	--	--	--
1912–13	Montreal Hochelaga	MCSHL	12	3	0	3	18	--	--	--	--	--
1912–13	Montreal Allis-Chambers	MDHL	9	4	0	4	0	--	--	--	--	--
1913–14	Montreal Hochelaga	MCSHL	10	5	0	5	0	--	--	--	--	--
1913–14	Montreal Allis-Chambers	MDHL	5	1	0	1	30	--	--	--	--	--
1914–15	Lachine Eagles	WCHL	1	0	0	0	0	--	--	--	--	--
1914–15	Montreal Le National	MCSHL	12	1	0	1	30	--	--	--	--	--
NHA Totals			7	3	0	3	0

== Political career ==
In 1918, Leduc became a municipal Secretary-Treasurer of Lachine, Quebec and remained in that position until 1923 when he began a ten-year term as an alderman of that community. He was then Lachine's Mayor from 1939 until 1944.

Leduc was first elected to Parliament at the Jacques Cartier riding as an independent candidate in a by-election on 4 October 1949, defeating Liberal candidate Sarto Marchand. He was re-elected as a Liberal party candidate in the 1953 federal election, when his riding was changed to Jacques-Cartier—Lasalle. After completing his only full term in the 22nd Canadian Parliament, Leduc was defeated in the 1957 election by Robert John Pratt of the Progressive Conservative party. Leduc made another unsuccessful attempt to unseat Pratt in the 1958 election.
