= Robert John Pratt =

Canadian politician (1907–2003)

Member of the Canadian Parliament for Jacques-Cartier—Lasalle
- In office 1957–1962
- Preceded by: Edgar Leduc
- Succeeded by: Raymond Rock

Personal details
- Born: 28 February 1907 London, England
- Died: 6 April 2003 (aged 96)
- Party: Progressive Conservative
- Spouse(s): Dorothy Ward m. 19 August 1935

Robert John Pratt (28 February 1907 – 6 April 2003) was an architect, comedian, and politician in Canada.

Pratt was born in London, England; his Irish mother lived in London and his father lived in Montreal. In 1933, he received a Bachelor of Architecture degree from McGill University and became a practicing architect. He enlisted with the Royal Canadian Hussars during World War II rising to the rank of major. In 1942, he joined the Royal Canadian Navy so he could be a part of the Royal Canadian Navy musical revue Meet the Navy and sung the song "You'll Get Used to It" (which he rewrote some of the lyrics). Pratt also performed for the 1946 film version Meet the Navy (film).

After the war, Pratt made a series of humorous short how-to films. In 1948, he performed in a musical version of The Drunkard which he took on tour. During the Korean War, he entertained the soldiers and later hosted a television program called This Is French. During Expo 67 he produced the World Festival of Performing Arts.

In 1953, he was elected as an alderman in the city of Dorval, Quebec. From 1955 to 1964, he was mayor of Dorval. He was elected to the House of Commons of Canada in the 1957 federal election in the riding Jacques-Cartier—Lasalle. A Progressive Conservative, he was re-elected in the 1958 election. He was defeated in 1962 and again in 1963, 1968, and 1974.
