= Jacques-Cartier—Lasalle =

Former federal electoral district in Quebec, Canada

Quebec electoral district

Defunct federal electoral district
- Legislature: House of Commons
- District created: 1952
- District abolished: 1966
- First contested: 1953
- Last contested: 1965

Jacques-Cartier—Lasalle was a federal electoral district in Quebec, Canada, that was represented in the House of Commons of Canada from 1953 to 1968.

This riding was created in 1952 from parts of Jacques Cartier and Verdun—La Salle ridings. It was abolished in 1966 when it was redistributed into Dollard, Lachine, Lasalle, Mount Royal, Notre-Dame-de-Grâce and Vaudreuil ridings.

== Members of Parliament ==
This riding elected the following members of Parliament:

Parliament	Years	Member	Party
Jacques-Cartier—Lasalle; Riding created from Jacques Cartier and Verdun—La Salle
22nd	1953–1957	Edgar Leduc	Liberal
23rd	1957–1958	Robert John Pratt	Progressive Conservative
24th	1958–1962	Robert John Pratt	Progressive Conservative
25th	1962–1963	Raymond Rock	Liberal
26th	1963–1965	Raymond Rock	Liberal
27th	1965–1968	Raymond Rock	Liberal
Riding dissolved into Dollard, Lachine, Lasalle, Mount Royal, Notre-Dame-de-Grâce and Vaudreuil

== Election results ==
1953 Canadian federal election
Party	Candidate	Votes
Liberal	Edgar Leduc	19,678
Progressive Conservative	John Stethem	9,208
Co-operative Commonwealth	Thérèse Casgrain	2,879
Independent PC	J.-Polydore Cardinal	840
Labor–Progressive	Ethel Leigh	493

1957 Canadian federal election
Party	Candidate	Votes
Progressive Conservative	Robert John Pratt	23,378
Liberal	Edgar Leduc	23,235
Co-operative Commonwealth	Gérard Labelle	1,939

1958 Canadian federal election
Party	Candidate	Votes
Progressive Conservative	Robert John Pratt	30,908
Liberal	Edgar Leduc	24,233
Co-operative Commonwealth	Thérèse Casgrain	3,364

1962 Canadian federal election
Party	Candidate	Votes
Liberal	Raymond Rock	34,232
Progressive Conservative	Robert John Pratt	27,883
New Democratic	J.-C. Tremblay	5,778
Social Credit	Henri Naud	1,758

1963 Canadian federal election
Party	Candidate	Votes
Liberal	Raymond Rock	44,299
Progressive Conservative	Robert John Pratt	20,260
New Democratic	Jean-Charles Tremblay	6,167
Social Credit	Jean-Gaston Rivard	4,637

1965 Canadian federal election
Party	Candidate	Votes
Liberal	Raymond Rock	44,251
Progressive Conservative	Frank G. Wayman	17,184
New Democratic	Maurice-J.-L. Daviau	13,853
Ralliement créditiste	Aurèle Parisien	2,956

== See also ==
- List of Canadian electoral districts
- Historical federal electoral districts of Canada
