= Georges-Philippe Laurin =

Canadian politician

Member of Parliament for Jacques Cartier
- In office July 1930 – October 1935
- Preceded by: Joseph-Théodule Rhéaume
- Succeeded by: Vital Mallette

Personal details
- Born: Joseph-Georges-Philippe Laurin; 9 July 1892 Montreal, Quebec, Canada
- Died: 6 October 1964 (aged 72)
- Party: Conservative
- Spouse(s): Annette Sauve m. 27 October 1920
- Profession: Notary

Joseph-Georges-Philippe Laurin (9 July 1892 – 6 October 1964) was a Conservative member of the House of Commons of Canada. He was born in Montreal, Quebec and became a notary.

Laurin attended Saint-Laurent College, then the Université de Montréal where he earned his Bachelor of Laws degree. He became a school commissioner of Saint-Laurent in 1927 and became president of that commission in July 1929. He was particularly interested in sports and was a member of the Canadian team to an international event at Nancy, France in 1911.

He was first elected to Parliament at the Jacques Cartier riding in the 1930 general election. After serving his only term, the 17th Canadian Parliament, Laurin was defeated by Vital Mallette of the Liberal party in the 1935 federal election.

== Electoral record ==
1930 Canadian federal election: Jacques Cartier
Party	Candidate	Votes
Conservative	Georges-Philippe Laurin	22,907
Liberal	Joseph-Théodule Rhéaume	20,438
Independent Liberal	Wilfrid-Émile Ranger	981
Source: lop.parl.ca

1935 Canadian federal election: Jacques Cartier
Party	Candidate	Votes
Liberal	Vital Mallette	7,309
Conservative	Georges-Philippe Laurin	6,796
Reconstruction	Alfred Drolet	1,872
