= Guillaume Gamelin Gaucher =

Canadian politician

Member of the Canadian Parliament for Jacques Cartier
- In office 1867–1872
- Preceded by: Institution created in 1867
- Succeeded by: Rodolphe Laflamme

Member of the Legislative Assembly of the Province of Canada for Jacques-Cartier
- In office 1864–1866
- Preceded by: François-Zéphirin Tassé
- Succeeded by: Institution abolished in 1866

Personal details
- Born: August 16, 1810 Sault-Saint-Louis (Kahnawake), Lower Canada
- Died: September 16, 1885 (aged 75) Sainte-Geneviève, Island of Montreal, Quebec
- Party: Conservative

Guillaume Gamelin Gaucher (August 16, 1810 – September 16, 1885) was a Quebecois businessman and political figure. He represented Jacques-Cartier in the 1st Canadian Parliament as a Conservative member.

He was born Jean-Guillaume Gaucher in Sault-Saint-Louis (later (Kahnawake) in 1810 and was educated there. He became a merchant at Sainte-Geneviève on the Island of Montreal. Gaucher served as a lieutenant-colonel in the local militia and was also a justice of the peace. He was mayor of the parish of Sainte-Geneviève in 1845 and again from 1859 to 1863 after it became a village. He was elected to the Legislative Assembly of the Province of Canada for Jacques-Cartier in an 1864 by-election; he was elected again after Confederation.

He died at Sainte-Geneviève in 1885.

1867 Canadian federal election: Jacques Cartier
Party	Candidate	Votes
Conservative	Guillaume Gamelin Gaucher	659
Unknown	M. Brunet	542
Eligible voters		2,350
Source: Canadian Parliamentary Guide, 1871
