= Lanark South (federal electoral district) =

Former federal electoral district in Ontario, Canada

Ontario electoral district

Defunct federal electoral district
- Legislature: House of Commons
- District created: 1867
- District abolished: 1914
- First contested: 1867
- Last contested: 1913 by-election

Lanark South was a federal electoral district represented in the House of Commons of Canada from 1867 to 1917. It was located in the province of Ontario. It was created by the British North America Act 1867 which divided the County of Lanark into two ridings: Lanark South and Lanark North.

In 1882, the South Riding of Lanark was defined as consisting of the townships of Bathurst, North Elmsley, Beckwith, South Sherbrooke, North Burgess, Drummond and Montague, the Town of Perth, and the Village of Carleton Place.

In 1903, the Town of Smiths Falls was added to the riding, and the Village of Carleton Place was excluded.

The electoral district was abolished in 1914 when it was merged into Lanark riding.

== Members of Parliament ==
This riding has elected the following members of Parliament:

Parliament	Years	Member	Party
1st	1867–1869	Alexander Morris	Conservative
1st	1869–1872	Alexander Morris	Conservative
2nd	1872–1874	John Graham Haggart	Conservative
3rd	1874–1878	John Graham Haggart	Conservative
4th	1878–1882	John Graham Haggart	Conservative
5th	1882–1887	John Graham Haggart	Conservative
6th	1887–1888	John Graham Haggart	Conservative
6th	1888–1891	John Graham Haggart	Conservative
7th	1891–1896	John Graham Haggart	Conservative
8th	1896–1900	John Graham Haggart	Conservative
9th	1900–1904	John Graham Haggart	Conservative
10th	1904–1908	John Graham Haggart	Conservative
11th	1904–1911	John Graham Haggart	Conservative
12th	1911–1913	John Graham Haggart	Conservative
12th	1913–1917	Adelbert Edward Hanna	Conservative
Riding dissolved into Lanark

== Election history ==
1867 Canadian federal election
Party	Candidate	Votes
Conservative	Alexander Morris	acclaimed

On Mr. Morris being named Minister of Inland Revenue, 16 November 1869:

By-election on 29 November 1869
Party	Candidate	Votes
Conservative	Alexander Morris	acclaimed

1872 Canadian federal election
Party	Candidate	Votes
Conservative	John Graham Haggart	1,318
Unknown	Mr. Bell	562

1874 Canadian federal election
Party	Candidate	Votes
Conservative	John Graham Haggart	1,318
Unknown	John Henry Gould	889

1878 Canadian federal election
Party	Candidate	Votes
Conservative	John Graham Haggart	1,585
Unknown	Francis Theodore Frost	1,261

1882 Canadian federal election
Party	Candidate	Votes
Conservative	John Graham Haggart	acclaimed

1887 Canadian federal election
Party	Candidate	Votes
Conservative	John Graham Haggart	1,762
Unknown	Duncan Kippen	880

On Mr. Haggart being named Postmaster General, 3 August 1888:

By-election on 15 August 1888
Party	Candidate	Votes
Conservative	John Graham Haggart	acclaimed

1891 Canadian federal election
Party	Candidate	Votes
Conservative	J. H. Haggart	1,804
Liberal	William McGarry	1,174

1896 Canadian federal election
Party	Candidate	Votes
Conservative	J. H. Haggart	1,939
McCarthyite	John Ferguson	1,560

1900 Canadian federal election
Party	Candidate	Votes
Conservative	Hon. John Haggart	2,010
Conservative	Richard F. Preston	1,626

1904 Canadian federal election
Party	Candidate	Votes
Conservative	John Graham Haggart	2,075
Liberal	Andrew W. Dwyer	1,185

1908 Canadian federal election
Party	Candidate	Votes
Conservative	Hon. John Graham Haggart	2,108
Liberal	George Fred McKimm	1,349

1911 Canadian federal election
Party	Candidate	Votes
Conservative	Hon. John Graham Haggart	2,234
Liberal	George Frederick McKimm	1,067

On Mr. Haggart's death, 13 March 1913:

By-election on 13 December 1913
Party	Candidate	Votes
Conservative	Adelbert Edward Hanna	1,907
Conservative	J. M. Balderson	1,773
Independent	Arthur Hawkes	65

== See also ==
- List of Canadian electoral districts
- Historical federal electoral districts of Canada
