= James Blake Hunter =

James Blake Hunter (August 31, 1876 – November 30, 1941 was a Canadian civil servant. He was Deputy Minister of Public Works from 1908 until his death, having served under 15 ministers.

Born in Waterloo, Hunter graduated from the University of Toronto in 1899 and joined the Dominion civil service. He became Assistant Deputy Minister, then Deputy Minister of Public Works in 1908. Among his achievements were the erection of many public buildings and the rapid relocation of Parliament to the Victoria Memorial Museum Building after its destruction in the 1916 fire.

The Hunter Building in Ottawa was named after him.
