= David Arthur Lafortune =

Canadian politician (1848–1922)

Member of the Canadian Parliament for Montcalm
- In office 1909–1917
- Preceded by: François Octave Dugas
- Succeeded by: District was abolished in 1914

Member of the Canadian Parliament for Jacques Cartier
- In office 1917–1922
- Preceded by: Joseph Adélard Descarries
- Succeeded by: Joseph-Théodule Rhéaume

Personal details
- Born: October 4, 1848 St-Esprit, Canada East
- Died: October 19, 1922 (aged 74)
- Party: Liberal

David Arthur Lafortune (October 4, 1848 – October 19, 1922) was a lawyer and political figure in Quebec. He represented Montcalm from 1909 to 1917 and Jacques Cartier from 1917 to 1922 in the House of Commons of Canada as a Liberal.

He was born in Saint-Ésprit, Canada East, the son of Joachim Lafortune and Félicité Beaupré, and was educated at the Collège de L'Assomption and the Université Laval. Lafortune was married twice: to Mary Hedwige Messier in 1874 and to Christina-Corinne Lussier in 1898. He was called to the Quebec bar in 1883. He ran unsuccessfully for a seat in the Quebec assembly in 1886 and 1904. Lafortune was appointed Crown Prosecutor for Montreal in 1905. In 1906, he was named King's Counsel. Lafortune was first elected to the House of Commons in a 1909 by-election held after François Octave Dugas was named a judge. He died in office in Montreal at the age of 74.

1911 Canadian federal election: Montcalm
Party	Candidate	Votes	%	±%
Liberal	David Arthur Lafortune	1,432	51.0	+5.3
Conservative	Joseph-Eugène-Edmond Marion	1,374	49.0	
Total valid votes		2,806	100.0	

Canadian federal by-election, 25 September 1909
Party	Candidate	Votes	%	±%
On Mr. Dugas being appointed Judge of the Quebec Superior Court, 6 September 1909
Independent Liberal	David Arthur Lafortune	1,256	54.3	
Liberal	Omer Lapierre	1,058	45.7	-7.6
Total valid votes		2,314	100.0	
