= Joseph Adélard Descarries =

Canadian politician

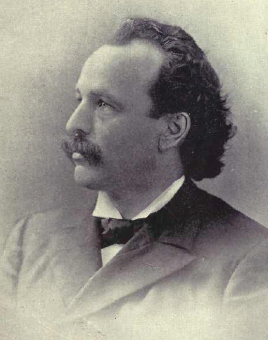

Member of the Canadian Parliament for Jacques Cartier
- In office 1915–1921
- Preceded by: Frederick Debartzch Monk
- Succeeded by: David Arthur Lafortune

Member of the Legislative Assembly of Quebec for Jacques-Cartier
- In office 1892–1897
- Preceded by: Arthur Boyer
- Succeeded by: Joseph-Adolphe Chauret

Personal details
- Born: November 7, 1853 Saint-Timothée, Canada East
- Died: July 25, 1927 (aged 73) Lachine, Quebec
- Party: Conservative

Joseph Adélard Descarries, KC (November 7, 1853 – July 25, 1927) was a French Canadian lawyer and politician.

Descarries was born in Saint-Timothée, Canada East, and educated at McGill University and Université Laval in Montreal. He studied law with Alexandre Lacoste, was called to the Quebec Bar in 1879 and was created a Queen's Counsel in 1903.

From 1897 to 1906, he was mayor of Lachine, Quebec. In 1882, 1883, and 1884, he ran unsuccessfully for the Legislative Assembly of Quebec. He was elected as a Conservative candidate in 1892 in the riding of Jacques-Cartier. He resigned in 1895 and was defeated in 1895 by-election in the federal riding of Jacques Cartier. He was elected in a 1915 by-election as the Conservative candidate and did not run for reelection in 1917. He ran unsuccessfully as an Independent candidate in the 1921 federal election.

In 1881, he married Célina-Elmire Le Pailleur. Descarries died in Lachine at the age of 73.

He was the father of the composer Auguste Descarries.

By-election: On Frederick Debartzch Monk's resignation, 2 March 1914

By-election on 1 February 1915
Party	Candidate	Votes
Conservative	Joseph Adélard Descarries	acclaimed
