= Frederick Arthur Monk =

Canadian politician (1884–1954)

Member of the Legislative Assembly of Quebec for Jacques-Cartier
- In office 1935–1936
- Preceded by: Joseph-Théodule Rhéaume
- Succeeded by: Anatole Carignan

Personal details
- Born: July 16, 1884 Montreal, Quebec
- Died: February 16, 1954 (aged 69) Montreal, Quebec
- Resting place: Mount Royal Cemetery
- Party: Action libérale nationale
- Spouse: Mabel Kathleen Whitley
- Relations: Frederick Debartzch Monk, father

Frederick Arthur Monk (July 16, 1884 – February 16, 1954) was a Quebec politician in Canada.

== Background ==
He was born in Montreal on July 16, 1884 and was the son of Frederick Debartzch Monk.

== Member of the legislature ==
He was elected as the Action libérale nationale (ALN) candidate to the Legislative Assembly of Quebec in 1935 for the district of Jacques-Cartier. He refused to join the newly formed Union Nationale and ran as an independent candidate in 1936, but was defeated.

== Death ==
He died on February 16, 1954.
