= Roderick Blaker =

Canadian politician (born 1936)

Roderick "Rod" Blaker (born 23 November 1936 in Montreal, Quebec) was a Liberal Party of Canada member of the House of Commons.

== Biography ==
Before entering politics, Blaker was a lawyer and broadcast editorialist. He was first elected in the electoral district of Lachine in the 1972 federal election and was re-elected in 1974, in 1979, and in 1980. He served consecutive terms in the 29th to the 32nd Parliaments and retired before the 1984 federal election.

During his time in Parliament, Blaker served as a Parliamentary Secretary to the Minister of Supply and Services from 1976 to 1977, the Solicitor General of Canada from 1977 to 1978 and the Minister for International Trade in 1984. He was also the Assistant Deputy Speaker of the House of Commons from 1980 to 1984 and the Deputy Chair of the Committee of the Whole from 1982 to 1984.

Blaker's 1974 election campaign was later noted for being the involvement of Doug Finley's first federal campaign. Finley later became a major election strategist for the Conservative Party of Canada, and was appointed to the Senate.
