= Lachine (electoral district) =

Former federal electoral district in Quebec, Canada

Quebec electoral district

Defunct federal electoral district
- Legislature: House of Commons
- District created: 1966
- District abolished: 1987
- First contested: 1968
- Last contested: 1984

Lachine (formerly known as Lachine—Lakeshore) was a federal electoral district in Quebec, Canada, that was represented in the House of Commons of Canada from 1968 to 1988.

This riding was created in 1966 from Jacques-Cartier—Lasalle riding. It initially consisted of the cities of Dorval, Lachine, and Pointe-Claire and the Town of Ile-Dorval.

The riding's name was changed to "Lachine—Lakeshore" in 1973. Lachine—Lakeshore was abolished in 1976, and a new Lachine riding was created. The new riding consisted of the Cities of Beaconsfield, Dorval, and Pointe-Claire; the town of Ile-Dorval; and the western part of the city of Lachine.

Lachine riding was abolished in 1987 when it was merged into Lachine—Lac-Saint-Louis.

== Members of Parliament ==
This riding elected the following members of Parliament:

Parliament	Years	Member	Party
Lachine; Riding created from Jacques-Cartier—Lasalle
28th	1968–1972	Raymond Rock	Liberal
28th	1972–1972	Raymond Rock	Progressive Conservative
29th	1972–1974	Roderick Blaker	Liberal
Lachine—Lakeshore
30th	1974–1979	Roderick Blaker	Liberal
Lachine
31st	1979–1980	Roderick Blaker	Liberal
32nd	1980–1984	Roderick Blaker	Liberal
33rd	1984–1988	Robert Layton	Progressive Conservative
Riding dissolved into Lachine—Lac-Saint-Louis

== Election results ==
=== Lachine, 1968–1974 ===
1968 Canadian federal election
Party	Candidate	Votes
Liberal	Raymond Rock	25,989
New Democratic	Laurier LaPierre	7,898
Progressive Conservative	Sarto Desnoyers	6,225
Ralliement créditiste	Jean Villeneuve	220

1972 Canadian federal election
Party	Candidate	Votes
Liberal	Roderick Blaker	26,680
Progressive Conservative	Raymond Rock	11,344
New Democratic	Lloyd Wood	4,221
Social Credit	Victor Di Battista	3,597

=== Lachine—Lakeshore, 1974–1979 ===
1974 Canadian federal election
Party	Candidate	Votes
Liberal	Roderick Blaker	22,068
Progressive Conservative	John Pratt	13,550
New Democratic	Lloyd Wood	3,571
Social Credit	Victor Di Battista	1,710
Independent	Frank E. Armitage	330
Marxist–Leninist	Richard Pringle	181

=== Lachine, 1979–1988 ===
1979 Canadian federal election
Party	Candidate	Votes
Liberal	Roderick Blaker	29,846
Progressive Conservative	Peter Blaikie	13,428
New Democratic	Buff Norman	2,450
Social Credit	C. Simons Gordon	801
Rhinoceros	Georges Raby	398
Libertarian	James E. Bobyn	85
Union populaire	Carmen Dion	84
Marxist–Leninist	Pierre-Jean Lafleur	59

1980 Canadian federal election
Party	Candidate	Votes
Liberal	Roderick Blaker	25,502
Progressive Conservative	Peter Blaikie	12,854
New Democratic	Buff Norman	3,492
Rhinoceros	Jean Serge Baribeau	692
Libertarian	David Bonet	106
Marxist–Leninist	Jean Létourneau	43

1984 Canadian federal election
Party	Candidate	Votes
Progressive Conservative	Robert Layton	24,301
Liberal	Stan Roberts	15,156
New Democratic	John J. P. Terauds	5,628
Rhinoceros	Scott Howarth	966
Parti nationaliste	Yves Ménard	503
Libertarian	Richard K. Kendall	245
Independent	David C. Fillmore	134
Independent	Stuart MacLellan	116

== See also ==
- List of Canadian electoral districts
- Historical federal electoral districts of Canada
