= William D. Staples =

Canadian politician

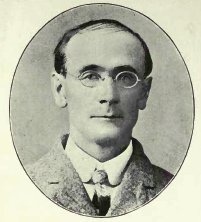

Member of the Canada Parliament for Macdonald
- In office January 11, 1905 – April 9, 1912
- Preceded by: Nathaniel Boyd
- Succeeded by: Alexander Morrison

Personal details
- Born: November 10, 1868 Fleetwood, in the Township of Manvers, Ontario, Canada
- Died: April 21, 1929 (aged 60) Elm Creek, Manitoba, Canada
- Party: Conservative

William D. Staples (November 10, 1868 – April 21, 1929) was a Canadian farmer, politician, and office holder.

Born in Fleetwood, in the Township of Manvers, Ontario, Staples was educated at the Public School of Fleetwood, the High School of Lindsay and the Winnipeg Collegiate Institute. He held a 2nd class Teacher's certificate and was a farmer. He was twelve years in the Municipal Council as Councillor and Reeve of Treherne, Manitoba. He was elected to the House of Commons of Canada for Macdonald in the 1904 federal election. A Conservative, he was re-elected in 1908 and 1911. He resigned his seat in 1912 when he was appointed a Grain Commissioner for Canada.
