= Adelbert Edward Hanna =

Canadian politician

Adelbert Edward Hanna (May 29, 1863 – February 27, 1918) was a physician and political figure in Ontario, Canada. He represented Lanark South from 1913 to 1917 as a Conservative and Lanark from 1917 to 1918 as a Unionist Party member.

He was born in Harlem, Canada West, the son of James K. Hanna and Jane Gallagher, and was educated in Athens, at McGill University and the University of Edinburgh. He practised medicine in Perth. Hanna was surgeon for the Canadian Pacific Railway. In 1895, he married Bessie Scott. Hanna was first elected to the House of Commons in a 1913 by-election held after the death of John Graham Haggart. He died in office in Westmount, Quebec at the age of 54.
