= John Graham Haggart =

Canadian politician (1836–1913)

The Honourable John Graham Haggart PC
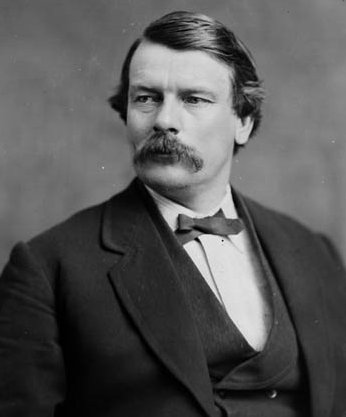
- Haggart in 1873

Member of the Canadian Parliament for Lanark South
- In office 1872–1913
- Preceded by: Alexander Morris
- Succeeded by: Adelbert Edward Hanna

Personal details
- Born: November 14, 1836 Perth, Upper Canada
- Died: March 13, 1913 (aged 76) Ottawa, Ontario, Canada
- Party: Conservative

John Graham Haggart PC (November 14, 1836 – March 13, 1913) was a Canadian politician.

Haggart served as a Member of Parliament from 1872 to 1913. This forty-year period of service in the Commons is the second-longest in Canadian history, exceeded only by Wilfrid Laurier, whose period of service (1874-1919) mostly overlaps with Haggart's. He was appointed as Postmaster General, serving in the cabinets of John A. Macdonald and John Abbott until 1892, when he switched portfolios, serving as Minister of Railways and Canals until the defeat of the Conservative government in 1896.

Prior to being elected to the House of Commons, Haggart was elected Mayor of Perth, Ontario three times: in 1867, 1869 and 1871.

There is a John Haggart fonds at Library and Archives Canada.
