= Albert Sévigny =

Canadian politician

The Honourable Albert Sévigny PC
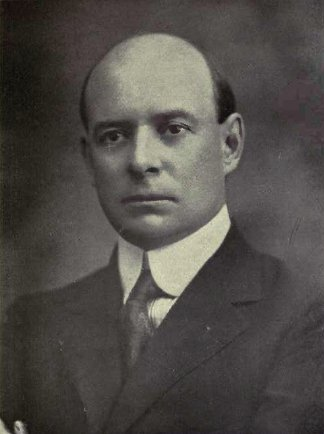

14th Speaker of the House of Commons of Canada
- In office January 12, 1916 – January 7, 1917
- Preceded by: Thomas Simpson Sproule
- Succeeded by: Edgar Nelson Rhodes

Member of the Canadian Parliament for Dorchester
- In office 1911–1917
- Preceded by: Joseph Alfred Ernest Roy
- Succeeded by: Lucien Cannon

Personal details
- Born: December 31, 1881 Tingwick, Quebec, Canada
- Died: May 14, 1961 (aged 79)
- Party: Conservative
- Cabinet: Minister of Inland Revenue (1917-1918), Minister of Mines (acting) (1917), Secretary of State of Canada (acting) (1917)

Albert Sévigny, PC (December 31, 1881 – May 14, 1961) was a Canadian politician, and a judge.

== Life and career ==
Sévigny was born in Tingwick, Quebec. He opened a law practice in Quebec City in 1905 and practiced until 1911.

=== Political career ===
In 1907, he was a candidate for the Quebec Conservative Party in a provincial by-election, but was defeated.

He was elected to the House of Commons of Canada in the 1911 federal election. His election was facilitated by an informal alliance between the Conservatives and the Nationalists led by Henri Bourassa because of Sevigny's sympathy with Bourassa's views.

In Parliament, Sevigny became a supporter of Canadian participation in World War I despite the strong opposition of most Quebecers, and became a staunch Conservative. He was appointed Deputy Speaker in 1915, and in 1916, he became Speaker of the House of Commons of Canada.

Prime Minister Robert Borden was facing an increasing divisive crisis over conscription with the country divided between English Canadians who supported the measure and French-Canadians who fervently opposed it. In early 1917, Borden asked Sevigny to leave the Speaker's chair and join the Cabinet to help the government persuade Quebecers of the government's case.

Sévigny was appointed Minister of Inland Revenue, and was required by the laws of the time to resign his seat and run in a by-election. He was re-elected by a margin of only 257 votes.

In June, Borden introduced conscription and, of the French Canadian Members of Parliament, only three voted for the conscription bill, including Sévigny.

Borden formed a Union government with dissident Liberals and called a general election in 1917 on the conscription issue. The country divided largely along linguistic lines: the Conservative candidates were wiped out in Quebec in a rout that cost Sévigny his seat. Borden's coalition dominated the election in English Canada, however, and he was returned with a strong majority.

=== Judicial career ===
In 1921, the Conservative government appointed Sévigny to the Quebec Superior Court on which he served for 39 years, becoming Associate Chief Justice in 1933 and Chief Justice in 1942.

In 1950, Sévigny presided over the murder trial of Albert Guay, who was responsible for the bombing of Canadian Pacific Air Lines Flight 108.

Political offices
Preceded by Esioff-Léon Patenaude	Minister of Mines (acting); 1917	Succeeded by Arthur Meighen
