= Alexander Morrison (politician) =

Canadian politician

Member of the Canada Parliament for Macdonald
- Preceded by: William D. Staples
- Succeeded by: Richard Coe Henders
- In office October 12, 1912 – November 10, 1913
- In office December 13, 1913 – October 6, 1917

Personal details
- Born: January 15, 1851 Kemptville, Canada West
- Died: January 24, 1930 (aged 79) Carman, Manitoba, Canada
- Party: Conservative

Alexander Morrison (January 15, 1851 – January 24, 1930) was a Canadian farmer and politician.

Born in Kemptville, Canada West, the son of William Morrison and Elizabeth Morrow, Morrison attended public school and then became a farmer in Homewood, Manitoba. He was Reeve of the Rural Municipality of Dufferin for six years before being elected to the House of Commons of Canada for Macdonald in a 1912 by-election. After the election was declared void in 1913, he was re-elected in the resulting by-election. A Conservative, he did not run for re-election in 1917. He died in 1930 in Carman, Manitoba.
