= Saint-Timothée, Quebec =

Saint-Timothée
- Former city
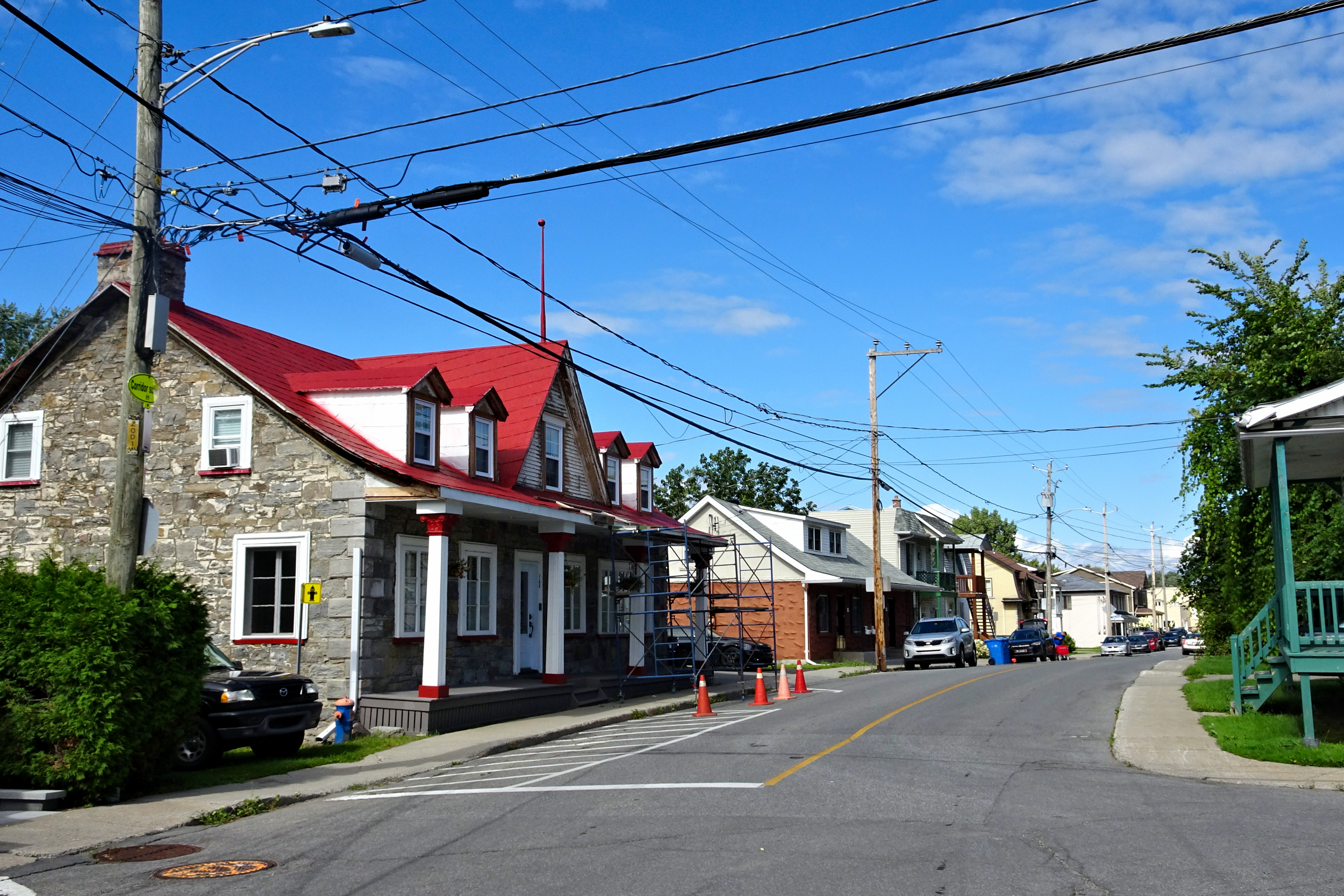
- Interactive map of Saint-Timothée
- Coordinates: 45°17′24″N 74°02′28″W
- Country: Canada
- Province: Quebec
- Region: Montérégie
- RCM: Beauharnois-Salaberry
- Municipality: Salaberry-de-Valleyfield
- Merged: Jan 01, 2002

Area
  - Land: 73.05 km^{2} (28.20 sq mi)

Population (2006)
  - Total: 8,564
  - Density: 117.2/km^{2} (304/sq mi)
  - Pop 2001-2006: ▲4.9%
  - Dwellings: 3,375
- Time zone: UTC-5 (EST)
  - Summer (DST): UTC-4 (EDT)
- Area code: 450
- Access Routes: A-30 R-132
- + Merged with Salaberry-de-Valleyfield

Saint-Timothée (French pronunciation: [sɛ̃ timɔte]) is a former city located in the Montérégie region of Quebec, Canada, on Île-de-Salaberry in the St. Lawrence River. It occupied the middle third and largest area of the island, which is part of the Hochelaga Archipelago. The municipality is flanked by the cities of Beauharnois to the east, and to the west by Salaberry-de-Valleyfield, which Saint-Timothée was merged with on January 1, 2002.

== See also ==
- 2000–2006 municipal reorganization in Quebec
- List of former cities in Quebec
