= William James Roche =

Canadian politician

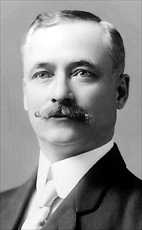
The Honourable William James Roche, PC

William James Roche, CMG PC (30 November 1859 – 30 September 1937) was a Canadian politician and Conservative Member of Parliament for the Manitoba riding of Marquette in the House of Commons of Canada from 1896 to 1917.

Born in Clandeboye, Canada West, the son of W. F. Roche, he was educated in Lucan and London, Ontario, at Trinity Medical College in Toronto and at the University of Western Ontario. Roche practised medicine in Minnedosa, Manitoba. In 1883, he married Annie E. Cook.

In 1892, Roche ran unsuccessfully for a seat in the Manitoba assembly. He was Secretary of State for External Affairs from 1911 to 1912. He also served as Minister of the Interior (1912–1917), Minister of Mines (1912–1913), and Superintendent-General of Indian Affairs (1912–1917). In 1934, he was made a Companion of the Order of St Michael and St George.

He died in Ottawa at the age of 77.
