= Alexander Haggart =

Canadian politician

The Honourable Alexander Haggart
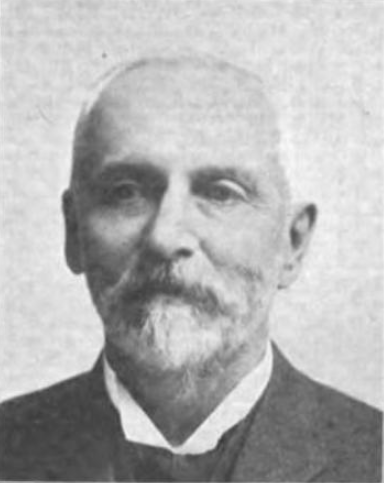

Member of the House of Commons of Canada
- In office 1909–1911
- Constituency: Winnipeg

Personal details
- Born: January 20, 1848; Peterborough, Ontario
- Died: February 19, 1927 (aged 79); Winnipeg, Manitoba
- Political party: Conservative
- Spouse: Elizabeth Littlehales (m. 1887)
- Education: Victoria University
- Occupation: Jurist, politician

Alexander Haggart (January 20, 1848 – February 19, 1927) was a Canadian lawyer, judge and political figure in Manitoba. He represented Winnipeg in the House of Commons of Canada from 1909 to 1911 as a Conservative.

== Biography ==
He was born in Peterborough, Canada West, the son of Archibald Haggart and Elizabeth McGregor, and was educated at Victoria University in Cobourg. He was called to the Ontario bar in 1878, first practised law in Toronto and then moved to Winnipeg in 1880, where he practised in partnership with Hugh John Macdonald and Albert Clements Killam. Haggart served as a member of the Winnipeg School Board. In 1887, he married Elizabeth Littlehales. He resigned his seat in the House of Commons in 1911 to allow Robert Rogers to run for election. He was president of the Law Society of Manitoba from 1906 to 1910. Haggart served in the Manitoba Court of Appeal from 1912 to 1920, retiring due to poor health. He died in Winnipeg at the age of 79.
