= Winnipeg (federal electoral district) =

Former federal electoral district in Manitoba, Canada

Winnipeg was a federal electoral district in Manitoba, Canada, that was represented in the House of Commons of Canada from 1882 to 1917.

This riding was created in 1882 from parts of Selkirk riding. It was abolished in 1914 when it was redistributed into Winnipeg Centre, Winnipeg North and Winnipeg South ridings. It consisted of the city of Winnipeg and the municipality of Fort Rouge.

== Election results ==
1882 Canadian federal election
Party	Candidate	Votes
Conservative	Thomas Scott	491
Liberal	Elias George Conklin	385
Independent Conservative	Col. William Osborne Smith	73

1887 Canadian federal election
Party	Candidate	Votes
Conservative	SCARTH, W.B.	1,754
Liberal	SUTHERLAND, Hugh	1,746

1891 Canadian federal election
Party	Candidate	Votes
Liberal–Conservative	MACDONALD, H.J.	2,131
Liberal	CAMPBELL, Isaac	1,622

By-election: On Mr. Macdonald's resignation, 4 May 1893

By-election on 2 November 1893
Party	Candidate	Votes
Liberal	MARTIN, Joseph	acclaimed

1896 Canadian federal election
Party	Candidate	Votes
Liberal–Conservative	MACDONALD, Hon. Hugh J.	2,961
Liberal	MARTIN, Joseph	2,835

By-election: On election being declared void, 29 March 1897

By-election on 27 April 1897
Party	Candidate	Votes
Liberal	JAMESON, Richard Willis	2,326
Conservative	TAYLOR, E.L.	1,209

By-election: On Mr. Jameson's death, 3 February 1899

By-election on 25 January 1900
Party	Candidate	Votes
Labour	PUTTEE, A.W.	2,431
Liberal	MARTIN, E.D.	2,423

1900 Canadian federal election
Party	Candidate	Votes
Independent Labour	PUTTEE, Arthur W.	3,441
Independent	MARTIN, Ed. Daniel	2,258

1904 Canadian federal election
Party	Candidate	Votes
Liberal	BOLE, D.W.	4,308
Conservative	EVANS, W.S.	4,032
Labour	PUTTEE, Arthur W.	1,290

1908 Canadian federal election
Party	Candidate	Votes
Conservative	HAGGART, Alexander	8,747
Liberal	CAMERON, Douglas C.	6,729
Socialist	HOUSTON, John Donald	1,977

1911 Canadian federal election
Party	Candidate	Votes
Conservative	HAGGART, Alexander	12,754
Liberal	ASHDOWN, James Henry	8,049
Socialist	RIGG, Richard Arthur	2,325

By-election: On Mr. Haggart's resignation, 11 October 1911

By-election on 27 October 1911
Party	Candidate	Votes
Conservative	ROGERS, Hon. R.	acclaimed

== Boundaries ==
1882 representation order

1892 representation order

1903 representation order

== See also ==
- List of Canadian electoral districts
- Historical federal electoral districts of Canada
