= Minister of Inland Revenue =

The Minister of Inland Revenue is the political office of Minister for the department of Inland Revenue which is responsible for the collection of taxes. "Minister of Inland Revenue" is a title held by politicians in different countries. As of 2017 the office (renamed as "Minister of Revenue") remains in use in New Zealand, held by Stuart Nash; no historical information about the New Zealand office is provided on the government web site.

== Other countries ==
In Canada the office of Minister of Inland Revenue was created by Statute 31 Vict., c. 49, and assented to on 22 May 1868. The first office holder was William Pearce Howland. In 1918 it was combined with The Department of Customs to become the Department of Customs and Inland Revenue. Arthur Lewis Sifton was Canadian Minister of Inland Revenue on 17 May 1918, the next day 18 May 1918, he was Canadian Minister of Customs and Inland Revenue. Since 1927, the position has been the Minister of National Revenue.

In Hong Kong the similar position is Commissioner of Inland Revenue.

In the United Kingdom, the Inland Revenue department was abolished in April 2005 and replaced by HM Revenue and Customs. Inland Revenue was not a ministry and its leader was not a minister.

== See also ==
- HM Revenue and Customs – Formed by the 2005 merger of the Inland Revenue and Customs and Excise
- Inland Revenue Department (Hong Kong) – a department of Hong Kong Government responsible for collecting tax
- Inland Revenue Department (New Zealand)
- Internal Revenue Service – United States tax collection department
- Minister of Inland Revenue (Canada)
