= Frederick Debartzch Monk =

Canadian politician (1856–1914)

The Honourable Frederick Debartzch Monk PC KC
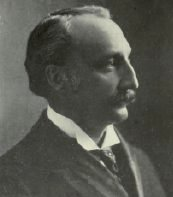

Member of the Canadian Parliament for Jacques Cartier
- In office 1896–1914
- Preceded by: Napoléon Charbonneau
- Succeeded by: Joseph Adélard Descarries

Personal details
- Born: April 6, 1856 Montreal, Canada East
- Died: May 15, 1914 (aged 58) Montreal, Quebec, Canada
- Party: Conservative
- Relations: Pierre-Dominique Debartzch, grandfather
- Children: Frederick Arthur Monk
- Cabinet: Minister of Public Works (1911–1912)

Frederick Debartzch Monk PC KC (April 6, 1856 – May 15, 1914) was a Canadian lawyer and politician.

Born in Montreal, Canada East, Monk was the son of Justice Samuel Cornwallis Monk (1814–1888) and Rosalie Caroline Debartzch (1819–1889), daughter of Pierre-Dominique Debartzch. His grandmother, Anne (Gugy) Monk was a daughter of Louis Gugy. He received a bachelor of civil law degree in 1877 from McGill University and was called to the Quebec Bar in 1878. From 1888 to 1914, he taught in the faculty of law at the Université Laval. In 1893, he was made a Queen's Counsel.

Monk was first elected to the House of Commons of Canada in 1896 as a Conservative member of Parliament for the riding of Jacques Cartier. He was re-elected in 1900, 1904 and 1908. In 1901 his political program, entitled "Canada for Canadians," presented his beliefs and hopes for Canada: respect for Canada's two founding "races," to whom, he said, it rightfully belonged, and a Canada autonomous in its relations with the British empire, and empowered to direct its own economic development. However his aspirations for Canada were seen to be opposed to the Conservative Party's long-standing belief in ties to Britain.

In 1909, Monk pressed the House of Commons to appoint a committee of MPs to investigate methods of proportional representation.

Monk was re-elected in 1911. He resigned from Cabinet on October 28, 1912, after disagreeing with Robert Borden over the refusal of a referendum on Canadian purchase of three dreadnought class ships for Wilfrid Laurier's "Tin Pot Navy." From 1911 to 1912, he was the minister of public works. Monk continued as a backbench MP, though his relations with the Conservative Party were increasingly strained, until March 2, 1914, when he resigned from the House of Commons due to ill health. He died two months later and was entombed at the Notre Dame des Neiges Cemetery in Montreal.

His son, Frederick Arthur Monk, was a member of the Legislative Assembly of Quebec from 1935 to 1936.

== Electoral record ==
1896 Canadian federal election: Jacques Cartier
Party	Candidate	Votes
Conservative	Frederick Debartzch Monk	2,329
Liberal	Arthur Boyer	2,216

1900 Canadian federal election: Jacques Cartier
Party	Candidate	Votes
Conservative	Frederick Debartzch Monk	2,682
Liberal	Jérémie L. Décarie	2,390

1904 Canadian federal election: Jacques Cartier
Party	Candidate	Votes
Conservative	Frederick Debartzch Monk	3,095
Liberal	Louis A. Boyer	2,755

1908 Canadian federal election: Jacques Cartier
Party	Candidate	Votes	%	±%
Conservative	Frederick Debartzch Monk	4,143	56.65	+3.75
Liberal	Ucal Henri Dandurand	3,170	34.34	-3.75
Total valid votes		7,313		
Conservative hold		Swing		+3.75

1911 Canadian federal election: Jacques Cartier
Party	Candidate	Votes	%	±%
Conservative	Frederick Debartzch Monk	5,782	56.55	-0.10
Liberal	Louis-Joseph-Charles-Émile Boyer	4,442	43.45	+0.10
Total valid votes		10,224		
Conservative hold		Swing		-0.10

By-election: On Monk being appointed minister of public works, October 10, 1911

By-election on 27 October 1911
Party	Candidate	Votes
Conservative	Frederick Debartzch Monk	acclaimed

== Archives ==
There is a Frederick Debartzch Monk fonds at Library and Archives Canada.
