= Esioff-Léon Patenaude =

Canadian politician (1875–1963)

The Honourable Esioff-Léon Patenaude PC QC
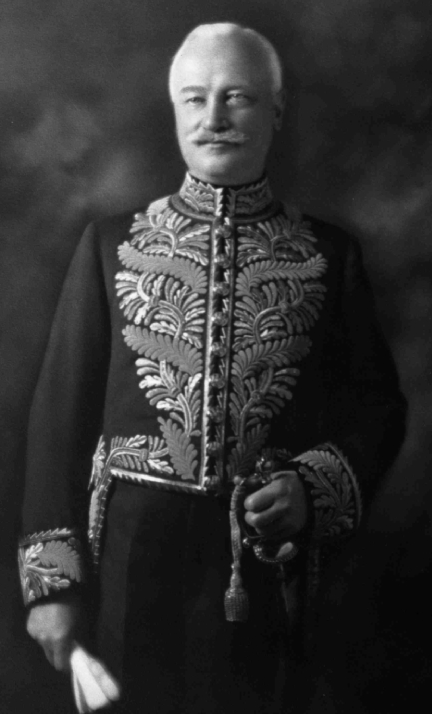

17th Lieutenant Governor of Quebec
- In office 29 April 1934 – 30 December 1939
- Monarchs: George V Edward VIII; George VI
- Governors General: The Earl of Bessborough; The Lord Tweedsmuir
- Premier: Louis-Alexandre Taschereau; Adélard Godbout; Maurice Duplessis
- Preceded by: Henry George Carroll
- Succeeded by: Eugène Fiset

Member of the Canadian Parliament for Hochelaga
- In office 15 October 1915 – 17 December 1917
- Preceded by: Louis Coderre
- Succeeded by: Joseph Edmond Lesage

Member of the Legislative Assembly of Quebec for Laprairie
- In office 8 June 1908 – 15 October 1915
- Preceded by: Côme-Séraphin Cherrier
- Succeeded by: Wilfrid Cédilot

Member of the Legislative Assembly of Quebec for Jacques-Cartier
- In office 5 February 1923 – 8 October 1925
- Preceded by: Joseph-Séraphin-Aimé Ashby
- Succeeded by: Victor Marchand

Personal details
- Born: 12 February 1875 Saint-Isidore, Quebec
- Died: 7 February 1963 (aged 87) Montreal, Quebec
- Resting place: Notre Dame des Neiges Cemetery
- Party: Conservative
- Other political affiliations: Conservative Party of Quebec
- Spouse: Georgiana Deniger dit Poupart
- Cabinet: Minister of Inland Revenue; Secretary of State of Canada; Minister of Mines; Minister of Marine and Fisheries (Acting); Minister of Justice and Attorney General of Canada

Esioff-Léon Patenaude, PC, QC, often called E.L. Patenaude (12 February 1875 – 7 February 1963), was a Canadian statesman who served as the 17th Lieutenant Governor of Quebec. Born in Saint-Isidore, Quebec, in 1875, he studied law at the University of Montreal and was called to the Quebec Bar in 1899. He established a successful law practice, was soon drawn to politics, and served as a chief organizer for the Conservative Party of Canada in Montreal.

He was first elected to the Quebec National Assembly as a Conservative in La Prairie in the 1908 provincial election and was re-elected in the 1912 election. In 1915, he was elected to the House of Commons of Canada in a by-election and joined the government of Prime Minister Sir Robert Borden as Minister of Inland Revenue. He served in that position until early 1917, when he was appointed as Secretary of State and Minister of Mines. In July, however, Patenaude resigned from the Canadian Cabinet in protest of the government's decision to implement conscription. He chose not to seek re-election in the 1917 federal election. When Arthur Meighen became Prime Minister in 1920, he offered Patenaude a seat in cabinet, who declined.

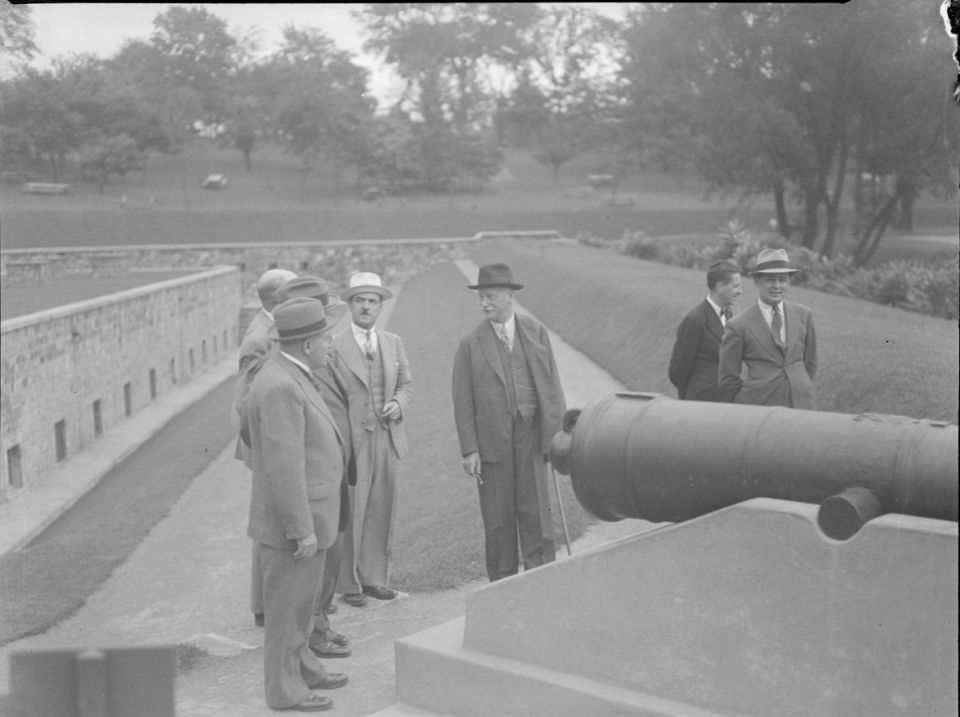
Esioff-Léon Patenaude at Saint Helen's Island, 1938

Returning to provincial politics, Patenaude was re-elected to the Quebec National Assembly in Jacques-Cartier in 1923. In 1925, however, Meighen persuaded Patenaude to return to federal politics as his Quebec lieutenant. He was given almost exclusive authority over the Conservative Party's campaign in Quebec during the 1925 federal election as Meighen's Quebec lieutenant. Patenaude proved, however, to be little match for Ernest Lapointe and the Liberal Party of Canada, and secured only 4 seats in the province. Patenaude, who had resigned his seat in the Quebec National Assembly to contest the election, was himself defeated.

Despite the setback, Patenaude continued to enjoy the favour of Meighen. When Meighen formed a second government in 1926, he appointed Patenaude as Minister of Justice and Attorney General of Canada. Patenaude led the Conservative Party in Quebec for a second time during the 1926 federal election but again fared poorly and was himself defeated.

In 1934, the Governor General of Canada, on the advice of Canadian Prime Minister Richard Bedford Bennett, appointed Patenaude as Lieutenant Governor of Quebec, a position in which he served until his retirement from public life in 1939. In his later years, he experienced a successful career as a banker (became President of the Provincial Bank of Canada in 1946) and businessman (as director of McColl Frontenac, Crown Life Insurance and board of Texaco Canada).

== Electoral record ==
By-election on 15 October 1915 Coderre appointed Puisne Judge, Superior Court of Quebec, 6 October 1915
| Party | Candidate | Votes |
| Conservative | Esioff-Léon Patenaude | acclaimed |

Political offices
| Preceded by Pierre Edouard Blondin | Minister of Inland Revenue; 1915–1917 | Succeeded by Albert Sevigny |
| Preceded by Pierre Edouard Blondin | Secretary of State for Canada; 1917 | Succeeded by Albert Sevigny |
| Preceded by Pierre Edouard Blondin | Minister of Mines; 1917 | Succeeded by Albert Sevigny |
| Preceded by Hugh Guthrie | Minister of Justice; 1926 | Succeeded by Ernest Lapointe |
| Preceded by William Anderson Black | Minister of Marine and Fisheries; 1926 | Succeeded by Pierre Joseph Arthur Cardin |
