= List of prime ministers of Canada by time in office =

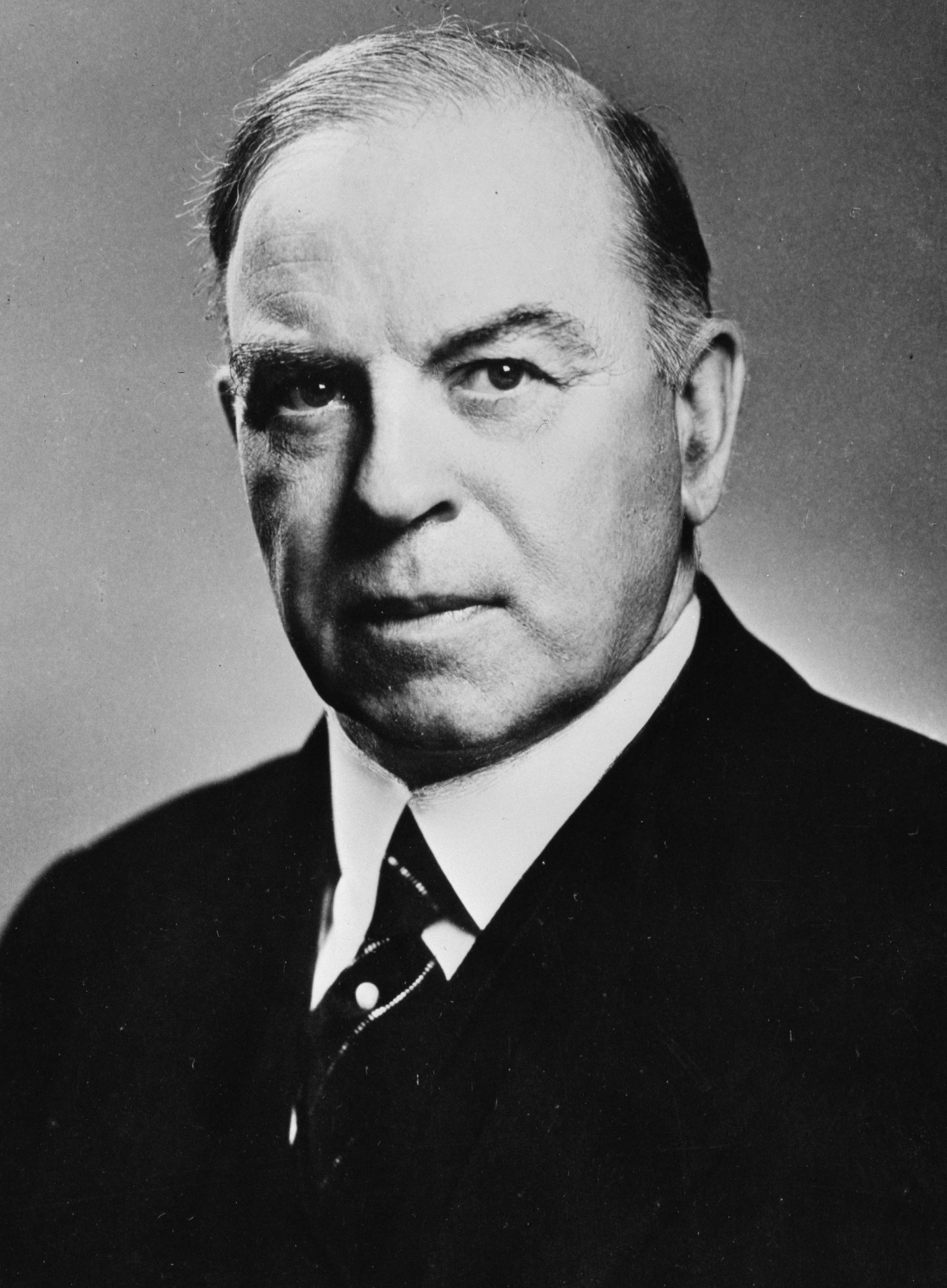
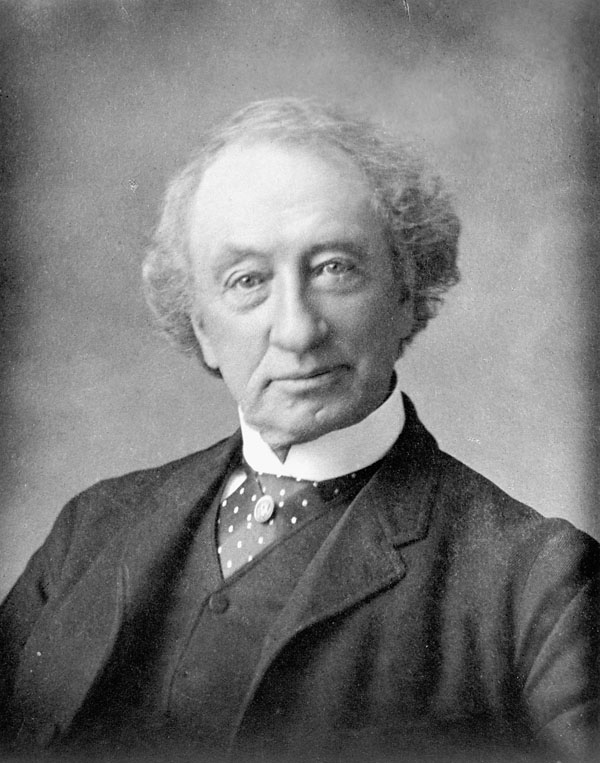
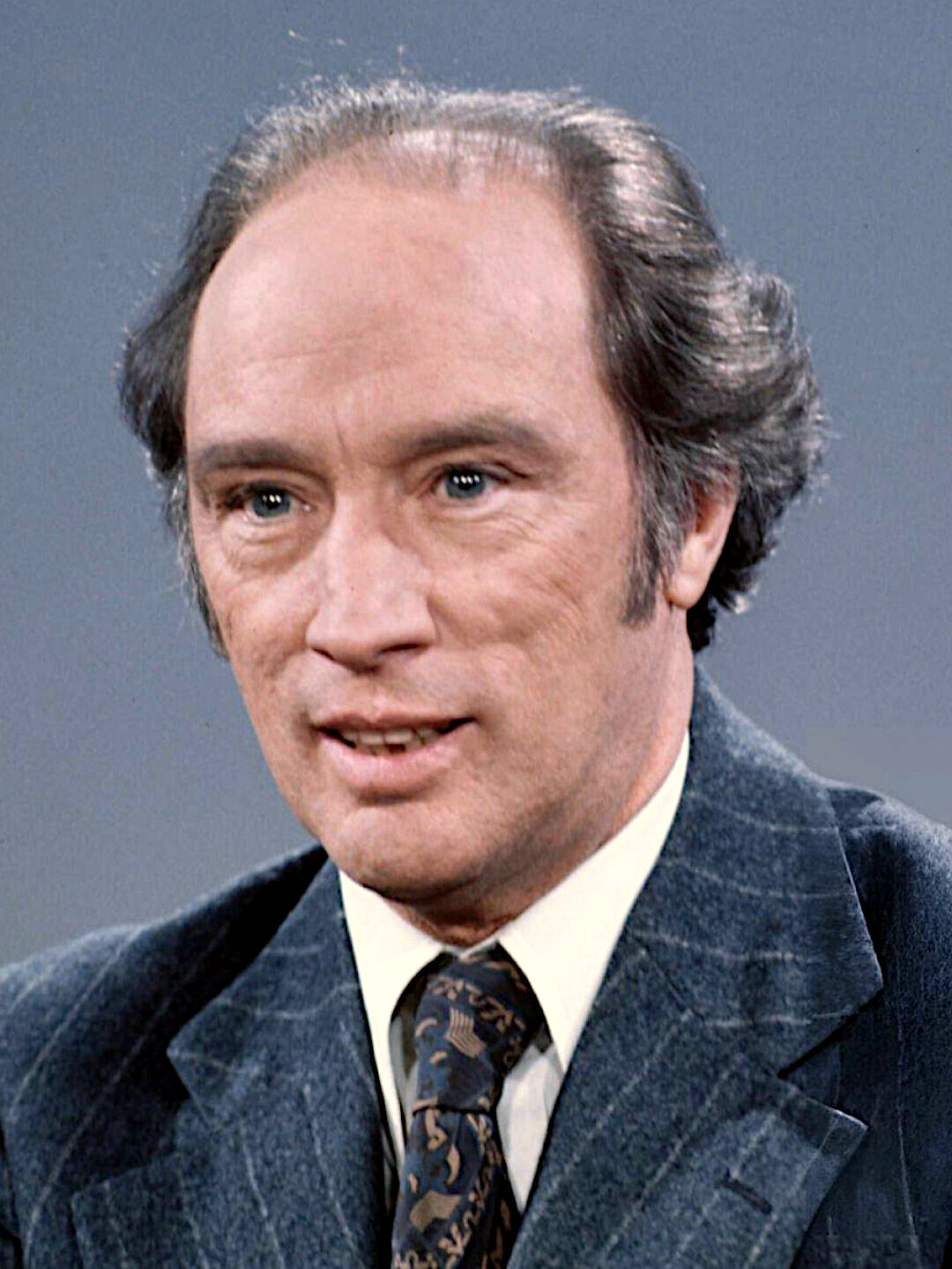
Canada's three longest-serving prime ministers, left to right:
William Lyon Mackenzie King; 21 years, 154 days
Sir John A. Macdonald; 18 years, 359 days
Pierre Trudeau; 15 years, 164 days
All served non-consecutive terms.
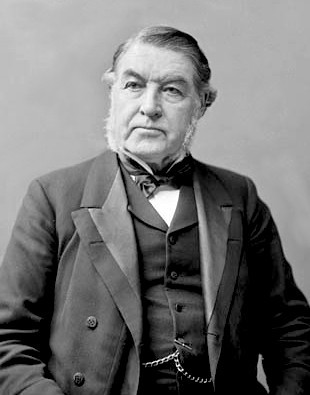
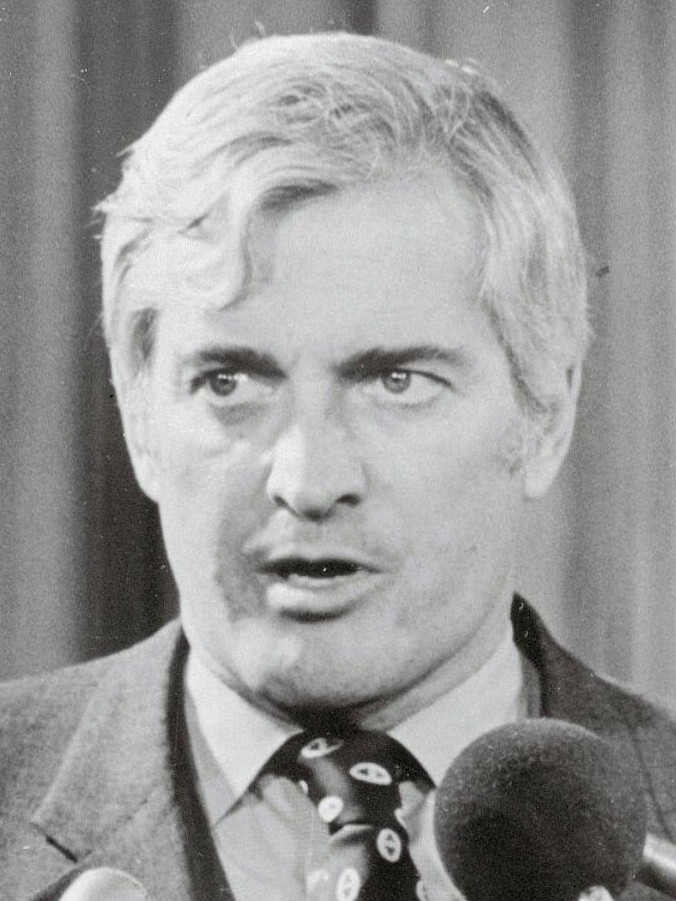
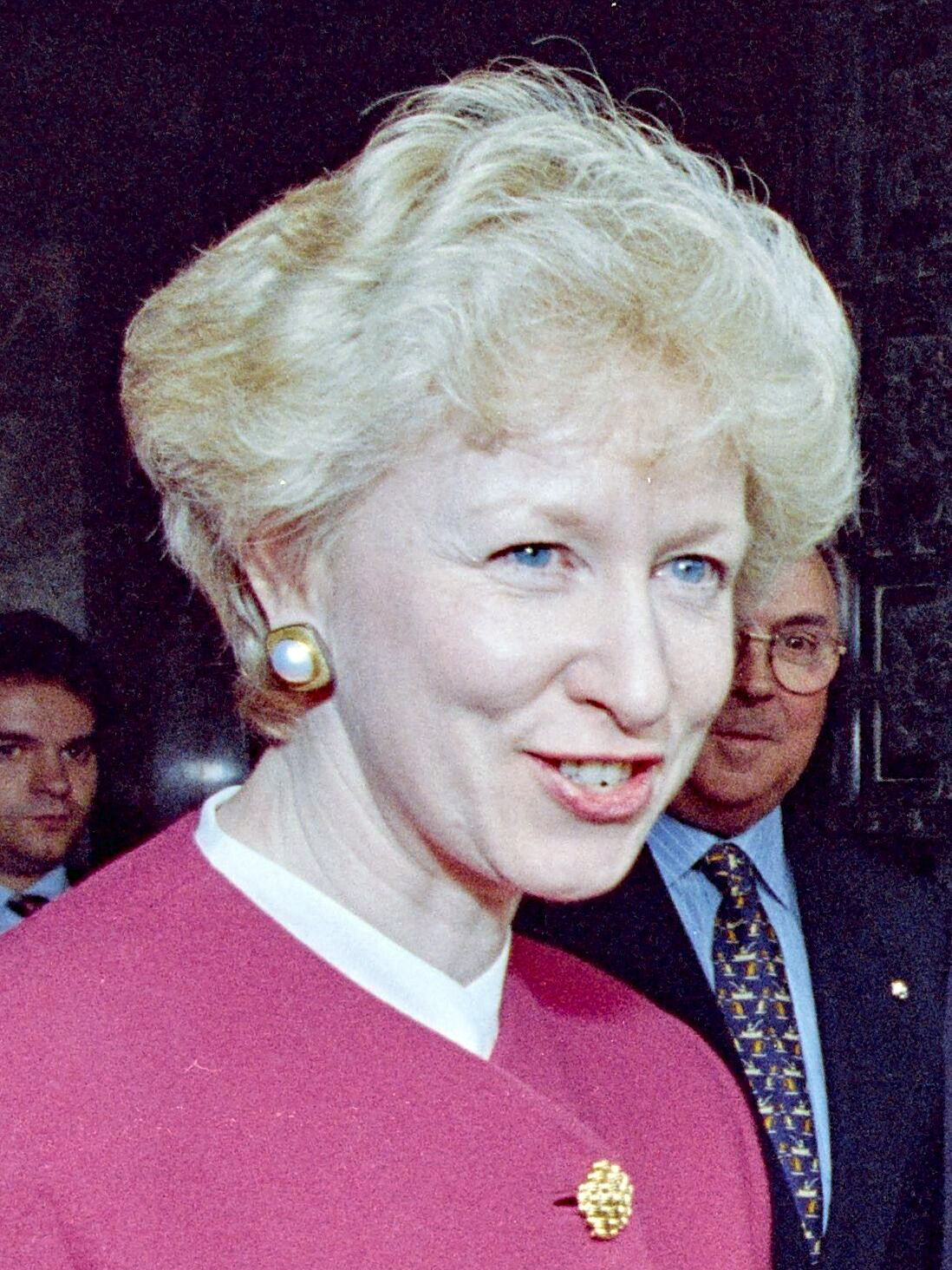
Canada's three shortest-serving prime ministers, left to right:
Sir Charles Tupper; 68 days
John Turner; 79 days
Kim Campbell; 132 days

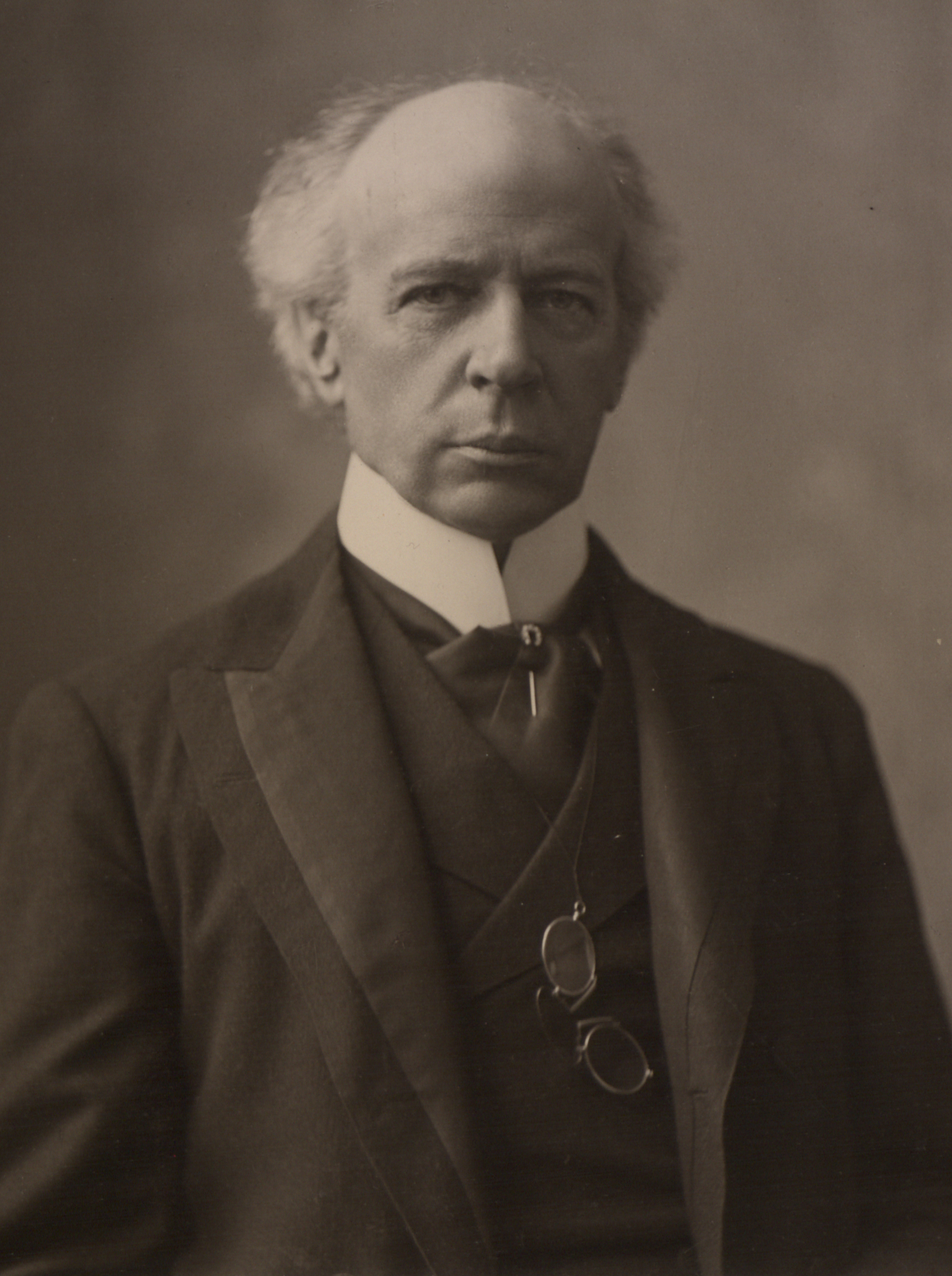
Sir Wilfrid Laurier, the longest consecutively serving prime minister

The prime minister of Canada is the head of government of Canada. Since Canadian Confederation in 1867, there have been 24 prime ministers who have formed 30 Canadian ministries. The first prime minister, Sir John A. Macdonald, took office on July 1, 1867. The position does not have a set term of office and does not have term limits. Instead, prime ministers can stay in office as long as their government has the confidence of a majority in the House of Commons of Canada under the system of responsible government. Under this system, William Lyon Mackenzie King was Canada's longest-serving prime minister, holding office for a total of 21 years and 154 days over three non-consecutive terms.

The prime minister's term begins upon appointment by the governor general of Canada, usually after winning a general election. One prime minister can also succeed another with no election—usually, but not necessarily, when they are successive leaders of the same party. A prime minister stays in office until they resign, die or are dismissed by the governor general. Two prime ministers have died in office (Macdonald and Sir John Thompson). All others have resigned, either after losing an election, a parliamentary no confidence vote, or upon retirement. Theoretically, the monarch or governor general can dismiss a prime minister, but that has never happened.

The prime ministerial term is not tied directly to the term of the House of Commons, which the Constitution sets as a maximum of five years from the most recent general election. A prime minister takes office after winning an election and resigns after losing an election, but the term in office does not match up directly to the term of the Parliament. An incoming prime minister will normally take office a few weeks after the election, and an outgoing prime minister will usually stay in office for a few weeks after losing the election. The transition period and the date for the transfer of office are negotiated by the incoming and the outgoing prime ministers.

A prime minister who holds office in consecutive parliaments is not re-appointed as prime minister for each parliament, but rather serves one continuous term. When a prime minister holds office in more than one parliament, it is customarily referred to as the prime minister's first government, second government, and so on.

A majority government normally lasts around four years, since general elections for Parliament are normally held every four years. Minority governments generally last for a shorter period. The shortest minority government, Arthur Meighen's second government, lasted just under three months. A prime minister who is selected by the governing party to replace an outgoing prime minister may also serve a short term, if the new prime minister is defeated at the general election. Charles Tupper served the shortest term in Canadian history, only sixty-eight days, in this way. He was selected by the Conservative Party to replace Mackenzie Bowell just before the general election of 1896, which Tupper and the Conservatives lost. John Turner and Kim Campbell both served short terms for similar reasons.

Of the other prime ministers who served short terms, Arthur Meighen, Joe Clark, and Paul Martin had their time in office cut short by the collapse of their minority governments and the subsequent election of the opposition party. Two prime ministers have served without ever sitting in the House of Commons during their time in office: Tupper (Note: Tupper was re-elected to the House of Commons on February 4, 1896, after an absence of four years, and served as government house leader in the House of Commons under Prime Minister Mackenzie Bowell until the 7th Parliament was dissolved on April 24, 1896. He replaced Bowell as prime minister on May 1, 1896 and fought the 1896 federal election, but was defeated. He resigned as prime minister on July 8, 1896, replaced by Wilfrid Laurier. When the 8th Parliament was first summoned, he was no longer prime minister.) and Turner. (Note: Turner was sworn in as prime minister on June 30, 1984, but did not have a seat in the House of Commons. The 32nd Parliament was dissolved on July 9, 1984. Turner fought the 1984 federal election, but the Liberals were defeated by the Progressive Conservatives under Brian Mulroney. Turner resigned as prime minister on September 16, 1984. He was personally elected to the House of Commons in the 1984 election, but did not take his seat until the 33rd Parliament was first summoned on November 5, 1984.) Campbell was sworn in as prime minister on June 25, 1993. She did not face parliament as prime minister prior to it being dissolved on September 8, 1993 for the 1993 Canadian federal election.

In the late nineteenth century, three prime ministers succeeded to the office and did not call an election: John Abbott, who resigned for health reasons, and Thompson, who died in office. Bowell resigned after a Cabinet revolt.

On seven occasions from the twentieth century, a prime minister has retired and the governing party has selected a new party leader, who automatically became prime minister. Meighen (1920), Louis St. Laurent (1948), Pierre Trudeau (1968), Turner (1984), Campbell (1993), Martin (2003) and Mark Carney (2025) all succeeded to the office in this way. The new prime minister may continue to govern in the parliament called by the previous prime minister, but normally calls an election within a few months. Meighen was the exception, governing for over a year before calling an election. In those cases, the time before and after the election is counted as one government for the purposes of this table.

When a general election is called, the prime minister stays in office during the campaign. If the prime minister's party wins the election, the prime minister remains in office without being sworn in again; the prime minister's tenure of office is continuous. If defeated in the election, the outgoing prime minister stays in office during the transition period, until the new prime minister takes office. All of that time is included in the total "Time in office". The first day of a prime minister's term is counted in the total, but the last day is not.

For the first half century of Confederation, there were gaps between the term of an outgoing prime minister and the incoming prime minister. The shortest gap, two days, was between Macdonald and Alexander Mackenzie in 1873: Macdonald resigned office on November 5, 1873, and Mackenzie was appointed on November 7. The longest gap, ten days, was upon the death of Macdonald on June 6, 1891. Abbott did not take office until June 16, 1891. The last time there was a gap, of four days, occurred between Laurier and Robert Borden: Laurier resigned effective October 6, 1911, and Borden took office on October 10. There have been no gaps in office since that transition, with the new prime minister taking office the day after the former prime minister leaves office.

== Table of prime ministers ==
Canadian custom is to count by the individuals who were prime minister, not by terms. Since Confederation, 24 prime ministers have been appointed by the governor general to form 30 Canadian Ministries.

Historical conservative parties/Progressive Conservative Party of Canada (12)
Liberal Party of Canada (11)
Conservative Party of Canada (1)

	Prime Minister	Party	Total time in office	Dates in office	Number of governments	Comments
1	William Lyon Mackenzie King	Liberal	21 years, 154 days	1921-12-29 to 1926-06-28 (4 years, 181 days) 1926-09-25 to 1930-08-06 (3 years, 315 days) 1935-10-23 to 1948-11-15 (13 years, 23 days)	Six governments in total. Three majority governments: 1921–1925; 1935–1940; 1940–1945 Three minority governments: 1925–1926; 1926–1930; 1945–1948	King served three non-consecutive terms: from 1921 to the spring of 1926 (one majority and one minority government); from the fall of 1926 to 1930 (minority government); and from 1935 to 1948 (two majority governments and one minority government). First term: King began his first term after winning a narrow majority government in the election of 1921, defeating Prime Minister Meighen. His government fluctuated between majority and minority over the course of four years, due to by-elections and political developments. He won a minority government in the 1925 election, but that government was cut short by the King-Byng Affair. To avoid a motion of non-confidence in the Commons, King asked the governor general, Viscount Byng to call an election. Byng refused and King resigned. Byng appointed Meighen as prime minister, but Meighen's government fell after only four days in office, triggering a general election, which King won. Second term: King began his second term when he won a minority government in the 1926 election. His second term lasted until 1930, when he was defeated by R.B. Bennett in the 1930 general election and resigned as prime minister. He stayed on as party leader and became Leader of the Opposition. Third term: King began his third and longest term when he won the election of 1935, defeating Prime Minister Bennett and winning a majority government. He won the subsequent elections in 1940 and 1945, and retired in 1948. He was succeeded by Louis St. Laurent.
2	Sir John A. Macdonald	Conservative	18 years, 359 days	1867-07-01 to 1873-11-05 (6 years, 127 days) 1878-10-17 to 1891-06-06 (12 years, 232 days)	Six majority governments: 1867–1872; 1872–1873; 1878–1882; 1882–1887; 1887–1891; 1891	Macdonald served two non-consecutive terms: from July 1, 1867, to the fall of 1873 (two majority governments), and from 1878 until his death in 1891 (four majority governments). First term: The governor-general, Viscount Monck, appointed Macdonald the first prime minister of Canada on July 1, 1867 prior to the first general election, which Macdonald won. His second government, elected in 1872, was cut short by the Pacific Scandal. When it became apparent that he had lost the confidence of the Commons in the fall of 1873, Macdonald resigned as prime minister, remaining party leader and becoming leader of the opposition. The governor-general, the Earl of Dufferin, appointed Alexander Mackenzie as prime minister. Mackenzie then called the general election of 1874, which he won. Second term: Returned to power after defeating Prime Minister Mackenzie in the election of 1878, Macdonald won four successive majority governments. His last government, elected in April, 1891, ended upon his death on June 6, 1891. The office of prime minister was vacant for ten days from Macdonald's death on June 6, 1891, until the appointment of Sir John Abbott as prime minister on June 16, 1891. After Abbott, three other individuals served in turn as prime minister until the next election in 1896.
3	Pierre Trudeau	Liberal	15 years, 164 days	1968-04-20 to 1979-06-04 (11 years, 45 days) 1980-03-03 to 1984-06-30 (4 years, 119 days)	Five governments in total. Three majority governments: 1968–1972; 1974–1979; 1980–1984 Two minority governments: 1968; 1972–1974	Trudeau served two non-consecutive terms: from 1968 to 1979 (two majority governments and two minority governments), and then from 1980 to 1984 (one majority government). First term: When Prime Minister Pearson retired, Trudeau won the Liberal leadership and became prime minister on April 20, 1968, initially with a minority government. He called a general election for June 25, 1968, winning a majority government. He remained in office for two more elections, but was defeated by Joe Clark in the 1979 general election. Trudeau resigned the leadership of the Liberal Party and announced his retirement from politics, staying on as interim leader until the Liberals elected a new party leader. Second term: In the first session of the new parliament it became clear that Clark's government was quickly losing popular support. The Liberals and the New Democratic Party combined to defeat the budget of the Clark government. Since that was a confidence matter, Clark was forced to call an election. Trudeau resumed the leadership of the Liberal Party and defeated Prime Minister Clark in the 1980 election, winning a majority government. He stayed in office until 1984, when he announced his retirement after taking a walk in the snow. He was succeeded by John Turner.
4	Sir Wilfrid Laurier	Liberal	15 years, 87 days	1896-07-11 to 1911-10-06	Four majority governments: 1896–1900; 1900–1904; 1904–1908; 1908–1911	Laurier served one continuous term of fifteen years, the longest uninterrupted term of any prime minister. He took office after defeating Prime Minister Tupper in the 1896 general election. During his term, he won four majority governments. He was defeated by Robert Borden in the 1911 general election and resigned as prime minister, he remained the leader of the Liberal Party as leader of the opposition until his death in 1919.
5	Jean Chrétien	Liberal	10 years, 38 days	1993-11-04 to 2003-12-12	Three majority governments: 1993–1997; 1997–2000; 2001–2003	Chrétien served for one term, winning three majority governments. He took office after defeating Prime Minister Campbell in the 1993 general election and stayed in power for ten years. After a leadership challenge within the Liberal Party from Paul Martin, he retired as prime minister and leader of the Liberal Party on December 12, 2003, and was replaced by Martin.
6	Stephen Harper	Conservative	9 years, 271 days	2006-02-06 to 2015-11-04	Three governments in total. Two minority governments: 2006–2008; 2008–2011 One majority government: 2011–2015	Harper served for one term, winning two minority governments and one majority government. He took office after defeating Prime Minister Martin in the 2006 general election and stayed in office for nine years. He was defeated by Justin Trudeau in the 2015 general election and resigned as prime minister.
7	Justin Trudeau	Liberal	9 years, 130 days	2015-11-04 to 2025-03-14	Three governments in total. One majority government: 2015–2019 Two minority governments: 2019–2021; 2021–2025	Trudeau served for one term, winning one majority government and two minority governments. In his second minority government, he held a de facto majority due to a confidence and supply agreement with the New Democratic Party from March 22, 2022 to September 4, 2024. He took office after defeating Prime Minister Harper in the 2015 general election, remaining in office with a minority government following both the 2019 and the 2021 general elections. After a political crisis, he resigned as prime minister and leader of the Liberal Party on March 14, 2025, and was replaced by Mark Carney.
8	Brian Mulroney	Progressive Conservative	8 years, 281 days	1984-09-17 to 1993-06-25	Two majority governments: 1984–1988; 1988–1993	Mulroney served for one term, winning two majority governments. He took office after defeating Prime Minister Turner in the 1984 general election. He won the largest number of seats in Canadian history: 211 out of 295 seats in the House of Commons. He retired in 1993 and was succeeded by Kim Campbell.
9	Sir Robert Borden	Conservative; Unionist	8 years, 274 days	1911-10-10 to 1917-10-12 1917-10-12 to 1920-07-10	Two majority governments: 1911–1917; 1917–1921	Borden served two consecutive terms, the only prime minister to do so, as a war-time measure. First term: Borden was elected in the 1911 general election, defeating Prime Minister Laurier and forming a majority government. Second term: During the Conscription Crisis in World War I, Borden, a Conservative, approached Laurier and the Liberals to form a coalition war-time government. Laurier refused, but a large number of Liberals joined Borden, who formed a Unionist government. He was formally re-appointed as prime minister in the new government. Borden stayed in office after the end of the war, resigning in 1920. He was succeeded by Arthur Meighen.
10	Louis St. Laurent	Liberal	8 years, 218 days	1948-11-15 to 1957-06-21	Three governments in total. One minority government: 1948–1949 Two majority governments: 1949–1953; 1953–1957	St. Laurent served for one term over three parliaments, initially with a minority government, then with two majority governments. After King announced his retirement in 1948, St. Laurent won the Liberal leadership and became prime minister. He won the general election of 1949 and stayed in office until 1957. He was defeated by Diefenbaker in the 1957 general election and resigned.
11	John Diefenbaker	Progressive Conservative	5 years, 305 days	1957-06-21 to 1963-04-22	Three governments in total. Two minority governments: 1957–1958; 1962–1963 One majority government: 1958–1962	Diefenbaker served for one term, with two minority governments and one majority government. In the 1957 general election, Diefenbaker defeated Prime Minister St. Laurent by winning a minority government. After a short parliamentary session of less than four months, Diefenbaker called a general election in early 1958. He won the largest majority ever in Canadian history up to that time (208 seats of the 265 seats in the House of Commons). However, in the subsequent 1962 general election, he was reduced to a minority government, which lasted only half a year before being defeated on a confidence measure. In the 1963 general election, Diefenbaker was defeated by Pearson, who won a minority government. Diefenbaker resigned as prime minister.
12	R. B. Bennett	Conservative	5 years, 77 days	1930-08-07 to 1935-10-23	One majority government: 1930–1935	Bennett served for one term, with one majority government. He defeated Prime Minister King in the 1930 general election, but in turn lost to King in the 1935 general election. He resigned as prime minister and retired from Canadian politics, sitting in the British House of Lords for many years.
13	Lester B. Pearson	Liberal	4 years, 364 days	1963-04-22 to 1968-04-20	Two minority governments: 1963–1965; 1965–1968	Pearson served for one term, with two minority governments. He defeated Prime Minister Diefenbaker in the 1963 general election. He maintained power, again with a minority government, in the 1965 general election. After he announced his retirement in 1968, Pierre Trudeau was elected leader of the Liberal Party and succeeded him as prime minister.
14	Alexander Mackenzie	Liberal	4 years, 336 days	1873-11-07 to 1878-10-09	One majority government: 1873–1878	Mackenzie served one term, over two parliaments. He was appointed prime minister in the fall of 1873 by the governor-general, the Earl of Dufferin, after Prime Minister Macdonald resigned over the Pacific Scandal. Mackenzie then called a general election early in 1874, in which he won a majority government. However, he lost the next general election in 1878 to Macdonald, and resigned as prime minister.
15	Paul Martin	Liberal	2 years, 56 days (Note: For the purposes of this table, when a prime minister takes office by succeeding to the party leadership, the time before and after the prime minister's first election is treated as one government.)	2003-12-12 to 2006-02-06	One majority government: 2003–2004 One minority government: 2004–2006	Martin served for one term over two parliaments, initially with a majority government, then with a minority government. He became prime minister in December 2003, after winning the leadership of the Liberal Party after Prime Minister Chrétien announced he would step down. He inherited the 37th Parliament, in which the Liberals held a majority, and held one session in the spring of 2004. He then called the general election of 2004, in which his government was reduced to a minority. Martin's government fell on a confidence vote in late 2005, forcing him to call the general election of 2006. Harper and the Conservative Party won a minority government in that election and Martin resigned as prime minister.
16	Sir John Thompson	Conservative	2 years, 7 days	1892-12-05 to 1894-12-12	One majority government: 1892–1894	Thompson served one term of just over two years. He was the second prime minister to lead the Conservative government after Macdonald's death in 1891, prior to the next election in 1896. He had a majority in the parliament elected in the 1891 election, but never led his government in an election, as he died suddenly in 1894 at Windsor Castle. The office of prime minister was vacant for nine days until the governor general, the Earl of Aberdeen, appointed Mackenzie Bowell as prime minister. Thompson was the second and last prime minister of Canada to die in office.
17	Arthur Meighen	Conservative	1 year, 260 days	1920-07-10 to 1921-12-29 (1 year, 172 days) 1926-06-29 to 1926-09-25 (88 days)	Two governments in total. One majority government: 1920–1921 One minority government: 1926	Meighen served two short non-consecutive terms, in 1920–1921 and 1926. First term: When Borden announced his retirement in 1920, the Conservative party caucus asked him to recommend his successor. After consulting with the individual members of caucus, he recommended that Meighen be the new party leader. The caucus accepted that recommendation and Meighen became party leader and prime minister. He governed for just over a year with a majority in the parliament elected under Borden's leadership in the 1917 election, then called the general election of 1921. He was defeated by King, who won a narrow majority government. Meighen resigned as prime minister, but remained as party leader. He had lost his own seat, but was elected in a by-election and returned to Parliament in January 1922. He served as Leader of the Opposition for the next four years. Second term: Meighen served a second term of just under three months in 1926. In the 1925 election, Meighen and the Conservatives won more seats than King and the Liberals, but did not win a majority. King was able to keep governing with the support of the Progressives until he faced a motion of censure in the Commons in the spring of 1926. The governor general refused King's request for a dissolution of Parliament and King resigned as prime minister. Governor General Byng then appointed Meighen as prime minister, but Meighen's government fell within four days, defeated in Parliament. The governor general now granted the dissolution of Parliament, triggering a general election. Meighen lost the 1926 election to King and again was defeated in his own riding. He resigned as prime minister for the second time.
18	Mark Carney (Incumbent)	Liberal	1 year, 253 days (As of November 22, 2026)	2025-03-14 to present	One minority government, one minority/majority government: 2025; 2025–present	Carney is currently serving for one term over two parliaments, initially with a minority government carried over from the 44th Parliament, then with another minority government in the 45th Parliament. His second government became a majority government on April 13, 2026, following 5 floor crossings to the Liberal Party and 3 by-election victories. He became prime minister in March 2025, after winning the leadership of the Liberal Party after Prime Minister Justin Trudeau announced his resignation. He inherited the 44th Parliament, in which the Liberals held a minority. He then called the general election of 2025, in which his government returned to another minority. He is the first prime minister to have never previously held elected office.
19	Sir John Abbott	Conservative	1 year, 161 days	1891-06-16 to 1892-11-24	One majority government: 1891–1892	Abbott served one short term of just over a year. Following Macdonald's death in the spring of 1891, Abbott was appointed prime minister by the governor general, Lord Stanley, on the recommendation of the Cabinet. He was the first of four prime ministers to serve after Macdonald's death and prior to the next election, in 1896. He had a majority in the parliament elected in the 1891 election, but never led his government in an election, as he retired in 1892 for health reasons.
20	Sir Mackenzie Bowell	Conservative	1 year, 128 days	1894-12-21 to 1896-04-27	One majority government: 1894–1896	Bowell served one short term of just over a year. After Thompson's sudden death in office in late 1894, Bowell was appointed prime minister by the governor general, the Earl of Aberdeen. Bowell was the third prime minister to lead the Conservative government after Macdonald's death in 1891, prior to the next election in 1896. He had a majority in the parliament elected in the 1891 election, but never led his government in an election. He resigned from office after a Cabinet revolt over his handling of the Manitoba Schools Question.
21	Joe Clark	Progressive Conservative	273 days	1979-06-04 to 1980-03-03	One minority government: 1979–1980	Joe Clark served one short term in a minority government. In office for just nine months, Clark's term was the shortest for a prime minister who won an election. Clark and the Progressive Conservatives defeated Prime Minister Pierre Trudeau and the Liberals in the 1979 general election, but only won a minority in the Commons. The popularity of the Clark government dropped sharply after the election, and in December 1979, the opposition parties, the Liberals and New Democrats, combined to defeat the government's budget. Since that was a confidence measure, Clark was forced to call an election in early 1980, which he lost to Trudeau and the Liberals. He resigned as prime minister.
22	Kim Campbell	Progressive Conservative	132 days	1993-06-25 to 1993-11-04	One majority government: 1993	Campbell served one short term as prime minister. After Brian Mulroney announced his retirement in early 1993, Campbell won the leadership of the Progressive Conservative party and became prime minister in June 1993. She called an election shortly afterwards but was defeated in the largest electoral loss by a federal government in Canadian history, going from a majority in the thirty-fourth parliament to only two seats in the thirty-fifth parliament. Campbell lost her own seat and resigned as party leader. Campbell is one of three prime ministers to never face the House of Commons during her tenure, the other two being Sir Charles Tupper and John Turner. However, unlike Turner and Tupper, she had a seat in the House.
23	John Turner	Liberal	79 days	1984-06-30 to 1984-09-17	One majority government: 1984	Turner served one short term as prime minister. He had come in third in the 1968 Liberal leadership convention, which Pierre Trudeau won, and had served from 1968 to 1975 in Trudeau's cabinet. When Trudeau announced his retirement in early 1984, Turner re-entered politics. He won the Liberal leadership and became prime minister in June 1984. He called an election shortly afterwards, which he lost in a landslide to Brian Mulroney. He resigned as prime minister but stayed on as Liberal leader and Leader of the Opposition. After he lost the 1988 general election to Mulroney, he retired from politics. Turner is one of two prime ministers who never sat in Parliament as prime minister, the other being Tupper.
24	Sir Charles Tupper	Conservative	68 days	1896-05-01 to 1896-07-08	One majority government: 1896	Tupper served the shortest term of any Canadian prime minister, only 68 days. Prime Minister Bowell resigned after a cabinet revolt over his handling of the Manitoba Schools Question. Tupper, with the support of the Cabinet, was appointed prime minister by the governor general, the Earl of Aberdeen. Tupper was the fourth and last prime minister to lead the Conservative government during the same 7th Canadian Parliament, with Macdonald's death in 1891 followed by a series of three appointees to the position. He led the Conservatives into the 1896 election, which they lost to Laurier's Liberals. He resigned as prime minister but stayed on as leader of the Conservative party and Leader of the Opposition. He was defeated by Laurier in the 1900 election and retired from politics. He was one of two prime ministers who never sat in Parliament while he was prime minister, the other being Turner.

Explanatory notes

Footnotes

== Political parties by time in office ==
By cabinet party
Party	Time in office (days)	#	Ministries
Liberal Party of Canada	34,399	14	2nd, 8th, 12th, 14th, 16th, 17th, 19th, 20th, 22nd, 23rd, 26th, 27th, 29th, and 30th
Historical conservative parties	19,233	14	1st, 3rd, 4th, 5th, 6th, 7th, 9th, 11th, 13th, 15th, 18th, 21st, 24th, and 25th
Conservative Party of Canada	3,559	1	28th
Unionist coalition	1,003	1	10th

By prime minister's party
Party	Time in office (days)	#	Name(s)
Liberal Party of Canada	34,399	11	Mark Carney, Jean Chrétien, William Lyon Mackenzie King, Louis St. Laurent, Wilfrid Laurier, Alexander Mackenzie, Paul Martin, Lester B. Pearson, Justin Trudeau, Pierre Trudeau, and John Turner
Liberal-Conservative Party	8,202	3	John Abbott, John A. Macdonald, and John Sparrow David Thompson
Progressive Conservative Party of Canada	5,743	4	Kim Campbell, Joe Clark, John Diefenbaker, and Brian Mulroney
Conservative Party of Canada (1867–1942)	4,750	5	R. B. Bennett, Robert Borden (1911–1917), Mackenzie Bowell, Arthur Meighen (1926), and Charles Tupper
Conservative Party of Canada (2003–present)	3,559	1	Stephen Harper
Unionist Party	1,003	1	Robert Borden (1917–1920)
National Liberal and Conservative Party	538	1	Arthur Meighen (1920–1921)

== See also ==
- List of prime ministers of Canada
- List of Canadian ministries
- List of prime ministers of Australia by time in office
- List of prime ministers of the United Kingdom by length of tenure

== Bibliography ==
- Forsey, Eugene A., How Canadians Govern Themselves (8th ed.), (Ottawa: Library of Parliament, 2012).
- Hutchinson, Bruce, Mr Prime Minister 1867–1964 (Don Mills: Longmans Canada Ltd., 1964).
