= List of Canadian ministries =

This is a list of Canadian ministries, the collective body of ministers of the Crown that advises the Canadian monarch—presently King Charles III—on how to exercise their Crown prerogatives. Since Canadian Confederation, July 1, 1867, there have been 30 ministries.

In Canada, a ministry is formed when a new prime minister is appointed and dissolved when that individual leaves office. The one exception occurred in 1917, when the incumbent prime minister, Sir Robert Borden, formed a new national unity government (the 10th Canadian Ministry) as a wartime coalition composed primarily of members of his own Conservative Party with some individual Liberal Party members of parliament.

In contrast to various other Commonwealth realms (such as Australia and the United Kingdom) where a "new" ministry is considered to have been formed after every general election regardless of the winner, elections in Canada do not cause dissolution of the ministry unless they result in the government's defeat. As such, the current 30th Ministry, chaired by Prime Minister Mark Carney, began governing shortly before the dissolution of the 44th Parliament in 2025.

With a duration of 15 years, 87 days, the 8th Ministry, under the leadership of Sir Wilfrid Laurier, was the lengthiest; the 68-day-long 7th Ministry, under the leadership of Sir Charles Tupper, was the briefest. William Lyon Mackenzie King led three ministries—the 12th, 14th, and 16th—the most for any Canadian prime minister.

== Ministries ==
Ministry	Dates	Prime Minister	Governing party	Duration	Monarch
1st Canadian Ministry	July 1, 1867 – November 5, 1873	John A. Macdonald	Liberal-Conservative	6 years, 127 days	Victoria
2nd Canadian Ministry	November 7, 1873 – October 8, 1878	Alexander Mackenzie	Liberal	4 years, 335 days	Victoria
3rd Canadian Ministry	October 17, 1878 – June 6, 1891	John A. Macdonald	Liberal-Conservative	12 years, 232 days	Victoria
4th Canadian Ministry	June 16, 1891 – November 24, 1892	John Abbott	Liberal-Conservative	1 year, 161 days	Victoria
5th Canadian Ministry	December 5, 1892 – December 12, 1894	John Sparrow David Thompson	Liberal-Conservative	2 years, 7 days	Victoria
6th Canadian Ministry	December 21, 1894 – April 27, 1896	Mackenzie Bowell	Conservative (Historical)	1 year, 128 days	Victoria
7th Canadian Ministry	May 1, 1896 – July 8, 1896	Charles Tupper	Conservative (Historical)	68 days	Victoria
8th Canadian Ministry	July 11, 1896 – October 6, 1911	Wilfrid Laurier	Liberal	15 years, 87 days	Victoria; Edward VII; George V
9th Canadian Ministry	October 10, 1911 – October 11, 1917	Robert Laird Borden	Conservative (Historical)	6 years, 1 day	George V
10th Canadian Ministry	October 12, 1917 – July 10, 1920	Robert Laird Borden	Unionist	2 years, 272 days	George V
11th Canadian Ministry	July 10, 1920 – December 29, 1921	Arthur Meighen	Nat'l Liberal & Conservative	1 year, 172 days	George V
12th Canadian Ministry	December 29, 1921 – June 28, 1926	William Lyon Mackenzie King	Liberal	4 years, 303 days	George V
13th Canadian Ministry	June 29, 1926 – September 25, 1926	Arthur Meighen	Conservative (Historical)	88 days	George V
14th Canadian Ministry	September 25, 1926 – August 7, 1930	William Lyon Mackenzie King	Liberal	3 years, 316 days	George V
15th Canadian Ministry	August 7, 1930 – October 23, 1935	Richard Bedford Bennett	Conservative (Historical)	5 years, 77 days	George V
16th Canadian Ministry	October 23, 1935 – November 15, 1948	William Lyon Mackenzie King	Liberal	13 years, 23 days	George V Edward VIII; George VI
17th Canadian Ministry	November 15, 1948 – June 21, 1957	Louis St. Laurent	Liberal	8 years, 218 days	George VI; Elizabeth II
18th Canadian Ministry	June 21, 1957 – April 22, 1963	John Diefenbaker	Progressive Conservative	5 years, 305 days	Elizabeth II
19th Canadian Ministry	April 22, 1963 – April 20, 1968	Lester B. Pearson	Liberal	4 years, 364 days	Elizabeth II
20th Canadian Ministry	April 20, 1968 – June 4, 1979	Pierre Trudeau	Liberal	11 years, 45 days	Elizabeth II
21st Canadian Ministry	June 4, 1979 – March 3, 1980	Joe Clark	Progressive Conservative	273 days	Elizabeth II
22nd Canadian Ministry	March 3, 1980 – June 30, 1984	Pierre Trudeau	Liberal	4 years, 119 days	Elizabeth II
23rd Canadian Ministry	June 30, 1984 – September 17, 1984	John Turner	Liberal	79 days	Elizabeth II
24th Canadian Ministry	September 17, 1984 – June 25, 1993	Brian Mulroney	Progressive Conservative	8 years, 281 days	Elizabeth II
25th Canadian Ministry	June 25, 1993 – November 4, 1993	Kim Campbell	Progressive Conservative	132 days	Elizabeth II
26th Canadian Ministry	November 4, 1993 – December 12, 2003	Jean Chrétien	Liberal	10 years, 38 days	Elizabeth II
27th Canadian Ministry	December 12, 2003 – February 6, 2006	Paul Martin	Liberal	2 years, 56 days	Elizabeth II
28th Canadian Ministry	February 6, 2006 – November 4, 2015	Stephen Harper	Conservative	9 years, 271 days	Elizabeth II
29th Canadian Ministry	November 4, 2015 – March 14, 2025	Justin Trudeau	Liberal	9 years, 130 days	Elizabeth II; Charles III
30th Canadian Ministry	March 14, 2025 – present	Mark Carney	Liberal	326 days	Charles III

== See also ==
- List of Canadian federal parliaments
- List of prime ministers of Canada
