= Minister of National Revenue =

Canadian Cabinet member

- Ministre du Revenu national
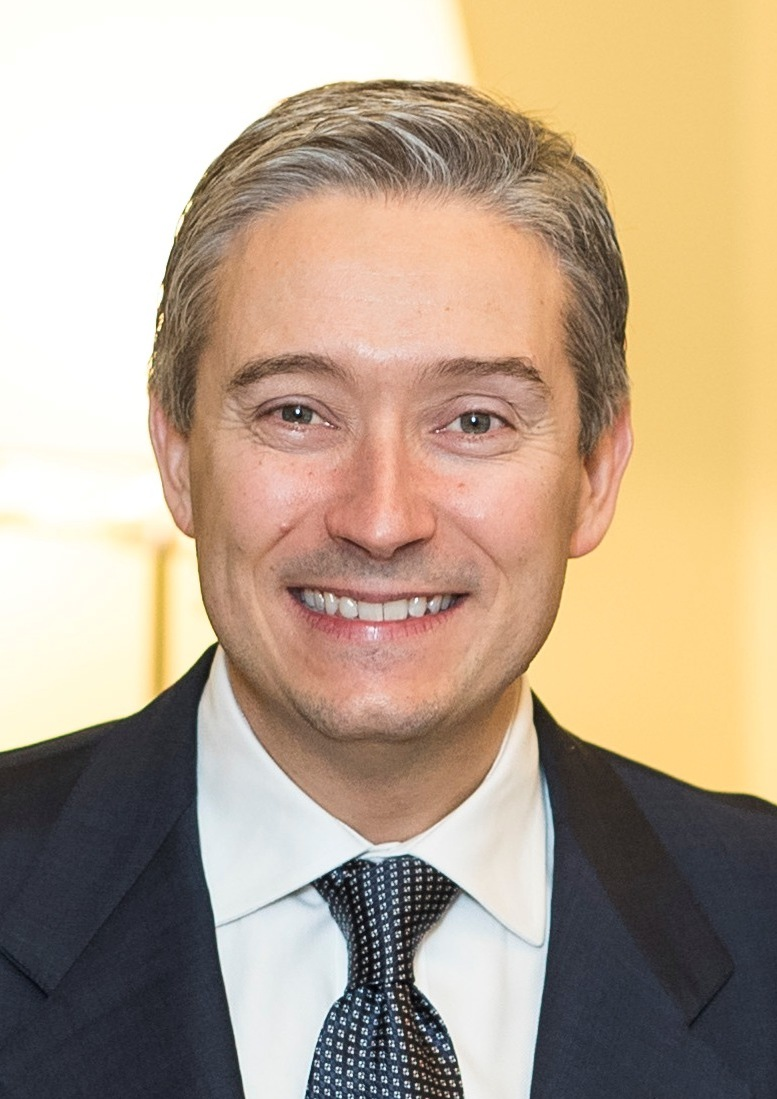
- Incumbent; François-Philippe Champagne since May 13, 2025
- Canada Revenue Agency
- Style: The Honourable
- Member of: Parliament; Privy Council; Cabinet
- Reports to: Parliament; Prime Minister
- Appointer: Monarch (represented by the governor general); on the advice of the prime minister
- Term length: At His Majesty's pleasure
- Inaugural holder: William Daum Euler
- Formation: March 21, 1927
- Salary: CA$299,900 (2024)
- Website: canada.ca/revenue-agency

The minister of national revenue (French: ministre du revenu national) is the minister of the Crown responsible for the Canada Revenue Agency (CRA). The role is currently styled Minister of Finance and National Revenue (French: Ministre des Finances et du Revenu national).

François-Philippe Champagne has been Minister of National Revenue since May 13, 2025. He concurrently serves as the minister of finance.

== History ==
The responsibility for collecting taxes was first assigned to the minister of inland revenue, formed in 1867. Between 1892 and 1897, during the 7th Canadian Parliament, the portfolio was considered to be only of the ministry, but not the Cabinet, and was thus referred to as the controller of inland revenue during that time. The minister of inland revenue title returned after 1897 and remained until the office was formally abolished.

In 1918, the offices of the minister of inland revenue and the minister of customs were combined into a new position, the minister of customs and inland revenue. In 1921, the minister of customs and inland revenue was replaced by the minister of customs and excise by Statute 11-12 Geo. V, c. 26, which assented to on 4 June 1921.

On March 31, 1927, the position of minister of customs and excise was abolished and replaced by the present minister of national revenue. The new National Revenue department was established by expanding the former Department of Customs and Excise with a new facility for the collection of income tax, which had formerly been the responsibility of the Department of Finance. The department became known as Revenue Canada during the 1970s, and subsequently became the Canada Customs and Revenue Agency (CCRA) in 1999. In 2003, the CCRA was split into the Canada Revenue Agency and the Canada Border Services Agency (CBSA), the latter falling under the public safety and emergency preparedness portfolio.

On March 14, 2025, at the start of the 30th Canadian Ministry, the position was renamed the minister responsible for the Canada Revenue Agency, before finance minister François-Philippe Champagne was appointed to the role as the minister of finance and national revenue on May 13, 2025.

== List of ministers ==
Key:

Liberal Party of Canada
Conservative Party of Canada
Historical conservative parties

No.	Portrait	Name	Term of office		Political party	Ministry
Minister of National Revenue
1		William Daum Euler	March 21, 1927	August 7, 1930	Liberal	14 (King)
2		Edmond Baird Ryckman	August 7, 1930	December 1, 1933	Conservative	15 (Bennett)
3		Robert Charles Matthews	December 6, 1933	August 13, 1935	Conservative	15 (Bennett)
4		Earl Lawson	August 14, 1935	October 23, 1935	Conservative	15 (Bennett)
5		James Lorimer Ilsley	October 24, 1935	July 7, 1940	Liberal	16 (King)
6		Colin William George Gibson	July 8, 1940	March 7, 1945	Liberal	16 (King)
-		James Angus MacKinnon (Acting)	March 8, 1945	April 18, 1945	Liberal	16 (King)
7		David Laurence MacLaren	April 19, 1945	July 29, 1945	Liberal	16 (King)
-		James Angus MacKinnon (Acting)	July 30, 1945	August 28, 1945	Liberal	16 (King)
8		James Joseph McCann	August 29, 1945	November 15, 1948	Liberal	16 (King)
8		James Joseph McCann	November 15, 1948	June 20, 1957	Liberal	17 (St-Laurent)
9		George Clyde Nowlan	June 21, 1957	August 8, 1962	Progressive Conservative	18 (Diefenbaker)
10		Hugh John Flemming	April 9, 1962	April 21, 1963	Progressive Conservative	18 (Diefenbaker)
11		Jack Garland	April 22, 1963	March 14, 1964	Liberal	19 (Pearson)
-		George McIlraith (Acting)	March 19, 1964	June 28, 1964	Liberal	19 (Pearson)
12		Edgar Benson	June 29, 1964	January 17, 1968	Liberal	19 (Pearson)
13		Jean Chrétien	January 18, 1968	April 20, 1968	Liberal	19 (Pearson)
13		Jean Chrétien	April 20, 1968	July 5, 1968	Liberal	20 (P.E. Trudeau)
14		Joseph Julien Jean-Pierre Côté	July 6, 1968	September 23, 1970	Liberal	20 (P.E. Trudeau)
15		Herb Gray	September 24, 1970	November 26, 1972	Liberal	20 (P.E. Trudeau)
16		Robert Stanbury	November 27, 1972	August 7, 1974	Liberal	20 (P.E. Trudeau)
17		Ron Basford	August 8, 1974	September 25, 1975	Liberal	20 (P.E. Trudeau)
18		Bud Cullen	September 26, 1975	September 13, 1976	Liberal	20 (P.E. Trudeau)
19		Monique Bégin	September 14, 1976	September 15, 1977	Liberal	20 (P.E. Trudeau)
20		Joseph-Philippe Guay	September 16, 1977	November 23, 1978	Liberal	20 (P.E. Trudeau)
21		Tony Abbott	November 24, 1978	June 3, 1979	Liberal	20 (P.E. Trudeau)
22		Walter Baker	June 4, 1979	March 2, 1980	Progressive Conservative	21 (Clark)
23		Bill Rompkey	March 3, 1980	September 29, 1982	Liberal	22 (P.E. Trudeau)
24		Pierre Bussières	September 30, 1982	June 29, 1984	Liberal	22 (P.E. Trudeau)
25		Roy MacLaren	June 30, 1984	September 16, 1984	Liberal	23 (Turner)
26		Perrin Beatty	September 17, 1984	August 19, 1985	Progressive Conservative	24 (Mulroney)
27		Elmer MacKay	August 20, 1985	January 29, 1989	Progressive Conservative	24 (Mulroney)
28		Otto Jelinek	January 30, 1989	June 24, 1993	Progressive Conservative	24 (Mulroney)
29		Garth Turner	June 25, 1993	November 3, 1993	Progressive Conservative	25 (Campbell)
30		David Anderson	November 4, 1993	January 24, 1996	Liberal	26 (Chrétien)
31		Jane Stewart	January 25, 1996	June 10, 1997	Liberal	26 (Chrétien)
32		Herb Dhaliwal	June 11, 1997	August 2, 1999	Liberal	26 (Chrétien)
33		Martin Cauchon	August 3, 1999	January 14, 2002	Liberal	26 (Chrétien)
34		Elinor Caplan	January 15, 2002	December 11, 2003	Liberal	26 (Chrétien)
35		Stan Keyes	December 12, 2003	July 19, 2004	Liberal	27 (Martin)
36		John McCallum	July 20, 2004	February 5, 2006	Liberal	27 (Martin)
37		Carol Skelton	February 6, 2006	August 14, 2007	Conservative	28 (Harper)
38		Gordon O'Connor	August 14, 2007	October 29, 2008	Conservative	28 (Harper)
39		Jean-Pierre Blackburn	October 30, 2008	January 19, 2010	Conservative	28 (Harper)
40		Keith Ashfield	January 19, 2010	May 18, 2011	Conservative	28 (Harper)
41		Gail Shea	May 18, 2011	July 15, 2013	Conservative	28 (Harper)
42		Kerry-Lynne Findlay	July 15, 2013	November 4, 2015	Conservative	28 (Harper)
43		Diane Lebouthillier	November 4, 2015	July 26, 2023	Liberal	29 (J. Trudeau)
44		Marie-Claude Bibeau	July 26, 2023	December 20, 2024	Liberal	29 (J. Trudeau)
45		Élisabeth Brière	December 20, 2024	March 14, 2025	Liberal	29 (J. Trudeau)
Minister responsible for the Canada Revenue Agency
(45)		Élisabeth Brière	March 14, 2025	May 12, 2025	Liberal	30 (Carney)
Minister of National Revenue
46		François-Philippe Champagne	May 13, 2025	Incumbent	Liberal	30 (Carney)

== Predecessors ==
=== Minister of Inland Revenue ===
Minister	From	To	Ministry	Description
Minister of Inland Revenue
William Pearce Howland	1 July 1867	14 July 1868	1st (Macdonald)	
Alexander Campbell, Senator (acting)	15 July 1868	15 November 1869	1st (Macdonald)	
Alexander Morris	16 November 1869	1 July 1872	1st (Macdonald)	
Charles Tupper	2 July 1872	3 March 1873	1st (Macdonald)	Concurrently served as Minister of Customs
John O'Connor	4 March 1873	30 June 1873	1st (Macdonald)	O'Connor was appointed Postmaster General on 1 July 1873.
Thomas Nicholson Gibbs	1 July 1873	5 November 1873	1st (Macdonald)	
Télesphore Fournier	7 November 1873	7 July 1874	2nd (Mackenzie)	Fournier was appointed Minister of Justice and Attorney General (AG) on 3 July 1874.
Félix Geoffrion	8 July 1874	8 November 1876	2nd (Mackenzie)	
Toussaint Antoine Rodolphe Laflamme	9 November 1876	7 June 1877	2nd (Mackenzie)	Laflamme was appointed Minister of Justice and AG on 8 June 1877
Joseph-Édouard Cauchon	8 June 1877	7 October 1877	2nd (Mackenzie)	
Wilfrid Laurier	8 October 1877	8 October 1878	2nd (Mackenzie)	
vacant	17 October 1878	25 October 1878	3rd (Macdonald)	
Louis François Georges Baby	26 October 1878	28 October 1880	3rd (Macdonald)	
vacant	29 October 1880	7 November 1880	3rd (Macdonald)	
James Cox Aikins, Senator	8 November 1880	22 May 1882	3rd (Macdonald)	
John Costigan	23 May 1882	24 November 1892	3rd (Macdonald)	
John Costigan	23 May 1882	24 November 1892	4th (Abbott)	
Controller of Inland Revenue
John Fisher Wood	5 December 1892	16 December 1895	5th (Thompson)	
John Fisher Wood	5 December 1892	16 December 1895	6th (Bowell)	
Edward Gawler Prior	17 December 1895	8 July 1896	6th (Bowell)	
Edward Gawler Prior	17 December 1895	8 July 1896	7th (Tupper)	
Henri-Gustave Joly de Lotbinière	13 July 1896	29 June 1897	8th (Laurier)	Joly was not in cabinet until 29 June 1897, thereafter Minister of Inland Revenue
Minister of Inland Revenue
Henri-Gustave Joly de Lotbinière	29 June 1897	21 June 1900	8th	
Michel Esdras Bernier	22 June 1900	18 January 1904	8th	
Louis-Philippe Brodeur	19 January 1904	5 February 1906	8th	
William Templeman	6 February 1906	6 October 1911	8th	
Wilfrid Bruno Nantel	10 October 1911	19 October 1914	9th (Borden)	
Pierre-Édouard Blondin	20 October 1914	5 October 1915	9th (Borden)	
Esioff-Léon Patenaude	6 October 1915	7 January 1917	9th (Borden)	
Albert Sévigny	8 January 1917	1 April 1918	9th (Borden)	
Albert Sévigny	8 January 1917	1 April 1918	10th (Borden)	
vacant	2 April 1918	13 May 1918	10th	
Arthur Lewis Sifton	14 May 1918	17 May 1918	10th	Sifton was also Minister of Customs, and was appointed Minister of Customs and Inland Revenue on May 18, 1918.

=== Minister of Customs and Inland Revenue ===
No.	Minister	Term	Ministry
Minister of Customs and Inland Revenue
1.	Arthur Lewis Sifton	May 18, 1918 – September 1, 1919	Cabinet of Borden
2.	John Dowsley Reid (acting)	September 2, 1919 – December 30, 1919	Cabinet of Borden
3.	Martin Burrell	December 31, 1919 – July 7, 1920	Cabinet of Borden
	vacant	July 8, 1920 – July 10, 1920	Cabinet of Borden
4.	Rupert Wilson Wigmore	July 13, 1920 – June 3, 1921	Cabinet of Meighen
Minister of Customs and Excise
1.	Rupert Wilson Wigmore	June 4, 1921 – September 20, 1921	Cabinet of Meighen
2.	John Babington Macaulay Baxter	September 21, 1921 – December 29, 1921	Cabinet of Meighen
3.	Jacques Bureau	December 29, 1921 – September 4, 1925	Cabinet of King
4.	Georges-Henri Boivin	September 5, 1925 – June 28, 1926	Cabinet of King
5.	Henry Herbert Stevens (acting until July 12)	June 29, 1926 – September 25, 1926	Cabinet of Meighen
6.	William Daum Euler	September 25, 1926 – March 30, 1927	Cabinet of King

== See also ==
- Taxation in Canada
- Government revenue
- Revenue service
