= Minister of the Interior (Canada) =

Former Canadian government post

Minister of the Interior of Canada
- Member of: Cabinet of Canada
- Precursor: Secretary of State for the Provinces
- Formation: July 1, 1873
- First holder: Alexander Campbell
- Final holder: Thomas Crerar
- Abolished: November 30, 1936

The minister of the interior was the member of the Canadian Cabinet who oversaw the Department of the Interior, which was responsible for federal land management, immigration, Indian affairs, and natural-resources extraction.

The position was created in 1873 by Statute 36 Victoria, c. 4, to replace the Secretary of State for the Provinces. The Act designated the Minister as ex officio the Superintendent-General of Indian Affairs. From 30 March 1912 to 9 February 1913, and from 31 December 1919 to 6 August 1930, the Minister of the Interior was also designated ex officio the Minister of Mines.

In 1917 the responsibility for passports was transferred to the Minister of Immigration and Colonization.

It was superseded in 1936 by the Minister responsible for Indian Affairs and Minister of Mines and Resources.

== Ministers ==
Key:

Liberal Party of Canada
Historical conservative parties: Liberal-Conservative, Conservative (historical), Unionist, National Liberal and Conservative, Progressive Conservative

No.	Portrait	Name	Term of office		Political party	Ministry
1		Alexander Campbell	July 1, 1873	November 5, 1873	Liberal-Conservative	1 (Macdonald)
2		David Laird	November 7, 1873	October 6, 1876	Liberal	2 (Mackenzie)
–		Richard William Scott (Acting)	October 7, 1876	October 23, 1876	Liberal	2 (Mackenzie)
3		David Mills	October 24, 1876	October 8, 1878	Liberal	2 (Mackenzie)
4		John A. Macdonald	October 17, 1878	October 2, 1887	Liberal-Conservative	3 (Macdonald)
5		Thomas White	October 3, 1887	April 21, 1888	Conservative	3 (Macdonald)
–		John A. Macdonald (Acting)	May 8, 1888	September 24, 1888	Liberal-Conservative	3 (Macdonald)
6		Edgar Dewdney	September 25, 1888	June 6, 1891	Conservative	3 (Macdonald)
6		Edgar Dewdney	June 16, 1891	October 16, 1892	Conservative	4 (Abbott)
7		Thomas Mayne Daly	October 17, 1892	November 24, 1892	Liberal-Conservative	4 (Abbott)
7		Thomas Mayne Daly	December 5, 1892	December 12, 1894	Liberal-Conservative	5 (Thompson)
7		Thomas Mayne Daly	December 21, 1894	April 27, 1896	Liberal-Conservative	6 (Bowell)
8		Hugh John Macdonald	May 1, 1896	July 8, 1896	Conservative (historical)	7 (Tupper)
–		Richard William Scott (Acting)	July 17, 1896	November 16, 1896	Liberal	8 (Laurier)
9		Clifford Sifton	November 17, 1896	February 28, 1905	Liberal	8 (Laurier)
–		Wilfrid Laurier (Acting)	March 13, 1905	April 7, 1905	Liberal	8 (Laurier)
10		Frank Oliver	April 8, 1905	October 6, 1911	Liberal	8 (Laurier)
11		Robert Rogers	October 10, 1911	October 28, 1912	Conservative	9 (Borden)
12		William James Roche	October 29, 1912	October 12, 1917	Conservative	9 (Borden)
13		Arthur Meighen	October 12, 1917	July 10, 1920	Unionist	10 (Borden)
14		James Alexander Lougheed	July 10, 1920	December 29, 1921	National Liberal and Conservative	11 (Meighen)
15		Charles Stewart (First time)	December 29, 1921	June 28, 1926	Liberal	12 (King)
–		Henry Herbert Stevens (Acting)	June 29, 1926	July 12, 1926	Conservative	13 (Meighen)
–		Richard Bedford Bennett (Acting)	July 13, 1926	September 24, 1926	Conservative	13 (Meighen)
(15)		Charles Stewart (Second time)	September 25, 1926	August 6, 1930	Liberal	14 (King)
16		Thomas Gerow Murphy	August 7, 1930	October 23, 1935	Conservative	15 (Bennett)
17		Thomas Crerar	October 23, 1935	November 30, 1936	Liberal	16 (King)

== See also ==
- Secretary of State for the Provinces - post preceding the Minister of Interior
- Secretary of State for Canada
