= Minister of Customs =

The Minister of Customs was a position in the Cabinet of the Government of Canada responsible for the administration of customs revenue collection in Canada. This position was originally created by Statute 31 Vict., c. 43, and assented to on 22 May 1868.

From 3 December 1892, the Minister's position was abolished in favour of a Controller of Customs position, which was treated as part of the Ministry, but not part of the formal Cabinet. A similar change was also made to the Minister of Inland Revenue portfolio at that time. The Controller of Customs became part of the Cabinet on 24 December 1895, when John Fisher Wood joined the Privy Council.

The position once again became known as Minister of Customs with the passage of Statute 60-61 Vict., c. 18, which was given royal assent on 29 June 1897. (The same legislation also brought back the title of Minister of Inland Revenue.)

On 18 May 1918, the offices of Minister of Customs and Minister of Inland Revenue were combined into the Minister of Customs and Inland Revenue, as mandated by Order in Council.

== Ministers and Controllers of Customs ==
No.	Minister	From	To	Political Party	Ministry	Notes
Minister of Customs
1	Samuel Leonard Tilley	1 July 1867	21 February 1873	Liberal -Conservative	1 (Macdonald)	
2	Charles Tupper	22 February 1873	5 November 1873	Conservative	1 (Macdonald)	
3	Isaac Burpee	7 November 1873	8 October 1878	Liberal	2 (Mackenzie)	
4	Mackenzie Bowell	19 October 1878	6 June 1891	Conservative	3 (Macdonald)	
4	Mackenzie Bowell	16 June 1892	24 January 1892	Conservative	4 (Abbott)	
5	Joseph-Adolphe Chapleau	25 January 1892	24 November 1892	Conservative	4 (Abbott)	
Controller of Customs (Not of the Cabinet)
6	Nathaniel Clarke Wallace	5 December 1892	12 December 1894	Conservative	5 (Thompson)	
6	Nathaniel Clarke Wallace	21 December 1894	13 December 1895	Conservative	6 (Bowell)	
7	John Fisher Wood	14 December 1895	23 December 1895	Liberal-Conservative	6 (Bowell)	Wood was interim Controller until his appointment was official on 17 December 1895.
Controller of Customs (Cabinet)
(7)	John Fisher Wood	24 December 1895	5 January 1896	Liberal-Conservative	6 (Bowell)	
--	Frank Smith (acting)	6 January 1896	14 January 1896	Conservative	6 (Bowell)	
(7)	John Fisher Wood	15 January 1896	27 April 1896	Liberal-Conservative	6 (Bowell)	
(7)	John Fisher Wood	1 May 1896	8 July 1896	Liberal-Conservative	7 (Tupper)	
Controller of Customs (Not of the Cabinet)
8	William Paterson	13 July 1896	29 Jun 1897	Liberal	8 (Laurier)	
Minister of Customs
(8)	William Paterson	30 June 1897	6 October 1911	Liberal	8 (Laurier)	
9	John Dowsley Reid	10 October 1911	12 October 1917	Conservative	9 (Borden)	
10	Arthur Lewis Sifton	12 October 1917	17 May 1918	Unionist	10 (Borden)	Sifton also held the Inland Revenue post. On 18 May 1918, the ministries were combined and Sifton continued as Minister of Customs and Inland Revenue.

== Sources ==
- Privy Council Office (Canada) - Guide to Canadian Ministries since Confederation
- Parliament of Canada - Department and Roles: 1867 - Today
