= Secretary of State for Canada =

Cabinet position (1867–1996)

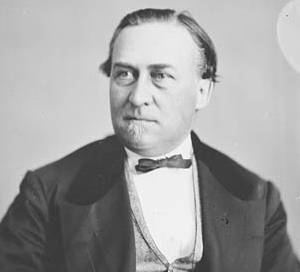
- Sir Hector-Louis Langevin, first secretary of state for Canada
- Member of: Cabinet of Canada
- Formation: July 1, 1867
- First holder: Hector-Louis Langevin
- Final holder: Lucienne Robillard
- Abolished: July 12, 1996

The secretary of state for Canada, established in 1867 with a corresponding department, was a Canadian Cabinet position that served as the official channel of communication between Canada and the British government in London.

As Canada became increasingly independent after World War I, and particularly with the passage of the Statute of Westminster in 1931, this role fell into disuse. The department was maintained, however, and was used to administer various aspects of government that did not have their own ministry. Accordingly, the secretary of state for Canada was Registrar General of Canada, responsible as such for the Great Seal of Canada and various functions of state associated with it.

At various times the secretary of state for Canada was responsible for the Royal Canadian Mounted Police, the civil service, the Queen's Printer for Canada, administration of Crown lands, and governance of Canadian Indians (as they were called at the time), as well as various ceremonial and state duties. Generally, any government role and responsibility which was not specifically assigned to a cabinet minister would be the de facto responsibility of the secretary of state.

The department was eliminated in 1993 when the government was reorganized; however, the position of secretary of state for Canada was not legally eliminated until 1996 when its remaining responsibilities were assigned to other cabinet positions and departments, particularly the newly created Minister of Canadian Heritage position.

The position of secretary of state for Canada had no relation to that of secretary of state for external affairs except for the period from 1909 until 1912 when (Charles Murphy under Sir Wilfrid Laurier, and William James Roche under Sir Robert Borden) were responsible for the newly created Department of External Affairs.

== Secretaries of state for Canada ==
Legend
Liberal Party of Canada
Historical conservative parties: Liberal-Conservative, Conservative (historical), Unionist, National Liberal and Conservative, Progressive Conservative

No.	Portrait	Name	Term of office		Political party	Ministry
1		Sir Hector-Louis Langevin	July 1, 1867	December 8, 1869	Liberal-Conservative	1 (Macdonald)
2		James Cox Aikins	December 8, 1869	November 5, 1873	Liberal-Conservative	1 (Macdonald)
3		David Christie	November 7, 1873	January 8, 1874	Liberal	2 (Mackenzie)
4		Sir Richard William Scott	January 9, 1874	October 8, 1878	Liberal	2 (Mackenzie)
(2)		James Cox Aikins	October 19, 1878	November 7, 1880	Conservative	3 (Macdonald)
5		John O'Connor	November 8, 1880	May 19, 1881	Conservative	3 (Macdonald)
6		Joseph-Alfred Mousseau	May 20, 1881	July 28, 1882	Conservative	3 (Macdonald)
7		Sir Joseph-Adolphe Chapleau	July 29, 1882	June 6, 1891	Conservative	3 (Macdonald)
7		Sir Joseph-Adolphe Chapleau	June 16, 1891	January 24, 1892	Conservative	4 (Abbott)
8		James Colebrooke Patterson	January 25, 1892	November 24, 1892	Conservative	4 (Abbott)
9		John Costigan	December 5, 1892	December 12, 1894	Conservative	5 (Thompson)
10		Arthur Rupert Dickey	December 21, 1894	March 25, 1895	Conservative	6 (Bowell)
11		Walter Humphries Montague	March 26, 1895	December 20, 1895	Conservative	6 (Bowell)
–		Joseph-Aldric Ouimet (Acting)	December 21, 1895	January 5, 1896	Conservative	6 (Bowell)
–		Thomas Mayne Daly (Acting)	January 6, 1896	January 14, 1896	Conservative	6 (Bowell)
12		Sir Charles Tupper	January 15, 1896	April 27, 1896	Conservative	6 (Bowell)
12		Sir Charles Tupper	May 1, 1896	July 8, 1896	Conservative	7 (Tupper)
(4)		Sir Richard William Scott	July 13, 1896	October 8, 1908	Liberal	8 (Laurier)
13		Charles Murphy	October 9, 1908	October 6, 1911	Liberal	8 (Laurier)
14		William James Roche	October 10, 1911	October 28, 1912	Conservative	9 (Borden)
15		Louis Coderre	October 29, 1912	October 5, 1915	Conservative	9 (Borden)
16		Pierre Édouard Blondin	October 6, 1915	January 7, 1917	Conservative	9 (Borden)
17		Esioff-Léon Patenaude	January 8, 1917	June 12, 1917	Conservative	9 (Borden)
–		Albert Sévigny (Acting)	June 13, 1917	August 24, 1917	Conservative	9 (Borden)
18		Arthur Meighen	August 25, 1917	October 12, 1917	Conservative	9 (Borden)
19		Martin Burrell	October 12, 1917	December 30, 1919	Unionist	10 (Borden)
20		Arthur Sifton	December 31, 1919	July 10, 1920	Unionist	10 (Borden)
20		Arthur Sifton	July 10, 1920	January 21, 1921	National Liberal and Conservative	11 (Meighen)
–		Sir Henry Lumley Drayton (Acting)	January 24, 1921	September 20, 1921	National Liberal and Conservative	11 (Meighen)
21		Rodolphe Monty	September 21, 1921	December 29, 1921	National Liberal and Conservative	11 (Meighen)
22		Arthur Bliss Copp	December 29, 1921	September 24, 1925	Liberal	12 (King)
23		Walter Edward Foster	September 26, 1925	November 12, 1925	Liberal	12 (King)
–		Charles Murphy (Acting)	November 13, 1925	March 23, 1926	Liberal	12 (King)
–		Ernest Lapointe (Acting)	March 24, 1926	June 28, 1926	Liberal	12 (King)
24		George Halsey Perley	June 29, 1926	September 25, 1926	Conservative	13 (Meighen)
25		Fernand Rinfret	September 25, 1926	August 7, 1930	Liberal	14 (King)
26		Charles Cahan	August 7, 1930	October 23, 1935	Conservative	15 (Bennett)
(25)		Fernand Rinfret	October 23, 1935	July 12, 1939	Liberal	16 (King)
–		Ernest Lapointe (Acting - Second time)	July 26, 1939	May 8, 1940	Liberal	16 (King)
27		Pierre-François Casgrain	May 9, 1940	December 14, 1941	Liberal	16 (King)
28		Norman Alexander McLarty	December 15, 1941	April 17, 1945	Liberal	16 (King)
29		Paul Martin Sr.	April 18, 1945	December 11, 1946	Liberal	16 (King)
30		Colin W. G. Gibson	December 12, 1946	November 15, 1948	Liberal	16 (King)
30		Colin W. G. Gibson	November 15, 1948	March 31, 1949	Liberal	17 (St. Laurent)
31		Frederick Gordon Bradley	March 31, 1949	June 11, 1953	Liberal	17 (St. Laurent)
32		Jack Pickersgill	June 11, 1953	June 30, 1954	Liberal	17 (St. Laurent)
33		Roch Pinard	July 1, 1954	June 21, 1957	Liberal	17 (St. Laurent)
34		Ellen Fairclough	June 21, 1957	May 11, 1958	Progressive Conservative	18 (Diefenbaker)
35		Henri Courtemanche	May 12, 1958	June 19, 1960	Progressive Conservative	18 (Diefenbaker)
–		Léon Balcer (Acting)	June 21, 1960	October 10, 1960	Progressive Conservative	18 (Diefenbaker)
36		Noël Dorion	October 11, 1960	July 5, 1962	Progressive Conservative	18 (Diefenbaker)
–		Léon Balcer (Acting - Second time)	July 11, 1962	August 8, 1962	Progressive Conservative	18 (Diefenbaker)
37		Ernest Halpenny	August 9, 1962	April 22, 1963	Progressive Conservative	18 (Diefenbaker)
(32)		Jack Pickersgill	April 22, 1963	February 2, 1964	Liberal	19 (Pearson)
38		Maurice Lamontagne	February 2, 1964	December 17, 1965	Liberal	19 (Pearson)
39		Judy LaMarsh	December 17, 1965	April 9, 1968	Liberal	19 (Pearson)
–		John Joseph Connolly (Acting)	April 10, 1968	April 20, 1968	Liberal	19 (Pearson)
40		Jean Marchand	April 20, 1968	July 5, 1968	Liberal	20 (P. E. Trudeau)
41		Gérard Pelletier	July 5, 1968	November 26, 1972	Liberal	20 (P. E. Trudeau)
42		Hugh Faulkner	November 27, 1972	September 13, 1976	Liberal	20 (P. E. Trudeau)
43		John Roberts	September 14, 1976	June 3, 1979	Liberal	20 (P. E. Trudeau)
44		David MacDonald	June 4, 1979	March 2, 1980	Progressive Conservative	21 (Clark)
45		Francis Fox	March 3, 1980	September 21, 1981	Liberal	22 (P. E. Trudeau)
46		Gerald Regan	September 22, 1981	October 5, 1982	Liberal	22 (P. E. Trudeau)
47		Serge Joyal	October 6, 1982	June 29, 1984	Liberal	22 (P. E. Trudeau)
47		Serge Joyal	June 30, 1984	September 16, 1984	Liberal	23 (Turner)
48		Walter McLean	September 17, 1984	April 19, 1985	Progressive Conservative	24 (Mulroney)
49		Benoît Bouchard	April 20, 1985	June 29, 1986	Progressive Conservative	24 (Mulroney)
50		David Crombie	June 30, 1986	March 30, 1988	Progressive Conservative	24 (Mulroney)
51		Lucien Bouchard	March 31, 1988	January 29, 1989	Progressive Conservative	24 (Mulroney)
52		Gerry Weiner	January 30, 1989	April 20, 1991	Progressive Conservative	24 (Mulroney)
53		Robert de Cotret	April 21, 1991	January 3, 1993	Progressive Conservative	24 (Mulroney)
54		Monique Landry	January 4, 1993	June 24, 1993	Progressive Conservative	24 (Mulroney)
54		Monique Landry	June 24, 1993	November 3, 1993	Progressive Conservative	25 (Campbell)
55		Sergio Marchi	November 4, 1993	January 24, 1996	Liberal	26 (Chrétien)
56		Lucienne Robillard	January 25, 1996	July 12, 1996	Liberal	26 (Chrétien)

== See also ==
- Secretary of State for the Provinces - post preceding the minister of interior
- Minister of the Interior
