= 5th Canadian Ministry =

Government cabinet of Canada (1892–1894)

5th Canadian Ministry 5e conseil des ministres du Canada
- 5th ministry of Canada

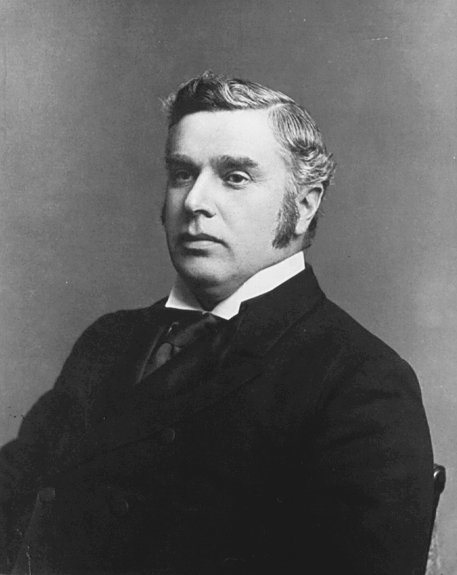
- Date formed: 5 December 1892
- Date dissolved: 12 December 1894

People and organizations
- Monarch: Victoria
- Governor General: Earl of Derby; Earl of Aberdeen
- Prime Minister: John Sparrow David Thompson
- Member party: Conservative
- Status in legislature: Majority
- Opposition party: Liberal
- Opposition leader: Wilfrid Laurier

History
- Legislature term: 7th Canadian Parliament
- Predecessor: 4th Canadian Ministry
- Successor: 6th Canadian Ministry

The Fifth Canadian Ministry was the cabinet chaired by Prime Minister Sir John Sparrow Thompson. It governed Canada from 5 December 1892 to 12 December 1894, including only two years in the middle of the 7th Canadian Parliament. The government was formed by the old Conservative Party of Canada.

== Ministers ==
- Prime Minister
  - 5 December 1892 – 12 December 1894: Sir John Sparrow David Thompson
- Minister of Agriculture
  - 5 December 1892 – 7 December 1892: Vacant (John Lowe was acting)
  - 7 December 1892 – 12 December 1894: Auguste-Réal Angers
- Minister of Finance
  - 5 December 1892 – 12 December 1894: George Eulas Foster
- Receiver General of Canada
  - 5 December 1892 – 12 December 1894: The Minister of Finance (Ex officio)
    - 5 December 1892 – 12 December 1894: George Eulas Foster
- Superintendent-General of Indian Affairs
  - 5 December 1892 – 12 December 1894: The Minister of the Interior (Ex officio)
    - 5 December 1892 – 12 December 1894: Thomas Mayne Daly
- Minister of the Interior
  - 5 December 1892 – 12 December 1894: Thomas Mayne Daly
- Minister of Justice
  - 5 December 1892 – 12 December 1894: Sir John Sparrow David Thompson
- Attorney General of Canada
  - 5 December 1892 – 12 December 1894: The Minister of Justice (Ex officio)
    - 5 December 1892 – 12 December 1894: Sir John Sparrow David Thompson
- Leader of the Government in the Senate
  - 5 December 1892 – 31 October 1893: Sir John Abbott
  - 31 October 1893 – 12 December 1894: Mackenzie Bowell
- Minister of Marine and Fisheries
  - 5 December 1892 – 12 December 1894: Sir Charles Hibbert Tupper
- Minister of Militia and Defence
  - 5 December 1892 – 12 December 1894: James Colebrooke Patterson
- Postmaster General
  - 5 December 1892 – 12 December 1894: Sir Joseph Philippe René Adolphe Caron
- President of the Privy Council
  - 5 December 1892 – 7 December 1892: Sir John Sparrow David Thompson (acting)
  - 7 December 1892 – 12 December 1894: William Bullock Ives
- Minister of Public Works
  - 5 December 1892 – 12 December 1894: Joseph-Aldric Ouimet
- Minister of Railways and Canals
  - 5 December 1892 – 12 December 1894: John Graham Haggart
- Secretary of State of Canada
  - 5 December 1892 – 12 December 1894: John Costigan
- Registrar General of Canada
  - 5 December 1892 – 12 December 1894: The Secretary of State of Canada (Ex officio)
  - 5 December 1892 – 12 December 1894: John Costigan
- Minister of Trade and Commerce
  - 5 December 1892 – 12 December 1894: Mackenzie Bowell
- Minister without Portfolio
  - 5 December 1892 – 12 December 1894: Sir John Carling
  - 5 December 1892 – 12 December 1894: Sir Frank Smith

== Offices not of the Cabinet ==
Controller of Customs

- 5 December 1892 – 12 December 1894: Nathaniel Clarke Wallace

Controller of Inland Revenue

- 5 December 1892 – 12 December 1894: John Fisher Wood

Solicitor General of Canada

- 5 December 1892 – 12 December 1894: John Joseph Curran

== Succession ==
Ministries of Canada
| Preceded by 4th Canadian Ministry | 5th Canadian Ministry; 1892–1894 | Succeeded by 6th Canadian Ministry |
