= 4th Canadian Ministry =

Government cabinet of Canada (1891–1892)

4th Canadian Ministry 4e conseil des ministres du Canada
- 4th ministry of Canada

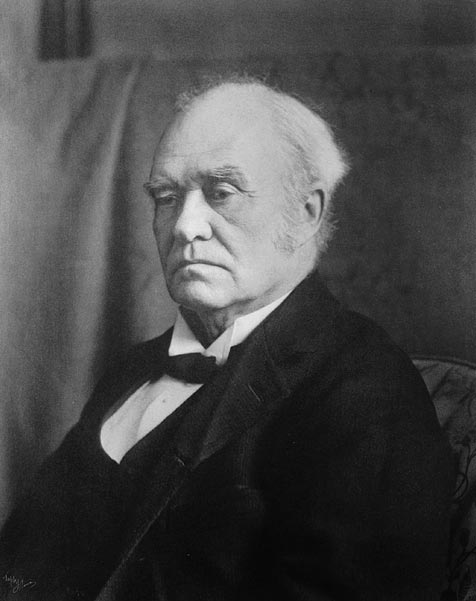
- Date formed: 16 June 1891
- Date dissolved: 24 November 1892

People and organizations
- Monarch: Victoria
- Governor General: Earl of Derby
- Prime Minister: John Abbott
- Member party: Conservative
- Status in legislature: Majority
- Opposition party: Liberal
- Opposition leader: Wilfrid Laurier

History
- Legislature term: 7th Canadian Parliament
- Predecessor: 3rd Canadian Ministry
- Successor: 5th Canadian Ministry

The Fourth Canadian Ministry was the cabinet chaired by Prime Minister Sir John Abbott. It governed Canada from 16 June 1891 to 24 November 1892, including only a year and a half in the middle of the 7th Canadian Parliament. The government was formed by the old Conservative Party of Canada.

== Ministries ==
- Prime Minister
  - 16 June 1891 – 5 December 1892: Sir John Abbott
- Minister of Agriculture
  - 16 June 1891 – 5 December 1892: John Carling
- Minister of Customs
  - 16 June 1891 – 25 January 1892: Mackenzie Bowell
  - 25 January 1892 – 5 December 1892: Joseph-Adolphe Chapleau
- Minister of Finance
  - 16 June 1891 – 5 December 1892: George Eulas Foster
- Receiver General of Canada
  - 16 June 1891 – 5 December 1892: The Minister of Finance (Ex officio)
    - 16 June 1891 – 5 December 1892: George Eulas Foster
- Superintendent-General of Indian Affairs
  - 16 June 1891 – 5 December 1892: The Minister of the Interior (Ex officio)
    - 16 June 1891 – 17 October 1892: Edgar Dewdney
    - 17 October 1892 – 5 December 1892: Thomas Mayne Daly
- Minister of Inland Revenue
  - 16 June 1891 – 5 December 1892: John Costigan
- Minister of the Interior
  - 16 June 1891 – 17 October 1892: Edgar Dewdney
  - 17 October 1892 – 5 December 1892: Thomas Mayne Daly
- Minister of Justice
  - 16 June 1891 – 5 December 1892: Sir John Sparrow David Thompson
- Attorney General of Canada
  - 16 June 1891 – 5 December 1892: The Minister of Justice (Ex officio)
    - 16 June 1891 – 5 December 1892: Sir John Sparrow David Thompson
- Leader of the Government in the Senate
  - 16 June 1891 – 5 December 1892: Sir John Abbott
- Minister of Marine and Fisheries
  - 16 June 1891 – 5 December 1892: Charles Hibbert Tupper
- Minister of Militia and Defence
  - 16 June 1891 – 25 January 1892: Sir Joseph Philippe René Adolphe Caron
  - 25 January 1892 – 5 December 1892: Mackenzie Bowell
- Postmaster General
  - 16 June 1891 – 25 January 1892: John Graham Haggart
  - 25 January 1892 – 5 December 1892: Sir Joseph Philippe René Adolphe Caron
- President of the Privy Council
  - 16 June 1891 – 5 December 1892: Sir John Abbott
- Minister of Public Works
  - 16 June 1891 – 12 August 1891 Sir Hector Louis Langevin
  - 12 August 1891 – 14 August 1891: Vacant
  - 14 August 1891 – 11 January 1892: Frank Smith
  - 11 January 1892 – 5 December 1892 Joseph-Aldric Ouimet
- Minister of Railways and Canals
  - 16 June 1891 – 17 June 1891: Vacant (Toussaint Trudeau was acting)
  - 17 June 1891 – 11 January 1892: Mackenzie Bowell (Acting)
  - 11 January 1892 – 5 December 1892: John Graham Haggart
- Secretary of State of Canada
  - 16 June 1891 – 25 January 1892: Joseph-Adolphe Chapleau
  - 25 January 1892 – 5 December 1892: James Colebrooke Patterson
- Registrar General of Canada
  - 16 June 1891 – 5 December 1892: The Secretary of State of Canada (Ex officio)
  - 16 June 1891 – 25 January 1892: Joseph-Adolphe Chapleau
  - 25 January 1892 – 5 December 1892: James Colebrooke Patterson
- Minister without Portfolio
  - 16 June 1891 – 14 August 1891: Frank Smith
  - 11 January 1892 – 5 December 1892: Frank Smith

== Succession ==
Ministries of Canada
| Preceded by 3rd Canadian Ministry | 4th Canadian Ministry; 1891–1892 | Succeeded by 5th Canadian Ministry |
