= 6th Canadian Ministry =

Government cabinet of Canada (1894–1896)

6th Canadian Ministry 6e conseil des ministres du Canada
- 6th ministry of Canada

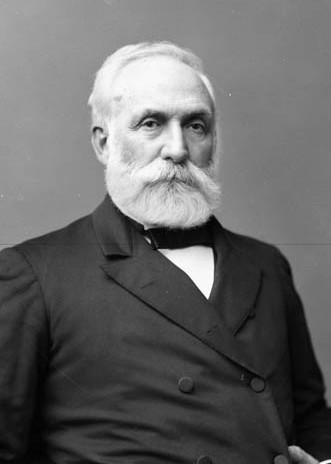
- Date formed: 21 December 1894
- Date dissolved: 27 April 1896

People and organizations
- Monarch: Victoria
- Governor General: Earl of Aberdeen
- Prime Minister: Mackenzie Bowell
- Member party: Conservative
- Status in legislature: Majority
- Opposition party: Liberal
- Opposition leader: Wilfrid Laurier

History
- Legislature term: 7th Canadian Parliament
- Predecessor: 5th Canadian Ministry
- Successor: 7th Canadian Ministry

The Sixth Canadian Ministry was the cabinet chaired by Prime Minister Sir Mackenzie Bowell. It governed Canada from 21 December 1894 to 27 April 1896, including only the last year of the 7th Canadian Parliament. The government was formed by the old Conservative Party of Canada.

== Ministers ==
- Prime Minister
  - 21 December 1894 – 1 May 1896: Sir Mackenzie Bowell
- Minister of Agriculture
  - 21 December 1894 – 13 July 1895: Auguste-Réal Angers
  - 13 July 1895 – 21 December 1895: Joseph-Aldric Ouimet (acting)
  - 21 December 1895 – 6 January 1896: Walter Humphries Montague
  - 6 January 1896 – 15 January 1896: Donald Ferguson (acting)
  - 15 January 1896 – 1 May 1896: Walter Humphries Montague
- Controller of Customs
  - 24 December 1895 – 6 January 1896: John Fisher Wood
  - 6 January 1896 – 15 January 1896: Sir Frank Smith (acting)
  - 15 January 1896 – 1 May 1896: John Fisher Wood
- Minister of Finance
  - 21 December 1894 – 6 January 1896: George Eulas Foster
  - 6 January 1896 – 15 January 1896: Sir Mackenzie Bowell (acting)
  - 15 January 1896 – 27 April 1896: George Eulas Foster
- Receiver General of Canada
  - 21 December 1894 – 27 April 1896: The Minister of Finance (Ex officio)
    - 21 December 1894 – 6 January 1896: George Eulas Foster
    - 6 January 1896 – 15 January 1896: Sir Mackenzie Bowell (acting)
    - 15 January 1896 – 1 May 1896: George Eulas Foster
- Superintendent-General of Indian Affairs
  - 21 December 1894 – 1 May 1896: The Minister of the Interior (Ex officio)
    - 21 December 1894 – 1 May 1896: Thomas Mayne Daly
- Controller of Inland Revenue
  - 17 December 1895 – 1 May 1896: Edward Gawler Prior
- Minister of the Interior
  - 21 December 1894 – 1 May 1896: Thomas Mayne Daly
- Minister of Justice
  - 21 December 1894 – 6 January 1896: Sir Charles Hibbert Tupper
  - 6 January 1896 – 15 January 1896: Thomas Mayne Daly (acting)
  - 15 January 1896 – 1 May 1896: Arthur Rupert Dickey
- Attorney General of Canada
  - 21 December 1894 – 27 April 1896: The Minister of Justice (Ex officio)
    - 21 December 1894 – 6 January 1896: Sir Charles Hibbert Tupper
    - 6 January 1896 – 15 January 1896: Thomas Mayne Daly (acting)
    - 15 January 1896 – 1 May 1896: Arthur Rupert Dickey
- Leader of the Government in the Senate
  - 21 December 1894 – 1 May 1896: Sir Mackenzie Bowell
- Minister of Marine and Fisheries
  - 21 December 1894 – 1 May 1896: John Costigan
- Minister of Militia and Defence
  - 21 December 1894 – 26 March 1895: James Colebrooke Patterson
  - 26 March 1895 – 6 January 1896: Arthur Rupert Dickey
  - 6 January 1896 – 15 January 1896: Sir Mackenzie Bowell (acting)
  - 15 January 1896 – 1 May 1896: Alphonse Desjardins
- Postmaster General
  - 21 December 1894 – 1 May 1896: Sir Joseph Philippe René Adolphe Caron
- President of the Privy Council
  - 21 December 1894 – 1 May 1896: Sir Mackenzie Bowell
- Minister of Public Works
- 21 December 1894 – 1 May 1896: Joseph-Aldric Ouimet
- Minister of Railways and Canals
  - 21 December 1894 – 6 January 1896: John Graham Haggart
  - 6 January 1896 – 15 January 1896: Joseph-Aldric Ouimet (acting)
  - 15 January 1896 – 1 May 1896: John Graham Haggart
- Secretary of State of Canada
  - 21 December 1894 – 26 March 1895: Arthur Rupert Dickey
  - 26 March 1895 – 21 December 1895: Walter Humphries Montague
  - 21 December 1895 – 6 January 1896: Joseph-Aldric Ouimet (acting)
  - 6 January 1896 – 15 January 1896: Thomas Mayne Daly (acting)
  - 15 January 1896 – 1 May 1896: Sir Charles Hibbert Tupper
- Registrar General of Canada
  - 21 December 1894 – 1 May 1896:: The Secretary of State of Canada (Ex officio)
    - 21 December 1894 – 26 March 1895: Arthur Rupert Dickey
    - 26 March 1895 – 21 December 1895: Walter Humphries Montague
    - 21 December 1895 – 6 January 1896: Joseph-Aldric Ouimet (acting)
    - 6 January 1896 – 15 January 1896: Thomas Mayne Daly (acting)
    - 15 January 1896 – 1 May 1896: Sir Charles Hibbert Tupper
- Minister of Trade and Commerce
  - 21 December 1894 – 6 January 1896: William Bullock Ives
  - 6 January 1896 – 15 January 1896: John Costigan (acting)
  - 15 January 1896 – 1 May 1896: William Bullock Ives
- Minister without Portfolio
  - 21 December 1894 – 26 March 1895: Walter Humphries Montague
  - 21 December 1894 – 1 May 1896: Sir Frank Smith
  - 2 January 1895 – 1 May 1896: Donald Ferguson
  - 26 March 1895 – 1 September 1895: James Colebrooke Patterson

== Offices not of the Cabinet ==
- Controller of Customs
  - 21 December 1894 – 14 December 1895: Nathaniel Clarke Wallace
  - 14 December 1895 – 17 December 1895: John Fisher Wood (acting)
  - 17 December 1895 – 24 December 1895: John Fisher Wood
- Controller of Inland Revenue
  - 21 December 1894 – 17 December 1895: John Fisher Wood
- Solicitor General of Canada
  - 21 December 1894 – 18 October 1895: John Joseph Curran
  - 18 October 1895 – 1 May 1896: Vacant

== Succession ==
Ministries of Canada
Preceded by 5th Canadian Ministry	6th Canadian Ministry; 1894–1896	Succeeded by 7th Canadian Ministry
