= Secretary of State for the Provinces =

Office in the Cabinet of Canada

- Member of: Cabinet of Canada
- Formation: July 1, 1867
- First holder: Adams George Archibald
- Final holder: Thomas Nicholson Gibbs
- Abolished: June 30, 1873

Secretary of State for the Provinces was an office in the Cabinet of Canada, active from 1867 to 1873. The office was superseded by the Minister of the Interior on May 3, 1873.

The position was responsible for managing the responsibilities and inter-governmental links between the federal government and the provincial counterparts. The post replaced that of the Secretary of State for the Colonies in Britain and that of the Provincial Secretary or Colonial Secretary within the former British colonies of British North America (see Provincial Secretary of Upper Canada, Provincial Secretary of Lower Canada, United Provinces of Canada)

== Ministers ==
Liberal-Conservative Party

No.	Portrait	Name	Term of office		Political party	Ministry
1		Sir Adams George Archibald	July 1, 1867	April 30, 1868	Liberal-Conservative	1 (Macdonald)
2		Joseph Howe	November 16, 1869	May 6, 1873	Liberal-Conservative	1 (Macdonald)
–		James Cox Aikins (Acting)	May 7, 1873	June 13, 1873	Liberal-Conservative	1 (Macdonald)
3		Thomas Nicholson Gibbs	June 14, 1873	June 30, 1873	Liberal-Conservative	1 (Macdonald)

== See also ==
- Secretary of State for the Colonies
- Provincial Secretary
  - Provincial Secretary and Registrar of Ontario
- Secretary of State for Canada
