= Postmaster General of Canada =

Former Canadian cabinet minister

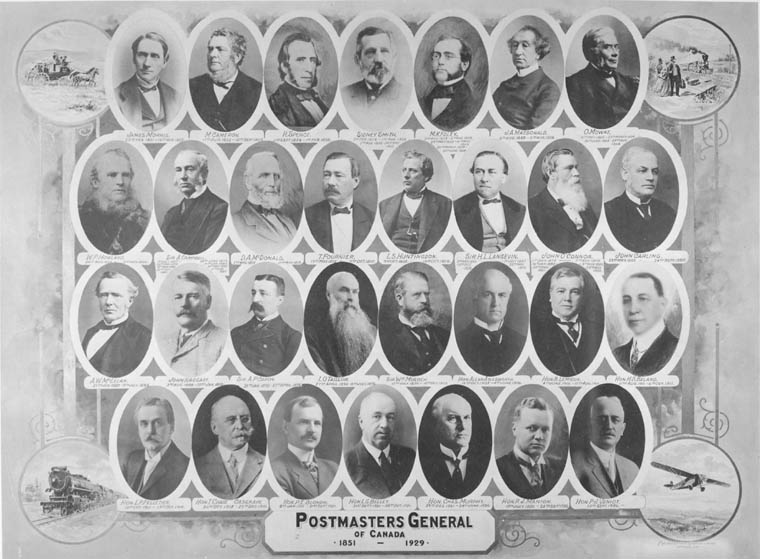
Postmasters General of Canada, 1851-1929 Credit: Agnes Macdonald, Baroness Macdonald of Earnscliffe Collection. / Library and Archives Canada / PA-066694

The Postmaster General of Canada was the Canadian cabinet minister responsible for the Post Office Department (Canada Post). In 1851, management of the post office was transferred from Britain (Royal Mail) to the provincial governments of the Province of Canada, New Brunswick, Newfoundland, Nova Scotia and Prince Edward Island. The position of Postmaster General was established in each province. With Canadian Confederation in 1867, a single position was created replacing this post in all of the above provinces except Newfoundland. this position was abolished in 1981 when the post office was transformed from a government department into a crown corporation. Since 1981 Canada Post has been led by a President and CEO. From 1900 until 1909 the Postmaster General was also responsible for the Department of Labour. It now reports to the Minister of Public Services and Procurement.

Canada Post Corporation has had its own CEO and President since 1981, who has most of the administrative responsibilities previously exercised by the Postmaster General. With the abolition of the position of Postmaster General the legislative and certain other duties previously exercised by the Postmaster General were transferred to the new position of Minister responsible for Canada Post Corporation.

== List of postmasters general ==
Key:

Liberal Party of Canada
Historical conservative parties: Liberal-Conservative, Conservative (historical), Unionist, National Liberal and Conservative, Progressive Conservative

No.	Portrait	Name	Term of office		Political party	Ministry
1		Alexander Campbell	July 1, 1867	June 30, 1873	Conservative	1 (Macdonald)
2		John O'Connor	July 1, 1873	November 5, 1873	Conservative	1 (Macdonald)
3		Donald Alexander Macdonald	November 7, 1873	May 17, 1875	Liberal	2 (Mackenzie)
4		Télesphore Fournier	May 19, 1875	October 7, 1875	Liberal	2 (Mackenzie)
5		Lucius Seth Huntington	October 9, 1875	October 8, 1878	Liberal	2 (Mackenzie)
6		Hector-Louis Langevin	October 19, 1878	May 19, 1879	Conservative	3 (Macdonald)
(1)		Alexander Campbell	May 20, 1879	January 15, 1880	Conservative	3 (Macdonald)
(2)		John O'Connor	January 16, 1880	November 7, 1880	Conservative	3 (Macdonald)
(1)		Alexander Campbell	November 8, 1880	May 18, 1881	Conservative	3 (Macdonald)
(2)		John O'Connor	May 20, 1881	May 22, 1882	Conservative	3 (Macdonald)
7		John Carling	May 23, 1882	September 24, 1885	Liberal-Conservative	3 (Macdonald)
(1)		Alexander Campbell	September 25, 1885	January 26, 1887	Conservative	3 (Macdonald)
8		Archibald McLelan	January 27, 1887	July 9, 1888	Conservative	3 (Macdonald)
–		John Carling (Acting)	July 11, 1888	August 5, 1888	Liberal-Conservative	3 (Macdonald)
9		John Graham Haggart	August 6, 1888	June 6, 1891	Conservative	3 (Macdonald)
9		John Graham Haggart	June 16, 1891	January 24, 1892	Conservative	4 (Abbott)
10		Adolphe-Philippe Caron	January 25, 1892	November 24, 1892	Conservative	4 (Abbott)
10		Adolphe-Philippe Caron	December 5, 1892	December 12, 1894	Conservative	5 (Thompson)
10		Adolphe-Philippe Caron	December 21, 1894	April 27, 1896	Conservative	6 (Bowell)
11		Louis-Olivier Taillon	May 1, 1896	July 8, 1896	Conservative	7 (Tupper)
12		William Mulock	July 13, 1896	October 15, 1905	Liberal	8 (Laurier)
13		Allen Bristol Aylesworth	October 16, 1905	June 3, 1906	Liberal	8 (Laurier)
14		Rodolphe Lemieux	June 4, 1906	August 10, 1911	Liberal	8 (Laurier)
15		Henri Sévérin Béland	August 19, 1911	October 6, 1911	Liberal	8 (Laurier)
16		Louis-Philippe Pelletier	October 10, 1911	October 19, 1914	Conservative	9 (Borden)
17		Thomas Chase-Casgrain	October 20, 1914	December 29, 1916	Conservative	9 (Borden)
18		Pierre-Édouard Blondin	January 8, 1917	October 12, 1917	Conservative	9 (Borden)
18		Pierre-Édouard Blondin	October 12, 1917	July 10, 1920	Conservative	10 (Borden)
18		Pierre-Édouard Blondin	July 10, 1920	September 20, 1921	Conservative	11 (Meighen)
19		Louis de Gonzague Belley	September 21, 1921	December 28, 1921	Conservative	11 (Meighen)
20		Charles Murphy	December 29, 1921	June 28, 1926	Liberal	12 (King)
21		Robert James Manion	June 29, 1926	September 24, 1926	Conservative	13 (Meighen)
22		Peter John Veniot	September 25, 1926	August 6, 1930	Liberal	14 (King)
23		Arthur Sauvé	August 7, 1930	August 13, 1935	Conservative	15 (Bennett)
24		Samuel Gobeil	August 16, 1935	October 22, 1935	Conservative	15 (Bennett)
25		John Campbell Elliott	October 23, 1935	January 22, 1939	Liberal	16 (King)
26		Norman Alexander McLarty	January 23, 1939	September 18, 1939	Liberal	16 (King)
27		Charles Gavan Power	September 19, 1939	May 22, 1940	Liberal	16 (King)
–		James Lorimer Ilsley (Acting)	May 23, 1940	July 7, 1940	Liberal	16 (King)
28		William Pate Mulock	July 8, 1940	June 8, 1945	Liberal	16 (King)
29		Ernest Bertrand	August 29, 1945	November 14, 1948	Liberal	16 (King)
29		Ernest Bertrand	November 15, 1948	August 23, 1949	Liberal	17 (St. Laurent)
30		Édouard Rinfret	August 25, 1949	February 12, 1952	Liberal	17 (St. Laurent)
31		Alcide Côté	February 13, 1952	August 7, 1955	Liberal	17 (St. Laurent)
–		Roch Pinard (Acting)	August 16, 1955	November 2, 1955	Liberal	17 (St. Laurent)
32		Hugues Lapointe	November 3, 1955	June 20, 1957	Liberal	17 (St. Laurent)
33		William McLean Hamilton	June 21, 1957	July 12, 1962	Progressive Conservative	18 (Diefenbaker)
–		Angus MacLean (Acting)	July 18, 1962	August 8, 1962	Progressive Conservative	18 (Diefenbaker)
34		Ellen Fairclough	August 9, 1962	April 21, 1963	Progressive Conservative	18 (Diefenbaker)
35		Azellus Denis	April 22, 1963	February 2, 1964	Liberal	19 (Pearson)
36		John Robert Nicholson	February 3, 1964	February 14, 1965	Liberal	19 (Pearson)
37		René Tremblay	February 15, 1965	December 17, 1965	Liberal	19 (Pearson)
38		Jean-Pierre Côté	December 18, 1965	April 19, 1968	Liberal	19 (Pearson)
38		Jean-Pierre Côté	April 20, 1968	July 5, 1968	Liberal	20 (Trudeau)
39		Eric Kierans	July 6, 1968	April 28, 1971	Liberal	20 (Trudeau)
(38)		Jean-Pierre Côté	April 29, 1971	November 26, 1972	Liberal	20 (Trudeau)
40		André Ouellet	November 27, 1972	August 7, 1974	Liberal	20 (Trudeau)
41		Bryce Mackasey	August 8, 1974	September 13, 1976	Liberal	20 (Trudeau)
42		Jean-Jacques Blais	September 14, 1976	February 1, 1978	Liberal	20 (Trudeau)
43		Gilles Lamontagne	February 2, 1978	June 3, 1979	Liberal	20 (Trudeau)
44		John Allen Fraser	June 4, 1979	March 2, 1980	Progressive Conservative	21 (Clark)
(40)		André Ouellet	March 3, 1980	October 15, 1981	Liberal	20 (Trudeau)

== See also ==
- List of Postmasters General for the Province of Canada
