= Daly House Museum =

Museum in Brandon, Manitoba, Canada

Coordinates: 49.8478°N 99.9623°W

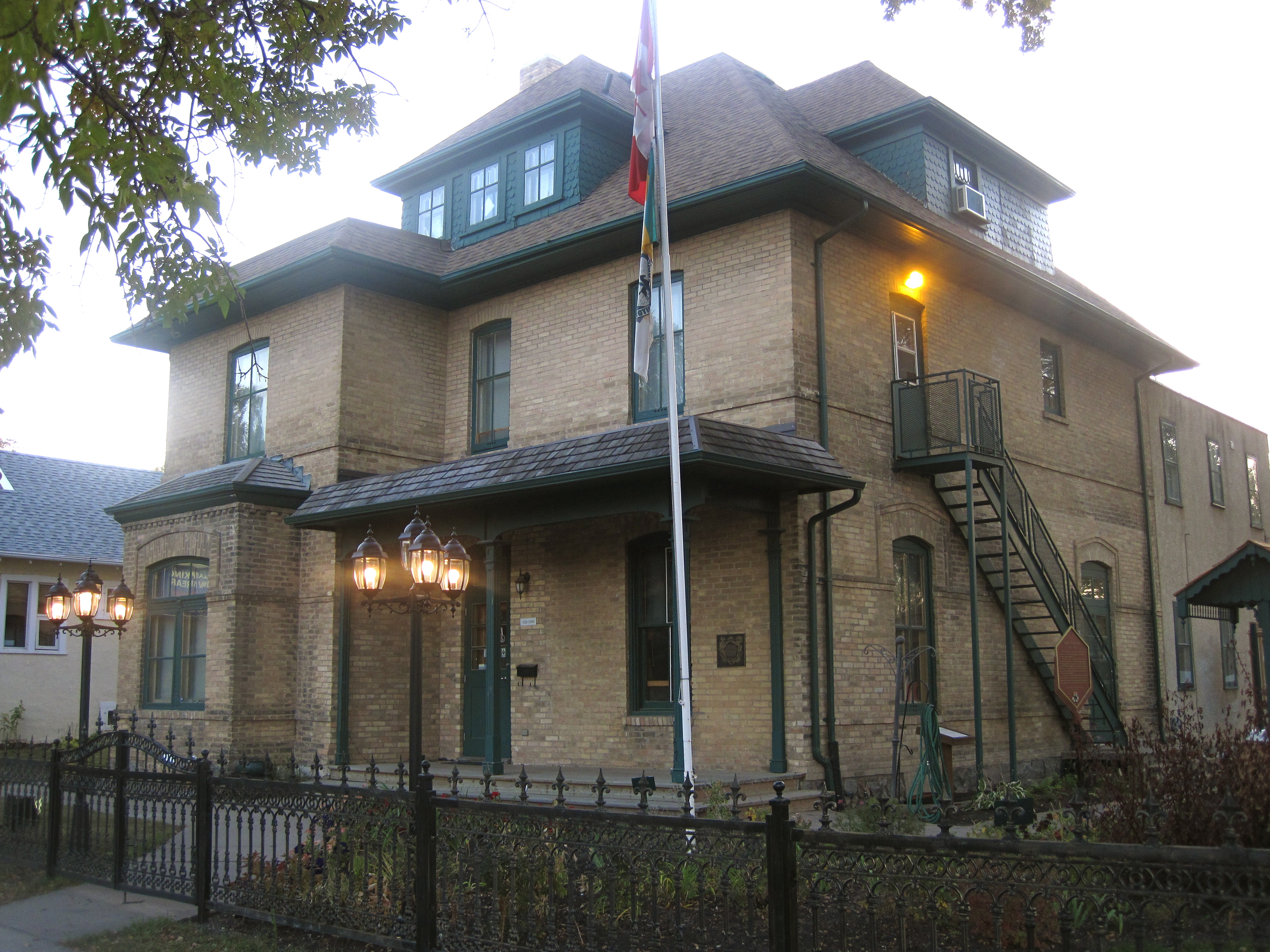

Daly House Museum is located in Brandon, Manitoba. It is a 2 1/2-story house (plus basement) that recreates a typical upper-class late-19th-century home. Much of the original architecture is intact, including hardwood floors, brick fireplace and an oak staircase. The following rooms are recreated in the museum:

- Parlour
- Dining Room
- Kitchen
- Master Bedroom
- Guest Room
- Children's Room

The museum also includes a replica of an early-20th-century general store, as well as a room devoted to standing exhibits. It also has general exhibits in the lower floor devoted to local history.

== Building history ==
The Daly house, located on 18th Street in Brandon, Manitoba, was built in 1882 for Thomas Mayne Daly, the first mayor of Brandon. When Daly and his family moved to Roseland, BC in 1896, the house was sold to Daly's law partner George Robson Coldwell. The Coldwell family lived in the house for approximately 32 years.

In 1930, the house was taken over by the City of Brandon and became The Maples, a children's shelter. It was owned and ran by the city and hired workers from the Children's Aid Society of Western Manitoba for daily operations. In 1967, the city handed over the house to the Children's Aid Society of Western Manitoba and they relocated to a new facility in 1972.

After five years of vacancy, the non-profit organization Brandon Museum Inc. took over the building. The museum opened in 1978 and was named after its original owner, Thomas Mayne Daly.
