= Nathaniel Clarke Wallace =

Canadian politician

Clarke Wallace
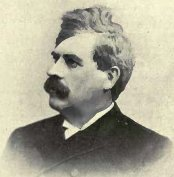

Member of the Canadian Parliament for York West
- In office 1878–1901
- Preceded by: David Blain
- Succeeded by: Archibald Campbell

Personal details
- Party: Conservative
- Committees: Chair, Standing Committee on Public Accounts (1891); Chair, Select Committee on Alleged Combinations in Manufactures, Trade and Insurance in Canada (1888)

Controller of Customs
- In office 1892–1895
- Prime Minister: Thompson; Bowell
- Preceded by: Joseph-Adolphe Chapleau (Note: as Minister of Customs)
- Succeeded by: John Fisher Wood

Personal details
- Born: 21 May 1844 Burwick (Woodbridge), Canada West
- Died: 8 October 1901 (aged 57) Woodbridge, Ontario
- Children: Thomas George Wallace

Nathaniel Clarke Wallace (21 May 1844 – 8 October 1901) was a Canadian politician and Orangeman.

== Early life and family ==
Clarke Wallance was born in Burwick, Canada West, and was the third son of the Nathanael Wallace and Ann Wallace, natives of County Sligo, Ireland, who came to Canada in 1834 and 1833 respectively. He was educated in Woodbridge Public School and at the Weston Grammar School.

== Early career ==
After finishing school, Wallace spent five year as a school teacher. He later became a merchant and flour miller.

Wallace entered public life in 1874, became the reeve of Vaughan, and held the post until 1878. In the final year in office, he also served as the warden of York County.

== Orange order ==
Wallace's political trajectory was closely tied to his affiliation with the Orange Order. His father had founded Woodbridge’s Orange lodge, which he joined at age 21. He rose through the ranks in the following quarter decade to become the order's grand master of British America in 1887, and in 1891 the president of its Triennial Council, an umbrella organization dedicated to strengthening the fraternal ties among the various national branches of the order around the world.

== Parliamentary career ==
Wallace was elected as a Liberal-Conservative to the House of Commons of Canada for York West in the 1878 Canadian federal election, and was re-elected in 1882, 1887, 1891, 1896, and 1900. He contested the 1896 election as an independent in protest of the government's stance on Manitoba schools.

Wallace rose to prominence in the late 1880s prosecuting a populist issue of the day, corporate combines. In February 1888 the government struck a select committee to examine the impact of combinations in Canadian manufacturing and wholesale distribution and Wallace was named chair. While his push for anti-combines legislation was frustrated by intensive business lobby by the Toronto Board of Trade, Wallace built his reputation as a populist champion.

Wallace was one of thirteen members who in March 1889 voted for a motion by Dalton McCarthy to disallow Quebec's Jesuit Estates Act. The failed motion caused a rift in the Orange grand lodge, pitting him against a pro-government fraction led by then minister of customs Mackenzie Bowell, a former grand master.

Ironically, Wallace's militant Protestantism was what led him to the front bench. When Catholic Sir John Sparrow David Thompson became prime minister in November 1892, he needed a recognized Protestant advocate in a prominent position to reassure Protestant public opinion, and Wallace was the comparatively less polarizing option. Wallace joined the Thompson ministry on December 5, 1892 as controller of customs, heading the department as it was downgraded to sub-cabinet status. His experience in commence and mastery of detail earned him much praise hor his efficient administration of the department. Wallace retained the customs portfolio in the Bowell ministry, but actively campaign against his own government's threat of remedial legislation on Manitoba schools in late 1895. He resigned from the ministry and left the Conservative Party on December 13, 1895. While two of his successors also held the custom portfolio while sub-cabinet, Wallace was the only controller of customs who was never promoted into cabinet. In 1896 he stood for re-election as an independent, won a landslide victory in York West while his former party went down to defeat. Wallace returned to the Conservative fold in the fall of 1898.

He died in office in 1901. His brother T. F. Wallace contested the subsequent by-election, but was defeated by Archibald Campbell, a former MP for Kent. His son Thomas George Wallace was elected MP for York Centre, a successor district of York West, in 1908, and later served as MP for York West when it was reinstituted in 1917, serving until his own death in 1921.

== Electoral record ==
1900 Canadian federal election: York West
Party	Candidate	Votes	%	±%
Conservative	Nathaniel Clarke Wallace	5,126	54.3	-31.5
Liberal	Archibald Campbell	4,306	45.7	
Total valid votes		9,432	100.0	

1896 Canadian federal election: York West
Party	Candidate	Votes	%	±%
Independent Conservative	Nathaniel Clarke Wallace	5,018	74.8	+18.2
Patrons of Industry	John Brown	950	14.2	
Conservative	James Platt	745	11.1	
Total valid votes		6,713	100.0	
Note: Wallace resigned from ministry 14 December 1895 and ran as an independent in this election, but returned to the Conservative fold in fall of 1898. Note: popular vote compared to himself as a Caonservative candidate vote in 1891 general election.

Canadian federal by-election, 21 December 1892: York West Ministerial by-election: on appointment as Controller of Customs
Party	Candidate	Votes
Conservative	Nathaniel Clarke Wallace	Acclaimed

1891 Canadian federal election: York West
Party	Candidate	Votes	%	±%
Conservative	Nathaniel Clarke Wallace	3,434	56.6	+1.1
Liberal	W.H.P. Clement	2,628	43.4	-1.1
Total valid votes		6,062	100.0	

1887 Canadian federal election: York West
Party	Candidate	Votes	%	±%
Conservative	Nathaniel Clarke Wallace	2,638	55.6	+1.5
Liberal	Adam Maconchy Lynd	2,110	44.4	
Total valid votes		4,748	100.0	

1882 Canadian federal election: York West
Party	Candidate	Votes	%	±%
Conservative	Nathaniel Clarke Wallace	1,561	54.1	0.0
Independent	Thos. Hodgins	1,324	45.9	
Total valid votes		2,885	100.0	

1878 Canadian federal election: York West
Party	Candidate	Votes	%	±%
Conservative	Nathaniel Clarke Wallace	1,326	54.1	+22.4
Liberal	David Blain	1,124	45.9	-22.4
Total valid votes		2,450	100.0	

1874 Canadian federal election: York West
Party	Candidate	Votes	%	±%
Liberal	David Blain	983	68.3	+12.2
Conservative	N. Wallace	456	31.7	
Total valid votes		1,439	100.0	
Source: lop.parl.ca

Parliament of Canada
Preceded by David Blain	MP for York West; 1878–1901	Succeeded by Archibald Campbell
5th Canadian Ministry (1892–1894) – Cabinet of John Thompson
6th Canadian Ministry (1894–1896) – Cabinet of Mackenzie Bowell
Preceded by Joseph-Adolphe Chapleau as Minister of Customs	Controller of Customs (sub-cabinet); 1892–1895	Succeeded by John Fisher Wood
