= David Blain =

Canadian politician

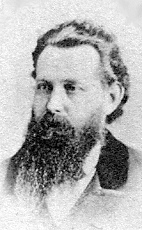

Member of the Canadian Parliament for York West
- In office 1872–1878
- Preceded by: Amos Wright
- Succeeded by: Nathaniel Clarke Wallace

Personal details
- Born: August 12, 1832 Ayr, Scotland
- Died: May 6, 1909 (aged 76) Toronto, Ontario, Canada
- Party: Liberal
- Spouse: Eliza Harrington
- Occupation: Lawyer

David Blain (August 12, 1832 – May 6, 1909) was a Scottish-born Canadian lawyer, teacher and political figure. He represented York West in the House of Commons of Canada from 1872 to 1878 as a Liberal member.

He was born near Ayr, the son of John Blain and Elizabeth McCutcheon, and came to Canada West with his parents in 1842. He was educated in Scotland and at the University of Toronto. Blain was called to the bar in 1860 and set up practice in Toronto, partnering for a time with Albert Prince. In 1867, he married Eliza Harrington. He retired from the practice of law in 1868. Blain was defeated in a bid for reelection in 1878. He retired from politics afterwards, and died in Toronto at the age of 76 in 1909.

== Electoral record ==
1878 Canadian federal election: York West
Party	Candidate	Votes	%	±%
Conservative	Nathaniel Clarke Wallace	1,326	54.1	+22.4
Liberal	David Blain	1,124	45.9	-22.4
Total valid votes		2,450	100.0	

1874 Canadian federal election: York West
Party	Candidate	Votes	%	±%
Liberal	David Blain	983	68.3	+12.2
Conservative	N. Wallace	456	31.7	
Total valid votes		1,439	100.0	
Source: lop.parl.ca

1872 Canadian federal election: York West/York-Ouest
Party	Candidate	Votes	%	±%
Liberal	David Blain	973	56.1	-16.3
Unknown	W. Tyrrell	760	43.9	
Total valid votes		1,733	100.0	
Source: Canadian Elections Database

Parliament of Canada
Preceded by Amos Wright	Member of Parliament for York West; 1872–1878	Succeeded by Nathaniel Clarke Wallace
