= 7th Canadian Ministry =

Government cabinet of Canada (1896)

7th Canadian Ministry 7e conseil des ministres du Canada
- 7th ministry of Canada

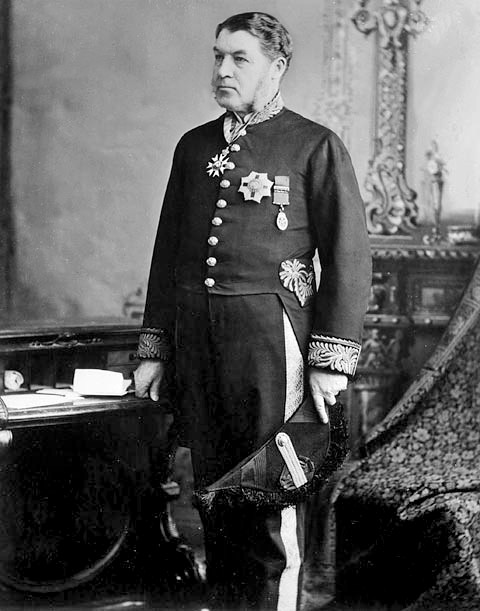
- Date formed: 1 May 1896
- Date dissolved: 8 July 1896

People and organizations
- Monarch: Victoria
- Governor General: Earl of Aberdeen
- Prime Minister: Charles Tupper
- Member party: Conservative
- Status in legislature: Majority
- Opposition party: Liberal
- Opposition leader: Wilfrid Laurier

History
- Incoming formation: 1896 Canadian political crisis
- Outgoing formation: 1896 federal election
- Legislature terms: None (between the 7th and 8th Parliament)
- Predecessor: 6th Canadian Ministry
- Successor: 8th Canadian Ministry

The Seventh Canadian Ministry was the cabinet chaired by Prime Minister Sir Charles Tupper. It governed Canada from 1 May to 8 July 1896. It was formed after the 7th Canadian Parliament was dissolved, and lost the 8th Canadian federal election, so it never faced a parliament. The government was formed by the old Conservative Party of Canada.

== Cabinet ==
- Prime Minister
  - 1 May 1896 – 11 July 1896: Sir Charles Tupper
- Minister of Agriculture
  - 1 May 1896 – 11 July 1896: Walter Humphries Montague
- Controller of Customs
  - 1 May 1896 – 11 July 1896: John Fisher Wood
- Minister of Finance
  - 1 May 1896 – 11 July 1896: George Eulas Foster
- Receiver General of Canada
  - 1 May 1896 – 11 July 1896: The Minister of Finance (Ex officio)
    - 1 May 1896 – 11 July 1896: George Eulas Foster
- Superintendent-General of Indian Affairs
  - 1 May 1896 – 11 July 1896: The Minister of the Interior (Ex officio)
    - 1 May 1896 – 11 July 1896: Hugh John Macdonald
- Controller of Inland Revenue
  - 1 May 1896 – 11 July 1896: Edward Gawler Prior
- Minister of the Interior
  - 1 May 1896 – 11 July 1896: Hugh John Macdonald
- Minister of Justice
  - 1 May 1896 – 11 July 1896: Arthur Rupert Dickey
- Attorney General of Canada
  - 1 May 1896 – 11 July 1896: The Minister of Justice (Ex officio)
    - 1 May 1896 – 11 July 1896: Arthur Rupert Dickey
- Leader of the Government in the Senate
  - 1 May 1896 – 11 July 1896: Mackenzie Bowell
- Minister of Marine and Fisheries
  - 1 May 1896 – 11 July 1896: John Costigan
- Minister of Militia and Defence
  - 1 May 1896 – 11 July 1896: David Tisdale
- Postmaster General
  - 1 May 1896 – 11 July 1896: Louis-Olivier Taillon
- President of the Privy Council
  - 1 May 1896 – 11 July 1896: Auguste-Réal Angers
- Minister of Public Works
  - 1 May 1896 – 11 July 1896: Alphonse Desjardins
- Minister of Railways and Canals
  - 1 May 1896 – 11 July 1896: John Graham Haggart
- Secretary of State of Canada
  - 1 May 1896 – 11 July 1896: Sir Charles Tupper
- Registrar General of Canada
  - 1 May 1896 – 11 July 1896: The Secretary of State of Canada (Ex officio)
    - 1 May 1896 – 11 July 1896: Sir Charles Tupper
- Minister of Trade and Commerce
  - 1 May 1896 – 11 July 1896: William Bullock Ives
- Minister without Portfolio
  - 1 May 1896 – 11 July 1896: Donald Ferguson
  - 1 May 1896 – 11 July 1896: John Jones Ross
  - 1 May 1896 – 11 July 1896: Sir Frank Smith

== Offices not of the Cabinet ==
- Solicitor-General
  - 1 May 1896 – 11 July 1896: Sir Charles Hibbert Tupper

== Succession ==
Ministries of Canada
Preceded by 6th Canadian Ministry	7th Canadian Ministry; 1896	Succeeded by 8th Canadian Ministry
