= 8th Canadian Ministry =

Government cabinet of Canada (1896–1911)

8th Canadian Ministry 8e conseil des ministres du Canada
- 8th ministry of Canada

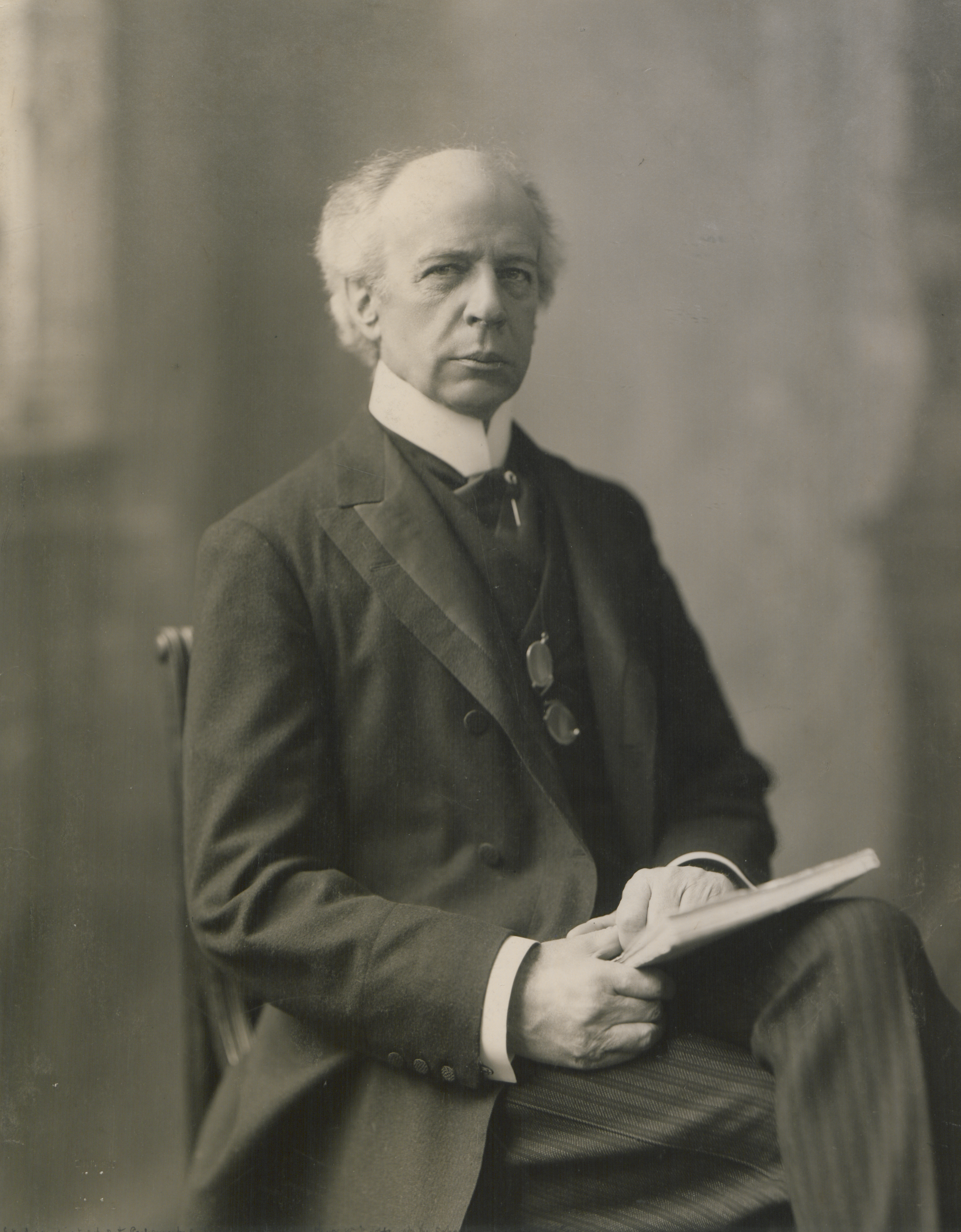
- Date formed: 11 July 1896
- Date dissolved: 6 October 1911

People and organizations
- Monarch: Victoria; Edward VII; George V
- Governor General: Earl of Aberdeen; Earl of Minto; Earl Grey
- Prime Minister: Wilfrid Laurier
- Member party: Liberal
- Status in legislature: Majority
- Opposition party: Conservative
- Opposition leader: Charles Tupper (1896–1901); Robert Borden (1901–1911)

History
- Elections: 1896, 1900, 1904, 1908
- Outgoing election: 1911
- Legislature terms: 8th Canadian Parliament; 9th Canadian Parliament; 10th Canadian Parliament; 11th Canadian Parliament
- Predecessor: 7th Canadian Ministry
- Successor: 9th Canadian Ministry

The Eighth Canadian Ministry was the cabinet chaired by Prime Minister Sir Wilfrid Laurier. It governed Canada from 11 July 1896 to 5 October 1911, including all of the 8th, 9th, 10th, and 11th Canadian Parliaments. The government was formed by the Liberal Party of Canada.

== The Cabinet ==
- Prime Minister
  - 11 July 1896 – 10 October 1911: Sir Wilfrid Laurier
- Minister of Agriculture
  - 11 July 1896 – 10 October 1911: Sydney Arthur Fisher
- Minister of Customs
  - 30 June 1897 – 10 October 1911: William Paterson
- Secretary of State for External Affairs
  - 19 May 1909 – 10 October 1911: Charles Murphy
- Minister of Finance
  - 11 July 1896 – 20 July 1896: Vacant (John Mortimer Courtney was acting)
  - 20 July 1896 – 10 October 1911: William Stevens Fielding
- Receiver General of Canada
  - 11 July 1896 – 10 October 1911: The Minister of Finance (Ex officio)
    - 11 July 1896 – 20 July 1896: Vacant (John Mortimer Courtney was acting)
    - 20 July 1896 – 10 October 1911: William Stevens Fielding
- Superintendent-General of Indian Affairs
  - 11 July 1896 – 10 October 1911: The Minister of the Interior (Ex officio)
    - 11 July 1896 – 17 July 1896: Vacant (Hayter Reed was acting)
    - 17 July 1896 – 17 November 1896: Richard William Scott (acting)
    - 17 November 1896 – 28 February 1905: Clifford Sifton
    - 28 February 1905 – 13 March 1905: Vacant (Francis Pedley was acting)
    - 13 March 1905 – 8 April 1905: Sir Wilfrid Laurier
    - 8 April 1905 – 10 October 1911: Frank Oliver
- Minister of Inland Revenue
  - 30 June 1897 – 22 June 1900: Sir Henri-Gustave Joly de Lotbinière
  - 22 June 1900 – 19 January 1904: Michel-Esdras Bernier
  - 19 January 1904 – 6 February 1906: Louis-Philippe Brodeur
  - 6 February 1906 – 10 October 1911: William Templeman
- Minister of the Interior
  - 11 July 1896 – 17 July 1896: Vacant (Alexander Mackinnon Burgess was acting)
  - 17 July 1896 – 17 November 1896: Richard William Scott (acting)
  - 17 November 1896 – 28 February 1905: Clifford Sifton
  - 28 February 1905 – 13 March 1905: Vacant (William Wallace Cory was acting)
  - 13 March 1905 – 8 April 1905: Sir Wilfrid Laurier
  - 8 April 1905 – 10 October 1911: Frank Oliver
- Minister of Justice
  - 11 July 1896 – 18 November 1897: Sir Oliver Mowat
  - 18 November 1897 – 8 February 1902: David Mills
  - 8 February 1902 – 4 June 1906: Charles Fitzpatrick
  - 4 June 1906 – 10 October 1911: Sir Allen Bristol Aylesworth
- Attorney General of Canada
  - 11 July 1896 – 10 October 1911: The Minister of Justice (Ex officio)
    - 11 July 1896 – 18 November 1897: Sir Oliver Mowat
    - 18 November 1897 – 8 February 1902: David Mills
    - 8 February 1902 – 4 June 1906: Charles Fitzpatrick
    - 4 June 1906 – 10 October 1911: Allen Bristol Aylesworth
- Minister of Labour
  - 19 May 1909 – 2 June 1909: Vacant (William Lyon Mackenzie King was acting)
  - 2 June 1909 – 10 October 1911: William Lyon Mackenzie King
- Leader of the Government in the Senate
  - 11 July 1896 – 18 November 1897: Sir Oliver Mowat
  - 18 November 1897 – 7 February 1902: David Mills
  - 7 February 1902 – 20 January 1909: Richard William Scott
  - 20 January 1909 – 10 October 1911: Richard John Cartwright
- Minister of Marine and Fisheries
  - 11 July 1896 – 25 September 1901: Sir Louis Henry Davies
  - 25 September 1901 – 15 January 1902: Vacant (François Frédéric Gourdeau was acting)
  - 15 January 1902 – 11 November 1902: James Sutherland
  - 11 November 1902 – 26 December 1905: Raymond Préfontaine
  - 26 December 1905 – 6 January 1906: Vacant (François Frédéric Gourdeau was acting)
  - 6 January 1906 – 6 February 1906: Sir Wilfrid Laurier
  - 6 February 1906 – 11 August 1911: Louis-Philippe Brodeur
  - 11 August 1911 – 10 October 1911: Rodolphe Lemieux
- Minister of Militia and Defence
  - 11 July 1896 – 10 October 1911: Sir Frederick William Borden
- Minister of Mines
  - 27 April 1907 – 3 May 1907: Vacant (Albert Peter Low was acting)
  - 3 May 1907 – 10 October 1911: William Templeman
- Minister of the Naval Service
  - 4 May 1910 – 11 August 1911: Louis-Philippe Brodeur
  - 11 August 1911 – 10 October 1911: Rodolphe Lemieux
- Postmaster General
  - 11 July 1896 – 16 October 1905: Sir William Mulock
  - 16 October 1905 – 4 June 1906: Allen Bristol Aylesworth
  - 4 June 1906 – 19 August 1911: Rodolphe Lemieux
  - 19 August 1911 – 10 October 1911: Henri Sévérin Béland
- President of the Privy Council
  - 11 July 1896 – 10 October 1911: Sir Wilfrid Laurier
- Minister of Public Works
  - 11 July 1896 – 22 October 1902: Joseph-Israël Tarte
  - 22 October 1902 – 11 November 1902: Vacant (Sir Wilfrid Laurier was acting)
  - 11 November 1902 – 4 May 1905: James Sutherland
  - 4 May 1905 – 22 May 1905: Vacant (Sir Wilfrid Laurier was acting)
  - 22 May 1905 – 30 August 1907: Charles Smith Hyman
  - 30 August 1907 – 10 October 1911: William Pugsley
- Minister of Railways and Canals
  - 11 July 1896 – 20 July 1896: Vacant (Collingwood Schreiber was acting)
  - 20 July 1896 – 21 July 1903: Andrew George Blair
  - 21 July 1903 – 15 January 1904: William Stevens Fielding
  - 15 January 1904 – 3 April 1907: Henry Emmerson
  - 3 April 1907 – 9 April 1907: Vacant (Matthew Joseph Butler was acting)
  - 9 April 1907 – 10 October 1911: George Perry Graham
- Secretary of State of Canada
  - 11 July 1896 – 9 October 1908: Richard William Scott
  - 9 October 1908 – 10 October 1911: Charles Murphy
- Registrar General of Canada
  - 11 July 1896 – 10 October 1911: The Secretary of State of Canada (Ex officio)
    - 11 July 1896 – 9 October 1908: Richard William Scott
    - 9 October 1908 – 10 October 1911: Charles Murphy
- Minister of Trade and Commerce
  - 11 July 1896 – 10 October 1911: Sir Richard John Cartwright
- Minister without Portfolio
  - 11 July 1896 – 12 January 1902: Richard Reid Dobell
  - 21 August 1896 – 19 July 1899: Christophe-Alphonse Geoffrion
  - 30 September 1899 – 15 January 1902: James Sutherland
  - 25 February 1902 – 6 February 1906: Charles Smith Hyman
  - 5 February 1904 – 22 May 1905: William Templeman

== Offices not of the Cabinet ==
Controller of Customs

- 11 July 1896 – 30 June 1897: William Paterson

Controller of Inland Revenue

- 11 July 1896 – 30 June 1897: Sir Henri-Gustave Joly de Lotbinière

Solicitor General of Canada

- 11 July 1896 – 10 February 1902: Charles Fitzpatrick
- 10 February 1902 – 29 January 1904: Henry George Carroll
- 29 January 1904 – 4 June 1906: Rodolphe Lemieux
- 4 June 1906 – 14 February 1907: Vacant
- 14 February 1907 – 10 October 1911: Jacques Bureau

== Succession ==
Ministries of Canada
Preceded by 7th Canadian Ministry	8th Canadian Ministry; 1896–1911	Succeeded by 9th Canadian Ministry
