= John Mortimer Courtney =

Canadian civil servant

- Born: July 22, 1838; Penzance, England
- Died: October 8, 1920 (aged 82); Ottawa, Ontario, Canada
- Known for: Civil servant

John Mortimer Courtney, CMG ISO (July 22, 1838 – October 8, 1920) was a Canadian civil servant.

== Biography ==
Born in Penzance, England, he was the second son of John Sampson Courtney and Sarah Mortimer.

Courtney worked at Mount's Bay Bank in Penzance, then in India with the Agra Bank in Calcutta and in New South Wales, Australia, and finally with Royal Bank of India.

In 1869, he joined the Public Service of Canada, working under John Langton as a chief clerk and assistant secretary to the Treasury Board of Canada.

In 1878, he was promoted to deputy minister and ex officio deputy receiver general and secretary to the Treasury Board.

He was appointed Companion of the Order of St Michael and St George in 1898 and Companion of the Imperial Service Order in 1903.

He retired in 1906.

His brother Leonard Courtney, 1st Baron Courtney of Penwith, was a British politician and man of letters.
