= Thomas Mayne Daly =

Canadian politician

The Honourable Thomas Mayne Daly PC KC
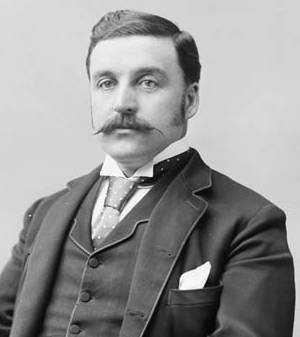

Member of the Canadian Parliament for Selkirk
- In office 1887–1896
- Preceded by: Hugh McKay Sutherland
- Succeeded by: John Alexander MacDonell

Personal details
- Born: August 16, 1852 Stratford, Canada West
- Died: June 24, 1911 (aged 58) Winnipeg, Manitoba, Canada
- Party: Liberal-Conservative
- Relations: Thomas Mayne Daly, father John Corry Wilson Daly, grandfather
- Cabinet: Superintendent-General of Indian Affairs (1892–1896); Minister of the Interior (1892–1896); Secretary of State of Canada (Acting) (1896); Minister of Justice and Attorney General of Canada (Acting) (1896)

Thomas Mayne Daly, PC, KC (August 16, 1852 – June 24, 1911) was a Canadian politician.

Born in Stratford, Canada West (now Ontario), the son of Thomas Mayne Daly (1827–1885) and Helen McLaren (Ferguson) Daly, his father was a member of the House of Commons of Canada for the riding of Perth North. His grandfather, John Corry Wilson Daly, was the first mayor of Stratford.

He was educated as a lawyer and was called to the Law Society of Upper Canada in 1876. He practised law in Stratford until 1881. In 1881, he moved to Brandon, Manitoba and practised law in partnership with George Robson Coldwell. In 1882, he was elected the first mayor of Brandon. During his first six-month term, Daly initiated a civic development program which allowed for raising $150 000 through debentures. He resigned as Mayor in December 1882. In 1884 he was re-elected as the Mayor of Brandon.

In 1887, Daly was elected to the Canadian House of Commons in the riding of Selkirk as a Liberal-Conservative. He was reelected in 1891. He did not run in 1896. He was defeated in 1908. He was created a QC by the Governor General Lord Stanley in 1890.

From 1892 to 1896, he was the Minister of the Interior and Superintendent-General of Indian Affairs, in the cabinet of Sir John Abbott, becoming the first federal Cabinet Minister from Manitoba. In 1896, he was Minister of Justice and Attorney General of Canada (Acting) and Secretary of State of Canada (Acting).

In 1903, he was appointed Police Magistrate of Winnipeg and in 1909 was appointed a Judge of the first Juvenile Court in Canada.

A well-known tale recounts how Calgary lawyer Paddy Nolan's physical resemblance to Daly often led to the two being confused for each other. Once, after Daly had jokingly angered a legal client of Nolan's by impersonating the lawyer, Nolan got his revenge by refusing to grant a patent to a prospective homesteader, insisting that the Ministry of the Interior would require a bribe in order to look at his file - leading to Daly sending Nolan a note several days later about the "bad name" that the Ministry was getting due to his hijinx.

The Rural Municipality of Daly was named for him.

== Museum ==
The Daly House Museum in Brandon, Manitoba, is located in Thomas Mayne Daly's Brandon home, which was built in 1882. The museum now contains four floors of artifacts and archival materials representative of Brandon's early history.

== Archives ==
There is a Thomas Mayne Daly fonds at Library and Archives Canada. Archival reference number is R4035.
