= National Liberal and Conservative Party =

Canadian conservative political party

The National Liberal and Conservative Party was the name adopted by the Conservative Party of Canada in 1920 after the end of the Unionist government of Robert Borden.

The Conservatives, led by Arthur Meighen, adopted the name in the hope of making permanent the war-time Unionist coalition of Conservatives and pro-conscription Liberals (known as Liberal-Unionists). Very few Liberals stayed with the party, and some Conservatives balked at the move. MP John Hampden Burnham quit the government caucus to sit as an Independent Conservative and then resigned from the House of Commons in an attempt to win a by-election on the issue.

After its defeat in the 1921 election the party caucus adopted the name Liberal-Conservative Party used until 1917 (although it was commonly known as the Conservative Party). The name was officially changed to the National Conservative Party at the party's 1938 convention.

== See also ==
- List of political parties in Canada
