= Frank Smith (Canadian politician) =

Canadian politician (1822–1901)

The Honourable Sir Frank Smith PC
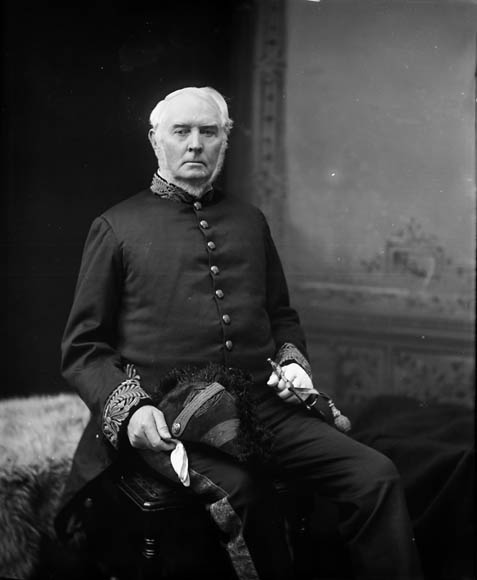

Canadian Senator from Ontario
- In office February 2, 1871 – January 17, 1901
- Appointed by: John A. Macdonald

Personal details
- Born: March 13, 1822 Richill, Armagh, Ireland
- Died: January 17, 1901 (aged 78) Toronto, Ontario, Canada
- Party: Conservative
- Spouse: Mary Theresa O'Higgins (1832–1896)
- Children: James Austin Smith (son); Hugh Harvey Smith(son); Marcella Clara Smith (daughter); Frances Anastasia Smith (daughter); Gertrude Anne Smith (daughter)
- Cabinet: Minister Without Portfolio (1882–1891 & 1892–1896); Minister of Public Works (1891–1892); Controller of Customs (Acting) (1896)

Sir Frank Smith, PC (March 13, 1822 – January 17, 1901) was a Canadian businessman and senator. Smith was born in County Armagh, Ireland, in 1822 and immigrated to Canada at the age of ten years old with his family in 1832 where his father Patrick Smith established a farm in Port Credit.

== Business career ==
Smith went into commerce, first working as a clerk in several Toronto stores, and then opening his own wholesalers in London, Ontario in 1849. After a few years of limited business, the arrival of the railway in London set off an economic boom and Smith prospered greatly. He expanded his business interests, including becoming the primary shareholder in the Toronto Street Railways.

Smith made his fortune with the streetcar service generating record products by cutting costs, not replacing aged cars and requiring his employees to work 14-hour days, six days a week for $8 to $9 a week. When his workers threatened to join the Knights of Labor trade union he locked them out resulting in three days of violent protests. Mayor William Holmes Howland and the press supported the workers' right to organize but Smith refused to allow a union and criticized the city government for failing to maintain order.

In the end, Smith allowed limited pay increases but refused to allow a union and fired the organizers prompting a strike and the establishment of a rival, worker run "Free Bus Company" which was soon out of business when its fleet was destroyed by fire. Smith's actions alienated the Toronto working class, particularly Catholic workers among whom he hoped to build a political base. Smith sold his share of the TSR to the city in 1881 for $500,000.

In 1866 Smith expanded to his business enterprise into wholesale groceries before becoming the President of Dominion Bank and a promoter of the Niagara Navigation Company a decade later.

== Political career ==
In 1866, Sir Frank Smith was elected mayor of London, Ontario.

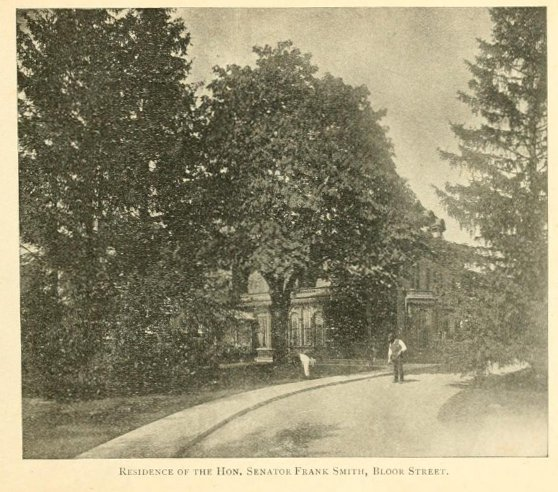
The Senator's residence in Toronto, seen in the 1890s.

Originally a supporter of the Reform movement that evolved in the Liberal Party, Sir John A. Macdonald persuaded him to switch his allegiance to the Conservatives and organize support for the Tories among the Irish Catholic community. In 1871, he was appointed to the Senate of Canada as a Liberal-Conservative and served in Sir John A. Macdonald's cabinet from 1882 to 1891 as minister without portfolio. He continued in the cabinet when Sir John Joseph Caldwell Abbott became prime ministare and served as Minister of Public Works, and Controller of Customs (Acting) from 1891 to 1892 following the resignation of Sir Hector-Louis Langevin. Due to age and poor health he declined to continue in cabinet when Sir John Sparrow David Thompson became prime minister in 1892. Following Thompson's death in December 1892, Governor General Lord Aberdeen invited Smith to become prime minister but he declined. He agreed, however, to return to cabinet as a minister without portfolio under Mackenzie Bowell and then Sir Charles Tupper until the Conservatives were defeated in the 1896 federal election.

In politics, Smith was an advocate of the rights of Irish Catholics and lobbied for the appointment of Irish Catholics to patronage positions. In 1872, he lobbied Macdonald for the gradual release of Fenian raiders who had attempted military attacks on Canadian soil in order to promote Irish independence.

Smith was created a Knight Bachelor in June 1894.

== Family ==
Sir Frank Smith and his wife Mary Teresa O'Higgins (1832–1896) had five children together: James Austin Smith, Hugh Harvey Smith, Marcella Clara Smith, Frances Anastasia Smith, and Gertrude Anne Smith.

On 5 June 1888, Smith's son James Austin Smith married Mary "Minnie" Alice Ryan, daughter of Canadian railway magnate Hugh Ryan, with the ceremony conducted by Bishop Timothy O'Mahony at Our Lady of Lourdes, followed by a lavish ceremony in York, Ontario.

On 12 October 1892, Smith's daughter Frances Anastasia Smith married Major Arthur B. Harrison of the 10th Royal Grenadiers in York, Ontario.

== See also ==
- John B Mather
