= Minister of Health (Canada) =

Minister in the Cabinet of Canada

- Ministre de la Santé
- Incumbent; Marjorie Michel since May 13, 2025
- Health Canada
- Style: The Honourable
- Member of: House of Commons; Privy Council; Cabinet
- Reports to: Parliament; Prime Minister
- Appointer: Monarch (represented by the governor general); on the advice of the prime minister
- Term length: At His Majesty's pleasure
- Inaugural holder: David Dingwall
- Formation: July 12, 1996
- Salary: CA$299,900 (2024)
- Website: www.hc-sc.gc.ca

The minister of health (French: ministre de la santé) is the minister of the Crown in the Canadian Cabinet who is responsible for overseeing health-focused government agencies including Health Canada and the Public Health Agency of Canada, as well as enforcing the Canada Health Act, the law governing Canada's universal health care system.

The current minister is Marjorie Michel.

The minister is responsible for the federal government's Health Portfolio, which comprises:

- Canadian Food Inspection Agency
- Canadian Institutes of Health Research
- Health Canada
- Patented Medicine Prices Review Board
- Public Health Agency of Canada

As of 2023, the Health Portfolio consists of approximately 12,000 full-time equivalent employees and an annual budget of over $3.8 billion. The position of associate minister of health (French: ministre associée de la santé) existed from 2021 to 2023.

== History ==
The first Department of Health in Canada was established in 1919 (during a time Canada would be dealing with the Spanish flu, which took the lives of 50,000 by 1920), and unlike most other departments, had no designated minister. The president of the Privy Council was the first designated to manage the department, which was followed by the minister of immigration and colonization in 1921 under Arthur Meighen, then the minister of soldiers' civil re-establishment later that year under William Lyon Mackenzie King. The minister of soldiers' civil re-establishment managed the Department of Health through the next Meighen and King governments.

In 1928, the Department of Health and minister of soldiers' civil re-establishment were abolished and replaced with the Department and minister of pensions and national health. In 1944, the position was again split into two roles, with the war veteran portfolio going to the minister of veterans affairs, and the rest of the portfolio moving to the minister of national health and welfare.

The role of minister of national health and welfare was abolished in 1996, and replaced with the current minister of health. Jane Philpott was the first medical doctor to hold the post.

The position of associate minister of health was created on October 26, 2021, for Carolyn Bennett. Ya'ara Saks was the second and last minister of mental health and addictions. She was appointed on July 26, 2023, and concurrently served as the minister of mental health and addictions. The position was abolished on March 14, 2025, at the start of the 30th Canadian Ministry.

== List of ministers ==
Key:

Liberal Party of Canada
Conservative Party of Canada

No.	Portrait	Name	Term of office		Party	Ministry
Minister presiding over the Department of Health						
	While President of Privy Council					
		Newton Rowell	6 June 1919	10 July 1920	Unionist	10th (Borden)
	While Minister of Immigration and Colonization					
		James Alexander Calder	10 July 1920	21 September 1921	National Liberal & Conservative	11 (Meighen)
		John Wesley Edwards	21 September 1921	29 December 1921	National Liberal & Conservative	11 (Meighen)
	While Minister of Soldiers' Civil Re-establishment					
		Henri Sévérin Béland	29 December 1921	15 April 1926	Liberal	12 (King)
		John Campbell Elliott	15 April 1926	29 June 1926	Liberal	12 (King)
		Robert James Manion (acting)	29 June 1926	13 July 1926	Conservative	13 (Meighen)
		Raymond Ducharme Morand (acting)	3 July 1926	23 August 1926:	Conservative	13 (Meighen)
		Eugène Paquet	23 August 1926	25 September 1926	Conservative	13 (Meighen)
		James Horace King	25 September 1926	11 June 1928	Liberal	14 (King)
Minister of Pensions and National Health						
		Murray MacLaren	7 August 1930	17 November 1934	Conservative	15 (Bennett)
		Donald Matheson Sutherland	17 November 1934	23 October 1935	Conservative	15 (Bennett)
		Charles Gavan Power	23 October 1935	19 September 1939	Liberal	16 (King)
		Ian Alistair Mackenzie	19 September 1939	18 October 1944	Liberal	16 (King)
Minister of National Health and Welfare					Liberal	16 (King)
		Brooke Claxton	18 October 1944	12 December 1946	Liberal	16 (King)
		Paul Martin Sr.	12 December 1946	15 November 1948	Liberal	16 (King)
		Paul Martin Sr.	15 November 1948	21 June 1957	Liberal	17 (St. Laurent)
		Alfred Johnson Brooks (acting)	21 June 1957	22 August 1957	Progressive; Conservative	18 (Diefenbaker)
		Jay Monteith	22 August 1957	22 April 1963	Progressive; Conservative	18 (Diefenbaker)
		Judy LaMarsh	22 April 1963	18 December 1965	Liberal	19 (Pearson)
		Allan MacEachen	18 December 1965	20 April 1968	Liberal	19 (Pearson)
		Allan MacEachen	20 April 1968	6 July 1968	Liberal	20 (PE Trudeau)
		John Munro	6 July 1968	27 November 1972	Liberal	20 (PE Trudeau)
		Marc Lalonde	27 November 1972	16 September 1977	Liberal	20 (PE Trudeau)
		Monique Bégin	16 September 1977	4 June 1979	Liberal	20 (PE Trudeau)
		David Crombie	4 June 1979	3 March 1980	Progressive; Conservative	21 (Clark)
		Monique Bégin	3 March 1980	30 June 1984	Liberal	22 (PE Trudeau)
		Monique Bégin	30 June 1984	17 September 1984	Liberal	23 (Turner)
		Jake Epp	17 September 1984	30 January 1989	Progressive; Conservative	24 (Mulroney)
		Perrin Beatty	30 January 1989	21 April 1991	Progressive; Conservative	24 (Mulroney)
		Benoît Bouchard	21 April 1991	25 June 1993	Progressive; Conservative	24 (Mulroney)
		Mary Collins	25 June 1993	4 November 1993	Progressive; Conservative	25 (Campbell)
		Diane Marleau	4 November 1993	24 January 1996:	Liberal	26 (Chrétien)
		David Dingwall	25 January 1996	11 July 1996	Liberal	26 (Chrétien)
Minister of Health					Liberal	26 (Chrétien)
1		David Dingwall	July 12, 1996	June 10, 1997	Liberal	26 (Chrétien)
2		Allan Rock	June 11, 1997	January 14, 2002	Liberal	26 (Chrétien)
3		Anne McLellan	January 15, 2002	December 11, 2003	Liberal	26 (Chrétien)
4		Pierre Pettigrew	December 12, 2003	July 19, 2004	Liberal	27 (Martin)
5		Ujjal Dosanjh	July 20, 2004	February 5, 2006	Liberal	27 (Martin)
6		Tony Clement	February 6, 2006	October 29, 2008	Conservative	28 (Harper)
7		Leona Aglukkaq	October 30, 2008	July 15, 2013	Conservative	28 (Harper)
8		Rona Ambrose	July 15, 2013	November 4, 2015	Conservative	28 (Harper)
9		Jane Philpott	November 4, 2015	August 28, 2017	Liberal	29 (J. Trudeau)
10		Ginette Petitpas Taylor	August 28, 2017	November 20, 2019	Liberal	29 (J. Trudeau)
11		Patty Hajdu	November 20, 2019	October 26, 2021	Liberal	29 (J. Trudeau)
12		Jean-Yves Duclos	October 26, 2021	July 26, 2023	Liberal	29 (J. Trudeau)
13		Mark Holland	July 26, 2023	March 14, 2025	Liberal	29 (J. Trudeau)
14		Kamal Khera	March 14, 2025	May 13, 2025	Liberal	30 (M. Carney)
15		Marjorie Michel	May 13, 2025	Incumbent	Liberal	30 (M. Carney)

== Health Portfolio ==
The Health Portfolio is an institution of several governmental departments that supports the Minister of Health's responsibility of maintaining and improving the health of Canadians.

Along with Health Canada, the portfolio consists of: the Public Health Agency of Canada (PHAC), Canadian Institutes of Health Research, Patented Medicine Prices Review Board. and the Canadian Food Inspection Agency.

As of 2023, the Health Portfolio consists of approximately 12,000 full-time equivalent employees and an annual budget of over $3.8 billion.

=== Departmental hierarchies ===
The hierarchy of portfolio organizations are listed below.

Health Canada
- Minister of Health
  - Deputy Minister
    - Chief Medical Advisor
    - Director General, Office of Audit and Evaluation
      - Departmental Audit Committee
      - Internal Audit and Special Examinations
      - Program Evaluation Division
      - Performance Measurement Planning and Integration
      - Practice Management
    - Health Products and Food Branch
      - Director General, Biologics & Genetic Therapies Directorate
      - Director General, Food Directorate
        - Bureau of Chemical Safety
        - Bureau of Nutritional Sciences
        - Bureau of Microbial Hazards
        - Bureau of Policy Intergovernmental & International Affairs
        - Bureau of Food Surveillance & Science Integration
        - Bureau of Business Systems & Operations
      - Director General, Marketed Health Products Directorate
        - Bureau of Strategic Engagement and Integrated Management Services
        - Health Products Surveillance and Epidemiology Bureau
        - Marketed Biologicals, Biotechnology and Natural Health Products Bureau
        - Marketed Pharmaceuticals Bureau
        - Office of Policy, Risk Advisory, & Advertising
      - Director General, Medical Devices Directorate
        - Bureau of Licensing Services
        - Bureau of Investigation Testing Authorization, Special Access Program & Post-Market Surveillance
        - Bureau of Evaluation
        - Bureau of Planning & Operations
        - Bureau of Policy & International Programs
      - Director General, Natural & Non-prescription Health Products Directorate
        - Bureau of Licensing Services & Systems
        - Bureau of Product Review & Assessment
        - Bureau of Strategic Planning & Business Services
        - Bureau of Program Policy, Risk Management & Stakeholder Engagement
        - Bureau of Consumer Health Product Modernization
      - Director General, Office of Nutrition Policy & Promotion
      - Director General, Policy, Planning & International Affairs Directorate
        - Strategic Horizontal Policy Division
        - Office of Legislative and Regulatory Modernization
      - Director General, Resource Management & Operations Directorate
        - Strategic Planning and Accountability Division
        - Operational Management and Scientific Learning Division
        - Transformation and Business Informatics Division
        - Governance and Internal Communications Division
        - Office of Submissions and Intellectual Property
      - Director General, Therapeutic Products Directorate
        - Bureau of Cardiology, Allergy & Neurological Sciences
        - Bureau of Gastroenterology, Infection and Viral Diseases
        - Bureau of Metabolism, Oncology and Reproductive Sciences
        - Bureau of Pharmaceutical Sciences
        - Bureau of Policy, Science and International Programs
        - Bureau of Medical Sciences
        - Office of Planning, Performance and Review Services
        - Office of Clinical Trials
      - Director General, Veterinary Drugs Directorate
        - Human Safety Division
        - Manufacturing and Chemical Evaluation Division
        - Clinical Evaluation Division
        - Submission and Knowledge Management Division
        - Policy, Planning and International Affairs Division
    - Healthy Environments and Consumer Safety Branch
      - Director General, Consumer Product Safety Directorate
        - Director, Risk Assessment Bureau
        - Director, Risk Management Bureau
        - Director, Program Development Bureau
      - Environmental and Radiation Health Sciences Directorate
        - Office of Management Services
        - Science Secretariat
        - Director, Environmental Health Science & Research Bureau, Chemicals Surveillance Bureau
        - Director, Radiation Protection Bureau
        - Director, Consumer & Clinical Radiation Protection Bureau
      - Director General, Policy Planning and Integration Directorate
      - Director General, Safe Environments Directorate
    - Opioid Response Team
      - Controlled Substances Directorate
      - Opioid Response Team Directorate
  - Assistant Deputy Minister
    - Regulatory Operations and Enforcement Branch
      - Cannabis Directorate
      - Laboratories Directorate
      - Planning and Operations Directorate
      - Health Product Compliance Directorate
      - Policy and Regulatory Strategies Directorate
      - Medical Devices and Clinical Compliance Directorate
      - Consumer Product Safety, Tobacco and Pesticides Directorate
      - Controlled Substances and Environmental Health Directorate
    - Communications & Public Affairs Branch
      - Ethics & Internal Ombudsman Services
      - Marketing and Communications Services Directorate
      - Planning & Operations Division
      - Public Affairs & Strategic Communications Directorate
      - Stakeholder Relations & Consultation Directorate
    - Pest Management Regulatory Agency
    - Strategic Policy Branch
    - Controlled Substances and Cannabis Branch
    - Corporate Services Branch
    - Departmental Secretariat
  - Executive Director & Senior General Counsel, Legal Services
  - Chief Financial Officer Branch
    - Departmental Performance Measurement & Evaluation Directorate
    - Departmental Resource Management Directorate
    - Financial Operations Directorate
      - Exec. Director, Financial Management
      - Accounting Operations & Systems
      - Financial Services Division, First Nations & Inuit Health Branch
      - Public Accounts & Policy
    - Internal Control Division
    - Materiel & Assets Management Directorate
    - Planning & Corporate Management Practices Directorate
Canadian Food Inspection Agency
President of the Canadian Food Inspection Agency
- Vice-President, Operations
- Assoc. Vice-President, Operations
- Vice-President, Science
  - Chief Veterinary Officer
  - Chief Science Operating Officer
- Vice-President, Policy & Programs
  - Chief Food Safety Officer (Exec. Director, Food Safety & Consumer Protection Division)
  - Chief Plant Health Officer (Exec. Director, Plant Health & Biosecurity Directorate)
  - VP, Innovation, Business & Service Development
    - Chief Information Officer
  - VP, Communications & Public Affairs
  - VP, Human Resources
  - VP, Corporate Management
    - Chief Financial Officer
    - Assistant Deputy Minister, International Affairs Branch
    - Chief, Audit & Evaluation
    - Chief Redress Officer, Integrity and Redress Secretariat
    - Exec. Director, Legal Services
Executive Vice President
Chief of Staff
Canadian Institutes of Health Research (CIHR)
- President of the Canadian Institutes of Health Research
  - Executive Vice-President
    - Assoc. VP, Research, Knowledge Translation & Ethics
    - Assoc. VP, Governance & External Relations
    - Assoc. VP, Corporate Services
  - VP, Research Programs
    - Assoc. VP, Research Programs – Strategy
  - Science Council (chaired by the President)
  - Governing Council (President is an ex officio member of all Standing Committees)
    - Chair
    - Vice Chair
      - Executive Committee
      - Governance and Nominating Committee
      - Standing Committee on Ethics
      - Standing Committee on Finance
      - CIHR Audit Committee
      - Stem Cell Oversight Committee

CIHR Institutes

  - Scientific Director, Institute of Aging
  - Scientific Director, Institute of Cancer Research
  - Scientific Director, Institute of Circulatory and Respiratory Health
  - Scientific Director, Institute of Gender and Health
  - Scientific Director, Institute of Genetics
  - Scientific Director, Institute of Health Services and Policy Research
  - Scientific Director, Institute of Human Development, Child and Youth Health
  - Scientific Director, Institute of Indigenous Peoples' Health
  - Scientific Director, Institute of Infection and Immunity
  - Scientific Director, Institute of Musculoskeletal Health and Arthritis
  - Scientific Director, Institute of Neurosciences, Mental Health and Addiction
  - Scientific Director, Institute of Nutrition, Metabolism and Diabetes
  - Scientific Director, Institute of Population and Public Health
Patented Medicine Prices Review Board
- Chairperson
  - Members
  - Vice Chairperson
  - Executive Director
    - General Counsel
    - Director Board Secretariat
    - Director, Policy and Economic Analysis
    - Director, Regulatory Affairs and Outreach
    - Director, Corporate Services

The Public Health Agency of Canada's (PHAC) senior leadership includes the Minister of Health, Associate Minister of Health, Minister of Mental Health and Addictions, Chief Public Health Officer, President of PHAC, and the Executive Vice-President of PHAC.

== See also ==
- Health Canada
- Healthcare in Canada
- Associate Minister of Health
- Minister of Mental Health and Addictions
- Chief Public Health Officer
