= 15th Canadian Ministry =

Government cabinet of Canada (1930–1935)

15th Canadian Ministry 15e conseil des ministres du Canada
- 15th ministry of Canada

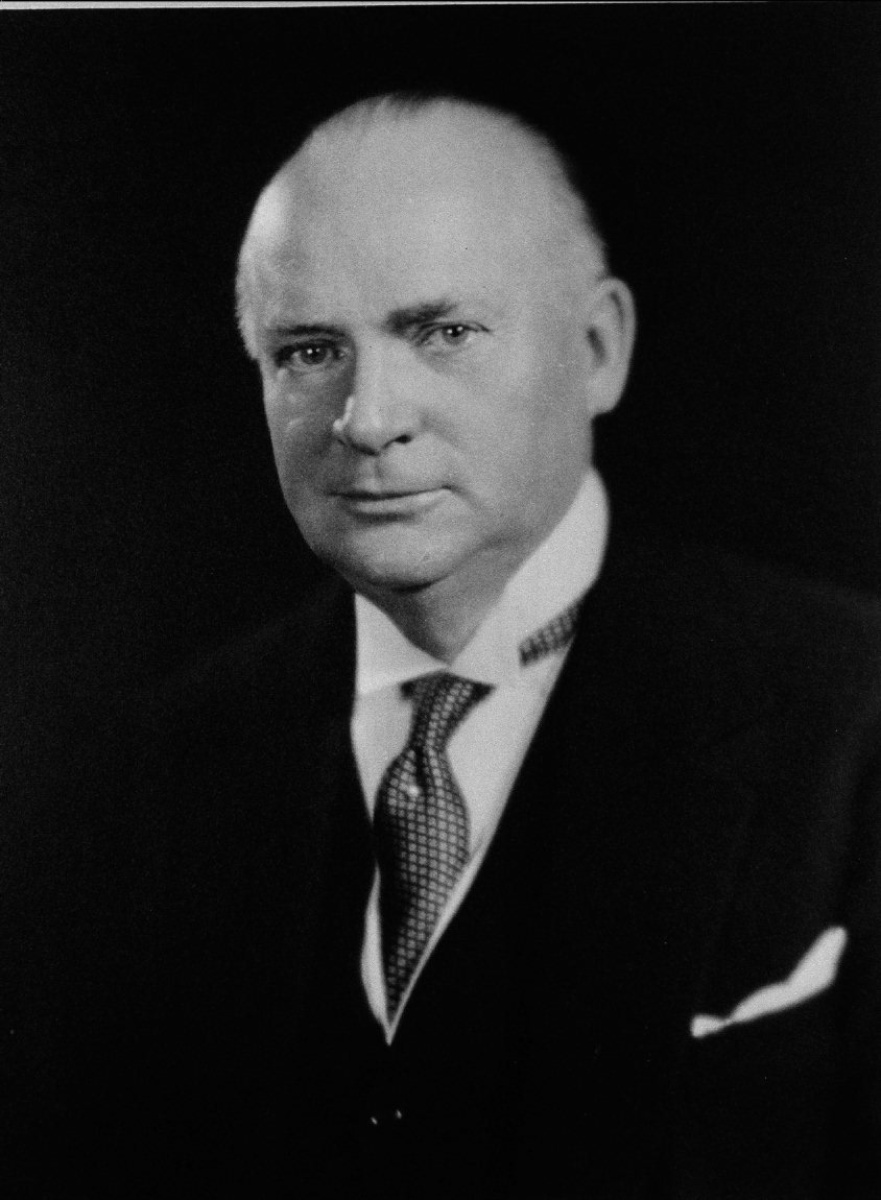
- Date formed: 7 August 1930
- Date dissolved: 23 October 1935

People and organizations
- Monarch: George V
- Governor General: Marquess of Willingdon; Earl Bessborough
- Prime Minister: R. B. Bennett
- Member party: Conservative Party (historical)
- Status in legislature: Majority
- Opposition party: Liberal Party of Canada
- Opposition leader: William Lyon Mackenzie King

History
- Election: 1930
- Outgoing election: 1935
- Legislature term: 17th Canadian Parliament
- Predecessor: 14th Canadian Ministry
- Successor: 16th Canadian Ministry

The Fifteenth Canadian Ministry was the cabinet chaired by Prime Minister R. B. Bennett. It governed Canada from 7 August 1930 to 23 October 1935, including only the 17th Canadian Parliament. The government was formed by the old Conservative Party of Canada.

== Ministers ==
| Portfolio | Minister | Term | |
| Portfolio | Minister | Start | End |
|---|---|---|---|
| Prime Minister | R. B. Bennett | 7 August 1930 | 23 October 1935 |
| Minister of Agriculture | Vacant (Joseph Hiram Grisdale was acting) | 7 August 1930 | 8 August 1930 |
| Minister of Agriculture | Robert Weir | 8 August 1930 | 23 October 1935 |
| Secretary of State for External Affairs | R. B. Bennett | 7 August 1930 | 23 October 1935 |
| Minister of Finance and Receiver General | R. B. Bennett | 7 August 1930 | 3 February 1932 |
| Minister of Finance and Receiver General | Edgar Nelson Rhodes | 3 February 1932 | 23 October 1935 |
| Minister of Fisheries | Edgar Nelson Rhodes | 7 August 1930 | 3 February 1932 |
| Minister of Fisheries | Alfred Duranleau (acting) | 3 February 1932 | 17 November 1934 |
| Minister of Fisheries | Grote Stirling (acting) | 17 November 1934 | 14 August 1935 |
| Minister of Fisheries | William Gordon Ernst | 14 August 1935 | 23 October 1935 |
| Minister of Immigration and Colonization | Wesley Ashton Gordon | 7 August 1930 | 3 February 1932 |
| Minister of Immigration and Colonization | Wesley Ashton Gordon (acting) | 3 February 1932 | 23 October 1935 |
| Minister of the Interior and Superintendent-General of Indian Affairs | Thomas Gerow Murphy | 8 August 1930 | 23 October 1935 |
| Minister of Justice and Attorney General | Hugh Guthrie | 7 August 1930 | 14 August 1935 |
| Minister of Justice and Attorney General | George Reginald Geary | 14 August 1935 | 23 October 1935 |
| Minister of Labour | Lucien Henri Gendron | 7 August 1930 | 3 February 1932 |
| Minister of Labour | Wesley Ashton Gordon | 3 February 1932 | 23 October 1935 |
| Leader of the Government in the Senate | Wellington Willoughby | 7 August 1930 | 3 February 1932 |
| Leader of the Government in the Senate | Arthur Meighen | 3 February 1932 | 23 October 1935 |
| Minister of Marine | Alfred Duranleau | 7 August 1930 | 20 July 1935 |
| Minister of Marine | Vacant (William Ambrose Found was acting) | 20 July 1935 | 30 August 1935 |
| Minister of Marine | Lucien Henri Gendron | 30 August 1935 | 23 October 1935 |
| Minister of Mines | Wesley Ashton Gordon | 8 August 1930 | 23 October 1935 |
| Minister of National Defence | Donald Matheson Sutherland | 7 August 1930 | 17 November 1934 |
| Minister of National Defence | Grote Stirling | 17 November 1934 | 23 October 1935 |
| Minister of National Revenue | Edmond Baird Ryckman | 7 August 1930 | 6 December 1933 |
| Minister of National Revenue | Robert Charles Matthews | 6 December 1933 | 14 August 1935 |
| Minister of National Revenue | Earl Lawson | 14 August 1935 | 23 October 1935 |
| Minister of Pensions and National Health | Murray MacLaren | 7 August 1930 | 17 November 1934 |
| Minister of Pensions and National Health | Donald Matheson Sutherland | 17 November 1934 | 23 October 1935 |
| Postmaster General | Arthur Sauvé | 7 August 1930 | 16 August 1935 |
| Postmaster General | Samuel Gobeil | 16 August 1935 | 23 October 1935 |
| President of the Queen's Privy Council | R. B. Bennett | 7 August 1930 | 23 October 1935 |
| Minister of Public Works | Hugh Alexander Stewart | 7 August 1930 | 23 October 1935 |
| Minister of Railways and Canals | Robert James Manion | 7 August 1930 | 23 October 1935 |
| Secretary of State for Canada and Registrar General | Charles Cahan | 7 August 1930 | 23 October 1935 |
| Solicitor General | Maurice Dupré | 7 August 1930 | 23 October 1935 |
| Minister of Trade and Commerce | Henry Herbert Stevens | 7 August 1930 | 27 October 1934 |
| Minister of Trade and Commerce | Vacant (William Grannis Parmelee was acting) | 27 October 1934 | 17 November 1934 |
| Minister of Trade and Commerce | Richard Hanson | 17 November 1934 | 23 October 1935 |
| Minister without Portfolio | John Alexander Macdonald | 7 August 1930 | 14 August 1935 |
| Minister without Portfolio | Sir George Halsey Perley | 7 August 1930 | 23 October 1935 |
| Minister without Portfolio | Arthur Meighen | 3 February 1932 | 23 October 1935 |
| Minister without Portfolio | Onésime Gagnon | 30 August 1935 | 23 October 1935 |
| Minister without Portfolio | William Earl Rowe | 30 August 1935 | 23 October 1935 |

== Succession ==
Ministries of Canada
| Preceded by 14th Canadian Ministry | 15th Canadian Ministry; 1930–1935 | Succeeded by 16th Canadian Ministry |
