= 14th Canadian Ministry =

Government cabinet of Canada (1926–1930)

14th Canadian Ministry 14e conseil des ministres du Canada
- 14th ministry of Canada

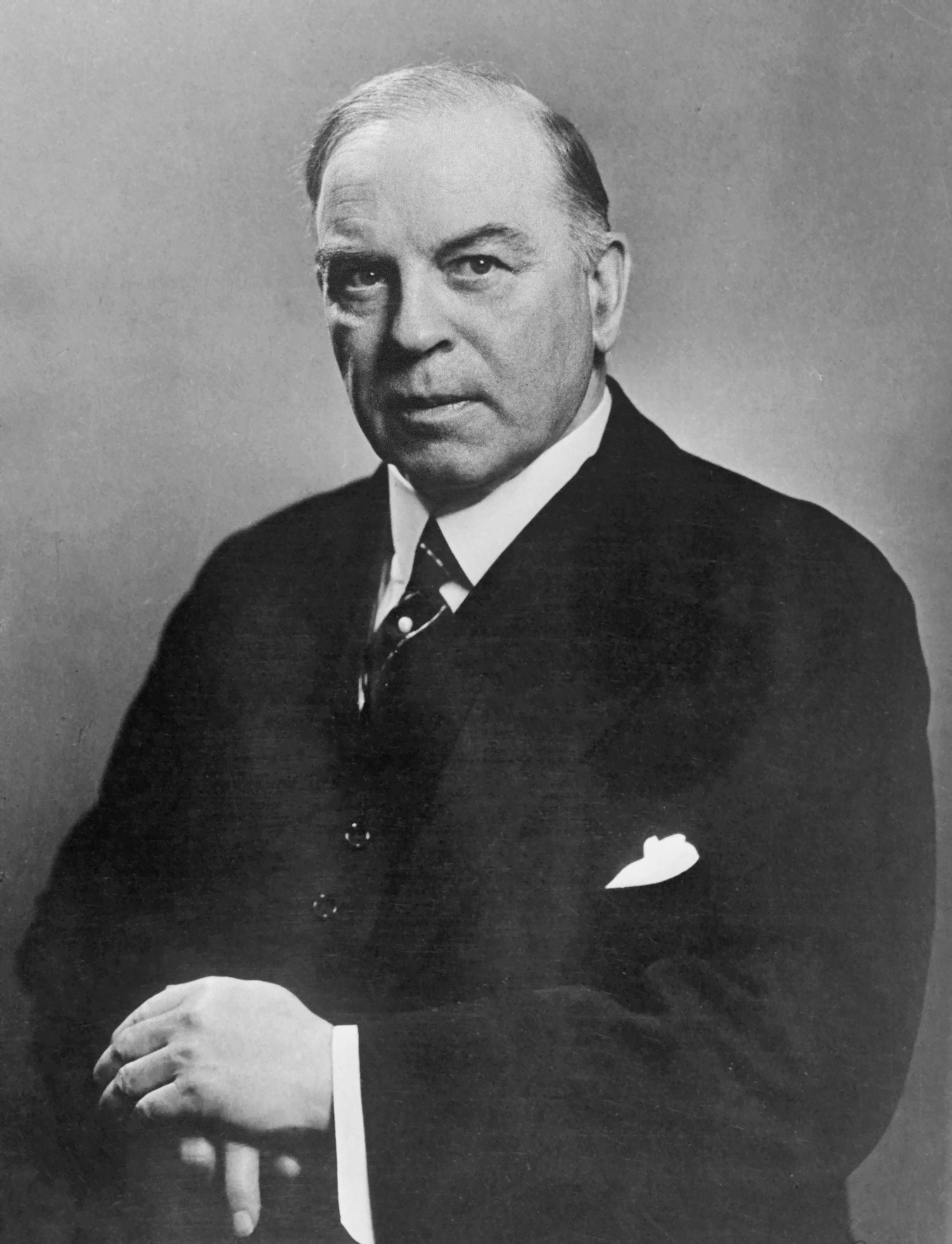
- Date formed: 25 September 1926
- Date dissolved: 7 August 1930

People and organizations
- Monarch: George V
- Governor General: Marquess of Willingdon
- Prime Minister: William Lyon Mackenzie King
- Member party: Liberal
- Status in legislature: Minority
- Opposition party: Conservative
- Opposition leader: Hugh Guthrie (1926–1927); R. B. Bennett (1927–1930)

History
- Election: 1926
- Outgoing election: 1930
- Legislature term: 16th Canadian Parliament
- Predecessor: 13th Canadian Ministry
- Successor: 15th Canadian Ministry

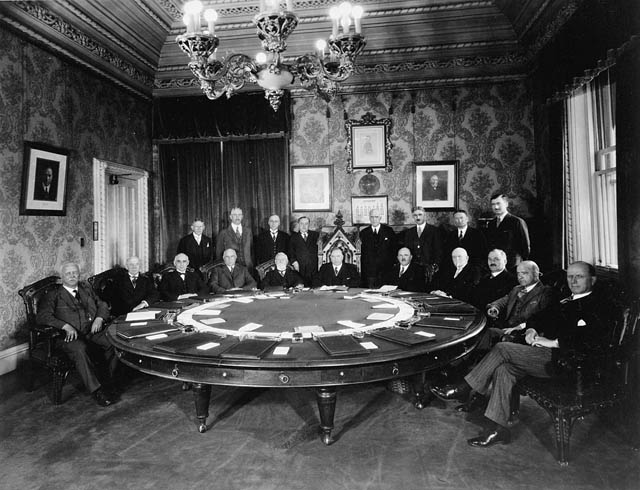
A meeting of the Cabinet of Mackenzie King, 1930

The Fourteenth Canadian Ministry was the second cabinet chaired by Prime Minister William Lyon Mackenzie King. It governed Canada from 25 September 1926 to 7 August 1930, including only the 16th Canadian Parliament. The government was formed by the Liberal Party of Canada. Mackenzie King was also Prime Minister in the Twelfth and Sixteenth Canadian Ministries.

== Ministers ==
- Prime Minister
  - 25 September 1926 – 7 August 1930: William Lyon Mackenzie King
- Minister of Agriculture
  - 25 September 1926 – 7 August 1930: William Richard Motherwell
- Minister of Customs and Excise
  - 25 September 1926 – 31 March 1927: William Daum Euler
- Secretary of State for External Affairs
  - 25 September 1926 – 7 August 1930: William Lyon Mackenzie King
- Minister of Finance
  - 25 September 1926 – 12 November 1929: James Robb
  - 12 November 1929 – 26 November 1929: Vacant (John C. Saunders was acting)
  - 26 November 1929 – 7 August 1930: Charles Avery Dunning
- Receiver General of Canada
  - 25 September 1926 – 7 August 1930: The Minister of Finance (Ex officio)
    - 25 September 1926 – 12 November 1929: James Robb
    - 12 November 1929 – 26 November 1929: Vacant (John C. Saunders was acting)
    - 26 November 1929 – 7 August 1930: Charles Avery Dunning
- Minister of Fisheries
  - 14 June 1930 – 17 June 1930: Vacant (William Ambrose Found was acting)
  - 17 June 1930 – 7 August 1930: Cyrus Macmillan
- Minister presiding over the Department of Health
  - 25 September 1926 – 11 June 1928: James Horace King
- Minister of Immigration and Colonization
  - 25 September 1926 – 30 December 1929: Robert Forke
  - 30 December 1930 – 27 June 1930: Charles Stewart (acting)
  - 27 June 1930 – 7 August 1930: Ian Alistair Mackenzie
- Superintendent-General of Indian Affairs
  - 25 September 1926 – 19 June 1930: Charles Stewart
  - 19 June 1930 – 27 June 1930: Charles Stewart (acting)
  - 27 June 1930 – 7 August 1930: Ian Alistair Mackenzie
- Minister of the Interior
  - 25 September 1926 – 7 August 1930: Charles Stewart
- Minister of Justice
  - 25 September 1926 – 7 August 1930: Ernest Lapointe
- Attorney General of Canada
  - 25 September 1926 – 7 August 1930: The Minister of Justice (Ex officio)
    - 25 September 1926 – 7 August 1930: Ernest Lapointe
- Minister of Labour
  - 25 September 1926 – 7 August 1930: Peter Heenan
- Leader of the Government in the Senate
  - 25 September 1926 – 7 August 1930: Raoul Dandurand
- Minister of Marine
  - 14 June 1930 – 7 August 1930: Pierre Joseph Arthur Cardin
- Minister of Marine and Fisheries
  - 25 September 1926 – 14 June 1930: Pierre Joseph Arthur Cardin
- Minister of Mines
  - 25 September 1926 – 7 August 1930: Charles Stewart
- Minister of National Defence
  - 25 September 1926 – 1 October 1926: Vacant (George Joseph Desbarats was acting)
  - 1 October 1926 – 8 October 1926: James Robb (acting)
  - 8 October 1926 – 7 August 1930: James Ralston
- Minister of National Revenue
  - 31 March 1927 – 7 August 1930: William Daum Euler
- Minister of Pensions and National Health
  - 11 June 1928 – 19 June 1930: James Horace King
  - 19 June 1930 – 7 August 1930: James Ralston
- Postmaster General
  - 25 September 1926 – 7 August 1930: Peter Veniot
- President of the Privy Council
  - 25 September 1926 – 7 August 1930: William Lyon Mackenzie King
- Minister of Public Works
  - 25 September 1926 – 7 August 1930: John Campbell Elliott
- Minister of Railways and Canals
  - 25 September 1926 – 26 November 1929: Charles Avery Dunning
  - 26 November 1929 – 30 December 1929: Charles Avery Dunning (acting)
  - 30 December 1929 – 7 August 1930: Thomas Crerar
- Secretary of State of Canada
  - 25 September 1926 – 7 August 1930: Fernand Rinfret
- Registrar General of Canada
  - 25 September 1926 – 7 August 1930: The Secretary of State of Canada (Ex officio)
    - 25 September 1926 – 7 August 1930: Fernand Rinfret
- Minister of Soldiers' Civil Re-establishment
  - 25 September 1926 – 11 June 1928: James Horace King
- Solicitor General of Canada
  - 25 September 1926 – 7 August 1930: Lucien Cannon
- Minister of Trade and Commerce
  - 25 September 1926 – 7 August 1930: James Malcolm
- Minister without Portfolio
  - 25 September 1926 – 7 August 1930: Raoul Dandurand
  - 17 June 1930 – 7 August 1930: William Frederic Kay

== Offices not of the Cabinet ==
Parliamentary Secretary of Soldiers' Civil Re-establishment

- 25 September 1926 – 11 June 1928: Vacant

== Succession ==
Ministries of Canada
Preceded by 13th Canadian Ministry	14th Canadian Ministry; 1926–1930	Succeeded by 15th Canadian Ministry
