= 12th Canadian Ministry =

Government cabinet of Canada (1921–1926)

12th Canadian Ministry 12e conseil des ministres du Canada
- 12th ministry of Canada

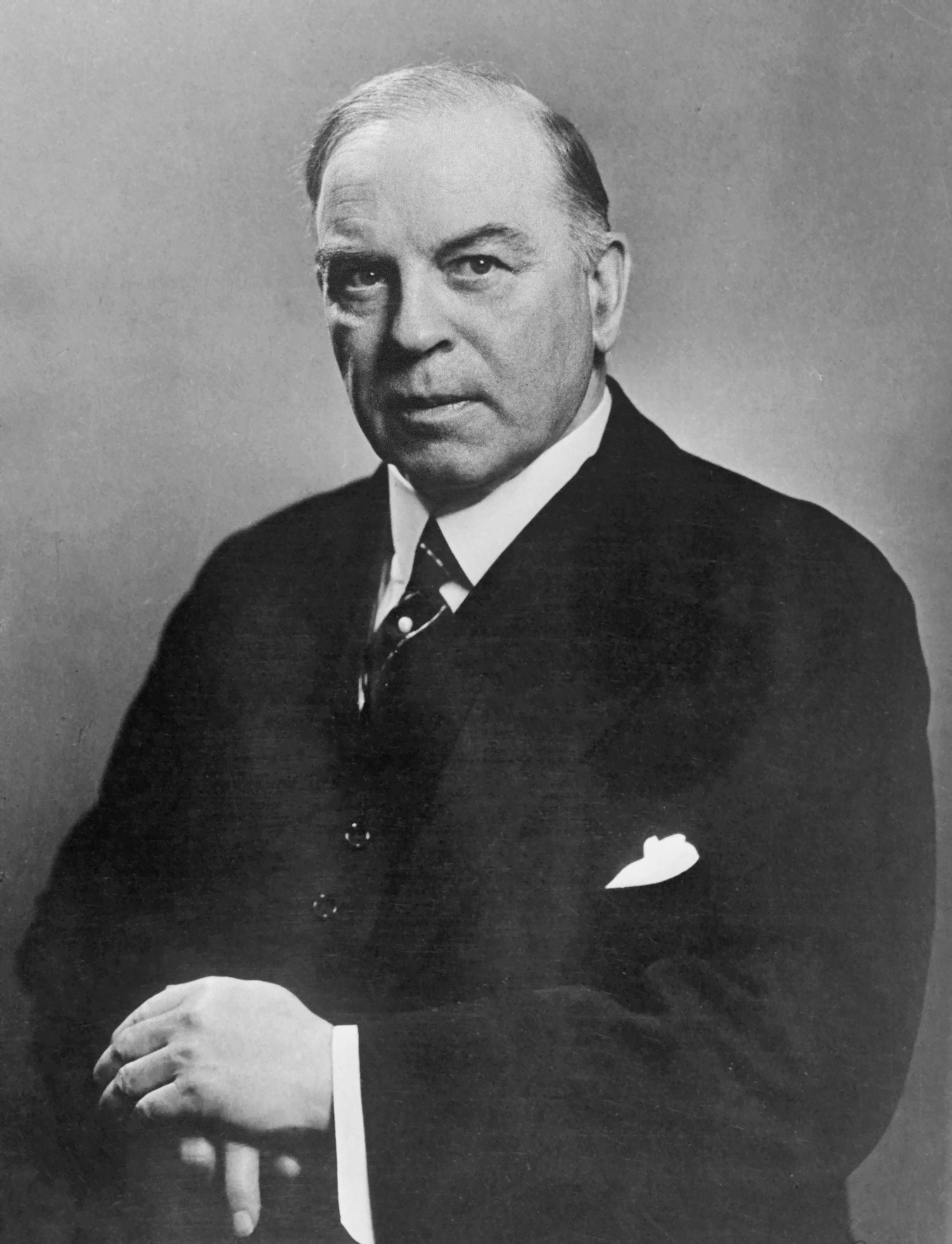
- Date formed: 29 December 1921
- Date dissolved: 28 June 1926

People and organizations
- Monarch: George V
- Governor General: Viscount Byng
- Prime Minister: William Lyon Mackenzie King
- Member party: Liberal Party of Canada
- Status in legislature: Majority (1921–1925); Minority (1925–1926)
- Opposition party: Conservative Party of Canada
- Opposition leader: Arthur Meighen

History
- Incoming formation: 1921 Canadian federal election
- Outgoing formation: King–Byng affair
- Elections: 1921, 1925
- Legislature terms: 14th Canadian Parliament; 15th Canadian Parliament
- Predecessor: 11th Canadian Ministry
- Successor: 13th Canadian Ministry

The Twelfth Canadian Ministry was the first cabinet chaired by Prime Minister William Lyon Mackenzie King. It governed Canada from 29 December 1921 to 28 June 1926, including the 14th Canadian Parliament and most of the 15th. The government was formed by the Liberal Party of Canada. Mackenzie King was also Prime Minister in the Fourteenth and Sixteenth Canadian Ministries.

== Ministers ==
- Prime Minister
  - 29 December 1921 – 29 June 1926: William Lyon Mackenzie King
- Minister of Agriculture
  - 29 December 1921 – 29 June 1926: William Richard Motherwell
- Minister of Customs and Excise
  - 29 December 1921 – 5 September 1925: Jacques Bureau
  - 5 September 1925 – 29 June 1926: Georges Henri Boivin
- Secretary of State for External Affairs
  - 29 December 1921 – 29 June 1926: William Lyon Mackenzie King
- Minister of Finance
  - 29 December 1921 – 5 September 1925: William Stevens Fielding
  - 5 September 1925 – 29 June 1926: James Robb
- Receiver General of Canada
  - 29 December 1921 – 29 June 1926: The Minister of Finance (Ex officio)
    - 29 December 1921 – 5 September 1925: William Stevens Fielding
    - 5 September 1925 – 29 June 1926: James Robb
- Minister presiding over the Department of Health
  - 29 December 1921 – 15 April 1926: Henri Sévérin Béland
  - 15 April 1926 – 29 June 1926: John Campbell Elliott
- Minister of Immigration and Colonization
  - 29 December 1921 – 3 January 1922: Vacant (William J. Black was acting)
  - 3 January 1922 – 20 February 1922: Hewitt Bostock (acting)
  - 20 February 1922 – 17 August 1923: Charles Stewart
  - 17 August 1923 – 7 September 1925: James Robb
  - 7 September 1925 – 13 November 1925: George Newcombe Gordon
  - 13 November 1925 – 29 June 1926: Charles Stewart (acting)
- Superintendent-General of Indian Affairs
  - 29 December 1921 – 29 June 1926: The Minister of the Interior (Ex officio)
    - 29 December 1921 – 29 June 1926: Charles Stewart
- Minister of the Interior
  - 29 December 1921 – 29 June 1926: Charles Stewart
- Minister of Justice
  - 29 December 1921 – 4 January 1924: Sir Jean Lomer Gouin
  - 4 January 1924 – 30 January 1924: Ernest Lapointe (acting)
  - 30 January 1924 – 29 June 1926: Ernest Lapointe
- Attorney General of Canada
  - 29 December 1921 – 28 June 1926: The Minister of Justice (Ex officio)
    - 29 December 1921 – 4 January 1924: Lomer Gouin
    - 4 January 1924 – 30 January 1924: Ernest Lapointe (acting)
    - 30 January 1924 – 29 June 1926: Ernest Lapointe
- Minister of Labour
  - 29 December 1921 – 13 November 1925: James Murdock
  - 13 November 1925 – 8 March 1926: James Horace King (acting)
  - 8 March 1926 – 29 June 1926: John Campbell Elliott
- Leader of the Government in the Senate
  - 29 December 1921 – 29 June 1926: Raoul Dandurand
- Minister of Marine and Fisheries
  - 29 December 1921 – 30 January 1924: Ernest Lapointe
  - 30 January 1924 – 29 June 1926: Pierre Joseph Arthur Cardin
- Minister of Militia and Defence
  - 29 December 1921 – 1 January 1923: George Perry Graham
- Minister of Mines
  - 29 December 1921 – 29 June 1926: Charles Stewart
- Minister of National Defence
  - 1 January 1923 – 28 April 1923: George Perry Graham
  - 28 April 1923 – 17 August 1923: Edward Mortimer Macdonald (acting)
  - 17 August 1923 – 29 June 1926: Edward Mortimer Macdonald
- Minister of the Naval Service
  - 29 December 1921 – 1 January 1923: George Perry Graham
- Postmaster General
  - 29 December 1921 – 29 June 1926: Charles Murphy
- President of the Privy Council
  - 29 December 1921 – 29 June 1926: William Lyon Mackenzie King
- Minister of Public Works
  - 29 December 1921 – 3 February 1922: Hewitt Bostock
  - 3 February 1922 – 29 June 1926: James Horace King
- Minister of Railways and Canals
  - 29 December 1921 – 19 January 1923: William Costello Kennedy
  - 19 January 1923 – 28 April 1923: Vacant (Graham Airdrie Bell was acting)
  - 28 April 1923 – 1 March 1926: George Perry Graham
  - 1 March 1926 – 29 June 1926: Charles Avery Dunning
- Secretary of State of Canada
  - 29 December 1921 – 26 September 1925: Arthur Bliss Copp
  - 26 September 1925 – 13 November 1925: Walter Edward Foster
  - 13 November 1925 – 24 March 1926: Charles Murphy (acting)
  - 24 March 1926 – 29 June 1926: Ernest Lapointe
- Registrar General of Canada
  - 29 December 1921 – 28 June 1926: The Secretary of State of Canada (Ex officio)
  - 29 December 1921 – 26 September 1925: Arthur Bliss Copp
  - 26 September 1925 – 13 November 1925: Walter Edward Foster
  - 13 November 1925 – 24 March 1926: Charles Murphy (acting)
  - 24 March 1926 – 29 June 1926: Ernest Lapointe
- Minister of Soldiers' Civil Re-establishment
  - 29 December 1921 – 15 April 1926: Henri Sévérin Béland
  - 15 April 1926 – 29 June 1926: John Campbell Elliott
- Solicitor General of Canada
  - 29 December 1921 – 11 April 1923: Daniel Duncan McKenzie
  - 11 April 1923 – 14 November 1923: Vacant
  - 14 November 1923 – 23 May 1925: Edward James McMurray
  - 23 May 1925 – 5 September 1925: Vacant
- Minister of Trade and Commerce
  - 29 December 1921 – 17 August 1923: James Robb
  - 17 August 1923 – 13 November 1925: Thomas Andrew Low
  - 13 November 1925 – 29 June 1926: James Robb (acting)
- Minister without Portfolio
  - 29 December 1921 – 29 June 1926: Raoul Dandurand
  - 29 December 1921 – 17 August 1923: Thomas Andrew Low
  - 30 December 1921 – 30 October 1925: John Ewen Sinclair
  - 12 April 1923 – 17 August 1923: Edward Mortimer Macdonald
  - 20 September 1924 – 30 October 1925: Harold McGiverin
  - 9 September 1925 – 7 January 1926: Herbert Meredith Marler
  - 16 September 1925 – 13 November 1925: Vincent Massey
  - 20 February 1926 – 7 April 1926: George Perry Graham

== Offices not of the Cabinet ==
Parliamentary Secretary of Soldiers' Civil Re-establishment

- 29 December 1921 – 29 June 1926: Vacant

Solicitor General of Canada

- 5 September 1925 – 29 June 1926: Lucien Cannon

== Not of the Ministry ==
Parliamentary Under Secretary of State for External Affairs

- 29 December 1921 – 27 October 1922: Lucien Turcotte Pacaud

== Succession ==
Ministries of Canada
| Preceded by 11th Canadian Ministry | 12th Canadian Ministry; 1921–1926 | Succeeded by 13th Canadian Ministry |
