= 10th Canadian Ministry =

Government cabinet of Canada (1917–1920)

10th Canadian Ministry 10e conseil des ministres du Canada
- 10th ministry of Canada

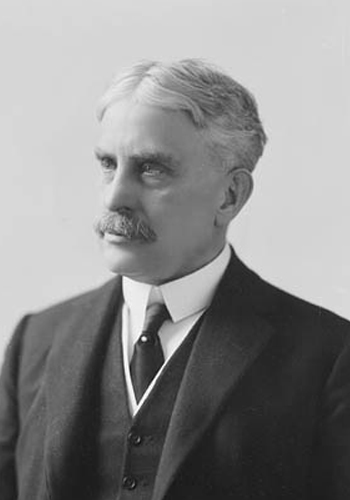
- Date formed: 12 October 1917
- Date dissolved: 10 July 1920

People and organizations
- Monarch: George V
- Governor General: Duke of Devonshire
- Prime Minister: Robert Borden
- Member party: Unionist
- Status in legislature: Majority
- Opposition party: Liberal
- Opposition leader: Wilfrid Laurier (1911–1919); Daniel Duncan McKenzie (1919); William Lyon Mackenzie King (1919–1921)

History
- Election: 1917
- Legislature term: 13th Canadian Parliament
- Predecessor: 9th Canadian Ministry
- Successor: 11th Canadian Ministry

The Tenth Canadian Ministry was the second cabinet chaired by Prime Minister Sir Robert Borden. It governed Canada from 12 October 1917 to 10 July 1920, including most of the 13th Canadian Parliament. The government was formed by the Unionists, a war-time coalition between the old Conservative Party of Canada and some members of the Liberal Party of Canada. Borden was also Prime Minister in the Ninth Canadian Ministry, but formed a coalition ministry for the 1917 Canadian federal election.

== Ministers ==
- Prime Minister
  - 12 October 1917 – 10 July 1920: Sir Robert Borden
- Minister of Agriculture
  - 12 October 1917 – 18 June 1919: Thomas Crerar
  - 18 June 1919 – 12 August 1919: James Alexander Calder (acting)
  - 12 August 1919 – 10 July 1920: Simon Fraser Tolmie
- Minister of Aviation
  - 12 October 1917 – 10 July 1920: Albert Edward Kemp
- Minister of Customs
  - 12 October 1917 – 18 May 1918: Arthur Lewis Sifton
- Minister of Customs and Inland Revenue
  - 18 May 1918 – 2 September 1919: Arthur Lewis Sifton
  - 2 September 1919 – 31 December 1919: John Dowsley Reid (acting)
  - 31 December 1919 – 10 July 1920: Martin Burrell
- Secretary of State for External Affairs
  - 12 October 1917 – 10 July 1920: Sir Robert Borden
- Minister of Finance
  - 12 October 1917 – 2 August 1919: Sir William Thomas White
  - 2 August 1919 – 10 July 1920: Sir Henry Lumley Drayton
- Receiver General of Canada
  - 12 October 1917 – 10 July 1920: The Minister of Finance (Ex officio)
    - 12 October 1917 – 2 August 1919: William Thomas White
    - 2 August 1919 – 10 July 1920: Henry Lumley Drayton
- Minister presiding over the Department of Health
  - 6 June 1919 – 10 July 1920: Newton Rowell
- Minister of Immigration and Colonization
  - 12 October 1917 – 10 July 1920: James Alexander Calder
- Superintendent-General of Indian Affairs
  - 12 October 1917 – 10 July 1920: The Minister of the Interior (Ex officio)
    - 12 October 1917 – 10 July 1920: Arthur Meighen
- Minister of Inland Revenue
  - 12 October 1917 – 1 April 1918: Albert Sévigny
  - 1 April 1918 – 14 May 1918: Vacant (Joseph Ulric Vincent was acting)
  - 14 May 1918 – 18 May 1918: Arthur Lewis Sifton
- Minister of the Interior
  - 12 October 1917 – 10 July 1920: Arthur Meighen
- Minister of Justice
  - 12 October 1917 – 10 July 1920: Charles Doherty
- Attorney General of Canada
  - 12 October 1917 – 10 July 1920: The Minister of Justice (Ex officio)
    - 12 October 1917 – 10 July 1920: Charles Doherty
- Minister of Labour
  - 12 October 1917 – 8 November 1918: Thomas Wilson Crothers
  - 8 November 1918 – 10 July 1920: Gideon Robertson
- Leader of the Government in the Senate
  - 12 October 1917 – 10 July 1920: Sir James Alexander Lougheed
- Minister of Marine and Fisheries
  - 12 October 1917 – 13 October 1917: Vacant (Alexander Johnston was acting)
  - 13 October 1917 – 10 July 1920: Charles Ballantyne
- Minister of Militia and Defence
  - 12 October 1917 – 16 January 1920: Sydney Chilton Mewburn
  - 16 January 1920 – 24 January 1920: James Alexander Calder (acting)
  - 24 January 1920 – 10 July 1920: Hugh Guthrie
- Minister of Mines
  - 12 October 1917 – 31 December 1919: Martin Burrell
  - 31 December 1919 – 10 July 1920: Arthur Meighen
- Minister of the Naval Service
  - 12 October 1917 – 13 October 1917: Vacant (George Joseph Desbarats was acting)
  - 13 October 1917 – 10 July 1920: Charles Ballantyne
- Minister of Overseas Military Forces
  - 12 October 1917 – 1 July 1920: Sir Albert Edward Kemp
- Postmaster General
  - 12 October 1917 – 10 July 1920: Pierre-Édouard Blondin
- President of the Privy Council
  - 12 October 1917 – 10 July 1920: Newton Rowell
- Minister of Public Works
  - 12 October 1917 – 13 October 1917: Charles Ballantyne
  - 13 October 1917 – 6 August 1919: Frank Broadstreet Carvell
  - 6 August 1919 – 3 September 1919: John Dowsley Reid (acting)
  - 3 September 1919 – 31 December 1919: Arthur Lewis Sifton
  - 31 December 1919 – 10 July 1920: John Dowsley Reid (acting)
- Minister of Railways and Canals
  - 12 October 1917 – 1 July 1920: John Dowsley Reid
- Secretary of State of Canada
  - 12 October 1917 – 31 December 1919: Martin Burrell
  - 31 December 1919 – 10 July 1920: Arthur Lewis Sifton
- Registrar General of Canada
  - 12 October 1917 – 10 July 1920: The Secretary of State of Canada (Ex officio)
    - 12 October 1917 – 31 December 1919: Martin Burrell
    - 31 December 1919 – 10 July 1920: Arthur Lewis Sifton
- Minister of Soldiers' Civil Re-establishment
  - 21 February 1918 – 10 July 1920: Sir James Alexander Lougheed
- Solicitor General of Canada
  - 5 July 1919 – 10 July 1920: Hugh Guthrie
- Minister of Trade and Commerce
  - 12 October 1917 – 10 July 1920: Sir George Eulas Foster
- Minister without Portfolio
  - 12 October 1917 – 22 September 1919: Francis Cochrane
  - 12 October 1917 – 21 February 1918: Sir James Alexander Lougheed
  - 23 October 1917 – 25 February 1920: Alexander Kenneth Maclean
  - 23 October 1917 – 8 November 1918: Gideon Robertson

== Offices not of the Cabinet ==
Parliamentary Undersecretary of State for External Affairs

- 12 October 1917 – 7 November 1918: Hugh Clark
- 7 November 1918 – 10 July 1920: Francis Henry Keefer

Parliamentary Secretary of Militia and Defence

- 12 October 1917 – 23 February 1918: Fleming Blanchard McCurdy
- 23 February 1918 – 7 November 1918: Vacant
- 7 November 1918 – 10 July 1920: Hugh Clark

Parliamentary Secretary of Soldiers' Civil Re-establishment

- 21 February 1918 – 23 February 1918: Vacant
- 23 February 1918 – 7 November 1918: Fleming Blanchard McCurdy
- 7 November 1918 – 10 July 1920: Vacant

Solicitor General of Canada

- 12 October 1917 – 5 July 1919: Hugh Guthrie

== Succession ==
Ministries of Canada
Preceded by 9th Canadian Ministry	10th Canadian Ministry; 1917–1920	Succeeded by 11th Canadian Ministry
