= 16th Canadian Ministry =

Government cabinet of Canada (1935–1948)

16th Canadian Ministry 16e conseil des ministres du Canada
- 16th ministry of Canada

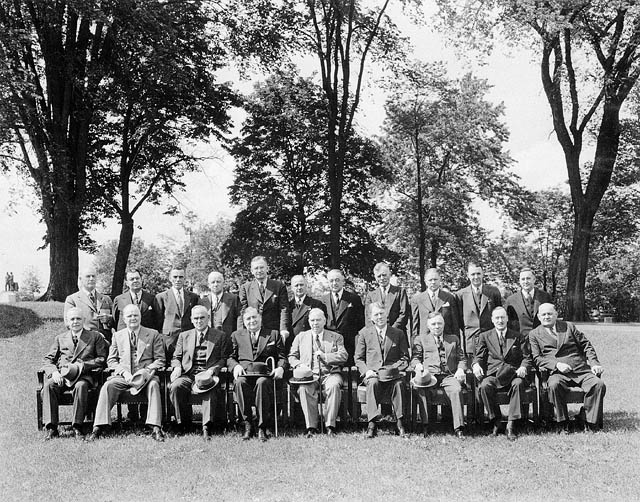
- Date formed: 23 October 1935
- Date dissolved: 15 November 1948

People and organizations
- Monarch: George V; Edward VIII; George VI
- Governor General: Earl Bessborough; John Buchan; Earl Athlone
- Prime Minister: William Lyon Mackenzie King
- Member party: Liberal Party of Canada
- Status in legislature: Majority (1935–1945); Minority (1945–1948)
- Opposition party: Conservative Party (historical) (1935–1943); Progressive Conservative Party of Canada (1943–1948)
- Opposition leader: R. B. Bennett (1935–1938); Robert James Manion (1938–1940); Richard Hanson (1940–1943); Gordon Graydon (1943–1945); John Bracken (1945–1948)

History
- Outgoing formation: 1948 Liberal leadership election
- Elections: 1935, 1940, 1945
- Legislature terms: 18th Canadian Parliament; 19th Canadian Parliament; 20th Canadian Parliament
- Predecessor: 15th Canadian Ministry
- Successor: 17th Canadian Ministry

The Sixteenth Canadian Ministry was the third cabinet chaired by Prime Minister William Lyon Mackenzie King. It governed Canada from 23 October 1935 to 15 November 1948, including all of the 18th and 19th Canadian Parliaments, as well as the beginning of the 20th. The government was formed by the Liberal Party of Canada. Mackenzie King was also Prime Minister in the Twelfth and Fourteenth Canadian Ministries.

== Ministers ==
Portfolio	Minister	Term	
Portfolio	Minister	Start	End
Prime Minister	William Lyon Mackenzie King	23 October 1935	15 November 1948
Minister of Agriculture	Vacant (George Barton was acting)	23 October 1935	25 October 1935
Minister of Agriculture	Thomas Crerar (acting)	25 October 1935	4 November 1935
Minister of Agriculture	James Garfield Gardiner	4 November 1935	15 November 1948
Minister for Canada Mortgage and Housing Corporation	C. D. Howe	1 January 1946	15 November 1948
Minister for the Canadian Wheat Board	William Daum Euler	23 October 1935	9 May 1940
Minister for the Canadian Wheat Board	James Angus MacKinnon	9 May 1940	19 January 1948
Minister for the Canadian Wheat Board	C. D. Howe	19 January 1948	15 November 1948
Secretary of State for External Affairs	William Lyon Mackenzie King	23 October 1935	4 September 1946
Secretary of State for External Affairs	Louis St. Laurent	4 September 1946	10 September 1948
Secretary of State for External Affairs	Lester B. Pearson	10 September 1948	15 November 1948
Minister of Finance and Receiver General	Charles Avery Dunning	23 October 1935	6 September 1939
Minister of Finance and Receiver General	James Ralston	6 September 1939	8 July 1940
Minister of Finance and Receiver General	James Lorimer Ilsley	8 July 1940	10 December 1946
Minister of Finance and Receiver General	Douglas Abbott	10 December 1946	15 November 1948
Minister of Fisheries	Joseph-Enoil Michaud	23 October 1935	7 October 1942
Minister of Fisheries	Ernest Bertrand	7 October 1942	30 August 1945
Minister of Fisheries	Hedley Francis Gregory Bridges	30 August 1945	11 August 1947
Minister of Fisheries	Vacant (Stewart Bates was acting)	11 August 1947	14 August 1947
Minister of Fisheries	Ernest Bertrand (acting)	14 August 1947	2 September 1947
Minister of Fisheries	Milton Fowler Gregg	2 September 1947	19 January 1948
Minister of Fisheries	James Angus MacKinnon	19 January 1948	11 June 1948
Minister of Fisheries	Robert Wellington Mayhew	11 June 1948	15 November 1948
Minister of Immigration and Colonization	Thomas Crerar	23 October 1935	1 December 1936
Minister of the Interior and Superintendent-General of Indian Affairs	Thomas Crerar	23 October 1935	1 December 1936
Minister responsible for Indian Affairs	Thomas Crerar	1 December 1936	18 April 1945
Minister responsible for Indian Affairs	James Allison Glen	18 April 1945	11 June 1948
Minister responsible for Indian Affairs	James Angus MacKinnon	11 June 1948	15 November 1948
Minister of Justice and Attorney General	Ernest Lapointe	23 October 1935	27 November 1941
Minister of Justice and Attorney General	Joseph-Enoil Michaud (acting)	27 November 1941	10 December 1941
Minister of Justice and Attorney General	Louis St. Laurent	10 December 1941	10 December 1946
Minister of Justice and Attorney General	James Lorimer Ilsley	10 December 1946	1 July 1948
Minister of Justice and Attorney General	Louis St. Laurent (acting)	1 July 1948	10 September 1948
Minister of Justice and Attorney General	Louis St. Laurent	10 September 1948	15 November 1948
Minister of Labour	Norman McLeod Rogers	23 October 1935	19 September 1939
Minister of Labour	Norman Alexander McLarty	19 September 1939	15 December 1941
Minister of Labour	Humphrey Mitchell	15 December 1941	15 November 1948
Leader of the Government in the House of Commons	Ian Alistair Mackenzie	18 October 1944	1 May 1948
Leader of the Government in the House of Commons	Alphonse Fournier	1 May 1948	15 November 1948
Leader of the Government in the Senate	Raoul Dandurand	23 October 1935	11 March 1942
Leader of the Government in the Senate	James Horace King (acting)	11 March 1942	26 May 1942
Leader of the Government in the Senate	James Horace King	26 May 1942	25 August 1945
Leader of the Government in the Senate	Wishart McLea Robertson	25 August 1945	15 November 1948
Minister of Marine	C. D. Howe	23 October 1935	2 November 1936
Minister of Mines	Thomas Crerar	23 October 1935	1 December 1936
Minister of Mines and Resources	Thomas Crerar	1 December 1936	18 April 1945
Minister of Mines and Resources	James Allison Glen	18 April 1945	11 June 1948
Minister of Mines and Resources	James Angus MacKinnon	11 June 1948	15 November 1948
Minister of Munitions and Supply	C. D. Howe	9 April 1940	1 January 1946
Associate Minister of National Defence	Charles Gavan Power	12 July 1940	27 November 1944
Associate Minister of National Defence	Vacant	27 November 1944	15 November 1948
Minister of National Defence	Ian Alistair Mackenzie	23 October 1935	19 September 1939
Minister of National Defence	Norman McLeod Rogers	19 September 1939	11 June 1940
Minister of National Defence	Charles Gavan Power (acting)	11 June 1940	5 July 1940
Minister of National Defence	James Ralston	5 July 1940	2 November 1944
Minister of National Defence	Andrew McNaughton	2 November 1944	21 August 1945
Minister of National Defence	Douglas Abbott	21 August 1945	12 December 1946
Minister of National Defence	Brooke Claxton	12 December 1946	15 November 1948
Minister of National Defence for Air	Vacant (Charles Gavan Power was acting)	22 May 1940	23 May 1940
Minister of National Defence for Air	Charles Gavan Power	23 May 1940	30 November 1944
Minister of National Defence for Air	Angus Lewis Macdonald (acting)	30 November 1944	11 January 1945
Minister of National Defence for Air	Colin W. G. Gibson (acting)	11 January 1945	8 March 1945
Minister of National Defence for Air	Colin W. G. Gibson	8 March 1945	12 December 1946
Minister of National Defence for Naval Services	Angus Lewis Macdonald	12 July 1940	18 April 1945
Minister of National Defence for Naval Services	Douglas Abbott	18 April 1945	12 December 1946
Minister of National Health and Welfare	Brooke Claxton	18 October 1944	12 December 1946
Minister of National Health and Welfare	Paul Martin Sr.	12 December 1946	15 November 1948
Minister of National Revenue	James Lorimer Ilsley	23 October 1935	8 July 1940
Minister of National Revenue	Colin W. G. Gibson	8 July 1940	8 March 1945
Minister of National Revenue	James Angus MacKinnon (acting)	8 March 1945	19 April 1945
Minister of National Revenue	David Laurence MacLaren	19 April 1945	30 July 1945
Minister of National Revenue	James Angus MacKinnon (acting)	30 July 1945	29 August 1945
Minister of National Revenue	James Joseph McCann	29 August 1945	15 November 1948
Minister of National War Services	James Garfield Gardiner	12 July 1940	11 June 1941
Minister of National War Services	Joseph Thorarinn Thorson	11 June 1941	7 October 1942
Minister of National War Services	Léo Richer Laflèche	7 October 1942	18 April 1945
Minister of National War Services	James Joseph McCann	18 April 1945	19 January 1948
Minister of National War Services	Vacant	19 January 1948	15 November 1948
Minister of Pensions and National Health	Charles Gavan Power	23 October 1935	19 September 1939
Minister of Pensions and National Health	Ian Alistair Mackenzie	19 September 1939	18 October 1944
Postmaster General	John Campbell Elliott	23 October 1935	23 January 1939
Postmaster General	Norman Alexander McLarty	23 January 1939	19 September 1939
Postmaster General	Charles Gavan Power	19 September 1939	23 May 1940
Postmaster General	James Lorimer Ilsley (acting)	23 May 1940	8 July 1940
Postmaster General	William Pate Mulock	8 July 1940	9 June 1945
Postmaster General	Vacant (Walter James Turnbull was acting)	9 June 1945	29 August 1945
Postmaster General	Ernest Bertrand	29 August 1945	15 November 1948
President of the Queen's Privy Council	William Lyon Mackenzie King	23 October 1935	15 November 1948
Minister of Public Works	Pierre Joseph Arthur Cardin	23 October 1935	13 May 1942
Minister of Public Works	Joseph-Enoil Michaud (acting)	13 May 1942	7 October 1942
Minister of Public Works	Alphonse Fournier	7 October 1942	15 November 1948
Minister of Railways and Canals	C. D. Howe	23 October 1935	2 November 1936
Minister of Reconstruction	Vacant (C. D. Howe was acting)	30 June 1944	13 October 1944
Minister of Reconstruction	C. D. Howe	13 October 1944	1 January 1946
Minister of Reconstruction and Supply	C. D. Howe	1 January 1946	15 November 1948
Secretary of State for Canada and Registrar General	Fernand Rinfret	23 October 1935	12 July 1939
Secretary of State for Canada and Registrar General	Vacant (Ephraim Herbert Coleman was acting)	12 July 1939	26 July 1939
Secretary of State for Canada and Registrar General	Ernest Lapointe (acting)	26 July 1939	9 May 1940
Secretary of State for Canada and Registrar General	Pierre-François Casgrain	9 May 1940	15 December 1941
Secretary of State for Canada and Registrar General	Norman Alexander McLarty	15 December 1941	18 April 1945
Secretary of State for Canada and Registrar General	Paul Martin Sr.	18 April 1945	12 December 1946
Secretary of State for Canada and Registrar General	Colin W. G. Gibson	12 December 1946	15 November 1948
Solicitor General	Vacant	23 October 1935	18 April 1945
Solicitor General	Joseph Jean	18 April 1945	15 November 1948
Minister of Trade and Commerce	William Daum Euler	23 October 1935	9 May 1940
Minister of Trade and Commerce	James Angus MacKinnon	9 May 1940	19 January 1948
Minister of Trade and Commerce	C. D. Howe	19 January 1948	15 November 1948
Minister of Transport	C. D. Howe	2 November 1936	8 July 1940
Minister of Transport	Pierre Joseph Arthur Cardin	8 July 1940	13 May 1942
Minister of Transport	C. D. Howe (acting)	13 May 1942	6 October 1942
Minister of Transport	Joseph-Enoil Michaud	6 October 1942	18 April 1945
Minister of Transport	Lionel Chevrier	18 April 1945	15 November 1948
Minister of Veterans Affairs	Ian Alistair Mackenzie	18 October 1944	19 January 1948
Minister of Veterans Affairs	Milton Fowler Gregg	19 January 1948	15 November 1948
Minister without Portfolio	Raoul Dandurand	23 October 1935	11 March 1942
Minister without Portfolio	James Angus MacKinnon	23 January 1939	9 May 1940
Minister without Portfolio	James Horace King	26 May 1942	25 August 1945
Minister without Portfolio	Wishart McLea Robertson	4 September 1945	15 November 1948

== Succession ==
Ministries of Canada
Preceded by 15th Canadian Ministry	16th Canadian Ministry; 1935–1948	Succeeded by 17th Canadian Ministry
