= 11th Canadian Ministry =

Government cabinet of Canada (1920–1921)

11th Canadian Ministry 11e conseil des ministres du Canada
- 11th ministry of Canada

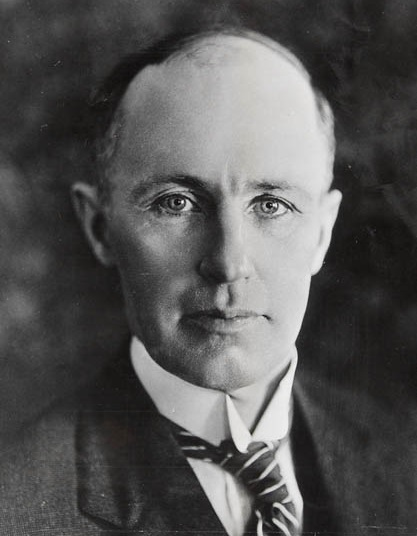
- Date formed: 10 July 1920
- Date dissolved: 29 December 1921

People and organizations
- Monarch: George V
- Governor General: Duke of Devonshire; Viscount Byng
- Prime Minister: Arthur Meighen
- Member party: National Liberal and Conservative Party
- Status in legislature: Majority
- Opposition party: Liberal Party of Canada
- Opposition leader: William Lyon Mackenzie King

History
- Incoming formation: Retirement of Robert Borden
- Outgoing formation: 1921 Canadian federal election
- Legislature term: 13th Canadian Parliament
- Predecessor: 10th Canadian Ministry
- Successor: 12th Canadian Ministry

The Eleventh Canadian Ministry was the first cabinet chaired by Prime Minister Arthur Meighen. It governed Canada from 10 July 1920 to 29 December 1921, including only the last year of the 13th Canadian Parliament. The government was formed by the National Liberal and Conservative Party. Meighen was also Prime Minister in the Thirteenth Canadian Ministry.

== Ministers ==
- Prime Minister
  - 10 July 1920 – 29 December 1921: Arthur Meighen
- Minister of Agriculture
  - 10 July 1920 – 29 December 1921: Simon Fraser Tolmie
- Minister of Customs and Excise
  - 4 June 1921 – 21 September 1921: Rupert Wilson Wigmore
  - 21 September 1921 – 29 December 1921: John Babington Macaulay Baxter
- Minister of Customs and Inland Revenue
  - 10 July 1920 – 13 July 1920: Martin Burrell
  - 13 July 1920 – 4 June 1921: Rupert Wilson Wigmore
- Secretary of State for External Affairs
  - 10 July 1920 – 29 December 1921: Arthur Meighen
- Minister of Finance
  - 10 July 1920 – 29 December 1921: Sir Henry Lumley Drayton
- Receiver General of Canada
  - 10 July 1920 – 29 December 1921: The Minister of Finance (Ex officio)
    - 10 July 1920 – 29 December 1921: Sir Henry Lumley Drayton
- Minister presiding over the Department of Health
  - 10 July 1920 – 21 September 1921: James Alexander Calder
  - 21 September 1921 – 29 December 1921: John Wesley Edwards
- Minister of Immigration and Colonization
  - 10 July 1920 – 21 September 1921: James Alexander Calder
  - 21 September 1921 – 29 December 1921: John Wesley Edwards
- Superintendent-General of Indian Affairs
  - 10 July 1920 – 29 December 1921: The Minister of the Interior (Ex officio)
    - 10 July 1920 – 29 December 1921: Sir James Alexander Lougheed
- Minister of the Interior
  - 10 July 1920 – 29 December 1921: Sir James Alexander Lougheed
- Minister of Justice
  - 10 July 1920 – 4 October 1921: Charles Doherty
  - 4 October 1921 – 29 December 1921: R. B. Bennett
- Attorney General of Canada
  - 10 July 1920 – 29 December 1921: The Minister of Justice (Ex officio)
    - 10 July 1920 – 21 September 1921: Charles Doherty
    - 4 October 1921 – 29 December 1921: R. B. Bennett
- Minister of Labour
  - 10 July 1920 – 29 December 1921: Gideon Robertson
- Leader of the Government in the Senate
  - 10 July 1920 – 29 December 1921: James Alexander Lougheed
- Minister of Marine and Fisheries
  - 10 July 1920 – 29 December 1921: Charles Ballantyne
- Minister of Militia and Defence
  - 10 July 1920 – 29 December 1921: Hugh Guthrie
- Minister of Mines
  - 10 July 1920 – 29 December 1921: Sir James Alexander Lougheed
- Minister of the Naval Service
  - 10 July 1920 – 29 December 1921: Charles Ballantyne
- Postmaster General
  - 10 July 1920 – 21 September 1921: Pierre-Édouard Blondin
  - 21 September 1921 – 29 December 1921: Louis de Gonzague Belley
- President of the Privy Council
  - 10 July 1920 – 21 September 1921: James Alexander Calder
  - 21 September 1921 – 29 December 1921: Louis-Philippe Normand
- Minister of Public Works
  - 10 July 1920 – 13 July 1920: John Dowsley Reid
  - 13 July 1920 – 29 December 1921: Fleming Blanchard McCurdy
- Minister of Railways and Canals
  - 10 July 1920 – 21 September 1921: John Dowsley Reid
  - 21 September 1921 – 29 December 1921: John Alexander Stewart
- Secretary of State of Canada
  - 10 July 1920 – 22 January 1921: Arthur Lewis Sifton
  - 22 January 1921 – 24 January 1921: Vacant (Thomas Mulvey was acting)
  - 24 January 1921 – 21 September 1921: Sir Henry Lumley Drayton (acting)
  - 21 September 1921 – 29 December 1921: Rodolphe Monty
- Registrar General of Canada
  - 10 July 1920 – 29 December 1921: The Secretary of State of Canada (Ex officio)
    - 10 July 1920 – 22 January 1921: Arthur Lewis Sifton
    - 22 January 1921 – 24 January 1921: Vacant (Thomas Mulvey was acting)
    - 24 January 1921 – 21 September 1921: Sir Henry Lumley Drayton (acting)
    - 21 September 1921 – 29 December 1921: Rodolphe Monty
- Minister of Soldiers' Civil Re-establishment
  - 10 July 1920 – 19 July 1920: Vacant (Norman Frederick Parkinson was acting)
  - 19 July 1920 – 22 September 1921: James Alexander Lougheed (acting)
  - 22 September 1921 – 29 December 1921: Robert James Manion
- Solicitor General of Canada
  - 10 July 1920 – 1 October 1921: Hugh Guthrie (acting)
- Minister of Trade and Commerce
  - 10 July 1920 – 21 September 1921: George Eulas Foster
  - 21 September 1921 – 29 December 1921: Henry Herbert Stevens
- Minister without Portfolio
  - 13 July 1920 – 29 December 1921: Sir Albert Edward Kemp
  - 13 July 1920 – 29 December 1921: Edgar Keith Spinney
  - 21 September 1921 – 29 December 1921: Edmund James Bristol
  - 26 September 1921 – 29 December 1921: James Robert Wilson

== Offices not of the cabinet ==
Parliamentary Secretary of Soldiers' Civil Re-establishment

- 10 July 1920 – 29 December 1921: Vacant

Solicitor General of Canada

- 1 October 1921 – 29 December 1921: Guillaume André Fauteux

== Succession ==
Ministries of Canada
Preceded by 10th Canadian Ministry	11th Canadian Ministry; 1920–1921	Succeeded by 12th Canadian Ministry
