= Minister of Pensions =

Minister of Pensions may refer to:

- Minister of Pensions (Britain)
- Minister of Pensions (France)
- Minister of Pensions and National Health (Canada)
