= 13th Canadian Ministry =

Government cabinet of Canada (1926)

13th Canadian Ministry 13e conseil des ministres du Canada
- 13th ministry of Canada

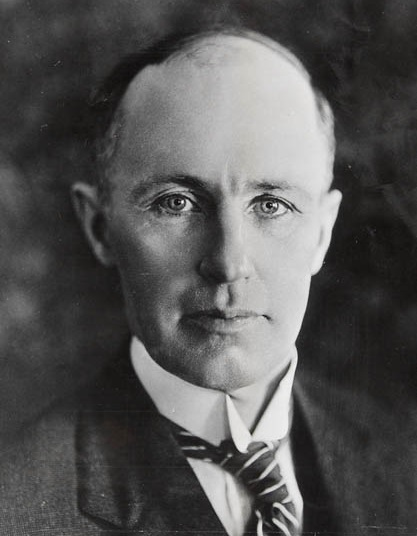
- Date formed: 29 June 1926
- Date dissolved: 25 September 1926

People and organizations
- Monarch: George V
- Governor General: Viscount Byng; Marquess of Willingdon
- Prime Minister: Arthur Meighen
- Member party: Conservative
- Status in legislature: Minority
- Opposition party: Liberal
- Opposition leader: William Lyon Mackenzie King

History
- Incoming formation: King–Byng affair
- Outgoing formation: 1926 Canadian federal election
- Legislature term: 15th Canadian Parliament
- Predecessor: 12th Canadian Ministry
- Successor: 14th Canadian Ministry

The Thirteenth Canadian Ministry was the second cabinet chaired by Prime Minister Arthur Meighen. It governed Canada from 29 June 1926 to 25 September 1926, including only the last three months of the 15th Canadian Parliament, all cabinet ministers were acting cabinet ministers as Meighen hadn't been given the confidence of the house, and any cabinet ministers appointed by him would have had to resign their seats and run for re-election. The government was formed by the old Conservative Party of Canada. Meighen was also Prime Minister in the Eleventh Canadian Ministry.

== Ministers ==
- Prime Minister
  - 29 June 1926 – 25 September 1926: Arthur Meighen
- Minister of Agriculture
  - 29 June 1926 – 13 July 1926: Henry Herbert Stevens (acting)
  - 13 July 1926 – 25 September 1926: Simon Fraser Tolmie
- Minister of Customs and Excise
  - 29 June 1926 – 13 July 1926: Henry Herbert Stevens (acting)
  - 13 July 1926 – 25 September 1926: Henry Herbert Stevens
- Secretary of State for External Affairs
  - 29 June 1926 – 25 September 1926: Arthur Meighen
- Minister of Finance
  - 29 June 1926 – 13 July 1926: Sir Henry Lumley Drayton (acting)
  - 13 July 1926 – 25 September 1926: R. B. Bennett
- Receiver General of Canada
  - 29 June 1926 – 25 September 1926: The Minister of Finance (Ex officio)
    - 29 June 1926 – 13 July 1926: Sir Henry Lumley Drayton (acting)
    - 13 July 1926 – 25 September 1926: R. B. Bennett
- Minister presiding over the Department of Health
  - 29 June 1926 – 13 July 1926: Robert James Manion (acting)
  - 13 July 1926 – 23 August 1926: Raymond Ducharme Morand (acting)
  - 23 August 1926 – 25 September 1926: Eugène Paquet
- Minister of Immigration and Colonization
  - 29 June 1926 – 13 July 1926: Robert James Manion (acting)
  - 13 July 1926 – 25 September 1926: Sir Henry Lumley Drayton
- Superintendent-General of Indian Affairs
  - 29 June 1926 – 25 September 1926: The Minister of the Interior (Ex officio)
    - 29 June 1926 – 13 July 1926: Henry Herbert Stevens (acting)
    - 13 July 1926 – 25 September 1926: R. B. Bennett (acting)
- Minister of the Interior
  - 29 June 1926 – 13 July 1926: Henry Herbert Stevens (acting)
  - 13 July 1926 – 25 September 1926: R. B. Bennett (acting)
- Minister of Justice
  - 29 June 1926 – 13 July 1926: Hugh Guthrie (acting)
  - 13 July 1926 – 25 September 1926: Esioff-Léon Patenaude
- Attorney General of Canada
  - 29 June 1926 – 25 September 1926: The Minister of Justice (Ex officio)
    - 29 June 1926 – 13 July 1926: Hugh Guthrie (acting)
    - 13 July 1926 – 25 September 1926: Esioff-Léon Patenaude
- Minister of Labour
  - 29 June 1926 – 13 July 1926: Robert James Manion (acting)
  - 13 July 1926 – 25 September 1926: George Burpee Jones
- Minister of Marine and Fisheries
  - 29 June 1926 – 13 July 1926: William Anderson Black (acting)
  - 13 July 1926 – 25 September 1926: Esioff-Léon Patenaude
- Minister of Mines
  - 29 June 1926 – 13 July 1926: Henry Herbert Stevens (acting)
  - 13 July 1926 – 25 September 1926: R. B. Bennett (acting)
- Minister of National Defence
  - 29 June 1926 – 13 July 1926: Hugh Guthrie (acting)
  - 13 July 1926 – 25 September 1926: Hugh Guthrie
- Postmaster General
  - 29 June 1926 – 13 July 1926: Robert James Manion (acting)
  - 13 July 1926 – 25 September 1926: Robert James Manion
- President of the Privy Council
  - 29 June 1926 – 25 September 1926: Arthur Meighen
- Minister of Public Works
  - 29 June 1926 – 13 July 1926: Sir George Halsey Perley (acting)
  - 13 July 1926 – 25 September 1926: Edmond Baird Ryckman
- Minister of Railways and Canals
  - 29 June 1926 – 13 July 1926: Sir Henry Lumley Drayton (acting)
  - 13 July 1926 – 25 September 1926: William Anderson Black
- Secretary of State of Canada
  - 29 June 1926 – 13 July 1926: George Halsey Perley (acting)
  - 13 July 1926 – 25 September 1926: Sir George Halsey Perley
- Registrar General of Canada
  - 29 June 1926 – 25 September 1926: The Secretary of State of Canada (Ex officio)
    - 29 June 1926 – 13 July 1926: Sir George Halsey Perley (acting)
    - 13 July 1926 – 25 September 1926: George Halsey Perley
- Minister of Soldiers' Civil Re-establishment
  - 29 June 1926 – 13 July 1926: Robert James Manion (acting)
  - 13 July 1926 – 23 August 1926: Raymond Ducharme Morand (acting)
  - 23 August 1926 – 25 September 1926: Eugène Paquet
- Solicitor General of Canada
  - 29 June 1926 – 23 August 1926: Vacant
  - 23 August 1926 – 25 September 1926: Guillaume-André Fauteux
- Minister of Trade and Commerce
  - 29 June 1926 – 13 July 1926: Henry Herbert Stevens (acting)
  - 13 July 1926 – 25 September 1926: James Dew Chaplin
- Minister without Portfolio
  - 7 July 1926 – 13 July 1926: R. B. Bennett
  - 13 July 1926 – 25 September 1926: Sir Henry Lumley Drayton
  - 13 July 1926 – 25 September 1926: Raymond Ducharme Morand
  - 13 July 1926 – 25 September 1926: John Alexander Macdonald
  - 13 July 1926 – 25 September 1926: Donald Sutherland

== Offices not of the Cabinet ==
Leader of the Government in the Senate

- 29 June 1926 – 25 September 1926: William Benjamin Ross

Parliamentary Secretary of Soldiers' Civil Re-establishment

- 29 June 1926 – 25 September 1926: Vacant

== Succession ==
Ministries of Canada
Preceded by 12th Canadian Ministry	13th Canadian Ministry; 1926	Succeeded by 14th Canadian Ministry
