= Minister of Foreign Affairs (Canada) =

Canadian federal cabinet position

- Ministre des Affaires étrangères
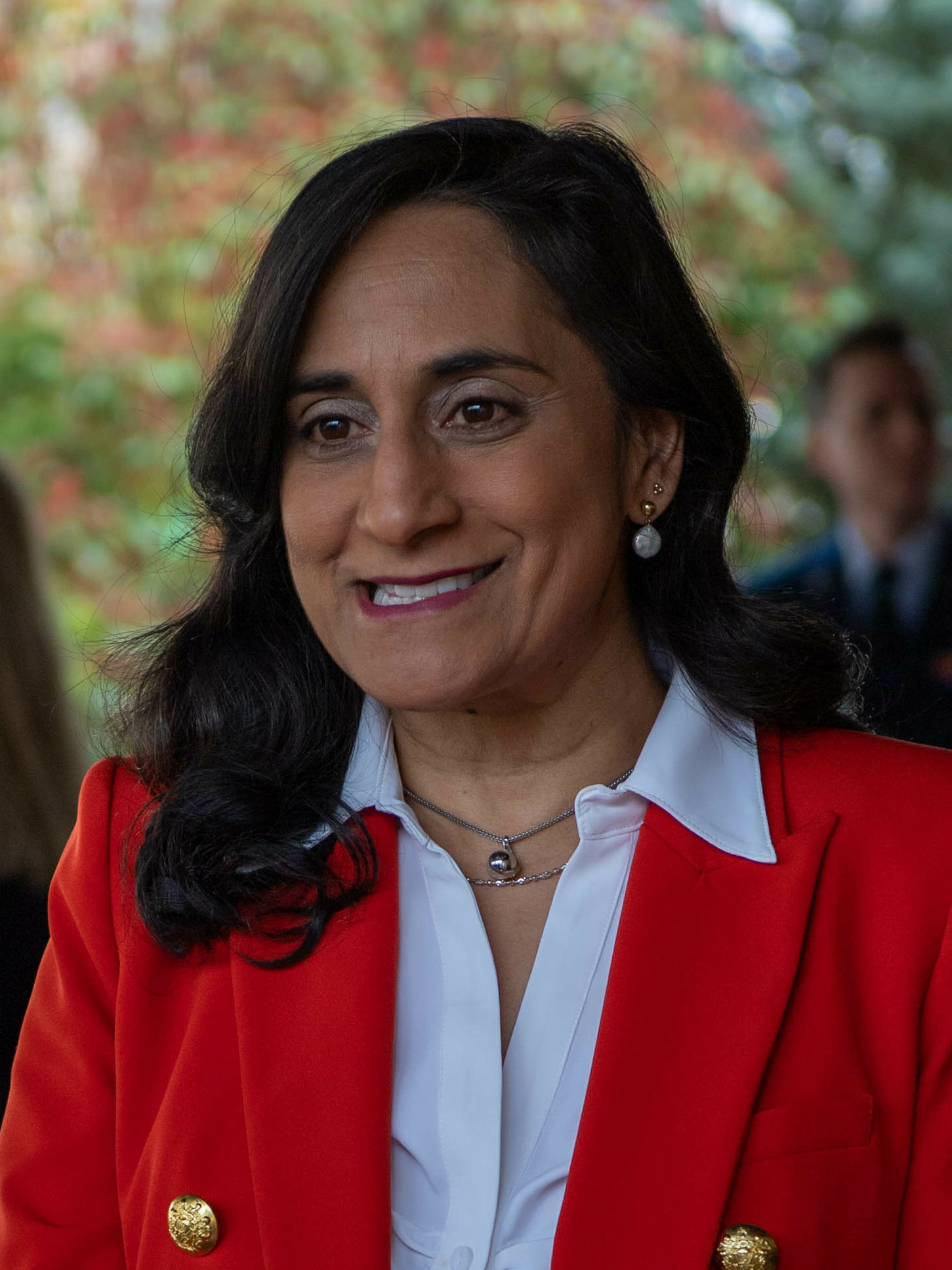
- Incumbent; Anita Anand since 13 May 2025
- Global Affairs Canada
- Style: The Honourable
- Member of: House of Commons; Privy Council; Cabinet
- Reports to: Parliament; Prime Minister
- Appointer: Monarch (represented by the governor general) on the advice of the prime minister
- Term length: At His Majesty's pleasure
- Inaugural holder: André Ouellet
- Formation: 4 November 1993
- Salary: CA$299,900 (2024)
- Website: www.international.gc.ca

The minister of foreign affairs (French: Ministre des Affaires étrangères) is the minister of the Crown in the Canadian Cabinet who is responsible for overseeing the Government of Canada's international relations and is the lead minister responsible for Global Affairs Canada, though the minister of international trade leads on trade issues. In addition to Global Affairs Canada, the minister is also the lead in overseeing the International Centre for Human Rights and Democratic Development and the International Development Research Centre.

From 1909 to 1993, the office was called the secretary of state for external affairs. The first two secretaries of state for external affairs, from 1909 until 1912, (Charles Murphy under Sir Wilfrid Laurier and William James Roche under Sir Robert Borden) concurrently served as the secretary of state of Canada. The two portfolios were permanently separated in 1912, and the external affairs portfolio was then held by the prime minister of Canada until 1946.

== History ==
Ministers holding the external affairs and foreign affairs portfolios have sometimes played prominent international roles:

- Lester B. Pearson (a future prime minister) defused the Suez Crisis and established the United Nations Peacekeeping Forces and as a result received the 1957 Nobel Peace Prize.
- Joe Clark (a former prime minister) led opposition to South Africa's Apartheid system within the Commonwealth of Nations, against initial resistance from the British government of Margaret Thatcher.
- Lloyd Axworthy brought about the Ottawa Treaty, banning anti-personnel landmines in most countries of the world.

As in Pearson's case (and that of Louis St. Laurent, his predecessor), the portfolio can be a final stepping stone to the prime minister's Office. Until 1946, it was customary for the office to be held by the sitting prime minister. John Diefenbaker would hold the portfolio on two subsequent occasions.

== Prior and subsequent diplomatic services ==
Lester Pearson is the only minister to have been a diplomat prior to their appointment. Pearson entered the Canadian foreign service in 1927 and rose to become Canadian ambassador to the United States from 1944 to 1946.

Paul Martin, Sr. served as Canadian High Commissioner to the United Kingdom after his retirement from active politics. Following his defeat in the 2011 election, Lawrence Cannon has served as Canadian ambassador to France since 2012, while Stéphane Dion was named Canadian ambassador to the European Union and Germany immediately after leaving cabinet in 2017. Unlike Pearson, none were career diplomats.

== List of ministers ==
Key:

Liberal Party of Canada
Historical conservative parties: Liberal-Conservative, Conservative (historical), Unionist, National Liberal and Conservative, Progressive Conservative
Conservative Party of Canada

No.	Portrait	Name	Term of office		Political party	Ministry
Secretary of State for External Affairs
1		Charles Murphy	May 19, 1909	October 6, 1911	Liberal	8 (Laurier)
2		William James Roche	October 10, 1911	April 1, 1912	Conservative (historical)	9 (Borden)
3		Robert Borden	April 1, 1912	October 11, 1917	Conservative (historical)	9 (Borden)
3		Robert Borden	October 12, 1917	July 9, 1920	Unionist	10 (Borden)
4		Arthur Meighen; 1st time	July 10, 1920	December 29, 1921	National Liberal and Conservative	11 (Meighen)
5		William Lyon Mackenzie King; 1st time	December 29, 1921	June 28, 1926	Liberal	12 (King)
(4)		Arthur Meighen; 2nd time	June 29, 1926	September 25, 1926	Conservative (historical)	13 (Meighen)
(5)		William Lyon Mackenzie King; 2nd time	September 25, 1926	August 7, 1930	Liberal	14 (King)
6		Richard Bedford Bennett	August 7, 1930	October 23, 1935	Conservative (historical)	15 (Bennett)
(5)		William Lyon Mackenzie King; 3rd time	October 23, 1935	September 3, 1946	Liberal	16 (King)
7		Louis St. Laurent	September 4, 1946	September 9, 1948	Liberal	16 (King)
8		Lester B. Pearson	September 10, 1948	November 15, 1948	Liberal	16 (King)
8		Lester B. Pearson	November 15, 1948	June 20, 1957	Liberal	17 (St. Laurent)
9		John Diefenbaker	June 21, 1957	September 12, 1957	Progressive Conservative	18 (Diefenbaker)
10		Sidney Earle Smith	September 13, 1957	March 17, 1959	Progressive Conservative	18 (Diefenbaker)
–		John Diefenbaker; 2nd time; acting minister	March 19, 1959	June 3, 1959	Progressive Conservative	18 (Diefenbaker)
11		Howard Charles Green	June 4, 1959	April 21, 1963	Progressive Conservative	18 (Diefenbaker)
12		Paul Martin Sr.	April 22, 1963	April 20, 1968	Liberal	19 (Pearson)
13		Mitchell Sharp	April 20, 1968	August 7, 1974	Liberal	20 (P. E. Trudeau)
14		Allan MacEachen; 1st time	August 8, 1974	September 13, 1976	Liberal	20 (P. E. Trudeau)
15		Don Jamieson	September 14, 1976	June 3, 1979	Liberal	20 (P. E. Trudeau)
16		Flora MacDonald	June 4, 1979	March 2, 1980	Progressive Conservative	21 (Clark)
17		Mark MacGuigan	March 3, 1980	September 9, 1982	Liberal	22 (P. E. Trudeau)
(14)		Allan MacEachen; 2nd time	September 10, 1982	June 29, 1984	Liberal	22 (P. E. Trudeau)
18		Jean Chrétien	June 30, 1984	September 16, 1984	Liberal	23 (Turner)
19		Joe Clark	September 17, 1984	April 20, 1991	Progressive Conservative	24 (Mulroney)
20		Barbara McDougall	April 21, 1991	June 24, 1993	Progressive Conservative	24 (Mulroney)
21		Perrin Beatty	June 25, 1993	November 3, 1993	Progressive Conservative	25 (Campbell)
22		André Ouellet	November 4, 1993	May 13, 1995	Liberal	26 (Chrétien)
Minister of Foreign Affairs
(22)		André Ouellet	May 13, 1995	January 24, 1996	Liberal	26 (Chrétien)
23		Lloyd Axworthy	January 25, 1996	October 16, 2000	Liberal	26 (Chrétien)
24		John Manley	October 17, 2000	January 15, 2002	Liberal	26 (Chrétien)
25		Bill Graham	January 15, 2002	December 11, 2003	Liberal	26 (Chrétien)
25		Bill Graham	December 12, 2003	July 19, 2004	Liberal	27 (Martin)
26		Pierre Pettigrew	July 20, 2004	February 5, 2006	Liberal	27 (Martin)
27		Peter MacKay	February 6, 2006	August 14, 2007	Conservative	28 (Harper)
28		Maxime Bernier	August 14, 2007	May 26, 2008	Conservative	28 (Harper)
29		David Emerson; Acting minister until June 25, 2008	May 25, 2008	October 29, 2008	Conservative	28 (Harper)
30		Lawrence Cannon	October 30, 2008	May 18, 2011	Conservative	28 (Harper)
31		John Baird	May 18, 2011	February 3, 2015	Conservative	28 (Harper)
–		Ed Fast (acting)	February 3, 2015	February 9, 2015	Conservative	28 (Harper)
32		Rob Nicholson	February 9, 2015	November 4, 2015	Conservative	28 (Harper)
33		Stéphane Dion	November 4, 2015	January 10, 2017	Liberal	29 (J. Trudeau)
34		Chrystia Freeland	January 10, 2017	November 20, 2019	Liberal	29 (J. Trudeau)
35		François-Philippe Champagne	November 20, 2019	January 12, 2021	Liberal	29 (J. Trudeau)
36		Marc Garneau	January 12, 2021	October 26, 2021	Liberal	29 (J. Trudeau)
37		Mélanie Joly	October 26, 2021	March 14, 2025	Liberal	29 (J. Trudeau)
Minister of Foreign Affairs and International Development
(37)		Mélanie Joly	March 14, 2025	May 13, 2025	Liberal	30 (Carney)
Minister of Foreign Affairs
38		Anita Anand	May 13, 2025	Incumbent	Liberal	30 (Carney)
