= Minister of Transport (Canada) =

Government department leader

- Ministre des Transports
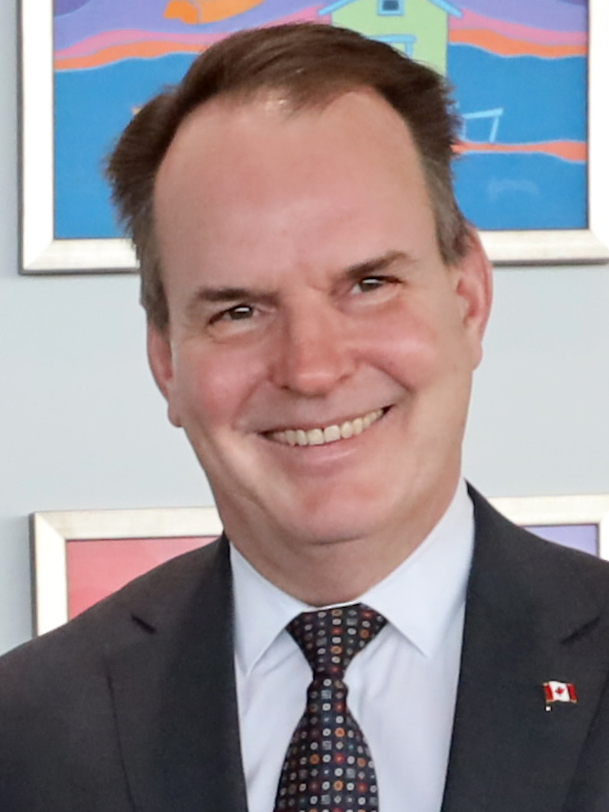
- Incumbent; Steven MacKinnon since 16 September 2025
- Transport Canada
- Style: The Honourable
- Member of: Cabinet; Privy Council
- Reports to: Parliament; Prime Minister
- Appointer: Monarch (represented by the governor general) on the advice of the prime minister
- Term length: At His Majesty's pleasure
- Precursor: Minister of Railways and Canals Minister of Marine
- Inaugural holder: C. D. Howe
- Formation: 2 November 1936
- Deputy: Deputy Minister of Transport
- Salary: $299,900 (2024)
- Website: www.tc.gc.ca

The minister of transport (French: ministre des transports) is a minister of the Crown in the Canadian Cabinet. The minister is responsible for overseeing the federal government's transportation regulatory and development department, Transport Canada, the Saint Lawrence Seaway, Nav Canada, and the Port Authority system. Since September 16, 2025, the position has been held by Steven MacKinnon of the Liberal Party.

== History ==
The Constitution Act, 1867 under section 92(10) established federal responsibility for land and sea transportation between provinces and internationally. Most transportation duties and powers were placed under the minister of public works, with responsibilities for ports and harbours going to the minister of marine and fisheries. In 1879, the Department of Public Works was divided in two, with powers and duties over rail and inland sea transport going to the newly formed minister of railways and canals. The minister of railways and canals was one of the most important cabinet posts because of the importance of railways to the economic development of Canada, with three prime ministers assuming the position either before or during their premiership.

In Prime Minister William Lyon Mackenzie King's third cabinet in 1935, C. D. Howe was appointed to both the minister of railways and canals and the minister of marine, which was a short-lived position split from the minister of marine and fisheries in 1930. The office of Minister of Transport was created by Mackenzie King in 1936, which was formally a successor to the minister of railways and canals, and C. D. Howe was appointed as the first Minister of Transport.

From 2006 to 2013, the position was styled Minister of Transport, Infrastructure and Communities, a name change corresponding with responsibility for Infrastructure Canada being transferred to the portfolio at that time. "Minister of Transport" remained the title for legal purposes. With the Cabinet shuffle of July 15, 2013, Infrastructure and Communities portfolio was separated from Transport and assigned to the minister of intergovernmental affairs.

Transport Canada used to manage most of Canada's major airports, but in the 1990s, most airports were off-loaded to non-profit private airport authorities. The department is now responsible for transportation safety, appointments to Boards of Governors, and regulation management.

== Portfolio ==
In addition to Transport Canada, the minister of transport is responsible for overseeing 55 other entities, the majority of which are port authorities and airport authorities:

- Transport Canada
- Shared governance organizations:
  - 18 port authorities
  - 21 airport authorities
  - Buffalo and Fort Erie Public Bridge Authority
  - Nav Canada
  - St. Lawrence Seaway Management Corporation
- Crown corporations:
  - Atlantic Pilotage Authority
  - Canadian Air Transport Security Authority
  - Federal Bridge Corporation
  - Great Lakes Pilotage Authority
  - Laurentian Pilotage Authority
  - Marine Atlantic
  - Pacific Pilotage Authority
  - Via Rail
    - Alto
- Other entities:
  - Canadian Transportation Agency
  - Ship-source Oil Pollution Fund
  - The Fund for Railway Accidents Involving Designated Goods
  - Transportation Appeal Tribunal of Canada

== Minister of Railways and Canals (1879–1936) ==
Key:

Liberal Party of Canada
Historical conservative parties: Liberal-Conservative, Conservative (historical), Unionist, National Liberal and Conservative

Portrait	Name	Term of office		Political party	Ministry
	Sir Charles Tupper	20 May 1879	28 May 1884	Liberal-Conservative	3 (Macdonald)
	John Henry Pope (acting)	29 May 1884	24 September 1885	Liberal-Conservative	3 (Macdonald)
	John Henry Pope	25 September 1885	1 April 1889	Liberal-Conservative	3 (Macdonald)
	vacant	2 April 1889	9 April 1889	–	3 (Macdonald)
	John A. Macdonald (acting)	10 April 1889	27 November 1889	Liberal-Conservative	3 (Macdonald)
	John A. Macdonald	28 November 1889	6 June 1891	Liberal-Conservative	3 (Macdonald)
	vacant	7 June 1891	16 June 1891	–	4 (Abbott)
	Mackenzie Bowell (acting)	17 June 1891	10 January 1892	Conservative (historical)	4 (Abbott)
	John Graham Haggart	11 January 1892	4 December 1892	Conservative (historical)	4 (Abbott)
	John Graham Haggart	5 December 1892	20 December 1894	Conservative (historical)	5 (Thompson)
	John Graham Haggart	21 December 1894	5 January 1896	Conservative (historical)	6 (Bowell)
	Joseph-Aldric Ouimet (acting)	6 January 1896	14 January 1896	Conservative (historical)	6 (Bowell)
	John Graham Haggart	15 January 1896	30 April 1896	Conservative (historical)	6 (Bowell)
	John Graham Haggart	1 May 1896	8 July 1896	Conservative (historical)	7 (Tupper)
	vacant	6 January 1896	14 January 1896	–	8 (Laurier)
	Andrew George Blair	20 July 1896	20 July 1903	Liberal	8 (Laurier)
	William Stevens Fielding (acting)	21 July 1903	14 January 1904	Liberal	8 (Laurier)
	Henry Emmerson	15 January 1904	2 April 1907	Liberal	8 (Laurier)
	vacant	3 April 1907	8 April 1907	–	8 (Laurier)
	William Stevens Fielding (acting)	9 April 1907	29 August 1907	Liberal	8 (Laurier)
	George Perry Graham	30 August 1907	10 October 1911	Liberal	8 (Laurier)
	Francis Cochrane	10 October 1911	12 October 1917	Conservative (historical)	9 (Borden)
	John Dowsley Reid	12 October 1917	9 July 1920	Unionist	10 (Borden)
	John Dowsley Reid	10 July 1920	20 September 1921	Unionist	11 (Meighen)
	John Alexander Stewart	21 September 1921	29 December 1921	Unionist	11 (Meighen)
	William Costello Kennedy	29 December 1921	18 January 1923	Liberal	12 (King)
	vacant	19 January 1923	27 April 1923	–	12 (King)
	George Perry Graham	28 April 1923	19 February 1926	Liberal	12 (King)
	vacant	20 February 1926	28 February 1926	–	12 (King)
	Charles Avery Dunning	1 March 1926	28 June 1926	Liberal	12 (King)
	Henry Lumley Drayton (acting)	29 June 1926	12 July 1926	Conservative (historical)	13 (Meighen)
	William Anderson Black (acting)	13 July 1926	25 September 1926	Conservative (historical)	13 (Meighen)
	Charles Avery Dunning	25 September 1926	25 November 1929	Liberal	14 (King)
	Charles Avery Dunning (acting)	26 November 1929	29 December 1929	Liberal	14 (King)
	Thomas Crerar	30 December 1929	7 August 1930	Liberal	14 (King)
	Robert James Manion	7 August 1930	23 October 1935	Conservative (historical)	15 (Bennett)
	C. D. Howe	23 October 1935	1 November 1936	Liberal	16 (King)
Railways and Canals portfolio moved to Minister of Transport.

== Minister of Marine (1930–1936) ==
Key:

Liberal
Conservative (historical)

Portrait	Name	Term of office		Political party	Ministry
	Arthur Cardin	14 June 1930	7 August 1930	Liberal	14 (King)
	Alfred Duranleau	7 August 1930	19 July 1935	Conservative (historical)	15 (Bennett)
	vacant	20 July 1935	29 August 1935	—	15 (Bennett)
	Lucien Henri Gendron	30 August 1935	23 October 1935	Conservative (historical)	15 (Bennett)
	C. D. Howe	23 October 1935	1 November 1936	Liberal	16 (King)
Marine portfolio moved to Minister of Transport.

== Minister of Transport (1936–present) ==
Key:

Liberal
Progressive Conservative
Conservative

Portrait	Name	Term of office		Political party	Ministry
Minister of Transport
	C. D. Howe	2 November 1936	7 July 1940	Liberal	16 (King)
	Arthur Cardin	8 July 1940	12 May 1942	Liberal	16 (King)
	C. D. Howe (acting)	13 May 1942	5 October 1942	Liberal	16 (King)
	Joseph-Enoil Michaud	6 October 1942	17 April 1945	Liberal	16 (King)
	Lionel Chevrier	18 April 1945	14 November 1948	Liberal	16 (King)
	Lionel Chevrier	15 November 1948	30 June 1954	Liberal	17 (St. Laurent)
	George Carlyle Marler	1 July 1954	20 June 1957	Liberal	17 (St. Laurent)
	George Hees	21 June 1957	10 October 1960	Progressive Conservative	18 (Diefenbaker)
	Léon Balcer	11 October 1960	21 April 1963	Progressive Conservative	18 (Diefenbaker)
	George McIlraith	22 April 1963	2 February 1964	Liberal	19 (Pearson)
	Jack Pickersgill	3 February 1964	18 September 1967	Liberal	19 (Pearson)
	Paul Hellyer	19 September 1967	19 April 1968	Liberal	19 (Pearson)
	Paul Hellyer	20 April 1968	29 April 1969	Liberal	20 (P. E. Trudeau)
	James Armstrong Richardson (acting)	30 April 1969	4 May 1969	Liberal	20 (P. E. Trudeau)
	Don Jamieson	5 May 1969	26 November 1972	Liberal	20 (P. E. Trudeau)
	Jean Marchand	27 November 1972	25 September 1975	Liberal	20 (P. E. Trudeau)
	Otto Lang	26 September 1975	3 June 1979	Liberal	20 (P. E. Trudeau)
	Don Mazankowski	4 June 1979	2 March 1980	Progressive Conservative	21 (Clark)
	Jean-Luc Pépin	3 March 1980	11 August 1983	Liberal	22 (P. E. Trudeau)
	Lloyd Axworthy	12 August 1983	29 June 1984	Liberal	22 (P. E. Trudeau)
	Lloyd Axworthy	30 June 1984	16 September 1984	Liberal	23 (Turner)
	Don Mazankowski (2nd time)	17 September 1984	29 June 1986	Progressive Conservative	24 (Mulroney)
	John Crosbie	30 June 1986	30 March 1988	Progressive Conservative	24 (Mulroney)
	Benoît Bouchard	31 March 1988	22 February 1990	Progressive Conservative	24 (Mulroney)
	Doug Lewis	23 February 1990	20 April 1991	Progressive Conservative	24 (Mulroney)
	Jean Corbeil	21 April 1991	24 June 1993	Progressive Conservative	24 (Mulroney)
	Jean Corbeil	25 June 1993	3 November 1993	Progressive Conservative	25 (Campbell)
	Doug Young	4 November 1993	24 January 1996	Liberal	26 (Chrétien)
	David Anderson	25 January 1996	10 June 1997	Liberal	26 (Chrétien)
	David Collenette	11 June 1997	11 December 2003	Liberal	26 (Chrétien)
	Tony Valeri	12 December 2003	19 July 2004	Liberal	27 (Martin)
	Jean Lapierre	20 July 2004	5 February 2006	Liberal	27 (Martin)
Minister of Transport, Infrastructure, and Communities
	Lawrence Cannon	6 February 2006	30 October 2008	Conservative	28 (Harper)
	John Baird	30 October 2008	6 August 2010	Conservative	28 (Harper)
	Chuck Strahl	6 August 2010	18 May 2011	Conservative	28 (Harper)
	Denis Lebel	18 May 2011	15 July 2013	Conservative	28 (Harper)
Minister of Transport
	Lisa Raitt	15 July 2013	4 November 2015	Conservative	28 (Harper)
	Marc Garneau	4 November 2015	12 January 2021	Liberal	29 (J. Trudeau)
	Omar Alghabra	12 January 2021	26 July 2023	Liberal	29 (J. Trudeau)
	Pablo Rodriguez	26 July 2023	19 September 2024	Liberal	29 (J. Trudeau)
	Anita Anand	19 September 2024	20 December 2024	Liberal	29 (J. Trudeau)
Minister of Transport and Internal Trade
	Anita Anand	20 December 2024	14 March 2025	Liberal	29 (J. Trudeau)
	Chrystia Freeland	14 March 2025	16 September 2025	Liberal	30 (Carney)
Minister of Transport and Leader of the Government in the House of Commons
	Steven MacKinnon	16 September 2025	Incumbent	Liberal	30 (Carney)

== See also ==
- Infrastructure and Communities
