= Pacific Pilotage Authority =

- Company type: Crown corporation
- Industry: Maritime transport
- Headquarters: Vancouver, British Columbia, Canada
- Area served: Coastal waters of British Columbia, including the Fraser River
- Key people: Julie Gascon, CEO
- Services: Pilotage
- Revenue: ▼CA$83,241 million (2020)
- Net income: ▲CA$2.100 million (2018)
- Total assets: ▲CA$14,817 million (2020)

Agency overview
- Minister responsible: Steven MacKinnon, Minister of Transport
- Parent department: Transport Canada
- Key document: Pilotage Act
- Website: www.ppa.gc.ca

The Pacific Pilotage Authority (French: Administration de pilotage du Pacifique) is a Crown corporation of the Government of Canada that is responsible for pilotage through coastal waters in British Columbia, including the Fraser River.

It was established by the Pilotage Act in 1972 as a result of recommendations made by the Royal Commission on Pilotage in Canada.

In 2023, Julie Gascon was named as the new chief executive officer (CEO) of the organization.
