= Minister of Finance (Canada) =

Minister in the Cabinet of Canada

- Ministre des Finances
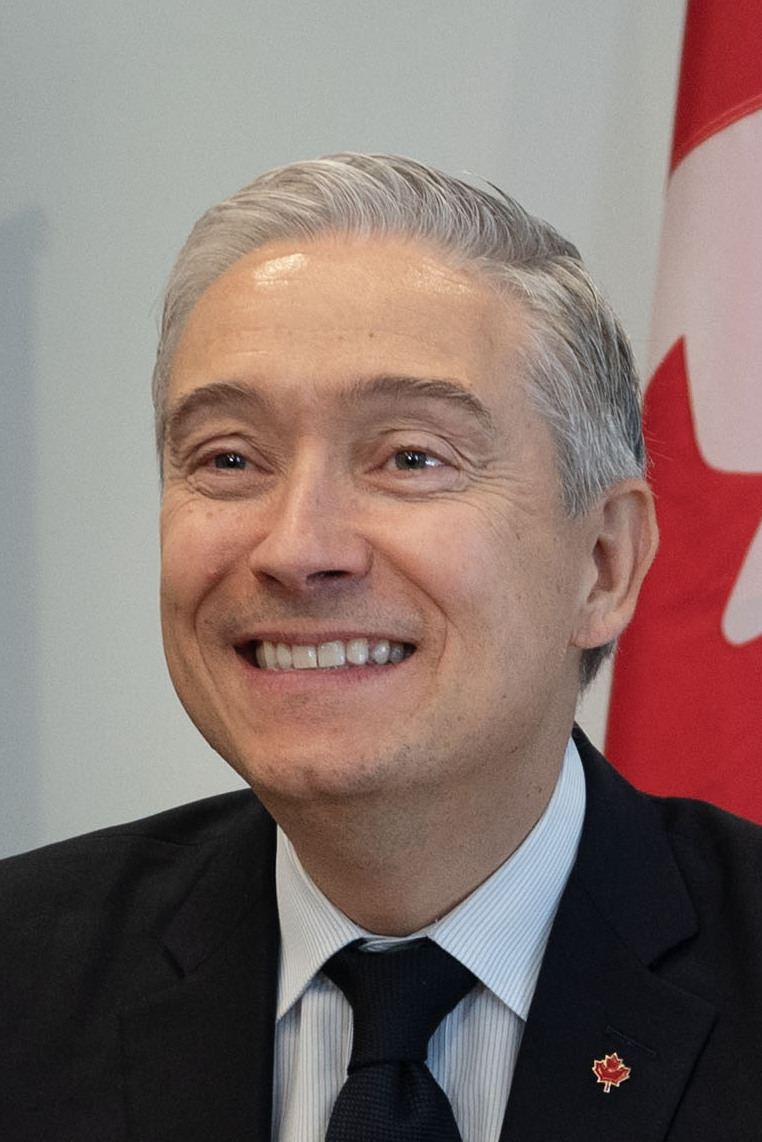
- Incumbent; François-Philippe Champagne since March 14, 2025
- Department of Finance
- Style: The Honourable
- Member of: Parliament; Privy Council; Cabinet; Treasury Board
- Reports to: Parliament; Prime Minister
- Appointer: Monarch (represented by the governor general) on the advice of the prime minister
- Term length: At His Majesty's pleasure
- Inaugural holder: Alexander Galt
- Formation: July 1, 1867
- Salary: CA$299,900 (2024)
- Website: fin.canada.ca

The minister of finance (French: ministre des Finances) is the minister of the Crown in the Canadian Cabinet, who is responsible for overseeing the Department of Finance and presenting the federal government's budget each year. It is one of the most important positions in the Cabinet.

François-Philippe Champagne is the 42nd and current finance minister, assuming the role March 14, 2025 as a member of the new 30th Canadian Ministry of Mark Carney.

== Responsibilities ==
In addition to being the head of the Department of Finance, the minister of finance is also the minister responsible for:

- Bank of Canada
- Canada Deposit Insurance Corporation
- Canada Development Investment Corporation
- Canada Pension Plan Investment Board
- Canadian International Trade Tribunal
- Office of the Superintendent of Financial Institutions
- Financial Transactions and Reports Analysis Centre of Canada
- Mission to the International Monetary Fund (serving as "Governor" voter)
- Serving as a permanent member of the Treasury Board of Canada

== List of ministers ==
Key:

Liberal Party of Canada
Historical conservative parties: Liberal-Conservative, Conservative (historical), Unionist, National Liberal and Conservative, Progressive Conservative
Conservative Party of Canada

No.	Portrait	Name	Term of office		Political party	Ministry
1		Alexander Galt	July 1, 1867	November 7, 1867	Liberal-Conservative	1 (Macdonald)
2		Sir John Rose	November 18, 1867	September 29, 1869	Liberal-Conservative	1 (Macdonald)
3		Sir Francis Hincks	October 9, 1869	February 21, 1873	Liberal-Conservative	1 (Macdonald)
4		Samuel Leonard Tilley (1st time)	February 22, 1873	November 5, 1873	Liberal-Conservative	1 (Macdonald)
5		Richard John Cartwright	November 7, 1873	October 16, 1878	Liberal	2 (Mackenzie)
(4)		Sir Samuel Leonard Tilley (2nd time)	October 17, 1878	November 11, 1885	Liberal-Conservative	3 (Macdonald)
–		Vacant	November 11, 1885	December 10, 1885	—	3 (Macdonald)
6		Archibald McLelan	December 10, 1885	January 27, 1887	Conservative (historical)	3 (Macdonald)
7		Sir Charles Tupper	January 27, 1887	May 22, 1888	Conservative (historical)	3 (Macdonald)
8		George Foster (1st time)	May 29, 1888	June 6, 1891	Conservative (historical)	3 (Macdonald)
8		George Foster (1st time)	June 16, 1891	November 24, 1892	Conservative (historical)	4 (Abbott)
8		George Foster (1st time)	December 5, 1892	December 12, 1894	Conservative (historical)	5 (Thompson)
8		George Foster (1st time)	December 21, 1894	January 6, 1896	Conservative (historical)	6 (Bowell)
–		Mackenzie Bowell (Acting)	January 6, 1896	January 15, 1896	Conservative (historical)	6 (Bowell)
(8)		George Foster (2nd time)	January 15, 1896	April 27, 1896	Conservative (historical)	6 (Bowell)
(8)		George Foster (2nd time)	May 1, 1896	July 8, 1896	Conservative (historical)	7 (Tupper)
–		Vacant	July 8, 1896	July 20, 1896	—	8 (Laurier)
9		William Stevens Fielding (1st time)	July 20, 1896	October 6, 1911	Liberal	8 (Laurier)
10		Sir Thomas White	October 10, 1911	August 2, 1919	Conservative (historical)	9•10 (Borden)
11		Sir Henry Drayton (1st time)	August 2, 1919	July 10, 1920	Conservative (historical)	9•10 (Borden)
11		Sir Henry Drayton (1st time)	July 10, 1920	December 29, 1921	Conservative (historical)	11 (Meighen)
(9)		William Stevens Fielding (2nd time)	December 29, 1921	September 5, 1925	Liberal	12 (King)
12		James Robb (1st time)	September 5, 1925	June 29, 1926	Liberal	12 (King)
–		Sir Henry Drayton (2nd time; Acting)	June 29, 1926	July 13, 1926	Conservative (historical)	13 (Meighen)
13		Richard Bedford Bennett (1st time)	July 13, 1926	September 25, 1926	Conservative (historical)	13 (Meighen)
(12)		James Robb (2nd time)	September 25, 1926	November 11, 1929	Liberal	14 (King)
14		Charles Avery Dunning	November 26, 1929	August 7, 1930	Liberal	14 (King)
(13)		Richard Bedford Bennett (2nd time)	August 7, 1930	February 2, 1932	Conservative (historical)	15 (Bennett)
15		Edgar Nelson Rhodes	February 3, 1932	October 24, 1935	Conservative (historical)	15 (Bennett)
(14)		Charles Avery Dunning (2nd time)	October 24, 1935	September 6, 1939	Liberal	16 (King)
16		James Ralston	September 6, 1939	July 4, 1940	Liberal	16 (King)
17		James Lorimer Ilsley	July 8, 1940	December 10, 1946	Liberal	16 (King)
18		Douglas Abbott	December 10, 1946	November 15, 1948	Liberal	16 (King)
18		Douglas Abbott	November 15, 1948	June 30, 1954	Liberal	17 (St. Laurent)
19		Walter Harris	July 1, 1954	June 21, 1957	Liberal	17 (St. Laurent)
20		Donald Fleming	June 21, 1957	August 9, 1962	Progressive Conservative	18 (Diefenbaker)
21		George Nowlan	August 9, 1962	April 22, 1963	Progressive Conservative	18 (Diefenbaker)
22		Walter L. Gordon	April 22, 1963	November 11, 1965	Liberal	19 (Pearson)
23		Mitchell Sharp	November 11, 1965 (Acting until Dec.18)	April 20, 1968	Liberal	19 (Pearson)
24		Edgar Benson	April 20, 1968	January 28, 1972	Liberal	20 (P. E. Trudeau)
25		John Turner	January 28, 1972	September 10, 1975	Liberal	20 (P. E. Trudeau)
–		Charles Drury (Acting)	September 10, 1975	September 26, 1975	Liberal	20 (P. E. Trudeau)
26		Donald Stovel Macdonald	September 26, 1975	September 16, 1977	Liberal	20 (P. E. Trudeau)
27		Jean Chrétien	September 16, 1977	June 4, 1979	Liberal	20 (P. E. Trudeau)
28		John Crosbie	June 4, 1979	March 3, 1980	Progressive Conservative	21 (Clark)
29		Allan MacEachen	March 3, 1980	September 10, 1982	Liberal	22 (P. E. Trudeau)
30		Marc Lalonde	September 10, 1982	June 30, 1984	Liberal	22 (P. E. Trudeau)
30		Marc Lalonde	June 30, 1984	September 17, 1984	Liberal	23 (Turner)
31		Michael Wilson	September 17, 1984	April 21, 1991	Progressive Conservative	24 (Mulroney)
32		Don Mazankowski	April 21, 1991	June 25, 1993	Progressive Conservative	24 (Mulroney)
33		Gilles Loiselle	June 25, 1993	November 4, 1993	Progressive Conservative	25 (Campbell)
34		Paul Martin	November 4, 1993	June 2, 2002	Liberal	26 (Chrétien)
35		John Manley	June 2, 2002	December 12, 2003	Liberal	26 (Chrétien)
36		Ralph Goodale	December 12, 2003	February 6, 2006	Liberal	27 (Martin)
37		Jim Flaherty	February 6, 2006	March 18, 2014	Conservative	28 (Harper)
38		Joe Oliver	March 19, 2014	November 4, 2015	Conservative	28 (Harper)
39		Bill Morneau	November 4, 2015	August 17, 2020	Liberal	29 (J. Trudeau)
40		Chrystia Freeland	August 18, 2020	December 16, 2024	Liberal	29 (J. Trudeau)
41		Dominic LeBlanc	December 16, 2024	March 14, 2025	Liberal	29 (J. Trudeau)
42		François-Philippe Champagne	March 14, 2025	Incumbent	Liberal	30 (Carney)

== Associate Minister of Finance ==
Associate Minister of Finance
- Ministre associé des Finances
- Incumbent; Vacant since July 26, 2023
- Department of Finance
- Style: The Honourable
- Member of: Parliament; Privy Council; Cabinet
- Reports to: Parliament; Prime Minister
- Appointer: Monarch (represented by the governor general) on the advice of the prime minister
- Term length: At His Majesty's pleasure
- Inaugural holder: Mona Fortier
- Salary: CA$269,800 (2019)
- Website: fin.canada.ca

The associate minister of finance (French: ministre associé des finances) was a member of the Canadian Cabinet who is responsible for various files within the Department of Finance Canada as assigned by the minister of finance.

This portfolio was introduced in the 29th Canadian ministry under Prime Minister Justin Trudeau.

Minister	Tenure		Prime Minister
Mona Fortier	20 November 2019	26 October 2021	29 (J. Trudeau)
Randy Boissonnault	26 October 2021	26 July 2023	29 (J. Trudeau)

== See also ==
- Canadian federal budget
