= Lucien Henri Gendron =

Canadian politician

The Honourable Lucien Henri Gendron PC

Minister of Marine
- In office August 30, 1935 – October 22, 1935
- Preceded by: Alfred Duranleau
- Succeeded by: C. D. Howe

Personal details
- Born: August 28, 1890
- Died: April 5, 1959 (aged 68)
- Party: Conservative

Lucien Henri Gendron, PC (August 28, 1890 – April 5, 1959) was a Canadian politician.

== Bio ==
In August 1935, he was appointed Minister of Marine in the Conservative cabinet of Richard Bedford Bennett. He was defeated in the 1935 federal election in the Quebec riding of Laval—Two Mountains.
