= Minister of Fisheries (Canada) =

Canadian cabinet minister

- Ministre des Pêches
- Incumbent; Joanne Thompson since March 14, 2025
- Fisheries and Oceans Canada
- Style: The Honourable
- Member of: House of Commons; Privy Council; Cabinet
- Reports to: Parliament; Prime Minister
- Appointer: Monarch (represented by the governor general); on the advice of the prime minister
- Term length: At His Majesty's pleasure
- Precursor: Minister of Fisheries and the Environment
- Inaugural holder: Roméo LeBlanc
- Formation: April 2, 1979
- Salary: CA$299,900 (2024)
- Website: Official website

The minister of fisheries (French: ministre des pêches) is the minister of the Crown responsible for the Department of Fisheries and Oceans (DFO). The minister is a member of the King's Privy Council for Canada and the Canadian Cabinet.

Joanne Thompson has been the minister of fisheries since March 14, 2025. The minister is selected by the prime minister and appointed by the Crown. The title was first used in 1930, however, the role as it exists today was established in 1979 as the minister of fisheries and oceans. From 2015 to 2025, the officeholder was known as the minister of fisheries, oceans and the Canadian Coast Guard, before it was changed to the current title in 2025.

== History ==
There was a minister of marine and fisheries from Confederation in 1867 onwards. The role was split in two in 1930, with duties related to fisheries going to the new minister of fisheries, and all other responsibilities going to the new minister of marine, which was merged into the role of minister of transport a few years later.

The minister of fisheries lasted from 1930 to 1969, at which point the post was merged with forestry to create the post of minister of fisheries and forestry. This lasted only two years, until 1971, when the minister of fisheries became a secondary role held concurrently by the minister of the environment. In 1974, the fisheries portfolio was assigned to Roméo LeBlanc as the minister of state (fisheries) assisting the minister of the environment. When LeBlanc was appointed as the minister of the environment in 1976, the post was restyled minister of fisheries and environment.

The current post of minister of fisheries and oceans was established in 1979, and it has continued under various names since then. Hunter Tootoo was the first Indigenous person to hold this portfolio, from November 4, 2015, until May 31, 2016.

From 1995 to 2025, the minister was responsible for the Canadian Coast Guard (CCG), which was a special operating agency of Fisheries and Oceans Canada. Until 1995, the CCG was housed under Transport Canada. In 2025, the government transitioned the CCG to the Department of National Defence.

== Ministers of Marine and Fisheries (1867–1930) ==
Key:

Liberal Party of Canada
Historical conservative parties: Liberal-Conservative, Conservative (historical), Unionist, National Liberal and Conservative

| No. | Portrait | Name | Term of office | | Political party | Ministry |
|---|---|---|---|---|---|---|
| 1 | | Peter Mitchell | July 1, 1867 | November 5, 1873 | Liberal-Conservative | 1 (Macdonald) |
| 2 | | Sir Albert James Smith | November 7, 1873 | October 8, 1878 | Liberal | 2 (Mackenzie) |
| 3 | | James Colledge Pope | October 19, 1878 | July 9, 1882 | Conservative (historical) | 3 (Macdonald) |
| 4 | | Archibald McLelan | July 10, 1882 | December 9, 1885 | Conservative (historical) | 3 (Macdonald) |
| 5 | | George Foster | December 10, 1885 | May 28, 1888 | Conservative (historical) | 3 (Macdonald) |
| 6 | | Sir Charles Hibbert Tupper | June 1, 1888 | June 6, 1891 | Conservative (historical) | 3 (Macdonald) |
| 6 | | Sir Charles Hibbert Tupper | June 16, 1891 | November 24, 1892 | Conservative (historical) | 4 (Abbott) |
| 6 | | Sir Charles Hibbert Tupper | December 5, 1892 | December 12, 1894 | Conservative (historical) | 5 (Thompson) |
| 7 | | John Costigan | December 21, 1894 | April 27, 1896 | Liberal-Conservative | 6 (Bowell) |
| 7 | | John Costigan | May 1, 1896 | July 8, 1896 | Liberal-Conservative | 7 (Tupper) |
| 8 | | Sir Louis Henry Davies | July 13, 1896 | September 24, 1901 | Liberal | 8 (Laurier) |
| 9 | | James Sutherland | January 15, 1902 | November 10, 1902 | Liberal | 8 (Laurier) |
| 10 | | Raymond Préfontaine | November 11, 1902 | January 5, 1905 | Liberal | 8 (Laurier) |
| – | | Sir Wilfrid Laurier (acting) | January 6, 1906 | February 5, 1906 | Liberal | 8 (Laurier) |
| 11 | | Louis-Philippe Brodeur | February 6, 1906 | August 10, 1911 | Liberal | 8 (Laurier) |
| 12 | | Rodolphe Lemieux | August 11, 1911 | October 6, 1911 | Liberal | 8 (Laurier) |
| 13 | | John Douglas Hazen | October 10, 1911 | October 12, 1917 | Conservative (historical) | 9 (Borden) |
| 14 | | Charles Ballantyne | October 13, 1917 | July 10, 1920 | Unionist | 10 (Borden) |
| 14 | | Charles Ballantyne | July 10, 1920 | December 29, 1921 | Unionist | 11 (Meighen) |
| 15 | | Ernest Lapointe | December 29, 1921 | January 29, 1924 | Liberal | 12 (King) |
| 16 | | Arthur Cardin (1st time) | January 30, 1924 | June 28, 1926 | Liberal | 12 (King) |
| – | | William Anderson Black (acting) | June 29, 1926 | July 12, 1926 | Conservative (historical) | 13 (Meighen) |
| 17 | | Esioff-Léon Patenaude | July 13, 1926 | September 25, 1926 | Conservative (historical) | 13 (Meighen) |
| (16) | | Arthur Cardin (2nd time) | September 25, 1926 | June 13, 1930 | Liberal | 14 (King) |
Marine portfolio moved to Minister of Marine, Fisheries portfolio moved to Minister of Fisheries.

== Ministers of Fisheries (1930–1969) ==
Key:

Liberal Party of Canada
Historical conservative parties: Conservative (historical), Progressive Conservative

| No. | Portrait | Name | Term of office | | Political party | Ministry |
|---|---|---|---|---|---|---|
| 1 | | Cyrus Macmillan | June 17, 1930 | August 7, 1930 | Liberal | 14 (King) |
| 2 | | Edgar Nelson Rhodes | August 7, 1930 | February 2, 1932 | Conservative (historical) | 15 (Bennett) |
| – | | Alfred Duranleau (acting) | February 2, 1932 | November 16, 1934 | Conservative (historical) | 15 (Bennett) |
| – | | Grote Stirling (acting) | November 17, 1934 | August 13, 1935 | Conservative (historical) | 15 (Bennett) |
| 3 | | William Gordon Ernst | August 14, 1935 | October 23, 1935 | Conservative (historical) | 15 (Bennett) |
| 4 | | Joseph-Enoil Michaud | October 23, 1935 | October 5, 1942 | Liberal | 16 (King) |
| 5 | | Ernest Bertrand | October 7, 1942 | August 28, 1945 | Liberal | 16 (King) |
| 6 | | Hedley Francis Gregory Bridges | August 30, 1945 | August 10, 1947 | Liberal | 16 (King) |
| – | | Ernest Bertrand (acting) | August 14, 1947 | September 1, 1947 | Liberal | 16 (King) |
| 7 | | Milton Fowler Gregg | September 2, 1947 | January 18, 1948 | Liberal | 16 (King) |
| 8 | | James Angus MacKinnon | January 19, 1948 | June 10, 1948 | Liberal | 16 (King) |
| 9 | | Robert Mayhew | June 11, 1948 | November 15, 1948 | Liberal | 16 (King) |
| 9 | | Robert Mayhew | November 15, 1948 | October 14, 1952 | Liberal | 17 (St. Laurent) |
| 10 | | James Sinclair | October 15, 1952 | June 21, 1957 | Liberal | 17 (St. Laurent) |
| 11 | | Angus MacLean | June 21, 1957 | April 22, 1963 | Progressive Conservative | 18 (Diefenbaker) |
| 12 | | Hédard Robichaud | April 22, 1963 | April 20, 1968 | Liberal | 19 (Pearson) |
| 12 | | Hédard Robichaud | April 20, 1968 | July 5, 1968 | Liberal | 20 (P. E. Trudeau) |
| 13 | | Jack Davis | July 6, 1968 | March 31, 1969 | Liberal | 20 (P. E. Trudeau) |
Fisheries portfolio moved to Minister of Fisheries and Forestry.

== Ministers of Fisheries and Forestry (1969–1971) ==
Key:

Liberal Party of Canada

| No. | Portrait | Name | Term of office | | Political party | Ministry |
|---|---|---|---|---|---|---|
| 1 | | Jack Davis | April 1, 1969 | June 10, 1971 | Liberal | 20 (P. E. Trudeau) |
Fisheries portfolio held concurrently with Minister of Environment.

== Ministers responsible for Fisheries through the Department of Environment (1971–1979) ==
Key:

Liberal Party of Canada

| No. | Portrait | Name | Term of office | | Political party | Ministry |
Minister of Environment & Minister of Fisheries (held concurrently)
| | | Jack Davis | June 11, 1971 | August 7, 1974 | Liberal | 20 (P. E. Trudeau) |
Minister of State (Fisheries)
| | | Roméo LeBlanc | August 8, 1974 | September 13, 1976 | Liberal | 20 (P. E. Trudeau) |
Minister of Fisheries and the Environment
| | | Roméo LeBlanc | September 14, 1976 | April 1, 1979 | Liberal | 20 (P. E. Trudeau) |
Fisheries portfolio moved to Minister of Fisheries and Oceans.

== Ministers of Fisheries and Oceans (1979–present) ==
Key:

Liberal Party of Canada
Progressive Conservative
Conservative Party of Canada

| No. | Portrait | Name | Term of office | | Political party | Ministry |
Ministers of Fisheries and Oceans
| 1 | | Roméo LeBlanc (1st time) | April 2, 1979 | June 3, 1979 | Liberal | 20 (P. E. Trudeau) |
| 2 | | James McGrath | June 4, 1979 | March 2, 1980 | Progressive Conservative | 21 (Clark) |
| (1) | | Roméo LeBlanc (2nd time) | March 3, 1980 | September 29, 1982 | Liberal | 22 (P. E. Trudeau) |
| 3 | | Pierre de Bané | September 30, 1982 | June 29, 1984 | Liberal | 22 (P. E. Trudeau) |
| 4 | | Herb Breau | June 30, 1984 | September 16, 1984 | Liberal | 23rd (Turner) |
| 5 | | John Fraser | September 17, 1984 | September 23, 1985 | Progressive Conservative | 24 (Mulroney) |
| – | | Erik Nielsen (acting) | September 23, 1985 | November 19, 1985 | Progressive Conservative | 24 (Mulroney) |
| 6 | | Tom Siddon | November 20, 1985 | February 22, 1990 | Progressive Conservative | 24 (Mulroney) |
| 7 | | Bernard Valcourt | February 23, 1990 | April 20, 1991 | Progressive Conservative | 24 (Mulroney) |
| 8 | | John Crosbie | April 21, 1991 | June 24, 1993 | Progressive Conservative | 24 (Mulroney) |
| 9 | | Ross Reid | June 25, 1993 | November 3, 1993 | Progressive Conservative | 25 (Campbell) |
| 10 | | Brian Tobin | November 4, 1993 | January 8, 1996 | Liberal | 26 (Chrétien) |
| – | | David Dingwall (acting) | January 9, 1996 | January 24, 1996 | Liberal | 26 (Chrétien) |
| 11 | | Fred Mifflin | January 25, 1996 | June 10, 1997 | Liberal | 26 (Chrétien) |
| 12 | | David Anderson | June 11, 1997 | August 2, 1999 | Liberal | 26 (Chrétien) |
| 13 | | Herb Dhaliwal | August 3, 1999 | January 14, 2002 | Liberal | 26 (Chrétien) |
| 14 | | Robert Thibault | January 15, 2002 | December 11, 2003 | Liberal | 26 (Chrétien) |
| 15 | | Geoff Regan | December 12, 2003 | February 5, 2006 | Liberal | 27 (Martin) |
| 16 | | Loyola Hearn | February 6, 2006 | October 30, 2008 | Conservative | 28 (Harper) |
| 17 | | Gail Shea | October 30, 2008 | May 18, 2011 | Conservative | 28 (Harper) |
| 18 | | Keith Ashfield | May 18, 2011 | July 15, 2013 | Conservative | 28 (Harper) |
| (17) | | Gail Shea (2nd time) | July 15, 2013 | November 4, 2015 | Conservative | 28 (Harper) |
Ministers of Fisheries, Oceans and the Canadian Coast Guard
| 19 | | Hunter Tootoo | November 4, 2015 | May 31, 2016 | Liberal | 29 (J. Trudeau) |
| 20 | | Dominic LeBlanc | May 31, 2016 | July 18, 2018 | Liberal | 29 (J. Trudeau) |
| 21 | | Jonathan Wilkinson | July 18, 2018 | November 20, 2019 | Liberal | 29 (J. Trudeau) |
| 22 | | Bernadette Jordan | November 20, 2019 | October 26, 2021 | Liberal | 29 (J. Trudeau) |
| 23 | | Joyce Murray | October 26, 2021 | July 26, 2023 | Liberal | 29 (J. Trudeau) |
| 23 | | Diane Lebouthillier | July 26, 2023 | March 14, 2025 | Liberal | 29 (J. Trudeau) |
| 24 | | Joanne Thompson | March 14, 2025 | May 13, 2025 | Liberal | 30 (Carney) |
Minister of Fisheries
| (24) | | Joanne Thompson | May 13, 2025 | Incumbent | Liberal | 30 (Carney) |
