= William Gordon Ernst =

Canadian politician

The Hon. William Gordon Ernst

Member of the Canadian Parliament for Queens—Lunenburg
- In office 1926–1935
- Preceded by: William Duff
- Succeeded by: John James Kinley

Personal details
- Born: October 18, 1897 Mahone Bay, Nova Scotia, Canada
- Died: July 12, 1939 (aged 41)
- Party: Conservative
- Cabinet: Minister of Fisheries (1935)

William Gordon Ernst, PC (Can) MC* (October 18, 1897 – July 12, 1939) was a Canadian politician.

Born in Mahone Bay, Nova Scotia, he first ran for the House of Commons of Canada in the 1925 federal election in the Nova Scotia riding of Queens—Lunenburg. A Conservative, he was defeated but he was elected in the 1926 federal election. He was re-elected in 1930 and defeated in 1935. In 1935, he was the Minister of Fisheries.

He served as a captain in the 85th Canadian Infantry Battalion during World War I and was awarded the Military Cross and Bar.
