= Graham Airdrie Bell =

Canadian civil servant

Major Graham Airdrie Bell, CMG (August 13, 1874 – January 13, 1929) was a Canadian civil servant. He was Deputy Minister of Railways and Canals from 1918/1919 until his death.

== Life and career ==
Bell was born in Perth, Ontario, the son of James Bell, Registrar of Lanark County, and of Marian Graham (Haggart) Bell. He was educated at public schools in Perth and in the town's collegiate institute. He joined the Post Office Department in Ottawa as a clerk in 1890, transferred to the Department of Railways and Canals in 1892.

He was appointed Financial Comptroller in 1908, Assistant to the Minister in 1917, and acting Deputy Minister the same year, when the posts of Assistant to the Minister and Deputy Minister were combined. In 1918, on the retirement of A. W. Campbell, Bell became Deputy Minister. He also served as the Dominion of Canada's representative on the board of Canadian National Railways.

A keen militiaman, he was a member of the 43rd Regiment from 1891 to 1899, where he achieved the rank of major. He went to France and England on a special mission in 1915, during the First World War.

He died of typhoid in Ottawa in 1929. His body was taken by special train to Perth. The Department of Railways and Canals closed on the day of his funeral so as to enable its staff to attend his funeral. He was succeeded as Deputy Minister by R. A. C. Henry.

He was created a CMG in 1917.

== Family ==
Bell married in 1904 Beatrice Burgess, daughter of A. M. Burgess, Deputy Minister of the Interior; they had three sons.
