= George Joseph Desbarats =

George Joseph Desbarats, CMG (1861–1944) was a Canadian engineer and civil servant who served as Deputy Minister and Comptroller of the Naval Service of the Dominion of Canada, then Deputy Minister of National Defence.

He was the son of the printer George-Édouard Desbarats.

Desbarats was appointed a Companion of the Order of St Michael and St George in 1915.
