= Alfred Duranleau =

Canadian politician

The Honourable Alfred Duranleau
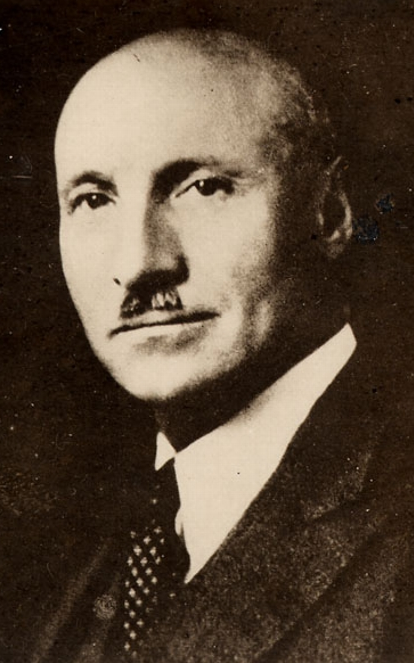

Member of the Canadian Parliament for Chambly-Verchères
- In office 1930–1935
- Preceded by: Aimé Langlois
- Succeeded by: The electoral district was abolished in 1933.

Member of the Legislative Assembly of Quebec for Montréal-Laurier
- In office 1923–1927
- Preceded by: Ernest Poulin
- Succeeded by: Ernest Poulin

Personal details
- Born: November 1, 1871 Farnham, Quebec
- Died: March 11, 1951 (aged 79) Montreal, Quebec
- Resting place: Notre Dame des Neiges Cemetery
- Party: Conservative
- Other political affiliations: Conservative Party of Quebec
- Cabinet: Minister of Marine (1930–1935); Minister of Fisheries (Acting) (1932–1934)

Alfred Duranleau, PC (November 1, 1871 – March 11, 1951) was a Canadian lawyer, politician, and judge.

Born in Farnham, Quebec, the son of Napoléon Duranleau and Adélaïde Patenaude, he was educated as a lawyer and was called to the Quebec Bar in 1897.

In 1923, he was elected to the Legislative Assembly of Quebec for the riding of Montréal-Laurier. A Conservative, he was defeated in 1927.

He was elected to the House of Commons of Canada for the riding of Chambly-Verchères in the 1930 federal election. A Conservative, he was the Minister of Marine from 1930 to 1935 and the Minister of Fisheries (Acting) from 1932 to 1934. From 1935 until his death in 1951, he was a judge on the Superior Court of Quebec. He was entombed at the Notre Dame des Neiges Cemetery in Montreal.
