= Minister of Pensions and National Health (Canada) =

Minister of Pensions and National Health was an office in the Cabinet of Canada from 1928 to 1944 who oversaw the Department of Pensions and National Health.

Prior to 1928, certain responsibilities of the Pensions and National Health portfolio were carried out by the now-defunct post of Minister of Soldiers' Civil Re-establishment. That office, along with The Department of Health Act, were abolished and the office of Minister of Pensions and National Health was created on 1928 June 11 by Statute 18-19 George V, c. 39.

In 1944, the portfolio was divided to create the posts of Minister of National Health and Welfare and Minister of Veterans Affairs.

== History ==
Before 1872, the Department of Agriculture was responsible for public health across Canada. After that, the responsibility was divided among the Department of Marines and Fisheries, Agriculture, and Inland Revenue. The department of Finance and the Commission of Conservation were responsible for addressing tuberculosis, while a National Council of Health operated under the Commission of Conservation for other public health matters. Given the division of responsibility, The Canadian Medical Association and The Canadian Public Health Association to repeatedly urge the government to establish a Department of Health. Over the years, various public organizations, especially women's societies, presented petitions to the Government requesting the creation of the Department. In 1919, the Department of health was finally created with specific responsibilities and powers assigned to its branches.

== Ministers of pensions and national health ==
No.	Name	Period in office	Ministry
1.	James King	June 11, 1928 – June 18, 1930	William Lyon Mackenzie King
2.	James Ralston	June 19, 1930 – August 7, 1930	William Lyon Mackenzie King
3.	Murray MacLaren	August 7, 1930 – November 16, 1934	Richard Bedford Bennett
4.	Donald Matheson Sutherland	November 17, 1934 – October 23, 1935	Richard Bedford Bennett
5.	Charles Power	October 24, 1935 – September 18, 1939	William Lyon Mackenzie King
6.	Ian Alistair Mackenzie	September 19, 1939 – July 4, 1944	William Lyon Mackenzie King
