= Department of Soldiers' Civil Re-establishment =

The Department of Soldiers' Civil Re-establishment was established by the Dominion Government of Canada in 1918 to handle the major problem of returning Canadian servicemen to civilian life after the First World War. In 1928 it merged with the Department of Health to form the Department of Pensions and National Health, with its former responsibilities being carried out by the Pensions Division (later Pensions Branch).

The department employed 9,035 staff in March 1920, its peak period of operation, rapidly reducing to 5,485 by March 1921.

== Medical facilities ==
The department took over responsibility for the Military Hospitals Commission, which ran convalescent hospitals and homes for wounded soldiers. On 31 March 1921, the Commission's hospitals were caring for 6,264 in-patients (of whom 889 were being treated for mental problems and 1,376 for tuberculosis) and 540 out-patients. It directly or indirectly operated 31 hospitals and sanatoria, with total bed provision of 6,781. These included two psychopathic institutions for mental cases.

The Department's Medical Branch also operated a Social Service Section to care for out-patients who had tuberculosis, neurological or mental conditions, could not work, or were disadvantaged in the labour market because of their injuries. The Foreign Relations Section dealt with former members of the Canadian forces receiving treatment abroad and former members of British or Allied forces being treated in Canada.

The department also had a Dental Branch which worked in the treatment of men with jaw injuries and others in need of major dental care.

== Care and retraining of disabled men ==
The department also paid disability allowances: initially $33 per month for a man without dependants, and $73 for a married man with no children, with extra allowances for children. On 1 September 1920, these sums were increased to $45 and $86 respectively.

Canada was one of the first Allied countries to implement a system of retraining for its wounded soldiers. Drawing from the experience of Belgium and France in 1914, in 1915 the Military Hospitals Commission was authorised to provide facilities for vocational training in cooperation a network of provincial commissions. At the peak of the program March 1920, 26,000 men were undergoing such training, 11,500 who had enlisted as minors in the Canadian Expeditionary Force.

Occupational therapy was also being pioneered in the hospitals. By March 1921, 51,000 men had undertaken training in 421 occupations, of whom 72 per cent had since found work in that occupation. In general, men were trained in a trade related to their previous trade, but which they were able to do with their particular disability.

1,966 Canadian servicemen had their sight affected in the war, of whom 110 had been completely or nearly completely blinded. Those in this condition were offered retraining at St Dunstan's Hostel, Regent's Park, London, or at the Canadian National Institute for the Blind, Pearson Hall, Toronto, at which further courses and the provision of aftercare were also available. Blind soldiers were trained in massage, poultry farming, carpentry, piano tuning, stenography, broom-making, and telegraphy.

The department operated a large artificial limb and surgical appliance factory, mainly employing disabled ex-servicemen, at 47 Buchanan Street, Toronto, with fitting depots in all the major cities. There was also an experimental branch which developed new designs and improvements.

== Employment facilities ==
350,000 men returned to the employment market in 1918 and 1919. The department assisted them with finding jobs. The Provincial Governments and the Dominion Department of Labour worked to establish at least one employment office in every city in Canada, and information on vacancies was exchanged between areas for men willing to travel. A special fare rate of ¢1 per mile was arranged with the railways. Men were also assisted with adjustments in business and family affairs. All this assistance ended in June 1920, except in regards to disabled men.

== Monetary relief and loans ==
Parliament voted nearly $5 million for winter unemployment relief to returned soldiers in 1919. The distribution was administered jointly by the department and the Canadian Patriotic Fund, and the first payments were made at Christmas 1919. More limited grants were also made in the winter of 1920–1921, mainly to sick, disabled or pensioned men or those with dependants. The maximum monthly allowance was $50 to a single man and $75 to a married man, with $12 for the first child and $10 for the second (boys under 16 or girls under 17).

The department also made loans of up to $500 (interest free, repayable within 5 years) to disabled ex-servicemen who had been retrained (for the purchase of tools and other equipment), and to those who had not been retrained (to enable them to follow a training or educational course interrupted by the war, if their disability made such assistance necessary). This was administered by a special division of the Vocational Branch. These loans had been taken up by 1,630 men by March 1921.

== Ministers of Soldiers' Civil Re-establishment ==
The office of Minister of Soldiers' Civil Re-establishment was created by Order in Council dated 21 February 1918, pursuant to the War Measures Act. Statutory provision for the office was made by Statute 8-9 Geo. V, c. 42, and assented to on 24 May 1918.

1.	Senator Sir James Alexander Lougheed	February 21, 1918 - July 10, 1920	under Prime Minister Sir Robert Borden
	vacant	July 10, 1920 - July 18, 1920	under Prime Minister Arthur Meighen
2.	Senator Sir James Alexander Lougheed (acting)	July 19, 1920 - September 21, 1921	under Prime Minister Arthur Meighen
3.	Robert James Manion	September 22, 1921 - December 29, 1921	under Prime Minister Arthur Meighen
4.	Senator Henri Sévérin Béland	December 29, 1921 - April 14, 1926	under Prime Minister William Lyon Mackenzie King
5.	John Campbell Elliott	April 14, 1926 - June 28, 1926	under Prime Minister William Lyon Mackenzie King
6	Robert James Manion (acting)	June 29, 1926 - July 12, 1926	under Prime Minister Arthur Meighen
7.	Raymond Ducharme Morand (acting)	July 13, 1926 - August 22, 1926	under Prime Minister Arthur Meighen
8.	Eugène Paquet	August 23, 1926 - September 25, 1926	under Prime Minister Arthur Meighen
4.	James Horace King	September 25, 1926 - June 10, 1928	under Prime Minister William Lyon Mackenzie King

== See also ==
- Soldier Settlement Board
