= Registrar General of Canada =

Role held by the Minister of Industry

- Registraire général du Canada
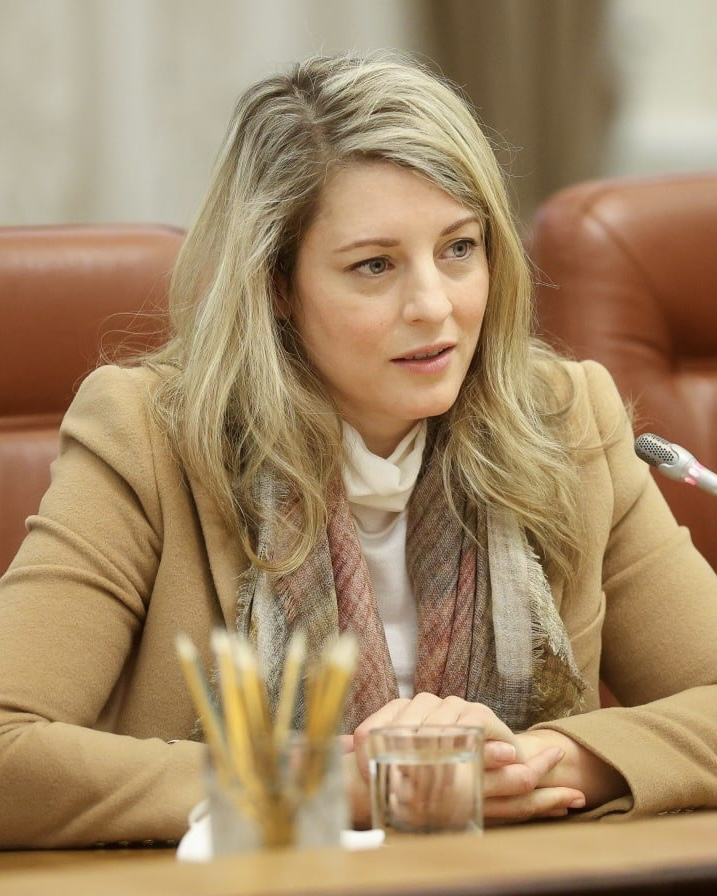
- Incumbent; Mélanie Joly since May 13, 2025
- Department of Industry
- Style: The Honourable
- Appointer: Monarch (represented by the governor general); on the advice of the prime minister
- Term length: While holding the office of Minister of Industry
- Precursor: Secretary of State for Canada
- Inaugural holder: Guy Favreau
- Formation: October 1, 1966

The registrar general of Canada (French: registraire général du Canada) is responsible for registering all letters patent, commissions, instruments, proclamations, and any other documents that may, from time to time, be issued under the Great Seal of Canada or the Privy Seal of Canada. The registrar general is a role held by the Minister of Industry, which as of May 13, 2025, is Mélanie Joly.

== Appointment ==
The registrar general is not appointed directly — rather, a person becomes the registrar general by virtue of being the minister of industry, a Cabinet office. Therefore, by proxy, the registrar general is appointed by the governor general, on the advice of the prime minister.

The current minister of industry and registrar general of Canada is Mélanie Joly since May 13, 2025. Since November 20, 2019, the ministerial position has been styled as "Minister of Innovation, Science and Industry."

== Role and responsibilities ==
=== Registering documents ===
A rendition of the current Great Seal of Canada, first unveiled in June 2025 during the reign of King Charles III

The Office of the Registrar General is responsible for registering documents that have been issued under the Great Seal and the Privy Seal. Such documents can include the appointments of senators, puisne justices, and governors general. The registrar general maintains a registry of the documents so issued, with the assistance of Corporations Canada.

=== Keeping the Great Seal ===
While the governor general is the keeper of the Great Seal, he or she normally entrusts the Registrar General with the seal's safekeeping. The Great Seal is used to certify official state documents. The current Seal went into use in 2025 during the 2025 royal visit to Canada.

== History ==
Before Confederation there were two registrars general, appointed as the provincial secretaries of Upper Canada and Lower Canada. After Confederation in 1867, the secretary of state for Canada executed the functions of the registrar general. In 1966, the registrar general was created as a separate ministerial office. The following year in 1967, the Department of Registrar General was abolished and its functions assigned to the minister of consumer and corporate affairs. In 1995, several portfolios were reorganized and the minister of consumer and corporate affairs portfolio was merged with the minister of industry portfolio, which is today responsible for performing the duties of the registrar general.

== Provincial or territorial registrars general ==
Each province and territory has a registrar general responsible for vital statistics, namely birth, marriage and death certificates.

== See also ==
- Keeper of the Seals
