= Support our troops =

Slogan commonly used in the US and Canada

Awareness ribbons

Red, white, and blue ribbon

Red, white, and blue: U.S. patriotism

Red ribbon (troops)

Red: Armed forces support; Canadian patriotism

Red ribbon

Yellow: Armed forces return

Support our troops (French: Appuyons nos troupes; Spanish: Apoya a nuestras tropas) is a slogan commonly used in the United States and Canada in reference to each country's military forces or troops. The slogan has been used during recent conflicts, including the Gulf War and the Iraq War.

The slogan is sometimes seen as overgeneralizing complex issues; for example, an individual may support personnel in the military but not the current respective government's foreign policy.

== Yellow Ribbon ==
The Yellow "Support Our Troops" Ribbon image is a registered trademark (Application number: 0918155) of the Minister of National Defence of Canada administered by Canadian Forces Morale and Welfare Services (CFMWS) on behalf of the members of the Canadian Forces. As such it is a protected image that may only be used with the explicit permission of the Canadian Forces Morale and Welfare Services and Support Our Troops.

The Yellow Ribbon Image is available to all divisions of Personnel and Family Support Services, both operational and support, for their own direct purposes, both Public and Non-Public. CANEX is the official and only vendor of authorized merchandise and apparel that features the Yellow Ribbon image. The Yellow Ribbon Image cannot be used by any 3rd party for the purposes of advertising their own goods and services. The usage of the Yellow Ribbon is only authorized in conjunction with Support Our Troops fundraising or sponsorship events or activities.

CANEX in partnership with ServiceOntario created Ontario vanity licence plates featuring the Yellow Ribbon, the Support Our Troops logo.

== Red Friday ==
Groups have advocated the wearing of red on Fridays, in an event known as Red Friday, to show their support for all members of the armed forces abroad, regardless of the circumstances under which they were deployed.

=== Red Friday in Canada ===
People in Canada have worn red on Fridays to show support for troops serving in the Canadian Forces. Red is chosen because it is an official Canadian color, and historically is a color of remembrance because it symbolizes the red poppies in Flanders Fields and the loss of life that the country has endured.

Many positions in the House of Commons do not allow employees to dress outside of uniform, but allow staff to wear a red ribbon as a compromise. This is the only exception to these dress codes other than wearing a poppy for Remembrance Day.

== Related ideas ==
Awareness ribbons are short pieces of ribbon folded into a loop (or representations of such) that are used in countries such as the United States, Canada, Australia, and the UK as a way for the wearer to make a subtle statement of support for a cause or issue. A yellow ribbon is a symbol with various meanings, mostly associated with those waiting for the return of a loved one or of military troops who are temporarily unable to come home.

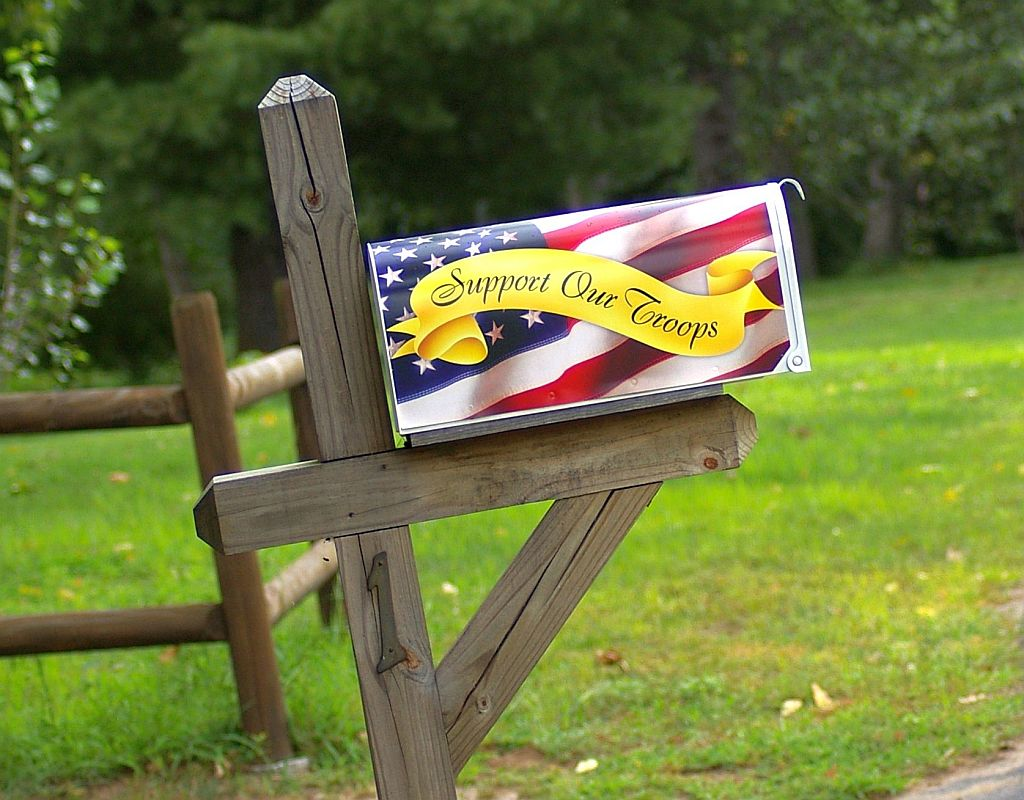
A yellow ribbon "support our troops" mailbox

A service flag in the United States is an official banner that family members of service members serving in the Armed Forces of the United States during any period of war or hostilities can display.

== Criticism and opponents ==
Political analyst Noam Chomsky has criticized the slogan as a form of media manipulation, saying,

[...] the point of public relations slogans like "Support Our Troops" is that they don't mean anything [...] that's the whole point of good propaganda. You want to create a slogan that nobody is going to be against and I suppose everybody will be for, because nobody knows what it means, because it doesn't mean anything. But its crucial value is that it diverts your attention from a question that does mean something, do you support our policy? And that's the one you're not allowed to talk about.

Others have shown how the phrase can be used as a motte-and-bailey fallacy, when an arguer starts with pro-war claims but, when challenged on the details, retreats to the less controversial, "but don't you support our troops?"

The phrase "Support our troops" was used in the title of the heavily anti-war Xiu Xiu song "Support Our Troops OH! (Black Angels OH!)" from Fabulous Muscles.

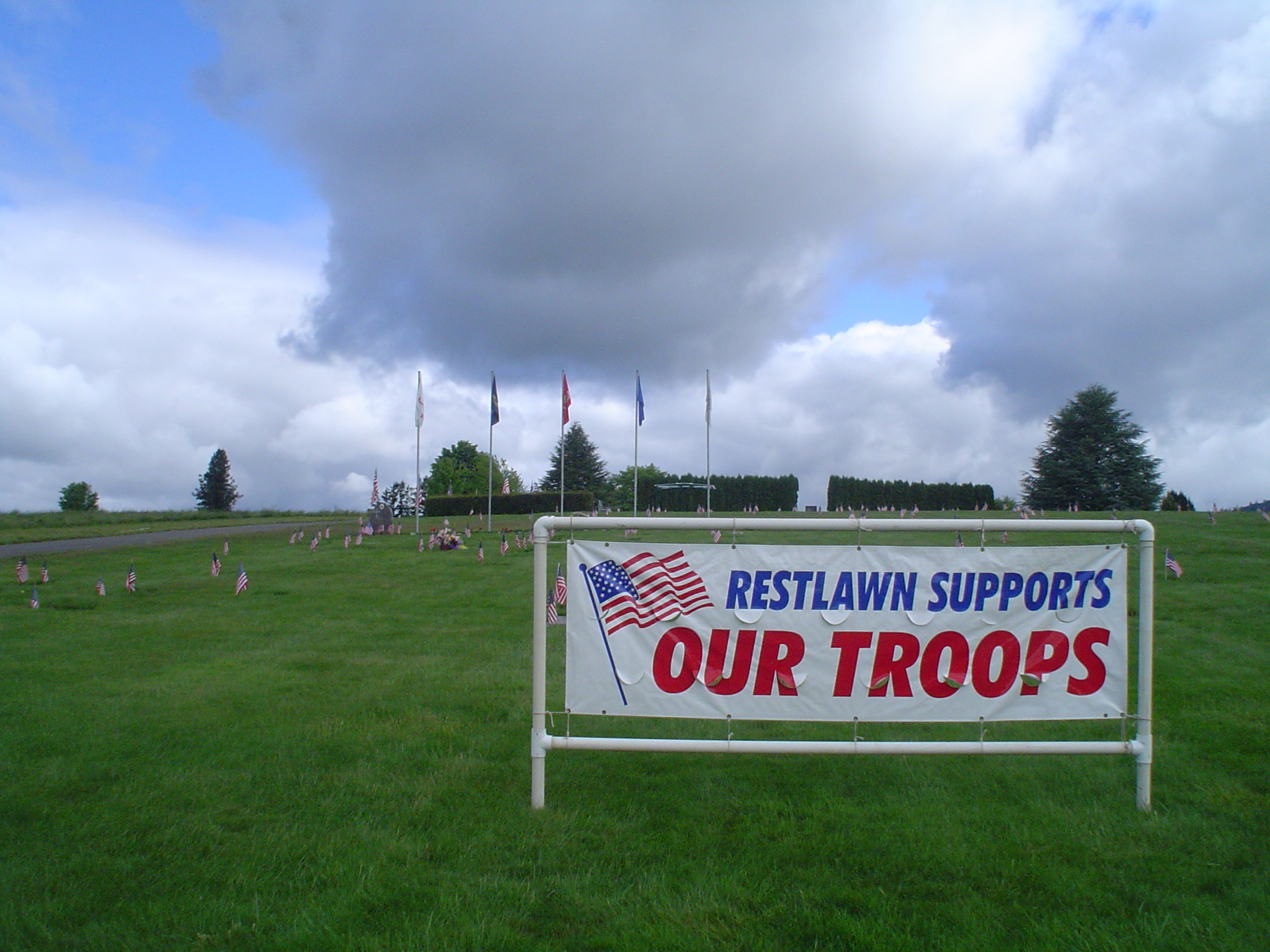
"Support our troops" sign on cemetery lawn in Independence, Oregon.

== See also ==
General

- Memorial Day
- POW/MIA flag
- Remembrance Day
- Tomb of the Unknowns
- The Unknown Warrior
- Veterans Day
- War on terrorism

Anti-war

- Criticism of the war on terrorism
- Joel Stein
- Opposition to the Iraq War
- Opposition to the Vietnam War

Other

- Canada's role in the invasion of Afghanistan
- Iraq War troop surge of 2007
- Militarization
- Patriotism
- Popular opinion in the US on the invasion of Iraq
