= Minister of National Defence =

Many countries give the title minister of national defence or minister of national defense to their Defence ministers, including:

- Minister of National Defence (Angola)
- Minister of National Defence (Burundi)
- Minister of National Defense (Cambodia)
- Minister of National Defence (Canada)
- Minister of National Defence for Air (Canada)
- Minister of National Defence for Naval Services (Canada)
- Minister of National Defense (Chile)
- Minister of National Defence (Colombia)
- Minister of National Defence (Greece)
- Minister of National Defence (Guatemala)
- Minister of National Defence (Lithuania)
- Minister of National Defence (PRC)
- Minister of National Defence (Poland)
- Minister of National Defence (Turkey)
