= Minister of National Defence (Canada) =

- Ministre de la Défense nationale

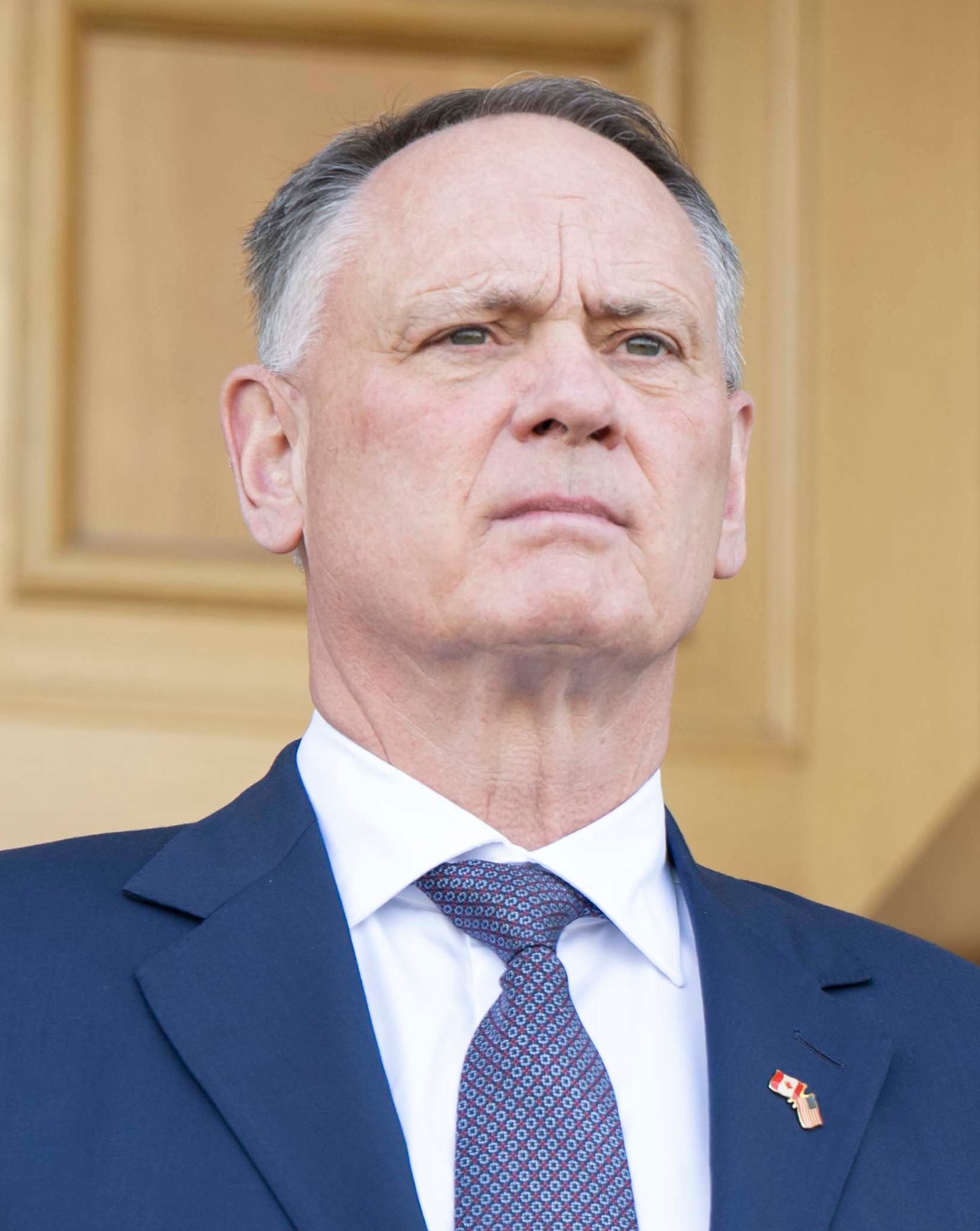
- Incumbent; David McGuinty since May 13, 2025
- Department of National Defence; Canadian Armed Forces; Canadian Coast Guard
- Style: The Honourable
- Abbreviation: MND
- Member of: House of Commons; Privy Council; Cabinet
- Reports to: Parliament; Prime Minister
- Appointer: Monarch (represented by the governor general); on the advice of the prime minister
- Term length: At His Majesty's pleasure
- Precursor: Minister of Aviation; Minister of Militia and Defence; Minister of the Naval Service
- Inaugural holder: George Perry Graham
- Formation: January 1, 1923
- Salary: $299,900 (2024)
- Website: forces.gc.ca

The minister of national defence (MND; French: ministre de la défense nationale) is a minister of the Crown in the Cabinet of Canada responsible for the management and direction of all matters relating to the national defence of Canada.

The Department of National Defence is headed by the deputy minister of national defence (the department's senior civil servant), while the Canadian Armed Forces are headed by the chief of the Defence Staff (the senior serving military officer). Both are responsible to the minister of national defence. The King (represented by the governor general of Canada) is Commander-in-Chief of the Canadian Forces and has final authority on all orders and laws for the "defence of the realm".

The minister is responsible, through the tenets of responsible government, to Parliament for "the management and direction of the Canadian Forces". Any orders and instructions for the Canadian Armed Forces are issued by or through the chief of the defence staff. The Department of National Defence exists to aid the minister in carrying out his responsibilities, and acts as the civilian support system for the Canadian Forces.

The current minister of national defence is David McGuinty. The parliamentary secretary, who represents the minister when he is away from the House of Commons, is Sherry Romanado.

== History ==
On January 1, 1923, the National Defence Act, 1922 came into effect, merging the Department of Militia and Defence, the Department of the Naval Service, and the Air Board to form the Department of National Defence. The ministerial heads of the former departments, the minister of militia and defence, the minister of the naval service, and the minister of aviation were merged to form a new position, the minister of national defence.

During the Second World War, the minister of national defence was assisted by two subordinate ministers. The minister of national defence for air was an additional minister in the Department of National Defence responsible for the Royal Canadian Air Force; while the minister of National Defence for Naval Services was another minister in the Department of National Defence responsible for the Royal Canadian Navy. The air and naval post was reincorporated into the portfolio of the minister of national defence following the Second World War.

The Munsinger affair was Canada's first national political sex scandal in 1966. The affair involved Gerda Munsinger, a German citizen who had been convicted in Germany as a common prostitute, a petty thief and a smuggler, who emigrated to Canada in 1956 in spite of a warning card dated 1952, and who was in 1960 the mistress of the former Associate Minister of National Defence Pierre Sévigny. Munsinger was "a self-admitted espionage agent" in the employ of the "Russian Intelligence Service".

Canadian military spending
Military spending: as percent share of GDP (1950–2020)
Canadian military spending
Military spending: Constant 2019 USD million (1953–2020)

== The Defence Portfolio ==
The Defence Portfolio is a collection of organizations and agencies that report to the minister of national defence. Although deputy heads for individual agencies direct and oversee the activities of their agency, the minister is accountable to Parliament for its activities. The Defence Portfolio includes:

- Canadian Armed Forces
- Canadian Coast Guard
- Communications Security Establishment
- Defence Research and Development Canada
- Department of National Defence
- Cadets Canada and Junior Canadian Rangers
- Military Grievances External Review Committee
- Canadian Forces Housing Agency
- Canadian Forces Personnel Support Agency
- Judge Advocate General
- Military Police Complaints Commission
- National Search and Rescue Secretariat
- Office of the Chief Military Judge
- Office of the Legal Advisor to the Department of National Defence and the Canadian Forces (DND/CF LA)
- Office of the National Defence and Canadian Forces Ombudsman

The minister of national defence is also the designated lead minister for search and rescue (LMSAR) within the federal government.

== List of ministers ==
Key:

Liberal Party of Canada
Historical conservative parties: Liberal-Conservative, Conservative (historical), Unionist, National Liberal and Conservative, Progressive Conservative
Conservative Party of Canada

| No. | Portrait | Name | Term of office | | Political party | Ministry |
|---|---|---|---|---|---|---|
| 1 | | George Perry Graham | January 1, 1923 | April 27, 1923 | Liberal | 12 (King) |
| 2 | | Edward Mortimer Macdonald | April 28, 1923 (Acting until Aug.17) | June 28, 1926 | Liberal | 12 (King) |
| 3 | | Hugh Guthrie | June 29, 1926 (Acting until Jul.13) | September 25, 1926 | Conservative (historical) | 13 (Meighen) |
| – | | Vacant | September 25, 1926 | September 30, 1926 | — | 14 (King) |
| – | | James Robb (Acting) | October 1, 1926 | October 7, 1926 | Liberal | 14 (King) |
| 4 | | James Ralston (1st time) | October 8, 1926 | August 7, 1930 | Liberal | 14 (King) |
| 5 | | Donald Matheson Sutherland | August 7, 1930 | November 16, 1934 | Conservative (historical) | 15 (Bennett) |
| 6 | | Grote Stirling | November 17, 1934 | October 23, 1935 | Conservative (historical) | 15 (Bennett) |
| 7 | | Ian Alistair Mackenzie | October 24, 1935 | September 18, 1939 | Liberal | 16 (King) |
| 8 | | Norman McLeod Rogers | September 19, 1939 | June 10, 1940 | Liberal | 16 (King) |
| – | | Charles Power (Acting) | June 11, 1940 | July 4, 1940 | Liberal | 16 (King) |
| (4) | | James Ralston (2nd time) | July 5, 1940 | November 1, 1944 | Liberal | 16 (King) |
| 9 | | Andrew McNaughton | November 2, 1944 | August 20, 1945 | Military | 16 (King) |
| 10 | | Douglas Abbott | August 21, 1945 | December 9, 1946 | Liberal | 16 (King) |
| 11 | | Brooke Claxton | December 10, 1946 | November 15, 1948 | Liberal | 16 (King) |
| 11 | | Brooke Claxton | November 15, 1948 | June 30, 1954 | Liberal | 17 (St. Laurent) |
| 12 | | Ralph Campney | July 1, 1954 | June 20, 1957 | Liberal | 17 (St. Laurent) |
| 13 | | George Pearkes | June 21, 1957 | October 10, 1960 | Progressive Conservative | 18 (Diefenbaker) |
| 14 | | Douglas Harkness | October 11, 1960 | February 3, 1963 | Progressive Conservative | 18 (Diefenbaker) |
| – | | Vacant | February 4, 1963 | February 11, 1963 | — | 18 (Diefenbaker) |
| 15 | | Gordon Churchill | February 12, 1963 | April 21, 1963 | Progressive Conservative | 18 (Diefenbaker) |
| 16 | | Paul Hellyer | April 22, 1963 | September 18, 1967 | Liberal | 19 (Pearson) |
| 17 | | Léo Cadieux | September 18, 1967 | April 19, 1968 | Liberal | 19 (Pearson) |
| 17 | | Léo Cadieux | April 20, 1968 | September 16, 1970 | Liberal | 20 (P. E. Trudeau) |
| – | | Charles Drury (1st time; Acting) | September 17, 1970 | September 23, 1970 | Liberal | 20 (P. E. Trudeau) |
| 18 | | Donald Macdonald | September 24, 1970 | January 27, 1972 | Liberal | 20 (P. E. Trudeau) |
| 19 | | Edgar Benson | January 28, 1972 | August 31, 1972 | Liberal | 20 (P. E. Trudeau) |
| – | | Jean-Eudes Dubé (Acting) | September 1, 1972 | September 6, 1972 | Liberal | 20 (P. E. Trudeau) |
| – | | Charles Drury (2nd time; Acting) | September 7, 1972 | November 26, 1972 | Liberal | 20 (P. E. Trudeau) |
| 20 | | James Richardson | November 27, 1972 | October 12, 1976 | Liberal | 20 (P. E. Trudeau) |
| 21 | | Barney Danson | October 13, 1976 (Acting until Nov.3) | June 3, 1979 | Liberal | 20 (P. E. Trudeau) |
| 22 | | Allan McKinnon | June 4, 1979 | March 2, 1980 | Progressive Conservative | 21 (Clark) |
| 23 | | Gilles Lamontagne | March 3, 1980 | August 11, 1983 | Liberal | 22 (P. E. Trudeau) |
| 24 | | Jean–Jacques Blais | August 12, 1983 | June 29, 1984 | Liberal | 22 (P. E. Trudeau) |
| 24 | | Jean–Jacques Blais | June 30, 1984 | September 16, 1984 | Liberal | 23 (Turner) |
| 25 | | Robert Coates | September 17, 1984 | February 11, 1985 | Progressive Conservative | 24 (Mulroney) |
| 26 | | Erik Nielsen | February 12, 1985 (Acting until Feb.26) | June 29, 1986 | Progressive Conservative | 24 (Mulroney) |
| 27 | | Perrin Beatty | June 30, 1986 | January 29, 1989 | Progressive Conservative | 24 (Mulroney) |
| 28 | | Bill McKnight | January 30, 1989 | April 20, 1991 | Progressive Conservative | 24 (Mulroney) |
| 29 | | Marcel Masse | April 21, 1991 | January 3, 1993 | Progressive Conservative | 24 (Mulroney) |
| 30 | | Kim Campbell | January 4, 1993 | June 24, 1993 | Progressive Conservative | 24 (Mulroney) |
| 31 | | Tom Siddon | June 25, 1993 | November 3, 1993 | Progressive Conservative | 25 (Campbell) |
| 32 | | David Collenette | November 4, 1993 | October 4, 1996 | Liberal | 26 (Chrétien) |
| 33 | | Doug Young | October 5, 1996 | June 10, 1997 | Liberal | 26 (Chrétien) |
| 34 | | Art Eggleton | June 11, 1997 | June 25, 2002 | Liberal | 26 (Chrétien) |
| 35 | | John McCallum | June 26, 2002 | December 11, 2003 | Liberal | 26 (Chrétien) |
| 36 | | David Pratt | December 12, 2003 | July 19, 2004 | Liberal | 27 (Martin) |
| 37 | | Bill Graham | July 20, 2004 | February 5, 2006 | Liberal | 27 (Martin) |
| 38 | | Gordon O'Connor | February 6, 2006 | August 14, 2007 | Conservative | 28 (Harper) |
| 39 | | Peter MacKay | August 14, 2007 | July 15, 2013 | Conservative | 28 (Harper) |
| 40 | | Rob Nicholson | July 15, 2013 | February 9, 2015 | Conservative | 28 (Harper) |
| 41 | | Jason Kenney | February 9, 2015 | November 4, 2015 | Conservative | 28 (Harper) |
| 42 | | Harjit Sajjan | November 4, 2015 | October 26, 2021 | Liberal | 29 (J. Trudeau) |
| 43 | | Anita Anand | October 26, 2021 | July 26, 2023 | Liberal | 29 (J. Trudeau) |
| 44 | | Bill Blair | July 26, 2023 | March 14, 2025 | Liberal | 29 (J. Trudeau) |
| 44 | | Bill Blair | March 14, 2025 | May 13, 2025 | Liberal | 30 (Carney) |
| 45 | | David McGuinty | May 13, 2025 | Incumbent | Liberal | 30 (Carney) |

== Ministers with military experience ==
| Name | Rank | Branch | Position (if applicable) / Unit(s) |
|---|---|---|---|
| James Ralston | Colonel | Canadian Expeditionary Force (CEF) | Commanding Officer, 85th (Nova Scotia Highlanders) Battalion, CEF |
| Donald Matheson Sutherland | Lieutenant Colonel | CEF | Officer Commanding, 52nd Battalion (New Ontario) and A Company 1st Battalion, Major, A Squadron 24th Regiment Grey's Horse |
| Andrew McNaughton | General | CEF / Canadian Militia / Permanent Active Militia | Commanding Officer, 5th Battalion Canadian Mounted Rifles and Canadian Corps |
| Ralph Campney | Lieutenant | CEF / Canadian Army / Royal Flying Corps | No.5 Stationary or General Hospital (Queen's), Commissioned Officer, 19th Canadian Infantry Battalion |
| Norman McLeod Rogers | Lieutenant | CEF | 6th Nova Scotia Mounted Rifles |
| Charles Gavan Power | Acting Major | CEF | Canadian Corps |
| Brooke Claxton | Battery Sergeant-Major | | Victoria Rifles of Canada |
| George Pearkes | Major General | CEF / Canadian Militia and Canadian Army | Commanding Officer, Canadian Corps |
| Douglas Harkness | Lieutenant Colonel | Canadian Army | Royal Canadian Artillery |
| Gordon Churchill | Lieutenant Colonel | CEF | Vickers Machine Gunner, Commanding Officer Fort Garry Horse and 1st Canadian Carrier Regiment (Canadian Corps) |
| Paul Hellyer | Gunner | Canadian Army | Royal Canadian Artillery |
| Charles Drury | Brigadier General | Canadian Army | Commanding Officer, 4th Field Regiment Royal Canadian Artillery, General Staff Officer of the 2nd Canadian Division and acting commander of the Royal Artillery 4th Canadian Division |
| Edgar Benson | Sergeant | Canadian Corps (Canadian Army) | 1st Survey Regiment, Royal Canadian Artillery |
| Barney Danson | Lieutenant | Canadian Army | The Queen's Own Rifles of Canada |
| James Armstrong Richardson | Pilot Officer | RCAF | Consolidated Liberator anti-submarine patrol squadron of the (No. 10 Squadron RCAF) |
| Allan McKinnon | Major | Canadian Army | Royal Regiment of Canadian Artillery and Princess Patricia's Canadian Light Infantry |
| Gilles Lamontagne | Flight Lieutenant | RCAF | bomber pilot No. 425 Bomber Squadron |
| Erik Nielsen | Pilot Officer (RAF) / Adjutant (RCAF) | Royal Flying Corps / RCAF | 101 Squadron and 126 Squadron; RCAF Legal Officer |
| Gordon O'Connor | Brigadier General | Canadian Army | Royal Canadian Armoured Corps |
| Harjit Sajjan | Lieutenant Colonel | Canadian Army | The British Columbia Regiment (Duke of Connaught's Own), Royal Canadian Armoured Corps |

Bill Graham was enrolled under the University Naval Training Division of the Royal Canadian Naval Reserve and received commission as sub lieutenant in 1960. Graham did not serve in the Navy following his commission and thus does not have military experience.

== See also ==
- Minister of Overseas Military Forces – communications channel for the MMD and British War Office in matters relating to Canadian military units from 1916 to 1920
