= VetVerify.org =

- Company type: Subsidiary
- Website type: Veterans benefits, United States government
- Available in: English
- Headquarters: Dallas, Texas; United States
- Key people: Tom Shull
- Parent: Army & Air Force Exchange Service; Navy Exchange Service Command; Marine Corps Exchange
- Website: vetverify.org
- Registration: Required
- Launched: June 5, 2017; 9 years ago
- Current status: Active

VetVerify.org is a shared online service of the Army & Air Force Exchange Service, the Navy Exchange Service Command, the Marine Corps Exchange and the Coast Guard Exchange. Its sole purpose is to verify eligibility for the veterans online shopping benefit, a 2017 expansion of online military exchange shopping privileges to honorably discharged Veterans.

== History ==
=== Veterans online shopping benefit ===
On June 14, 2012, the Army & Air Force Exchange Service appointed its first civilian director/CEO, Tom Shull, a West Point graduate who previously served as CEO of Wise Foods, Hanover Direct, Barneys New York and Meridian Ventures. On May 8, 2014, Shull drafted a memorandum to the then-acting Under Secretary of Defense for Personnel and Readiness Jessica Wright proposing a plan to allow honorably discharged veterans to shop online at military exchanges.

Shull presented a business case for the expanded benefit to the Department of Defense's Executive Resale Board in August 2014, emphasizing the plan's potential to generate more than $100 million for installation quality-of-life programs within three years. The Executive Resale Board voted unanimously to recommend the proposal in August 2016.

On Jan. 13 2017, the Department of Defense announced that all honorably discharged veterans would be eligible to shop tax-free online military exchanges starting Nov. 11, 2017. The expanded benefit is expected to make online exchange privileges available to all honorably discharged veterans from a total of approximately 21 million veterans.

=== Website launch ===
The military exchanges announced the launch of VetVerify.org on June 5, 2017, adding that some veterans would be selected to shop ahead of the Nov. 11 launch as beta testers. By July 26, VetVerify.org had received 260,000 applications and verified 120,000 veterans.

Military exchanges annually distribute more than $300 million in earnings back to the military community in the form of dividends to quality-of-life programs such as Morale, Welfare and Recreation. Allowing veterans to shop online could provide tens of millions in additional contributions to such programs.

== Verification Process ==
To register, users must provide their first and last names, the last four digits of their social security number, date of birth, email address and branch of service. VetVerify.org then confirms the user's eligibility using Defense Manpower Data Center data, the most comprehensive collection of data on veterans. If an applicant cannot be immediately verified, they may submit a digital copy of their discharge paperwork to be reviewed for eligibility.

== Celebrity Endorsements ==
In July 2017, former United States Navy SEAL Marcus Luttrell appeared in a 30-second Facebook video alongside Mark Wahlberg, who played Luttrell in "Lone Survivor," urging veterans to register at VetVerify.org. The video went viral, causing a spike in traffic to the site and driving a 60 percent increase in number of successful verifications on the weekend of the video's launch.

== See also ==
- Base exchange
