= CANEX =

Canadian military retail exchange service

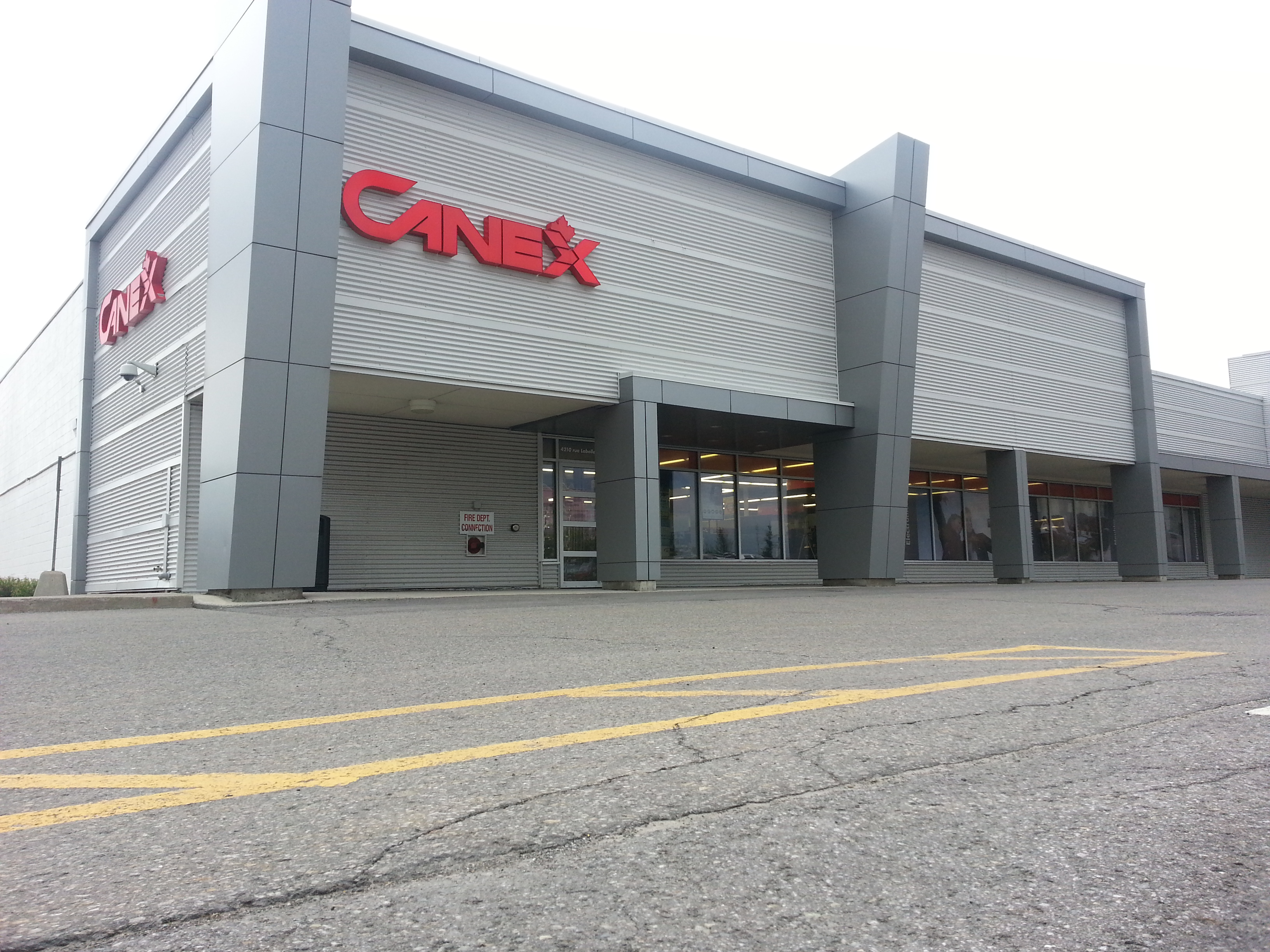
- Ottawa retail outlet
- Industry: Retail
- Founded: 1968
- Headquarters: Canada
- Area served: Canadian military communities
- Products: A combination of retail stores, grocery stores, ExpressMarts (with or without gasoline sales), snack bars, coffee shops (branded CANEX and Tim Hortons), restaurants (branded CANEX, Pizza Pizza and Subway), barber shops and vending operations. CANEX also has concession agreements with tailors, real estate offices, travel agents, credit unions and medical and dental offices.
- Owner: Non-Public Funds of the Canadian Forces
- Parent: CFMWS
- Website: www.canex.ca

The Canadian Forces Exchange System, or CANEX, is a commercial service of the Canadian Forces Morale and Welfare Services. First established in 1968, it is tasked with supporting the Canadian Forces operational effectiveness, contributing to morale, esprit de corps and unit cohesion. CANEX operates merchandising operations (retail outlets) and provides CF members with Advantage Programs at CF bases, wings, and units throughout Canada. In Europe, similar facilities are operated in Germany for NATO.

== History ==
In 1967, the Defence Council approved the formation of CANEX and shortly thereafter, in 1968, CANEX commenced business. For the next 22 years, CANEX operated under local management, with policy direction emanating from National Defence Headquarters (NDHQ).

In March 1990, CANEX was restructured as a line organization, operating as a field unit of ADM (HR-Mil). In 1996, the Canadian Forces Personnel Support Agency (CFPSA) stood up, with CANEX as a division of CFPSA. In 2008, CFPSA became Canadian Forces Personnel and Family Support Services (CFPFSS). Overall direction for CFPFSS and CANEX is provided by the Non-Public Property Board, which includes representatives from each of the CF commands.

== CANEX customers ==
Authorized patrons of CANEX facilities include:

- members of the Regular Force and their dependants
- former members of the Regular Force in receipt of an annuity under the Canadian Forces Superannuation Act (CFSA), Defence Services Pension Continuance Act (DSPCA), or a pension under the Pension Act or War Veterans Allowance Act, and their survivors
- former CF members who served on active service in the naval, army, or air forces raised in Canada during time of war
- current and former Reserve Force members
- dependants of Reserve Force members, when the Reserve Force member is on Class C service or Class B service over 180 days
- members of the Royal Canadian Mounted Police and their dependants
- Department of National Defence (DND) Public Service employees and their families, including casual employees and civilian employees under full-time contract to DND, who are resident or employed on a unit or other element of DND
- former DND Public Service employees receiving a pension for DND service
- foreign military personnel on duty in Canada, and their dependants
- members of the Canadian Corps of Commissionaires or other security force when residing or employed on a unit
- Non-Public Funds (NPF) staff and their dependants
- former NPF staff receiving a pension for Non-Public Property (NPP) service
- Military Family Resource Center (MFRC) employees and their dependants

== Operations ==
CANEX outlets include a combination of retail stores, grocery stores, and ExpressMarts (with or without gasoline sales). CANEX also operates snack bars, coffee shops (branded CANEX and Tim Hortons), restaurants (branded CANEX, Pizza Pizza and Subway), barber shops and vending operations.

In addition, CANEX also has various concession agreements with independent businesspeople who supply supplementary services to the military community. Examples of these special services include tailor shops, real estate offices, travel agents, credit unions and medical/dental offices to name a few.

=== Proceeds ===
Proceeds from CANEX operations are distributed to base, wing and unit funds, to be used to finance a wide variety of social and recreational programs for the benefit of military personnel and their dependents. Physical fitness, sports and recreational programs are among the main recipients of CANEX proceeds; examples of these programs include skating, curling and swimming, as well as on-base Scouts and Guide programs, libraries, hobbyist activities and more.

CANEX proceeds also help support military financial services offered under Personal Support Programs (PSP), such as low cost loans and grants to CF members and their families. These funds are further used to financially assist bases/wings/units through grants from Canadian Forces Central Fund for special projects, which are not subject to public funding.

In addition to funding Morale and Welfare programs, the CANEX earnings are used to fund capital investments such as building new stores or renovating existing facilities.

== See also ==
- Base exchange
- NAAFI, United Kingdom equivalent
- Army & Air Force Exchange Service and the Navy Exchange, US equivalents
