= Department of Militia and Defence =

Agency overview
- Formed: 1868
- Dissolved: 1921
- Superseding agency: Canadian Militia
- Headquarters: Ottawa, Ontario

The Department of Militia and Defence was the government department responsible for military land forces in Canada from 1868 to 1921.

The Minister of Militia and Defence was in charge of this department.

The department was created by the Militia Act in 1868. In 1906, when the British Army withdrew its forces stationed in Canada, the department remained in place to support the Permanent Active Militia and Non-Permanent Active Militia, the names for Canadian land forces.

In 1921 the Royal Canadian Navy was transferred to the Department of Militia and Defence from the Department of Marine and Fisheries and the Naval Service. In the same year, the department was renamed the Department of Militia and Defence and the Naval Service. In 1922 the name of the department was changed to the Department of National Defence with the merger of the Air Board.
