= Permanent Active Militia =

Standing army of Canada from 1855 to 1940

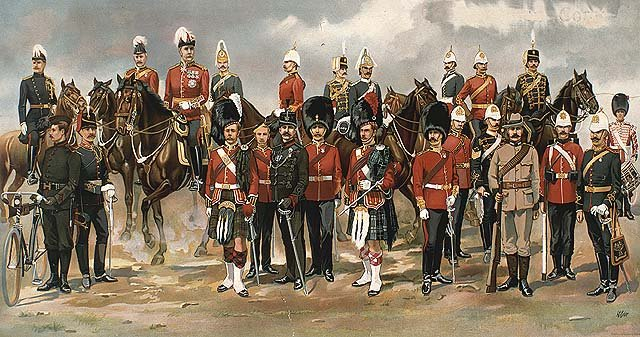
- Uniforms of The Canadian Militia, 1898
- Active: 1855–1940; Reformed into the Canadian Army (Active)
- Country: Province of Canada (1855–1867); Canada (1867–1940)
- Type: Army
- Part of: Canadian Militia
- Engagements: Fenian raids Wolseley expedition North-West Rebellion; Second Boer War; World War I World War II

Commanders
- Commander-in-chief: Monarch represented by Governor General of the Province of Canada (1855–1867); Governor General of Canada (1867–1940)
- Ministers: Minister of Militia and Defence (1855–1921); Minister of National Defence (1921–1940)
- Military commander: Commander-in-Chief, North America (1855–1875); General Officer Commanding the Canadian Militia (1875–1904); Chief of the General Staff (1904–1940)

Permanent Active Militia (PAM), also known as Permanent Force (PF), was the proper name of Canada's full-time professional land forces from 1855 to 1940, when it was reorganized into the Canadian Army. PAM was in effect Canada's standing army, consisting of one regular infantry regiment and two cavalry regiments in 1914.

The counterpart to PAM was the Non-Permanent Active Militia (NPAM), which referred to the reserve force of the Canadian Militia. PAM and NPAM were distinct forces from the sedentary militias raised in Canada. Both organizations were reorganized into the Canadian Army in 1940.

== History ==
As the British began to withdraw soldiers from British North America in the decades after the War of 1812, the Parliament of the Province of Canada passed the Militia Act of 1855, creating the Active Militia. The Active Militia, later split off into the Permanent Active Militia (PAM), the Militia's regular armed unit (although it continued to use the label militia), and the Non-Permanent Active Militia (NPAM), the Canadian Militia's military reserve force. After PAM's formation, the remaining sedentary militia regiments that made up the Canadian Militia were collectively referred to as the Reserve Militia.

Following Canadian Confederation in July 1867, PAM was managed by the Canadian Minister of Militia. PAM was mobilized on a number of occasions in the latter half of the 19th century, including the Fenian raids, the Wolseley expedition, the North-West Rebellion, and the Second Boer War. The Second Boer War saw more than 8,000 volunteers raised for service in South Africa, from a number of militia regiments in Canada, including PAM.

=== 20th century ===
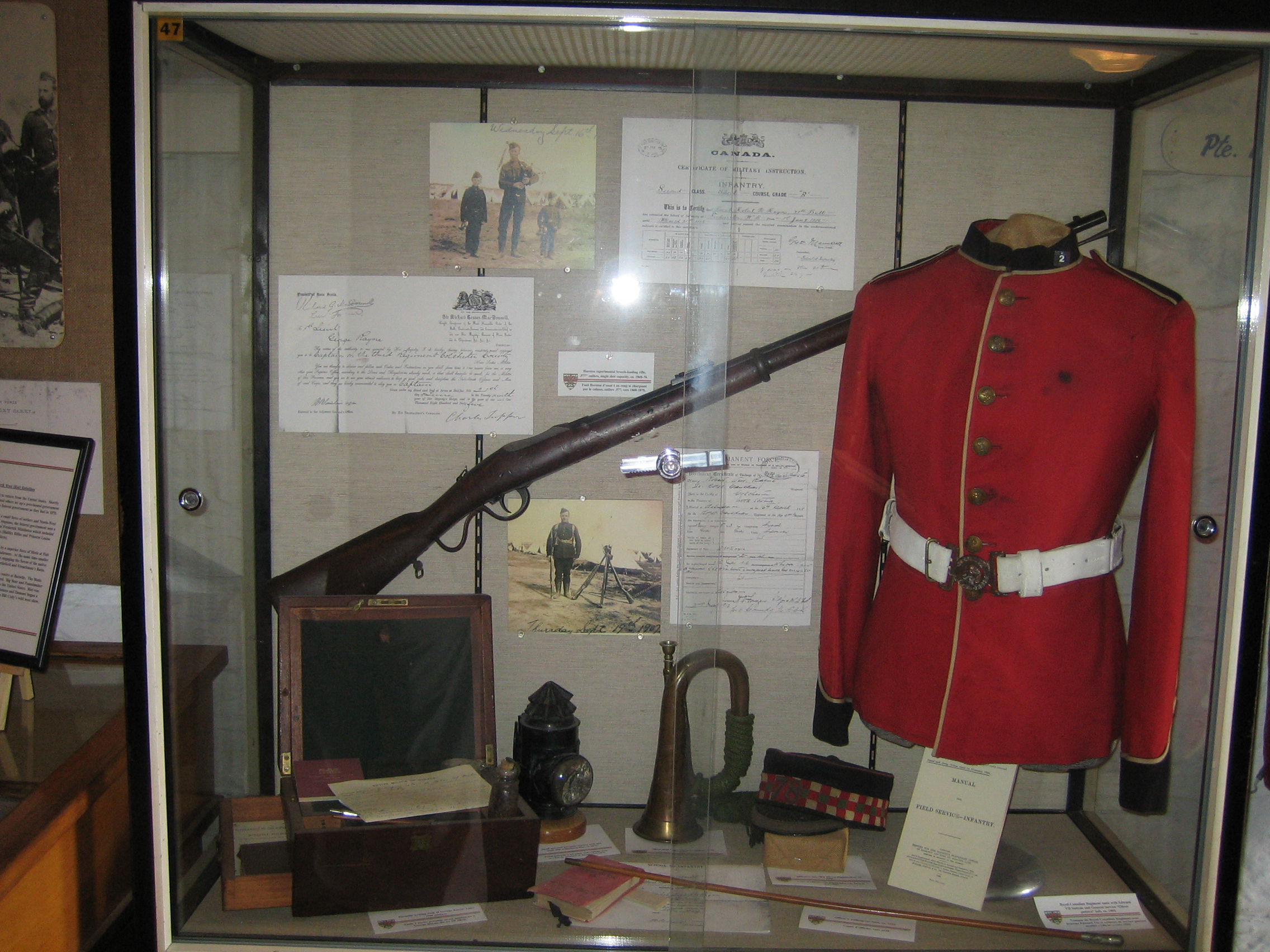
Equipment used by members of the Permanent Active Militia, c. 1900, at the Army Museum in Citadel Hill.

A number of administrative reforms were instituted after the war, with the establishment of the Canadian Army Service Corps in 1901, and the Royal Canadian Engineers, Canadian Army Medical Corps, Canadian Ordnance Corps, and the Signalling Corps in 1903. On 1 April 1914, PAM had an authorized force of 3,110 soldiers of all ranks, and 684 horses. It comprised two cavalry regiments (Royal Canadian Dragoons, Lord Strathcona's Horse), the Royal Canadian Horse Artillery, the Royal Canadian Garrison Artillery, and the Royal Canadian Regiment.

PAM was not directly mobilized during World War I; Canadian soldiers served overseas after enlisting in the Canadian Expeditionary Force (CEF), a separate force managed by the Ministry of Overseas Military Forces. However, the Royal Canadian Regiment, an infantry regiment under PAM, was deployed to the Imperial fortress of Bermuda in order to relieve the 2nd Battalion, The Lincolnshire Regiment from garrison duty. The members of the regiment were later redeployed to France in November 1915, where its members were integrated with the CEF. It was replaced at Bermuda successively by the 38th Battalion (Ottawa), CEF, 77th Battalion, CEF, and 163rd Battalion (French-Canadian), CEF.

As World War I drew to a close in 1918, and the CEF expected to disband, plans to re-organize the Canadian Militia were initiated under the Otter Commission. The Commission proposed that PAM field a force of six infantry divisions and one cavalry division, supplemented by personnel from NPAM. Additionally, the Otter Commission saw links of perpetuation created, for battle honours earned from units of the CEF with units of the Canadian Militia. Following the results of the Otter Commission, two more infantry regiments were integrated into PAM, 22nd Battalion (French Canadian) of the CEF (later renamed the Royal 22nd Regiment), and Princess Patricia's Canadian Light Infantry.

In the midst of demobilization after the end of World War I, PAM strength was reduced to nearly its pre-World War I levels, with 381 officers, and 3744 soldiers of other ranks. The force would maintain this relative size until the eve of World War II. In 1923, PAM was tasked with the operation of the Northwest Territories and Yukon Radio System. In the Interwar period, PAM was occasionally mobilized in order to maintain "peace," between strikers and business owners during strikes. From 1932 to 1936, PAM was involved in the operation of unemployment camps, jointly with the Department of Labour.

At the outbreak of World War II in 1939, PAM fielded a force of 455 officers, and 3,714 soldiers of all other ranks. During World War II, the Permanent Force was renamed the Canadian Army (Active); it later became known as the Canadian Army Active Force, Canadian Army (Regular), and Force Mobile Command following Unification on February 1, 1968. On July 8, 2013, by order of the Minister of National Defence, the name reverted to the Canadian Army.

== Equipment ==
- Lee–Enfield (SMLE) Mark III – 1916–1943
- M1911 pistol
- Smith & Wesson 2nd Model "Hand Ejector" Revolver
- Lewis machine gun
- M1919 Browning machine gun
- Bren light machine gun

== See also ==
- Canadian Militia
- Canadian Army
- Canadian Forces Primary Reserve
- History of the Canadian Army
- List of regiments of cavalry of the Canadian Militia (1900–1920)
