= Canadian Militia =

Historical combat forces in Canada

The Canadian Militia is a historical title for military units raised for the defence of Canada. The term has been used to describe sedentary militia units raised from local communities in Canada; as well as the regular army for the Province of Canada and post-confederated Canada, referred to as the active militias.

The earliest militia units in Canada dates back to 16th century in New France. In the French colony, a compulsory militia of settlers from every parish was raised in order to support the military of New France in the defence and expansion of the colony. Sedentary militia units were also raised by the British, to defend its colonies and to support British military operations on the continent. The sedentary militia eventually fell into disuse in the late-19th century, although vestiges of the sedentary militia system continued into the early-20th century.

The Canadian Militia also referred to the regular army established by the Province of Canada under the Militia Act of 1855. The two organizations that originated from the act, the Permanent Active Militia (PAM), and the Non-Permanent Active Militia (NPAM), continued to serve as Canada's regular army following Canadian Confederation in 1867. In November 1940, both PAM and NPAM were reorganized as the Canadian Army, with PAM becoming the Army's Regular Force, and NPAM becoming the Army Reserve. The Army Reserve continues to be informally referred to as the militia in Canada.

== Sedentary militias ==
Enrolment in a local sedentary unit was required in the French colony of New France, and the various colonies of British North America; with these sedentary militia units occasionally conducting drills and training exercises, as well as participating in an annual reviews.

Prior to Canadian Confederation, the Province of Canada, and the colonies of Atlantic Canada maintained their own militias. Enrolment in the sedentary militias continued for several years after Canadian Confederation, although the practice was ended shortly afterwards, superseded by the active militias. The colonies of British Columbia and Vancouver Island did not require its residents to enrol with a sedentary militia unit, although locally raised "volunteer corps" were established.

=== New France ===
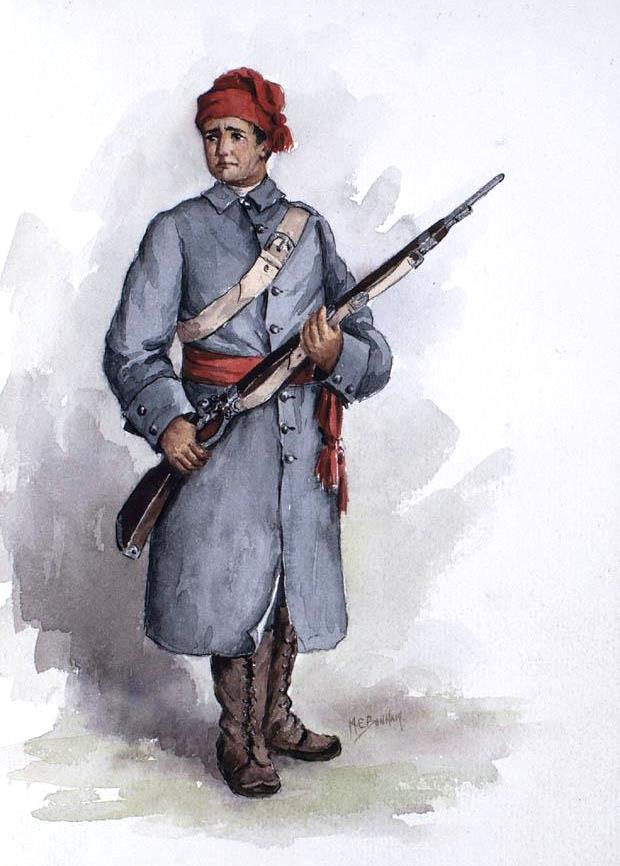
French Canadian militiaman in 1759

Use of militias in Canada date back to New France. As the militias in New France were formally maintained by the intendant of New France, the system became a basis for centralized administration in the colony. Local militia captains were appointed by the intendant, and typically assisted the civil administration with road-building, and periodic censuses.

The first unit of militia in New France, the Fraternité de la très Sainte-Vierge was established in 1650 in Montreal. In 1651, Pierre Boucher received a commission of captain from the governor of New France and asked to raise militia corps in Trois-Rivières.

In 1669, King Louis XIV, concerned about the colony's inability to defend itself adequately against raids, ordered the creation of a compulsory militia that would include every fit male between 16 and 60 years of age. They were organized into companies, usually one per church parish, and structured in the same way as a regular French infantry company. The Governor General, Louis de Buade de Frontenac, arranged during the 1690s to provide all militiamen with clothing and equipment. This consisted generally of a capote, a breechcloth, leggings, a blanket, moccasins, a knife and two shirts, The clothing did not constitute a military uniform but was simply Canadian-style civilian wear. Since these men were not paid, this was a relatively economical way of maintaining an effective militia. The men were noted as excellent shots (most came with their own rifle, powder and bullets), and in better physical condition than regulars, because of their tough life, farming, fishing and hunting. Volunteer militiamen were used to support the regulars and their First Nation allies on lengthy raids, where they absorbed the skirmishing tactics of the latter. However, little time was spent on conventional European drill.

=== British-rule and post-Confederation ===
Following the British conquest of New France, local militia units continued to be raised, and support British soldiers stationed in British America/British North America. The Canadian militia system remained largely intact under British rule, with many former officers of the New French militia receiving commissions from the British to continue their duties. The first real change was introduced in 1777, when the Province of Quebec enacted its first militia legislation. The legislation drew upon pre-existing militia laws from New France, although it also incorporated elements from the 1758 Militia Act enacted in Nova Scotia, such as the establishment of a defined military age.

Members of the militia of the Province of Quebec first saw service with the British during Pontiac's War, when a battalion of three hundred Canadien volunteers took part in Brigadier-General John Bradstreet's expedition to Detroit. The battalion was led by former members of the New French troupes de la marine. British authorities also mustered the militia in Quebec during the American Revolutionary War, whose members constituted most of the defenders at the Battle of Quebec. However, Canadien militias saw little expeditionary action during the American Revolution, with Frederick Haldimand, the Governor of Quebec, uncertain if the Canadien militias would remain loyal should they encounter the French Royal Army.

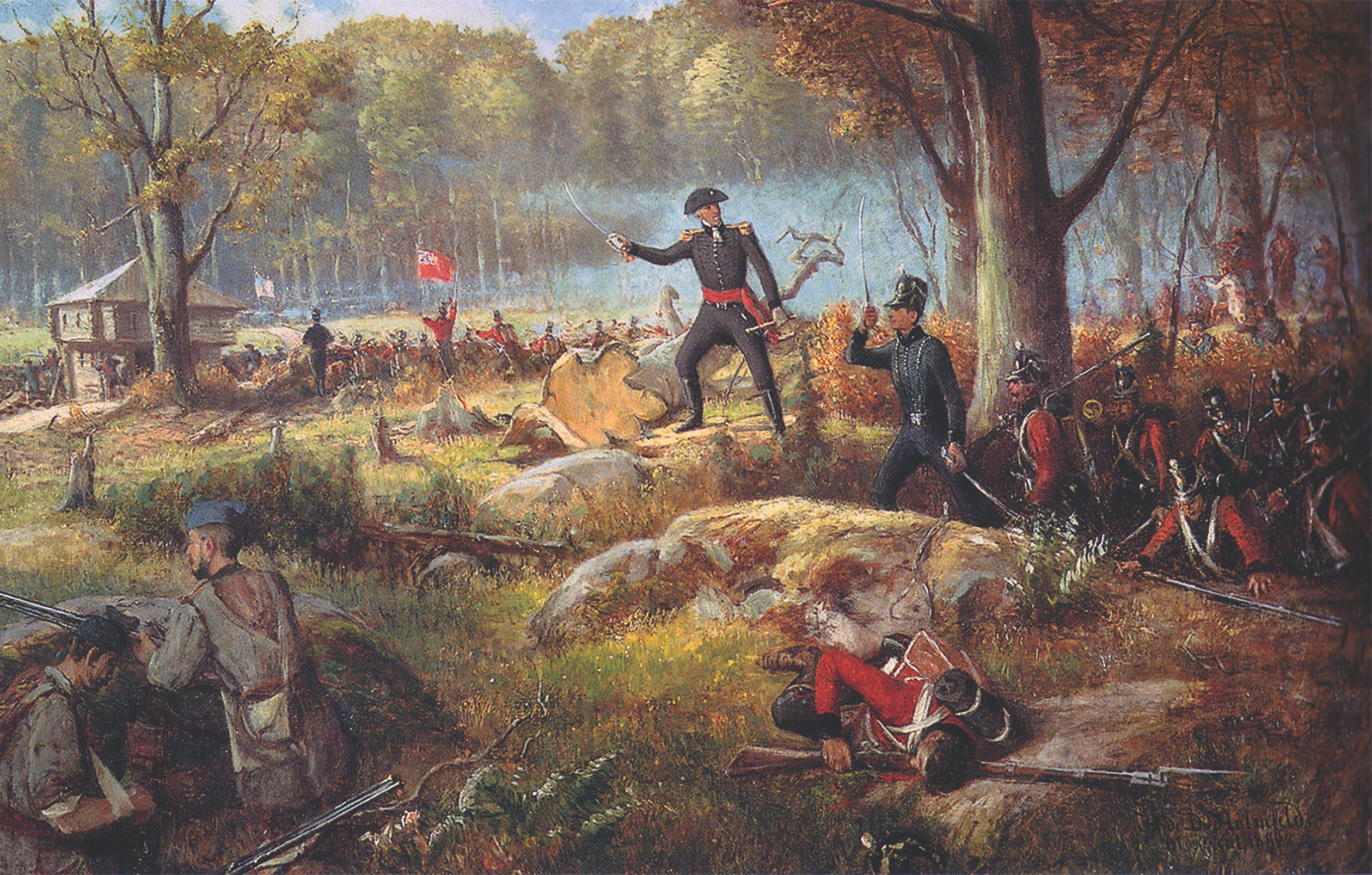
Canadian militiamen, fencibles, and First Nations during the Battle of the Chateauguay, 1813.

While British North American colonies were expected to maintain a colonial militia, the militias were financed by the British government. Given the British government's preoccupation with Napoleonic France in the early 19th century, militias in the Canadas saw a shortage of supplies and weapons with limited funds provided for the militias during that period. Compulsory militia service for male inhabitants aged 16 to 60 was introduced in Lower Canada in 1803 and Upper Canada in 1808. In peacetime, compulsory service was typically limited to a single annual muster. In 1811, the militia strength of Upper Canada was approximately 11,000, although Isaac Brock, the Lieutenant Governor of Upper Canada, estimated that only 4,000 could be reliably expected to answer roll call. Early in his tenure as Lieutenant Governor, Brock passed legislation that allowed for him to train 2,000 volunteers, or men chosen by ballot, to serve as the flank companies for the Upper Canadian militia. During the War of 1812, British authorities raised a number of Canadian military and militia units to support the British in defending the Canadas.

In 1840, the sedentary militias of the Canadas were made up of 426 battalions, with 235,000 men registered on militia rolls. Sedentary militia were also present in Maritime colonies, with 40,997 reported in Nova Scotia's militia, while the New Brunswick militia reported 27,532 members in 1845. Prince Edward Island fielded a militia of approximately 8,000 men in 1845. During the Trent Affair in 1861, Nova Scotia revived compulsory militia service, enrolling 59,379 men in the Nova Scotia militia, of which 45,600 were armed. The Militia Act of 1868 extended the sedentary militia system of the former Province of Canada to the newly formed Canadian dominion. In 1869, the Minister of Militia and Defence, George-Étienne Cartier, reported that 618,896 men were enrolled with the sedentary militia or "Reserve Militia".

The sedentary militia system fell into disuse during the 1870s and 1880s, as annual musters became increasingly sporadic. By 1883, the formal requirement to hold an annual muster was stricken from legislation, and in 1904, the provision that formally made every male inhabitant of military age a member of the sedentary Reserve Militia was removed. Although the Reserve Militia was an unorganized service and virtually non-existent by the early-20th century, an officers' roll for the sedentary service was maintained as late as 1921.

== Active militias ==
As the British withdrew soldiers from British North America in the decades following the War of 1812, pressure fell on the Parliament of the Province of Canada to provide for its own defence. The Militia Act of 1855 was passed after a commission on militia reform suggested the sedentary force be supplanted with uniformed volunteer regiments. The resulting act led to the creation of the Active Militia, in an effort to bolster the colony's defences.

The Active Militia was later split into the Permanent Active Militia (PAM), the forces' standing army; and the Non-Permanent Active Militia (NPAM), a force that acted as a military reserve force. Members of the Active Militia were mobilized during the Fenian raids of 1866.

=== Post-Confederation militia ===
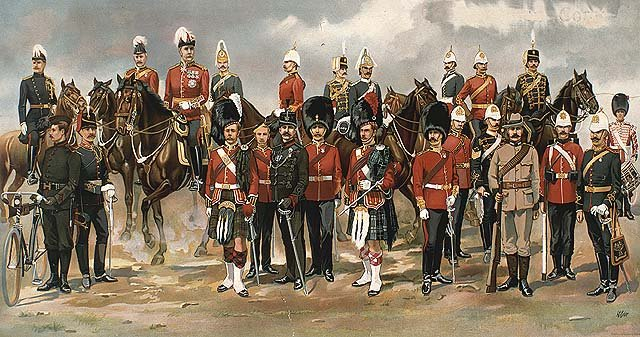
Various uniforms used by members of the Canadian Militia, 1898.

Following Canadian Confederation in July 1867, both PAM, and NPAM were managed by the Canadian Minister of Militia. The Militia Act of 1868 formally extended the Active Militias system of the former Province of Canada to the newly formed Canadian dominion. In 1869, George-Étienne Cartier reported that 37,170 volunteers were enrolled with the Active Militias. However, funding remained an issue for the militia in the 1870s, and 1880s, with British officers urging the Canadian government to either increase the militia's funding, or reduce militia enrolments until its units can be sufficiently trained and equipped.

The Active Militias were mobilized on a number of occasions in the latter half of the 19th century, including the Fenian raids of 1870–71, the Wolseley expedition, the North-West Rebellion, and the Second Boer War. The Second Boer War saw more than 8,000 volunteers raised for service in South Africa, from 82 different militia units.

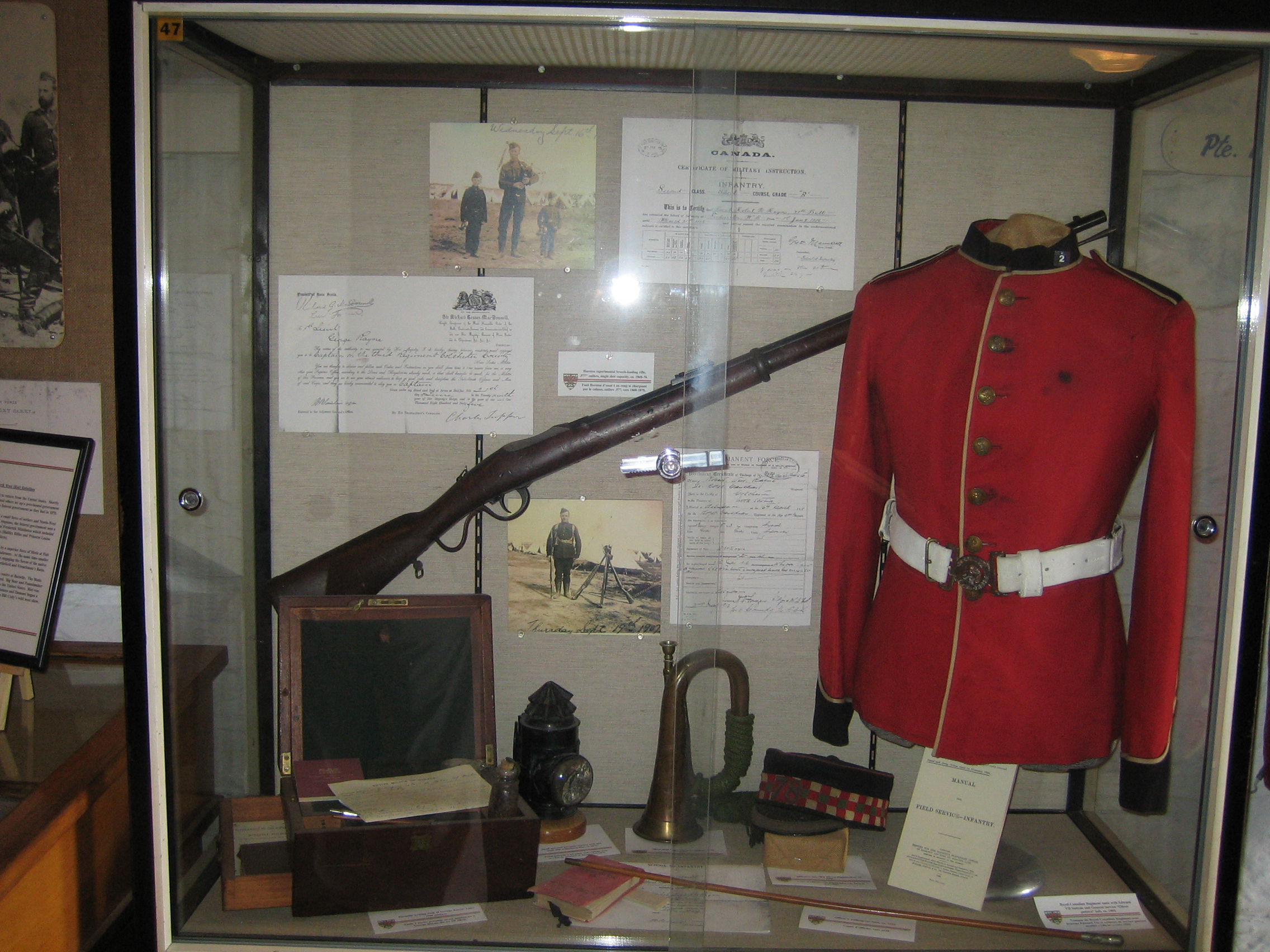
Infantry equipment used by the Permanent Active Militia, c. 1900s.

From 1875 to 1904, the officer heading the Canadian Militia was the General Officer Commanding the Canadian Militia (GOC), a position legally required to be held by an officer of the British Army. However, serious differences in opinion over divisions of responsibilities between the civil and military branches of the Militia Department would see the post virtually abolished under the Militia Act of 1904. The office of the GOC was replaced by the Militia Council. The six member council included the Minister of Militia serving as the council's president, another civilian member, typically the Deputy Minister of Militia, and four members drawn from the Canadian military, the Chief of General Staff, the Adjutant General, the Quartermaster General, and the Master General of the Ordnance. Although modelled after the British Army Council, the Militia Council was purely an advisory body, with the Minister holding supreme authority over it; and the Chief of General Staff becoming the premier military member of the council.

The militia also saw several administrative reforms instituted in the early 1900s, with the establishment of the Canadian Army Service Corps in 1901; the Canadian Military Engineers, the Ordnance Stores Corps, and the Signalling Corps in 1903; and the Permanent Active Militia Medical Corps in 1904.

==== World Wars and Interwar period ====
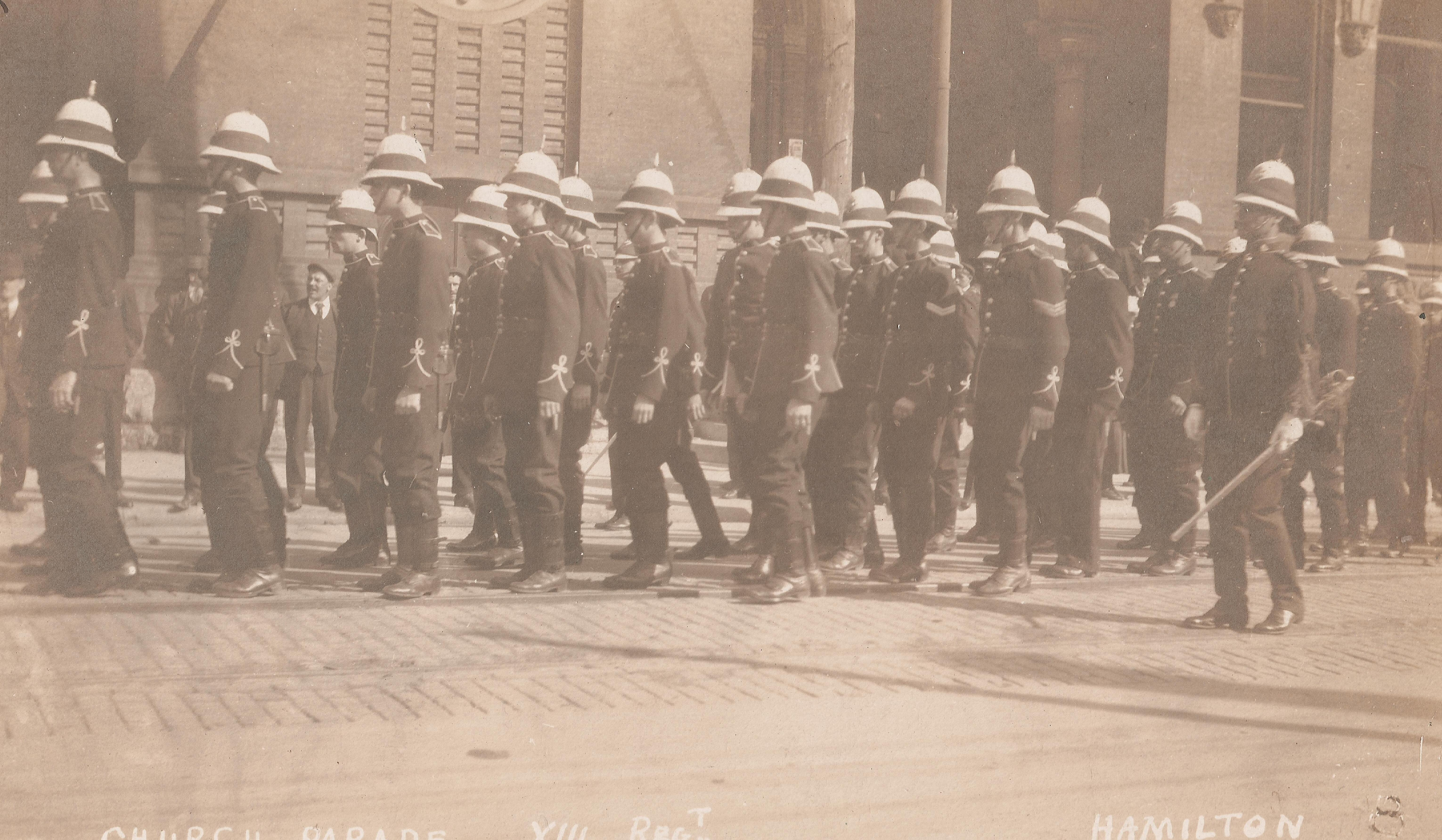
Parade of the 13th Royal Regiment, Canadian Militia in Hamilton, 1915

During World War I, the militia was not mobilized, with Canadians serving overseas enlisting with the Canadian Expeditionary Force (CEF), a separate military field force managed by the Ministry of Overseas Military Forces. As World War I drew to a close and the CEF expected to disband, the Otter Commission was launched in an effort to reorganize the Canadian militia. The Commission proposed that PAM field a force of six infantry divisions, one cavalry division, supplemented by personnel from NPAM. Additionally, the Otter Commission saw links of perpetuation created between CEF and Canadian Militia units; permitting militia units to perpetuate the battle honours earned by CEF units disbanded after the First World War.

Improvements to both PAM's and NPAM's officer corps were undertaken in the 1930s, with PAM officers directing officer cadets through courses such as the "Advanced Militia Staff Course," beginning in 1935. As a result, the Militia fielded a much larger officer corps in 1939, when compared to 1914; with the Canadian Militia fielded approximately 5,000 officers spread throughout PAM and NPAM. However, training within the Canadian Militia remained an issue, with little regimental or larger formation training taking place during the interwar period.

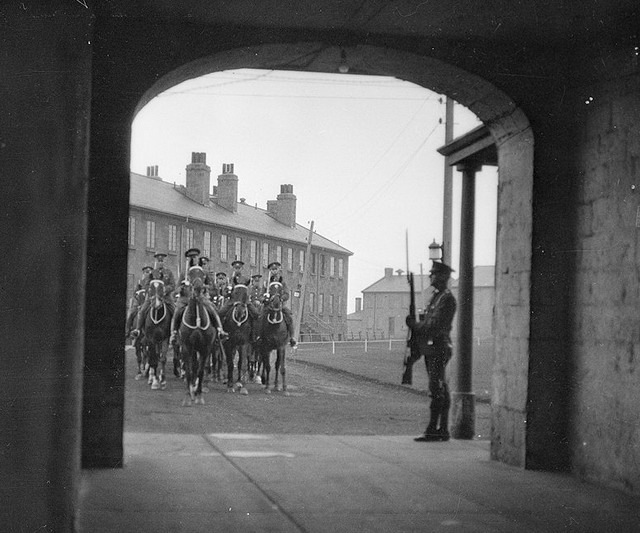
The Royal Canadian Dragoons leaving Stanley Barracks, 1925. The Dragoons was a cavalry regiment with the Militia.

In 1938, Ian Alistair Mackenzie, the Minister of National Defence, began to encourage General Harry Crerar, Chief of Defence Staff, to plan contingencies for the militia to prepare for expeditionary action, in the event of a war between Germany and the British Empire, without the consent of William Lyon Mackenzie King, the Prime Minister of Canada. Crerar sought to reorganize the Canadian Militia to new standards adopted by the British, mechanize the militia, and prepare PAM, and NPAM for combat in a temperate climate, which was the expected climate they would be operating in. However the General Staff's proposal to prepare a 60,000 man force to assist the British in the event of a war was not presented until 29 August 1939, days before the start of the war.

On the eve of World War II, the Canadian Militia's nominal strength was over 50,000 men, with PAM fielding 455 officers, and 3,714 soldiers of all other ranks; whereas NPAM fielded 5,272 officers, and 41,249 soldiers of all other ranks. However, the Canadian Militia was not prepared to undertake an overseas campaign at the outbreak of World War II. Colonel Charles Perry Stacey, a military historian for the Canadian Army from 1940 to 1959, on the readiness of the Canadian Militia at the eve of the Second World War,

The tiny Permanent Force did not constitute a striking force capable either of counter attack against a major raid or of expeditionary action. The Non-Permanent Active Militia, with its limited strength, obsolescent equipment, and rudimentary training, was incapable of immediate effective action of any sort against a formidable enemy. The two forces together constituted a useful and indeed essential foundation upon which, over a period of months, an army could be built. They offered, however, no means for rapid intervention in an overseas theatre of operations.

— Colonel Charles Perry Stacey

Following the suggestion of General Harry Crerar, on 19 November 1940, the military land forces of Canada were renamed as the Canadian Army through an Order in Council. PAM was reorganized as Canadian Army (Active), whereas NPAM became Canadian Army (Reserve).

== Legacy ==
The two Canadian Army components that were previously PAM and NPAM were renamed following World War II as Canadian Army Regular Force and Canadian Army Reserve Force respectively. However, in 1954, the Reserve Force was once again renamed Canadian Army (Militia) as a result of the Kennedy Report on the Reserve Army. Following the unification of the Canadian Armed Forces in 1968, the Canadian Army became Mobile Command, with its reserve component becoming Mobile Command (Reserve), while the military districts were renamed from Militia Groups to become Militia Districts, a designation retained until 1991.

In 1993, Mobile Command (Reserve) was renamed Land Force Command (Reserve), changing its name to match its Regular Force counterparts (also renamed Land Force Command). In 2011, the service elements of the Canadian Armed Forces reverted to their pre-1968 names, with Land Force Command (Reserve) reverting its name to the Canadian Army Reserve.

The term militia is still used colloquially in Canada in reference to the Canadian Army Reserve.

== See also ==
- History of the Canadian Army
- List of regiments of cavalry of the Canadian Militia (1900–1920)
- Military history of Canada
- Mi'kmaw militia
- Military history of Nova Scotia
- Provincial Marine
