= National Defence Act =

Canada's military legislation

Parliament of Canada
- Long title: An Act respecting national defence
- Citation: RSC, 1895, c. N-5
- Territorial extent: Provinces and Territories of Canada
- Passed: 1922
- Commenced: 1 January 1923
- Bill citation: C-27
- Status: Current legislation

The National Defence Act (NDA; French: Loi sur la défense nationale; LDN) is an Act of the Parliament of Canada, which is the primary enabling legislation for organizing and funding the military of Canada. The Act created the Department of National Defence, which merged the functions of the Department of Militia and Defence with the Department of the Naval Service and the Air Board, after its passage in 1922 and its implementation on 1 January 1923. At that time, and until the passage of the National Defence Act of 1950, the Canadian army was still governed by the UK's Army Act.

== History ==
On 4 November 1966, Bill C-243, The Canadian Forces Reorganization Act, was introduced to amend the National Defence Act. The aim of the bill was to reorganize the Canadian Army, the Royal Canadian Navy and the Royal Canadian Air Force, previously separate and independent services, under one umbrella. Following the debate in the House of Commons and further examination by the Defence Committee, the Bill was given a third and final reading in April 1967, clearing the way for unification. The Canadian Forces Reorganization Act came into effect on 1 February 1968, creating one organization responsible for the defence of Canada, the Canadian Forces, and amending the National Defence Act.

== The Act ==
The Act enables the Queen's Regulations and Orders for the Canadian Forces to govern the military of Canada. The Act establishes Non-Public Property (NPP) as a special class of Crown property to be used for the benefit of serving and former members of the Canadian Forces and their families. Most western nations have created similar regimes to support the morale and welfare needs of their militaries. On behalf of the Chief of the Defence Staff (CDS), the Director General Personnel and Family Support Services (DGPFSS) acts as the Managing Director for Non-Public Property and establishes the policies and provides functional oversight for the many NPP programs and activities delivered locally at bases and messes. Personnel and Family Support Services (PFSS) is responsible for administering NPP as well as for delivering selected public Morale and Welfare programs, services, and activities on behalf of the Chief of Military Personnel (CMP). The workforce delivering Non-Public Property programs and activities primarily consists of the Staff of the Non-Public Funds, Canadian Forces and members of the Canadian Forces. The Staff of the Non-Public Funds, Canadian Forces is a Separate Agency listed under Schedule 5 of the Financial Administration Act.
