= Minister of National Defence for Air (Canada) =

The Minister of National Defence for Air was the Canadian cabinet minister responsible for all matters related to military air services during World War II, notably the then-rapidly expanding Royal Canadian Air Force. The post was created by the 1940 War Measures Act, which specifically amended the National Defence Act of 1923. The Minister of National Defence for Air also served as President of the Air Council.

No separate department (ie: Department of National Defence for Air) was created, and the Minister of National Defence had overruling authority in any inter-service matters.

The post was merged into the current post of the Minister of National Defence in 1946.

== Ministers ==
- Charles Gavan Power 1940–1944
- Angus Lewis Macdonald 1944–1945 acting
- Colin William George Gibson 1945 acting
- Colin William George Gibson 1945–1946

From 12 July 1940, Power held a dual-appointment as Associate Minister of National Defence.

Both Macdonald and Power served with the Canadian Expeditionary Force in the army during World War I.

Gibson was Lieutenant Colonel of the Royal Hamilton Light Infantry and later Commandant of the Hamilton Garrison.

== See also ==
- Minister of Militia and Defence
- Minister of the Naval Service
- Minister of National Defence
- Minister of Aviation
- Minister of National Defence for Naval Services
- Minister of Overseas Military Forces
