= Minister of Militia and Defence =

Canadian minister position

Minister of Militia and Defence of Canada
- Department of Militia and Defence; Canadian Militia
- Style: The Honourable
- Member of: House of Commons; Privy Council; Cabinet
- Reports to: Parliament; Prime Minister
- Appointer: Monarch (represented by the governor general); on the advice of the prime minister
- Term length: At Her/His Majesty's pleasure
- Precursor: Minister of Militia and Defence of the Province of Canada
- Formation: 1 July 1867
- First holder: George-Étienne Cartier
- Final holder: George Perry Graham
- Abolished: 31 December 1922
- Superseded by: Minister of National Defence

The Minister of Militia and Defence was the federal government minister in charge of the volunteer army units in Canada, the Canadian Militia.

From 1855 to 1906, the minister was responsible for Canadian militia units only, as the British Army was still stationed in Canada. From 1906 to 1923, the minister was in charge of the Department of Militia and Defence (Canada). After 1923, the position was merged with the Minister of the Naval Service and the Minister of Aviation into the new position of Minister of National Defence. The Minister of National Defence became responsible for the Canadian Militia, the Royal Canadian Navy and, from 1924, the Royal Canadian Air Force.

== List of ministers ==
=== Pre-Confederation (1855–1867) ===
The following individuals were named the Minister of Militia and Defence for the Province of Canada.

Key:

Historical conservative parties: Parti bleu, Upper Canada Tories

No.	Portrait	Name	Term of office		Political party
1		Étienne-Paschal Taché	1855	1860	Parti bleu
2		John A. Macdonald	1860	1867	Tories

=== Post-Confederation (1867–1922) ===
The following individuals were named the Minister of Militia and Defence for Canada.

Key:

Liberal Party of Canada
Historical conservative parties: Liberal-Conservative, Conservative (historical), Unionist, National Liberal and Conservative

No.	Portrait	Name	Term of office		Political party	Ministry	Ref.
1		George-Étienne Cartier	1 July 1867	20 May 1873	Liberal-Conservative	1 (Macdonald)	
–		Hector-Louis Langevin (Acting)	21 May 1873	30 June 1873	Liberal-Conservative	1 (Macdonald)	
2		Hugh McDonald	1 July 1873	4 November 1873	Liberal-Conservative	1 (Macdonald)	
3		William Ross	7 November 1873	29 September 1874	Liberal	2 (Mackenzie)	
4		William Berrian Vail	30 September 1874	20 January 1878	Liberal	2 (Mackenzie)	
5		Alfred Gilpin Jones	21 January 1878	8 October 1878	Liberal	2 (Mackenzie)	
6		Louis-Rodrigue Masson	19 October 1878	15 January 1880	Conservative	3 (Macdonald)	
7		Alexander Campbell	16 January 1880	7 November 1880	Conservative	3 (Macdonald)	
8		Adolphe-Philippe Caron	8 November 1880	6 June 1891	Conservative	3 (Macdonald)	
8		Adolphe-Philippe Caron	16 June 1891	24 January 1892	Conservative	4 (Abbott)	
9		Mackenzie Bowell	25 January 1892	24 November 1892	Conservative	4 (Abbott)	
10		James Colebrooke Patterson	5 December 1892	12 December 1894	Conservative	5 (Thompson)	
10		James Colebrooke Patterson	21 December 1894	26 March 1895	Conservative	6 (Bowell)	
11		Arthur Rupert Dickey	26 March 1895	5 April 1896	Conservative	6 (Bowell)	
12		Mackenzie Bowell	6 January 1896	14 January 1896	Conservative	6 (Bowell)	
13		Alphonse Desjardins	15 January 1896	27 April 1896	Conservative	6 (Bowell)	
14		David Tisdale	1 May 1896	8 July 1896	Conservative	7 (Tupper)	
15		Frederick William Borden	13 July 1896	6 October 1911	Liberal	8 (Laurier)	
16		Sam Hughes	10 October 1911	12 October 1916	Conservative	9 (Borden)	
17		Albert Edward Kemp	23 November 1916	11 November 1917	Conservative	9 (Borden)	
18		Sydney Chilton Mewburn	12 October 1917	15 January 1920	Unionist	10 (Borden)	
–		James Alexander Calder (Acting)	16 January 1920	23 January 1920	Unionist	10 (Borden)	
19		Hugh Guthrie	24 January 1920	28 December 1921	Unionist	10 (Borden)	
19		Hugh Guthrie	24 January 1920	28 December 1921	National Liberal and Conservative	11 (Meighen)	
20		George Perry Graham	29 December 1921	31 December 1922	Liberal	12 (King)	
Office succeeded by the Minister of National Defence

=== Ministers with military experience ===
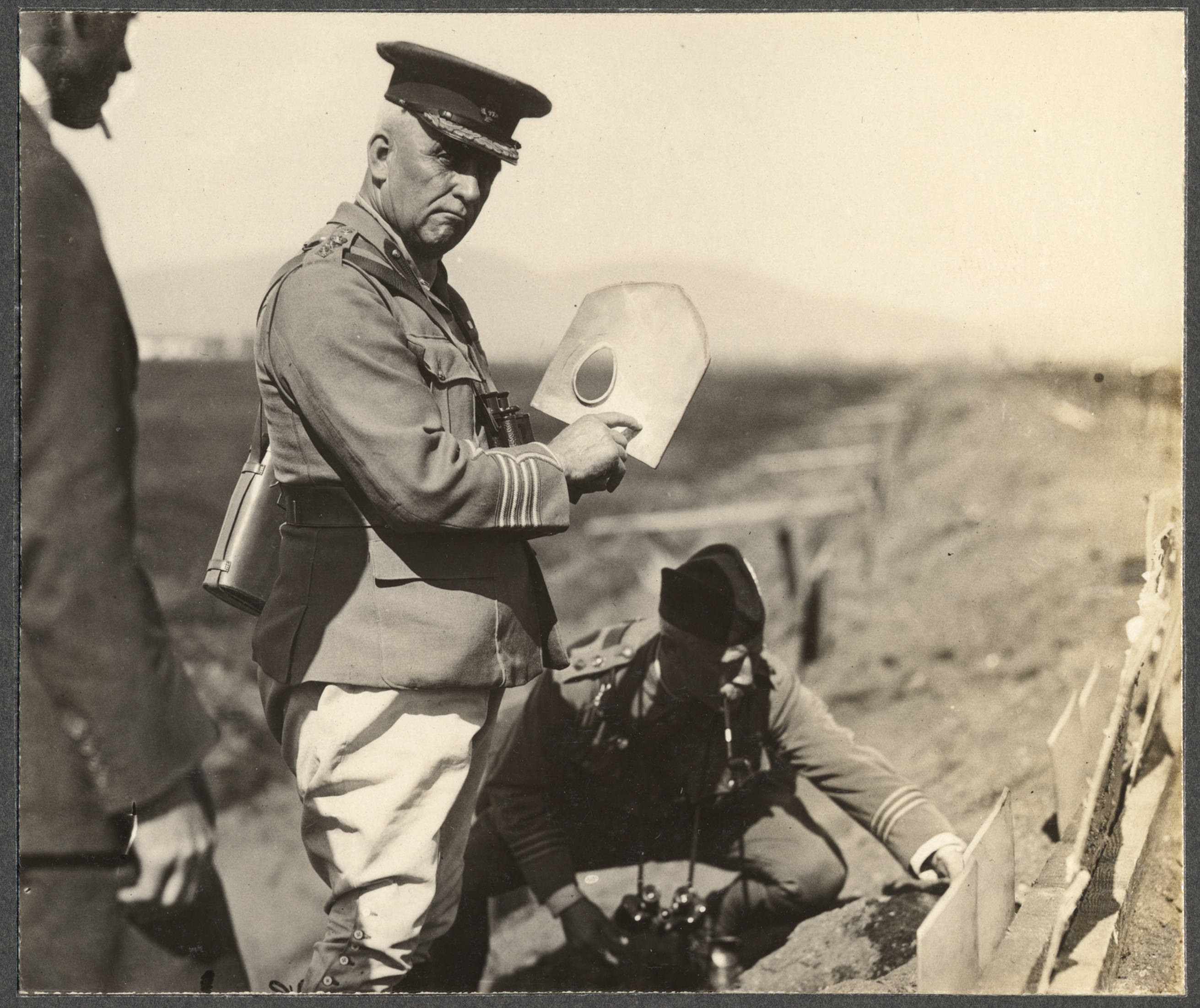
Sir Sam Hughes, dressed in the uniform of a colonel of the Canadian Militia, 1914.

Several individuals that served as the Minister of Militia and Defence have served with the Canadian Militia. They include:

- Private John Alexander Macdonald, Sedentary Militia during 1837 Rebellion
- Lieutenant Étienne-Paschal Taché, 5th Battalion of Select Embodied Militia, Chasseurs Canadiens Militia
- Lieutenant Colonel David Tisdale, 39th Norfolk Battalion of Infantry
- Assistant Surgeon Frederick William Borden, 68th (Kings) Battalion of Infantry, Non-Permanent Active Militia
- Colonel Sir Sam Hughes, 45th Canadian Volunteer Militia (45th West Durham Battalion of Infantry, later The Victoria and Haliburton Regiment and lastly as 45th Medium Battery, RCA) merged into what is 50th Field Artillery Regiment (The Prince of Wales Rangers), RCA) in 1960; Canadian volunteer to the British Army
- Major Sydney Chilton Mewburn, Commanding Officer of Royal Hamilton Light Infantry, Permanent Active Militia

== Deputy Minister of Militia and Defence ==
- Eugène Fiset 1906-1922

Fiset was a retired as Surgeon Colonel of Royal Canadian Regiment

== See also ==
- Minister of Aviation
- Minister of the Naval Service
- Minister of National Defence
- Minister of National Defence for Naval Services
- Minister of National Defence for Air
- Minister of Overseas Military Forces
