= Navy Exchange =

US Federal Navy retail stores

- Type: Federal agency
- Industry: Retail
- Founded: Brooklyn, New York City (1946)
- Headquarters: Virginia Beach, Virginia
- Number of locations: 300+
- Area served: Worldwide
- Key people: R. Adm. (Ret.) Robert J. Bianchi (CEO)
- Products: Discount department store, superstore
- Revenue: ▲$3.2 billion (2014)
- Owner: United States Navy
- Number of employees: 14,000
- Parent: Naval Supply Systems Command
- Website: mynavyexchange.com

Navy Exchange is a retail store chain owned and operated by the United States Navy under the Navy Exchange Service Command (NEXCOM), part of the Naval Supply Systems Command. The Navy Exchange offers goods and services to active military, retirees, and certain civilians on Navy installations in the United States, overseas Navy bases, and aboard Navy ships. The Navy Exchange is a type of base exchange, but is separate from the others (Army & Air Force Exchange Service (AAFES), Marine Corps Exchange, and Coast Guard Exchange).

== History ==
The beginnings of the Navy Exchange, referred to by Sailors as the "NEX," started in the 1800s, when enterprising citizens would greet a Navy ship coming into port by sailing out to meet it in what were called "bumboats." These merchants would sell goods to Sailors, often at inflated prices and reportedly shoddy quality.

In 1896, a "Canteen" was opened on USS Indiana, purportedly to help keep the Sailors' money on the ship, and to ensure that they were receiving a fair deal. The Naval Appropriations Act of March 3, 1909 established the first official stores and Commissaries on ships. This pressure on bumboat operators caused some to change tactics, and begin offering services, such as haircuts and shoe repair, to sailors. This led to a separate type of retail operation, a "ship services store," to be created aboard naval vessels. The two types of retail outlets were later combined to increase efficiency and save space.

As retail options on ships grew, so did their shore-side counterparts. In 1946, a committee, headed by Captain Wheelock H. Bingham, recommended that the shore-side retail operations be rolled into the same bureau as the ship-based retail locations. In 1946, these recommendations led to the creation of the Navy Ship's Store Office, the precursor to the modern Navy Exchange.

Today, the Navy Exchange operates much like many other major retailers, selling goods and clothing, as well as providing services such as barbering, floral arrangement, and laundry (depending on location). Most Navy Exchanges are located on military bases, though some lease private buildings, while others, called "Ship's Stores," operate on Navy vessels such as aircraft carriers.

NEXCOM, the Navy Exchange Service Command, operates multiple business lines, including Navy Exchange Retail Stores, Navy Lodge Hotels, Navy Gateway Inns & Suites hotels, the Navy Uniform Project Management Office (UPMO), Navy Clothing Textile and Research Facility (NCTRF), the Ship's Stores Program, and the Telecommunications Program Office (TPO).

On January 13 2017, the Department of Defense announced that all honorably discharged Veterans would be eligible to shop tax-free online Military Exchanges starting November 11, 2017. The expanded benefit is expected to make online Exchange privileges available to as many as 13 million Veterans. Six-months later, the Military Exchanges launched VetVerify.org, an online service where Veterans can verify their eligibility to shop online Exchanges, on June 5, 2017. It was concurrently announced that some Veterans who register would be selected to shop ahead of the November 11 launch as beta testers.
