= Department of Naval Services =

Department of Naval Services (Canada) was the department responsible for the naval services in Canada during the transition from the Royal Navy to the Royal Canadian Navy (RCN) from 1910 to 1923.

The department came into existence in May 1910 with the passage of the Naval Service Bill, which became the Naval Service Act. The Naval Service of Canada became the Royal Canadian Navy in 1911 and under the Minister of the Naval Service (Canada). The department was charged with the responsibility of the RCN.

On 1 January 1923, the National Defence Act came into effect and amalgamated the Department of Naval Services, the Department of Militia and Defence and the Air Board into the Department of National Defence (Canada).
