= Minister of National Defence for Naval Services (Canada) =

Minister responsible for the Royal Canadian Navy during World War II

Minister of National Defence for Naval Services (Canada) was the minister responsible for the Royal Canadian Navy during World War II. The post was merged into the current post of the Minister of National Defence (Canada). Prior to World War II, another ministerial post, Minister of the Naval Service existed from the creation of the Royal Canadian Navy in 1910 up to 1922 and preceded the Minister of National Defence.

== List of ministers ==
| Name | Years | Ministry |
|---|---|---|
| Angus Lewis Macdonald | 1940–1945 | Mackenzie King |
| Douglas Charles Abbott | 1945–1946 | Mackenzie King |

== Ministers with military experience ==
Macdonald served as a Lieutenant overseas with the 25th Battalion (Nova Scotia Rifles), CEF.

Abbott served overseas (at Vimy Ridge as Gunner) with the 7th (McGill) Siege Battery, Canadian Garrison Artillery, Royal Regiment of Canadian Artillery (1916-1918) and with the RAF briefly in 1918.

== See also ==
- Minister of Militia and Defence
- Minister of the Naval Service
- Minister of National Defence
- Minister of Aviation
- Minister of National Defence for Air
- Minister of Overseas Military Forces
