= Tom Shull =

American businessman

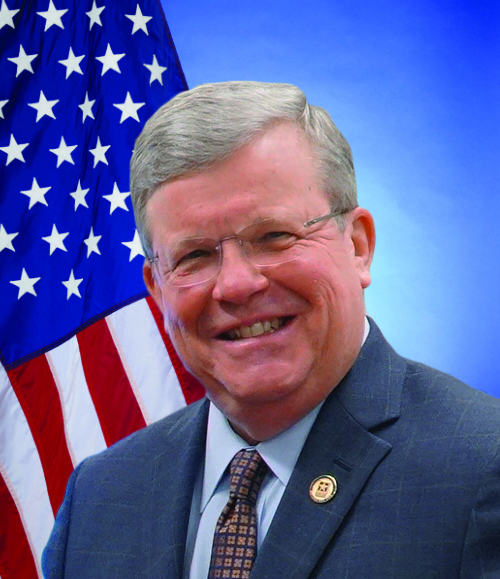
Tom Shull is the first civilian Director/CEO of the Army & Air Force Exchange Service.

Tom Shull is an American businessman and Director/CEO of the Army & Air Force Exchange Service (Exchange), No. 51 on the National Retail Federation's Top 100 Retailers list. Shull joined the Exchange in 2012 as the first civilian to lead the Department of Defense's largest retailer. He also serves on the Exchange's board of directors.

== Early life and education ==
Thomas Counter Shull was born at Fitzsimmons Army Hospital in Aurora, Colorado, while his father was on joint assignment at Peterson Air Force Base. His father served for 30 years in the United States Army and spent more than 40 months in combat. Shull is a graduate of Heidelberg High School in Heidelberg, Germany. He earned a Bachelor of Science from the United States Military Academy in West Point, N.Y., where he was among the top 1% in leadership. Shull's military schooling included Ranger and Airborne Schools. He holds a master of business administration from Harvard Business School, where he graduated with honors.

== Military service ==
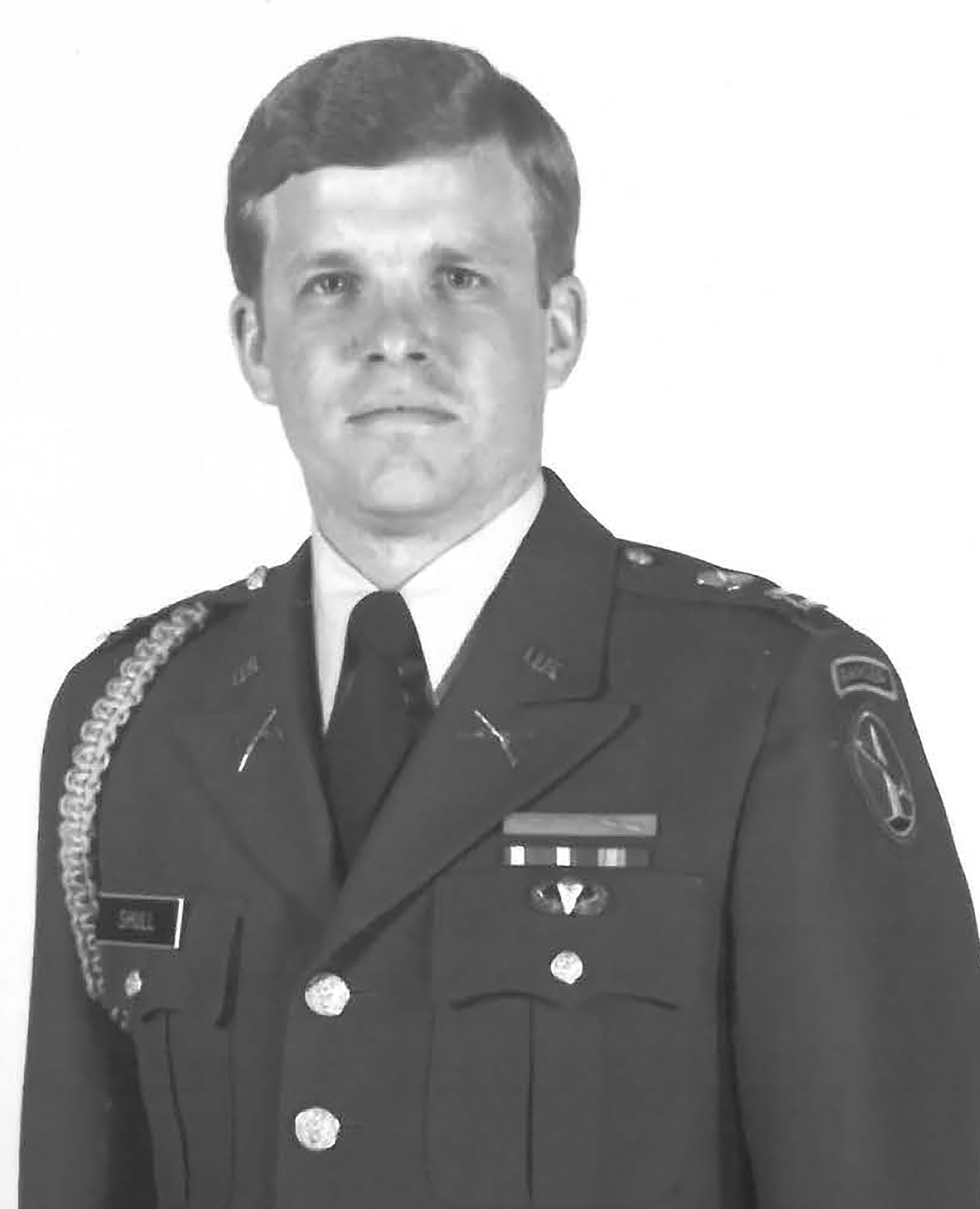
After graduating from the U.S. Military Academy, Shull served in the U.S. Army from 1973 to 1985.

During his time in the Army, Shull served as Rifle Platoon Leader, Scout Platoon Leader, Support Platoon Leader, Company Executive Officer and Infantry Company Commander. He had numerous line and staff assignments, including serving as assistant professor at the U.S. Military Academy and commander of a Mechanized Infantry Company. Shull's company was ranked No. 1 in combat readiness out of more than 30 others in the 4th Infantry Division. Shull earned several honors, including the Meritorious Service Medal, Expert Infantryman's Badge, Ranger Tab and Airborne Wings.

In 1981, Shull was named to the 17th class of White House Fellows and served in the Office of the Chief of Staff. During his last active-duty assignment, then-Major Shull served as Military Assistant to Robert "Bud" McFarlane, Assistant to the President for National Security Affairs. During his time at the White House, Shull led a major re-evaluation and revision of White House management systems. He also conducted a comprehensive review of the National Security Council, was a Term Member of the Council on Foreign Relations and helped coordinate National Security Council low-intensity conflict policy initiatives. Shull represented the White House in helping to oversee the construction and dedication of the Vietnam Veterans Memorial. He earned the Defense Superior Service Medal.

== Business career ==
Shull began his retail career in 1985 at Sanger-Harris, formed by Federated Department Stores, in Dallas, Texas, where he led business planning, training and recruiting. He served as Divisional Merchandise Manager of $20 million hard goods businesses for the prominent regional 22-store chain.

From 1986 to 1990, Shull served as senior consultant at McKinsey & Co., where he directed defense/aerospace and retail client engagements to reduce costs and increase market share.

In 1990, Shull co-founded Meridian Ventures and served as CEO until 2012. He served clients including Federated Department Stores, Louis Vuitton Moet Hennessy, Mobil Corp., Tecstar Corp. and Spiegel Brands as senior adviser and assumed senior executive roles to identify acquisitions, raise equity capital and implement turnarounds.

From 1992 to 1994, Shull served at Macy's. He was a key leader in creating $2 billion of value in two years as a senior vice president of strategic planning, group senior vice president and then executive vice president. He developed a restructuring plan and served as principal negotiator in Macy's exit from bankruptcy.

Shull joined Barneys New York in 1997. He was Barneys' first non-family member CEO and led the company out of bankruptcy. Under his leadership, Barneys realized earnings improvements of 6 percentage points in 20 months.

From 2000 to 2004, Shull served as president and chief executive of Hanover Direct. At Hanover, profitability improved by more than $45 million on a $460 million sales base as he repositioned the company's e-commerce business and increased sales from $20 million to more than $125 million. Shull led efforts to save brands such as The Company Store, Gump's and Improvements.

In 2004, Shull joined Wise Foods as chairman and chief executive officer. He increased earnings by 10 percentage points and positioned the company for sale after a successful turnaround. He served until 2008.

Shull was elected to the Zale Corporation board of directors from 2004 to 2010, serving on the compensation committee and as chairman of the audit committee for three years. As audit committee chair, he successfully resolved two SEC investigations and led improvements in governance and accounting practices through early adoption of Sarbanes-Oxley requirements.

In 2009, the U.S. Bankruptcy Court for the Southern District of New York named Shull the chief restructuring officer of Fred Leighton Jewelers.

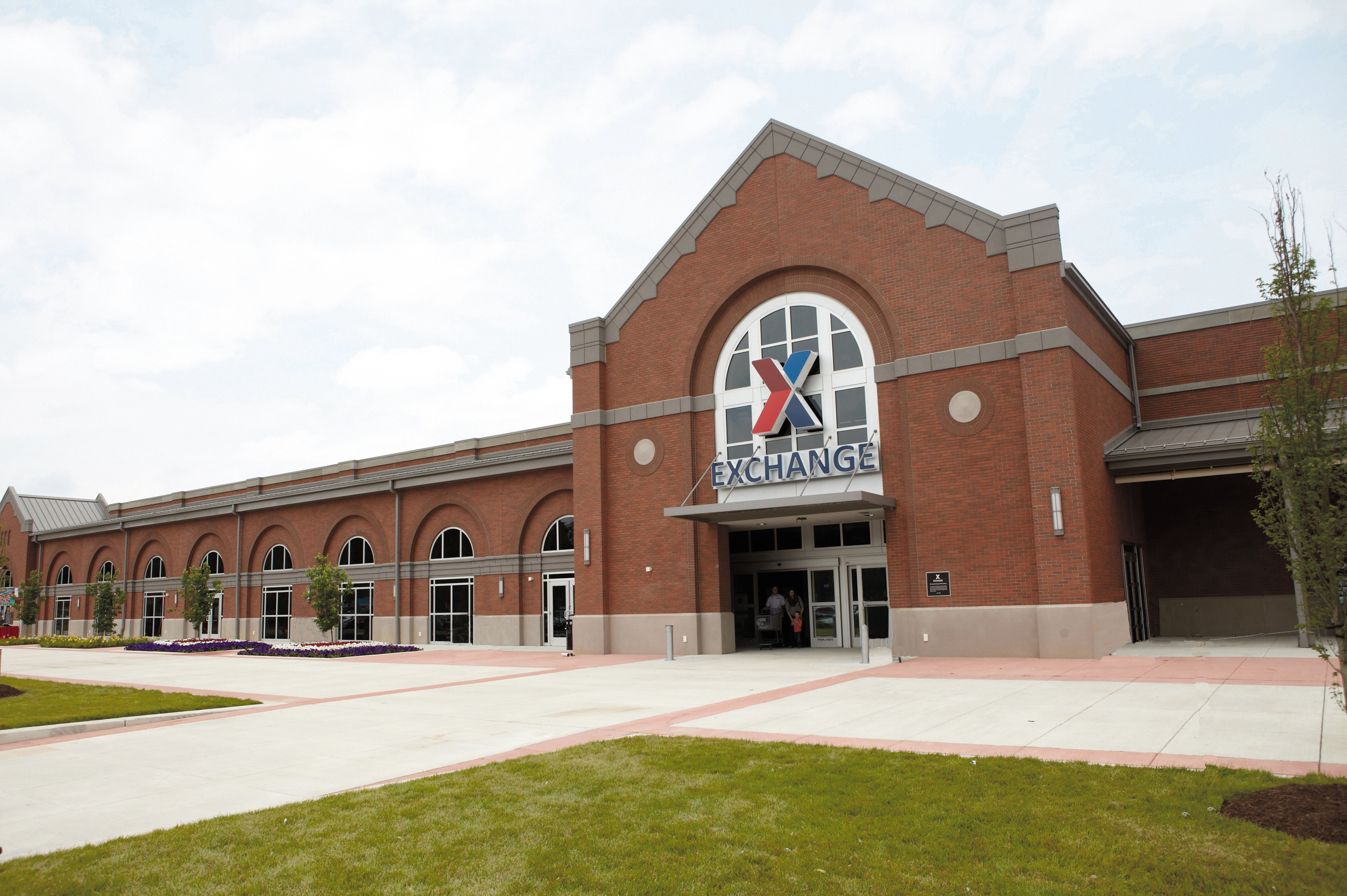
The Exchange is responsible for 5,500 facilities in more than 30 countries, 50 states, four U.S. territories (Guam, Puerto Rico, Northern Mariana Islands and American Samoa) and the District of Columbia.

In 2012, Shull was named the Director/CEO of the Army & Air Force Exchange Service, becoming the first civilian to lead the Department of Defense retailer. Shull's business acumen and personal interest in taking care of military families have led to the strengthening the Exchange for service members and their families. Shull has applied private-sector best practices to the Exchange while focusing on growth initiatives such as intensifying national brands, growing concessions and convenience stores, and transforming the online experience. In 2016, Shull became the longest-serving leader of the Exchange.

The Exchange is a nonappropriated fund entity of the Department of Defense operating more than 5,500 retail facilities nationwide and in more than 30 countries and four U.S. territories. Like commercial retailers, the Exchange is reliant on the sale of products and services to fund its operations and generate a profit. In 2024, the Exchange achieved operating earnings of $492 million, with $295 million of those earnings reinvested into military quality-of-life programs.

In the last 10 years, the Exchange benefit has provided $15 billion in value to the military community, including through contributions to military Quality-of-Life programs that promote military readiness and resiliency. Each year, the Exchange distributes approximately 60% of its earnings to these programs.

Under Shull's leadership, the Exchange has more closely aligned itself with private-sector competitors by tightening cost controls, reducing operational costs and introducing top brands such as Bass Pro Shops, The Home Depot, Gap and Old Navy. The Exchange has also improved its e-commerce operation at ShopMyExchange.com, establishing shipping centers inside brick-and-mortar stores to reduce shipping costs and increase delivery speeds.

Starting in 2020, Shull navigated the Exchange through the COVID-19 pandemic, which forced many retailers to close. As mission-critical partners to military operations, Exchange stores remained open and continued to serve the military community. Under Shull, the Exchange focused on conserving cash, reducing inventory and limiting general and administrative expenses, allowing it to weather the pandemic and emerged in a strong financial position—without any layoffs or furloughs.

Shull is a former member of the Board of Trustees of the Association of Graduates of the United States Military Academy at West Point. He also helped lead the first major Capital Campaign in USMA history. Shull is former chairman and member of the Board of Directors, Deafness Research Foundation, the largest private charity for funding research in the causes and treatment of hearing loss.

In 2021, Shull was a recipient of the West Point Association of Graduates' Distinguished Graduate Award. Senator Jim Inhofe, former Senate Armed Services Committee Chair, remarked, "Tom is a perfect recipient of the Distinguished Graduate Award due to his selfless service to our nation and his unwavering dedication to service members and their families."

== Veterans advocacy ==
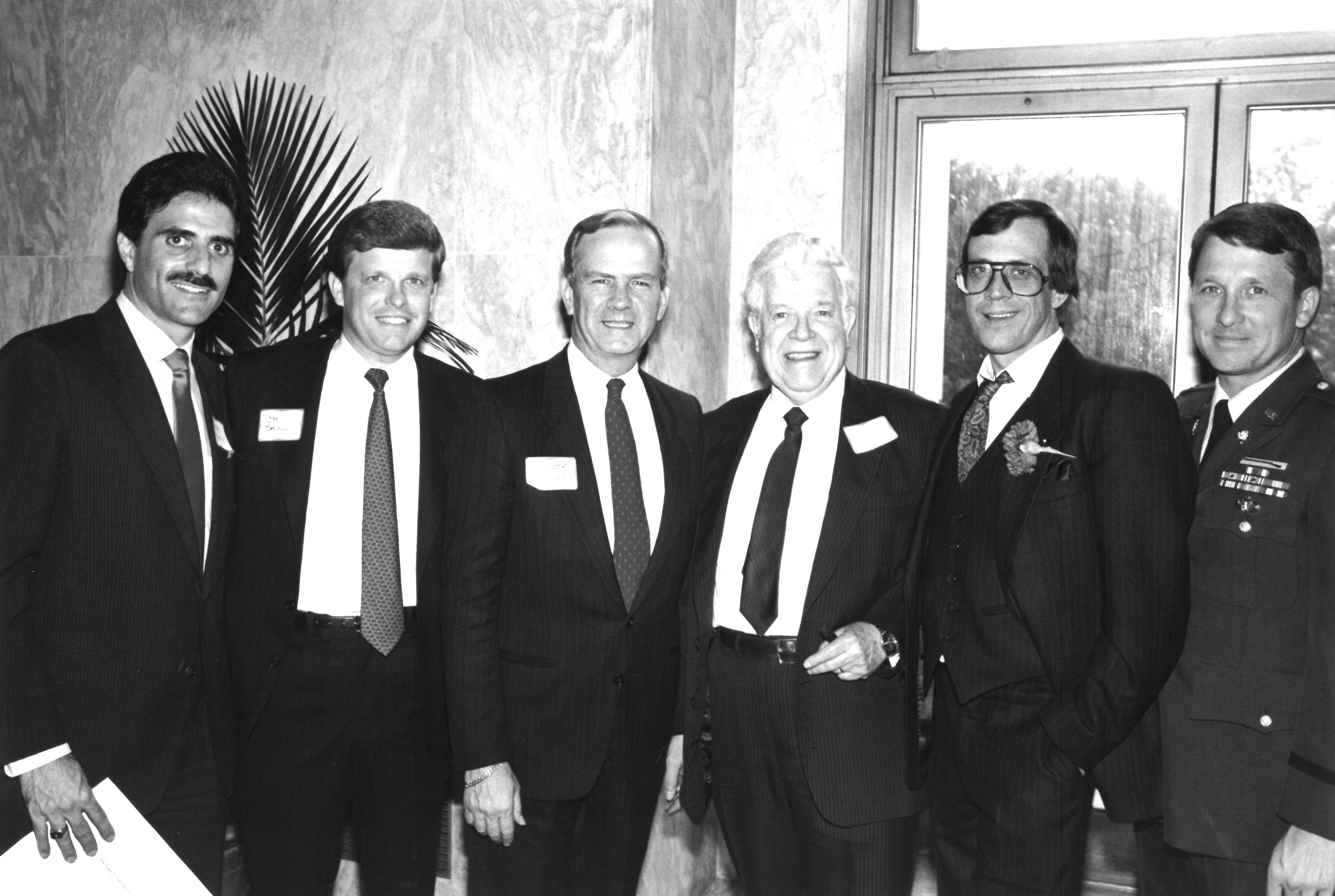
Tom Shull (second from left) with (left to right) Michael Zacharia, Ambassador Robert "Bud" McFarlane, Lewis Shull, "To Heal a Nation" author Jan Scruggs and LTC John Shull.

Shull is a lifelong advocate for veterans' issues. While serving as a White House Fellow assigned to the White House, Shull was chosen to be an intermediary during the creation of the Vietnam Veterans Memorial, helping to ensure compromises were reached to facilitate the construction and dedication of the memorial. In a Harvard Business School Bulletin article "Making Peace," Jack Wheeler (a driving force in getting the Memorial built on the National Mall) said, "There would have been no memorial without Tom Shull. Period."

Once Shull came to the Exchange, he began planning for a way to recognize and honor all honorably discharged veterans for their service. In a 2014 memo to the Undersecretary of Defense, Shull proposed allowing all honorably discharged veterans to shop the exchanges online as a modest recognition of their service, especially since the vast majority of veterans who served honorably do not meet the 20-year criteria or certified disabled status required by the United States Department of Veterans Affairs to retain exchange benefits. The Veterans online shopping benefit represents a low-risk, low-cost opportunity to strengthen funding of Quality-of-Life programs in support of service members and their families.

On Jan. 11, 2017, after years of coordination with the Exchange, Departments of Defense, Army and Air Force as well as several other federal agencies, Shull received word that a change to DoD policy would extend limited online exchange privileges to all honorably discharged veterans starting Nov. 11, 2017—Veterans Day. Congressional oversight committees were notified as well and had 30 days to comment. No comments were provided, and the Veterans online shopping benefit—the first new benefit for Veterans since 1953—began on Veterans Day 2017.

The Veterans online shopping benefit allows approximately 18 million veterans to shop online at military exchanges.

On Jan. 1, 2020, Exchange in-store shopping privileges were extended to disabled Veterans, Purple Heart recipients and certain caregivers—4.1 million Americans.

Before the expansion, only Veterans with 100% service-connected disabilities could shop in person. (Active-duty service members, their dependents and military retirees also have in-store and online privileges.)

Beginning May 1, 2021, after a change in Department of Defense policy, the Exchange expanded shopping privileges to 575,000 DoD and Coast Guard civilian employees and retirees.

== Awards and decorations ==
Shull's awards and decorations include:

- Presidential Service Badge
- Meritorious Service Medal
- Expert Infantryman's Badge
- Ranger Tab
- Airborne Wings
- Defense Superior Service Medal.
- Reserve Officer's Association's Minuteman Hall of Fame
- American Logistics Association Distinguished Service Award
- Department of Defense Distinguished Service Award from the National Defense Transportation Association (NDTA)
- 2021 West Point Association of Graduates' Distinguished Graduate Award

== Personal life ==
Shull and his wife, Dorothy, have three children. Shull is a former Elder in the Presbyterian Church.
