= Non-public property =

Canadian military term

In Canada, non-public property (NPP) (French: Biens non publics; BNP) is created by the National Defence Act (NDA) and includes all money and property received for or administered by or through NPP organizations, and all money and property contributed to or by Canadian Forces members for their collective benefit and welfare. The chief of the Defence Staff (CDS) has overall responsibility under the NDA for NPP. The CEO of the Canadian Forces Morale and Welfare Services (CFMWS) organization reports to the chief of military personnel (CMP) for the administration of NPP. The chain of command for NPP is the CDS through the CMP and the CFPFSS to officers in command of bases, wings and units.

Effectively, this means that all property held in trust by the Canadian military, though covered by what may be deemed as "public" funds, is "non-public property", and is under the full administrations and protections of the CMP.
