= Army & Air Force Exchange Service =

American military retail exchange service

- Type: Department store, Government agency
- Industry: Retail
- Founded: 25 July 1895 (General Orders No. 46); 6 June 1941 (Army Exchange Service)
- Headquarters: 3911 South Walton Walker Boulevard, Dallas, Texas, United States 75236
- Number of locations: 5,500 (all facilities)
- Key people: Brad Bingham, Director/CEO
- Revenue: ▲US$8.6 billion (2025) US$8.5 billion (2024); ▲US$8.5 billion (2023)
- Number of employees: 25,700
- Parent: Department of Defense (1947–present)
- Website: www.shopmyexchange.com

The Army & Air Force Exchange Service (AAFES, also referred to as The Exchange and post exchange/PX or base exchange/BX) provides goods and services at U.S. Army, Air Force, and Space Force installations worldwide, operating department stores, convenience stores, restaurants, military clothing stores, theaters and more nationwide and in more than 30 countries and four U.S. territories. The Exchange is headquartered in Dallas, Texas, and its director/chief executive officer is Brad Bingham. The largest of the United States Department of Defense's exchange services, it is No. 51 on the National Retail Federation's Top 100 Retailers list.

In addition to their retail support for US military personnel, the Exchange outfits troops with combat uniforms at-cost, and serves approximately 3.4 million school lunches per year for children attending Department of Defense Dependents Schools overseas.

As of Veterans Day, 11 November 2017, military exchanges started offering online exchange shopping privileges to an estimated 18 million honorably discharged veterans. Disabled veterans, Purple Heart recipients and certain caregivers were given in-store shopping privileges in 2020. DoD and Coast Guard employees can shop in stores and online as of 1 May 2021.

== History ==
=== Roots ===
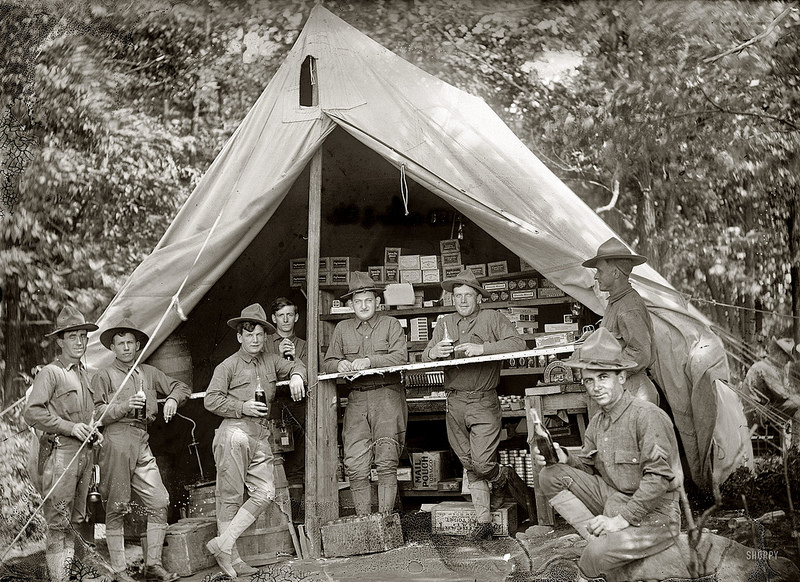
Soldiers take a break at a post exchange in this 1914 photo.

For more than 100 years before the post exchange system was created, traveling merchants known as sutlers provided American soldiers with goods and services during times of war. Sutlers served troops at Army camps as far back as the French and Indian and Revolutionary wars.

Complaints of sutlers charging premiums for substandard merchandise were widespread during the Civil War, and in 1867, the War Department created the post trader system. While intended to prevent the unscrupulous practices of sutlers, the post trader system still subjected troops to over-inflated prices and was rife with bribery and corruption.

On 29 November 1880, Col. Henry A. Morrow, seeking to quell disciplinary problems resulting from troops visiting disreputable places of amusement in nearby towns, established the first American military canteen at Vancouver Barracks. There, troops were provided newspapers and magazines, played billiards and cards, and could obtain light food and drink without leaving post.

The idea was so successful that other posts began establishing canteens across the frontier, providing troops with not only a place to socialize but obtain daily necessities at affordable prices. In 1889, the War Department issued General Orders No. 10, authorizing commanding generals to establish canteens at army posts. Like the modern-day exchange system, these canteens were largely financially self-sustaining.

In February 1892, the secretary of war ordered that canteens be henceforth referred to as "post exchanges." This change was due to the popular association of the word "canteen" with the bawdy, immoral behavior alleged to occur in the canteens of foreign armies. By 1895, post traders had been almost entirely replaced on Army posts by post exchanges.

=== Early developments ===
On 25 July 1895, the War Department issued General Orders No. 46, directing commanders at every post to establish a post exchange "wherever practicable." Post exchanges served two missions: first, "to supply the troops at reasonable prices with the articles of ordinary use, wear, and consumption, not supplied by the Government, and to afford them a means of rational recreation and amusement," and second, "provide the means for improving the masses" through exchange profits.

For the first 45 years of the exchange system, exchanges operated independently under the direction of each post's commanding officer, meaning there was little uniformity between exchange locations. While the War Department did not centrally control exchange operations, it did hold commanding officers accountable for their financial assets. Exchanges were also subject to annual checks by the Inspector General's office.

With the outbreak of World War I and subsequent expansion of the U.S. Army, it became clear that the existing post exchange system was not equipped to accommodate such a large-scale effort. Gen. John J. Pershing enlisted the help of civilian service organizations to provide canteen service overseas, though they proved to lack the equipment and experience necessary to fully meet the needs of downrange troops.

=== Centralization ===
During the mobilization efforts leading up to World War II, the War Department increasingly looked for ways to upgrade its antiquated post exchange system. After completing a review of existing exchanges, Lt. Col. J. Edwin Grose concluded that the Army would need to "become the operator of an extensive chain store system with world wide [sic] branches" to sufficiently meet the demands of a large-scale war effort. In April 1941, an advisory committee of five prominent retail executives affirmed this notion, recommending the creation of a central organization to oversee exchange operations.

On 6 June 1941, the Army Exchange Service (AES) was created. On 26 July 1948, AES was renamed the Army & Air Force Exchange Service (AAFES), continuing its service to the Air Force, which became a separate service branch the previous September.

Since its establishment, the Exchange has been involved in 14 major military operations (to include World War II, Korea, Vietnam, Grenada, Panama, the Balkans, and Operations Enduring and Iraqi Freedom) as well as several dozen humanitarian and disaster relief contingencies.

== Structure and funding ==
Part of the Department of Defense, the Exchange is directed by a board of directors responsible to the secretaries of the Army and Air Force through the Chiefs of Staff. As a non-appropriated fund activity, the Exchange is self-sustaining through the sale of goods and services.

Members of the Exchange's 13-member board of directors include Lt. Gen. Caroline M. Miller, Deputy Chief of Staff for Manpower, Personnel and Services of the U.S. Air Force; Sergeant Major of the Army Michael Weimer and Chief Master Sergeant of the Space Force John F. Bentivegna.

== Earnings ==
100% of Exchange earnings support the US military community. In the last 10 years, the Exchange has generated $2.4 billion in dividends to Quality-of-Life programs, including through contributions to critical military Quality-of-Life programs, outfitting more than 690,000 uniforms at cost annually, providing school meal support for Department of Defense Education Activity facilities overseas and delivering needed services to locations impacted by natural disasters.

The Exchange is nearly self-funded, funding the majority of its operations budget through customer revenues.

== Stores ==
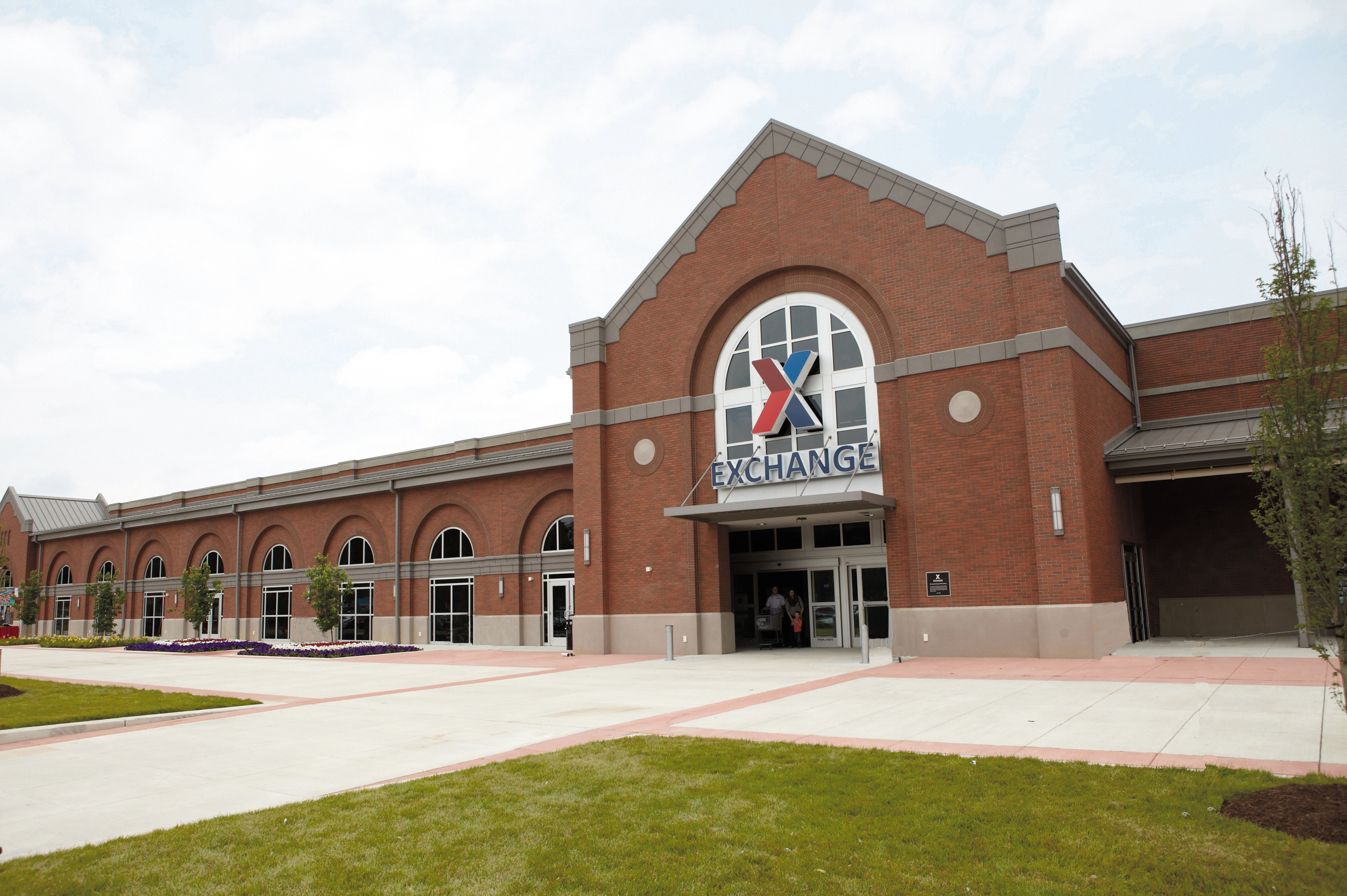
The Army & Air Force Exchange Service's Main Store on Fort Belvoir, VA.

The Exchange operates more than 5,500 facilities, including main stores, convenience stores, military clothing stores and theaters, nationwide and in more than 30 countries and four U.S. territories.

Modern base and post exchanges (called BX in the Air Force and Space Force, PX in the Army) provide tax-free goods – including name brands such as Sunglass Hut, Old Navy, Gap, Aerie and American Eagle – to authorized shoppers. In 2023, the Exchange partnered with The Home Depot to make tax-free appliances available on ShopMyExchange.com and physical showrooms in select stores. In May 2025, the merchandise assortment from The Home Depot was expanded to include power tool sets, outdoor power equipment, grills, garden tools, ceiling fans and more. In 2024, an agreement was announced to make Bass Pro Shops the official outdoor gear provider for the Exchange. Many Exchanges also host concession malls with a variety of vendors and storefronts.

Additionally, the Exchange has more than 1,700 restaurants such as Subway, Qdoba, Panera, Panda Express, Burger King, Freshens, Popeyes, Taco Bell, Pizza Hut, Charleys Philly Steaks and Starbucks as well as over 3,400 concession operations. While shopping at Exchange stores is limited to authorized patrons, anyone can dine at Exchange restaurants.

All Exchange restaurants offer better-for-you menu items, part of the Exchange's BE FIT 360 initiative devoted to holistic health. The program also encompasses fitness apparel and gear and on-installation wellness services such as optometry, dental, chiropractic and more.

== Authorized shoppers ==
Authorized patrons of the Exchange include members of Active Duty, members of the Reserves and National Guard, retired members of the U.S. uniformed services, recipients of the Medal of Honor and Purple Heart, disabled veterans and certain caregivers, honorably discharged veterans (online only), DoD and Coast Guard civilians and others.

== Employees ==
The Exchange employs approximately 24,000 associates worldwide in the United States, Europe, the Pacific and the Middle East. About 45% of the Exchange's U.S. workforce is veterans and military spouses. The Exchange was named the No. 1 Military Friendly Spouse Employer in 2023 and 2024 and has been named a Military Friendly Employer by Viqtory Media, publisher of G.I. Jobs and Military Spouse magazine, for 16 consecutive years, receiving the publisher's Gold Award for 2024. The Exchange has made U.S. Veterans Magazine's "Best of the Best" list eight years running, as well.

Since 2013, the Exchange has hired more than 67,000 veterans and military spouses. The organization has also hired nearly 2,300 Wounded Warriors since 2010. In all, about 80% of the Exchange's associates are related to a service member.

The Exchange offers Veterans and military spouses competitive pay and benefits, including the associate transfer program, which helps military spouses continue their Exchange career as they move from duty station to duty station.

Nearly 5,000 Exchange associates have deployed to combat zones in Iraq and Afghanistan to support troops in combat operations since 9/11. The Exchange currently operates more than 300 facilities in contingency zones in countries such as Kuwait, Iraq, Saudi Arabia, Jordan, Qatar, United Arab Emirates, Romania, Cyprus, Bosnia and Kosovo.

== Civilian leadership ==
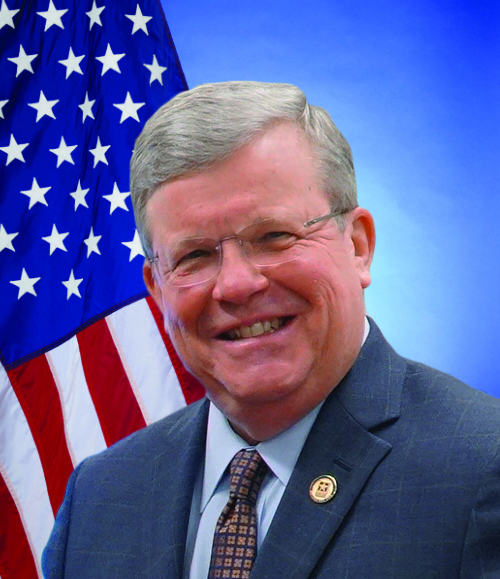
Tom Shull, Director & CEO of AAFES since 2012

In 2012, Tom Shull became the Exchange's first civilian director/CEO, having previously served as an executive with Wise Foods, Hanover Direct, Barneys New York and Meridian Ventures. A West Point graduate, Shull served as an infantry company commander and held assignments at the White House and National Security Council. Historically, the Exchange had been run by a two-star general with experience in supply and logistics.

In his tenure, Shull has emphasized merchandising national brands, expanding Express convenience stores, strengthening the Exchange's online presence and reducing costs to increase earnings and the dividend paid to military quality-of-life programs from those earnings.

Shull also shaped the Exchange's efforts to bring more first-run movies to military movie theaters, building partnerships with major movie studios.

In 2026, Brad Bingham became the Exchange's new civilian director/CEO following Tom Shull's retirement. Bingham now serves on the Exchange's Board of Directors and its Executive Committee.

== Veteran support ==
=== Veterans online shopping benefit ===
On 8 May 2014, Shull drafted a memorandum to the Under Secretary of Defense for Personnel and Readiness proposing that military exchanges be allowed to extend online shopping privileges to honorably discharged veterans.

Shull presented the business case for the veterans online shopping benefit to the Department of Defense's Executive Resale Board in August 2014. The Executive Resale Board voted unanimously to recommend the proposal in August 2016.

On 13 January 2017, the Department of Defense announced that all honorably discharged veterans would be eligible to shop tax-free online military exchanges starting 11 November 2017. The expanded benefit made online exchange privileges available to an estimated 18 million veterans.

=== Expanded in-store shopping privileges ===
On 1 January 2020, the Exchange began to grant disabled veterans, Purple Heart recipients and certain caregivers — 4.1 million Americans — in-store shopping privileges.

Privileges expanded to all veterans with service-connected disabilities, veterans who are Purple Heart recipients, veterans who are former prisoners of war and primary family caregivers for veterans who are enrolled in the Department of Veterans Affairs Program of Comprehensive Assistance for Family Caregivers.

This new privilege was specified in the Purple Heart and Disabled Veterans Equal Access Act of 2018, included in the John S. McCain National Defense Authorization Act for Fiscal Year 2019. The Department of Defense announced the expansion 13 November 2019.

The new patron group also has access to commissaries and morale, welfare and recreation retail facilities located on U.S. military installations.

Beginning 1 May 2021, Department of Defense and Coast Guard civilians in the continental U.S. became eligible to shop at military exchanges, and online benefits were added in October 2021. Opening exchange access to DoD and Coast Guard civilian employees working on installations improves dividends to Quality-of-Life programs, leverages the military exchanges' buying power and strengthens the Exchange benefit for Soldiers, Airmen and Guardians.

== Disaster support ==
Following the 9/11 terrorist attacks, the Exchange deployed 53-foot convenience stores on wheels, dubbed mobile field Exchanges (MFEs) to serve first responders at the Pentagon, World Trade Center and around New York City.

The Exchange has a history of supporting the military responding to natural disasters. During the 2017 hurricane season, the Exchange sent support to areas affected by Hurricanes Harvey, Irma and Maria. Support included an MFE, requested by the Texas State Guard to allow National Guard members to stock up on water, batteries, beef jerky, shampoo, sports drinks and more. A second MFE opened days later in Corpus Christi, Texas.

The Exchange sent shipments of bottled water and emergency supplies such as generators, batteries, flashlights, tarps, gas cans and first-aid kits to Florida, Georgia and Puerto Rico ahead of Hurricane Irma and Hurricane Maria.

The Exchange also supported service members in the wake of Hurricane Florence and Hurricane Michael in 2018, shipping thousands of packages of batteries, thousands of cases of water, generators, gas cans and flashlights were delivered to military installations in the path of the storms. Hurricane Dorian and Typhoon Ling ling in 2019, earthquakes in Puerto Rico and Hurricane Laura in 2020 and Tropical Storm Ida in 2021 are among other instances where the Exchange provided support to those affected. The Exchange provided vital support to service members affected by Hurricane Helene at Fort Gordon and Moody Air Force Base and Hurricane Milton at MacDill Air Force Base and Patrick Space Force Base in 2024. Support included deployment of an MFE with snacks, beverages, hygiene items and more, along with gasoline shipments and electrical generator support to facilities without power or fuel supplies.

During the COVID-19 pandemic, the Exchange served thousands of troops who were in required quarantine after travel. The Exchange implemented a personal shopper program with contactless delivery at several military bases that allowed quarantined service members to order basic hygiene items, snacks and more. MFEs were also deployed to field hospitals established by the U.S. military to provide pandemic support, including the Javits Center in New York City, New York.

The Exchange has 13 MFEs and two mobile barber shops that can be deployed as needed to disaster-affected areas.

== Military Star card ==
The Exchange also operates and funds the Exchange Credit Program (ECP), a program established by Congress in 1979 to protect service members from predatory lending. A September 2024 report by Bankrate showed the Star Card having the second-lowest interest rate among retail-branded credit cards, behind Amazon's Secured Card, which requires a deposit. The Military Star card's APR is a flat rate for all cardholders.

In July 2024, ECP announced a collaboration with Discover Global Network to improve the Military Star card's security features and expand acceptance on military installations. The updated cards were issued throughout late 2024 and include EMV chip technology, tap-to-pay and mobile wallet capabilities and acceptance at on-installation merchants including concessionaires, restaurants, food delivery, third-party vendors and certain Morale, Welfare and Recreation activities.

== See also ==
- Base exchange
- Canex, Canadian equivalent
- NAAFI, United Kingdom equivalent
- Navy Exchange
