= Minister of Overseas Military Forces =

Canadian ministry during WWI (1916–20)

The Minister of Overseas Military Forces was established in November 1916 to administer Canadian forces in the United Kingdom during World War I, and abolished in 1920. The position was largely to act as the communications channel between the Department of Militia and Defence, the British War Office, and the Canadian Corps.

== Formation ==
When the Canadian Expeditionary Force went overseas in 1914, no provision had been made for its administration. Numerous individuals including Minister of Militia and Defence Sam Hughes, acting High Commission of Canada in the United Kingdom George Perley, and Max Aitken, Canadian military representative at the front were involved in Canadian Expeditionary Force affairs. To end confusion, Prime Minister Robert Borden planned to reorganize the Militia Department and establish a military council in England headed by a new ministry. Hughes while overseas in England responded by establishing an Acting Sub-Militia Council which would provide him greater latitude outside of parliamentary overview. Borden expressly told Hughes to detail his intended changes so they could be first reviewed and agreed to before being formalized in an Order in Council. Instead, Borden learned of the creation of the Acting Sub-Militia Council via the press and in response Borden recalled Hughes back to Canada. The council presided by Major-General John Wallace Carson, to which Hughes appointed his own son-in-law as secretary, began meeting weekly and formulating changes in policy.

Criticism from Field Marshal Douglas Haig, King George V and from within his own party gradually forced Borden to tighten control over Hughes. Hughes vigorously opposed the creation of the new ministry and when it became clear the new ministry would be created Hughes sought to have Max Aitken appointed to the new post instead of Perley. Borden stayed the course and Order in Council P.C. 2651 of 1916 created the Minister of Overseas Military Forces position on 28 October 1916. Borden subsequently appointed Perley as Minister of Overseas Military Forces on 31 October 1916. Hughes after refusing to compromise subsequently berated Borden in a letter, after which point Hughes was forced to resign his ministerial post. With the resignation of Hughes, the Acting Sub-Militia Council lost its source of authourty, and less than a week into Perley's term as minister the council members submitted their resignation which were accepted.

Albert Edward Kemp succeeded Perley in October 1917. With the end of conflict in Europe, the repatriation of the Canadian Expeditionary Force the final settlement of financial arrangements with the British government, the office was abolished on 8 June 1920 via Order of Council P.C. 1705 of 1920.

== Role and organization ==
The Overseas Minister conducted all negotiations between the Canadian and British Governments concerning Canada's overseas forces and was assisted by an advisory council. The office of the new headquarters (including the General Staff, Adjutant General and Quartermaster General) was established in London at Argyll House, in Regent Street. The Adjutant General Branch was divided in four principal duties : Organization, Establishments, Mobilization and Demobilization; Supply of Military Personnel for the maintenance of the Forces in the field; Casualties and Invaliding; Personal Services, Discipline, Personal questions regarding Officers and Other Ranks, Records, Issuing and editing of Adjutant General's Orders, etc. The Medical, Dental, Chaplain and Record Services came under the Adjutant General's Department for general administration.

== Ministers ==
1.	Sir George Halsey Perley	31 October 1916 – 11 October 1917	under Prime Minister Robert Borden
2.	Sir Albert Edward Kemp	12 October 1917 – 8 June 1920	under Prime Minister Robert Borden

== See also ==
- Minister of Militia and Defence
- Minister of the Naval Service
- Minister of National Defence
- Minister of Aviation
- Minister of National Defence for Air
- Minister of National Defence for Naval Services

== Bibliography ==
- Hughes, S. H. S. (2000). Steering the course : a memoir. Montreal Que: McGill-Queen's University Press. ISBN 0773520422.
- Love, David W (1999). A call to arms: the organization and administration of Canada's military in World War One. Winnipeg: Bunker to Bunker Books.
- Vince, Donald M. A. R. (1950). "The Acting Overseas Sub‐Militia Council and the Resignation of Sir Sam Hughes". Canadian Historical Review. 31 (1): 1–24. doi:10.3138/CHR-031-01-01.
