= Minister of the Naval Service (Canada) =

The Minister of the Naval Service (Canada) was the federal government minister charged with oversight of the Royal Canadian Navy.

The role was established as Minister of the Naval Service and renamed Minister of Marine and Fisheries and Naval Service in October 1911.

In 1923 the National Defence Act merged the position of Minister of Militia and Defence with the Minister of the Naval Service.

The position was re-established during World War II as the Minister of National Defence for Naval Services (Canada).

== List of ministers ==
- Louis Philippe Brodeur 4 May 1910–10 August 1911
- Rodolphe Lemieux 11 August 1911–6 October 1911
- John Douglas Hazen 10 October 1911–12 October 1917
- Charles Colquhoun Ballantyne 13 October 1917–29 December 1921
- George Perry Graham 29 December 1921–31 December 1922
- vacant 1922–1923

== Previous military experience ==
Ballantyne was Commanding Officer of the 1st Battalion of Grenadier Guards from 1916 to 1917.

Hazen was Paymaster and served in the 3rd New Brunswick Regiment.

== See also ==
- Minister of Militia and Defence
- Minister of Aviation
- Minister of National Defence for Naval Services
- Minister of National Defence for Air
- Minister of Overseas Military Forces
