= Canadian Forces Morale and Welfare Services =

Canadian Forces Morale and Welfare Services (CFMWS) (French: Services de bien-être et moral des Forces canadiennes; SBMFC), previously known as Canadian Forces Personnel and Family Support Services (CFPFSS) and Canadian Forces Personnel Support Agency (CFPSA), is responsible for administering non-public property on behalf of the Chief of Defence Staff and delivering selected public morale and welfare programs, services, and activities.

== Activities ==
CFMWS has over 4,000 staff on bases/wings/units and at headquarters in Ottawa. In partnership with bases, wings, and units, the Canadian Forces Regular Forces and Canadian Forces Primary Reserve members, retired and former members, military families, Department of National Defence employees, NPF employees, and Royal Canadian Mounted Police (RCMP) personnel, receive the morale and welfare programs, services, and activities needed.

== History ==
Prior to Unification of the Canadian Forces, virtually all Non-Public Property (NPP) activities were controlled and managed at the local level. In 1969, Treasury Board introduced the concept of delivering Morale and Welfare programs through a combination of Public and NPP resources. Immediately upon Unification in 1968, the Director General Personnel Services (DGPS) was created, reporting to the Chief of Personnel. DGPS was responsible for NPP operations and Publicly funded fitness training and sports programs. At the same time, most resale activities were consolidated under the newly created CANEX. On 3 September 1996, all elements of Public and NPP Morale and Welfare program delivery were consolidated under a single NPP organization, CFPSA. Specific Public Morale and Welfare programs were delivered through the NPP organization administered by CFPSA, with the cost of implementation reimbursed by the Public to NPP.

Effective April 21, 2008, the Non-Public Property Board approved a name change for the organization from the Canadian Forces Personnel Support Agency (CFPSA) to the Canadian Forces Personnel and Family Support Services (CFPFSS). CFPFSS was formed to consolidate personnel and family support across the Canadian Forces under a single organization.

On April 15, 2013, the Non-Public Property Board approved a second name change for the organization from CFPFSS to Canadian Forces Morale and Welfare Services. This name change aimed to strengthen the association of the name with the programs and services delivered by the organization.
