= List of senators in the 28th Parliament of Canada =

This is a list of members of the Senate of Canada in the 28th Parliament of Canada.

The province of Quebec has 24 Senate divisions which are constitutionally mandated. In all other provinces, a Senate division is strictly an optional designation of the senator's own choosing, and has no real constitutional or legal standing. A senator who does not choose a special senate division is designated a senator for the province at large.

Names in bold indicate senators in the 20th Canadian Ministry.

== List of senators ==
=== Senators at the beginning of the 28th Parliament ===
Name	Party	Province (Division)	Date appointed	Appointed by	Left office	Reason
John Black Aird	Liberal	Ontario	November 10, 1964	Pearson	November 28, 1974	Resignation
Hazen Argue	Liberal	Saskatchewan	February 24, 1966	Pearson	October 2, 1991	Death
Walter Aseltine	Progressive Conservative	Saskatchewan	December 30, 1933	Bennett	March 31, 1971	Resignation
Michael Basha	Liberal	Newfoundland and Labrador	January 24, 1951	St. Laurent	November 18, 1976	Resignation
Arthur-Lucien Beaubien	Liberal	Manitoba	January 29, 1940	King	February 1, 1969	Resignation
Louis-Philippe Beaubien	Progressive Conservative	Quebec	November 16, 1960	Diefenbaker	March 28, 1985	Death
Rhéal Bélisle	Progressive Conservative	Ontario	February 4, 1963	Diefenbaker	November 3, 1992	Death
William Moore Benidickson	Liberal	Ontario	July 7, 1965	Pearson	January 4, 1985	Death
Frederick Murray Blois	Progressive Conservative	Nova Scotia	January 14, 1960	Diefenbaker	October 12, 1976	Resignation
William Albert Boucher	Liberal	Saskatchewan	January 3, 1957	St. Laurent	June 23, 1976	Death
Maurice Bourget	Liberal	Quebec	April 27, 1963	Pearson	March 29, 1979	Death
Romuald Bourque	Liberal	Quebec	July 6, 1963	Pearson	August 14, 1974	Death
George Percival Burchill	Liberal	New Brunswick	April 19, 1945	King	August 19, 1977	Resignation
Donald Cameron	Independent Liberal	Alberta	July 28, 1955	St. Laurent	September 19, 1987	Resignation
Chesley William Carter	Liberal	Newfoundland and Labrador	July 8, 1966	Pearson	July 28, 1977	Retirement
Lionel Choquette	Progressive Conservative	Ontario	January 31, 1958	Diefenbaker	March 6, 1981	Resignation
Harold Connolly	Liberal	Nova Scotia	July 28, 1955	St. Laurent	May 14, 1979	Resignation
John Joseph Connolly	Liberal	Ontario	June 12, 1953	St. Laurent	October 31, 1981	Resignation
Eric Cook	Liberal	Newfoundland and Labrador	February 14, 1964	Pearson	July 26, 1984	Resignation
David Croll	Liberal	Ontario	July 28, 1955	St. Laurent	June 11, 1991	Death
Keith Davey	Liberal	Ontario	February 24, 1966	Pearson	July 1, 1996	Resignation
Azellus Denis	Liberal	Quebec	February 3, 1964	Pearson	September 4, 1991	Death
Jean-Paul Deschatelets	Liberal	Quebec	February 24, 1966	Pearson	January 10, 1986	Resignation
Paul Desruisseaux	Liberal	Quebec	July 8, 1966	Pearson	May 1, 1980	Retirement
Jean-Marie Dessureault	Liberal	Quebec	June 9, 1945	King	August 16, 1970	Resignation
James Duggan	Liberal	Newfoundland and Labrador	July 8, 1966	Pearson	February 28, 1978	Resignation
Raymond Eudes	Liberal	Quebec	April 8, 1968	Pearson	October 25, 1980	Death
Douglas Everett	Liberal	Manitoba	November 8, 1966	Pearson	January 20, 1994	Resignation
John Wallace de Beque Farris	Liberal	British Columbia	January 9, 1937	King	February 25, 1970	Death
Muriel McQueen Fergusson	Liberal	New Brunswick	May 19, 1953	St. Laurent	May 23, 1975	Resignation
Jacques Flynn	Progressive Conservative	Quebec	November 9, 1962	Diefenbaker	August 22, 1990	Resignation
Edgar Fournier	Progressive Conservative	New Brunswick	September 24, 1962	Diefenbaker	February 11, 1983	Resignation
Sarto Fournier	Liberal	Quebec	June 12, 1953	St. Laurent	July 23, 1980	Death
Louis-Philippe Gélinas	Liberal	Quebec	June 11, 1963	Pearson	December 10, 1975	Resignation
James Gladstone	Independent Conservative	Alberta	January 31, 1958	Diefenbaker	March 31, 1971	Resignation
Léon Mercier Gouin	Liberal	Quebec	November 7, 1940	King	March 18, 1976	Resignation
Allister Grosart	Progressive Conservative	Ontario	September 24, 1962	Diefenbaker	December 13, 1981	Resignation
James Campbell Haig	Progressive Conservative	Manitoba	June 15, 1962	Diefenbaker	December 29, 1977	Resignation
Earl Hastings	Liberal	Alberta	February 24, 1966	Pearson	May 5, 1996	Death
Salter Hayden	Liberal	Ontario	February 9, 1940	King	November 1, 1983	Resignation
Harry Hays	Liberal	Alberta	February 24, 1966	Pearson	May 4, 1982	Death
Malcolm Mercer Hollett	Progressive Conservative	Newfoundland and Labrador	October 6, 1961	Diefenbaker	March 31, 1971	Resignation
Florence Elsie Inman	Liberal	Prince Edward Island	July 28, 1955	St. Laurent	May 31, 1986	Death
Olive Lillian Irvine	Progressive Conservative	Manitoba	January 14, 1960	Diefenbaker	November 1, 1969	Death
Gordon Benjamin Isnor	Liberal	Nova Scotia	May 2, 1950	St. Laurent	March 17, 1973	Death
Thomas Joseph Kickham	Liberal	Prince Edward Island	July 8, 1966	Pearson	December 1, 1974	Death
John James Kinley	Liberal	Nova Scotia	April 18, 1945	King	June 12, 1971	Resignation
Mary Elizabeth Kinnear	Liberal	Ontario	April 6, 1967	Pearson	April 3, 1973	Retirement
John Keith McBroom Laird	Liberal	Ontario	April 6, 1967	Pearson	January 12, 1982	Retirement
Maurice Lamontagne	Liberal	Quebec	April 6, 1967	Pearson	June 12, 1983	Death
Daniel Lang	Liberal	Ontario	February 14, 1964	Pearson	June 13, 1994	Resignation
Léopold Langlois	Liberal	Quebec	July 8, 1966	Pearson	October 2, 1988	Retirement
J.-Eugène Lefrançois	Liberal	Quebec	April 25, 1957	St. Laurent	November 5, 1976	Resignation
Thomas D'Arcy Leonard	Liberal	Ontario	July 28, 1955	St. Laurent	April 29, 1970	Resignation
John Joseph MacDonald	Progressive Conservative	Prince Edward Island	January 27, 1958	Diefenbaker	April 20, 1971	Resignation
John Michael Macdonald	Progressive Conservative	Nova Scotia	June 24, 1960	Diefenbaker	June 20, 1997	Death
Norman MacKenzie	Independent Liberal	British Columbia	February 24, 1966	Pearson	January 5, 1969	Retirement
Alan Macnaughton	Liberal	Quebec	July 8, 1966	Pearson	July 30, 1978	Retirement
**Paul Martin Sr.**	**Liberal**	**Ontario**	**April 20, 1968**	**Trudeau**	**October 30, 1974**	**Resignation**
Alexander Hamilton McDonald	Liberal	Saskatchewan	August 13, 1965	Pearson	March 31, 1980	Death
Charles McElman	Liberal	New Brunswick	February 24, 1966	Pearson	April 1, 1990	Resignation
Frederic McGrand	Liberal	New Brunswick	July 28, 1955	St. Laurent	January 22, 1988	Resignation
Donald A. McLean	Liberal	New Brunswick	March 15, 1968	Pearson	November 5, 1973	Death
Léon Méthot	Progressive Conservative	Quebec	October 12, 1957	Diefenbaker	August 6, 1972	Death
Hervé Michaud	Liberal	New Brunswick	March 15, 1968	Pearson	June 5, 1978	Death
Hartland Molson	Independent	Quebec	July 28, 1955	St. Laurent	May 31, 1993	Resignation
Gustave Monette	Progressive Conservative	Quebec	October 12, 1957	Diefenbaker	December 23, 1969	Death
John Lang Nichol	Liberal	British Columbia	February 24, 1966	Pearson	April 19, 1973	Resignation
Clement O'Leary	Progressive Conservative	Nova Scotia	September 25, 1962	Diefenbaker	June 12, 1969	Death
Grattan O'Leary	Progressive Conservative	Ontario	September 24, 1962	Diefenbaker	April 7, 1976	Death
Norman McLeod Paterson	Liberal	Ontario	February 9, 1940	King	June 18, 1981	Resignation
Arthur Maurice Pearson	Progressive Conservative	Saskatchewan	October 12, 1957	Diefenbaker	March 31, 1971	Resignation
William Petten	Liberal	Newfoundland and Labrador	April 8, 1968	Pearson	January 28, 1998	Retirement
Lazarus Phillips	Liberal	Quebec	February 9, 1968	Pearson	October 10, 1970	Retirement
Orville Howard Phillips	Progressive Conservative	Prince Edward Island	February 5, 1963	Diefenbaker	March 24, 1999	Resignation
Jean-François Pouliot	Liberal	Quebec	July 28, 1955	St. Laurent	June 28, 1968	Resignation
James Harper Prowse	Liberal	Alberta	February 24, 1966	Pearson	September 27, 1976	Death
Josie Alice Quart	Progressive Conservative	Quebec	November 16, 1960	Diefenbaker	April 17, 1980	Death
Nelson Rattenbury	Liberal	New Brunswick	February 14, 1964	Pearson	May 27, 1973	Death
Arthur Roebuck	Liberal	Ontario	April 18, 1945	King	November 17, 1971	Death
Calixte Savoie	Independent Liberal	New Brunswick	July 28, 1955	St. Laurent	August 23, 1970	Resignation
Donald Smith	Liberal	Nova Scotia	July 28, 1955	St. Laurent	July 7, 1980	Resignation
Sydney John Smith	Liberal	British Columbia	January 3, 1957	St. Laurent	December 31, 1968	Resignation
Herbert O. Sparrow	Liberal	Saskatchewan	February 9, 1968	Pearson	January 4, 2005	Retirement
Richard Stanbury	Liberal	Ontario	February 13, 1968	Pearson	May 2, 1998	Retirement
Joseph Albert Sullivan	Progressive Conservative	Ontario	October 12, 1957	Diefenbaker	February 18, 1985	Resignation
Edward Joseph Thériault	Liberal	Nova Scotia	April 20, 1968	Trudeau	December 20, 1968	Death
Andy Thompson	Liberal	Ontario	April 6, 1967	Pearson	March 23, 1998	Resignation
Gunnar Thorvaldson	Progressive Conservative	Manitoba	January 29, 1958	Diefenbaker	August 2, 1969	Death
Earl Wallace Urquhart	Liberal	Nova Scotia	February 24, 1966	Pearson	August 17, 1971	Death
Cyrille Vaillancourt	Liberal	Quebec	March 3, 1944	King	January 3, 1969	Resignation
David James Walker	Progressive Conservative	Ontario	February 4, 1963	Diefenbaker	September 30, 1989	Resignation
Frank Corbett Welch	Progressive Conservative	Nova Scotia	September 25, 1962	Diefenbaker	July 14, 1975	Resignation
George Stanley White	Progressive Conservative	Ontario	September 20, 1957	Diefenbaker	November 17, 1972	Resignation
Harry Albert Willis	Progressive Conservative	Ontario	June 15, 1962	Diefenbaker	March 23, 1972	Death
Paul Yuzyk	Progressive Conservative	Manitoba	February 4, 1963	Diefenbaker	July 9, 1986	Death

=== Senators appointed during the 28th Parliament ===
Name	Party	Province (Division)	Date appointed	Appointed by	Left office	Reason
Hédard Robichaud	Liberal	New Brunswick	June 28, 1968	Trudeau	October 8, 1971	Resignation
Louis Giguère	Liberal	Quebec	September 10, 1968	Trudeau	December 18, 1986	Retirement
Nancy Bell	Liberal	British Columbia	October 7, 1970	Trudeau	November 29, 1989	Death
Thérèse Casgrain	Independent	Quebec	October 7, 1970	Trudeau	July 10, 1971	Retirement
Eugene Forsey	Liberal	Ontario	October 7, 1970	Trudeau	May 29, 1979	Retirement
Paul Lafond	Liberal	Quebec	October 7, 1970	Trudeau	May 27, 1988	Death
Edward M. Lawson	Independent	British Columbia	October 7, 1970	Trudeau	September 24, 2004	Retirement
Ernest Manning	Social Credit	Alberta	October 7, 1970	Trudeau	September 20, 1983	Retirement
William Craig McNamara	Liberal	Manitoba	October 7, 1970	Trudeau	August 8, 1979	Retirement
Gildas Molgat	Liberal	Manitoba	October 7, 1970	Trudeau	February 28, 2001	Death
Lorne Bonnell	Liberal	Prince Edward Island	November 4, 1971	Trudeau	January 4, 1998	Retirement
Sidney Buckwold	Liberal	Saskatchewan	November 4, 1971	Trudeau	November 3, 1991	Retirement
Carl Goldenberg	Liberal	Quebec	November 4, 1971	Trudeau	October 20, 1982	Retirement
George Van Roggen	Liberal	British Columbia	November 4, 1971	Trudeau	June 8, 1992	Death
Renaude Lapointe	Liberal	Quebec	November 10, 1971	Trudeau	January 3, 1987	Retirement
J. Michel Fournier	Liberal	New Brunswick	December 9, 1971	Trudeau	September 29, 1980	Retirement
Frederick William Rowe	Liberal	Newfoundland and Labrador	December 9, 1971	Trudeau	September 28, 1987	Retirement
Guy Williams	Liberal	British Columbia	December 9, 1971	Trudeau	October 7, 1982	Retirement
Alasdair Graham	Liberal	Nova Scotia	April 27, 1972	Trudeau	May 21, 2004	Retirement
Henry Hicks	Liberal	Nova Scotia	April 27, 1972	Trudeau	March 5, 1990	Retirement
George McIlraith	Liberal	Ontario	April 27, 1972	Trudeau	July 29, 1983	Retirement
Margaret Norrie	Liberal	Nova Scotia	April 27, 1972	Trudeau	October 16, 1980	Retirement
Martial Asselin	Progressive Conservative	Quebec	September 1, 1972	Trudeau	August 7, 1990	Resignation
**Jean-Pierre Côté**	**Liberal**	**Quebec**	**September 1, 1972**	**Trudeau**	**April 20, 1978**	**Resignation**
Joe Greene	Liberal	Ontario	September 1, 1972	Trudeau	October 23, 1978	Death
Arthur Laing	Liberal	British Columbia	September 1, 1972	Trudeau	February 13, 1975	Death
Joan Neiman	Liberal	Ontario	September 1, 1972	Trudeau	September 9, 1995	Retirement

=== Left Senate during the 28th Parliament ===
Date	Name	Party	Representing	Details

=== Changes in party affiliation during the 28th Parliament ===
Date	Name	Party (current)	Party (previously)	Details

== See also ==
- List of current Canadian senators
