= List of senators in the 27th Parliament of Canada =

The following is a list of senators in the 27th Parliament of Canada.

Names in bold indicate senators in the 19th Canadian Ministry, and the 20th Canadian Ministry appointed before the parliament was dissolved.

Name	Party	Province (Division)	Date appointed	Nominated by	Left office	Reason	Start	End
John Black Aird	Liberal	Ontario	November 10, 1964	Pearson	November 28, 1974	Resignation	No	No
Hazen Argue	Liberal	Saskatchewan	February 24, 1966	Pearson	October 2, 1991	Death	Yes	No
Walter Aseltine	Progressive Conservative	Saskatchewan	December 30, 1933	Bennett	March 31, 1971	Resignation	No	No
Alexander Boyd Baird	Liberal	Newfoundland and Labrador	August 17, 1949	St-Laurent	November 23, 1967	Death	No	Yes
Michael Basha	Liberal	Newfoundland and Labrador	January 24, 1951	St-Laurent	November 18, 1976	Resignation	No	No
Arthur-Lucien Beaubien	Liberal	Manitoba	January 29, 1940	King	February 1, 1969	Resignation	No	No
Louis-Philippe Beaubien	Progressive Conservative	Quebec (Bedford)	November 16, 1960	Diefenbaker	March 28, 1985	Death	No	No
Rhéal Bélisle	Progressive Conservative	Ontario	February 4, 1963	Diefenbaker	November 3, 1992	Death	No	No
William Moore Benidickson	Liberal	Ontario	July 7, 1965	Pearson	January 4, 1985	Death	No	No
Charles Lawrence Bishop	Liberal	Ontario	April 18, 1945	King	September 23, 1966	Resignation	No	Yes
Frederick Murray Blois	Progressive Conservative	Nova Scotia	January 14, 1960	Diefenbaker	October 12, 1976	Resignation	No	No
William Albert Boucher	Liberal	Saskatchewan	January 3, 1957	St-Laurent	June 23, 1976	Death	No	No
Paul Henri Bouffard	Liberal	Quebec (Grandville)	December 27, 1946	King	February 16, 1966	Death	No	Yes
Maurice Bourget	Liberal	Quebec (The Laurentides)	April 27, 1963	Pearson	March 29, 1979	Death	No	No
Romuald Bourque	Liberal	Quebec (De la Vallière)	July 6, 1963	Pearson	August 14, 1974	Death	No	No
Frederick Gordon Bradley	Liberal	Newfoundland and Labrador	June 12, 1953	St-Laurent	March 30, 1966	Death	No	Yes
Alfred Johnson Brooks	Progressive Conservative	New Brunswick	September 12, 1960	Diefenbaker	November 7, 1967	Resignation	No	Yes
George Percival Burchill	Liberal	New Brunswick	April 19, 1945	King	August 19, 1977	Resignation	No	No
Donald Cameron	Independent Liberal	Alberta	July 28, 1955	St-Laurent	September 19, 1987	Resignation	No	No
Chesley William Carter	Liberal	Newfoundland and Labrador	July 8, 1966	Pearson	July 28, 1977	Retirement	Yes	No
Lionel Choquette	Progressive Conservative	Ontario	January 31, 1958	Diefenbaker	March 6, 1981	Resignation	No	No
Joseph Willie Comeau	Liberal	Nova Scotia	December 1, 1948	St-Laurent	January 10, 1966	Resignation	No	Yes
Harold Connolly	Liberal	Nova Scotia	July 28, 1955	St-Laurent	May 14, 1979	Resignation	No	No
**John Joseph Connolly**	Liberal	Ontario	June 12, 1953	St-Laurent	October 31, 1981	Resignation	No	No
Eric Cook	Liberal	Newfoundland and Labrador	February 14, 1964	Pearson	July 26, 1984	Resignation	No	No
Thomas Crerar	Liberal	Manitoba	April 18, 1945	King	May 31, 1966	Resignation	No	Yes
David Croll	Liberal	Ontario	July 28, 1955	St-Laurent	June 11, 1991	Death	No	No
Keith Davey	Liberal	Ontario	February 24, 1966	Pearson	July 1, 1996	Resignation	Yes	No
Rupert Davies	Liberal	Ontario	November 19, 1942	King	March 11, 1967	Death	No	Yes
Azellus Denis	Liberal	Quebec (La Salle)	February 3, 1964	Pearson	September 4, 1991	Death	No	No
Jean-Paul Deschatelets	Liberal	Quebec (Lauzon)	February 24, 1966	Pearson	January 10, 1986	Resignation	Yes	No
Paul Desruisseaux	Liberal	Quebec (Wellington)	July 8, 1966	Pearson	May 1, 1980	Retirement	Yes	No
Jean-Marie Dessureault	Liberal	Quebec (Stadacona)	June 9, 1945	King	August 16, 1970	Resignation	No	No
James Duggan	Liberal	Newfoundland and Labrador	July 8, 1966	Pearson	February 28, 1978	Resignation	Yes	No
Vincent Dupuis	Liberal	Quebec (Rigaud)	April 18, 1945	King	May 11, 1967	Death	No	Yes
Raymond Eudes	Liberal	Quebec (De Lorimier)	April 8, 1968	Pearson	October 25, 1980	Death	Yes	No
Douglas Everett	Liberal	Manitoba	November 8, 1966	Pearson	January 20, 1994	Resignation	Yes	No
John Wallace de Beque Farris	Liberal	British Columbia	January 9, 1937	King	February 25, 1970	Death	No	No
Muriel McQueen Fergusson	Liberal	British Columbia	May 19, 1953	St-Laurent	May 23, 1975	Resignation	No	No
Jacques Flynn	Progressive Conservative	Quebec (Rougemont)	November 9, 1962	Diefenbaker	August 22, 1990	Resignation	No	No
Edgar Fournier	Progressive Conservative	New Brunswick	September 24, 1962	Diefenbaker	February 11, 1983	Resignation	No	No
Sarto Fournier	Liberal	Quebec (De Lanaudière)	June 12, 1953	St-Laurent	July 23, 1980	Death	No	No
Louis-Philippe Gélinas	Liberal	Quebec (Montarville)	June 11, 1963	Peareson	December 10, 1975	Resignation	No	No
Frederick William Gershaw	Liberal	Alberta	April 18, 1945	King	March 26, 1968	Resignation	No	Yes
James Gladstone	Independent Conservative	Alberta	January 31, 1958	Diefenbaker	March 31, 1971	Resignation	No	No
Léon Mercier Gouin	Liberal	Quebec (De Salaberry)	November 7, 1940	King	March 18, 1976	Resignation	No	No
Allister Grosart	Progressive Conservative	Ontario	September 24, 1962	Diefenbaker	December 13, 1981	Resignation	No	No
James Campbell Haig	Progressive Conservative	Manitoba	June 15, 1962	Diefenbaker	December 29, 1977	Resignation	No	No
Earl Hastings	Liberal	Alberta	February 24, 1966	Pearson	May 5, 1996	Death	Yes	No
Salter Hayden	Liberal	Ontario	February 9, 1940	King	November 1, 1983	Resignation	No	No
Harry Hays	Liberal	Alberta	February 24, 1966	Pearson	May 4, 1982	Death	Yes	No
John Hnatyshyn	Progressive Conservative	Saskatchewan	January 15, 1959	Diefenbaker	May 2, 1967	Death	No	Yes
Malcolm Mercer Hollett	Progressive Conservative	Newfoundland and Labrador	October 6, 1961	Diefenbaker	March 31, 1971	Resignation	No	No
Adrian Norton Knatchbull Hugessen	Liberal	Quebec (Inkerman)	January 12, 1937	King	January 1, 1967	Resignation	No	No
Florence Elsie Inman	Liberal	Prince Edward Island	July 28, 1955	St-Laurent	May 31, 1986	Death	No	No
Olive Lillian Irvine	Progressive Conservative	Manitoba	January 14, 1960	Diefenbaker	November 1, 1969	Death	No	No
Gordon Benjamin Isnor	Liberal	Nova Scotia	May 2, 1950	St-Laurent	March 17, 1973	Death	No	No
Mariana Beauchamp Jodoin	Liberal	Quebec (Saurel)	May 19, 1953	St-Laurent	June 1, 1966	Resignation	No	Yes
Thomas Joseph Kickham	Liberal	Prince Edward Island	July 8, 1966	Pearson	December 1, 1974	Death	Yes	No
John James Kinley	Liberal	Nova Scotia	April 18, 1945	King	June 12, 1971	Resignation	No	No
Mary Elizabeth Kinnear	Liberal	Ontario	April 6, 1967	Pearson	April 3, 1973	Retirement	Yes	No
John Keith McBroom Laird	Liberal	Ontario	April 6, 1967	Pearson	January 12, 1982	Retirement	Yes	No
Maurice Lamontagne	Liberal	Quebec (Inkerman)	April 6, 1967	Pearson	June 12, 1983	Death	Yes	No
Danieln Lang	Liberal	Ontario	February 14, 1964	Pearson	June 13, 1994	Resignation	No	No
Léopold Langlois	Liberal	Quebec (Grandville)	July 8, 1966	Pearson	October 2, 1988	Retirement	Yes	No
Eugène Lefrançois	Liberal	Quebec (Repentigny)	April 25, 1957	St-Laurent	November 5, 1976	Resignation	No	No
Thomas D'Arcy Leonard	Liberal	Ontario	July 28, 1955	St-Laurent	April 29, 1970	Resignation	No	No
John Joseph MacDonald	Progressive Conservative	Prince Edward Island	January 27, 1958	Diefenbaker	April 20, 1971	Resignation	No	No
John Michael Macdonald	Progressive Conservative	Nova Scotia	June 24, 1960	Diefenbaker	June 20, 1997	Death	No	No
**William Ross Macdonald**	Liberal	Ontario	June 12, 1953	St-Laurent	December 22, 1967	Resignation	No	Yes
Norman MacKenzie	Independent Liberal	British Columbia	February 24, 1966	Pearson	January 5, 1969	Retirement	Yes	No
Alan Macnaughton	Liberal	Quebec (Saurel)	July 8, 1966	Pearson	July 30, 1978	Retirement	Yes	No
**Paul Joseph James Martin**	Liberal	Ontario	April 20, 1968	Trudeau	October 30, 1974	Resignation	Yes	No
Malcolm Wallace McCutcheon	Progressive Conservative	Ontario	August 9, 1962	Diefenbaker	May 13, 1968	Resignation	No	No
Alexander Hamilton McDonald	Liberal	Saskatchewan	August 13, 1965	Pearson	March 31, 1980	Death	No	No
Charles McElman	Liberal	New Brunswick	February 24, 1966	Pearson	April 1, 1990	Resignation	Yes	No
Frederic McGrand	Liberal	New Brunswick	July 28, 1955	St-Laurent	January 22, 1988	Resignation	No	No
Stanley McKeen	Liberal	British Columbia	January 27, 1947	King	December 1, 1966	Death	No	Yes
Alexander Neil McLean	Liberal	New Brunswick	April 18, 1945	King	March 12, 1967	Death	No	Yes
Donald A. McLean	Liberal	New Brunswick	March 15, 1968	Pearson	November 5, 1973	Death	Yes	No
Léon Méthot	Progressive Conservative	Quebec (Shawinigan)	October 12, 1957	Diefenbaker	August 6, 1972	Death	No	No
Hervé Michaud	Liberal	New Brunswick	March 15, 1968	Pearson	June 5, 1978	Death	Yes	No
Hartland Molson	Independent	Quebec (Alma)	July 28, 1955	St-Laurent	May 31, 1993	Resignation	No	No
Gustave Monette	Progressive Conservative	Quebec (Mille Isles)	October 12, 1957	Diefenbaker	December 23, 1969	Death	No	No
John Lang Nichol	Liberal	British Columbia	February 24, 1966	Pearson	April 19, 1973	Resignation	Yes	No
Clement Augustine O'Leary	Progressive Conservative	Nova Scotia	September 25, 1962	Diefenbaker	June 12, 1969	Death	No	No
Grattan O'Leary	Progressive Conservative	Ontario	September 25, 1962	Diefenbaker	April 7, 1976	Death	No	No
Norman McLeod Paterson	Liberal	Ontario	February 9, 1940	King	June 18, 1981	Resignation	No	No
Arthur Maurice Pearson	Progressive Conservative	Saskatchewan	October 12, 1957	Diefenbaker	March 31, 1971	Resignation	No	No
William Petten	Liberal	Newfoundland and Labrador	April 8, 1968	Pearson	January 28, 1998	Resignation	Yes	No
Lazarus Phillips	Liberal	Quebec (Rigaud)	February 9, 1968	Pearson	October 10, 1970	Retirement	Yes	No
Orville Howard Phillips	Progressive Conservative	Prince Edward Island	February 5, 1963	Diefenbaker	March 24, 1999	Resignation	No	No
Jean-François Pouliot	Liberal	Quebec (De la Durantaye)	July 28, 1955	St-Laurent	June 28, 1968	Resignation	No	No
Charles Gavan Power	Liberal	Quebec (Gulf)	July 28, 1955	St-Laurent	May 30, 1968	Death	No	No
James Harper Prowse	Liberal	Alberta	February 24, 1966	Pearson	September 27, 1976	Death	Yes	No
Josie Alice Quart	Progressive Conservative	Quebec (Victoria)	November 16, 1960	Diefenbaker	April 17, 1980	Death	No	No
Nelson Rattenbury	Liberal	New Brunswick	February 14, 1964	Pearson	May 27, 1973	Death	No	No
Thomas Reid	Liberal	British Columbia	September 7, 1949	St-Laurent	October 14, 1967	Resignation	No	Yes
Arthur Roebuck	Liberal	Ontario	April 18, 1945	King	November 17, 1971	Death	No	No
Calixte Savoie	Independent Liberal	New Brunswick	July 28, 1955	St-Laurent	August 23, 1970	Resignation	No	No
Donald Smith	Liberal	Nova Scotia	July 28, 1955	St-Laurent	July 7, 1980	Resignation	No	No
Sydney John Smith	Liberal	British Columbia	January 3, 1957	St-Laurent	December 31, 1968	Resignation	No	No
Herbert O. Sparrow	Liberal	Saskatchewan	February 9, 1968	Pearson	January 4, 2005	Retirement	Yes	No
Richard Stanbury	Liberal	Ontario	February 13, 1968	Pearson	May 2, 1998	Retirement	Yes	No
Joseph Albert Sullivan	Progressive Conservative	Ontario	October 12, 1957	Diefenbaker	February 18, 1985	Resignation	No	No
William Horace Taylor	Liberal	Ontario	April 18, 1945	King	June 1, 1966	Resignation	No	Yes
Edward Joseph Thériault	Liberal	Nova Scotia	April 20, 1968	Trudeau	December 20, 1968	Death	Yes	No
Andy Thompson	Liberal	Ontario	April 6, 1967	Pearson	March 23, 1998	Resignation	Yes	No
Gunnar Thorvaldson	Progressive Conservative	Manitoba	January 29, 1958	Diefenbaker	August 2, 1969	Death	No	No
Earl Wallace Urquhart	Liberal	Nova Scotia	February 24, 1966	Pearson	August 17, 1971	Death	Yes	No
Cyrille Vaillancourt	Liberal	Quebec (Kennebec)	March 3, 1944	King	January 3, 1969	Resignation	No	No
Clarence Joseph Veniot	Liberal	New Brunswick	April 18, 1945	King	June 1, 1966	Resignation	No	Yes
Thomas Vien	Liberal	Quebec (De Lorimier)	October 5, 1942	King	April 1, 1968	Resignation	No	Yes
David James Walker	Progressive Conservative	Ontario	February 4, 1963	Diefenbaker	September 30, 1989	Resignation	No	No
Frank Corbett Welch	Progressive Conservative	Nova Scotia	September 25, 1962	Diefenbaker	July 14, 1975	Resignation	No	No
George Stanley White	Progressive Conservative	Ontario	September 20, 1957	Diefenbaker	November 17, 1972	Resignation	No	No
Harry Albert Willis	Progressive Conservative	Ontario	June 15, 1962	Diefenbaker	March 23, 1972	Death	No	No
Allan Lee Woodrow	Liberal	Ontario	May 19, 1953	St-Laurent	March 15, 1966	Resignation	No	Yes
Paul Yuzyk	Progressive Conservative	Manitoba	February 4, 1963	Diefenbaker	July 9, 1986	Death	No	No

== See also ==
- List of current senators of Canada
