= List of senators in the 32nd Parliament of Canada =

This is a list of members of the Senate of Canada in the 32nd Parliament of Canada.

The province of Quebec has 24 Senate divisions which are constitutionally mandated. In all other provinces, a Senate division is strictly an optional designation of the senator's own choosing, and has no real constitutional or legal standing. A senator who does not choose a special senate division is designated a senator for the province at large.

Names in bold indicate senators in the 22nd or 23rd Canadian Ministry.

== List of senators ==
=== Senators at the beginning of the 32nd Parliament ===
Name	Party	Province (Division)	Date appointed	Appointed by	Left office	Reason
Willie Adams	Liberal	Northwest Territories	April 5, 1977	Trudeau	June 22, 2009	Retirement
Margaret Jean Anderson	Liberal	New Brunswick	March 23, 1978	Trudeau	August 7, 1990	Retirement
**Hazen Argue**	**Liberal**	**Saskatchewan**	**February 24, 1966**	**Pearson**	**October 2, 1991**	**Death**
Martial Asselin	Progressive Conservative	Quebec	September 1, 1972	Trudeau	August 7, 1990	Resignation
**Jack Austin**	**Liberal**	**British Columbia**	**August 19, 1975**	**Trudeau**	**March 2, 2007**	**Retirement**
James Balfour	Progressive Conservative	Saskatchewan	September 13, 1979	Clark	December 12, 1999	Death
Irvine Barrow	Liberal	Nova Scotia	May 8, 1974	Trudeau	February 15, 1988	Retirement
Louis-Philippe Beaubien	Progressive Conservative	Quebec	November 16, 1960	Diefenbaker	March 28, 1985	Death
Rhéal Bélisle	Progressive Conservative	Ontario	February 4, 1963	Diefenbaker	November 3, 1992	Death
Nancy Bell	Liberal	British Columbia	October 7, 1970	Trudeau	November 29, 1989	Death
William Moore Benidickson	Liberal	Ontario	July 7, 1965	Pearson	January 4, 1985	Death
Martha Bielish	Progressive Conservative	Alberta	September 27, 1979	Clark	September 26, 1990	Resignation
Florence Bird	Liberal	Ontario	March 23, 1978	Trudeau	January 15, 1983	Retirement
Lorne Bonnell	Liberal	Prince Edward Island	November 4, 1971	Trudeau	January 4, 1998	Retirement
Peter Bosa	Liberal	Ontario	April 5, 1977	Trudeau	December 10, 1998	Death
Sidney Buckwold	Liberal	Saskatchewan	November 4, 1971	Trudeau	November 3, 1991	Retirement
Donald Cameron	Independent Liberal	Alberta	July 28, 1955	St. Laurent	September 19, 1987	Resignation
Guy Charbonneau	Progressive Conservative	Quebec	September 27, 1979	Clark	June 21, 1997	Retirement
Lionel Choquette	Progressive Conservative	Ontario	January 31, 1958	Diefenbaker	March 6, 1981	Resignation
John Joseph Connolly	Liberal	Ontario	June 12, 1953	St. Laurent	October 31, 1981	Resignation
Eric Cook	Liberal	Newfoundland and Labrador	February 14, 1964	Pearson	July 26, 1984	Resignation
Ernest G. Cottreau	Liberal	Nova Scotia	May 8, 1974	Trudeau	January 28, 1989	Retirement
David Croll	Liberal	Ontario	July 28, 1955	St. Laurent	June 11, 1991	Death
Keith Davey	Liberal	Ontario	February 24, 1966	Pearson	July 1, 1996	Resignation
Azellus Denis	Liberal	Quebec	February 3, 1964	Pearson	September 4, 1991	Death
Jean-Paul Deschatelets	Liberal	Quebec	February 24, 1966	Pearson	January 10, 1986	Resignation
Paul Desruisseaux	Liberal	Quebec	July 8, 1966	Pearson	May 1, 1980	Retirement
Richard Donahoe	Progressive Conservative	Nova Scotia	September 13, 1979	Clark	September 27, 1984	Retirement
C. William Doody	Progressive Conservative	Newfoundland and Labrador	October 3, 1979	Clark	December 27, 2005	Death
Raymond Eudes	Liberal	Quebec	April 8, 1968	Pearson	October 25, 1980	Death
Douglas Everett	Liberal	Manitoba	November 8, 1966	Pearson	January 20, 1994	Resignation
Jacques Flynn	Progressive Conservative	Quebec	November 9, 1962	Diefenbaker	August 22, 1990	Resignation
Edgar Fournier	Progressive Conservative	New Brunswick	September 24, 1962	Diefenbaker	February 11, 1983	Resignation
J. Michel Fournier	Liberal	New Brunswick	December 9, 1971	Trudeau	September 29, 1980	Retirement
Sarto Fournier	Liberal	Quebec	June 12, 1953	St. Laurent	July 23, 1980	Death
Royce Frith	Liberal	Ontario	April 5, 1977	Trudeau	August 29, 1994	Resignation
Louis Giguère	Liberal	Quebec	September 10, 1968	Trudeau	December 18, 1986	Retirement
John Morrow Godfrey	Liberal	Ontario	October 5, 1973	Trudeau	June 28, 1987	Retirement
Carl Goldenberg	Liberal	Quebec	November 4, 1971	Trudeau	October 20, 1982	Retirement
Alasdair Graham	Liberal	Nova Scotia	April 27, 1972	Trudeau	May 21, 2004	Retirement
Allister Grosart	Progressive Conservative	Ontario	September 24, 1962	Diefenbaker	December 13, 1981	Resignation
Joseph-Philippe Guay	Liberal	Manitoba	March 23, 1978	Trudeau	October 4, 1990	Retirement
Stanley Haidasz	Liberal	Ontario	March 23, 1978	Trudeau	March 4, 1998	Retirement
Earl Hastings	Liberal	Alberta	February 24, 1966	Pearson	May 5, 1996	Death
Salter Hayden	Liberal	Ontario	February 9, 1940	King	November 1, 1983	Resignation
Harry Hays	Liberal	Alberta	February 24, 1966	Pearson	May 4, 1982	Death
Henry Hicks	Liberal	Nova Scotia	April 27, 1972	Trudeau	March 5, 1990	Retirement
Florence Elsie Inman	Liberal	Prince Edward Island	July 28, 1955	St. Laurent	May 31, 1986	Death
Paul Lafond	Liberal	Quebec	October 7, 1970	Trudeau	May 27, 1988	Death
John Keith McBroom Laird	Liberal	Ontario	April 6, 1967	Pearson	January 12, 1982	Retirement
Maurice Lamontagne	Liberal	Quebec	April 6, 1967	Pearson	June 12, 1983	Death
Daniel Lang	Liberal	Ontario	February 14, 1964	Pearson	June 13, 1994	Resignation
Léopold Langlois	Liberal	Quebec	July 8, 1966	Pearson	October 2, 1988	Retirement
Renaude Lapointe	Liberal	Quebec	November 10, 1971	Trudeau	January 3, 1987	Retirement
Edward M. Lawson	Independent	British Columbia	October 7, 1970	Trudeau	September 24, 2004	Retirement
Fernand Leblanc	Liberal	Quebec	March 27, 1979	Trudeau	July 1, 1992	Retirement
Philip Lewis	Liberal	Newfoundland and Labrador	March 23, 1978	Trudeau	November 28, 1999	Retirement
Paul Lucier	Liberal	Yukon	October 23, 1975	Trudeau	July 23, 1999	Death
John Michael Macdonald	Progressive Conservative	Nova Scotia	June 24, 1960	Diefenbaker	June 20, 1997	Death
Heath MacQuarrie	Progressive Conservative	Prince Edward Island	October 3, 1979	Clark	September 18, 1994	Retirement
Ernest Manning	Social Credit	Alberta	October 7, 1970	Trudeau	September 20, 1983	Retirement
Jean Marchand	Liberal	Quebec	December 9, 1976	Trudeau	December 15, 1983	Resignation
Jack Marshall	Progressive Conservative	Newfoundland and Labrador	March 23, 1978	Trudeau	November 26, 1994	Retirement
Alexander Hamilton McDonald	Liberal	Saskatchewan	August 13, 1965	Pearson	March 31, 1980	Death
Charles McElman	Liberal	New Brunswick	February 24, 1966	Pearson	April 1, 1990	Resignation
Frederic McGrand	Liberal	New Brunswick	July 28, 1955	St. Laurent	January 22, 1988	Resignation
George McIlraith	Liberal	Ontario	April 27, 1972	Trudeau	July 29, 1983	Retirement
Gildas Molgat	Liberal	Manitoba	October 7, 1970	Trudeau	February 28, 2001	Death
Hartland Molson	Independent	Quebec	July 28, 1955	St. Laurent	May 31, 1993	Resignation
Robert Muir	Progressive Conservative	Nova Scotia	March 26, 1979	Trudeau	November 10, 1994	Retirement
Lowell Murray	Progressive Conservative	Ontario	September 13, 1979	Clark	September 26, 2011	Retirement
Joan Neiman	Liberal	Ontario	September 1, 1972	Trudeau	September 9, 1995	Retirement
Margaret Norrie	Liberal	Nova Scotia	April 27, 1972	Trudeau	October 16, 1980	Retirement
Nathan Nurgitz	Progressive Conservative	Manitoba	October 3, 1979	Clark	February 9, 1993	Resignation
**Bud Olson**	**Liberal**	**Alberta**	**April 5, 1977**	**Trudeau**	**March 7, 1996**	**Resignation**
Norman McLeod Paterson	Liberal	Ontario	February 9, 1940	King	June 18, 1981	Resignation
**Ray Perrault**	**Liberal**	**British Columbia**	**October 5, 1973**	**Trudeau**	**February 6, 2001**	**Retirement**
William Petten	Liberal	Newfoundland and Labrador	April 8, 1968	Pearson	January 28, 1998	Retirement
Orville Howard Phillips	Progressive Conservative	Prince Edward Island	February 5, 1963	Diefenbaker	March 24, 1999	Resignation
Josie Alice Quart	Progressive Conservative	Quebec	November 16, 1960	Diefenbaker	April 17, 1980	Death
Maurice Riel	Liberal	Quebec	October 5, 1973	Trudeau	April 3, 1997	Retirement
Daniel Aloysius Riley	Liberal	New Brunswick	December 21, 1973	Trudeau	September 13, 1984	Death
Pietro Rizzuto	Liberal	Quebec	December 23, 1976	Trudeau	August 3, 1997	Death
Louis Robichaud	Liberal	New Brunswick	December 21, 1973	Trudeau	October 21, 2000	Retirement
Dufferin Roblin	Progressive Conservative	Manitoba	March 23, 1978	Trudeau	June 17, 1992	Retirement
Yvette Boucher Rousseau	Liberal	Quebec	March 27, 1979	Trudeau	March 17, 1988	Death
Frederick William Rowe	Liberal	Newfoundland and Labrador	December 9, 1971	Trudeau	September 28, 1987	Retirement
Cyril Sherwood	Progressive Conservative	New Brunswick	October 3, 1979	Clark	July 1, 1990	Retirement
Donald Smith	Liberal	Nova Scotia	July 28, 1955	St. Laurent	July 7, 1980	Resignation
George Isaac Smith	Progressive Conservative	Nova Scotia	August 7, 1975	Trudeau	December 19, 1982	Death
Herbert O. Sparrow	Liberal	Saskatchewan	February 9, 1968	Pearson	January 4, 2005	Retirement
Richard Stanbury	Liberal	Ontario	February 13, 1968	Pearson	May 2, 1998	Retirement
David Steuart	Liberal	Saskatchewan	December 9, 1976	Trudeau	January 26, 1991	Retirement
Joseph Albert Sullivan	Progressive Conservative	Ontario	October 12, 1957	Diefenbaker	February 18, 1985	Resignation
Norbert Thériault	Liberal	New Brunswick	March 26, 1979	Trudeau	February 16, 1996	Retirement
Andy Thompson	Liberal	Ontario	April 6, 1967	Pearson	March 23, 1998	Resignation
Arthur Tremblay	Progressive Conservative	Quebec	September 27, 1979	Clark	June 18, 1992	Retirement
George Van Roggen	Liberal	British Columbia	November 4, 1971	Trudeau	June 8, 1992	Death
David James Walker	Progressive Conservative	Ontario	February 4, 1963	Diefenbaker	September 30, 1989	Resignation
Guy Williams	Liberal	British Columbia	December 9, 1971	Trudeau	October 7, 1982	Retirement
Dalia Wood	Liberal	Quebec	March 26, 1979	Trudeau	January 31, 1999	Resignation
Paul Yuzyk	Progressive Conservative	Manitoba	February 4, 1963	Diefenbaker	July 9, 1986	Death

=== Senators appointed during the 32nd Parliament ===
Name	Party	Province (Division)	Date appointed	Appointed by	Left office	Reason
Peter Stollery	Liberal	Ontario	July 2, 1981	Trudeau	November 29, 2010	Retirement
Michael Pitfield	Independent	Ontario	December 22, 1982	Trudeau	June 1, 2010	Resignation
William McDonough Kelly	Progressive Conservative	Ontario	December 23, 1982	Trudeau	July 21, 2000	Retirement
Jean Le Moyne	Liberal	Quebec	December 23, 1982	Trudeau	February 17, 1988	Retirement
Jacques Hébert	Liberal	Quebec	April 20, 1983	Trudeau	June 21, 1998	Retirement
Ian David Sinclair	Liberal	Ontario	December 23, 1983	Trudeau	September 27, 1988	Retirement
Leo Kolber	Liberal	Quebec	December 23, 1983	Trudeau	January 18, 2004	Retirement
John Benjamin Stewart	Liberal	Nova Scotia	January 13, 1984	Trudeau	November 19, 1999	Retirement
Jerry Grafstein	Liberal	Ontario	January 13, 1984	Trudeau	January 2, 2010	Retirement
Michael J. L. Kirby	Liberal	Nova Scotia	January 13, 1984	Trudeau	October 31, 2006	Resignation
Philippe Gigantès	Liberal	Quebec	January 13, 1984	Trudeau	August 16, 1998	Retirement
Anne Cools	Liberal	Ontario	January 13, 1984	Trudeau	Incumbent	
Charlie Watt	Liberal	Quebec	January 16, 1984	Trudeau	Incumbent	
Lorna Marsden	Liberal	Ontario	January 24, 1984	Trudeau	August 31, 1992	Resignation
Colin Kenny	Liberal	Ontario	June 29, 1984	Trudeau	Incumbent	
Joyce Fairbairn	Liberal	Alberta	June 29, 1984	Trudeau	January 18, 2013	Resignation
Allan MacEachen	Liberal	Nova Scotia	June 29, 1984	Trudeau	July 6, 1996	Retirement
Pierre de Bané	Liberal	Quebec	June 29, 1984	Trudeau	August 2, 2013	Retirement
**Roméo LeBlanc**	**Liberal**	**New Brunswick**	**June 29, 1984**	**Trudeau**	**November 21, 1994**	**Resignation**
Leonard Marchand	Liberal	British Columbia	June 29, 1984	Trudeau	March 1, 1998	Resignation
Dan Hays	Liberal	Alberta	June 29, 1984	Trudeau	June 30, 2007	Resignation
Eymard Corbin	Liberal	New Brunswick	July 9, 1984	Turner	August 2, 2009	Retirement
Thomas Lefebvre	Liberal	Quebec	July 9, 1984	Turner	November 20, 1992	Death
Charles Turner	Liberal	Ontario	July 9, 1984	Turner	March 24, 1991	Retirement

=== Left Senate during the 32nd Parliament ===
Date	Name	Party	Representing	Details
March 31, 1980	Alexander Hamilton McDonald	Liberal	Saskatchewan	Death
April 17, 1980	Josie Alice Quart	Progressive Conservative	Quebec	Death
May 1, 1980	Paul Desruisseaux	Liberal	Quebec	Retirement
July 7, 1980	Donald Smith	Liberal	Nova Scotia	Resignation
July 23, 1980	Sarto Fournier	Liberal	Quebec	Death
September 29, 1980	J. Michel Fournier	Liberal	New Brunswick	Retirement
October 16, 1980	Margaret Norrie	Liberal	Nova Scotia	Retirement
October 25, 1980	Raymond Eudes	Liberal	Quebec	Death
March 6, 1981	Lionel Choquette	Progressive Conservative	Ontario	Resignation
June 18, 1981	Norman McLeod Paterson	Liberal	Ontario	Resignation
October 31, 1981	John Joseph Connolly	Liberal	Ontario	Resignation
December 13, 1981	Allister Grosart	Progressive Conservative	Ontario	Resignation
January 12, 1982	John Keith McBroom Laird	Liberal	Ontario	Retirement
May 4, 1982	Harry Hays	Liberal	Alberta	Death
October 7, 1982	Guy Williams	Liberal	British Columbia	Retirement
October 20, 1982	Carl Goldenberg	Liberal	Quebec	Retirement
December 19, 1982	George Isaac Smith	Progressive Conservative	Nova Scotia	Death
January 15, 1983	Florence Bird	Liberal	Ontario	Retirement
February 11, 1983	Edgar Fournier	Progressive Conservative	New Brunswick	Resignation
June 12, 1983	Maurice Lamontagne	Liberal	Quebec	Death
July 29, 1983	George McIlraith	Liberal	Ontario	Retirement
September 20, 1983	Ernest Manning	Social Credit	Alberta	Retirement
November 1, 1983	Salter Hayden	Liberal	Ontario	Resignation
December 15, 1983	Jean Marchand	Liberal	Quebec	Resignation

=== Changes in party affiliation during the 32nd Parliament ===
Date	Name	Party (subsequent)	Party (previous)	Details
May 20, 1982	Eric Cook	Independent	Liberal	

== See also ==
- List of current Canadian senators
