= List of senators in the 26th Parliament of Canada =

The following is a list of senators in the 26th Parliament of Canada.

Names in bold indicate senators in the 19th Canadian Ministry.

Name	Party	Province	Date appointed	Left office
John Black Aird	Liberal	Ontario	November 10, 1964	November 28, 1974
Walter Aseltine	Progressive Conservative	Saskatchewan	December 30, 1933	March 31, 1971
Alexander Boyd Baird	Liberal	Newfoundland and Labrador	August 17, 1949	November 23, 1967
Michael Basha	Liberal	Newfoundland and Labrador	January 24, 1951	November 18, 1976
Arthur-Lucien Beaubien	Liberal	Manitoba	January 29, 1940	February 1, 1969
Louis-Philippe Beaubien	Progressive Conservative	Quebec	November 16, 1960	March 28, 1985
Rhéal Bélisle	Progressive Conservative	Ontario	February 4, 1963	November 3, 1992
William Moore Benidickson	Liberal	Ontario	July 7, 1965	January 4, 1985
Charles Lawrence Bishop	Liberal	Ontario	April 18, 1945	September 23, 1966
Aristide Blais	Liberal	Alberta	January 29, 1940	November 10, 1964
Frederick Murray Blois	Progressive Conservative	Nova Scotia	January 14, 1960	October 12, 1976
William Albert Boucher	Liberal	Saskatchewan	January 3, 1957	June 23, 1976
Paul Henri Bouffard	Liberal	Quebec	December 27, 1946	February 16, 1966
Maurice Bourget	Liberal	Quebec	April 27, 1963	March 29, 1979
Romuald Bourque	Liberal	Quebec	July 6, 1963	August 14, 1974
Frederick Gordon Bradley	Liberal	Newfoundland and Labrador	June 12, 1953	March 30, 1966
Alfred Johnson Brooks	Progressive Conservative	New Brunswick	September 12, 1960	November 7, 1967
John Alexander Buchanan	Progressive Conservative	Alberta	January 15, 1959	October 2, 1965
George Percival Burchill	Liberal	New Brunswick	April 19, 1945	August 19, 1977
Donald Cameron	Independent liberal	Alberta	July 28, 1955	September 19, 1987
Gordon Peter Campbell	Liberal	Ontario	February 19, 1943	January 16, 1964
Lionel Choquette	Progressive Conservative	Ontario	January 31, 1958	March 6, 1981
Joseph William Comeau	Liberal	Nova Scotia	December 1, 1948	January 10, 1966
Harold Connolly	Liberal	Nova Scotia	July 28, 1955	May 14, 1979
**John Joseph Connolly**	Liberal	Ontario	June 12, 1953	October 31, 1981
Eric Cook	Liberal	Newfoundland and Labrador	February 14, 1964	July 26, 1984
Thomas Crerar	Liberal	Manitoba	April 18, 1945	May 31, 1966
David Croll	Liberal	Ontario	July 28, 1955	June 11, 1991
William Davies	Liberal	Ontario	November 19, 1942	March 11, 1967
Azellus Denis	Liberal	Quebec	February 3, 1964	September 4, 1991
Jean-Marie Dessureault	Liberal	Quebec	June 9, 1945	August 16, 1970
Mark Robert Drouin	Progressive Conservative	Quebec	October 4, 1957	October 12, 1963
Vincent Dupuis	Liberal	Quebec	April 18, 1945	May 11, 1967
Clarence Emerson	Progressive Conservative	New Brunswick	October 12, 1957	September 25, 1963
John Wallace de Beque Farris	Liberal	British Columbia	January 9, 1937	February 25, 1970
Muriel McQueen Fergusson	Liberal	New Brunswick	May 19, 1953	May 23, 1975
Jacques Flynn	Progressive Conservative	Quebec	November 9, 1962	August 22, 1990
Edgar Fournier	Progressive Conservative	New Brunswick	September 24, 1962	February 11, 1983
Sarto Fournier	Liberal	Quebec	June 12, 1953	July 23, 1980
Louis-Philippe Gélinas	Liberal	Quebec	June 11, 1963	December 10, 1975
Frederick William Gershaw	Liberal	Alberta	April 18, 1945	March 26, 1968
James Gladstone	Independent conservative	Alberta	January 31, 1958	March 31, 1971
Léon Mercier Gouin	Liberal	Quebec	November 7, 1940	March 18, 1976
Thomas Vincent Grant	Liberal	Prince Edward Island	June 25, 1949	August 19, 1965
Allister Grosart	Progressive Conservative	Ontario	September 24, 1962	December 13, 1981
James Campbell Haig	Progressive Conservative	Manitoba	June 15, 1962	December 29, 1977
Salter Hayden	Liberal	Ontario	February 9, 1940	November 1, 1983
John Gilbert Higgins	Progressive Conservative	Newfoundland and Labrador	January 15, 1959	July 1, 1963
John Hnatyshyn	Progressive Conservative	Saskatchewan	January 15, 1959	May 2, 1967
Nancy Hodges	Liberal	British Columbia	November 5, 1953	June 12, 1965
Malcolm Mercer Hollett	Progressive Conservative	Newfoundland and Labrador	October 6, 1961	March 31, 1971
Ralph Horner	Progressive Conservative	Saskatchewan	December 30, 1933	December 14, 1964
Charles Benjamin Howard	Liberal	Quebec	February 9, 1940	March 25, 1964
Adrian Knatchbull-Hugessen	Liberal	Quebec	January 12, 1937	January 1, 1967
Florence Elsie Inman	Liberal	Prince Edward Island	July 28, 1955	May 31, 1986
Olive Lillian Irvine	Progressive Conservative	Manitoba	January 14, 1960	November 1, 1969
Gordon Benjamin Isnor	Liberal	Nova Scotia	May 2, 1950	March 17, 1973
Mariana Beauchamp Jodoin	Liberal	Quebec	May 19, 1953	June 1, 1966
John James Kinley	Liberal	Nova Scotia	April 18, 1945	June 12, 1971
Norman Platt Lambert	Liberal	Ontario	January 20, 1938	November 4, 1965
Daniel Lang	Liberal	Ontario	February 14, 1964	June 13, 1994
J.-Eugène Lefrançois	Liberal	Quebec	April 25, 1957	November 5, 1976
Thomas D'Arcy Leonard	Liberal	Ontario	July 28, 1955	April 29, 1970
John Joseph MacDonald	Progressive Conservative	Prince Edward Island	January 27, 1958	April 20, 1971
John Michael Macdonald	Progressive Conservative	Nova Scotia	June 24, 1960	June 20, 1997
**William Ross Macdonald**	Liberal	Ontario	June 12, 1953	December 22, 1967
Duncan Kenneth MacTavish	Liberal	Ontario	June 11, 1963	November 15, 1963
Malcolm Wallace McCutcheon	Progressive Conservative	Ontario	August 9, 1962	May 13, 1968
Alexander Hamilton McDonald	Liberal	Saskatchewan	August 13, 1965	March 31, 1980
Frederic McGrand	Liberal	New Brunswick	July 28, 1955	January 22, 1988
Stanley McKeen	Liberal	British Columbia	January 27, 1947	December 1, 1966
Alexander Neil McLean	Liberal	New Brunswick	April 18, 1945	March 12, 1967
Léon Méthot	Progressive Conservative	Quebec	October 12, 1957	August 6, 1972
Hartland Molson	Independent	Quebec	July 28, 1955	May 31, 1993
Gustave Monette	Progressive Conservative	Quebec	October 12, 1957	December 23, 1969
Clement O'Leary	Progressive Conservative	Nova Scotia	September 25, 1962	June 12, 1969
Grattan O'Leary	Progressive Conservative	Ontario	September 24, 1962	April 7, 1976
Norman McLeod Paterson	Liberal	Ontario	February 9, 1940	June 18, 1981
Arthur Maurice Pearson	Progressive Conservative	Saskatchewan	October 12, 1957	March 31, 1971
Orville Howard Phillips	Progressive Conservative	Prince Edward Island	February 5, 1963	March 24, 1999
Jean-François Pouliot	Liberal	Quebec	July 28, 1955	June 28, 1968
Charles Gavan Power	Liberal	Quebec	July 28, 1955	May 30, 1968
Calvert Pratt	Liberal	Newfoundland and Labrador	January 24, 1951	November 13, 1963
Josie Alice Quart	Progressive Conservative	Quebec	November 16, 1960	April 17, 1980
Nelson Rattenbury	Liberal	New Brunswick	February 14, 1964	May 27, 1973
Donat Raymond	Liberal	Quebec	December 20, 1926	June 5, 1963
Thomas Reid	Liberal	British Columbia	September 7, 1949	October 14, 1967
John Alexander Robertson	Progressive Conservative	Ontario	November 29, 1962	February 19, 1965
Wishart McLea Robertson	Liberal	Nova Scotia	February 19, 1943	December 24, 1965
Arthur Roebuck	Liberal	Ontario	April 18, 1945	November 17, 1971
Calixte Savoie	Independent liberal	New Brunswick	July 28, 1955	August 23, 1970
Donald Smith	Liberal	Nova Scotia	July 28, 1955	July 7, 1980
Sydney John Smith	Liberal	British Columbia	January 3, 1957	December 31, 1968
Wesley Stambaugh	Liberal	Alberta	September 7, 1949	June 8, 1965
Joseph Albert Sullivan	Progressive Conservative	Ontario	October 12, 1957	February 18, 1985
Austin Claude Taylor	Liberal	New Brunswick	January 3, 1957	January 17, 1965
William Horace Taylor	Liberal	Ontario	April 18, 1945	June 1, 1966
Gunnar Thorvaldson	Progressive Conservative	Manitoba	January 29, 1958	August 2, 1969
Léonard Tremblay	Liberal	Quebec	June 12, 1953	September 2, 1965
James Gray Turgeon	Liberal	British Columbia	January 27, 1947	February 14, 1964
Cyrille Vaillancourt	Liberal	Quebec	March 3, 1944	January 3, 1969
Clarence Joseph Veniot	Liberal	New Brunswick	April 18, 1945	June 1, 1966
Thomas Vien	Liberal	Quebec	October 5, 1942	April 1, 1968
David James Walker	Progressive Conservative	Ontario	February 4, 1963	September 30, 1989
Frank Corbett Welch	Progressive Conservative	Nova Scotia	September 25, 1962	July 14, 1975
George Stanley White	Progressive Conservative	Ontario	September 20, 1957	November 17, 1972
Harry Albert Willis	Progressive Conservative	Ontario	June 15, 1962	March 23, 1972
Thomas Harold Wood	Liberal	Saskatchewan	January 25, 1949	November 26, 1965
Allan Lee Woodrow	Liberal	Ontario	May 19, 1953	March 15, 1966
Paul Yuzyk	Progressive Conservative	Manitoba	February 4, 1963	July 9, 1986

== See also ==
- List of current senators of Canada
