= Charles Bishop =

Charles Bishop may refer to:

- Charles Reed Bishop (1822–1915), Hawaiian businessman
- Charles Francis Bishop (1888–1954), US Navy Medal of Honor recipient
- Charles Bishop (cricketer) (1879–1943), English cricketer
- Charles A. Bishop (1854–1908), politician and jurist in the State of Iowa
- Charles E. Bishop (1921–2012), authority in the field of agricultural economics and president of the University of Arkansas
- Charles F. Bishop (1844–1913), mayor of the city of Buffalo, New York
- Charles Lawrence Bishop (1876–1966), Canadian journalist and politician
- Charles Pleasant Bishop (1854–1941), American businessman and politician
- Charles Bishop (Alabama politician), Alabama senator fl. 1983–present
- Charles M. Bishop (1862–1949), American academic administrator
- Charles Bishop (1986–2002), suicide pilot of the 2002 Tampa Cessna 172 crash
- Charlie Bishop (baseball) (1924–1993), Major League Baseball player
- Charlie Bishop (footballer) (born 1968), English former footballer
- Charles Bishop (Home and Away), a fictional character on the Australian soap opera Home and Away

== See also ==
- Charles Bishop Weyland, a fictional character in the film Alien vs. Predator
