= Katimavik =

Canada volunteer service organization

- Formation: January 26, 1977; 49 years ago
- Type: Registered charity
- Purpose: Youth education through residential volunteerism
- Headquarters: 3500 boul. De Maisonneuve Ouest Westmount, Québec, Canada H3Z 3C1
- Region served: Canada
- Official language: English and French
- CEO: John-Frederick Cameron
- Volunteers: > 36,000 (as of January 2020)
- Website: www.katimavik.org
- Formerly called: OPCAN

Katimavik (Inuktitut: ᑲᑎᒪᕕᒃ "meeting place") is a registered charity that engages Canadian youth through volunteer work. Katimavik provides opportunities for young Canadians to participate in five to six-month periods of community service throughout the country via the National Experience program. It was founded in 1977 by Canada World Youth founder and future senator Jacques Hébert and national defence minister Barney Danson. It is currently led by John-Frederick Cameron.

== Overview ==
The Katimavik National Experience consists of groups of 11 youths, aged 17 to 25, who come from across Canada. They travel together to two different places in Canada for a period of five to six months. During the 2018-19 program year, Katimavik had 198 participants spread across six communities: Nanaimo, BC; Calgary, AB; Winnipeg, MB; Sudbury, ON; Quebec City, QC; and Moncton, NB. Each youth volunteers for at least 30 hours per week and completes a learning program that focuses on Truth and Reconciliation, Canada's official languages, eco-stewardship, leadership, cultural diversity, and healthy living. Each year, over 500 community non-profit organizations are assisted by Katimavik Participants doing full-time work for them. Katimavik has had volunteer projects in all 10 Canadian provinces and three territories. Katimavik has signed partnerships with a number of post-secondary institutions in Canada, including Vancouver Island University, Capilano University, Quebec's public community colleges (CEGEP), Trent University, and George Brown College in order for Katimavik participants to receive post-secondary credit for their experiences.

Katimavik currently has its national headquarters in Westmount, Quebec.

== History ==
Katimavik was started by Pierre Trudeau's federal administration under the responsibility of Canada World Youth founder Jacques Hébert and then-Minister of National Defence Barney Danson. Legally, it was incorporated as OPCAN, a non-profit corporation created by letters patent dated January 26, 1977, pursuant to Part II of the Canada Business Corporations Act. Much of Katimavik's structure was taken from Canadian Cadet Organizations and the defunct Company of Young Canadians. In 1977 had a full military option for one year different than the civilian option at the time . In the 1980s Katimavik offered a military option, an opportunity to spend three months on an Army or Navy base learning fundamental skills such as first aid and map reading, as well as basic military skills, such as drills and rifle handling.

The overall program grew quickly in its initial years to its peak in 1985–86, when it engaged over 5,000 participants. The program was cancelled that year by Brian Mulroney's new government.

The cancellation prompted founder Jacques Hébert to undertake a 21-day hunger strike in protest, to no avail. He subsequently worked with Quebec region director Claude Raiche to continue Katimavik as an outdoor recreation training centre at Notre-Dame-de-l'Île-Perrot.

It continued in this form until 1994 when Youth Service Canada helped Katimavik to form a pilot program involving six projects and 66 participants. The next year, the Government of Canada's Department of Heritage provided the program with ongoing funding and the number of projects and youth tripled. The program then continued to grow; during the 2005-2006 program year there were 1,155 participants in 105 communities across Canada. In 2008, Katimavik was granted consultative status at the United Nations Economic and Social Council, which has allowed Katimavik to liaise with similar organizations in other countries and represent Canada internationally.

In 2006, Katimavik was told by the government that its funding was under review and that it was to cease recruitment activities. A letter-writing campaign was organized by Katimavik and funding levels were maintained until October 2010 when the government announced three-year funding in the sum of $15 million per year, a reduction from its previous funding levels ($19.7 million).

== Current leadership ==
Katimavik is currently led by John-Frederick Cameron, an experienced executive in the non-profit and charitable sectors. Cameron was appointed to the position in November 2019. His stated objectives are to increase Katimavik's visibility, broaden and improve the National Experience, and diversify the organization's programming and funding sources.

== Program life ==
Participants volunteer at least 30 hours a week and engage in workshops and activities with their fellow group members and project leader. Three groups in close communities form a "cluster" that may often meet up together for certain activities. Each cluster of four projects is monitored by a project coordinator.

During the program, participants can expect to abide by certain standards of behaviour which fall into four main categories: participation, health and safety, and respect. Participants are monitored by their project leader, who resides in-house and supports the project. Project leaders can issue verbal warnings, commitments to improve, final warnings, and expulsions if the behavioural standards are not followed.

Participants receive four letters of appraisal (2 from the project leaders, and 2 from work supervisors), as well as a certificate of completion upon finishing the program.

While participants are in the program, they will spend a week of their time in each community living with a "host family". This is a family living in the community that has agreed to take on a participant (or two). This allows the participant to take some time off from group life, while living with members of the community, and learning what it's like to be a local.

Each group, every three months, is given budgets of varying amounts for groceries, activities, and transportation. This money is spent in ways that correspond to program's learning objectives. The goal of the program's educational component is to build the capacities of participants in the following key areas:

- Interact with others in a variety of situations
- Adopt an open attitude towards the diversity of social and multicultural realities
- Communicate in both official languages
- Engage in diverse work experiences
- Apply habits that favour a healthy lifestyle
- Develop an integrated vision of environmental protection and sustainable development
- Engage as a citizen
- Prepare to integrate, as a citizen, into the job market, school or other life event

== Katimavik elimination ==
In the 2012 Canadian federal budget, Prime Minister Stephen Harper announced that the program would be eliminated due to its comparatively high per-person cost of the program when compared to other government youth initiatives.

== 2018 relaunch ==
In 2018, Katimavik was relaunched through the newly created Canada Service Corps, a youth service initiative launched by the Government of Canada with the aim of engaging youth in community service across the country.
