= Joseph Russell (shipbuilder) =

Joseph Russell (August 17, 1786 – March 10, 1855) was a Scottish-born businessman and shipbuilder in New Brunswick, Canada.

He was born in Clackmannan, Clackmannanshire, the son of Thomas Russell. He joined the Royal Navy at a young age. In 1819, he married Ann Agnes Hunter at Chatham, New Brunswick. Russell owned a number of buildings in Chatham, including a hotel. He helped establish the Chatham Fire Company in 1824. In 1827, he began building ships. In 1831, a fire destroyed several of his buildings and, in 1832, he purchased a shipyard in Chatham from Francis Peabody. In 1839, he sold that property to Joseph Cunard and moved his operation to Beaubears Island. Russell hired John Harley as his shipbuilder and George Burchill as general manager for his shipyard. In 1837, with other businessman, he made an unsuccessful attempt to establish the Bank of Miramichi. Russell served as overseer of the poor for Chatham and also later for Nelson parish.

Originally an Anglican, Russell and his family became Mormons around 1841. In 1846, he offered the use of one of his ships to British Mormons wishing to travel to the Salt Lake Valley but the plan fell through when the church in Britain decided against financing the trip. In 1850, he sold his business to Harley and Burchill and moved to the Utah Territory. He helped finance the Deseret Manufacturing Company, intended to produce beet sugar, but this company was not successful. Russell died in Salt Lake City, Utah at the age of 68.

On October 15, 2005, a historical panel was erected on Beaubears Island, giving an overview of Russell's life and his connections to Beaubears Island and the Mormon faith. The panel was commissioned jointly by Parks Canada, the Mormon Historic Sites Foundation, and Friends Of Beaubears Island Inc.

== See also ==
- The Church of Jesus Christ of Latter-day Saints (LDS Church)
