= John Percival Burchill =

Canadian politician

John Percival "J.P." Burchill (February 6, 1855 – December 18, 1923) was a merchant and political figure in New Brunswick, Canada. He represented Northumberland County in the Legislative Assembly of New Brunswick from 1883 to 1886, from 1887 to 1903 and from 1908 to 1912 as a Liberal member.

He was born in Miramichi, New Brunswick, the son of George Burchill, an Irish-born lumber merchant, and Bridget Percival. With his brother, George Jr., he joined his father's firm in 1881. In 1882, he married Eliza Bacon Wilkinson. He served as a member of the council for Northumberland County from 1878 to 1882, serving as county warden in 1882. Burchill was defeated in a bid for reelection to the provincial assembly in 1886 but then was elected in an 1887 by-election held after Michael Adams ran for a seat in the federal parliament. He served as speaker for the legislative assembly from 1893 to 1899. He was defeated in 1903. In 1904, he took over the operation of the company when his father retired from business. Burchill was also president of the Miramichi Steam Navigation Company and helped found the Miramichi River Service Limited which succeeded it. He was a prominent Freemason and a past master of the Sons of Temperance. He died in Newcastle at the age of 68.

His son George Percival later became president of George Burchill and Sons and went on to serve in the Canadian senate.
