= Ted Workman =

Canadian Football League executive (1931–2020)

- Born: Mark Edward Workman; December 30, 1931; Montreal, Quebec, Canada
- Died: August 13, 2020 (aged 88); Grand Cayman
- Occupation(s): CFL executive, owner
- Title: Interim Commissioner of the Canadian Football League
- Term: 1967
- Predecessor: Keith Davey
- Successor: Allan McEachern

Mark Edward "Ted" Workman (born December 30, 1931–August 13, 2020) was a financial advisor and former owner of the Montreal Alouettes of the Canadian Football League.

== Early life ==
Workman graduated from Bishop's College School and Lower Canada College. He left McGill University before graduation to manage his family's investments business.

== Business career ==
Workman worked as a manager selection and asset allocation advisor for large institutional investors, including pension funds, university endowments, cooperatives, and retirement funds. He was the founder and developer of Performex, a proprietary investment analytical system used by Andina Family Offices, a United States financial advisory firm. Workman later served as an asset allocation and portfolio structuring consultant for Andina.

== Montreal Alouettes ==
Workman purchased controlling interest in the Montreal Alouettes in 1954 with minority owner Léo Dandurand remaining as team president. Workman replaced Dandurand as team president after the 1957 season and in 1965, he took on the additional responsibility of general manager. The Alouettes had a 50-71-5 record during Workman's tenure as team president and never finished above third place in the Interprovincial Rugby Football Union/Eastern Football Conference. He stepped down as team president in 1966, but remained the Alouettes principal owner until he was bought out by Joe Atwell in 1967.

On February 23, 1967, Workman was named interim commissioner of the Canadian Football League. He was replaced by Allan McEachern before the end of the year.
