= George Burchill =

- Born: May 8, 1820; Bandon, County Cork, Ireland
- Died: June 18, 1907 (aged 87); Nelson, New Brunswick
- Occupations: shipbuilder, lumberman and merchant

George Burchill (May 8, 1820 – June 18, 1907) was a shipbuilder, lumberman and merchant in New Brunswick.

He was born in Bandon, County Cork, Ireland, the son of Thomas Burchill and Catherine Murphy, and came to New Brunswick with his parents in 1826. He found work as a clerk in a store in Chatham. Burchill was hired as a clerk by Joseph Russell and went on to become business manager for Russell's shipyard. In 1849, he married Bridget Percival. In 1850, with John Harley and aided by financial assistance from Rankin, Gilmour and Company, he purchased the shipyard from Russell. The partners also traded in lumber and owned a general store. In 1857, the partnership was dissolved and Burchill set up a lumber and retail business in Nelson. His logs were processed at a sawmill owned by Charles Sargeant from 1868 to 1875, when Burchill purchased the operation. In 1881, he established the company George Burchill and Sons, with his sons John Percival and George Jr. He retired in 1904, and died 3 years later.
