= Joe Atwell =

Canadian-American sports team owner and businessman

W. M. "Joe" Atwell (August 25, 1919 – December 13, 1988) was a construction investor and builder who was the co-owner of the Montreal Alouettes from 1965–1967 and sole owner from 1967–1969.

Originally from Hamilton, Ontario, Atwell constructed and sold upscale homes in Highland Beach, Florida and Boca Raton, Florida. In 1965, he purchased 50% of Ted Workman's shares in the Alouettes and became the team's chairman. On November 13, 1967, Atwell became the sole owner of the Alouettes. Under Atwell's sole ownership, the Alouetes never won more than 3 games in a season and missed the playoffs each year. On December 9, 1969 it was announced that Ottawa attorney Sam Berger had purchased the club from Atwell for upwards of US$1.2 million.

Atwell died of heart failure on December 13, 1988 at his home in Boca Raton.
