= Chatham Head, New Brunswick =

Human settlement in New Brunswick, Canada

Chatham Head
- Neighbourhood
- Interactive map of Chatham Head
- Country: Canada
- Province: New Brunswick
- County: Northumberland County
- City: Nelson-Miramichi
- Time zone: UTC−4 (AST)
  - Summer (DST): UTC−3 (ADT)
- Area code(s): 506, 428

Chatham Head is a neighbourhood in the city of Miramichi, New Brunswick. It is located on the south side of the Miramichi River, approximately 3.7 kilometres (2.3 mi) north of Nelson-Miramichi. Notable areas found in the community are the Chatham Head Church, the Chatham Head Recreation & Community Centre, and the Waldo Henderson Memorial Field - home of the Chatham Head Tigers.

== See also ==
- List of neighbourhoods in Miramichi, New Brunswick
