= Lily Butters =

Canadian activist (1894–1980)

Lily Esther Butters OC (March 5, 1894 – June 3, 1980) was a Canadian youth disability activist.

== Biography ==
Butters was born on March 5, 1894 in Newcastle upon Tyne. On August 1, 1914, she married John William Butters. During World War I, John served in the Royal Northumberland Fusiliers. After returning in 1918, they had a son James Atkins. On May 20, 1929, they moved to Austin, Quebec to escape poverty in England. The Great Depression and her children serving in World War II caused her health to deteriorate. She enrolled in a nursing a class in Montreal.

Butters founded the Cecil Butters Memorial Hospital, or the Butters Centre, in her farmhouse, which cared for mentally disabled children. It was named in honour of her son, Cecil. In 1968, it had 325 occupants. It operated from 1947 to 1990. After her husband died on February 2, 1964, a new building for her hospital was constructed after receiving $230,000 in funding from senator Paul Desruisseaux.

On June 23, 1972, she was made an Officer of the Order of Canada.
