= Armand Daigle =

Canadian politician

The Honourable Armand Daigle

Senator for Mille Isles, Quebec division
- In office 3 March 1944 – 8 March 1957
- Appointed by: William Lyon Mackenzie King
- Preceded by: Jules-Édouard Prévost
- Succeeded by: Gustave Monette

Personal details
- Born: 16 May 1892 Saint-Roch, Quebec, Canada
- Died: 8 March 1957 (aged 64) Miami, Florida, U.S.
- Party: Liberal
- Spouse: Élizabeth Brault
- Profession: Businessman

Armand Daigle (16 May 1892 – 8 March 1957) was a Canadian Liberal party member of the Senate of Canada. He was born in Saint-Roch, Quebec and became a businessman.

The son of Théodore Daigle and Célina Collette, he was educated in Sorel. In 1915, he married Élizabeth Brault. Daigle was a director of a number of companies, including Sun Trust Ltd., Montreal Life Insurance Company, Windsor Hotel Ltd. and RCA Victor Company Ltd.

He was appointed to the Senate by Prime Minister William Lyon Mackenzie King on 3 March 1944 for the Mille Isles, Quebec division. He remained in that role until his death on 8 March 1957.
