= Renaude Lapointe =

Canadian journalist and Senator (1912-2002)

The Honourable Louise Marguerite Renaude Lapointe PC, CC

Speaker of the Senate
- In office 12 September 1974 – 4 October 1979
- Prime Minister: Pierre Trudeau
- Preceded by: Muriel McQueen Fergusson
- Succeeded by: Allister Grosart

Senator for Mille Isles, Quebec
- In office 1971–1987
- Appointed by: Pierre Trudeau
- Preceded by: Thérèse Casgrain
- Succeeded by: Solange Chaput-Rolland

Personal details
- Born: January 3, 1912 Disraeli, Quebec, Canada
- Died: May 11, 2002 (aged 90) Ottawa, Ontario, Canada
- Party: Liberal

Louise Marguerite Renaude Lapointe, PC CC (January 3, 1912 – May 11, 2002) was a Canadian journalist and a Senator. She was among the first Canadian women to work as a professional journalist and the first French-Canadian woman to preside over the Senate.

Born in Disraeli, Quebec the daughter of Joseph-Alphonse Lapointe and Marie-Louise Poulin, she worked as a journalist in the 1940s and 1950s at Le Soleil in Quebec City. In 1959 she joined the staff of Montreal's La Presse.

A member of the Liberal Party of Canada, she was appointed to the Senate in 1971 by Pierre Trudeau and served until her retirement in 1987. From September 12, 1974 until October 4, 1979, she was Speaker of the Senate. She was also Speaker pro tempore from June 9, 1982 until November 30, 1983.

In 1989, she was invested as a Companion of the Order of Canada.

== Early life and family ==
Lapointe was born in Disraeli, in Wolfe County, Quebec. She was the eldest of three siblings (one girl, two boys), born in successive years. Her father, initially a mechanic, owned the first automobile garage in the area and had a natural talent for mechanics despite limited formal education. He was also a gifted amateur musician, playing the trumpet excellently and leading the village orchestra and band, earning the local title "Professor Lapointe". He aimed for political neutrality to maintain clients from different political sides.

Her mother was a qualified teacher who had aspirations to teach out West but remained in Disraeli. Described by Lapointe as very bright and "avant-garde", she handled the accounting for the family garage and wrote correspondence. She was politically aware, reportedly writing speeches for the local legislative deputy, and was a strong supporter of women's suffrage, although likely unable to exercise the right to vote herself due to illness before her death.

The Lapointe household had a strong musical environment. Renaude studied piano and violin, while her brother Christian played the saxophone and brother Carol played the cello. The family sometimes played together in a small home orchestra. Her brother Christian was considered exceptionally bright, later winning the prestigious Prince of Wales Prize during his studies.

In 1933, during the Great Depression, the family moved to Quebec City due to economic difficulties and her father's business struggles with an invention, a logging tool named "Champion". Both of Lapointe's parents died in 1943 – her mother from a cerebral hemorrhage in April and her father from angina in December.

== Education ==
Lapointe attended the local convent school in Disraeli, run by the Sisters of the Holy Names of Jesus and Mary, until the age of 12 or 13. She was considered academically advanced but could not receive her diploma early due to age requirements. Around age 13, she experienced fainting spells, which led to a convent school offering classical studies rejecting her application due to concerns about managing her health.

Her parents subsequently sent her to the Ursulines convent boarding school in Stanstead, near the US border, where she studied from 1925 to 1929. There, she completed higher studies, learned English, undertook commercial studies, and earned a license in music, specializing in piano and violin. She recalled enjoying her time there but felt the pedagogy could have been stronger. During her school years, she only returned home from the boarding school for Christmas and the summer holidays. She had aspirations for university studies, but the family's financial situation during the Depression and her lack of the standard prerequisite baccalaureate made this difficult.

== Career ==
=== Early career ===
After moving to Quebec City with her family in 1933, Lapointe spent several years searching for work amidst the severe economic conditions of the Depression. She eventually secured a position as a secretary at the law firm Guérard et Pelland, earning $6 per week. She worked there for four and a half years. Her musical knowledge was reportedly a factor in her hiring, as the firm needed assistance with a case involving the Prix d'Europe music competition. Lapointe demonstrated initiative in the role, such as proactively managing debt collection correspondence for the firm. She contributed most of her earnings to her family.

=== Journalism ===
==== Le Soleil (c. 1939–1959) ====
Lapointe initially applied unsuccessfully for a position at the Quebec City newspaper Le Soleil. Approximately four and a half years after starting her secretarial job, she was hired by the newspaper with the assistance of a friend, Germaine Bondock, who already worked there. Lapointe initially felt intimidated but quickly began covering a wide array of subjects, including women's features, advice columns, and critiques of music, theatre, and art exhibitions. Her very first assignment was a review of Jacques Offenbach's operetta La Périchole.

She gradually transitioned into political reporting, covering events like the Liberal Women's Club of Quebec and politicians such as Jean Lesage. Under the pseudonym "Carole", she wrote a column for Le Canadien Libéral, a provincial Liberal party weekly publication. A lifelong Liberal, she recalled causing a stir when she wrote an article critical of Premier Adélard Godbout's policy requiring margarine to be uncolored to distinguish it from butter; the dispute was eventually resolved amicably.

==== Time Magazine Correspondent ====
While still employed at Le Soleil, Lapointe became the Quebec correspondent for Time magazine, succeeding Roger Lemelin and Cyrille Fecteau. This freelance work required significant effort, often involving late nights preparing and filing reports via telegraph. She covered the government of Maurice Duplessis extensively for Time, noting the magazine's strong opposition to him. She recounted having to discreetly attend Duplessis's press conferences, sometimes positioning herself at the back of the room, to gather direct quotes required by the magazine, noting that Duplessis acknowledged her presence silently.

==== Other work during Le Soleil years ====
During her time at Le Soleil, Lapointe also took on other writing assignments. She wrote unsigned editorials for Joseph Barnard, the editor of Le Soleil's sister publication, L'Événement. Additionally, she wrote humorous scripts for the CHRC radio station program "Rigolons" and prepared texts for television biographies of notable men, based on interviews she conducted.

==== Departure from Le Soleil ====
Lapointe left Le Soleil in 1959, just one month shy of completing 20 years of service. Her departure followed a conflict with the newspaper's director, M. Mercier. The conflict arose after Mercier discovered her work for Time (which he disliked intensely) from a Time representative during a flight and ordered her to cease the collaboration. The situation escalated when Lapointe was passed over for an invitation to a press trip to Antigua, with the invitation being given to another staff member by Mercier. Feeling slighted, Lapointe resigned. Because she left just before her 20th anniversary, she only received her own contributions back from the pension fund, forfeiting the employer's share.

==== La Presse and Le Nouveau Journal (1959 onwards) ====
Immediately upon resigning from Le Soleil, Lapointe contacted Jean-Louis Gagnon, a former colleague who was then reorganizing La Presse in Montreal, and was promptly hired. She found the move to Montreal exciting and was warmly welcomed by former colleagues from Quebec City who had already joined La Presse. Lapointe, along with Adèle Lauzon who was hired the same day, were pioneers as the first women reporters integrated into the general newsroom at La Presse, previously an all-male domain separate from the women's pages staff. She contributed various pieces, including humorous columns for the editorial page.

Lapointe covered major developments during Quebec's Quiet Revolution, including education reforms like the creation of CEGEPs, and reported on hospitals and the Université de Montréal. She covered the period following Duplessis's death, including the brief premiership of Paul Sauvé just before his sudden death.

Lapointe briefly worked at Le Nouveau Journal, a short-lived Montreal daily founded in 1961 by Angelina Berthiaume-du Tremblay (of the La Presse ownership family) as a rival to La Presse after a family dispute.

==== Major investigations ====
While at Le Nouveau Journal, Lapointe undertook a major, secretly prepared, month-long investigative series into the circumstances surrounding the controversial 1950 resignation and subsequent exile of Joseph Charbonneau, the Archbishop of Montreal. The investigation required extensive travel, including trips to Charbonneau's hometown in Ontario, Ottawa, Victoria (where Charbonneau lived in exile), Rome, and Madrid (to interview the former Apostolic Nuncio Ildebrando Antoniutti). The series, published in late 1961 to coincide with the anniversary of Charbonneau's death, significantly boosted the struggling newspaper's circulation. It was later published as a book, L'histoire de Monseigneur Charbonneau, by Jacques Hébert's Éditions du Jour. Despite the series' impact, Le Nouveau Journal folded soon after when Mme. du Tremblay withdrew her financial support. Lapointe noted she never received royalties for the book, which sold tens of thousands of copies, due to the publisher's financial difficulties at the time, but she maintained a friendship with Hébert, later acting as his sponsor when he was appointed to the Senate.

After the demise of Le Nouveau Journal, Lapointe returned to La Presse. Initially assigned to the women's pages, she was soon tasked by editor Gérard Pelletier and managing editor Fernand Lévesque (brother of René Lévesque) to write a major series on the proposed nationalization of electricity companies in Quebec. Titled "Le Colosse en Marche" (The Colossus on the March), the 13-part series involved interviews with the heads of the various private power companies targeted for takeover, such as Shawinigan Water & Power Company and Gatineau Power. The series was highly acclaimed, subsequently published as a brochure by the newly expanded Hydro-Québec, and earned praise from René Lévesque, then Quebec's Minister of Natural Resources and the driving force behind nationalization. Lapointe recalled Lévesque's strong approval at the time, but noted a later encounter where Lévesque, having founded the Parti Québécois, called her "irretrievable" ('irrécupérable') for not supporting Quebec sovereignty.

== Political views ==
Lapointe identified as a Liberal throughout her life, influenced by her family background. She wrote columns for a Liberal publication early in her career. However, her journalistic work required covering politicians across the spectrum, including figures like Maurice Duplessis, whom her employers at Time magazine strongly opposed. Her later interaction with René Lévesque highlighted her opposition to Quebec sovereignty.

== Personal life ==
Lapointe had musical talents, playing both piano and violin from a young age. She developed a lifelong love for air travel after her first flight in 1927. She described herself as shy in person but bold and direct in her writing. She never married. After her parents' death in 1943, she lived briefly with a friend before getting her own apartment on Rue MacMahon in Quebec City, later living on Stanley Street upon moving to Montreal.
