= Canada World Youth =

Canadian non-profit organization

Canada World Youth (CWY, in French: Jeunesse Canada Monde, JCM) was an international non-profit organization dedicated to providing youth with a voluntary opportunity to learn about other communities, cultures and people while developing leadership and communications skills.

Founded in 1971 by Jacques Hébert (1923–2007) a former Canadian senator and lifelong promoter of youth and international development programs, Canada World Youth has sent over 50,000 youth volunteers in 69 countries worldwide to participate in its programs. The organization is currently in the process of winding down operations.

== Save CWY/JCM ==
Save Canada World Youth is a grassroots movement initiated by alumni of the Canada World Youth/Jeunesse Canada Monde (CWY/JCM) program, which is a non-profit organization that focuses on providing international volunteer and exchange opportunities for Canadian youth. The movement was formed in response to the Canadian government's decision to significantly cut funding for the CWY/JCM program in 2012. The alumni believe that the CWY program has had a significant impact on the lives of Canadian youth and the communities they serve around the world and that it is an important tool for promoting cross-cultural understanding and global citizenship. The Save Canada World Youth movement aims to raise awareness about the value of the CWY program and to encourage the Canadian government to reinstate funding to ensure its continued success. The movement has organized various campaigns, including a petition on Change.org, social media campaigns, and outreach to Canadian parliamentarians and decision-makers, to draw attention to the importance of the CWY program and the need to secure its future.

== Canada World Youth Demise ==
Due to COVID-19 and political factors, the youth program was discontinued to the dismay and heartbreak of alumni in 2022.

== Former programs ==
- Women's Entrepreneur & Leadership Initiative
- EQWIP Hubs in partnership with YCI International Inc.
- Global Learner Programs
- Pathways to Indigenous Youth Leadership
- Mentorship Program
- Youth Leaders in Action
- Québec sans frontières
- CWY Student Network
- Youth Exchange Program

== Partner countries since 1971 ==
=== Antilles and America ===
- Belize
- Bolivia
- Brazil
- Chile
- Colombia
- Costa Rica
- Cuba
- Dominica
- Dominican Republic
- El Salvador
- Ecuador
- United States
- Grenada
- Guatemala
- Guyana
- Haiti
- Honduras
- Jamaica
- Mexico
- Nicaragua
- Panama
- Peru
- Saint Lucia
- Trinidad and Tobago
- Uruguay
- Venezuela

=== Asia ===
- Bangladesh
- China
- India
- Indonesia
- Malaysia
- Mongolia
- Nepal
- Pakistan
- Philippines
- Sri Lanka
- Thailand
- Vietnam
- Yemen

=== Africa ===
- South Africa
- Benin
- Botswana
- Burkina Faso
- Cameroon
- Egypt
- The Gambia
- Ghana
- Ivory Coast
- Kenya
- Malawi
- Mali
- Maroc
- Mozambique
- Namibia
- Rwanda
- Senegal
- Somalia
- Tanzania
- Togo
- Chad
- Tunisia

=== Central and East Europe ===
- Estonia
- Hungary
- Poland
- Russia
- Ukraine
- Yugoslavia

=== Oceania ===
- Fiji
