= Charles Bishop (cricketer) =

English cricketer

Personal information
- Full name: Charles Frederick Bishop
- Born: 19 August 1879; Down End, Horsley, Gloucestershire, England
- Died: 27 October 1943 (aged 64); Stonehouse, Plymouth, Devon, England

Domestic team information
- Years: Team
- 1920–1921: Somerset

Career statistics
Competition	FC
Matches	2
Runs scored	9
Batting average	3.00
100s/50s	0/0
Top score	3*
Catches/stumpings	0/–
- Source: CricketArchive, 22 December 2015

Charles Frederick Bishop (19 August 1879 – 27 October 1943) played first-class cricket for Somerset in 1920 and 1921. He was born in Down End, Horsley, Gloucestershire, and died at Stonehouse, Plymouth, Devon.

Bishop played in just two first-class matches for Somerset as a middle-order batsman, one in each of the 1920 and 1921 seasons. Though he was never out without scoring, he was not successful, making in all only nine runs in four first-class innings, with a highest of an undefeated 3 in the 1920 match against Leicestershire.
