= Nelson-Miramichi, New Brunswick =

Area of Miramichi, New Brunswick, Canada

Coordinates: 46.9810°N 65.5475°W

Nelson-Miramichi is a suburban neighbourhood in the city of Miramichi, New Brunswick, Canada.

Prior to municipal amalgamation on January 1, 1995, Nelson-Miramichi was an incorporated village in Northumberland County and one of the oldest European settlements in the Miramichi Valley.

Earl J. English's history of the community, titled Nelson and Its Neighbours: 300 Years on the Miramichi, published in 1987, lists it as "one of the oldest settlements on the Miramichi. It goes back to the time of William Davidson (lumberman)." English wrote that "According to J. L. O'Brien, the Parish of Nelson was first known as Dower's Settlement, Southwest."

Communities amalgamated in 1995 to form the City of Miramichi, New Brunswick

== History ==
Federal census population history of Nelson Miramichi
Year	Pop.	±%
1971	1,580	—
1976	1,543	−2.3%
1981	1,452	−5.9%
1986	1,407	−3.1%
1991	1,387	−1.4%
Source: Statistics Canada

The community of Nelson took its name after Admiral Lord Nelson of the Royal Navy who died at the Battle of Trafalgar. English notes that there is a "legend that the spars for Lord Nelson's flagship Victory came from the Miramichi. There were some men from Nelson who sailed with Lord Nelson: Joseph Russell who was midshipman at the Battle of the Nile on HMS Vanguard (1787)."

English quotes historian William Francis Ganong as saying that an early Recollect Mission originally thought to have been establish at Burnt Church was actually at Nelson around 1686.

The history of Nelson is closely tied to that of Beaubears Island directly across from the heart of Nelson. The island was used as an encampment by Boieshebert whose followers set up while fleeing the English after the expulsion of the Acadians. They camped there while heading for Quebec.

Later the island, which takes its name from Boieshebert misspelled in English form, was used extensively for shipbuilding.

By 1875, George Burchill and Sons had become extremely influential in the lumbering business and were a mainstay in the village almost to the present. In 1882 Harvey Flett established a brick yard, which was later run by the Loggies until 1932.

Over the years there were a number of families who were involved in lumbering and logging. Nelson also had a woolen mill, carding mill, a tannery, schools churches, stores, post office, ferries, tugboats, a railroad connection, Beaubear's Co-op Store, fire-hall, village office, rec center, outdoor skating rink, two softball fields and a large modern papermill.

John James Fraser who was born on Beaubear's Island became Lieutenant-Governor in 1893, and in the late 1940s and early 50s Joseph Leonard O'Brien also became Lieutenant-Governor of the province. G. Percival Burchill was a member of the Senate of Canada. Paul Dawson became a provincial Cabinet Minister during the administration of premier Richard Hatfield.

Located on S side of the Miramichi River, 3.71 km S of Chatham Head: Nelson Parish and Chatham Parish, Northumberland County: PO Nelson 1842-1868: in 1871 Nelson had a population of 600: in 1898 Nelson was a station on the Canada Eastern Railway and a farming, lumbering and fishing community with 8 stores, 1 hotel, 2 sawmills, 1 tannery, 1 carding mill, 1 barrel parts factory, 1 brick kiln, 3 churches and a population of 600: included the settlement of South Nelson: PO 1853-1968: in 1866 South Nelson was a farming and lumbering community with 33 resident families: included the community of South Nelson Road: PO South Nelson Road 1883-1947: PO Nelson-Miramichi from 1968: included the community of Nowlanville, located 8 km SE of Newcastle, where Patrick Nowlan, James Nowlan and Michael Nowlan were early settlers.

Prior to Miramichi amalgamation, Nelson was officially known as Nelson-Miramichi. It first incorporated as a village in 1967 with Byron Goodin as its first Mayor. At that time its population was between 1,500 and 2,000.

== Modern Nelson ==
The community, while considered a suburban neighbourhood in Miramichi, is largely rural. It is a predominantly Roman Catholic Community. From Nelson's banks one can overlook Beaubears Island, a National Historic Site of Canada. An Interpretive Center and Museum located in Nelson's Bicentennial Park provide a history of the shipbuilding industry on the island. Guided tours, with live reenactments, are available for those who wish to cross the Miramichi River and explore the island.

In 2005, the Nelson Softball Association hosted the Midget Canadian Boys Fast Pitch Championships. Local players representing Team New Brunswick included Jake O'Neil(3B), Ashley Cosgrove(P), and Thomas McCarthy(C). Tournament Games were held at both the Gerald King Memorial Field and the Merle Doyle Jr. Memorial Field.

Today, Nelson still maintains its history as part of the city of Miramichi. It is a picturesque community on the south shore of the Miramichi River with its elegant older homes and two-spired St. Patrick's Church.
