= Jacques Hébert (Canadian politician) =

Canadian politician from Quebec

The Honourable Jacques Hébert OC

Senator from Quebec
- In office April 20, 1983 – June 21, 1998
- Appointed by: Pierre Trudeau
- Preceded by: Paul Desruisseaux
- Succeeded by: Aurélien Gill

Personal details
- Born: June 21, 1923 Montreal, Quebec, Canada
- Died: December 6, 2007 (aged 84) Montreal, Quebec, Canada
- Party: Liberal
- Committees: Chairman, Special Committee on Youth (1983–1986); Chairman, Special Committee on Bill C-21 (1989–1991); Chairman, Standing Committee of Selection (1994–1999)
- Portfolio: Opposition Whip in the Senate (1991–1993); Government Whip in the Senate (1993–1998)

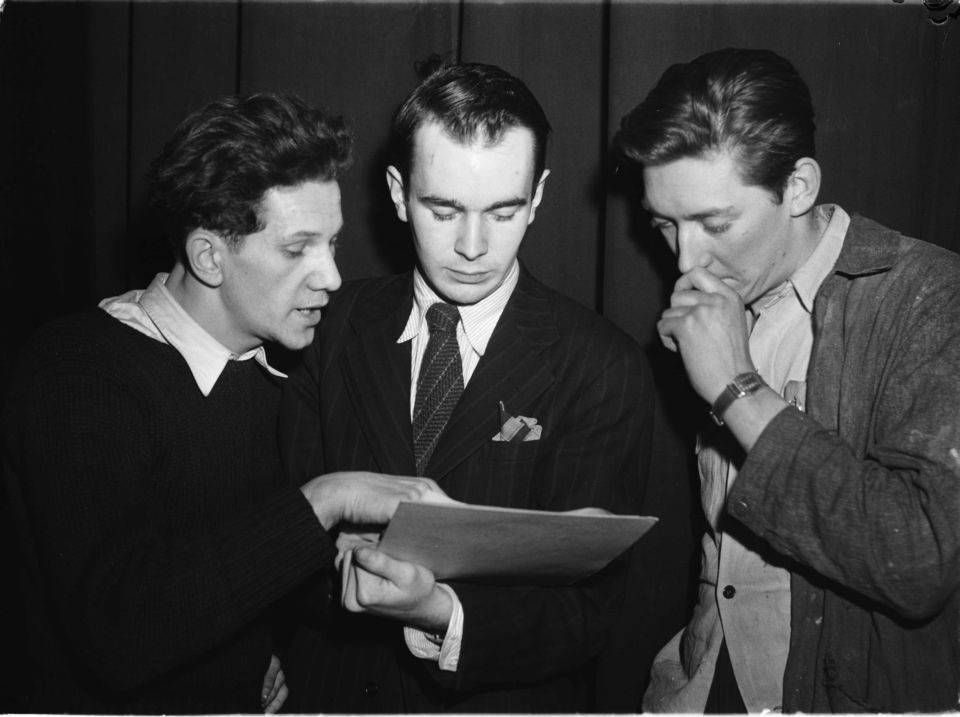
We see Roger Garand, Jacques Hébert and René L. Caron, respectively director, consultant and designer of the show la revue Bleu et or presented at the University of Montreal.

Jacques Hébert, OC (June 21, 1923 – December 6, 2007) was a Canadian author, journalist, publisher, Senator and world traveller who visited more than 130 countries.

== History ==
Born in Montreal, Quebec, Jacques Hébert began attending Saint Dunstan's University in Charlottetown, Prince Edward Island at age 16. He served as a journalist for the newspaper Le Devoir from 1951 to 1953 and created the publishing companies Éditions de l'Homme in 1958 and Éditions du Jour in 1961.

He was a reporter during the Wilbert Coffin trial in 1954 and he later published two books on the subject: Coffin était innocent (1958) and J'accuse les assassins de Coffin (1963). The latter book caused such controversy that the provincial government established a Commission of Inquiry into the case.

Hébert was a close friend of Pierre Trudeau and travelled with him to the People's Republic of China in 1960 in the midst of the Great Leap Forward. The two met both Mao Zedong and Zhou Enlai and recorded their observations in the book Deux innocents en Chine rouge (1961). The book was published in English as Two Innocents in Red China in 1968. A Chinese-language version was published in China in 2005 - Hébert attended the launch in Shanghai with Alexandre Trudeau.

In 1971, Hébert founded Canada World Youth, an organization that expands "the role of youth in developing their communities and promoting world peace".

He was appointed to the Senate on April 20, 1983, representing the senatorial division of Wellington, Quebec, and retired at the mandatory age of 75 in 1998. From 1991 to 1993 he was the Opposition Whip in the Senate and from 1993 to 1998 he was the Government Whip in the Senate.

In 1986, he went on a hunger strike for 21 days to protest a decision by the Progressive Conservative government to end the Katimavik program for Canadian youth, which he created in 1977.

In 1978, he was made an Officer of the Order of Canada. He was awarded two honorary doctorates: one from Ryerson University in 1997, and one from the University of Prince Edward Island in 2004. In 2007, shortly before his death, he was the recipient of the Distinguished Service Award of the Canadian Association of Former Parliamentarians, "presented annually to a former parliamentarian who has made an outstanding contribution to the country and its democratic institutions."

== Selected bibliography ==
- Coffin était innocent (1958)
- Deux Innocents en Chine Rouge, Jacques Hébert and Pierre E. Trudeau, Les Editions de L'Homme 1961
- Scandale à Bordeaux 1959
- J'accuse les assassins de Coffin (1963)
- Two Innocents in Red China (in collaboration with Pierre Elliott Trudeau) (English Translation, Oxford University Press, Toronto, 1968)
- The World is Round (McClelland & Stewart, Toronto, 1976)
- Have Them Build a Tower Together (McClelland & Stewart, Toronto, 1979)
- 21 Days - One Man's Fight for Canada's Youth (Optimum Publishing, Montreal, 1986)
- Travelling in Tropical Countries (Hurtig Publishers, Edmonton, 1986)
- "Hello, World!" (English Translation, Robert Davis Publishing, 1996)
- Duplessis, non merci! (Les Éditions du Boréal, Montreal, 2000)
- Katima...What? (Cosmopolite Communication, Montreal, 2001)
- En 13 points Garamond (Éditions Trois-Pistoles, Trois-Pistoles, 2002)
- Good Morning Cuba! (SIAP Publishing, Montreal, 2003)
- "红色中国的两位天真汉"(Chinese translation of "Two Innocents In Red China"), Shanghai People's Press, 2005

== See also ==
- Canada World Youth
- Katimavik

== Archives ==
There is a Jacques Hébert fonds at Library and Archives Canada.
