= George Percival Burchill =

Canadian politician (1889–1977)

George Percival Burchill (November 3, 1889 – August 22, 1977) was a lumber merchant and political figure. He sat for Northumberland-Miramichi division in the Senate of Canada from 1945 to 1977 as a Liberal.

He was born in Nelson, New Brunswick, the son of John Percival Burchill and Eliza B. Wilkinson. Percy Burchill was educated in Newcastle and then graduated from the University of New Brunswick with a Bachelor of Science in forestry in 1910. In 1916, Percy Burchill married Jean Gordon Garden.

Burchill succeeded his father as president of the firm George Burchill and Sons. The records of the Burchill family's shipbuilding and lumber operations spanning more than a century were deposited at the Provincial Archives by Percy Burchill. He was also chairman of the board of the New Brunswick Telephone Company and a director for Montreal Trust Co. He served as warden for Northumberland County from 1913 to 1915.

A member of the Liberal Party of Canada, Burchill was an unsuccessful candidate in the Northumberland constituency in the 1930 Canadian general election. He served as president of the Canadian Lumbermen's Association, the Canadian Forestry Association, the New Brunswick Council of the Boy Scouts of Canada and the New Brunswick Liberal Association. Burchill resigned his seat in the Senate due to illness a few days before his death at the age of 87.

The G. Percy Burchill Trophy is awarded to the New Brunswick team finishing highest in the final regular season standings of the Maritime Football League.

Preceded by John B. McNair; 1932-1940	New Brunswick Liberal Party President; 1941–1953	Succeeded by Harry A. Corey; 1953-1959
