= John Lang Nichol =

Canadian politician (1924–2020)

The Honourable John Lang Nichol CC

Canadian Senator from British Columbia
- In office February 24, 1966 – April 19, 1973
- Appointed by: Lester B. Pearson

Personal details
- Born: January 7, 1924 Vancouver, British Columbia, Canada
- Died: February 24, 2020 (aged 96) Vancouver, British Columbia, Canada
- Party: Liberal
- Spouses: Elizabeth Fellowes (m. 1941; died 2000); Rosann Cashin
- Children: 3, including Barbara
- Education: University of British Columbia

John Lang Nichol, CC (January 7, 1924 – February 24, 2020) was a Canadian politician who served as a senator from 1966 to 1973.

== Background ==
Born in Vancouver, British Columbia, he was president of the Liberal Federation of Canada for two terms from 1964 until 1968 and served as co-chairman of the Liberal Campaign Committee for the 1968 federal election. He was appointed to the Senate in 1966 by Lester Pearson and resigned in 1973.

He was chairman of the board of trustees of Lester B. Pearson United World College of the Pacific. He is the founding chairman of the Pacific Parkinson's Research Institute.

In 1980, he was made an Officer of the Order of Canada and was promoted to Companion in 1996.

In 1941, he married Marjorie Elizabeth Kenyon "Liz" Fellowes; she died of Parkinson's disease in December 2000. His daughter Barbara is a writer.

Nichol died in February 2020 at the age of 96.

Party political offices
Preceded by John Joseph Connolly	President of the Liberal Party of Canada; 1964–1968	Succeeded by Richard Stanbury
