= Mary Elizabeth Kinnear =

Canadian politician (1898–1991)

The Honourable Mary Elizabeth Kinnear

Canadian Senator from Ontario
- In office April 6, 1967 – April 3, 1973
- Appointed by: Lester B. Pearson

Personal details
- Born: April 3, 1898 Wainfleet, Ontario, Canada
- Died: December 24, 1991 (aged 93)
- Party: Liberal

Mary Elizabeth Kinnear (April 3, 1898 – December 24, 1991) was a Canadian senator.

== Background ==
Born in Wainfleet, Ontario, she was president of the National Federation of Liberal Women from 1959 to 1963. She was appointed to the Senate by Prime Minister Lester Pearson in 1967 representing the senatorial division of Welland, Ontario. A Liberal, she retired in 1973 on her 75th birthday.
