= Donald A. McLean =

Canadian politician

Donald Allan McLean

Member of the Senate of Canada for Charlotte County, New Brunswick division
- In office 15 March 1968 – 5 November 1973

Personal details
- Born: Donald Allan McLean; 27 January 1907 Inverness, Nova Scotia
- Died: 5 November 1973 (aged 66)
- Party: Liberal
- Profession: corporate executive

Donald Allan McLean (27 January 1907 – 5 November 1973) was a Liberal party member of the Senate of Canada. He was born in Inverness, Nova Scotia and became a corporate executive.

He was appointed to the Senate for Charlotte County, New Brunswick division on 15 March 1968 following nomination by Lester B. Pearson. He remained in that role until his death on 5 November 1973.
