= Gustave Monette =

Canadian politician

The Hon. Gustave Monette
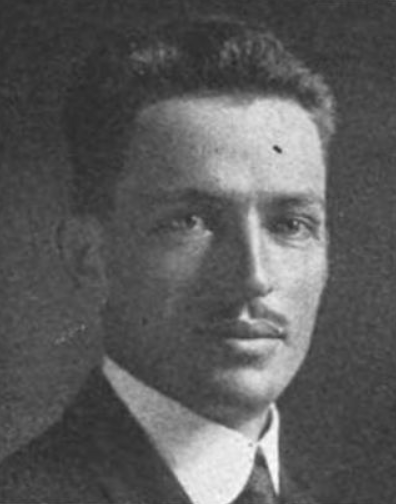

Senator for Mille Isles, Quebec
- In office 12 October 1957 – 23 December 1969
- Appointed by: John Diefenbaker
- Preceded by: Armand Daigle
- Succeeded by: Thérèse Casgrain

Personal details
- Born: 1 March 1887 Saint-Philippe-de-Laprairie, Quebec
- Died: 23 December 1969 (aged 82)
- Party: Progressive Conservative
- Spouse: Blanche Séguin
- Profession: Barrister and solicitor

Gustave Monette (1 March 1887 – 23 December 1969) was a Progressive Conservative Party member of the Senate of Canada. He was born in Saint-Philippe-de-Laprairie, Quebec and became a barrister and solicitor.

The son of Eugène Monette and Marie Roy, he was educated in Sainte-Thérèse de Blainville and at the Université de Montréal and practised law in Montreal. In 1914, he married Blanche Séguin.

Monette and his cousin Philippe Monette were defence lawyers for Adélard Delorme, a Roman Catholic priest accused of murdering his stepbrother.

Monette made attempts to gain a House of Commons of Canada seat at the Laprairie—Napierville riding as a Conservative in the 1911 and 1930 elections. He was unsuccessful with both these campaigns.

He was appointed to the Senate on 12 October 1957 for the Mille Isles, Quebec division following nomination by Prime Minister John Diefenbaker. Monette remained in that role until his death on 23 December 1969.
