= Charles Lawrence Bishop =

Canadian politician

Charles Lawrence Bishop (December 10, 1876 – September 28, 1966) was a journalist and the first working reporter to be appointed to the Senate of Canada.

Bishop was born in Bear River, Nova Scotia and was educated at Acadia University. He was a Parliament Hill correspondent for almost 50 years before being appointed to the upper house. He began as a correspondent for the Ottawa Citizen in 1898 and subsequently reported for the Southam chain. He was Southam's Ottawa bureau chief when he was named to the Senate in 1945 by William Lyon Mackenzie King and scooped the Parliamentary press gallery with the news of his own appointment. He served as president of the press gallery on several occasions, the first being in 1918.

Prior to joining the press gallery, Bishop was briefly private secretary to Finance minister W.S. Fielding in 1896. He sat in the Senate as a Liberal for the Senatorial division of Ottawa, Ontario. At the time of his resignation from the Senate, several days prior to his death, he was the oldest working Senator.
