= Richard Stanbury (politician) =

Canadian politician

The Honourable Richard Stanbury QC

Canadian Senator from Ontario
- In office 13 February 1968 – 2 May 1998

Personal details
- Born: Richard James Hardy Stanbury; May 2, 1923 Exeter, Ontario, Canada
- Died: July 21, 2014 (aged 91)
- Citizenship: Canadian
- Party: Liberal
- Relations: Robert Stanbury, brother
- Profession: Lawyer

Military service
- Years of service: 1939–1945
- Rank: Lieutenant
- Unit: Canadian Infantry Corps
- Battles/wars: World War II

Richard James Hardy Stanbury (May 2, 1923 – July 21, 2014) was a Canadian lawyer and politician. Stanbury was a Senator from February 1968 to May 1998 who also served as president of the Liberal Party of Canada from 1968 to 1973.

== Background ==
Before his appointment to the Senate on the advice of Lester Pearson in February 1968, Stanbury was a lawyer and organizer for the Presbyterian Church in Canada.

He became active in Liberal politics while a young lawyer. He was asked to take on the role of riding association president for the re-established electoral district of York Centre in the early 1950s. Under his leadership, the association got its first MP Al Hollingworth elected over Progressive Conservative candidate the prominent newspaper publisher Roy Thomson. He later became president of the Toronto and York Liberal Association from 1960 to 1964, and served as the national policy chair of the party from 1965 to 1968. He served as campaign chair of the Ontario Liberal campaign in the 1967 provincial election.

In the fall of 1967, Prime Minister Lester Pearson confided in him of his pending retirement plan, and his worries about divisions within the Ontario caucus. Pearson asked Stanbury to take on the chairmanship of the campaign committee for Ontario and to accept a Senate appointment. Stanbury became an obvious contender when Senator John Nichols announce his intention to step down as party president shortly after Stanbury took his seat in the Senate. He was elected president at the same convention that selected Pierre Trudeau as party leader.

He served as a full time president on his $22,000 senate salary, a substantial two-thirds reduction from his income from practicing law. An ardent advocate for participatory democracy, Stanbury pledged to institute regular "forums and conferences... at all levels to give the people a voice in the affairs of the party". During his presidency, all policy documents going before Cabinet now had attached to them a statement of where the Liberal Party stands on the issue in question. Stanbury was also an early proponent for disclosure of the sources of campaign funds. During his tenure as president, he also successfully argued that the party join the Liberal International.

Stanbury's brother was Liberal MP and lawyer Robert Stanbury.

== Archives ==
There is a Richard Stanbury fonds at Library and Archives Canada.

Party political offices
Preceded by John Lang Nichol	President of the Liberal Party of Canada; 1968–1973	Succeeded by Gildas Molgat
