= Paul Desruisseaux =

Canadian politician (1905–1982)

The Honourable Paul Desruisseaux

Senator for Wellington, Quebec
- In office July 8, 1966 – May 1, 1980
- Appointed by: Lester B. Pearson
- Preceded by: Charles Benjamin Howard
- Succeeded by: Jacques Hébert

Personal details
- Born: May 1, 1905 Sherbrooke, Quebec, Canada
- Died: February 2, 1982 (aged 76)
- Party: Liberal

Paul Desruisseaux (May 1, 1905 – February 2, 1982) was a Canadian lawyer, businessman, and politician.

== Life and career ==
Desruisseaux was born in Sherbrooke, Quebec, on May 1, 1905. He studied law at the Université de Montréal and was called to the Quebec bar in 1934. He was the owner of La Tribune, a daily newspaper in Sherbrooke, CHLT radio station, CKTS radio station, and television station CHLT-TV.

In 1966, he was summoned to the Senate of Canada on the advice of Lester Pearson. A Liberal, he represented the senatorial division of Wellington, Quebec. That same year, he helped raise $230,000 in funding for a new hospital of Lily Butters. He retired on his 75th birthday in 1980.

He died on February 2, 1982.
