= Nelson Rattenbury =

Canadian politician (1907–1973)

Member of the Senate of Canada for Saint John, New Brunswick division
- In office 14 February 1964 – 27 May 1973

Personal details
- Born: 27 October 1907 Charlottetown, Prince Edward Island
- Died: 27 May 1973 (aged 65)
- Party: Liberal
- Spouse: Phyllis Jane Blakeney
- Profession: business executive

Nelson Rattenbury (27 October 1907 – 27 May 1973) was a Liberal party member of the Senate of Canada. He was born in Charlottetown, Prince Edward Island and became a business executive.

The son of John Morton Rattenbury and Jessie Margaret Henderson, he was educated in Charlottetown and became a manufacturer in Saint John, New Brunswick. Rattenbury was president of Northern Roofing and Metal Workers Ltd. Industrial Insulators Ltd. and D.A. Cummings Ltd. In 1963, he married Phyllis Jane Blakeney.

He was appointed to the Senate for the Saint John, New Brunswick division on 14 February 1964 as nominated by Prime Minister Lester B. Pearson. Rattenbury remained in that role until his death on 27 May 1973.
