= Keith Davey =

Canadian politician (1926–2011)

The Honourable Keith Douglas Davey OC

Canadian Senator from Ontario
- In office February 24, 1966 – July 1, 1996
- Appointed by: Lester B. Pearson

Personal details
- Born: April 21, 1926 Toronto, Ontario, Canada
- Died: January 17, 2011 (aged 84) Toronto, Ontario, Canada
- Party: Liberal
- Spouse(s): Catherine Isobel Hart (m. 1952; div. 1975) Dorothy Elizabeth Petrie (m. 1978; died 2011)
- Children: 3
- Education: University of Toronto
- Profession: Politician; campaign organizer
- Committees: Chairman, Special Committee on Mass Media (1969–1970); Chairman, Special Committee on Mass Public Communication in Canada (1968–1969)

Douglas Keith Davey, OC (April 21, 1926 – January 17, 2011) was a Canadian politician and campaign organizer.

== Family, early life and education ==
Born in Toronto, Ontario to Charles Minto Davey (Toronto Star Production Manager) and Grace Viola (née Curtis), Keith Davey attended high school at North Toronto Collegiate Institute. Davey graduated with a Bachelor of Arts from the University of Toronto in 1949.

== Business career ==
Davey became a sales manager for CKFH, a Toronto radio station, from 1949 to 1960. The station was owned and managed by noted broadcaster Foster Hewitt.

In 1966, Davey served briefly as the second commissioner of the Canadian Football League, resigning after less than two months on the job, due to stated incompatibility with many leading league figures.

== Political career ==
Davey became a political organizer for the Liberal Party at the constituency level in Toronto in his early 20s, and joined the Executive of the Ontario Young Liberals in the 1950s, along with Judy LaMarsh (later a federal cabinet minister). In 1960 he became a campaign manager for his home riding of Eglinton.

Davey was appointed National Campaign Director of the Liberal Party of Canada in 1961. He directed the Liberal campaigns in 1963 and 1965. Commuting regularly between homes in Ottawa and Toronto, Davey played important roles in every federal Liberal campaign up to and including 1984, serving Prime Ministers Lester Pearson, Pierre Trudeau, and John Turner. These elections were held in 1968, 1972, 1974, 1979, 1980, and 1984.

In 1986, Davey published a political memoir, The Rainmaker: a Passion for Politics.

=== Senator (1966-1996) ===
Davey was appointed to the Senate of Canada by Lester Pearson in 1966, just before his 40th birthday. He resigned in 1996.

Davey was portrayed on an episode of King of Kensington as Senator Keith Davis on the episode titled Mr. King Goes to Ottawa; he was portrayed by actor Ken James.

Davey was made an Officer of the Order of Canada in 1999.

In 1969, Davey chaired the Special Committee on Mass Media. Terence Corcoran argues that it was Davey's contention that a subsidized press is necessary "to supplement the privately owned media" which "were a menace to a democratic society."

== Death ==
Davey died on January 17, 2011, aged 84, at Belmont House in Toronto. He had been suffering from Alzheimer's disease. He was survived by his second wife, and his three children from his first marriage.

Sporting positions
Preceded by Sydney Halter	Canadian Football League commissioner 1966	Succeeded by Ted Workman
