= John Joseph Connolly =

Canadian politician (1906–1982)

Hon. John Connolly

John Joseph Connolly PC OBE QC (October 31, 1906 – July 25, 1982) was a Canadian parliamentarian.

John Joseph Connolly was born in Ottawa, Ontario, and he graduated from the University of Ottawa in 1927. He received a Doctorate of Philosophy from the University of Notre Dame and also taught at the university for some time. He studied law at Université de Montréal and was called to the Quebec bar and the Ontario bar. He was a Queen's Counsel.

During World War II, he was the executive assistant to Angus Lewis Macdonald, Minister of National Defence for Naval Services. In 1944, he played a pivotal role in the dismissal of Vice-Admiral Percy W. Nelles, the highest-ranking officer in the Royal Canadian Navy. He was made an Officer of the Order of the British Empire for his work during the war.

A law professor, Connolly was appointed to the Senate of Canada as a Liberal by Prime Minister Louis St. Laurent on June 12, 1953. From 1961 to 1964, he served as the federal party's president. In 1964, he was appointed to the Cabinet by Lester Pearson becoming Leader of the Government in the Canadian Senate and Minister without portfolio. He served as government leader until 1968 when Pearson retired and remained a Senator until his own retirement in 1981.

Party political offices
| Preceded by Bruce Matthews | President of the Liberal Party of Canada; 1961–1964 | Succeeded by John Lang Nichol |
Parliament of Canada
| Preceded by William Ross Macdonald | Leader of the Government in the Senate of Canada; 1964–1968 | Succeeded by Paul Martin Sr. |
