= Lionel Choquette =

Canadian politician

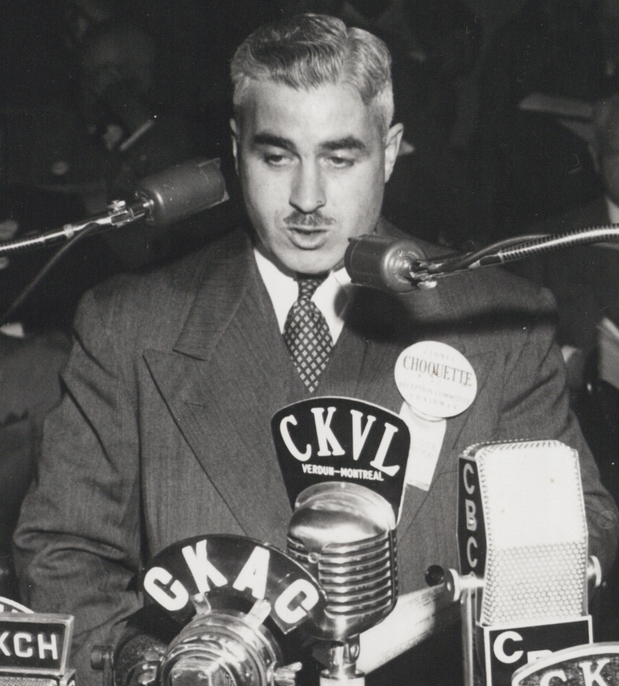

Lionel Henri Choquette (March 6, 1906 – September 27, 1983) was a Canadian lawyer and politician, who served in the Senate of Canada from 1958 to 1981.

Choquette was born in Ottawa, Ontario. He was called to the Ontario bar in 1932 and opened his law practice in Ottawa.

He was a two-time candidate in Ottawa East for a seat in the House of Commons of Canada, running in the 1935 federal election as a Conservative, and again in the 1949 election as a Progressive Conservative candidate.

Choquette was appointed to the Senate of Canada by Prime Minister John Diefenbaker in 1958, and remained there until reaching mandatory retirement age in 1981.

He died on September 27, 1983, at the Montfort Hospital in Ottawa, three days after suffering a stroke at his home.
