= Josie Alice Quart =

Canadian politician

The Hon. Josie Alice Quart

Senator for Victoria, Quebec
- In office 1960–1980
- Appointed by: John Diefenbaker
- Preceded by: John Thomas Hackett
- Succeeded by: Leo Kolber

Personal details
- Born: 8 November 1895 Quebec City, Quebec
- Died: 17 April 1980 (aged 84)
- Party: Progressive Conservative

Josie Alice Quart, MBE (8 November 1895 – 17 April 1980) was a Canadian senator. A Progressive Conservative, she was appointed to the Senate of Canada on 16 November 1960 on the recommendation of Prime Minister John Diefenbaker. She represented the senatorial division of Victoria, Quebec until her death.
