= Norman McLeod Paterson =

Canadian politician

The Honourable Norman McLeod Paterson

Canadian Senator from Ontario
- In office February 9, 1940 – June 18, 1981
- Appointed by: William Lyon Mackenzie King

Personal details
- Born: August 3, 1883 Portage la Prairie, Manitoba, Canada
- Died: August 10, 1983 (aged 100) Ottawa, Ontario, Canada
- Party: Liberal
- Occupation: Politician; businessman

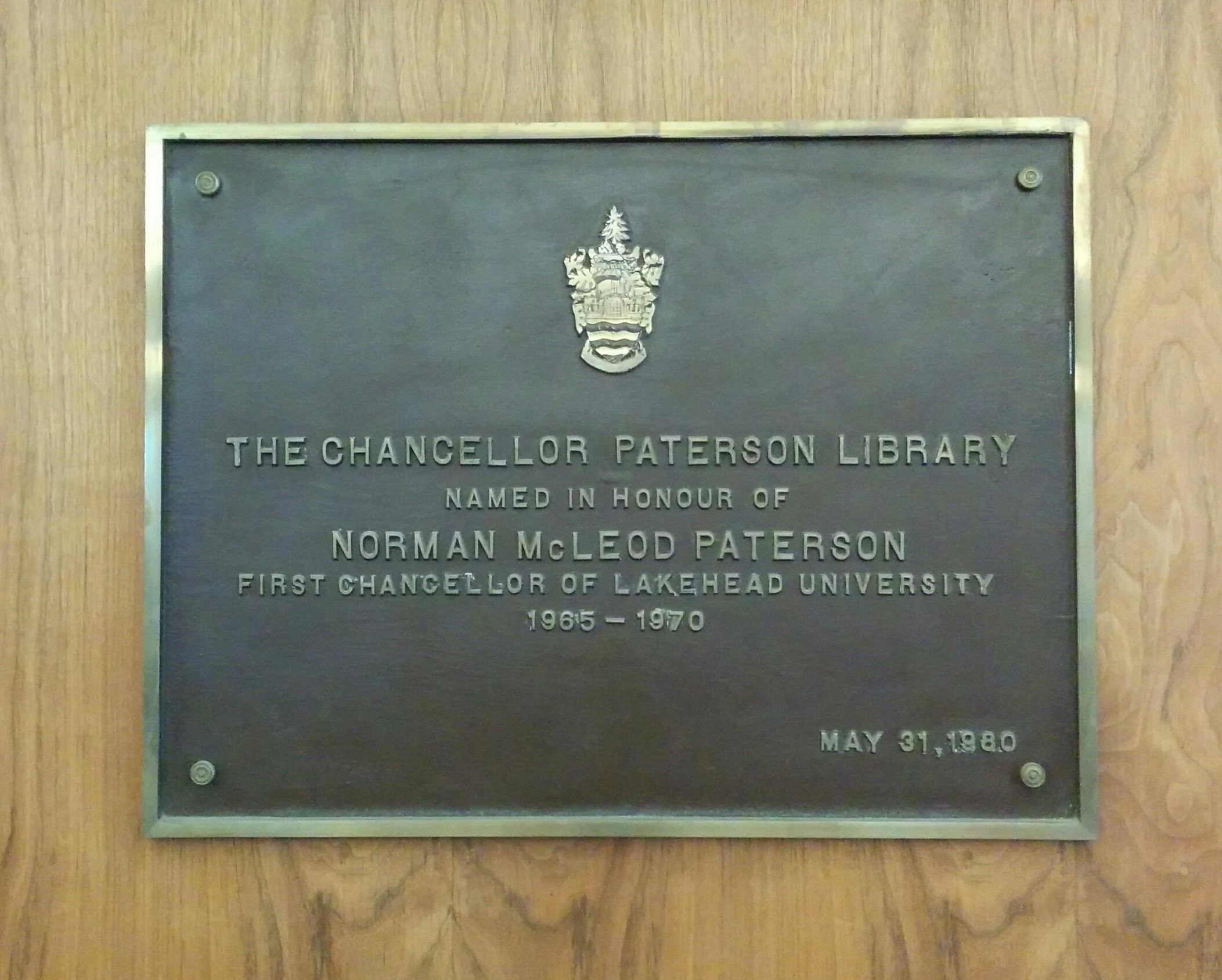
Chancellor Paterson Library plaque at Lakehead University

Norman McLeod Paterson, KGStJ, DCL, LLD (August 3, 1883 – August 10, 1983) was a Canadian businessman and politician.

== Life and career ==
Born in Portage la Prairie, Manitoba, the son of Hugh Savigny Paterson and Ella Snider, he started working with the Manitoba Railway and Canal Company in 1897. Paterson later worked for the Great Northern Railway of Canada as a telegrapher, eventually becoming a purchasing agent.

In 1903, he started working with his father in the grain business and founded a firm, N.M Paterson and Company, in 1908. Later, he started Paterson Steamships Limited. The two firms later became N.M. Paterson and Sons Limited, which is still run by the Paterson family as Paterson GlobalFoods.

According to the Manitoba marriage registration (1915–176082), Paterson married Eleanor Margaret Macdonald in Winnipeg on June 2, 1915.

He was summoned to the Senate of Canada in 1940, representing the senatorial division of Milton, Ontario. A Liberal, he resigned in 1981 just before his 98th birthday. He was made a Knight of the Order of St. John in 1945.

From 1965 to 1971, he was the first chancellor of Lakehead University. He also served on the Board of Directors of Carleton University in Ottawa. The Norman Paterson School of International Affairs was established in 1965 at Carleton University with a grant of $400,000 from Paterson. Paterson died in his sleep at his home in Ottawa on August 10, 1983, a week after his 100th birthday.

In 1970, he established a private charitable foundation, The Paterson Foundation, which provides grants to community organizations in Saskatchewan, Manitoba, and Northwestern Ontario.
