= Salter Hayden =

Canadian lawyer and politician

The Honourable Salter Adrian Hayden OC
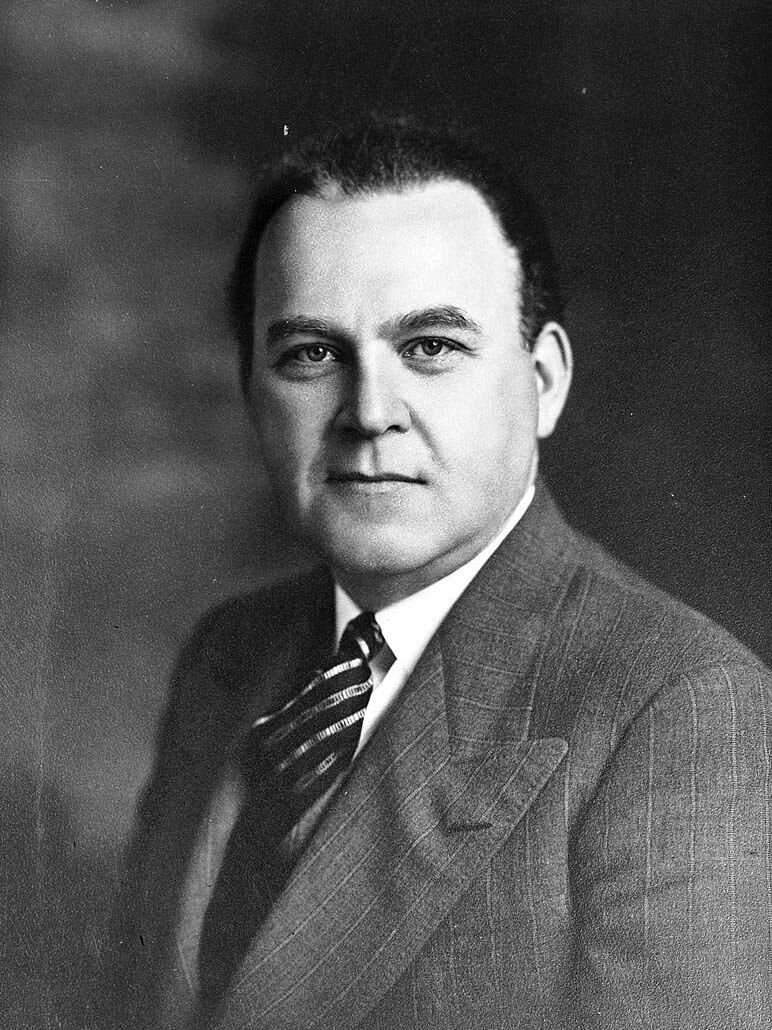
- Hayden, c. 1955

Canadian Senator from Ontario
- In office 1940–1983
- Appointed by: William Lyon Mackenzie King

Personal details
- Born: May 31, 1896 Ottawa, Ontario, Canada
- Died: January 5, 1987 (aged 90)
- Education: University of Ottawa

Salter Adrian Hayden, OC (May 31, 1896 – January 5, 1987) was a Canadian lawyer and senator.

== Biography ==
Born in Ottawa, he received his education from the University of Ottawa and Osgoode Hall Law School. He joined the law firm of McCarthy and McCarthy (now McCarthy Tétrault) in 1923 and became a partner in 1929. He resigned from the firm in 1983. He ran unsuccessfully in the Toronto riding of St. Paul's in the 1935 federal election. In 1940, he was awarded an honorary doctoral degree from the University of Ottawa.

He was appointed to the Senate in February 1940 by Prime Minister Mackenzie King, representing the senatorial division of Toronto, Ontario. He sat as a Liberal and was the chairman of the Canadian Senate Standing Committee on Banking, Trade and Commerce.

Along with Senator William Daum Euler, Hayden helped change the law that had prohibited the sale of margarine in Canada. Of note, this was the Judicial Committee of the Privy Council's (JCPC) last case under the trade and commerce power of the BNA Act, and one of the last six judgements on a Canadian issue.

During the 1970s, he helped extend Senate rule, 74.(1). This procedure had arisen in the 1940s to allow for early Senate examination of potential supply bills. At the initiative of Senator Hayden, this practice was broadened to apply to other bills, and it has since been referred to as the “Hayden formula.” This allows the Senate to pre-study the subject matter, and to form an initial opinion of a bill that has been introduced in the House of Commons, even before it has been adopted for its first reading in the Senate. When the bill is received, the Senate can adopt or amend it in a timely manner.

He resigned from the Senate on November 1, 1983, due to ill health.

On December 29, 1986, Hayden was made an Officer of the Order of Canada. He died a week later at age 90.
