= Frederic McGrand =

Canadian politician

The Honourable Frederic Addison McGrand
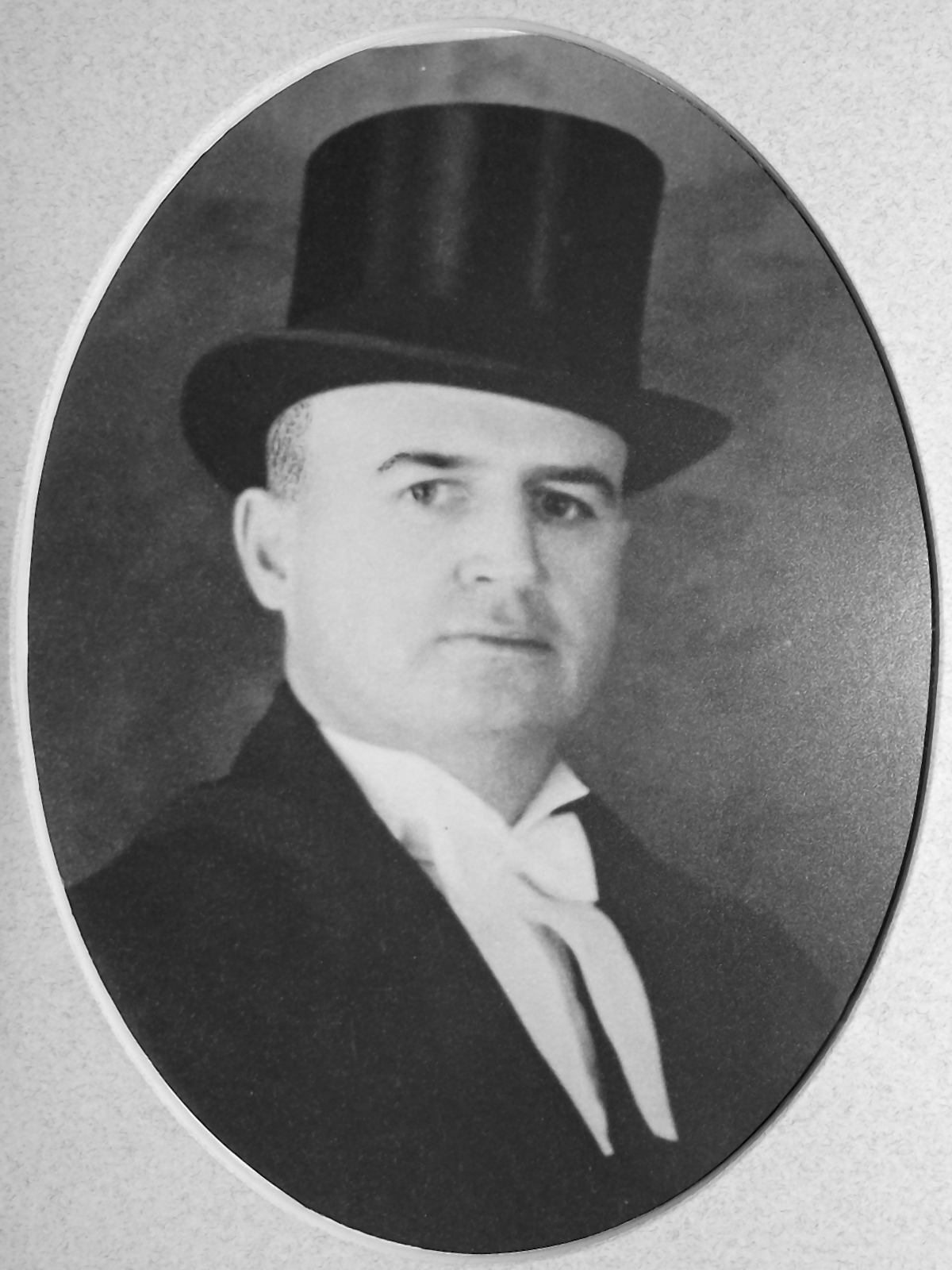
- Official portrait

Senator for Sunbury, New Brunswick
- In office 1955–1988
- Appointed by: Louis St. Laurent

Member of the Legislative Assembly of New Brunswick for Sunbury County
- In office 1939–1952

Member of the Legislative Assembly of New Brunswick for Queen's
- In office 1935–1939

Personal details
- Born: July 5, 1895 Keswick Ridge, New Brunswick
- Died: September 3, 1988 (aged 93)
- Party: Liberal
- Committees: Chair, Standing Committee on Debates and Reporting (1967–1968); Chair, Subcommittee on Childhood Experiences as Causes of Criminal Behaviour (1977–1979)

Frederic Addison McGrand (July 5, 1895 – September 3, 1988) was a Canadian physician and politician. Born in Keswick Ridge, New Brunswick, he received his education at St. Thomas College and his medical degree from McGill University.

McGrand served as a member of the council for Queens County from 1927 to 1937. In 1935, he was elected to the Legislative Assembly of New Brunswick for Queens. From 1939 to 1944, he was the Speaker of the Legislative Assembly. From 1944 to 1952, he was the Minister of Health and Social Services. McGrand represented Sunbury County in the provincial assembly from 1939 to 1952.

In 1955, he was summoned to the Senate of Canada representing the senatorial division of Sunbury, New Brunswick. A Liberal, he resigned in 1988.

McGrand also published several books including:

- Backward glances at Sunbury and Queens, New Brunswick Historical Society, 1967
- Hurry Doctor: experiences of Dr. Fred A. McGrand among patients, friends and politicians, 1986
