= Eric Cook (politician) =

Canadian politician

The Honourable Eric Cook

Senator for St. John's East, Newfoundland and Labrador
- In office 1964–1984
- Appointed by: Lester B. Pearson

Personal details
- Born: 26 July 1909 St. John's, Newfoundland
- Died: 23 August 1986 (aged 77)
- Party: Liberal (1964 - 1982)
- Other political affiliations: Independent (1982 - 1984)

Eric Cook (26 July 1909 – 23 August 1986) was a Canadian politician.

Born in St. John's, Newfoundland, he was a lawyer, businessman and a city councillor in St. John's. He was also the president of the Newfoundland Liberal party. He was summoned to the Senate of Canada in 1964 representing the senatorial division of St. John's East, Newfoundland and Labrador. He sat a member of the Liberal caucus until 1982 when he resigned and sat as an Independent.
