= Allister Grosart =

Canadian politician (1906–1984)

Allister Grosart, PC (December 13, 1906 – February 8, 1984) was a Progressive Conservative politician, Senator, journalist and businessman in Canada.

Born in Dublin, Ireland, his mother was a missionary and he was raised in China. He received a degree in law from the University of Toronto but became a journalist instead of a lawyer. He worked for the Toronto Daily Star and The Globe and Mail. During World War II, he served with the 2nd battalion of the Irish Regiment reaching the rank of major. After the war, he eventually joined a public relations firm.

Grosart was a key party organizer and is credited by many for organizing the victories of the Diefenbaker Tories in the 1957 federal election in which the party defeated the Liberals for the first time since 1930. He was also a key organizer in the subsequent 1958 election in which the Diefenbaker government was returned with the largest majority in Canadian history.

In 1962, Diefenbaker appointed Grosart to the Senate. He served as deputy leader of the Opposition from 1974 until 1979, and became Speaker of the Senate of Canada when the Tories again formed government from 1979 to 1980 under Joe Clark. Grosart retired from the Senate in 1981, and was appointed to the Queen's Privy Council for Canada in honour of his long service.

== Archives ==
There is an Allister Grosart fonds at Library and Archives Canada.
