= List of members of the Canadian House of Commons (P) =

== Pac–Par ==
- Lucien Turcotte Pacaud b. 1879 first elected in 1911 as Liberal member for Mégantic, Quebec.
- Massimo Pacetti b. 1962 first elected in 2002 as Liberal member for Saint-Léonard—Saint-Michel, Quebec.
- Rey Pagtakhan b. 1935 first elected in 1988 as Liberal member for Winnipeg North, Manitoba.
- Daniel Paillé b. 1950 first elected in 2009 as Bloc Québécois member for Hochelaga, Quebec.
- Pascal-Pierre Paillé b. 1978 first elected in 2008 as Bloc Québécois member for Louis-Hébert, Quebec.
- Henry Nicholas Paint b. 1830 first elected in 1882 as Conservative member for Richmond, Nova Scotia.
- John Cameron Pallett b. 1921 first elected in 1954 as Progressive Conservative member for Peel, Ontario.
- Brian Pallister b. 1954 first elected in 2000 as Canadian Alliance member for Portage—Lisgar, Manitoba.
- Acalus Lockwood Palmer b. 1820 first elected in 1872 as Liberal member for City and County of St. John, New Brunswick.
- Jim Pankiw b. 1966 first elected in 1997 as Reform member for Saskatoon—Humboldt, Saskatchewan.
- Annick Papillon b. 1980 first elected in 2011 as New Democratic Party member for Québec, Quebec.
- Louis-Joseph Papineau b. 1861 first elected in 1908 as Liberal member for Beauharnois, Quebec.
- Steve Paproski b. 1928 first elected in 1968 as Progressive Conservative member for Edmonton Centre, Alberta.
- Anselme Homère Pâquet b. 1830 first elected in 1867 as Liberal member for Berthier, Quebec.
- Eugène Paquet b. 1867 first elected in 1904 as Conservative member for L'Islet, Quebec.
- Pierre Paquette b. 1955 first elected in 2000 as Bloc Québécois member for Joliette, Quebec.
- Christian Paradis b. 1974 first elected in 2006 as Conservative member for Mégantic—L'Érable, Quebec.
- Denis Paradis b. 1949 first elected in 1995 as Liberal member for Brome—Missisquoi, Quebec.
- François-Xavier Paradis b. 1844 first elected in 1890 as Conservative member for Napierville, Quebec.
- Frederick Forsyth Pardee b. 1866 first elected in 1905 as Liberal member for Lambton West, Ontario.
- Philippe Paré b. 1935 first elected in 1993 as Bloc Québécois member for Louis-Hébert, Quebec.
- Charles Eugène Parent b. 1894 first elected in 1935 as Liberal member for Quebec West and South, Quebec.
- Georges Parent b. 1879 first elected in 1904 as Liberal member for Montmorency, Quebec.
- Gilbert Parent b. 1935 first elected in 1974 as Liberal member for St. Catharines, Ontario.
- Louis-Étienne Parent b. 1875 first elected in 1930 as Liberal member for Terrebonne, Quebec.
- Joseph Aimé Roger Parizeau b. 1920 first elected in 1958 as Progressive Conservative member for Lac-Saint-Jean, Quebec.
- Rob Parker b. 1943 first elected in 1978 as Progressive Conservative member for Eglinton, Ontario.
- Sid Parker b. 1930 first elected in 1980 as New Democratic Party member for Kootenay East—Revelstoke, British Columbia.
- Thomas Sutherland Parker b. 1829 first elected in 1867 as Liberal member for Wellington Centre, Ontario.
- Charles Henry Parmelee b. 1855 first elected in 1896 as Liberal member for Shefford, Quebec.
- Carolyn Parrish b. 1946 first elected in 1993 as Liberal member for Mississauga West, Ontario.
- John Edmund Parry b. 1946 first elected in 1984 as New Democratic Party member for Kenora—Rainy River, Ontario.

== Pas–Pay ==
- James Ernest Pascoe b. 1900 first elected in 1958 as Progressive Conservative member for Moose Jaw—Lake Centre, Saskatchewan.
- Esioff-Léon Patenaude b. 1875 first elected in 1915 as Conservative member for Hochelaga, Quebec.
- William Paterson b. 1839 first elected in 1872 as Liberal member for Brant South, Ontario.
- Bernard Patry b. 1943 first elected in 1993 as Liberal member for Pierrefonds—Dollard, Quebec.
- Claude Patry b. 1953 first elected in 2011 as New Democratic Party member for Jonquière—Alma, Quebec.
- Alexander Bell Patterson b. 1911 first elected in 1953 as Social Credit member for Fraser Valley, British Columbia.
- James Colebrooke Patterson b. 1839 first elected in 1878 as Conservative member for Essex, Ontario.
- James Edward Jack Patterson b. 1884 first elected in 1935 as Liberal member for Victoria—Carleton, New Brunswick.
- William Albert Patterson b. 1841 first elected in 1891 as Conservative member for Colchester, Nova Scotia.
- Jeremy Patzer b. 1987 first elected in 2019 as Conservative member for Cypress Hills—Grasslands, Saskatchewan.
- Rémi Paul b. 1921 first elected in 1958 as Progressive Conservative member for Berthier—Maskinongé—delanaudière, Quebec.
- William James Paul b. 1854 first elected in 1911 as Conservative member for Lennox and Addington, Ontario.
- Pierre Paul-Hus b. 1969 first elected in 2015 as Conservative member for Charlesbourg—Haute-Saint-Charles, Quebec.
- Monique Pauzé b. 1959 first elected in 2015 as Bloc Québécois member for Repentigny, Quebec.
- Jean Payne b. 1939 first elected in 1993 as Liberal member for St. John's West, Newfoundland and Labrador.
- LaVar Payne b. 1945 first elected in 2008 as Conservative member for Medicine Hat, Alberta.
- William Hector Payne b. 1914 first elected in 1958 as Progressive Conservative member for Coast-Capilano, British Columbia.

== Pea–Pep ==
- George Pearkes b. 1888 first elected in 1945 as Progressive Conservative member for Nanaimo, British Columbia.
- Albert John Pearsall b. 1915 first elected in 1974 as Liberal member for Coast Chilcotin, British Columbia.
- Frederick M. Pearson b. 1827 first elected in 1870 as Liberal member for Colchester, Nova Scotia.
- Glen Pearson b. 1950 first elected in 2006 as Liberal member for London North Centre, Ontario.
- Lester Bowles Pearson b. 1897 first elected in 1948 as Liberal member for Algoma East, Ontario.
- Cyrus Wesley Peck b. 1871 first elected in 1917 as Unionist member for Skeena, British Columbia.
- Edward Armour Peck b. 1858 first elected in 1925 as Conservative member for Peterborough West, Ontario.
- Ève Péclet b. 1988 first elected in 2011 as New Democratic Party member for La Pointe-de-l'Île, Quebec.
- Ambrose Hubert Peddle b. 1927 first elected in 1968 as Progressive Conservative member for Grand Falls—White Bay—Labrador, Newfoundland and Labrador.
- Isaac Ellis Pedlow b. 1861 first elected in 1917 as Laurier Liberal member for Renfrew South, Ontario.
- Charles Alphonse Pantaléon Pelletier b. 1837 first elected in 1869 as Liberal member for Kamouraska, Quebec.
- François Jean Pelletier b. 1863 first elected in 1917 as Laurier Liberal member for Matane, Quebec.
- Gérard Pelletier b. 1919 first elected in 1965 as Liberal member for Hochelaga, Quebec.
- Irénée Pelletier b. 1939 first elected in 1972 as Liberal member for Sherbrooke, Quebec.
- Louis Conrad Pelletier b. 1852 first elected in 1891 as Conservative member for Laprairie, Quebec.
- Louis-Philippe Pelletier b. 1857 first elected in 1911 as Conservative member for Quebec County, Quebec.
- René-Antoine Pelletier b. 1908 first elected in 1935 as Social Credit member for Peace River, Alberta.
- Gaston Péloquin b. 1939 first elected in 1993 as Bloc Québécois member for Brome—Missisquoi, Quebec.
- Peter Penashue b. 1964 first elected in 2011 as Conservative member for Labrador, Newfoundland and Labrador.
- Lawrence T. Pennell b. 1915 first elected in 1962 as Liberal member for Brant—Haldimand, Ontario.
- B. Keith Penner b. 1933 first elected in 1968 as Liberal member for Thunder Bay, Ontario.
- Robert Pennock b. 1936 first elected in 1984 as Progressive Conservative member for Etobicoke North, Ontario.
- Edward Goff Penny b. 1858 first elected in 1896 as Liberal member for St. Lawrence, Quebec.
- Charlie Penson b. 1942 first elected in 1993 as Reform member for Peace River, Alberta.
- Jean-Luc Pépin b. 1924 first elected in 1963 as Liberal member for Drummond—Arthabaska, Quebec.
- Lucie Pépin b. 1936 first elected in 1984 as Liberal member for Outremont, Quebec.

== Per–Pet ==
- Janko Peric b. 1949 first elected in 1993 as Liberal member for Cambridge, Ontario.
- Pat Perkins b. 1953 first elected in 2014 as Conservative member for Whitby—Oshawa, Ontario.
- Rick Perkins b. 1961 first elected in 2021 as Conservative member for South Shore—St. Margarets, Nova Scotia.
- Ernest Perley b. 1877 first elected in 1930 as Liberal member for Qu'Appelle, Saskatchewan.
- George Halsey Perley b. 1857 first elected in 1904 as Conservative member for Argenteuil, Quebec.
- William Dell Perley b. 1838 first elected in 1887 as Conservative member for Assiniboia East, Northwest Territories.
- William Goodhue Perley b. 1820 first elected in 1887 as Conservative member for City of Ottawa, Ontario.
- Fizalam-William Perras b. 1876 first elected in 1925 as Liberal member for Wright, Quebec.
- Joseph Stanislas Perrault b. 1846 first elected in 1879 as Conservative member for Charlevoix, Quebec.
- Manon Perreault b. 1965 first elected in 2011 as New Democratic Party member for Montcalm.
- Ray Perrault b. 1926 first elected in 1968 as Liberal member for Burnaby—Seymour, British Columbia.
- Gérard Perron b. 1920 first elected in 1962 as Social Credit member for Beauce, Quebec.
- Gilles-A. Perron b. 1940 first elected in 1997 as Bloc Québécois member for Saint-Eustache—Sainte-Thérèse, Quebec.
- Robert Perron b. 1915 first elected in 1953 as Progressive Conservative member for Dorchester, Quebec.
- Yves Perron first elected in 2019 as Bloc Québécois member for Berthier—Maskinongé, Quebec.
- Charles Perry b. 1818 first elected in 1867 as Conservative member for Peterborough West, Ontario.
- Stanislaus Francis Perry b. 1823 first elected in 1874 as Liberal member for Prince County, Prince Edward Island.
- Joe Peschisolido b. 1963 first elected in 2000 as Canadian Alliance member for Richmond, British Columbia.
- Douglas Dennison Peters b. 1930 first elected in 1993 as Liberal member for Scarborough East, Ontario.
- Arnold Peters b. 1922 first elected in 1957 as Cooperative Commonwealth Federation member for Timiskaming, Ontario.
- James Scott Peterson b. 1941 first elected in 1980 as Liberal member for Willowdale, Ontario.
- Kyle Peterson b. 1971 first elected in 2015 as Liberal member for Newmarket—Aurora, Ontario.
- Peter James Peterson b. 1953 first elected in 1984 as Progressive Conservative member for Hamilton West, Ontario.
- Daniel Petit b. 1947 first elected in 2006 as Conservative member for Charlesbourg—Haute-Saint-Charles, Quebec.
- Ginette Petitpas Taylor first elected in 2015 as Liberal member for Moncton—Riverview—Dieppe, New Brunswick.
- Nathaniel Pettes b. 1816 first elected in 1874 as Liberal member for Brome, Quebec.
- William Varney Pettet b. 1858 first elected in 1896 as Patrons of Industry member for Prince Edward, Ontario.
- Pierre Pettigrew b. 1951 first elected in 1996 as Liberal member for Papineau—Saint-Michel, Quebec.
- George Hamilton Pettit b. 1872 first elected in 1925 as Conservative member for Welland, Ontario.

== Ph ==
- Frank Philbrook b. 1931 first elected in 1974 as Liberal member for Halton, Ontario.
- Arthur Phillips b. 1930 first elected in 1979 as Liberal member for Vancouver Centre, British Columbia.
- Orville Howard Phillips b. 1924 first elected in 1957 as Progressive Conservative member for Prince, Prince Edward Island.
- Elmore Philpott b. 1896 first elected in 1953 as Liberal member for Vancouver South, British Columbia.
- Jane Philpott b. 1960 first elected in 2015 as Liberal member for Markham—Stouffville, Ontario.
- Beth Phinney b. 1938 first elected in 1988 as Liberal member for Hamilton Mountain, Ontario.

== Pi ==
- Louis-Philippe Picard b. 1899 first elected in 1940 as Liberal member for Bellechasse, Quebec.
- Michel Picard b. 1960 first elected in 2015 as Liberal member for Montarville, Quebec.
- Pauline Picard b. 1947 first elected in 1993 as Bloc Québécois member for Drummond, Quebec.
- Camille Piché b. 1865 first elected in 1904 as Liberal member for St. Mary, Quebec.
- Jerry Pickard b. 1940 first elected in 1988 as Liberal member for Essex—Kent, Ontario.
- John Pickard b. 1824 first elected in 1868 as Independent Liberal member for York, New Brunswick.
- Follin Horace Pickel b. 1866 first elected in 1930 as Conservative member for Brome—Missisquoi, Quebec.
- Jack Pickersgill b. 1905 first elected in 1953 as Liberal member for Bonavista—Twillingate, Newfoundland and Labrador.
- Samuel Walter Willet Pickup b. 1859 first elected in 1904 as Liberal member for Annapolis, Nova Scotia.
- Allan Ernest Pietz b. 1925 first elected in 1984 as Progressive Conservative member for Welland, Ontario.
- Louis-Joseph Pigeon b. 1922 first elected in 1958 as Progressive Conservative member for Joliette—l'Assomption—Montcalm, Quebec.
- Jean Pigott b. 1924 first elected in 1976 as Progressive Conservative member for Ottawa—Carleton, Ontario.
- Gary Pillitteri b. 1936 first elected in 1993 as Liberal member for Niagara Falls, Ontario.
- François Pilon b. 1958 first elected in 2011 as New Democratic Party member for Laval—Les Îles, Quebec.
- J.-E. Bernard Pilon b. 1918 first elected in 1962 as Liberal member for Chambly—Rouville, Quebec.
- Joseph Albert Pinard b. 1878 first elected in 1936 as Liberal member for Ottawa East, Ontario.
- Roch Pinard b. 1910 first elected in 1945 as Liberal member for Chambly—Rouville, Quebec.
- Yvon Pinard b. 1940 first elected in 1974 as Liberal member for Drummond, Quebec.
- Alfred Pinsonneault b. 1830 first elected in 1867 as Conservative member for Laprairie, Quebec.
- Walter Pitman b. 1929 first elected in 1960 as New Party member for Peterborough, Ontario.

== Pl ==
- Louis Plamondon b. 1943 first elected in 1984 as Progressive Conservative member for Richelieu, Quebec.
- John Milton Platt b. 1840 first elected in 1882 as Liberal member for Prince Edward, Ontario.
- Samuel Platt b. 1812 first elected in 1875 as Independent member for Toronto East, Ontario.
- Hugh John Plaxton b. 1904 first elected in 1935 as Liberal member for Trinity, Ontario.
- André Plourde b. 1937 first elected in 1984 as Progressive Conservative member for Kamouraska—Rivière-du-Loup, Quebec.
- Lucien Plourde b. 1930 first elected in 1962 as Social Credit member for Quebec West, Quebec.
- Josiah Plumb b. 1816 first elected in 1874 as Conservative member for Niagara, Ontario.
- D'Arcy Britton Plunkett b. 1872 first elected in 1928 as Conservative member for Victoria, British Columbia.

== Po ==
- Pierre Poilievre b. 1979 first elected in 2004 as Conservative member for Nepean—Carleton, Ontario.
- Joseph Alphée Poirier b. 1899 first elected in 1940 as Liberal member for Bonaventure, Quebec.
- Denise Poirier-Rivard b. 1941 first elected in 2004 as Bloc Québécois member for Châteauguay—Saint-Constant, Quebec.
- Jean-Claude Poissant b. 1960 first elected in 2015 as Liberal member for La Prairie, Quebec.
- Roger Pomerleau b. 1947 first elected in 1993 as Bloc Québécois member for Anjou—Rivière-des-Prairies, Quebec.
- William Albert Pommer b. 1895 first elected in 1953 as Liberal member for Lisgar, Manitoba.
- Eric Joseph Poole b. 1907 first elected in 1935 as Social Credit member for Red Deer, Alberta.
- James Colledge Pope b. 1826 first elected in 1873 as Conservative member for Prince County, Prince Edward Island.
- John Henry Pope b. 1824 first elected in 1867 as Liberal-Conservative member for Compton, Quebec.
- Rufus Henry Pope b. 1857 first elected in 1889 as Conservative member for Compton, Quebec.
- Arthur Portelance b. 1928 first elected in 1968 as Liberal member for Gamelin, Quebec.
- Victor Clarence Porteous b. 1893 first elected in 1930 as Conservative member for Grey North, Ontario.
- Edward Guss Porter b. 1859 first elected in 1902 as Conservative member for Hastings West, Ontario.
- Robert Porter b. 1833 first elected in 1887 as Liberal-Conservative member for Huron West, Ontario.
- Robert Harold Porter b. 1933 first elected in 1984 as Progressive Conservative member for Medicine Hat, Alberta.
- Vincent-Joseph Pottier b. 1897 first elected in 1935 as Liberal member for Shelburne—Yarmouth—Clare, Nova Scotia.
- Fabian Hugh Poulin b. 1931 first elected in 1972 as Liberal member for Ottawa Centre, Ontario.
- Raoul Poulin b. 1900 first elected in 1949 as Independent member for Beauce, Quebec.
- Barthélemy Pouliot b. 1811 first elected in 1867 as Conservative member for L'Islet, Quebec.
- Charles Eugène Pouliot b. 1856 first elected in 1896 as Liberal member for Témiscouata, Quebec.
- Jean-Baptiste Pouliot b. 1816 first elected in 1874 as Liberal member for Témiscouata, Quebec.
- Jean-François Pouliot b. 1890 first elected in 1924 as Liberal member for Témiscouata, Quebec.
- John Poupore b. 1817 first elected in 1878 as Conservative member for Pontiac, Quebec.
- William Joseph Poupore b. 1846 first elected in 1896 as Conservative member for Pontiac, Quebec.
- Henry Absalom Powell b. 1855 first elected in 1895 as Liberal-Conservative member for Westmorland, New Brunswick.
- Charles Gavan Power b. 1888 first elected in 1917 as Laurier Liberal member for Quebec South, Quebec.
- Charles J. Power b. 1948 first elected in 1997 as Progressive Conservative member for St. John's West, Newfoundland and Labrador.
- Francis Gavan Power b. 1918 first elected in 1955 as Liberal member for Quebec South, Quebec.
- James Augustine Power b. 1903 first elected in 1953 as Liberal member for St. John's West, Newfoundland and Labrador.
- Patrick Power b. 1815 first elected in 1867 as Anti-Confederate member for Halifax, Nova Scotia.
- William Power b. 1849 first elected in 1902 as Liberal member for Quebec West, Quebec.
- Russ Powers b. 1949 first elected in 2004 as Liberal member for Ancaster—Dundas—Flamborough—Westdale, Ontario.
- Marcus Powlowski b. 1960 first elected in 2019 as Liberal member for Thunder Bay—Rainy River, Ontario.
- Christian Henry Pozer b. 1835 first elected in 1867 as Liberal member for Beauce, Quebec.

== Pr ==
- David Pratt b. 1955 first elected in 1997 as Liberal member for Nepean—Carleton, Ontario.
- Robert John Pratt b. 1907 first elected in 1957 as Progressive Conservative member for Jacques-Cartier—Lasalle, Quebec.
- Joseph Raymond Fournier Préfontaine b. 1850 first elected in 1886 as Liberal member for Chambly, Quebec.
- Jim Prentice b. 1956 first elected in 2004 as Conservative member for Calgary North Centre, Alberta.
- Joe Preston b. 1955 first elected in 2004 as Conservative member for Elgin—Middlesex—London, Ontario.
- Richard Franklin Preston b. 1860 first elected in 1922 as Conservative member for Lanark, Ontario.
- Jules-Édouard Prévost b. 1871 first elected in 1917 as Laurier Liberal member for Terrebonne, Quebec.
- Wilfrid Prévost b. 1832 first elected in 1872 as Liberal member for Two Mountains, Quebec.
- David Price b. 1945 first elected in 1997 as Progressive Conservative member for Compton—Stanstead, Quebec.
- Joseph Price b. 1945 first elected in 1984 as Progressive Conservative member for Burin—St. George's, Newfoundland and Labrador.
- Otto Baird Price b. 1877 first elected in 1925 as Conservative member for Westmorland, New Brunswick.
- William Price b. 1867 first elected in 1908 as Conservative member for Quebec West, Quebec.
- William Evan Price b. 1827 first elected in 1872 as Liberal member for Chicoutimi—Saguenay, Quebec.
- Penny Priddy b. 1944 first elected in 2006 as New Democratic Party member for Surrey North, British Columbia.
- William Pridham b. 1841 first elected in 1892 as Conservative member for Perth South, Ontario.
- M. Ervin Pringle b. 1910 first elected in 1968 as Liberal member for Fraser Valley East, British Columbia.
- Robert Abercrombie Pringle b. 1855 first elected in 1900 as Conservative member for Cornwall and Stormont, Ontario.
- Edward Gawler Prior b. 1853 first elected in 1888 as Conservative member for Victoria, British Columbia.
- John Pritchard b. 1861 first elected in 1921 as Progressive member for Wellington North, Ontario.
- Robert William Prittie b. 1919 first elected in 1962 as New Democratic Party member for Burnaby—Richmond, British Columbia.
- John Oliver Probe b. 1900 first elected in 1945 as Cooperative Commonwealth Federation member for Regina City, Saskatchewan.
- Dick Proctor b. 1941 first elected in 1997 as New Democratic Party member for Palliser, Saskatchewan.
- Denis Pronovost b. 1953 first elected in 1988 as Progressive Conservative member for Saint-Maurice, Quebec.
- George Proud b. 1939 first elected in 1988 as Liberal member for Hillsborough, Prince Edward Island.
- John Hugh Proudfoot b. 1912 first elected in 1949 as Liberal member for Pontiac—Témiscamingue, Quebec.
- Edmond Proulx b. 1875 first elected in 1904 as Liberal member for Prescott, Ontario.
- Isidore Proulx b. 1840 first elected in 1891 as Liberal member for Prescott, Ontario.
- Marcel Proulx b. 1946 first elected in 1999 as Liberal member for Hull—Aylmer, Quebec.
- Carmen Provenzano b. 1942 first elected in 1997 as Liberal member for Sault Ste. Marie, Ontario.
- Nathalie Provost first elected in 2025 as Liberal member for Châteauguay—Les Jardins-de-Napierville, Quebec.
- Lemuel Ezra Prowse b. 1858 first elected in 1908 as Liberal member for Queen's, Prince Edward Island.
- Marcel Prud'homme b. 1934 first elected in 1964 as Liberal member for Saint-Denis, Quebec.
- George Prudham b. 1904 first elected in 1949 as Liberal member for Edmonton West, Alberta.
- Matthew William Pruyn b. 1819 first elected in 1885 as Conservative member for Lennox, Ontario.

== Pu ==
- David Vaughan Pugh b. 1907 first elected in 1958 as Progressive Conservative member for Okanagan Boundary, British Columbia.
- William Pugsley b. 1850 first elected in 1907 as Liberal member for City and County of St. John, New Brunswick.
- Patrick Purcell b. 1833 first elected in 1887 as Liberal member for Glengarry, Ontario.
- Gordon Purdy b. 1888 first elected in 1935 as Liberal member for Colchester—Hants, Nova Scotia.
- Alfred Putnam b. 1836 first elected in 1887 as Conservative member for Hants, Nova Scotia.
- Harold Putnam b. 1868 first elected in 1921 as Liberal member for Colchester, Nova Scotia.
- Arthur Puttee b. 1868 first elected in 1900 as Labour Party member for Winnipeg, Manitoba.
