= List of members of the Canadian House of Commons with military service (P) =

Name	Elected party	Constituency	Elected date	Military service
John Pallett	Progressive Conservative	Peel	March 22, 1954	Canadian Army (1942–1946)
Roger Parizeau	Progressive Conservative	Lac-Saint-Jean	March 31, 1958	Canadian Army (1939–1945)
William Albert Patterson	Conservative	Colchester	March 5, 1891	Militia
William Hector Payne	Progressive Conservative	Coast—Capilano	March 31, 1958	Canadian Army (1941–1945)
George Randolph Pearkes	Progressive Conservative	Nanaimo	June 11, 1945	Canadian Army (1915–1945)
Lester Bowles Pearson	Liberal	Algoma East	October 25, 1948	Canadian Army (1914–1917), Royal Flying Corps (1917–1918)
Cyrus Wesley Peck	Unionist	Skeena	December 17, 1917	Canadian Army (1914–1925)
Charles Alphonse Pantaléon Pelletier	Liberal	Kamouraska	February 17, 1869	Militia
Irénée Pelletier	Liberal	Sherbrooke	October 30, 1972	Royal Canadian Air Force (1960–1962)
Louis-Philippe Pelletier	Conservative	Quebec County	September 21, 1911	Militia
Lawrence T. Pennell	Liberal	Brant—Haldimand	June 18, 1962	Royal Canadian Air Force
Robert Pennock	Progressive Conservative	Etobicoke North	September 4, 1984	Canadian Army (1951–1952), Royal Canadian Navy (1954–1968)
Arnold Peters	Cooperative Commonwealth Federation	Timiskaming	June 10, 1957	Royal Canadian Air Force (1942–1945)
Orville H. Phillips	Progressive Conservative	Prince	June 10, 1957	Royal Canadian Air Force (1942–1945)
Elmore Philpott	Liberal	Vancouver South	August 10, 1953	Canadian Army (1915–1919)
Bernard Pilon	Liberal	Chambly—Rouville	June 18, 1962	Canadian Army (1941–1945)
Alfred Pinsonneault	Conservative	Laprairie	September 20, 1867	Militia (1855–1862)
D'Arcy Plunkett	Conservative	Victoria	December 6, 1928	Royal Flying Corps
William Albert Pommer	Liberal	Lisgar	August 10, 1953	Canadian Army
John Henry Pope	Liberal-Conservative	Compton	September 20, 1867	Militia
John Poupore	Conservative	Pontiac	September 17, 1878	Militia (1869-)
Charles Gavan Power	Liberal	Quebec South	December 17, 1917	Canadian Army (1915–1918)
Francis "Frank" Gavan Power	Liberal	Quebec South	September 26, 1955	Canadian Army
Russ Powers	Liberal	Ancaster--Dundas--Flamborough--Westdale	June 28, 2004	Canadian Forces Land Force Command
Robert John Pratt	Progressive Conservative	Jacques Cartier—Lasalle	June 10, 1957	Canadian Army (-1942), Royal Canadian Navy (-1946)
David Price	Progressive Conservative	Compton—Stanstead	June 2, 1997	Canadian Army (1959–1965)
William Price	Conservative	Quebec West	October 26, 1908	Canadian Army
Edward Gawler Prior	Conservative	Victoria	January 23, 1888	Canadian Army
Robert William Prittie	New Democratic	Burnaby—Richmond	June 18, 1962	Royal Canadian Air Force (1938–1945)
John Oliver Probe	Cooperative Commonwealth Federation	Regina City	June 11, 1945	Canadian Army (1941–1944)
David Vaughan Pugh	Progressive Conservative	Okanagan Boundary	March 31, 1958	Canadian Army
