= Bridgit Fitzgerald =

Canadian philanthropist (died 1898)

Bridgit Fitzgerald (died 19 September 1898) was a Canadian of Irish descent who was a prominent patron of the English-speaking culture within the Irish community of Quebec City, in the 19th century. Fitzgerald married William Power (Sr.) on September 27, 1843, in Sainte-Foy, Quebec, Canada.

Her son was the Canadian politician William Power. She was also the grandmother of the Hon. Charles Gavan Power and William Gerard Power, both Canadian politicians.

She travelled to Boston, Massachusetts for the christening of her nephew John F. Fitzgerald, who, in turn, was maternal grandfather of US President John F. Kennedy.

== Death ==
Bridgit died at age 78, on 19 September 1898. She was buried at the Parish of St-Colomb-de-Sillery, Québec.
