= Québec-Ouest =

Québec-Ouest may refer to:

- Quebec West, a former federal electoral district in the area of Quebec City
- Québec-Ouest (provincial electoral district), a former provincial electoral district in the area of Quebec City
