= Félix Carbray =

Canadian politician

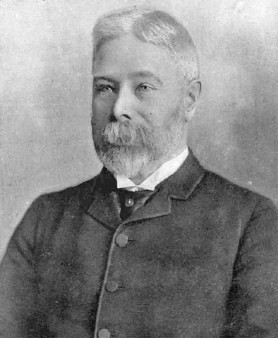

Member of the Legislative Assembly of Quebec for Québec-Ouest
- In office 1881–1886
- Preceded by: Arthur H. Murphy
- Succeeded by: Owen Murphy
- In office 1892–1900
- Preceded by: Owen Murphy
- Succeeded by: John Gabriel Hearn

Personal details
- Born: December 22, 1835 Holland Farm on the outskirts of Quebec City, Lower Canada
- Died: December 20, 1907 (aged 71) Quebec City, Quebec
- Party: Conservative

Félix Carbray (December 22, 1835 – December 20, 1907) was a Canadian politician.

He was elected to the Legislative Assembly of Quebec in the 1881 election for the riding of Québec-Ouest. A Conservative, he was defeated in 1886. He was acclaimed in 1892 and re-elected in 1897. He did not run in 1900.
