= Richard Alleyn =

Canadian politician

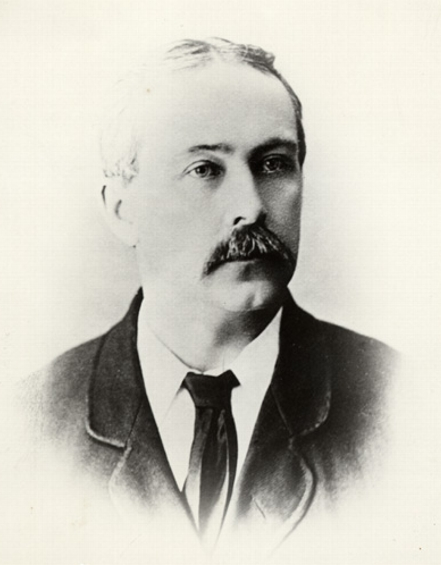

Member of the Legislative Assembly of Quebec for Québec-Ouest
- In office 1877–1878
- Preceded by: John Hearn
- Succeeded by: Arthur H. Murphy

Personal details
- Born: April 29, 1835 Trobolgan, Ireland
- Died: August 16, 1883 (aged 48) Rimouski, Quebec
- Party: Conservative
- Relations: Charles Joseph Alleyn, brother

Richard Alleyn (April 29, 1835 – August 16, 1883) was an Irish-born lawyer, judge, educator and political figure in Quebec. He represented Québec-Ouest in the Legislative Assembly of Quebec from 1877 to 1878 as a Conservative.

He was born in Trabolgan, County Cork, the son of Richard Israël Alleyn and Margaret O'Donovan, and came to Lower Canada with his family in 1838. Alleyn was educated at the Séminaire de Québec and the Université Laval. He was called to the Lower Canada bar in 1857 and set up a practice at Quebec City with Alexandre Chauveau. He was crown attorney there for several years. Alleyn served on the municipal council from 1863 to 1865. In 1873, he was named Queen's Counsel. He was elected to the Quebec assembly in an 1877 by-election but was defeated when he ran for reelection in 1878. Alleyn became a professor of criminal law at Université Laval in 1878. In 1881, he was named judge in the Quebec Superior Court for Rimouski district. Alleyn served as an officer in the militia, reaching the rank of lieutenant-colonel. He was married twice: to Louisa Joséphine Lindsay in 1865 and to Catherine-Louise-Josephte, the daughter of Alexandre-René Chaussegros de Léry, in 1877. He died in Rimouski at the age of 48.

His brother Charles Joseph served in the legislative assembly for the Province of Canada and was mayor of Quebec City.
