= John Charles Kaine =

Canadian politician

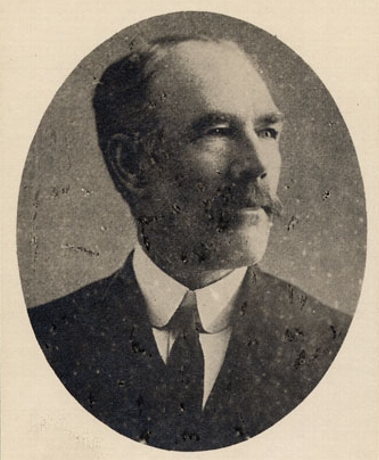

Member of the Legislative Assembly of Quebec for Québec-Ouest
- In office 1904–1915
- Preceded by: John Gabriel Hearn
- Succeeded by: Martin Madden

Member of the Legislative Council of Quebec for Stadacona
- In office 1915–1923
- Preceded by: John Sharples Jr.
- Succeeded by: William Gerard Power

Personal details
- Born: October 18, 1854 Quebec City
- Died: April 1, 1923 (aged 68) Quebec City
- Resting place: Sillery
- Party: Liberal
- Cabinet: Minister without Portfolio (1920-1923)

John Charles Kaine (1854–1923) was a Quebec politician. He was born in the parish of Notre-Dame de Québec, October 18, 1854, son of John Kaine and Ellen McGowan.

He studied at the Commercial Academy of Quebec.

Kaine entered the business world in 1886, and was a ship-owner and wood merchant. He became president of the Kaine and Bird transport company. He represented the Lake Champlain Transportation Co., and Burleigh and Weeks, a wood-pulp import company in Whitehall, New York.

John Charles Kaine was elected the Liberal member for Québec-Ouest in 1904. He was sworn in as a Minister Without Portfolio in the Gouin cabinet on January 3, 1906, and was re-elected in 1908, and 1912. His seat became vacant when he was named Legislative Councillor for Stadacona on April 23, 1915. He became Minister Without Portfolio in the Taschereau cabinet on July 9, 1920.

While sitting as a Member of the Assembly, Kaine organized independent Members to form a voting bloc that for a time held the balance of power. He was the last Member to sit in all three Chambers of the Parliament of Quebec: the Legislative Assembly, the Legislative Council and the Executive Council. (The Legislative Council, formerly the upper house of the provincial parliament, was abolished in 1968, when the Legislative Assembly was renamed the National Assembly.)

John Charles Kaine was President of the St. Patrick's Literary Institute in Quebec; he published The Irish Man in Canada (1907).

He was married in Quebec, at St. Patrick's Church, on January 27, 1879, to Theresa Maria Tucker, daughter of James Tucker and Maria Hurst. And later, also in Quebec City, on February 16, 1904, to Helen Smith, widow of Robert Beat.

John Charles Kaine died in office in Quebec, on April 1, 1923, at the age of 68 years and six months. He was buried in St. Patrick's Church cemetery, in Sillery (part of modern-day Quebec City), on April 4, 1923.
