= J.-Wilfrid Dufresne =

Canadian politician (1911–1982)

Member of Parliament for Quebec West
- In office 10 August 1953 – 9 June 1957
- Preceded by: Charles Parent
- Succeeded by: René Bégin

Personal details
- Born: 5 August 1911 Quebec City, Quebec, Canada
- Died: 30 June 1982 (aged 70) Quebec City, Quebec
- Party: Progressive Conservative
- Spouse(s): Julienne Manzerolle (m. 28 November 1936)
- Profession: Interior decorator, promoter, public servant, teacher

J.-Wilfrid Dufresne (5 August 1911 – 30 June 1982) was a Progressive Conservative party member of the House of Commons of Canada. Born in Quebec City, Quebec, he held various other jobs such as interior decorator, promoter, teacher, a Quebec provincial public servant, a federal statistician for the Minimum Wages Commission.

Dufresne attended schools at the Saint-Sauveur orphanage, Saint-Sauveur Academy and St. Mary's College.

He was elected to Parliament at the Quebec West riding in the 1953 general election as a Progressive Conservative, defeating Liberal party incumbent Charles Parent. Dufresne served only one term in Parliament before Liberal René Bégin won the riding back in the 1957 election. His next attempt to win a House of Commons seat was made in the 1972 election where he was a Social Credit candidate at Langelier riding, but was unable to unseat incumbent Jean Marchand. His last federal campaign was in the 1979 election at Québec-Est where he returned to the Progressive Conservative party, but was again unsuccessful.

== Electoral record ==
1953 Canadian federal election: Quebec West
Party	Candidate	Votes
Progressive Conservative	J.-Wilfrid Dufresne	8,464
Independent Liberal	René Bégin	6,034
Liberal	Charles Parent	4,612
Independent Liberal	François Fournier	3,910

1957 Canadian federal election: Quebec West
Party	Candidate	Votes
Liberal	René Bégin	11,828
Progressive Conservative	J.-Wilfrid Dufresne	10,981
Independent Liberal	Marcel Turgeon	1,520
Social Credit	Jules Thérien	529
