= Thomas McGreevy =

Canadian politician and contractor

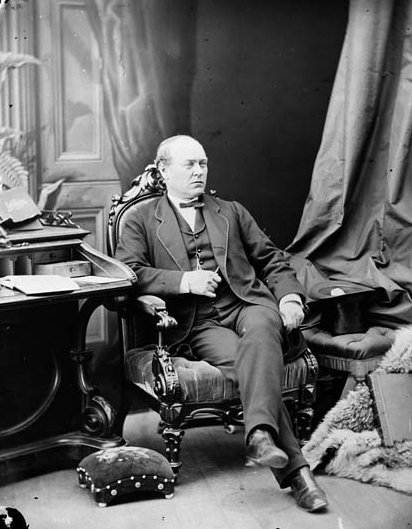

Member of the Canadian Parliament for Quebec West
- In office 1867–1891
- Succeeded by: John Hearn
- In office 1895–1896
- Preceded by: John Hearn
- Succeeded by: Richard Reid Dobell

Member of the Legislative Council of Quebec for Stadacona
- In office 1867–1874
- Succeeded by: John Sharples, Sr.

Personal details
- Born: 29 July 1825 Quebec City, Lower Canada
- Died: 2 January 1897 (aged 71) Quebec City, Quebec
- Party: Liberal-Conservative

Thomas McGreevy (29 July 1825 – 2 January 1897) was a Canadian politician and contractor.

Born in Quebec, he was the son of Robert McGreevy, a blacksmith, and Rose Smith. In 1867 he was elected Member of Parliament (MP) for Quebec West (as a liberal conservative), and was re-elected in 1872, 1874, 1878, 1882, 1887 and 1891.

He was expelled from the House of Commons for corruption on 29 September 1891, and following his conviction for defrauding the government was sentenced to a year in prison. (The other MPs to be expelled from the Canadian House of Commons are Louis Riel [twice] and Quebec communist Fred Rose.) Following his release on 1 March 1894, he was re-elected to Parliament in 1895.

He was the contractor for the building of the Parliament of Canada.

He was married three times: to Mary Ann Rourke on 13 July 1857, to Bridget Caroline Nolan on 4 February 1861 and to Mary Georgina Woolsey on 30 January 1867. He had several children by Mary Georgina including Stella and Herbert. Mary Georgina Woolsey came from a wealthy Quebec family, now most famous for being the subject of William Berczy's portrait of The Woolsey Family (1809).

== Electoral record ==
1867 Canadian federal election: Quebec West/Québec-Oest
Party	Candidate	Votes
Liberal–Conservative	Thomas McGreevy	acclaimed
Source: Canadian Elections Database

1872 Canadian federal election: Quebec West
Party	Candidate	Votes
Liberal–Conservative	Thomas McGreevy	742
Unknown	John O'Farrell	435

1874 Canadian federal election: Quebec West
Party	Candidate	Votes
Liberal–Conservative	Thomas McGreevy	587
Unknown	John O'Farrell	403

1878 Canadian federal election: Quebec West
Party	Candidate	Votes
Liberal–Conservative	Thomas McGreevy	acclaimed

1882 Canadian federal election: Quebec West
Party	Candidate	Votes
Liberal–Conservative	Thomas McGreevy	612
Unknown	Humphrey	444

1887 Canadian federal election: Quebec West
Party	Candidate	Votes
Liberal–Conservative	Thomas McGreevy	816
Unknown	M.A. Hearn	770

1891 Canadian federal election: Quebec West
Party	Candidate	Votes
Liberal–Conservative	Thomas McGreevy	885
Unknown	M.A. Hearn	832

By-election on 17 April 1895 On Hearn's death, 17 May 1894
Party	Candidate	Votes
Liberal–Conservative	Thomas McGreevy	acclaimed

1896 Canadian federal election: Quebec West
Party	Candidate	Votes
Liberal	Richard Reid Dobell	1,057
Liberal–Conservative	Thomas McGreevy	826
