= Quebec West and South =

Former federal electoral district in Quebec, Canada

Quebec electoral district

Defunct federal electoral district
- Legislature: House of Commons
- District created: 1933
- District abolished: 1947
- First contested: 1935
- Last contested: 1945

Quebec West and South (French: Québec-Ouest-et-Sud) was a federal electoral district in Quebec, Canada, that was represented in the House of Commons of Canada from 1935 to 1949.

This riding was created in 1933 from Quebec South and Quebec West ridings.

It was abolished in 1947 when it was merged into Quebec West riding.

== Members of Parliament ==
This riding elected the following members of Parliament:

| Parliament | Years | Member | Party |
|---|---|---|---|
Quebec West and South; Riding created from Quebec South and Quebec West
| 18th | 1935–1940 | Charles Parent | Liberal |
| 19th | 1940–1944 | Charles Parent | Liberal |
| 19th | 1944–1945 | Charles Parent | Independent Liberal |
| 20th | 1945–1949 | Charles Parent | Independent Liberal |
Riding dissolved into Quebec West

== Election results ==
1935 Canadian federal election
| Party | Candidate | Votes |
|---|---|---|
| Liberal | Charles Parent | 10,466 |
| Conservative | Maurice Dupré | 8,720 |

1940 Canadian federal election
| Party | Candidate | Votes |
|---|---|---|
| Liberal | Charles Parent | 12,010 |
| National Government | Maurice Dupré | 8,003 |

1945 Canadian federal election
| Party | Candidate | Votes |
|---|---|---|
| Independent Liberal | Charles Parent | 10,541 |
| Independent | Joseph-Napoléon Parent | 4,991 |
| Social Credit | Joseph-Alexandre Bouchard | 3,876 |
| Labour | Joseph Coulombe | 423 |
| Co-operative Commonwealth | Lucien Lepinay | 236 |

== See also ==
- List of Canadian electoral districts
- Historical federal electoral districts of Canada
