= Charles Macpherson Dobell =

Canadian soldier

Lieutenant-General Sir Charles Macpherson Dobell KCB CMG DSO
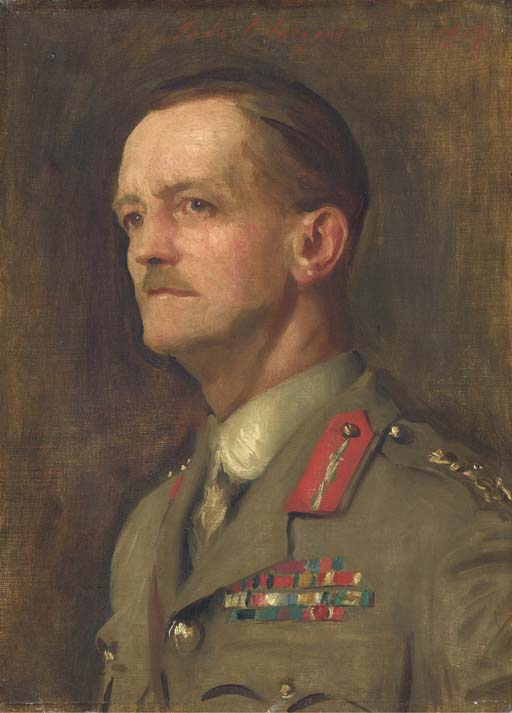
- Portrait by John Singer Sargent, oil on canvas, 1919
- Born: 22 June 1869; Quebec City, Quebec
- Died: 17 October 1954 (aged 85)
- Relatives: Richard Reid Dobell (father); Sir David Lewis Macpherson (grandfather)
- Military career
- Allegiance: United Kingdom
- Branch: British Army
- Service years: 1890–c. 1920
- Rank: Lieutenant-General
- Commands: Eastern Force
- Conflicts: Second Boer War; Boxer Rebellion; First World War: Kamerun campaign; First Battle of Gaza; Second Battle of Gaza
- Awards: Knight Commander of the Order of the Bath; Companion of the Order of St Michael and St George; Distinguished Service Order; Mentioned in Despatches; Legion of Honour (France)

Lieutenant-General Sir Charles Macpherson Dobell, KCB, CMG, DSO (22 June 1869 – 17 October 1954) was a Canadian soldier who served with the Royal Welch Fusiliers of the British Army.

== Military career ==
Born in Quebec City, the son of Richard Reid Dobell, an MP, and a grandson of Senator Sir David Lewis Macpherson, Dobell was educated at the Rev. Canon Von Iffland's Private School, the Quebec High School and Charterhouse School in England.

Dobell graduated as a second lieutenant from the Royal Military College of Canada (college #221) on 20 August 1890. He was a lieutenant in the Hazara expedition of 1891 and was appointed adjutant on 7 November 1896. He took part with the International Forces in the occupation of the island of Crete, when he was promoted to captain on 22 February 1899, and received the brevet promotion to major the following month.

He served in China during the Boxer Rebellion in 1900, as adjutant of the 2nd battalion of his regiment. After transferring to South Africa he served in the Second Boer War in command of a Regiment of Mounted Infantry, and took part in the relief of Kimberley. He subsequently took part in operations in the Orange Free State February to May 1900, including the battles of Paardeberg (February 1900), Poplar Grove, Driefontein (March 1900), Houtnek, Vet River and Zand River (May 1900); then operations in the Transvaal Colony in May and June 1900, including the battles of Johannesburg and Pretoria (May 1900), Diamond Hill (June 1900) and Wittebergen (July 1900). For his service he was awarded the Distinguished Service Order (DSO). After return to the United Kingdom he attended Staff College, Camberley.

After serving in Nigeria, he was promoted from supernumerary captain to captain on 5 October 1906 and made a general staff officer, grade 3 (GSO3), in succession to Major Clifford Coffin, and was promoted to brevet lieutenant colonel in September 1907. After serving as a general staff officer, grade 2 (GSO2) at the War Office, he was promoted to brevet colonel and became an aide-de-camp to King George V in November 1910. In September 1913 he was promoted to colonel and was also granted the temporary rank of brigadier general while employed as inspector general of the West African Frontier Force.

During the First World War, Dobell fought in the Kamerun campaign, was promoted to major general in June 1915 "for distinguished service in the Field", and was later promoted to lieutenant general. He served with the Egyptian Expeditionary Force in the Sinai and Palestine campaign under General Sir Archibald Murray, but they were both replaced in 1917. Following the second defeat, General Murray relieved Dobell of his command on April 21, 1917, replacing him with Sir Philip Chetwode. Shortly thereafter, the British government realized the true extent of the failures and removed Murray as well, replacing him with General Sir Edmund Allenby in June 1917.

In the 1915 New Year Honours, Dobell was made a Companion of the Order of St Michael and St George. He was also made a Knight Commander of the Order of the Bath.

He retired from the army in October 1923 and was granted the honorary rank of lieutenant general. He was appointed colonel of the Royal Welch Fusiliers in February 1926, in succession to Lieutenant General Sir Francis Lloyd.
