= René Bégin =

Canadian politician (1912–1981)

Member of the Canadian Parliament for Quebec West
- In office 1957–1958
- Preceded by: J.-Wilfrid Dufresne
- Succeeded by: J.-Eugène Bissonnette

Personal details
- Born: July 2, 1912 Quebec City, Quebec, Canada
- Died: November 18, 1981 (aged 69) Quebec City, Quebec, Canada
- Party: Liberal
- Occupation: wholesaler

René Bégin (July 2, 1912 – November 18, 1981) was a Canadian politician and wholesaler. He was elected to the House of Commons of Canada in the 1957 election as a Member of the Liberal Party for the riding of Quebec West. He lost the 1953 election as an Independent Liberal candidate and lost the elections of 1958 and 1962 as a Member of the Liberal Party. He was born in Quebec City, Quebec, Canada.

1953 Canadian federal election: Quebec West
Party	Candidate	Votes
Progressive Conservative	J.-Wilfrid Dufresne	8,464
Independent Liberal	René Bégin	6,034
Liberal	Charles Parent	4,612
Independent Liberal	François Fournier	3,910

1957 Canadian federal election: Quebec West
Party	Candidate	Votes
Liberal	René Bégin	11,828
Progressive Conservative	J.-Wilfrid Dufresne	10,981
Independent Liberal	Marcel Turgeon	1,520
Social Credit	Jules Thérien	529

1958 Canadian federal election: Quebec West
Party	Candidate	Votes
Progressive Conservative	J.-Eugène Bissonnette	14,223
Liberal	René Bégin	12,357
Social Credit	Jules Thérien	1,054

1962 Canadian federal election: Quebec West
Party	Candidate	Votes
Social Credit	Lucien Plourde	16,169
Liberal	René Bégin	6,306
Progressive Conservative	J.-Eugène Bissonnette	4,575
New Democratic	Gérard Demers	360
Ouvrier indépendant	Adélard Patry	152
