= Robert Chambers (Quebec politician) =

Canadian politician (1834–1886)

Mayor Robert Chambers
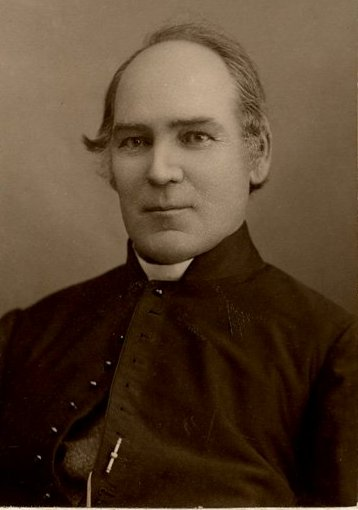

Mayor of Quebec City
- In office 6 May 1878 – 3 May 1880
- Preceded by: Owen Murphy
- Succeeded by: Jean-Docile Brousseau

Personal details
- Born: 1834
- Died: 1886 (age c. 52)

Robert Chambers (1834–1886) was a Canadian politician, serving as Mayor of Quebec City from May 1878 to May 1880.
