= Jacques Flynn =

Canadian politician (1915–2000)

The Honourable Jacques Flynn PC QC OC

Minister of Justice Attorney General of Canada
- In office June 4, 1979 – March 2, 1980
- Prime Minister: Joe Clark
- Preceded by: Marc Lalonde
- Succeeded by: Jean Chrétien

Minister of Mines and Technical Surveys
- In office December 28, 1961 – July 12, 1962
- Prime Minister: John Diefenbaker
- Preceded by: Walter Dinsdale (acting)
- Succeeded by: Hugh John Flemming (acting)

Senator for Rougemont, Quebec
- In office November 9, 1962 – August 22, 1990
- Appointed by: John Diefenbaker
- Preceded by: Henri Courtemanche
- Succeeded by: John Sylvain

Member of Parliament for Quebec South
- In office March 31, 1958 – June 17, 1962
- Preceded by: Frank Power
- Succeeded by: Jean-Charles Cantin

Personal details
- Born: August 22, 1915 Saint-Hyacinthe, Quebec, Canada
- Died: September 21, 2000 (aged 85) Quebec City, Quebec, Canada
- Party: Progressive Conservative
- Spouse: Renée Henri des Rivières (m. 1945)
- Children: 2
- Relatives: Edmund James Flynn (grandfather)
- Education: Université Laval
- Profession: Lawyer

Jacques Flynn PC OC QC (August 22, 1915 – September 21, 2000) was a Canadian lawyer and federal politician, serving in both the House of Commons and Senate.

Flynn was born in Saint-Hyacinthe, Quebec, the grandson of the Premier of Quebec Edmund James Flynn. He both graduated in law from Université Laval and was called to the Quebec Bar in 1939.

A Progressive Conservative, Flynn ran unsuccessfully to represent the riding of Quebec South in the House of Commons in the 1957 election; he came second to the Liberal incumbent, Frank Power. He narrowly defeated Power in a rematch in Quebec South in the 1958 election when John Diefenbaker led the PC Party to a landslide victory.

Flynn became Deputy Speaker of the House of Commons of Canada in 1960. In December 1961, Prime Minister Diefenbaker brought Flynn into the Cabinet of Canada as Minister of Mines and Technical Surveys, a position he held until losing his seat to Liberal challenger Jean-Charles Cantin in the 1962 election that reduced the Conservatives to a minority government. Later that year, he was appointed to the Senate.

Flynn served as Leader of the Opposition in the Senate from 1967 until the 1979 election that brought the Tories back to power. Prime Minister Joe Clark brought Flynn into Cabinet as Minister of Justice. It was unusual for a senator to hold such a senior cabinet portfolio, but as the Conservatives were elected with virtually no representation from Quebec, it was necessary to attempt to achieve regional balance in Cabinet by appointing senators to the body.

With the defeat of the Clark government to Pierre Trudeau's Liberals in the 1980 election, Flynn returned to the position of Leader of the Opposition in the Senate. He continued in that role until the PCs, now led by Brian Mulroney, returned to government in 1984. He remained in the Upper House until his retirement in 1990.

In 1993, he was made an Officer of the Order of Canada.

Government offices
Preceded by Walter Dinsdale	Minister of Mines and Technical Surveys; 1961–1962	Succeeded by Hugh Flemming
Preceded by Alfred Johnson Brooks	Leader of the Opposition in the Senate of Canada; 1967–1979	Succeeded by Ray Perrault
Preceded by Ray Perrault	Leader of the Government in the Senate; 1979–1980	Succeeded by Ray Perrault
Preceded by Marc Lalonde	Minister of Justice; 1979–1980	Succeeded by Jean Chrétien
Preceded by Ray Perrault	Leader of the Opposition in the Senate of Canada; 1980–1984	Succeeded by Allan MacEachen
