= Owen Murphy (politician) =

Canadian politician (1827–1895)

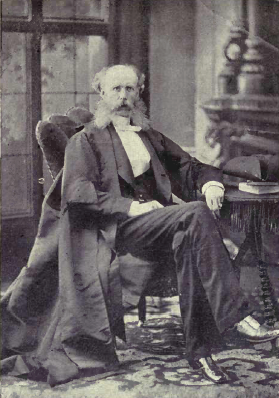

Member of the Legislative Assembly of Quebec for Québec-Ouest
- In office 1886–1892
- Preceded by: Félix Carbray
- Succeeded by: Félix Carbray

Mayor of Quebec City
- In office 1874–1878
- Preceded by: Pierre Garneau
- Succeeded by: Robert Chambers

Personal details
- Born: 9 December 1827 Stoneham, Lower Canada
- Died: 4 October 1895 (aged 67) Quebec City, Quebec
- Party: Liberal

Owen Murphy (9 December 1827 – 4 October 1895) was a Canadian private banker, insurance agent and politician.

Born in Stoneham, Quebec, the son of Nicholas Murphy and Ellen O'Brien, both of Irish ancestry, he was a member of the Quebec City Council from 1871 to 1874 and was mayor of Quebec City from 1874 to 1878. In the 1881 Quebec election, he ran unsuccessfully as the Liberal candidate in the riding of Québec-Ouest. He was elected in the 1886 election and re-elected in the 1890 election. He died in Quebec City at the age of 68.

Before entering business on his own, he was employed in the lumber exporting business. He was also a director for the Quebec Central Railway. Murphy married Elizabeth Loughry in 1857.
