= Joe Power (ice hockey) =

Canadian ice hockey player and politician

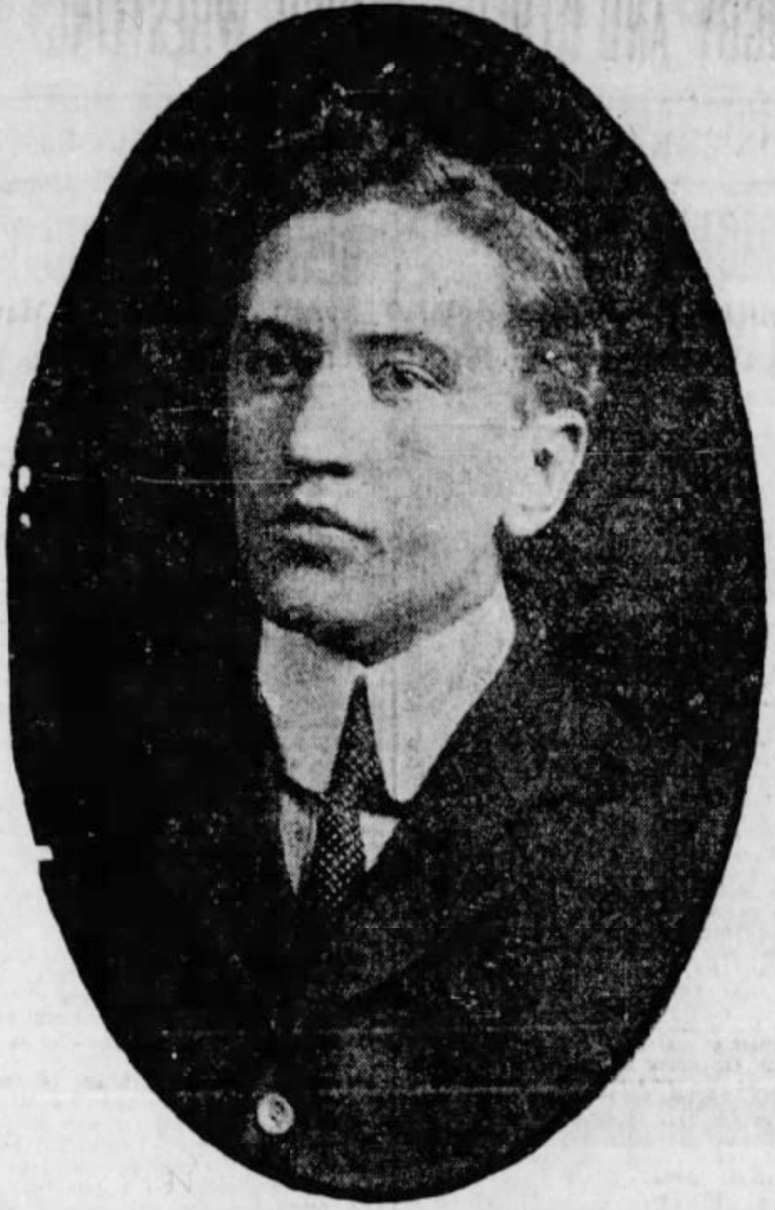
- Born: January 11, 1885 Sillery, Quebec, Canada
- Died: June 1, 1935 (aged 50)
- Height: 5 ft 9 in (175 cm)
- Weight: 165 lb (75 kg; 11 st 11 lb)
- Position: Left wing
- Shot: Left
- Played for: Quebec Bulldogs
- Playing career: 1901–1911

Joseph Ignatius Power (January 11, 1885 – June 1, 1935) was a Canadian politician and ice hockey player, playing the left wing position for the Quebec Bulldogs from 1902 to 1911, and sitting in the Legislative Assembly of Quebec from 1927 until his death.

== Early life ==
Power was born in Sillery, Quebec. His father William Power was a member of Parliament in the House of Commons. One brother William Gerard Power was a member of the Legislative Council of Quebec; another, Charles Gavan Power, played professional ice hockey and became a member of Parliament and later a senator; a third brother, James also played professional ice hockey. He was the uncle of Frank Gavan Power, who also became a member of Parliament.

== Career ==
=== Ice hockey ===
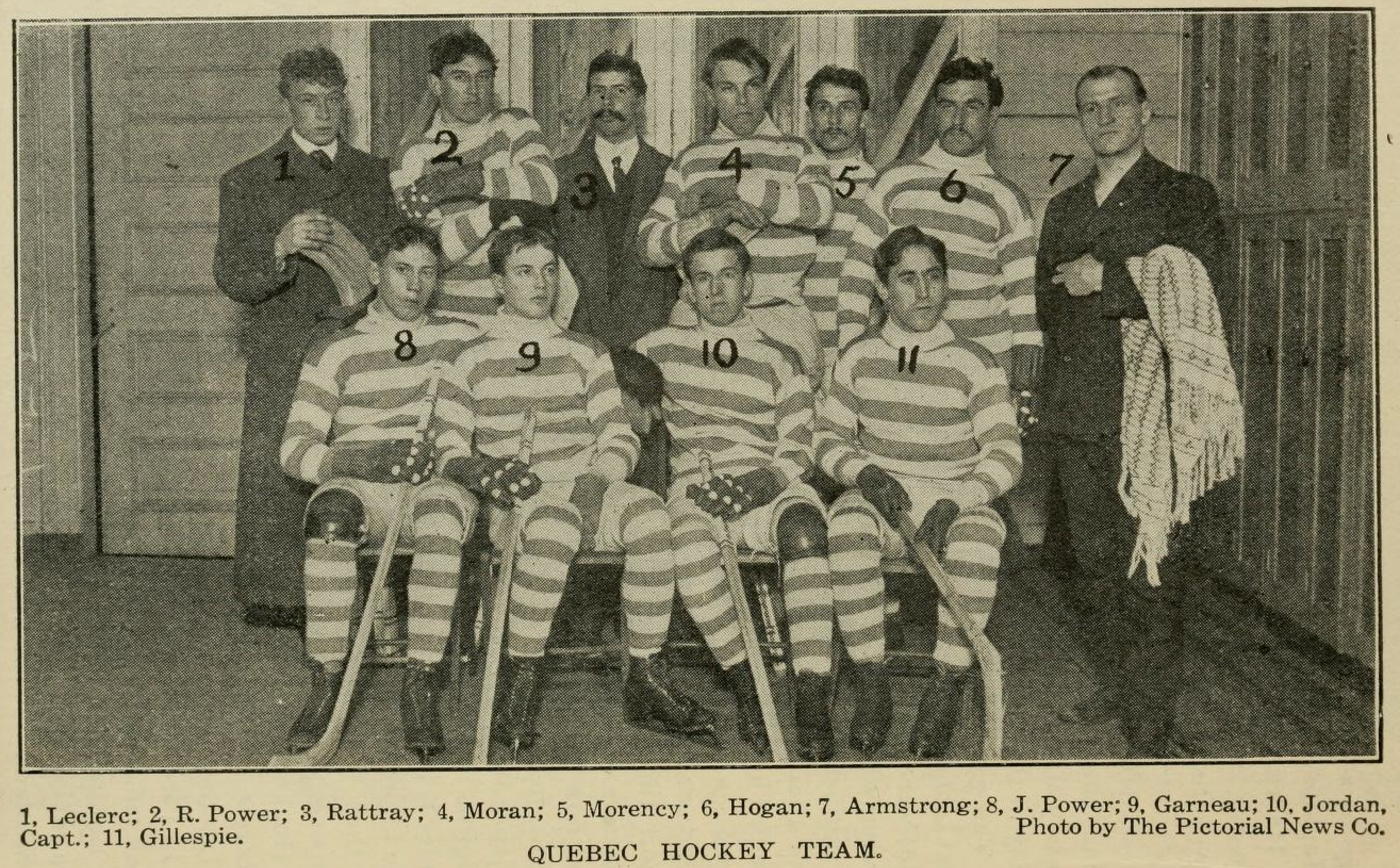
Power (8) sitting at the left corner with the 1905–06 Quebec Hockey Club.

Joe Power joined the Quebec Hockey Club organization in 1901, playing for their "Seconds" team in the CAHL intermediate division. He joined the senior team in 1902, for whom he played until the end of the 1910–11 season. He had his most productive season in 1905–06, scoring 21 goals in ten games. He scored 12 goals in ten games in 1907–08.

Power was also known for his quick wit and humour in the classroom which led to the nickname his teacher gave him, "Joe the joker".

=== Politics ===
He was elected in the 1927 Quebec general election as the Liberal member for Québec-Ouest. He was re-elected in 1931, and died in office.
