= John Sharples Jr. =

Canadian politician

John Sharples
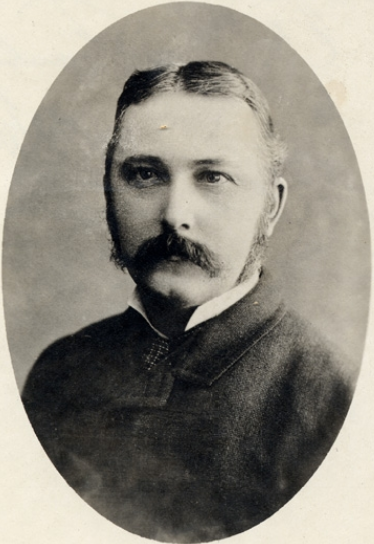

Member of the Legislative Council of Quebec for Stadacona
- In office 1893–1913
- Preceded by: John Roche
- Succeeded by: John Charles Kaine

Personal details
- Born: 24 January 1847 Quebec City, Canada East
- Died: 30 July 1913 (aged 66) Quebec City, Quebec, Canada
- Party: Conservative
- Relations: John Sharples, father

John Sharples (24 January 1847 – 30 July 1913) was a Canadian business person and politician.

Born in Notre-Dame de Québec, the son of John Sharples and Honoria Ann Alleyn, Sharples was educated at Collège Sainte-Marie in Montreal. In 1871, he joined his father's business. He was also the president of the Union Bank of Canada and of the Chronicle Printing Company. He was a member of the Quebec City Council from 1894 to 1898. He was mayor of Sillery, a post his father also held. He was appointed to the Legislative Council of Quebec for Stadacona in 1893. He served until his death in 1913. He was made a Knight of Order of St. Gregory the Great by Pope Pius X in 1907.
