= John Hearn (politician) =

Canadian politician

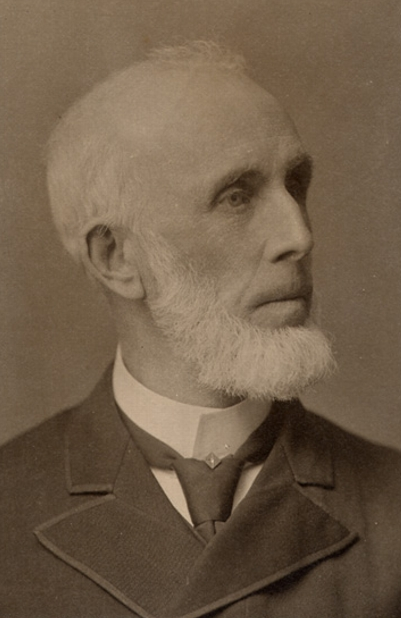

Member of the Canadian Parliament for Quebec West
- In office 1892–1894
- Preceded by: Thomas McGreevy
- Succeeded by: Thomas McGreevy

Member of the Legislative Council of Quebec for Stadacona
- In office 1877–1892
- Preceded by: John Sharples, Sr.
- Succeeded by: John Roche

Member of the Legislative Assembly of Quebec for Quebec West
- In office 1867–1877
- Succeeded by: Richard Alleyn

Personal details
- Born: 4 January 1827 Waterford (Ireland)
- Died: 17 May 1894 (aged 67) Quebec City, Quebec
- Party: Conservative

John Hearn (4 January 1827 – 17 May 1894) was an Irish-born businessman and political figure in Quebec. He represented Quebec West in the Legislative Assembly of Quebec from 1867 to 1877, Stadacona division in the Legislative Council of Quebec from 1877 to 1892 and Quebec West in the House of Commons of Canada from 1892 to 1894 as a Conservative member.

He was born in Waterford, the son of Thomas Hearn and Catherine Power, and was educated at Meagher’s Academy in Ireland. Hearn came to Quebec City in 1842. He first worked as a clerk for Quebec merchant Hugh Murray before entering business on his own as a ship chandler and grocer, later becoming a real estate agent. In 1849, Hearn married Mary Doran. He was a member of the Quebec municipal council from 1856 to 1865, from 1867 to 1873 and from 1877 to 1894, serving as chairman of the ferry committee and later the finance committee. During his time in office, Hearn mainly represented the interests of his Irish constituents. Hearn resigned his seat in the provincial assembly in 1877 after he was named to the Legislative Council. He was defeated by Thomas McGreevy in the 1891 federal election but elected to the House of Commons in an 1892 by-election held after McGreevy was expelled for corruption. Hearn died in office at Quebec City of tuberculosis at the age of 67.

Hearn was also a director for the St. Lawrence and Témiscouata Railway Company and the Great Northern Railway Company.

His son John Gabriel Hearn also served as a member of the Quebec assembly.

== Electoral record ==
By-election on 26 February 1892 McGreevy was expelled from the House of Commons, 29 September 1891
Party	Candidate	Votes
Conservative	John Hearn	acclaimed
