= J.-Eugène Bissonnette =

Canadian politician (1892–1980)

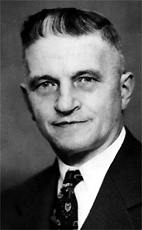

Member of the Canadian Parliament for Quebec West
- In office 1958–1962
- Preceded by: René Bégin
- Succeeded by: Lucien Plourde

Personal details
- Born: March 5, 1892 Sainte-Claire, Quebec, Canada
- Died: September 3, 1980 (aged 88) Quebec City, Quebec, Canada
- Party: Progressive Conservative Party
- Spouse: McClish
- Occupation: physician

J.-Eugène Bissonnette (5 March 1892 – 3 September 1980) was a Quebec-born politician and physician. He was born in Sainte-Claire, Quebec, Canada. He was elected to the House of Commons of Canada as a Member of the Progressive Conservative Party in 1958 to represent the riding of Quebec West. He was defeated in the 1962 election.

== Electoral history ==
1958 Canadian federal election: Quebec West
Party	Candidate	Votes
Progressive Conservative	J.-Eugène Bissonnette	14,223
Liberal	René Bégin	12,357
Social Credit	Jules Thérien	1,054

1962 Canadian federal election: Quebec West
Party	Candidate	Votes
Social Credit	Lucien Plourde	16,169
Liberal	René Bégin	6,306
Progressive Conservative	J.-Eugène Bissonnette	4,575
New Democratic	Gérard Demers	360
Ouvrier indépendant	Adélard Patry	152
