= Jean-Charles Cantin =

Canadian politician

- Official 1968 portrait

Member of Parliament for Quebec South
- In office September 27, 1962 – June 24, 1968
- Preceded by: Jacques Flynn
- Succeeded by: riding dissolved

Member of Parliament for Louis-Hébert
- In office June 25, 1968 – September 1, 1972
- Preceded by: first member
- Succeeded by: Albanie Morin

Personal details
- Born: February 17, 1918 Quebec City, Quebec, Canada
- Died: February 5, 2005 (aged 86)
- Party: Liberal
- Occupation: Lawyer

Jean-Charles Cantin (February 17, 1918 – February 5, 2005) was a Canadian politician, who represented the electoral districts of Quebec South from 1962 to 1968, and Louis-Hébert from 1968 to 1972, in the House of Commons of Canada. He was a member of the Liberal Party.

Cantin, a resident of Quebec City, was a lawyer before entering elected politics.
