= John Sharples Sr. =

Canadian politician

John Sharples

Member of the Legislative Council of Quebec for Stadacona
- In office 1874–1876
- Preceded by: Thomas McGreevy
- Succeeded by: John Hearn

Personal details
- Born: 1814 Lancashire, England
- Died: 19 December 1876 (aged 61–62) Sillery, Quebec, Canada
- Party: Conservative
- Children: John Sharples Jr.
- Occupation: lumberman, shipbuilder and politician

John Sharples (1814 – 19 December 1876) was a Canadian lumberman, shipbuilder and politician.

Born in Lancashire, England, Sharples emigrated to Canada in 1827 settling in Lower Canada. He worked in the lumber industry in Quebec and later built three ships. He was mayor of Sillery. He was also a director and vice-president of the Union Bank of Lower Canada. In 1874, he was appointed to the Legislative Council of Quebec for the division of Stadacona. He died while in office in 1876.

His son, John Sharples Jr., was also a member of the Legislative Council.
