= James Power (ice hockey) =

Canadian ice hockey player

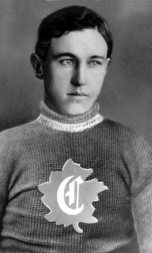
- Born: February 9, 1884; Sillery, Quebec, Canada
- Died: April 6, 1920 (aged 36)
- Height: 5 ft 10 in (178 cm)
- Weight: 160 lb (73 kg; 11 st 6 lb)
- Position: Defence
- Shot: Left
- Played for: Quebec Bulldogs; Canadian Sault Hockey Club; Montreal Canadiens
- Playing career: 1900–1913

James Rockett Power (February 9, 1884 – April 6, 1920) was a Canadian ice hockey player who was active from 1900 to 1913. Rockett Power played on the 1904 Quebec Bulldogs CAHL championship team. That year, Quebec did not challenge for the Stanley Cup. He also played one regular season game for Quebec Bulldogs 1913 Stanley Cup championship team.

== Early life ==
He was born in Sillery to William Power and Susan Winnifred Rockett. His common name, Rockett (sometimes written as "Rocket" in newspaper match reports), came from his mother's maiden name. His father was a member of the House of Commons of Canada, and three of his brothers also had political careers: William Gerard Power was a member of the Legislative Council of Quebec; Joe also played ice hockey and was a member of the Legislative Assembly of Quebec; Charles "Chubby" Power also played ice hockey, and later became a member of the Senate of Canada. Charles' son, Frank Power, also became a member of Parliament, as did Charles' grandson, Lawrence Cannon.

== Ice hockey career ==
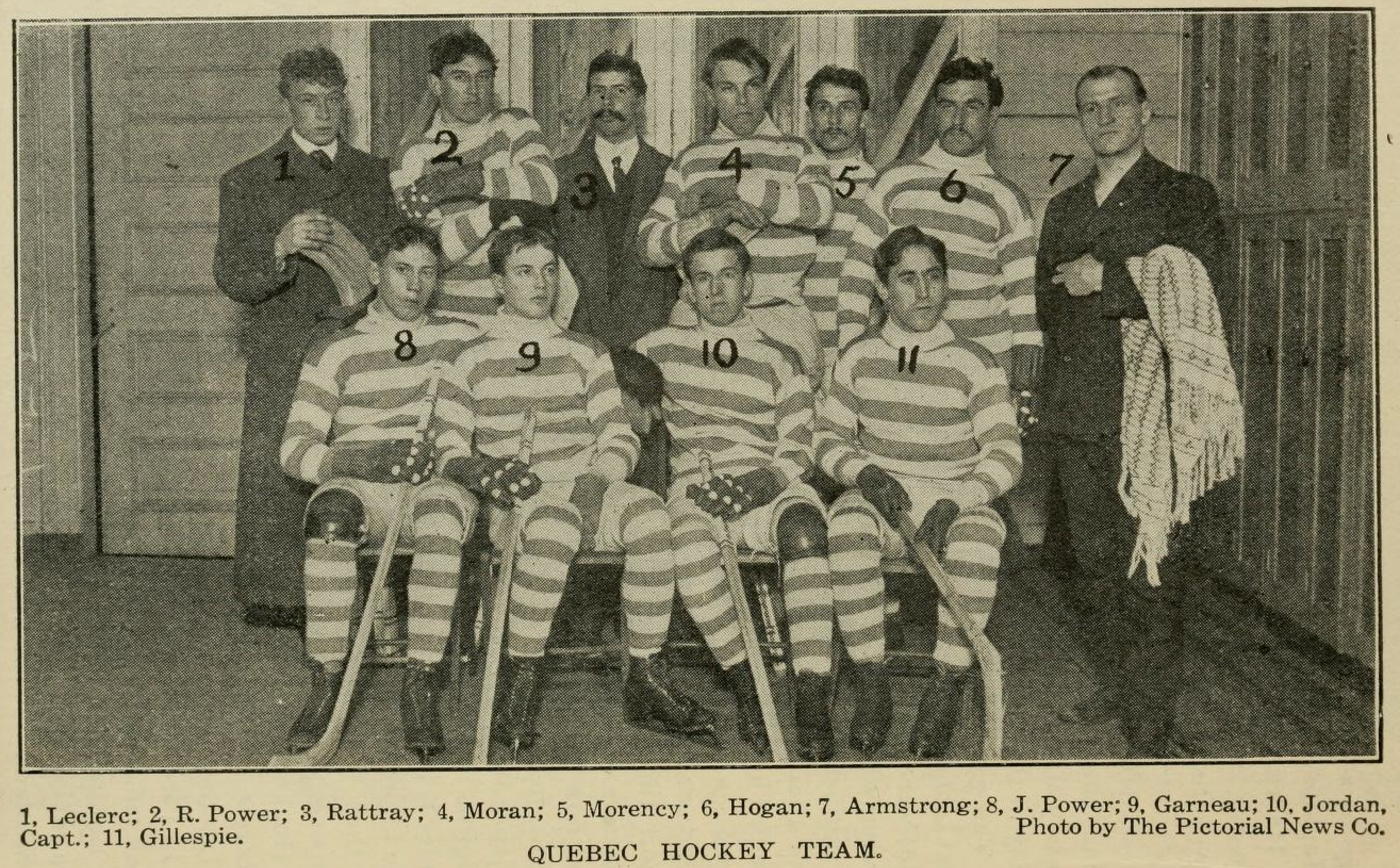
Rockett Power (2) standing at the left with the 1905–06 Quebec Hockey Club.

Power started his playing career with the Quebec Crescents in 1900. He joined the Quebec Hockey Club organization in 1901, playing for the Quebec "Seconds" in the CAHL Intermediate division, playing five games for the Quebec HC in the 1902–03 season. In 1903–04, he played for the Canadian Sault Hockey Club professional team before returning to Quebec in 1904–05. He would go west to play for the Edmonton Thistles in 1905–06, returning to Quebec in 1907–08.

In 1908–09, Power would play for the Edmonton Professional Hockey Club. In 1909, he returned to Quebec, but played for Waterloo of the Ontario Professional Hockey League after the CHA folded. He split 1910–11 between Quebec and the Montreal Canadiens. In 1911–12, he played for New Glasgow of the Maritime Professional Hockey League. He played one final game with Quebec in the 1912–13 season before retiring.
