= Richard Reid Dobell =

Canadian politician

The Honourable Richard Reid Dobell PC
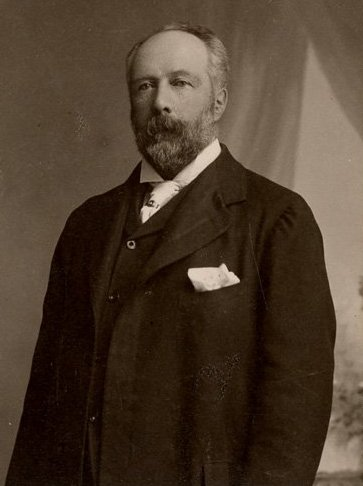

Member of the Canadian Parliament for Quebec West
- In office 1896–1902
- Preceded by: Thomas McGreevy
- Succeeded by: William Power

Personal details
- Born: January 27, 1836 Liverpool, England
- Died: January 11, 1902 (aged 65) Kent, England
- Party: Liberal
- Cabinet: Minister Without Portfolio (1896-1902)

Richard Reid Dobell, PC (January 27, 1836 – January 11, 1902) was a Canadian businessman and politician.

== Biography ==
Born in Liverpool, England, and educated at Liverpool College, he came to the Province of Canada in 1857 and started a lumber business. With his brother-in-law, Thomas Beckett, he founder the firm R. R. Dobell & Co, Quebec, at one time one of the largest of its kind in Canada. He took an active interest in public affairs, was elected President of the Quebec Board of Trade, and was a Harbour Commissioner for that city. He actively promoted the cold storage principle in transatlantic steamers, and was President of the Cold Storage Company of Quebec. Other appointments included Director of the Quebec Railway Bridge Company.

In 1895 he unsuccessfully stood as an independent candidate for the House of Commons of Canada, but the next year was elected as the Liberal candidate for the riding of Quebec West in the 1896 federal election, and was re-elected in 1900. From 1896 to 1902, he was a Minister without Portfolio in the cabinet of Wilfrid Laurier. He was a prominent supporter of the cause of Imperial federation, and was a founder of the British Empire League.

He died on 13 January 1902 of a head injury caused by falling from a horse while visiting his son-in-law at Folkestone, England.

1896 Canadian federal election: Quebec West
Party	Candidate	Votes
Liberal	Richard Reid Dobell	1,057
Liberal–Conservative	Thomas McGreevy	826

1900 Canadian federal election: Quebec West
Party	Candidate	Votes
Liberal	Richard Reid Dobell	1,018
Conservative	Patrick Kirwin	649

== Family ==
Dobell married Elizabeth Frances Macpherson, daughter of Sir David Lewis Macpherson, businessman and later Canadian senator. His son, Charles Macpherson Dobell, was a Major General in the British Army.

== Archives ==
There is a Richard Reid Dobell fonds at Library and Archives Canada.
