= Frank Power (politician) =

Canadian politician

Frank Power MC

Member of Parliament for Quebec South
- In office 26 September 1955 – 30 March 1958
- Preceded by: Charles Gavan Power
- Succeeded by: Jacques Flynn

Personal details
- Born: Joseph Francis Gavan Power; 13 June 1918 Montreal, Quebec, Canada
- Died: 13 July 1973 (aged 55) Ottawa, Ontario, Canada
- Party: Liberal
- Spouse: Diana Hamilton Piers
- Relations: William Power (grandfather); Charles Gavan Power (father); William Gerard Power (uncle); James Power (uncle); Joe Power (uncle); Lawrence Cannon (nephew)
- Profession: Lawyer

Military service
- Allegiance: Canada
- Branch/service: Canadian Army
- Years of service: 1940-1946
- Rank: Lieutenant
- Unit: Royal Rifles of Canada
- Battles/wars: Battle of Hong Kong
- Awards: Military Cross

Joseph Francis Gavan Power (13 June 1918 – 1973) was a Liberal party member of the House of Commons of Canada. He was born in Montreal, Quebec and became a lawyer.

Frank Power was a veteran of the Canadian Army. He became a prisoner of war of the Japanese Imperial Army when Hong Kong fell on Christmas Day of 1941. He like other allied prisoners of war suffered from the inhumane treatment administered by the Japanese, and bore the scars for the remainder of his life.

He was first elected at the Quebec South riding in a 26 September 1955 by-election succeeding his father, Charles Gavan Power, who was appointed to the Senate.

Power was re-elected at Quebec South in the 1957 federal election but defeated by Jacques Flynn of the Progressive Conservative party in the 1958 election.

Power is among the Cannon family members of Parliament, such as his grandfather William Power and his nephew Lawrence Cannon as well as Charles Power, a senior cabinet minister in William Lyon Mackenzie King's cabinet.
