= Charles Joseph Alleyn =

Quebec lawyer and political figure (1817–1890)

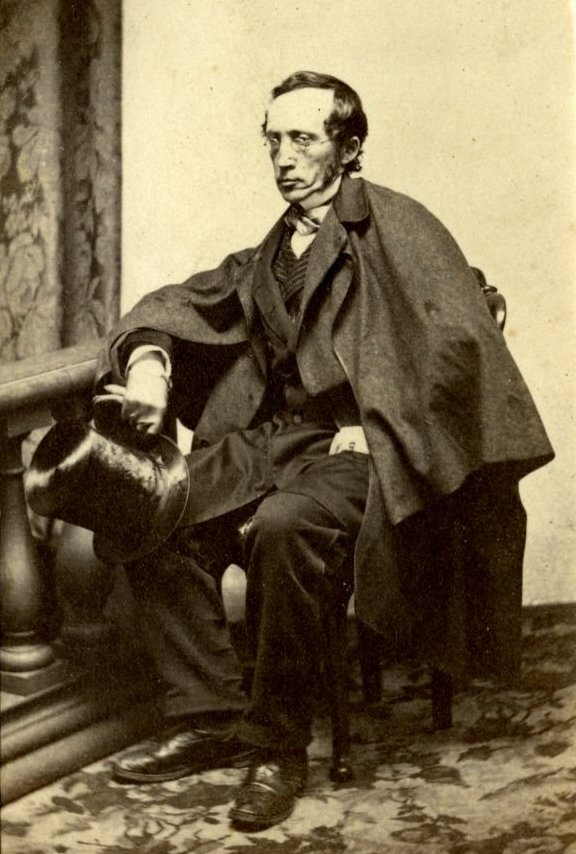

6th Mayor of Quebec City
- In office 1854–1855
- Preceded by: Ulric-Joseph Tessier
- Succeeded by: Joseph Morrin

Personal details
- Born: 19 September 1817 County Cork, Ireland
- Died: 4 April 1890 (aged 72) Quebec City, Quebec

Charles Joseph Alleyn (19 September 1817 – 4 April 1890) was a Quebec lawyer and political figure.

He was born in County Cork, Ireland in 1817 and studied at Clongowes Wood College. Alleyn came to Lower Canada with his family around 1837. He was called to the bar in 1840. He supported the annexation movement in Quebec. He served on the city council for Quebec City from 1851 to 1857, serving as mayor in 1854.

In 1854, he was elected to the Legislative Assembly of the Province of Canada for Quebec City. He supported the abolition of seigneurial tenure, an elected Legislative Council and separate schools. He served on the Executive Council as Commissioner of Public Works from 1857 to 1858 in the ministry of Macdonald-Cartier, and Provincial Secretary from 1858 to 1862 in the similarly constituted ministry of Cartier-Macdonald. In 1866, he resigned from politics to accept an appointment as sheriff for the district of Quebec. He served in this post until his death in Quebec City in 1890. His brother Richard served in the Quebec legislative assembly.
