= Québec-Ouest (provincial electoral district) =

Quebec electoral district

Defunct provincial electoral district
- Legislature: National Assembly of Quebec
- District created: 1867
- District abolished: 1965
- First contested: 1867
- Last contested: 1962

Québec-Ouest was a former provincial electoral district in the Capitale-Nationale region of Quebec, Canada. It was located in the general area of Quebec City. It elected members to the Legislative Assembly of Quebec.

It was created for the 1867 election. Its final election was in 1962. It disappeared in the 1966 election and its successor electoral district was Louis-Hébert.

== Members of the Legislative Assembly ==
- John Hearn, Conservative Party (1867–1877)
- Richard Alleyn, Conservative Party (1877–1878)
- Arthur H. Murphy, Liberal (1878–1881)
- Felix Carbray, Conservative Party (1881–1886)
- Owen Murphy, Liberal (1886–1892)
- Felix Carbray, Conservative Party (1892–1900)
- John Gabriel Hearn, Liberal (1900–1904)
- John Charles Kaine, Liberal (1904–1916)
- Martin Madden, Liberal (1916–1927)
- Joseph Ignatius Power, Liberal (1927–1935)
- Charles Delagrave, Liberal (1935–1944)
- Wilfrid Samson, Liberal (1944–1948)
- Jean-Alphonse Saucier, Union Nationale (1948–1952)
- Jules Savard, Liberal (1952–1956)
- Jean-Paul Galipeault, Liberal (1956–1960)
- Jean Lesage, Liberal (1960–1966)
