= Jean Marchand =

Quebec politician and trade unionist

The Honourable Jean Marchand PC CC
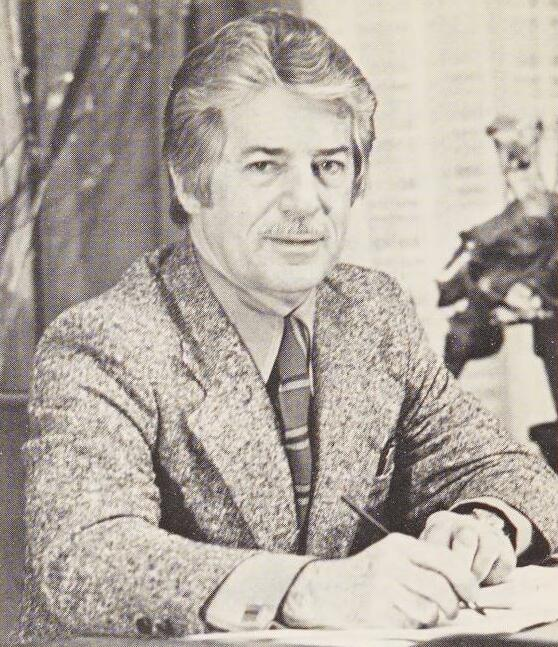
- Marchand, c. 1973

Minister of the Environment
- In office January 22, 1976 – June 30, 1976
- Prime Minister: Pierre Trudeau
- Preceded by: Jeanne Sauvé
- Succeeded by: Roméo LeBlanc (Acting)

Minister of Transport
- In office November 27, 1972 – September 25, 1975
- Prime Minister: Pierre Trudeau
- Preceded by: Don Jamieson
- Succeeded by: Otto Lang

Minister of Regional Economic Expansion
- In office April 1, 1969 – November 26, 1972
- Prime Minister: Pierre Trudeau
- Preceded by: Office Established
- Succeeded by: Don Jamieson

Minister of Forestry and Rural Development
- In office July 6, 1968 – March 31, 1969
- Prime Minister: Pierre Trudeau
- Preceded by: Maurice Sauvé
- Succeeded by: Office Abolished

Secretary of State for Canada
- In office April 20, 1968 – July 5, 1968
- Prime Minister: Pierre Trudeau
- Preceded by: John Joseph Connolly (Acting)
- Succeeded by: Gérard Pelletier

Minister of Manpower and Immigration
- In office October 1, 1966 – July 5, 1968
- Prime Minister: Lester B. Pearson; Pierre Trudeau
- Preceded by: Office Established
- Succeeded by: Allan MacEachen

Minister of Citizenship and Immigration
- In office December 18, 1965 – September 30, 1966
- Prime Minister: Lester B. Pearson
- Preceded by: John Robert Nicholson
- Succeeded by: Office Abolished

Senator for De la Vallière, Quebec
- In office December 9, 1976 – December 15, 1983
- Appointed by: Pierre Trudeau
- Preceded by: Romuald Bourque
- Succeeded by: Pierre de Bané

Member of Parliament for Langelier
- In office June 25, 1968 – October 25, 1976
- Preceded by: Riding created
- Succeeded by: Gilles Lamontagne

Member of Parliament for Quebec West
- In office November 8, 1965 – June 24, 1968
- Preceded by: Lucien Plourde
- Succeeded by: Riding dissolved

Personal details
- Born: December 20, 1918 Champlain, Quebec, Canada
- Died: August 28, 1988 (aged 69) Saint-Augustin-de-Desmaures, Quebec, Canada
- Party: Liberal
- Spouse: Georgette Guertin (m. 1942)
- Education: Université Laval
- Occupation: Unionist
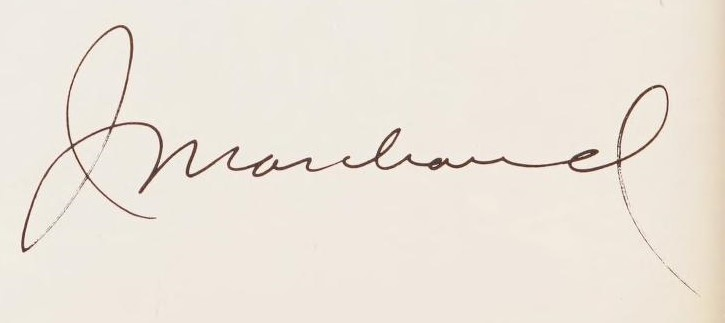
- Signature

Jean Marchand PC CC (December 20, 1918 – August 28, 1988) was a Québécois public figure, trade unionist and politician in Quebec, Canada.

== Life and career ==
During the 1949 Asbestos Strike in Quebec, Marchand led the striking workers as secretary of the Catholic Workers Confederation of Canada (CCCL). It was during this time that he met Pierre Trudeau. Marchand was approached to be a Liberal candidate in the federal election of 1963, but disagreements scuttled a run that year.

In the 1965 federal election, Marchand along with Gérard Pelletier and Pierre Trudeau, were persuaded to run as Liberal candidates. Dubbed the "Three Wise Men" in English, and les trois colombes (three doves) in French, they were seen as destined to shake Canadian politics. Trudeau and Pelletier were provided "safe" ridings in Montreal while Marchand won a hard fight in Quebec City for his riding. Marchand was given a post in the government of Prime Minister Lester B. Pearson promptly after winning the election. Under Pearson, he was appointed Minister of Citizenship and Immigration, and later of Manpower and Immigration by Prime Minister Pearson.

After Charles de Gaulle's infamous cry of "Vive le Québec Libre", the Cabinet met to decide the response. The French-speaking ministers, led by Jean Marchand, wanted Prime Minister Pearson to tell de Gaulle to go home. The English-speaking ministers, on the other hand, did not want to go that far: a public rebuke was sufficient.

When Pearson retired in 1968, Marchand was seen as the most likely and strongest Quebec candidate to replace him as Liberal leader and Prime Minister. However, he declined, claiming that his English was not good enough. It then fell upon Trudeau to make a credible run by a French Canadian for the leadership of the Liberal party. Trudeau won the Liberal leadership and the 1968 federal election. Under Trudeau he held many senior portfolios. He was Minister of Forestry and Rural Development from 1968 to 1969, Minister of Regional Economic Expansion from 1969 to 1972, Minister of Transport from 1972 to 1975, a Minister without portfolio from 1975 to 1976, and Minister of the Environment in 1976.

In October 1976, he resigned his seat in the House of Commons over a disagreement with the government's position regarding the use of the French language by air traffic controllers in Quebec. Presenting himself as an opponent of the separatist program of the Parti Québécois, he stood as a Quebec Liberal Party candidate in the 1976 Quebec provincial election in the riding of Louis-Hébert but was defeated by Claude Morin of the PQ in an election that resulted in the Parti Québécois forming its first government.

One month after his defeat, Marchand was appointed to the Senate by Trudeau and became Speaker of the Senate of Canada in 1980. He resigned from the upper house in December 1983 in order to accept an appointment as president of the Canadian Transport Commission. Marchand was appointed a Companion of the Order of Canada in 1986.

== Electoral Record ==
=== House of Commons, 1965 - 1976 ===
1965 Canadian federal election: Quebec West
Party	Candidate	Votes
Liberal	Jean Marchand	10,669
Ralliement créditiste	Lucien Plourde	9,820
Progressive Conservative	Jacques Lavoie	3,454
New Democratic	Jean-Paul Bérubé	1,222
Ouvrier indépendant	Adélard Patry	298

1968 Canadian federal election: Langelier
Party	Candidate	Votes	%
Liberal	Jean Marchand	11,439	39.0
Ralliement créditiste	Guy Jean	8,770	29.9
Progressive Conservative	Rodrigue Pageau	8,150	27.8
New Democratic	Pierre Pourtier	658	2.2
Ralliement créditiste	Michel Roy	308	1.1
Total valid votes		29,325	100.0

1972 Canadian federal election: Langelier
Party	Candidate	Votes	%	±%
Liberal	Jean Marchand	14,725	57.3	+18.3
Social Credit	J. Wilfrid Dufresne	6,101	23.7	-7.2
Progressive Conservative	Albert Lemoine	3,206	12.5	-15.3
Independent	Guy Jean	1,313	5.1	
Independent	Michel Parayre	349	1.4	
Total valid votes		25,694	100.0	
Liberal hold		Swing		+12.8%
(Social Credit vote is compared to Ralliement créditiste vote in the 1968 election.)

1974 Canadian federal election: Langelier
Party	Candidate	Votes	%	±%
Liberal	Jean Marchand	13,557	63.6	+6.3
Social Credit	Sauveur Fradette	3,344	15.7	-8.1
Progressive Conservative	Normand Robidoux	2,530	11.9	-0.6
New Democratic	Clément Gilbert	1,110	5.2	
Independent	Albert Lemoine	337	1.6	
Independent	Micheline Roberge	184	0.9	
Marxist–Leninist	Michel Papayre	161	0.8	-0.6
Independent	Lionel Larocque	97	0.5	
Total valid votes		21,320	100.0	
Liberal hold		Swing		+7.2%
Mr. Papayre's result as a Marxist–Leninist candidate is compared to his result in the 1972 general election as an independent candidate.

=== National Assembly of Quebec, 1976 ===
1976 Quebec general election
Party	Candidate	Votes	%	±%
Parti Québécois	Claude Morin	22,850	58.22	+11.37
Liberal	Jean Marchand	13,307	33.90	-15.11
Union Nationale	Raymond Cantin	2,705	6.89	+4.94
Ralliement créditiste	Jean-Paul Rhéaume	386	0.98	-1.07
Total valid votes		39,248	98.27	
Total rejected ballots		689	1.73	-0.54
Turnout		39,397	90.80	+5.89
Electors on the lists		43,984	–	
Parti Québécois gain from Liberal		Swing		+13.24
