= Lucien Plourde =

Canadian politician

Member of Parliament for Quebec West
- In office June 1962 – September 1965
- Preceded by: J.-Eugène Bissonnette
- Succeeded by: Jean Marchand

Personal details
- Born: 27 March 1930 (age 96) Saint-Augustin de Québec, Quebec, Canada
- Party: Ralliement Créditiste; Social Credit
- Profession: grocer, teacher

Lucien Plourde (born 27 March 1930) was a Ralliement Créditiste and Social Credit party member of the House of Commons of Canada. He was a grocer and teacher by career.

He was first elected at the Quebec West riding in the 1962 general election under the Social Credit party banner and re-elected there in 1963 under the Ralliement créditiste, following Plourde's support of Réal Caouette during the Social Credit party split. Plourde was defeated in the 1965 election by Jean Marchand of the Liberal party.

1962 Canadian federal election: Quebec West
Party	Candidate	Votes
Social Credit	Lucien Plourde	16,169
Liberal	René Bégin	6,306
Progressive Conservative	J.-Eugène Bissonnette	4,575
New Democratic	Gérard Demers	360
Ouvrier indépendant	Adélard Patry	152

1963 Canadian federal election: Quebec West
Party	Candidate	Votes
Social Credit	Lucien Plourde	13,136
Liberal	Jean-Paul Nolin	9,580
Progressive Conservative	Jacques Lavoie	3,160
New Democratic	Albert Simard	848
Independent SC	Magella Julien	373

1965 Canadian federal election: Quebec West
Party	Candidate	Votes
Liberal	Jean Marchand	10,669
Ralliement créditiste	Lucien Plourde	9,820
Progressive Conservative	Jacques Lavoie	3,454
New Democratic	Jean-Paul Bérubé	1,222
Ouvrier indépendant	Adélard Patry	298
