= William Power (Canadian politician) =

Canadian politician

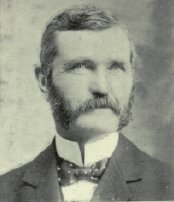

Member of the Canadian Parliament for Quebec West
- In office 1902–1908
- Preceded by: Richard Reid Dobell
- Succeeded by: William Price
- In office 1911–1917
- Preceded by: William Price
- Succeeded by: Georges Parent

Personal details
- Born: 21 February 1849 Sillery, Canada East
- Died: 11 December 1920 (aged 71)
- Party: Liberal
- Relations: Bridgit Fitzgerald, mother Frank Power, Grandson; Lawrence Cannon, Great-grandson
- Children: Francis Xavier Power Charles Gavan Power; William Gerard Power; James Power; Joe Power

William Power (21 February 1849 – 11 December 1920) was a Canadian politician.

Born in the parish of Sillery, Canada East, the son of William Power and Bridgit Fitzgerald, both Irish, Power was educated at the Commercial Academy of Quebec. A lumber merchant, he was elected to the House of Commons of Canada for Quebec West in a 1902 by-election, after the death of the sitting MP, Richard Reid Dobell. A Liberal, he was re-elected in 1904 but was defeated in 1908. He was elected again in 1911 but did not run in 1917.

He married Susan Winifred Rockett. His son, Charles Gavan Power, was an MP and senator. His grandson, Francis Gavan Power was an MP. His great-grandson Lawrence Cannon is a Conservative MP and cabinet minister. His son William Gerard Power was a member of the Legislative Council of Quebec; another son, Joseph Ignatius Power was a member of the Legislative Assembly of Quebec, and also played professional hockey; yet another son, James Power, was also a professional hockey player, and a soldier.

== Electoral record ==
By-election on 29 January 1902 On Dobell's death, 11 January 1902
Party	Candidate	Votes
Liberal	William Power	acclaimed

1904 Canadian federal election: Quebec West
Party	Candidate	Votes
Liberal	William Power	1,053
Conservative	Lawrence Stafford	660

1908 Canadian federal election: Quebec West
Party	Candidate	Votes
Conservative	William Price	1,025
Liberal	William Power	1,015

1911 Canadian federal election: Quebec West
Party	Candidate	Votes
Liberal	William Power	1,219
Conservative	William Price	1,128
