= Charles Parent =

Canadian politician

Member of Parliament for Quebec West and South
- In office October 1935 – June 1949
- Preceded by: riding created
- Succeeded by: riding dissolved

Member of Parliament for Quebec West
- In office June 1949 – August 1953
- Preceded by: riding re-established
- Succeeded by: J.-Wilfrid Dufresne

Personal details
- Born: Charles Eugène Parent; 18 November 1894 Quebec City, Quebec, Canada
- Died: 12 June 1961 (aged 66)
- Party: Liberal; Independent Liberal
- Spouse: Gertrude Bruneau
- Profession: lawyer

Charles Eugène Parent (18 November 1894 – 12 June 1961) was a Liberal party and Independent Liberal member of the House of Commons of Canada. He was born in Quebec City, Quebec and became a lawyer by career.

He was first elected to Parliament at the Quebec West and South riding in the 1935 general election then re-elected there in 1940. From 23 November 1944 until the 1949 election, Parent was not a member of the Liberal party but instead sat as an Independent Liberal. Parent and several other Quebec Liberal MPs had broken with their party as a result of the Conscription Crisis of 1944, quitting the Liberal caucus in order to oppose the government's decision to deploy National Resources Mobilization Act conscripts overseas. Previously, conscripts had only been used for "home defence" and kept within Canada. He ran and was re-elected as an "Independent Liberal" in the 1945 federal election.

When the Quebec West and South riding was dissolved, Parent became the candidate at the expanded Quebec West riding which he won as an official Liberal candidate in the 1949 election. Parent lost to J.-Wilfrid Dufresne of the Progressive Conservative party in the 1953 election.

His father, Simon-Napoléon Parent, was a Premier of Quebec and a mayor of Quebec City. Charles Parent's brother, Georges Parent, was a Senator and also a member of the House of Commons.

== Electoral record ==
1949 Canadian federal election: Quebec West
| Party | Candidate | Votes |
|---|---|---|
| Liberal | Charles Parent | 12,391 |
| Progressive Conservative | Joseph-Edmond Paquet | 6,946 |
| Union des électeurs | Henri Borgia | 1,714 |
| Independent | Albert Cantin | 1,344 |
| Independent PC | Joseph-Adjutor Marquis | 276 |
| Co-operative Commonwealth | Albert-S. Moreau | 180 |

1953 Canadian federal election: Quebec West
| Party | Candidate | Votes |
|---|---|---|
| Progressive Conservative | J.-Wilfrid Dufresne | 8,464 |
| Independent Liberal | René Bégin | 6,034 |
| Liberal | Charles Parent | 4,612 |
| Independent Liberal | François Fournier | 3,910 |
