= Cannon family (Canada) =

Canadian political family

The extended Cannon family has had strong regional and national political influence in Canada. The family originated in Ireland and moved to Quebec in the 18th century. Members of the family have served in positions as lawyers, judges, Supreme Court judges, senators, ministers of defence, solicitors general, and Members of Parliament.

== Notable members ==
- Lawrence John Cannon (1852 – 1921), lawyer and judge.
- Lawrence Arthur Dumoulin Cannon (1877 – 1939), long-time Liberal politician and Supreme Court judge
- Lucien Cannon (1887 – 1950), Liberal MP and Solicitor General of Canada.
- Charles-Arthur Dumoulin Cannon (1905 – 1976), Liberal MP
- Lawrence Cannon (1947-), is a Canadian politician from Quebec and Prime Minister Stephen Harper's Quebec lieutenant.
