= David Lewis Macpherson =

Canadian politician (1818–1896)

The Honourable Sir David Lewis Macpherson PC KCMG
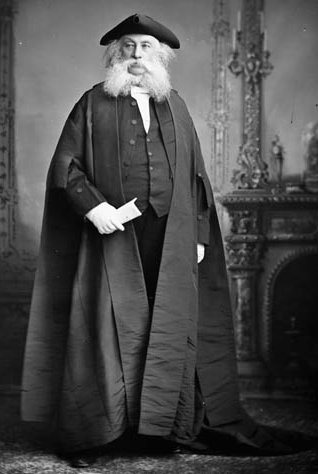

Canadian Senator from Ontario
- In office October 23, 1867 – August 16, 1896
- Appointed by: Royal Proclamation

Personal details
- Born: September 12, 1818 Castle Leathers in Inverness parish, Scotland
- Died: August 16, 1896 (aged 77) at sea en route to Canada
- Party: Conservative
- Cabinet: Minister Without Portfolio (1880–1883); Minister of the Interior (1883–1885)
- Portfolio: Speaker of the Senate (February 1880 & April 1880 – October 1883)
- Military Service
- Allegiance: Lower Canada
- Branch: Canadian Militia
- Service years: 1838
- Rank: Private
- Unit: Montreal Light Infantry
- Conflicts: Lower Canada Rebellion

Sir David Lewis Macpherson, PC KCMG (September 12, 1818 – August 16, 1896) was a Canadian businessman and political figure. He was a member of the Senate of Canada from 1867 to 1896. He was knighted for his service to the country in 1884.

== Life and career ==
Macpherson was born in Castle Leathers in Inverness parish, Scotland, in 1818 and came to Lower Canada with his family in 1835. He became a clerk in the Montreal office of his older brother's shipping business, which transported passengers and freight in Upper and Lower Canada. During the Lower Canada Rebellion, from November 4 until December 31, 1838, Macpherson served as a private in the Montreal Light Infantry.

In 1842, he became a senior partner in the business. In partnership with Alexander Tilloch Galt and Luther Hamilton Holton, Macpherson acquired the shares of the Montreal and Kingston Railway, knowing that their rail line was required as part of a planned railway connection between Montreal and Hamilton. He was part of a contracting firm formed to extend the Grand Trunk Railway in Upper Canada. In 1853, he moved to Toronto. He helped set up the Toronto Rolling Mills Company, which supplied track to the Grand Trunk. He also served as a director of the Bank of Upper Canada. In 1864, he was elected to the Legislative Council of the Province of Canada for Saugeen division and, in 1867, he was appointed to the Senate as a Conservative and served until his death.

Macpherson was a member of the arbitration board that dealt with the financial issues associated with the creation of the separate provinces of Ontario and Quebec after Confederation. He led the resistance in the Senate to John Rose's proposed changes to banking legislation, and some of Macpherson's proposals made their way into the Bank Act of 1871.

He served as Speaker of the Senate from 1880 to 1883. In the early eighties, the legalization of marriage with a deceased wife's sister was under discussion in the Parliament of Canada. On the day that the bill received its second reading in the Red Chamber, Macpherson invited Mrs. Susan Anna Wiggins, whose 'The Gunhilda Letters: Marriage with a Deceased Wife's Sister' letters of support for the bill had gained attention, to take a seat on his right, an honour which was never before accorded to any woman but the wife of a Governor-General.

To commemorate his time as Speaker, Macpherson, as well as other Speakers of the Senate, had his name crafted in stained glass in the ceiling of the front foyer of the Senate Chamber.

Macpherson also served in cabinet as a Minister without Portfolio from 1880 to 1883 and as Minister of the Interior from October 1883 to 1885. In later life, Macpherson suffered from diabetes and he spent part of the summer and fall each year recovering at spas in Germany. He attempted to encourage settlement in western Canada along the planned route for the Canadian Pacific Railway, but settlers found land in the western United States more attractive. Problems with land policy, unwillingness to take action and a basic lack of understanding in Macpherson's ministry of the concerns of the Métis people helped set the stage for the North-West Rebellion in 1885. He resigned from his cabinet post later that year.

He died at sea on August 16, 1896, on board the steamship Labrador, in mid-ocean, and his remains were buried at sea.

== Family ==
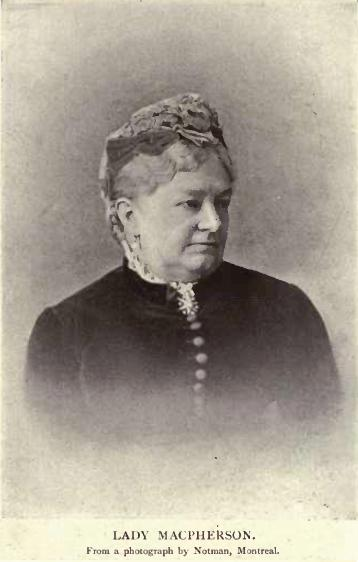
Lady Macpherson by William Notman

David Lewis Macpherson married on June 18, 1844, Elizabeth Sarah Molson, daughter of William Molson, President of Molson Bank, and his wife, Elizabeth Badgley, and granddaughter of the Hon. John Molson, member of the Executive and Legislative Councils of Lower Canada, and President of the Bank of Montreal. Elizabeth was born and educated in Montreal.

The couple lived for forty years at their mansion, Chestnut Park, Toronto, Ontario. Lady Macpherson volunteered with the Toronto Ladies' Educational Association. Lady Macpherson died, after a long illness, at San Remo, Italy, March 23, 1894, aged 74. Her remains were cremated, and the ashes were deposited in Mount Pleasant Cemetery, Toronto. The Honourable William Miller, K.C., pronounced in the Senate a tribute to Sir David and Lady Macpherson after the former's death.

The couple had two sons and five daughters. Elizabeth Frances Dobell was the wife of the Hon. Richard Reid Dobell, M.P., P.C., Quebec. Naomi Beckett was the wife of Thomas Beckett. Helen Bankes was the wife of Major Meyrick Bankes, Highland Light Infantry, London. Christina Ridout was the wife of P. F. Ridout, Esquire, Toronto. Isabel Louise Kirkpatrick was the wife of Sir George Airey Kirkpatrick, P.C., K.C.M.G., formerly Lieutenant-Governor of Ontario, Toronto.

== Archives ==
There is a David Lewis Macpherson fonds at Library and Archives Canada.
