= Georges Parent =

Canadian politician (1879-1942)

The Honourable Georges Parent KC
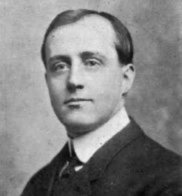

Member of the Canadian Parliament for Montmorency
- In office 1904–1911
- Preceded by: Thomas Chase-Casgrain
- Succeeded by: Rodolphe Forget

Member of the Canadian Parliament for Quebec West
- In office 1917–1930
- Preceded by: William Power
- Succeeded by: Maurice Dupré

Senator for Kennebec, Quebec
- In office 1930–1942
- Appointed by: William Lyon Mackenzie King
- Preceded by: Louis Lavergne
- Succeeded by: Cyrille Vaillancourt

Speaker of the Senate
- In office 9 May 1940 – 14 December 1942
- Preceded by: Walter Edward Foster
- Succeeded by: Thomas Vien

Personal details
- Born: 15 December 1879 Quebec City, Quebec, Canada
- Died: 14 December 1942 (aged 62)
- Party: Liberal
- Relations: Simon-Napoléon Parent, father Charles Parent, brother

Georges Parent (15 December 1879 – 14 December 1942) was a Canadian lawyer, politician and Speaker of the Senate of Canada from 1940 until 1942.

Parent was born in Quebec City, the son of Simon-Napoléon Parent who served as Premier of Quebec from 1900 to 1905 and Mayor of Quebec City from 1894 until 1905.

He studied law at Université Laval and was admitted to the Bar of Quebec in 1904 and joined the law firm of Fitzpatrick, Parent, Taschereau, Roy and Cannon in Quebec City.

That same year, at the age of 25, Parent was first elected to the House of Commons of Canada in the 1904 federal election as the Liberal Member of Parliament for Montmorency, Quebec. As the youngest Member of Parliament and was asked by Prime Minister Wilfrid Laurier to second the motion on the Speech from the Throne. He was re-elected in 1908 but defeated in the 1911.

Out of office, Parent returned to his legal practice and pursued various business interests. He ultimately became president of Citadel Brick Ltd., Equitable Enterprises and of Wolfesfield Ltd., vice-president of Donnacona Paper Company and was a director of several other firms including the publisher of Le Soleil newspaper.

Parent returned to Parliament in the 1917 federal election as a Laurier-Liberal representing Quebec West. He remained an MP until 3 June 1930, when he was appointed to the Senate of Canada by Prime Minister William Lyon Mackenzie King prior to the 1930 federal election.

In 1940, King named him Speaker of the Senate on 9 May 1940. Parent died in office on 14 December 1942.

== Electoral record ==
1904 Canadian federal election: Montmorency
Party	Candidate	Votes
Liberal	Georges Parent	1,292
Conservative	Thomas Chase-Casgrain	1,035

1908 Canadian federal election: Montmorency
Party	Candidate	Votes
Liberal	Georges Parent	1,388
Conservative	Antoine Gobeil	1,073

1911 Canadian federal election: Montmorency
Party	Candidate	Votes
Conservative	Rodolphe Forget	1,359
Liberal	Georges Parent	1,292

1917 Canadian federal election: Quebec West
Party	Candidate	Votes
Opposition (Laurier Liberals)	Georges Parent	6,392
Government (Unionist)	Henri Chassé	460

1921 Canadian federal election: Quebec West
Party	Candidate	Votes
Liberal	Georges Parent	8,741
Conservative	Pierre Bertrand	4,715

1925 Canadian federal election: Quebec West
Party	Candidate	Votes
Liberal	Georges Parent	7,561
Conservative	Charles Ratté	6,059

1926 Canadian federal election: Quebec West
Party	Candidate	Votes
Liberal	Georges Parent	7,501
Conservative	Camilien Joseph Lockwell	6,495
