= Maurice Dupré =

Canadian politician

The Honourable Maurice Dupré PC
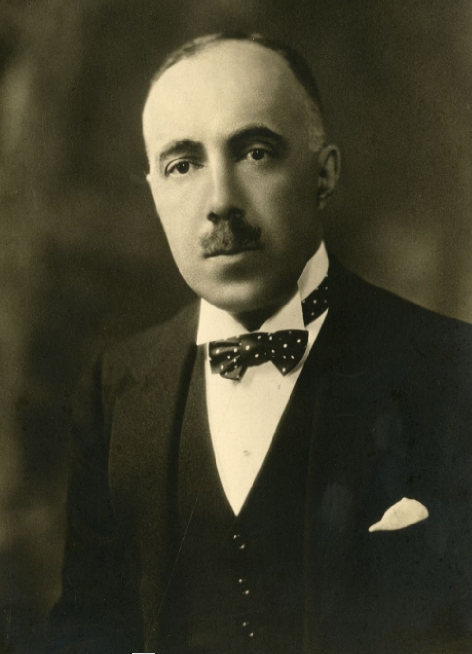

Member of the Canadian Parliament for Quebec West
- In office 1930–1935
- Preceded by: Georges Parent
- Succeeded by: The electoral district was abolished in 1933.

Personal details
- Born: March 20, 1888 Lévis, Quebec, Canada
- Died: October 3, 1941 (aged 53)
- Party: Conservative
- Cabinet: Solicitor General of Canada (1930–1935)

Maurice Dupré, PC (March 20, 1888 – October 3, 1941) was a Canadian politician.

Born in Lévis, Quebec, he first ran unsuccessfully for the House of Commons of Canada representing the Quebec riding of Kamouraska in the 1925 federal election. A Conservative, he was elected in the 1930 federal election representing the riding of Quebec West. He was defeated in 1935 and again in 1940. From 1930 to 1935, he was the Solicitor General of Canada.

1930 Canadian federal election: Quebec West
Party	Candidate	Votes
Conservative	Maurice Dupré	10,215
Liberal	Gérard Lacroix	9,769

Canadian federal by-election, 25 August 1930
Party	Candidate	Votes
On Dupré's acceptance of an office of emolument under the Crown, 7 August 1930
Conservative	Maurice Dupré	acclaimed
