= John Gabriel Hearn =

Canadian politician

- Born: March 26, 1863; Quebec City, Canada East
- Died: January 28, 1927 (aged 63)
- Education: Royal Arsenal
- Occupation: businessman
- Spouse: Katherine M. Ryan (m. 1890)
- Parents: John Hearn (father); Mary Doran (mother)

John Gabriel Hearn (March 26, 1863 – January 28, 1927) was a businessman and political figure in Quebec. He represented Québec-Ouest in the Legislative Assembly of Quebec from 1900 to 1904 as a Liberal member.

He was born in Quebec City, Canada East, the son of John Hearn and Mary Doran, and was educated at the Quebec commercial academy. He studied at the Royal Military College in Kingston from 9 September 1880 until 1884, cadet number 106.

He also studied at the Royal Arsenal at Woolwich. Hearn became a real estate agent and also administered the property accumulated by his father. In 1890, he married Katherine M. Ryan. He served on the Quebec municipal council and was president of the finance committee from 1896 to 1898. He died in Quebec City at the age of 63.
