= Arthur H. Murphy =

Canadian politician (1831–1903)

Arthur H. Murphy (August 24, 1831 – October 27, 1903) was an entrepreneur and political figure in Quebec. He represented Québec-Ouest in the Legislative Assembly of Quebec from 1878 to 1881 as a Liberal.

He was born in Notre-Dame de Québec, Lower Canada, the son of Daniel Murphy and Ellen Murphy, and was educated there. Murphy was involved in shipping on the Great Lakes and owned a lumber business at Quebec City and phosphate and asbestos mines at Thetford Mines, Templeton and Black Lake. He was also a commissioner for the Turnpike Trust. Murphy married Marie Roach. He served on the municipal council for Quebec City. He ran unsuccessfully for a seat in the Quebec assembly in an 1877 by-election before being elected in 1878. Murphy died at Montreal at the age of 72.
