= William Gerard Power =

Canadian politician

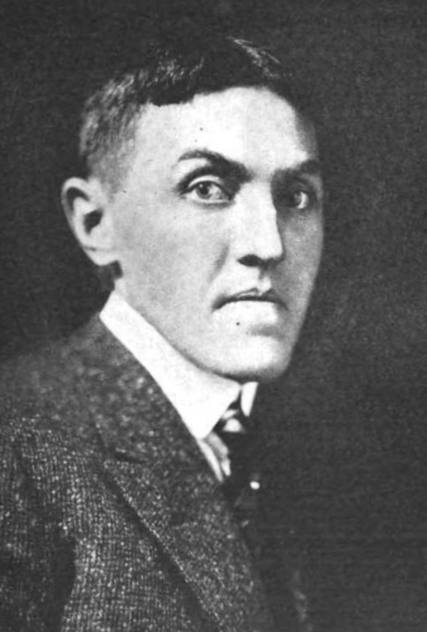

Member of the Legislative Council of Quebec for Stadacona
- In office 1923–1934
- Preceded by: John Charles Kaine
- Succeeded by: Hector Laferté

Personal details
- Born: April 19, 1882 Sillery, Quebec, Canada
- Died: July 8, 1940 (aged 58) Quebec City, Quebec, Canada
- Party: Liberal
- Relations: William Power, father Charles Gavan Power, brother Joseph Ignatius Power, brother Lawrence Cannon, great-nephew

William Gerard Power (April 19, 1882 – July 8, 1940) was a Canadian politician.

Born in the parish of Sillery, Quebec, the son of William Power and Susan Winifred Rockett, Power was educated at the Commercial Academy of Quebec and the College Mont-Saint-Louis in Montreal . A lumber merchant, he joined W & J Sharples in 1897, becoming its president in 1921, until 1929. A partner in the River Ouelle Pulp & Lumber Company. Named to the Legislative Council of Quebec in 1923 for the division of Stadacona as a Liberal. He resigned on July 25, 1934, to become a member of the Quebec Liquor Commission.

His brother, Charles Gavan Power, was an MP and senator; another brother, Joe Power, was a professional ice hockey player and member of the Legislative Assembly of Quebec; yet another brother, James Power, was a professional ice hockey player. His great-nephew Lawrence Cannon was a Conservative MP and cabinet minister. His son Col. Douglas Haig Power was a member of the Canadian Forces and led the evacuation of Canadian UNEF forces from Gaza in 1967.
