= Quebec South =

Former federal electoral district in Quebec, Canada

Coordinates: 46.8020°N 71.2322°W

Quebec electoral district

Defunct federal electoral district
- Legislature: House of Commons
- District created: 1914
- District abolished: 1967
- First contested: 1917
- Last contested: 1965

Quebec South was a federal electoral district in Quebec, Canada, that was represented in the House of Commons of Canada from 1917 to 1968.

This riding was created in 1914 from parts of Quebec West and Quebec-Centre ridings. It was abolished in 1966 when it was redistributed into Langelier and Louis-Hébert ridings.

== Members of Parliament ==
This riding elected the following members of Parliament:

Parliament	Years	Member	Party
Quebec South; Riding created from Quebec West and Quebec-Centre
13th	1917–1921	Charles Gavan Power	Opposition (Laurier Liberals)
14th	1921–1925	Charles Gavan Power	Liberal
15th	1925–1926	Charles Gavan Power	Liberal
16th	1926–1930	Charles Gavan Power	Liberal
17th	1930–1935	Charles Gavan Power	Liberal
18th	1935–1940	Charles Gavan Power	Liberal
19th	1940–1945	Charles Gavan Power	Liberal
20th	1945–1949	Charles Gavan Power	Liberal
21st	1949–1953	Charles Gavan Power	Liberal
22nd	1953–1955	Charles Gavan Power	Liberal
22nd	1955–1957	Frank Power	Liberal
23rd	1957–1958	Frank Power	Liberal
24th	1958–1962	Jacques Flynn	Progressive Conservative
25th	1962–1963	Jean-Charles Cantin	Liberal
26th	1963–1965	Jean-Charles Cantin	Liberal
27th	1965–1968	Jean-Charles Cantin	Liberal
Riding dissolved into Langelier and Louis-Hébert

== Election results ==
1917 Canadian federal election
Party	Candidate	Votes
Opposition (Laurier Liberals)	Charles Gavan Power	3,816
Government (Unionist)	James Archibald Scott	2,501

1921 Canadian federal election
Party	Candidate	Votes
Liberal	Charles Gavan Power	6,645
Conservative	Thomas James Delany	3,281
Independent	Eugène Fortunat Dussault	669

1925 Canadian federal election
Party	Candidate	Votes
Liberal	Charles Gavan Power	6,780
Conservative	John Skillman O'Meara	5,109

1926 Canadian federal election
Party	Candidate	Votes
Liberal	Charles Gavan Power	6,527
Conservative	John Skillman O'Meara	4,901
Independent Conservative	Adolphe Chevalier	775

1930 Canadian federal election
Party	Candidate	Votes
Liberal	Charles Gavan Power	8,086
Conservative	Francis J. Dinan	6,633

1935 Canadian federal election
Party	Candidate	Votes
Liberal	Charles Gavan Power	11,270
Conservative	John Gordon Ross	6,663

1940 Canadian federal election
Party	Candidate	Votes
Liberal	Charles Gavan Power	15,196
National Government	Francis James Dinan	4,284

1945 Canadian federal election
Party	Candidate	Votes
Liberal	Charles Gavan Power	14,091
Independent	Charles-Arthur Plante	3,457
Independent	Louis Tardivel	1,486
Social Credit	Joseph-Eugène Laliberté	931

1949 Canadian federal election
Party	Candidate	Votes
Liberal	Charles Gavan Power	19,383
Progressive Conservative	Antoine-René Gobeil	6,454
Union des électeurs	Joseph Bouchard	542

1953 Canadian federal election
Party	Candidate	Votes
Liberal	Charles Gavan Power	18,950
Progressive Conservative	Félix Hudon	6,363

By-election on 26 September 1955 On Power being called to the Senate, 28 July 1955
Party	Candidate	Votes
Liberal	Francis Gavan Power	13,881
Progressive Conservative	Yvon-R. Tassé	10,677
Independent	Jean-Louis Plante	231

1957 Canadian federal election
Party	Candidate	Votes
Liberal	Francis Gavan Power	17,709
Progressive Conservative	Jacques Flynn	9,659
Independent Liberal	Paul Latouche	1,092
Independent	René Brulotte	160

1958 Canadian federal election
Party	Candidate	Votes
Progressive Conservative	Jacques Flynn	15,771
Liberal	Francis Gavan Power	15,507

1962 Canadian federal election
Party	Candidate	Votes
Liberal	Jean-Charles Cantin	12,521
Progressive Conservative	Jacques Flynn	9,216
Social Credit	Louis Leclerc	5,586
New Democratic	J.-P. Gagnon	1,296

1963 Canadian federal election
Party	Candidate	Votes
Liberal	Jean-Charles Cantin	16,314
Progressive Conservative	Jacques Marquis	5,533
Social Credit	Louis Fréchette	5,454
New Democratic	Jean-Paul Gagnon	2,329

1965 Canadian federal election
Party	Candidate	Votes
Liberal	Jean-Charles Cantin	16,141
Progressive Conservative	Guy Dorion	5,373
New Democratic	Yves Faguy	2,506
Ralliement créditiste	Gérard Ricard	2,290

== See also ==
- List of Canadian electoral districts
- Historical federal electoral districts of Canada
