= William Price (Canadian politician) =

Canadian politician

Sir William Price
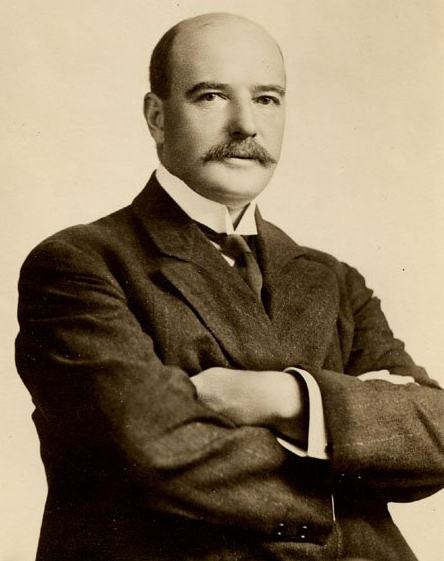

Member of the Canadian Parliament for Quebec West
- In office 1908–1911
- Preceded by: William Power
- Succeeded by: William Power

Personal details
- Born: August 30, 1867 Talca, Chile
- Died: November 2, 1924 (aged 57) Kénogami (Jonquière), Quebec
- Party: Conservative

Sir William Price (August 30, 1867 – October 2, 1924) was a Canadian businessman and politician.

Born in Talca, Chile, the son of Henry Ferrier Price and Florence Rogerson, Price was educated at Bishops College School in Lennoxville, Quebec and later at St. Marks School, Windsor, England. He was elected to the House of Commons of Canada for the electoral district of Quebec West in a 1908 by-election. A Conservative, he was defeated in the 1911 election.

He raised two companies for service during the Boer War. He was one of the organizers of the Valcartier Military Camp (now CFB Valcartier). It was for this work that he was knighted. During World War I, he served as a Lieutenant-Colonel of the 171st Battalion.

1908 Canadian federal election: Quebec West
Party	Candidate	Votes
Conservative	William Price	1,025
Liberal	William Power	1,015

1911 Canadian federal election: Quebec West
Party	Candidate	Votes
Liberal	William Power	1,219
Conservative	William Price	1,128

== See also ==
- List of Bishop's College School alumni
