= John O'Farrell (politician) =

Canadian lawyer and politician

John O'Farrell (December 4, 1826 – November 11, 1892) was a lawyer and political figure in Canada East. He represented Lotbinière in the Legislative Assembly of the Province of Canada from 1854 to 1858. His surname also appears as Farrall.

He was born in Quebec City, the son of Patrick Farrall and Margaret McKenzie. O'Farrell articled in law, was called to the bar in 1850 and set up practice in Quebec City. In 1853, he married Maria Louisa Nowlan. He was expelled from the assembly in May 1858 and his election was overturned; he did not run for reelection in the by-election held later that year. O'Farrell ran unsuccessfully for a seat in the House of Commons in 1872 and 1874. He died in Quebec City at the age of 65.
