= Charles Gavan Power =

Canadian politician

The Honourable Charles Gavan Power PC MC
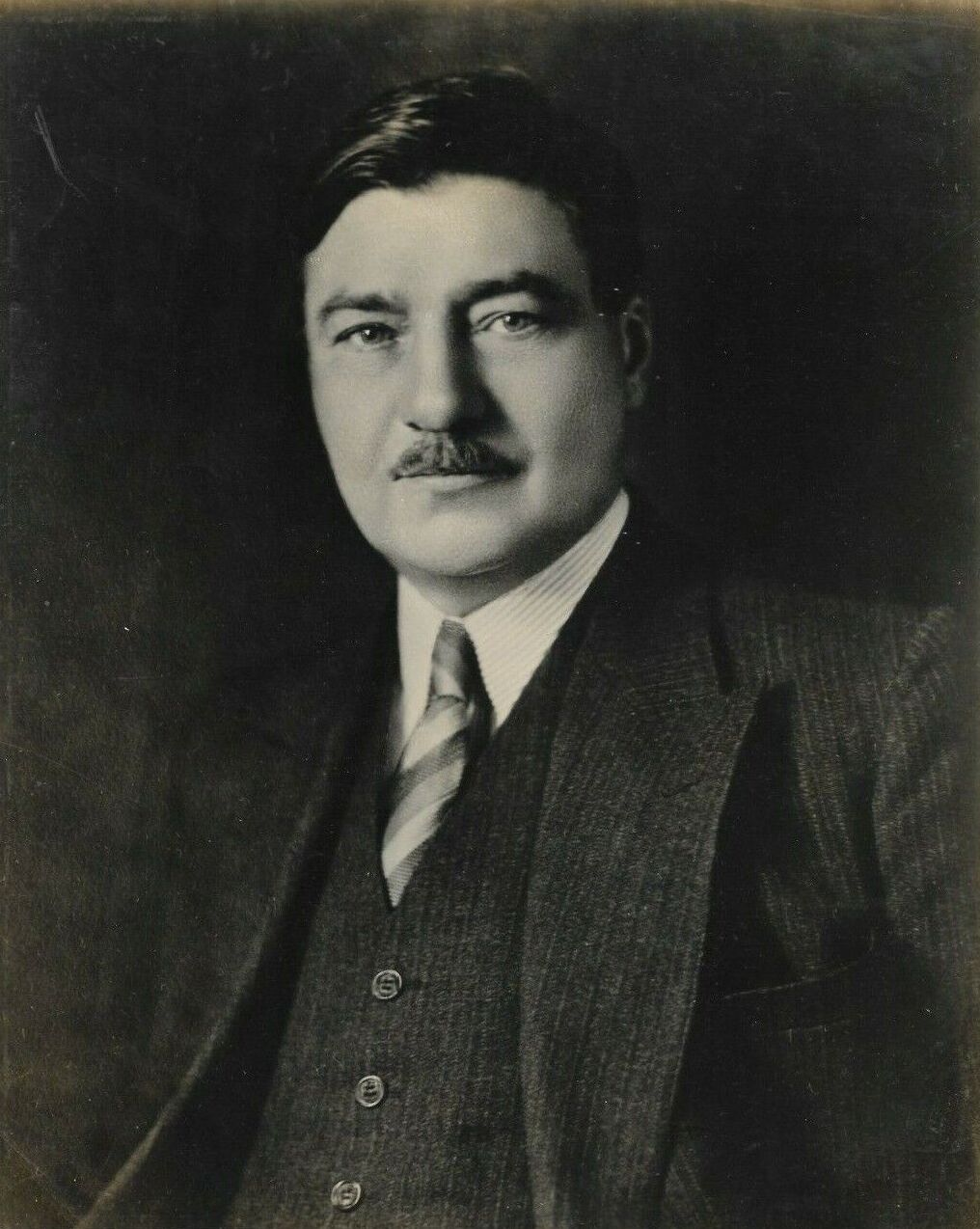

Minister of National Defence for Air
- In office 23 May 1940 – 26 November 1944
- Prime Minister: W. L. Mackenzie King
- Preceded by: Office created
- Succeeded by: Angus Lewis Macdonald

Acting Minister of National Defence
- In office 23 May 1940 – 26 November 1944
- Prime Minister: W. L. Mackenzie King
- Preceded by: Office created
- Succeeded by: Vacant

Postmaster General
- In office 19 September 1939 – 22 May 1940
- Prime Minister: W. L. Mackenzie King
- Preceded by: Norman Alexander McLarty
- Succeeded by: James Lorimer Ilsley (Acting)

Minister of National Defence
- Acting; 11 June 1940 – 4 July 1940
- Prime Minister: W. L. Mackenzie King
- Preceded by: Norman McLeod Rogers
- Succeeded by: James Ralston

Minister of Pensions and National Health
- In office 23 October 1935 – 18 September 1939
- Prime Minister: W. L. Mackenzie King
- Preceded by: Donald Matheson Sutherland
- Succeeded by: Ian Alistair Mackenzie

Senator for Gulf
- In office 28 July 1955 – 30 May 1968
- Appointed by: Louis St. Laurent
- Preceded by: Joseph Arthur Lesage
- Succeeded by: Paul Lafond

Member of Parliament for Quebec South
- In office 17 December 1917 – 27 July 1955
- Preceded by: Riding created
- Succeeded by: Francis Gavan Power

Personal details
- Born: 18 January 1888 Sillery, Quebec, Canada
- Died: 30 May 1968 (aged 80) Quebec City, Quebec, Canada
- Resting place: Saint Patrick's Cemetery, Sillery, Quebec, Canada
- Party: Liberal
- Spouse: Rosemary Pendleton (m. 1912)
- Relations: William Power (father); William Gerard Power (brother); James Power (brother); Joe Power (brother); Lawrence Cannon (grandson)
- Children: 3, including Frank
- Education: Université Laval
- Occupation: Lawyer

Military service
- Allegiance: Canada
- Branch/service: Canadian Expeditionary Force
- Years of service: 1915-1918
- Rank: Acting Major
- Battles/wars: Battle of the Somme
- Awards: Military Cross

Charles Gavan "Chubby" Power MC PC (18 January 1888 – 30 May 1968) was a Canadian politician and ice hockey player. Many members of his family, including his father, two brothers, a son and a grandson, all had political careers; two of his brothers also played ice hockey.

== Early life ==
Born in Sillery, Power played ice hockey while studying law. From 1906, he played for the Quebec Bulldogs of the Eastern Canada Amateur Hockey Association (ECAHA). A proficient scorer, he scored four goals in one game in 1908 and five goals in a game in 1909.

== Military service ==
Power served overseas in World War I, first as a private in the Westmount Battalion then to 3rd Battalion (Toronto Regiment), CEF as captain and then as an acting major with the 14th Battalion (Royal Montreal Regiment), CEF. He was wounded during the Battle of the Somme. He was awarded the Military Cross for gallantry during military operations.

== Political career ==
He entered politics in the 1917 federal election in which he was elected as a "Laurier Liberal" during the Conscription Crisis of 1917.

In 1935, Power was appointed minister of pensions and health in the Liberal cabinet of Prime Minister William Lyon Mackenzie King.

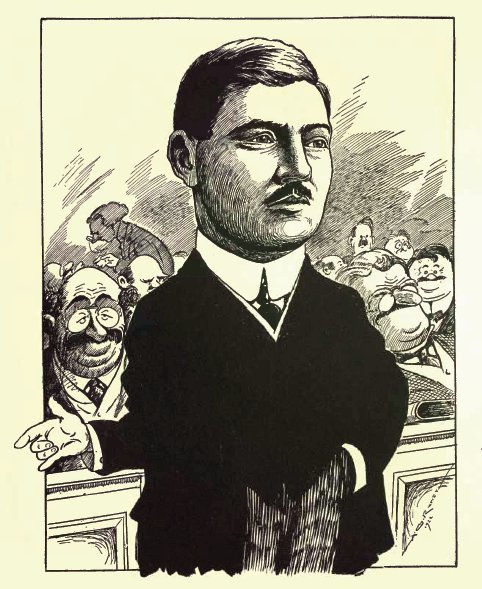
Charles Gavan Power from Canadian men of affairs in cartoon (1922)

During World War II, he served as Acting Minister of National Defence (1940) and Minister of National Defence for Air (1940 to 1945) and was responsible for expanding the Royal Canadian Air Force. His opposition to conscription led him to resign from the cabinet during the Conscription Crisis of 1944, after the government passed an Order in Council to send conscripts overseas. Power sat as an "Independent Liberal" for the duration of the war and was re-elected as an Independent Liberal in the 1945 federal election. He then rejoined the party and ran to succeed King in the 1948 Liberal leadership convention but came a poor third.

Charles Power retired from the House of Commons in 1955. He was appointed to the Senate on 28 July 1955 and served until his death in 1968.

== Family ==
His father, William Power, was also a Member of Parliament from Quebec, retiring in 1917. His brother James was also an ice hockey player. Another brother, Joe, was also an ice hockey player, as well as a Liberal member of the Legislative Assembly of Quebec. Still another brother, William, became a Liberal member of the Legislative Council of Quebec. His son Frank Power also became a Liberal Member of Parliament, as did his grandson Lawrence Cannon, who also became a Conservative cabinet minister and later as Canadian Ambassador to France.

Parliament of Canada
Preceded by None - new position	Minister of National Defence for Air; 1940-1945	Succeeded by Angus Lewis Macdonald
