= Quebec West =

Former federal electoral district in Quebec, Canada

Quebec electoral district

Defunct federal electoral district
- Legislature: House of Commons
- District created: 1947
- District abolished: 1967
- First contested: 1949
- Last contested: 1965

Quebec West (French: Québec-Ouest) was a federal electoral district in Quebec, Canada, that was represented in the House of Commons of Canada from 1867 to 1935, and from 1949 to 1968.

It was created by the British North America Act, 1867. It was abolished in 1933 when it was redistributed into Portneuf, Quebec West and South and Québec—Montmorency ridings.

The riding was recreated in 1947 from parts of Quebec West and South riding.

It was abolished in 1966 when it was redistributed into Langelier, Louis-Hébert and Portneuf ridings.

== Members of Parliament ==
This riding elected the following members of Parliament:

Parliament	Years	Member	Party
Quebec West
1st	1867–1872	Thomas McGreevy	Liberal–Conservative
2nd	1872–1874	Thomas McGreevy	Liberal–Conservative
3rd	1874–1878	Thomas McGreevy	Liberal–Conservative
4th	1878–1882	Thomas McGreevy	Liberal–Conservative
5th	1882–1887	Thomas McGreevy	Liberal–Conservative
6th	1887–1891	Thomas McGreevy	Liberal–Conservative
7th	1891–1891	Thomas McGreevy	Liberal–Conservative
7th	1892–1894	John Hearn	Conservative
7th	1895–1896	Thomas McGreevy	Liberal–Conservative
8th	1896–1900	Richard Reid Dobell	Liberal
9th	1900–1902	Richard Reid Dobell	Liberal
9th	1902–1904	William Power	Liberal
10th	1904–1908	William Power	Liberal
11th	1908–1911	William Price	Conservative
12th	1911–1917	William Power	Liberal
13th	1917–1921	Georges Parent	Opposition (Laurier Liberals)
14th	1921–1925	Georges Parent	Liberal
15th	1925–1926	Georges Parent	Liberal
16th	1926–1930	Georges Parent	Liberal
17th	1930–1930	Maurice Dupré	Conservative
17th	1930–1935	Maurice Dupré	Conservative
Riding dissolved into Portneuf, Quebec West and South and Québec—Montmorency
Riding re-created from Quebec West and South
21st	1949–1953	Charles Parent	Liberal
22nd	1953–1957	J.-Wilfrid Dufresne	Progressive Conservative
23rd	1957–1958	René Bégin	Liberal
24th	1958–1962	J.-Eugène Bissonnette	Progressive Conservative
25th	1962–1963	Lucien Plourde	Social Credit
26th	1963–1963	Lucien Plourde	Social Credit
26th	1963–1965	Lucien Plourde	Ralliement créditiste
27th	1965–1968	Jean Marchand	Liberal
Riding dissolved into Langelier, Louis-Hébert and Portneuf

== Election results ==
=== Quebec West, 1867–1935 ===
1867 Canadian federal election
Party	Candidate	Votes
Liberal–Conservative	Thomas McGreevy	acclaimed
Source: Canadian Elections Database

1872 Canadian federal election
Party	Candidate	Votes
Liberal–Conservative	Thomas McGreevy	742
Unknown	John O'Farrell	435

1874 Canadian federal election
Party	Candidate	Votes
Liberal–Conservative	Thomas McGreevy	587
Unknown	John O'Farrell	403

1878 Canadian federal election
Party	Candidate	Votes
Liberal–Conservative	Thomas McGreevy	acclaimed

1882 Canadian federal election
Party	Candidate	Votes
Liberal–Conservative	Thomas McGreevy	612
Unknown	Humphrey	444

1887 Canadian federal election
Party	Candidate	Votes
Liberal–Conservative	Thomas McGreevy	816
Unknown	M.A. Hearn	770

1891 Canadian federal election
Party	Candidate	Votes
Liberal–Conservative	Thomas McGreevy	885
Unknown	M.A. Hearn	832

By-election on 26 February 1892 McGreevy was expelled from the House of Commons, 29 September 1891
Party	Candidate	Votes
Conservative	John Hearn	acclaimed

By-election on 17 April 1895 On Hearn's death, 17 May 1894
Party	Candidate	Votes
Liberal–Conservative	Thomas McGreevy	acclaimed

1896 Canadian federal election
Party	Candidate	Votes
Liberal	Richard Reid Dobell	1,057
Liberal–Conservative	Thomas McGreevy	826

1900 Canadian federal election
Party	Candidate	Votes
Liberal	Richard Reid Dobell	1,018
Conservative	Patrick Kirwin	649

By-election on 29 January 1902 On Dobell's death, 11 January 1902
Party	Candidate	Votes
Liberal	William Power	acclaimed

1904 Canadian federal election
Party	Candidate	Votes
Liberal	William Power	1,053
Conservative	Lawrence Stafford	660

1908 Canadian federal election
Party	Candidate	Votes
Conservative	William Price	1,025
Liberal	William Power	1,015

1911 Canadian federal election
Party	Candidate	Votes
Liberal	William Power	1,219
Conservative	William Price	1,128

1917 Canadian federal election
Party	Candidate	Votes
Opposition (Laurier Liberals)	Georges Parent	6,392
Government (Unionist)	Henri Chassé	460

1921 Canadian federal election
Party	Candidate	Votes
Liberal	Georges Parent	8,741
Conservative	Pierre Bertrand	4,715

1925 Canadian federal election
Party	Candidate	Votes
Liberal	Georges Parent	7,561
Conservative	Charles Ratté	6,059

1926 Canadian federal election
Party	Candidate	Votes
Liberal	Georges Parent	7,501
Conservative	Camilien Joseph Lockwell	6,495

1930 Canadian federal election
Party	Candidate	Votes
Conservative	Maurice Dupré	10,215
Liberal	Gérard Lacroix	9,769

Canadian federal by-election, 25 August 1930
Party	Candidate	Votes
On Dupré's acceptance of an office of emolument under the Crown, 7 August 1930
Conservative	Maurice Dupré	acclaimed

=== Quebec West, 1949–1968 ===
1949 Canadian federal election
Party	Candidate	Votes
Liberal	Charles Parent	12,391
Progressive Conservative	Joseph-Edmond Paquet	6,946
Union des électeurs	Henri Borgia	1,714
Independent	Albert Cantin	1,344
Independent PC	Joseph-Adjutor Marquis	276
Co-operative Commonwealth	Albert-S. Moreau	180

1953 Canadian federal election
Party	Candidate	Votes
Progressive Conservative	J.-Wilfrid Dufresne	8,464
Independent Liberal	René Bégin	6,034
Liberal	Charles Parent	4,612
Independent Liberal	François Fournier	3,910

1957 Canadian federal election
Party	Candidate	Votes
Liberal	René Bégin	11,828
Progressive Conservative	J.-Wilfrid Dufresne	10,981
Independent Liberal	Marcel Turgeon	1,520
Social Credit	Jules Thérien	529

1958 Canadian federal election
Party	Candidate	Votes
Progressive Conservative	J.-Eugène Bissonnette	14,223
Liberal	René Bégin	12,357
Social Credit	Jules Thérien	1,054

1962 Canadian federal election
Party	Candidate	Votes
Social Credit	Lucien Plourde	16,169
Liberal	René Bégin	6,306
Progressive Conservative	J.-Eugène Bissonnette	4,575
New Democratic	Gérard Demers	360
Ouvrier indépendant	Adélard Patry	152

1963 Canadian federal election
Party	Candidate	Votes
Social Credit	Lucien Plourde	13,136
Liberal	Jean-Paul Nolin	9,580
Progressive Conservative	Jacques Lavoie	3,160
New Democratic	Albert Simard	848
Independent SC	Magella Julien	373

1965 Canadian federal election
Party	Candidate	Votes
Liberal	Jean Marchand	10,669
Ralliement créditiste	Lucien Plourde	9,820
Progressive Conservative	Jacques Lavoie	3,454
New Democratic	Jean-Paul Bérubé	1,222
Ouvrier indépendant	Adélard Patry	298

== See also ==
- List of Canadian electoral districts
- Historical federal electoral districts of Canada
