= Leader of the Opposition in the Senate (Canada) =

Canadian Parliamentary position

- Chef de l'opposition au Sénat
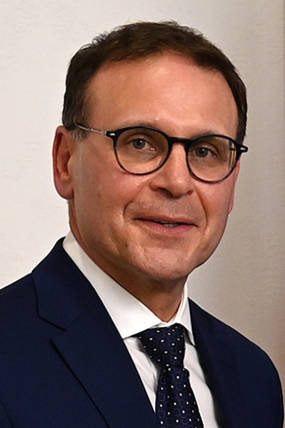
- Incumbent; Leo Housakos since May 14, 2025
- Style: The Honourable
- Member of: Senate of Canada
- Appointer: Elected by the caucus of the official opposition in the Senate
- Inaugural holder: Luc Letellier de St-Just
- Formation: 1 July 1867
- Deputy: Deputy leader of the Opposition in the Senate
- Salary: $223,900 (2024)

In Canada, the leader of the Opposition in the Senate (French: Chef de l'opposition au Sénat) is the leader of the largest party in the Senate not in government.

Even though the position's name is very similar to the leader of the Opposition in the House of Commons (the Opposition House leader), the leader of the Opposition in the Senate's role is more analogous to the leader of the Official Opposition because its holder is the leader of the party's Senate caucus. The responsibilities that, in the House of Commons, are done by the house leaders—including day-to-day scheduling of business—are undertaken in the Senate by Government and Opposition deputy leaders and Opposition whips.

== Selection ==
Since it is the House of Commons of Canada that determines what party(ies) form government, the size of party caucuses in the Senate bear no relation to which party forms the government side in the Senate and which party forms the opposition. Thus, the leader of the Opposition in the Senate may lead more senators than the leader of the Government in the Senate. Since senators normally have longer tenure than MPs, this is often the case immediately following a change in government, until the new prime minister can appoint more people from their party.

There are no set rules governing the manner in which the position is filled from within caucuses. When the Conservative Party (and its predecessor, the Progressive Conservative Party) have been in opposition, the party's Senate caucus has historically elected its own leader, although as noted by John Williams in a 1956 book on the Conservative Party, it may choose to follow the wishes of the national leader. The traditional practice of the Liberal party in opposition had been for the party leader to select their leader in the Senate.

The leader of the Opposition in the Senate is not necessarily from the same party as the opposition in the House of Commons. From 1993 until 2003, the leader of the Opposition in the Senate was a Progressive Conservative, though the Progressive Conservatives were not the Official Opposition in the House of Commons; this was because the Official Opposition in the Commons (Bloc Québécois, Reform, Canadian Alliance) did not have Senate representation. This scenario repeated itself following the results of the 2011 election that saw the Liberal Party lose Official Opposition status in the House to the New Democratic Party, but since the NDP had no representation in the Senate, the Liberals continued to form the Official Opposition in the Senate.

The Official Opposition also does not need to be linked to a party in the Commons. This was determined on January 29, 2014, after Liberal Party leader Justin Trudeau announced that all Liberal Senators would no longer be members of the national Liberal caucus. When the Senate met in the afternoon, Senator Jim Cowan informed the Senate that the Liberal Senators intended to self-designate as Liberals, as well as sit and act together as a caucus. Following a lengthy discussion, the Senate Speaker ruled that the Liberal Senators met the definition under the Senate rules of being a caucus of at least five Senators of the same political party, that the rules state that the leader of the Opposition in the Senate is the head of the party other than the government party with the most Senators, and that "as has been indicated by Senator Cowan, he has been elected by his colleagues and, therefore, meets the definition of the leader of the Opposition in the Senate." (Debates of the Senate, January 29, 2014).

== List of leaders of the Opposition in the Senate ==
No.	Portrait	Name (Birth–Death)	Term of office		Party
No.	Portrait	Name (Birth–Death)	Took office	Left office	Party
1		Luc Letellier de St-Just; Senator for Grandville, Quebec (1820–1881)	July 1, 1867	November 5, 1873	Liberal
2		Alexander Campbell; Senator for Cataraqui, Ontario (1822–1892)	November 5, 1873	October 8, 1878	Conservative
3		Sir Richard William Scott; Senator for Ottawa, Ontario (1825–1913)	October 8, 1878	April 27, 1896	Liberal
4		Sir Mackenzie Bowell; Senator for Hastings, Ontario (1823–1917)	April 27, 1896	March 1, 1906	Conservative
5 (1 of 2)		James Alexander Lougheed; Senator for Calgary, Alberta (1854–1925)	April 1, 1906	October 6, 1911	Conservative
6		Sir Richard John Cartwright; Senator for Oxford, Ontario (1835–1912)	October 6, 1911	September 24, 1912	Liberal
7		Sir George William Ross; Senator for Middlesex, Ontario (1841–1914)	September 24, 1912	March 7, 1914	Liberal
8 (1 of 2)		Hewitt Bostock; Senator for Kamloops, British Columbia (1864–1930)	March 19, 1914	January 1, 1919	Liberal
9 (1 of 3)		Raoul Dandurand; Senator for De Lorimier, Quebec (1861–1942)	January 1, 1919	December 31, 1919	Liberal
8 (2 of 2)		Hewitt Bostock; Senator for Kamloops, British Columbia (1864–1930)	January 1, 1920	December 28, 1921	Liberal
5 (2 of 2)		Sir James Alexander Lougheed; Senator for Calgary, Alberta (1854–1925)	December 28, 1921	November 2, 1925	Conservative
10 (1 of 2)		William Benjamin Ross; Senator for De Lorimier, Quebec (1855–1929)	January 1, 1926	June 28, 1926	Conservative
9 (2 of 3)		Raoul Dandurand; Senator for De Lorimier, Quebec (1861–1942)	June 29, 1926	December 31, 1926	Liberal
10 (2 of 2)		William Benjamin Ross; Senator for De Lorimier, Quebec (1855–1929)	December 31, 1926	January 10, 1929	Conservative
11		Wellington Willoughby; Senator for Moose Jaw, Saskatchewan (1859–1932)	January 11, 1929	August 7, 1930	Conservative
9 (3 of 3)		Raoul Dandurand; Senator for De Lorimier, Quebec (1861–1942)	August 7, 1930	October 22, 1935	Liberal
12		Arthur Meighen; Senator for St. Mary's, Ontario (1874–1960)	October 22, 1935	January 16, 1942	Conservative
13		Charles Ballantyne; Senator for Alma, Quebec (1867–1950)	January 16, 1942	September 11, 1945	Conservative
13		Charles Ballantyne; Senator for Alma, Quebec (1867–1950)	January 16, 1942	September 11, 1945	Progressive Conservative
14		John Thomas Haig; Senator for Winnipeg, Manitoba (1877–1962)	September 12, 1945	June 20, 1957	Progressive Conservative
15		William Ross Macdonald; Senator for Brantford, Ontario (1891–1976)	June 20, 1957	April 21, 1963	Liberal
16		Alfred Johnson Brooks; Senator for Royal, New Brunswick (1890–1967)	April 22, 1963	October 31, 1967	Progressive Conservative
17 (1 of 2)		Jacques Flynn; Senator for Rougemont, Quebec (1915–2000)	October 31, 1967	June 3, 1979	Progressive Conservative
18		Ray Perrault; Senator for North Shore-Burnaby, British Columbia (1926–2008)	June 3, 1979	March 2, 1980	Liberal
17 (2 of 2)		Jacques Flynn; Senator for Rougemont, Quebec (1915–2000)	March 3, 1980	September 16, 1984	Progressive Conservative
19		Allan MacEachen; Senator for Highlands-Canso, Nova Scotia (1921–2017)	September 16, 1984	November 30, 1991	Liberal
20		Royce Frith; Senator for Glen Tay, Ontario (1923–2005)	November 30, 1991	October 25, 1993	Liberal
21		John Lynch-Staunton; Senator for Grandville, Quebec (1930–2012)	October 25, 1993	September 30, 2004	Progressive Conservative
21		John Lynch-Staunton; Senator for Grandville, Quebec (1930–2012)	October 25, 1993	September 30, 2004	Conservative
22		Noël Kinsella; Senator for Fredericton-York-Sunbury, New Brunswick (1939–2023)	October 1, 2004	February 7, 2006	Conservative
23		Dan Hays; Senator for Calgary, Alberta (born 1939)	February 8, 2006	January 18, 2007	Liberal
24		Céline Hervieux-Payette; Senator for Bedford, Quebec (born 1941)	January 18, 2007	November 3, 2008	Liberal
25		Jim Cowan; Senator for Nova Scotia (born 1942)	November 3, 2008	November 5, 2015	Liberal
25		Jim Cowan; Senator for Nova Scotia (born 1942)	November 3, 2008	November 5, 2015	Senate Liberal Caucus
26		Claude Carignan; Senator for Mille Isles, Quebec (born 1964)	November 5, 2015	March 31, 2017	Conservative
27		Larry Smith; Senator for Saurel, Quebec (born 1951)	April 1, 2017	November 5, 2019	Conservative
28		Don Plett; Senator for Manitoba (born 1950)	November 5, 2019	May 14, 2025	Conservative
29		Leo Housakos; Senator for Quebec (Wellington) (born 1968)	May 14, 2025	Incumbent	Conservative

== See also ==
- Representative of the Government in the Senate
- Leader of the Opposition in the House of Commons (Canada)
- Leader of the Opposition (Canada)
