= Representative of the Government in the Senate =

Government representative in the Canadian Senate

- Représentant du gouvernement au Sénat
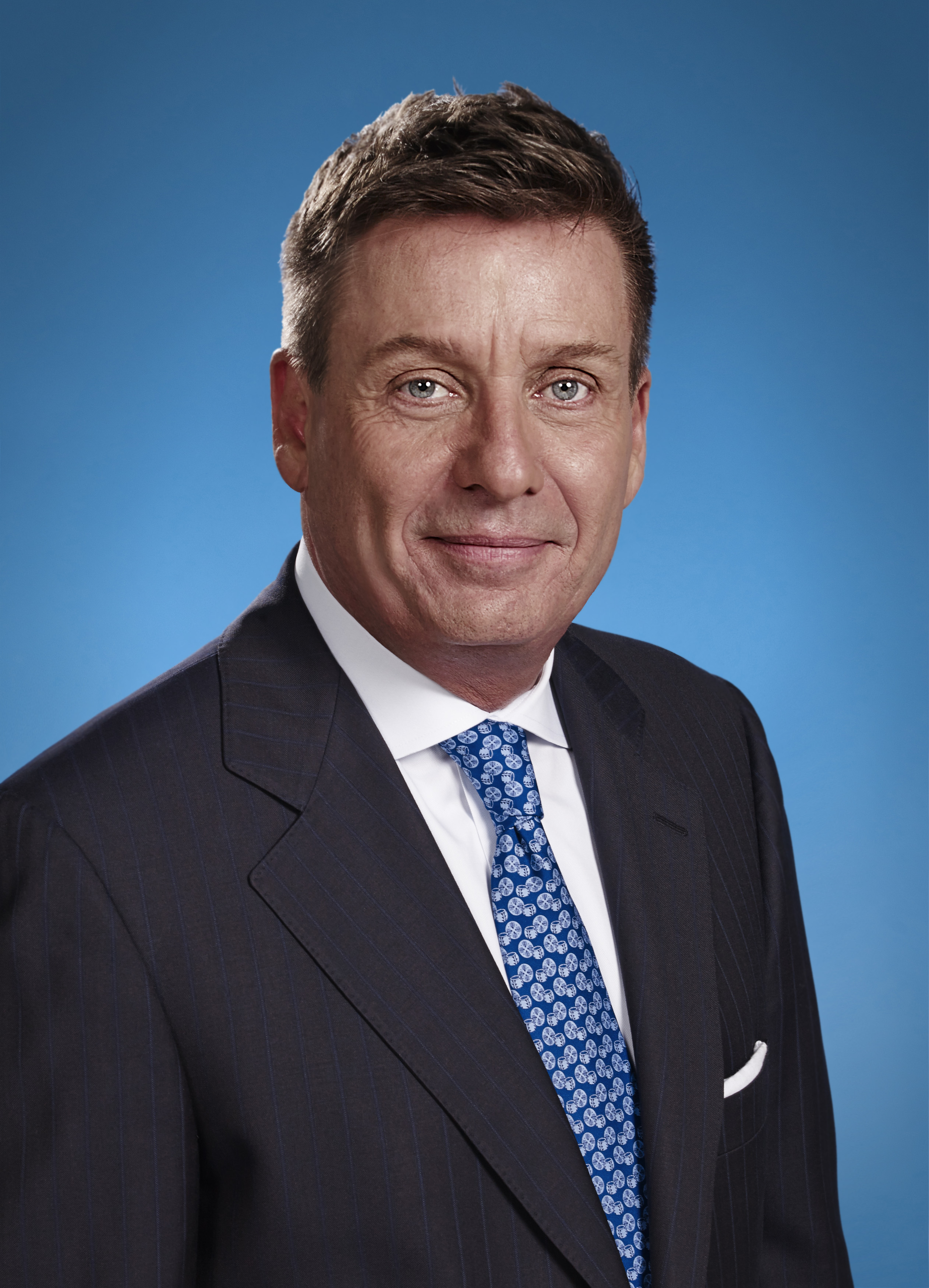
- Incumbent; Pierre Moreau since July 18, 2025
- Government Representative Office; Senate of Canada
- Style: The Honourable
- Member of: Senate; Privy Council
- Reports to: Prime Minister
- Appointer: Prime Minister
- Formation: July 1, 1867
- First holder: Alexander Campbell (as Leader of the Government)
- Salary: $275,000 (2024)
- Website: senate-gro.ca

The representative of the Government in the Senate (French: représentant du gouvernement au Sénat) is the member of the Senate of Canada who is responsible for introducing, promoting, and defending the government's bills in the Senate after they are passed by the House of Commons. The representative is appointed by the prime minister.

The position replaced the leader of the Government in the Senate (French: leader du gouvernement au Sénat), which from 1867 to 2015 was a senator who was a member of the governing party and led the government caucus in the Senate of Canada (whether or not that party held a majority in the Senate). The position of Leader had almost always been held by a Cabinet minister, except briefly in 1926, from 1958 to 1963 and from 2013 to the position being discontinued in 2015.

The government representative's counterpart on the Opposition benches is the leader of the Opposition in the Senate, who continues to be a member of the Official Opposition political party.

Senator Pierre Moreau has served as the third and most recent representative of the Government in the Senate since July 18, 2025.

== History ==
=== As Leader of the Government ===
Early Canadian cabinets included several senators who would be answerable to the Senate for government actions, one of whom would serve as de facto government leader in the Senate. In the nineteenth century, it was not considered unusual for a senator to be Prime Minister. Sir John Joseph Caldwell Abbott and Sir Mackenzie Bowell served as prime minister from the Senate. Abbott and Bowell both found it difficult to lead the government from the Senate, however, and over time, the perceived legitimacy of the Senate declined. Today, it is rare for senators to occupy prominent positions in cabinet. From 1935 on, it was typical for a cabinet to have only one senator who would have the position of minister without portfolio alongside the position of leader of the government in the Senate.

There have been a few rare occasions when the leader of the government in the Senate was not included in the cabinet by virtue of a separate ministerial appointment, such as William Benjamin Ross who served in the position in 1926, and Walter Morley Aseltine and Alfred Johnson Brooks who were not included in the cabinets of Prime Minister John Diefenbaker from 1958-1963. In 1968, the position of leader of the government in the Senate became an official Cabinet position in its own right with the appointment of Paul Martin, Sr. (father of Canada's future prime minister, Paul Martin). From July 2013, under Prime Minister Stephen Harper, the government leader in the Senate was again a non-cabinet minister.

Occasionally, senators still hold senior cabinet positions (other than the leader of the government in the Senate) in order to ensure regional balance in cabinet if the governing party is unable to elect members in a particular region or province, e.g., when the Progressive Conservative Party formed the government under the leadership of Joe Clark in 1979, and when the Liberal Party formed the government under the leadership of Pierre Trudeau in 1980. However, it is usually the case that the leader of the government in the Senate is the sole senator serving in Cabinet.

The responsibilities of the leader of the government in the Senate include:

1. Planning and managing the government's legislative program in the Senate
2. Answering all questions for the government during the Senate's Question Period
3. Maintaining relations with the opposition on all matters concerning Senate activities
4. Working with the leader of the Government in the House of Commons to ensure the effective coordination of the government's legislative programme.

The government side in the Senate is the party that forms the government in the House of Commons. This means that the government party in the Senate may have fewer seats than the opposition, particularly when a general election results in a new party forming government.

=== As Representative of the Government ===
Due to former Prime Minister Justin Trudeau's 2014 decision to remove senators from the Liberal Party of Canada caucus, leaving them all effectively sitting as independent senators, Trudeau named a Representative of the Government in the Senate in the 42nd Canadian Parliament rather than a government leader. The situation created some uncertainty about how the Senate would function, and how government legislation would be brought to the Senate. Retired civil servant Peter Harder was named to the position on March 18, 2016.

On November 29, 2019, the Prime Minister's office announced that Senator Harder would be stepping down from his position as Representative of the Government in the Senate effective December 31, 2019. It was also announced that Senator Grant Mitchell would retire as Government Liaison in the Senate but would continue until a replacement for Harder was named in "due course." On January 24, 2020, Prime Minister Justin Trudeau announced that Senator Marc Gold had agreed to become the new Government Representative in the Senate, sitting as a non-affiliated senator and would also be sworn in as a Privy Councillor. Gold served from January 24, 2020 until June 30, 2025, when he reached the mandatory retirement age of 75.

== Office holders ==
Key:

Liberal Party of Canada
Progressive Conservative Party of Canada
Conservative Party of Canada
Non-affiliated

No.	Portrait	Name (Birth–Death)	Term of office		Party	Prime minister (Ministry)
No.	Portrait	Name (Birth–Death)	Took office	Left office	Party	Prime minister (Ministry)
Leader of the Government in the Senate
1		Alexander Campbell; Senator for Cataraqui, Ontario (1822–1892)	July 1, 1867	November 5, 1873	Liberal-Conservative	Sir John A. Macdonald (1st)
2		Luc Letellier de St-Just; Senator for Grandville, Quebec (1820–1881)	November 5, 1873	December 14, 1876	Liberal	Alexander Mackenzie (2nd)
3		Richard William Scott; Senator for Ottawa, Ontario (1825–1913)	December 14, 1876	October 7, 1878	Liberal	Alexander Mackenzie (2nd)
(1)		Sir Alexander Campbell; Senator for Cataraqui, Ontario (1822–1892)	October 18, 1878	February 7, 1887	Conservative	Sir John A. Macdonald (3rd)
4		Sir John Abbott; Senator for Inkerman, Quebec (1821–1893)	May 12, 1887	June 6, 1891	Conservative	Sir John A. Macdonald (3rd)
4		Sir John Abbott; Senator for Inkerman, Quebec (1821–1893)	June 16, 1891	October 30, 1893	Conservative	Sir John Abbott (4th)
5		Sir Mackenzie Bowell; Senator for Hastings, Ontario (1823–1917)	October 31, 1893	December 12, 1894	Conservative	Sir John Thompson (5th)
5		Sir Mackenzie Bowell; Senator for Hastings, Ontario (1823–1917)	December 21, 1894	August 19, 1896	Conservative	Sir Mackenzie Bowell (6th)
5		Sir Mackenzie Bowell; Senator for Hastings, Ontario (1823–1917)	December 21, 1894	August 19, 1896	Conservative	Sir Charles Tupper (7th)
6		Sir Oliver Mowat; Senator for Ontario (1820–1903)	August 19, 1896	November 18, 1897	Liberal	Sir Wilfrid Laurier (8th)
7		David Mills; Senator for Bothwell, Ontario (1831–1903)	November 18, 1897	February 7, 1902	Liberal	Sir Wilfrid Laurier (8th)
(3)		Sir Richard William Scott; Senator for Ottawa, Ontario (1825–1913)	February 7, 1902	January 20, 1909	Liberal	Sir Wilfrid Laurier (8th)
8		Sir Richard John Cartwright; Senator for Oxford, Ontario (1835–1912)	January 20, 1909	October 10, 1911	Liberal	Sir Wilfrid Laurier (8th)
9		Sir James Alexander Lougheed; Senator for Calgary, Alberta (1854–1925)	October 10, 1911	December 28, 1921	Conservative	Sir Robert Borden (9th and 10th)
9		Sir James Alexander Lougheed; Senator for Calgary, Alberta (1854–1925)	October 10, 1911	December 28, 1921	Unionist	Sir Robert Borden (9th and 10th)
9		Sir James Alexander Lougheed; Senator for Calgary, Alberta (1854–1925)	October 10, 1911	December 28, 1921	Conservative	Arthur Meighen (11th)
10		Raoul Dandurand; Senator for De Lorimier, Quebec (1861–1942)	December 29, 1921	June 28, 1926	Liberal	William Lyon Mackenzie King (12th)
11		William Benjamin Ross (Note: Not in the Cabinet.); Senator for De Lorimier, Quebec (1855–1929)	June 28, 1926	September 24, 1926	Conservative	Arthur Meighen (13th)
(10)		Raoul Dandurand; Senator for De Lorimier, Quebec (1861–1942)	September 25, 1926	August 6, 1930	Liberal	William Lyon Mackenzie King (14th)
12		Wellington Willoughby; Senator for Moose Jaw, Saskatchewan (1859–1932)	August 7, 1930	February 3, 1932	Conservative	R. B. Bennett (15th)
13		Arthur Meighen; Senator for St. Mary's, Ontario (1874–1960)	February 3, 1932	October 22, 1935	Conservative	R. B. Bennett (15th)
(10)		Raoul Dandurand; Senator for De Lorimier, Quebec (1861–1942)	October 23, 1935	March 11, 1942	Liberal	William Lyon Mackenzie King (16th)
14		James Horace King; Senator for Kootenay East, British Columbia (1873–1955)	May 26, 1942	August 24, 1945	Liberal	William Lyon Mackenzie King (16th)
15		Wishart McLea Robertson; Senator for Shelburne, Nova Scotia (1891–1967)	August 24, 1945	October 14, 1953	Liberal	William Lyon Mackenzie King (16th)
15		Wishart McLea Robertson; Senator for Shelburne, Nova Scotia (1891–1967)	August 24, 1945	October 14, 1953	Liberal	Louis St. Laurent (17th)
16		William Ross Macdonald; Senator for Brantford, Ontario (1891–1976)	October 14, 1953	June 20, 1957	Liberal	Louis St. Laurent (17th)
17		John Thomas Haig; Senator for Winnipeg, Manitoba (1877–1962)	October 9, 1957	May 11, 1958	Progressive Conservative	John Diefenbaker (18th)
18		Walter Aseltine; Senator for Rosetown, Saskatchewan (1886–1971)	May 12, 1958	August 31, 1962	Progressive Conservative	John Diefenbaker (18th)
19		Alfred Johnson Brooks; Senator for Royal, New Brunswick (1890–1967)	August 31, 1962	April 21, 1963	Progressive Conservative	John Diefenbaker (18th)
(16)		William Ross Macdonald; Senator for Brantford, Ontario (1891–1976)	April 22, 1963	February 2, 1964	Liberal	Lester B. Pearson (19th)
20		John Joseph Connolly; Senator for Ottawa West, Ontario (1906–1982)	February 3, 1964	April 20, 1968	Liberal	Lester B. Pearson (19th)
21		Paul Martin Sr. (Note: Until April 1, 1969, Martin was, as had been typical, Minister without portfolio while holding the unofficial post of leader of the government in the Senate. Thereafter, Leader of the Government in the Senate became an official ministerial office.); Senator for Windsor-Walkerville, Ontario (1903–1992)	April 20, 1968	August 7, 1974	Liberal	Pierre Trudeau (20th)
22		Ray Perrault; Senator for North Shore-Burnaby, British Columbia (1926–2008)	August 8, 1974	June 3, 1979	Liberal	Pierre Trudeau (20th)
23		Jacques Flynn; Senator for Rougemont, Quebec (1915–2000)	June 4, 1979	March 2, 1980	Progressive Conservative	Joe Clark (21st)
(22)		Ray Perrault; Senator for North Shore-Burnaby, British Columbia (1926–2008)	March 3, 1980	September 29, 1982	Liberal	Pierre Trudeau (22nd)
24		Bud Olson; Senator for Alberta South, Alberta (1925–2002)	September 30, 1982	June 29, 1984	Liberal	Pierre Trudeau (22nd)
25		Allan MacEachen; Senator for Highlands-Canso, Nova Scotia (1921–2017)	June 30, 1984	September 16, 1984	Liberal	John Turner (23rd)
26		Dufferin Roblin; Senator for Red River, Manitoba (1917–2010)	September 17, 1984	June 29, 1986	Progressive Conservative	Brian Mulroney (24th)
27		Lowell Murray; Senator for Pakenham, Ontario (born 1936)	June 30, 1986	November 3, 1993	Progressive Conservative	Brian Mulroney (24th)
27		Lowell Murray; Senator for Pakenham, Ontario (born 1936)	June 30, 1986	November 3, 1993	Progressive Conservative	Kim Campbell (25th)
28		Joyce Fairbairn; Senator for Lethbridge, Alberta (1939–2022)	November 4, 1993	June 10, 1997	Liberal	Jean Chrétien (26th)
29		Alasdair Graham; Senator for The Highlands, Nova Scotia (1929–2015)	June 11, 1997	October 3, 1999	Liberal	Jean Chrétien (26th)
30		Bernie Boudreau; Senator for Nova Scotia (born 1944)	October 4, 1999	January 8, 2001	Liberal	Jean Chrétien (26th)
31		Sharon Carstairs; Senator for Manitoba (born 1942)	January 9, 2001	December 11, 2003	Liberal	Jean Chrétien (26th)
32		Jack Austin; Senator for Vancouver South, British Columbia (born 1932)	December 12, 2003	February 6, 2006	Liberal	Paul Martin (27th)
33		Marjory LeBreton; Senator for Ontario (born 1940)	February 6, 2006	July 14, 2013	Conservative	Stephen Harper (28th)
34		Claude Carignan; Senator for Mille Isles, Quebec (born 1964)	August 20, 2013	November 3, 2015	Conservative	Stephen Harper (28th)
Representative of the Government in the Senate
35		Peter Harder; Senator for Ottawa, Ontario (born 1952)	March 18, 2016	December 31, 2019	Non-affiliated (Note: Sits as non-affiliated but represents the Liberal government for the purposes of introducing legislation and acting as a liaison.)	Justin Trudeau (29)
36		Marc Gold; Senator for Stadacona, Quebec (born 1950)	January 24, 2020	June 30, 2025	Non-affiliated	Justin Trudeau (29)
37		Pierre Moreau; Senator for The Laurentides, Quebec (born 1957)	July 18, 2025	present	Non-affiliated	Mark Carney (30th)

== See also ==
- Leader of the Opposition in the Senate (Canada)
