= List of Nova Scotia senators =

This is a list of past and present members of the Senate of Canada representing the province of Nova Scotia. There are nine senators currently appointed with one vacancy.

During the Quebec Conference of 1864, Nova Scotia was guaranteed ten Senate seats, but because Prince Edward Island stalled for equal representation in the upper house, Nova Scotia was awarded two of Prince Edward Island's Senate seats, until 1873 when Prince Edward Island gave in and joined confederation Nova Scotia dropped to 10 seats. The province kept its extra seats until the first two senators ended their term after 1873, they were not replaced.

== Current senators ==
Name	Party	Division (Note: Senators are appointed to represent Nova Scotia. Each senator may choose to designate a geographic area within the province as their division.)	Date appointed	Appointed by (Note: Senators are appointed by the governor general on the recommendation of the prime minister.)	Mandatory retirement
Réjean Aucoin	Independent Senators Group	Nova Scotia	October 31, 2023	Trudeau, J.	July 4, 2030
Wanda Thomas Bernard	Progressive Senate Group	East Preston	November 10, 2016	Trudeau, J.	August 1, 2028
Mary Coyle	Independent Senators Group	Nova Scotia	December 4, 2017	Trudeau, J.	November 5, 2029
Rodger Cuzner	Progressive Senate Group	Nova Scotia	October 31, 2023	Trudeau, J.	November 4, 2030
Colin Deacon	Canadian Senators Group	Nova Scotia	June 15, 2018	Trudeau, J.	November 1, 2034
Tony Ince	Canadian Senators Group	Nova Scotia	March 7, 2025	Trudeau, J.	December 16, 2032
Stan Kutcher	Independent Senators Group	Nova Scotia	December 12, 2018	Trudeau, J.	December 16, 2026
Michael L. MacDonald	Conservative	Cape Breton	January 2, 2009	Harper	May 4, 2030
Paul Prosper	Canadian Senators Group	Nova Scotia	July 6, 2023	Trudeau, J.	November 4, 2039
Allister Surette	Independent Senators Group	Nova Scotia	December 19, 2024	Trudeau, J.	September 21, 2036

== Historical ==
Name	Party	Division (Note: Senators are appointed to represent Nova Scotia. Each senator may choose to designate a geographic area within the province as their division.)	Date appointed	Appointed by (Note: Senators are appointed by the governor general on the recommendation of the prime minister. Senators appointed by royal proclamation were appointed at the Senate's founding directly by Queen Victoria.)	End of term
William Johnston Almon	Liberal-Conservative	Halifax	April 15, 1879	Macdonald	February 18, 1901
John Hawkins Anderson	Liberal	Nova Scotia	October 23, 1867	Royal Proclamation	December 24, 1870
Thomas Dickson Archibald	Liberal-Conservative	North Sydney	October 23, 1867	Royal Proclamation	October 18, 1890
Augustus Irvine Barrow	Liberal	Halifax-Dartmouth	May 8, 1974	Trudeau, P. E.	February 15, 1988
Adam Carr Bell	Conservative	Pictou	October 23, 1911	Borden	October 30, 1912
Caleb Rand Bill	Liberal-Conservative	North Sydney	October 23, 1867	Royal Proclamation	February 1, 1872
Thomas Reuben Black	Liberal	Amherst	June 10, 1904	Laurier	September 14, 1905
Frederick Murray Blois	Progressive Conservative	Colchester-Hants	January 14, 1960	Diefenbaker	October 12, 1976
Bernie Boudreau	Liberal	Nova Scotia	October 4, 1999	Chrétien	October 26, 2000
John George Bourinot	Liberal-Conservative	Nova Scotia	October 23, 1867	Royal Proclamation	January 21, 1884
John MacLellan Buchanan	Conservative	Nova Scotia (Halifax)	September 12, 1990	Mulroney	April 22, 2006
Mary Alice Butts	Liberal	Nova Scotia	September 23, 1997	Chrétien	August 15, 1999
Thomas Cantley	Conservative	New Glasgow	July 20, 1935	Bennett	February 24, 1945
James William Carmichael	Liberal	Nova Scotia	December 31, 1898	Laurier	April 24, 1903
Daniel Christmas	Independent Senators Group	Nova Scotia	December 6, 2016	Trudeau, J.	January 31, 2023
Charles Edward Church	Liberal	Lunenburg	February 28, 1902	Laurier	January 3, 1906
Ezra Churchill	Liberal-Conservative	Nova Scotia	February 3, 1871	Macdonald	May 8, 1874
Ambroise-Hilaire Comeau	Liberal	Digby County	January 15, 1907	Laurier	August 25, 1911
Gerald J. Comeau	Conservative	Nova Scotia	August 30, 1990	Mulroney	November 30, 2013
Jane Cordy	Progressive Senators Group	Nova Scotia	June 9, 2000	Chrétien	November 18, 2024
Joseph Willie Comeau	Liberal	Clare	December 1, 1948	St. Laurent	January 10, 1966
Harold Joseph Connolly	Liberal	Halifax North	July 28, 1955	St. Laurent	May 14, 1979
Jim Cowan	Liberal	Nova Scotia	March 24, 2005	Martin	January 22, 2017
Ernest G. Cottreau	Liberal	South Western Nova	May 8, 1974	Trudeau, P. E.	January 28, 1989
Adam Brown Crosby	Conservative	Halifax	January 20, 1917	Borden	March 10, 1921
Nathaniel Curry	Conservative	Amherst	November 20, 1912	Borden	October 23, 1931
Rufus Curry	Liberal	Nova Scotia	March 12, 1903	Laurier	March 30, 1905
William Dennis	Independent Conservative	Halifax	November 20, 1912	Borden	July 11, 1920
William Henry Dennis	Conservative	Halifax	February 3, 1932	Bennett	January 18, 1954
Robert Barry Dickey	Conservative	Amherst	October 23, 1867	Royal Proclamation	July 14, 1903
Fred Dickson	Conservative	Halifax	January 2, 2009	Harper	February 9, 2012
Richard Donahoe	Progressive Conservative	Halifax	September 13, 1979	Clark	September 27, 1984
William Duff	Liberal	Lunenburg	February 28, 1936	King	April 25, 1953
Edward Matthew Farrell	Liberal	Liverpool	January 12, 1910	Laurier	August 6, 1931
John Michael William Curphey Forrestall	Conservative	Nova Scotia (Dartmouth/Eastern Shore)	September 27, 1990	Mulroney	June 9, 2006
Edward Lavin Girroir	Conservative	Antigonish	November 20, 1912	Borden	May 8, 1932
Alasdair Bernard Graham	Liberal	The Highlands	April 27, 1972	Trudeau, P. E.	May 21, 2004
Robert Patterson Grant	Liberal	Pictou	February 2, 1877	Mackenzie	November 13, 1892
Stephen Greene	Canadian Senators Group	Halifax – The Citadel	January 2, 2009	Harper	December 8, 2024
Paul Lacombe Hatfield	Liberal	Yarmouth	October 7, 1926	King	January 28, 1935
Charles G. Hawkins	Liberal	Milford-Hants	May 2, 1950	St. Laurent	August 14, 1958
Henry Davies Hicks	Liberal	The Annapolis Valley	April 27, 1972	Trudeau, P. E.	March 5, 1990
John Holmes	Conservative	Nova Scotia	October 23, 1867	Royal Proclamation	June 3, 1876
Gordon Benjamin Isnor	Liberal	Halifax-Dartmouth	May 2, 1950	St. Laurent	March 17, 1973
Henry Kaulback	Conservative	Lunenburg	March 27, 1872	Macdonald	January 8, 1896
Edward Kenny	Conservative	Nova Scotia	October 23, 1867	Royal Proclamation	April 11, 1876
John James Kinley	Liberal	Queens-Lunenburg	April 18, 1945	King	June 12, 1971
Michael J. L. Kirby	Liberal	Nova Scotia (South Shore)	January 13, 1984	Trudeau, P. E.	October 31, 2006
John Locke	Liberal	Nova Scotia	October 23, 1867	Royal Proclamation	December 12, 1873
Hance James Logan	Liberal	Cumberland	February 5, 1929	King	December 26, 1944
John Lovitt	Liberal	Yarmouth	December 18, 1896	Laurier	April 13, 1908
Finlay MacDonald	Progressive Conservative	Halifax	December 21, 1984	Mulroney	January 4, 1998
John Alexander Macdonald	Conservative	Richmond West-Cape Breton	March 2, 1932	Bennett	June 11, 1945
John Michael Macdonald	Progressive Conservative	Cape Breton	June 24, 1960	Diefenbaker	June 20, 1997
Allan MacEachen	Liberal	Highlands-Canso	June 29, 1984	Trudeau, P. E.	July 6, 1996
Alexander MacFarlane	Conservative	Wallace	October 10, 1870	Macdonald	December 14, 1898
David MacKeen	Conservative	Cape Breton	February 21, 1896	Bowell	October 15, 1915
Donald MacLennan	Liberal	Margaree Forks	January 29, 1940	King	October 19, 1953
Peter Francis Martin	Conservative	Halifax	December 5, 1921	Meighen	May 2, 1935
John McCormick	Conservative	Sydney Mines	September 21, 1921	Meighen	February 21, 1936
Jonathan McCully	Liberal	Nova Scotia	October 23, 1867	Royal Proclamation	September 28, 1870
John Alexander McDonald	Liberal	King's	April 18, 1945	King	April 16, 1962
William McDonald	Conservative	Cape Breton	May 12, 1884	Macdonald	July 4, 1916
James Drummond McGregor	Liberal	New Glasgow	April 24, 1903	Laurier	October 1, 1910
Tom McInnis	Conservative	Nova Scotia	September 6, 2012	Harper	April 9, 2020
Thomas McKay	Liberal-Conservative	Colchester	December 24, 1881	Macdonald	January 13, 1912
William McKay	Conservative	Cape Breton	November 20, 1912	Borden	November 8, 1915
Archibald McLelan	Liberal-Conservative	Londonderry	June 21, 1869	Macdonald	May 20, 1881
John Stewart McLennan	Conservative	Sydney	February 10, 1916	Borden	September 15, 1939
Terry Mercer	Liberal	Northend Halifax	November 7, 2003	Chrétien	May 6, 2022
William Miller	Liberal-Conservative	Richmond	October 23, 1867	Royal Proclamation	February 23, 1912
Wilfred P. Moore	Liberal	Chester; Stanhope St. / South Shore (Note: Division designated as Chester from 1996 to 1999 and as Stanhope St. / South Shore since 1999.)	September 26, 1996	Chrétien	January 14, 2017
Robert Muir	Progressive Conservative	Cape Breton-The Sydneys	March 26, 1979	Trudeau, P. E.	November 10, 1994
Margaret Norrie	Liberal	Colchester-Cumberland	April 27, 1972	Trudeau, P. E.	October 16, 1980
Jeremiah Northup	Liberal	Halifax	October 10, 1870	Macdonald	April 10, 1879
Clement O'Leary	Progressive Conservative	Antigonish-Guysborough	September 25, 1962	Diefenbaker	June 12, 1969
Kelvin Ogilvie	Conservative	Annapolis Valley – Hants	August 27, 2009	Harper	November 6, 2017
Donald H. Oliver	Conservative	South Shore	September 7, 1990	Mulroney	November 16, 2013
Gerard Phalen	Liberal	Nova Scotia	October 4, 2001	Chrétien	March 28, 2009
Lawrence Geoffrey Power	Liberal	Halifax	February 2, 1877	Mackenzie	September 12, 1921
Clarence Primrose	Liberal-Conservative	Pictou	November 28, 1892	Abbott	December 2, 1902
Felix Patrick Quinn	Conservative	Bedford-Halifax	July 20, 1935	Bennett	March 28, 1961
Edgar Nelson Rhodes	Conservative	Amherst	July 20, 1935	Bennett	March 15, 1942
John William Ritchie	Conservative	Nova Scotia	October 23, 1867	Royal Proclamation	September 28, 1870
Wishart McLea Robertson	Liberal	Shelburne	February 19, 1943	King	December 24, 1965
Jean-Louis Philippe Robicheau	Conservative	Digby-Clare	July 20, 1935	Bennett	March 1, 1948
William Roche	Liberal	Halifax	January 12, 1910	Laurier	October 19, 1925
William Ross	Liberal	Victoria	May 18, 1905	Laurier	March 17, 1912
William Benjamin Ross	Conservative	Middleton	November 20, 1912	Borden	January 10, 1929
Calvin Woodrow Ruck	Liberal	Nova Scotia	June 11, 1998	Chrétien	September 4, 2000
Donald Smith	Liberal	Queens-Shelburne	July 28, 1955	St. Laurent	July 7, 1980
George Isaac Smith	Progressive Conservative	Colchester	August 7, 1975	Trudeau, P. E.	December 19, 1982
John Stanfield	Conservative	Colchester	February 17, 1921	Meighen	January 22, 1934
John Benjamin Stewart	Liberal	Antigonish-Guysborough	January 13, 1984	Trudeau, P. E.	November 19, 1999
Charles Elliott Tanner	Conservative	Pictou	January 20, 1917	Borden	January 13, 1946
Edward Joseph Thériault	Liberal	Nova Scotia	April 20, 1968	Trudeau, P. E.	December 20, 1968
Earl Wallace Urquhart	Liberal	Inverness-Richmond	February 24, 1966	Pearson	August 17, 1971
Frank Corbett Welch	Progressive Conservative	King's	September 25, 1962	Diefenbaker	July 14, 1975
Benjamin Wier	Liberal	Nova Scotia	October 23, 1867	Royal Proclamation	April 14, 1868

== Maritimes regional senators ==
Senators listed were appointed to represent the Maritimes under section 26 of the Constitution Act. This clause has only been used once before to appoint two extra senators to represent four regional Senate divisions: Ontario, Quebec, the Maritimes and the Western Provinces.

As vacancies open up among the normal members of the Senate, they are automatically filled by the regional senators. Regional senators may also designate themselves to a senate division in any province of their choosing in their region.

Name	Party (Note: Party listed was the last party of which the senator was a member.)	Division (Note: Senators are appointed to represent their region. Each senator may choose to designate a geographic area within their region as their division.)	Date appointed	Appointed by (Note: Senators are appointed by the governor general on the recommendation of the prime minister.)	Date shifted to provincial	Province shifted to	Provincial seat vacated by	End of term
Michael Forrestall	Conservative	Dartmouth/Eastern Shore, NS	September 27, 1990	Mulroney	November 10, 1994	Nova Scotia	Robert Muir	June 9, 2006
James W. Ross	Progressive Conservative	Maritimes divisional	September 27, 1990	Mulroney	April 26, 1991	New Brunswick	Richard Hatfield	May 25, 1993

== See also ==
- Lists of Canadian senators
