= Lougheed House =

Canadian Historic Victorian mansion in Calgary, Alberta

- Beaulieu National Historic Site of Canada
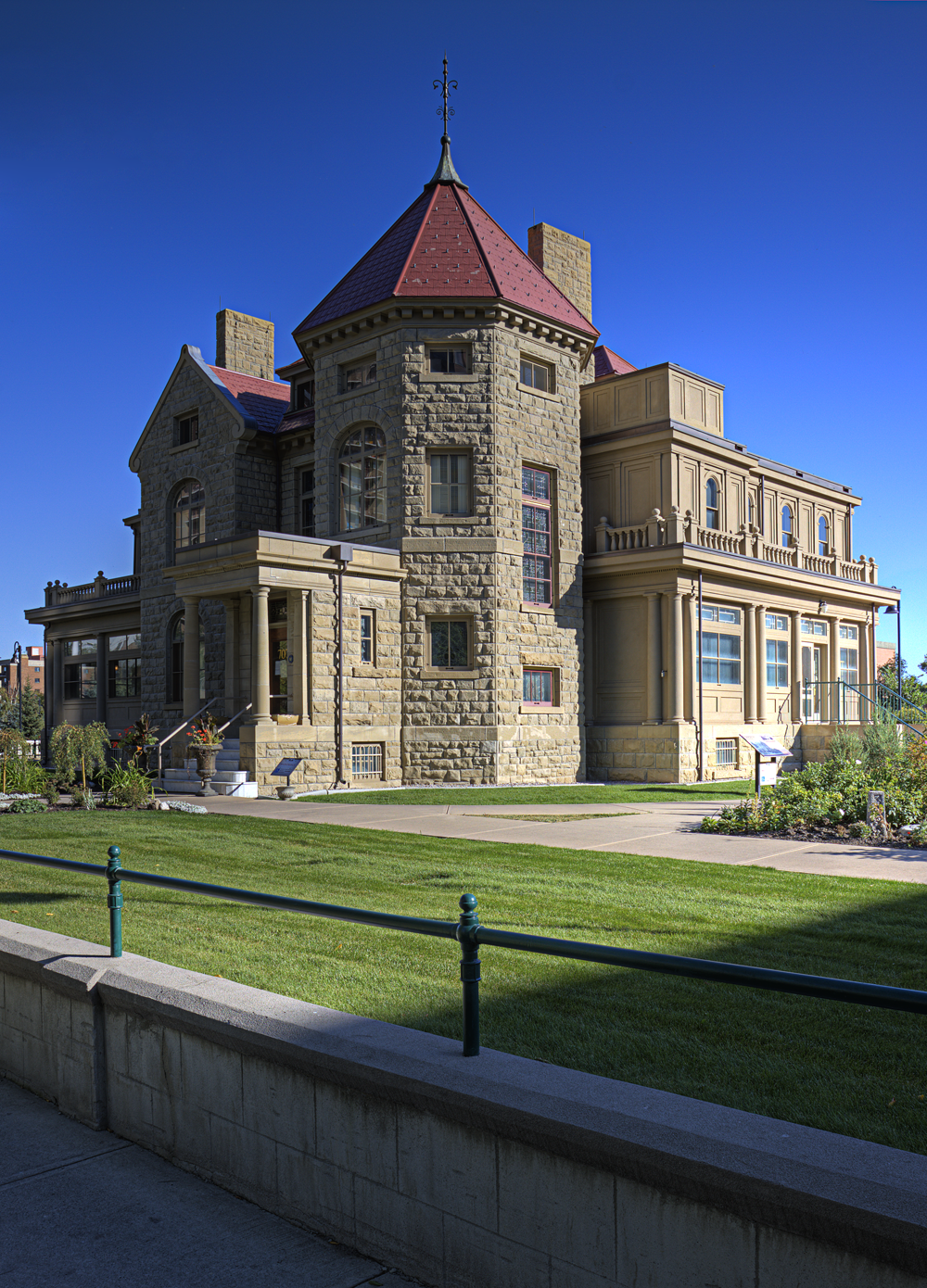
- Lougheed House Calgary
- Interactive map of Lougheed House
- 51.040591°N 114.07715°W
- Type: Mansion
- Location: Calgary, Alberta, Canada

History
- Built: 1891
- Built for: Senator James Alexander Lougheed

Site notes
- Architect: James R. Bowes
- Architectural style: Queen Anne
- Governing body: Lougheed House Conservation Society
- Website: Lougheed House

National Historic Site of Canada
- Official name: Beaulieu National Historic Site of Canada
- Designated: June 10, 1992

Alberta Historic Resources Act
- Official name: Senator Lougheed Residence
- Designated: November 29, 1977

Lougheed House, or as it was originally known Beaulieu, (French meaning "beautiful place") is a National Historic Site located in the Beltline district of Calgary, Alberta. Originally constructed in 1891 as a home for Senator James Alexander Lougheed and his wife, the structure has since become an iconic heritage building in Calgary. Lougheed House is operated by Lougheed House Conservation Society, an independent, non-profit society devoted to the restoration and public enjoyment of the historic house and its Gardens.

Over its long history, Lougheed House served many roles, including as a family residence, a training centre for young women, a women's military barracks and a Red Cross blood donor clinic. Then, for many years, it sat unused until its restoration started in 2000.

== Description ==
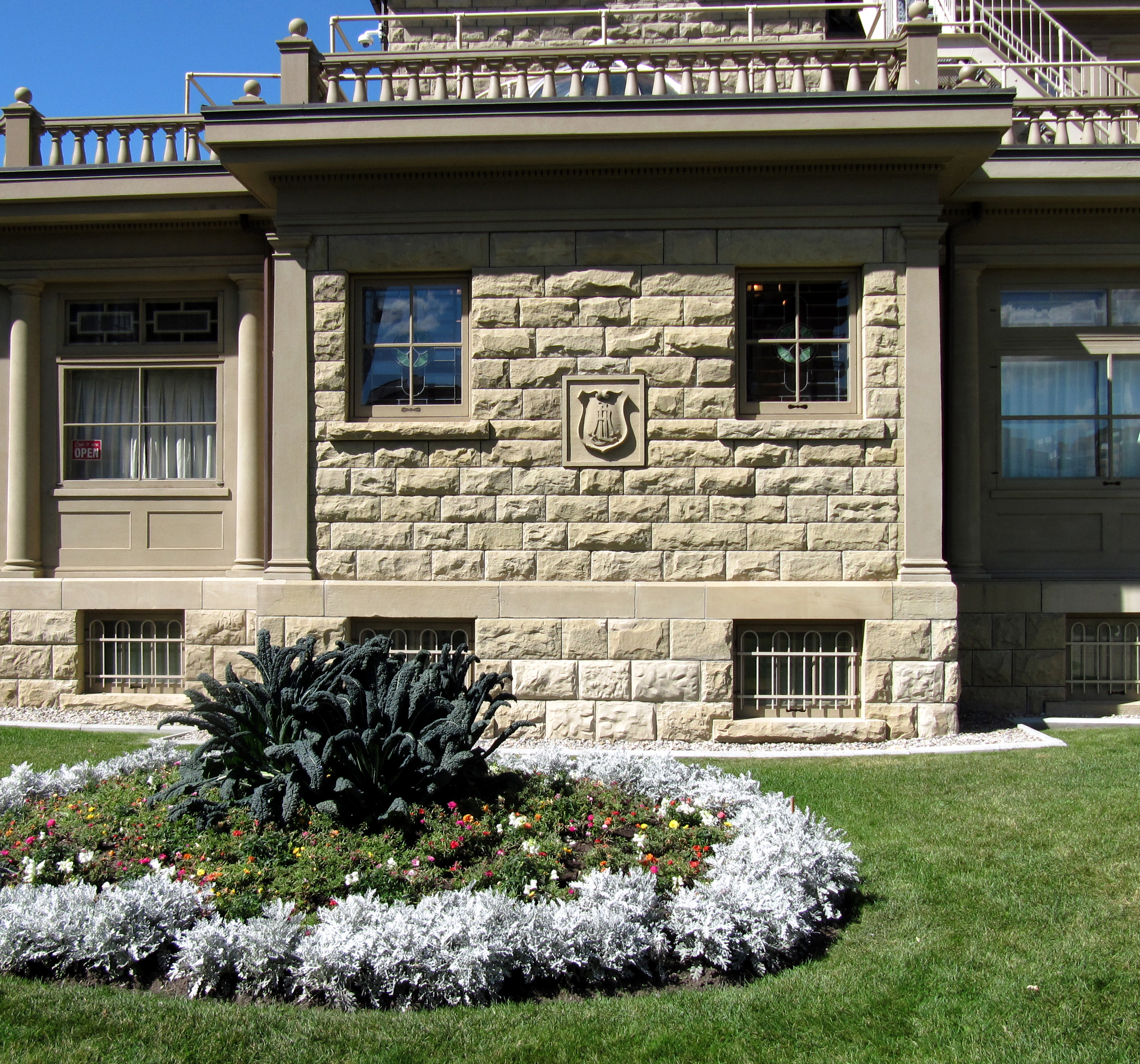
Detail of the east wall of Lougheed House.

Lougheed House is a 1,300 square metre (14,000 square foot) mansion designed by James C. Bowes to incorporate High Victorian aesthetics and is influenced by Queen Anne Revival style. This is evident through the rough-faced sandstone exterior, asymmetrical massing, and corner towers. Influences of Romanesque Revival is found with the steep roof, and the cone shaped towers emanate French Chateau architecture. The mansion was constructed with what was considered at the time "modern luxuries" including running hot water and electricity. The interior of the 48-room house is decorated with Spanish mahogany, Italian marble, stained glass windows and doors, and hand-painted images of Alberta flora and fauna.

The mansion was built of sandstone per the municipal building code as a result of the Calgary Fire of 1886. Upon the homes completion it included a billiards room, smoking room, drawing room, four large bedrooms on the second floor, and six large rooms on the third floor. Following completion of construction the Calgary Herald described the Lougheed House as "In design, solidity, accommodation and furnishings it leaves nothing to be desired."

=== Beaulieu Gardens ===
The Beaulieu Gardens which surround Lougheed House and were part of the original formal garden of the mansion are operated as a municipal park by the City of Calgary Parks Department.

=== Historic site status ===
On November 29, 1977, Lougheed House was designated the "Senator Lougheed Residence", an Alberta Provincial Historic Resource, due in part to the mansion's association with James Lougheed, and its representation of upper-class sandstone architecture from the period.

On June 10, 1992, Lougheed House was designated "Beaulieu National Historic Site of Canada", a National Historic Site. This was due in part to the mansion being a rare example of an upper-middle class eclectic mansion on the Canadian Prairies.

== History ==
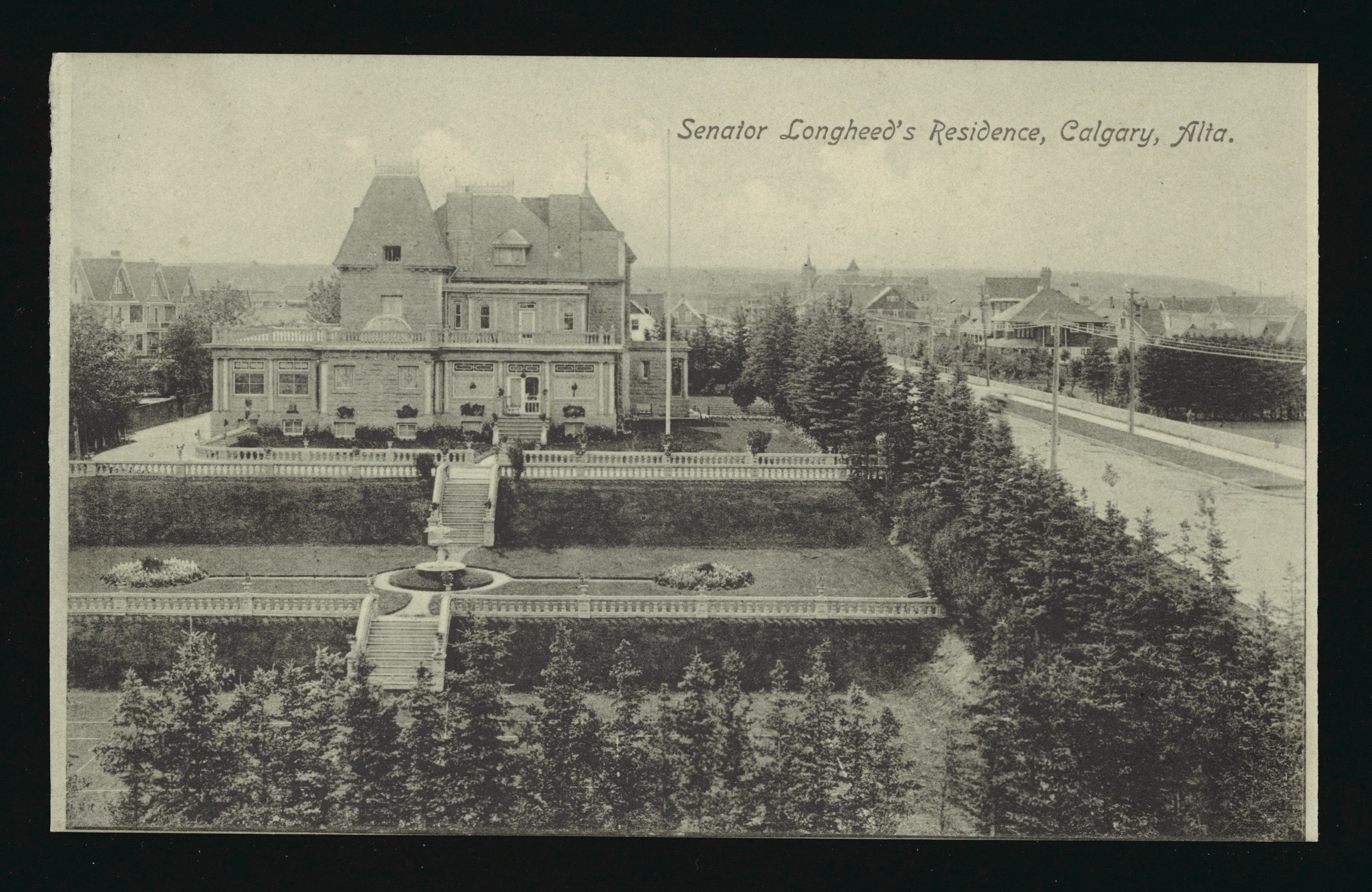
Senator James Alexander Lougheed's Residence (Lougheed House), Calgary, Alberta, 1912

James Lougheed was appointed to the Senate of Canada in 1889 by Sir John A. Macdonald, Lougheed was appointed to replace the deceased Richard Charles Hardisty, Lougheed's wife's uncle, James Alexander Lougheed commissioned a new mansion on the outskirts of Calgary for his wife, Isabella Hardisty Lougheed, and their two sons, Clarence and Norman. Following the move to the large mansion, the Lougheeds had four more children: Edgar, Dorothy, Douglas and Marjorie and the house was enlarged in 1907 to accommodate the family and their large social calendar. The mansion quickly became the center of the Calgary social scene, hosting a number of parties and galas. The Lougheeds hosted Governor General Prince Arthur, Duke of Connaught and Strathearn, his wife Princess Louise Margaret of Prussia and daughter Princess Patricia; and in 1919 Edward, Prince of Wales was the guest of honour at a garden party held in the mansion.

=== Post-Lougheed era ===
The Lougheed estate continued to own the property following James Lougheed's death in 1925 until 1934 when the estate was unable to pay the municipal property taxes and the City of Calgary took possession of the home. The City allowed Lougheed's widow and children to continue to live in the house until Isabella's death in 1936, and finally Norman A. Lougheed moved his family out in 1938.

Lougheed House was used during the Second World War, the upper floors were as a barracks for the Canadian Women's Army Corps and basement was used by the Canadian Red Cross as a blood donor clinic. Following the war, Lougheed House was used as an annex for the YMCA. In 1978, following the Alberta Provincial Historic Resource designation, the Province of Alberta took possession of the house and began restoring the property. The provincial government designation and purchase occurred during the Premiership of Peter Lougheed, James Lougheed's grandson. Despite the purchase, Peter Lougheed was reluctant to see public funds spent on restoring the house while he was premier.

The Lougheed House Conservation Society was created in 1995 after local lobbying began to see the mansion and grounds restored to their former glory. The City of Calgary purchased surrounding areas in the early 1990s with the intention of creating an outdoor public space, and construction began in 1997 to rebuild the Beaulieu Gardens, and restore the mansion.

== In popular culture ==
Netflix series Can This Love Be Translated? which follows the romance between interpreter Joo Ho-jin and actress Cha Mu-hee, was filmed inside the building in October 2024.

== Bibliography ==
- Cook Bobrovitz, Jennifer and Cowan, Trudy (2006). Lougheed House: More than a century of stories....Calgary: McCallum Printing Group Inc. ISBN 0-9780544-1-5
