= List of British Columbia senators =

This is a list of past and present members of the Senate of Canada representing the province of British Columbia.

Under the British Columbia Terms of Union, 1871, the province was originally represented by three senators. The Constitution Act, 1915 increased British Columbia by three seats, to its current number of six.

The Constitution Act, 1915 also amended Section 26 of the Constitution Act, 1867 to add a fourth regional division, called the Western Provinces, made up of British Columbia, Alberta, Saskatchewan and Manitoba, to allow two senators to be appointed on a regional basis.

== Current ==
Name	Party	Division^{1}	Date appointed	Appointed by^{2}	Mandatory retirement
Bev Busson	Independent Senators Group	British Columbia	September 24, 2018	Trudeau, J.	August 23, 2026
Baltej Singh Dhillon	Independent Senators Group	British Columbia	July 25, 2025	Trudeau, J.	November 13, 2041
Margo Lainne Greenwood	Independent Senators Group	British Columbia	November 10, 2022	Trudeau, J.	September 2, 2028
Yonah Martin	Conservative	British Columbia	January 2, 2009	Harper	April 11, 2040
Duncan Wilson	Progressive Senate Group	British Columbia	February 28, 2025	Trudeau, J.	September 26, 2042
Yuen Pau Woo	Independent Senators Group	British Columbia	November 10, 2016	Trudeau, J.	March 2, 2038

Notes:

^{1} Senators are appointed to represent British Columbia. Each senator may choose to designate a geographic area within the province as his or her division.
^{2} Senators are appointed by the governor general on the recommendation of the prime minister.

== Historical ==
Name	Party	Division^{1}	Date appointed	Appointed by	Retired
Larry Campbell	Non-affiliated	British Columbia	August 2, 2005	Martin	February 28, 2023
Jack Austin	Liberal	Vancouver South	August 19, 1975	Trudeau, P. E.	March 2, 2007
George Henry Barnard	Progressive Conservative	Victoria	October 23, 1917	Borden	November 8, 1945
Nancy Bell	Liberal	Nanaimo-Malaspina	October 7, 1970	Trudeau, P. E.	November 29, 1989
Hewitt Bostock	Liberal	Kamloops	June 6, 1904	Laurier	April 28, 1930
Patricia Carney	Conservative	British Columbia	August 30, 1990	Mulroney	January 31, 2008
Robert Carrall	Conservative	British Columbia	December 13, 1871	Macdonald	September 19, 1879
Clement Francis Cornwall	Conservative	Ashcroft	December 13, 1871	Macdonald	July 1, 1881
Sanford Johnston Crowe	Liberal-Unionist	Burrard	December 1, 1921	Meighen	August 23, 1931
John Wallace de Beque Farris	Liberal	Vancouver South	January 9, 1937	King	February 25, 1970
Ross Fitzpatrick	Liberal	Okanagan-Similkameen	March 6, 1998	Chrétien	February 4, 2008
Robert Francis Green	Conservative	Kootenay	October 3, 1921	Meighen	October 5, 1946
Nancy Greene Raine	Conservative	Thompson-Okanagan-Kootenay	January 2, 2009	Harper	May 11, 2018
Nancy Hodges	Liberal	Victoria	November 5, 1953	St. Laurent	June 12, 1965
Mobina Jaffer	Independent Senators Group	British Columbia	June 13, 2001	Chrétien	August 20, 2024
James Horace King	Liberal	Kootenay East	June 7, 1930	King	July 14, 1955
Arthur Laing	Liberal	Vancouver South	September 1, 1972	Trudeau, P. E.	February 12, 1975
Edward M. Lawson	Independent	Vancouver	October 7, 1970	Trudeau, P. E.	September 24, 2004
William John Macdonald	Conservative	Victoria	December 13, 1871	Macdonald	April 13, 1915
Ian Alistair Mackenzie	Independent Liberal	Vancouver Centre	January 19, 1948	King	September 2, 1949
Norman MacKenzie	Independent Liberal	University-Point Grey	February 24, 1966	Pearson	January 5, 1969
Leonard Marchand	Liberal	Kamloops-Cariboo	June 29, 1984	Trudeau, P. E.	March 1, 1998
Charles McDonald	Liberal	British Columbia	December 30, 1935	King	October 6, 1936
Gerry McGeer	Liberal	Vancouver-Burrard	June 9, 1945	King	August 11, 1947
Thomas Robert McInnes	Independent	Ashcroft	December 24, 1881	Macdonald	November 18, 1897
Stanley McKeen	Liberal	Vancouver	January 27, 1947	King	December 1, 1966
Alexander Duncan McRae	Conservative	Vancouver	September 4, 1931	Bennett	June 26, 1946
Hugh Nelson	Liberal-Conservative	Barkerville	December 12, 1879	Macdonald	March 1, 1887
Richard Neufeld	Conservative	British Columbia	January 2, 2009	Harper	November 16, 2019
John Lang Nichol	Liberal	Lion's Gate	February 24, 1966	Pearson	April 19, 1973
Ray Perrault	Liberal	North Shore-Burnaby	October 5, 1973	Trudeau, P. E.	February 6, 2001
Albert Planta	Conservative	Nanaimo	June 26, 1917	Borden	December 11, 1935
James Reid	Liberal-Conservative	Cariboo	October 8, 1888	Macdonald	May 3, 1904
Thomas Reid	Liberal	New Westminster	September 7, 1949	St. Laurent	October 14, 1967
George Riley	Liberal	Victoria	March 22, 1906	Laurier	January 19, 1916
Lytton Shatford	Conservative	Vancouver	June 26, 1917	Borden	November 8, 1920
Sydney John Smith	Liberal	Kamloops	January 3, 1957	St. Laurent	December 31, 1968
Gerry St. Germain	Conservative	Langley-Pemberton-Whistler	June 23, 1993	Mulroney	November 6, 2012
James Davis Taylor	Conservative	New Westminster	October 23, 1917	Borden	May 11, 1941
William Templeman	Liberal	New Westminster	November 18, 1897	Laurier	February 16, 1906
James Gray Turgeon	Liberal	Cariboo	January 27, 1947	King	February 14, 1964
George Van Roggen	Liberal	Vancouver-Points Grey	November 4, 1971	Trudeau, P. E.	June 8, 1992
Guy Williams	Liberal	Richmond	December 9, 1971	Trudeau, P. E.	October 7, 1982

Notes:

^{1} Senators are appointed to represent British Columbia. Each senator may choose to designate a geographic area within the province as his or her division.
^{2} Senators are appointed by the governor general on the recommendation of the prime minister.

== Western provinces regional senators ==
Senators listed were appointed to represent the Western Provinces under section 26 of the Constitution Act. This clause has only been used once before to appoint two extra senators to represent four regional Senate divisions: Ontario, Quebec, the Maritimes and the Western Provinces.

As vacancies open up among the normal members of the Senate, they are automatically filled by the regional senators. Regional senators may also designate themselves to a senate division in any province of their choosing in their region.

Name	Party^{1}	Division^{2}	Date appointed	Appointed by^{3}	Date shifted to provincial	Province shifted to	Provincial seat vacated by	End of term
Janis Johnson	Conservative	Winnipeg-Interlake	September 27, 1990	Mulroney	October 4, 1990	Manitoba	Joseph-Philippe Guay	September 27, 2016
Eric Berntson	Progressive Conservative	Saskatchewan	September 27, 1990	Mulroney	January 26, 1991	Saskatchewan	David Steuart	February 27, 2001

Notes:

^{1} Party listed was the last party of which the senator was a member.
^{2} Senators are appointed to represent their region. Each senator may choose to designate a geographic area within their region as his or her division.
^{3} Senators are appointed by the governor general on the recommendation of the prime minister.

== See also ==
- Lists of Canadian senators
