= Wellington Willoughby =

Canadian politician

William Bartley Willoughby MLA

Leader of the Opposition (Saskatchewan)
- In office 1912–1917
- Preceded by: Frederick Haultain
- Succeeded by: Donald Maclean

Personal details
- Born: August 10, 1859 Caledon, Ontario, Canada
- Died: August 1, 1932 (aged 72)
- Party: Conservative Party of Saskatchewan

Wellington Bartley Willoughby, PC (August 10, 1859 – August 1, 1932) was a Canadian politician and lawyer.

== Background ==
He stood for a seat in the federal House of Commons for the Conservative Party in a by-election in 1895, but lost to an unofficial Tory, William Stubbs. Stubbs was backed by the Orange Order, including its Grand Master N.C. Wallace and the McCarthyite leader Dalton McCarthy. They undermined Willoughby's campaign, though he was also an Orangeman.

Willoughby served as leader of the Saskatchewan Conservative Party and leader of the opposition from 1912 to 1917 and was Member of the Legislative Assembly of Saskatchewan (MLA) for the city of Moose Jaw.

He resigned from the Saskatchewan legislature shortly after his re-election in the 1917 election in order to accept an appointment to the Senate of Canada by Prime Minister Robert Borden.

In 1929, the leader of the federal Conservative Party, Richard Bennett, appointed Willoughby to the position of Leader of the Opposition in the Senate. When Bennett became Prime Minister of Canada following the 1930 federal election, Willoughby became Government Leader in the Senate and a minister without portfolio in the Canadian Cabinet.

== Personal life ==
Willoughby was born August 10, 1859 in Caledon, Ontario, to John and Margaret Willoughby, two Episcopalian Methodists who worked as farmers. He had seven siblings: William, who was 4 years older, Lydia, Samuel, Caroline, Wesley, John, and Margaret, who were all younger.

In October 1892, Wellington married Susan Thomas Jones of Germantown, Philadelphia. His wife died on June 27, 1907, of endocarditis.

He died August 1, 1932, of throat cancer. He is buried at the Rosedale Cemetery in Moose Jaw, Saskatchewan.

Party political offices
Preceded by New position	Leader of the Conservative Party of Saskatchewan; 1912–1917	Succeeded by Donald Maclean
Government offices
Preceded by William Benjamin Ross	Leader of the Opposition in the Senate of Canada; 1926–1929	Succeeded by Raoul Dandurand
Preceded by Raoul Dandurand	Leader of the Government in the Senate of Canada; 1930-1932	Succeeded by Arthur Meighen
