= Marian Noel Sherman =

English-born Canadian physician and humanist

- Born: Marian Noel Bostock; 25 December 1891; Epsom, England
- Died: 18 August 1975 (aged 83); British Columbia
- Occupation: Physician

Marian Noel Sherman (nee Bostock, 25 December 1891 – 18 August 1975), was an English-born Canadian physician and humanist.

== Early life ==
Marian Noel Bostock was born in Christmas Day 1891 in Epsom, the eldest daughter of Hewitt Bostock and Lizzie Jean McCombie Cowie Bostock. Her father was a publisher and politician, who served in both houses of the Canadian legislature. She spent her childhood on Vancouver Island, and at the Bostock family ranch in Kamloops. She returned to England at age 15 to complete her education at Prior's Field. She gained her medical qualifications at the London School of Medicine in 1917, and became a fellow of the Royal College of Surgeons in 1921.

== Career ==
Marian Bostock served as an acting house physician at the Queens Hospital for Children in Hackney, and as house surgeon at St. George's Hospital in London, during World War I. She went to India as a medical missionary after the war, and worked as a doctor in India from 1922 to 1934, including a stint as surgeon and medical officer at the Duchess of Teck Hospital in Patna. The experience brought her, in time, from her Anglican upbringing to atheism: "I found it hard – finally impossible – to believe in a God of love when I saw the sufferings of the women of India", she explained later.

After retiring to Canada, she was active in various causes, including mental health, women's rights, and peace. She was a public atheist, frequently consulted for positions and quotations by the Canadian press. She helped to found the Victorian Humanist Fellowship in 1956, and as president organized lectures and participated in presentations. In 1968 she was one of the founders of the Humanist Association of Canada. She was named Canadian Humanist of the Year in 1975.

== Personal life ==
In 1928, Marian Noel Bostock married Victor Sherman, a Canadian bank manager she met in India. She became stepmother to Sherman's daughter, Ruth, from a previous marriage. The couple retired to Victoria, British Columbia in 1936. Sherman was widowed in 1960, and died in 1975, aged 83 years, in British Columbia. Her papers are in the British Columbia Archives.
