= Joséphine Marchand =

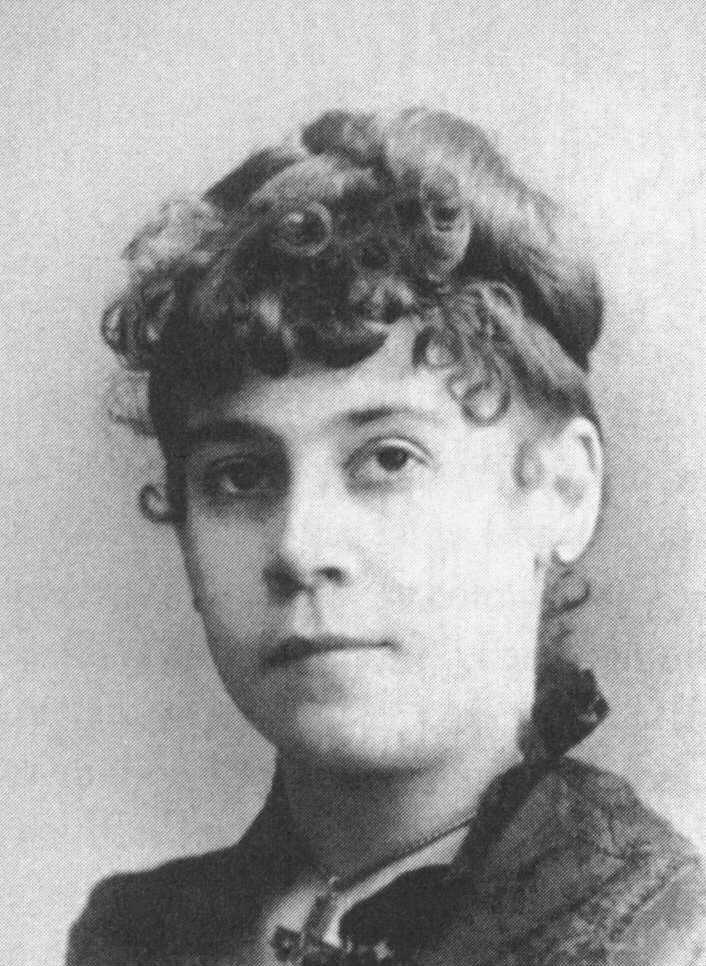
Joséphine Marchand in 1886

Joséphine Marchand-Dandurand (December 5, 1861 – March 2, 1925) was a journalist, writer and feminist activist in Quebec.

== Early years and education ==
Joséphine-Hersélie-Henriette Marchand was born in Saint-Jean-d'Iberville. She was the daughter of Félix-Gabriel Marchand, later Premier of Quebec, and Hersélie Turgeon.

She was educated by the Sisters of the Congregation of Notre Dame of Montreal and developed a love for reading at a young age.

== Career ==
She began to write short stories for publication in 1879. Her work appeared in Le Franco-Canadien, La Patrie and L'Opinion publique. In 1886, she married Raoul Dandurand; the couple had one daughter Gabrielle.

In 1888, her play Quand on s'aime, on se marie, a comedy in one act, appeared at the Académie de Musique de Québec. It was published as Rancune in 1896. In 1889, she published a collection of stories Contes de Noël under the name Josette. She then published two children's plays: Ce que pensent les fleurs (1895) and La carte postale (1896).

She founded the monthly magazine Le Coin du feu in 1893, the first periodical in French edited by a woman; the last issue was published in December 1896. In the last issue, she appealed for growth of women's publications. She continued to contribute to other publications in Montreal such as Le Monde illustré, Journal de Françoise and La Revue moderne. In 1901, she published a collection of her articles as Nos travers.

Marchand was a speaker at the first congress of the National Council of Women of Canada, held in 1894. She served as Quebec vice-president of the Council and as vice-president of its Montreal branch. In 1898, she founded Œuvre des Livres Gratuits, which provided reading material for under-privileged people. In 1902, she became one of the founders of women's section of the Association Saint-Jean-Baptiste de Montréal.

Marchand died in Montreal at the age of 63 after a lengthy illness and was buried in Notre Dame des Neiges Cemetery.

There is a Dandurand-Marchand collection at Library and Archives Canada. A sub-series is dedicated to Joséphine Marchand.
