= Walter Aseltine =

Canadian politician

Walter Aseltine

Walter Morley Aseltine, PC QC (September 3, 1886 in Napanee, Ontario – November 14, 1971) was a Canadian parliamentarian.

A farmer and lawyer by training, Aseltine ran unsuccessfully for a seat in the House of Commons of Canada as the Conservative candidate for Rosetown, Saskatchewan in the 1926 election.

In 1933, he was appointed to the Senate of Canada by R.B. Bennett. He became Government Leader in the Senate in 1958 under John Diefenbaker. He served in that position until 1962.

Aseltine resigned from the Senate in March 1971 at the age of 84 for health reasons. He died eight months later.

The elementary school in Rosetown, Saskatchewan is named "Walter Aseltine School."
