= Alexander Campbell (Canadian senator) =

Canadian Father of Confederation (1822–1892)

The Honourable Sir Alexander Campbell PC KCMG QC
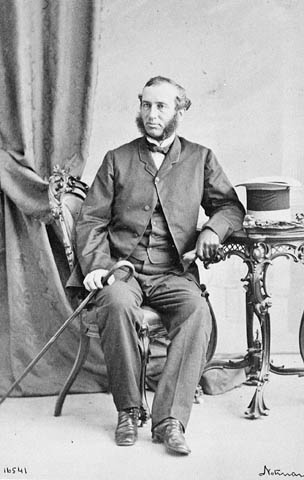

6th Lieutenant Governor of Ontario
- In office June 1, 1887 – May 24, 1892
- Monarch: Victoria
- Governors General: The Marquess of Lansdowne; The Lord Stanley of Preston
- Premier: Oliver Mowat
- Preceded by: John Beverley Robinson
- Succeeded by: George Airey Kirkpatrick

Canadian Senator from Ontario
- In office October 23, 1867 – February 7, 1887

Member of the Legislative Council of the Province of Canada for Cataraqui
- In office 1858–1867

Personal details
- Born: March 9, 1822 Hedon, Yorkshire, England
- Died: May 24, 1892 (aged 70) Toronto, Ontario, Canada
- Resting place: Cataraqui Cemetery, Kingston, Ontario, Canada
- Party: Conservative
- Father of Confederation

Sir Alexander Campbell PC KCMG QC (March 9, 1822 – May 24, 1892) was an Upper Canadian statesman and a father of Canadian Confederation.

== Life ==
Born in Hedon, Yorkshire, he was brought to Canada when he was one year old by his father, James Campbell, who was a doctor. He was educated in French at St. Hyacinthe in Quebec and the grammar school at Kingston, Ontario. Campbell studied law and was called to the bar in 1843. He became a partner in John A. Macdonald's law office.

Campbell was a Freemason of St. John's Lodge, No. 3 (Ontario) of Kingston (now The Ancient St. John's No. 3). When the government was moved to Quebec in 1858, Campbell resigned.

He was elected to the Legislative Council of the Province of Canada in 1858 and 1864, and served as the last Commissioner of Crown Lands 30 March 1864 – 30 June 1867. He attended the Charlottetown Conference and the Quebec City Conference in 1864, and at Confederation was appointed to the Senate of Canada. He later held a number of ministerial posts in the Cabinet of Prime Minister John A. Macdonald and was the sixth Lieutenant Governor of Ontario from 1887 to 1892.

Historian Ged Martin discussed the reasons why Campbell never achieved first rank as a politician; he was lame and suffered from epileptic seizures, and his estranged wife was a certified lunatic (see Family section below).

In 1883, he built his home on Metcalfe Street, Ottawa, now known as "Campbell House".

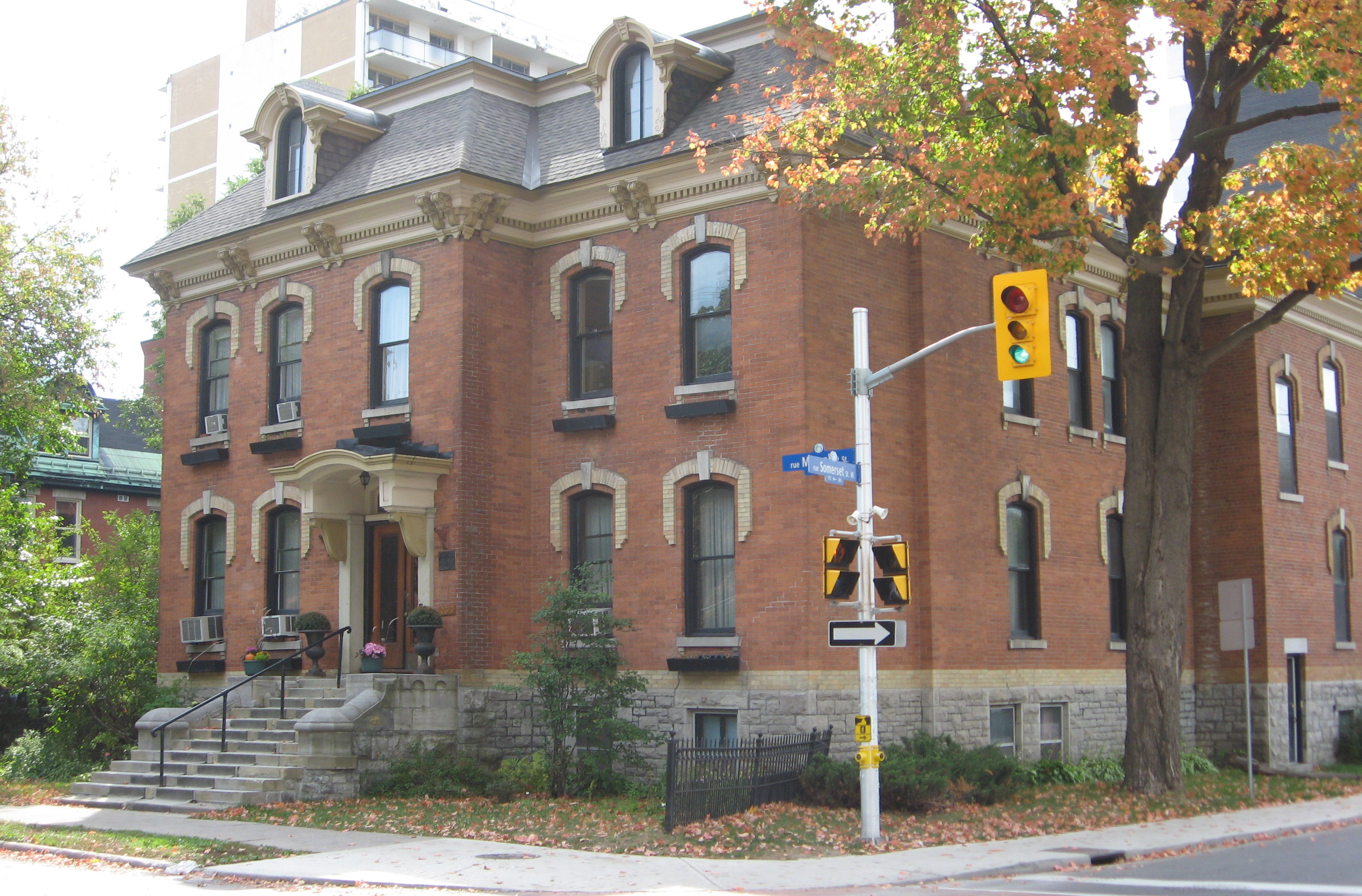
Campbell House, 236 Metcalfe Street, Ottawa

He died in office in Toronto in 1892, and was buried at Cataraqui Cemetery in Kingston, Ontario.

Campbell Crescent in Kingston, a street in the Portsmouth municipal district, is named in his honour.

== Family ==
In 1855, Campbell married Georgina Frederica Locke, daughter of Thomas Sandwith of Beverley, Yorkshire, and a niece of Humphrey Sandwith III (1792–1874) of Bridlington. As Ged Martin has detailed in an article on Campbell's private life, the marriage was a failure and his estranged wife spent time in asylums as a certified lunatic. He left two sons (the eldest was Charles Sandwith Campbell) and three daughters.

Government offices
Preceded by John Beverly Robinson	Lieutenant Governor of Ontario; 1887–1892	Succeeded by George Airey Kirkpatrick
Parliament of Canada
Preceded by office created	Leader of the Government in the Senate of Canada; 1867–1873	Succeeded by Luc Letellier de St-Just
Preceded by Luc Letellier de St-Just	Leader of the Opposition in the Senate of Canada; 1873–1878	Succeeded by Sir Richard William Scott
Preceded by Sir Richard William Scott	Leader of the Government in the Senate of Canada; 1878–1887	Succeeded by John Abbott
