= James Alexander Lougheed =

Canadian politician (1854–1925)

The Honourable Sir James Alexander Lougheed PC KCMG KC
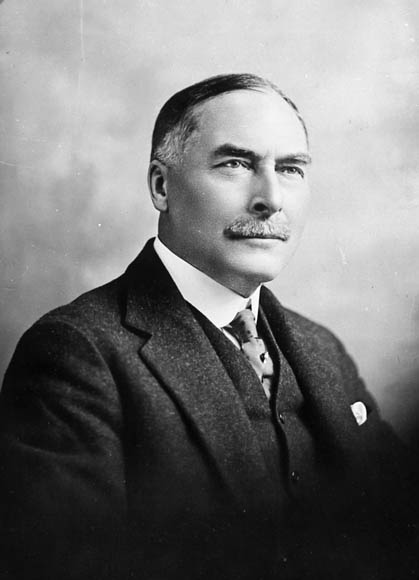

Canadian Senator from North-West Territories (after 1905, Alberta)
- In office 10 December 1889 – 2 November 1925
Additional offices held
Nominated by	John A. Macdonald
Appointed by	Frederick Stanley, 16th Earl of Derby
Preceded by	Richard Hardisty
Succeeded by	Daniel Edward Riley
Minister Without Portfolio
In office 10 October 1911 – 20 February 1918
Minister of Soldiers' Civil Re-establishment
In office 21 February 1918 – 21 September 1921
Preceded by	established
Succeeded by	Robert James Manion
Superintendent-General of Indian Affairs, Minister of the Interior and Minister of Mines
In office 10 July 1920 – 28 December 1921
Preceded by	Arthur Meighen
Succeeded by	Charles Stewart
Representative of the Government in the Senate
In office 10 October 1911 – 28 December 1921
Preceded by	Sir Richard John Cartwright
Succeeded by	Raoul Dandurand
Leader of the Opposition in the Senate
In office 1 April 1906 – 1 January 1911
In office 1, January 1922 – 2 November 1925

Personal details
- Born: 1 September 1854 Tullamore, Chinguacousy, Canada West
- Died: 2 November 1925 (aged 71) Ottawa, Ontario, Canada
- Party: Liberal-Conservative
- Spouse: Isabella Clarke Hardisty (1859–1936)
- Relations: Peter Lougheed, grandson; Samuel Lougheed, brother
- Children: 5
- Education: University of Toronto
- Profession: Politician; lawyer; businessman

Sir James Alexander Lougheed, PC KCMG KC (/ˈlɔːhiːd/ LAW-heed or /lɔːˈhiːd/ law-HEED; 1 September 1854 – 2 November 1925) was a Canadian businessman, lawyer and politician who served as a senator from North-West Territories (later Alberta) from 1889 to 1925. He also served in cabinet positions, including as minister of the interior and minister of mines from 1920 to 1921.

== Early life ==
Lougheed was born in the village of Tullamore, in Chinguacousy Township, Canada West, which is now part of Brampton, Ontario. Tullamore was home to many first-generation, Protestant, Irish-Canadians from the south part of county Sligo. The son of Irish-Protestant parents Mary Ann (Alexander) and John Lougheed, the family moved to Weston (now a community within Toronto, Ontario) when Lougheed was a child, and he attended King Street Public School (now H. J. Alexander Public School) and Weston High School (now Weston Collegiate Institute). He attended the University of Toronto and he studied law at the Osgoode Hall Law School in Toronto and was sworn in as a solicitor in 1881. In 1887 he formed a law practice with Peter McCarthy and two years later in 1889 he became a QC.

In 1882 Lougheed moved with his brother to Winnipeg, Manitoba, and then to Medicine Hat, North-West Territories, following the newly laid Canadian Pacific Railway main line. One year later he moved to Calgary, then at the end of the CPR line.

He started a legal practice in Calgary in the fields of real estate and transportation law, with the CPR as one of his main clients. He also invested heavily in real estate and opened a brokerage firm. His Lougheed Building in downtown Calgary still stands: it included the GRAND theatre which was saved from demolition in 2004 by the Company Theatre Junction The Grand.

In 1884 James Lougheed married Belle Hardisty (1859–1936), daughter of William Hardisty and Mary Anne Allen, of the Chinook people of the Pacific Northwest.

She was a niece of Richard Hardisty (whom James Lougheed replaced in the Senate in 1889) and Donald Smith, 1st Baron Strathcona and Mount Royal. In 1891 they built "Beaulieu" (now Lougheed House), a mansion in what is now the Beltline district of Calgary. Beaulieu became the centre of Calgary's social scene, as the Lougheeds welcomed oil millionaires, politicians, royalty, and entertainment stars to their home. He and Belle had six children, four boys and two girls.

== Political career ==
Lougheed had been a member of the federal Conservative Party since his days in Toronto, and had campaigned for Sir John A. Macdonald. Even so, his appointment to the Senate on 10 December 1889 (replacing Richard Hardisty, his wife's uncle, who had died) came as a surprise to many, as Lougheed was only 35 years old at the time. However, he gained the respect of both his fellow senators and his fellow Westerners due to his staunch support of Western interests and his political abilities. Lougheed spent the next 30 years living both in Ottawa and in Calgary.

In order to protect his legal interests, he brought a young lawyer from New Brunswick named R. B. Bennett — later to become Prime Minister of Canada — to Calgary in 1897. Bennett and Lougheed worked together for over 20 years until an acrimonious dispute between the senator and the future prime minister caused each to go his own way.

In the 1890s Lougheed emerged as the West's strongest voice in the Senate. He was constantly in the position of having to remind members of the Upper Chamber of the realities of life in the western provinces and territories (Alberta at the time being part of the Northwest Territories). He spoke out fiercely against certain provisions in the act creating the province of Alberta, and declared that it would be better to remain a territory than to have what he called archaic education statutes forced on the province.

In 1906, he became Leader of the Opposition in the Senate. The Conservatives were in opposition for many of Lougheed's early years as a senator.

When the Conservatives took power following the 1911 election, he became Leader of the Government in the Senate and minister without portfolio in the government of Sir Robert Borden. He was made Chairman of the Military Hospitals Commission in 1915, and, as a reward for this service, was knighted by George V in 1916 (Order of St Michael and St George), becoming the only Albertan to ever earn the honour.

After Borden formed his wartime Union government, he appointed Lougheed as Minister of Soldiers' Civil Re-establishment in 1918. From 1920 until the Conservative Party's defeat in the 1921 election, Lougheed also served as Minister of Mines, Minister of the Interior and Superintendent-General of Indian Affairs in the government of Prime Minister Arthur Meighen.

With the Liberals in power, Lougheed resumed his position as Leader of the Opposition in the Senate until his death in 1925, aged 71.

Lougheed was a strict conservative in many ways. His relationship to the First Nations people could be both patriarchal and supportive. Generally, he held the virtually ubiquitous Western view that First Nations people were essentially unintelligent children who needed white control in order to survive; this even though his own mother-in-law was from a First Nation. However, when Indian Affairs officials refused to allow the six Nations to participate in the first Calgary Stampede in 1912, Lougheed with R.B. Bennett fought that decision. He adhered to a strict interpretation of the British North America Act, was against women voting, disliked social innovations, and believed Canada's future was as a subordinate nation in the British Empire.

Lougheed was also a successful businessman through his real estate, newspapers, and other ventures in Calgary. He was a staunch advocate of provincial status for what became Alberta and argued that the province rather than the federal government should have control of natural resources. This argument was carried on by his grandson, Peter Lougheed, when he was premier of Alberta in the 1970s and 1980s.

== Death ==
Sir James Lougheed died of pneumonia on 2 November 1925 at the age of 71 in the Ottawa Civic Hospital, and was buried in Union Cemetery in Calgary at the Lougheed family plot on 8 November 1925. Lougheed's funeral at Calgary's Anglican Church was unable to accommodate the number of people who came to pay tributes. James Lougheed and other members of the Lougheed family are buried at Union Cemetery in Calgary.

James Lougheed died only four days after the 1925 Canadian federal election, in which his Conservative Party under Arthur Meighen returned to power with a minority government.

== Legacy ==
- The village of Lougheed, Alberta, Mount Lougheed in the Rocky Mountains, and Lougheed Island in Nunavut are named after him.
- James Lougheed's Calgary home, Lougheed House (Beaulieu), built in 1891, is designated a National Historic Site of Canada, and Alberta Provincial Historic Resource. It has been restored and is now a Heritage Centre in the Beltline district of Calgary.
- Lougheed Block, an Alberta Provincial Historic Resource and Calgary Historic Resource was built by James Lougheed in 1912 in downtown Calgary.
- Sir James Lougheed School, an all-boys elementary school operated by the Calgary Board of Education in southwest Calgary.
- Peter Lougheed, James' grandson, was 10th premier of Alberta, 1971–1985.

Political offices
Preceded by Richard Hardisty	Senator from Alberta; 1889–1925	Succeeded by Daniel Edward Riley
Preceded by Mackenzie Bowell	Leader of the Opposition in the Senate of Canada; 1906–1911	Succeeded by Sir Richard John Cartwright
Preceded by Sir Richard John Cartwright	Leader of the Government in the Senate of Canada; 1911–1921	Succeeded by Raoul Dandurand
Preceded by Hewitt Bostock	Leader of the Opposition in the Senate of Canada; 1921–1925	Succeeded by William Benjamin Ross
