= Raoul Dandurand =

Canadian politician (1861–1942)

The Right Honourable Raoul Dandurand PC KC
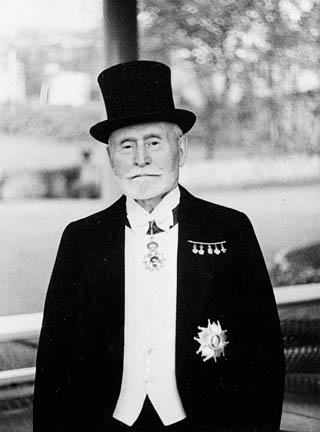

Senator for De Lorimier, Quebec
- In office January 22, 1898 – March 11, 1942
- Appointed by: Wilfrid Laurier
- Preceded by: François Béchard
- Succeeded by: Thomas Vien

Personal details
- Born: November 4, 1861 Montreal, Canada East
- Died: March 11, 1942 (aged 80)
- Resting place: Notre Dame des Neiges Cemetery
- Party: Liberal

Raoul Dandurand PC KC (November 4, 1861 – March 11, 1942) was a Canadian politician and longtime organizer in Quebec for the Liberal Party of Canada.

== Biography ==
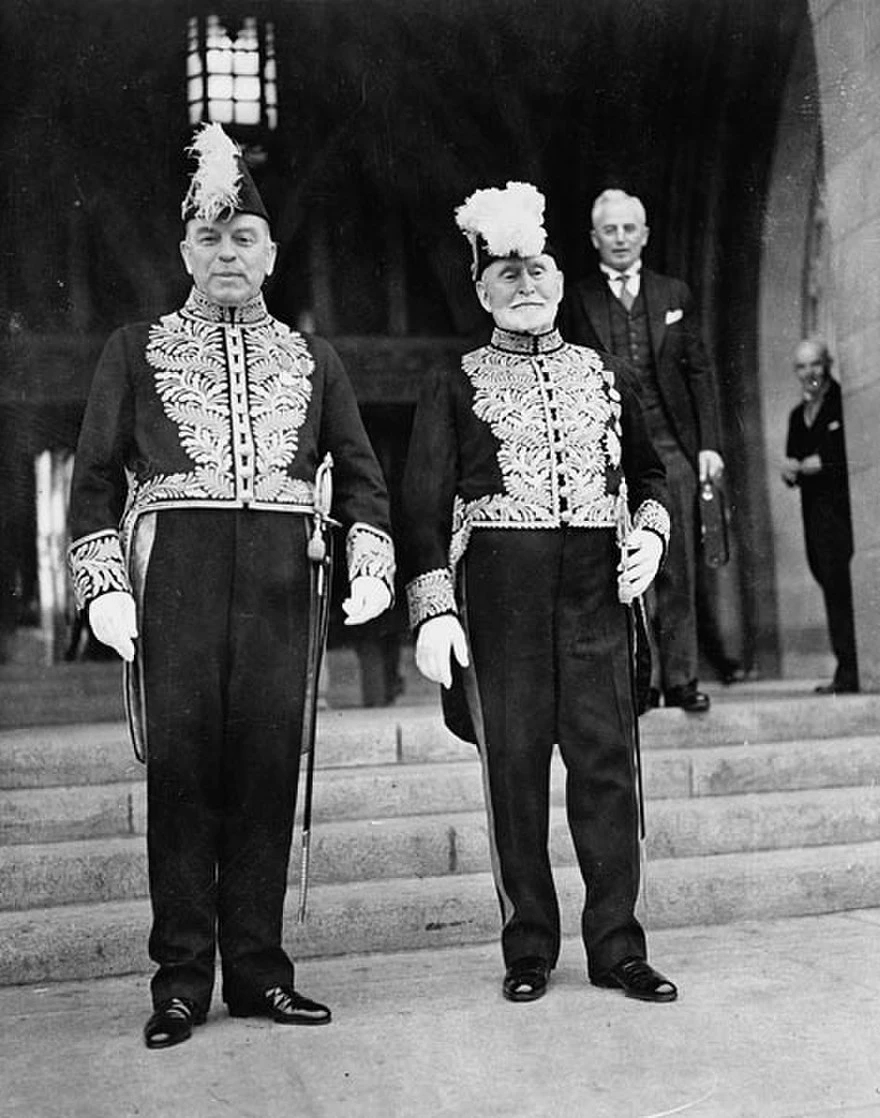
Dandurand and Prime Minister William Lyon Mackenzie King in state clothing, 19 May 1939.

Dandurand graduated from the Faculty of Law at Université Laval in Montreal, and worked as a corporate lawyer in Quebec.

Dandurand, a Montreal lawyer, was appointed to the Senate of Canada in 1898 by Sir Wilfrid Laurier. He served as Speaker of the Senate of Canada from 1905 to 1909 and was either Leader of the Government in the Canadian Senate or Leader of the Opposition in the Canadian Senate from 1921 until 1942. As Government Leader in the Senate he served in every Cabinet formed by William Lyon Mackenzie King from 1921 until Dandurand's death in 1942.

He also served as President of the League of Nations Assembly in 1925 and was Canada's delegate to the League's council from 1927 to 1930. He is perhaps best remembered for having said, in 1927, that in international affairs Canada was “a fireproof house, far from inflammable materials.”

King relied heavily on Dandurand and Ernest Lapointe for advice on Quebec as well as on international affairs and it was Dandurand who suggested Louis St. Laurent for King's Cabinet after Lapointe's death.

After his death, he was entombed at the Notre Dame des Neiges Cemetery in Montreal.

== Family ==
In January 1886, Dandurand married Joséphine Marchand, daughter of Quebec premier and dramatist Hon Félix-Gabriel Marchand and his wife, Marie Herselie Turgeon. Josephine was born in Saint-Jean-d'Iberville, and was educated at the Convent of Les Dames de la Congregation de Notre Dame a branch of Villa-Maria. Her literary works included dramatic pieces, papers and essays on subjects of public interest and in relation to women's duties, rights and place. She founded and edited Le Coin du Feu, a women's paper. They were parents to daughter Gabrielle-Marie-Melinda Dandurand (1886–1933).

She was a member and office-bearer of the National Council of Women of Canada, in which she advanced practical schemes for the promotion of the industrial and fine arts in Canada and the establishment of a Department of Art. She was a member and office-bearer of the Women's Historical Society, the Victorian Order of Nurses. She was President of the Crèche of the Sisters of Mercy, Montreal, Quebec. In 1898, she was created an Officier Academic by the French government. In 1900, she was appointed as a Commissioner from the Canadian government of Canada to the Paris Exposition in Ottawa. In March 1903, she delivered an address before the Alliance française on "La Sociabilite."

== Archives ==
There is a Dandurand-Marchand collection at Library and Archives Canada.

== See also ==
- Université Laval

Parliament of Canada
Preceded by Lawrence Power	Speaker of the Senate of Canada; 1905–1909	Succeeded by James Kerr
Government offices
Preceded by Hewitt Bostock	Leader of the Opposition in the Senate of Canada; 1919	Succeeded by Hewitt Bostock
Preceded by Sir James Alexander Lougheed	Leader of the Government in the Senate of Canada; 1921–1926	Succeeded by William Benjamin Ross
Preceded by William Benjamin Ross	Leader of the Opposition in the Senate of Canada; 1926	Succeeded by William Benjamin Ross
Preceded by William Benjamin Ross	Leader of the Government in the Senate of Canada; 1926–1930	Succeeded by Wellington Bartley Willoughby
Preceded by Wellington Willoughby	Leader of the Opposition in the Senate of Canada; 1930–1935	Succeeded by Arthur Meighen
Preceded by Arthur Meighen	Leader of the Government in the Senate of Canada; 1935–1942	Succeeded by James Horace King
