= Hewitt Bostock =

Canadian politician (1864–1930)

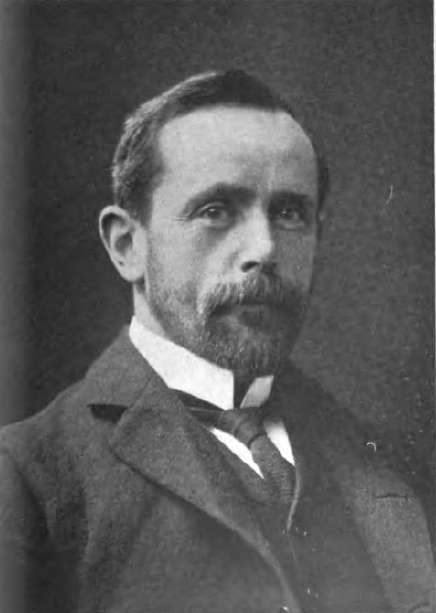
The Hon. Hewitt Bostock, c.1914

Hewitt Bostock, PC (May 31, 1864 – April 28, 1930) was a Canadian publisher, businessman and politician.

== Early life ==
He was born in Walton Heath, Epsom, England and studied at Trinity College, Cambridge graduating with honours in mathematics. Bostock then studied law and was called to the bar in 1888. Rather than begin a legal practice he toured North America, Australia, New Zealand, China and Japan before settling in British Columbia in 1893. He purchased the Monte Creek Ranch (also known as the Ducks Ranch) in 1888, taking up residence there in 1894. In addition to the ranch, he also operated a lumber company.

== Career ==
He founded the Province newspaper in 1894. He then entered politics winning election to the House of Commons of Canada as a Liberal in the 1896 election, representing the riding of Yale—Cariboo for one term (until the 1900 election).

In 1904, he was appointed to the Senate of Canada by the prime minister, Wilfrid Laurier. A decade later he became Leader of the Opposition in the Canadian Senate. Bostock broke with the Laurier Liberals over the Conscription Crisis of 1917, and became a Liberal-Unionist, campaigning in favour of the Union government of Sir Robert Borden during the 1917 election.

Following World War I, Bostock reconciled with the Liberals and, in 1921, became Minister of Public Works in the Liberal government of William Lyon Mackenzie King. Several months later, in 1922, he became Speaker of the Senate of Canada and held the position until his death in 1930. In 1925, he served as a member of the Canadian delegation to the Assembly of the League of Nations.

There is a Mount Hewitt Bostock (2183 m or 7162 ft) named in his honour in the northern end of the Canadian Cascades, about 20 kilometres northeast of the Fraser Canyon town of Boston Bar, which is in what had been the riding of Yale—Cariboo where his political career began (today in Chilliwack—Fraser Canyon).

His eldest daughter Marian Noel Sherman was a physician in India and a prominent humanist in western Canada.

Parliament of Canada
Preceded by The electoral district was created in 1892.	Member of Parliament for Yale—Cariboo; 1896–1900	Succeeded by William Alfred Galliher
Political offices
Preceded by George William Ross	Leader of the Opposition in the Senate of Canada; 1914–1919	Succeeded by Raoul Dandurand
Preceded by Raoul Dandurand	Leader of the Opposition in the Senate of Canada; 1920–1921	Succeeded by James Alexander Lougheed
