= Jack Austin (politician) =

Canadian politician (born 1932)

The Honourable Jack Austin PC CM OBC
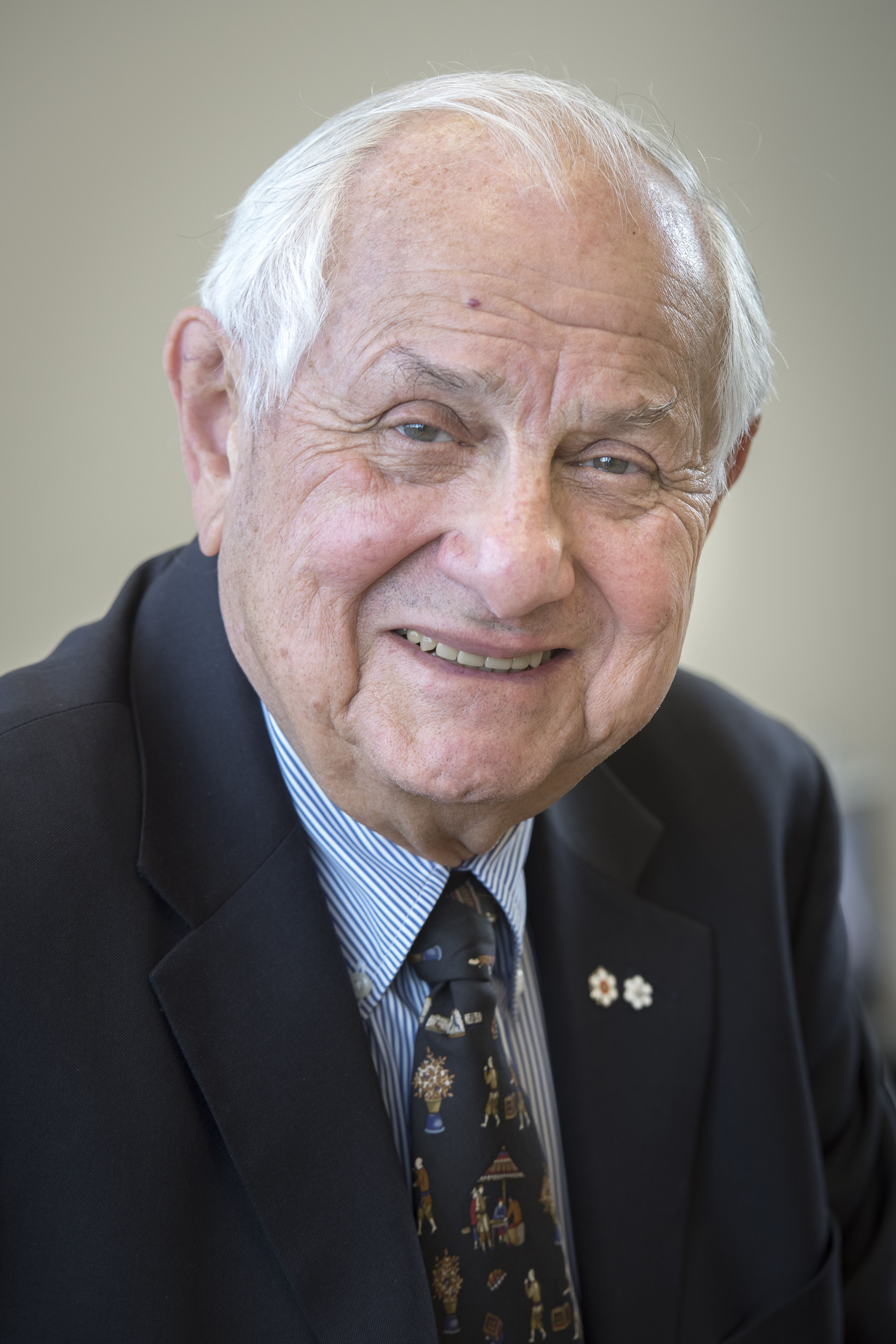
- Austin in 2017

Leader of the Government in the Senate
- In office December 12, 2003 – February 5, 2006
- Prime Minister: Paul Martin
- Deputy: Fernand Robichaud; Bill Rompkey
- Whip: Bill Rompkey; Rose-Marie Losier-Cool
- Preceded by: Sharon Carstairs
- Succeeded by: Marjory LeBreton

Minister of State for Social Development
- In office September 10, 1982 – June 29, 1984
- Prime Minister: Pierre Trudeau
- Minister: Lloyd Axworthy; John Roberts
- Preceded by: Jean Chrétien
- Succeeded by: Judy Erola

Minister of State (Without Portfolio)
- In office September 22, 1981 – September 9, 1982
- Prime Minister: Pierre Trudeau
- Preceded by: Bryce Mackasey (1974)
- Succeeded by: Roch La Salle (1984)

Principal Secretary to the Prime Minister
- In office May 4, 1974 – August 18, 1975
- Prime Minister: Pierre Trudeau
- Preceded by: Martin O'Connell
- Succeeded by: Jim Coutts
Parliamentary constituencies
Canadian Senator from British Columbia
In office August 19, 1975 – March 2, 2007
Nominated by	Pierre Trudeau
Appointed by	Jules Léger
Preceded by	Arthur Laing
Succeeded by	Multi-member district

Personal details
- Born: Jacob Austin; March 2, 1932 (age 94) Calgary, Alberta, Canada
- Party: Liberal
- Profession: Lawyer

OBC ribbon

Jacob Austin PC CM OBC (born March 2, 1932) is a former Canadian politician and former member of the Senate of Canada. He was appointed to the upper house by Prime Minister Pierre Trudeau on August 8, 1975 and represented British Columbia. At the time of his retirement he was the longest-serving senator.

== Life and career ==
Austin was born in Calgary, Alberta to Morris Austin and Clara Austin (nee Chetner). His family had a small corner store, the North Star Grocery, at 940 2nd Ave NW, in the Sunnyside neighbourhood. Austin grew up working in the store while attending Crescent Heights High School.

Prior to entering the Senate, Austin had careers as a lawyer, businessman and as a senior civil servant. He graduated from the University of British Columbia (BA, LLB) and Harvard Law School (LLM). In the late 1950s and early 1960s, Austin was a legal partner of Nathan Nemetz, who later served as chief justice of the British Columbia Court of Appeal. Nemetz recruited Austin to join the Liberal Party.

Austin's political career began in 1963 when he served as executive assistant to Arthur Laing while he was Minister of Northern Affairs and National Resources. While he was in Ottawa, Paul Martin Sr. asked him to serve on the legal team that negotiated the Columbia River Treaty on behalf of the government.

Austin's only attempt to win an election was as the Liberal candidate in Vancouver Kingsway in the 1965 federal election, at which time it was an open seat. He came second to Grace MacInnis, who held the constituency on behalf of the New Democratic Party. After his defeat, Austin practiced commercial law in Vancouver and then pursued business interests in the mining sector.

In 1970, he was appointed deputy minister of Energy, Mines and Resources and was part of the first Canadian trade mission sent to the People's Republic of China.

In 1974, Prime Minister Pierre Trudeau appointed Austin to be his chief of staff. In 1975, on Trudeau's recommendation, Governor General Jules Léger appointed him to the Senate, representing British Columbia. During Pierre Trudeau's final mandate as prime minister, Austin served as a Minister of State in the cabinet from 1981 to 1982 and then as Minister of State for Social Development until Trudeau's retirement in 1984. As Minister of State for Social Development, he chaired the cabinet's social development committee and was a member of the cabinet's priorities and planning committee. He returned to the Cabinet of Canada in 2003 when Prime Minister Paul Martin appointed him Leader of the Government in the Senate, in which capacity he served until the Liberal defeat in the 2006 election. He took mandatory retirement from the Senate on March 2, 2007, his seventy-fifth birthday.

Austin played key roles in the development of Petro-Canada, the Asia-Pacific Foundation of Canada and the Canada Investment Development Corporation, as well as in ensuring the success of Expo 86 in Vancouver: he secured the federal government's construction of Canada Place, which served as the Canadian pavilion during Expo and is now a convention centre and cruise ship terminal.

In 1980-81, Austin served as Liberal whip on the special joint committee on the Constitution, where he advocated for the inclusion of a Charter of Rights and the entrenchment of Aboriginal rights.

Throughout his career, Austin maintained an interest in China and involvement in relations between the two countries. From 1993 to 2000, he was president of the Canada China Business Council, and was a key organizer of the 1994 Team Canada trade mission to China led by Prime Minister Jean Chrétien, which included nine premiers, two territorial leaders and about 350 business executives. After Austin’s retirement from the Senate, he was appointed honorary professor and senior fellow at the University’s of British Columbia’s Institute of Asian Research.

He also worked to advance Canada-Mexico relations, and was the inaugural Canadian co-convenor of the North American Institute (NAMI), a non-governmental organization founded in 1988 that brought together academics and government figures from Canada, the United States and Mexico. In the early 1990s, he was a participant in the Canada-Mexico Business Retreat, a group of mainly business figures.

Austin received the Order of the Aztec Eagle from the Government of Mexico in 2000. He was inducted into the Order of British Columbia in 2010 and into the Order of Canada in 2015. He received honorary doctorates from the University of East Asia (now University of Macao), the University of British Columbia, Royal Roads University and Simon Fraser University.

He married Natalie Veiner Freeman in 1978 and has three daughters – Edith, Sharon and Barbara – from a previous marriage.

In 2023, his memoir Unlikely Insider: A West Coast Advocate in Ottawa, co-written with his daughter Edith (Edie), was published by McGill-Queen’s University Press.

27th Canadian Ministry (2003–2006) – Cabinet of Paul Martin
Cabinet post (1)
Predecessor	Office	Successor
Sharon Carstairs	Leader of the Government in the Senate; 2003–2006	Marjory LeBreton
22nd Canadian Ministry (1980–1984) – Second cabinet of Pierre Trudeau
Cabinet post (1)
Predecessor	Office	Successor
	Minister of State for Social Development; 1982–1984	
