= William Benjamin Ross =

Canadian politician

The Right Hon. William Benjamin K. C. Ross

Senator for De Lorimier, Quebec
- In office January 20, 1912 – February 10, 1929
- Appointed by: Wilfrid Laurier
- Preceded by: François Béchard
- Succeeded by: James Alexander Lougheed

Personal details
- Born: December 2, 1855 Charlottetown, Prince Edward Island, British North America
- Died: January 10, 1929 (aged 73)

William Benjamin K.C. Ross (December 12, 1855 – January 10, 1929) was a Canadian politician, lawyer and businessman.

A lawyer by training, Ross practised law in Halifax, Nova Scotia. He also pursued business interests such as helping found the Halifax Electric Tramway Company Limited. Ross was appointed to the Senate of Canada as a Conservative in 1912 by Sir Robert Borden.

In January 1926, he was appointed Leader of the Opposition in the Canadian Senate by Tory leader Arthur Meighen, and served briefly as Government Leader in the Canadian Senate when Meighen formed a short-lived government later that year. After the Conservatives lost the 1926 election, Ross resumed his position as Opposition Leader. Ross remained in that position until his death in 1929.

Government offices
Preceded by James Alexander Lougheed	Leader of the Opposition in the Senate of Canada; 1926	Succeeded by Raoul Dandurand
Preceded by Raoul Dandurand	Leader of the Opposition in the Senate of Canada; 1926–1929	Succeeded by Wellington Willoughby
