= Edward Joseph Thériault =

Canadian politician

Senator for Nova Scotia, Nova Scotia division
- In office 20 April 1968 – 20 December 1968

Personal details
- Born: Edward Joseph Thériault; 10 May 1901 Hartford, Connecticut, United States
- Died: 20 December 1968 (aged 67) Digby, Nova Scotia, Canada
- Party: Liberal
- Profession: lawyer

Edward Joseph Thériault (10 May 1901 – 20 December 1968) was a Liberal party member of the Senate of Canada.

He was born in Hartford, Connecticut, the son of Jean Joseph and Marie Agnes (Belliveau) Thériault. He graduated from Dalhousie Law School in 1927. He was a lawyer by trade.

He was appointed to the Senate for the Nova Scotia division on 20 April 1968 following nomination by Prime Minister Pierre Trudeau. Thériault remained a Senator until his death on 20 December 1968.
