= Richard Hardisty =

Canadian politician (1831–1889)

The Honourable Richard Hardisty
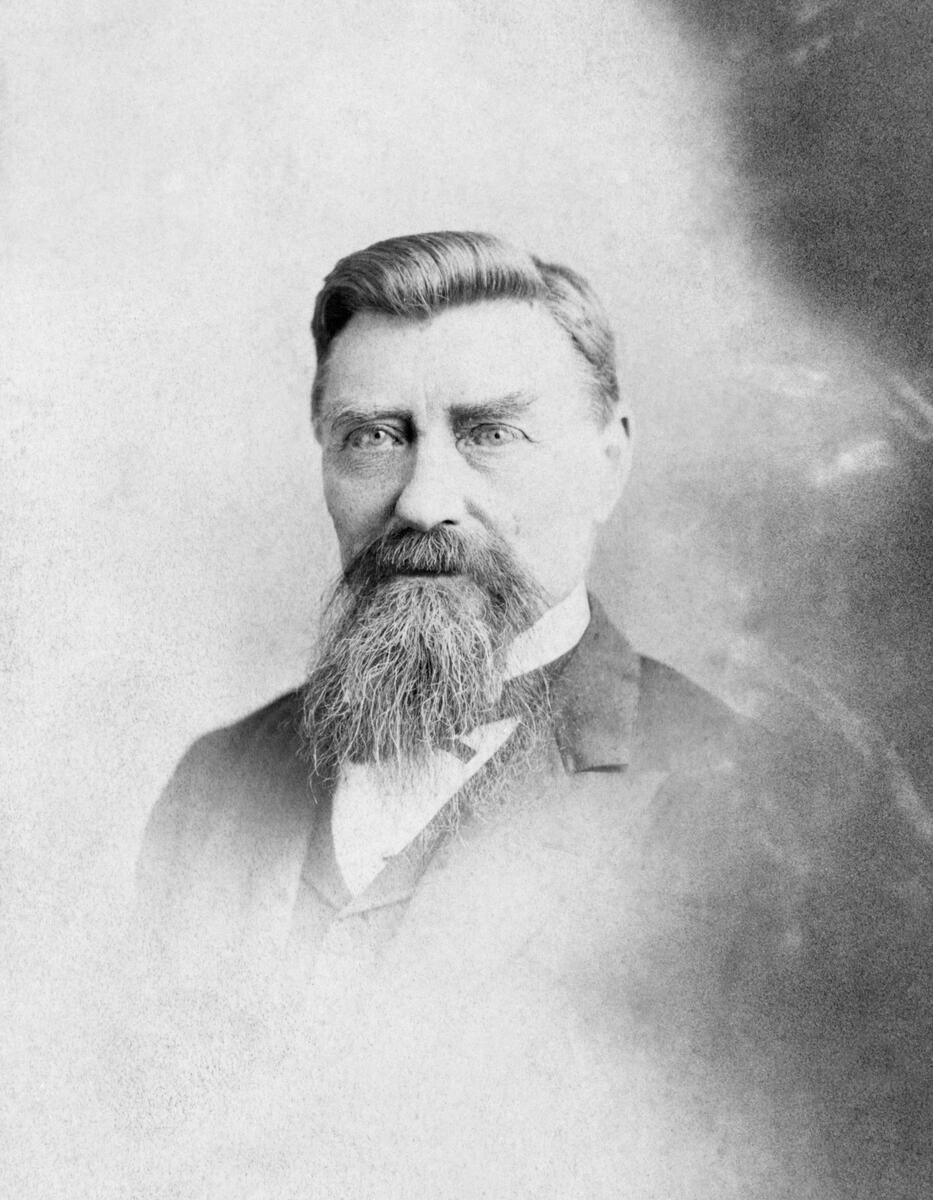

Canadian Senator from Alberta
- In office 23 February 1888 – 15 October 1889
- Nominated by: John A. Macdonald
- Appointed by: Henry Petty-Fitzmaurice
- Preceded by: Position established
- Succeeded by: James Alexander Lougheed

Personal details
- Born: Richard Charles Hardisty; 2 March 1831 Fort Mistassini, Rupert's Land
- Died: 15 October 1889 (aged 58) Winnipeg, Manitoba, Canada
- Spouse: Eliza McDougall (m. 1866)
- Children: 3

Richard Charles Hardisty (3 March 1831 – 15 October 1889) was a Canadian politician. He was a Hudson's Bay Company official in Edmonton, and a member of the Senate of Canada for the North-West Territories.

== His life ==
Richard Hardisty’s father was a Hudson’s Bay Company chief trader, born in London, England. His mother, Margaret Sutherland, was of First Nations and Scottish heritage.

He married Eliza McDougall, daughter of George Millward McDougall, on 21 September 1866 while he was a Hudson's Bay Company employee. They had three children, including Clara Victoria Hardisty (later Mrs. John Graham).

in the 1887 Canadian federal election he ran as an Independent Conservative in Alberta (Provisional District). He finished a close second to Donald Watson Davis.

He was appointed to the Senate of Canada on the advice of Prime Minister John A. Macdonald on 23 February 1888, becoming the first Métis senator.

He died a year later on 15 October 1889, two weeks after being thrown from a horse-drawn buggy on 2 October. (His replacement in the Senate was Sir James Lougheed, who was married to Richard Hardisty's niece Isabella (Belle) Hardisty. James Lougheed was the grandfather of Peter Lougheed, premier of Alberta from 1971 to 1985.)

The village of Hardisty, Alberta, is named in his honour, as is Mount Hardisty in Jasper National Park.

Parliament of Canada
Preceded by New position	Senator Northwest Territories; 1888-1889	Succeeded by James Alexander Lougheed
