= Conservative Party of Canada (1867) =

Centre-right political party in Canada

Conservative Party of Canada Parti conservateur du Canada
- Founded: July 1, 1867 (159 years, 137 days)
- Dissolved: December 10, 1942 (83 years, 340 days)
- Merger of: Parti bleu Upper Canada Tories
- Succeeded by: Progressive Conservative Party of Canada
- Ideology: Conservatism; Expansionism; Protectionism; British imperialism
- Political position: Right-wing
- Colours: Blue

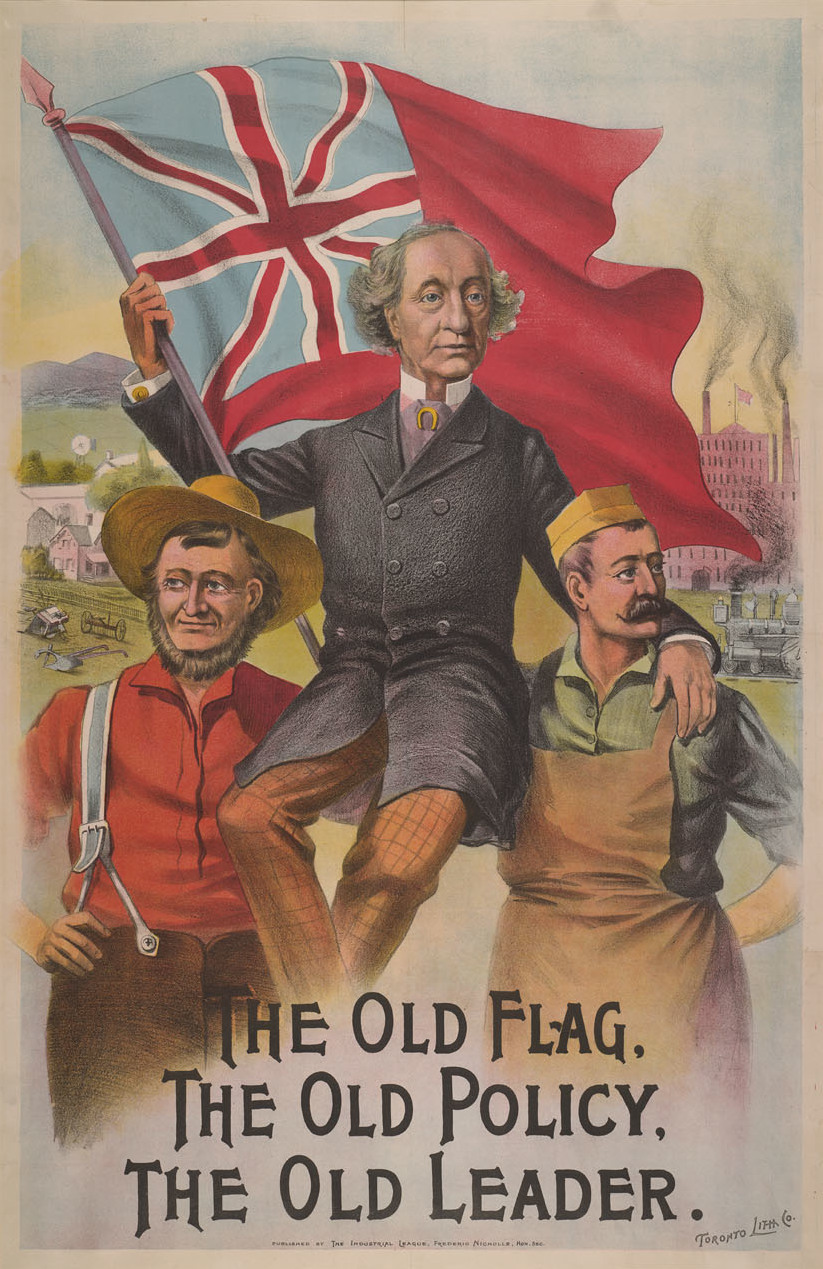
1891 election poster promoting prime minister John A. Macdonald

The Conservative Party of Canada (French: Parti conservateur du Canada) was a major federal political party in Canada that existed under that name from 1867 before being renamed the Progressive Conservative Party in 1942. The party adhered to traditionalist conservatism and its main policies included strengthening relations with Great Britain, nationalizing industries, and promoting high tariffs.

The party was founded in the aftermath of Canadian Confederation and was known as the "Liberal-Conservative Party" until it dropped "Liberal" from its name in 1873. Primarily under the leadership of John A. Macdonald, the Conservatives governed Canada from 1867 to 1873 and from 1878 to 1896. During these two periods of governance, the party strengthened ties with Great Britain, oversaw the construction of the Canadian Pacific Railway, significantly expanded Canada's territorial boundaries, and introduced the National Policy of high tariffs to protect domestic industries.

During its third period of governance from 1911 to 1921, the Conservative Party introduced the income tax and women's suffrage for federal elections, and most notably oversaw Canada's involvement in World War I. In 1917, the party introduced conscription, triggering a national divide known as the Conscription Crisis. As a result of the crisis, the party joined with pro-conscription Liberals to become the "Unionist Party", which existed until 1920. The Conservatives were defeated in the 1921 election.

The Conservatives briefly formed government in 1926 and from 1930 to 1935. During the latter period, the Conservatives were faced with the Great Depression, although the party was widely unpopular for its handling of it, leading to their defeat in 1935. In 1942, the Conservatives attempted to broaden their base by electing Manitoba Progressive Premier John Bracken as their new leader at that year's leadership convention. Bracken agreed to become the party's leader on the condition that it change its name to the "Progressive Conservative Party of Canada".

== Origins ==
=== Liberal-Conservative Party ===
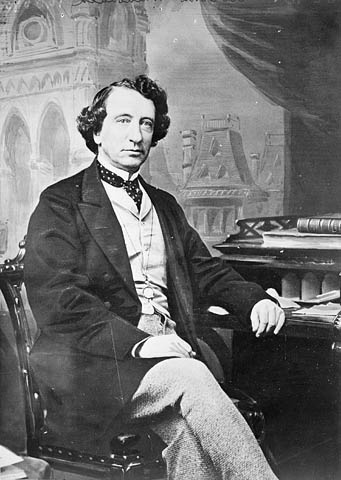
John A. Macdonald

The roots of the party are in the pre-Confederation Province of Canada. In 1853, the bleus from Canada East and the Tories and moderate reformers from Canada West joined together in a coalition government under the dual premiership of Allan MacNab and A.-N. Morin. It was out of this coalition that the Liberal-Conservative Party was formed.

== Confederation ==
Macdonald became the leader of the Conservative Party and formed the first national government in 1867. The party brought together ultramontane Quebec Catholics, pro-tariff businessmen, United Empire Loyalists, and Orangemen. One major accomplishment of Macdonald's first government was the creation of the Canadian Pacific Railway which also led to the Pacific Scandal that brought down the government in 1873.

The Liberal-Conservatives under Macdonald returned to power in 1878 by opposing the policy of free trade or reciprocity with the United States and promoting, instead, the National Policy which sought to promote business and develop industry with high tariff protectionist measures as well as settle and develop the west.

The principal difference between the Conservatives and the Liberals in this period and well into the twentieth century was that Conservatives were in favour of imperial preference (a protectionist system in which tariffs would be levied against imports from outside the British Empire) and strong political and legal links with Britain while Liberals promoted free trade and continentalism (that is closer ties to the United States) and greater independence from Britain. Macdonald died in 1891 and, without his leadership, the Conservative coalition began to unravel under the pressure of sectarian tensions between Catholic French Canadians and British imperialists who tended to be anti-French and anti-Catholic. The government's mis-handling of the grievances that aroused both the Red River Rebellion and the North-West Rebellion, the hanging of the rebellion's leader Louis Riel, and the Manitoba Schools Question, all exacerbated tensions within the Conservative Party and suppressed much of the support for the Conservatives among Quebecois.

However, free trade between Canada and the U.S. became the major issue of the 1911 election. Wilfrid Laurier's Liberals, in favour of increased trade with the U.S., were subsequently swept from power. Robert Borden led a new Tory administration that emphasized a revitalized National Policy and continued strong links to Britain. Borden had built a base in Quebec by allying with anti-Laurier Quebec nationalists, but, in government, tensions between Quebec nationalists and English Canadian imperialists made any grand coalition untenable.

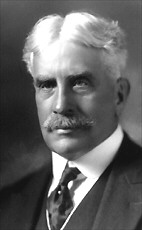
Robert Borden

== Borden and the Conservative revival ==
World War I created a further strain as most Quebecers (plus pacifists and many workers, farmers and socialists across the country, especially immigrants) were unenthusiastic about Canadian involvement in what they saw as a foreign, and particularly British, conflict, while Borden's supporters, most living in English Canada, supported Canada's war effort and its policy of conscription of men for the war (see Conscription Crisis of 1917).

== National Liberal and Conservative Party ==
The attempt to turn the Conservatives into a hegemonic party by merging with Liberal-Unionists failed as most Liberals either joined the new Progressive Party of Canada or rejoined the Liberals under its new leader William Lyon Mackenzie King. One critical issue in this split was free trade - farmers were particularly hostile to Tory tariff policy and free trade was a key issue in the creation of the Progressives while the Conscription Crisis destroyed any remaining Conservative base in Quebec for generations, leaving them with even less support than they had before the Union government.

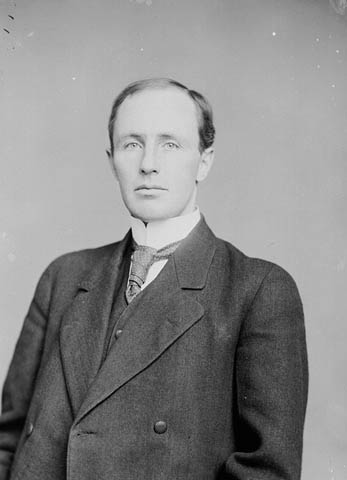
Arthur Meighen

Borden's successor, Arthur Meighen formally attempted to make the Unionist coalition permanent by creating the "National Liberal and Conservative Party" but most Liberals ended up returning to their old party and some Conservatives balked at what they saw as an attempt to destroy the Conservative Party. John Hampden Burnham, MP for Peterborough West, quit the government caucus to sit as an Independent Conservative and resigned his seat in order to contest it in a by-election on his position.

Meighen's party was defeated by the Liberals in the election of 1921 coming in third behind the Progressives. At March 1922 caucus meeting the party voted to revert to its original name of the Liberal-Conservative Party.

The Liberals were reduced to a minority government in the 1925 election. The Conservatives won a plurality of seats in the House of Commons, but King was able to stay in power with the support of the Progressives and form a minority government. King's government was defeated in a vote in the House of Commons within months and Prime Minister King asked Governor General Byng to call a new election, but Byng refused and asked Meighen to form a government.

Meighen's government was defeated three days after taking office by a vote in the Commons, leaving no choice but a new election. The general election produced a Liberal victory. Wiseman argues that Liberals emphasized Canadian nationalism while Conservatives "exuded British imperialist pride". The "King–Byng Affair" played primarily to Canadian nationalist sentiment because it was felt the Governor General, a British government appointee, had overstepped his bounds and that this was a sign of excessive British influence in Canadian politics. The political impact of the King–Byng Affair therefore favoured the Liberals.

== Bennett and the Great Depression ==
Meighen was replaced as Tory leader by R. B. Bennett, a millionaire Calgary businessman at the 1927 leadership convention, the first time a Tory leader was chosen by this method. Bennett led the Conservatives to power in the 1930 election, largely as a result of the inability of the Liberal government (or any government in the western world) to deal with the Great Depression. Bennett promised to end the economic crisis in three days by implementing the old Conservative policy of high tariffs and imperial preference.

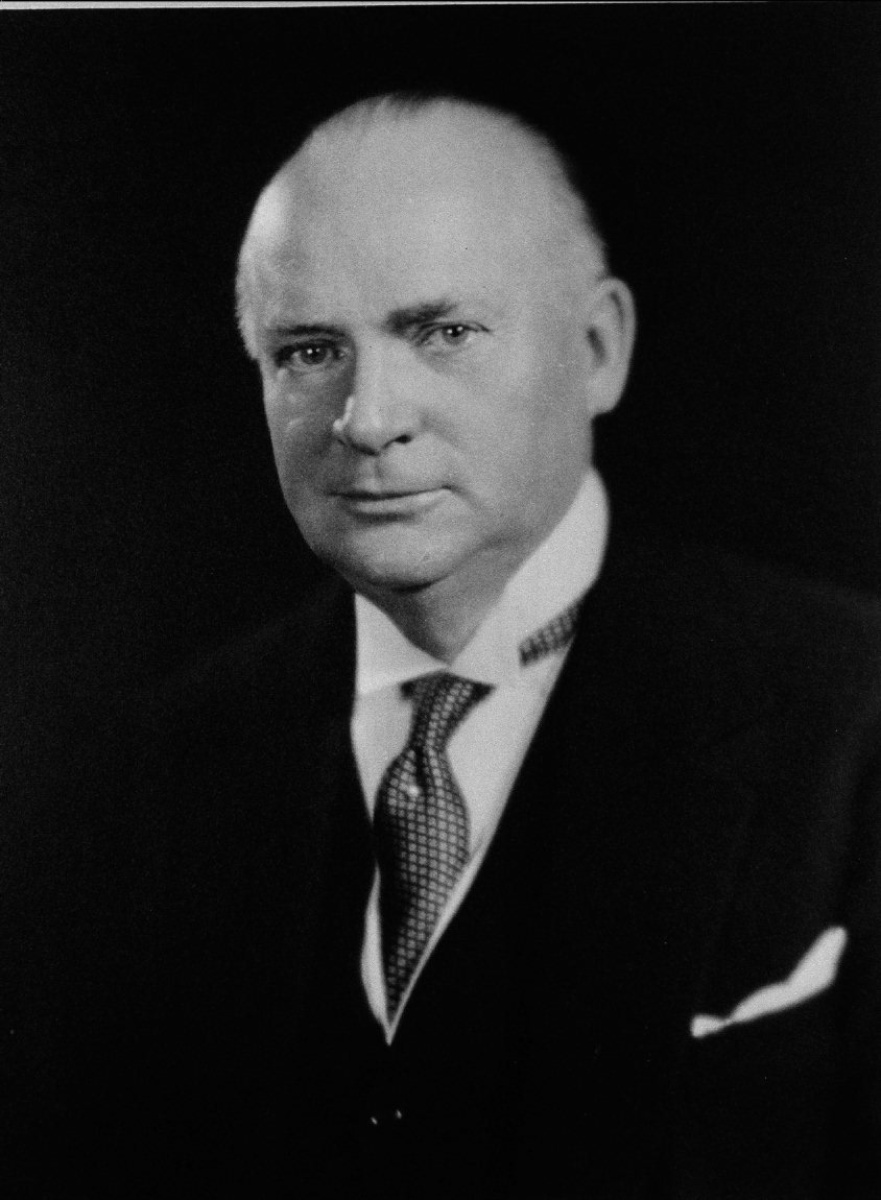
Richard Bedford Bennett

When this policy failed to generate the desired result Bennett's government had no alternative plan. The party's pro-business, pro-bank inclinations provided no relief to the millions of unemployed who were now becoming increasingly desperate and agitated. The Conservatives seemed indecisive and unable to cope and rapidly lost the confidence of Canadians becoming a focus of hatred, ridicule and contempt. Car owners who could no longer afford gasoline reverted to having their vehicles pulled by horses and dubbed them "Bennett buggies".

R. B. Bennett faced pressure for radical reforms from within and without the party:

- The Co-operative Commonwealth Federation (CCF), formed in 1932, prepared to fight its first election on a socialist program. The Social Credit movement was gaining supporters in the west and shocked the country by winning the Alberta provincial election and forming government in September, 1935. Bennett's own government suffered a defection as his Trade minister, Henry Herbert Stevens, left the Conservatives to form the Reconstruction Party of Canada when Bennett refused to enact Stevens' plans for drastic economic reform and government intervention in the economy to deal with the crisis.

Bennett attempted to prevent social disorder by evacuating the unemployed to relief camps far away from the cities but this only exacerbated social tensions leading to the "On-to-Ottawa Trek" of unemployed protesters who intended to ride the rails from Vancouver to Ottawa (gathering new members along the way) in order to bring their demands for relief to Bennett personally. The trek ended in Regina on July 1, 1935, when the Royal Canadian Mounted Police, on orders from the Prime Minister, attacked a public meeting of 3,000 strikers leaving two dead and dozens injured.

In desperation, Bennett had attempted to save his government by reversing its laissez-faire policies and, belatedly, implementing "Bennett's New Deal" based on the New Deal of Franklin Delano Roosevelt. Bennett proposed progressive income taxation, a minimum wage, a maximum for work week hours, unemployment insurance, health insurance, an expanded pension program, and grants to farmers. The Conservatives' conversion to the concept of a welfare state came too late, and the Conservatives were routed in the October 1935 election, winning only 40 seats to 173 for Mackenzie King's Liberals.

The Bennett years left the Conservatives in poor shape – not only did dissatisfaction towards the Conservatives continue in Quebec as a legacy of the Conscription Crisis of 1917, but they were now reviled in the West for their perceived insensitivity to the needs of farmers in the Dust Bowl and Westerners turned to Social Credit or the CCF making the Conservatives their fourth choice. The Conservatives would have to wait twenty years before their fortunes in Western Canada revived.

== National Government label ==
Bennett's successor, Robert Manion, was chosen at the 1938 leadership convention which also officially changed the name of the party from the Liberal-Conservative Party to the National Conservative Party. The Conservatives fought the 1940 election under Manion with a different name, "National Government".

With the election taking place during World War II, the party ran on a platform of forming a wartime national unity government. Manion proposed to have Liberal and Labour supporters of the coalition concept run as "National Government" candidates nominated through open riding conventions in which members of any party would be allowed to vote. The concept did not pan out and, in practice, the National Government candidates were all Conservatives. Despite the new name, the party failed to gain any seats, and Manion was personally defeated in his riding.

The idea for running under a "National Government" platform was likely inspired by the Union Government which the Conservatives formed during World War I in coalition with some dissident Liberals.

== Decline and reinvention as Progressive Conservatives ==
After Manion's defeat, the Conservatives again turned to Arthur Meighen for leadership. Senator Meighen was appointed the party's leader for the duration of the war in November 1941 by a unanimous vote at a national conference of several hundred party delegates after a motion to hold a leadership convention was defeated. He resigned from the Senate and attempted to enter the House of Commons from a safe Conservative seat but was trounced by the CCF in a February 1942 by-election in York South. His party's agitation for a re-enactment of conscription in World War II only further alienated Quebec from the Conservatives. Meighen resigned as leader following his defeat.

Later that year, the Conservatives attempted to broaden their base by electing Manitoba Progressive Premier John Bracken as their new leader at the 1942 leadership convention. Bracken agreed to become the party's leader on the condition that it change its name to the "Progressive Conservative Party of Canada".

== National Conservative leaders (1867–1942) ==
Name	From	To	Riding as leader	Notes
Sir John A. Macdonald	July 1, 1867	June 6, 1891	Kingston, ON (1867–18, 1887–91); Victoria, BC (1878–82); Carleton, ON (1882–88)	1st Prime Minister
Sir John Abbott	June 16, 1891	November 24, 1892	Senator for Inkerman, QC	3rd Prime Minister
Sir John Sparrow David Thompson	December 5, 1892	December 12, 1894	Antigonish, NS	4th Prime Minister
Sir Mackenzie Bowell	December 21, 1894	April 27, 1896	Senator for Hastings, ON	5th Prime Minister
Sir Charles Tupper	May 1, 1896	February 6, 1901	Cape Breton, NS	6th Prime Minister
Sir Robert Laird Borden	February 6, 1901	July 10, 1920	Halifax, NS (1900–04, 1908–17); Carleton, ON (1905–08); Kings, NS (1917–21)	8th Prime Minister
Arthur Meighen	July 10, 1920	September 24, 1926	Portage la Prairie, MB (1908–21, 1925–26); Grenville, ON (1922–25)	9th Prime Minister
Hugh Guthrie (interim leader)	October 11, 1926	October 12, 1927	Wellington South	
R. B. Bennett	October 12, 1927	July 7, 1938	Calgary West, AB	11th Prime Minister
Robert Manion	July 7, 1938	May 14, 1940	London, ON	Resigned after lost seat in 1940 election
Richard Hanson (interim leader)	May 14, 1940	November 12, 1941	York—Sunbury, NB	
Arthur Meighen	November 12, 1941	December 9, 1942	Senator for St. Marys, Ontario	Resigned after defeat in attempt to enter House of Commons via York South by-election

=== Conservative leaders in the Senate ===
Name	From	To	Position	Notes
Alexander Campbell	July 1, 1867	January 26, 1887	Government Leader. Opposition Leader from November 5, 1873, to October 7, 1878	
Sir John Joseph Caldwell Abbott	May 12, 1887	October 30, 1893	Government Leader	also Prime Minister from June 16, 1891, to November 24, 1892
Sir Mackenzie Bowell	October 31, 1893	March 1, 1906	Government Leader	also Prime Minister from December 21, 1894, to April 27, 1896
Sir Mackenzie Bowell	October 31, 1893	March 1, 1906	Opposition Leader	
Sir James Alexander Lougheed	April 1, 1906	November 2, 1925	Opposition Leader, Government Leader from October 10, 1911, to December 28, 1921	Unionist Party from 1917 to 1920
William Benjamin Ross	January 1, 1926	January 10, 1929	Opposition Leader. Government Leader from June 28 to September 24, 1926	
Wellington Bartley Willoughby	January 11, 1929	February 3, 1932	Opposition Leader. Government Leader from August 7, 1930	
Arthur Meighen	February 3, 1932	January 16, 1942	Government Leader until October 22, 1935. Opposition leader until 1942	Former prime minister (1920-1921, 1926). Also National Conservative Leader (2nd time) from November 13, 1941
Charles Colquhoun Ballantyne	January 16, 1942	December 10, 1942	Opposition Leader	Became Senate Leader when Meighen resigned to run for a seat in the House of Commons. Conservative Party became Progressive Conservative Party of Canada as of December 11, 1942. Ballantyne served as first Progressive Conservative Senate leader until 1945.

== Election results 1867–1940 ==
View source data.

Election	Leader	Party name	# of candidates nominated	# of seats won	+/–	Election Outcome	# of total votes	% of popular vote	Position
1867	John A. Macdonald	Conservatives, Liberal-Conservatives	112	100 / 180	▲100	▲1st	92,656	34.53%	Majority
1872	John A. Macdonald	Conservatives, Liberal-Conservatives, one Conservative Labour	140	100 / 200	Steady	1st	123,100	38.66%	Minority
1874	John A. Macdonald	Conservatives, Liberal-Conservatives, one Conservative Labour	104	65 / 206	▼35	▼2nd	99,440	30.58%	Opposition
1878	John A. Macdonald	Conservatives, Liberal-Conservatives	161	129 / 206	▲64	▲1st	229,191	42.06%	Majority
1882	John A. Macdonald	Conservatives, Liberal-Conservatives	168	136 / 215	▲7	1st	208,544	40.39%	Majority
1887	John A. Macdonald	Conservatives, Liberal-Conservatives	203	111 / 215	▼25	1st	343,805	47.41%	Majority
1891	John A. Macdonald	Conservatives, Liberal-Conservatives	212	117 / 215	▲6	1st	376,518	48.58%	Majority
1896	Charles Tupper	Conservatives, Liberal-Conservatives	207	98 / 213	▼19	▼2nd	467,415	48.17%	Opposition
1900	Charles Tupper	Conservatives, Liberal-Conservatives	204	79 / 213	▼9	2nd	438,330	46.1%	Opposition
1904	Robert Borden	Conservatives, Liberal-Conservatives	205	75 / 214	▼4	2nd	470,430	45.94%	Opposition
1908	Robert Borden	Conservatives, Liberal-Conservatives	211	85 / 221	▲10	2nd	539,374	46.21%	Opposition
1911	Robert Borden	Conservatives, Liberal-Conservatives and Nationalist Conservatives	212	132 / 221	▲48	▲1st	636,938	48.90%	Majority
1917	Robert Borden	Unionist Party	211	152 / 235	▲20	1st	1,070,694	56.93%	Majority
1921	Arthur Meighen	National Liberal and Conservative Party	204	49 / 235	▼103	▼3rd	935,651	29.95%	Third Party
1925	Arthur Meighen	Conservatives	232	114 / 245	▲65	▲1st	1,454,253	46.13%	Opposition
1925	Arthur Meighen	Conservatives	232	114 / 245	▲65	▲1st	1,454,253	46.13%	Minority
1926	Arthur Meighen	Conservatives	232	91 / 245	▼23	▼2nd	1,476,834	45.34%	Opposition
1930	R. B. Bennett	Conservatives	229	137 / 245	▲46	▲1st	1,836,115	47.79%	Majority
1935	R. B. Bennett	Conservatives	228	39 / 245	▼98	▼2nd	1,290,671	29.84%	Opposition
1940	Robert James Manion	National Government	207	39 / 245	Steady	2nd	1,402,059	30.41%	Opposition

== See also ==
- Conservative leadership conventions
- Conscription Crisis of 1944
- List of Canadian federal general elections
- List of political parties in Canada
- Official Opposition (Canada)
- Prime Minister of Canada
- List of Canadian Tory leaders and Tory Prime Ministers
