= List of senators in the 33rd Parliament of Canada =

This is a list of members of the Senate of Canada in the 33rd Parliament of Canada.

The province of Quebec has 24 Senate divisions which are constitutionally mandated. In all other provinces, a Senate division is strictly an optional designation of the senator's own choosing, and has no real constitutional or legal standing. A senator who does not choose a special senate division is designated a senator for the province at large.

Names in bold indicate senators in the 24th Canadian Ministry.

== List of senators ==
=== Senators at the beginning of the 33rd Parliament ===
Name	Party	Province (Division)	Date appointed	Appointed by	Left office	Reason
Willie Adams	Liberal	Northwest Territories	April 5, 1977	Trudeau	June 22, 2009	Retirement
Margaret Jean Anderson	Liberal	New Brunswick	March 23, 1978	Trudeau	August 7, 1990	Retirement
Hazen Argue	Liberal	Saskatchewan	February 24, 1966	Pearson	October 2, 1991	Death
Martial Asselin	Progressive Conservative	Quebec	September 1, 1972	Trudeau	August 7, 1990	Resignation
Jack Austin	Liberal	British Columbia	August 19, 1975	Trudeau	March 2, 2007	Retirement
James Balfour	Progressive Conservative	Saskatchewan	September 13, 1979	Clark	December 12, 1999	Death
Irvine Barrow	Liberal	Nova Scotia	May 8, 1974	Trudeau	February 15, 1988	Retirement
Louis-Philippe Beaubien	Progressive Conservative	Quebec	November 16, 1960	Diefenbaker	March 28, 1985	Death
Rhéal Bélisle	Progressive Conservative	Ontario	February 4, 1963	Diefenbaker	November 3, 1992	Death
Nancy Bell	Independent	British Columbia	October 7, 1970	Trudeau	November 29, 1989	Death
William Moore Benidickson	Liberal	Ontario	July 7, 1965	Pearson	January 4, 1985	Death
Martha Bielish	Progressive Conservative	Alberta	September 27, 1979	Clark	September 26, 1990	Resignation
Lorne Bonnell	Liberal	Prince Edward Island	November 4, 1971	Trudeau	January 4, 1998	Retirement
Peter Bosa	Liberal	Ontario	April 5, 1977	Trudeau	December 10, 1998	Death
Sidney Buckwold	Liberal	Saskatchewan	November 4, 1971	Trudeau	November 3, 1991	Retirement
Donald Cameron	Independent Liberal	Alberta	July 28, 1955	St. Laurent	September 19, 1987	Resignation
Guy Charbonneau	Progressive Conservative	Quebec	September 27, 1979	Clark	June 21, 1997	Retirement
Anne Cools	Liberal	Ontario	January 13, 1984	Trudeau	August 12, 2018	Retirement
Eymard Corbin	Liberal	New Brunswick	July 9, 1984	Turner	August 2, 2009	Retirement
Ernest G. Cottreau	Liberal	Nova Scotia	May 8, 1974	Trudeau	January 28, 1989	Retirement
David Croll	Liberal	Ontario	July 28, 1955	St. Laurent	June 11, 1991	Death
Keith Davey	Liberal	Ontario	February 24, 1966	Pearson	July 1, 1996	Resignation
Pierre de Bané	Liberal	Quebec	June 29, 1984	Trudeau	August 2, 2013	Retirement
Azellus Denis	Liberal	Quebec	February 3, 1964	Pearson	September 4, 1991	Death
Jean-Paul Deschatelets	Liberal	Quebec	February 24, 1966	Pearson	January 10, 1986	Resignation
Richard Donahoe	Progressive Conservative	Nova Scotia	September 13, 1979	Clark	September 27, 1984	Retirement
C. William Doody	Progressive Conservative	Newfoundland and Labrador	October 3, 1979	Clark	December 27, 2005	Death
Douglas Everett	Liberal	Manitoba	November 8, 1966	Pearson	January 20, 1994	Resignation
Joyce Fairbairn	Liberal	Alberta	June 29, 1984	Trudeau	January 18, 2013	Resignation
Jacques Flynn	Progressive Conservative	Quebec	November 9, 1962	Diefenbaker	August 22, 1990	Resignation
Royce Frith	Liberal	Ontario	April 5, 1977	Trudeau	August 29, 1994	Resignation
Philippe Gigantès	Liberal	Quebec	January 13, 1984	Trudeau	August 16, 1998	Retirement
Louis Giguère	Liberal	Quebec	September 10, 1968	Trudeau	December 18, 1986	Retirement
John Morrow Godfrey	Liberal	Ontario	October 5, 1973	Trudeau	June 28, 1987	Retirement
Jerry Grafstein	Liberal	Ontario	January 13, 1984	Trudeau	January 2, 2010	Retirement
Alasdair Graham	Liberal	Nova Scotia	April 27, 1972	Trudeau	May 21, 2004	Retirement
Joseph-Philippe Guay	Liberal	Manitoba	March 23, 1978	Trudeau	October 4, 1990	Retirement
Stanley Haidasz	Liberal	Ontario	March 23, 1978	Trudeau	March 4, 1998	Retirement
Earl Hastings	Liberal	Alberta	February 24, 1966	Pearson	May 5, 1996	Death
Dan Hays	Liberal	Alberta	June 29, 1984	Trudeau	June 30, 2007	Resignation
Jacques Hébert	Liberal	Quebec	April 20, 1983	Trudeau	June 21, 1998	Retirement
Henry Hicks	Liberal	Nova Scotia	April 27, 1972	Trudeau	March 5, 1990	Retirement
Florence Elsie Inman	Liberal	Prince Edward Island	July 28, 1955	St. Laurent	May 31, 1986	Death
William McDonough Kelly	Progressive Conservative	Ontario	December 23, 1982	Trudeau	July 21, 2000	Retirement
Colin Kenny	Liberal	Ontario	June 29, 1984	Trudeau	February 2, 2018	Resignation
Michael J. L. Kirby	Liberal	Nova Scotia	January 13, 1984	Trudeau	October 31, 2006	Resignation
Leo Kolber	Liberal	Quebec	December 23, 1983	Trudeau	January 18, 2004	Retirement
Paul Lafond	Liberal	Quebec	October 7, 1970	Trudeau	May 27, 1988	Death
Daniel Lang	Independent	Ontario	February 14, 1964	Pearson	June 13, 1994	Resignation
Léopold Langlois	Liberal	Quebec	July 8, 1966	Pearson	October 2, 1988	Retirement
Renaude Lapointe	Liberal	Quebec	November 10, 1971	Trudeau	January 3, 1987	Retirement
Edward M. Lawson	Independent	British Columbia	October 7, 1970	Trudeau	September 24, 2004	Retirement
Jean Le Moyne	Liberal	Quebec	December 23, 1982	Trudeau	February 17, 1988	Retirement
Fernand Leblanc	Liberal	Quebec	March 27, 1979	Trudeau	July 1, 1992	Retirement
Roméo LeBlanc	Liberal	New Brunswick	June 29, 1984	Trudeau	November 21, 1994	Resignation
Thomas Lefebvre	Liberal	Quebec	July 9, 1984	Turner	November 20, 1992	Death
Philip Lewis	Liberal	Newfoundland and Labrador	March 23, 1978	Trudeau	November 28, 1999	Retirement
Paul Lucier	Liberal	Yukon	October 23, 1975	Trudeau	July 23, 1999	Death
John Michael Macdonald	Progressive Conservative	Nova Scotia	June 24, 1960	Diefenbaker	June 20, 1997	Death
Allan MacEachen	Liberal	Nova Scotia	June 29, 1984	Trudeau	July 6, 1996	Retirement
Heath MacQuarrie	Progressive Conservative	Prince Edward Island	October 3, 1979	Clark	September 18, 1994	Retirement
Leonard Marchand	Liberal	British Columbia	June 29, 1984	Trudeau	March 1, 1998	Resignation
Lorna Marsden	Liberal	Ontario	January 24, 1984	Trudeau	August 31, 1992	Resignation
Jack Marshall	Progressive Conservative	Newfoundland and Labrador	March 23, 1978	Trudeau	November 26, 1994	Retirement
Charles McElman	Liberal	New Brunswick	February 24, 1966	Pearson	April 1, 1990	Resignation
Frederic McGrand	Liberal	New Brunswick	July 28, 1955	St. Laurent	January 22, 1988	Resignation
Gildas Molgat	Liberal	Manitoba	October 7, 1970	Trudeau	February 28, 2001	Death
Hartland Molson	Independent	Quebec	July 28, 1955	St. Laurent	May 31, 1993	Resignation
Robert Muir	Progressive Conservative	Nova Scotia	March 26, 1979	Trudeau	November 10, 1994	Retirement
**Lowell Murray**	**Progressive Conservative**	**Ontario**	**September 13, 1979**	**Clark**	**September 26, 2011**	**Retirement**
Joan Neiman	Liberal	Ontario	September 1, 1972	Trudeau	September 9, 1995	Retirement
Nathan Nurgitz	Progressive Conservative	Manitoba	October 3, 1979	Clark	February 9, 1993	Resignation
Bud Olson	Liberal	Alberta	April 5, 1977	Trudeau	March 7, 1996	Resignation
Ray Perrault	Liberal	British Columbia	October 5, 1973	Trudeau	February 6, 2001	Retirement
William Petten	Liberal	Newfoundland and Labrador	April 8, 1968	Pearson	January 28, 1998	Retirement
Orville Howard Phillips	Progressive Conservative	Prince Edward Island	February 5, 1963	Diefenbaker	March 24, 1999	Resignation
Michael Pitfield	Independent	Ontario	December 22, 1982	Trudeau	June 1, 2010	Resignation
Maurice Riel	Liberal	Quebec	October 5, 1973	Trudeau	April 3, 1997	Retirement
Daniel Aloysius Riley	Liberal	New Brunswick	December 21, 1973	Trudeau	September 13, 1984	Death
Pietro Rizzuto	Liberal	Quebec	December 23, 1976	Trudeau	August 3, 1997	Death
Louis Robichaud	Liberal	New Brunswick	December 21, 1973	Trudeau	October 21, 2000	Retirement
**Dufferin Roblin**	**Progressive Conservative**	**Manitoba**	**March 23, 1978**	**Trudeau**	**June 17, 1992**	**Retirement**
Yvette Boucher Rousseau	Liberal	Quebec	March 27, 1979	Trudeau	March 17, 1988	Death
Frederick William Rowe	Liberal	Newfoundland and Labrador	December 9, 1971	Trudeau	September 28, 1987	Retirement
Cyril Sherwood	Progressive Conservative	New Brunswick	October 3, 1979	Clark	July 1, 1990	Retirement
Ian David Sinclair	Liberal	Ontario	December 23, 1983	Trudeau	September 27, 1988	Retirement
Herbert O. Sparrow	Liberal	Saskatchewan	February 9, 1968	Pearson	January 4, 2005	Retirement
Richard Stanbury	Liberal	Ontario	February 13, 1968	Pearson	May 2, 1998	Retirement
David Steuart	Liberal	Saskatchewan	December 9, 1976	Trudeau	January 26, 1991	Retirement
John Benjamin Stewart	Liberal	Nova Scotia	January 13, 1984	Trudeau	November 19, 1999	Retirement
Peter Stollery	Liberal	Ontario	July 2, 1981	Trudeau	November 29, 2010	Retirement
Joseph Albert Sullivan	Progressive Conservative	Ontario	October 12, 1957	Diefenbaker	February 18, 1985	Resignation
Norbert Thériault	Liberal	New Brunswick	March 26, 1979	Trudeau	February 16, 1996	Retirement
Andy Thompson	Liberal	Ontario	April 6, 1967	Pearson	March 23, 1998	Resignation
Arthur Tremblay	Progressive Conservative	Quebec	September 27, 1979	Clark	June 18, 1992	Retirement
Charles Turner	Liberal	Ontario	July 9, 1984	Turner	March 24, 1991	Retirement
George Van Roggen	Liberal	British Columbia	November 4, 1971	Trudeau	June 8, 1992	Death
David James Walker	Progressive Conservative	Ontario	February 4, 1963	Diefenbaker	September 30, 1989	Resignation
Charlie Watt	Liberal	Quebec	January 16, 1984	Trudeau	March 16, 2018	Resignation
Dalia Wood	Liberal	Quebec	March 26, 1979	Trudeau	January 31, 1999	Resignation
Paul Yuzyk	Progressive Conservative	Manitoba	February 4, 1963	Diefenbaker	July 9, 1986	Death

=== Senators appointed during the 33rd Parliament ===
Name	Party	Province (Division)	Date appointed	Appointed by	Left office	Reason
Finlay MacDonald	Progressive Conservative	Nova Scotia	December 21, 1984	Mulroney	January 4, 1998	Retirement
Staff Barootes	Progressive Conservative	Saskatchewan	December 21, 1984	Mulroney	May 25, 1993	Resignation
Brenda Robertson	Progressive Conservative	New Brunswick	December 21, 1984	Mulroney	May 23, 2004	Retirement
Richard Doyle	Progressive Conservative	Ontario	March 19, 1985	Mulroney	March 10, 1998	Retirement
Paul David	Progressive Conservative	Quebec	April 16, 1985	Mulroney	December 25, 1994	Retirement
Jean-Maurice Simard	Progressive Conservative	New Brunswick	June 26, 1985	Mulroney	June 16, 2001	Death
Michel Cogger	Progressive Conservative	Quebec	May 2, 1986	Mulroney	September 1, 2000	Resignation
Norman Atkins	Progressive Conservative	Ontario	June 30, 1986	Mulroney	June 27, 2009	Retirement
Eileen Rossiter	Progressive Conservative	Prince Edward Island	November 17, 1986	Mulroney	July 14, 2004	Retirement
Mira Spivak	Progressive Conservative	Manitoba	November 17, 1986	Mulroney	July 12, 2009	Retirement
Ethel Cochrane	Progressive Conservative	Newfoundland and Labrador	November 17, 1986	Mulroney	September 23, 2012	Retirement
Jean Bazin	Progressive Conservative	Quebec	December 29, 1986	Mulroney	December 8, 1989	Resignation
Gerry Ottenheimer	Progressive Conservative	Newfoundland and Labrador	December 30, 1987	Mulroney	January 18, 1998	Death
Gérald Beaudoin	Progressive Conservative	Quebec	September 26, 1988	Mulroney	April 15, 2004	Retirement
Jean-Marie Poitras	Progressive Conservative	Quebec	September 26, 1988	Mulroney	May 25, 1993	Resignation
Roch Bolduc	Progressive Conservative	Quebec	September 26, 1988	Mulroney	September 10, 2003	Retirement
Solange Chaput-Rolland	Progressive Conservative	Quebec	September 26, 1988	Mulroney	May 14, 1994	Retirement

=== Left Senate during the 33rd Parliament ===
Date	Name	Party	Representing	Details
September 13, 1984	Daniel Aloysius Riley	Liberal	New Brunswick	Death
September 27, 1984	Richard Donahoe	Progressive Conservative	Nova Scotia	Retirement
January 4, 1985	William Moore Benidickson	Liberal	Ontario	Death
February 18, 1985	Joseph Albert Sullivan	Progressive Conservative	Ontario	Resignation
March 28, 1985	Louis-Philippe Beaubien	Progressive Conservative	Quebec	Death
January 10, 1986	Jean-Paul Deschatelets	Liberal	Quebec	Resignation
May 31, 1986	Florence Elsie Inman	Liberal	Prince Edward Island	Death
July 9, 1986	Paul Yuzyk	Progressive Conservative	Manitoba	Death
December 18, 1986	Louis Giguère	Liberal	Quebec	Retirement
January 3, 1987	Renaude Lapointe	Liberal	Quebec	Retirement
June 28, 1987	John Morrow Godfrey	Liberal	Ontario	Retirement
September 19, 1987	Donald Cameron	Independent Liberal	Alberta	Resignation
September 28, 1987	Frederick William Rowe	Liberal	Newfoundland and Labrador	Retirement
January 22, 1988	Frederic McGrand	Liberal	New Brunswick	Resignation
February 15, 1988	Irvine Barrow	Liberal	Nova Scotia	Retirement
February 17, 1988	Jean Le Moyne	Liberal	Quebec	Retirement
March 17, 1988	Yvette Boucher Rousseau	Liberal	Quebec	Death
May 27, 1988	Paul Lafond	Liberal	Quebec	Death
September 27, 1988	Ian David Sinclair	Liberal	Ontario	Retirement
October 2, 1988	Léopold Langlois	Liberal	Quebec	Retirement

=== Changes in party affiliation during the 33rd Parliament ===
Date	Name	Party (subsequent)	Party (previous)	Details
March 15, 1988	Jean-Maurice Simard	Independent Progressive Conservative	Progressive Conservative	
July 1, 1988	Jean-Maurice Simard	Progressive Conservative	Independent Progressive Conservative	

== See also ==
- List of current Canadian senators
