= List of senators in the 31st Parliament of Canada =

This is a list of members of the Senate of Canada in the 31st Parliament of Canada.

The province of Quebec has 24 Senate divisions which are constitutionally mandated. In all other provinces, a Senate division is strictly an optional designation of the senator's own choosing, and has no real constitutional or legal standing. A senator who does not choose a special senate division is designated a senator for the province at large.

Names in bold indicate senators in the 21st Canadian Ministry.

== List of senators ==
=== Senators at the beginning of the 31st Parliament ===
Name	Party	Province (Division)	Date appointed	Appointed by	Left office	Reason
Willie Adams	Liberal	Northwest Territories	April 5, 1977	Trudeau	June 22, 2009	Retirement
Margaret Jean Anderson	Liberal	New Brunswick	March 23, 1978	Trudeau	August 7, 1990	Retirement
Hazen Argue	Liberal	Saskatchewan	February 24, 1966	Pearson	October 2, 1991	Death
**Martial Asselin**	**Progressive Conservative**	**Quebec**	**September 1, 1972**	**Trudeau**	**August 7, 1990**	**Resignation**
Jack Austin	Liberal	British Columbia	August 19, 1975	Trudeau	March 2, 2007	Retirement
Irvine Barrow	Liberal	Nova Scotia	May 8, 1974	Trudeau	February 15, 1988	Retirement
Louis-Philippe Beaubien	Progressive Conservative	Quebec	November 16, 1960	Diefenbaker	March 28, 1985	Death
Rhéal Bélisle	Progressive Conservative	Ontario	February 4, 1963	Diefenbaker	November 3, 1992	Death
Nancy Bell	Liberal	British Columbia	October 7, 1970	Trudeau	November 29, 1989	Death
William Moore Benidickson	Liberal	Ontario	July 7, 1965	Pearson	January 4, 1985	Death
Florence Bird	Liberal	Ontario	March 23, 1978	Trudeau	January 15, 1983	Retirement
Lorne Bonnell	Liberal	Prince Edward Island	November 4, 1971	Trudeau	January 4, 1998	Retirement
Peter Bosa	Liberal	Ontario	April 5, 1977	Trudeau	December 10, 1998	Death
Sidney Buckwold	Liberal	Saskatchewan	November 4, 1971	Trudeau	November 3, 1991	Retirement
Donald Cameron	Independent Liberal	Alberta	July 28, 1955	St. Laurent	September 19, 1987	Resignation
Lionel Choquette	Progressive Conservative	Ontario	January 31, 1958	Diefenbaker	March 6, 1981	Resignation
John Joseph Connolly	Liberal	Ontario	June 12, 1953	St. Laurent	October 31, 1981	Resignation
Eric Cook	Liberal	Newfoundland and Labrador	February 14, 1964	Pearson	July 26, 1984	Resignation
Ernest G. Cottreau	Liberal	Nova Scotia	May 8, 1974	Trudeau	January 28, 1989	Retirement
David Croll	Liberal	Ontario	July 28, 1955	St. Laurent	June 11, 1991	Death
Keith Davey	Liberal	Ontario	February 24, 1966	Pearson	July 1, 1996	Resignation
Azellus Denis	Liberal	Quebec	February 3, 1964	Pearson	September 4, 1991	Death
Jean-Paul Deschatelets	Liberal	Quebec	February 24, 1966	Pearson	January 10, 1986	Resignation
Paul Desruisseaux	Liberal	Quebec	July 8, 1966	Pearson	May 1, 1980	Retirement
Raymond Eudes	Liberal	Quebec	April 8, 1968	Pearson	October 25, 1980	Death
Douglas Everett	Liberal	Manitoba	November 8, 1966	Pearson	January 20, 1994	Resignation
**Jacques Flynn**	**Progressive Conservative**	**Quebec**	**November 9, 1962**	**Diefenbaker**	**August 22, 1990**	**Resignation**
Eugene Forsey	Liberal	Ontario	October 7, 1970	Trudeau	May 29, 1979	Retirement
Edgar Fournier	Progressive Conservative	New Brunswick	September 24, 1962	Diefenbaker	February 11, 1983	Resignation
J. Michel Fournier	Liberal	New Brunswick	December 9, 1971	Trudeau	September 29, 1980	Retirement
Sarto Fournier	Liberal	Quebec	June 12, 1953	St. Laurent	July 23, 1980	Death
Royce Frith	Liberal	Ontario	April 5, 1977	Trudeau	August 29, 1994	Resignation
Louis Giguère	Liberal	Quebec	September 10, 1968	Trudeau	December 18, 1986	Retirement
John Morrow Godfrey	Liberal	Ontario	October 5, 1973	Trudeau	June 28, 1987	Retirement
Carl Goldenberg	Liberal	Quebec	November 4, 1971	Trudeau	October 20, 1982	Retirement
Alasdair Graham	Liberal	Nova Scotia	April 27, 1972	Trudeau	May 21, 2004	Retirement
Allister Grosart	Progressive Conservative	Ontario	September 24, 1962	Diefenbaker	December 13, 1981	Resignation
Joseph-Philippe Guay	Liberal	Manitoba	March 23, 1978	Trudeau	October 4, 1990	Retirement
Stanley Haidasz	Liberal	Ontario	March 23, 1978	Trudeau	March 4, 1998	Retirement
Earl Hastings	Liberal	Alberta	February 24, 1966	Pearson	May 5, 1996	Death
Salter Hayden	Liberal	Ontario	February 9, 1940	King	November 1, 1983	Resignation
Harry Hays	Liberal	Alberta	February 24, 1966	Pearson	May 4, 1982	Death
Henry Hicks	Liberal	Nova Scotia	April 27, 1972	Trudeau	March 5, 1990	Retirement
Florence Elsie Inman	Liberal	Prince Edward Island	July 28, 1955	St. Laurent	May 31, 1986	Death
Paul Lafond	Liberal	Quebec	October 7, 1970	Trudeau	May 27, 1988	Death
John Keith McBroom Laird	Liberal	Ontario	April 6, 1967	Pearson	January 12, 1982	Retirement
Maurice Lamontagne	Liberal	Quebec	April 6, 1967	Pearson	June 12, 1983	Death
Daniel Lang	Liberal	Ontario	February 14, 1964	Pearson	June 13, 1994	Resignation
Léopold Langlois	Liberal	Quebec	July 8, 1966	Pearson	October 2, 1988	Retirement
Renaude Lapointe	Liberal	Quebec	November 10, 1971	Trudeau	January 3, 1987	Retirement
Edward M. Lawson	Independent	British Columbia	October 7, 1970	Trudeau	September 24, 2004	Retirement
Fernand Leblanc	Liberal	Quebec	March 27, 1979	Trudeau	July 1, 1992	Retirement
Philip Lewis	Liberal	Newfoundland and Labrador	March 23, 1978	Trudeau	November 28, 1999	Retirement
Paul Lucier	Liberal	Yukon	October 23, 1975	Trudeau	July 23, 1999	Death
John Michael Macdonald	Progressive Conservative	Nova Scotia	June 24, 1960	Diefenbaker	June 20, 1997	Death
Ernest Manning	Social Credit	Alberta	October 7, 1970	Trudeau	September 20, 1983	Retirement
Jean Marchand	Liberal	Quebec	December 9, 1976	Trudeau	December 15, 1983	Resignation
Jack Marshall	Progressive Conservative	Newfoundland and Labrador	March 23, 1978	Trudeau	November 26, 1994	Retirement
Alexander Hamilton McDonald	Liberal	Saskatchewan	August 13, 1965	Pearson	March 31, 1980	Death
Charles McElman	Liberal	New Brunswick	February 24, 1966	Pearson	April 1, 1990	Resignation
Frederic McGrand	Liberal	New Brunswick	July 28, 1955	St. Laurent	January 22, 1988	Resignation
George McIlraith	Liberal	Ontario	April 27, 1972	Trudeau	July 29, 1983	Retirement
William Craig McNamara	Liberal	Manitoba	October 7, 1970	Trudeau	August 8, 1979	Retirement
Gildas Molgat	Liberal	Manitoba	October 7, 1970	Trudeau	February 28, 2001	Death
Hartland Molson	Independent	Quebec	July 28, 1955	St. Laurent	May 31, 1993	Resignation
Robert Muir	Progressive Conservative	Nova Scotia	March 26, 1979	Trudeau	November 10, 1994	Retirement
Joan Neiman	Liberal	Ontario	September 1, 1972	Trudeau	September 9, 1995	Retirement
Margaret Norrie	Liberal	Nova Scotia	April 27, 1972	Trudeau	October 16, 1980	Retirement
Bud Olson	Liberal	Alberta	April 5, 1977	Trudeau	March 7, 1996	Resignation
Norman McLeod Paterson	Liberal	Ontario	February 9, 1940	King	June 18, 1981	Resignation
Ray Perrault	Liberal	British Columbia	October 5, 1973	Trudeau	February 6, 2001	Retirement
William Petten	Liberal	Newfoundland and Labrador	April 8, 1968	Pearson	January 28, 1998	Retirement
Orville Howard Phillips	Progressive Conservative	Prince Edward Island	February 5, 1963	Diefenbaker	March 24, 1999	Resignation
Josie Alice Quart	Progressive Conservative	Quebec	November 16, 1960	Diefenbaker	April 17, 1980	Death
Maurice Riel	Liberal	Quebec	October 5, 1973	Trudeau	April 3, 1997	Retirement
Daniel Aloysius Riley	Liberal	New Brunswick	December 21, 1973	Trudeau	September 13, 1984	Death
Pietro Rizzuto	Liberal	Quebec	December 23, 1976	Trudeau	August 3, 1997	Death
Louis Robichaud	Liberal	New Brunswick	December 21, 1973	Trudeau	October 21, 2000	Retirement
Dufferin Roblin	Progressive Conservative	Manitoba	March 23, 1978	Trudeau	June 17, 1992	Retirement
Yvette Boucher Rousseau	Liberal	Quebec	March 27, 1979	Trudeau	March 17, 1988	Death
Frederick William Rowe	Liberal	Newfoundland and Labrador	December 9, 1971	Trudeau	September 28, 1987	Retirement
Donald Smith	Liberal	Nova Scotia	July 28, 1955	St. Laurent	July 7, 1980	Resignation
George Isaac Smith	Progressive Conservative	Nova Scotia	August 7, 1975	Trudeau	December 19, 1982	Death
Herbert O. Sparrow	Liberal	Saskatchewan	February 9, 1968	Pearson	January 4, 2005	Retirement
Richard Stanbury	Liberal	Ontario	February 13, 1968	Pearson	May 2, 1998	Retirement
David Steuart	Liberal	Saskatchewan	December 9, 1976	Trudeau	January 26, 1991	Retirement
Joseph Albert Sullivan	Progressive Conservative	Ontario	October 12, 1957	Diefenbaker	February 18, 1985	Resignation
Norbert Thériault	Liberal	New Brunswick	March 26, 1979	Trudeau	February 16, 1996	Retirement
Andy Thompson	Liberal	Ontario	April 6, 1967	Pearson	March 23, 1998	Resignation
George Van Roggen	Liberal	British Columbia	November 4, 1971	Trudeau	June 8, 1992	Death
Claude Wagner	Progressive Conservative	Quebec	April 21, 1978	Trudeau	July 11, 1979	Death
David James Walker	Progressive Conservative	Ontario	February 4, 1963	Diefenbaker	September 30, 1989	Resignation
Guy Williams	Liberal	British Columbia	December 9, 1971	Trudeau	October 7, 1982	Retirement
Dalia Wood	Liberal	Quebec	March 26, 1979	Trudeau	January 31, 1999	Resignation
Paul Yuzyk	Progressive Conservative	Manitoba	February 4, 1963	Diefenbaker	July 9, 1986	Death

=== Senators appointed during the 31st Parliament ===
Name	Party	Province (Division)	Date appointed	Appointed by	Left office	Reason
**Robert de Cotret**	**Progressive Conservative**	**Ontario**	**June 5, 1979**	**Clark**	**January 14, 1980**	**Resignation**
Richard Donahoe	Progressive Conservative	Nova Scotia	September 13, 1979	Clark	September 27, 1984	Retirement
Lowell Murray	Progressive Conservative	Ontario	September 13, 1979	Clark	September 26, 2011	Retirement
James Balfour	Progressive Conservative	Saskatchewan	September 13, 1979	Clark	December 12, 1999	Death
Arthur Tremblay	Progressive Conservative	Quebec	September 27, 1979	Clark	June 18, 1992	Retirement
Guy Charbonneau	Progressive Conservative	Quebec	September 27, 1979	Clark	June 21, 1997	Retirement
Martha Bielish	Progressive Conservative	Alberta	September 27, 1979	Clark	September 26, 1990	Resignation
Nathan Nurgitz	Progressive Conservative	Manitoba	October 3, 1979	Clark	February 9, 1993	Resignation
Heath MacQuarrie	Progressive Conservative	Prince Edward Island	October 3, 1979	Clark	September 18, 1994	Retirement
C. William Doody	Progressive Conservative	Newfoundland and Labrador	October 3, 1979	Clark	December 27, 2005	Death
Cyril Sherwood	Progressive Conservative	New Brunswick	October 3, 1979	Clark	July 1, 1990	Retirement

=== Left Senate during the 31st Parliament ===
Date	Name	Party	Representing	Details
May 29, 1979	Eugene Forsey	Liberal	Ontario	Retirement
July 11, 1979	Claude Wagner	Progressive Conservative	Quebec	Death
August 8, 1979	William Craig McNamara	Liberal	Manitoba	Retirement
**January 14, 1980**	**Robert de Cotret**	**Progressive Conservative**	**Ontario**	**Resignation**

=== Changes in party affiliation during the 31st Parliament ===
There were no changes in party affiliation during the 31st Parliament.

== See also ==
- List of current Canadian senators
