= List of senators in the 34th Parliament of Canada =

This is a list of members of the Senate of Canada in the 34th Parliament of Canada.

The province of Quebec has 24 Senate divisions which are constitutionally mandated. In all other provinces, a Senate division is strictly an optional designation of the senator's own choosing, and has no real constitutional or legal standing. A senator who does not choose a special senate division is designated a senator for the province at large.

Names in bold indicate senators in the 24th or 25th Canadian Ministry.

== List of senators ==
=== Senators at the beginning of the 34th Parliament ===
Name	Party	Province (Division)	Date appointed	Appointed by	Left office	Reason
Willie Adams	Liberal	Northwest Territories	April 5, 1977	Trudeau	June 22, 2009	Retirement
Margaret Jean Anderson	Liberal	New Brunswick	March 23, 1978	Trudeau	August 7, 1990	Retirement
Hazen Argue	Liberal	Saskatchewan	February 24, 1966	Pearson	October 2, 1991	Death
Martial Asselin	Progressive Conservative	Quebec	September 1, 1972	Trudeau	August 7, 1990	Resignation
Norman Atkins	Progressive Conservative	Ontario	June 30, 1986	Mulroney	June 27, 2009	Retirement
Jack Austin	Liberal	British Columbia	August 19, 1975	Trudeau	March 2, 2007	Retirement
James Balfour	Progressive Conservative	Saskatchewan	September 13, 1979	Clark	December 12, 1999	Death
Staff Barootes	Progressive Conservative	Saskatchewan	December 21, 1984	Mulroney	May 25, 1993	Resignation
Jean Bazin	Progressive Conservative	Quebec	December 29, 1986	Mulroney	December 8, 1989	Resignation
Gérald Beaudoin	Progressive Conservative	Quebec	September 26, 1988	Mulroney	April 15, 2004	Retirement
Rhéal Bélisle	Progressive Conservative	Ontario	February 4, 1963	Diefenbaker	November 3, 1992	Death
Nancy Bell	Independent	British Columbia	October 7, 1970	Trudeau	November 29, 1989	Death
Martha Bielish	Progressive Conservative	Alberta	September 27, 1979	Clark	September 26, 1990	Resignation
Roch Bolduc	Progressive Conservative	Quebec	September 26, 1988	Mulroney	September 10, 2003	Retirement
Lorne Bonnell	Liberal	Prince Edward Island	November 4, 1971	Trudeau	January 4, 1998	Retirement
Peter Bosa	Liberal	Ontario	April 5, 1977	Trudeau	December 10, 1998	Death
Sidney Buckwold	Liberal	Saskatchewan	November 4, 1971	Trudeau	November 3, 1991	Retirement
Solange Chaput-Rolland	Progressive Conservative	Quebec	September 26, 1988	Mulroney	May 14, 1994	Retirement
Guy Charbonneau	Progressive Conservative	Quebec	September 27, 1979	Clark	June 21, 1997	Retirement
Ethel Cochrane	Progressive Conservative	Newfoundland and Labrador	November 17, 1986	Mulroney	September 23, 2012	Retirement
Michel Cogger	Progressive Conservative	Quebec	May 2, 1986	Mulroney	September 1, 2000	Resignation
Anne Cools	Liberal	Ontario	January 13, 1984	Trudeau	August 12, 2018	Retirement
Eymard Corbin	Liberal	New Brunswick	July 9, 1984	Turner	August 2, 2009	Retirement
Ernest G. Cottreau	Liberal	Nova Scotia	May 8, 1974	Trudeau	January 28, 1989	Retirement
David Croll	Liberal	Ontario	July 28, 1955	St. Laurent	June 11, 1991	Death
Keith Davey	Liberal	Ontario	February 24, 1966	Pearson	July 1, 1996	Resignation
Paul David	Progressive Conservative	Quebec	April 16, 1985	Mulroney	December 25, 1994	Retirement
Pierre de Bané	Liberal	Quebec	June 29, 1984	Trudeau	August 2, 2013	Retirement
Azellus Denis	Liberal	Quebec	February 3, 1964	Pearson	September 4, 1991	Death
C. William Doody	Progressive Conservative	Newfoundland and Labrador	October 3, 1979	Clark	December 27, 2005	Death
Richard Doyle	Progressive Conservative	Ontario	March 19, 1985	Mulroney	March 10, 1998	Retirement
Douglas Everett	Liberal	Manitoba	November 8, 1966	Pearson	January 20, 1994	Resignation
Joyce Fairbairn	Liberal	Alberta	June 29, 1984	Trudeau	January 18, 2013	Resignation
Jacques Flynn	Progressive Conservative	Quebec	November 9, 1962	Diefenbaker	August 22, 1990	Resignation
Royce Frith	Liberal	Ontario	April 5, 1977	Trudeau	August 29, 1994	Resignation
Philippe Gigantès	Liberal	Quebec	January 13, 1984	Trudeau	August 16, 1998	Retirement
Jerry Grafstein	Liberal	Ontario	January 13, 1984	Trudeau	January 2, 2010	Retirement
Alasdair Graham	Liberal	Nova Scotia	April 27, 1972	Trudeau	May 21, 2004	Retirement
Joseph-Philippe Guay	Liberal	Manitoba	March 23, 1978	Trudeau	October 4, 1990	Retirement
Stanley Haidasz	Liberal	Ontario	March 23, 1978	Trudeau	March 4, 1998	Retirement
Earl Hastings	Liberal	Alberta	February 24, 1966	Pearson	May 5, 1996	Death
Dan Hays	Liberal	Alberta	June 29, 1984	Trudeau	June 30, 2007	Resignation
Jacques Hébert	Liberal	Quebec	April 20, 1983	Trudeau	June 21, 1998	Retirement
Henry Hicks	Liberal	Nova Scotia	April 27, 1972	Trudeau	March 5, 1990	Retirement
William McDonough Kelly	Progressive Conservative	Ontario	December 23, 1982	Trudeau	July 21, 2000	Retirement
Colin Kenny	Liberal	Ontario	June 29, 1984	Trudeau	February 2, 2018	Resignation
Michael J. L. Kirby	Liberal	Nova Scotia	January 13, 1984	Trudeau	October 31, 2006	Resignation
Leo Kolber	Liberal	Quebec	December 23, 1983	Trudeau	January 18, 2004	Retirement
Daniel Lang	Independent	Ontario	February 14, 1964	Pearson	June 13, 1994	Resignation
Edward M. Lawson	Independent	British Columbia	October 7, 1970	Trudeau	September 24, 2004	Retirement
Fernand Leblanc	Liberal	Quebec	March 27, 1979	Trudeau	July 1, 1992	Retirement
Roméo LeBlanc	Liberal	New Brunswick	June 29, 1984	Trudeau	November 21, 1994	Resignation
Thomas Lefebvre	Liberal	Quebec	July 9, 1984	Turner	November 20, 1992	Death
Philip Lewis	Liberal	Newfoundland and Labrador	March 23, 1978	Trudeau	November 28, 1999	Retirement
Paul Lucier	Liberal	Yukon	October 23, 1975	Trudeau	July 23, 1999	Death
Finlay MacDonald	Progressive Conservative	Nova Scotia	December 21, 1984	Mulroney	January 4, 1998	Retirement
John Michael Macdonald	Progressive Conservative	Nova Scotia	June 24, 1960	Diefenbaker	June 20, 1997	Death
Allan MacEachen	Liberal	Nova Scotia	June 29, 1984	Trudeau	July 6, 1996	Retirement
Heath MacQuarrie	Progressive Conservative	Prince Edward Island	October 3, 1979	Clark	September 18, 1994	Retirement
Leonard Marchand	Liberal	British Columbia	June 29, 1984	Trudeau	March 1, 1998	Resignation
Lorna Marsden	Liberal	Ontario	January 24, 1984	Trudeau	August 31, 1992	Resignation
Jack Marshall	Progressive Conservative	Newfoundland and Labrador	March 23, 1978	Trudeau	November 26, 1994	Retirement
Charles McElman	Liberal	New Brunswick	February 24, 1966	Pearson	April 1, 1990	Resignation
Gildas Molgat	Liberal	Manitoba	October 7, 1970	Trudeau	February 28, 2001	Death
Hartland Molson	Independent	Quebec	July 28, 1955	St. Laurent	May 31, 1993	Resignation
Robert Muir	Progressive Conservative	Nova Scotia	March 26, 1979	Trudeau	November 10, 1994	Retirement
**Lowell Murray**	**Progressive Conservative**	**Ontario**	**September 13, 1979**	**Clark**	**September 26, 2011**	**Retirement**
Joan Neiman	Liberal	Ontario	September 1, 1972	Trudeau	September 9, 1995	Retirement
Nathan Nurgitz	Progressive Conservative	Manitoba	October 3, 1979	Clark	February 9, 1993	Resignation
Bud Olson	Liberal	Alberta	April 5, 1977	Trudeau	March 7, 1996	Resignation
Gerry Ottenheimer	Progressive Conservative	Newfoundland and Labrador	December 30, 1987	Mulroney	January 18, 1998	Death
Ray Perrault	Liberal	British Columbia	October 5, 1973	Trudeau	February 6, 2001	Retirement
William Petten	Liberal	Newfoundland and Labrador	April 8, 1968	Pearson	January 28, 1998	Retirement
Orville Howard Phillips	Progressive Conservative	Prince Edward Island	February 5, 1963	Diefenbaker	March 24, 1999	Resignation
Michael Pitfield	Independent	Ontario	December 22, 1982	Trudeau	June 1, 2010	Resignation
Jean-Marie Poitras	Progressive Conservative	Quebec	September 26, 1988	Mulroney	May 25, 1993	Resignation
Maurice Riel	Liberal	Quebec	October 5, 1973	Trudeau	April 3, 1997	Retirement
Pietro Rizzuto	Liberal	Quebec	December 23, 1976	Trudeau	August 3, 1997	Death
Brenda Robertson	Progressive Conservative	New Brunswick	December 21, 1984	Mulroney	May 23, 2004	Retirement
Louis Robichaud	Liberal	New Brunswick	December 21, 1973	Trudeau	October 21, 2000	Retirement
Dufferin Roblin	Progressive Conservative	Manitoba	March 23, 1978	Trudeau	June 17, 1992	Retirement
Eileen Rossiter	Progressive Conservative	Prince Edward Island	November 17, 1986	Mulroney	July 14, 2004	Retirement
Cyril Sherwood	Progressive Conservative	New Brunswick	October 3, 1979	Clark	July 1, 1990	Retirement
Jean-Maurice Simard	Progressive Conservative	New Brunswick	June 26, 1985	Mulroney	June 16, 2001	Death
Herbert O. Sparrow	Liberal	Saskatchewan	February 9, 1968	Pearson	January 4, 2005	Retirement
Mira Spivak	Progressive Conservative	Manitoba	November 17, 1986	Mulroney	July 12, 2009	Retirement
Richard Stanbury	Liberal	Ontario	February 13, 1968	Pearson	May 2, 1998	Retirement
David Steuart	Liberal	Saskatchewan	December 9, 1976	Trudeau	January 26, 1991	Retirement
John Benjamin Stewart	Liberal	Nova Scotia	January 13, 1984	Trudeau	November 19, 1999	Retirement
Peter Stollery	Liberal	Ontario	July 2, 1981	Trudeau	November 29, 2010	Retirement
Norbert Thériault	Liberal	New Brunswick	March 26, 1979	Trudeau	February 16, 1996	Retirement
Andy Thompson	Liberal	Ontario	April 6, 1967	Pearson	March 23, 1998	Resignation
Arthur Tremblay	Progressive Conservative	Quebec	September 27, 1979	Clark	June 18, 1992	Retirement
Charles Turner	Liberal	Ontario	July 9, 1984	Turner	March 24, 1991	Retirement
George Van Roggen	Liberal	British Columbia	November 4, 1971	Trudeau	June 8, 1992	Death
David James Walker	Progressive Conservative	Ontario	February 4, 1963	Diefenbaker	September 30, 1989	Resignation
Charlie Watt	Liberal	Quebec	January 16, 1984	Trudeau	March 16, 2018	Resignation
Dalia Wood	Liberal	Quebec	March 26, 1979	Trudeau	January 31, 1999	Resignation

=== Senators appointed during the 34th Parliament ===
Name	Party	Province (Division)	Date appointed	Appointed by	Left office	Reason
Stanley Waters	Reform	Alberta	June 11, 1990	Mulroney	September 25, 1991	Death
Pat Carney	Progressive Conservative	British Columbia	August 30, 1990	Mulroney	January 31, 2008	Resignation
Consiglio Di Nino	Progressive Conservative	Ontario	August 30, 1990	Mulroney	June 30, 2012	Resignation
Mario Beaulieu	Progressive Conservative	Quebec	August 30, 1990	Mulroney	June 22, 1994	Resignation
Gerald Comeau	Progressive Conservative	Nova Scotia	August 30, 1990	Mulroney	November 30, 2013	Resignation
Nancy Teed	Progressive Conservative	New Brunswick	August 30, 1990	Mulroney	January 29, 1993	Death
Richard Hatfield	Progressive Conservative	New Brunswick	September 7, 1990	Mulroney	April 26, 1991	Death
John Sylvain	Progressive Conservative	Quebec	September 7, 1990	Mulroney	February 1, 1996	Resignation
Donald Oliver	Progressive Conservative	Nova Scotia	September 7, 1990	Mulroney	November 16, 2013	Retirement
Noël Kinsella	Progressive Conservative	New Brunswick	September 12, 1990	Mulroney	November 27, 2014	Retirement
John Buchanan	Progressive Conservative	Nova Scotia	September 12, 1990	Mulroney	April 22, 2006	Retirement
Trevor Eyton	Progressive Conservative	Ontario	September 23, 1990	Mulroney	July 12, 2009	Retirement
Mabel DeWare	Progressive Conservative	New Brunswick	September 23, 1990	Mulroney	August 9, 2001	Retirement
James Kelleher	Progressive Conservative	Ontario	September 23, 1990	Mulroney	October 2, 2005	Retirement
John Lynch-Staunton	Progressive Conservative	Quebec	September 23, 1990	Mulroney	June 19, 2005	Retirement
Claude Castonguay	Progressive Conservative	Quebec	September 23, 1990	Mulroney	December 9, 1992	Resignation
Eric Berntson	Progressive Conservative	Saskatchewan	September 27, 1990	Mulroney	February 27, 2001	Resignation
Janis Johnson	Progressive Conservative	Manitoba	September 27, 1990	Mulroney	September 27, 2016	Resignation
James W. Ross	Progressive Conservative	Maritimes	September 27, 1990	Mulroney	May 25, 1993	Resignation
Thérèse Lavoie-Roux	Progressive Conservative	Quebec	September 27, 1990	Mulroney	March 12, 2001	Resignation
Walter Patrick Twinn	Progressive Conservative	Alberta	September 27, 1990	Mulroney	October 30, 1997	Death
Michael Forrestall	Progressive Conservative	Nova Scotia	September 27, 1990	Mulroney	June 8, 2006	Death
Michael Meighen	Progressive Conservative	Ontario	September 27, 1990	Mulroney	February 6, 2012	Resignation
Wilbert Keon	Progressive Conservative	Ontario	September 27, 1990	Mulroney	May 17, 2010	Retirement
Normand Grimard	Progressive Conservative	Quebec	September 27, 1990	Mulroney	June 16, 2000	Retirement
Jean-Claude Rivest	Progressive Conservative	Quebec	March 11, 1993	Mulroney	January 31, 2015	Resignation
Raynell Andreychuk	Progressive Conservative	Saskatchewan	March 11, 1993	Mulroney	August 14, 2019	Retirement
Ron Ghitter	Progressive Conservative	Alberta	March 25, 1993	Mulroney	March 31, 2000	Resignation
Terry Stratton	Progressive Conservative	Manitoba	March 25, 1993	Mulroney	March 16, 2013	Retirement
Duncan Jessiman	Progressive Conservative	Manitoba	May 26, 1993	Mulroney	June 5, 1998	Retirement
Fernand Roberge	Progressive Conservative	Quebec	May 26, 1993	Mulroney	July 19, 2000	Resignation
Lenard Gustafson	Progressive Conservative	Saskatchewan	May 26, 1993	Mulroney	November 10, 2008	Retirement
Marcel Prud'homme	Independent	Quebec	May 26, 1993	Mulroney	November 30, 2009	Retirement
Jean Noël Desmarais	Progressive Conservative	Ontario	June 4, 1993	Mulroney	July 25, 1995	Death
Erminie Cohen	Progressive Conservative	New Brunswick	June 4, 1993	Mulroney	July 23, 2001	Retirement
David Tkachuk	Progressive Conservative	Saskatchewan	June 8, 1993	Mulroney	Incumbent	
W. David Angus	Progressive Conservative	Quebec	June 10, 1993	Mulroney	July 21, 2012	Retirement
Pierre Claude Nolin	Progressive Conservative	Quebec	June 18, 1993	Mulroney	April 23, 2015	Death
Marjory LeBreton	Progressive Conservative	Ontario	June 18, 1993	Mulroney	July 4, 2015	Retirement
Gerry St. Germain	Progressive Conservative	British Columbia	June 23, 1993	Mulroney	November 6, 2012	Retirement

=== Left Senate during the 34th Parliament ===
Date	Name	Party	Representing	Details
January 28, 1989	Ernest G. Cottreau	Liberal	Nova Scotia	Retirement
September 30, 1989	David James Walker	Progressive Conservative	Ontario	Resignation
November 29, 1989	Nancy Bell	Independent	British Columbia	Death
December 8, 1989	Jean Bazin	Progressive Conservative	Quebec	Resignation
March 5, 1990	Henry Hicks	Liberal	Nova Scotia	Retirement
April 1, 1990	Charles McElman	Liberal	New Brunswick	Resignation
July 1, 1990	Cyril Sherwood	Progressive Conservative	New Brunswick	Retirement
August 7, 1990	Martial Asselin	Progressive Conservative	Quebec	Resignation
August 7, 1990	Margaret Jean Anderson	Liberal	New Brunswick	Retirement
August 22, 1990	Jacques Flynn	Progressive Conservative	Quebec	Resignation
September 26, 1990	Martha Bielish	Progressive Conservative	Alberta	Resignation
October 4, 1990	Joseph-Philippe Guay	Liberal	Manitoba	Retirement
January 26, 1991	David Steuart	Liberal	Saskatchewan	Retirement
March 24, 1991	Charles Turner	Liberal	Ontario	Retirement
April 26, 1991	Richard Hatfield	Progressive Conservative	New Brunswick	Death
June 11, 1991	David Croll	Liberal	Ontario	Death
September 4, 1991	Azellus Denis	Liberal	Quebec	Death
September 25, 1991	Stanley Waters	Reform	Alberta	Death
October 2, 1991	Hazen Argue	Liberal	Saskatchewan	Death
November 3, 1991	Sidney Buckwold	Liberal	Saskatchewan	Retirement
June 8, 1992	George Van Roggen	Liberal	British Columbia	Death
June 17, 1992	Dufferin Roblin	Progressive Conservative	Manitoba	Retirement
June 18, 1992	Arthur Tremblay	Progressive Conservative	Quebec	Retirement
July 1, 1992	Fernand Leblanc	Liberal	Quebec	Retirement
August 31, 1992	Lorna Marsden	Liberal	Ontario	Resignation
November 3, 1992	Rhéal Bélisle	Progressive Conservative	Ontario	Death
November 20, 1992	Thomas Lefebvre	Liberal	Quebec	Death
December 9, 1992	Claude Castonguay	Progressive Conservative	Quebec	Resignation
January 29, 1993	Nancy Teed	Progressive Conservative	New Brunswick	Death
February 9, 1993	Nathan Nurgitz	Progressive Conservative	Manitoba	Resignation
May 25, 1993	James W. Ross	Progressive Conservative	Maritimes	Resignation
May 25, 1993	Staff Barootes	Progressive Conservative	Saskatchewan	Resignation
May 25, 1993	Jean-Marie Poitras	Progressive Conservative	Quebec	Resignation
May 31, 1993	Hartland Molson	Independent	Quebec	Resignation

=== Changes in party affiliation during the 34th Parliament ===
Date	Name	Party (subsequent)	Party (previous)	Details
December 12, 1989	Douglas Everett	Independent Liberal	Liberal	
December 13, 1990	Douglas Everett	Independent	Independent Liberal	

== See also ==
- List of current Canadian senators
