= List of Canadian federal parliaments =

The Parliament of Canada is the legislative body of the government of Canada. The Parliament is composed of the House of Commons (lower house), the Senate (upper house), and the sovereign, represented by the governor general. Most major legislation originates from the Commons, as it is the only body that is directly elected. A new parliament begins after an election of the House of Commons and can sit for up to five years. The number of seats in parliament has varied as new provinces joined the country and as population distribution between the provinces changed; there are currently 343 House MPs and 105 Senators (when there are no vacancies).

Canada uses a Westminster-style parliamentary government, in which the leader of the party with the most seats in the House of Commons becomes Prime Minister, even if the leader is not an elected member of parliament. The leader of the party with the second-most seats in the House becomes the leader of the Official Opposition, and debate (formally called Oral Questions) between the parties is presided over by the speaker of the House. When the party with the most seats has less than half of the total number of seats, it forms a minority government, which can be voted out of power by the other parties. The Canadian Parliament is located at Parliament Hill in the capital city, Ottawa, Ontario.

== Parliaments ==
Diagram (Note: The diagrams show the composition of each parliament, colour-coded by party (click on an image to see its key) and arranged as the MPs might sit. The speaker of the house is shown on the left hand side, with the governing party on the speaker's right (the bottom of the diagram) and the opposition on the speaker's left (the top).)	Parliament Election Sessions	Duration (from return of the writs to dissolution)	Government		Opposition	
Diagram	Parliament Election Sessions	Duration (from return of the writs to dissolution)	Governing Party • Prime Minister—Ministry	Seat counts as of election	Official Opposition Party • Leader of the Opposition	Third Parties with official party status
	1st Canadian Parliament; Elected 1867; 5 sessions	Sep 24, 1867 – Jul 8, 1872	Conservative Party: Sir John A. Macdonald—1st Ministry	100 of 180 House seats (Note: In Canada's early parliaments, many members of the Conservative Party, including the Prime Minister, used other labels for themselves, the most common being "Liberal-Conservative". The seat totals here is the sum of all labels Conservative Party labels.)	none	Liberal Party; Anti-Confederation Party
	2nd Canadian Parliament; Elected 1872; 2 sessions	Sep 3, 1872 – Jan 2, 1874	Conservative Party (1872–1873): Sir John A. Macdonald—1st Ministry	99 of 200 House seats (Note: There were two Independent Conservatives in the 2nd Parliament, giving the government an effective majority.)	Liberal Party: Alexander Mackenzie	none
	2nd Canadian Parliament; Elected 1872; 2 sessions	Sep 3, 1872 – Jan 2, 1874	Liberal Party (1873–1874): Alexander Mackenzie—2nd Ministry	95 of 200 House seats (minority) (Note: After the 2nd parliament's Pacific Scandal, the Liberals took power between elections.)	Conservative Party: Sir John A. Macdonald	none
	3rd Canadian Parliament; Elected 1874; 5 sessions	Feb 21, 1874 – Aug 16, 1878	Liberal Party: Alexander Mackenzie—2nd Ministry	129 of 206 House seats	Conservative Party: Sir John A. Macdonald	none
	4th Canadian Parliament; Elected 1878; 4 sessions	Nov 21, 1878 – May 18, 1882	Conservative Party: Sir John A. Macdonald—3rd Ministry	134 of 206 House seats	Liberal Party: Alexander Mackenzie; Edward Blake	none
	5th Canadian Parliament; Elected 1882; 4 sessions	Aug 7, 1882 – Jan 15, 1887	Conservative Party: Sir John A. Macdonald—3rd Ministry	133 of 211 House seats	Liberal Party: Edward Blake	none
	6th Canadian Parliament; Elected 1887; 4 sessions	Apr 13, 1887 – Feb 3, 1891	Conservative Party: Sir John A. Macdonald—3rd Ministry	122 of 215 House seats	Liberal Party: Edward Blake; Wilfrid Laurier	none
	7th Canadian Parliament; Elected 1891; 6 sessions	Apr 7, 1891 – Apr 24, 1896	Conservative Party: Sir John A. Macdonald—3rd Ministry; Sir John Abbott—4th Ministry; Sir John Thompson—5th Ministry; Sir Mackenzie Bowell—6th Ministry; (Note: After the dissolution of the 7th Canadian Parliament, Mackenzie Bowell stepped down and Sir Charles Tupper became Prime Minister on May 1, 1896. Tupper was the only Prime Minister during the 1896 election campaign, which he lost, so he was never Prime Minister of a sitting parliament and is therefore not included in this list.)	117 of 215 House seats	Liberal Party: Wilfrid Laurier	none
	8th Canadian Parliament; Elected 1896; 5 sessions	Jul 13, 1896 – Oct 9, 1900	Liberal Party: Sir Wilfrid Laurier—8th Ministry	117 of 213 House seats	Conservative Party: Sir Charles Tupper	none
	9th Canadian Parliament; Elected 1900; 4 sessions	Dec 5, 1900 – Sep 29, 1904	Liberal Party: Sir Wilfrid Laurier—8th Ministry	128 of 213 House seats	Conservative Party: Robert Borden	none
	10th Canadian Parliament; Elected 1904; 4 sessions	Dec 15, 1904 – Sep 17, 1908	Liberal Party: Sir Wilfrid Laurier—8th Ministry	137 of 214 House seats	Conservative Party: Robert Borden	none
	11th Canadian Parliament; Elected 1908; 3 sessions	Dec 3, 1908 – Jul 29, 1911	Liberal Party: Sir Wilfrid Laurier—8th Ministry	133 of 221 House seats	Conservative Party: Robert Borden	none
	12th Canadian Parliament; Elected 1911; 7 sessions	Oct 7, 1911 – Oct 6, 1917	Conservative Party: Sir Robert Borden—9th Ministry	132 of 221 House seats	Liberal Party: Sir Wilfrid Laurier	none
	13th Canadian Parliament; Elected 1917; 5 sessions	Mar 16, 1918 – Oct 4, 1921	Unionist coalition (1918–1920): Sir Robert Borden—10th Ministry	153 of 235 House seats (coalition) (Note: During the First World War, Borden governed from a united party with a Cabinet of 12 Conservatives, 9 Liberals and Independents, and 1 "Labour" MP. There were, however, still a number of MPs in opposition to him.)	Laurier Liberals: Sir Wilfrid Laurier; Daniel Duncan McKenzie; William Lyon Mackenzie King	none
	13th Canadian Parliament; Elected 1917; 5 sessions	Mar 16, 1918 – Oct 4, 1921	National Liberal and Conservative Party (1920–1921): Arthur Meighen—11th Ministry	153 of 235 House seats (coalition)	Laurier Liberals: Sir Wilfrid Laurier; Daniel Duncan McKenzie; William Lyon Mackenzie King	none
	14th Canadian Parliament; Elected 1921; 4 sessions	Jan 15, 1922 – Sep 5, 1925	Liberal Party: William Lyon Mackenzie King—12th Ministry	118 of 235 House seats (Note: In the 14th Parliament, King’s Liberals won exactly enough seats to form a slim majority government, and due to resignations and floor crossing, they shifted back and forth between majority and minority status. However, the government was in little danger of losing a confidence vote because the Progressive party usually allowed free votes among its members, some of whom would always vote with the government.)	Conservative Party (Note: In the 14th parliament, the new Progressive Party led by Thomas Crerar had the second-most seats, yet Arthur Meighen's Conservatives formed official opposition.): Arthur Meighen	Progressive Party
	15th Canadian Parliament; Elected 1925; 1 session	Dec 7, 1925 – Jul 2, 1926	Liberal Party (1925–1926): William Lyon Mackenzie King—12th Ministry	100 of 245 House seats (minority) (Note: In the 15th parliament, Mackenzie King's Liberals were initially supported by some members of the Progressive Party of Canada until one of King's appointees in the Department of Customs and Excise was revealed to have taken bribes.)	Conservative Party (1925–1926): Arthur Meighen	Progressive Party
	15th Canadian Parliament; Elected 1925; 1 session	Dec 7, 1925 – Jul 2, 1926	Conservative Party (1926): Arthur Meighen—13th Ministry	115 of 245 House seats (minority) (Note: In the 15th parliament, Arthur Meighen's Conservatives had the most seats, but Mackenzie King formed the government with the support of the Progressive Party. After the King–Byng Affair, Arthur Meighen's Conservatives took power between elections.)	Liberal Party (1926): William Lyon Mackenzie King	Progressive Party
	16th Canadian Parliament; Elected 1926; 4 sessions	Nov 2, 1926 – May 30, 1930	Liberal Party: William Lyon Mackenzie King—14th Ministry	116 of 245 House seats (minority) (Note: In the 16th parliament, Mackenzie King's Liberals were supported by some members of the Progressive Party of Canada, which did not enforce strict party discipline.)	Conservative Party: Hugh Guthrie; Richard Bennett	none
	17th Canadian Parliament; Elected 1930; 6 sessions	Aug 18, 1930 – Aug 14, 1935	Conservative Party: Richard Bennett—15th Ministry	134 of 245 House seats	Liberal Party: William Lyon Mackenzie King	none
	18th Canadian Parliament; Elected 1935; 6 sessions	Nov 9, 1935 – Jan 25, 1940	Liberal Party: William Lyon Mackenzie King—16th Ministry	173 of 245 House seats	Conservative Party: Richard Bennett; Robert Manion	Social Credit Party
	19th Canadian Parliament; Elected 1940; 6 sessions	Apr 17, 1940 – Apr 16, 1945	Liberal Party: William Lyon Mackenzie King—16th Ministry	179 of 245 House seats	Conservative Party (Note: In the 1940 election, Hanson's Conservative's ran under the name "National Government".): Richard Hanson; Gordon Graydon	none
	20th Canadian Parliament; Elected 1945; 5 sessions	Aug 9, 1945 – Apr 30, 1949	Liberal Party: William Lyon Mackenzie King—16th Ministry; Louis St. Laurent—17th Ministry	118 of 245 House seats (minority)	Progressive Conservative Party: John Bracken; George Drew	Co-operative Commonwealth Federation; Social Credit Party
	21st Canadian Parliament; Elected 1949; 7 sessions	Aug 29, 1949 – Jun 13, 1953	Liberal Party: Louis St. Laurent—17th Ministry	191 of 262 House seats	Progressive Conservative Party: George Drew	Co-operative Commonwealth Federation
	22nd Canadian Parliament; Elected 1953; 5 sessions	Oct 8, 1953 – Apr 12, 1957	Liberal Party: Louis St. Laurent—17th Ministry	169 of 265 House seats	Progressive Conservative Party: George Drew; William Earl Rowe; George Drew; John Diefenbaker	Co-operative Commonwealth Federation; Social Credit Party
	23rd Canadian Parliament; Elected 1957; 1 session	Aug 8, 1957 – Feb 1, 1958	Progressive Conservative Party: John Diefenbaker—18th Ministry	111 of 265 House seats (minority)	Liberal Party: Louis St. Laurent; Lester B. Pearson	Co-operative Commonwealth Federation; Social Credit Party
	24th Canadian Parliament; Elected 1958; 5 sessions	Apr 30, 1958 – Apr 19, 1962	Progressive Conservative Party: John Diefenbaker—18th Ministry	208 of 265 House seats	Liberal Party: Lester B. Pearson	none
	25th Canadian Parliament; Elected 1962; 1 session	Jul 18, 1962 – Feb 6, 1963	Progressive Conservative Party: John Diefenbaker—18th Ministry	116 of 265 House seats (minority)	Liberal Party: Lester B. Pearson	Social Credit Party; New Democratic Party
	26th Canadian Parliament; Elected 1963; 3 sessions	May 8, 1963 – Sep 8, 1965	Liberal Party: Lester B. Pearson—19th Ministry	128 of 265 House seats (minority) (Note: In the 26th parliament, Pearson's Liberals were initially supported by Tommy Douglas's New Democratic Party without forming an official coalition.)	Progressive Conservative Party: John Diefenbaker	Social Credit Party; New Democratic Party
	27th Canadian Parliament; Elected 1965; 2 sessions	Dec 9, 1965 – Apr 23, 1968	Liberal Party: Lester B. Pearson—19th Ministry; Pierre Trudeau—20th Ministry	131 of 265 House seats (minority) (Note: In the 27th parliament, Pearson's Liberals relied on the small opposition parties in order to remain in power without forming an official coalition.)	Progressive Conservative Party: John Diefenbaker; Michael Starr; Robert Stanfield	New Democratic Party
	28th Canadian Parliament; Elected 1968; 4 sessions	Jul 25, 1968 – Sep 1, 1972	Liberal Party: Pierre Trudeau—20th Ministry	154 of 264 House seats	Progressive Conservative Party: Robert Stanfield	New Democratic Party; Ralliement créditiste
	29th Canadian Parliament; Elected 1972; 2 sessions	Nov 20, 1972 – May 9, 1974	Liberal Party: Pierre Trudeau—20th Ministry	109 of 264 House seats (minority)	Progressive Conservative Party: Robert Stanfield	New Democratic Party; Social Credit Party
	30th Canadian Parliament; Elected 1974; 4 sessions	Jul 31, 1974 – Mar 26, 1979	Liberal Party: Pierre Trudeau—20th Ministry	141 of 264 House seats 76 of 102 Senate seats	Progressive Conservative Party: Robert Stanfield; Joe Clark	New Democratic Party
	31st Canadian Parliament; Elected 1979; 1 session	Jun 11, 1979 – Dec 14, 1979	Progressive Conservative Party: Joe Clark—21st Ministry	136 of 282 House seats (minority) 18 of 104 Senate seats	Liberal Party: Pierre Trudeau	New Democratic Party
	32nd Canadian Parliament; Elected 1980; 2 sessions	Mar 10, 1980 – Jul 9, 1984	Liberal Party: Pierre Trudeau—22nd Ministry; John Turner—23rd Ministry	147 of 282 House seats 71 of 104 Senate seats	Progressive Conservative Party: Joe Clark; Brian Mulroney	New Democratic Party
	33rd Canadian Parliament; Elected 1984; 2 sessions	Sep 24, 1984 – Oct 1, 1988	Progressive Conservative Party: Brian Mulroney—24th Ministry	211 of 282 House seats 23 of 104 Senate seats	Liberal Party: John Turner	New Democratic Party
	34th Canadian Parliament; Elected 1988; 3 sessions	Dec 12, 1988 – Sep 8, 1993	Progressive Conservative Party: Brian Mulroney—24th Ministry; Kim Campbell—25th Ministry	169 of 295 House seats 36 of 104 Senate seats (Note: In 1990, Prime Minister Brian Mulroney used Section 26 of the Constitution, a never-before used clause, to fill the Senate above its regular limit, giving his party 54 of 112 seats.)	Liberal Party: John Turner; Herb Gray; Jean Chrétien	New Democratic Party
	35th Canadian Parliament; Elected 1993; 2 sessions	Nov 15, 1993 – Apr 27, 1997	Liberal Party: Jean Chrétien—26th Ministry	177 of 295 House seats 41 of 104 Senate seats	Bloc Québécois: Lucien Bouchard; Gilles Duceppe; Michel Gauthier	Reform Party
	36th Canadian Parliament; Elected 1997; 2 sessions	Jun 23, 1997 – Oct 22, 2000	Liberal Party: Jean Chrétien—26th Ministry	155 of 301 House seats 51 of 104 Senate seats	Reform Party (1997–2000): Preston Manning	Bloc Québécois; New Democratic Party; Progressive Conservative Party
	36th Canadian Parliament; Elected 1997; 2 sessions	Jun 23, 1997 – Oct 22, 2000	Liberal Party: Jean Chrétien—26th Ministry	155 of 301 House seats 51 of 104 Senate seats	Canadian Alliance (2000): Deborah Grey; Stockwell Day	Bloc Québécois; New Democratic Party; Progressive Conservative Party
	37th Canadian Parliament; Elected 2000; 3 sessions	Dec 18, 2000 – May 23, 2004	Liberal Party: Jean Chrétien—26th Ministry; Paul Martin—27th Ministry	172 of 301 House seats 55 of 105 Senate seats	Canadian Alliance (2000–2004): Stockwell Day; John Reynolds; Stephen Harper; Grant Hill	Bloc Québécois; New Democratic Party; Progressive Conservative Party
	37th Canadian Parliament; Elected 2000; 3 sessions	Dec 18, 2000 – May 23, 2004	Liberal Party: Jean Chrétien—26th Ministry; Paul Martin—27th Ministry	172 of 301 House seats 55 of 105 Senate seats	Conservative Party (2004): Grant Hill; Stephen Harper	Bloc Québécois; New Democratic Party
	38th Canadian Parliament; Elected 2004; 1 session	Aug 23, 2004 – Nov 29, 2005	Liberal Party: Paul Martin—27th Ministry	135 of 308 House seats (minority) (Note: In the 38th parliament, Martin's Liberals were initially supported by Jack Layton's New Democratic Party without forming an official coalition.) 64 of 105 Senate seats	Conservative Party: Stephen Harper	Bloc Québécois; New Democratic Party
	39th Canadian Parliament; Elected 2006; 2 sessions	Feb 13, 2006 – Sep 7, 2008	Conservative Party: Stephen Harper—28th Ministry	124 of 308 House seats (minority) 23 of 105 Senate seats	Liberal Party: Bill Graham; Stéphane Dion	Bloc Québécois; New Democratic Party
	40th Canadian Parliament; Elected 2008; 3 sessions	Nov 4, 2008 – Mar 26, 2011	Conservative Party: Stephen Harper—28th Ministry	143 of 308 House seats (minority) 21 of 105 Senate seats	Liberal Party: Stéphane Dion; Michael Ignatieff	Bloc Québécois; New Democratic Party
	41st Canadian Parliament; Elected 2011; 2 sessions	May 23, 2011 – Aug 2, 2015	Conservative Party: Stephen Harper—28th Ministry	166 of 308 House seats 52 of 105 Senate seats	New Democratic Party: Jack Layton; Nycole Turmel; Thomas Mulcair	Liberal Party; Senate Liberal Caucus
	42nd Canadian Parliament; Elected 2015; 1 session	Dec 3, 2015 – Sep 11, 2019	Liberal Party: Justin Trudeau—29th Ministry	184 of 338 House seats 0 of 105 Senate seats	Conservative Party: Rona Ambrose; Andrew Scheer	New Democratic Party; Independent Senators Group; Senate Liberal Caucus
	43rd Canadian Parliament; Elected 2019; 2 sessions	Dec 5, 2019 – Aug 15, 2021	Liberal Party: Justin Trudeau—29th Ministry	157 of 338 House seats (minority) 0 of 105 Senate seats	Conservative Party: Andrew Scheer; Erin O'Toole	Bloc Québécois; New Democratic Party; Independent Senators Group; Canadian Senators Group; Progressive Senate Group
	44th Canadian Parliament; Elected 2021; 1 session	Nov 22, 2021 – Mar 23, 2025	Liberal Party: Justin Trudeau—29th Ministry; Mark Carney—30th Ministry	160 of 338 House seats (minority) (Note: In the 44th parliament, Trudeau's Liberals were initially supported by Jagmeet Singh's New Democratic Party in a Confidence and supply agreement from March 2022 to September 2024 without forming an official coalition.) 0 of 105 Senate seats	Conservative Party: Erin O'Toole; Candice Bergen; Pierre Poilievre	Bloc Québécois; New Democratic Party; Independent Senators Group; Canadian Senators Group; Progressive Senate Group
	45th Canadian Parliament; Elected 2025; 1 session	May 26, 2025 – present	Liberal Party: Mark Carney—30th Ministry	169 of 343 House seats (minority) 0 of 105 Senate seats	Conservative Party: Andrew Scheer; Pierre Poilievre	Bloc Québécois; Independent Senators Group; Progressive Senate Group
