= 31st Canadian Parliament =

1979 seating of the national legislature of the North American country

- Minority parliament
- Oct. 9, 1979 – Dec. 14, 1979

Parliament leaders
- Prime minister: Rt. Hon. Joe Clark; Jun. 4, 1979 – Mar. 3, 1980
- Cabinet: 21st Canadian Ministry
- Leader of the Opposition: Rt. Hon. Pierre Trudeau; June 4, 1979 – March 2, 1980

Party caucuses
- Government: Progressive Conservative Party
- Opposition: Liberal Party
- Recognized: New Democratic Party
- Unrecognized: Social Credit Party

House of Commons
- Seating arrangements of the House of Commons
- Speaker of the Commons: Hon. James Jerome; September 30, 1974 – February 17, 1980
- Government House leader: Hon. Walter Baker; October 9, 1979 – December 14, 1979
- Opposition House leader: Hon. Allan MacEachen; October 9, 1979 – December 14, 1979
- Members: 282 MP seats List of members

Senate
- Seating arrangements of the Senate
- Speaker of the Senate: Hon. Allister Grosart; October 5, 1979 – March 3, 1980
- Government Senate leader: Hon. Jacques Flynn; June 4, 1979 – March 2, 1980
- Opposition Senate leader: Hon. Ray Perrault; May 22, 1979–December 31, 1979
- Senators: 104 senator seats List of senators

Sovereign
- Monarch: Elizabeth II; 6 February 1952 – 8 September 2022
- Governor general: Edward Schreyer; 22 January 1979 – 14 May 1984

Sessions
- 1st session October 9, 1979 – December 14, 1979
← 30th	→ 32nd

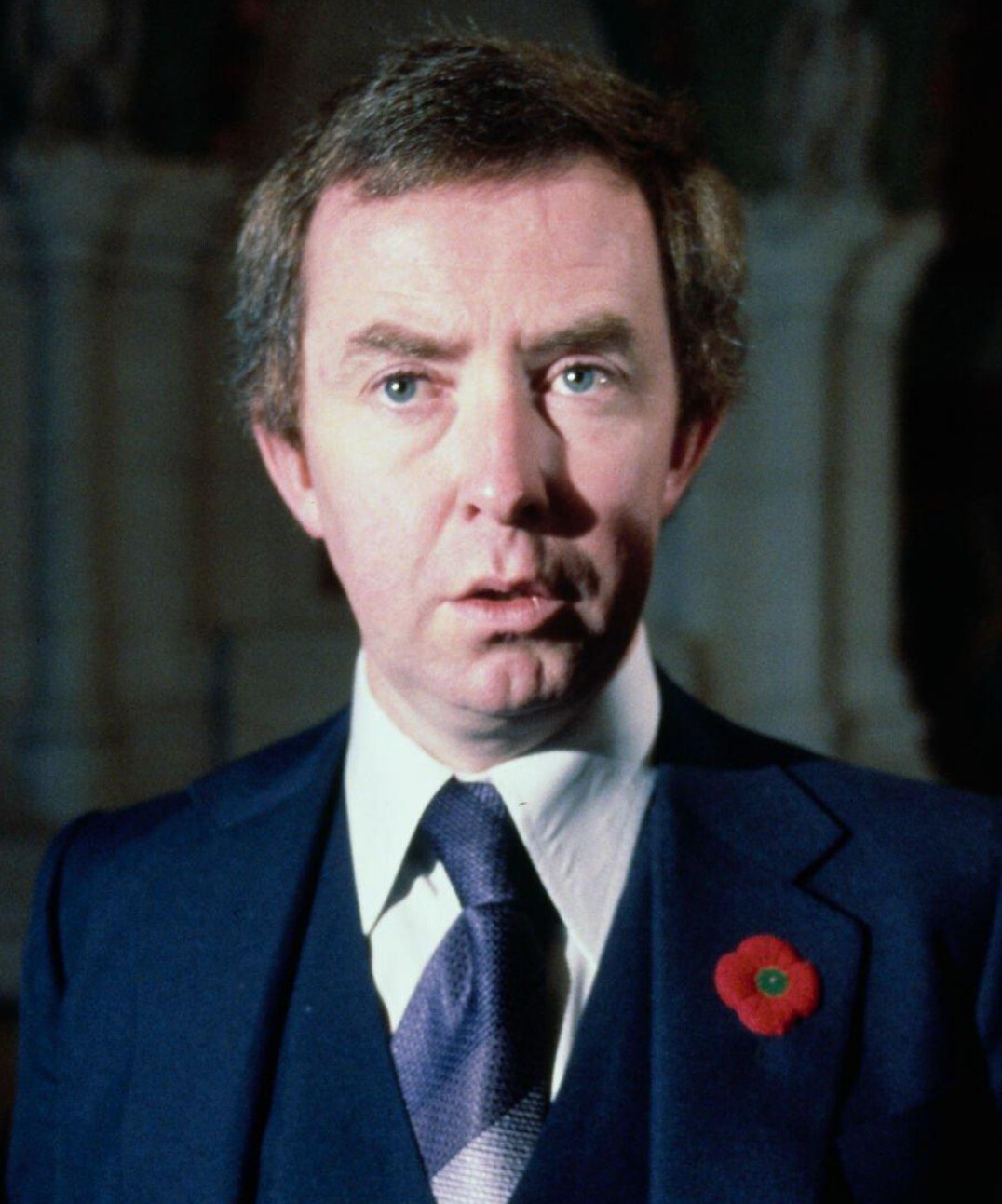
Joe Clark (pictured here in 1979) was Prime Minister during the 31st Canadian Parliament.

The 31st Canadian Parliament was a briefly lived parliament in session from October 9 until December 14, 1979. The membership was set by the 1979 federal election on May 22, 1979, and it was dissolved after the minority government of Joe Clark failed to pass a Motion of Confidence on December 13, 1979. The dissolution of parliament led to the 1980 federal election.

There was only one session of the 31st Parliament:

Session	Start	End
1st	October 9, 1979	December 14, 1979

== Overview ==
The 31st Parliament was controlled by a Progressive Conservative Party minority led by Prime Minister Joe Clark and the 21st Canadian Ministry. The Official Opposition was the Liberal Party, led by former prime minister Pierre Trudeau.

Lasting only 66 days from first sitting to dissolution, and only nine months from election to election, the 31st was the shortest parliament in Canadian history.

== Party standings ==
The party standings as of the election and as of dissolution were as follows:

Affiliation	House members		Senate members	
Affiliation	1979 election results	At dissolution	On election day 1979	At dissolution
Progressive Conservative	136	136	18	28
Liberal	114	114	73	71
New Democratic	26	27	0	0
Social Credit	6	5	1	1
Independent	0	0	2	2
Independent Liberal	0	0	1	1
Total members	282	282	92	103
Vacant	0	0	9	1
Total seats	282		104	

== Major events ==
=== Canadian embassy in Israel ===
Prior to his election, Clark promised to move Canada's embassy in Israel from Tel Aviv to Jerusalem. This was a contentious choice for both economic and security reasons. Following pushback from his cabinet, Clark recanted his promise.

=== The accidental collapse of the Clark government ===
On December 14th, 1979, while the Clark government was attempting to pass a budget, a confidence vote on a sub-amendment proposed by Bob Rae failed, leading to the dissolution of the government.

In the days leading up to this event, a number of Progressive Conservatives were away from the legislature, and the Clark government was not expecting the opposition parties to show up in full force.

Clark had been relying on the Social Credit party's MPs to keep the government afloat, assuming that they would not be interested in another election. They, however, abstained from the vote. With their abstention and the absence of several PC MPs, the final tally of the vote was 139 to 133 and the government fell.

=== The end of the Social Credit party ===
The Social Credit party's popularity had been dwindling over the last few elections, and the 31st parliament was the last in which they held seats federally. The party would, however, hold power in British Columbia until their loss in the 1991 British Columbia election.

== Ministry ==
The 21st Canadian Ministry lasted for the entirety of the 31st Canadian Parliament.

== Officeholders ==
=== Head of State ===
Office	Photo	Name	Assumed office	Left office
Sovereign		Elizabeth II	February 6, 1952	September 8, 2022
Governor General		Edward Schreyer	January 22, 1979	May 14,1984

=== Party leadership ===
Party	Photo	Name	Assumed Office	Left Office
Progressive Conservative		Joe Clark	November 20, 1976	June 3, 1979
Liberal		Pierre Trudeau	April 6, 1968	June 16, 1984
New Democratic		Ed Broadbent	July 7, 1975	December 5, 1989
Social Credit		Fabien Roy	1979	1980

=== House of Commons ===
==== Presiding officer ====
Office	Officer	Riding	From	To	Party
Speaker of the House of Commons	James Jerome	Sudbury	September 30, 1974	February 17, 1980	Liberal

==== Government leadership (Progressive Conservative) ====
Office	Officer	Riding	From	To
Prime Minister	Joe Clark	Mount Royal	November 20, 1976	June 3, 1979
Speaker of the House of Commons	Walter Baker	Grenville—Carleton	October 9, 197	December 14, 1979
Whip	Bill Kempling	Burlington	1980	1980

== Changes to party standings ==
=== By-elections ===
By-election	Date	Incumbent	Party	Winner	Party	Cause	Retained
Prince Albert	November 19, 1979	John Diefenbaker	Progressive Conservative	Stan Hovdebo	New Democratic	Death (heart attack)	No
Burin—St. George's	September 19, 1979	Don Jamieson	Liberal	Roger Simmons	Liberal	Resignation	Yes

== Parliamentarians ==
=== House of Commons ===
Members of the House of Commons in the 31st parliament arranged by province.

Key:

- Party leaders are italicized.
- Parliamentary secretaries is indicated by "‡".
- Cabinet ministers are in **boldface**.
- The Prime Minister is **both**.
- The Speaker is indicated by "(†)".

==== Alberta ====
Riding	Member	Political party	First elected / previously elected	No. of terms
Athabasca	Paul Yewchuk	Progressive Conservative	1968	4th term
Bow River	Gordon Taylor	Progressive Conservative	1979	1st term
Calgary Centre	Harvie Andre	Progressive Conservative	1972	3rd term
Calgary East	John Kushner	Progressive Conservative	1979	1st term
Calgary North	Eldon Woolliams	Progressive Conservative	1958	8th term
Calgary South	John Thomson	Progressive Conservative	1979	1st term
Calgary West	Jim Hawkes	Progressive Conservative	1979	1st term
Crowfoot	Arnold Malone	Progressive Conservative	1974	2nd term
Edmonton East	William Yurko	Progressive Conservative	1979	1st term
Edmonton North	**Steve Paproski**	Progressive Conservative	1968	4th term
Edmonton South	Douglas Roche ‡	Progressive Conservative	1972	3rd term
Edmonton West	Marcel Lambert	Progressive Conservative	1957	9th term
Edmonton—Strathcona	David Kilgour ‡	Progressive Conservative	1979	1st term
Lethbridge—Foothills	Blaine Thacker	Progressive Conservative	1979	1st term
Medicine Hat	Bert Hargrave ‡	Progressive Conservative	1972	3rd term
Peace River	Ged Baldwin	Progressive Conservative	1958	8th term
Pembina	Peter Elzinga	Progressive Conservative	1974	2nd term
Red Deer	Gordon Towers	Progressive Conservative	1972	3rd term
Vegreville	**Don Mazankowski**	Progressive Conservative	1968	4th term
Wetaskiwin	Kenneth Schellenberger ‡	Progressive Conservative	1972	3rd term
Yellowhead	**Joe Clark**	Progressive Conservative	1972	3rd term

==== British Columbia ====
Riding	Member	Political party	First elected / previously elected	No. of terms
Burnaby	Svend Robinson	New Democrat	1979	1st term
Capilano	**Ron Huntington**	Progressive Conservative	1974	2nd term
Cariboo—Chilcotin	Lorne Greenaway	Progressive Conservative	1979	1st term
Comox—Powell River	Ray Skelly	New Democrat	1979	1st term
Cowichan—Malahat—The Islands	Don L. Taylor	Progressive Conservative	1979	1st term
Esquimalt—Saanich	Donald Munro	Progressive Conservative	1972	3rd term
Fraser Valley East	Alexander Patterson	Progressive Conservative	1953, (Note: First elected as a Social Credit) 1962, (Note: Re-elected as a Social Credit) 1972	8th term*
Fraser Valley West	Robert Wenman	Progressive Conservative	1974	2nd term
Kamloops—Shuswap	Don Cameron	Progressive Conservative	1979	1st term
Kootenay East—Revelstoke	Stan Graham	Progressive Conservative	1979	1st term
Kootenay West	Robert Brisco	Progressive Conservative	1974	2nd term
Mission—Port Moody	Mark Rose	New Democrat	1968, (Note: Fraser Valley West) 1979	3rd term*
Nanaimo—Alberni	Edward Miller	New Democrat	1979	1st term
New Westminster—Coquitlam	Pauline Jewett	New Democrat	1963, (Note: Northumberland (Ontario) (First elected as a Liberal)) 1979	2nd term*
North Vancouver—Burnaby	Chuck Cook	Progressive Conservative	1979	1st term
Okanagan North	George Whittaker	Progressive Conservative	1972	3rd term
Okanagan—Similkameen	Frederick King	Progressive Conservative	1979	1st term
Prince George—Bulkley Valley	Robert McCuish	Progressive Conservative	1979	1st term
Prince George—Peace River	Frank Oberle Sr.	Progressive Conservative	1972	3rd term
Richmond—South Delta	Tom Siddon ‡	Progressive Conservative	1978	2nd term
Skeena	James Fulton	New Democrat	1979	1st term
Surrey—White Rock—North Delta	Benno Friesen	Progressive Conservative	1974	2nd term
Vancouver Centre	Arthur Phillips	Liberal	1979	1st term
Vancouver East	Margaret Mitchell	New Democrat	1979	1st term
Vancouver Kingsway	Ian Waddell	New Democrat	1979	1st term
Vancouver Quadra	Bill Clarke	Progressive Conservative	1972	3rd term
Vancouver South	**John Allen Fraser**	Progressive Conservative	1972	3rd term
Victoria	**Allan McKinnon**	Progressive Conservative	1972	3rd term

==== Manitoba ====
Riding	Member	Political party	First elected / previously elected	No. of terms
Brandon—Souris	Walter Dinsdale	Progressive Conservative	1951	11th term
Churchill	Rodney Murphy	New Democrat	1979	1st term
Dauphin	Gordon Ritchie	Progressive Conservative	1968	4th term
Lisgar	Jack Murta ‡	Progressive Conservative	1970	4th term
Portage—Marquette	Charles Mayer	Progressive Conservative	1979	1st term
Provencher	**Jake Epp**	Progressive Conservative	1972	3rd term
Selkirk—Interlake	Terry Sargeant	New Democrat	1979	1st term
St. Boniface	Robert Bockstael	Liberal	1979	1st term
Winnipeg North	David Orlikow	New Democrat	1962	7th term
Winnipeg North Centre	Stanley Knowles	New Democrat	1942, 1962	12th term*
Winnipeg—Assiniboine	Dan McKenzie ‡	Progressive Conservative	1972	3rd term
Winnipeg—Birds Hill	Bill Blaikie	New Democrat	1979	1st term
Winnipeg—Fort Garry	Lloyd Axworthy	Liberal	1979	1st term
Winnipeg—St. James	Bob Lane	Progressive Conservative	1979	1st term

==== New Brunswick ====
Riding	Member	Political party	First elected / previously elected	No. of terms
Carleton—Charlotte	Fred McCain	Progressive Conservative	1972	3rd term
Fundy—Royal	Robert Corbett	Progressive Conservative	1978	2nd term
Gloucester	Herb Breau	Liberal	1968	4th term
Madawaska—Victoria	Eymard Corbin	Liberal	1968	4th term
Moncton	Gary McCauley	Liberal	1979	1st term
Northumberland—Miramichi	Maurice Dionne	Liberal	1974	2nd term
Restigouche	Maurice Harquail	Liberal	1975	2nd term
Saint John	Eric Ferguson	Progressive Conservative	1979	1st term
Westmorland—Kent	Roméo LeBlanc	Liberal	1972	3rd term
York—Sunbury	**J. Robert Howie**	Progressive Conservative	1972	3rd term

==== Newfoundland ====
Riding	Member	Political party	First elected / previously elected	No. of terms
Bonavista—Trinity—Conception	Dave Rooney	Liberal	1972	3rd term
Burin—St. George's	Donald Jamieson	Liberal	1966	5th term
Burin—St. George's	Roger Simmons (1979)*	Liberal	1979	1st term
Gander—Twillingate	George Baker	Liberal	1974	2nd term
Grand Falls—White Bay—Labrador	Bill Rompkey	Liberal	1972	3rd term
Humber—Port au Port—St. Barbe	Fonse Faour	New Democrat	1978	2nd term
St. John's East	**James McGrath**	Progressive Conservative	1957, 1968	7th term*
St. John's West	**John Crosbie**	Progressive Conservative	1976	2nd term

* Donald Jamieson resigned from parliament and was replaced by Roger Simmons in a September 19, 1979, by-election

==== Nova Scotia ====
Riding	Member	Political party	First elected / previously elected	No. of terms
Annapolis Valley—Hants	Pat Nowlan	Progressive Conservative	1965	5th term
Cape Breton Highlands—Canso	Allan MacEachen	Liberal	1953, 1962	9th term*
Cape Breton—East Richmond	Andrew Hogan	New Democrat	1974	2nd term
Cape Breton—The Sydneys	Russell MacLellan	Liberal	1979	1st term
Central Nova	**Elmer MacKay**	Progressive Conservative	1971	4th term
Cumberland—Colchester	Robert Coates	Progressive Conservative	1957	9th term
Dartmouth—Halifax East	Michael Forrestall	Progressive Conservative	1965	5th term
Halifax	George Cooper ‡	Progressive Conservative	1979	1st term
Halifax West	Howard Crosby	Progressive Conservative	1978	2nd term
South Shore	Lloyd Crouse	Progressive Conservative	1957	9th term
South Western Nova	Charles Haliburton	Progressive Conservative	1972, 1979	2nd term*

==== Prince Edward Island ====
Riding	Member	Political party	First elected / previously elected	No. of terms
Cardigan	Wilbur MacDonald	Progressive Conservative	1979	1st term
Egmont	**David MacDonald**	Progressive Conservative	1965	5th term
Hillsborough	Thomas McMillan	Progressive Conservative	1979	1st term
Malpeque	Melbourne Gass	Progressive Conservative	1979	1st term

==== Ontario ====
Riding	Member	Political party	First elected / previously elected	No. of terms
Algoma	Maurice Foster	Liberal	1968	4th term
Beaches	Robin Richardson	Progressive Conservative	1979	1st term
Brampton—Georgetown	John McDermid	Progressive Conservative	1979	1st term
Brant	Derek Blackburn	New Democrat	1971	4th term
Broadview—Greenwood	Bob Rae	New Democrat	1978	2nd term
Bruce—Grey	Gary Gurbin ‡	Progressive Conservative	1979	1st term
Burlington	Bill Kempling	Progressive Conservative	1972	3rd term
Cambridge	Chris Speyer ‡	Progressive Conservative	1979	1st term
Cochrane	Keith Penner	Liberal	1968	4th term
Davenport	Charles Caccia	Liberal	1968	4th term
Don Valley East	Sam Wakim	Progressive Conservative	1979	1st term
Don Valley West	John Bosley ‡	Progressive Conservative	1979	1st term
Durham—Northumberland	**Allan Lawrence**	Progressive Conservative	1972	3rd term
Eglinton—Lawrence	Roland de Corneille	Liberal	1979	1st term
Elgin	**John Wise**	Progressive Conservative	1972	3rd term
Erie	Girve Fretz	Progressive Conservative	1979	1st term
Essex—Kent	Robert Daudlin	Liberal	1974	2nd term
Essex—Windsor	Eugene Whelan	Liberal	1962	7th term
Etobicoke Centre	**Michael Wilson**	Progressive Conservative	1979	1st term
Etobicoke North	Roy MacLaren	Liberal	1979	1st term
Etobicoke—Lakeshore	Ken Robinson	Liberal	1968, 1974	3rd term*
Glengarry—Prescott—Russell	Denis Éthier	Liberal	1972	3rd term
Grey—Simcoe	Gus Mitges	Progressive Conservative	1972	3rd term
Guelph	Albert Fish	Progressive Conservative	1979	1st term
Haldimand—Norfolk	Bud Bradley	Progressive Conservative	1979	1st term
Halton	Otto Jelinek ‡	Progressive Conservative	1972	3rd term
Hamilton East	John Munro	Liberal	1962	7th term
Hamilton Mountain	Duncan Beattie	Progressive Conservative	1972, 1979	2nd term*
Hamilton—Wentworth	Geoffrey Scott	Progressive Conservative	1978	2nd term
Hamilton West	**Lincoln Alexander**	Progressive Conservative	1968	4th term
Hastings—Frontenac	Bill Vankoughnet	Progressive Conservative	1979	1st term
Huron—Bruce	Robert McKinley	Progressive Conservative	1965	5th term
Kenora—Rainy River	John Mercer Reid	Liberal	1965	5th term
Kent	John Holmes ‡	Progressive Conservative	1972	3rd term
Kingston and the Islands	**Flora MacDonald**	Progressive Conservative	1972	3rd term
Kitchener	John Reimer	Progressive Conservative	1979	1st term
Lambton—Middlesex	Sidney Fraleigh	Progressive Conservative	1979	1st term
Lanark—Renfrew—Carleton	Paul Dick	Progressive Conservative	1972	3rd term
Leeds—Grenville	Thomas Cossitt	Progressive Conservative	1972	3rd term
Lincoln	Kenneth Higson	Progressive Conservative	1972, 1979	2nd term*
London East	Charles Turner	Liberal	1968	4th term
London West	Judd Buchanan	Liberal	1968	4th term
London—Middlesex	Nelson Elliott	Progressive Conservative	1979	1st term
Mississauga North	Alex Jupp	Progressive Conservative	1979	1st term
Mississauga South	Don Blenkarn	Progressive Conservative	1972, 1979	2nd term*
Nepean—Carleton	**Walter Baker**	Progressive Conservative	1972	3rd term
Niagara Falls	Jake Froese	Progressive Conservative	1979	1st term
Nickel Belt	John Rodriguez	New Democrat	1972	3rd term
Nipissing	Jean-Jacques Blais	Liberal	1972	3rd term
Northumberland	George Hees	Progressive Conservative	1950, (Note: Broadview) 1965	10th term*
Ontario	Thomas Fennell ‡	Progressive Conservative	1979	1st term
Oshawa	Ed Broadbent	New Democrat	1968	4th term
Ottawa—Carleton	Jean-Luc Pépin	Liberal	1963, (Note: Drummond—Arthabaska/Drummond (Quebec)) 1979	4th term*
Ottawa Centre	John Evans	Liberal	1979	1st term
Ottawa West	Kenneth Binks	Progressive Conservative	1979	1st term
Ottawa—Vanier	Jean-Robert Gauthier	Liberal	1972	3rd term
Oxford	Bruce Halliday	Progressive Conservative	1974	2nd term
Parkdale—High Park	Jesse Flis	Liberal	1979	1st term
Parry Sound-Muskoka	Stan Darling	Progressive Conservative	1972	3rd term
Perth	**William Jarvis**	Progressive Conservative	1972	3rd term
Peterborough	Bill Domm	Progressive Conservative	1979	1st term
Prince Edward—Hastings	Jack Ellis	Progressive Conservative	1972	3rd term
Renfrew—Nipissing—Pembroke	Len Hopkins	Liberal	1965	5th term
Rosedale	**David Crombie**	Progressive Conservative	1978	2nd term
Sarnia	Bill Campbell	Progressive Conservative	1979	1st term
Sault Ste. Marie	Cyril Symes	New Democrat	1972	3rd term
Scarborough Centre	Diane Stratas ‡	Progressive Conservative	1979	1st term
Scarborough East	Gordon Gilchrist	Progressive Conservative	1979	1st term
Scarborough West	William Wightman ‡	Progressive Conservative	1979	1st term
Simcoe North	Doug Lewis ‡	Progressive Conservative	1979	1st term
Simcoe South	Ronald Stewart	Progressive Conservative	1979	1st term
Spadina	Peter Stollery	Liberal	1972	3rd term
St. Catharines	Joseph Reid ‡	Progressive Conservative	1979	1st term
St. Paul's	**Ron Atkey**	Progressive Conservative	1972, 1979	2nd term*
Stormont—Dundas	Ed Lumley	Liberal	1974	2nd term
Sudbury	James Jerome (†)	Liberal	1968	4th term
Thunder Bay—Atikokan	Paul McRae	Liberal	1972	3rd term
Thunder Bay—Nipigon	Bob Andras	Liberal	1965	5th term
Timiskaming	Arnold Peters	New Democrat	1957	9th term
Timmins—Chapleau	Ray Chénier	Liberal	1979	1st term
Trinity	Aideen Nicholson	Liberal	1974	2nd term
Victoria—Haliburton	William C. Scott	Progressive Conservative	1965	5th term
Waterloo	Walter McLean	Progressive Conservative	1979	1st term
Welland	Gilbert Parent	Liberal	1974	2nd term
Wellington—Dufferin—Simcoe	**Perrin Beatty**	Progressive Conservative	1972	3rd term
Willowdale	Bob Jarvis ‡	Progressive Conservative	1979	1st term
Windsor West	Herb Gray	Liberal	1962	7th term
Windsor—Walkerville	Mark MacGuigan	Liberal	1968	4th term
York Centre	Bob Kaplan	Liberal	1968, (Note: Don Valley) 1974	3rd term*
York East	Ron Ritchie	Progressive Conservative	1979	1st term
York North	John Gamble	Progressive Conservative	1979	1st term
York—Scarborough	Paul McCrossan	Progressive Conservative	1978	2nd term
York South—Weston	Ursula Appolloni	Liberal	1974	2nd term
York—Peel	**Sinclair Stevens**	Progressive Conservative	1972	3rd term
York West	James Fleming	Liberal	1972	3rd term

==== Quebec ====
Riding	Member	Political party	First elected / previously elected	No. of terms
Abitibi	Armand Caouette	Social Credit	1974	2nd term
Argenteuil	Robert Gourd	Liberal	1979	1st term
Beauce	Fabien Roy	Social Credit	1979	1st term
Beauharnois—Salaberry	Gérald Laniel	Liberal	1962	7th term
Bellechasse	Joseph Lambert	Social Credit	1968	4th term
Berthier—Maskinongé	Antonio Yanakis	Liberal	1965	5th term
Blainville—Deux-Montagnes	Francis Fox	Liberal	1972	3rd term
Bonaventure—Îles-de-la-Madeleine	Rémi Bujold	Liberal	1979	1st term
Bourassa	Carlo Rossi	Liberal	1979	1st term
Chambly	Raymond Dupont	Liberal	1972	3rd term
Champlain	Michel Veillette	Liberal	1979	1st term
Charlesbourg	Pierre Bussières	Liberal	1974	2nd term
Charlevoix	Charles Lapointe	Liberal	1974	2nd term
Châteauguay	Ian Watson	Liberal	1963	6th term
Chicoutimi	Marcel Dionne	Liberal	1979	1st term
Dollard	Louis Desmarais	Liberal	1979	1st term
Drummond	Yvon Pinard	Liberal	1974	2nd term
Duvernay	Yves Demers	Liberal	1972	3rd term
Frontenac	Léopold Corriveau	Liberal	1970	4th term
Gamelin	Arthur Portelance	Liberal	1968	4th term
Gaspé	Alexandre Cyr	Liberal	1963, 1968	5th term*
Gatineau	René Cousineau	Liberal	1979	1st term
Hochelaga—Maisonneuve	Serge Joyal	Liberal	1974	2nd term
Hull	Gaston Isabelle	Liberal	1965	5th term
Joliette	**Roch La Salle**	Progressive Conservative	1968	4th term
Jonquière	Gilles Marceau	Liberal	1968	4th term
Kamouraska—Rivière-du-Loup	Rosaire Gendron	Liberal	1963	6th term
Labelle	Maurice Dupras	Liberal	1970	4th term
Lac-Saint-Jean	Marcel Lessard	Liberal	1962, 1968	6th term*
Lachine	Roderick Blaker	Liberal	1972	3rd term
Langelier	Gilles Lamontagne	Liberal	1977	2nd term
La Prairie	Pierre Deniger	Liberal	1979	1st term
Lasalle	John Campbell	Liberal	1972	3rd term
Laurier	David Berger	Liberal	1979	1st term
Laval	Marcel-Claude Roy	Liberal	1968	4th term
Laval-des-Rapides	Jeanne Sauvé	Liberal	1972	3rd term
Lévis	Raynald Guay	Liberal	1963	6th term
Longueuil	Jacques Olivier	Liberal	1972	3rd term
Lotbiniere	Richard Janelle ‡*	Social Credit	1978	2nd term
Lotbiniere	Richard Janelle ‡*	Independent	1978	2nd term
Lotbiniere	Richard Janelle ‡*	Progressive Conservative	1978	2nd term
Louis-Hébert	Dennis Dawson	Liberal	1977	2nd term
Manicouagan	André Maltais	Liberal	1979	1st term
Matapédia—Matane	Pierre de Bané	Liberal	1968	4th term
Mégantic—Compton—Stanstead	Claude Tessier	Liberal	1974	2nd term
Mercier	Céline Hervieux-Payette	Liberal	1979	1st term
Missisquoi	**Heward Grafftey**	Progressive Conservative	1958, 1972	7th term*
Montmorency	Louis Duclos	Liberal	1974	2nd term
Mount Royal	Pierre Trudeau	Liberal	1965	5th term
Notre-Dame-de-Grâce	Warren Allmand	Liberal	1965	5th term
Outremont	Marc Lalonde	Liberal	1972	3rd term
Papineau	André Ouellet	Liberal	1967	5th term
Pontiac—Gatineau—Labelle	Thomas Lefebvre	Liberal	1965	5th term
Portneuf	Rolland Dion	Liberal	1979	1st term
Québec-Est	Gérard Duquet	Liberal	1965	5th term
Richelieu	Jean-Louis Leduc	Liberal	1979	1st term
Richmond	Alain Tardif	Liberal	1979	1st term
Rimouski	Eudore Allard	Social Credit	1972	3rd term
Roberval	Charles-Arthur Gauthier	Social Credit	1962	7th term
Rosemont	Claude-André Lachance	Liberal	1974	2nd term
Saint-Denis	Marcel Prud'homme	Liberal	1964	6th term
Saint-Henri—Westmount	Donald Johnston	Liberal	1978	2nd term
Saint-Hyacinthe	Marcel Ostiguy	Liberal	1978	2nd term
Saint-Jacques	Jacques Guilbault	Liberal	1968	4th term
Saint-Jean	Paul-André Massé	Liberal	1979	1st term
Saint-Léonard—Anjou	Monique Bégin	Liberal	1972	3rd term
Saint-Maurice	Jean Chrétien	Liberal	1963	6th term
Saint-Michel	Marie Thérèse Killens	Liberal	1979	1st term
Sainte-Marie	Jean-Claude Malépart	Liberal	1979	1st term
Shefford	Jean Lapierre	Liberal	1979	1st term
Sherbrooke	Irénée Pelletier	Liberal	1972	3rd term
Témiscamingue	Henri Tousignant	Liberal	1979	1st term
Terrebonne	Joseph-Roland Comtois	Liberal	1965	5th term
Trois-Rivières	Claude Lajoie	Liberal	1971	4th term
Vaudreuil	Hal Herbert	Liberal	1972	3rd term
Verchères	Bernard Loiselle	Liberal	1974	2nd term
Verdun	Pierre Savard	Liberal	1977	2nd term

* Richard Janelle left Social Credit Party sat as an independent MP from September 22, 1979 until he joined the Progressive Conservative caucus on October 9 of that year

==== Saskatchewan ====
Riding	Member	Political party	First elected / previously elected	No. of terms
Assiniboia	Lenard Gustafson	Progressive Conservative	1979	1st term
Humboldt—Lake Centre	George Richardson	Progressive Conservative	1979	1st term
Kindersley—Lloydminster	Bill McKnight	Progressive Conservative	1979	1st term
Mackenzie	Stanley Korchinski	Progressive Conservative	1958	8th term
Moose Jaw	Douglas Neil	Progressive Conservative	1972	3rd term
Prince Albert	John Diefenbaker*	Progressive Conservative	1940	13th term
Prince Albert	Stan Hovdebo (1979)	New Democrat	1979	1st term
Qu'Appelle—Moose Mountain	Alvin Hamilton	Progressive Conservative	1957, (Note: Qu'Appelle) 1972	8th term*
Regina East	Simon De Jong	New Democrat	1979	1st term
Regina West	Les Benjamin	New Democrat	1968	4th term
Saskatoon East	Robert Ogle	New Democrat	1979	1st term
Saskatoon West	**Ray Hnatyshyn**	Progressive Conservative	1974	2nd term
Swift Current—Maple Creek	Frank Hamilton	Progressive Conservative	1972	3rd term
The Battlefords—Meadow Lake	Terry Nylander	Progressive Conservative	1979	1st term
Yorkton—Melville	Lorne Nystrom	New Democrat	1968	4th term

*John Diefenbaker died on August 16, 1979; Stan Hovdebo won the following November 19th by-election to fill his seat

==== Territories ====
Riding	Member	Political party	First elected / previously elected	No. of terms
Nunatsiaq	Peter Ittinuar	New Democrat	1979	1st term
Western Arctic	Dave Nickerson	Progressive Conservative	1979	1st term
Yukon	**Erik Nielsen**	Progressive Conservative	1957	9th term

== Committees ==
=== House ===
==== Standing ====
- Standing Committee on Agriculture
- Standing Committee on Broadcasting, Films and Assistance to the Arts
- Standing Committee on Communications and Culture
- Standing Committee on External Affairs and National Defence
- Standing Committee on Finance, Trade and Economic Affairs
- Standing Committee on Fisheries and Forestry
- Standing Committee on Health, Welfare and Social Affairs
- Standing Committee on Indian Affairs and Northern Development
- Standing Committee on Justice and Legal Affairs
- Standing Committee on Labour, Manpower and Immigration
- Standing Committee on Management and Members' Services
- Standing Committee on Miscellaneous Estimates
- Standing Committee on National Resources and Public Works
- Standing Committee on Northern Pipelines
- Standing Committee on Privileges and Elections
- Standing Committee on Public Accounts
- Standing Committee on Regional Development
- Standing Committee on Transport and Communications
- Standing Committee on Transport and Communications
- Standing Committee on Veterans Affairs

=== Senate ===
==== Standing ====
- Standing Committee on Agriculture
- Standing Committee on Banking, Trade and Commerce
- Standing Committee on Foreign Affairs
- Standing Committee on Legal and Constitutional Affairs
- Standing Committee on National Finance
- Standing Committee on Transport and Communications

==== Special ====
- Special Committee on the Northern Pipeline

=== Joint ===
==== Standing Joint Committees ====
- Standing Joint Committee on Regulations and other Statutory Instruments

== Legislation and motions ==
=== Act's which received royal assent under 31st Parliament ===
==== 1st Session ====
===== Public acts =====
Date of Assent	Index	Title	Bill Number
'November 20, 1979	1	Postal rates, An Act respecting certain	C-11
'November 20, 1979	2	Appropriation Act No. 1, 1979–80	C-23
'November 22, 1979	3	Borrowing Authority Act, 1979–80	C-10
'November 29, 1979	4	Old Age Security Act, An Act to amend the	C-6
'December 6, 1979	5	Income Tax Act and to amend the Canada Pension Plan, An Act to amend the statute law relating to	C-17
'December 6, 1979	6	Customs Tariff and to make certain amendments to the New Zealand Trade Agreement Act, 1932, the Australian Trade Agreement Act, 1960 and the Union of South Africa Trade Agreement Act, 1932, An Act to amend the	C-18
'December 6, 1979	7	Federal District Commission to have acquired certain lands, An Act to confirm the authority of the	S-10
