= William Craig McNamara =

Canadian politician

William Craig McNamara (August 8, 1904 – April 12, 1984) was chief commissioner of the Canadian Wheat Board from 1958 to 1970 and then a member of the Senate of Canada.

He was born in Winnipeg, Manitoba but raised in Regina, Saskatchewan and was called "Bill Mac" by his friends. He was instrumental in opening overseas markets to Canadian wheat. In the 1960s, he led delegations to the Soviet Union and the People's Republic of China to negotiate wheat sales to those countries.

In 1923, McNamara found work with the Standard Bank of Canada but left in 1924 to become an office boy with the Saskatchewan Wheat Pool.

He joined the Canadian Wheat Board in 1942 and was appointed commissioner in 1955 becoming assistant chief commissioner in 1947 and then chief commissioner in 1958. He held that position until 1970 when he was appointed to the Senate where he sat as a Liberal representing Manitoba. He retired from the upper house in 1979.

McNamara was known as a tough and stubborn trader in the wheat business. He built trading relationships abroad by visiting foreign customers and inviting them to visit Canada in return.

Under McNamara, wheat prices remained relatively stable, customers where guaranteed a fixed price for the life of the sale while the United States wished to sell its wheat on a sliding scale with the price fluctuating based on market demands. The difference in approach led to a complaint from the United States that Canada had pegged the world price of wheat.

McNamara argued that this policy kept prices stable and prevented the price from dropping sharply - the Wheat Board under his stewardship would also withhold wheat from the market when demand was soft in order to keep the price stable. "We are out to sell to the best advantage of the Canadian producer," he said. "This dominates our thinking; this is what we were created for."
