= James W. Ross =

Canadian politician (born 1938)

The Honourable James W. Ross

Senator for Maritimes Divisional, Maritimes (Division)
- In office 1990–1993
- Appointed by: Brian Mulroney

Personal details
- Born: September 6, 1938 (age 88) Hopetown, Quebec
- Party: Progressive Conservative

James W. Ross, CM (born September 6, 1938) is a Canadian businessman and former Canadian senator.

Ross was one of eight senators appointed directly by the Queen on the advice of Prime Minister Brian Mulroney under Section 26 of the Constitution Act, 1867 to pass the Goods and Services Tax. The measure faced defeat in the Liberal-dominated Senate. So, Mulroney utilized a previously unused constitutional provision that would allow him to temporarily expand the size of the upper house by a total of eight senators (two per region) in order to ensure he had enough votes to enact the GST into law.

A businessman by trade, Ross resigned from the Senate in May 1993, after only 972 days, to return to public life. At the age of 54, he was entitled to remain in the Senate for a further 21 years before being forced to retire.

Ross remains active in Fredericton, New Brunswick, as a philanthropist and businessman. In 1994, he founded Partners For Youth Inc., a non-profit organization built on a community partnership model that uses adventure-based counseling to help young people.

While most senators sit as representatives of a province or territory, Ross and the seven other senators appointed under Section 26 represented regions. Hence, Ross and Michael Forrestall sat as senators representing the Maritimes rather than a particular province.

In 1999, he was made a Member of the Order of Canada.
