= Paul Yuzyk =

Canadian politician

The Honourable Paul Yuzyk

Canadian Senator from Manitoba
- In office February 4, 1963 – July 9, 1986
- Appointed by: John Diefenbaker

Personal details
- Born: 24 June 1913 Pinto (near Estevan), Saskatchewan, Canada
- Died: July 9, 1986 (aged 73) Ottawa, Ontario, Canada
- Party: Conservative
- Spouse: Katherine Chaban (m. 1911)
- Children: 4
- Education: University of Saskatchewan (BA, MA); University of Manitoba (PhD)
- Occupation: Politician; author; historian; academic

Paul Yuzyk (Ukrainian: Павло Юзик, 24 June 1913 – 9 July 1986) was a Canadian politician, author, historian, and academic. He was appointed to the Senate of Canada on 4 February 1963 on the recommendation of John Diefenbaker. He sat as a member of the Progressive Conservative Party caucus until his death.

== Background ==
He was an associate professor of Slavic studies and professor of history at the University of Manitoba and a professor of Russian and Soviet history at the University of Ottawa. He was the author of several books including The Ukrainians in Manitoba: A Social History (1953), Ukrainian Canadians: Their Place and Role in Canadian Life (1967), and For a Better Canada (1974). He was co-editor, with William Darcovich, of the book A Statistical Compendium on the Ukrainians in Canada 1891-1976 (1980).

Yuzyk is remembered for being an early advocate of the concept of multiculturalism, which he first broached in a senate speech on March 3, 1963. In the speech he criticized the Lester Pearson government for consecrating "Biculturalism" in the Royal Commission on Bilingualism and Biculturalism, which Yuzyk said ignored the reality that Canada was in fact a "multicultural" society.

== The Paul Yuzyk Award for Multiculturalism ==
The Paul Yuzyk Award commemorates late Senator Yuzyk's "pioneering legacy establishing multiculturalism as one of the fundamental characteristics of Canadian identity."

In 2009, the Paul Yuzyk Award for Multiculturalism was created by the Government of Canada to "recognize individuals and groups in communities across Canada who have made exceptional contributions to multiculturalism and diversity." The award is presented annually for Lifetime Achievement or Outstanding Achievement. Candidates for the award must be nominated. The award recipient receives a certificate of honour and is asked to choose an eligible, non-profit organization to receive a $20,000 grant.

== Archives ==
There is a Paul Yuzyk fonds at Library and Archives Canada.
