= Irvine Barrow =

Canadian politician

The Honourable Augustus Irvine Barrow

Senator for Halifax-Dartmouth, Nova Scotia
- In office 1974–1988
- Appointed by: Pierre Trudeau

Personal details
- Born: February 15, 1913 Montreal, Quebec
- Died: March 17, 2005 (aged 92) Halifax, Nova Scotia
- Party: Liberal
- Committees: Chair, Standing Committee on Banking, Trade and Commerce (1983−1984)

Augustus Irvine Barrow (February 15, 1913 – March 17, 2005) was a Canadian chartered accountant and Senator.

He was born in Montreal, Quebec to Hartley F. Barrow and Margaret E. (Irvine). In 1918, at age five, his family moved to Halifax, Nova Scotia. He attended the Maritime Business College. After working as an accountant, he was admitted to the Institute of Chartered Accountants of Nova Scotia in 1939.

In 1946, he co-founded an accounting firm with J. C. Nicoll, which grew to have several branches in the Maritime provinces known as Barrow Nicoll & Company. He was President of the Nova Scotia Institute of Chartered Accountants and the Halifax Chamber of Commerce. He was also a Director of the Bank of Canada and the Industrial Development Bank.

He was a member of the Board of Governors of Dalhousie University and chairman of its budget committee. A Liberal supporter, he was President of both the Nova Scotia and the Halifax County Liberal Associations. He also chaired the 1962 and 1963's federal election campaigns for Prime Minister Lester B. Pearson.

In 1974, he was appointed by Pierre Trudeau to the Senate representing the senatorial division of Halifax-Dartmouth, Nova Scotia. He was Chairman of the Standing Senate Committee on Banking, Trade and Commerce and Deputy Chairman of the Standing Senate Committee on National Finance. He served until his retirement in 1988.

He died in Halifax, Nova Scotia in 2005.

== Legal issues ==
In the early 1980s, Barrow and two other individuals were charged with criminal offences in relation to fund-raising activities on behalf of the Nova Scotia Liberal Association. In May 1983, following a jury trial in the Nova Scotia Supreme Court, Barrow was found guilty and fined $25,000. He appealed to the Appellate Division of the Supreme Court of Nova Scotia, which dismissed the appeal in September 1984. He then appealed to the Supreme Court of Canada, which ruled that the jury selection process had been contrary to the requirements of the Criminal Code. The Supreme Court ordered a new trial. At the new trial, Barrow was acquitted.
