= Yvette Boucher Rousseau =

Canadian politician

The Honourable Yvette Boucher Rousseau

Senator for De Salaberry, Quebec
- In office March 27, 1979 – March 17, 1988
- Appointed by: Pierre Trudeau
- Preceded by: Léon Mercier Gouin
- Succeeded by: Jean-Marie Poitras

Personal details
- Born: February 18, 1917 St-Eleuthère, Quebec
- Died: March 17, 1988 (aged 71)
- Party: Liberal

Yvette Boucher Rousseau (February 18, 1917 – March 17, 1988) was a Quebec trade unionist, feminist and member of the Senate of Canada.

She was born in Saint-Éleuthère, Quebec and worked as a farmer and teacher.

Rousseau interrupted her teaching career to raise her children. She returned to the workforce in 1952 as a production supervisor in a textile factory and became active in her union becoming a director on the executive committee of Sherbrooke, Quebec's labour council and then vice-president of the Canadian Federation of Textile Workers and vice-president of the Confédération des syndicats nationaux (CSN), one of Quebec's principal trade union federations.

She served as a CSN delegate on the Economic Council of Canada, the Royal Commission on the Status of Women and the Third World Conference on Work held in Brussels.

From 1970 to 1973 she was president of the Fédération des femmes du Québec and from 1973 to 1976 was vice-president of the Consultative Council of the Status of Women and then served as president.

In 1979, she was appointed to the Senate of Canada by Pierre Elliott Trudeau. Rousseau served in the Senate until her death in 1988.
