= Paul Lafond =

Canadian politician (1919–1988)

The Honourable Paul Lafond

Senator for Gulf
- In office October 7, 1970 – May 27, 1988
- Appointed by: Pierre Trudeau
- Preceded by: Charles Gavan Power
- Succeeded by: Roch Bolduc

Personal details
- Born: July 12, 1919 Hull, Quebec, Canada
- Died: May 27, 1988 (aged 68)
- Party: Liberal
- Occupation: Administrator

Paul C. Lafond (July 12, 1919 – May 27, 1988) was a Canadian politician.

Born in Hull, Quebec (now Gatineau, Quebec), he served with the Royal Canadian Air Force as an officer during World War II. He was awarded the Distinguished Flying Cross in 1944 for his part in sinking a German submarine in the Atlantic. After the war, he was executive secretary of the Liberal Party of Canada and worked for the Liberal Federation of Canada from 1948 to 1968.

He was summoned to the Senate of Canada on the advice of Pierre Trudeau representing the senatorial division of Gulf, Quebec in 1970. He was chairman of the Special Senate Committee on National Defence.

He died in office in 1988.
