= Louis Giguère =

Canadian politician

The Honourable Louis Giguère

Senator for De la Durantaye, Quebec
- In office September 10, 1968 – December 18, 1986
- Appointed by: Pierre Trudeau
- Preceded by: Jean-François Pouliot
- Succeeded by: Jean Bazin

Personal details
- Born: Louis de Gonzague Giguère; December 18, 1911 Hébertville, Quebec, Canada
- Died: June 16, 2002 (aged 90)
- Resting place: Notre Dame des Neiges Cemetery
- Party: Liberal

Louis de Gonzague Giguère (December 18, 1911 – June 16, 2002) was a Canadian Senator and a figure in the "Sky Shops" scandal of the 1970s.

He was born in Hébertville in the Lac-Saint-Jean-Est region and studied law and political science at the Laval University and subsequently served as secretary to Quebec's minister of labour.

Giguère had been the main fundraiser for the Liberals in Quebec since 1962. In 1965, he helped convince the Liberal riding association in Mount Royal to nominate Pierre Trudeau as its candidate for election. In 1968, upon becoming Prime Minister of Canada, Trudeau made Giguère his first appointee to the Senate of Canada.

In 1976, he was accused of having made a $92,000 windfall profit in the "Sky Shops" scandal through the timely purchase and sales of shares in Sky Shops Ltd., allegedly profiting from influence peddling to reverse a 1972 government decision not to renew its concession to operate duty-free shops at Montreal's airports renewed in 1972. It was also alleged that two Montreal businessmen involved with Sky Shops, one of whom was National Hockey League president Clarence Campbell, had offered Giguère the money in exchange for his assistance in lobbying government officials to overturn the decision to end the concession. Giguère and the two men were charged with conspiring to accept a benefit. While the two businessmen were convicted of bribing Giguère and fined, he himself was acquitted in a separate trial due to a lack of incriminating evidence.

Giguère retired from the Senate in 1986 upon reaching the mandatory retirement age of 75. After his death in 2002, he was entombed at the Notre Dame des Neiges Cemetery in Montreal.
