= John Morrow Godfrey =

Canadian politician

The Honourable John Morrow Godfrey

Canadian Senator from Ontario
- In office 1973–1987
- Appointed by: Pierre Trudeau

Personal details
- Born: June 28, 1912 Port Credit, Ontario, Canada
- Died: March 8, 2001 (aged 88)
- Party: Liberal
- Children: John Godfrey
- Committees: Co-Chair, Standing Joint Committee on Regulations and other Statutory Instruments (1979 & 1980–1984)

Military service
- Allegiance: Canada
- Branch/service: Royal Canadian Air Force
- Years of service: 1940 – 1945
- Rank: Wing Commander

John Morrow Godfrey (June 28, 1912 – March 8, 2001) was a Canadian pilot, lawyer and politician.

== Education ==
Godfrey was born in Port Credit, Ontario. He was educated at the Royal Military College of Canada in 1929 and at Osgoode Hall Law School.

== Career ==
During the Second World War, Godfrey was a pilot and Wing Commander with the Royal Canadian Air Force in the United Kingdom and France. After the war, he was a named partner in the law firm of Campbell, Godfrey and Lewtas (now Fasken Martineau DuMoulin). He was a fundraiser for the Liberal Party of Canada.

In 1973, he was appointed to the Senate of Canada representing the senatorial division of Rosedale, Ontario. A Liberal, he retired on his 75th birthday in 1987.

== Family ==
=== Wife ===
Mary Godfrey (née Ferguson) was born in Toronto, Ontario, where she later attended Bishop Strachan School for girls. Mary then went on to study at the University of Toronto and she began her business career soon after. John and Mary met when John was attending Osgoode Hall Law School. The couple married in 1940 while John was in the air force during World War II. Throughout her life, Mary was very involved in the community through various committees, boards, and volunteer work. Mary believed that there should be a good balance of culture and welfare work in one's life. The cultural work that Mary did included being a member of the National Ballet Committee as she hoped to see development of ballet in Canada. She was also on the Opera Festival Women's Committee of Toronto and was appointed president of the committee in June 1958. The welfare work that Mary did included volunteering at the Toronto General Hospital, being a member of the Junior League, as well as being on the advisory board of the Women's Auxiliary.

=== Son ===
John Godfrey is a former Member of Parliament, cabinet minister, historian and economist. He is one of John and Mary Godfrey's four children which include two boys and two girls.
