= Jean-Marie Poitras =

Canadian politician

The Honourable Jean-Marie Poitras OC OQ

Senator for De Salaberry, Quebec
- In office September 26, 1988 – May 25, 1993
- Appointed by: Brian Mulroney
- Preceded by: Yvette Boucher Rousseau
- Succeeded by: Pierre Claude Nolin

Personal details
- Born: September 5, 1918 Macamic, Quebec
- Died: February 27, 2009 (aged 90) Quebec City, Quebec
- Party: Progressive Conservative
- Committees: Chairman, Standing Committee on Banking, Trade and Commerce (1991–1993)

Jean-Marie Poitras, OC OQ (September 5, 1918 – February 27, 2009) was a Canadian senator.

== Biography ==
Born in Macamic, Quebec, he was appointed to the Senate in 1988 representing the senatorial division of De Salaberry, Quebec. He resigned on May 25, 1993, just short of his 75th birthday and mandatory retirement. He was a member of the Progressive Conservative caucus.

In 1970, he was made an Officer of the Order of Canada for his work with Scouts Canada. In 1994, he was made an Officer of the National Order of Quebec.

== See also ==
- List of Quebec senators
