= Staff Barootes =

Canadian politician

The Honourable Staff Barootes

Canadian Senator from Saskatchewan
- In office 1984–1993
- Appointed by: Brian Mulroney

Personal details
- Born: Efstathios William Barootes; November 15, 1918 Winnipeg, Manitoba, Canada
- Died: July 30, 2000 (aged 81)
- Party: Progressive Conservative
- Committees: Chair, Standing Committee on Agriculture and Forestry (1989-1993)

Efstathios William (Staff) Barootes (November 15, 1918 – July 30, 2000) was a Canadian physician, urologist, and parliamentarian.

== Background ==
Born in Winnipeg, Manitoba, of Greek immigrants, he moved with his family to Saskatoon, Saskatchewan. He received a Bachelor of Arts degree in 1940 and a medical degree in 1943 from the University of Toronto. He then served with the Royal Canadian Army Medical Corps during World War II. After the war, he did postgraduate work in urology. He then moved to Regina, Saskatchewan, where he practiced until he retired in 1979.

After retiring, he focused on politics. He was the chief fund raiser for the Progressive Conservative Party of Saskatchewan and helped form the government in Saskatchewan in 1982. In 1984, he was one of the first three appointments made Prime Minister Brian Mulroney to the Senate. He represented the Senatorial division of Regina-Qu'Appelle, Saskatchewan and resigned shortly before his 75th birthday in 1993.

He served as treasurer and deputy president of the Canadian Medical Association. He was a director of IPSCO, the Canadian steel company, from 1982 to 1989.

== See also ==
- List of Saskatchewan senators
- Greek Canadians
