= Nancy Bell =

Canadian politician (1924–1989)

The Honourable Ann Elizabeth Haddon "Nancy" Bell

Canadian Senator from British Columbia
- In office October 7, 1970 – November 29, 1989
- Governor General: Roland Michener
- Prime Minister: Pierre Trudeau
- Constituency: Nanaimo—Malaispina, British Columbia, Canada

Personal details
- Born: May 26, 1924 Ottawa, Ontario, Canada
- Died: November 29, 1989 (aged 65) Victoria, British Columbia, Canada
- Occupation: director

Ann Elizabeth Haddon "Nancy" Heath Bell (May 26, 1924 – November 29, 1989) was a Canadian senator.

== Background ==
She was appointed to the Senate of Canada by Prime Minister Pierre Trudeau in 1970 and sat as a Liberal representing Nanaimo-Malaspina, British Columbia. Independently minded, she did not believe in party discipline and often voted against legislation proposed by the Liberal government. She was a supporter of the monarchy and opposed the renaming of Dominion Day to Canada Day.

In 1985, Bell left the Liberal Party to sit as an Independent Senator. Bell died of cancer in 1989 at a hospital in Victoria, while still in office.
