= Douglas Everett (politician) =

Canadian politician

The Honourable Douglas Everett

Canadian Senator from Manitoba
- In office 1966–1994
- Appointed by: Lester B. Pearson

Personal details
- Born: Douglas Donald Everett; August 12, 1927 Vancouver, British Columbia, Canada
- Died: March 27, 2018 (aged 90) Winnipeg, Manitoba, Canada
- Party: Liberal
- Education: Osgoode Hall Law School (LLB)

Douglas Donald Everett (August 12, 1927 – March 27, 2018) was a Canadian politician, lawyer, and automobile dealer. He served in the Senate of Canada from 1966 until 1994.

== Background ==
Born in Vancouver, British Columbia, he attended the Royal Canadian Naval College in Royal Roads, British Columbia from 1943 to 1945 and served as a Sub-Lieutenant from 1943 to 1947. After his military service, he received a Bachelor of Laws degree from Osgoode Hall Law School in 1950 and from the University of Manitoba in 1951. He was called to Bar of Ontario in 1950 and the Bar of Manitoba in 1951.

In 1966, he was appointed to the Senate representing the senatorial division of Fort Rouge, Manitoba. In 1969, he promoted a bill addressing the production and conservation of oil and gas in Canada's north.

He sat as a Liberal until 1990 when he resigned from the Liberal Party over his support of the introduction of the GST. He then sat as an Independent Liberal. He resigned from the Senate in 1994. Everett died in March 2018 at the age of 90.
