= Earl Hastings =

Canadian politician

The Honourable Earl Hastings

Canadian Senator from Alberta
- In office February 24, 1966 – May 5, 1996

Personal details
- Born: January 7, 1924 Regina, Saskatchewan, Canada
- Died: May 5, 1996 (aged 72) Calgary, Alberta, Canada
- Party: Liberal
- Spouse: Evelyn Kain
- Children: 3
- Occupation: Politician; petroleum landman

Earl Adams Hastings (January 7, 1924 – May 5, 1996) was a Canadian politician.

== Background ==
Hastings was born in Regina, Saskatchewan. He ran for the House of Commons of Canada twice for the Liberal Party of Canada in the 1962 federal election and the 1963 federal election in the Bow River district. He was easily defeated both times.

On February 24, 1966 he was appointed to the Senate of Canada on the advice of Lester B. Pearson and served until his death on May 5, 1996.
