= Edward M. Lawson =

Canadian politician and trade unionist

The Honourable Edward M. Lawson

Canadian Senator from British Columbia
- In office October 7, 1970 – September 24, 2004
- Appointed by: Pierre Trudeau

Personal details
- Born: September 24, 1929 Gerald, Saskatchewan, Canada
- Died: February 29, 2016 (aged 86)
- Party: Liberal

Edward M. Lawson (September 24, 1929 – February 29, 2016) was a Canadian trade unionist and politician.

== Background ==
Born in Gerald, Saskatchewan, Lawson was the second longest-serving member of the Senate of Canada, and the longest-serving senator to be appointed by Prime Minister Pierre Trudeau when he retired upon reaching the age of 75 on September 24, 2004. He was appointed on October 7, 1970 as an independent. He represented the city of Vancouver, British Columbia, and is the former Canadian director of the International Brotherhood of Teamsters. Lawson served as an independent Senator until 2003 when he joined the Liberal Party of Canada following the election of Paul Martin as party leader.
