= Peter Bosa =

Canadian politician (1927–1998)

The Honourable Peter Bosa

Canadian Senator from Ontario
- In office 1977–1998
- Appointed by: Pierre Trudeau

Personal details
- Born: May 2, 1927 Friuli, Italy
- Died: December 10, 1998 (aged 71)
- Party: Liberal

Peter Bosa (May 2, 1927 – December 10, 1998) was a Canadian politician. He represented Ontario in the Senate of Canada from 1977 to 1998.

== Background ==
Born in Friuli, Italy, he immigrated to Canada in 1948. He started working in his father's clothing shop as an apprentice cutter. He later became an insurance executive.

He was an alderman for the City of York for seven years.

In 1977, he was appointed to the Senate representing the senatorial division of York-Caboto, Ontario. He served until his death in 1998. He served as a president of Toronto Italia, and was one of the founders of the Eastern Canada Professional Soccer League.

There is a Peter Bosa fonds at Library and Archives Canada. A parkette in York is named the Senator Peter Bosa Parkette.
