= Nathan Nurgitz =

Canadian lawyer, judge, and politician (1934–2019)

The Honourable Nathan Nurgitz

Canadian Senator from Manitoba
- In office 1979–1993
- Appointed by: Joe Clark

Personal details
- Born: June 22, 1934 Winnipeg, Manitoba, Canada
- Died: October 19, 2019 (aged 85)
- Party: Progressive Conservative
- Education: University of Manitoba (BA, LLB)

Nathan Nurgitz (June 22, 1934 – October 19, 2019) was a Canadian politician, lawyer, and judge. He was appointed to the Senate of Canada, serving from 1979 until 1993.

== Early life and education ==
Born in Winnipeg, Manitoba, Canada, his parents, Hymie and Dora, had come to Manitoba in the early 1900s as refugees from tsarist Russia. He received a Bachelor of Arts degree in 1954 and a Bachelor of Law degree in 1958 from the University of Manitoba and had taken attended a Harvard course on mediation. He was created a Queen's Counsel in 1977. From 1968 to 1975, he sat as a Magistrate in the city of West Kildonan. He was elected a Bencher of the Law Society of Manitoba in 1978, and re-elected in 1980.

== Career ==
From 1963 to 1969, he was an alderman of the City of West Kildonan, which is now a suburb of Winnipeg. From 1970 to 1971, he was the National Vice-President and President of the Progressive Conservative Party of Canada.

In 1979, he was summoned to the Senate representing the senatorial division of Winnipeg North, Manitoba on the recommendation of Prime Minister Joe Clark. Sitting as a Progressive Conservative, Nurgitz was variously appointed to Senate committees on agriculture and forestry, foreign affairs, banking, trade and commerce, and national finance, and chaired the Standing Committee on Legal and Constitutional Affairs from 1989 to 1991 and also served as co-chair of the Joint Committee of the Senate and House of Commons on Scrutiny. In 1987, he was elected chair of the Canadian Group of the Inter-Parliamentary Union, and was subsequently re-elected in 1989 and 1990.

He resigned from the Senate in 1993 to accept an appointment as a Judge of the Court of Queen's Bench of Manitoba, remaining with the court until his retirement in 2009. He also served as a deputy judge of the Nunavut Court of Justice from 2005 to 2009.

On May 28, 2009, Nurgitz re-joined the Winnipeg Law Firm of Thompson Dorfman Sweatman, he had previously practiced law at the firm between 1979 and 1993 before his appointment to the bench.

He is the co-author of Strong and Free (1970) and No Small Measure, with Hugh Segal (1983).

== Death ==
Nurgitz died on October 19, 2019, after suffering from Alzheimer's disease for several years.
