= Ernest G. Cottreau =

Canadian politician

The Honourable Ernest G. Cottreau

Senator for South Western Nova, Nova Scotia
- In office May 8, 1974 – January 28, 1989
- Nominated by: Pierre Trudeau
- Appointed by: Jules Léger

Personal details
- Born: January 28, 1914 Wedgeport, Nova Scotia
- Died: March 7, 2004 (aged 90) Yarmouth, Nova Scotia
- Party: Liberal
- Education: Université Sainte-Anne
- Profession: Businessman, educator

Ernest George Cottreau (January 28, 1914 – March 7, 2004) was a Canadian businessman and educator. From 1974 until his retirement in 1989, he represented South Western Nova, Nova Scotia in the Senate of Canada.

== Early life and education ==
He was born in Wedgeport, Nova Scotia, the son of George and Emilie (LeBlanc) Cottreau. In 1937, he graduated cum laude from Université Sainte-Anne, after studying philosophy and classics. He continued with post graduate studies in French and education, and taught at the university for several years after his graduation.

== Career ==
Cottreau was a professor at Université Sainte-Anne in Nova Scotia, owner of an automobile dealership, Baker Motors, for fifteen years, a school principal, and served as president of the province's Liberal association in 1955.

== Appointment to the Senate ==
In 1974, he was named to the Senate of Canada by Pierre Trudeau and retired upon reaching the mandatory retirement age of 75 in 1989.

== Death ==
He died at the age of 90 in Yarmouth, Nova Scotia.
