= Herbert O. Sparrow =

Canadian politician

The Honourable Herbert O. Sparrow CM

Canadian Senator from Saskatchewan
- In office 1968–2005
- Appointed by: Lester B. Pearson

Personal details
- Born: January 4, 1930 Saskatoon, Saskatchewan, Canada
- Died: September 6, 2012 (aged 82)
- Party: Liberal
- Committees: Chair, Standing Committee on Agriculture (1980–1983); Chair, Standing Committee on Agriculture, Fisheries and Forestry (1983–1984)

Herbert Orval Sparrow, CM (January 4, 1930 – September 6, 2012) was a Canadian politician.

== Background ==
At the time of his retirement, Sparrow was the longest-serving member of the Senate of Canada, and was the last remaining member of the Upper House to have been appointed by Prime Minister Lester Pearson. He was appointed on February 9, 1968, and sat as a member of the Liberal Party of Canada representing the province of Saskatchewan. Sparrow retired from the Senate upon reaching the mandatory retirement age of 75 on January 4, 2005.

Sparrow was a businessman, farmer and rancher. He opened one of the first Canadian KFC locations in North Battleford, Saskatchewan in the 1950s and still operated the establishment until his death.

In 2008, he was made a Member of the Order of Canada.

Sparrow was in excellent health despite his advanced age until 2012 when he had a massive stroke and had to be transferred to RUH in Saskatoon where he died less than a week later.
