= Daniel Lang (Ontario politician) =

Canadian politician

Daniel Aiken Lang (June 13, 1919 – December 1, 1997) was a Canadian senator.

Born in Toronto, Ontario, the son of Daniel Webster Lang who co-founded the law firm of Lang Michener, Lang attended Upper Canada College, Trinity College, University of Toronto, and Osgoode Hall Law School. During World War II, he served as a lieutenant in the Royal Canadian Naval Volunteer Reserve. After the war, he joined his father's law firm and was called to the Bar of Ontario in 1947. He practised corporate and tax law. From 1957 to 1961, he was a councillor in Forest Hill, Ontario. He served as federal campaign chairman in 1962 and 1963 for the Liberal Party.

He was summoned to the Senate of Canada for the Ontario senatorial division of South York on the advice of Prime Minister Lester B. Pearson in 1964. In 1986, he left the Liberal caucus and choose to sit as an independent. He was a member of the Senate Committee on Banking, Trade and Commerce from 1964 to 1983. Though he was one of the last senators appointed for life, he chose to retire at age 75 in 1994.
