= Arthur Tremblay =

Canadian politician (1917–1996)

The Honourable Arthur Julien Tremblay PC OC OQ

Senator for The Laurentides
- In office 1979–1992
- Appointed by: Joe Clark
- Preceded by: Maurice Bourget
- Succeeded by: Raymond Setlakwe

Personal details
- Born: June 18, 1917 St-Bruno, Quebec
- Died: October 27, 1996 (aged 79)
- Party: Progressive Conservative
- Committees: Chair, Standing Committee on Social Affairs, Science and Technology (1984–1988)

Arthur Julien Tremblay, PC OC OQ (June 18, 1917 – October 27, 1996) was a Canadian politician.

Born in St-Bruno, Lac Saint-Jean, Quebec, he received a Master of Arts degree in 1942 from Université Laval and a Master of Education degree in 1945 from Harvard University.

In 1979, he was appointed by Joe Clark to the Senate representing the senatorial division of The Laurentides, Quebec. A Progressive Conservative, he retired on his 75th birthday in 1992.

In 1976, he was made an Officer of the Order of Canada for "his contribution to the public service". In 1991, he was made an Officer of the National Order of Quebec.
