= Charles McElman =

Canadian politician (1920–2000)

Charles Robert McElman (June 18, 1920 – December 31, 2000) was a Canadian Senator.

A banker by profession, McElman was a senior Liberal strategist in New Brunswick.

After working as a junior bank employee, he enlisted in the Royal Canadian Air Force during World War II.

After the war he worked as Secretary of the New Brunswick Liquor Control Board and was also involved in provincial Liberal politics working the First Executive Secretary of the New Brunswick Liberal Association.

He also worked as Personal Secretary to Premier John McNair until the Liberal government's defeat in the 1952 provincial election.

McElman worked to rebuild the Liberal Party after its defeat and worked closely with Louis J. Robichaud after he became party leader in 1958. When the Liberals were returned to power in the 1960 provincial election he served as Executive Assistant to Premier Robichaud and helped develop and implement the Program for Equal Opportunity which sought to improve the quality of health care and social services throughout the province.

In 1966, he was summoned to the Senate of Canada representing the senatorial division of Nashwaak Valley, New Brunswick. A Liberal, he resigned in 1990.
