= Sutton Place =

Sutton Place may refer to:

== Canada ==
- Sutton Place Hotel Toronto, a former hotel in Toronto, Ontario
- Sutton Place Hotel Vancouver, a hotel in Vancouver, British Columbia

== England ==
- Sutton Place, Hackney, a Georgian terrace in London
- Sutton Place, Surrey, a country house

== United States ==
- Sutton Place, Manhattan, a neighborhood and street in New York City
