= Bobby Short =

American singer and pianist (1924–2005)

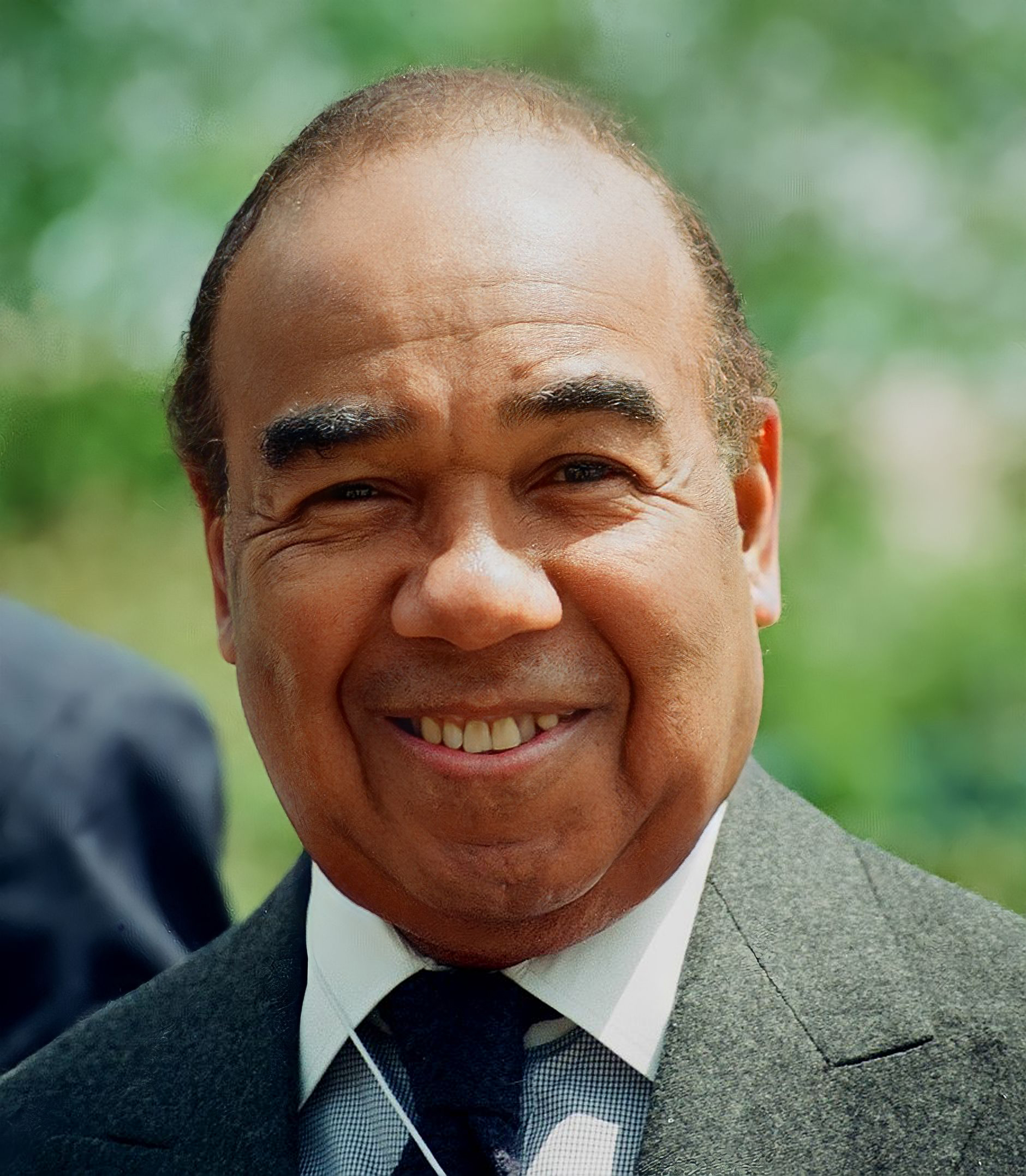
- Short in 2000

Background information
- Born: Robert Waltrip Short; September 15, 1924; Danville, Illinois, U.S.
- Died: March 21, 2005 (aged 80) New York City, U.S.
- Genres: Swing, traditional pop, vocal jazz
- Occupations: Singer, pianist
- Label: Atlantic Records

Robert Waltrip Short (September 15, 1924 – March 21, 2005) was an American cabaret singer and pianist who interpreted songs by popular composers from the first half of the 20th century such as Rodgers and Hart, Cole Porter, Jerome Kern, Harold Arlen, Richard A. Whiting, Vernon Duke, Noël Coward and George and Ira Gershwin.

Short also championed African-American composers of the same period such as Eubie Blake, James P. Johnson, Andy Razaf, Fats Waller, Duke Ellington and Billy Strayhorn, presenting their work not in a polemical way, but as simply the obvious equal of that of their white contemporaries.

Short's dedication to his great love – what he called the "Great American Song" – left him equally adept at performing the witty lyrics of Bessie Smith's "Gimme a Pigfoot (And a Bottle of Beer)" or Gershwin and Duke's "I Can't Get Started". Short stated his favorite songwriters were Ellington, Arlen and Kern, and he was instrumental in spearheading the construction of the Ellington Memorial in New York City. He was a friend of Tom Jobim and was present during the composer's final days in New York City.

== Early life ==
Short was born in Danville, Illinois. During his adolescence, he performed in the Danville High School dramatic club with Dick Van Dyke and Donald O'Connor. He began performing piano in dance halls and saloons, and as a busker, after leaving home at age 11 for Chicago with his mother's permission.

== Career ==
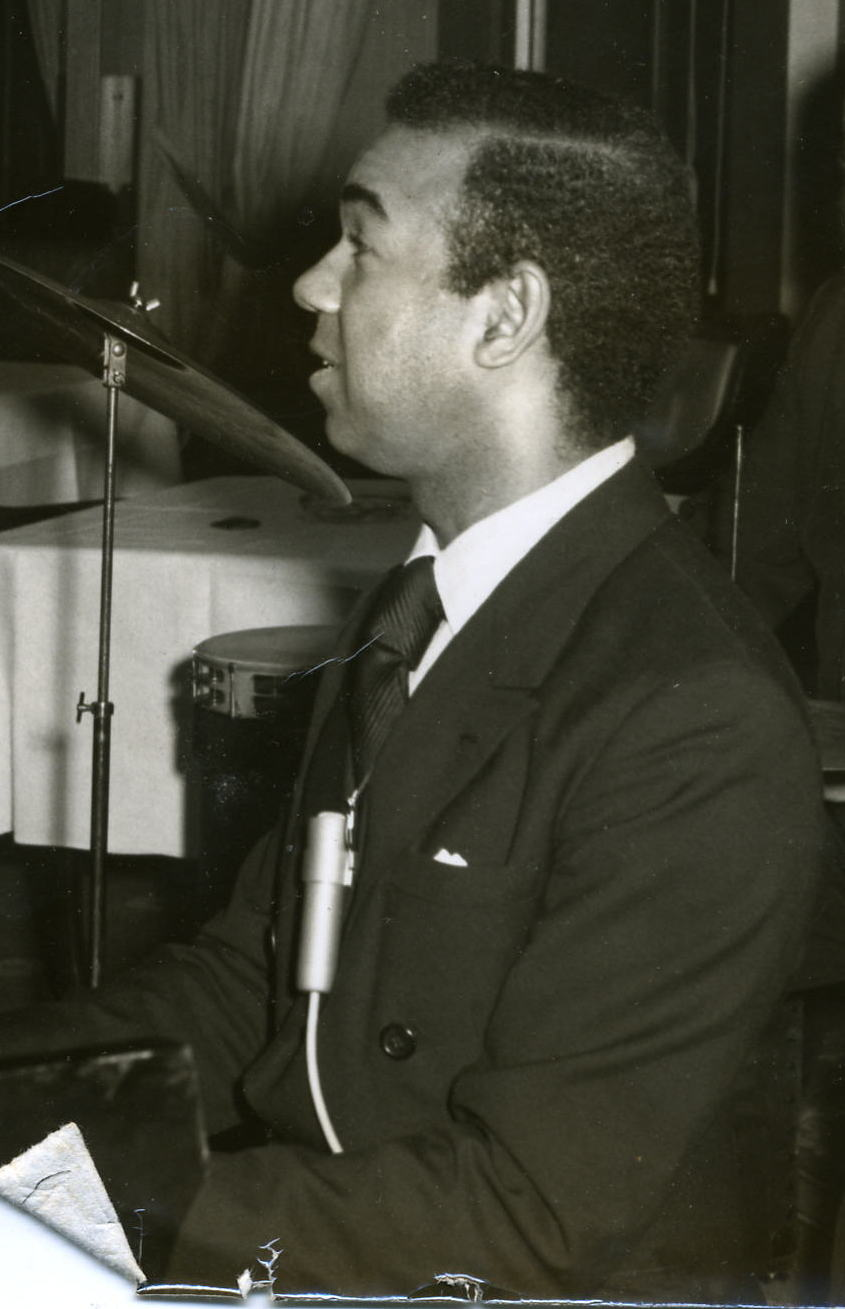
Bobby Short in 1972

Short began his adult musical career in clubs in the 1940s. In 1968 he was offered a two-week stint at the Café Carlyle in New York City, to fill in for George Feyer. Short (accompanied by Beverly Peer on bass and Dick Sheridan on drums) became an institution at the Carlyle, as Feyer had been before him, and remained there as a featured performer for more than 35 years. He often performed impromptu all-night sets at his various favorite cafes and restaurants. He was a regular patron at Ted Hook's Backstage, at Eighth Avenue and 45th Street.

In 1971 Short published Black and White Baby, a description of his childhood upbringing in the dance halls and saloons of Chicago and New York, and his family's fight for survival after the death of his father. He followed with Bobby Short: The Life and Times of a Saloon Singer in 1995, chronicling his career into the 1940s, 1950s and 1960s.

Short continued his career in the 1970s and 1980s singing for films and television. In 1972, he performed the theme song to James Ivory's film Savages. In 1976, Short sang and appeared in a commercial for Revlon's perfume "Charlie". In 1979 he performed a 25-song set that was released on DVD in 2004 as Bobby Short at the Cafe Carlyle. In 1981, he made a cameo appearance on The Love Boat in a two-part episode. In 1985, he sang part of the opening theme for the NBC television show Misfits of Science. Short continued working in films when, in 1986, he appeared in the Woody Allen film Hannah and Her Sisters. Allen used Short's recording of "I Happen to Like New York" for the opening title of Manhattan Murder Mystery (1993).

In 1991, Short made a guest appearance as blues musician Ches Collins on the TV series In the Heat of the Night in the episode "Sweet, Sweet Blues". He also performed the episode's theme song. He reprised the role in the 1994 episode "Ches and the Grand Lady". In 1993, he made an appearance in the Michael J. Fox comedy film For Love or Money, performing Marc Shaiman's song "In Your Eyes". Short's final film role was in Man of the Century (1999).

== Later years ==
In 2000, the Library of Congress designated Short a Living Legend, a recognition established as part of its bicentennial celebration. The next year, his voice was featured in the 200th episode of the sitcom Frasier. In 2004, Short announced plans to end his regular appearances at the Café Carlyle by the end of the year. He continued to tour and travel until the end of his life.

== Awards ==
Bobby Short was inducted as a Laureate of The Lincoln Academy of Illinois and in 1983 was awarded the Order of Lincoln by the governor of Illinois (the state's highest honor) in the area of performing arts.

== Personal life ==
Short adopted nephew Ronald Bell of San Francisco, the son of Short's older brother William.

He was known for his lavish parties at his Sutton Place apartment in Manhattan.

Although Short never publicly declared he was gay, it was well known among his friends, fellow musicians, and some of his fans. When asked by a friend why he had not taken part in any of the gay pride marches of the 1970s and 1980s, Short's response was, "I have a living to make! I can't afford to march in the Gay Pride Parade".

== Death ==
On March 21, 2005, Short died of leukemia at New York Presbyterian Hospital. He is buried in Atherton Cemetery in Danville, Illinois, the city of his birth.

== Discography ==
- Songs by Bobby Short (1955, Atlantic)
- Bobby Short (1956, Atlantic)
- Speaking of Love (1957, Atlantic)
- Sing Me A Swing Song (1958, Atlantic)
- The Mad Twenties (1959, Atlantic)
- Bobby Short on the East Side (1960, Atlantic)
- My Personal Property (1963, Atlantic)
- Mabel Mercer & Bobby Short At Town Hall (1968, Atlantic)
- Mabel Mercer & Bobby Short Second Town Hall Concert (1969, Atlantic)
- Jump for Joy (1969, Atlantic)
- Nobody Else But Me (1971, Atlantic)
- Bobby Loves Cole Porter (1971, Atlantic)
- Bobby Short is Mad About Noël Coward (1972, Atlantic)
- Bobby Short is K-RA-ZY for Gershwin (1973, Atlantic)
- Live at the Cafe Carlyle (1974, Atlantic)
- Bobby Short Celebrates Rodgers & Hart (1975, Atlantic)
- Personal (1977, Atlantic)
- Moments Like This (1982, Elektra/Asylum)
- Guess Who's in Town: Bobby Short Performs the Songs of Andy Razaf (1987, Atlantic)
- Late Night at the Cafe Carlyle (1992, Telarc)
- Swing That Music (1993, Telarc)
- Songs of New York (Live) (1995, Telarc)
- Celebrating 30 Years of the Cafe Carlyle (1998, Telarc)
- You're the Top: The Love Songs of Cole Porter (1999, Telarc)
- Piano (2001, Surroundedby Entertainment)

=== As guest vocalist ===
With Benny Carter

- Benny Carter Songbook (MusicMasters, 1996)

== Filmography ==
- Call Me Mister (1951)
- Roots: The Next Generations (1979)
- Hardhat and Legs (1980)
- You're the Top: The Cole Porter Story (1983)
- Hannah and her Sisters (1986)
- The Price of the Ticket (1989)
- For Love or Money (1993)
- Blue Ice (1993)
- Man of the Century (1999)
- Always At The Carlyle (2018)

=== Television ===
- The Love Boat (2 episodes, 1981)
- In the Heat of the Night (2 episodes, 1991, 1994)
- Frasier (1 episode, 2001)
- 7th Heaven (1 episode 2003)
