= Tom Gaglardi =

Canadian business executive

- Born: December 7, 1967 (age 58)
- Occupations: Business Executive, National Hockey League Owner
- Relatives: Phil Gaglardi (grandfather)

R. Thomas Gaglardi (born December 7, 1967) is a Canadian business executive, and the owner of the Dallas Stars of the National Hockey League.

== Career ==
Gaglardi is president of Northland Properties Corporation of Vancouver, British Columbia, which he and his family own. The company operates hotels and restaurants in Canada and employs more than 10,000 people.

He also serves as Chairman of the Board and Chief Executive Officer of Sandman Hotels, Inns & Suites and Moxie's Grill & Bar. He has been a Director of Leading Brands, Inc. since October 1998 and Secretary since June 1999.

== Hockey owner ==
Gaglardi first showed interest in buying a National Hockey League team in 2004, when he and business partner Ryan Beedie made a bid to purchase fifty percent of the Vancouver Canucks from then-owner John McCaw, Jr. A competing bid by a former partner of both Gaglardi and Beedie, Francesco Aquilini, was accepted by McCaw; Aquilini would acquire full ownership of the Canucks in 2006, but a high-profile legal battle would ensue between the former business partners over the ownership of the team, with the Supreme Court of British Columbia ruling in Aquilini's favour in July 2009.

In April 2010, Gaglardi proposed purchasing the Atlanta Thrashers and relocating the team to Hamilton, Ontario. This potential move, although it never drew the amount of opposition that Jim Balsillie's similar efforts have provoked, never happened, and True North Sports & Entertainment purchased the team instead, moving it to Winnipeg to become the second and current incarnation of the Jets.

Gaglardi was formally introduced as the new owner of the Dallas Stars hockey team on November 18, 2011. He first expressed an interest in buying the Stars in 2009 and spent more than a year going through the process of completing the deal for the team, which went through a bankruptcy proceeding. As the new owner, Gaglardi's first move was bringing back former Stars president Jim Lites to once again take the reins as team President & CEO.

A bankruptcy court judge approved the bid for an enterprise value of $240 million. First line creditors got about 75 cents on the dollar. The Stars lost $38 million during their last fiscal year and $92 million over the last three seasons.

He also is part of the ownership group of the Kamloops Blazers of the Western Hockey League and, as of 2014, owner of the Texas Stars, the Dallas Stars' AHL affiliate.

== Personal life ==
His grandfather, Phil Gaglardi was a politician in British Columbia. His mother is a native of Longview, Texas and he said he has “serious University of Texas relatives” who live west of Fort Worth, Texas.

Sporting positions
Preceded by Tom Hicks	Dallas Stars owner 2011–present	Incumbent
