= Sandman Hotels =

Canadian hotel chain

Sandman Hotel Group
- Type: Subsidiary
- Founded: 1967; 59 years ago in Smithers, British Columbia, Canada
- Headquarters: Vancouver, Canada
- Number of locations: 60+ (2024)
- Areas served: Canada, United States of America and United Kingdom
- Key people: Tom Gaglardi (CEO)
- Brands: Sandman Inns; Sandman Hotel & Suites; Sandman Signature Hotels & Resorts
- Owner: Northland Properties
- Website: www.sandmanhotels.com

Sandman Hotel Group is a Canadian hotel chain owned by Northland Properties.

== Overview ==
In 1967, the first Sandman Inn opened in Smithers, British Columbia. The company rapidly expanded, opening at least one property every year. In 1976, a new tier of hotels was added to the company profile with Sandman Hotel Vancouver. In 2007, the Sandman Signature brand was added as a higher end brand. With the corporate headquarters based in Vancouver, British Columbia, Canada, the company currently has over 60 properties across Canada under the brands Sandman Inns, Sandman Hotel & Suites, Sutton Place Hotels and Sandman Signature Hotels & Resorts. Four Sandman Signature properties now operate in the UK based in Newcastle, Aberdeen, Glasgow and London Gatwick, alongside a resort in Ireland, Portmarnock Resort & Jameson Golf Links. Tom Gaglardi is Chief Executive Officer for Sandman Hotel Group. Tom Gaglardi is also the owner of the Dallas Stars.

== Brands and properties ==
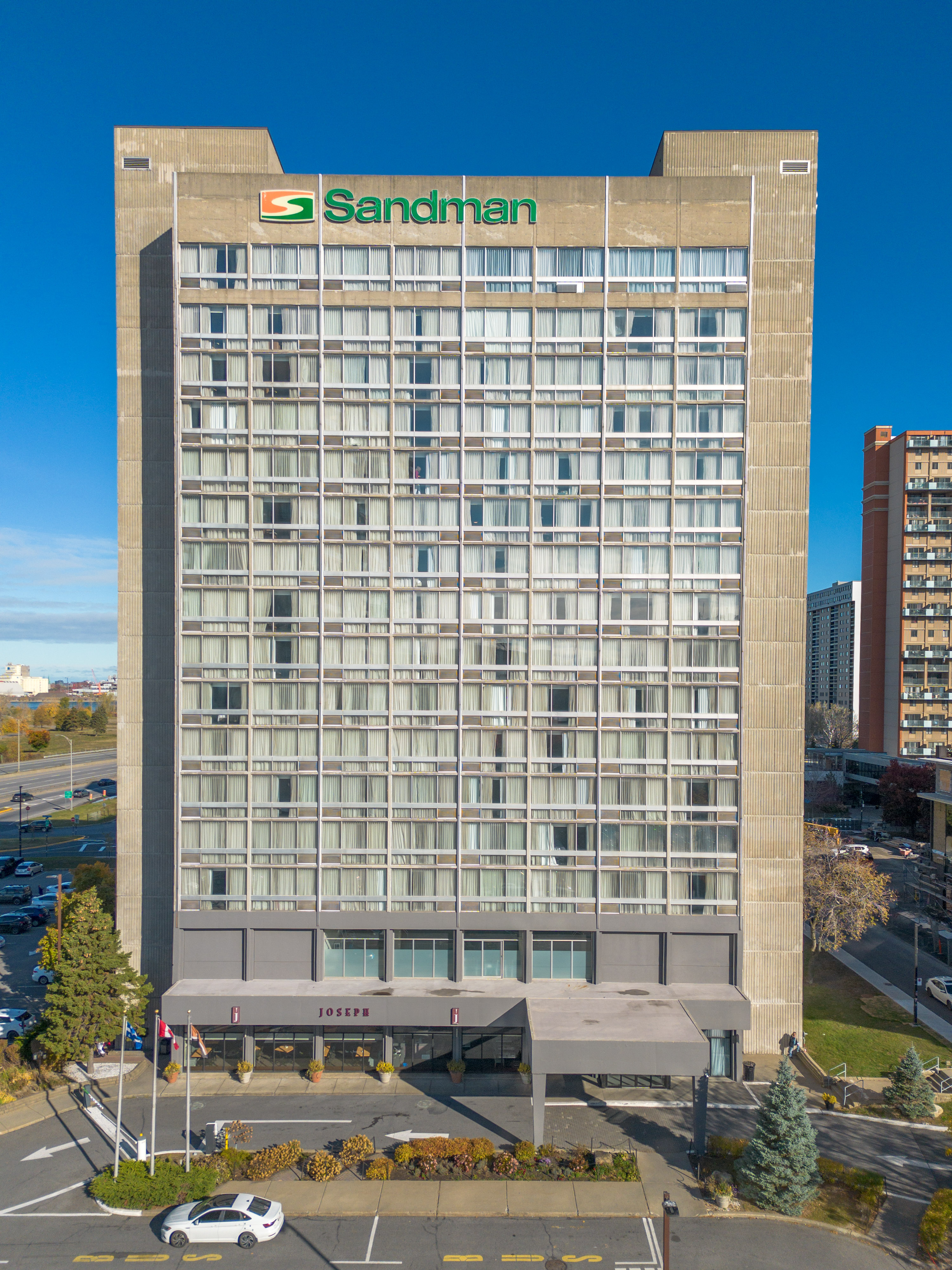
Sandman Hotel in Longueuil

- Sandman Inns are situated along major travel routes and were the first tier of hotels that Northland established in Canada. They cater to the frequent traveller including on-site restaurants with room service. There are 6 locations, all within British Columbia.
- Sandman Hotel & Suites is a mid-range brand with 32 locations throughout Canada, in city centres, growing districts, and near major airports. The brand has amenities such as Northland-owned restaurants, room service, and fitness facilities.
- Sandman Signature Hotels & Resorts is an upscale brand launched in 2007, with high-end amenities and conveniences such as spas, restaurants, rooms, business centres, concierge, and valet service. There are locations in Canada, the United States, the United Kingdom and Ireland.
- Sutton Place Hotels is a luxury full-service brand, added initially with the acquisition of the downtown Vancouver location in 2011 and since expanding to four properties in Canada.

== Incident ==
- On January 8, 2024, the Fort Worth, Texas property experienced a gas explosion, damaging the hotel. Twenty-one people were injured in the explosion.
