= Sutton Place Hotel Toronto =

Hotel in Toronto, Ontario

Coordinates: 43.664770°N 79.386974°W

The Sutton Place Hotel Toronto
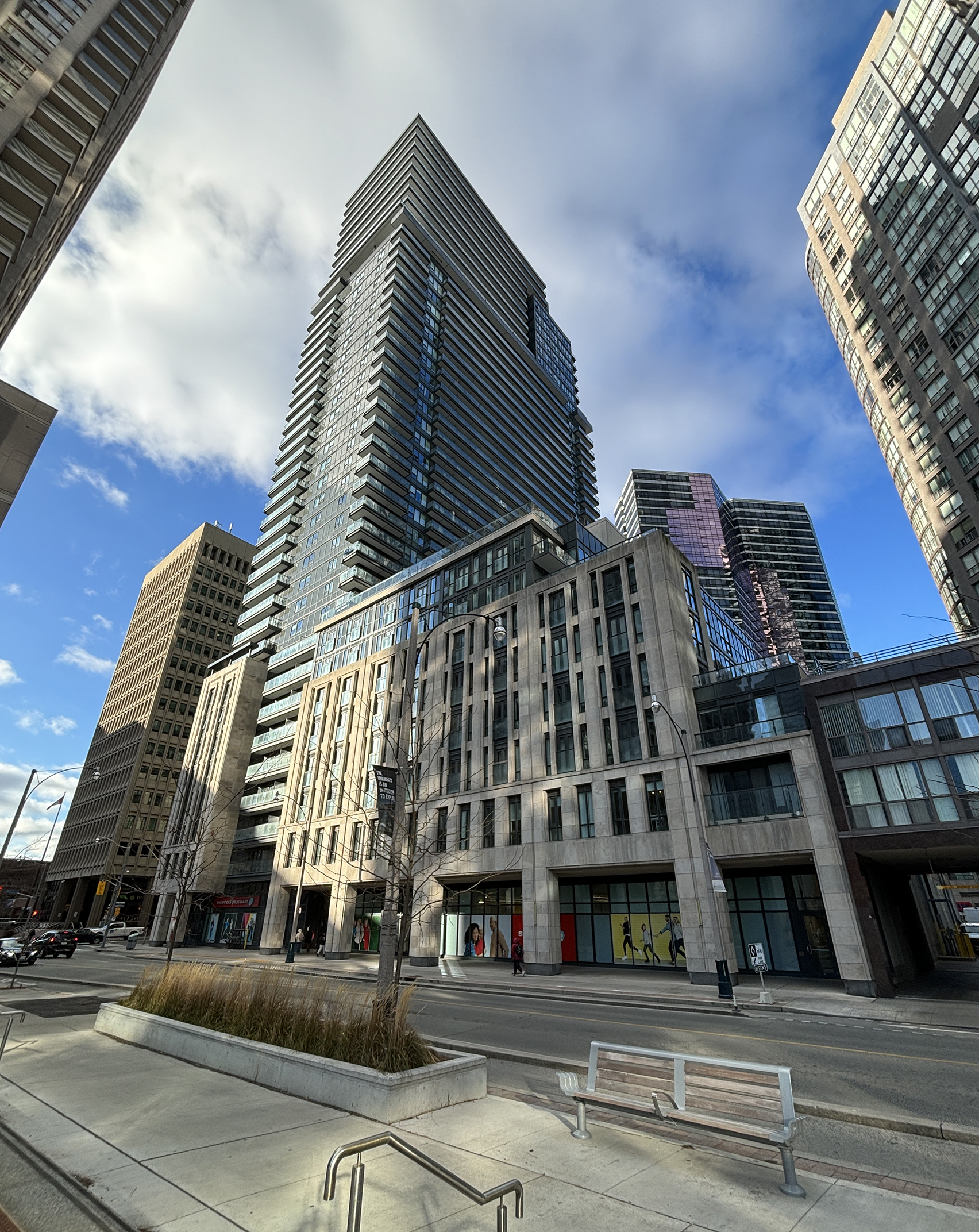

General information
- Location: Toronto, Ontario

The Sutton Place Hotel Toronto was a Canadian luxury hotel located in Toronto, Ontario.

== History ==
Between 1967 and 2012, the Sutton Place Hotel was located at the intersection of Bay Street and Wellesley Street.

An example of Brutalist architecture, the building was developed by Max Tanenbaum, the founder of York Steel, and the lawyer David Dennis. The architectural firm Webb Zerafa and Menkès (now WZMH Architects) – the descendant of Peter Dickinson Associates – designed the building, which along with the hotel included luxury apartments on the upper floors.

The design echoed the Southland Center in Dallas, which was also a monolith that featured a large block-letter name at the top. Floors 1-10 served as the hotel, floors 11-32 as private apartments. The 32nd and top floor, which was numbered 33 due to the exclusion of a 13th floor, offered panoramic views of the city through the restaurant Stop 33, which featured a starlight ceiling and tall windows. Also included in the structure were two pools, a pub, a banquet hall and an office building. The lobby featured a mural painted by Shirley Tattersfield depicting Canada's history, a tribute to the country's centennial that year. At the time of its opening, Sutton Place was the tallest building in Toronto north of Queen Street.

During its time Sutton Place hosted numerous celebrities and was a major destination for actors during the annual Toronto International Film Festival. Notable guests included Pierre Trudeau, Sophia Loren, Elizabeth Taylor, Stevie Nicks and Ted Danson. In 1967, the vibraphonist Hagood Hardy recorded the album Stop 33 in the lounge of the same name, where his band had a residency.

Three months after it opened, the stock promoter Myer Rush was seriously injured by a bomb planted in the bed of the 6th-floor room where he was staying. Myer had been due in court the next morning to face charges in an alleged $100 million stock fraud.

=== Redevelopment ===
The building itself was sold to a Hong Kong-based ownership group in 1993. It was purchased in the early 2010s by Lanterra Developments. The hotel officially closed on 15 June 2012, forty-five years after opening. All contents of the hotel were sold at auction in 2014.

In 2013, the redevelopment plan faced opposition from most of the tenants in the 161 rental units. In late 2015, the building was gutted, several stories were added, and work began on converting the existing frame into a new condominium tower called The Britt, completed in 2019, which contains 727 residential units, 78 of which are rental units.

=== Return of Sutton Place brand ===
The King Blue Hotel Toronto at 355 King Street West was purchased by Northland Properties in 2021 and renamed Sutton Place Toronto in 2023. The Sutton Place Hotels also manages hotel properties in Halifax, Nova Scotia; Revelstoke, British Columbia and Vancouver, British Columbia (The Sutton Place).
