= Grouse Mountain =

Mountain in British Columbia, Canada

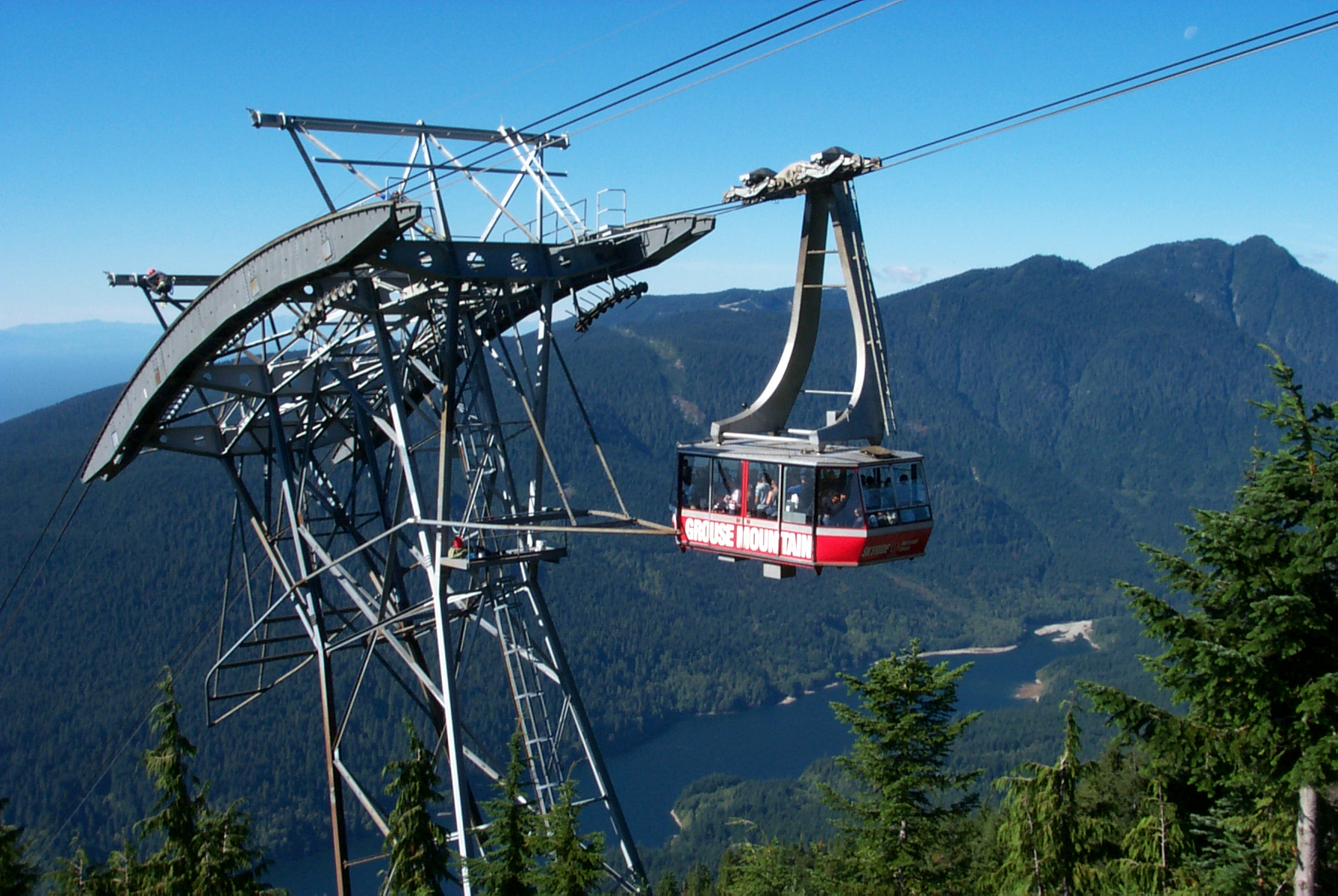
- Grouse Mountain Skyride
- Interactive map of Grouse Mountain
- Location: British Columbia, Canada
- Nearest city: North Vancouver
- Coordinates: 49°22′46.40″N 123°4′54.49″W
- Vertical: 365 m (1,198 ft)
- Top elevation: 1,231 m (4,039 ft)
- Base elevation: 274 m (899 ft)
- Skiable area: 212 acres (86 ha)
- Trails: 33 (14 night skiing); 17% beginner 54% intermediate 21% advanced 8% expert
- Lift system: 4 chairlifts 1 magic carpet
- Website: www.grousemountain.com

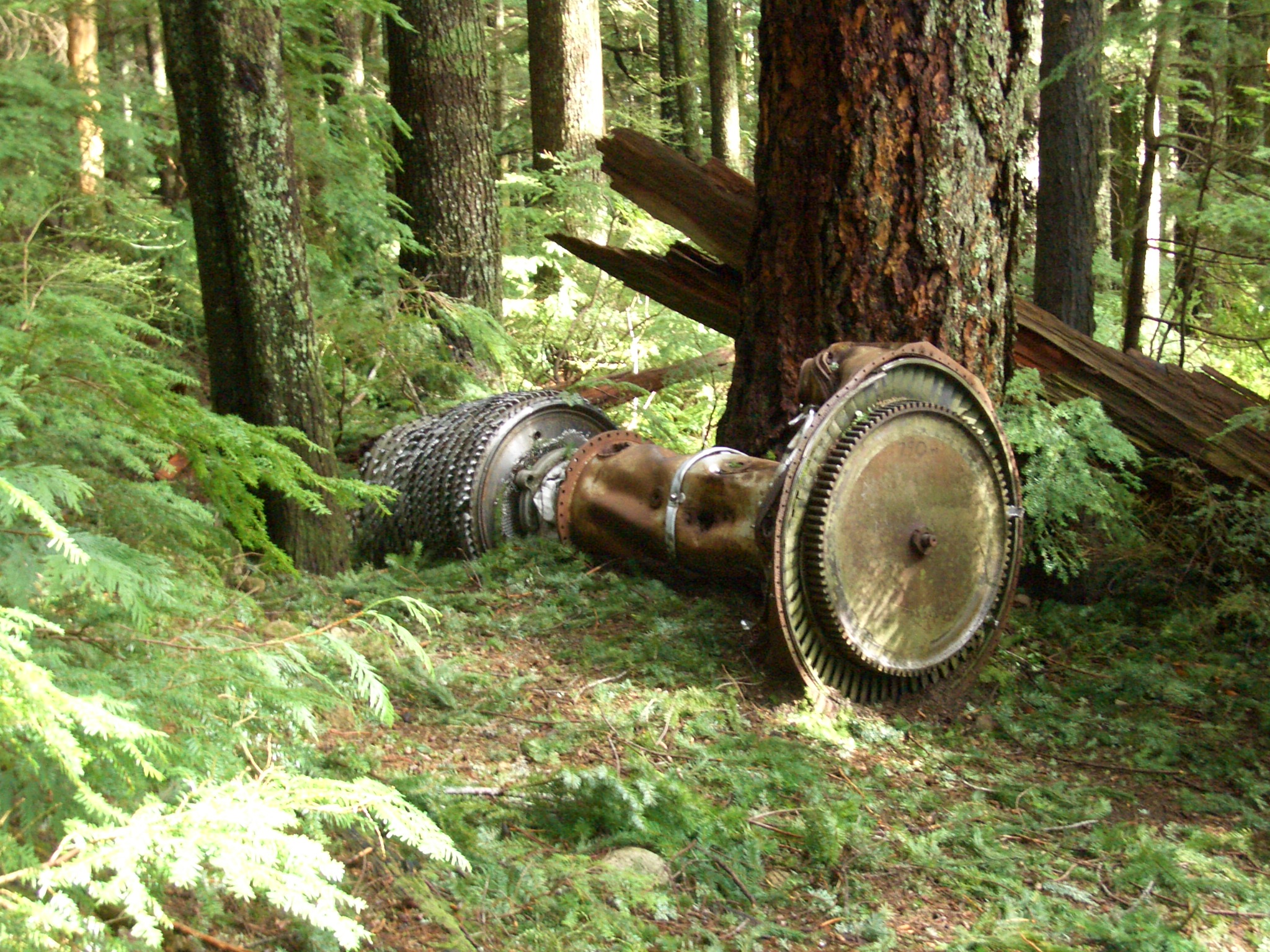
An abandoned aircraft engine, remaining near the old chairlift route and the 1954 F-86 crash site

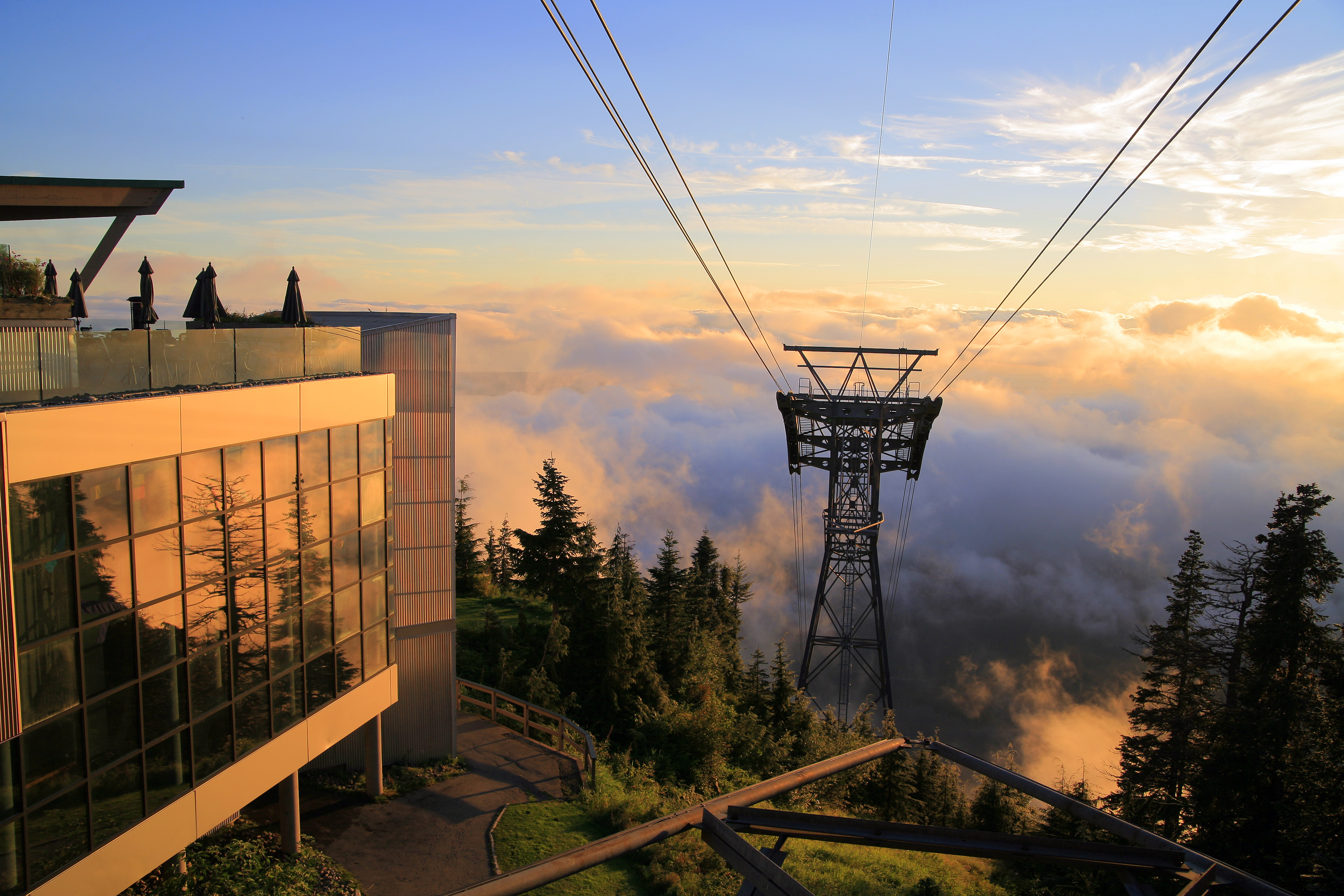
Sun setting on the modern-day mountaintop chalet and lodge (left) as seen from the cable car's passenger gate

Grouse Mountain is one of the North Shore Mountains of the Pacific Ranges in the District Municipality of North Vancouver, British Columbia, Canada. With a maximum elevation of over 1,200 m (4,100 ft) at its peak, the mountain is the site of an alpine ski area, Grouse Mountain Resort, which overlooks Metro Vancouver and has four chairlifts servicing 33 runs.

== History ==
=== Original ski area ===
Grouse Mountain gets its name from the sooty grouse commonly found throughout the mountain. The mountain is situated on the traditional territories of the Coast Salish peoples. The first recorded non-Indigenous hikers to reach its peak in October 1894, named the mountain after the sooty (blue) grouse, a game bird of the area.

Grouse Mountain's first lodge was hand-built by Scandinavians in the 1920s. They hauled planks up what would become the Grouse Grind hiking trail for the venture. Another company wanted to build a funicular railway for a private resort on the mountain, though that venture never materialized. By the 1930s, a toll road was built to the top via the slope of what is now the mountain's primary ski run, the "Cut", to access the lodge.

The area at the bottom of the "Cut" is the original base of the mountain, where the area's first lodge and rope tow were built. Since several cottages were constructed in the trees surrounding the lodge and the base of the old Cut chairlift, the base came to be known as the "Village" by local skiers. These cabins are situated beneath and to the west of the former Cut chairlift, where some of them are still in use. The old Grouse Mountain Highway, a gravel road that was constructed to provide access to the base, is still in place and is today solely used for ski area upkeep.

In 1949, the mountain's first double chairlift was constructed, allowing skiing down the cut from the top of the ridge. Grouse Mountain claims this lift to have been the world's first double chairlift, however, it was actually the second chairlift in Vancouver after the "Hollyburn" at Cypress Bowl and the third in Canada after Red Mountain Resort; the first chair in the world was at Sun Valley in 1936. Two years later, in 1951, another a longer lift, running from a bus stop on Skyline Drive, at the bottom of the mountain, was opened, known as the Village Chair. This two seater chairlift included wooden towers (some of these towers and the lift line cable wheels are still visible on a hike following the Village Chair's lift line). Each of the chairs were, for a time, equipped with a metal roof to keep skiers dry on rainy or snowy days during the ride up to the base of the old Cut Chair lift.

==== Present-day lodge and ski area ====
After a fire destroyed the original lodge in the winter of 1962, the two original lifts were removed in the 1970s. The government of British Columbia, seeing the possibilities for tourism, provided funding and permits for a new lodge to be built on the ridge, as well as an aerial tramway travelling to the mountaintop from the valley below. The tramway, known as the Blue Tram, was built by Austrian steel company Voestalpine and was opened and inaugurated on December 15, 1966, by Premier W. A. C. Bennett.

Ten years later, the mountain was purchased from its original owners by the McLaughlin family in 1976. The new ownership provided additional funding for the construction of a second aerial tramway, built by Garaventa, known as the Red Tram or the Super Skyride, that same year. The Super Skyride, using much larger tram cars holding just under 100 passengers, is now the main tram, arriving at a separate top terminal building a short walk from the lodge. The older Blue Tram is now mainly used to transport supplies directly to the lodge structure.

The Peak and Blueberry Chairs, which were both created in the 1960s and early 1970s, as well as the additional Inferno Chair, which was built in 1976, were featured in the new ski area. The McLaughlin family had only partial ownership of the mountain until they acquired complete ownership in 1989. They then expanded the current lodge to build a high-definition theater, known as the Theatre in the Sky, in 1990.

As the Inferno, Blueberry and Peak Chairs began to age in the 2000s, all three lifts were removed due to insurance issues, beginning with the Inferno in late 2003 and the Blueberry and Peak the following year. All three were effectively replaced by Grouse Mountain's second high-speed and detachable quad chair built by North American aerial lift manufacturer Leitner-Poma for the 2005 winter season (the first was the Screaming Eagle on the Cut). The chair was named the Olympic Express in commemoration of Vancouver's recent designation for the 2010 Winter Games. Although no official 2010 Olympic events were held on the mountain (snowboard and freestyle ski races took place at the Cypress Mountain Ski Area a few kilometres to the west), during the Games, NBC Today broadcast its coverage of the games live from Grouse Mountain.

In 2008, Grouse Mountain constructed two new quad chairs; one to replace the Courtesy rope tow at the bottom of the Paradise run and the other to replace the defunct Peak chair, which closed after the Olympic Express was built in 2004.

Northland Properties acquired the resort in January 2020 from CM Asset Management, the owners of the resort since 2017.

In 2023, the mountain began construction on a new gondola project, featuring an 8-person cabin design and 27 cabins, to increase upload capacity. The Blue Grouse Gondola opened on December 12, 2024. This project is one of three planned for the 2024-25 winter and summer season, the others being a lift-access bike park and a mountain coaster.

== Climate ==
Grouse Mountain has an humid continental climate (Köppen climate type Dfb), falling exactly on the borderline with subarctic climate (Köppen Dfc).

The average annual precipitation is 2730mm. Autumn is the wettest season with 421.4 mm (16.59 in) of precipitation falling in November alone. Winters are cool and snowy, with an average of 868.7 centimetres (342.0 in) of snow falling annually.

Winters are not cold by Canadian standards, due to how the mountain is moderated by the Pacific Ocean. However, due to its elevation, winters are by no means as mild as the Lower Mainland. In December (the coldest month statistically), Grouse Mountain has an average high and low of 1.3 °C (34.3 °F) and −3.2 °C (26.2 °F) respectively. This freeze/thaw cycle can allow for large amounts of rain to fall on some occasions every winter. Nonetheless, heavy snow is more frequent in the winter, which allows for a deep snow-pack, lasting on average from mid-November until early May.

Summer is warm and relatively dry. August is the warmest month, with an average high and low of 17.7 °C (63.9 °F) and 10.3 °C (50.5 °F) respectively.

Climate data for North Vancouver (Grouse Mountain Resort) (1981–2010) (Elevation: 1,103m)
Month	Jan	Feb	Mar	Apr	May	Jun	Jul	Aug	Sep	Oct	Nov	Dec	Year
Record high °C (°F)	14.0 (57.2)	16.0 (60.8)	17.0 (62.6)	25.5 (77.9)	32.1 (89.8)	38.6 (101.5)	40.3 (104.5)	40.0 (104.0)	36.2 (97.2)	26.0 (78.8)	17.5 (63.5)	17.0 (62.6)	40.3 (104.5)
Mean daily maximum °C (°F)	1.9 (35.4)	2.5 (36.5)	3.6 (38.5)	6.7 (44.1)	10.2 (50.4)	13.6 (56.5)	16.9 (62.4)	17.7 (63.9)	14.9 (58.8)	8.5 (47.3)	3.3 (37.9)	1.3 (34.3)	8.4 (47.1)
Daily mean °C (°F)	−0.4 (31.3)	−0.1 (31.8)	1.0 (33.8)	3.6 (38.5)	6.9 (44.4)	10.0 (50.0)	13.2 (55.8)	14.1 (57.4)	11.4 (52.5)	5.9 (42.6)	1.0 (33.8)	−1.0 (30.2)	5.5 (41.9)
Mean daily minimum °C (°F)	−2.6 (27.3)	−2.6 (27.3)	−1.6 (29.1)	0.5 (32.9)	3.5 (38.3)	6.3 (43.3)	9.4 (48.9)	10.3 (50.5)	7.9 (46.2)	3.1 (37.6)	−1.2 (29.8)	−3.2 (26.2)	2.5 (36.5)
Record low °C (°F)	−23.4 (−10.1)	−24.8 (−12.6)	−16.9 (1.6)	−12.8 (9.0)	−7.5 (18.5)	−1.7 (28.9)	−1.1 (30.0)	1.1 (34.0)	−2.2 (28.0)	−12.6 (9.3)	−18 (0)	−24.6 (−12.3)	−24.8 (−12.6)
Average precipitation mm (inches)	357.0 (14.06)	228.2 (8.98)	232.5 (9.15)	192.4 (7.57)	168.2 (6.62)	173.5 (6.83)	91.7 (3.61)	114.8 (4.52)	155.8 (6.13)	305.3 (12.02)	421.4 (16.59)	289.5 (11.40)	2,730.3 (107.49)
Average rainfall mm (inches)	185.9 (7.32)	103.4 (4.07)	93.1 (3.67)	90.0 (3.54)	155.5 (6.12)	173.2 (6.82)	91.7 (3.61)	114.8 (4.52)	155.4 (6.12)	292.1 (11.50)	301.0 (11.85)	105.5 (4.15)	1,861.5 (73.29)
Average snowfall cm (inches)	171.1 (67.4)	124.8 (49.1)	139.4 (54.9)	102.4 (40.3)	12.6 (5.0)	0.3 (0.1)	0.0 (0.0)	0.0 (0.0)	0.4 (0.2)	13.2 (5.2)	120.5 (47.4)	184.0 (72.4)	868.7 (342.0)
Average precipitation days (≥ 0.2 mm)	18.7	14.9	16.2	16.4	14.4	13.5	9.2	8.4	10.6	15.8	20.2	17.1	175.1
Average rainy days (≥ 0.2 mm)	7.7	6.1	6.1	8.5	13.5	13.5	9.2	8.4	10.6	14.8	11.5	4.7	114.4
Average snowy days (≥ 0.2 cm)	13.5	11.3	12.3	9.5	2.3	0.13	0.0	0.0	0.08	2.4	11.8	14.5	77.7
Source: Environment Canada

== The Eye of the Wind ==
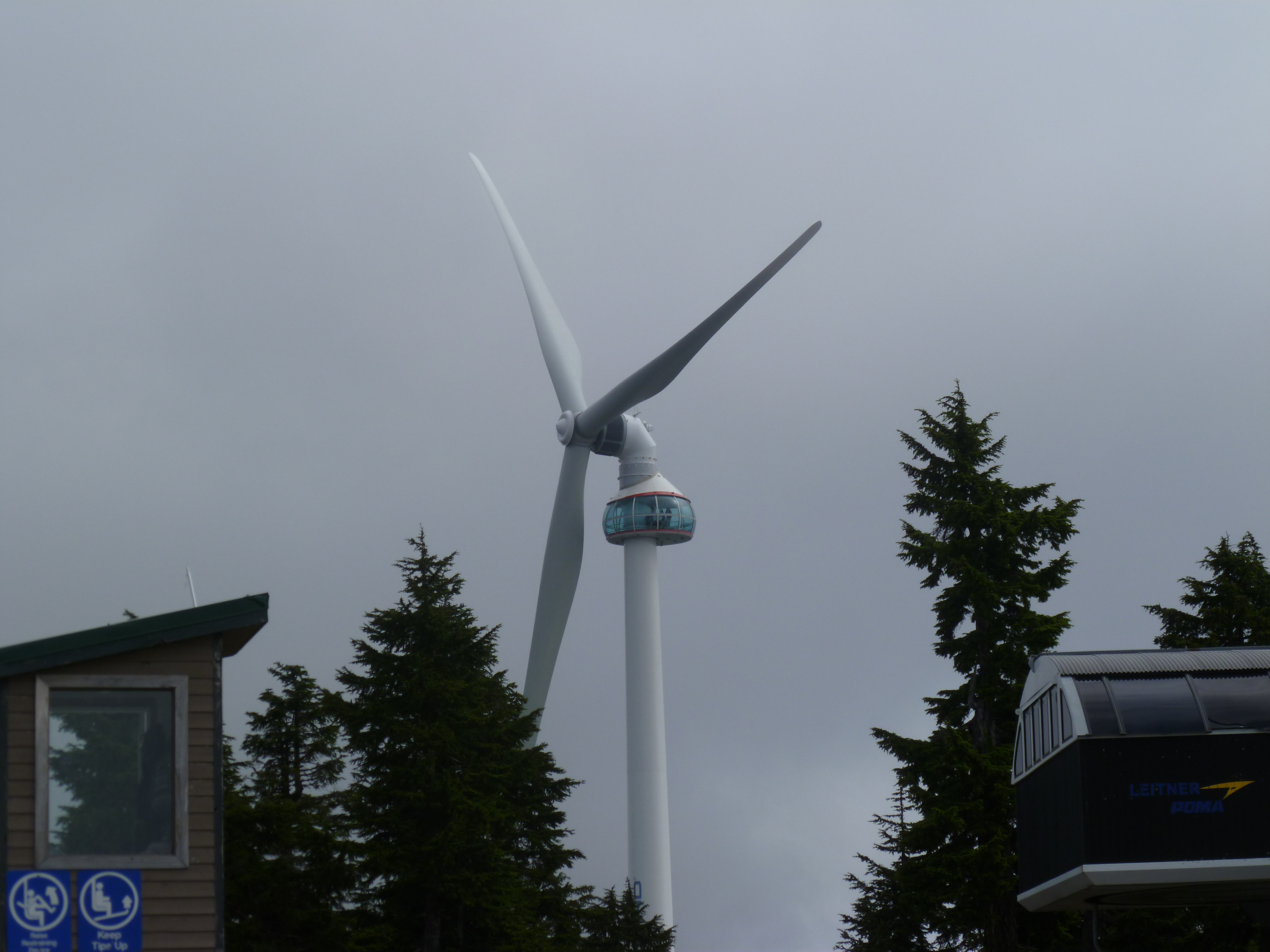
The 1.5 MW wind turbine

Grouse Mountain has built an observation deck on a 1.5 megawatt wind turbine of Leitwind LTW77-1500 type with 65 metres hub height and 76.8 metres rotor diameter at the peak of the resort. The facility, which is anticipated to eventually supply 25% of the resort's electricity, is the first wind turbine built in North America in a high altitude location. The design was recognized in the 2011 Consulting Engineers of British Columbia "Awards for Engineering Excellence".

Construction of the turbine began in September 2008 as a participation between Grouse Mountain and Italy's Leitwind Technology. It was inaugurated on February 5, 2010, by Premier of British Columbia Gordon Campbell prior to the 2010 Winter Olympics. Tours of the facility officially began on February 26, 2010, and the turbine was connected to BC Hydro's transmission system on September 22, 2010.

The turbine weighs more than 250 tonnes and rises 65 metres from its base to the top of the tower. Three 37.4 metre, fiberglass reinforced polyester blades sweep an area of 4,657 square metres.

The project has had its difficulties: a dispute with BC Hydro over safety equipment was not resolved until late 2010, so the project generated no useful power until then. The turbine is conspicuously visible from much of the city of Vancouver, and some are ambivalent about its effect on the skyline. There were also concerns about the rapidly moving turbine blades hitting wildlife, but as of 2015, no bird or bat deaths had been observed. The turbine foundation created a home for the American pika.

Questions were also raised about claims made by Grouse Mountain Resorts about the power generation capability of the mill, estimated by GMR at 25% of the resort's needs, or enough energy to power 400 homes.

=== Ski and snowboard ===
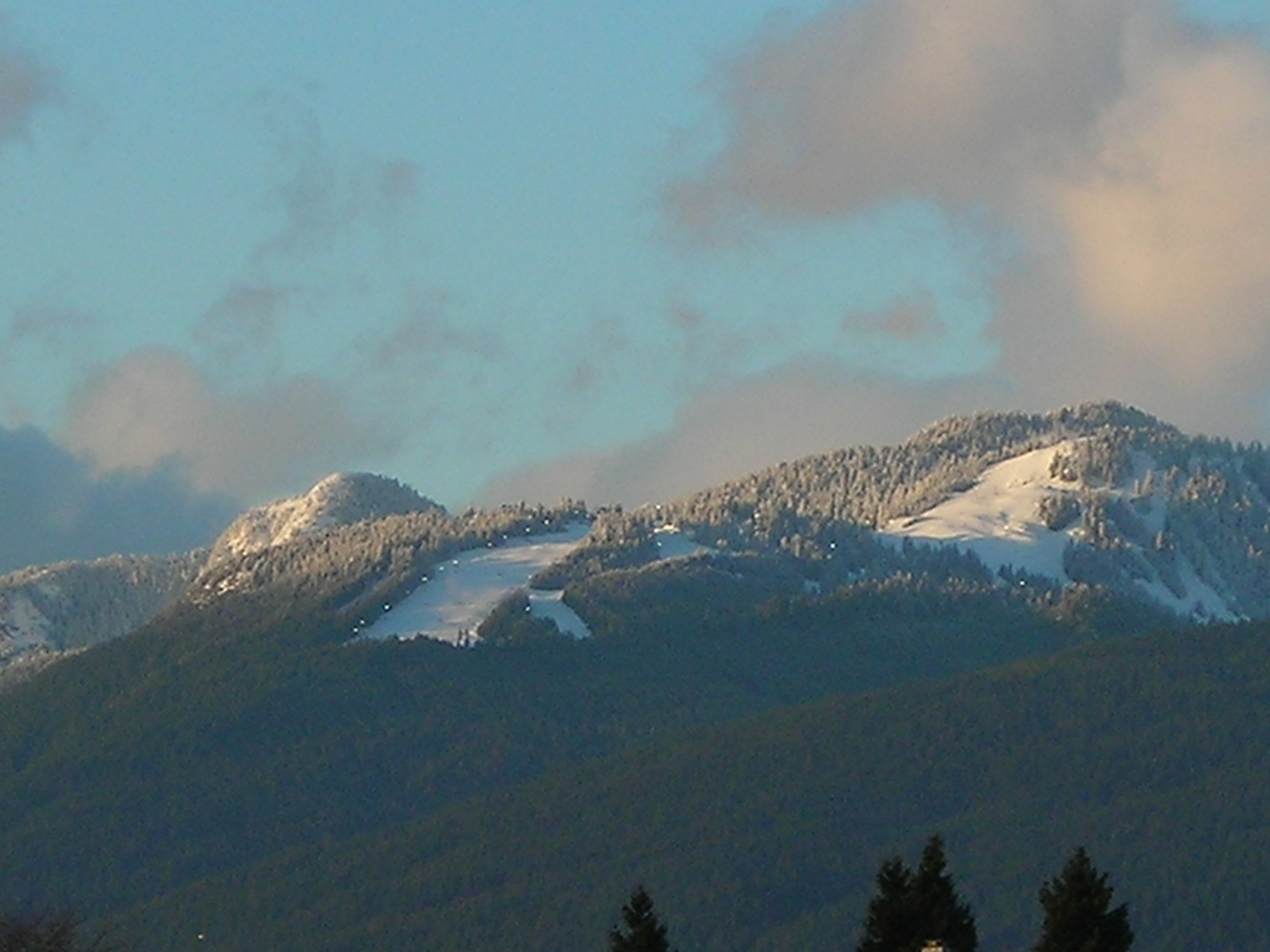
Grouse mountain's snow terrain, as seen from Burnaby, featuring the Cut (left) and expert peak runs (right)

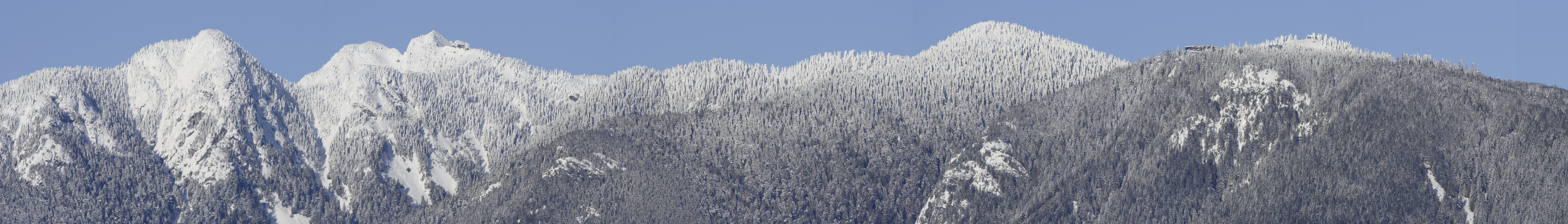
A panoramic view of Grouse Mountain in winter

The ski and snowboard area, located on the southern slope of the mountain, operates in the winter months between December and May, approximately. Accessed by taking the tram from the base to the mountaintop chalet and lodge, it features four chairlifts (two high-speed quads, the Screaming Eagle and Olympic Express; and two quads, the Greenway and Peak Chairs) facilitating 33 runs, half of which are lit for night skiing and snowboarding.

The most prominent run on the mountain is the Cut, one of two beginner runs, which is easily visible from the Vancouver area. It runs alongside the Screaming Eagle chairlift. East of the Cut are several intermediate runs, which take skiers and snowboarders down to the Olympic Express, which accesses the mountain's easternmost expert runs, most of which originate from the mountain's 1,231-metre (4,039 ft) peak. Altogether, Grouse Mountain features four green (beginner), sixteen blue (intermediate), seven black diamond (advanced) and three double black diamond (expert) runs. There are also three freestyle terrain parks—the novice to intermediate Rookie Terrain and Paradise Parks, as well as the intermediate to expert Side Cut Terrain Park. Depending on snow conditions, there is also another terrain park for experts called the Cut Jump Line, which is located on the left (east) side of the Cut. In 2022, a dedicated handle tow was built to service the Side Cut Terrain Park.

In addition to the 305 centimetres of annual natural snowfall, the mountain uses 37 snow guns, covering 75% of the ski and snowboard terrain, for artificial snowmaking.

== Summer operations ==
=== Grouse Grind ===
Grouse Mountain

Highest point
- Elevation: 1,231 m (4,039 ft)
- Prominence: 86 m (282 ft)
- Listing: Mountains of British Columbia
- Coordinates: 49°23′10″N 123°04′35″W

Geography
- Location: British Columbia, Canada
- Parent range: Howe Sound Group
- Topo map: NTS 92G6 North Vancouver

An elevation profile of the trail

Grouse Mountain is also the location of a popular hiking trail known as the Grouse Grind. It is a steep trail that climbs 853 m (2800 feet) from the gate and timer near the bottom of the trail to the "Grind Timer" at the top of the trail, a distance of 2.9 km (1.8 mi), with an average grade of 17° (31%) and short sections of up to 30° (58%). The total number of stairs is 2,830. The trail, nicknamed "Mother Nature's Stairmaster", is notoriously gruelling due to its steepness and mountainous terrain. Hikers, who often time themselves on the trail, reach the top in approximately 90 minutes on average although some who are very fit can finish in under 30 minutes. The Grouse Grind trail is closed by Metro Vancouver each winter usually from November to April or May, due to hazardous geotechnical and weather conditions, by means of a steel gate and security fence.

Don McPherson and Phil Severy built the Grind in the early 1980s as a 'climber's winter conditioning trail', unauthorised by the Greater Vancouver Regional District (now Metro Vancouver) or the owners of the nearby Grouse Mountain Resort. McPherson also supervised the FMCBC-sponsored first rebuild of the Grouse Grind in the early 1990s, which Grouse Mountain Resort assisted with. Between 2010 and 2015, the rebuild of much of the Grind as rock and wood stairs, plus annual trail maintenance, contributed to the length of the Metro Vancouver seasonal closure of the Grind for six to seven months during winter and spring. The land is owned by the Greater Vancouver Water District (GVWD) arm of Metro Vancouver, but as of May 1, 2017, 185 acres were designated a Metro Vancouver Regional Park.

The fastest recorded ascents as of February 2019 were:

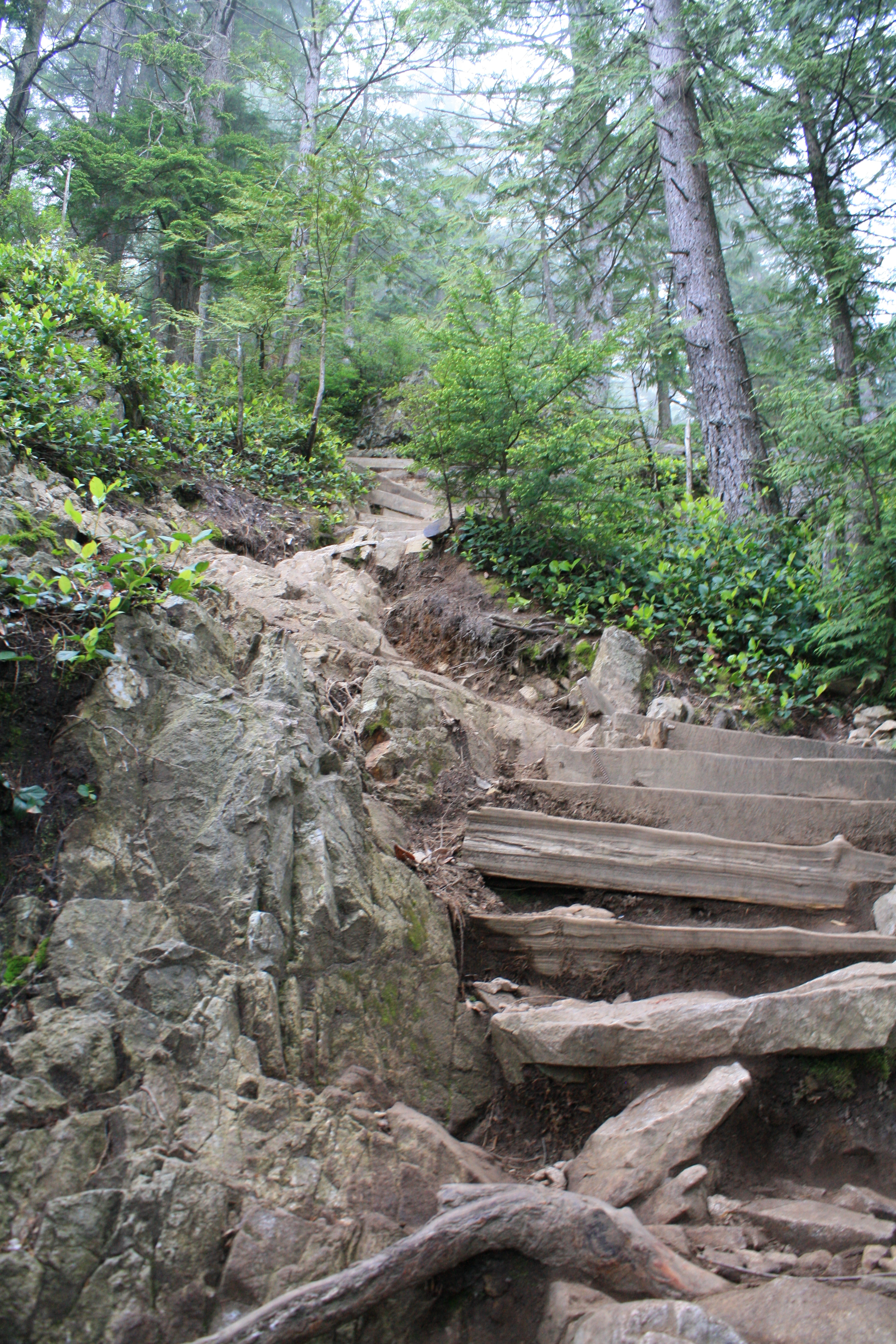
The Grouse Grind hiking trail

Event	Person	Time (min:sec)	Date
Overall Unofficial Record	Sebastian Salas	23:48	August 24, 2010
Annual Grouse Grind Mountain Run (Men's)	Sebastian Salas	25:01	September 19, 2010
Annual Grouse Grind Mountain Run (Women's)	Leanne Johnston	31:04	September 21, 2007

(The unofficial record is on the Grind Trail only, while there is a slight additional distance to the finish line for the Grind Mountain Run; the unofficial record was properly timed but on a shorter course.)

The Grouse Grind is a regular challenge primarily for BC residents, but also attracts challengers from around the world.

The current record holder for most grinds in one day is Wilfrid Leblanc who completed 19 grinds on June 22, 2019. Previous record holders include: Ian Robertson of Vancouver who completed 17 grinds on June 20, 2017; Oliver Bibby of Vancouver who completed 16 grinds on August 7, 2013; George Sterling with 15 grinds on October 5, 2011; Sebastian Albrecht of Vancouver completed the grind 14 times on June 29, 2010, and previously (shared with Vicki Mann) completing 13 climbs on June 22, 2009.

The start of the Grouse Grind was relocated in 2011 to a location on the Baden-Powell trail closer to the gate; previously it started on the B-P Trail 130 metres east of the gate (and timer), and the new position is only 20 metres east. Hikers wishing to use the original alignment can still find the original start point close to the BCMC Trail. The difficulty of the trail is often underestimated. The District of North Vancouver Fire and Rescue conducts many rescues each year of hikers who collapse on the Grouse Grind, or begin too late in the evening and are unprepared to find their way in the dark. As a result, in recent years the Grouse Grind gate has been closed to visitors 90 minutes before sunset each evening.

In order to avoid paying fare for the tram, climbers sometimes hike down the mountain as well. since the BCMC trail starts and ends roughly in the same location as the Grouse Grind trail; this can be done without disturbing upward climbers on the Grind. Hiking back down the Grouse Grind is prohibited.

== Photo gallery ==
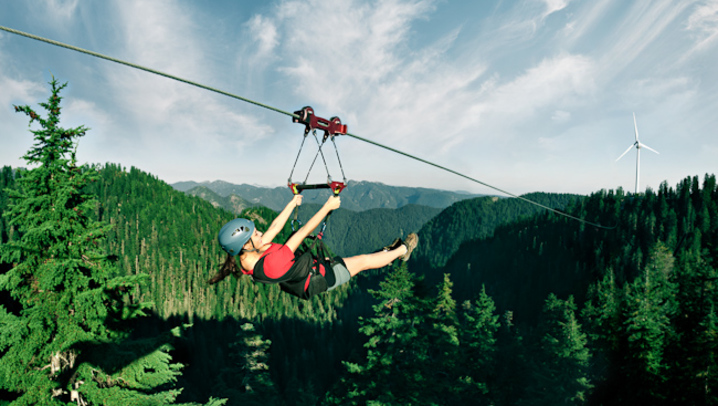
Mountain Zipline

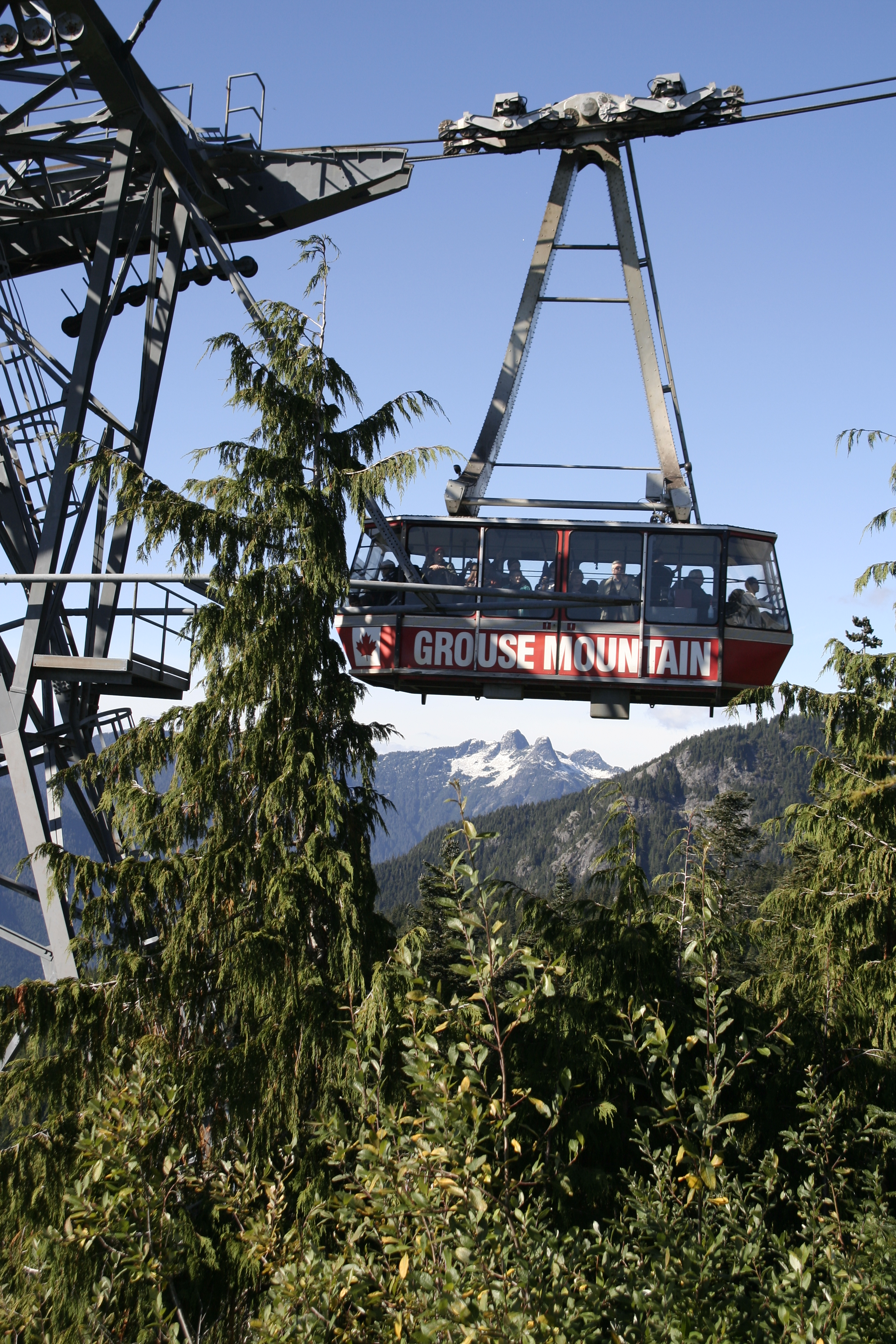
Skyride in October

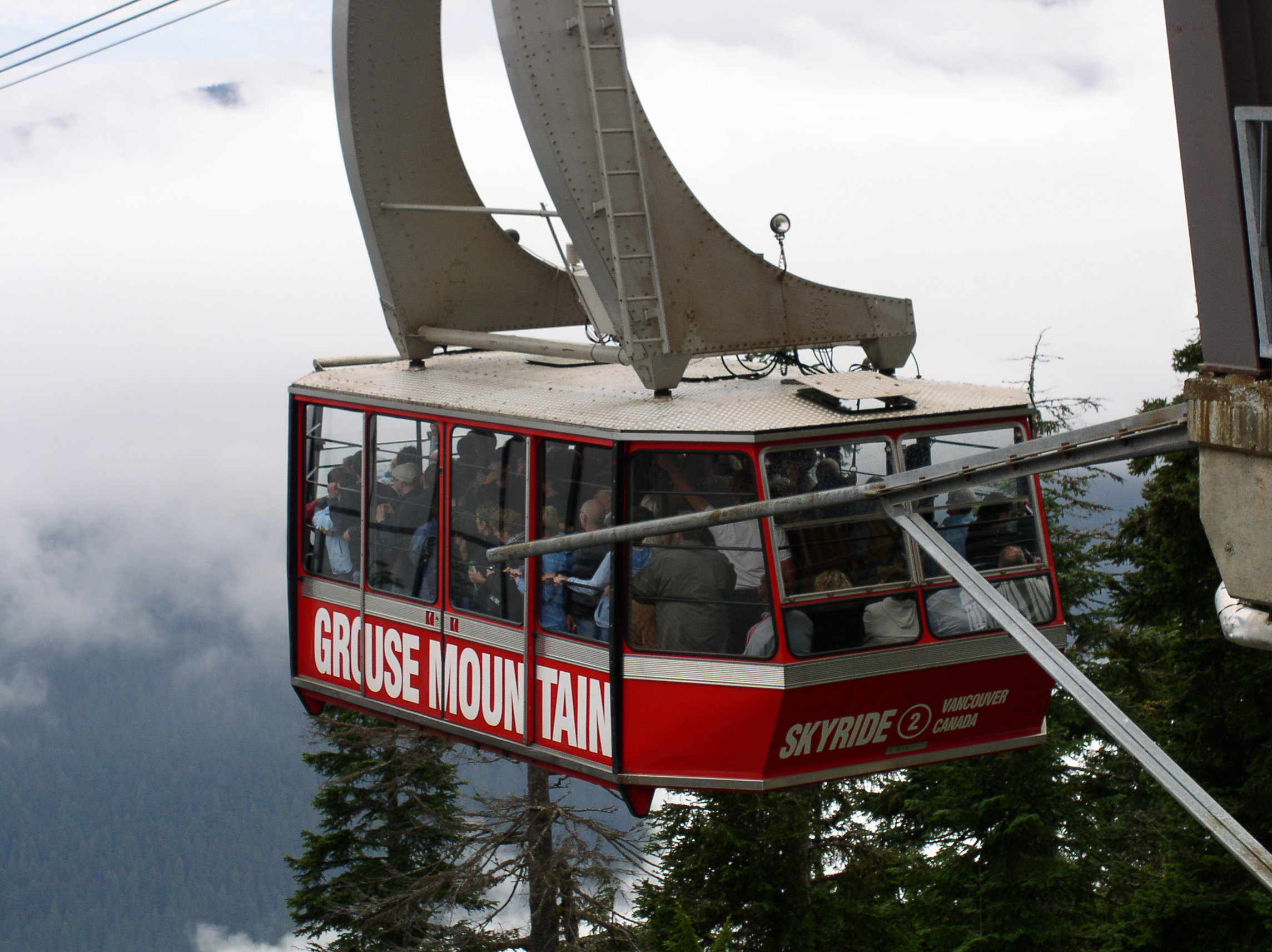
Closeup of the Skyride

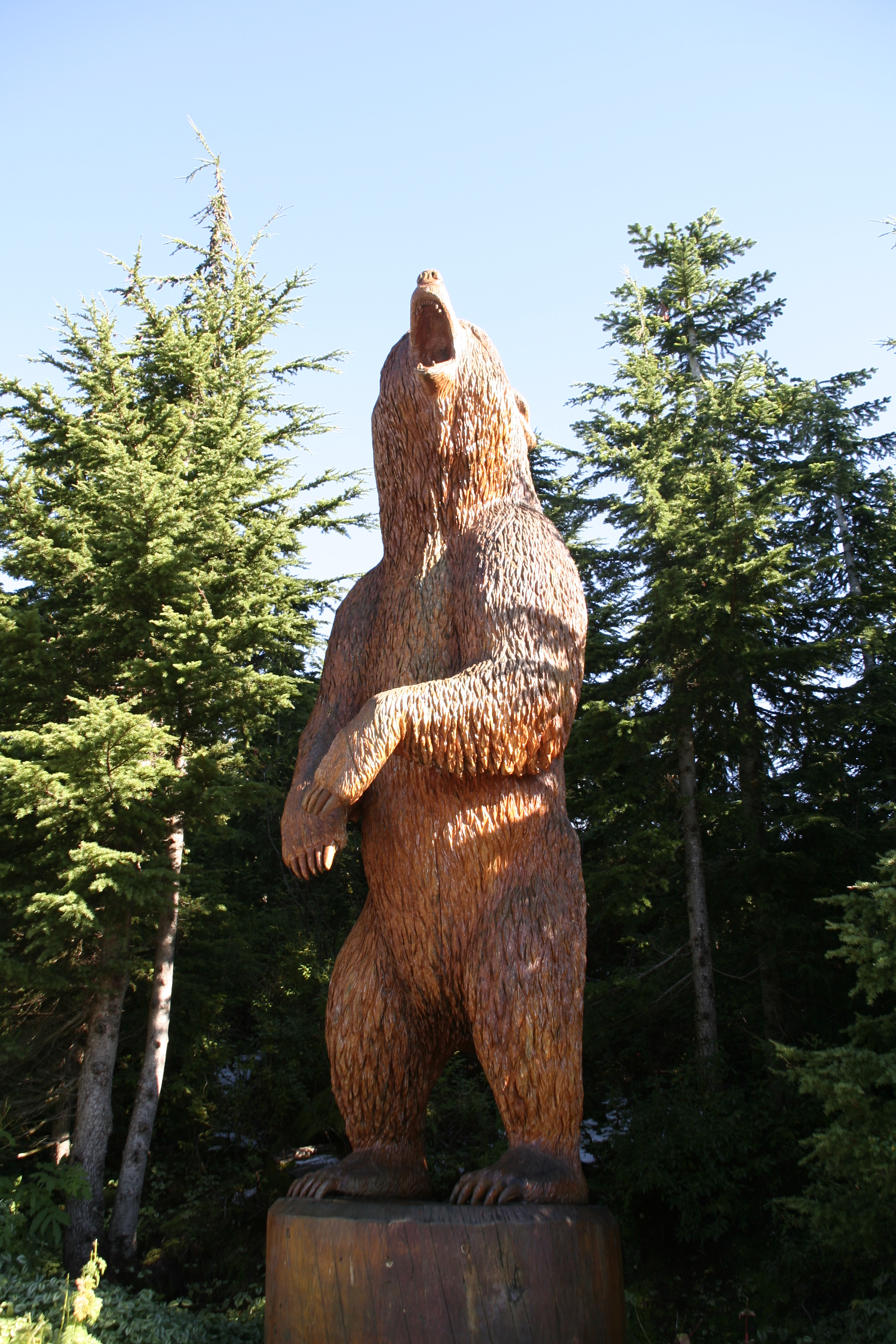
Wood carving (October)

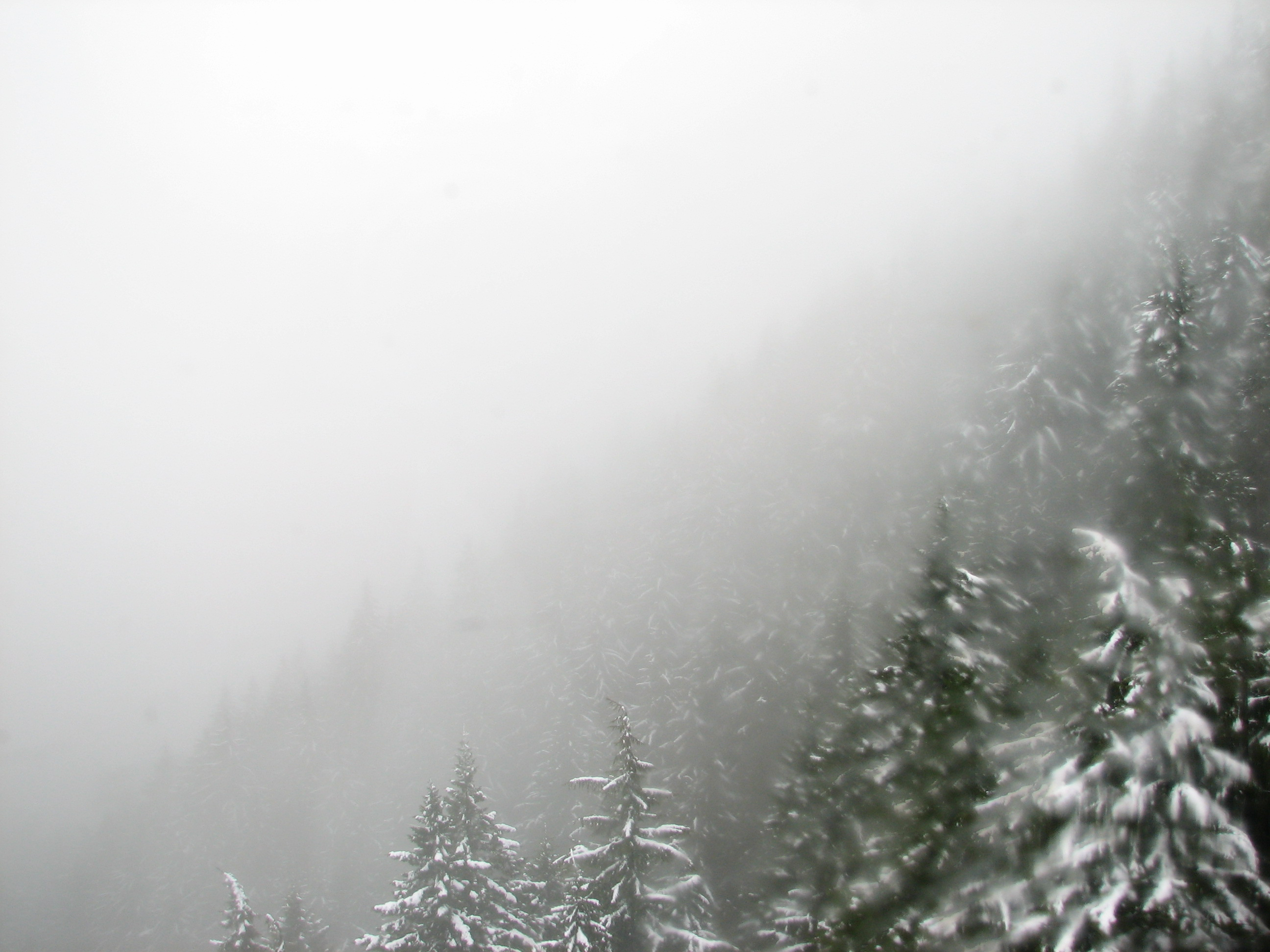
Trees

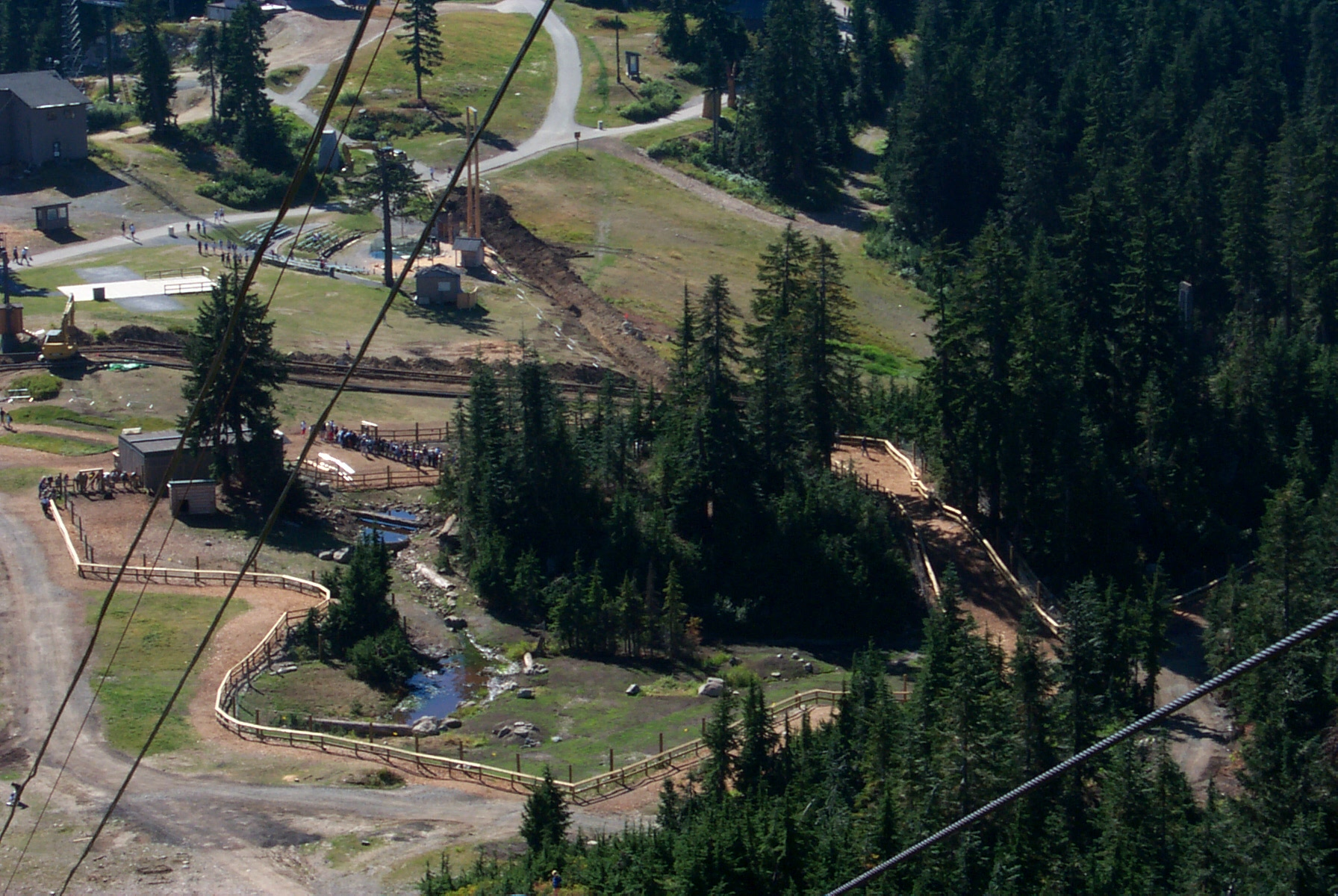
Bear habitat

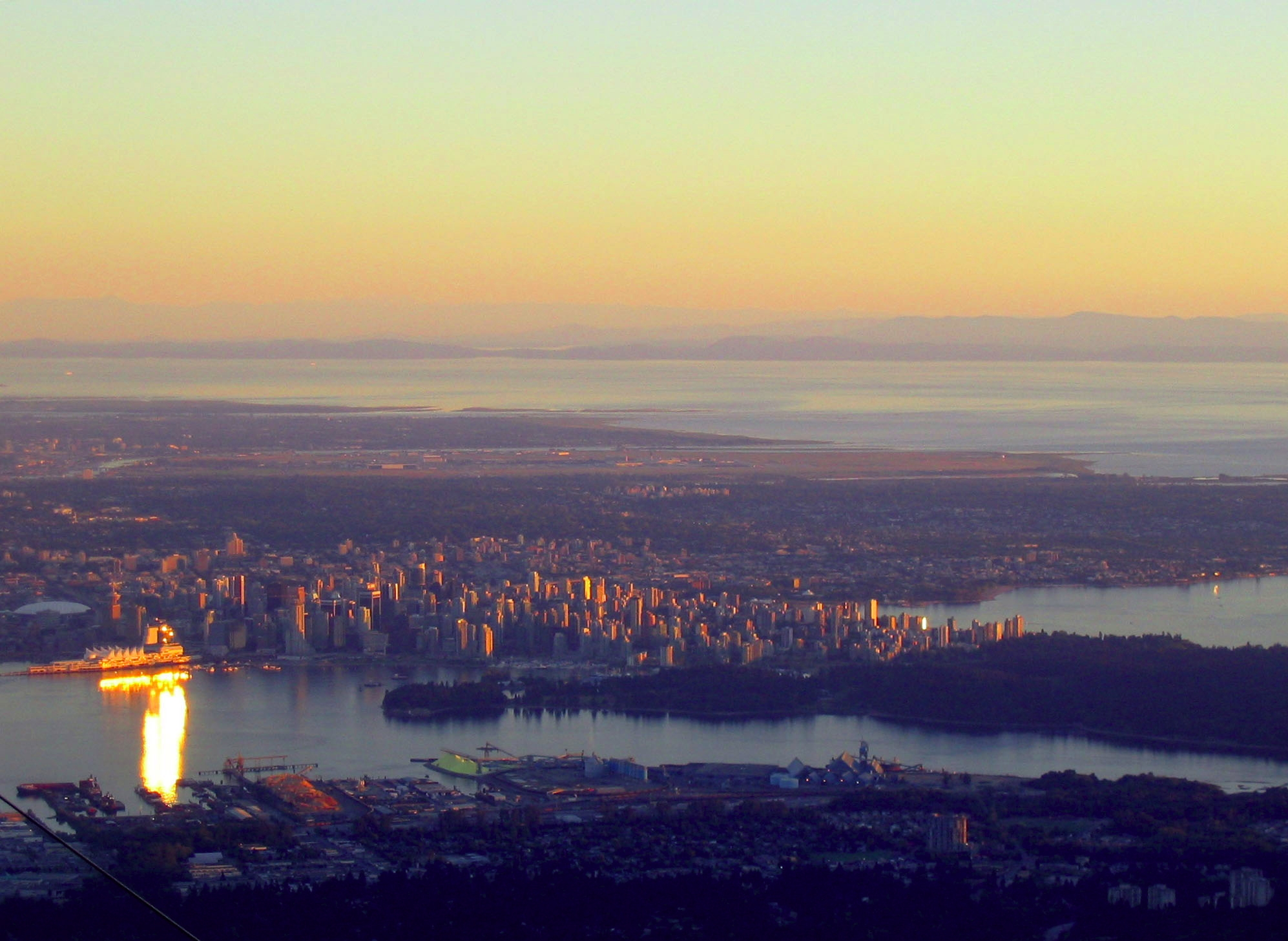
Vancouver as seen from Grouse mountain

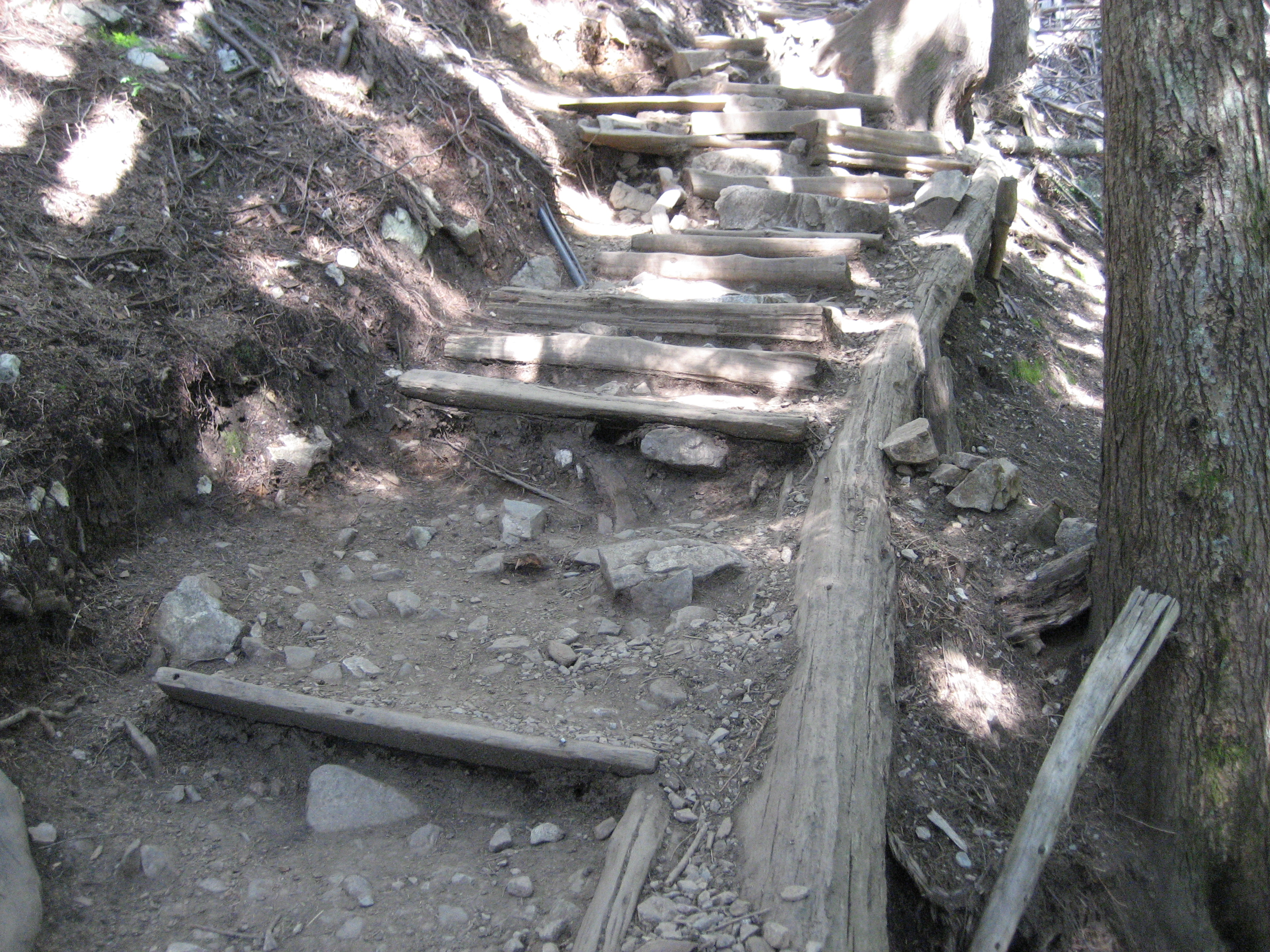
The Grouse Grind Trail

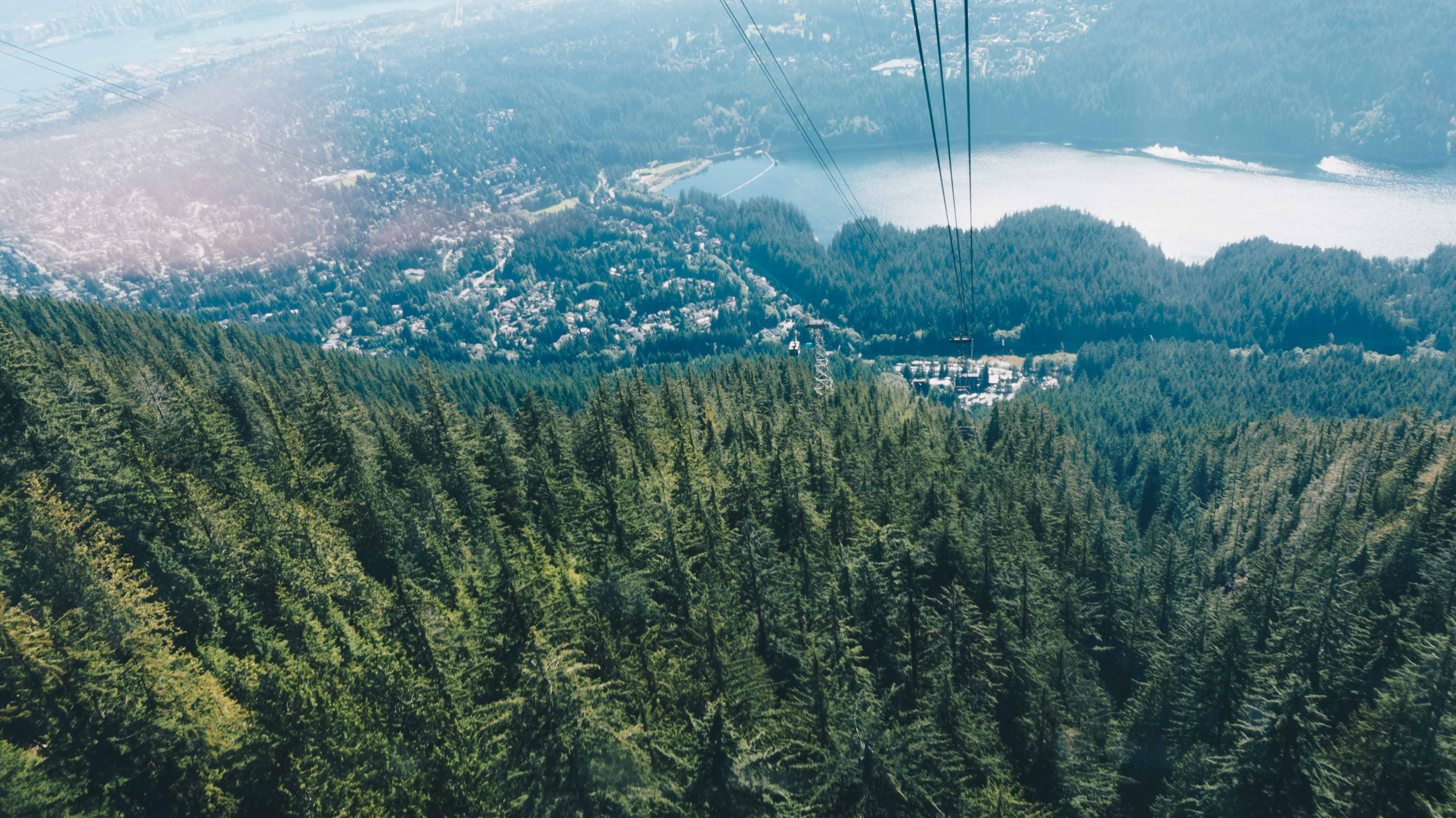
View of Grouse Grind and North Vancouver from the tram

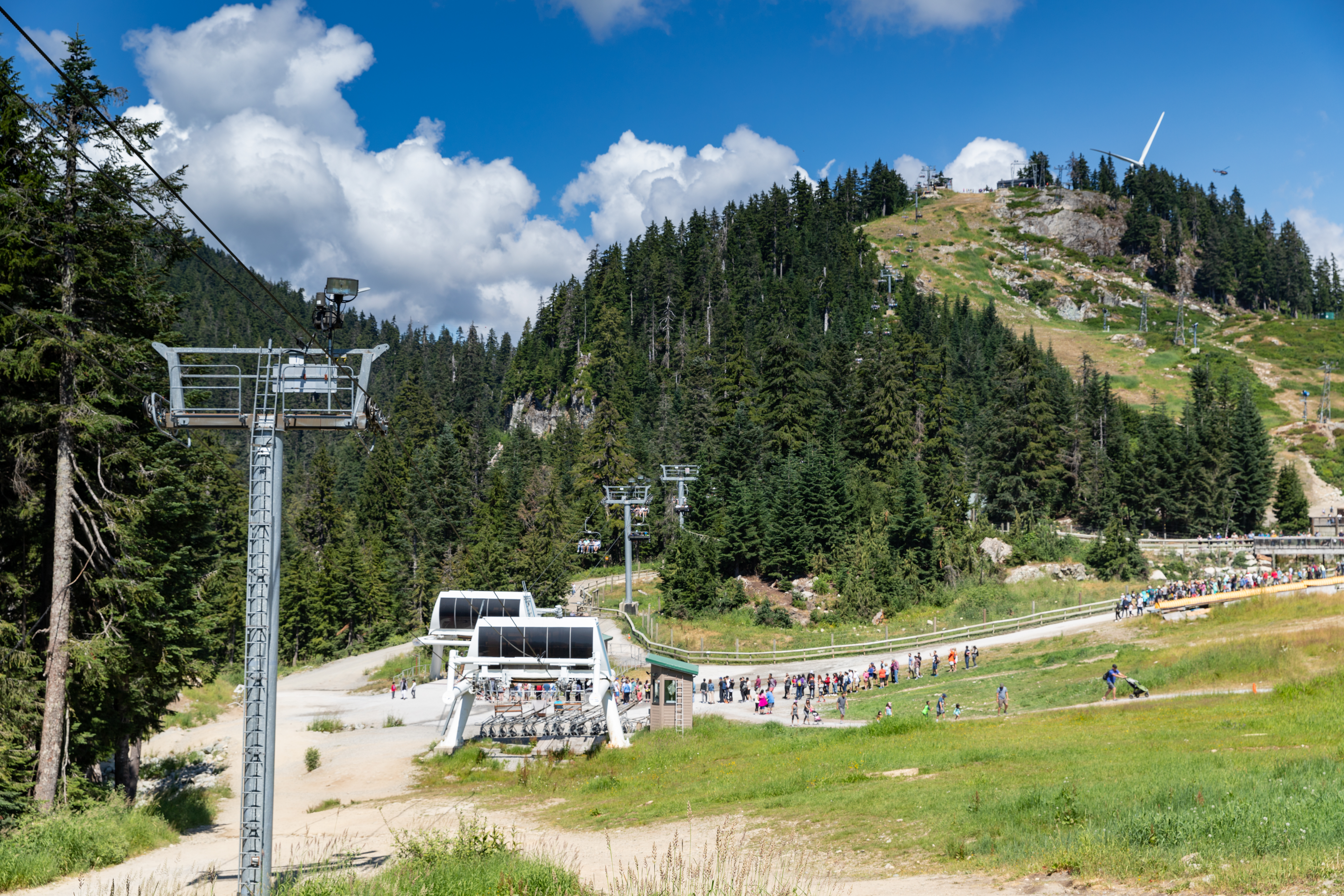
Grouse Mountain lift

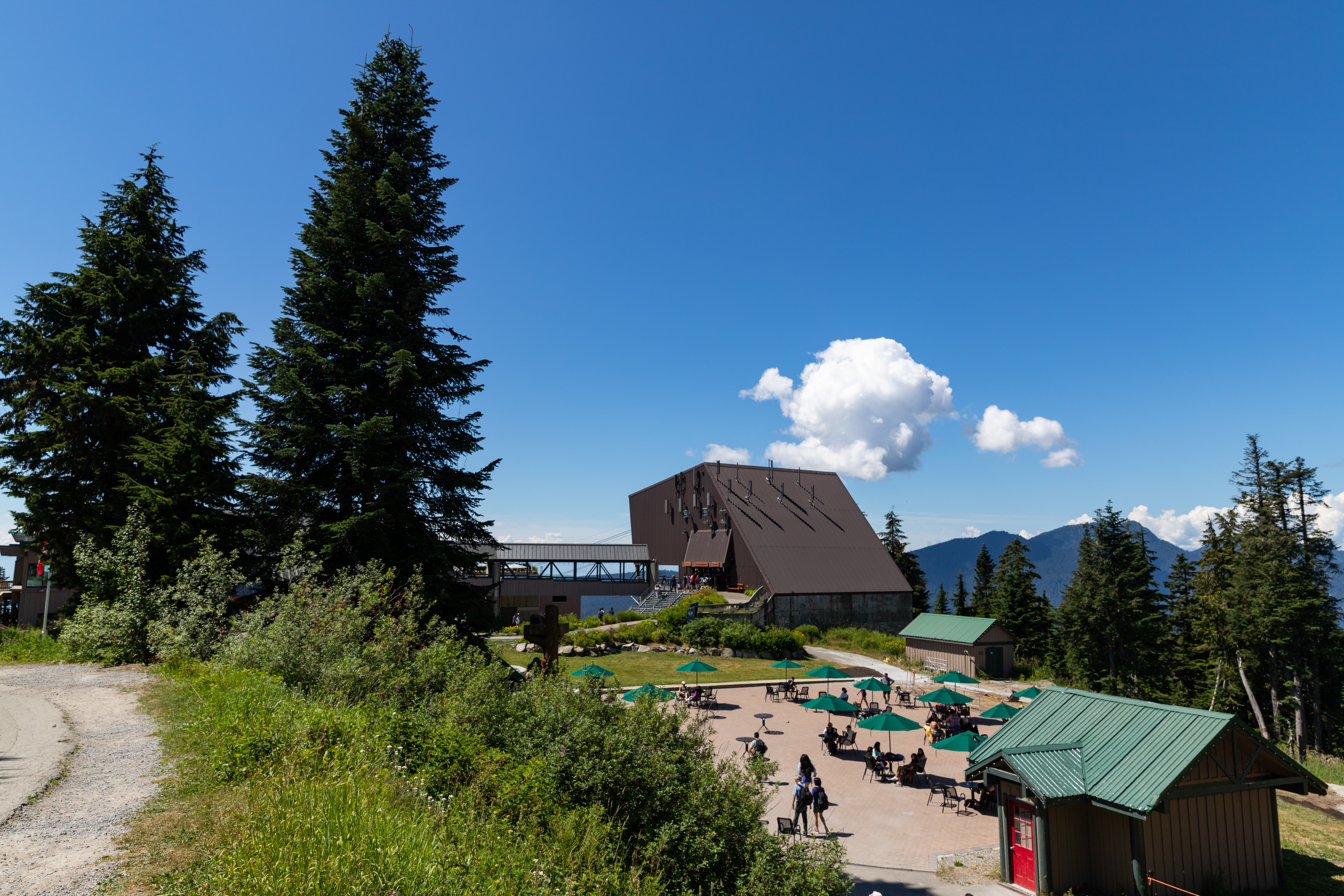
Grouse Mountain base station

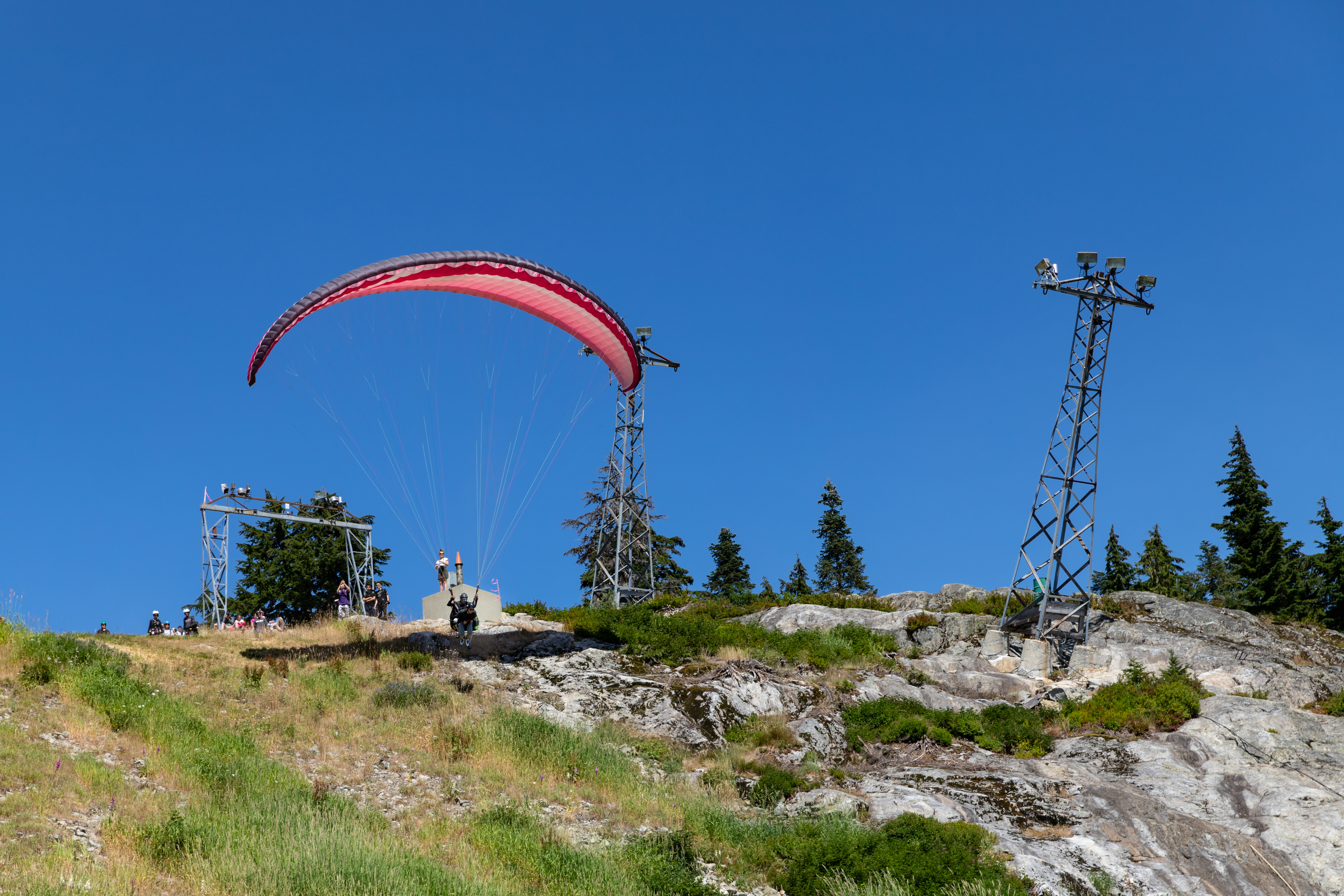
Paragliding on Grouse Mountain

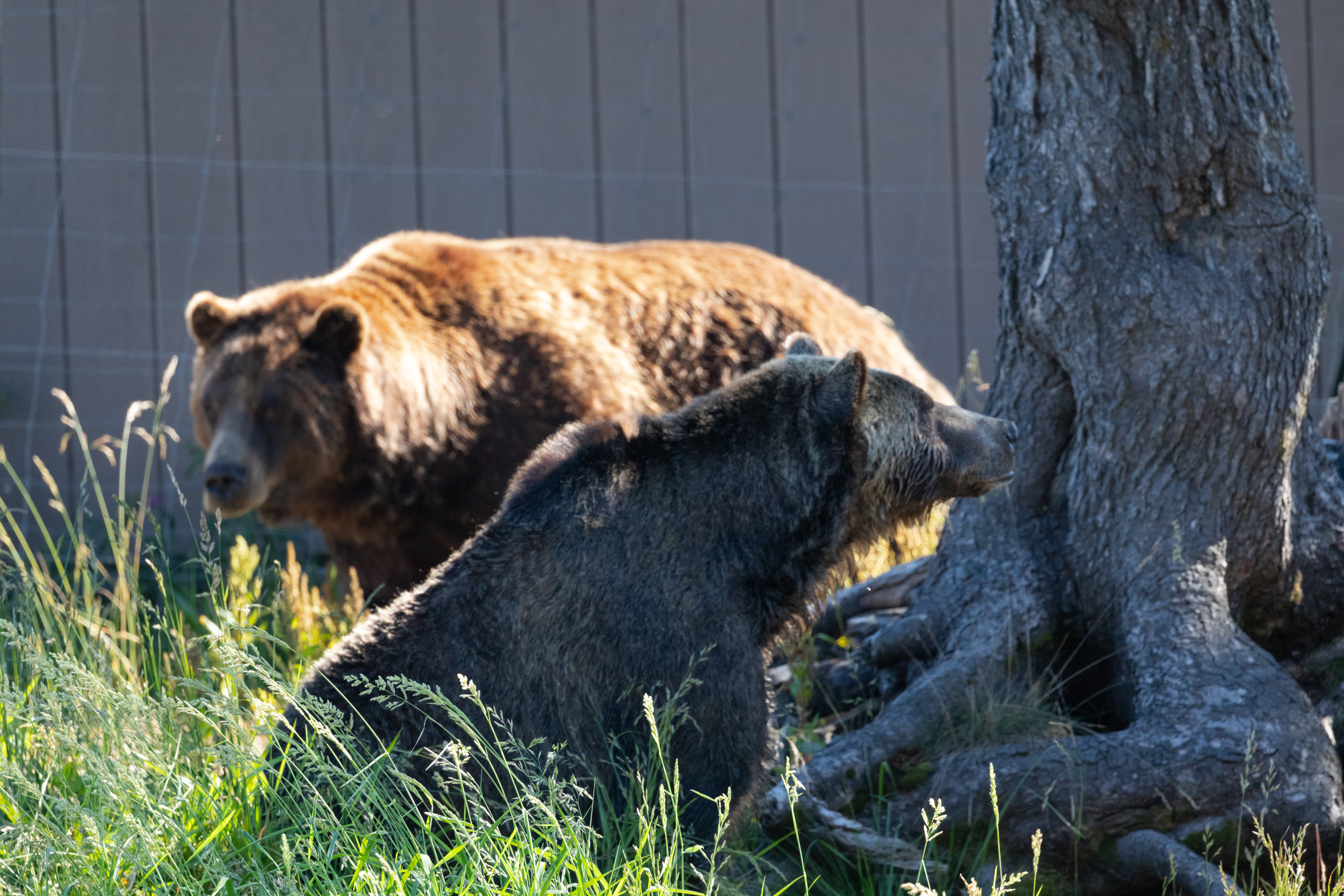
Grizzly bears Grinder and Coola, Grouse Mountain

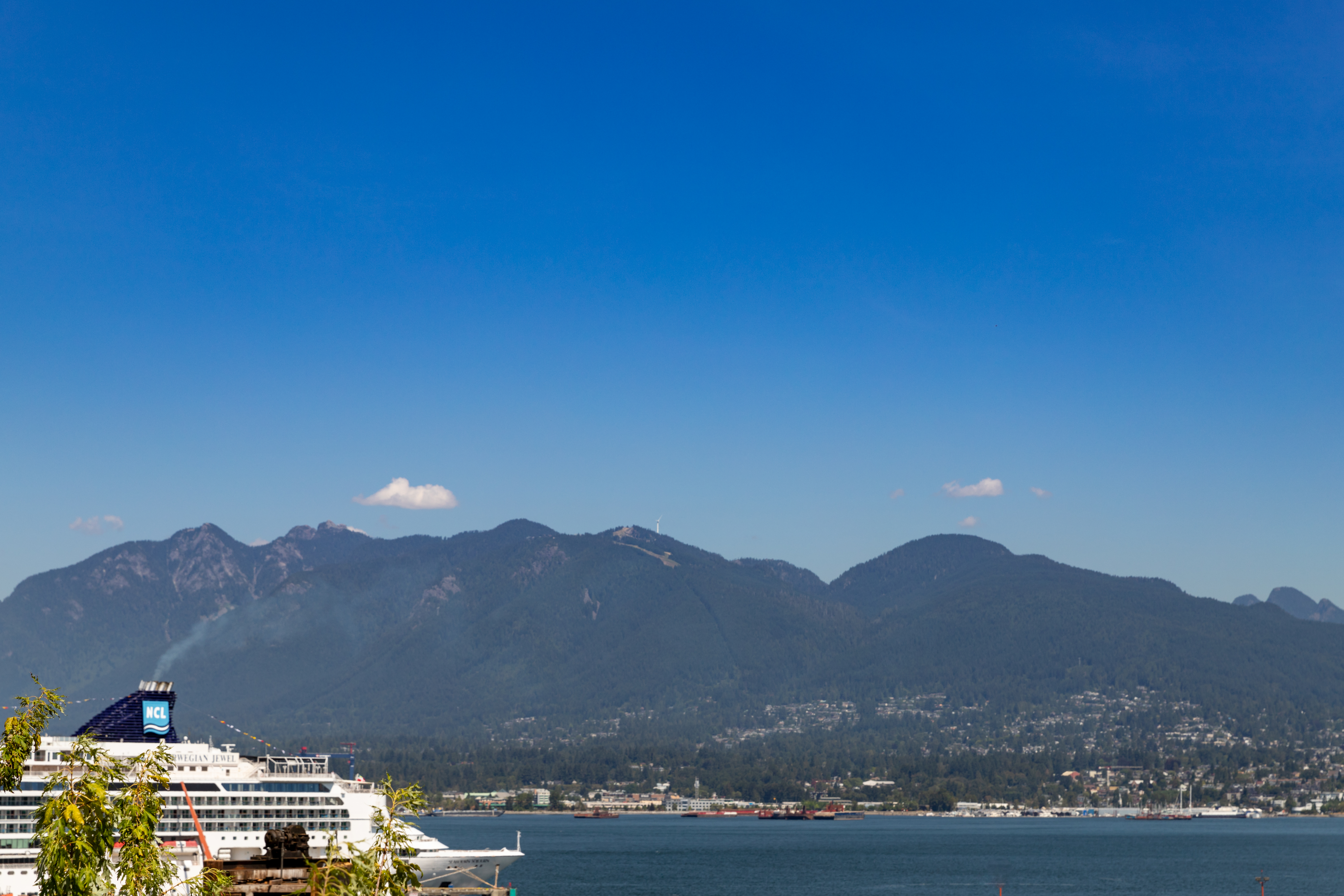
Grouse Mountain view from Vancouver

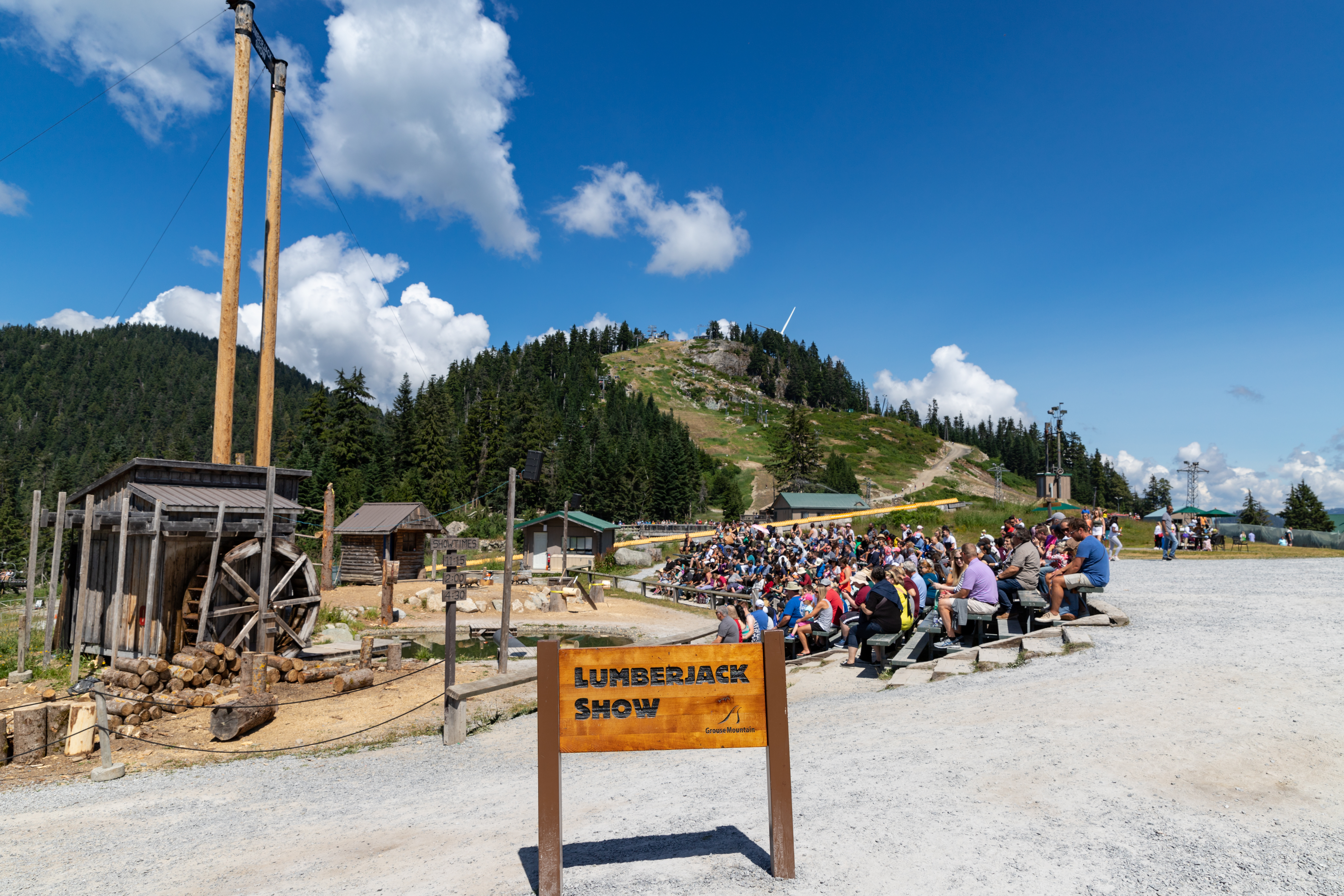
Lumberjack Show at Grouse Mountain

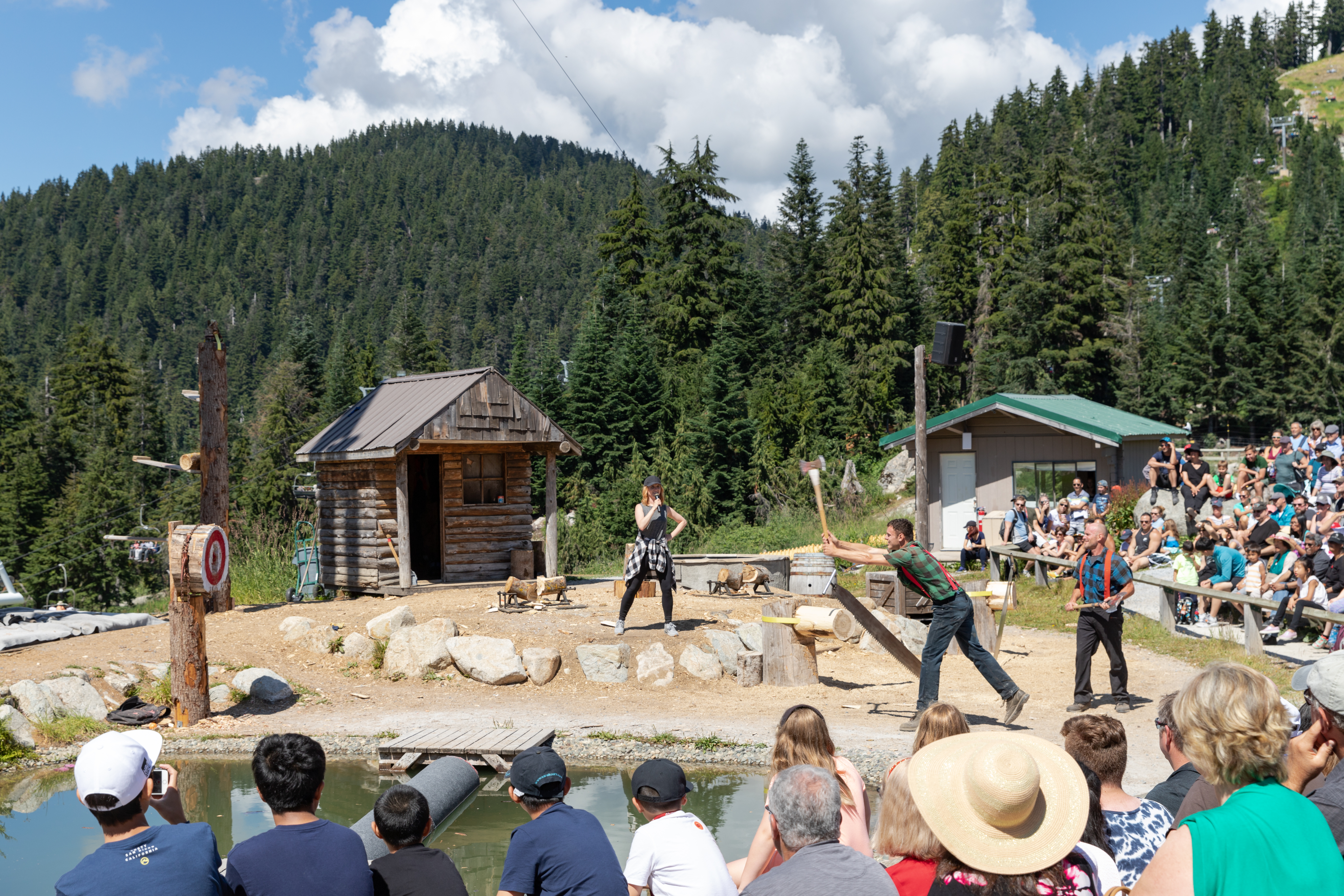
Grouse Mountain Lumberjack ax throwing competition

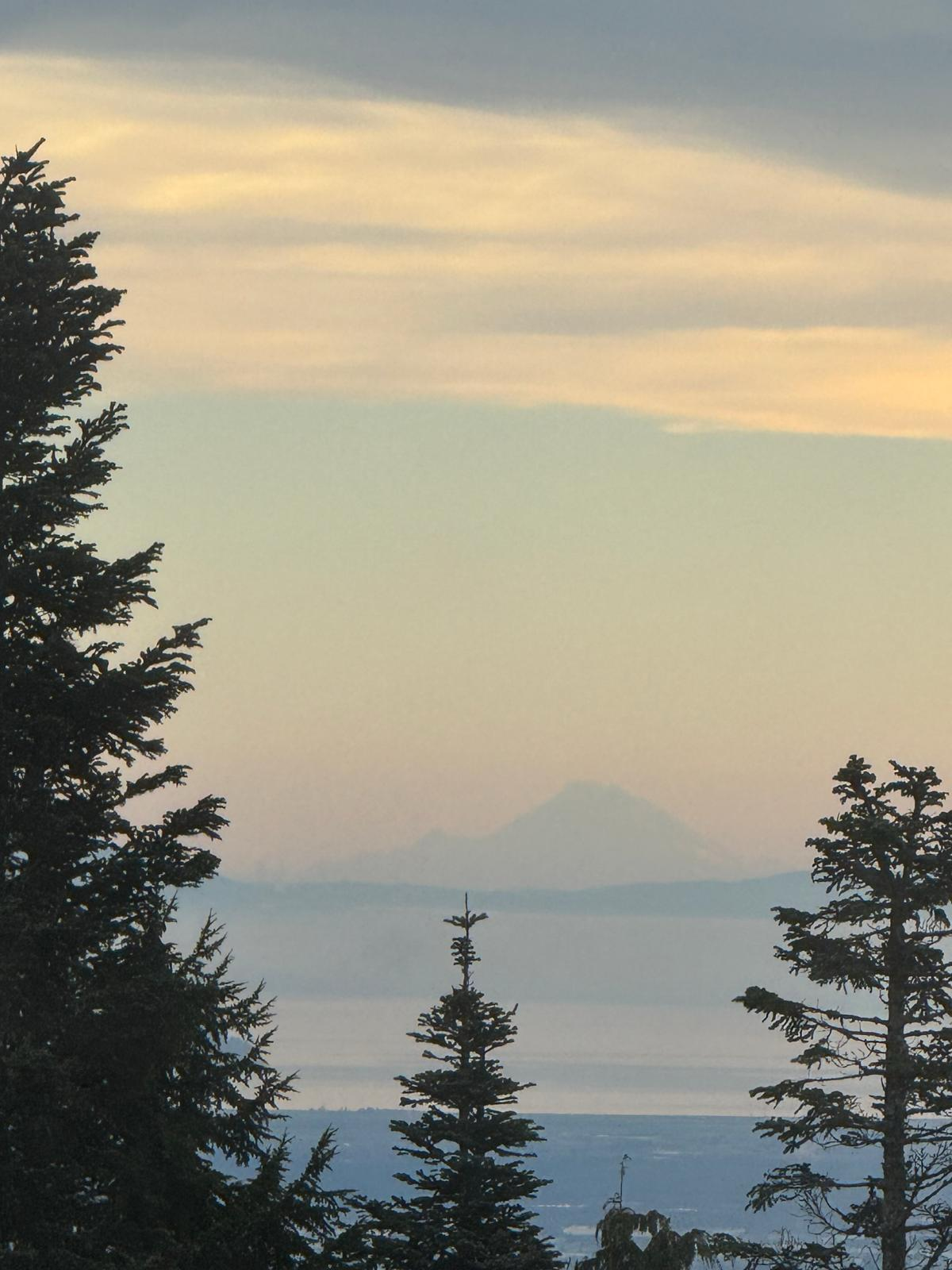
Mount Rainier in Seattle, WA seen from Grouse Mountain in Vancouver, BC on 13 December 2025 (Distance: 300 km (185 mile))

== Appearances in film and television ==
The aerial tramway used as a main plot point in the 1989 MacGyver episode "Cease Fire", standing in for Geneva, Switzerland.

Grouse Mountain and its aerial tramway stood in for the fictional "Skyland Mountain" in the Blue Ridge of Virginia, in the 1994 The X-Files episode "Ascension". Actor David Duchovny also dangled himself off the sky ride for a scene of the episode.

The Grouse Mountain ski lodge and facilities were used in the filming of the modern film adaptation of the popular cartoon Mr. Magoo.

Canadian singer-songwriter Nelly Furtado filmed the video for her single "Spirit Indestructible" on Grouse Mountain.

Grouse Mountain was used for the filming of the midseason finale of the third season of Arrow, "The Climb", serving as the location of the duel between Oliver Queen and Ra's al Ghul.

Grouse Mountain was used as the fictional ski resort "Summit Peaks" in the movie American Pie Presents: The Book of Love.

== See also ==
- North Shore Mountains
- Pacific Ranges
- Cypress Mountain Ski Area
- Mount Seymour
