= Sutton Place Hotel Vancouver =

Luxury hotel in Vancouver, British Columbia

The Sutton Place Hotel Vancouver
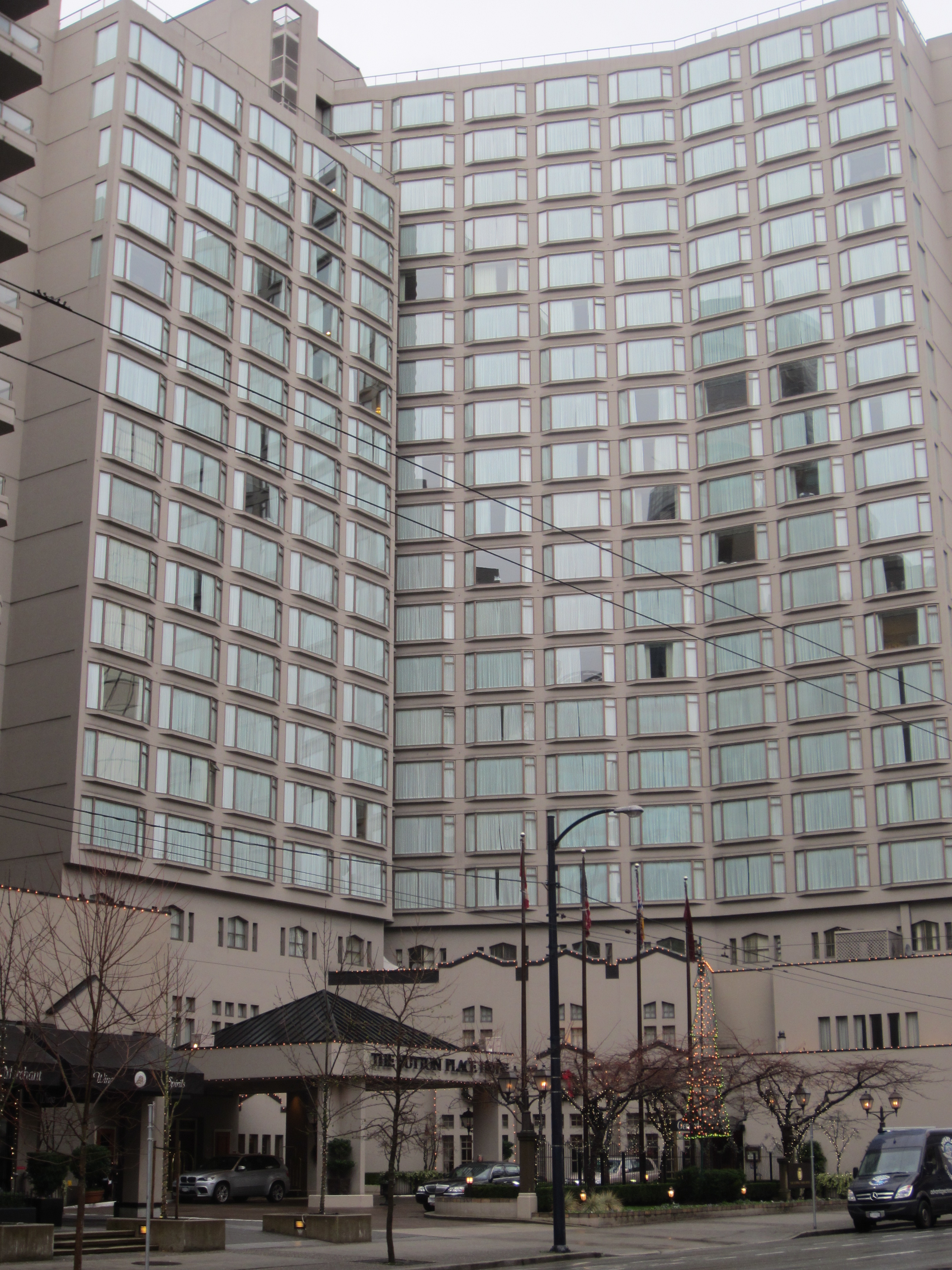

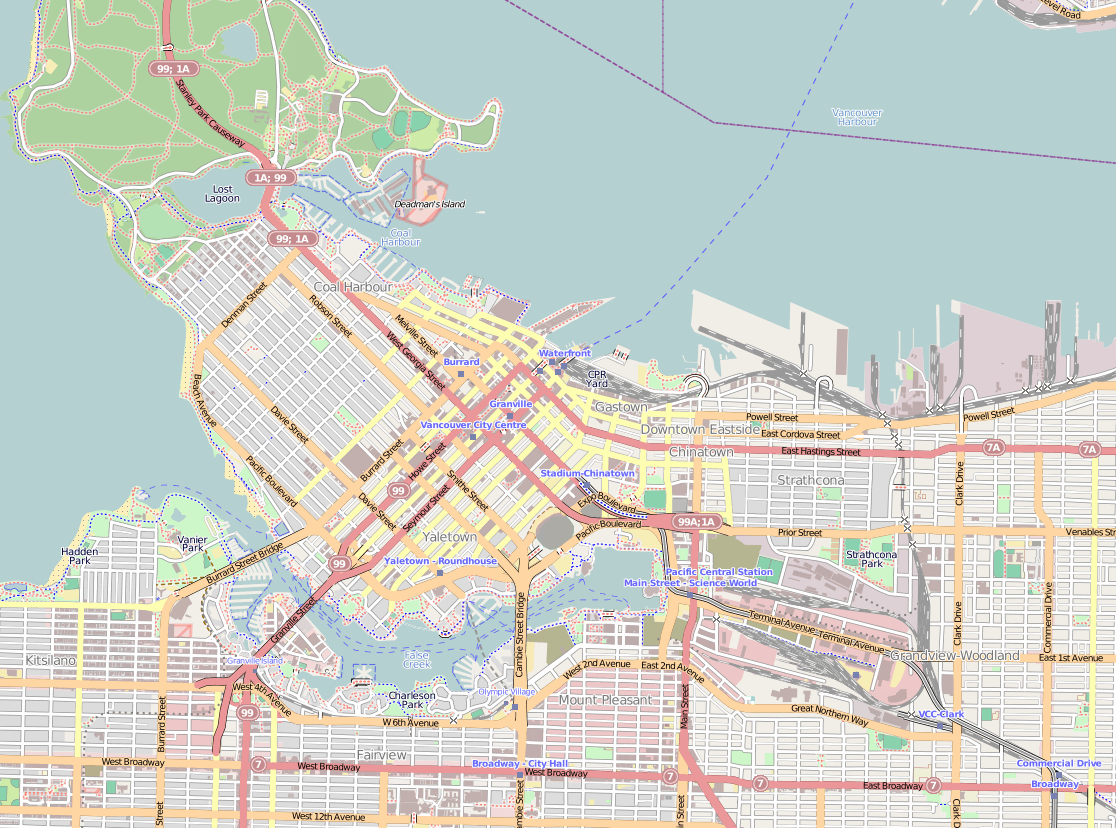
- Location within Downtown Vancouver

General information
- Location: Vancouver, British Columbia, Canada
- Coordinates: 49°16′58″N 123°7′27″W
- Owner: Northland Properties

Website
- www.suttonplace.com/vancouver

The Sutton Place Hotel Vancouver is a luxury hotel in the Canadian city of Vancouver, British Columbia. The hotel is owned by Northland Properties and managed by the Sutton Place Hotel Company (SP) (which also managed the Sutton Place Hotel in Toronto).

== Description ==
The hotel is one of Canada's two five-diamond hotels and made the 2004 Conde Nast Gold List of the best hotels in the world. It is said to attract "deep-pocketed business travellers and a galaxy of visiting film and TV stars." The decor is mainly European-inspired, particularly French. Frommer's said of it "Don't let the big pink hospital-like exterior fool you. Once you enter the lobby of this centrally located hotel, it's pure luxury."

The hotel is served by the Restaurant Boulevard Kitchen & Oyster Bar.
