= Northland Properties =

Canadian property company

Northland Properties Corporation
- Type: Private
- Founded: 1963; 63 years ago
- Headquarters: Vancouver
- Key people: Bob Gaglardi (Founder & Chairman); Tom Gaglardi (President)
- Owner: Gaglardi family
- Number of employees: 10,000+ (2018)
- Subsidiaries: Hotels: Sandman Hotel Group; Sutton Place Hotels (Vancouver); Revelstoke Mountain Resort; Dining: Denny's Canada; Moxies; Sports: Dallas Stars; Texas Stars; Kamloops Blazers; Properties: American Airlines Center; Dr Pepper Arena; H-E-B Center; Sandman Centre
- Website: northland.ca

Northland Properties Corporation is the parent company of multiple hotel chains, restaurants, sports teams, and Northland Asset Management Company. Northland was founded in 1963 and is owned by the Gaglardi family. Bob Gaglardi is the founder and chairman of the board and Tom Gaglardi is President of Northland Properties Corporation. Northland Properties is the largest privately held hospitality group in North America with properties spanning Canada, the United States, and the U.K. and Ireland. Their collective assets are valued at close to $8B.

== Hotels ==
In 1967, the first Sandman Inn opened in Smithers, British Columbia. The company rapidly expanded, opening at least one property every year. In 1976, a new tier of hotels was added to the company profile with Sandman Hotel Vancouver. In 2007, the Sandman Signature brand was added as a higher end brand. The Northland-owned chain currently has 47 properties across Canada and 4 in the United Kingdom.

In June 2011, Northland Properties placed a bid on the Sutton Place Hotel in Edmonton and subsequently purchased it, along with the Sutton Place Hotel in Halifax, and has the rental agent contract for Vancouver. Sutton Place currently has hotels in Vancouver, Toronto, and Halifax, and has the rental agent contract for their Hotel/Strata development at Revelstoke Mountain Resort in British Columbia.

== Restaurants ==
- Denny's Canada: Northland Properties subsidiary, Dencan Restaurants, owns all sixty Denny's locations in Canada through a licensing agreement with the South Carolina-based company.
- Moxies: a chain of sixty-six company-owned and franchise-owned upscale casual restaurants across Canada and the United States.
- Shark Club: a chain of eleven sports bars with locations in Canada, the United Kingdom, and the United States.
- Rockford Wok: an Asian-American casual restaurant with two locations in British Columbia.
- Chop: a steakhouse with fifteen locations in Canada, and two in Scotland operating under the name Chop Grill & Bar.
- Boulevard Kitchen & Oyster Bar: a restaurant with one location in Vancouver.
- Bar One: a series of bars located in Northland-owned Sandman Hotels.
- CRAFT Beer Market: Northland is the primary investor in CRAFT Beer Markets and their sub-brands including Central Taps.

== Sports teams ==
Northland Properties and the Gaglardi family were formally introduced as the new owners of the Dallas Stars hockey team on November 18, 2011. Tom Gaglardi first expressed interest in buying the Stars in 2009 and spent more than a year completing the deal for the team, which had gone through a bankruptcy proceeding. A bankruptcy court judge approved the bid for an enterprise value of $240 million. As of 2014, Northland Properties also owns the Texas Stars, the Dallas Stars' AHL affiliate.

Northland Properties also owns the Kamloops Blazers of the Western Hockey League.

== Hotels & Resorts ==
Northland Properties is also the sole owner of Revelstoke Mountain Resort which is undergoing expansion and is expected to be the largest mountain resort in North America when completed.

Northland Properties purchased the Grouse Mountain Resort in the District of North Vancouver in January 2020.

Northland Properties also recently acquired the Portmarnock Hotel & Golf Links in Dublin, Ireland which features Bernhard Langer designed championship links golf course and overlooks the "Velvet Strand" coast.

== Criticism ==
In July 2013, seventy-seven Philippine temporary foreign workers in Canadian Denny's restaurants filed a class action against owners Northland Properties for breach of contract. The case stemmed from agreements with workers that guaranteed them 37.5 to 40 hours of work per week, as well as reimbursement for airfare to Canada. In fact, workers were frequently not given the agreed number of hours, and none were reimbursed for their airfare. Additionally, the temp agency contracted by Northland had charged fees of $5000 to $6000 to each worker as a precondition for employment, which is prohibited by the BC Employment Standards Act. Northland settled with the workers for $1.4 million.

In December 2014, Northland Properties and Tom Gaglardi were fined a total of $140,000 after Gaglardi had personally ordered a construction crew to destroy a salmon habitat at his vacation property in Kamloops, British Columbia, where he was installing a boat ramp. A former Northland Properties employee testified that he had been ordered to destroy documents related to the destruction, and throw his hard drive in the lake. In his decision, Justice Stephen Harrison said of Gaglardi, "There was an element of wilfulness here, a desire to get the job done and seek forgiveness later." The judge also quoted an expert witness in his decision, saying the area had been turned "from a very good fish habitat to a moonscape." Tom's father and Northland Properties founder Bob Gaglardi was found not guilty of the same charges.
