= Moxies =

Canadian restaurant chain

Moxie's Restaurants LP
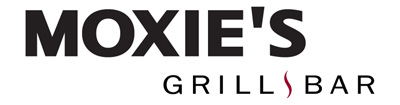
- Trade name: Moxie's (1986-1997); Moxie's Classic Grill (1997–2012); Moxie's Grill & Bar (2012–2021); Moxies (2022–present)
- Company type: Private
- Industry: Restaurant
- Genre: Premium Casual
- Founded: Calgary, Alberta, Canada (1986)
- Headquarters: Vancouver, British Columbia, Canada
- Number of locations: 59
- Key people: Joanne Forrester, president
- Revenue: $300 million+
- Owner: Northland Properties
- Number of employees: Approx. 7,000
- Website: moxies.com

Moxie's Restaurants LP (doing business as Moxies; formerly Moxie's Classic Grill, then Moxie's Grill & Bar) is a Canadian restaurant chain operating in eight provinces, as well as the U.S. states of Texas, Arizona, Massachusetts, and Florida.

== Overview ==
Moxies is a premium casual-type restaurant, whose menu focuses on house-made ingredients with a "global inspiration."

In Canada, they have locations in Alberta, British Columbia, Manitoba, New Brunswick, Newfoundland and Labrador, Nova Scotia, Ontario, and Saskatchewan. Since 2017, Moxies has expanded to the United States with locations in Dallas, Houston, Plano, Southlake, Texas, Boston and Miami, Florida. All locations are custom-designed to uniquely reflect the neighbourhood, and be eclectic and distinct.

Moxies competes with other premium casual chains, such as Earls and Cactus Club Cafe. Moxies' parent company, Northland Properties, also owns Chop Steakhouse & Bar, Shark Club Bar & Grill, Rockford Wok, Bar One Urban Lounge, and Denny's restaurant franchises in Canada.

== History ==
Former logo as Moxie's Classic Grill

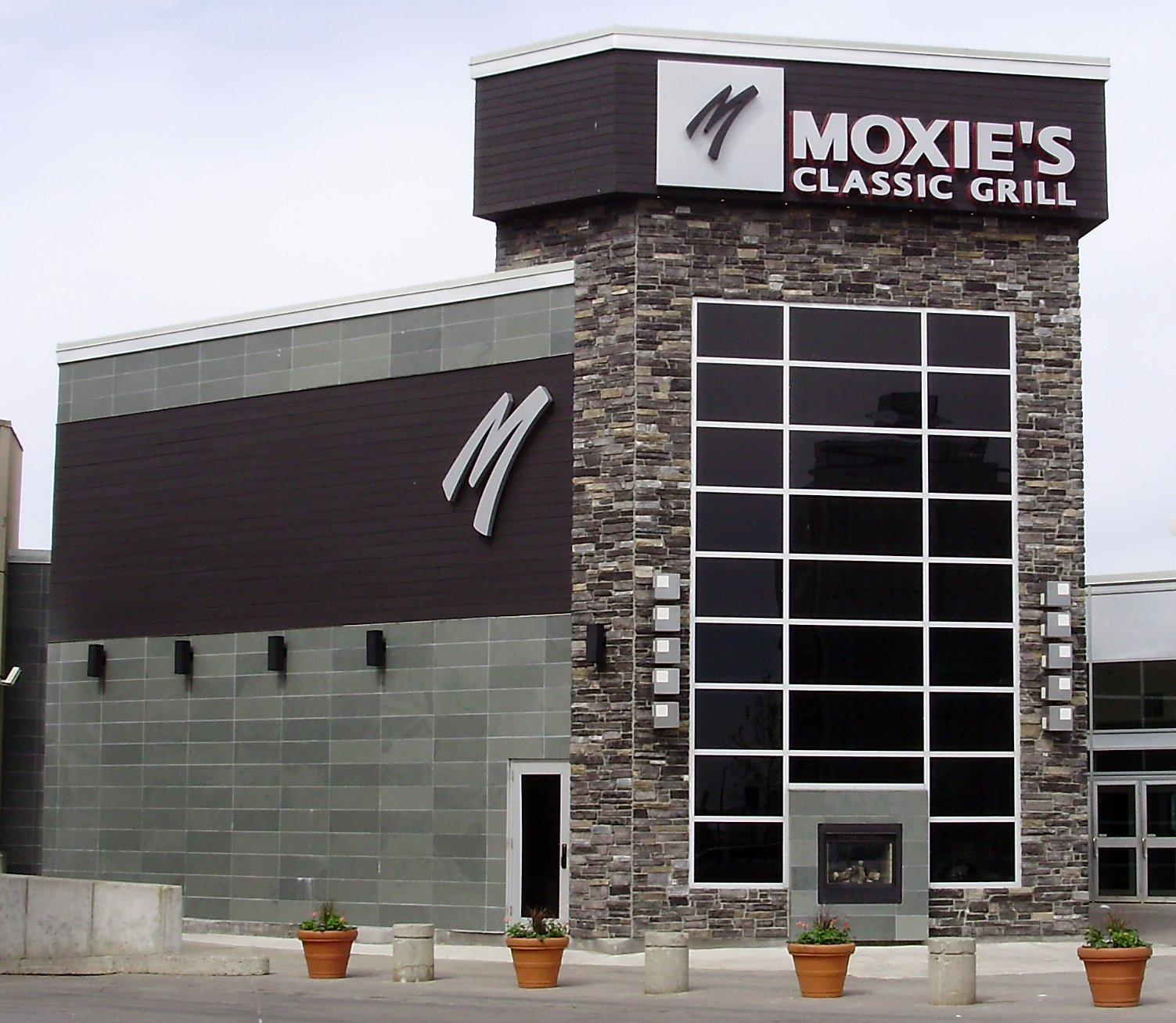
A Moxie's Classic Grill restaurant at the Scarborough Town Centre, 2008

Moxies originally started in September 1986 as a 96-seat deli in Calgary called Muncie's. Less than two months later, the name was changed to Moxie's because too many people were mistakenly calling it “Munchie's”.

The concept continued to evolve and in 2004 went from a family restaurant to premium casual, with a menu and restaurant design transformation. In 2007, they earned an unprecedented number of achievement awards across Canada, including: Best All-Around Restaurant and Best Lunch Spot, Best Menu, Best Service, Best Appetizer Menu and Best Bar.

In 2017, Moxies expanded beyond Canada and opened their first location in the United States with their Dallas, Texas, location. Their American restaurants have become some of the most popular restaurants in North America, and they have since opened Texas locations in Houston, Plano, and Southlake, as well as in Miami, Florida. The Southlake location opened in October 2020 at Southlake Town Square. Their second location in Florida opened in Fort Lauderdale in March 2023. They have also announced new locations in Scottsdale, and Boston.

== Criticism ==
In April 2014, the Canadian Broadcasting Corporation did a piece on Moxies having more health violations than any other large restaurant chain in Canada. The CBC also sent a reporter undercover with hidden cameras as a server at a Moxies location in Vancouver.

A CBC Marketplace investigation in February 2018 found that in response to Ontario's minimum wage increase, Moxies required servers in that province to "tip out" 5.75% of their sales (that is, contribute this share of their tips to a pool for cooks, busboys, and other workers who do not receive tips); it had been 4.75% prior to the change in the minimum wage.

== See also ==
- List of Canadian restaurant chains
