= Yale (disambiguation) =

Yale is a university in the United States.

Yale may also refer to:

== Businesses and organisations ==
=== Companies and products ===
- Yale (company), a lock manufacturer
- Yale (automobile), by the Kirk Manufacturing Company, 1901–1905
- Yale (1916 automobile), by the Saginaw Motor Company, 1916-1918
- Yale Motor Company, an American car manufacturer in New Haven, Connecticut, 1898–1902
- Yale motorcycle, an American motorcycle company, 1902
- RapidMiner, formerly YALE, date science software
- Yale Materials Handling Corporation, a forklift manufacturer

=== Education ===
- Yale College, Wrexham, Wales
- Yale Secondary School, Abbotsford, British Columbia, Canada
- Yale University, New Haven, Connecticut, U.S.
  - Yale College, the undergraduate college of Yale University

== People ==
- Yale (surname), including a list of people with the name
- Yale (journalist), nickname of the Spanish journalist Felipe Navarro García (1930–1994)

== Places ==
=== Canada ===
- Yale, British Columbia
  - Yale (federal electoral district), defunct
  - Yale (provincial electoral district)
  - Yale District, a defunct federal electoral district
  - Yale-North

=== United Kingdom ===
- Ial or Yale, a commote of medieval Wales

=== United States ===
- Yale, Illinois
- Yale, Iowa
- Yale, Kansas
- Yale, Michigan
  - Yale Airport
- Yale, Mississippi
- Yale, Ohio
- Yale, Oklahoma
- Yale, South Dakota
- Yale, Virginia
- Yale, Washington
- Yale Township, Valley County, Nebraska
- Yale Building, in Chicago, Illinois
- Yale Glacier, in Alaska
- Yale Lake, in Washington
  - Yale Dam
  - Yale Park
- Yale station, in Denver, Colorado
- Lake Yale, in Florida
- Mount Yale, in the Rocky Mountains

== Sports ==
- Club Atletico Yale, a basketball club from Uruguay
- Yale Atlético Clube, a former Brazilian sports club
- Yale Bulldogs, College sport teams representing Yale University

== Transportation and military ==
- North American NA-64 Yale, a World War II training aircraft
- SS Yale, the name of several steamships
- USS Yale, the name of several ships of the U.S. Navy

== Other uses ==
- Yale (typeface), commissioned by Yale University
- Yale (mythical creature), a creature in European mythology
- Yalë language, a Papuan language
- Yale Cantonese romanization, developed by Yale scholar Gerard P. Kok
- Yale, a 2020 song by American rapper Ken Carson

== See also ==
- Yale school, an influential group of thinkers
