= Charles Augustus Semlin =

Canadian politician (1836-1927)

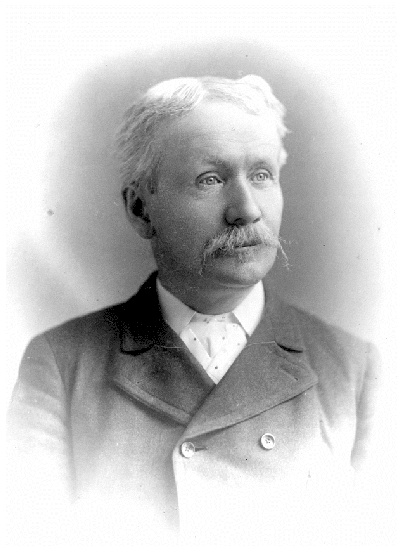

12th Premier of British Columbia
- In office August 15, 1898 – February 27, 1900
- Monarch: Victoria
- Lieutenant Governor: Thomas Robert McInnes
- Preceded by: John Herbert Turner
- Succeeded by: Joseph Martin

MLA for Yale
- In office October 16, 1871 – September 11, 1875 Serving with Robert Smith, James Robinson
- Preceded by: first member
- Succeeded by: Forbes George Vernon
- In office July 24, 1882 – July 7, 1894 Serving with Preston Bennett, John Andrew Mara, George Bohun Martin
- Preceded by: Forbes George Vernon
- Succeeded by: riding abolished

MLA for Yale-West
- In office July 7, 1894 – June 9, 1900
- Preceded by: first member
- Succeeded by: Denis Murphy

Personal details
- Born: December 4, 1836 near Barrie, Upper Canada
- Died: November 2, 1927 (aged 90) Cache Creek, British Columbia
- Children: Mary Semlin
- Occupation: teacher, miner, packer, hotel owner, rancher
- Profession: politician

Charles Augustus "Charlie" Semlin (December 4, 1836 – November 2, 1927) was a Canadian politician and rancher.

Born near Barrie, Upper Canada, Semlin worked there as a schoolteacher until 1862 when he moved to British Columbia during the gold rush to become a prospector. Failing at that, he took work under Clement Francis Cornwall at the Ashcroft Manor Ranch. With Philip Parke he established the Cache Creek Hotel. In 1869 he purchased the Dominion Ranch and became a rancher. He entered politics when British Columbia became a province of Canada, in 1871, winning the Yale riding in the provincial legislature in 1871 and was defeated in 1876, though won election again in 1882. He was Leader of the Opposition in 1884. While in politics Semlin was instrumental in the building and operating of a boarding school in Cache Creek. The site was chosen there as Cache Creek was the midpoint between the Cariboo region to the north and the populated areas of the Lower Mainland to the south. He lost his seat in 1875 but returned to the assembly in 1882. In 1894 he became leader of the opposition and finally the 12th premier of British Columbia in August 1898. His government lasted only two years and resigned to make way for the rump regime of Joseph Martin, who was defeated in the election of 1900.

He died on November 2, 1927, at his ranch, which is just east of Cache Creek, British Columbia. Semlin raised a daughter, Mary, and left much of his estate, valued at just over $50,000 and consisting mainly of stock in the Dominion Ranch to her.

== Legacy ==
His name features in the Cache Creek area in the Canadian Pacific Railway railway-point name Semlin, on the south bank of the Thompson River near Cache Creek and in the name of the Semlin Valley which stretches east from Cache Creek on the north side of the Thompson, and is the route of the Trans-Canada Highway today. It was the location of his Dominion Ranch. A street in East Vancouver, Semlin Drive, bears his name.
