= List of members of the Canadian House of Commons with military service (G) =

Military service House Members

Name	Elected party	Constituency	Elected date	Military service
Sébastien Gagnon	Bloc Québécois	Lac-Saint-Jean—Saguenay	December 9, 2002	Canadian Forces Land Force Command (1991–1995)
William Alfred Galliher	Liberal	Yale—Cariboo	November 7, 1900	Militia (1885)
Joseph Gaudet	Conservative	Nicolet	September 20, 1867	Militia
Louis-Philippe Gauthier	Conservative	Gaspé	September 21, 1911	Canadian Army (1916–1918)
Pierre Gauthier	Liberal	Portneuf	January 27, 1936	Canadian Army (1941–1942)
George Reginald Geary	Conservative	Toronto South	October 29, 1925	Canadian Army (1915–1919)
Marvin Gelber	Liberal	York South	April 8, 1963	Canadian Army
Edmund William George	Liberal	Westmorland	June 27, 1949	Canadian Army
Bud Germa	New Democrat	Sudbury	May 29, 1967	Royal Canadian Air Force (1939–1945)
Colin David Gibson	Liberal	Hamilton—Wentworth	June 25, 1968	Canadian Army (1942-)
Colin William George Gibson	Liberal	Hamilton West	March 26, 1940	British Army (1914–1919)
James Gordon Gilchrist	Progressive Conservative	Scarborough East	May 22, 1979	Canadian Army (1949–1954)
Alastair Gillespie	Liberal	Etobicoke	June 25, 1968	Royal Canadian Navy (1941–1945)
James McPhail Gillies	Progressive Conservative	Don Valley	October 30, 1972	Royal Canadian Air Force (1944–1945)
Osias Godin	Liberal	Nickel Belt	March 31, 1958	Canadian Army (1941–1943)
Peter Goldring	Reform	Edmonton East	June 2, 1997	Royal Canadian Air Force (1962–1965)
Tom Goode	Liberal	Burnaby—Richmond	June 27, 1949	Canadian Army (1940–1945)
Roy Theodore Graham	Liberal	Swift Current	March 26, 1940	Canadian Army
Herb Gray	Liberal	Essex West	June 18, 1962	Canadian Army
John H. Gray	Conservative	City and County of St. John	September 20, 1867	Military
Ross Wilfred Gray	Liberal	Lambton West	January 14, 1929	Canadian Army (1916–1919)
Howard Charles Green	Conservative	Vancouver South	October 14, 1935	Canadian Army
Robert Francis Green	Conservative	Kootenay	May 30, 1912	Military
John James Greene	Liberal	Renfrew South	April 8, 1963	Royal Canadian Air Force (1941–1945)
Milton Fowler Gregg	Liberal	York—Sunbury	October 20, 1947	Canadian Army
William Antrobus Griesbach	Unionist	Edmonton West	December 17, 1917	Militia, Canadian Army (1914-)
David Walter Groos	Liberal	Victoria	April 8, 1963	Royal Canadian Navy (1935–1961)
Ivan Grose	Liberal	Oshawa	October 25, 1993	Royal Canadian Air Force (1947–1951)
Joseph-Philippe Guay	Liberal	St. Boniface	June 25, 1968	Royal Canadian Navy
