= Burrell Creek =

Coordinates: 49°21′58″N 118°27′44″W

Burrell Creek is a creek just north of Grand Forks, British Columbia, in the Similkameen Division, Yale Land District, in an area known as the Boundary Country. It flows south into the Granby River, of which it is a tributary.

It was named after Martin Burrell, MP for Yale—Cariboo from 1908 to 1917, and for Yale from 1917 to 1920. Burrell was Minister of Agriculture and resided in the Grand Forks area.
