= Grote Stirling =

Canadian politician

The Honourable Grote Stirling PC
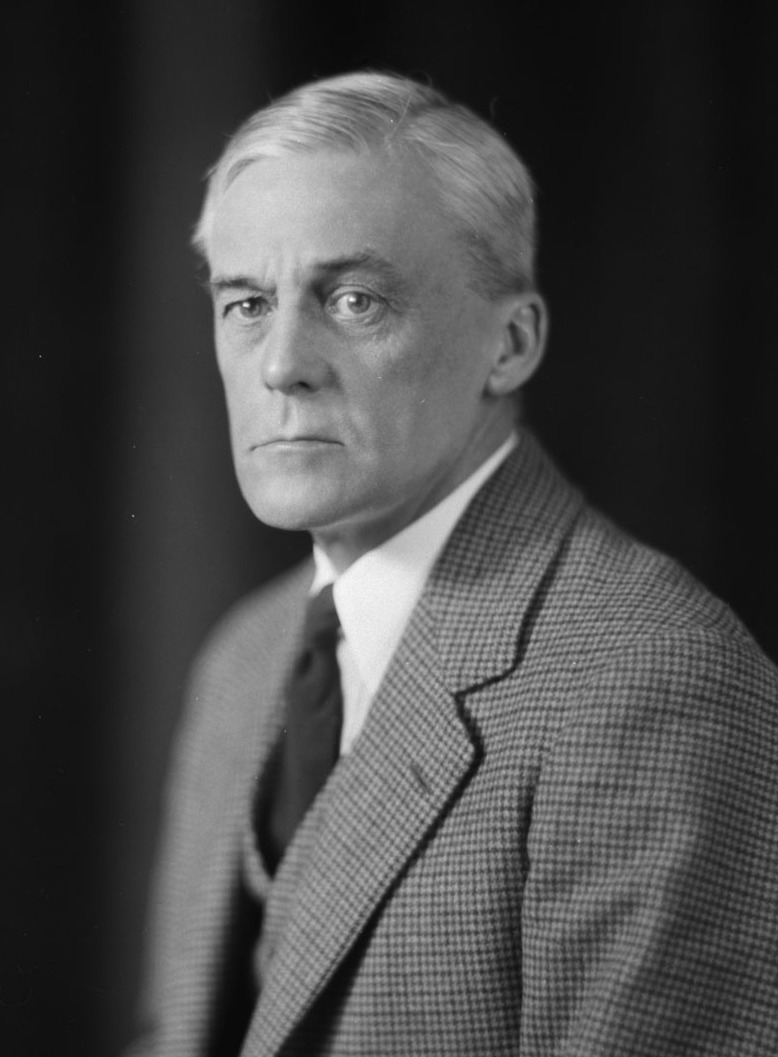
- Stirling, c. 1934

Member of Parliament for Yale
- In office 6 November 1924 – 4 October 1947
- Preceded by: Martin Burrell
- Succeeded by: Owen Jones

Personal details
- Born: 31 July 1875 Tunbridge Wells, Kent, England
- Died: 18 January 1953 (aged 77) Kelowna, British Columbia
- Party: Conservative; Progressive Conservative
- Spouse: Mabel Katherine née Brigstocke
- Cabinet: Minister of National Defence; Minister of Fisheries (Acting)

Grote Stirling PC (31 July 1875 – 18 January 1953) was a Canadian politician.

== Life ==
Born in Tunbridge Wells, United Kingdom, he was the son of Captain Charles Stirling (1831–1915), an officer in the Royal Navy of Scottish descent, and Selina Matilda Grote. Grote was a civil engineer, educated at University College London, and Crystal Palace School of Engineering.

=== In Canada ===
Stirling moved to Canada, where he continued to work as an engineer. Grote was elected to the House of Commons of Canada representing the British Columbia riding of Yale in a 1924 by-election. A Conservative, he was re-elected in 1925, 1926, 1930, 1935, and 1940. From 1934 to 1935, he was the Minister of National Defence and Minister of Fisheries (Acting).

=== Family ===
Stirling was married twice. He married first, in Beirut on 22 January 1903 Mabel Katherine Brigstocke, daughter of Dr. Richard Whish Brigstocke, who lived in Beirut. She died in 1933, and he remarried in 1936 Gladys Annie Gready, daughter of Wallace Gready. There were four children of the first marriage, including Rear-Admiral Michael Grote Stirling (1915–2002), who resigned over his opposition to the unification of the Canadian armed forces and later served as the Agent-General of British Columbia in London.
