= Price Ellison =

Canadian politician (1852–1932)

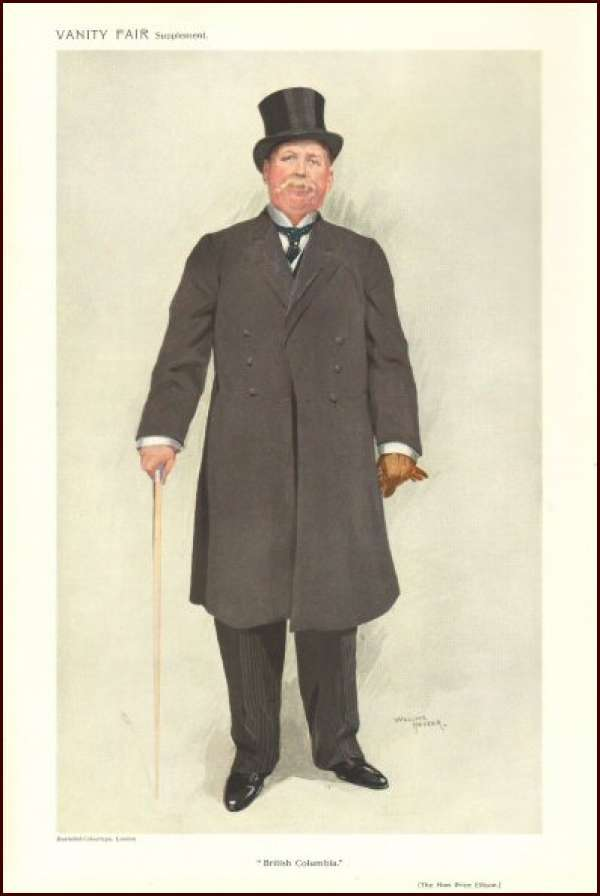
- British Columbia, Vanity Fair, 1911

Member of the Legislative Assembly of British Columbia
- In office 1903–1916
- Preceded by: Constituency established
- Succeeded by: Constituency abolished
- Constituency: Okanagan
- In office 1898–1903
- Preceded by: Donald Graham
- Succeeded by: Constituency abolished
- Constituency: Yale-East

Personal details
- Born: October 6, 1852 Dunham, Cheshire, England
- Died: December 10, 1932 (aged 80) Vernon, British Columbia, Canada
- Spouse: Sophia Christine Johnson (m. 1884)
- Occupation: Blacksmith; farmer; rancher; politician

Price Ellison (October 6, 1852 – December 10, 1932) was an English-born blacksmith, farmer, rancher and political figure in British Columbia. He represented Yale-East from 1898 to 1903 and Okanagan from 1903 to 1916 as a Conservative in the Legislative Assembly of British Columbia.

== Early life and career ==
He was born in Dunham, Cheshire, the son of James Ellison and Ellen Fearnaught, and was educated in Manchester. Ellison entered the blacksmith and hardware business. In 1873, he came to the United States, travelling from Boston to California. Ellison settled in Vernon, British Columbia in 1876. After not meeting much success at mining, he again worked as a blacksmith for a time in Vernon. Ellison then purchased a farm, where he grew wheat and raised livestock.

== Political career ==
He served in the provincial cabinet as Chief Commissioner of Lands and Works and then as Minister of Finance and Agriculture. He became known as the Honourable Price Ellison. He also served as deputy speaker of the Legislature. Ellison was defeated when he ran for re-election to the assembly in 1916 and again in 1924.

== Personal life ==
In 1884, he married Sophia Christine Johnson, the first school teacher in Vernon.

== Death and legacy ==
He died in Vernon at the age of 81.

Ellison Provincial Park was named in his honour. In 1910, as Commissioner of Lands and Works, Ellison travelled with a group of surveyors who established the boundaries for Strathcona Provincial Park, the first provincial park in British Columbia.
