= Okanagan (provincial electoral district) =

Defunct provincial electoral district in British Columbia, Canada

Okanagan was a provincial electoral district in British Columbia, Canada, beginning with the election of 1903 and lasting only until the election of 1912, after which it was succeeded by North Okanagan and South Okanagan. The riding was originally part of the Yale riding until 1890. When that riding was first broken up the Okanagan was in Yale-East (1894–1900).

== Election results ==
Note: Winners of each election are in bold.

10th British Columbia election, 1903
Party	Candidate	Votes	%	±	Expenditures
**Conservative**	**Price Ellison**	**725**	**56.77%**		unknown
Liberal	Thomas Willing Stirling	552	43.23%		unknown
Total valid votes		1,277	100.00%		
Total rejected ballots					
Turnout		%			

11th British Columbia election, 1907
Party	Candidate	Votes	%	±	Expenditures
**Conservative**	**Price Ellison**	**893**	**54.85%**		unknown
Socialist	John William Stalker Logie	92	5.65%	–	unknown
Liberal	Kenneth Cattanach MacDonald	643	39.50%		unknown
Total valid votes		1,628	100.00%		
Total rejected ballots					
Turnout		%			

12th British Columbia election, 1909
Party	Candidate	Votes	%	±	Expenditures
Liberal	Francis Richard Edwin DeHart	741	30.04%		unknown
**Conservative**	**Price Ellison**	**1,538**	**62.34%**		unknown
Socialist	James Foulds Johnson	188	7.62%	–	unknown
Total valid votes		2,467	100.00%		
Total rejected ballots					
Turnout		%			

13th British Columbia election, 1912
Party	Candidate	Votes	%	±	Expenditures
**Conservative**	**Price Ellison**	**1,388**	**82.37%**		unknown
Socialist	George Faulds Sterling	297	17.63%	–	unknown
Total valid votes		1,685	100.00%		
Total rejected ballots					
Turnout		%			

Redistribution of the riding following the 1912 election and two new ridings, North Okanagan and South Okanagan first appeared in the election of 1916.

== See also ==
- List of British Columbia provincial electoral districts
- Canadian provincial electoral districts
- List of electoral districts in the Okanagan
