= Yale-West =

Defunct provincial electoral district in British Columbia, Canada

Yale-West was a provincial electoral district in the British Columbia legislature that appeared only in the 1894, 1898, and 1900 elections. It and its sister ridings (Yale-West and Yale-East) were created from the older three-member Yale riding, which was one of the province's first twelve as of 1871. For the 1903 election the riding-name Yale was restored on an adapted version of Yale-West. The area of Yale-West is now part of the riding of Yale-Lillooet.

== Election results ==
Note: Winners of each election are in bold.

7th British Columbia election, 1894
Party	Candidate	Votes	%	±	Expenditures
Opposition	**Charles Augustus Semlin**	**198**	**61.88%**	–	unknown
Government	James Wardle	122	38.38%	–	unknown
Total valid votes		320	100.00%		
Total rejected ballots					
Turnout		%			

8th British Columbia election, 1898
Party	Candidate	Votes	%	±	Expenditures
Government	John James Mackay	88	30.24%	–	unknown
Opposition	**Charles Augustus Semlin**	**423**	**49.76%**	–	unknown
Total valid votes		291	100.00%		
Total rejected ballots					
Turnout		%			

1900 British Columbia general election
Party	Candidate	Votes	%
Government	George Washington Beebe	149	29.74%
Opposition-Progressive	**Denis Murphy**	**352**	**70.26%**
Total valid votes		501	

== See also ==
- List of British Columbia provincial electoral districts
- Canadian provincial electoral districts
- List of electoral districts in the Kootenays
- List of electoral districts in the Okanagan

Legislative Assembly of British Columbia
Preceded by Victoria City	Constituency represented by the Premier of British Columbia; 1898−1900	Succeeded by Vancouver City
