= Owen Jones (Canadian politician) =

Canadian politician

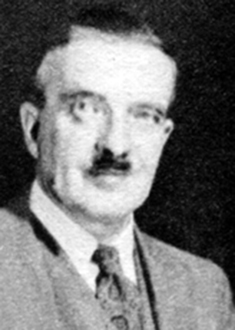

Member of Parliament for Yale
- In office May 1948 – August 1953
- Preceded by: Grote Stirling
- Succeeded by: riding abolished

Member of Parliament for Okanagan Boundary
- In office August 1953 – June 1957
- Preceded by: riding created
- Succeeded by: Frank Christian

Personal details
- Born: Owen Lewis Jones; 6 February 1889 Newborough, Anglesey, Wales
- Died: 5 November 1964 (aged 74)
- Party: Co-operative Commonwealth Federation
- Profession: merchant

Owen Lewis Jones (6 February 1890 – 5 November 1964) was a Member of Parliament of the House of Commons of Canada, representing the Co-operative Commonwealth Federation.

He was born in Newborough, Anglesey, Wales. Before being elected to Parliament, he was an owner and operator of furniture stores in the Kelowna and Penticton region of British Columbia. He was also a Kelowna City Councillor and mayor of Kelowna, British Columbia.

After two unsuccessful attempts to win the Yale riding in the 1940 and 1945 federal elections, Jones won a by-election held on 31 May 1948 which was called when incumbent member Grote Stirling resigned due to poor health.

Jones was re-elected at Yale in the 1949 federal election then following a change in electoral district boundaries, he won re-election at the Okanagan Boundary riding in 1953. Jones was defeated by Frank Christian of the Social Credit Party in the 1957 election. Jones made two further attempts to win back the Okanagan Boundary seat in 1958 and 1962 but was defeated on those occasions by David Vaughan Pugh of the Progressive Conservative Party.
