= Bill Hartley (politician) =

Canadian politician

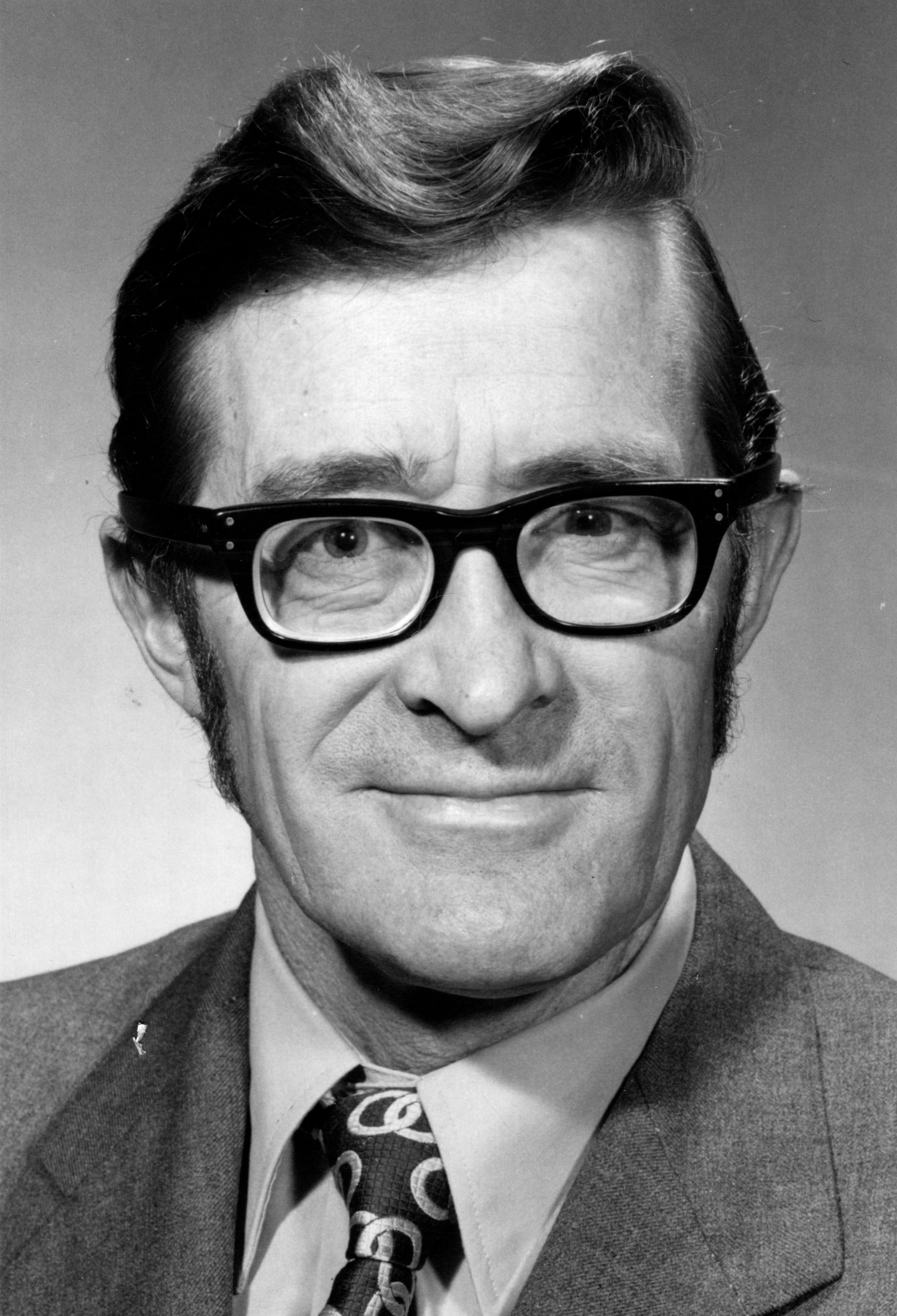

Member of the British Columbia Legislative Assembly for Yale-Lillooet Yale (1963-1966)
- In office September 30, 1963 – December 11, 1975
- Preceded by: Irvine Corbett
- Succeeded by: Thomas Waterland

Personal details
- Born: December 12, 1916 Estevan, Saskatchewan
- Died: May 4, 2003 (aged 86)
- Party: New Democrat
- Profession: Insurance agent

William Leonard Hartley (December 12, 1916 – May 4, 2003) was an electrician, insurance salesman and political figure in British Columbia. He represented Yale from 1963 to 1966 and Yale-Lillooet from 1966 to 1975 as a New Democrat.

He was born in Estevan, Saskatchewan, the son of Leonard Hartley and Sarah Ann Lee, both natives of England, and grew up in Clayburn, British Columbia. Hartley settled in Mission, B.C. He was president of the North Fraser Co-operative Association and served on the board of C.U. & C. Health Services. Hartley ran unsuccessfully a number of times as a Co-operative Commonwealth Federation candidate for a seat in federal and provincial elections, before he was elected provincially for the New Democratic Party in 1963. He was subsequently re-elected three times. He served in the provincial cabinet as Minister of Public Works, in the New Democratic Party government from 1972 to 1975 Hartley was defeated when he ran for re-election in 1975. He retired from the insurance business in 1986.

Hartley help found Co-op Fire and Casualty, later The Co-operators.

In 1955, he married Marianne Martha Mueller a nurse from Lumsden, Saskatchewan. He had three children, Gretchen, Eric and Lisa.
