= Bruce Howard =

Bruce Howard may refer to:

- Bruce Howard (politician) (1922–2002), Canadian politician
- Bruce Howard (baseball) (born 1943), Major League Baseball pitcher
