= John Joseph Alban Gillis =

Canadian politician

Member of the British Columbia Legislative Assembly for Yale
- In office 1928–1952
- Preceded by: John Duncan MacLean
- Succeeded by: Irvine Finlay Corbett

Personal details
- Born: June 17, 1882 Miscouche, Prince Edward Island
- Died: April 6, 1965 (aged 82) Vancouver, British Columbia, Canada
- Party: British Columbia Liberal Party
- Occupation: Physician, surgeon

John Joseph Alban Gillis (June 17, 1882 – April 6, 1965) was a physician, surgeon and political figure in British Columbia. He represented Yale in the Legislative Assembly of British Columbia from 1928 to 1952 as a Liberal.

He was born in Miscouche, Prince Edward Island, the son of Archibald Francis Gillis and Margaret MacDonald, and was educated at Saint Dunstan's University and McGill University. Gillis was senior house doctor at the Royal Victoria Hospital in Montreal before moving to Merritt, British Columbia. In 1917, he married Gertrude Chambers. Gillis was mayor of Merritt for two years. He served as doctor for the Nicola Valley area. Gillis died in Vancouver at the age of 82.
