= Charles Frederick Houghton =

Canadian politician

Member of the Canadian Parliament for Yale District
- In office 1871–1872
- Succeeded by: Replaced by Yale

Personal details
- Born: 27 April 1839 Glashare Castle, County Kilkenny, Ireland
- Died: 13 August 1898 (aged 59) Victoria, British Columbia, Canada
- Party: Liberal

Charles Frederick Houghton (27 April 1839 – 13 August 1898) was a Canadian rancher, justice of the peace, politician and soldier.

== Military career ==
Born in County Kilkenny, Ireland, Charles Houghton was commissioned into the 57th Foot without purchase in 1855. In 1856 he was promoted lieutenant without purchase, and in 1858 he transferred into the 5th Foot; a month later he transferred into the 20th Foot. In 1861 he purchased a Captaincy. In 1863 he retired from the Army and emigrated to British Columbia, Canada, settling in the Okanagan valley. Through a military land grant, he established Coldstream Ranch that year, later transferring title to fellow officers Forbes George Vernon and Charles Albert Vernon.

== Political career ==
In 1865 and 1866, he led expeditions to explore the Gold Range through to the Columbia River mines. In 1866, he was appointed justice of the peace. After British Columbia entered Canadian Confederation he was elected to the House of Commons of Canada for the riding of Yale District in 1871.

After being promoted to lieutenant-colonel, he was appointed deputy adjutant-general of the militia for Military District No.11 (British Columbia) in 1873.

In 1877, he commanded a force of 60 men, reinforced by infantry and artillery from New Westminster and the gunboat HMS Grappler, in a failed attempt to remove striking colliers from Robert Dunsmuir's Wellington mine. Two years later, Houghton married Dunsmuir's daughter, Marion.

After his marriage and a half-year in Europe, Houghton was transferred to Manitoba where he organised the 90th (Winnipeg) Battalion of Rifles. He was passed over in favour of Major-General Frederick Dobson Middleton for command of the troops charged with suppressing the North-West Rebellion.
