= Frank Christian (politician) =

Canadian politician

Member of Parliament for Okanagan Boundary
- In office June 1957 – February 1958
- Preceded by: Owen Lewis Jones
- Succeeded by: David Vaughan Pugh

Personal details
- Born: Frank Claus Christian; 28 April 1911 Vancouver, British Columbia, Canada
- Died: 26 July 1988 (aged 77) Vancouver, British Columbia, Canada
- Party: Social Credit
- Spouse(s): Vera Grace Bedlow m. 5 October 1936
- Profession: lawyer

Frank Claus Christian (28 April 1911 – 26 July 1988) was a Social Credit party member of the House of Commons of Canada. Born in Vancouver, British Columbia, he was a lawyer by career.

He was first elected at the Okanagan Boundary riding in the 1957 general election. As he completed his only term, the 23rd Canadian Parliament, Christian stated that he would not seek re-election in the 1958 election due to the need to spend six or seven months a year from his family while in Parliament.

Christian served for four years in municipal politics as a councillor and alderman of Penticton, British Columbia.
