= John Andrew Mara =

Canadian politician

John Andrew Mara (July 21, 1840 – February 11, 1920) was a Canadian merchant, rancher and a politician at both the provincial and federal levels.

Born in Toronto, Mara was elected to four terms in the Legislative Assembly of British Columbia. He sat in the provincial legislature as the member from Kootenay (1871 to 1875) and then from Yale (1875 to 1886). He ran as an Independent, as a Reform supporter, and as both a Government and Opposition supporter - this was before political parties were organized to contest provincial elections. He served as Speaker of the Legislature between January 1883 and June 1886. Federally, Mara was a Conservative and was twice acclaimed as a Member of Parliament in the federal riding of Yale before being defeated by Hewitt Bostock in the 1896 election in the new riding of Yale—Cariboo.

Mara's greater claim to fame (or infamy) is the alleged rape and pregnancy of Annie McLean, the sister of the "Wild McLean Boys". The McLeans were the halfbred children of the former HBC factor at Kamloops, Donald McLean, who had died in the Chilcotin War. Mara's alleged outrage of their sister led to the McLean brothers' bloody rampage across the Nicola Country and the death of provincial magistrate and gold commissioner Johnny Ussher.

Mara owned the large ranchlands between Enderby and Sicamous where the Okanagan and Shuswap countries meet. Mara Mountain east of the original ranch, and Mara Lake south of Sicamous, bear his name. Today Mara Lake Provincial Park on Mara Lake is now a popular tourist destination during the summer months. The village of Mara still exists south of Mara Lake along the Shuswap River.

Mara's wife Alice was the daughter of Frank Barnard, founder of the Barnard's Express Co. or "B.X.". Her brother, and therefore Mara's brother-in-law, was Sir Francis Stillman Barnard, 10th Lieutenant-Governor of British Columbia (1914–1919).

Preceded by Robert Smith	Member of the Legislative Assembly for Yale; 1887–1882	Succeeded by Charles Augustus Semlin
Parliament of Canada
Preceded by Francis Jones Barnard	Member of Parliament Yale; 1887–1896	Succeeded by Hewitt Bostock
