= Duncan Ross (British Columbia politician) =

Canadian politician

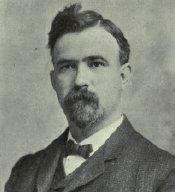

Member of the Canadian Parliament for Yale—Cariboo
- In office 1904–1908
- Preceded by: William Alfred Galliher
- Succeeded by: Martin Burrell

Personal details
- Born: May 15, 1870 Bruce County, Ontario, Canada
- Died: June 30, 1915 (aged 45)
- Party: Liberal

Duncan Ross (May 15, 1870 – June 30, 1915) was a Canadian publisher, railway contractor, and politician, born in Bruce County, Ontario. He represented the constituency of Yale–Cariboo as a Liberal from 1904 until 1908, when he lost his seat to the Conservative Martin Burrell. His attempt to return to the House of Commons in the riding of Comox—Atlin 1911 failed.

He also served as an alderman in Greenwood, British Columbia.
