= List of electoral districts in the Okanagan =

This article lists Canadian federal and provincial electoral districts with the name Okanagan, or in the Okanagan region.

== Current federal electoral districts ==
- Okanagan—Shuswap (2004– )
- Okanagan—Coquihalla (1996– )
- British Columbia Southern Interior (2004– )
- Kelowna—Lake Country (1997– )
- Central Okanagan—Similkameen—Nicola (2013–)

== Defunct federal electoral districts ==
- Kootenay—Boundary—Okanagan (1998–2003)
- North Okanagan—Shuswap (1996–1997), (2003–2004)
- Okanagan Boundary (1952–1976)
- Okanagan Centre (1987–1996)
- Okanagan North (1976–1987)
- Okanagan—Kootenay (1966–1976)
- Okanagan—Revelstoke (1952–1966)
- Okanagan—Shuswap (1987–1996), (1997–2003)
- Okanagan—Similkameen (1976–1987)
- Okanagan—Similkameen—Merritt (1987–1996)
- West Kootenay—Okanagan (1996–1998)
- Southern Interior (2003–2004)

== Current provincial electoral districts ==
- Okanagan-Vernon
- Penticton-Okanagan Valley
- Kelowna-Mission
- Kelowna-Lake Country
- Westside-Kelowna

== Defunct provincial electoral districts ==
- Yale (1871–1890)
  - Yale-East (1894–1900)
    - Similkameen (1903–1963)
      - Boundary-Similkameen (1966–1988)
        - Okanagan-Boundary (1991–1996)
          - West Kootenay-Boundary (current riding, 2001– )
  - Yale-North (1894–1900)
    - Shuswap
    - Kamloops
    - Okanagan
      - North Okanagan
        - Okanagan North
          - Okanagan-Vernon
      - South Okanagan
        - Okanagan South
          - Okanagan-Penticton
          - Okanagan-Westside
