= David Chutter =

Canadian politician

Member of the British Columbia Legislative Assembly for Yale-Lillooet
- In office May 16, 2001 – May 17, 2005
- Preceded by: Harry Lali
- Succeeded by: Harry Lali

Personal details
- Party: BC Liberal

David Chutter is a former Canadian politician, who served as a BC Liberal Member of the Legislative Assembly of British Columbia from 2001 to 2005, representing the riding of Yale-Lillooet.
