= John Armstrong MacKelvie =

Canadian politician (1865 – 1924)

John Armstrong MacKelvie (September 14, 1865 – June 4, 1924) was a journalist, editor and political figure in British Columbia, Canada. He represented Yale in the House of Commons of Canada from 1920 to 1924 as a Conservative.

He was born in Saint John, New Brunswick, the son of Thomas M. MacKelvie and Sarah Jane Armstrong. MacKelvie moved to Calgary in 1883, to Vancouver in 1888 and to Vernon in 1889. In 1882, he married Jessie Stewart McIntyre. MacKelvie served with the Alberta Mounted Rifles during the North-West Rebellion. He was editor of the Vernon News. From 1912 to 1913, he served as a member of a Royal Commission on Labour for the British Columbia government. MacKelvie was first elected to the House of Commons in a 1920 by-election held after Martin Burrell, who had been injured in a fire in the Parliament Buildings, was named librarian for the Library of Parliament. MacKelvie died in office in Ottawa at the age of 58.
