= Yale-Lillooet =

Defunct provincial electoral district in British Columbia, Canada

Yale-Lillooet was a provincial electoral district for the Legislative Assembly of British Columbia, Canada.

It first appeared in the 1966 General Election, when it superseded the older Lillooet riding, which was one of the province's original twelve ridings, as well as the equally old Yale riding, parts of which were also in Yale-Lillooet. Yale-Lillooet was last contested in the 2005 General Election; in 2009 it was largely replaced by Fraser-Nicola, with the Fraser Canyon portions in the southwest transferred to Chilliwack-Hope and the town of Keremeos in the extreme southeast transferred to Boundary-Similkameen.

== Demographics ==
Population, 2001	37,197
Population Change, 1996–2001	-2.9%
Area (km^{2})	31,889.62
Pop. Density (people per km^{2})	1.2

== Geography ==
The riding was largely rural and wilderness in character despite its proximity to the Lower Mainland, it spanned the Bridge River-Lillooet, Ashcroft-Thompson Canyon, Fraser Canyon, Nicola, and Similkameen Districts.

Since creation its shape remained relatively unchanged despite some minor boundary adjustments, with (e.g.) Ashcroft-Cache Creek joining Cariboo South in some elections and the Similkameen area joined to one of the Okanagan ridings. Its core towns — Lillooet, Lytton, Yale, Boston Bar, Hope, Princeton, Merritt, and Spences Bridge remained permanently in the riding until its demise.

Its boundary was roughly described by a quadrangle formed by and including the towns of:

- Gold Bridge-Bralorne
- Hope
- Keremeos
- Cache Creek-Ashcroft

Other towns within the riding are:

- Hedley
- Princeton
- Tulameen
- Coalmont
- Aspen Grove
- Logan Lake
- Lac le Jeune
- Lower Nicola
- Spences Bridge
- Lytton
- Boston Bar-North Bend
- Spuzzum
- Hope
- Lillooet
- Shalalth-Seton Portage
- Fountain
- Pavilion
- Hat Creek

The riding's largest and therefore electorally dominant population centre was Merritt. The riding was heavily mountainous and all its towns were all fairly isolated from each other by terrain and the necessarily difficult roads of the canyons and mountain valleys interconnecting them. Many of the electorate are scattered through smaller communities throughout the region, particularly on Indian reserves and in recreational property areas of the Bridge River Country, the Nicola-Similkameen and the Fraser Canyon.

Yale-Lillooet had the highest proportion of aboriginal voters in southern British Columbia and one of the highest proportions in the province. All reserves and local bands of the Nlaka'pamux and Nicola peoples were included within the riding, as well as those of the Upper St'at'imc and the upriver Sto:lo around Hope and Yale.

== History ==
Hope, Yale, Boston Bar, Lillooet, Lytton, and Princeton are some of the oldest towns in the province, dating to the founding of the Crown Colony during the Fraser Canyon Gold Rush. Merritt is of slightly later date and was an isolated ranching town until the opening of the Coquihalla Highway in the mid-1980s, which caused its population to boom.

The riding has traditionally been a swing riding with both strong conservative and liberal elements in its politics, and is also considered a bellwether riding although not always winding up in Government benches. The major industries are forestry and transportation-oriented services and tourism and recreation.

== Members of the Legislative Assembly ==
Over the district's existence, it elected the following members of the Legislative Assembly of British Columbia:

Parliament	Years	Member	Party
28th	1966–1969	Bill Hartley	New Democrat
29th	1969–1972	Bill Hartley	New Democrat
30th	1972–1975	Bill Hartley	New Democrat
31st	1975–1979	Thomas Waterland	Social Credit
32nd	1979–1983	Thomas Waterland	Social Credit
33rd	1986–1991	Thomas Waterland	Social Credit
34th	1986–1991	James Rabbitt	Social Credit
35th	1991–1996	Harry Lali	NDP
36th	1996–2001	Harry Lali	NDP
37th	2001–2005	David Chutter	Liberal
38th	2005–2009	Harry Lali	NDP

== Election results ==
2005 British Columbia general election
Party	Candidate	Votes	%
New Democratic	Harry S. Lali	8,489	48.84
Liberal	Lloyd George Forman	7,009	40.33
Green	Mike McLean	1,583	9.11
Democratic Reform	Arne Jensen Zabell	185	1.06
People's Front	Dorothy-Jean O'Donnell	115	0.66
Total		17,381	100.00

B.C. General Election 2001: Yale-Lillooet
Party	Candidate	Votes	%	±	Expenditures
Liberal	David Chutter	9,845	60.07%		$35,513
NDP	Victor York	2,817	17.19%		$26,185
Green	Harue Kanemitsu	1,657	10.11%	–	$2,116
All Nations	Don Moses	1,126	6.87%	–	$6,419
Marijuana	Vincent Royer	807	4.92%		$494
People's Front	Dorothy-Jean O'Donnell	136	0.84%		$252
Total valid votes		16,388	100.00%		
Total rejected ballots		84	0.51%		
Turnout		16,472	68.99%		

1996 British Columbia general election
Party	Candidate	Votes	%	±%	Expenditures
New Democratic	Harry Lali	7,080	41.06	-11.25	$41,454
Liberal	James Rabbitt	5,912	34.29	-13.40	$50,073
Reform	John Calvin Stinson	3,419	19.83	–	$23,749
Progressive Democrat	Richard Bennett	706	4.09	–	–
Family Coalition	Ed Vanwoudenberg	124	0.72	–	$426
Total valid votes		17,241	100.00		
Total rejected ballots		76	0.44		
Turnout		17,317	72.21		
New Democratic hold		Swing		-12.33	

- Liberal totals reflect James Rabbitt's personal swing when he was a Social Credit Member.

1991 British Columbia general election
Party	Candidate	Votes	%	±%	Expenditures
New Democratic	Harry Lali	7,740	52.31	+7.60	$36,378
Social Credit	James Rabbitt	7,057	47.69	-0.45	$38,170
Total valid votes		14,797	100.00		
Total rejected ballots		697	4.50		
Turnout		15,494	72.17		
New Democratic gain from Social Credit		Swing		+4.03	

1986 British Columbia general election
Party	Candidate	Votes	%	±%
Social Credit	James Rabbitt	7,424	48.14	-8.64
New Democratic	Howard C. McDiarmid	6,895	44.71	+4.04
Liberal	Richard A.Y. Lee	617	4.00	+1.45
Progressive Conservative	Glenn Henderson	485	3.15	–
Total valid votes		15,421	100.00	
Total rejected ballots		277	1.79	
Turnout		15,698		
Social Credit hold		Swing		-6.34

== See also ==
- List of British Columbia provincial electoral districts
- Canadian provincial electoral districts
- List of electoral districts in the Kootenays
- List of electoral districts in the Okanagan
