= Thomas Waterland =

Canadian politician

Member of the British Columbia Legislative Assembly for Yale-Lillooet
- In office December 11, 1975 – October 22, 1986
- Preceded by: Bill Hartley
- Succeeded by: James Rabbitt

Personal details
- Born: December 15, 1933 (age 92) Anyox, British Columbia
- Party: Social Credit
- Spouse: Donelda Catherine Stewart
- Profession: Mining Engineer

Thomas Manville Waterland (born December 15, 1933) was a mining engineer and political figure in British Columbia. He represented Yale-Lillooet in the Legislative Assembly of British Columbia from 1975 to 1986 as a Social Credit member.

He was born in Anyox, British Columbia, the son of Tilmer Manville Waterland and Jessica Kelley. In 1956, he married Donelda Catherine Stewart. Waterland lived in Saanichton. He served in the provincial cabinet as Minister of Mines and Petroleum Resource, as Minister of Forests and as Minister of Agriculture and Food. Waterland resigned as Minister of Forests in 1986 after it was disclosed that he had invested in a tax shelter associated with a pulp mill company. He served as president of the Mining Association of B.C. from 1986 to 1993.
