= Harry Lali =

Canadian politician

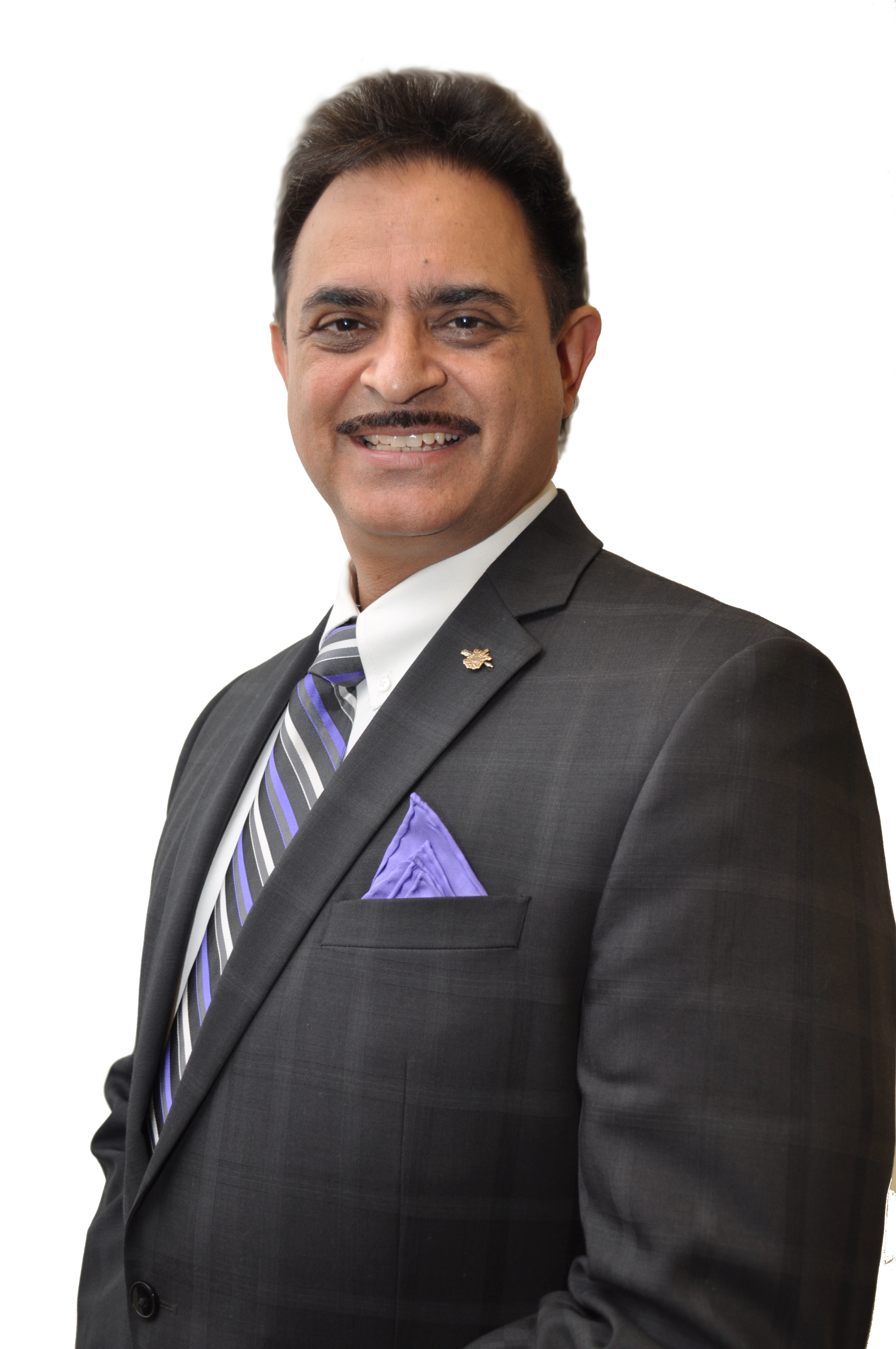

Member of the British Columbia Legislative Assembly for Fraser-Nicola
- In office May 12, 2009 – May 14, 2013
- Preceded by: Riding established
- Succeeded by: Jackie Tegart

Member of the British Columbia Legislative Assembly for Yale-Lillooet
- In office May 17, 2005 – May 12, 2009
- Preceded by: David Chutter
- Succeeded by: Riding dissolved
- In office October 17, 1991 – May 16, 2001
- Preceded by: James Rabbitt
- Succeeded by: David Chutter

Minister of Transportation and Highways of British Columbia
- In office February 18, 1998 – February 15, 2001
- Premier: Glen Clark; Dan Miller; Ujjal Dosanjh
- Preceded by: Lois Boone
- Succeeded by: Helmut Giesbrecht

Merritt City Councillor
- In office December 1988 – October 17, 1991

Personal details
- Born: Harbhajan Singh Lali; August 10, 1955 (age 70) Jullundur, Punjab, India
- Party: BC United (current) BC NDP (former)

Harbhajan Singh "Harry" Lali (born August 10, 1955) is a former MLA in the Canadian province of British Columbia.

== Biography ==
Lali spent eleven summers working in the forestry industry, and obtained a Bachelor of Arts Degree in History and South Asia Area Studies from the University of Victoria and the University of British Columbia, where he helped establish the Chair of Punjabi and Sikh Studies. He served one term as City Councillor in Merritt starting in 1988, and was an employment counsellor for the Merritt Outreach Program from 1986 until 1991.

He is a member of BC United and former member of the British Columbia New Democratic Party and the longest serving South Asian Member of a Legislative Assembly in Canadian history, surpassing his former colleague Moe Sihota in June 2010.

== Provincial politics ==
In the 1991 election he was elected to the Legislative Assembly as MLA for Yale-Lillooet by defeating one-term Social Credit incumbent James Rabbitt, and was re-elected in 1996. Lali served as the Minister of Transportation and Highways from 1998 to 2001 under three different Premiers. For the 2001 election, he chose not to run for re-election.

He returned to the Assembly by winning his riding in the 2005 election ahead of BC Liberal Party candidate Lloyd Forman and Green Party candidate Michael McLean. Lali ran again elected in the newly created riding of Fraser-Nicola in the 2009 election and was re-elected over BC Liberal Party candidate Ella Brown.

Following the party's loss in the 2009 election, Lali was one of the "baker's dozen" of MLAs who opposed NDP leader Carole James' continued leadership. The caucus revolt was successful, and James resigned as leader on December 6, 2010. On January 7, 2011, Lali announced he would be a candidate in the subsequent leadership election. Less than a month later, Lali dropped out of the race, saying that he was unable to come up with the funds necessary to mount a credible campaign.

In the 2013 election, Lali ran for re-election in his riding of Fraser-Nicola, but suffered a surprising defeat to BC Liberal candidate Jackie Tegart. Lali blamed his defeat on both a poorly-run provincial campaign, and on local NDP voters staying home because he was considered a shoo-in.

On May 17, 2016, Lali announced he would run for the NDP nomination for Fraser-Nicola in a bid to reclaim his seat. He was challenged by Aaron Sam, a Lower Nicola Indian Band chief. NDP leader John Horgan preferred Sam and tried to persuade Lali to drop out in his favour, but Lali declined. Lali won the nomination but lost his re-match with Tegart.

On May 11, 2023, Lali announced he was joining BC United (formerly the BC Liberals), saying that the NDP had become focused on urban interests to the exclusion of rural issues.

== Electoral record ==
2017 British Columbia general election: Fraser-Nicola
| Party | Candidate | Votes | % | ±% | Expenditures |
|---|---|---|---|---|---|
| Liberal | Jackie Tegart | 6,597 | 41.79 | −2.35 | $47,914 |
| New Democratic | Harry Lali | 6,073 | 38.47 | −1.15 | $51,363 |
| Green | Arthur Alexander Green | 2,519 | 15.96 | +6.30 | $17,214 |
| Social Credit | Michael Henshall | 596 | 3.78 | – | $5,848 |
| Total valid votes | | 15,785 | 100.00 | | |
| Total rejected ballots | | 69 | 0.44 | | |
| Turnout | | 15,854 | 64.04 | | |
Source: Elections BC

2013 British Columbia general election: Fraser-Nicola
| Party | Candidate | Votes | % | ±% | Expenditures |
|---|---|---|---|---|---|
| Liberal | Jackie Tegart | 6,002 | 44.14 | +1.42 | $87,325 |
| New Democratic | Harry Lali | 5,388 | 39.62 | −9.5 | $79,802 |
| Green | John Kidder | 1,314 | 9.66 | +3.13 | $2,035 |
| Conservative | Michael Beauclair | 895 | 6.58 | – | $2,628 |
| Total valid votes | | 13,599 | 100.00 | | |
| Total rejected ballots | | 51 | 0.37 | | |
| Turnout | | 13,650 | 61.52 | | |
Source: Elections BC

British Columbia provincial government of Ujjal Dosanjh
Cabinet post (1)
| Predecessor | Office | Successor |
|---|---|---|
| cont'd from Miller Ministry | Minister of Transportation and Highways; February 29, 2000 – February 15, 2001 | Helmut Giesbrecht |
British Columbia provincial government of Dan Miller
Cabinet post (1)
| Predecessor | Office | Successor |
| cont'd from Clark Ministry | Minister of Transportation and Highways; August 25, 1999 – February 24, 2000 | cont'd into Dosanjh Ministry |
British Columbia provincial government of Glen Clark
Cabinet post (1)
| Predecessor | Office | Successor |
| Lois Boone | Minister of Transportation and Highways; February 18, 1996 – August 25, 1999 | cont'd into Miller Ministry |
