= James Rabbitt =

British Columbian politician

Member of the British Columbia Legislative Assembly for Yale-Lillooet
- In office October 22, 1986 – October 17, 1991
- Preceded by: Thomas Waterland
- Succeeded by: Harry Lali

Personal details
- Born: May 22, 1941 (age 85) Princeton, British Columbia
- Party: Liberal Party (1996-?); Social Credit (1986-1996)
- Profession: Businessman

James Thomas "Jim" Rabbitt (born May 22, 1941 in Princeton, British Columbia) is a Canadian businessman and former politician. He represented Yale-Lillooet in the Legislative Assembly of British Columbia from 1986 to 1991 as a Social Credit member.

He is the son of Patrick J. Rabbitt, and was educated at the University of British Columbia. In 1961, Rabbitt married Eileen A. Goldie. He was an alderman for Merritt and was mayor from 1980 to 1984. Rabbitt served in the provincial cabinet as Minister of Labour and Consumer Services. He was defeated when he ran for reelection in 1991 as a Social Credit member and again in 1996 as a Liberal, losing to Harry Lali each time.

In 1988, he chaired a special legislative committee charged with reviewing the distribution of electoral districts in British Columbia. In 1989, he published Taking action: a strategy for the management of solid wastes as chair of the Municipal Solid Waste Management Task Force.

== Electoral history ==
1996 British Columbia general election: Yale-Lillooet
Party	Candidate	Votes	%	±%	Expenditures
New Democratic	Harry Lali	7,080	41.06	-11.25	$41,454
Liberal	James Rabbitt	5,912	34.29	-13.40	$50,073
Reform	John Calvin Stinson	3,419	19.83	–	$23,749
Progressive Democrat	Richard Bennett	706	4.09	–	–
Family Coalition	Ed Vanwoudenberg	124	0.72	–	$426
Total valid votes		17,241	100.00		
Total rejected ballots		76	0.44		
Turnout		17,317	72.21		
New Democratic hold		Swing		-12.33	

1991 British Columbia general election: Yale-Lillooet
Party	Candidate	Votes	%	±%	Expenditures
New Democratic	Harry Lali	7,740	52.31	+7.60	$36,378
Social Credit	James Rabbitt	7,057	47.69	-0.45	$38,170
Total valid votes		14,797	100.00		
Total rejected ballots		697	4.50		
Turnout		15,494	72.17		
New Democratic gain from Social Credit		Swing		+4.03	

1986 British Columbia general election: Yale-Lillooet
Party	Candidate	Votes	%	±%
Social Credit	James Rabbitt	7,424	48.14	-8.64
New Democratic	Howard C. McDiarmid	6,895	44.71	+4.04
Liberal	Richard A.Y. Lee	617	4.00	+1.45
Progressive Conservative	Glenn Henderson	485	3.15	–
Total valid votes		15,421	100.00	
Total rejected ballots		277	1.79	
Turnout		15,698		
Social Credit hold		Swing		-6.34
