= Michael Grote Stirling =

- Born: June 29, 1915; Kelowna, British Columbia
- Died: July 24, 2002 (aged 87); Victoria, British Columbia
- Military career
- Allegiance: Canada
- Branch: Royal Canadian Navy; Canadian Forces Maritime Command
- Rank: Rear-Admiral
- Commands: Maritime Forces Pacific
- Conflicts: Second World War

Rear-Admiral Michael Grote Stirling (June 29, 1915 – July 24, 2002) was a Royal Canadian Navy officer who served as Commander of Maritime Forces Pacific from 1964 to 1966. He previously served as Chief of Naval Personnel from 1962 to 1964.

== Career ==
Born in Kelowna, British Columbia to a naval family, Stirling was educated at Shawnigan Lake School before entering the Royal Naval College of Canada as a cadet in 1933. His father, Grote Stirling, was the Minister of National Defence from 1934 to 1935. He specialized in Signals at H.M. Signal School, Portsmouth in 1941.

He was appointed to the Canadian Joint Staff in Washington, D.C. in 1947. Stirling served as Director of Naval Communications from 1949 to 1951.

He was appointed Chief of Naval Personnel and served as a Member of the Naval Board from 1962 to 1964.

In 1964, Stirling served as Commander of Maritime Forces Pacific until 1966. He retired from the navy in 1967.
