= George Bohun Martin =

Canadian politician

George Bohun Martin (December 25, 1842 – August 29, 1933) was an English-born farmer, rancher and political figure in British Columbia, Canada. He represented Yale from 1882 to 1894 and Yale-North from 1894 to 1898 in the Legislative Assembly of British Columbia.

He was born in Yorkshire, the son of Captain George Bohun Martin and Isabella Harriet Briggs, and was educated at Cheltenham. Martin began a career in the Royal Navy, serving in the Baltic and in India, but was forced to retire due to illness. He came to British Columbia in 1862, working as a clerk with the Hudson's Bay Company until 1865, when he purchased a ranch on the South Thompson River. Martin was first elected to the assembly in an 1882 by-election held following the death of Preston Bennett. In 1893 and 1894, he served as deputy speaker of the Legislature. Between 1894 and 1898, he served in the Executive Council as Commissioner of Lands and Works. Martin was defeated by Francis John Deane when he ran for reelection to a sixth term in the 1898 provincial election. He died in Victoria at the age of 90.
