= Jackie Tegart =

Canadian politician

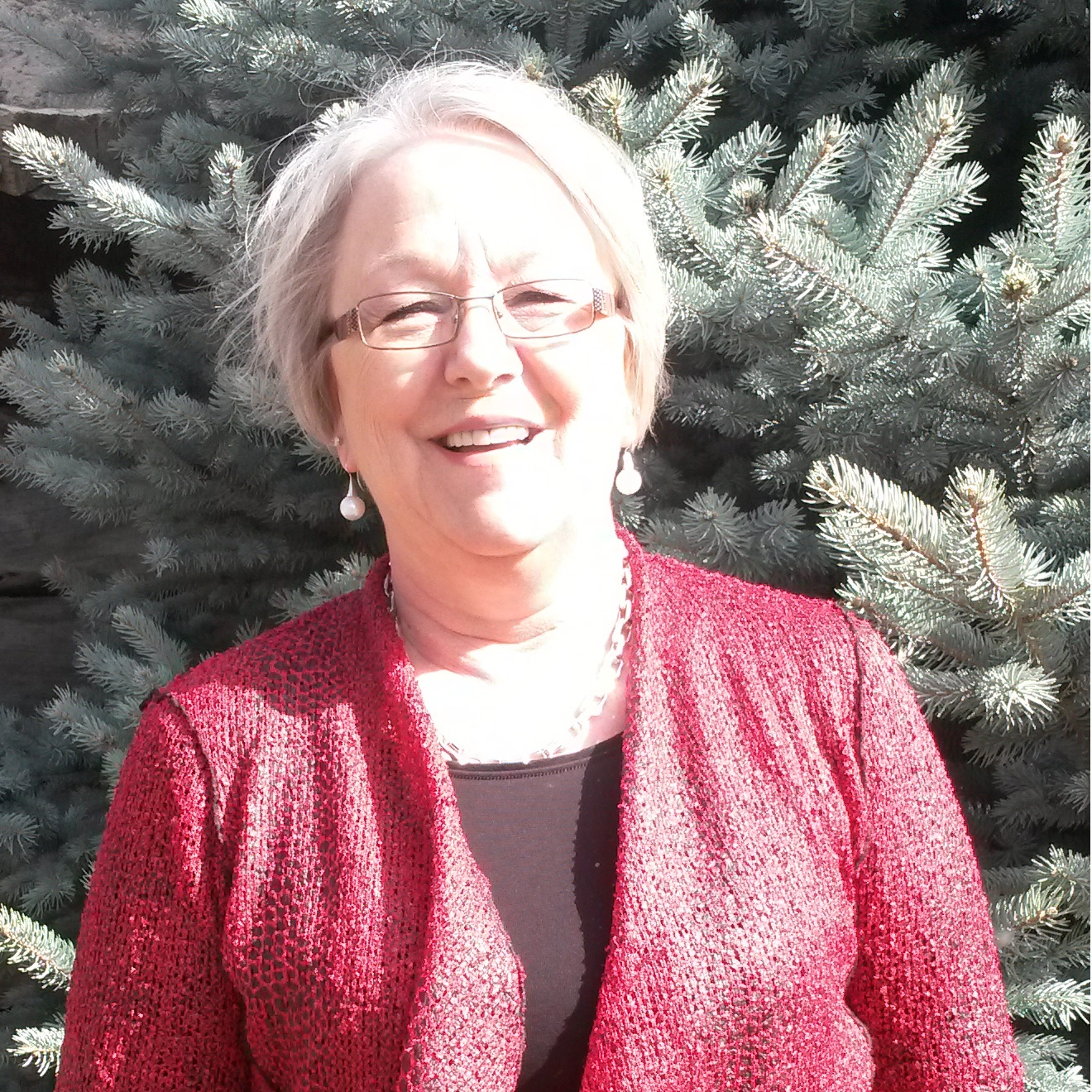

Member of the British Columbia Legislative Assembly for Fraser-Nicola
- In office May 14, 2013 – September 21, 2024
- Preceded by: Harry Lali
- Succeeded by: Tony Luck

Personal details
- Born: 1955 or 1956 (age 70–71)
- Party: BC United

Jackie L. Tegart (born 1956) is a Canadian politician, who was first elected to the Legislative Assembly of British Columbia in the 2013 provincial election and remained in office until 2024. She represented the electoral district of Fraser-Nicola as a member of the BC United. In Opposition, she served as Chair of the Liberal Party Caucus, Official Opposition Critic for Education, and Assistant Deputy Speaker.

Prior to her election, Tegart served three terms on the municipal council of Ashcroft, and was on school board for 17 years.

== Election history ==
2020 British Columbia general election: Fraser-Nicola
Party	Candidate	Votes	%	±%	Expenditures
Liberal	Jackie Tegart	5,696	41.64	−0.15	$40,524.05
New Democratic	Aaron Sumexheltza	5,414	39.58	+1.11	$30,637.56
Green	Jonah Timms	1,788	13.07	−2.89	$4,241.98
Independent	Dennis Adamson	438	3.20	–	$1,600.00
Independent	Mike Bhangu	343	2.51	–	$3,654.15
Total valid votes		13,679	99.35	–	
Total rejected ballots		89	0.65	+0.44	
Turnout		13,768	51.16	-12.88	
Registered voters		26,913			
Liberal hold		Swing		–0.63	
Source: Elections BC

2017 British Columbia general election: Fraser-Nicola
Party	Candidate	Votes	%	±%	Expenditures
Liberal	Jackie Tegart	6,597	41.79	−2.35	$47,914
New Democratic	Harry Lali	6,073	38.47	−1.15	$51,363
Green	Arthur Alexander Green	2,519	15.96	+6.30	$17,214
Social Credit	Michael Henshall	596	3.78	–	$5,848
Total valid votes		15,785	100.00		
Total rejected ballots		69	0.44		
Turnout		15,854	64.04		
Source: Elections BC

2013 British Columbia general election: Fraser-Nicola
Party	Candidate	Votes	%	±%	Expenditures
Liberal	Jackie Tegart	6,002	44.14	+1.42	$87,325
New Democratic	Harry Lali	5,388	39.62	−9.5	$79,802
Green	John Kidder	1,314	9.66	+3.13	$2,035
Conservative	Michael Beauclair	895	6.58	–	$2,628
Total valid votes		13,599	100.00		
Total rejected ballots		51	0.37		
Turnout		13,650	61.52		
Source: Elections BC
