= Yale-North =

Provincial electoral district in British Columbia, Canada (1894–1900)

Yale-North was a provincial electoral district in the British Columbia legislature that appeared only in the 1894, 1898, and 1900 elections. It and its sister ridings, Yale-West and Yale-East, were created from the older three-member Yale provincial electoral district, which was one of the province's first twelve ridings in 1871. For the 1903 election the riding name Yale was restored to an adapted version of Yale-West. Yale-North roughly corresponds today to the Kamloops–Salmon Arm region.

== Election results ==
Note: Winners of each election are in bold.

7th British Columbia election, 1894
Party	Candidate	Votes	%	±	Expenditures
Opposition	Hugh McCutcheon	227	42.12%	–	unknown
Government	**George Bohun Martin**	**312**	**57.88%**	–	unknown
Total valid votes		539	100.00%		
Total rejected ballots					
Turnout		%			

8th British Columbia election, 1898
Party	Candidate	Votes	%	±	Expenditures
Opposition	**Francis John Deane**	**427**	**50.24%**	–	unknown
Government	George Bohun Martin	423	49.76%	–	unknown
Total valid votes		850	100.00%		
Total rejected ballots					
Turnout		%			

1900 British Columbia general election
Party	Candidate	Votes	%
Independent Opposition	Frederick John Fulton	504	51.64
Progressive	Francis John Deane	388	39.75
Government	Algernon Judson Palmer	84	8.61
Total valid votes		976	100.00

== See also ==
- List of British Columbia provincial electoral districts
- Canadian provincial electoral districts
- List of electoral districts in the Okanagan
- List of electoral districts in the Kootenays
