= Arthur Samuel Goodeve =

Canadian politician and pharmacist (1860–1920)

Arthur Samuel Goodeve (December 15, 1860 – November 22, 1920) was a Canadian pharmacist and conservative politician. After a turn as mayor of Rossland, British Columbia, from 1889 to 1890, he was appointed BC's Provincial Secretary in 1903. He represented Kootenay in the House of Commons of Canada from 1908 to 1912, when he resigned upon being appointed as Railway Commissioner for Canada.

He died at the Toronto General Hospital on November 22, 1920.

Parliament of Canada
Preceded by William Alfred Galliher	Member of Parliament from Kootenay; 1908-1912	Succeeded by Robert Francis Green
