= Tony Luck =

Canadian politician

Tony Luck MLA

Member of the British Columbia Legislative Assembly for Fraser-Nicola
- Incumbent
- Assumed office October 19, 2024
- Preceded by: Jackie Tegart

Personal details
- Party: BC Conservatives
- Other political affiliations: Emerged Democracy (2005)

Tony Luck MLA is a Canadian politician who has served as a member of the Legislative Assembly of British Columbia (MLA) representing the electoral district of Fraser-Nicola since 2024. He is a member of the Conservative Party. Prior to provincial politics, Luck served as a councillor in both Mission and Merritt, British Columbia.

== Early life and career ==
Luck currently resides in Merritt with his wife Wanda. He is a father to nine children and grandfather to 25 children. Luck was born in Vancouver, British Columbia, raised in Richmond, and raised his family in Abbotsford. When he became an empty-nester in Mission, he moved to Merritt eight years ago to retire there. He has received two degrees from the University of the Fraser Valley (UFV), a Bachelor of Business Administration in 1996, and a Bachelor of Arts in history in 2006.

He later served on the board of directors of the UFV Alumni Association, acting as chair from 2008 through 2013. He worked at BC Hydro for twenty six years, and subsequently as a consultant with Investors Group. Following his career in municipal politics, Luck worked as a real estate agent in Merritt. Luck is also involved in various organizations in his community including Community Futures Nicola Valley and the Chamber of Commerce where he worked to get legislation to address grow-op remediation and remediation resolutions to the Provincial Chamber of Commerce.

== Political career ==
=== 2005 provincial election ===
In 2005, Luck was the leader of the Emerged Democracy Party of British Columbia.

=== Municipal politics ===
Luck was a city councillor for Mission from 2012 through 2016. He ran for mayor in the 2014 municipal election, but was unsuccessful. He was a city councillor for Merritt from 2018 through 2022, and ran for mayor of the city in the 2022 municipal election, coming in second place. He has also held leadership positions in the Fraser Valley Regional District and Southern Interior Local Government Association (SILGA). During his time with SILGA he led discussions around improvements to the Emergency Management BC and ESS. He describes his leadership style as "management by walking around" which entails listening face to face with constituents.

=== 2024 provincial election ===
In March 2024, Luck was nominated as the Conservative Party of BC's candidate for the riding of Fraser-Nicola. He went on to win a seat in the Legislative Assembly of BC securing 54.72% of the vote, defeating NDP hopeful Francyne Joe.

Luck served in the official opposition's shadow cabinet as the Critic for Municipal Affairs and Local Government. His policy priorities included fiscal responsibility and fair taxation policies, healthcare reform to improve access to quality healthcare services, and affordable housing.

=== 2026 provincial election ===
Luck was re-elected in the 2026 British Columbia general election with 58.18% of the vote, far ahead of the NDP's Jason Leboe. Following the election, Luck was made Deputy Speaker of the British Columbia Legislative Assembly and Chair of the committee of the whole.

== Electoral record ==
2024 British Columbia general election: Fraser-Nicola
Party	Candidate	Votes	%	±%	Expenditures
Conservative	Tony Luck	10,326	54.34	+53.0	$32,836.48
New Democratic	Francyne Joe	6,917	36.40	-5.4	$20,978.31
Green	Jonah Timms	1,761	9.27	-3.0	$4,020.93
Total valid votes/expense limit		19,004	99.86	–	$71,700.08
Total rejected ballots		27	0.14	–	
Turnout		19,031	56.74	–	
Registered voters		33,542			
Conservative notional gain from New Democratic		Swing		+29.2	
Source: Elections BC

== See also ==
- 43rd Parliament of British Columbia
