= George Whittaker (Canadian politician) =

Canadian politician

Member of the Canadian Parliament for Okanagan Boundary
- In office 1972–1979
- Preceded by: Bruce Howard

Member of the Canadian Parliament for Okanagan North
- In office 1979–1980
- Succeeded by: Vincent Dantzer

Personal details
- Born: 22 December 1919 Bon Accord, Alberta
- Died: 26 August 2013 (aged 93) Kelowna, British Columbia
- Party: Progressive Conservative Party of Canada
- Spouse(s): Anna Marie Moore; Betty May Jackman
- Profession: orchardist

George Herbert Whittaker (22 December 1919 – 26 August 2013) was a Progressive Conservative party member of the House of Commons of Canada. He was an orchardist and farmer by career.

He represented British Columbia's Okanagan Boundary electoral district which he won in the 1972 federal election. He was re-elected in the 1974 and 1979 federal elections, thus serving three successive terms from the 29th to 31st Canadian Parliaments.

Whittaker left national politics in 1980 and did not campaign in that year's national elections. He died in Kelowna in 2013. He was 93.
