= Yale (provincial electoral district) =

Defunct provincial electoral district in British Columbia, Canada

Yale was a provincial electoral district in British Columbia, Canada, from the province's joining Confederation in 1871. It was a three-member constituency and retained the name Yale until the 1894 election, at which time it was split into three ridings, Yale-East, Yale-North, and Yale-West; other ridings in the southeast of the province had previously been split off, e.g., Fernie, Ymir, Grand Forks, which later emerged or were rearranged into the various Kootenay and Okanagan ridings. In 1903 the name Yale (by itself) was revived, this time as a one-member riding only, the new riding largely based upon Yale-West. Its last appearance on the hustings was 1963. In 1966, it was amalgamated into the new riding of Yale-Lillooet, which was extant until 2009, when most of its core area was made part of the new Fraser-Nicola riding.

== Geography ==
The original Yale riding encompassed the whole of today's Kootenay, Okanagan, Similkameen, Thompson and Nicola regions, plus its original core in the Fraser Canyon, south from and including Lytton. The riding's name is from the town of Yale, then still an important centre in the new province and in fact one of the very few actual towns in the riding at the time.

== Notable MLAs ==
- Charles Augustus Semlin (12th Premier 1915–1928, first elected 1871)
- John Andrew Mara
- Forbes George Vernon (namesake of the city of Vernon)
- Richard McBride (1909, incumbent/16th Premier 1903–1915)
- John Duncan MacLean (20th Premier, 1920–1921)
- William Leonard Hartley

== Notable candidates ==
- Gilbert Malcolm Sproat, native claims commissioner

== Election results ==
Note: Winners of each election are in bold.

1st 1871 British Columbia general election
Party	Candidate	Votes	%	±	Expenditures
Independent	George Coxon ^{1}	29	16.96%		unknown
Independent	William H. Kay	8	4.68%		unknown
Independent	Moses Lumby	17	9.94%		unknown
**Independent**	**James Robinson**	**35**	**20.47%**		unknown
**Independent**	**Charles Augustus Semlin**	**29**	**16.96%**		unknown
**Independent**	**Robert Smith**	**53**	**30.99%**		unknown
Total valid votes		171	100.00%		
Total rejected ballots					
Turnout		%			
^{1} The Returning Officer cast the deciding vote for Semlin, who had the same number of votes.

1875 British Columbia general election
Party	Candidate	Votes	%	Elected
Reform caucus	John Andrew Mara	130	20.57	✓
Reform caucus	Forbes George Vernon	125	19.78	✓
Independent Government	Robert Smith	117	18.57	✓
Reform	John F. Allison	100	15.82	
Independent Government	Charles Augustus Semlin	94	14.87	
Independent Government	James Robinson	59	9.34	
Independent	James Ross	7	1.1	
Total valid votes		632	100.00	

3rd 1878 British Columbia general election
Party	Candidate	Votes	%	±	Expenditures
Government	**Preston Bennett**	**158**	**20.05%**	–	unknown
Opposition	Dixon Joseph Lauder	87	11.04%	–	unknown
Opposition	William McCormack	93	11.80%	–	unknown
Government	**John Andrew Mara**	**172**	**21.83%**	–	unknown
Opposition	Charles Augustus Semlin	120	15.23%	–	unknown
Government	**Forbes George Vernon**	**158**	**20.05%**	–	unknown
Total valid votes		788	100.00%		
Total rejected ballots					
Turnout		%			

4th 1882 British Columbia general election
Party	Candidate	Votes	%	±	Expenditures
Government	**Preston Bennett**	**194**	**19.56%**	–	unknown
Independent	Henry Dodson Green-Armytage	98	9.88%		
Government	William McGirr	60	6.05%	–	unknown
Government	**John Andrew Mara**	**240**	**24.19%**	–	unknown
Government	Edward Peason	78	7.86%	–	unknown
**Independent**	**Charles Augustus Semlin**	**254**	**25.60%**		unknown
Independent	Gilbert Malcolm Sproat	68	6.86%		unknown
Total valid votes		992	100.00%		
Total rejected ballots					
Turnout		%			

British Columbia By-election: Yale November 15, 1882 ^{2}
Party	Candidate	Votes	%	±	Expenditures
Government	Thomas Basil Humphreys	157	39.15%	–	unknown
Opposition	**George Bohun Martin**	**244**	**60.05%**	–	unknown
Total valid votes		401	100.00%		
Total rejected ballots					
Turnout		%			
^{2} Death of Preston Bennett August 9, 1882.

5th 1886 British Columbia general election
Party	Candidate	Votes	%	±	Expenditures
Government	Archibald Irwin	196	14.91%	–	unknown
Government	**George Bohun Martin**	**283**	**21.54%**	–	unknown
Opposition	Henry Nicholson	93	7.08%	–	unknown
Opposition	Thomas Roadley	88	6.77%	–	unknown
Opposition	**Charles Augustus Semlin**	**364**	**27.70%**	–	unknown
Government	**Forbes George Vernon**	**290**	**22.07%**	–	unknown
Total valid votes		1,314	100.00%		
Total rejected ballots					
Turnout		%			

6th 1890 British Columbia general election
Party	Candidate	Votes	%	±	Expenditures
Opposition	Irwin Archibald	256	13.17%	–	unknown
Government	**George Bohun Martin**	**445**	**22.89%**	–	unknown
Opposition	**Charles Augustus Semlin**	**396**	**20.37%**	–	unknown
Government	**Forbes George Vernon**	**496**	**25.51%**	–	unknown
Government	James Wardle	351	18.06%	–	unknown
Total valid votes		1,944	100.00%		
Total rejected ballots					
Turnout		%			

7th 1894 British Columbia general election

split to three ridings:

- Yale-East
- Yale-West
- Yale-North

8th 1898 British Columbia general election

- Yale-East
- Yale-West
- Yale-North

9th 1900 British Columbia general election

- Yale-East
- Yale-West
- Yale-North

10th 1903 British Columbia general election ^{4}
Party	Candidate	Votes	%	±	Expenditures
**Liberal**	**Stuart Alexander Henderson**	**309**	**60.59%**		unknown
Conservative	Thomas Gray McManamon	201	39.41%		unknown
Total valid votes		510	100.00%		
Total rejected ballots					
Turnout		%			
^{4}Restored seat reduced to one member only; successor to Yale-West

11th 1907 British Columbia general election
Party	Candidate	Votes	%	±	Expenditures
**Liberal**	**Stuart Alexander Henderson**	**289**	**58.27%**		unknown
Conservative	Charles Augustus Semlin	207	41.73%		unknown
Total valid votes		496	100.00%		
Total rejected ballots					
Turnout		%			

12th 1909 British Columbia general election
Party	Candidate	Votes	%	±	Expenditures
Liberal	Stuart Alexander Henderson	265	36.81%		unknown
**Conservative**	**Richard McBride**	**455**	**63.19%**		unknown
Total valid votes		720	100.00%		
Total rejected ballots					
Turnout		%			

13th 1912 British Columbia general election
Party	Candidate	Votes	%	±	Expenditures
**Conservative**	**Alexander Lucas**	**524**	**65.26%**		unknown
Liberal	John P. McConnell	279	34.74%		unknown
Total valid votes		281	100.00%		
Total rejected ballots					
Turnout		71.98%			

14th 1916 British Columbia general election
Party	Candidate	Votes	%	±	Expenditures
Conservative	Alexander Lucas	609	42.95%		unknown
**Liberal**	**Joseph Walters**	**809**	**57.05%**		unknown
Total valid votes		1,418	100.00%		
Total rejected ballots					
Turnout		%			

15th 1920 British Columbia general election
Party	Candidate	Votes	%	±	Expenditures
Liberal	James Robert Cameron	737	31.95%		unknown
**Conservative**	**John McRae**	**913**	**39.58%**		unknown
Independent Liberal	Joseph Walters	657	28.48%		
Total valid votes		2,307	100.00%		

1924 British Columbia general election
Party	Candidate	Votes	%
Liberal	John Duncan MacLean	1,148	46.09
Conservative	John McRae	765	30.71
Provincial	James Sugrue Fagan	578	23.20
Total valid votes		2,491	100.00

17th 1928 British Columbia general election
Party	Candidate	Votes	%	±	Expenditures
**Liberal**	**John Joseph Alban Gillis**	**1,514**	**57.22%**		unknown
Conservative	Romald Helmerow Helmer	1,132	42.78%		unknown
Total valid votes		2,646	100.00%		
Total rejected ballots		27			
Turnout		%			

18th 1933 British Columbia general election
Party	Candidate	Votes	%	±	Expenditures
**Liberal**	**John Joseph Alban Gillis**	**1,193**	**68.64%**		unknown
Non-Partisan Independent Group	Romald Helmerow Helmer	312	17.95%	–	unknown
Co-operative Commonwealth Fed.	John Wise Langley	233	13.41%		unknown
Total valid votes		1,738	100.00%		
Total rejected ballots		23			
Turnout		%			

19th 1937 British Columbia general election
Party	Candidate	Votes	%	±	Expenditures
**Liberal**	**John Joseph Alban Gillis**	**968**	**59.94%**		unknown
Co-operative Commonwealth Fed.	John Wise Langley	422	26.13%		unknown
Conservative	John Wilson North	225	13.93%		unknown
Total valid votes		1,615	100.00%		
Total rejected ballots		40			
Turnout		%			

20th 1941 British Columbia general election
Party	Candidate	Votes	%	±	Expenditures
Conservative	Alexander Rennie Ross Craig	616	34.92%		unknown
**Liberal**	**John Joseph Alban Gillis**	**1,148**	**65.08%**		unknown
Total valid votes		1,764	100.00%		
Total rejected ballots		55			
Turnout		%			

21st 1945 British Columbia general election
Party	Candidate	Votes	%	±	Expenditures
**Liberal**	**John Joseph Alban Gillis**	**1077**	**34.92%**		unknown
Co-operative Commonwealth Fed.	Angus Hugh MacIsaac	536	33.23%		unknown
Total valid votes		1,613	100.00%		
Total rejected ballots		63			
Turnout		%			

22nd 1949 British Columbia general election
Party	Candidate	Votes	%	±	Expenditures
Coalition	**John Joseph Alban Gillis**	**1,407**	**46.90%**	–	unknown
Co-operative Commonwealth Fed.	Angus Hugh MacIsaac	865	28.83%		unknown
Independent	William John Trout	728	24.27%		unknown
Total valid votes		3,000	100.00%		
Total rejected ballots		42			
Turnout		%			

23rd British Columbia election, 1952^{2}
Party	Candidate	Votes 1st count	%	Votes final count	%	±%	
Progressive Conservative	Bernard (Ben) Cherry	338	10.74%	-	-%		unknown
Social Credit League	**Irvine Finlay Corbett**	**1,024**	**32.53%**	**1,390**	**51.46%**		
Liberal	John Joseph Allan Gillis	1,067	33.89%	1,311	48.54%		unknown
Co-operative Commonwealth Fed.	Angus Hugh MacIsaac	659	20.93%	-	-%		unknown
Independent	George Murray	60	1.91%	-	-%		unknown
Total valid votes		3,148	%	2,701	100.00%		
Total rejected ballots		98					
Turnout		%					
^{2} Preferential ballot — final count is between top two candidates from earlier counts; intermediary counts (of 4) not shown.

24th British Columbia election, 1953 ^{3}
Party	Candidate	Votes 1st count	%	Votes final count	%	±%	
Social Credit	**Irvine Finlay Corbett**	**1,177**	**39.86%**	**1,354**	**54.36%**		
Co-operative Commonwealth Federation	Evan Donald MacDougall	835	28.28%	-	%		unknown
Total valid votes		2,953	100.00%	2,491	%		
Total rejected ballots		278					
Total Registered Voters		5,933 (1952 list)					
Turnout		70.15%					
^{3} Preferential ballot; final count is between top two candidates from first count; intermediary counts (of 3) not shown

25th 1956 British Columbia general election
Party	Candidate	Votes	%	±	Expenditures
Social Credit	**Irvine Finlay Corbett**	**1,315**	**47.34**	–	unknown
Co-operative Commonwealth Fed.	Joe Madden	599	21.56%		unknown
Liberal	Olga McLean	703	25.31%		unknown
Conservative	Kenneth Moyes	161	5.80%		unknown
Total valid votes		2,778	100.00%		
Total rejected ballots		61			
Turnout		%			

26th 1960 British Columbia general election
Party	Candidate	Votes	%	±	Expenditures
Liberal	John Allan Collett	964	27.30%		unknown
Social Credit	**Irvine Finlay Corbett**	**1,103**	**31.24%**	–	unknown
Conservative	William Joseph Lauder	390	11.05%		unknown
Co-operative Commonwealth Fed.	Evan Donald MacDougall	1,074	30.42%		unknown
Total valid votes		3,531	100.00%		
Total rejected ballots		107			
Turnout		%			

27th 1963 British Columbia general election
Party	Candidate	Votes	%	±	Expenditures
Liberal	John Allan Collett	599	13.10%		unknown
Social Credit	Irvine Finlay Corbett	1,691	36.99%	–	unknown
Conservative	John Willison Green	584	12.78%		unknown
**New Democrat**	**William Leonard Hartley**	**1,697**	**37.43%**		unknown
Total valid votes		4,571	100.00%		
Total rejected ballots		58			
Turnout		%			

Before the 28th general election in 1966, parts of the former riding of Yale became incorporated into the new riding of Yale-Lillooet, which survives to the present.

== See also ==
- List of British Columbia provincial electoral districts
- Canadian provincial electoral districts
- List of electoral districts in the Kootenays
- List of electoral districts in the Okanagan

Legislative Assembly of British Columbia
Preceded by Nelson	Constituency represented by the Premier of British Columbia; 1927–1928	Succeeded by Saanich
