= William Alfred Galliher =

Canadian politician

The Honourable William Alfred Galliher
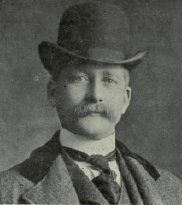

Member of the Canadian Parliament for Yale—Cariboo
- In office 1900–1904
- Preceded by: Hewitt Bostock
- Succeeded by: Duncan Ross

Member of the Canadian Parliament for Kootenay
- In office 1904–1908
- Preceded by: District was created in 1903
- Succeeded by: Arthur Samuel Goodeve

Personal details
- Born: July 26, 1860 Bruce County, Canada West
- Died: November 23, 1934 (aged 74)
- Party: Liberal

William Alfred Galliher (July 26, 1860 – November 23, 1934) was a Canadian lawyer, judge and Liberal politician. Gallier was born in Bruce County, Canada West. In 1885, he served as part of the British Nile contingent under General Wolseley.

The son of Francis Galliher and Sarah Kirkpatrick, he was educated in Walkerton and Collingwood. He moved to western Canada, studied law and was called to the Manitoba bar in 1887, to the bar for the Northwest Territories in 1889 and to the British Columbia bar in 1897. Galliher practised law in Nelson and Victoria. In 1907, he married Margaret Louise Brown. He was a partner of noted lawyer Charles F. P. Conybeare from 1888 to 1887.

Galliher was elected as MP for Yale—Cariboo in 1900, despite running against "Independent-Labour" candidate Christopher Foley, who threatened to split the Liberal vote. After the Kootenay riding was split off from Yale Cariboo in 1904, Galliher was reelected there and remained in the House until 1908.

In 1909, he was named judge in the British Columbia Court of Appeal. Galliher died in Victoria at the age of 74.
