= Club Atletico Yale =

Club Atlético Yale is a Uruguayan basketball team.

== History ==
Club Atlético Yale was founded on February 12, 1940, making it one of the oldest basketball teams in Uruguay. The club is based in the Jacinto Vera neighbourhood in Montevideo. It was named after Yale University in the United States of America, where several of the first members graduated from.

The club holds one third-division title and played one season (1999) in the Federal Championship (the previous main basketball tournament in Uruguay). Since then, the club has played in the Metropolitan League (2nd Division).

Notable former players include Leandro Taboada, Agustin Iglesias, and Emilio Taboada.
