= USS Yale =

Two ships of the United States Navy have been named USS Yale:

- USS Yale (1889) was a steamship chartered by the Navy for several months in 1898, for action in the Spanish–American War.
- USS Yale (1906) was a steamship purchased in 1918 and used as a troop transport until 1920. After some years in civilian service, the ship was re-acquired in 1943 and operated as Greyhound (IX-406) until 1948.
