= Fraser-Nicola =

Provincial electoral district in British Columbia, Canada

British Columbia electoral district
- Interactive map of riding boundaries

Provincial electoral district
- Legislature: Legislative Assembly of British Columbia
MLA
Tony Luck
Conservative
- District created: 2008
- First contested: 2009
- Last contested: 2026

Demographics
- Population (2021): 42,562
- Area (km²): 2,781
- Pop. density (per km²): 15.3
- Census division(s): Fraser Valley, Squamish-Lillooet, Thompson-Nicola
- Census subdivision(s): Hope, Lillooet, Merritt

Fraser-Nicola is a provincial electoral district in British Columbia that has been represented in the Legislative Assembly of British Columbia since 2009.

Created under the 2008 British Columbia electoral redistribution, the riding was first contested in the 2009 general election. It was created from parts of Cariboo South, Kamloops, Kamloops-North Thompson and Yale-Lillooet.

== Demographics ==
Population, 2021	42,562
Area (km^{2})	2,781
Pop. Density (people per km^{2})	15
Source: BC Electoral Boundaries Commission

== Geography ==
The district comprises the southwestern portion of the Thompson-Nicola Regional District, eastern portion of the Squamish-Lillooet Regional District and the eastern portion of the Fraser Valley Regional District. It is located in southern British Columbia. Communities in the electoral district consist of Merritt, Hope, Lillooet, Logan Lake, Lytton, Ashcroft, and Cache Creek.

== Members of the Legislative Assembly ==
Because of the re-alignment of electoral boundaries, most incumbents did not represent the entirety of their listed district during the preceding legislative term. Harry Lali, first elected in the 2005 election to the Yale-Lillooet riding, became the district's first MLA. He was defeated by Jackie Tegart in the 2013 election.

Assembly	Years	Member	Party
Fraser-Nicola; Riding created from Cariboo South, Kamloops, Kamloops-North Thompson and Yale-Lillooet
39th	2009–2013	Harry Lali	New Democratic
40th	2013–2017	Jackie Tegart	Liberal
41st	2017–2020	Jackie Tegart	Liberal
42nd	2020–2023	Jackie Tegart	Liberal
42nd	2023–2024	Jackie Tegart	BC United
43rd	2024–2026	Tony Luck	Conservative
44th	2026–present	Tony Luck	Conservative

== Electoral history ==
2026 British Columbia general election
The 2026 general election will be held on October 24.
Party	Candidate	Votes	%	±%	Expenditures
Conservative	Tony Luck	9,487	58.63		
New Democratic	Jason Leboe	4,548	28.11		
Green	Patrick Michell	2,114	13.06		
Total valid votes		16,149	99.80		
Total rejected ballots		32	0.20		
Turnout					
Registered voters					
Source: Elections BC

2024 British Columbia general election
Party	Candidate	Votes	%	±%	Expenditures
Conservative	Tony Luck	10,326	54.34	+53.0	$32,836.48
New Democratic	Francyne Joe	6,917	36.40	-5.4	$20,978.31
Green	Jonah Timms	1,761	9.27	-3.0	$4,020.93
Total valid votes/expense limit		19,004	99.86	–	$71,700.08
Total rejected ballots		27	0.14	–	
Turnout		19,031	56.74	–	
Registered voters		33,542			
Conservative notional gain from New Democratic		Swing		+29.2	
Source: Elections BC

2020 provincial election redistributed results
Party	%
New Democratic	41.8
Liberal	35.9
Green	12.3
Conservative	1.3
Others	8.7

2020 British Columbia general election
Party	Candidate	Votes	%	±%	Expenditures
Liberal	Jackie Tegart	5,696	41.64	−0.15	$40,524.05
New Democratic	Aaron Sumexheltza	5,414	39.58	+1.11	$30,637.56
Green	Jonah Timms	1,788	13.07	−2.89	$4,241.98
Independent	Dennis Adamson	438	3.20	–	$1,600.00
Independent	Mike Bhangu	343	2.51	–	$3,654.15
Total valid votes		13,679	99.35	–	
Total rejected ballots		89	0.65	+0.44	
Turnout		13,768	51.16	-12.88	
Registered voters		26,913			
Liberal hold		Swing		–0.63	
Source: Elections BC

2018 British Columbia electoral reform referendum
Side	Votes	%
First Past the Post	7,259	73.94
Proportional representation	2,558	26.06

2017 British Columbia general election
Party	Candidate	Votes	%	±%	Expenditures
Liberal	Jackie Tegart	6,597	41.79	−2.35	$47,914
New Democratic	Harry Lali	6,073	38.47	−1.15	$51,363
Green	Arthur Alexander Green	2,519	15.96	+6.30	$17,214
Social Credit	Michael Henshall	596	3.78	–	$5,848
Total valid votes		15,785	100.00		
Total rejected ballots		69	0.44		
Turnout		15,854	64.04		
Source: Elections BC

2013 British Columbia general election
Party	Candidate	Votes	%	±%	Expenditures
Liberal	Jackie Tegart	6,002	44.14	+1.42	$87,325
New Democratic	Harry Lali	5,388	39.62	−9.5	$79,802
Green	John Kidder	1,314	9.66	+3.13	$2,035
Conservative	Michael Beauclair	895	6.58	–	$2,628
Total valid votes		13,599	100.00		
Total rejected ballots		51	0.37		
Turnout		13,650	61.52		
Source: Elections BC

B.C. General Election 2009 Fraser-Nicola
Party	Candidate	Votes	%	±	Expenditures
NDP	Harry Lali	6,703	49.12%		$68,069
Liberal	Ella Brown	5,830	42.72%	–	$108,877
Green	Desiree Maher-Schley	891	6.53%	–	$648
Refederation	Dian Brooks	223	1.63%	–	$260
Total Valid Votes		13,647	100%		
Total Rejected Ballots		82	0.60%		
Turnout		13,729	63.38%		

== See also ==
- List of British Columbia provincial electoral districts
- Canadian provincial electoral districts
