= Okanagan North (federal electoral district) =

Former federal electoral district in British Columbia, Canada

Coordinates: 50.838°N 119.174°W

British Columbia electoral district

Defunct federal electoral district
- Legislature: House of Commons
- District created: 1976
- District abolished: 1987
- First contested: 1979
- Last contested: 1984

Okanagan North was a federal electoral district in the province of British Columbia, Canada, that was represented in the House of Commons of Canada from 1979 to 1988. This riding was created in 1976 from parts of Kamloops—Cariboo, Okanagan Boundary and Okanagan—Kootenay ridings. It was abolished in 1987 when it was redistributed into Okanagan Centre and Okanagan—Shuswap ridings.

It consisted of the North Okanagan Regional District and part of the Central Okanagan Regional District lying east of Electoral Area G and Electoral Area H. It became part of Okanagan Centre in 1987

== Members of Parliament ==
Parliament	Years	Member	Party
Riding created from Kamloops—Cariboo, Okanagan Boundary and Okanagan—Kootenay
31st	1979–1980	George Whittaker	Progressive Conservative
32nd	1980–1984	Vincent Dantzer	Progressive Conservative
33rd	1984–1988	Vincent Dantzer	Progressive Conservative
Riding dissolved into Okanagan Centre and Okanagan—Shuswap

== Election results ==
1984 Canadian federal election
Party	Candidate	Votes	%	±%
Progressive Conservative	Vincent Dantzer	35,904	56.07	+7.37
New Democratic	Eileen Robinson	17,168	26.81	–2.32
Liberal	Peta J. Willson	9,935	15.52	–6.65
Social Credit	Ben S. Bissett	1,025	1.60	–
Total valid votes		64,032	99.65	
Total rejected ballots		227	0.35	+0.13
Turnout		64,259	76.03	+7.24
Eligible voters		84,518		
Progressive Conservative hold		Swing		+4.85
Source: Elections Canada

1980 Canadian federal election
Party	Candidate	Votes	%	±%
Progressive Conservative	Vincent Dantzer	24,983	48.70	–2.77
New Democratic	John O. Powell	14,944	29.13	+5.97
Liberal	Otto H. Hack	11,368	22.16	–3.21
Total valid votes		51,295	99.78	
Total rejected ballots		115	0.22	+0.06
Turnout		51,410	68.79	–4.39
Eligible voters		74,740		
Progressive Conservative hold		Swing		–4.37
Source: Elections Canada

1979 Canadian federal election
Party	Candidate	Votes	%	±%
Progressive Conservative	George Whittaker	26,560	51.47	–
Liberal	Richard Bullock	13,091	25.37	–
New Democratic	John O. Powell	11,951	23.16	–
Total valid votes		51,602	99.83	
Total rejected ballots		86	0.17	–
Turnout		51,688	73.17	–
Eligible voters		70,638		
This riding was created from parts of Kamloops—Cariboo, Okanagan Boundary and Okanagan—Kootenay, which elected two Progressive Conservatives and one Liberal (Kamloops—Cariboo). George Whittaker was the incumbent from Okanagan Boundary.
Source: Elections Canada

== See also ==
- List of Canadian electoral districts
- Historical federal electoral districts of Canada
