= Okanagan Boundary =

Former federal electoral district in British Columbia, Canada

British Columbia electoral district

Defunct federal electoral district
- Legislature: House of Commons
- District created: 1952
- District abolished: 1976
- First contested: 1953
- Last contested: 1974

Okanagan Boundary was a federal electoral district in British Columbia, Canada, that was represented in the House of Commons of Canada from 1953 to 1979. The riding (as electoral districts are colloquially called in English Canada) was created in 1952 from parts of Kamloops and Yale ridings. It was abolished in 1976 when it was redistributed into Fraser Valley East, Kootenay West, Okanagan North and Okanagan—Similkameen ridings.

The 1962 contest was an unusual event, featuring four candidate all having previous served in the House of commons.

- Incumbent Progressive Conservative MP David Vaughan Pugh was first elected in the 1953 election
- NDP candididate Owen Jones was Pugh's predecessor, and was the MP for predecessor district Yale 1948–53
- Social Credit candidate Frederick Davis Shaw moved to the area after electoral defeat ended an 18-year parliamentary tenure as MP for Red Deer, Alberta from 1940 to 1958.
- Liberal candidate Elmore Philpott moved to the area after failing to recapture his Vancouver South in 1958, for which he was MP from 1953 to 1957. Decades earlier he was the runner-up in the 1930 Ontario Liberal Party leadership election.

== Members of Parliament ==
Parliament	Years	Member	Party
Riding created from Kamloops and Yale
22nd	1953–1957	Owen Jones	Co-operative Commonwealth
23rd	1957–1958	Frank Christian	Social Credit
24th	1958–1962	David Vaughan Pugh	Progressive Conservative
25th	1962–1963	David Vaughan Pugh	Progressive Conservative
26th	1963–1965	David Vaughan Pugh	Progressive Conservative
27th	1965–1968	David Vaughan Pugh	Progressive Conservative
28th	1968–1972	Bruce Howard	Liberal
29th	1972–1974	George Whittaker	Progressive Conservative
30th	1974–1979	George Whittaker	Progressive Conservative
Riding dissolved into Fraser Valley East, Kootenay West, Okanagan North and Okanagan—Similkameen

== Election results ==
1974 Canadian federal election
Party	Candidate	Votes	%	±%
Progressive Conservative	George Whittaker	23,089	43.17	+0.67
Liberal	John Dyck	19,421	36.31	+6.80
New Democratic	Arnet Tuffs	8,975	16.78	–11.22
Social Credit	Violet R. Sharp	2,002	3.74	–
Total valid votes		53,487	99.67	
Total rejected ballots		178	0.33	–0.52
Turnout		53,665	71.67	–2.70
Eligible voters		74,876		
Progressive Conservative hold		Swing		–3.06
Source: Library of Parliament

1972 Canadian federal election
Party	Candidate	Votes	%	±%
Progressive Conservative	George Whittaker	20,468	42.49	+14.14
Liberal	Bruce Howard	14,213	29.51	–3.17
New Democratic	Bryan McIver	13,487	28.00	+0.21
Total valid votes		48,168	99.14	
Total rejected ballots		416	0.86	+0.16
Turnout		48,584	74.38	–5.47
Eligible voters		65,322		
Progressive Conservative gain from Liberal		Swing		+8.66
Source: Library of Parliament

1968 Canadian federal election
Party	Candidate	Votes	%	±%
Liberal	Bruce Howard	12,321	32.67	+12.08
Progressive Conservative	David Vaughan Pugh	10,691	28.35	–2.50
New Democratic	D.A. Alex Turner	10,481	27.79	+3.37
Social Credit	Dave Sparrow	4,217	11.18	–12.95
Total valid votes		37,710	99.31	
Total rejected ballots		263	0.69	+0.12
Turnout		37,973	79.85	+1.97
Eligible voters		47,555		
Liberal gain from Progressive Conservative		Swing		+7.28
Source: Library of Parliament

1965 Canadian federal election
Party	Candidate	Votes	%	±%
Progressive Conservative	David Vaughan Pugh	9,499	30.85	–2.22
New Democratic	D.A. Alex Turner	7,522	24.43	+3.25
Social Credit	Charles Edward Emery	7,431	24.13	–0.36
Liberal	Bruce Howard	6,343	20.60	–0.67
Total valid votes		30,795	99.43	
Total rejected ballots		176	0.57	+0.06
Turnout		30,971	77.88	–4.52
Eligible voters		39,767		
Progressive Conservative hold		Swing		–2.73
Source: Library of Parliament

1963 Canadian federal election
Party	Candidate	Votes	%	±%
Progressive Conservative	David Vaughan Pugh	10,031	33.06	+1.72
Social Credit	Frederick Davis Shaw	7,430	24.49	+1.10
Liberal	William Andrew Gilmour	6,453	21.27	+3.50
New Democratic	J.A. Young	6,425	21.18	–6.32
Total valid votes		30,339	99.49	
Total rejected ballots		156	0.51	–0.12
Turnout		30,495	82.40	+1.37
Eligible voters		37,010		
Progressive Conservative hold		Swing		+0.30
Source: Library of Parliament

1962 Canadian federal election
Party	Candidate	Votes	%	±%
Progressive Conservative	David Vaughan Pugh	9,069	31.35	–17.04
New Democratic	Owen Jones	7,956	27.50	–1.50
Social Credit	Frederick Davis Shaw	6,766	23.39	+10.53
Liberal	Elmore Philpott	5,141	17.77	+8.00
Total valid votes		28,932	99.37	
Total rejected ballots		183	0.63	+0.21
Turnout		29,115	81.03	–0.46
Eligible voters		35,932		
Progressive Conservative hold		Swing		–7.78
Source: Library of Parliament

1958 Canadian federal election
Party	Candidate	Votes	%	±%
Progressive Conservative	David Vaughan Pugh	13,065	48.39	+22.40
Co-operative Commonwealth	Owen Jones	7,829	29.00	–0.95
Social Credit	Henry Carson	3,470	12.85	–17.61
Liberal	William Andrew Gilmour	2,637	9.77	–3.85
Total valid votes		27,001	99.58	
Total rejected ballots		114	0.42	–0.04
Turnout		27,115	81.49	+4.70
Eligible voters		33,275		
Progressive Conservative gain from Social Credit		Swing		+11.68
Source: Library of Parliament

1957 Canadian federal election
Party	Candidate	Votes	%	±%
Social Credit	Frank Christian	7,465	30.46	–6.01
Co-operative Commonwealth	Owen Jones	7,340	29.95	–9.15
Progressive Conservative	David Vaughan Pugh	6,368	25.98	–
Liberal	Melville Joseph Butler	3,336	13.61	–10.82
Total valid votes		24,509	99.54	
Total rejected ballots		113	0.46	–0.39
Turnout		24,622	76.79	+6.23
Eligible voters		32,064		
Social Credit gain from Co-operative Commonwealth		Swing		+1.57
Source: Library of Parliament

1953 Canadian federal election
Party	Candidate	Votes	%	±%
Co-operative Commonwealth	Owen Jones	8,086	39.10	–
Social Credit	Ivor James Newman	7,543	36.47	–
Liberal	William Allen Rathbun	5,053	24.43	–
Total valid votes		20,682	99.15	–
Total rejected ballots		178	0.85	–
Turnout		20,860	70.56	
Eligible voters		29,562		
This electoral district was created from parts of Kamloops and Yale, which elected a Progressive Conservative and a Co-operative Commonwealth candidate, respectively, in the previous election. Owen Jones was the incumbent from Yale.
Source: Library of Parliament

== See also ==
- List of Canadian electoral districts
- Historical federal electoral districts of Canada
