= David Vaughan Pugh =

Canadian politician

- Official 1966 portrait

Member of Parliament for Okanagan Boundary
- In office March 1958 – April 1968

Personal details
- Born: 27 November 1907 Okotoks, Alberta, Canada
- Died: 21 June 2005 (aged 97)
- Party: Progressive Conservative
- Profession: barrister and solicitor, insurance agent

David Vaughan Pugh (27 November 1907 – 21 June 2005) was a Progressive Conservative party member of the House of Commons of Canada. He was born in Okotoks, Alberta and had a career as a solicitor, barrister, and insurance agent.

Pugh was educated at Trinity College School, Brentwood College and the University of British Columbia, from which he graduated in 1934. He then obtained his law degree from Osgoode Hall Law School and was a member of Kappa Alpha Society.

He was first elected at the Okanagan Boundary riding in the 1958 general election after an unsuccessful bid for the seat in 1957. Pugh was re-elected there in 1962, 1963 and 1965. He was defeated in the 1968 election by Bruce Howard of the Liberal party.
