= Yale-East =

Defunct provincial electoral district in British Columbia, Canada

Yale-East was a provincial electoral district in the British Columbia legislature that appeared only in the 1894, 1898 and 1900 elections. It and its sister ridings (Yale-West and Yale-North) were created from the older three-member Yale (provincial electoral district), which was one of the province's first twelve ridings as of 1871. For the 1903 election the riding-name Yale was restored on an adapted version of Yale-West. The area of Yale-East is now part of various ridings in the Nicola, Similkameen, and Okanagan areas.

== Election results ==
Note: Winners of each election are in bold.

7th British Columbia election, 1894
Party	Candidate	Votes	%	±	Expenditures
Opposition	**Donald Graham**	**417**	**50.79%**	–	unknown
Government	Forbes George Vernon	404	49.21%	–	unknown
Total valid votes		821	100.00%		
Total rejected ballots					
Turnout		%			

8th British Columbia election, 1898
Party	Candidate	Votes	%	±	Expenditures
Government	**Price Ellison**	**481**	**54.17%**	–	unknown
Opposition	Donald Graham	407	45.83%	–	unknown
Total valid votes		888	100.00%		
Total rejected ballots					
Turnout		%			

9th British Columbia election, 1900
Party	Candidate	Votes	%	±	Expenditures
Government	**Price Ellison**	**619**	**60.99%**	–	unknown
Progressive	Henry William Raymer	**45**	**4.43%**		unknown
Government	William Jessup Snodgrass	351	34.58%	–	unknown
Total valid votes		1,105	100.00%		
Total rejected ballots					
Turnout		%			

== See also ==
- List of British Columbia provincial electoral districts
- Canadian provincial electoral districts
- List of electoral districts in the Okanagan
- List of electoral districts in the Kootenays
