= Denis Murphy (Canadian politician) =

Canadian politician

Denis Murphy (June 30, 1870 – May 1, 1947) was a lawyer, judge and political figure in British Columbia. After being an unsuccessful candidate in the 1886 provincial election and an 1893 provincial byelection, he represented Yale-West in the Legislative Assembly of British Columbia from 1900 to 1902.

He was born in Lac La Hache, British Columbia, the son of Denis Murphy and Helen White, and was educated at Ottawa University. Murphy was called to the British Columbia bar in 1896. He practised in Victoria for about a year and then moved to Ashcroft, where he practised until 1909. In 1900, he married Maude Cameron. He was named to the provincial cabinet by Premier Edward Gawler Prior as Provincial Secretary and Minister of Education in November 1902, but resigned his cabinet posts a few days later. Murphy's resignation came as a surprise to Prior and his cabinet colleagues but he gave no explanation beyond "personal reasons". Murphy retired from politics returned to his law practice.

Murphy was named to the Supreme Court of British Columbia in 1909; he retired from the bench in 1941. He also served on the board of governors for the University of British Columbia. In 1911, Murphy submitted a letter in the Vancouver Law Students' Annual under the name "Quill" in support of instituting formal legal education in the province. He died in Vancouver at the age of 76.
