= Yale District =

British Columbia electoral district

Defunct federal electoral district
- Legislature: House of Commons
- District created: 1871
- District abolished: 1872
- First contested: 1871
- Last contested: 1871

Yale District was a federal electoral district in British Columbia, Canada, that was represented in the House of Commons of Canada from 1871 to 1872. The riding was created for a special byelection in 1871 and only used that once - and then only as an acclamation. In 1872, revisions to electoral districts in British Columbia replaced the riding by "Yale" riding, with exactly the same boundary. The official definition of the Yale District and Yale ridings (that is, the original Yale riding, not the second) is all of both the Yale and Kootenay Land Districts, which took in the whole of the province from the Fraser Canyon to the Rocky Mountains and including the Kamloops and Shuswap areas.

== Election results ==
Canadian federal by-election, 19 December 1871
Party	Candidate	Votes
Liberal	Charles Frederick Houghton	acclaimed

== See also ==
- List of Canadian federal electoral districts
- Historical federal electoral districts of Canada
