= Forbes George Vernon =

Canadian politician (1843–1911)

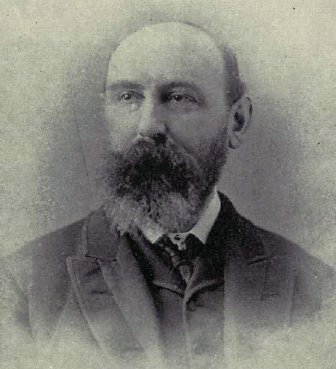

Member of the Legislative Assembly of British Columbia for Yale
- In office 1875–1882
- In office 1886–1894

Personal details
- Born: 21 August 1843 Dublin, Ireland
- Died: 20 January 1911 (aged 67) London, England
- Spouse: Katie Alma Branks (m. 1877; died 1885)
- Children: 2
- Occupation: Politician

Military service
- Allegiance: United Kingdom
- Branch/service: British Army
- Rank: Lieutenant

Forbes George Vernon (21 August 1843 – 20 January 1911), Lieutenant (ret.) British Army, was a Member of the Legislative Assembly of the Canadian province of British Columbia from 1875 to 1882, and from 1886 to 1894, representing the riding of Yale. He ran for the constituency of Yale-East in 1894 following a redistribution, but was defeated by Donald Graham. He never sought provincial office again.

== Early life ==
Forbes George was the third of five sons born to John Edward Venables Vernon of Clontarf Castle in the north of Dublin, by his first wife Louisa Catherine Bowles.

== Career ==
On 4 March 1863 Vernon wrote to the Colonial Office enquiring about land regulations in British Columbia, where free grants of up to 1,440 acres (6 km^{2}) were available to military settlers with at least the rank of captain. He arrived in British Columbia the following September, with his elder brother Charles Albert Vernon (1840–1906) and their friend Charles Frederick Houghton. Vernon's original homestead of 160 acres (0.6 km^{2}), near the city which bears his name, grew to become the 13,000 acre (53 km^{2}) Coldstream Ranch, which he sold in 1891 to Lord Aberdeen.

In 1876, he was named Chief Commissioner of Lands and Works in the provincial cabinet and served until 1878. He later served in the same cabinet post from 1887 to 1894. After retiring from politics, Vernon served as Agent General for the province of British Columbia in London from 1895 to 1899.

== Personal life ==
He was married at Victoria 11 September 1877 to Katie Alma Branks of California; she died 31 March 1885 and was buried at Victoria. They had two daughters: Gladys Louise (1878–1892); and Beatrice Alma Ashley (1881–????), who went on to marry Captain Montague Furber.

== Death and legacy ==
Vernon died in London in 1911. The northern Okanagan city of Vernon was named after him.
