= Francis John Deane =

Canadian publisher and politician (1867–1913)

Member of the Legislative Assembly of British Columbia for Yale-North
- In office 1898–1900

Personal details
- Born: August 8, 1867 Madras, British India
- Died: April 10, 1913 (aged 45) New Westminster, British Columbia, Canada
- Occupation: Newspaper publisher; editor; politician

Francis John Deane (8 August 1867 – 10 April 1913) was a newspaper publisher and political figure in British Columbia. He represented Yale-North in the Legislative Assembly of British Columbia from 1898 to 1900.

== Early life ==
He was born on 8 August 1867 in Madras, British India, the son of Francis J. Deane, and was educated in Bruges, Belgium. Deane worked as a farm labourer in Minnesota and the Canadian prairies before coming to British Columbia in 1889.

== Career ==
He worked for the Nanaimo Free Press and the Victoria Province before becoming editor and managing director of the Kamloops Inland Sentinel.

He was defeated when he ran for reelection in 1900 and again in the 1903 provincial election. In 1902, Deane purchased the Nelson Daily Miner, later renamed the Daily News.

In 1894, Canadian Pacific (CP) had acquired the Canadian rights to the Associated Press wire service. Existing news report services which included Canadian news were discontinued and the new service was offered at a higher price. This led to the creation of the Western Associated Press, based in Winnipeg. However, newspapers further west were limited by CP's control of telegraph services. Deane complained in print about the unreliability and high price of CP's wire service. CP threatened to discontinue service if the complaints continue. Finally, in October 1907, following an appeal to Prime Minister Wilfrid Laurier by a group of publishers of newspapers in Western Canada including Deane, a compromise was reached.

In 1908, he sold the Nelson newspaper and became owner and managing editor of the weekly Cranbrook Herald.

== Death ==
Deane died on 10 April 1913 of heart failure in New Westminster at the age of 45.
