= Robert Francis Green =

Canadian politician (1861–1946)

The Honourable Robert Francis Green
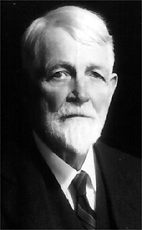

Member of the Legislative Assembly of British Columbia
- In office 1898–1903
- Constituency: West Kootenay-Slocan
- In office 1903–1907
- Succeeded by: Neil Franklin MacKay
- Constituency: Kaslo

Member of Parliament for Kootenay
- In office 1912–1917
- Preceded by: Arthur Samuel Goodeve

Member of Parliament for Kootenay West
- In office 1917–1921
- Succeeded by: Levi William Humphrey

Canadian Senator from British Columbia
- In office October 3, 1921 – October 5, 1946

Personal details
- Born: November 14, 1861 Peterborough, Canada West
- Died: October 5, 1946 (aged 84) Victoria, British Columbia, Canada
- Party: Conservative
- Relations: Howard Charles Green (nephew)
- Profession: Merchant; businessman

Robert Francis Green (November 14, 1861 – October 5, 1946) was a Canadian businessman and Conservative politician, born in Peterborough, Canada West. From 1893 to 1897, Green served three terms as mayor of Kaslo, British Columbia. He was a member of the Legislative Assembly of British Columbia from 1898 to 1907, representing the ridings of first West Kootenay-Slocan then Kaslo. After the 1903 BC elections, Green was part of the government of Richard McBride, and was appointed Minister of Mines (June to November 1903), Education (June to September 1903), Lands and Works (November 1903 to December 1906), and Provincial Secretary (June to September 1903).

== Background ==
He was elected MP for Kootenay in 1912 and re-elected in the successor riding Kootenay West in 1917. At the end of that term in 1921, he was appointed to the Senate, where he served until his death at the age of 86.

Parliament of Canada
Preceded by Arthur Samuel Goodeve	Member of Parliament from Kootenay; 1912–1917	Succeeded by riding distributed into Kootenay West and Kootenay East
Preceded by riding created out of Kootenay	Member of Parliament from Kootenay West; 1917–1921	Succeeded by Levi Humphrey
