= Martin Burrell =

Canadian politician

The Honourable Martin Burrell PC
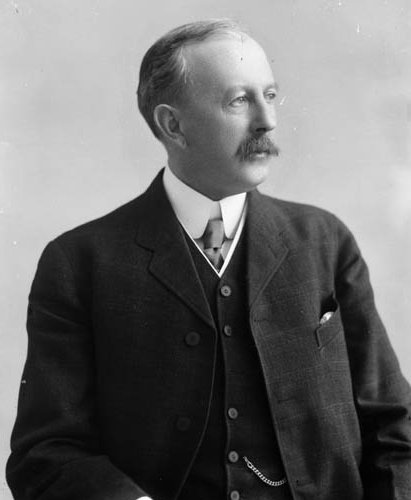

Member of the Canadian Parliament for Yale—Cariboo
- In office 26 October 1908 – 16 December 1917
- Preceded by: Duncan Ross
- Succeeded by: District abolished

Member of the Canadian Parliament for Yale
- In office 17 December 1917 – 7 July 1920
- Preceded by: District created
- Succeeded by: John Armstrong MacKelvie

Minister of Agriculture
- In office 16 October 1911 – 11 October 1917
- Prime Minister: Robert Borden
- Preceded by: Sydney Arthur Fisher
- Succeeded by: Thomas Crerar

Secretary of State for Canada
- In office 12 October 1917 – 30 December 1919
- Prime Minister: Robert Borden
- Preceded by: Arthur Meighen
- Succeeded by: Arthur Sifton

Minister of Mines
- In office 12 October 1917 – 30 December 1919
- Prime Minister: Robert Borden
- Preceded by: Arthur Meighen
- Succeeded by: Arthur Meighen

Minister of Customs and Inland Revenue
- In office 31 December 1919 – 7 July 1920
- Prime Minister: Robert Borden
- Preceded by: John Dowsley Reid (Acting)
- Succeeded by: Rupert Wilson Wigmore

Parliamentary Librarian
- In office 1920–1938
- Preceded by: Martin Joseph Griffin
- Succeeded by: Francis Aubrey Hardy

Personal details
- Born: 19 October 1858 Faringdon, Berkshire (now Oxfordshire), England
- Died: 20 March 1938 (aged 79)
- Party: Conservative

Martin Burrell PC (19 October 1858 – 20 March 1938) was a Canadian politician.

Born in Faringdon, Berkshire (now Oxfordshire), Burrell emigrated to Canada as a young man, where he eventually became a fruit grower on a farm about two miles east of Grand Forks, British Columbia. His farm was the largest apple tree nursery in the province.

He was elected mayor of Grand Forks, British Columbia in 1903. He first ran unsuccessfully for the House of Commons of Canada as the Conservative candidate in the 1904 federal election for the constituency of Yale—Cariboo. He was elected in the 1908 federal election and re-elected in 1911. In 1917 he was re-elected as a Unionist.

Burrell served as the Minister of Agriculture in the Borden government from 1911 to 1917, and from 1917 to 1919, as Secretary of State of Canada and Minister of Mines. From 1919 to 1920, he was the Minister of Customs and Inland Revenue. He also helped secure the departure of the Komagata Maru, against those mistreating the passengers and prolonging the departure date.

A fire damaged the Parliament Buildings in 1917, and Burrell was badly injured in it. From that time he filled the position of librarian for the Library of Parliament. After leaving politics, he remained in Ottawa and kept the position of Parliamentary Librarian until his death in 1938. He is buried in Beechwood Cemetery.

Burrell Creek near Grand Forks, British Columbia, is named in his honour.

Political offices
Preceded by Sydney Arthur Fisher	Minister of Agriculture; 1911–1917	Succeeded by Thomas Crerar
Preceded by Arthur Meighen	Secretary of State for Canada; 1917–1919	Succeeded by Arthur Sifton
Preceded by Arthur Meighen	Minister of Mines; 1917–1919	Succeeded by Arthur Meighen
Preceded by John Dowsley Reid (Acting)	Minister of Customs and Inland Revenue; 1919–1920	Succeeded by Rupert Wilson Wigmore
Government offices
Preceded by Martin Joseph Griffin	Parliamentary Librarian; 1920–1938	Succeeded by Francis Aubrey Hardy
