= Yale (federal electoral district) =

Former federal electoral district in British Columbia, Canada

British Columbia electoral district

Defunct federal electoral district
- Legislature: House of Commons
- District created: 1917
- District abolished: 1953
- First contested: 1917
- Last contested: 1949

Yale was a federal electoral district in British Columbia, Canada, that was represented in the House of Commons of Canada from 1872 to 1892 and from 1917 to 1953.

It replaced the Yale District riding, which was created and filled by special byelection in 1871 at the time of BC's entry into the Canadian Confederation. Like the previous "Yale District" riding, the Yale riding spanned both Yale and Kootenay Land Districts, that is to say, the entirety of the southern province from the Fraser Canyon to the Rockies. It was last used in the 1891 election, and was merged in 1892 with the Cariboo riding to form the Yale—Cariboo riding.

That arrangement lasted until 1914 when a further redistribution separated Yale and Cariboo once again. This second incarnation was considerably smaller than the first because the Kootenay district was now in a different riding. The riding of Kootenay had been split off from what had been the original Yale riding in 1903.

The "new" Yale riding excluded the Town of Yale, and when it was reconstituted, coincided with the provincial Okanagan riding except for the city of Salmon Arm.

The new incarnation of Yale lasted until 1952, when the Yale name vanished from the House of Commons and the Okanagan ridings, Okanagan Boundary and Okanagan—Revelstoke were created. The core area of the old riding around the town of historic and once-important Yale, which had long since became depopulated by being bypassed by massive growth elsewhere, was attached to the Fraser Valley riding, then to its successor Fraser Valley East, and then to today's Chilliwack—Fraser Canyon. Yale was not in the second incarnation of the Yale riding when it was reconstituted in 1914.

== Demographics ==
Population, 1871	Population, 1961
Population change, 1871–1966	%
Area (km^{2})	
Population density in 1871 (people per km^{2})	0.0%

== History and political geography ==
This riding was created as Yale District in 1871 as a result of British Columbia joining Confederation. In 1872, it was abolished and replaced by "Yale" for the 1872 federal election. This original version of the riding covered both Yale and Kootenay Land Districts, in other words the whole of the southern portion of the province from the Fraser Canyon to the Rocky Mountains. It existed in this form until 1892, when Yale was amalgamated with Cariboo to form Yale—Cariboo, also known as "Yale and Cariboo" when recognized by the Speaker. The first election had only 62 voters, the second 109, and most of these were in the area of the Fraser Canyon towns of Boston Bar, Hope, Yale. The rest were a scattered handful of ranches and mining camps in the Okanagan, Nicola and Similkameen regions.

Under the Representation Act of 1892, the constituencies of Yale and Cariboo were united to form Yale—Cariboo. In 1914, that riding was broken up and the Yale and Cariboo riding-names were restored, although the new constituencies were considerably smaller than before. The restored Yale riding included the Boundary Country around Grand Forks and Greenwood, but the Kootenay was now a separate riding and the town of Yale itself was not in the restored Yale riding, but in the new riding of Westminster District. The first election using the new boundaries was in 1917, although the seat was won by acclamation by the Hon. Martin Burrell, who had been the member for Yale—Cariboo.

It was reconstituted as Yale in 1914 and lasted until 1952. This version of the riding comprised the provincial electoral district of Okanagan, excepting the parts of the city and district municipality of Salmon Arm contained in the provincial riding, and the provincial electoral districts of Similkameen, Greenwood and Grand Forks. Yale therefore contained the entire Okanagan, Boundary and Similkameen country, and the Fraser Canyon immediately around the town of Yale itself. The main difference from the earlier version of the riding is the absence of the Kootenays.

A redistribution in 1933 rearranged the riding's boundaries, once again including the original core area around Yale and Hope, though the bulk of the riding's population remained in the orchard towns of the Okanagan.

The district was recreated in 1914 for use in the Canadian federal election of 1917. It was again abolished in 1952, being redistricted into Okanagan Boundary and Okanagan—Revelstoke.

Yale riding was abolished in 1952. Its successor ridings were Okanagan Boundary and Okanagan—Revelstoke. Areas of the original core area around Yale are now part of Chilliwack—Fraser Canyon, which extends up the Fraser River to Lillooet.

== Members of Parliament ==
Parliament	Years	Member	Party
Riding created from Yale District
2nd	1872–1874	Edgar Dewdney	Conservative
3rd	1874–1878	Edgar Dewdney	Conservative
4th	1878–1879	Edgar Dewdney	Conservative
4th	1879–1882	Francis Jones Barnard	Conservative
5th	1882–1887	Francis Jones Barnard	Conservative
6th	1887–1891	John Andrew Mara	Conservative
7th	1891–1896	John Andrew Mara	Conservative
Riding dissolved into Yale—Cariboo
Riding re-created from Yale—Cariboo
13th	1917–1920	Martin Burrell	Government (Unionist)
13th	1920–1921	John Armstrong MacKelvie	Conservative
14th	1921–1924†	John Armstrong MacKelvie	Conservative
14th	1924–1925	Grote Stirling	Conservative
15th	1925–1926	Grote Stirling	Conservative
16th	1926–1930	Grote Stirling	Conservative
17th	1930–1935	Grote Stirling	Conservative
18th	1935–1940	Grote Stirling	Conservative
19th	1940–1945	Grote Stirling	Conservative
20th	1945–1947	Grote Stirling	Conservative
20th	1948–1949	Owen Jones	Co-operative Commonwealth
21st	1949–1953	Owen Jones	Co-operative Commonwealth
Riding dissolved into Okanagan Boundary and Okanagan—Revelstoke

== Election results ==
=== Yale, 1917–1953 ===
1949 Canadian federal election
Party	Candidate	Votes	%	±%
Co-operative Commonwealth	Owen Jones	13,298	42.43	–2.94
Progressive Conservative	Theodore Robert Bruce Adams	11,562	36.89	+8.78
Liberal	Charles James McDowell	5,576	17.79	–8.72
Social Credit	James Allan Reid	902	2.88	–
Total valid votes		31,338	99.42	
Total rejected ballots		184	0.58	+0.58
Turnout		31,522	75.35	–
Eligible voters		41,835		
Co-operative Commonwealth hold		Swing		–5.86
Source: Library of Parliament

Canadian federal by-election, 31 May 1948 On the resignation of Grote Stirling, 21 October 1947
Party	Candidate	Votes	%	±%
Co-operative Commonwealth	Owen Jones	12,838	45.38	+13.96
Progressive Conservative	W. A. C. Bennett	7,953	28.11	–11.10
Liberal	Edward John Chambers	7,500	26.51	+7.34
Total valid votes		28,291	100.00	
Total rejected ballots		–		
Turnout		28,291	–	
Eligible voters				
Co-operative Commonwealth gain from Progressive Conservative		Swing		+12.53
Source: Library of Parliament

1945 Canadian federal election
Party	Candidate	Votes	%	±%
Progressive Conservative	Grote Stirling	9,625	39.21	+1.55
Co-operative Commonwealth	Owen Jones	7,713	31.42	–1.11
Liberal	Arthur Wilfred Gray	4,705	19.17	–10.64
Social Credit	James Allan Reid	1,685	6.86	–
Labor–Progressive	Allan Conway Clapp	820	3.34	–
Total valid votes		24,548	99.00	
Total rejected ballots		247	1.00	–0.16
Turnout		24,795	84.66	+2.83
Eligible voters		29,287		
Progressive Conservative gain from National Government		Swing		+1.33
Source: Library of Parliament

1940 Canadian federal election
Party	Candidate	Votes	%	±%
National Government	Grote Stirling	8,599	37.66	–3.61
Co-operative Commonwealth	Owen Jones	7,428	32.53	+4.88
Liberal	Charles William Morrow	6,805	29.80	–1.27
Total valid votes		22,832	98.84	
Total rejected ballots		268	1.16	+0.05
Turnout		23,100	81.84	+5.26
Eligible voters		28,227		
National Government gain from Conservative		Swing		–4.24
Source: Library of Parliament

1935 Canadian federal election
Party	Candidate	Votes	%	±%
Conservative	Grote Stirling	6,791	41.27	–21.98
Liberal	Charles Edward Oliver	5,113	31.07	–5.68
Co-operative Commonwealth	Edward Woodford Mackay	4,551	27.66	–
Total valid votes		16,455	98.89	
Total rejected ballots		185	1.11	+1.11
Turnout		16,640	76.58	+2.40
Eligible voters		21,729		
Conservative hold		Swing		–13.83
Source: Library of Parliament

1930 Canadian federal election
Party	Candidate	Votes	%	±%
Conservative	Grote Stirling	8,447	63.25	–3.30
Liberal	Walter Gordon Wilkins	4,908	36.75	+3.30
Total valid votes		13,355	100.00	
Total rejected ballots		–		
Turnout		13,355	74.18	+3.63
Eligible voters		18,004		
Conservative hold		Swing		–3.30
Source: Library of Parliament

1926 Canadian federal election
Party	Candidate	Votes	%	±%
Conservative	Grote Stirling	7,815	66.55	+5.69
Liberal	Fremont Blakeslee Cossitt	3,928	33.45	–5.69
Total valid votes		11,743	100.00	
Total rejected ballots		–		
Turnout		11,743	70.55	–3.72
Eligible voters		16,646		
Conservative hold		Swing		+5.69
Source: Library of Parliament

1925 Canadian federal election
Party	Candidate	Votes	%	±%
Conservative	Grote Stirling	7,573	60.86	+9.38
Liberal	Charles Edgar Edgett	4,870	39.14	–9.38
Total valid votes		12,443	100.00	
Total rejected ballots		–		
Turnout		12,443	74.26	–
Eligible voters		16,755		
Conservative hold		Swing		+9.38
Source: Library of Parliament

Canadian federal by-election, 6 November 1924 On the death of John Armstrong MacKelvie, 6 April 1924
Party	Candidate	Votes	%	±%
Conservative	Grote Stirling	6,354	51.48	–0.70
Liberal	Daniel Wilbur Sutherland	5,988	48.52	+0.70
Total valid votes		12,342	100.00	
Total rejected ballots		–		
Turnout		12,342		
Eligible voters				
Conservative hold		Swing		–0.70
Source: Library of Parliament

1921 Canadian federal election
Party	Candidate	Votes	%	±%
Conservative	John Armstrong MacKelvie	6,475	52.18	+0.16
Liberal	Daniel Wilbur Sutherland	5,933	47.82	–
Total valid votes		12,408	100.00	
Total rejected ballots		–		
Turnout		12,408	76.46	–
Eligible voters		16,228		
Conservative hold		Swing		–23.84
Source: Library of Parliament

Canadian federal by-election, 22 November 1920 On Martin Burrell being appointed joint Librarian of Parliament
Party	Candidate	Votes	%	±%
Conservative	John Armstrong MacKelvie	4,989	52.03	–
United Farmers	Charles Edgar Edgett	4,600	47.97	–
Total valid votes		9,589	100.00	
Total rejected ballots		–		
Turnout		9,589	–	
Eligible voters				
Conservative hold		Swing		–
Source: Library of Parliament

1917 Canadian federal election
Party	Candidate	Votes
Government (Unionist)	Martin Burrell	acclaimed
This riding was created from parts of Yale—Cariboo, where Conservative Martin Burrell was the incumbent.
Source: Library of Parliament

=== Yale, 1872–1892 ===
1891 Canadian federal election
Party	Candidate	Votes
Conservative	John Andrew Mara	acclaimed
Source: Library of Parliament

1887 Canadian federal election
Party	Candidate	Votes
Conservative	John Andrew Mara	acclaimed
Source: Library of Parliament

1882 Canadian federal election
Party	Candidate	Votes	%	±%
Conservative	Francis Jones Barnard	266	58.72	–9.45
Liberal	James Alexander Robinson	109	24.06	–
Conservative	Forbes George Vernon	78	17.22	–
Total valid votes		453	100.00	
Total rejected ballots		–		
Turnout		453	89.00	–
Eligible voters		509		
Conservative hold		Swing		–16.76
Source: Library of Parliament

Canadian federal by-election, 29 September 1879 On the appointment of Edgar Dewdney to the position of Indian Commissioner of Manitoba and the North West Territories, 30 May 1879
Party	Candidate	Votes	%	±%
Conservative	Francis Jones Barnard	212	68.17	–
Unknown	Thomas John Trapp	99	31.83	–
Total valid votes		311	100.00	
Total rejected ballots		–		
Turnout		311	–	
Eligible voters				
Conservative hold		Swing		–
Source: Library of Parliament

1878 Canadian federal election
Party	Candidate	Votes
Conservative	Edgar Dewdney	acclaimed
Source: Library of Parliament

1874 Canadian federal election
Party	Candidate	Votes	%	±%
Conservative	Edgar Dewdney	89	81.65	+12.30
Unknown	D. Chisholm	20	18.35	–
Total valid votes		109	100.00	
Total rejected ballots		–		
Turnout		109	57.67	
Eligible voters		189		
Conservative hold		Swing		–3.02
Source: Library of Parliament

1872 Canadian federal election
Party	Candidate	Votes	%
Conservative	Edgar Dewdney	43	69.35
Unknown	Robert Smith	19	30.65
Total valid votes		62	100.00
Total rejected ballots		–	
Turnout		62	41.89
Eligible voters		148	
This district was created from Yale District, which elected a Liberal in the previous election.
Source: Library of Parliament

== See also ==
- List of Canadian electoral districts
- Historical federal electoral districts of Canada
