= SS Yale =

SS Yale may refer to various American steamships, including:

- SS Yale (1906)
- SS Yale (1924)
- SS Yale Victory

== See also ==
- USS Yale
