= Irvine Finlay Corbett =

Canadian politician (1915–1986)

MLA for Yale
- In office 1952–1963

Personal details
- Born: February 12, 1915 Cranbrook, British Columbia
- Died: October 7, 1986 (aged 71) near Yale, British Columbia
- Party: British Columbia Social Credit Party

Irvine Finlay Corbett (February 12, 1915 – October 7, 1986) was a Canadian politician. He served in the Legislative Assembly of British Columbia from 1952 to 1963, as a Social Credit member for the constituency of Yale. He was defeated in the 1963, 1966 and 1969 provincial elections. He and his wife died in 1986 in a plane crash near Yale, British Columbia.
