= Yale—Cariboo =

Former federal electoral district in British Columbia, Canada

British Columbia electoral district

Defunct federal electoral district
- Legislature: House of Commons
- District created: 1896
- District abolished: 1917
- First contested: 1896
- Last contested: 1911

Yale–Cariboo was a federal electoral district in British Columbia, Canada, that was represented in the House of Commons of Canada from 1896 to 1917.

This riding was created in 1896 by combining the former Yale and Cariboo ridings. A redistribution in 1903 split off the eastern portion of the riding as the Kootenay riding from the Yale portion of Yale–Cariboo. It was abolished in 1914 and the Yale riding name restored, although on a smaller scale and actually without the town of Yale in the riding (it was in Fraser Valley), and also excluding Salmon Arm and Kamloops, which were part of the Cariboo portion of Yale–Cariboo, were reassigned to the Cariboo riding.

== Major communities in the riding ==
Thompson:

- Savona
- Kamloops

Shuswap:

- Salmon Arm
- Falkland

Okanagan:

- Vernon
- Kelowna
- Penticton
- Osoyoos
- Oliver
- Enderby
- Armstrong
- Summerland
- Coldstream
- Cherryville

Boundary Country:

- Greenwood
- Grand Forks
- Rock Creek
- Eholt (Midway)

The following communities were split off from Yale–Cariboo in the redistribution of 1903, to form the new riding of Kootenay.

- Castlegar
- Rossland
- Trail
- Ymir
- Nelson
- Sandon
- New Denver
- Kaslo
- Nakusp
- Revelstoke
- Golden
- Invermere
- Kimberley
- Cranbrook
- Fernie
- Sparwood
- Yahk
- Creston
- Salmo

Nicola-Similkameen:

- Keremeos
- Hedley
- Princeton
- Merritt
- Douglas Lake
- Tulameen
- Coalmont (Granite City)
- Aspen Grove

== Members of Parliament ==
This riding elected the following members of Parliament:

| Parliament | Years | Member | Party |
|---|---|---|---|
Riding created from Yale and Cariboo
| 8th | 1896–1900 | Hewitt Bostock | Liberal |
| 9th | 1900–1904 | William Alfred Galliher | Liberal |
| 10th | 1904–1908 | Duncan Ross | Liberal |
| 11th | 1908–1911 | Martin Burrell | Conservative |
| 12th | 1911–1911 | Martin Burrell | Conservative |
| 12th | 1911–1917 | Martin Burrell | Conservative |
Riding dissolved into Cariboo and Yale

== Election results ==
Canadian federal by-election, 4 November 1911 On Martin Burrell being appointed Minister of Agriculture, 10 October 1911
| Party | Candidate | Votes |
|---|---|---|
| Conservative | Martin Burrell | acclaimed |
Source: Library of Parliament

1911 Canadian federal election
| Party | Candidate | Votes | % | ±% |
|---|---|---|---|---|
| Conservative | Martin Burrell | 3,851 | 63.56 | +10.42 |
| Liberal | K. C. MacDonald | 1,962 | 32.38 | –6.85 |
| Socialist | James Foulds Johnson | 246 | 4.06 | – |
| Total valid votes | | 6,059 | 100.00 | |
| Total rejected ballots | | – | | |
| Turnout | | 6,059 | 55.52 | +0.52 |
| Eligible voters | | 10,914 | | |
| Conservative hold | | Swing | | +8.64 |
Source: Library of Parliament

1908 Canadian federal election
| Party | Candidate | Votes | % | ±% |
|---|---|---|---|---|
| Conservative | Martin Burrell | 3,413 | 53.14 | +10.48 |
| Liberal | Duncan Ross | 2,520 | 39.23 | –7.12 |
| Unknown | Charles Bunting | 490 | 7.63 | – |
| Total valid votes | | 6,423 | 100.00 | |
| Total rejected ballots | | – | | |
| Turnout | | 6,423 | 54.99 | –8.08 |
| Eligible voters | | 11,680 | | |
| Conservative gain from Liberal | | Swing | | +8.80 |
Source: Library of Parliament

1904 Canadian federal election
| Party | Candidate | Votes | % | ±% |
|---|---|---|---|---|
| Liberal | Duncan Ross | 2,019 | 46.35 | +9.07 |
| Conservative | Martin Burrell | 1,858 | 42.65 | +11.71 |
| Unknown | Ernest Mills | 479 | 11.00 | – |
| Total valid votes | | 4,356 | 100.00 | |
| Total rejected ballots | | – | | |
| Turnout | | 4,356 | 63.08 | –17.34 |
| Eligible voters | | 6,906 | | |
| Liberal hold | | Swing | | –1.32 |
Source: Library of Parliament

1900 Canadian federal election
| Party | Candidate | Votes | % | ±% |
|---|---|---|---|---|
| Liberal | William Alfred Galliher | 3,112 | 37.28 | –17.94 |
| Labour | Chris Foley | 2,652 | 31.77 | – |
| Conservative | John McKane | 2,583 | 30.95 | –13.83 |
| Total valid votes | | 8,347 | 100.00 | |
| Total rejected ballots | | – | | |
| Turnout | | 8,347 | 80.41 | +37.76 |
| Eligible voters | | 10,380 | | |
| Liberal hold | | Swing | | –24.86 |
Source: Library of Parliament

1896 Canadian federal election
| Party | Candidate | Votes | % |
|---|---|---|---|
| Liberal | Hewitt Bostock | 1,824 | 55.22 |
| Conservative | John Andrew Mara | 1,479 | 44.78 |
| Total valid votes | | 3,303 | 100.00 |
| Total rejected ballots | | – | |
| Turnout | | 3,303 | 42.66 |
| Eligible voters | | 7,743 | |
This riding was created from Yale and Cariboo, which both elected Conservatives in the previous election. John Andrew Mara was the incumbent from Yale.
Source: Library of Parliament

== See also ==
- List of Canadian electoral districts
- Historical federal electoral districts of Canada
