= Bruce Howard (politician) =

Canadian politician

Bruce Andrew Thomas Howard

Member of Parliament for Okanagan Boundary
- In office June 1968 – September 1972

Personal details
- Born: 5 December 1922 Drayton, Ontario, Canada
- Died: 11 September 2002 (aged 79)
- Party: Liberal
- Profession: realtor

Bruce Andrew Thomas Howard (5 December 1922 – 11 September 2002) was a member of the Liberal party in the House of Commons of Canada. Born in Drayton, Ontario, he pursued a career as a realtor.

Howard represented the Okanagan Boundary riding in British Columbia. After an unsuccessful bid in the 1965 federal election, he successfully won the seat in the 1968 election. Howard served his only term in the 28th Canadian Parliament, but was defeated in the 1972 election by George Whittaker of the Progressive Conservative party.

From October 1970 to September 1972, Howard was Parliamentary Secretary to Jean-Luc Pépin, the Minister of Industry, Trade and Commerce of that time.
