= Donald Graham (politician) =

Canadian politician (1848–1944)

Member of the Legislative Assembly of British Columbia for Yale-East
- In office 1894–1898
- Preceded by: Constituency established
- Succeeded by: Price Ellison

Personal details
- Born: April 28, 1848 Ardallin, Sutherlandshire, Scotland
- Died: 1944 (aged 95–96) Canada
- Spouse: Adelaide Grier (m. 1885)
- Occupation: Farmer; politician

Donald Graham (April 23, 1848 – 1944) was a Scottish-born farmer and political figure in British Columbia. He represented Yale-East in the Legislative Assembly of British Columbia from 1894 to 1898.

== Early life ==
He was born on April 23, 1848 in Ardallin, Sutherlandshire, the son of Alexander Graham, and was educated in Tain, Ross-shire. Graham came to Canada in 1865. In 1875, he moved to British Columbia, settling in the Okanagan Valley.

== Career ==
For a time, Graham drove a pack-train for a government survey party. Graham served as a justice of the peace and was reeve of Spallumcheen for three terms. He was defeated when he ran for reelection in 1898. Graham was one of the promoters of the Okanagan Flour Mills Co. Ltd, a co-operative flour milling company formed in 1895.

== Personal life and death ==
In 1885, he married Adelaide Grier.

He died in 1944.
