= Kootenay (federal electoral district) =

Former federal electoral district in British Columbia, Canada

British Columbia electoral district

Defunct federal electoral district
- Legislature: House of Commons
- District created: 1903
- District abolished: 1914
- First contested: 1904
- Last contested: 1912

Kootenay was a federal electoral district in British Columbia, Canada that was represented in the House of Commons of Canada from 1904 to 1917. This riding was created in 1903 from the eastern part of Yale—Cariboo riding, namely areas part of the Kootenay Land District, whose boundaries formed the federal electoral district boundary, and also defined the Kootenay provincial riding's boundaries.

The federal Kootenay riding was abolished in 1914 when it was redistributed into Kootenay East and Kootenay West ridings.

== Members of Parliament ==
Parliament	Years	Member	Party
Riding created from Yale—Cariboo
10th	1904–1908	William Alfred Galliher	Liberal
11th	1908–1911	Arthur Samuel Goodeve	Conservative
12th	1911–1912	Arthur Samuel Goodeve	Conservative
12th	1912–1917	Robert Francis Green	Conservative
Riding dissolved into Kootenay East and Kootenay West

== Election results ==
=== 1912 ===
Canadian federal by-election, 30 May 1912 On the appointment of Arthur Goodeve to Railway Commissioner for Canada, 4 May 1912
Party	Candidate	Votes
Conservative	Robert Francis Green	acclaimed
Source: Library of Parliament

=== 1911 ===
1911 Canadian federal election
Party	Candidate	Votes	%	±%
Conservative	Arthur Samuel Goodeve	4,113	57.51	+10.54
Liberal	James Horace King	3,039	42.49	+9.66
Total valid votes		7,152	100.00	
Total rejected ballots		–		
Turnout		7,152	59.31	+6.78
Eligible voters		12,059		
Conservative hold		Swing		+0.44
Source: Library of Parliament

=== 1908 ===
1908 Canadian federal election
Party	Candidate	Votes	%	±%
Conservative	Arthur Samuel Goodeve	3,109	46.97	+10.98
Liberal	Smith Curtis	2,173	32.83	–18.63
Socialist	William Davidson	1,337	20.20	–
Total valid votes		6,619	100.00	
Total rejected ballots		–		
Turnout		6,619	52.53	–7.91
Eligible voters		12,600		
Conservative gain from Liberal		Swing		+14.81
Source: Library of Parliament

=== 1904 ===
1904 Canadian federal election
Party	Candidate	Votes	%	±%
Liberal	William Alfred Galliher	2,551	51.46	–
Conservative	Charles Herbert Mackintosh	1,784	35.99	–
Unknown	James A. Baker	622	12.55	–
Total valid votes		4,957	100.00	
Total rejected ballots		–		
Turnout		4,957	60.44	–
Eligible voters		8,201		
Liberal notional hold		Swing		–
This riding was created from Yale—Cariboo, where Liberal William Alfred Galliher was the incumbent.
Source: Library of Parliament

== See also ==
- List of Canadian electoral districts
- Historical federal electoral districts of Canada
- List of electoral districts in the Kootenays
