= Robert Smith (British Columbia politician) =

Canadian politician

Robert Smith was an Irish-born Member of the Legislative Assembly of the province of British Columbia, Canada from its entry into Confederation in 1871 until his retirement at the provincial election of 1878. Smith represented the Fraser Canyon-Interior riding of Yale. The Yale riding in this period included the Okanagan, Similkameen, Nicola and Shuswap areas. After stepping down at the 1878 provincial election, he never sought provincial office again.

He represented Yale and Lytton in the Legislative Council of British Columbia before 1871. Smith was an unsuccessful candidate for the Yale seat in the Canadian House of Commons in 1872. Smith introduced a motion in the assembly that, if the railway to the Pacific was not started by January 1876, that British Columbia be allowed to withdraw from Confederation and be awarded 30 million dollars in compensation from Canada.
