= Frank Barnard =

Frank Barnard may refer to:

- Francis Jones Barnard (1829–1889), Canadian businessman and Member of Parliament
- Francis Stillman Barnard (1856–1936), Canadian parliamentarian and Lieutenant Governor of British Columbia
- Frank Barnard (author) (born 1938), British novelist and journalist
