= Parsonville, British Columbia =

Ghost town in British Columbia, Canada

Parsonville is a ghost town on the east shore of the Fraser River approximately opposite Lillooet. On BC Highway 99, the locality is by road about 100 kilometres (62 mi) northeast of Pemberton, 64 kilometres (40 mi) northwest of Lytton, and 172 kilometres (107 mi) west of Kamloops.

== Name origin ==
From about 1859, Otis Parsons, who supervised the team that built the section of the Douglas Road to the head of Anderson Lake, operated the Parsonville ferry until his death. Presumably, he employed others to run the day-to-day affairs. From 1871, he was captaining Fraser River steamboats and drowned in 1875.

== Goldrush settlement ==
About opposite the Seton River mouth, this prospectors' shanty town sprang up on the east bank of the Fraser during the Fraser Canyon Gold Rush (upper canyon) but rapidly emptied during the Cariboo Gold Rush. Although impossible to precisely place any of the settlements, Marysville was believed to be adjacent to the north and Fort Berens to the south. At the time, Parsonville was a fair-sized settlement on the flats.

Jewish merchant Felix Neufelder owned a branch store. Crawford and Matheson built and ran the Parsonville House (1862) catering to travellers, one of the more substantial buildings. However, none of the early residents had legal tenure. In 1863, Alexander Kennedy preempted this acreage.

== Early roads ==
In June 1862, the Royal Engineers roadbuilding crew, under Sgt. Major John McMurphy, camped at Parsonville. From "Mile 0", the Old Cariboo Road had advanced about 339 kilometres (211 mi) northward to Alexandria by August 1863. In 1862, a tollbooth existed at Parsonville, and Otis Parsons and his partner named Nelson were running a successful freight business. However, traffic diminished when the new Cariboo Road via Ashcroft, bypassed Lillooet in 1864. Parsonville quickly faded and Lillooet became "Mile 0". What had been the leading town in 1858 was merely a gold prospecting site by the 1880s.

== Jonathan Hoiten Scott ==
J.H. Scott had grown several crops of the finest leaf tobacco prior to buying 68 hectares (168 acres) from Kennedy, who had pre-empted the property months earlier. In 1938, George Matheson Murray unveiled a monument at the western end of the Parsonville plain. The bronze plaque attached to the 7-ton granite boulder noted that Scott grew and processed the first tobacco on the BC mainland 1858–1864.

In summer 1865, Scott purchased the machinery from the steamer Champion, which had worked on Seton Lake, to build a steam-powered flour mill. The mill, which was operating by September 1866, relocated to Clinton in 1868.

== Railway ==
In early 1915, the Pacific Great Eastern Railway (PGE) built a rail bridge across the Fraser. PGE established a divisional point and erected a station and four-stall roundhouse at East Lillooet (former Parsonville vicinity). The 1931 route realignment completely bypassed this locality.
