= Lillooet ferries and bridges (Fraser River) =

A series of ferries and bridges have crossed the Fraser River in the vicinity of Lillooet in the Squamish-Lillooet region of southwestern British Columbia. From the 1850s, these crossings have connected both north–south and local traffic.

== Ferry era ==
At least from mid-1859, a ferry operated about 4 kilometres (2 mi) to the north.

From about 1859, Otis Parsons, who supervised the team that built the section of the Douglas Road to the head of Anderson Lake, operated the Parsonville ferry until his death. About opposite the Seton River mouth, this prospectors' shanty town sprang up on the east bank of the Fraser. A mid-1862 account is possibly this ferry, which could carry about 12 passengers with luggage. The boat was hauled a considerable distance upstream before launching. Keeping the craft pointing toward the opposite bank, a crew of six rowed strenuously. Carried by the swift current, the occupants reached the far bank hundreds of yards downstream. A similar 1862 account describes tying their mule to the rowboat stern and their landing half a mile downstream. The fare was 25 cents per passenger and $1 for towing the mule.

In 1861, John Mueller (later known as Miller) established a scow ferry near the site of the present suspension bridge. This reaction ferry was assisted by being pulled by hand with a rope, and a cable was anchored at each bank. In 1873, he leased the business to Thomas G. Marshall. In 1878, James Halladay was awarded the five-year charter for the toll ferry. He paid an annual $140 fee, while the scow and equipment remained government property. In 1883, 1888, and 1891, Miller was awarded the charter.

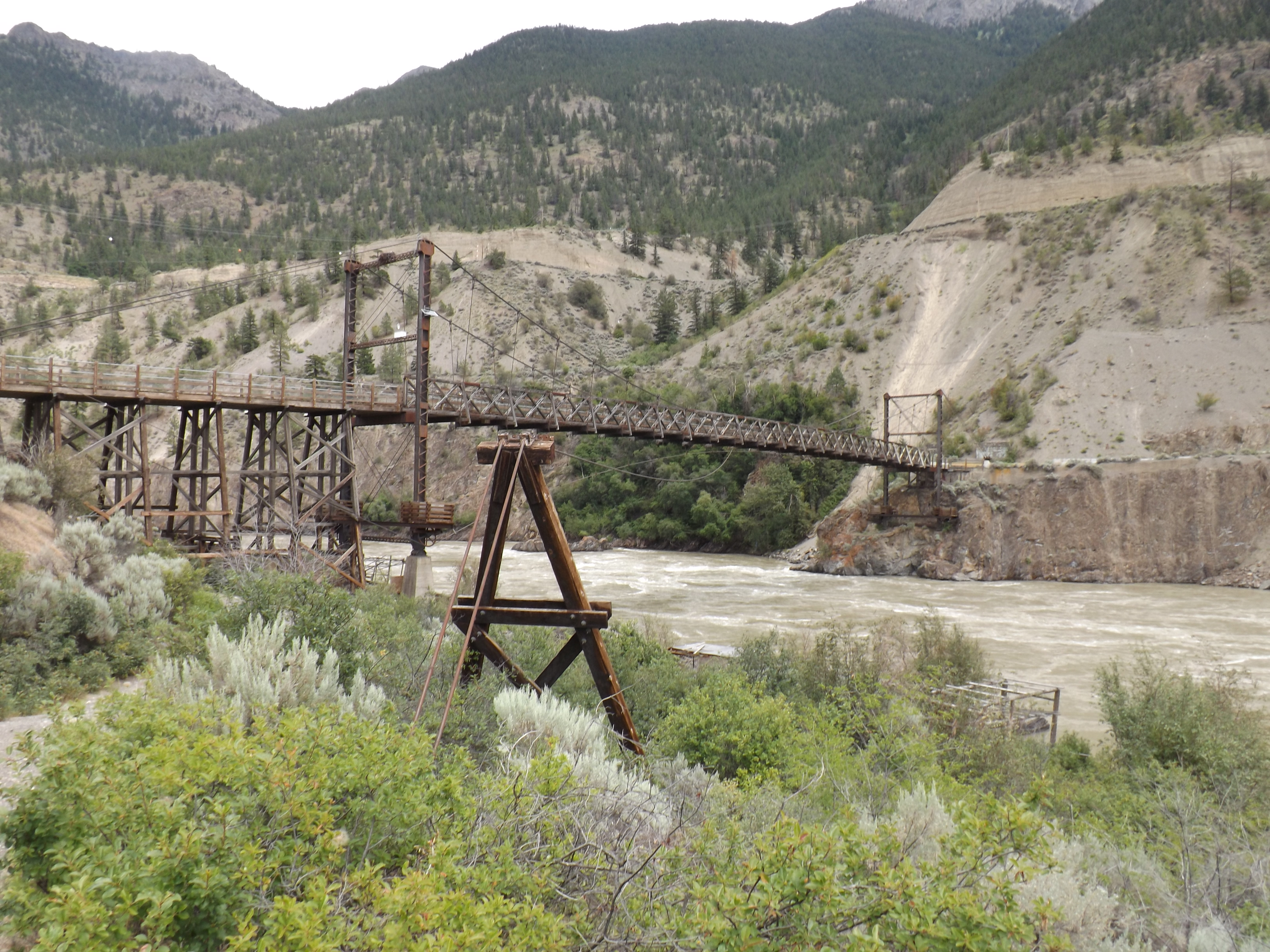
Lillooet Suspension Bridge, 2013

== Road bridges ==
In February 1889, the San Francisco Bridge Co completed the 141-metre (464 ft) braced arch truss bridge, which comprised a 103-metre (339 ft) span, 38-metre (125 ft) trestle approach, and 5-metre (18 ft) roadway width. In 1910, this bridge was blown up during the final stages of the replacement project, and a temporary ferry installed.

In early 1911, the Lillooet Suspension Bridge (a.k.a. the Lillooet Old Bridge) opened, and the construction equipment was moved to Chimney Creek to erect a similar bridge. The total length is 161 metres (528 ft), of which the main span between the towers is 105 metres (345 ft). During the final years of highway use, maintenance was high, heavy loads were at times restricted, and serious deterioration was evident. Completed in 2003, a restoration project has ensured a safe pedestrian-only crossing and included the installation of bat houses under the bridge deck.

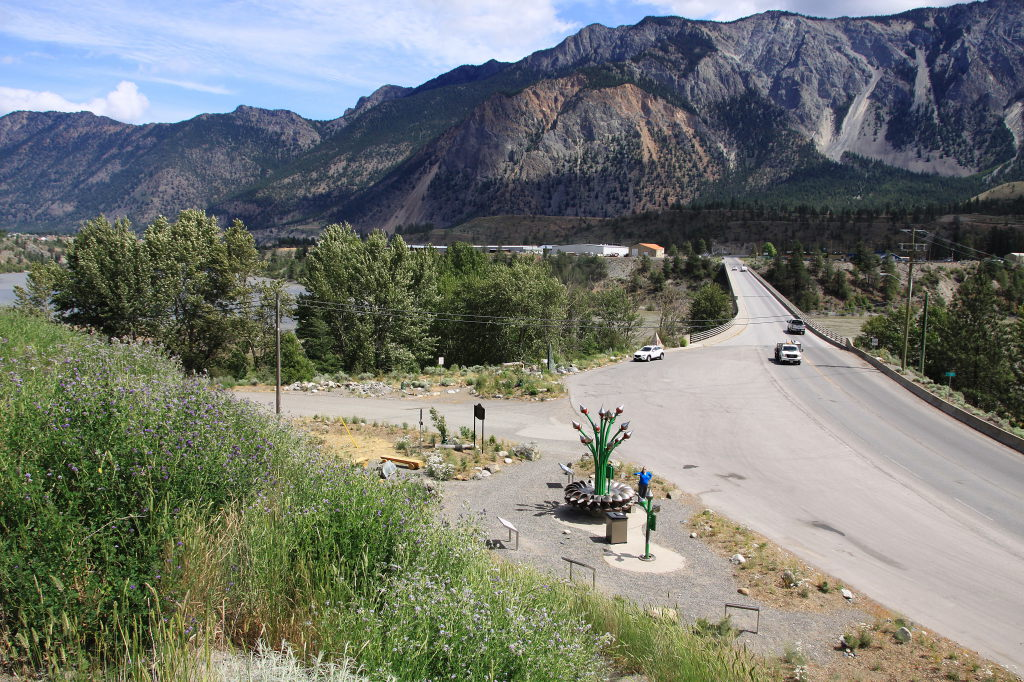
Bridge of the Twenty-Three Camels

In 1862, a syndicate brought the Cariboo camels to BC for use as pack animals, but the creatures proved unsuited for this task and the venture failed. As a memorial, the Bridge of the Twenty-Three Camels was officially chosen as the name for this replacement structure. Construction took about 18 months. Transportation Minister Alex. V. Fraser and Minister of Forests and local MLA Thomas Waterland conducted the official opening ceremony on June 27, 1981. The bridge connects BC Highway 99 northward and southwestward, the former linking with BC Highway 12 southeastward.

In jest, the small bridge over the Yalakom River at Moha is dubbed the Bridge of the Twenty-Three Chipmunks.

== Railway bridges ==
In 1915, immediately south of the Seton River mouth, the Pacific Great Eastern Railway (PGE) built a 212-metre (695 ft) wooden trestle approach on the southwest, six Howe trusses in the centre, and a 340-metre (1,110 ft) trestle approach on the northeast. In 1931, the replacement 180-metre (600 ft) steel truss bridge, with steel approaches, opened at Polley to the north. In 1968, a fire extensively damaged the bridge, which required replacement of the decking and 10 sets of plate girder stringers.

== See also ==
- List of crossings of the Fraser River
- List of Inland Ferries in British Columbia
- List of bridges in British Columbia
