= Leboe =

Leboe can refer to:

== People ==
- Bert Leboe (1909–1980), Canadian politician in BC
- Justin Leboe, Canadian chef and businessman
