= Stephen Tingley =

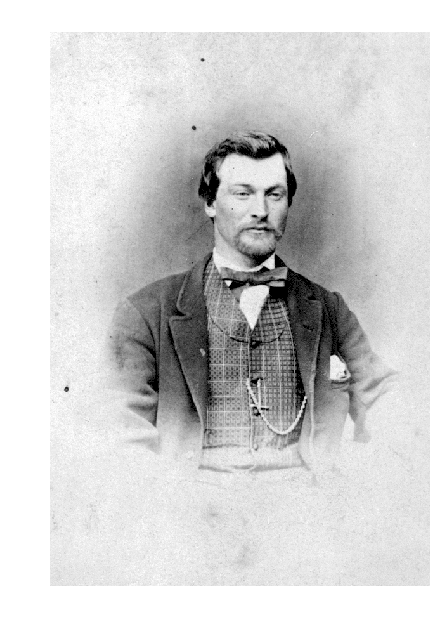
- Stephen Tingley
- Born: September 13, 1839; Point de Bute, New Brunswick
- Died: October 9, 1915; Vancouver, British Columbia
- Occupation(s): stagecoach driver, entrepreneur
- Spouse(s): (1) Elizabeth Harper (1839-1873); (2) Pauline Laumeister (md. 1877)
- Children: Clarence Harper Tingley, Fredeick Chipman Harper Tingley
- Parent(s): Caleb Tingley, Deborah ?

Stephen Tingley (September 13, 1839 – October 9, 1915) was a stagecoach driver and one of the original owners of the pioneer transportation company BC Express that served the Cariboo region in British Columbia, Canada for 60 years, from 1860, when it was first founded as Barnard's Express, until 1920, when it ceased its sternwheeler service.

For twenty years Stephen Tingley drove the BC Express stagecoaches between Yale and Cache Creek, over what was then one of the most hazardous roads in North America.

Tingley Creek, which flows north-east into the Fraser River near Marguerite is named for him.

== Career ==
Born in Point de Bute near Sackville, New Brunswick, Stephen Tingley came to British Columbia in 1861 and tried his luck at mining during the Cariboo Gold Rush before returning to Yale in 1864 and starting a harness shop, having apprenticed as a saddler in New Brunswick. In 1864, he hired on as a driver for Francis Jones Barnard. In 1868, he travelled to California and Mexico where he obtained 500 unbroken horses for Barnard. His notebooks provide details on the harrowing drive northward to Vernon. This exploit left him secure enough financially that in 1869 he returned to New Brunswick where he married Elizabeth Harper, with whom he returned to BC.

The British Columbia Express Company was incorporated in 1871 with original owner, Francis Jones Barnard, holding one half interest, and Stephen Tingley and James Hamilton each holding one quarter interest. In 1886, Hamilton died and Barnard sold out to Tingley who thus became sole owner. Tingley ran the company for ten years before selling out to Charles Vance Millar.

In 1894 Tingley bought the Hat Creek Ranch where he built the BX Barn and a large stables for the draft horses that were used to pull the stagecoaches along the Cariboo Road.

In 1896, Tingley partnered with Captain John Irving of Victoria and Senator James Reid of Quesnel and formed the North British Columbia Navigation Company. The partners hired Alexander Watson to build a sternwheeler to work on the upper Fraser River, the Charlotte. The Charlotte ran from Soda Creek to Quesnel and was the only sternwheeler on the upper Fraser until 1909.

== Personal life ==
He was married twice. His first wife Elizabeth Harper had two sons and died in 1873 when the rig he was driving fell into the Fraser Canyon near Yale. He returned to New Brunswick with her body, a trip lasting more than a month, to have it interred. He later married Pauline Laumeister, daughter of Frank Laumeister, who had introduced camels to the region. Tingley died on October 9, 1915, and was buried at the Mountain View Cemetery in Vancouver.
