= Margaret "Ma" Murray =

Canadian journalist and newspaper editor

Ma Murray, OC (née Margaret Theresa Lally; 1888 – September 25, 1982, age 94) was an American-Canadian newspaper editor, publisher, and columnist, an officer of the Order of Canada, and the wife of publisher and British Columbia MLA George Murray. The Murrays' publications were The Chinook (Vancouver, British Columbia) the Bridge River-Lillooet News (Lillooet, British Columbia) and the Alaska Highway News (Fort St. John, British Columbia).

She was co-founder and editor (with her husband George) of the Bridge River-Lillooet News, the Alaska Highway News and other publications. Her editorials were famously signed off with the catchphrase "And that's fer damshur!"

== Early years ==
Born Margaret Theresa Lally in Kansas City, Missouri to Irish immigrants, Margaret was raised on rural Kansas farmland in the United States, largely in poverty. She was the seventh of nine children. She left school at 13. At 17, she spent a year in Fremont, Nebraska, studying to be a typist, bookkeeper, filing clerk, shorthand writer, and business administrator. She worked for a period in the shipping department at the Shipley Saddlery Company in Kansas City.

She came to Vancouver, British Columbia en route to Calgary, Alberta, where she hoped to find herself a cowboy to wed (she and her sister, Bess, had corresponded with cowboys who had written in response to the notes they had tucked into the most expensive saddles being shipped north).

== "Ye Ed" and her publisher-husband ==
She arrived in Vancouver in 1912 and found work as a secretary and bookkeeper for The Chinook, which was published by George Murray. She married him the following year. This was in spite of their religious differences (she was an ardent Catholic - and madly in love with George - her entire life). She won continent-wide fame for some of her columns - either because she had a point, or because they were downright funny, and often coarse - or at least matter-of-fact. The Murrays also launched various lesser known publications including Country Life In British Columbia, a popular magazine for rural women, and The Chinook, which was George's first venture upon his coming to BC from Ottawa, where he had worked as junior columnist for the Ottawa Citizen and apprenticed in politics under Sir Wilfrid Laurier.

== Politics ==
Both had a high profile in provincial politics. George, already a bright, articulate and somewhat visionary star in the BC Liberal Party, was a popular MLA from his arrival in Lillooet until his electoral demise in 1941. Both Murrays had taken a strong stand in print in favour of the miners striking in the Bridge River, and alienated not only prime advertisers but also some of George's political backers; and by the time of the election most of the striking men had gone away to war; merchants without them as customers were also unwilling to support the Murrays. George was squeezed out of office in 1945 in a narrow race with his old rival Ernest Crawford Carson. Faced with a disappeared revenue stream for their paper and George without a seat in the House, they took the decision to move to Alaska.

== North to the Alaska Highway ==
Both she and George were vocal proponents of the Alaska Highway and excitedly moved to the instant city of Fort St. John to chronicle its birth at the launching of construction on the mammoth project and launched their Alaska Highway News upon arrival. The account of this experience in The Newspapering Murrays vividly documents the wild times and of that instant boomtown at its birth, and exposes much of the material waste that went into the U.S. military's building of the highway. She was one of the locals interviewed in the National Film Board of Canada short "People of the Peace" (1958).

== George in and out of Parliament ==
In 1949, George ran successfully for Member of Parliament for the Cariboo riding, which included Lillooet, but lost in 1953. The candidate for the rising forces of Social Credit in B.C. edged out Murray, in part thanks to the third-party split from the CCF candidate. Complicating the race was that Ma had decided to run for the legislature (in the same election, but for a different party - Social Credit, no less, and without telling him first, then switching to a fringe party, the "Common Herd" or People Party, in the riding of North Peace River). She had already had a high-profile political career as an editorialist, and was often a social embarrassment to her husband (who still loved her deeply nonetheless). Ma withdrew from the race, but the damage was done. George was shamed out of politics and, by now an outsider in revolt from the Liberal-Conservative Coalition and unwilling to join league with Bennett's Socreds, he gave up on his political career and retired from the House of Commons, returning to publishing.

George died in 1961, but Ma survived him by 21 years, and continued to run and publish the paper after his death - and to raise eyebrows with her editorials, and laughter with her speeches and frank opinions. Ma but spent her last days back at the editors' desk in historic Lillooet, British Columbia, churning out her raunchy wit and lusty language until the very last, continuing to write a column now and then even after her retirement as editor.

Ma Murray died in 1982. She was survived by her daughter, Georgina. A son, Dan, died of cancer in 1981. Both children were working journalists.

== Elementary school ==
Named in her honor, the Margaret 'Ma' Murray Community School, grades k-6, was opened in Fort St. John in 2018.

== Sources ==
- Literary and Archives Canada Website Ma Murray Profile
- North Peace Digital Community website biography
- Ma Murray Community Newspaper Awards
- Lillooet History Website
- Bridge River-Lillooet Online Archive (historic and scenic images and commentaries)
