= Fort Berens Winery =

Winery in British Columbia, Canada

Fort Berens Winery, aka Fort Berens Estate Winery, is a winery and vineyard based in Lillooet, British Columbia, Canada. Located in East Lillooet, near the site of the never-built Hudson's Bay Company's Fort Berens, it is the first successful attempt at a commercial winery in the area in the 20th Century and has won numerous awards for its wines. It is the only commercial winery so far in the newly designated Lillooet wine region, though there are established local vineyards which are non-commercial and a history of wine cultivation at nearby Fountain. It was founded by Rolf de Bruin, who immigrated to Canada with his family in 2008 from the Netherlands with his wife Heleen Pannekoek and their family. They chose Lillooet over the Okanagan because land values there were a quarter what they were in the Okanagan, which is the centre of the BC wine industry. Though the winery's first commercial vintage was made from grapes and wine brought in from the Okanagan, their first bottles made from grapes grown only in Lillooet were opened on April 30, 2012. The winery first started operations in 2009.

== Wines and grapes ==
The winery's vineyards comprise twenty acres on the east bank of the Fraser River opposite downtown Lillooet, at an elevation of 230m, which was formerly ginseng farm and, before that, alfalfa farm and prior to that, market gardens. Fort Berens wines feature images of burros, canoes railroads, and other modes of 19th century transportation, with a new "23 Camels" vintage featuring camels, evoking the story of the Cariboo Camels, and which is also seen locally in the name of the Bridge of the Twenty-Three Camels, which is the crossing of the Fraser River by BC Highway 99. Current production is shown in the following list, where cited:,

- Pinot Gris (275 cases)
- Pinot Noir Rosé (90 cases)
- White Gold Chardonnay (98 cases)
- Riesling (175 cases)
- Meritage (Merlot/Cabernet Sauvigon/Cabernet Franc)
- 23 Camels White (Pinot Gris/Chardonnay/Riesling)
- 23 Camels Red (Merlot/Cabernet Sauvignon/Cabernet Franc)

== Awards ==
- All Canadian Wine Championships, 2010, for the 2007 Meritage
- All-Canadian Wine Festival, 2013:
  - Gold medal for the 2012 Pinot Gris
  - Silver medal for the 2012 Rose
  - Bronze medal for the 2012 Riesling
  - Bronze medal for the 2011 Pinot Noir
- Los Angeles International Wine Competition, 2013
  - 2012 Riesling
- Okanagan Best Varietal Awards
  - 2011 Pinot Gris

== Other products ==
Fort Berens also sells wine-related products such as glasses and decanters and racks. It also has a small gallery featuring pottery, utensils and photography by area craftsmen and artisans. Condiments made from local fruit and produce include:

- Chardonnay jelly
- 23 Camels jelly, made from the wine of the same name
- Pumpkin chutney
- tomato salsa
