= Walter Henderson =

Walter Henderson may refer to:

- Walter Henderson (athlete) (1880–1944), British track and field athlete
- Walter Henderson (politician) (1891–1968), Canadian Member of Parliament
- Walt Henderson, character in Paris, Texas (film)
- Walt Henderson, character in Thea (TV series)
