= Alaska Highway (disambiguation) =

The Alaska Highway is a highway from British Columbia and Alaska

Other uses include:

- Alaska Highway (film)
- Alaska Passage also known as Alaska Highway
- Alaska Highway News
- Alaskan Way Viaduct in Seattle, Washington
  - Alaskan Way Viaduct replacement tunnel
- Alaska Marine Highway

== See also ==
- List of Alaska Routes
