= Frederick John Fulton =

Canadian politician (1862–1936)

Frederick John Fulton KC

Member of Parliament for Cariboo
- In office December 17, 1917 – December 5, 1921
- Preceded by: Francis Stillman Barnard (1896) (Note: Riding was dissolved and recreated from Yale—Cariboo)
- Succeeded by: Thomas George McBride

Member of the Legislative Assembly
- In office 1900–1909

Personal details
- Born: December 8, 1862 Bedlington, Northumberland, England
- Died: July 25, 1936 (aged 73)
- Party: Unionist
- Spouse: Winnifred M. Davie (m. 1906)
- Children: 4, including Davie

Frederick John Fulton KC (December 8, 1862 – July 25, 1936) was a British-born and educated Canadian lawyer and politician. He practiced law in Kamloops, British Columbia. He was a member of the British Columbia Legislative Assembly from 1900 until his retirement at the 1909 provincial election. He served in a series of cabinet roles, including as President of the Executive Council (1903 to 1904), Minister of Education (1904 to 1906), Provincial Secretary (1904 to 1906), Attorney General (1906 to 1907), and Chief Commissioner of Lands and Works (1907 to 1908, and then only responsible for Lands between 1908 and 1909). As Attorney General, he prosecuted and convicted the notorious Bill Miner.

He was elected to the House of Commons of Canada under the banner of Prime Minister Borden's Unionist party in the 1917 general election and served as a Member of Parliament until 1921.

In 1906, he married Winnifred M. Davie, daughter of Hon. A.E.B. Davie. Frederick and Winifred had four sons. Their youngest son Davie Fulton, was also a Kamloops lawyer, provincial and federal politician and judge.
