= Joshua Spencer Thompson =

Belfast-born Canadian politician

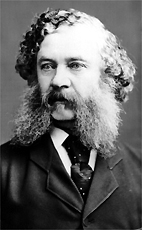

Member of the Canadian Parliament for Cariboo District
- Preceded by: District created in 1871

Member of the Canadian Parliament for Cariboo
- In office 1872–1880
- Succeeded by: James Reid

Personal details
- Born: 1828 Belfast, Ireland
- Died: 20 December 1880 (aged 51–52) Victoria, British Columbia, Canada
- Party: Liberal-Conservative

Joshua Spencer Thompson (1828 – 20 December 1880) was a Canadian journalist and politician.

Born in Belfast, Ireland, Thompson emigrated to British Columbia in 1858. Thompson was a journalist and accountant prior to becoming an MP. A Liberal-Conservative, Thompson sat in the 1st Canadian Parliament as a Member of Parliament in the House of Commons of Canada following his acclamation as member for Cariboo in the special byelection held in 1871 after British Columbia's entry into Confederation. His only actual electoral race was in the 1874 election; in the 1878 election he was acclaimed again and did not seek a further term in office after that. Thompson died in Victoria, British Columbia.
