= Frank Barnard (author) =

British novelist

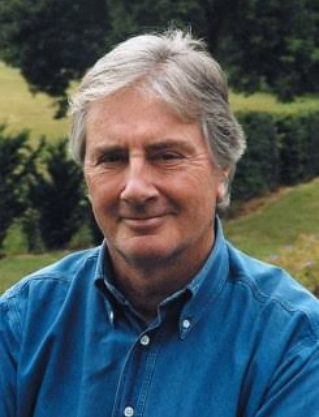
- Barnard in 2018
- Born: Francis Allen Charles Barnard; 15 March 1938 (age 88); Greenwich, London, England
- Occupation: Writer
- Writing career
- Genre: Historical Fiction
- Notable works: Blue Man Falling, A Time For Heroes

Francis Allen Charles Barnard (born 15 March 1938) is a British novelist, journalist and advertising and public relations director. He is best known for his historical novels with a flying background, Blue Man Falling, Band of Eagles, To Play The Fox, A Time For Heroes and A Remembrance of Ghosts.

== Early life ==
Barnard was born on 15 March 1938 in Greenwich, London to Frank Barnard and Susan (née Allen). His father was a telecommunications engineer with Siemens and, later, the GPO, his mother a state registered nurse. His brother, Roger Brackley Barnard, is a painter who lives in Japan. Barnard was educated at Hilden Grange preparatory school, Tonbridge, and Sevenoaks School.

== Career ==
On leaving school at 16 Barnard joined the Kent Messenger as a junior reporter at which time, aged 18, he started on his first (unpublished) novel, The Arena. From 1959 to 1961 he served in the Royal Air Force as a National Serviceman. On demobilisation he became editor of Smiths Industries’ group newspaper and wrote scripts for the Smiths industrial film unit before joining the Norcros Group in 1967 as group public relations manager. A move into PR consultancy led to appointments as managing director of Burson-Marsteller Corporate Communications, chairman and chief executive of Extel Communications and chairman of Fleishman Hillard Europe. During this period he wrote for a wide variety of publications from advertising media to motor sport titles and was a regular contributor to The Oldie as well as a broadcaster on radio and TV.In 2000 he quit advertising and public relations to write fiction full-time. He has since completed five novels.

== Personal life ==
Barnard married Janet (née Allwood) in 1961. They have two daughters, Helen Louise and Katherine Jane, born 1964 and 1967 respectively. Barnard is a weekend racing driver with a driving career spanning fifty years in many different cars and a variety of disciplines from circuit races to sprints and hill climbs. He is believed to be the only novelist to have competed in the international Formula Ford Festival at Brands Hatch driving his Dulon MP21/78. He also sails a Corribee sloop from Rye Harbour.

== Works ==
=== Novels ===
Barnard wrote his first novel, ‘One Day’, between 1957 and 1959. It amounted to 104,000 words and though praised as ‘highly promising’ by legendary agent Osyth Leeston of A.M.Heath it remained unpublished. Barnard, now focussed on a career in the media, resolved to return to fiction at some future time but nearly fifty years passed before his debut novel, ‘Blue Man Falling’ was published by Headline in 2006.

Barnard's debut novel, Blue Man Falling, was published by Headline in 2006. This chronicled the lives of RAF fighter pilots in the Battle of France. It formed the first in a trilogy of novels following the Englishman Kit Curtis and American Ossie Wolf to Malta (Band of Eagles) and North Africa (To Play The Fox). A fourth, standalone, novel, A Time For Heroes, described as a "sweeping, three-generation historical epic encompassing both World Wars, about heroism, the romance of aviation and the conflict between fathers and sons", was published by Headline in 2012. His fifth novel, A Remembrance Of Ghosts, a postwar mystery thriller set in the world of journalism, was released on Amazon Kindle in October 2019, described by crime writer Peter James as "superb, a wonderful book".

- Blue Man Falling (novel, 2006)
- Band of Eagles (novel, 2007)
- To Play The Fox (novel, 2008)
- A Time For Heroes (novel, 2012)
- A Remembrance of Ghosts (novel, 2019)

Reaction to Barnard's novels has been generally positive, focusing on the authenticity of the history and characters. Jeremy Jehu in The Daily Telegraph noted of Blue Man Falling that "Barnard subtly deflates the rhetoric of derring-do with never a jarring hint that his tenderly drawn pilots are not wholly rooted in their time. His fine balance of freshness and authenticity is, most assuredly, no literary piece of cake."
