= Lillooet Suspension Bridge =

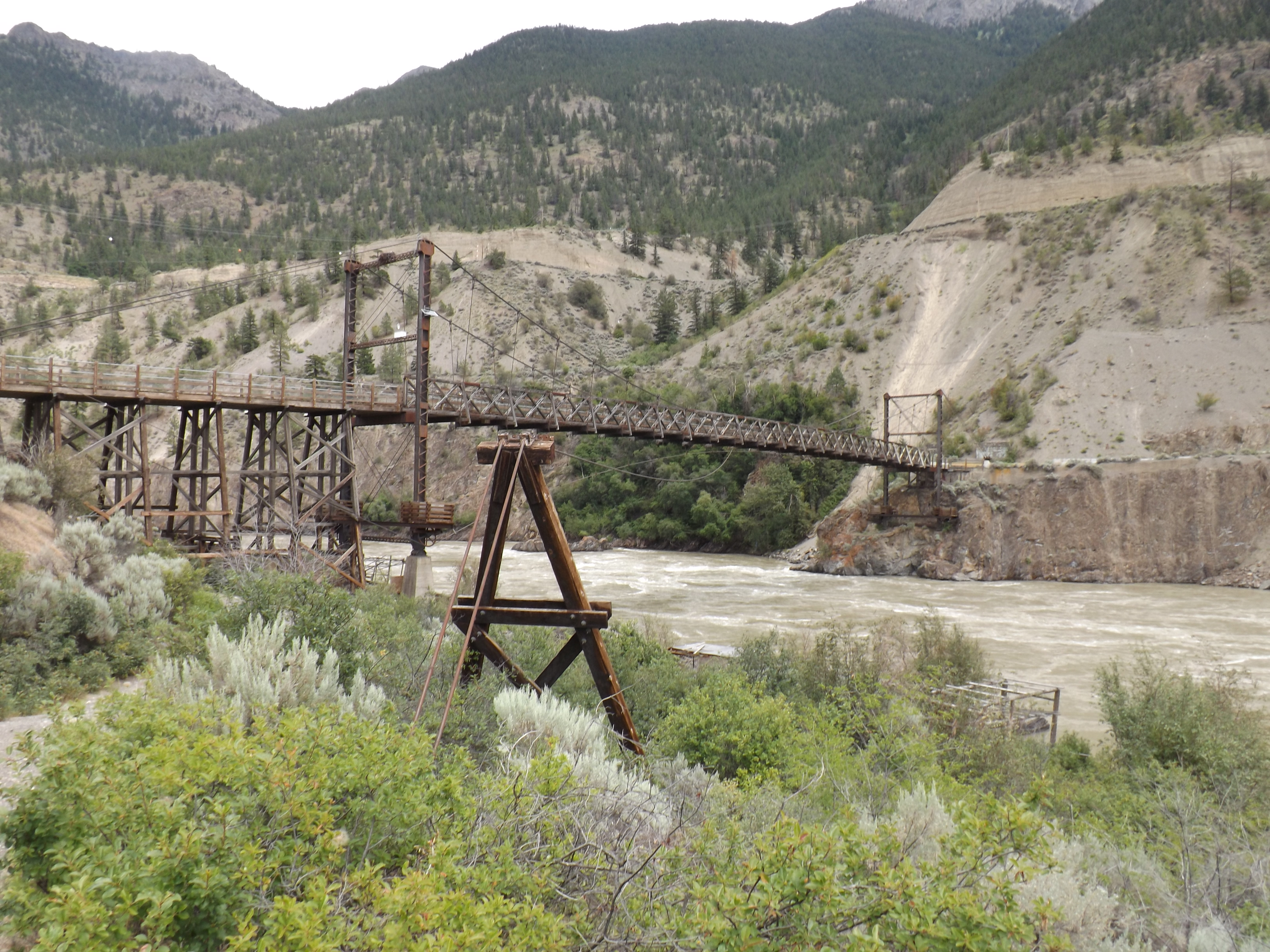
- Coordinates: 50.7115°N 121.9114°W
- Carries: Pedestrians and bicycles
- Crosses: Fraser River
- Locale: Lillooet, British Columbia

Characteristics
- Design: Suspension bridge
- Total length: 161 metres (528 ft)
- Longest span: 121.9 metres (400 ft)

History
- Opened: 1913

The Lillooet Suspension Bridge, also known as the Lillooet Old Bridge, is a suspension bridge located in Lillooet, British Columbia. The bridge passes over the Fraser River and connects the town of Lillooet with British Columbia Highway 99.

== History ==
The Lillooet Suspension Bridge was constructed in 1913, replacing a truss bridge that was completed in 1889, which itself replaced a reaction-cable ferry known as Miller's Ferry, which had operated between 1860 and 1888. The suspension bridge carried one lane of vehicle traffic until the completion of the Bridge of the Twenty-Three Camels in 1981. When the new highway bridge opened, the much older suspension bridge was called "The Old Bridge" by locals.

In 2003, the District of Lillooet and the British Columbia Ministry of Transportation restored the bridge as a pedestrian-only crossing. The Lillooet Naturalist Society also advocated for the installation bat houses on the structure as a part of the restoration project.

== See also ==
- List of crossings of the Fraser River
- List of bridges in Canada
