= Frank Oberle Sr. =

Canadian politician (1932–2024)

The Honourable Frank Oberle PC

Minister of Forestry
- In office February 23, 1990 – June 24, 1993
- Prime Minister: Brian Mulroney
- Preceded by: Jack Davis (1971)
- Succeeded by: Bobbie Sparrow

Member of the Canadian Parliament for Prince George—Peace River
- In office October 30, 1972 – October 25, 1993
- Preceded by: Robert Borrie
- Succeeded by: Jay Hill

Personal details
- Born: March 24, 1932 Forchheim, Baden, Germany
- Died: September 12, 2024 (aged 92) Squamish, British Columbia, Canada
- Party: Progressive Conservative
- Children: Frank Oberle Jr.

Frank Oberle Sr. PC (March 24, 1932 – September 12, 2024) was a Canadian businessman and politician.

== Life and career ==
Born in Forchheim near Karlsruhe, Germany, Oberle moved with his family to German-occupied Poland in 1941. There he was placed in a Hitler Youth indoctrination program. Later, he fled the Red Army advance, surviving on grass and stolen eggs while walking 800 kilometres to his home village in the Black Forest. Rejected by his relatives, he immigrated to Canada at the age of 19 and became a logger and then a gold miner.

Oberle entered municipal politics, becoming mayor of Chetwynd. He entered federal politics and was elected to the House of Commons of Canada in the 1972 general election as the Progressive Conservative Member of Parliament for Prince George—Peace River, British Columbia. He subsequently won re-election five times.

In 1985, Oberle became the first German-born federal Canadian cabinet minister when he became Minister of State for Science and Technology in Prime Minister Brian Mulroney's government. He was science minister when the Canadarm went into space as part of the Space Shuttle program. He later became Minister of State for Forestry, and then Minister of Forestry in 1990.

Oberle retired from Cabinet when Kim Campbell succeeded Mulroney as Prime Minister, and retired from politics with the dissolution of the 34th Canadian Parliament for the 1993 election.

In 2004, Oberle published a memoir of his World War II experiences, Finding Home: A War Child’s Journey to Peace (2004). A second memoir, A Chosen Path: From Moccasin Flats to Parliament Hill, was published in the same year.

His son Frank Oberle Jr. was elected to the Legislative Assembly of Alberta in the 2004 provincial election, and was appointed Solicitor General on January 13, 2010.

Oberle died on September 12, 2024, in Squamish, British Columbia, two weeks after his wife of Joan, at the age of 92.

== Electoral history ==
1988 Canadian federal election: Prince George—Peace River
Party	Candidate	Votes	%	±%
Progressive Conservative	Frank Oberle Sr.	13,903	39.60	–22.84
New Democratic	Alan Timberlake	11,684	33.28	+9.17
Reform	Jay Hill	5,077	14.46	–
Liberal	Jacques Monlezun	4,183	11.92	+1.97
Independent	Howard Karpes	169	0.48	–
Confederation of Regions	Lorne W. Backus	89	0.25	–0.74
Total valid votes		35,105	99.62	
Total rejected ballots		133	0.38	+0.09
Turnout		35,238	71.79	+2.83
Eligible voters		49,087		
Progressive Conservative hold		Swing		–16.00
Source: Elections Canada

1984 Canadian federal election: Prince George—Peace River
Party	Candidate	Votes	%	±%
Progressive Conservative	Frank Oberle Sr.	21,154	62.44	+10.34
New Democratic	Jim Best	8,168	24.11	–2.09
Liberal	Paul Bouey	3,368	9.94	–9.39
Rhinoceros	J. Paul Ekering	385	1.14	–
Social Credit	Richard J. Lawrence	342	1.01	–1.37
Confederation of Regions	John F. Light	335	0.99	–
Libertarian	Sid Schneider	127	0.37	–
Total valid votes		33,879	99.71	
Total rejected ballots		98	0.29	+0.03
Turnout		33,977	68.96	+10.24
Eligible voters		49,270		
Progressive Conservative hold		Swing		+6.22
Source: Elections Canada

1984 Canadian federal election: Prince George—Peace River
Party	Candidate	Votes	%	±%
Progressive Conservative	Frank Oberle Sr.	21,154	62.44	+10.34
New Democratic	Jim Best	8,168	24.11	–2.09
Liberal	Paul Bouey	3,368	9.94	–9.39
Rhinoceros	J. Paul Ekering	385	1.14	–
Social Credit	Richard J. Lawrence	342	1.01	–1.37
Confederation of Regions	John F. Light	335	0.99	–
Libertarian	Sid Schneider	127	0.37	–
Total valid votes		33,879	99.71	
Total rejected ballots		98	0.29	+0.03
Turnout		33,977	68.96	+10.24
Eligible voters		49,270		
Progressive Conservative hold		Swing		+6.22
Source: Elections Canada

1980 Canadian federal election: Prince George—Peace River
Party	Candidate	Votes	%	±%
Progressive Conservative	Frank Oberle Sr.	13,593	52.10	–8.85
New Democratic	Bob Simpson	6,835	26.20	+5.70
Liberal	Jim McIntyre	5,044	19.33	+0.78
Social Credit	Richard J. Lawrence	620	2.38	–
Total valid votes		26,092	99.74	
Total rejected ballots		68	0.26	+0.02
Turnout		26,160	58.72	–8.01
Eligible voters		44,552		
Progressive Conservative hold		Swing		–7.28
Source: Elections Canada

1979 Canadian federal election: Prince George—Peace River
Party	Candidate	Votes	%	±%
Progressive Conservative	Frank Oberle Sr.	16,288	60.95	+14.11
New Democratic	Bob Simpson	5,478	20.50	+5.83
Liberal	Les Broddy	4,957	18.55	–15.79
Total valid votes		26,723	99.76	
Total rejected ballots		64	0.24	–0.04
Turnout		26,787	66.72	+0.60
Eligible voters		40,146		
Progressive Conservative hold		Swing		+4.14
Source: Elections Canada

1974 Canadian federal election: Prince George—Peace River
Party	Candidate	Votes	%	±%
Progressive Conservative	Frank Oberle Sr.	18,769	46.84	+7.48
Liberal	Allan Bate	13,759	34.33	+2.72
New Democratic	Stuart Robert Steventon	5,880	14.67	–7.03
Social Credit	Wendell Philip Smith	1,665	4.15	–3.17
Total valid votes		40,073	99.72	
Total rejected ballots		113	0.28	–0.31
Turnout		40,186	66.12	–1.19
Eligible voters		60,773		
Progressive Conservative hold		Swing		+2.38
Source: Library of Parliament

1972 Canadian federal election: Prince George—Peace River
Party	Candidate	Votes	%	±%
Progressive Conservative	Frank Oberle Sr.	14,648	39.36	+9.66
Liberal	Bob Borrie	11,766	31.62	–3.30
New Democratic	William Marshall Close	8,076	21.70	–0.33
Social Credit	Al Kruegar	2,726	7.32	–4.74
Total valid votes		37,216	99.41	
Total rejected ballots		220	0.59	–0.09
Turnout		37,436	67.31	–2.82
Eligible voters		55,614		
Progressive Conservative gain from Liberal		Swing		+6.48
Source: Library of Parliament

== Bibliography ==
- Oberle, Frank (2004). Finding Home: A War Child's Journey to Peace. Surrey, BC: Heritage House. ISBN 978-1-894384-76-6. OCLC 56370627.
- Oberle, Frank (2005). A chosen path : from Moccasin Flats to Parliament Hill. Surrey, BC: Heritage House. ISBN 978-1-894384-83-4. OCLC 60318962.
