= James Reid (Canadian politician) =

Canadian politician (1839–1904)

The Honourable James Reid
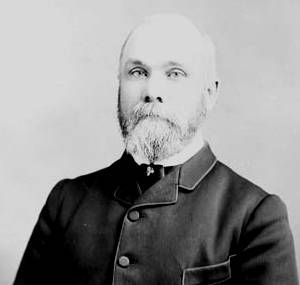

Canadian Senator from British Columbia
- In office October 8, 1888 – May 3, 1904
- Appointed by: John A. Macdonald

Member of Parliament for Cariboo
- In office 1881–1888
- Preceded by: Joshua Spencer Thompson
- Succeeded by: Francis Stillman Barnard

Personal details
- Born: August 2, 1839 Wakefield, Lower Canada
- Died: May 3, 1904 (aged 64) Vancouver, British Columbia, Canada
- Party: Liberal-Conservative

James Reid (August 2, 1839 – May 3, 1904) was a Canadian entrepreneur and parliamentarian from British Columbia.

== Background ==
Reid was born in Wakefield, Lower Canada, the son of James Reid and Ann Maxwell, and was educated in Hull, Quebec and Ottawa. He moved to British Columbia in 1862, with a cousin, nearly perishing on the trip to the northern Cariboo region. Reid eventually prospered as a miner and established his own business empire in Quesnellemouth (now Quesnel). In 1883, he married Charlotte Clarke. Reid's business included saw and flour mills, mining operations, riverboat construction and the main general store in Quesnel. Reid owned his own riverboat, the Charlotte which was one of the main supply vessels into the area.

Reid was elected to Member of Parliament for Cariboo as a Liberal-Conservative in an 1881 by-election on the death of incumbent MP Joshua Spencer Thompson. He was acclaimed in the following federal election and re-elected in 1887. Prime Minister Macdonald appointed Reid to the Senate in 1888. He held that office until his death in Vancouver in 1904.
