= Prince George—Peace River—Northern Rockies =

Federal electoral district in British Columbia, Canada

Coordinates: 56.7°N 122.4°W

British Columbia electoral district
- Interactive map of riding boundaries from the 2025 federal election. Point indicates the city of Prince George.

Federal electoral district
- Legislature: House of Commons
MP
Bob Zimmer
Conservative
- District created: 1966
- First contested: 1968
- Last contested: 2025
- District webpage: profile, map

Demographics
- Population (2011): 107,382
- Electors (2015): 75,063
- Area (km²): 243,276
- Pop. density (per km²): 0.44
- Census division(s): Northern Rockies Regional Municipality, Peace River Regional District, Regional District of Fraser-Fort George
- Census subdivision(s): Prince George (part), Fort St. John, Dawson Creek, Northern Rockies, Mackenzie, Tumbler Ridge, Chetwynd, Taylor, Valemount, Hudson's Hope

Prince George—Peace River—Northern Rockies (previously Prince George—Peace River) is a federal electoral district in northern British Columbia, Canada. It has been represented in the House of Commons of Canada since 1968.

== Geography ==
It consists of all of the province of British Columbia east of the Great Divide and some communities west of the divide. It contains large areas of uninhabited wilderness.

Communities include the oil-and-gas exploration centre of Fort St. John; Fort Nelson, with the province's biggest wood products plant; Dawson Creek; Large Coal Mining operations in Tumbler Ridge and the part of Prince George north of the Nechako River and east of the Fraser River.

== History ==
This electoral district was originally created in 1966 from parts of Cariboo and Kamloops ridings.

It was abolished in 1976 when it was redistributed into Fort Nelson—Peace River riding and a part of Prince George—Bulkley Valley ridings. In 1978, Fort Nelson—Peace River was renamed "Prince George—Peace River". There were no elections during the period it was called "Fort Nelson—Peace River".

This riding has elected conservative candidates consistently since 1972: Progressive Conservative Frank Oberle from 1972 to 1993, and Reform Party of Canada/Canadian Alliance/Conservative Jay Hill from 1993 until 2010. The district is currently represented by Bob Zimmer of the Conservatives.

The 2012 federal electoral boundaries redistribution concluded that the electoral boundaries of Prince George—Peace River should be adjusted, and a modified electoral district will be contested in future elections. The redefined riding regains the community of Valemount and area that had been transferred to Kamloops—Thompson—Cariboo in the previous redistribution. Although not directly related to this boundary adjustment, the riding was renamed as Prince George—Peace River—Northern Rockies to acknowledge the Northern Rockies Regional District, whose status in the riding is unchanged. These new boundaries and the new name were legally defined in the 2013 representation order, which came into effect upon the call of the 2015 Canadian federal election.

== Demographics ==
Panethnic groups in Prince George—Peace River—Northern Rockies (2011−2021)
Panethnic group	2021		2016		2011	
Panethnic group	Pop.	%	Pop.	%	Pop.	%
European (Note: Statistic includes all persons that did not make up part of a visible minority or an indigenous identity.)	81,720	76.47%	86,395	79.39%	87,960	83.54%
Indigenous	16,670	15.6%	16,655	15.31%	13,860	13.16%
Southeast Asian (Note: Statistic includes total responses of "Filipino" and "Southeast Asian" under visible minority section on census.)	3,065	2.87%	2,135	1.96%	1,120	1.06%
South Asian	2,380	2.23%	1,350	1.24%	950	0.9%
East Asian (Note: Statistic includes total responses of "Chinese", "Korean", and "Japanese" under visible minority section on census.)	1,270	1.19%	800	0.74%	730	0.69%
African	1,020	0.95%	765	0.7%	385	0.37%
Latin American	250	0.23%	225	0.21%	120	0.11%
Middle Eastern (Note: Statistic includes total responses of "West Asian" and "Arab" under visible minority section on census.)	115	0.11%	230	0.21%	90	0.09%
Other (Note: Statistic includes total responses of "Visible minority, n.i.e." and "Multiple visible minorities" under visible minority section on census.)	380	0.36%	270	0.25%	75	0.07%
Total responses	106,865	98.04%	108,820	98.04%	105,295	98.06%
Total population	108,998	100%	110,995	100%	107,382	100%
Notes: Totals greater than 100% due to multiple origin responses. Demographics based on 2012 Canadian federal electoral redistribution riding boundaries.

== Members of Parliament ==
This riding has elected the following members of Parliament:

Parliament	Years	Member	Party
Prince George—Peace River; Riding created from Cariboo and Kamloops
28th	1968–1972	Robert Borrie	Liberal
29th	1972–1974	Frank Oberle Sr.	Progressive Conservative
30th	1974–1979	Frank Oberle Sr.	Progressive Conservative
31st	1979–1980	Frank Oberle Sr.	Progressive Conservative
32nd	1980–1984	Frank Oberle Sr.	Progressive Conservative
33rd	1984–1988	Frank Oberle Sr.	Progressive Conservative
34th	1988–1993	Frank Oberle Sr.	Progressive Conservative
35th	1993–1997	Jay Hill	Reform
36th	1997–2000	Jay Hill	Reform
36th	2000–2000	Jay Hill	Alliance
37th	2000–2003	Jay Hill	Alliance
37th	2003–2004	Jay Hill	Conservative
38th	2004–2006	Jay Hill	Conservative
39th	2006–2008	Jay Hill	Conservative
40th	2008–2010	Jay Hill	Conservative
41st	2011–2015	Bob Zimmer	Conservative
Prince George—Peace River—Northern Rockies
42nd	2015–2019	Bob Zimmer	Conservative
43rd	2019–2021	Bob Zimmer	Conservative
44th	2021–2025	Bob Zimmer	Conservative
45th	2025–present	Bob Zimmer	Conservative

=== Current member of Parliament ===
Its current member of Parliament is Bob Zimmer. He was first elected in 2011. He represents the Conservative Party of Canada.

== Election results ==
Graph of election results in Peace River—Northern Rockies (minor parties that never got 2% of the vote or didn't run consistently are omitted)

=== Prince George—Peace River—Northern Rockies, 2015–present ===
2025 Canadian federal election
** Preliminary results — Not yet official **
Party	Candidate	Votes	%	±%	Expenditures
Conservative	Bob Zimmer	37,322	70.93	+11.60	
Liberal	Peter Njenga	10,290	19.56	+10.31	
New Democratic	Cory Grizz Longley	3,201	6.08	–8.29	
Green	Mary Forbes	1,121	2.13	–1.35	
People's	David Watson	683	1.30	–9.10	
Total valid votes/expense limit					
Total rejected ballots					
Turnout		52,617	59.26		
Eligible voters		88,784			
Conservative notional hold		Swing		+0.65	
Source: Elections Canada

2021 federal election redistributed results
Party	Vote	%
Conservative	30,874	59.33
New Democratic	7,479	14.37
People's	5,410	10.40
Liberal	4,815	9.25
Green	1,812	3.48
Others	1,648	3.17

2021 Canadian federal election
Party	Candidate	Votes	%	±%	Expenditures
Conservative	Bob Zimmer	29,882	60.7	-9.1	$71,706.36
New Democratic	Cory Grizz Longley	6,647	13.5	+4.3	$6,918.81
People's	Ryan Dyck	5,138	10.4	+7.2	$25,911.91
Liberal	Amir Alavi	4,236	8.6	-3.0	$0.00
Green	Catharine Kendall	1,661	3.4	-2.9	$7,821.16
Maverick	David Jeffers	1,580	3.3	—	$25,911.91
Canada's Fourth Front	Phil Hewkin	53	0.1	—	$0.00
Total valid votes/expense limit		49,197	99.13	-0.46	$138,271.14
Total rejected ballots		430	0.87	+0.46	
Turnout		49,627	62.1	-7.7	
Eligible voters		79,952			
Conservative hold		Swing		-11.0	
Source: Elections Canada

2019 Canadian federal election
Party	Candidate	Votes	%	±%	Expenditures
Conservative	Bob Zimmer	38,473	69.8	+17.30	$77,720.06
Liberal	Mavis Erickson	6,391	11.6	-13.30	$15,885.38
New Democratic	Marcia Luccock	5,069	9.2	-6.30	none listed
Green	Catharine Kendall	3,448	6.3	+1.10	none listed
People's	Ron Vaillant	1,748	3.2	-	$5,312.80
Total valid votes/expense limit		55,129	100.0		
Total rejected ballots		283			
Turnout		55,412	69.8		
Eligible voters		79,397			
Conservative hold		Swing		+15.30	
Source: Elections Canada

2015 Canadian federal election
Party	Candidate	Votes	%	±%	Expenditures
Conservative	Bob Zimmer	27,237	52.52	-9.33	$94,031.80
Liberal	Matt Shaw	12,913	24.90	+19.74	$4,485.98
New Democratic	Kathi Dickie	8,014	15.45	-10.40	$3,712.11
Green	Elizabeth Biggar	2,672	5.15	-0.91	$2,593.07
Libertarian	W. Todd Keller	559	1.08	–	–
Progressive Canadian	Barry Blackman	464	0.89	–	–
Total valid votes/expense limit		51,859	100.00	–	$260,780.28
Total rejected ballots		197	0.38	–	
Turnout		52,056	68.21	–	
Eligible voters		76,312			
Conservative hold		Swing		-14.53	
Source: Elections Canada

2011 federal election redistributed results
Party	Vote	%
Conservative	24,348	61.85
New Democratic	10,177	25.85
Green	2,386	6.06
Liberal	2,033	5.16
Others	421	1.07

=== Prince George—Peace River, 1968–2015 ===
2011 Canadian federal election: Prince George—Peace River
Party	Candidate	Votes	%	±%	Expenditures
Conservative	Bob Zimmer	23,946	62.12	−1.47	$81,669
New Democratic	Lois Boone	9,876	25.62	+8.04	$38,397
Green	Hilary Crowley	2,301	5.97	−4.44	$11,625
Liberal	Ben Levine	2,008	5.21	−3.20	$9,197
Pirate	Jeremy Cote	415	1.08	–	
Total valid votes		38,546	100.0		
Total rejected ballots		125	0.32	−0.03	
Turnout		38,671	54.08	+5	
Eligible voters		71,507			
Conservative hold		Swing		−4.76	

2008 Canadian federal election: Prince George—Peace River
Party	Candidate	Votes	%	±%	Expenditures
Conservative	Jay Hill	22,325	63.59	+3.71	$37,923
New Democratic	Betty Bekkering	6,170	17.58	+0.58	$8,563
Green	Hilary Crowley	3,656	10.41	+4.00	$7,222
Liberal	Lindsay Gidney	2,954	8.41	-7.34	
Total valid votes/expense limit		35,105	100.0		$102,073
Total rejected ballots		125	0.35	+0.06	
Turnout		35,230	49		
Conservative hold		Swing		+1.56	

2006 Canadian federal election: Prince George—Peace River
Party	Candidate	Votes	%	±%	Expenditures
Conservative	Jay Hill	22,409	59.88	+1.17	$62,176
New Democratic	Malcolm Crockett	6,363	17.00	-3.69	$10,141
Liberal	Nathan Bauder	5,895	15.75	+1.99	$3,983
Green	Hilary Crowley	2,400	6.41	+0.70	$4,838
Independent	Donna Young	359	0.96	–	$589
Total valid votes		34,807	100.0		
Total rejected ballots		103	0.30	-0.14	
Turnout		34,807	53	-0.56	
Conservative hold		Swing		+2.43	

2004 Canadian federal election: Prince George—Peace River
Party	Candidate	Votes	%	±%	Expenditures
Conservative	Jay Hill	21,281	58.71	-17.04	$53,326
New Democratic	Michael Hunter	7,501	20.69	+16.03	$11,997
Liberal	Arleene Thorpe	4,988	13.76	-1.77	$19,341
Green	Hilary Crowley	2,073	5.71	+3.54	$1,252
Canadian Action	Harley J. Harasym	301	0.83	-0.81	$1,028
Marxist–Leninist	Tara Rimstad	101	0.27	+0.04	
Total valid votes		36,245	100.0		
Total rejected ballots		162	0.44	+0.10	
Turnout		36,407	53.56	-3.09	
Conservative hold		Swing		-16.54	
Change for the Conservatives is based on the totals of the Canadian Alliance and the Progressive Conservatives.

2000 Canadian federal election: Prince George—Peace River
Party	Candidate	Votes	%	±%	Expenditures
Alliance	Jay Hill	23,840	69.61	+2.70	$47,199
Liberal	Arleene Thorpe	5,319	15.53	-1.54	$22,183
Progressive Conservative	Jan Christiansen	2,103	6.14	+0.40	$4,980
New Democratic	Lenart Nelson	1,597	4.66	-4.32	$4,329
Green	Hilary Crowley	744	2.17	+0.89	$1,306
Canadian Action	Henry A. Dunbar	562	1.64	–	$2,640
Marxist–Leninist	Colby Nicholson	80	0.23	–	$8
Total valid votes		34,245	100.0		
Total rejected ballots		118	0.34	+0.03	
Turnout		34,363	56.65	-0.90	
Alliance hold		Swing		+2.12	
Change for the Canadian Alliance is based on the Reform Party.

1997 Canadian federal election: Prince George—Peace River
Party	Candidate	Votes	%	±%	Expenditures
Reform	Jay Hill	22,270	66.91	+10.60	$48,148
Liberal	Barb Shirley	5,683	17.07	-2.38	$23,330
New Democratic	Alex Michalos	2,989	8.98	-2.19	$14,819
Progressive Conservative	Charles Lugosi	1,911	5.74	-5.44	$16,754
Green	Julie Zammuto	429	1.28	–	$450
Total valid votes		33,282	100.0		
Total rejected ballots		105	0.31		
Turnout		33,387	57.55		
Reform hold		Swing		+6.49	

1993 Canadian federal election: Prince George—Peace River
Party	Candidate	Votes	%	±%
Reform	Jay Hill	20,671	56.31	+41.85
Liberal	Jacques Monlezun	7,140	19.45	+7.54
Progressive Conservative	Ted Sandhu	4,104	11.18	-28.42
New Democratic	Alan Timberlake	4,099	11.17	-22.12
Natural Law	Robert Walker	292	0.80	–
Christian Heritage	John Van der Woude	198	0.54	–
Commonwealth of Canada	Dorothy Folk	114	0.31	–
Independent	Archie Tannock	89	0.24	–
Total valid votes		36,707	100.0	
Reform gain from Progressive Conservative		Swing		+17.16

1988 Canadian federal election: Prince George—Peace River
Party	Candidate	Votes	%	±%
Progressive Conservative	Frank Oberle Sr.	13,903	39.60	-22.84
New Democratic	Alan Timberlake	11,684	33.28	+9.17
Reform	Jay Hill	5,077	14.46	–
Liberal	Jacques Monlezun	4,183	11.92	+1.97
Independent	Howard Karpes	169	0.48	–
Confederation of Regions	Lorne W. Backus	89	0.25	-0.74
Total valid votes		35,105	100.0	
Progressive Conservative hold		Swing		-16.00

1984 Canadian federal election: Prince George—Peace River
Party	Candidate	Votes	%	±%
Progressive Conservative	Frank Oberle Sr.	21,154	62.44	+10.34
New Democratic	Jim Best	8,168	24.11	-2.09
Liberal	Paul Bouey	3,368	9.94	-9.39
Rhinoceros	J. Paul Ekering	385	1.14	–
Social Credit	Richard J. Lawrence	342	1.01	-1.37
Confederation of Regions	John F. Light	335	0.99	–
Libertarian	Sid Schneider	127	0.37	–
Total valid votes		33,879	100.0	
Progressive Conservative hold		Swing		+6.22

1980 Canadian federal election: Prince George—Peace River
Party	Candidate	Votes	%	±%
Progressive Conservative	Frank Oberle Sr.	13,593	52.10	-8.85
New Democratic	Bob Simpson	6,835	26.20	+5.70
Liberal	Jim McIntyre	5,044	19.33	+0.78
Social Credit	Richard J. Lawrence	620	2.38	–
Total valid votes		26,092	100.0	
Progressive Conservative hold		Swing		-7.28
lop.parl.ca

1979 Canadian federal election: Prince George—Peace River
Party	Candidate	Votes	%	±%
Progressive Conservative	Frank Oberle Sr.	16,288	60.95	+14.11
New Democratic	Bob Simpson	5,478	20.50	+5.83
Liberal	Les Broddy	4,957	18.55	-15.79
Total valid votes		26,723	100.0	
Progressive Conservative hold		Swing		+4.14

1974 Canadian federal election: Prince George—Peace River
Party	Candidate	Votes	%	±%
Progressive Conservative	Frank Oberle Sr.	18,769	46.84	+7.48
Liberal	Allan Bate	13,759	34.33	+2.72
New Democratic	Stuart Robert Steventon	5,880	14.67	-7.03
Social Credit	Wendell Philip Smith	1,665	4.15	-3.17
Total valid votes		40,073	100.0	
Progressive Conservative hold		Swing		+2.38

1972 Canadian federal election: Prince George—Peace River
Party	Candidate	Votes	%	±%
Progressive Conservative	Frank Oberle Sr.	14,648	39.36	+9.66
Liberal	Robert Borrie	11,766	31.62	-3.30
New Democratic	Bill Close	8,076	21.70	-0.33
Social Credit	Al Kruegar	2,726	7.32	-4.74
Total valid votes		37,216	100.0	
Progressive Conservative gain from Liberal		Swing		+6.48

1968 Canadian federal election: Prince George—Peace River
Party	Candidate	Votes	%
Liberal	Robert Borrie	10,926	34.92
Progressive Conservative	Peter Runkle	9,293	29.70
New Democratic	Erhart Regier	6,894	22.03
Social Credit	Bert Leboe	3,776	12.07
Independent	John H. Powers	402	1.28
Total valid votes		31,291	100.0
This riding was created from Cariboo and Kamloops, which elected a Social Credit and a Progressive Conservative, respectively, in the last election. Bert Leboe was the incumbent from Cariboo.

== See also ==
- List of Canadian electoral districts
- Historical federal electoral districts of Canada
