= Bob Borrie =

Canadian politician

Robert James Borrie

Member of the Canadian Parliament for Prince George—Peace River
- In office 1968–1972
- Preceded by: Riding was originally created in 1966 from parts of Cariboo and Kamloops
- Succeeded by: Frank Oberle

Personal details
- Born: December 31, 1926 Cobalt, Ontario, Canada
- Died: December 26, 1999 (aged 72)
- Party: Liberal
- Occupation: manager secretary

Robert James Borrie (December 31, 1926 – December 26, 1999) was a Canadian politician, manager and secretary. He was elected to the House of Commons of Canada in the 1968 election as a Member of the Liberal Party to represent the riding of Prince George—Peace River. He was a member of the House of Commons Standing Committee on Agriculture. He was defeated in the 1972 election. Prior to his federal political experience, he served in the Canadian Army as a corporal in 1945.
