= Thomas George McBride =

Canadian politician (1867–1950)

Member of Parliament for Cariboo
- In office December 1921 – September 1925
- Preceded by: Frederick John Fulton
- Succeeded by: John Anderson Fraser

Personal details
- Born: Thomas George McBride; 5 August 1867 Keady, Ireland
- Died: 15 June 1950 (aged 82) Vancouver, British Columbia, Canada
- Party: Progressive
- Spouse: Maud Edgett
- Profession: Farmer

Thomas George McBride (5 August 1867 – 15 June 1950) was a Progressive party member of the House of Commons of Canada. He was born in Keady, Ireland and became a farmer.

The son of Robert McBride and Rachel Maxwell, he was educated in Ireland and farmed there from 1887 to 1892, when he came to Canada. In 1899, McBride married Maud Edgett. He founded T.G. McBride and Company, Builder's Supplies in Vancouver, British Columbia and was manager of the company. McBride also built boats.

In 1909 and 1910, McBride was a municipal alderman for Vancouver. In 1912, he purchased a cattle ranch in Kamloops.

He was elected to Parliament at the Cariboo riding in the 1921 general election. After serving his only federal term, the 14th Canadian Parliament, McBride was defeated by John Anderson Fraser of the Conservatives.
