= George Matheson Murray =

Canadian politician

George Murray

Member of Parliament for Cariboo
- In office 27 June 1949 – 9 August 1953
- Preceded by: William Irvine
- Succeeded by: Bert Leboe

MLA for Lillooet
- In office 2 November 1933 – 20 October 1941
- Preceded by: Ernest Crawford Carson
- Succeeded by: Ernest Crawford Carson

Personal details
- Born: George Matheson Murray; 27 July 1889 Woodstock, Ontario, Canada
- Died: 19 August 1961 (aged 72) Vancouver, British Columbia, Canada
- Party: Liberal
- Spouse: Margaret Theresa Lally (m. 1913)
- Children: 2
- Profession: Editor; journalist

George Matheson Murray (27 July 1889 – 19 August 1961), known publicly as George Murray, was a publisher and politician in British Columbia in the first half of the 20th century. He played a role in the founding of the Boy Scouts of Canada. Murray is best known as the husband of Margaret Lally "Ma" Murray.

== Early life and career ==
Murray was originally a reporter for the Ottawa Citizen. He was schooled informally in politics by Prime Minister Wilfrid Laurier, with whom he rode the streetcar to work every morning. After moving to British Columbia he started a weekly newspaper, The Chinook, from an office in South Vancouver. Murray was active in Liberal Party politics and local society. It was during this period that he hired (and later married) Margaret Lally. Unable to enlist during World War I due to health problems, he folded The Chinook for financial reasons and moved to Anmore (near Port Moody) and worked as a reporter and editor with the Vancouver News-Advertiser (predecessor of the Vancouver Sun). During the Murrays' time in Anmore, they launched Country Life (a magazine for rural women which was popular for many years). The Murray home in Anmore is the village hall, and Ma Murray Days are celebrated each September.

In Anmore, the Murrays arranged the funeral of Vancouver's pioneer bartender and longtime volunteer lifeguard Joe Fortes in 1922 with phone calls to their connections in town (including the bishop who had married them). They also promoted the construction and dedication of the Peace Arch and the international peace park at the Blaine border crossing in 1921.

A promoter of railways, agriculture, resource exploration in British Columbia's north (and interior) and the potential for trade with China, Murray accepted the Liberal Party nomination for provincial legislature in the wilderness riding of Lillooet and moved the family there in 1933. He and his wife founded the Bridge River-Lillooet News and the Mines Communicator, a satellite publication serving the goldfield towns of the Bridge River country west of Lillooet. They also launched the Howe Sound Tribune in Squamish, and continued to publish Country Life.

The Murrays made an official visit to Shanghai at the outbreak of the War in the Pacific, and had to be evacuated during its bombardment by the Japanese. With the banks closed, Margaret fortunately found a Canadian 50-cent piece hidden in her sewing purse to purchase a rickshaw ride to the city's harbour. Evacuation to a waiting American warship was procured, and the MLA was announced as the Premier of British Columbia (apparently a ruse by his wife to assure passage).

When they returned to Lillooet, they found the town's rail siding lined with rail cars packed with Japanese-Canadian evacuees from the coast, many of whom would remain in the area for the duration of the war. The Murrays launched a fundraising campaign for Chinese relief, raising $20,000 from local Chinese merchants. During their absence the Murrays left the newspaper business in the hands of their young-adult children Dan and Georgina, who moved the Howe Sound Tribune to Williams Lake in violation of wartime newsprint-rationing rules (where it remains as the Williams Lake Tribune).

Murray promoted the economic potential of his riding, paying for junkets for businessmen and investors to the Bridge River Country goldfields. He and Margaret were also enthusiastic promoters about the region's history, and headed a campaign to erect a "Mile O Cairn" in Lillooet to commemorate the original Cariboo Wagon Road (which began at the head of the town's main street). Murray lobbied for road construction to support development of the Blue Creek gold find in the Shulaps Range near Big Dog Mountain, which would have seen a highway routed to Gold Bridge and Bralorne via the north end of the range (instead of the Bridge River Canyon, where Highway 40 connects.

The Murrays' support for striking miners at Bralorne-Pioneer Mine sparked an advertising boycott by the mine company and other businesses, forcing the closure of the Mines Communicator and the sale of the Bridge River-Lillooet News. With most of his supporters (the miners) away at war Murray lost the 1941 election. The Murrays, now pariahs in the region and with George losing his seat in the provincial legislature, moved to the boom town of Fort St. John in the province's northeast Peace River Country and founded the Alaska Highway News. In 1945 Murray ran unsuccessfully in the Lillooet riding (commuting from Fort St. John for the campaign) under the Liberal Progressive banner, since he had refused to join the Liberal-Conservative coalition of John Hart. George ran successfully for the federal Liberals in the Cariboo riding in the 1949 general election.

Margaret ran for the provincial legislature as a Socred without telling George. Although she lost, her campaign and her support for W.A.C. Bennett ruined George's political career and cemented her reputation for eccentricity. George lost his federal seat in 1953 to a Social Credit candidate in the wake of the embarrassment and retired from politics, returning to Lillooet (where the family regained the Bridge River-Lillooet News, which Margaret continued to edit and publish after his death in 1961.

== Political career ==
Preceded by Ernest Crawford Carson; Conservative (1928–1933)	MLA from Lillooet; Liberal; 1933–1941	Succeeded by Ernest Crawford Carson; Conservative (1941–1953)

=== Election results ===
==== 1933 ====
Lillooet riding

- Carson, Ernest Crawford (NPIG): 705 votes, 33.51%
- Murray, George Matheson (Lib.): 927, 44.06%
- Smith, John Morrison (CCF): 472, 22.43%
- Rejected ballots: 96
- Total votes: 2,104

==== 1937 ====
Lillooet riding

- Armstrong, Robert Purvis (CCF): 855, 28.92%
- Carson, Ernest Crawford (Cons.): 925, 31.29%
- Murray, George Matheson (Lib.): 1,176, 39.78%
- Rejected ballots: 57
- Total votes: 2,956

==== 1941 ====
Lillooet riding

- Archibald, Harry Grenfell (CCF): 841, 31.75%
- Carson, Ernest Crawford (Cons.): 1,017, 38.39%
- Murray, George Matheson (Lib.): 791, 29.86%
- Rejected ballots: 29
- Total votes: 2,649

==== 1945 ====
Lillooet riding

- Carson, Ernest Crawford (Coal.): 1,143, 51.42%
- Jacobsen, John Fossmark (SCA): 196, 8.82%
- Murray, George Matheson (Pro. Lib.): 61, 2.74%
- Radcliffe, Charles (CCF): 823, 37.02%
- Rejected ballots: 21
- Total votes: 2,223

==== 1949 ====
Cariboo federal riding

- Murray, George Matheson (Liberal): 7,330
- Irvine, William (CCF): 5,870

==== 1952 ====
Yale riding

- Gillis, John (Lib): 1,067, 33.9%
- Corbett, Irvine (SC): 1,024, 32.5%
- MacIsaac, Angus (CCF): 659, 20.9%
- Cherry, Bernard (PC): 338, 10.7%
- Murray, George Matheson (Ind.): 60, 1.9%
- Total votes: 3,148

==== 1953 ====
Cariboo federal riding

- Leboe, Bert Raymond (Social Credit): 5,562
- Murray, George Matheson (Liberal): 5,160
- Irvine, William (CCF): 4,314

== Legacy ==
Georgina Keddell, Murray's daughter (and biographer) said that if he were not eclipsed by the high political and publishing profile in politics and publishing of her mother, her father would be better known for his political career and as a historical figure.

Murray is commemorated on the British Columbia landscape with the Murray Range (in the Hart Ranges, on the southern edge of the Peace River Country) and with his wife by Mount Murray, in the heart of the Clear Range midway between Lillooet and Spences Bridge.

== See also ==
- Margaret Lally "Ma" Murray
- Politics of British Columbia

== Sources ==
- Elections British Columbia historical election data
- Elections Canada historical election data
