= Walter Henderson (politician) =

Canadian politician

Walter Clarence Henderson

Member of Parliament for Cariboo
- In office March 1958 – June 1962
- Preceded by: Bert Leboe
- Succeeded by: Bert Leboe

Personal details
- Born: 28 February 1891 Carberry, Manitoba, Canada
- Died: 20 September 1968 (aged 77)
- Party: Progressive Conservative
- Profession: farmer

Walter Clarence Henderson (28 February 1891 – 20 September 1968) was a Progressive Conservative party member of the House of Commons of Canada. He was born in Carberry, Manitoba and became a farmer by career.

He was elected at the Cariboo riding in the 1958 general election, defeating Social Credit incumbent Bert Leboe. Henderson served only one term, the 24th Canadian Parliament, before Leboe retook the riding in the 1962 election.
