= Corribee =

Sailing yacht model

L.O.A.	20 ft 9 in (6.32 m)
L.W.L.	16 ft 3 in (4.95 m)
Maximum beam	7 ft 2 in (2.18 m)
Draft (fin keel)	3 ft 0 in (0.91 m)
Draft (bilge keel)	2 ft 2 in (0.66 m)
Displacement (laden)	2,000 lb (910 kg)
Cabin Headroom	4 ft 8 in (1.42 m)
Engine (Outboard)	up to 7.5 hp
Engine (Inboard)	up to 12 hp

The Corribee is a model of sailing yacht with good sea keeping ability. It was in a Corribee that Ellen MacArthur sailed around Britain.

The boat has also made longer voyages across the Atlantic Ocean.

== Mark 1 Corribee ==
=== Mk 1, Clinker ===
The first Corribee was designed by Robert Tucker in 1964. Around 10 wooden Corribees were clinker built before production moved to the fibreglass Mk 1. The early Corribees have a centreboard which gives them a minimum draft of 1 ft 11 in (0.58 m), shallow even compared to the bilge-keeled later models which are themselves favoured for their shallow draft. With the centreboard lowered, the Mk 1 clinker Corribee draws 3 ft 3 in (1.0 m). Raised and lowered by means of a winch in the cockpit, the centreboard is housed in a small fin which protrudes from the hull of the boat, as such it does not intrude on the cabin floor.

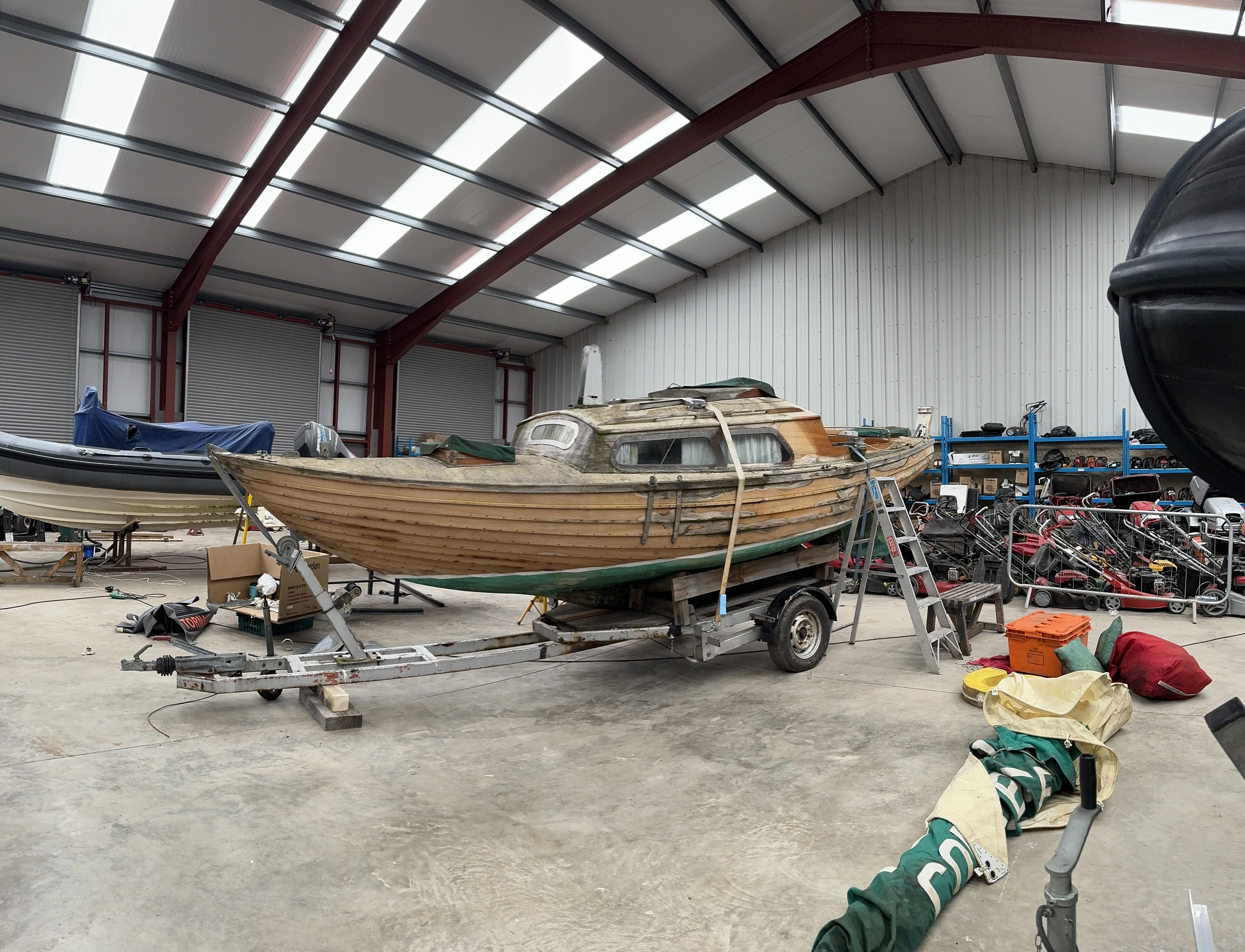

=== Corribee number 1 ===
In 1963 a Dragon-class enthusiast wanted a smaller boat with the feel of a Dragon, but with "a cruising ability all her own" and commissioned a design from Robert Tucker.

Robert Tucker's 1963 drawings bear the working name of "Sea Nymph"; the inspiration for her name came from fishing on the banks of Loch Corrib in Galway, Ireland.

Corribee was clinker-built in mahogany on oak at Tommy Mallon's yard by Loch Corrib in 1964 / 65. Corribee, sail number 1, eventually lent her name to the entire class of "Corribees".

Some 10 or so wooden clinker "Corribees" were built at Tommy Mallon's Yard before construction moved to Heron Marine at Herne Bay, who built a lighter plywood-planked version. Newbridge Boats in Dorset started to produce a GRP version called the "Corribee 21", later to be known as the "Mark I" Corribee, followed by several variants of the Mark II, then the Mark III.

In winter 1965 Corribee left Éire to be launched on the Medway - an undated surviving photograph (possibly from this time) shows her with a blue hull and white topsides.

Corribee's 21st Birthday was celebrated at Gravesend Sailing Club, presumably in 1986, photographs show her transom bearing the name "Corribee 1" and "GSC" (presumably "Gravesend Sailing Club") and she is then sporting an emerald green hull with cream topsides.

At some time in the 1990s, Corribee hit an underwater obstruction sailing on the Thames and sank. She was raised and put into storage in a shed on the Isle of Dogs.

She was due to be repaired, but had to be rescued from over-zealous restoration (including stripping all her paint, and stripping out of some of her decks and interior...) and she was moved to another storage shed.

Having found a new owner determined to save this classic boat, and the night before Corribee was due in Clare Lallow's Yard at Cowes for a complete restoration, the new owner found vandals had forced the door on the shed and lit two fires under her hull.

In spite of this, Laurie Borer and the team at Lallow's, and with help from the original drawings, restored her to her former glory. Corribee was relaunched by Jean Cook of the Corribee Owners' Association on Saturday 9 May 1998 from Lallow's Yard on the Medina, and was put up for sale in 2010.

Her new owner took her to the Lakes, but she was sold again in 2012. Her current owner asked Laurie Boarer at Lallow's to restore her to pristine condition again, and she has been stored undercover ever since. As she approaches her 60th birthday, this classic yacht needs some decking replacement and recommissioning. The boat has been purchased by Dr. Les Gornall in Northern Ireland for restoration. It was launched in Lough Neagh in 2025 out of Ballyronan Marina. Details of the restoration feature in water craft magazine edition numbers 175 and 176

=== Mk 1, Fibreglass ===
In the early 1970s, production of the Corribee moved to Newbridge Boats Ltd who built it in fibreglass. Known as the Newbridge "Corribee 21" in the brochure, she was sold as "a fin keel version of the original centreboard clinker boat". The Mk1 was also built as a twin keel boat which has a shallower draft than the fin keel version and has the advantage of staying upright if run aground or kept on a drying mooring. Compared to the later Mk 2 and Mk 3 Corribees, the Mk 1 has a few distinguishing features. The Mk 1 has a circular cover on the lazarette, the coachroof is wider than on later models and consequently has narrower side decks and more room below.

== List of Marks ==
- Mark 1 - still a common sight, recognisable by the timber cockpit coamings.
- Mark 2 - early - grp superstructure moulding.
- Mark 2 - late - similar, but more headroom in the cabin.
- Mark 3 - similar again, some small changes to the deck moulding.
- Corribee, junk rigged - the same superstructure as the standard Corribee.
- Coromandel - junk rigged, but with a different cabin moulding.

== Significant voyages ==
There have been a number of significant voyages completed in Corribees, including a number of circumnavigations of Great Britain and transatlantic crossings.

In 1978 Sgt. Alan Toone made a double transatlantic crossing in his Mk 2 Corribee, Corrie Bee completing the 8,467 mile round trip in 97 days. In 1983 Mike Spring, a paraplegic sailor, sailed single handed to Ponta Delgada, Azores in his Coromandel 3M Mariner. In 1995 Ellen MacArthur circumnavigated Great Britain via the Caledonian Canal in her Corribee, Iduna.

More recently Katie Miller emulated Ellen MacArthur's voyage in her Corribee, Elektra; she made the circumnavigation to raise finds for the Ellen MacArthur Trust. In recognition of this voyage she was awarded the 2006 Raymarine Young Sailor of the Year award.

As part of the 2008 Jester Azores Challenge Roger Taylor sailed from Plymouth to Praia da Vitória, Azores in his junk-rigged Corribee, Mingming, finishing in just under 21 days.

In the summer of 2008, Jack Daly completed his single handed circumnavigation of Great Britain via the Caledonian Canal in Padiwak; the voyage took him 12 weeks.

=== Voyage attempts ===
In 2006 Roger Taylor retired from the Plymouth to Newport Jester Challenge. He sailed his junk-rigged Corribee, Mingming to a point North East of the Azores, a total of 2,500 miles non-stop from Plymouth back to Burnham-on-Crouch, retiring only due to a slower than expected boat speed meaning he'd be at sea well into hurricane season, something Taylor described as "a risk too far".

In 2008 while Jack Daly was on his circumnavigation via the Caledonian Canal, Jonny Moore retired from a complete circumnavigation of Great Britain via the Pentland Firth in his Mk 2 Corribee Casulen II. His effort was still successful in raising money for the Kendal Sea Cadet Corps.
