= Fort Berens =

- Location of Fort Berens in British Columbia
- Coordinates: 50°41′20″N 121°55′00″W
- Country: Canada
- Province: British Columbia

Fort Berens, also spelled Fort Behrens, was a never-completed establishment of the Hudson's Bay Company on the Fraser River, located immediately across the river from today's town of Lillooet, British Columbia, Canada, in that province's central Fraser Canyon region. The post was designated and materials ordered for its construction in 1859, and was intended to serve as a supply outlet for the gold rush population of the area, which was the northern centre of gold-mining activity on the Fraser during the Fraser Canyon Gold Rush (1858–60). Although a plot of land was allocated, and building supplies were brought into the site, the post was never constructed and by 1861 orders from company headquarters decommissioned the post and the supplies were removed due to an absence of economic viability with the collapse of the rush. A "satellite" of Fort Kamloops, the post was named after Henry Hulse Berens, deputy Hudson's Bay Company governor 1856-58 and governor 1858-63. Immediately adjacent to the site that was to be Fort Berens, just to its north, were the boomtowns of Parsonville (or Parsonsville) and Marysville, which likewise disappeared by the end of the rush, though the Parsonville name remained in use as a tobacco press and farm for the locality for some time. A cable ferry connected the town of Lillooet and the three localities on the east bank of the Fraser. The route to the Cariboo known as the Old Cariboo Road (not to be confused with the Cariboo Road from Yale) started from the east bank and ran via Pavilion and Clinton to Alexandria.

== See also ==
- Fort Berens Winery
