= Alaska Highway News =

Weekly newspaper in BC, Canada

- Type: Weekly newspaper
- Owner: Todd Buck
- Founded: 1943; 83 years ago
- Language: English
- Headquarters: Fort St. John, British Columbia; V1J 3T8
- Circulation: 4,000 (as of 2024)
- ISSN: 1483-975X
- Website: thealaskahighwaynews.com

Alaska Highway News was the paper of record for Fort St. John, the North Peace River region, and Dawson Creek in northeastern British Columbia, Canada. Founded in 1943 by Margaret Lally "Ma" Murray, it was largely under corporate ownership for the rest of its 80-year-old publication history before being shuttered by Glacier Media in 2023. A year later the paper was purchased and relaunched by Todd Buck.

== History ==
Ma Murray, a Kansas native and wife of British Columbia politician and publisher George Matheson Murray, had already made a reputation as the firebrand editor of the Bridge River-Lillooet News in Lillooet, British Columbia, among other publications, when the Murrays came to see the Alaska Highway for themselves in 1940. They decided that Fort St. John, then a boomtown populated mostly by United States Army soldiers, was a good place to start a newspaper, and the weekly Alaska Highway News was born in 1943.

Murray became the "best-known, best-loved and also most cordially disliked person in Fort St. John" for her folksy and outspoken editorials, including attacks on the local power and telephone companies, and her solution to a town water shortage:

There has been a terrible waste of water in this small town. ... We sure as hell need to use less if we are going to have this modern convenience. To head off this catastrophe, only flush for No. 2, curtail bathing to the Saturday night tub, go back to the old washrag which could always remove a lot of B.O. if applied often enough. ...

She frequently ended her editorials "... and that's fer damshur!". Ma Murray also coined the Alaska Highway News' motto: "We're the only newspaper in the world that gives a tinker's damn about the North Peace."

By the turn of the 21st century, the paper had converted to a daily and ownership had passed to Hollinger Inc., the media empire of Conrad Black. Along with several other small British Columbia dailies, the Alaska Highway News was one of the last Hollinger properties to be sold, to Vancouver-based Glacier Ventures International, later called Glacier Media, in 2006. In 2014, the paper merged with another Glacier Media Group outlet, The Dawson Creek Daily News. The paper serves both the Fort St. John and Dawson Creek areas, as well as surrounding areas, including Fort Nelson. In March 2016 the frequency of the paper was switched to weekly.

In October 2023, the paper published its final edition. The closure created a news desert in the Peace River region, with local governments left with few alternative means of distributing its public notices as required under British Columbia law. But In April 2024, Todd Buck purchased the Alaska Highway News name and relaunched the paper. His plan was to deliver 4,000 eight-page tabloids bi-weekly to community boxes throughout Fort St. John.

== See also ==
- List of newspapers in Canada
