= Francis Jones Barnard =

Canadian politician

Francis Jones Barnard (18 February 1829 – 10 July 1889), often known as Frank Barnard Sr., was a British Columbia businessman and Member of Parliament in Canada from 1879 to 1887.

Most famously, Barnard was the founder of the B.X. Express freighting company ("Barnard's Express"), which was the main cartage and passenger services company on the Cariboo Road. His son, Sir Francis Stillman Barnard, later became the Lieutenant-Governor of British Columbia.

== Life ==
Though born in Quebec City, Barnard was a descendant of another Francis Barnard who settled in Deerfield, Massachusetts in 1642 and was one of that city's selectmen. The family business in Québec City was in hardware, but when his father died when he was twelve it fell upon him to support his mother and siblings.

In 1853 he married Ellen Stillman of Quebec City and in 1855 moved to Toronto, Canada West and started his own business. Unsuccessful in Toronto, he left his wife and young children there and emigrated to British Columbia in the spring of 1859 via the Panama Railway and San Francisco in 3rd class steerage. He arrived in Victoria at one of the peaks of gold rush frenzy in the early colony, and arrived in Yale with only a $5 gold piece in his pocket. He survived his first season there by chopping cordwood and delivering it on his back, and in staking and working a gold claim, and then selling it. He was appointed as the constable of Yale that summer. He was assigned to escort two prisoners to New Westminster and recaptured one at Hope after the prisoner had attempted to murder him with his own revolver after overpowering him.

In 1860 he became purser of the steam vessel Yale, which had been built by the businessmen of Yale to be the first steamer capable of reaching the Yale wharf, as all earlier vessels had only been able to voyage as far as Hope. In a joint contract with a Captain Powers, he also won a government contract to build the trail from Yale to Boston Bar. Doing well, between the roadbuilding and his job with the steamer, he sent to Ontario to bring out his wife and two small children. They arrived in Victoria in December, arriving on the mainland via the steamer Yale on its next-to-last voyage, as it was blown up just below Hope in a boiler accident on its next voyage. Though most others were killed, Barnard had been sitting at the dining table and was thrown out of the vessel by the explosion, and was rescued by local First Nations people. Shortly after he was awarded a contract to grade and "stamp" (the pre-asphalt equivalent of paving) Douglas Street, one of the principal streets of Yale.

It was his next enterprise, begun in the fall of 1860, that would grow to become the B.X. Express one of the most important companies in the early history of the Colony, and which would remain in business for decades. He began by carrying mail and newspapers, on foot, all the way from Yale to the goldfield towns of the Cariboo, a 760-mile roundtrip journey, charging $2 per letter and selling newspapers in the goldfields for $1 a copy. In 1861 and 1862 he also carried packages between Yale and New Westminster, a distance of 200 miles, and in 1862 established a one-horse pony express, with himself as sole rider, serving the Cariboo from Yale, where he met with services from New Westminster and Yale provided by Dietz & Nelson (one of the partners in which was the later Lieutenant-Governor Hugh Nelson and couriered reliably from there to Barkerville. On his return journeys, he became entrusted with shipments of gold dust, and managed to reliably and safely convey earnings from the goldfields to Yale despite the ever-present risk of robbery, in addition to the difficulties posed by distance, climate, and the difficult canyon and plateau trails.

With the completion of the first section of the Old Cariboo Road to Soda Creek in 1862, Barnard used his own acquired capital and found a backer to launch Barnard's Express and Stage Line with fourteen six-horse coaches and a famous team of "crack whips" to drive them, including legendary drivers Steve Tingley and Billy Ballou. The onset of the busiest phase of movement of miners and goods to and from the Cariboo Gold Rush began that year, and Barnard's new company prospered from a buys trade in services for passengers, freight, letters, newspapers and gold dust, and in 1864 was able to expand his business further with the purchase of more rolling stock and also in winning the government contract to carry the mail. Barnard was also able to encourage the government to end the gold escort with the result that his company's coaches, equipped with armed guardsmen, would be fully in charge of the movement of gold from the Cariboo to the Coast. In 1866 Barnard bought out Dietz and Nelson and so came into control of the bulk of business connecting Victoria to Barkerville, as he was now in control of shipments between Victoria and Yale as well as from Yale northwards. In 1868 he moved his family to Victoria, though himself continued to live in Yale, which was the focus of his business operations.

Barnard went into partnership with a J.C. Beedy to invest in the use of "road steamers", which resembled a railway steam engine) on the Cariboo Road and obtained a licence from the legislature to operate them for one year. Six were brought from their place of manufacture in Scotland but proved unusable on the steep grades and rough road surfaces of the colony, which they made even rougher thanks to their bulldozer-like treads, and all but two were sent back to Scotland, with Barnard absorbing heavy financial losses from the failed enterprise.

In 1874 Barnard won the government contract to build the Edmonton to Cache Creek section of the new transcontinental telegraph line (all telegraph communications between BC and the outside world had until then gone through the United States). This proved to be disastrous, as the government's plans were ill-conceived, changing the route twice, and Barnard was forced to sit on a large investment in steamboats, packtrains, supplies, wire and other supplies until 1874, when a new government (that of A.C. Elliott) cancelled the contract altogether, as its predecessor had commissioned the clearing of a right-of-way for telegraph and railway before even confirming the route. Barnard pursued a large claim for compensation, but the strain to his health from the losses incurred in this venture and the previous road-steamers misadventure contributed to a failing constitution. Barnard had his first paralyzing stroke in 1880, which left him invalid until his death on July 10, 1889.

== Political career ==
Barnard was first elected to the colonial legislature in 1866, as the member for Yale, in which position he served until 1870. Barnard, along with others such as John Robson, Hugh Nelson and Dr. Carrall, is considered to have been a "prime mover and father of confederation" in British Columbia, campaigning in the legislature and "on the stump". Nevertheless, he resigned just before Confederation for British Columbia was achieved due to the circumstances of a private members' bill he wished to see pass. Although active in politics by way of his business activities, Barnard did not re-enter electoral politics until 1879, when he was elected with a large majority to the House of Commons of Canada as a candidate of the Conservative Party of Canada, representing the Yale at the federal level and winning re-election twice. Because of his worsening health, he did not seek re-election in the general election of 1887 and in 1888 declined appointment to the Canadian Senate for the same reason.

== Family ==
Barnard had three children, the eldest Francis Stillman Barnard, also known as Frank Barnard, continued the family business operations and also entered politics, becoming an MP and eventually Lieutenant-Governor of British Columbia. His younger son George Henry Barnard sat as both an MP and a senator. His daughter Alice married John Andrew Mara, also notable as a pioneer as well as an MP, and another son George Henry Mara, of Victoria.

== See also ==
- Francis Stillman Barnard
- Barnard's Express
- Cariboo Road
