= Justin Leboe =

Canadian chef

Justin Leboe is a Canadian chef. He is the chef and proprietor of Pigeonhole and Model Milk. Model Milk has been included in Air Canada’s enRoute magazine’s best restaurants list every year since it opened in 2001. Leboe is the only chef to have been ranked in each of enRoute's top positions: Rush (2009); Model Milk (2012) and Pigeonhole – ranking #1 (2015). He is the Chef ambassador for Grow Calgary and in 2014 was featured in Eat North's Canadian Culinary Instagram feeds to follow.

== Awards and honors ==
Leboe has received the following awards: Pinnacle Award for Canadian Chef of the Year (2013) (2015); Canada's 100 Best: Canada's Most Innovative Chef: Globe and Mail (2016) and Best Chef in Bermuda.
