= Cariboo camels =

Camels which arrived in British Columbia, Canada, during the Cariboo Gold Rush

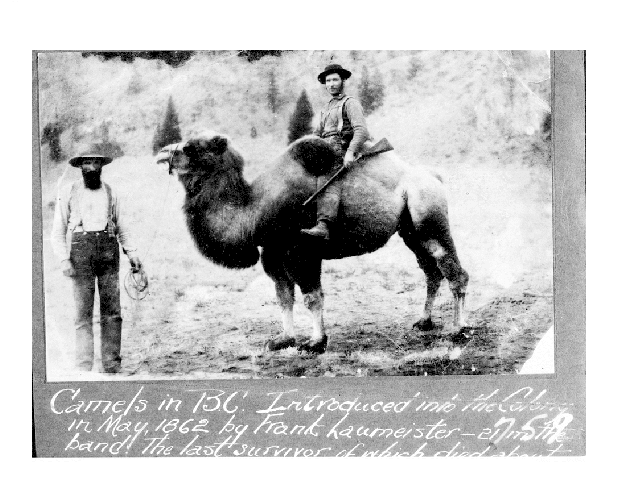

The Cariboo camels were a number of camels that arrived in British Columbia, Canada, as pack animals. The Bactrian camels were used on the Douglas Road and the Old Cariboo Road in 1862 and 1863 to haul freight during the Cariboo Gold Rush. Although the experiment was a failure, the Cariboo camels retained an almost legendary status in local popular culture.

== Origin ==
On March 1, 1862, an advertisement ran in the Victoria Colonist that offered camels for sale with an address where interested parties could go for further information. The camels were being sold by a San Francisco merchant, Otto Esche, who was probably inspired by the use of dromedary camels by the US Army Camel Corps. These Bactrian camels had worked in Arizona for rail construction and Esche had used them as pack animals during the California Gold Rush.

The editor of the Colonist ran a headline stating "The Camels are Coming!" and with the vivacious journalism typical of the day added, "and after they have been disposed of, a number of trained whales will be placed on the route between Victoria and the Stikine River carrying freight and inside passengers a la Jonah".

On March 15, the Colonist continued the story, reporting that Lillooet man, John Calbreath had purchased 23 of these animals for $300 a head and was planning to use them on the Old Cariboo Road to freight goods from Lillooet to Alexandria.

Calbreath was a representative of several other businessmen who were involved in this venture, Frank Laumeister, Adam Heffley and Henry Ingram. However, as the story unfolded, it was Laumeister whose name became the most associated with the Cariboo camels. Both Calbreath and Laumeister would later become involved in the Cassiar Gold Rush, owning stores and operating freighting businesses, although no camels would have any part of these ventures.

== Arrival of camels ==
The camels arrived in Victoria on April 15 on the steamship Hermann. They were in the city and remained there until the 4th of May and were the subject of much local interest, as well as more headlines and editorials. One baby camel was born during their stay, and another escaped with its mother into the wilds of Vancouver Island and wouldn't be seen until that fall near Cadboro Bay.

The others were loaded onto a barge and towed by William Moore's Flying Dutchman to New Westminster and on to Port Douglas. By the middle of May they were working on the Pemberton Portage on the Douglas Road. By May 24 they were on their way to Lillooet to work closer to the gold fields.

At first, the camels seemed to be performing well. They could carry up to 500-600 pounds, which was twice what mules could carry, and they were good foragers. However, their soft feet were easily torn up by the harsh terrain of the Cariboo Road and canvas boots had to be made for them.

By the end of June, the first camel train had left Lillooet for Alexandria and the papers reported that one camel was killed when it slid off a cliff into the Pavilion Creek. Soon more reports came in from the Cariboo, mostly complaints from the stagecoach drivers and the miners. Stage horses were terrified at the very sight of camels and even the best trained of them would bolt upon encountering the camels on the road. Furthermore, the camels' varied diet even included pants, shirts, hats and bars of soap.

One report mentioned Matthew Baillie Begbie's experience with the camel train and how his mount dashed off into the wilderness with the helpless judge clinging to the saddle. He would despise camels for the rest of his life.

By October, the Colonist reported that a dozen camels had survived their first season and were wintering at Quesnel Forks.

== Decline ==
In May 1863, the camels were back at Lillooet, but after creating more headlines and occasioning more threats of legal action from outraged and exasperated stage drivers, Frank Laumeister retired the camel train for good. What became of the remaining camels has always been a subject of much debate and apocryphal stories. Several were taken in at ranches, either as pets or as working stock, while another was mistaken for a grizzly bear and shot by miner, John Morris, who would forever be known as "Grizzly" Morris. The camel didn't go to waste but ended up on the menu at a hotel near Beaver Lake as a dinner special called "Grizzly's Bear". Unconfirmed camel sightings were reported all over the Cariboo and Central British Columbia for decades.

== Last known survivor ==
The last notable surviving camel was known as "The Lady" and lived at a ranch in Grand Prairie, British Columbia, now Westwold. She died sometime between 1896 and 1905. The Lady is the subject of the only known photograph of the Cariboo camels (shown above). She is shown with W.H. Smith.

== Places named for the Cariboo camels ==
- Camelsfoot Range
- Bridge of the 23 Camels in Lillooet

== See also ==
- Camel train
- Fort Berens Winery
- Paracamelus
- Camelops
