= Francis Stillman Barnard =

Canadian governor (1856–1934)

The Honourable Sir Francis Stillman Barnard KCMG
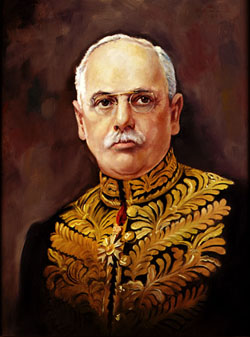
- Sir Francis Stillman Barnard

10th Lieutenant Governor of British Columbia
- In office December 5, 1914 – December 9, 1919
- Monarch: George V
- Governors General: The Duke of Connaught and Strathearn; The Duke of Devonshire
- Premier: Richard McBride; William John Bowser; Harlan Carey Brewster; John Oliver
- Preceded by: Thomas Wilson Paterson
- Succeeded by: Edward Gawler Prior

Member of the Canadian Parliament for Cariboo
- In office November 22, 1888 – June 23, 1896
- Preceded by: James Reid
- Succeeded by: Riding dissolved

Personal details
- Born: May 16, 1856 Toronto, Canada West
- Died: April 11, 1936 (aged 79) Victoria, British Columbia, Canada
- Party: Liberal-Conservative
- Spouse: Martha Amelia Sophia Loewen (m. 1883)
- Relations: Francis Jones Barnard (father)
- Occupation: businessman, parliamentarian
- Profession: Politician

Sir Francis Stillman Barnard KCMG (May 16, 1856 – April 11, 1936) was a Canadian parliamentarian and the tenth Lieutenant Governor of British Columbia. Barnard is often referred to as Frank Barnard, as was his father Francis Jones Barnard, who as the founder of Barnard's Express, was one of BC's more notable pioneer entrepreneurs.

== Early life ==
Stillman was born on May 16, 1856, in Toronto, Canada West. In 1860, he moved with his mother to Victoria, Colony of Vancouver Island, where his father had preceded them by a year. There, he attended the Collegiate School from 1866 to 1870 after which, he was sent to Hellmuth College in London, Ontario, to continue his education. In 1873, he returned to British Columbia where he assisted his father in the operation of the family business, the B.C. Express Company a.k.a. Barnard's Express. In 1880, he was appointed as manager of the company when his father's health turned for the worse. He continued in this position until 1888, when he resigned to successfully run for the Cariboo seat in the House of Commons. Politically, he was a "liberal conservative", as Stillman was an ardent supporter of John A. Macdonald, with whom he campaigned and worked actively for the rapid settlement and development of the province.

== Accomplishments ==
In addition to his primary role in the B.X. Express, Barnard was president and majority shareholder of Victoria Transfer Co. Ltd. and its counterpart, Vancouver Transfer Co. Ltd. He was director and secretary of the Vancouver Improvement Company, and also a director of the Hastings Sawmill Company, the British Columbia Milling and Mining Company, and of the Selkirk Mining and Smelting Company. He was also a Victoria City Councillor in 1886 and 1887. He was a member of the Union Club in Victoria, and of the Rideau Club in Ottawa. From 1914 to 1919, he was the Lieutenant Governor of British Columbia. He was knighted in 1919 by Edward, Prince of Wales.

== Personal life ==
In 1883 he married Martha Amelia Sophia Loewen, (1866–1942) whose father was prominent in the flour & distillery business. In married life, Sir Barnard resided at Duval Cottage, Victoria.
