= Bridge of the Twenty-Three Camels =

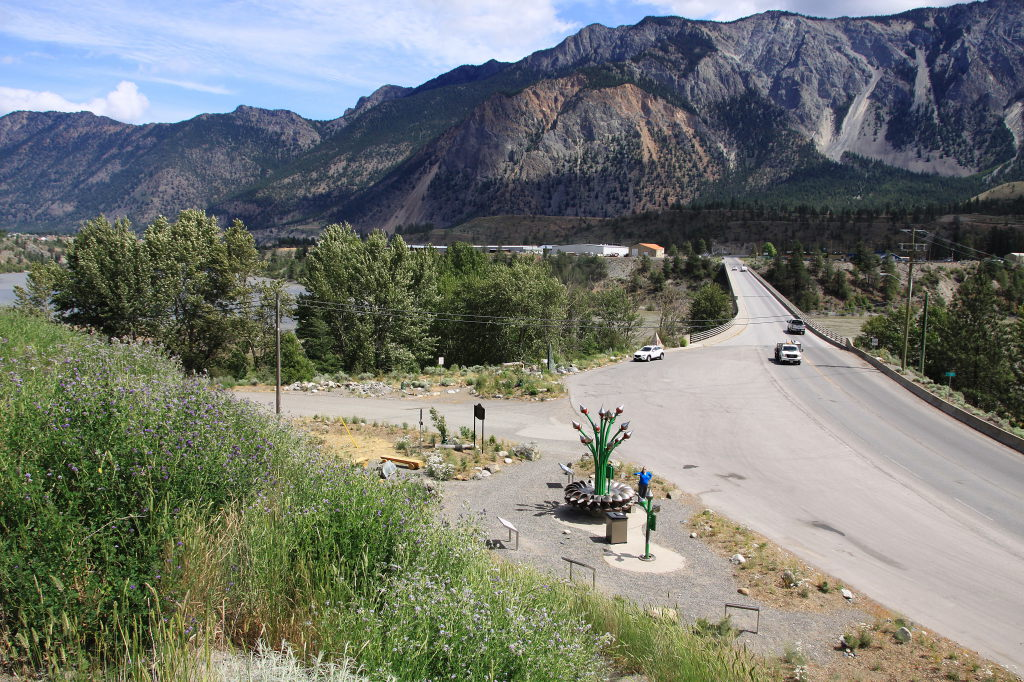
- Coordinates: 50°41′02″N 121°55′44″W
- Carries: Two lanes of British Columbia Highway 99
- Crosses: Fraser River
- Locale: Lillooet, British Columbia
- Owner: British Columbia Ministry of Transportation and Infrastructure

Characteristics
- Total length: 341.50 m
- No. of spans: 5

History
- Opened: June 26, 1981

Bridge of the Twenty-Three Camels is the official name of the highway bridge over the Fraser River at Lillooet, British Columbia, Canada, on BC Highway 99. It replaced the older 1913-vintage Lillooet Suspension Bridge, just upstream, which had no highway designation but connected the town to BC Highway 12, a designation which today only refers to the Lillooet-Lytton highway but, until the extension of the 99 designation from Pemberton, also included the Lillooet-Cache Creek highway.

The name references the Cariboo camels imported to the region to haul freight in 1862. As something of a joke on this name, the crossing of the Yalakom River at Moha, a small concrete truss span, sports the sign "Bridge of the Twenty-Three Chipmunks".

The bridge was opened on June 26, 1981 by Transportation and Highways Minister Alex Fraser and Thomas Waterland, Minister of Forests and the MLA for Yale-Lillooet.

== See also ==
- List of crossings of the Fraser River
- List of bridges in Canada
- Lytton Ferry
- Pavilion Ferry
- Low Bar Ferry
- Cariboo camels
