= Cariboo (federal electoral district) =

Former federal electoral district in British Columbia, Canada

British Columbia electoral district

Defunct federal electoral district
- Legislature: House of Commons
- District created: 1914
- District abolished: 1966
- First contested: 1917
- Last contested: 1965

Cariboo was a federal electoral district in British Columbia, Canada, that was represented in the House of Commons of Canada from 1871 to 1892; and again from 1917 to 1968.

== District history ==
This riding was first created as Cariboo District following British Columbia's admission into the Canadian Confederation in 1871. The name was changed to "Cariboo" in 1872, and existed in this form until it was abolished in 1892 when it was amalgamated into the new riding of Yale—Cariboo. In 1914, Yale—Cariboo was redistributed and Yale and Cariboo were separate ridings once again, though with smaller areas than before. The Cariboo riding lasted until 1966. The succession of ridings for the Cariboo area since then has been:

- Kamloops—Cariboo (1966–1976)
- Cariboo—Chilcotin (1976–2003)
- Cariboo—Prince George (2003– )
- Kamloops—Thompson—Cariboo (2004– )

The Chilcotin region of the riding, west of the Fraser River, was from 1966 to 1976 part of the Coast Chilcotin riding.

The original form of the riding was the whole of the Cariboo Plateau and both Cariboo and Lillooet Land Districts. Its southern boundary was on the northern edge of the New Westminster riding, and later the Burrard riding, then the North Vancouver riding, with near-coastal localities such as Pemberton, Squamish, Britannia Beach and Port Douglas all politically part of "Cariboo".

Under the Representation Act of 1892, the constituencies of Yale and Cariboo were united to form Yale—Cariboo. In 1914 that riding was broken up and the Yale and Cariboo riding-names were restored, although the new constituencies were considerably smaller than before. The restored Yale riding included the Boundary Country around Grand Forks and Greenwood, but the Kootenay was now a separate riding and the town of Yale itself was not in the restored Yale riding, but in the new riding of Westminster District. The first election using the new boundaries was in 1917. "Government" and "Opposition" were used during the wartime campaign to designate the governing Conservatives vs the Opposition Liberals.

A major redistribution in 1947 took away the southern half of the Cariboo district, with a southern boundary at 52 degrees 30 minutes north, just excluding Williams Lake and the south bank of Quesnel Lake. The rest of the riding extended to the Little Rancheria River and the border with Yukonand the Northwest Territories, therefore including the Omineca, Prince George and Peace River districts.

The Cariboo electoral district was abolished in 1966. Successor ridings were:

- Coast Chilcotin (1966–1976)
- Kamloops—Cariboo (1966–1976)
- Prince George—Peace River (1966–1976)
- Skeena (1914–2003)

== Members of Parliament ==
Cariboo
Parliament	Years	Member	Party
Riding created from Cariboo District
2nd	1872–1874	Joshua Spencer Thompson	Liberal–Conservative
3rd	1874–1878	Joshua Spencer Thompson	Liberal–Conservative
4th	1878–1880†	Joshua Spencer Thompson	Liberal–Conservative
4th	1881–1882	James Reid	Liberal–Conservative
5th	1882–1887	James Reid	Liberal–Conservative
6th	1887–1888	James Reid	Liberal–Conservative
6th	1888–1891	Frank Stillman Barnard	Conservative
7th	1891–1896	Frank Stillman Barnard	Conservative
Riding dissolved into Yale—Cariboo
Riding re-created from Yale—Cariboo
13th	1917–1921	Frederick John Fulton	Government (Unionist)
14th	1921–1925	Thomas George McBride	Progressive
15th	1925–1926	John Fraser	Conservative
16th	1926–1930	John Fraser	Conservative
17th	1930–1935	John Fraser	Conservative
18th	1935–1940	James Gray Turgeon	Liberal
19th	1940–1945	James Gray Turgeon	Liberal
20th	1945–1949	William Irvine	Co-operative Commonwealth
21st	1949–1953	George Matheson Murray	Liberal
22nd	1953–1957	Bert Leboe	Social Credit
23rd	1957–1958	Bert Leboe	Social Credit
24th	1958–1962	Walter Henderson	Progressive Conservative
25th	1962–1963	Bert Leboe	Social Credit
26th	1963–1965	Bert Leboe	Social Credit
27th	1965–1968	Bert Leboe	Social Credit
Riding dissolved into Coast Chilcotin, Kamloops—Cariboo, Prince George—Peace River and Skeena

== Election results ==
=== Cariboo, 1917–1968 ===
1965 Canadian federal election
Party	Candidate	Votes	%	±%
Social Credit	Bert Leboe	12,344	37.59	+7.13
Progressive Conservative	Peter Runkle	7,756	23.62	–3.48
Liberal	Art McClellan	7,144	21.76	–6.12
New Democratic	Fred Atkinson	5,594	17.04	+2.48
Total valid votes		32,838	99.31	
Total rejected ballots		229	0.69	+0.17
Turnout		33,067	67.50	–4.02
Eligible voters		48,986		
Social Credit hold		Swing		+6.63
Source: Library of Parliament

1963 Canadian federal election
Party	Candidate	Votes	%	±%
Social Credit	Bert Leboe	9,335	30.46	+0.03
Liberal	Charles E. Graham	8,543	27.88	+0.04
Progressive Conservative	Peter Runkle	8,304	27.10	+2.45
New Democratic	William Marshall Close	4,461	14.56	–2.52
Total valid votes		30,643	99.47	
Total rejected ballots		162	0.53	–0.35
Turnout		30,805	71.52	+0.92
Eligible voters		43,073		
Social Credit hold		Swing		+0.03
Source: Library of Parliament

1962 Canadian federal election
Party	Candidate	Votes	%	±%
Social Credit	Bert Leboe	8,435	30.44	+3.53
Liberal	Charles E. Graham	7,715	27.84	+12.65
Progressive Conservative	Walter Henderson	6,830	24.65	–18.55
New Democratic	Ken Rutherford	4,732	17.08	+2.37
Total valid votes		27,712	99.12	
Total rejected ballots		246	0.88	+0.03
Turnout		27,958	70.60	+3.54
Eligible voters		39,599		
Social Credit gain from Progressive Conservative		Swing		+11.04
Source: Library of Parliament

1958 Canadian federal election
Party	Candidate	Votes	%	±%
Progressive Conservative	Walter Henderson	9,327	43.20	+21.52
Social Credit	Bert Leboe	5,811	26.91	–15.71
Liberal	Gordon Douglas Bryant	3,279	15.19	–6.45
Co-operative Commonwealth	William Marshall Close	3,175	14.71	+0.64
Total valid votes		21,592	99.15	
Total rejected ballots		186	0.85	–0.03
Turnout		21,778	67.06	–1.41
Eligible voters		32,474		
Progressive Conservative gain from Social Credit		Swing		+18.62
Source: Library of Parliament

1957 Canadian federal election
Party	Candidate	Votes	%	±%
Social Credit	Bert Leboe	8,292	42.62	+5.63
Progressive Conservative	William Dow Ferry	4,217	21.68	–
Liberal	Angus Carmichael	4,208	21.63	–12.69
Co-operative Commonwealth	William Marshall Close	2,737	14.07	–14.62
Total valid votes		19,454	99.12	
Total rejected ballots		173	0.88	–0.36
Turnout		19,627	68.47	+9.60
Eligible voters		28,664		
Social Credit hold		Swing		+9.16
Source: Library of Parliament

1953 Canadian federal election
Party	Candidate	Votes	%	±%
Social Credit	Bert Leboe	5,562	36.99	–
Liberal	George Matheson Murray	5,160	34.32	–21.21
Co-operative Commonwealth	William Irvine	4,314	28.69	–15.78
Total valid votes		15,036	98.76	
Total rejected ballots		189	1.24	+0.50
Turnout		15,225	58.87	–10.92
Eligible voters		25,860		
Social Credit gain from Liberal		Swing		+26.39
Source: Library of Parliament

1949 Canadian federal election
Party	Candidate	Votes	%	±%
Liberal	George Matheson Murray	7,330	55.53	+21.40
Co-operative Commonwealth	William Irvine	5,870	44.47	+3.77
Total valid votes		13,200	99.26	
Total rejected ballots		98	0.74	–0.12
Turnout		13,298	69.79	–12.90
Eligible voters		19,054		
Liberal gain from Co-operative Commonwealth		Swing		+12.58
Source: Library of Parliament

1945 Canadian federal election
Party	Candidate	Votes	%	±%
Co-operative Commonwealth	William Irvine	5,773	40.70	+3.11
Liberal	James Gray Turgeon	4,841	34.13	–10.82
Progressive Conservative	Thomas Jamieson	2,490	17.56	+0.10
Social Credit	Volney Lane Phillips	1,080	7.61	–
Total valid votes		14,184	99.14	
Total rejected ballots		123	0.86	+0.09
Turnout		14,307	82.69	+5.36
Eligible voters		17,302		
Co-operative Commonwealth gain from Liberal		Swing		+6.97
Source: Library of Parliament

1940 Canadian federal election
Party	Candidate	Votes	%	±%
Liberal	James Gray Turgeon	6,063	44.95	+4.06
Co-operative Commonwealth	William Irvine	5,070	37.59	+1.37
National Government	Frederick Herbert Stephens	2,354	17.45	–0.49
Total valid votes		13,487	99.23	
Total rejected ballots		104	0.77	–0.71
Turnout		13,591	77.33	+8.39
Eligible voters		17,575		
Liberal hold		Swing		+2.72
Source: Library of Parliament

1935 Canadian federal election
Party	Candidate	Votes	%	±%
Liberal	James Gray Turgeon	4,222	40.89	–8.13
Co-operative Commonwealth	John McInnis	3,740	36.22	–
Conservative	John Fraser	1,853	17.95	–33.03
Reconstruction	Frederick Clarke	510	4.94	–
Total valid votes		10,325	98.52	
Total rejected ballots		155	1.48	+1.48
Turnout		10,480	68.94	–6.60
Eligible voters		15,202		
Liberal gain from Conservative		Swing		+20.58
Source: Library of Parliament

1930 Canadian federal election
Party	Candidate	Votes	%	±%
Conservative	John Fraser	8,548	50.98	–2.02
Liberal	Henry George Thomas Perry	8,220	49.02	+2.02
Total valid votes		16,768	100.00	
Total rejected ballots		–		
Turnout		16,768	75.54	+5.01
Eligible voters		22,197		
Conservative hold		Swing		–2.02
Source: Library of Parliament

1926 Canadian federal election
Party	Candidate	Votes	%	±%
Conservative	John Fraser	7,200	53.00	–0.75
Liberal	Joseph Graham	6,386	47.00	–
Total valid votes		13,586	100.00	
Total rejected ballots		–		
Turnout		13,586	70.53	+3.66
Eligible voters		19,262		
Conservative hold		Swing		–
Source: Library of Parliament

1925 Canadian federal election
Party	Candidate	Votes	%	±%
Conservative	John Fraser	6,430	53.75	+18.69
Progressive	Thomas George McBride	5,534	46.26	–18.69
Total valid votes		11,964	100.00	
Total rejected ballots		–		
Turnout		11,964	66.87	–2.05
Eligible voters		17,892		
Conservative gain from Progressive		Swing		+18.69
Source: Library of Parliament

1921 Canadian federal election
Party	Candidate	Votes	%	±%
Progressive	Thomas George McBride	7,185	64.94	–
Conservative	John Thomas Robinson	3,879	35.06	–
Total valid votes		11,064	100.00	
Total rejected ballots		–		
Turnout		11,064	68.91	–30.69
Eligible voters		16,055		
Progressive gain from Government (Unionist)		Swing		–
Source: Library of Parliament

1917 Canadian federal election
Party	Candidate	Votes	%	±%
Government (Unionist)	Frederick John Fulton	6,010	68.19	–
Opposition	Raymond Findlay Leighton	2,804	31.81	–
Total valid votes		8,814	100.00	
Total rejected ballots		–		
Turnout		8,814	99.60	
Eligible voters		8,849		
Government (Unionist) notional gain		Swing		–
This riding was re-created from Yale—Cariboo, which elected a Conservative in the previous election.
Source: Library of Parliament

=== Cariboo, 1872–1896 ===
1891 Canadian federal election
Party	Candidate	Votes	%	±%
Conservative	Francis Stillman Barnard	223	53.48	+14.22
Liberal	Hugh Watt	194	46.52	–
Total valid votes		417	100.00	
Total rejected ballots		–		
Turnout		417	58.40	–
Eligible voters		714		
Conservative hold		Swing		–
Source: Library of Parliament

Canadian federal by-election, November 22, 1888 On the appointment of James Reid to the Senate
Party	Candidate	Votes	%	±%
Conservative	Francis Stillman Barnard	117	39.26	–18.74
Independent	Robert McLeese	95	31.88	–
Independent	Mr. Rogers	86	28.86	–
Total valid votes		298	100.00	
Total rejected ballots		–		
Turnout		298	–	–
Eligible voters				
Conservative gain from Liberal–Conservative		Swing		–
Rogers' first name does not appear in the historical records.
Source: Library of Parliament

1887 Canadian federal election
Party	Candidate	Votes	%	±%
Liberal–Conservative	James Reid	145	58.00	–
Liberal	George Ferguson	105	42.00	–
Total valid votes		250	100.00	
Total rejected ballots		–		
Turnout		250	51.12	–
Eligible voters		489		
Liberal–Conservative hold		Swing		–
Source: Library of Parliament

1882 Canadian federal election
Party	Candidate	Votes	%	±%
Liberal–Conservative	James Reid	acclaimed		
Source: Library of Parliament

Canadian federal by-election, March 31, 1881 On the death of Joshua Spencer Thompson, December 20, 1880
Party	Candidate	Votes	%	±%
Liberal–Conservative	James Reid	179	42.32	–
Unknown	Mr. Monroe	104	24.59	–
Unknown	Mr. Ball	78	18.44	–
Unknown	Archibald Greig	62	14.66	–
Total valid votes		423	100.00	
Total rejected ballots		–		
Turnout		423	–	–
Eligible voters		–		
Liberal–Conservative hold		Swing		–
Neither Ball's nor Monroe's first names are given in the historical records.
Source: Library of Parliament

1878 Canadian federal election
Party	Candidate	Votes	%	±%
Liberal–Conservative	Joshua Spencer Thompson	acclaimed		
Source: Library of Parliament

1874 Canadian federal election
Party	Candidate	Votes	%	±%
Liberal–Conservative	Joshua Spencer Thompson	192	82.76	–
Unknown	S. Walker	40	17.24	–
Total valid votes		232	100.00	
Total rejected ballots		–		
Turnout		232	50.00	–
Eligible voters		464		
Liberal–Conservative hold		Swing		–
Source: Library of Parliament

1872 Canadian federal election
Party	Candidate	Votes	%
Liberal–Conservative	Joshua Spencer Thompson	acclaimed	
Source: Library of Parliament

== See also ==
- List of Canadian electoral districts
- Historical federal electoral districts of Canada
