= Bert Leboe =

Canadian politician

Bert Raymond Leboe
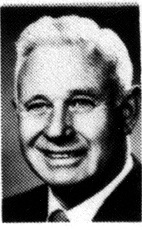

Member of Parliament for Cariboo
- In office August 1953 – March 1958

Member of Parliament for Cariboo
- In office June 1962 – June 1968

Personal details
- Born: 13 August 1909 Bawlf, Alberta, Canada
- Died: 1 December 1980 (aged 71) Kelowna, British Columbia, Canada
- Party: Social Credit
- Spouse(s): Clarissa Mae Alderson (m. 20 June 1936)
- Profession: lumberman

Bert Raymond Leboe (13 August 1909 – 11 December 1980) was a Social Credit party member of the House of Commons of Canada. Born in Bawlf, Alberta, he was a lumberman by career, becoming director of Leboe Brothers Sawmills Ltd.

He was first elected at the Cariboo riding in the 1953 general election and re-elected there in 1957. After a defeat in the 1958 federal election, Leboe returned to Parliament by winning the Cariboo riding in 1962, then was re-elected in 1963 and 1965. After the Cariboo riding was eliminated in a late-1960s electoral boundary realignment, Leboe was a candidate at Prince George—Peace River in the 1968 election where he was defeated by Robert Borrie of the Liberal party.
