= James Pearson Shaw =

Canadian politician

James Pearson Shaw (January 24, 1867 – December 9, 1946) was a political figure in British Columbia. He represented Kamloops in the Legislative Assembly of British Columbia from 1909 to 1916 as a Conservative.

He was born in Glanbrook Township, Ontario, the son of Thomas Shaw and Mary Jane Choate, and was educated in Brant County and in Brantford. He taught school for two years in Brant County. Shaw came to British Columbia in 1888. In 1890, he married Nellie Wilson. Shaw moved to Shuswap in 1894. He was a justice of the peace, served as secretary-treasurer for the Shuswap school board and was president of the Kamloops Agricultural Association from 1903 to 1904. Shaw was defeated by Frederick William Anderson when he ran for reelection to the assembly in 1916. He was named by the province to the Royal Commission on Indian Affairs that was formed in 1913. He died in Kamloops at the age of 79.
