= Bud Smith (British Columbia politician) =

Canadian politician

Member of the British Columbia Legislative Assembly for Kamloops
- In office October 22, 1986 – October 17, 1991 Serving with Claude Richmond
- Preceded by: Rafe Mair
- Succeeded by: Arthur Charbonneau

Attorney General of British Columbia
- In office July 6, 1988 – July 13, 1990
- Premier: Bill Vander Zalm
- Preceded by: Brian Smith
- Succeeded by: Russell Fraser

Personal details
- Born: May 14, 1946 (age 79) Kamloops, British Columbia
- Party: Social Credit
- Profession: lawyer

Stuart Douglas Boland "Bud" Smith (born May 14, 1946) is a lawyer, businessman and former politician in British Columbia. He represented Kamloops in the Legislative Assembly of British Columbia from 1986 to 1991 as a Social Credit member, serving alongside Claude Richmond in a dual-member district.

== Early life ==
Smith was born in Kamloops, British Columbia, the son of John Alan Ivan Smith Boland Smith and Anne Margaret Bain. In 1970, he received his B.A. from the University of Victoria, and in 1974, he received his L.L.B. from the University of British Columbia. In 1972, he married Daphne Marguerite Minnes.

== Career ==
In 1986, Smith ran for the leadership of the Social Credit Party. He placed third on the first ballot, but slipped to fourth on the second. Shortly after the second ballot, he withdrew and endorsed eventual victor Bill Vander Zalm. Smith's endorsement came as a surprise; he had been expected to lend his support to the "stop Vander Zalm" movement. Smith denied any secret deal and said he was following the will of the delegates, who wanted party renewal. His support was viewed as critical to Vander Zalm's landslide victory. When Vander Zalm assembled his initial cabinet, Smith was notably left out.

On July 6, 1988, Smith was named Attorney General. He resigned from cabinet in July 1990 after the release of several recordings where he appeared to be interfering in criminal proceeding against former tourism minister Bill Reid. Smith had been attempting to discredit one of the lawyers involved. The tapes were handed to the RCMP for investigation. Until this scandal, Smith was viewed as a potential successor to Vander Zalm.

On December 13, 1990, he rejoined cabinet as Minister of Regional and Economic Development. He was dropped from the cabinet by new Premier Rita Johnston in April 1991.

After retiring from politics, Smith served on the board of several crown corporations, including Canada Post and the Royal British Columbia Museum.
