= List of members of the Canadian House of Commons with military service (F) =

| Name | Elected party | Constituency | Elected date | Military service |
|---|---|---|---|---|
| Samuel Factor | Liberal | Toronto West Centre | July 30, 1928 | Canadian Army |
| Francis Fairey | Liberal | Victoria | August 10, 1953 | Canadian Army |
| Gordon Fairweather | Progressive Conservative | Royal | June 18, 1962 | Royal Canadian Navy (1941–1945) |
| Frank Fane | Progressive Conservative | Vegreville | March 31, 1958 | Canadian Army |
| Gaspard Fauteux | Liberal | St. Mary | February 9, 1942 | Canadian Army |
| Julian Harcourt Ferguson | Progressive Conservative | Simcoe North | June 11, 1945 | Canadian Army |
| Thomas Roberts Ferguson | Conservative | Cardwell | September 20, 1867 | Militia (1869–1873) |
| Gladstone Mansfield Ferrie | Liberal | Mackenzie | June 27, 1949 | Canadian Army |
| Robert Emmett Finn | Liberal | Halifax | December 4, 1922 | Militia (1900-) |
| Eugène Fiset | Liberal | Rimouski | September 2, 1924 | Militia (1899–1900) |
| Douglas Mason Fisher | Cooperative Commonwealth Federation | Port Arthur | June 10, 1957 | Canadian Army (1941–1945) |
| Stuart A. Fleming | Progressive Conservative | Okanagan—Revelstoke | March 31, 1958 | Royal Canadian Air Force (1941–1945) |
| William Kingston Flesher | Conservative | Grey East | October 12, 1872 | Militia (1867–1880) |
| Patrick Flynn | Liberal | Kingston | July 8, 1974 | Royal Canadian Navy (1940–1945) |
| James Fraser Forbes | Anti-Confederate | Queens | September 20, 1867 | Militia |
| James Moffat Forgie | Liberal | Renfrew North | August 10, 1953 | Militia (1914–1919), Canadian Army (1939–1945) |
| Edmond Fortier | Liberal | Lotbinière | January 25, 1900 | Militia |
| Louis Fortin | Progressive Conservative | Montmagny—L'Islet | September 29, 1958 | Canadian Army (1939–1945) |
| George William Fowler | Conservative | Kings | November 7, 1900 | Canadian Army |
| Cyril Lloyd Francis | Liberal | Carleton | April 8, 1963 | Royal Canadian Air Force (1941–1945) |
| Evan Eugene Fraser | Unionist | Welland | December 17, 1917 | Canadian Army (1917–1918) |
| John Allen Fraser | Progressive Conservative | Vancouver South | October 30, 1972 | Canadian Army (1950–1962) |
| John L. "Jack" Frazer | Reform | Saanich—Gulf Islands | October 25, 1993 | Royal Canadian Air Force (1951–1968), Canadian Forces Air Command (1968–1987) |
| Edmund Davie Fulton | Progressive Conservative | Kamloops | June 11, 1945 | Canadian Army (1940–1945) |
