= Kamloops—Shuswap =

Former federal electoral district in British Columbia, Canada

British Columbia electoral district

Defunct federal electoral district
- Legislature: House of Commons
- District created: 1976
- District abolished: 1987
- First contested: 1979
- Last contested: 1984

Kamloops — Shuswap was a federal electoral district in British Columbia, Canada, that was represented in the House of Commons of Canada from 1979 to 1988. This riding was created in 1976 from parts of Fraser Valley East, Kamloops—Cariboo and Okanagan—Kootenay ridings.

It was abolished in 1987 when it was redistributed into Kamloops and Okanagan—Shuswap ridings.

It consisted of:

- the part of the Thompson-Nicola Regional District lying east of Electoral Areas E and I and north of Electoral Area M; and
- the part of the Columbia-Shuswap Regional District lying west of Electoral Area B.

== Members of Parliament ==
Parliament	Years	Member	Party
Riding created from Fraser Valley East, Kamloops—Cariboo and Okanagan—Kootenay
31st	1979–1980	Donald Niel Cameron	Progressive Conservative
32nd	1980–1984	Nelson Riis	New Democratic
33rd	1984–1988	Nelson Riis	New Democratic
Riding dissolved into Kamloops and Okanagan—Shuswap

== Election results ==
=== 1984 ===
1984 Canadian federal election
Party	Candidate	Votes	%	±%
New Democratic	Nelson Riis	30,512	54.08	+14.97
Progressive Conservative	Robert Michael Latta	20,500	36.33	+1.27
Liberal	Patricia Anne Wallace	4,675	8.29	–17.03
Rhinoceros	A. Dean Purych	353	0.63	+0.11
Green	Connie Harris	216	0.38	–
Confederation of Regions	E. Neville Houghton	102	0.18	–
Independent	Leon Mikulin	65	0.12	–
Total valid votes		56,423	99.77	
Total rejected ballots		132	0.23	+0.07
Turnout		56,555	81.94	+10.44
Eligible voters		69,022		
New Democratic hold		Swing		+8.12
Source: Elections Canada

=== 1980 ===
1980 Canadian federal election
Party	Candidate	Votes	%	±%
New Democratic	Nelson Riis	17,896	39.10	+11.57
Progressive Conservative	Donald Niel Cameron	16,046	35.06	–8.68
Liberal	Malcolm Bates (Mack) Bryson	11,588	25.32	–3.41
Rhinoceros	Kyle Storey	237	0.52	–
Total valid votes		45,767	99.83	
Total rejected ballots		76	0.17	+0.04
Turnout		45,843	71.50	–2.69
Eligible voters		64,118		
New Democratic gain from Progressive Conservative		Swing		+7.49
Source: Elections Canada

=== 1979 ===
1979 Canadian federal election
Party	Candidate	Votes	%	±%
Progressive Conservative	Donald Niel Cameron	19,369	43.74	–
Liberal	Leonard Marchand	12,720	28.72	–
New Democratic	Ron H. Anderson	12,193	27.53	–
Total valid votes		44,282	99.87	
Total rejected ballots		56	0.13	–
Turnout		44,338	74.19	–
Eligible voters		59,762		
Progressive Conservative notional hold		Swing		–
This riding was created from parts of Fraser Valley East, Kamloops—Cariboo and Okanagan—Kootenay, which elected two Progressive Conservatives and one Liberal (Kamloops—Cariboo). Liberal Leonard Marchand was the incumbent from Kamloops—Cariboo.
Source: Elections Canada

== See also ==
- List of Canadian electoral districts
- Historical federal electoral districts of Canada
