= Rafe Mair =

Canadian politician and radio personality (1931-2017)

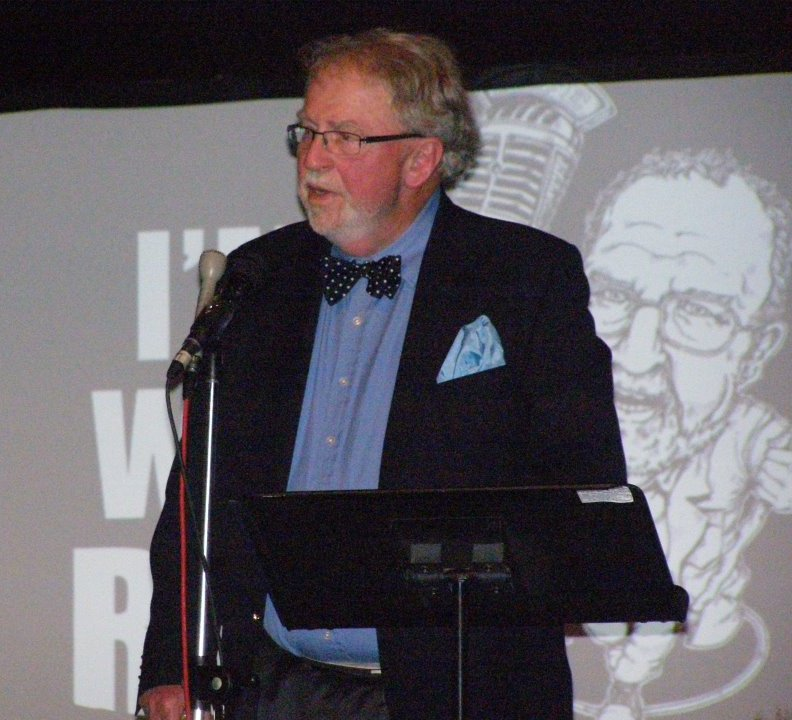
- Mair in 2011

Member of the British Columbia Legislative Assembly for Kamloops
- In office 11 December 1975 – 1 February 1981
- Preceded by: Gerald Hamilton Anderson
- Succeeded by: Claude Richmond

Minister of Health of British Columbia
- In office 24 November 1979 – 6 January 1981
- Premier: Bill Bennett
- Preceded by: Bob McClelland
- Succeeded by: Jim Nielsen

Minister of Environment of British Columbia
- In office 5 December 1978 – 24 November 1979
- Premier: Bill Bennett
- Preceded by: Jim Nielsen
- Succeeded by: Stephen Rogers

Minister of Consumer and Corporate Affairs of British Columbia Minister of Consumer Services (1975-1976)
- In office 22 December 1975 – 5 December 1978
- Premier: Bill Bennett
- Preceded by: Phyllis Florence Young
- Succeeded by: Jim Nielsen

Personal details
- Born: Kenneth Rafe Mair; 31 December 1931 Vancouver, British Columbia, Canada
- Died: 9 October 2017 (aged 85) Vancouver, British Columbia, Canada
- Party: Social Credit
- Spouse(s): Evelyn MacInnes (divorced) Patti Ballard (divorced) Wendy Conway (m. 1994)
- Education: University of British Columbia
- Occupation: Lawyer, pundit, radio personality, politician

Kenneth Rafe Mair (31 December 1931 – 9 October 2017) was a Canadian lawyer, political commentator, radio personality and politician in British Columbia. He represented the riding of Kamloops in the British Columbia Legislative Assembly from 1975 to 1981 as part of the Social Credit Party (Socred) caucus, and served as cabinet minister under Premier Bill Bennett. He left politics to embark on a career in media, raising controversy for his views on both the Meech Lake and Charlottetown constitutional accords. He served as the plaintiff of the historic Supreme Court of Canada decision Rafe Mair v. Kari Simpson.

== Early life ==
Mair was born in Vancouver as the elder of two sons to mother Frances Tyne (née Leigh), known as Frankie, and father Kenneth Frederick Robert Mair, a salesman born in Auckland, New Zealand; they had married in Vancouver 16 months earlier. He grew up in the neighbourhood of Kerrisdale; his father purchased a Japanese-owned paper box factory when Japanese Canadians were interned during World War II, generating sufficient income to allow Rafe to attend the private St. George's School. He subsequently returned to the public school system and graduated from Prince of Wales Secondary School in 1949 before entering the University of British Columbia (UBC). He went on to attend the UBC Faculty of Law, graduating in 1956.

He worked in the lumber, oil and insurance industries, then started articling in 1960 with Vancouver lawyer Tom Griffiths. Called to the bar in 1961, he practiced in Vancouver and handled numerous personal injury cases. He then moved to Kamloops in 1968 to join the practice of his law school classmate Jarl Whist, a Liberal who had run twice unsuccessfully against Progressive Conservative MP E. Davie Fulton, before starting his own firm.

Mair became an avid fisherman and developed an interest in public affairs from his mother's work at The Province newspaper.

== Political career ==
His electoral career began with his election to Kamloops city council in 1973. Previously involved with the Liberal Party, he was an opponent of the British Columbia New Democratic Party (BC NDP) government of Premier Dave Barrett. He won the Social Credit nomination for Kamloops in May 1975, and went on to defeat NDP incumbent Gerry Anderson in the December election by 14,639 votes to 10,975; he won re-election in 1979 by 3,309 votes.

He was named to Premier Bill Bennett's cabinet in December 1975 as Minister of Consumer Services; the post was modified to Minister of Consumer and Corporate Affairs in October 1976. He subsequently swapped portfolios with Jim Nielsen in December 1978 to become Minister of Environment, before being re-assigned as Minister of Health in November 1979. During the negotiations to patriate the Constitution of Canada, he was BC's chief delegate on constitutional matters from 1977 to 1980.

He held the Kamloops seat until leaving politics in 1981; the seat was taken over by fellow Socred Claude Richmond.

== Media personality ==
In 1981, Mair left government and joined Vancouver radio station CJOR 600AM as morning talk show host. He left the station in 1984 over a proposed salary cut, and was replaced by former premier Dave Barrett. He switched to rival CKNW, initially hosting the late night slot, then moved to the prime morning slot by 1988. In the early 1990s, he gained national notoriety and support alike for his role as an outspoken opponent of the Meech Lake and Charlottetown constitutional accords. His show was cancelled by CKNW in 2003 despite high ratings; he subsequently returned to 600AM, now an oldies station broadcasting under the callsign CKBD, to serve as morning show host until 2005.

In the fall of 2005, he became a regular commentary guest on Omni Television's prime time current affairs program, The Standard (seen in Vancouver on CHNU-TV). Mair contributed three commentaries a week until January 2006 when the Commentary segment of the program was axed. However, he continued his relationship with The Standard, guest-hosting the program from time to time. In 2009 he began hosting a program called The Search with Rafe Mair, seen locally on Joytv and nationally on VisionTV. Until his death, he was a regular columnist for a chain of community newspapers as well as for the online magazine The Tyee, and often appeared nationally as a political commentator for several outlets including CBC Radio One.

In 2008, the Supreme Court of Canada unanimously ruled in Mair's favour in Rafe Mair v. Kari Simpson, his appeal against a provincial court decision that he had defamed social activist Kari Simpson in his editorial in 1999.

== Views ==
Although he was traditionally considered a political conservative, Mair's views were moderate on certain issues; notably the environment and social welfare. Disillusioned with the three mainstream federal parties, he became a significant supporter of the Green Party urging people to vote for them in recent federal and provincial elections. Though he shied away from endorsing entire parties, he supported individual candidates, such as New Democrat candidate Svend Robinson in Vancouver Centre.

In 2009, Mair publicly stated that he voted NDP in that year's provincial election. He had written why he thought that Premier Gordon Campbell failed British Columbians; among the reasons he cited were that the BC Liberals were destroying the publicly owned utility, BC Hydro, and were giving away British Columbia's water rights to international corporate interests.

Mair was the spokesperson for Save Our Rivers, a group organized to fight private run-of-the-river hydroelectric developments.

== Personal life ==
Mair was a Type II diabetic and publicly announced his experiences with depression in 1995 while working as a broadcaster.

Mair authored several books on Canadian politics, including his memoirs, and was a regular columnist at the online newsmagazine The Tyee. He was a principal contributor until his death to The Common Sense Canadian, a news and opinion site with a British Columbia focus.

While attending law school, he married his first wife Evelyn MacInnes, with whom he had one son and three daughters; their marriage ended after their daughter Shawn died in a car accident. His second marriage was to his longtime producer Patti Ballard, and he married his third wife Wendy Conway in 1994.

Mair died on 9 October 2017 in Vancouver at the age of 85.

== Selected works ==
- Canada, is anyone listening? (1998) ISBN 1-55263-000-5
- Rants, raves and recollections (2000) ISBN 1-55285-145-1
- Still Ranting: More Rants, Raves, and Recollections (2002) ISBN 0-8020-7458-8
- Rafe : a memoir (2004) ISBN 1-55017-319-7
- Hard talk (2005) ISBN 1-55017-374-X
- Over the Mountains: More Thoughts on Things that Matter (2006) ISBN 1-55017-371-5
- I Remember Horsebuns (2015) ISBN 978-1-987857-25-2
- Politically Incorrect: How Canada Lost its Way and the Simple Path Home (2017) ISBN 978-0-9953286-2-4

== Awards ==
- 1977 – Queen Elizabeth II Coronation Anniversary Medal
- 1993 – B.C. Association of Broadcasters "Broadcast Performer of the Year"
- 1995 – Haig-Brown Award for Conservation work
- 1995 – Michener Award from the Governor-General of Canada for courageous journalism, the first radio broadcaster to do so (nominated on two other occasions)
- 1997 – BC Branch of the Canadian Mental Health Association "Media Person Of the Year"
- 1997 – National Canadian Mental Health Association Media Person of The Year (shared with Pamela Wallin)
- 1998 – BC Branch of the Canadian Mental Health Association "Media person of The Year"
- 2003 – Bruce Hutchison Award for Lifetime Achievement from the Jack Webster Foundation
- 2005 – Inducted into the Canadian Association of Broadcasters' Hall of Fame
- 2005 – Named by readers poll of Georgia Straight (78,000 responses) as best talk show host in Vancouver
