= James Reginald Colley =

Canadian politician (1880–1968)

MLA for Kamloops
- In office 1924–1928
- Preceded by: Frederick William Anderson
- Succeeded by: John Ralph Michell

Personal details
- Born: March 26, 1880 Yorkshire, England
- Died: November 8, 1968 (aged 88) Victoria, British Columbia, Canada
- Party: Liberal

James Reginald Colley (May 24, 1880 – November 8, 1968) was a Canadian politician. He served in the Legislative Assembly of British Columbia from 1924 to 1928 from the electoral district of Kamloops, as a Liberal. In 1928, he was defeated in his bid for reelection in the electoral district of Kamloops. He was also defeated in the 1933 general election when he ran for the Liberal Party in the electoral district of Salmon Arm.

He was the mayor of Kamloops from 1923 to 1924
