= Kamloops (provincial electoral district) =

Defunct provincial electoral district in British Columbia, Canada

Kamloops was a provincial electoral district for the Legislative Assembly of British Columbia, Canada, from 1903 to 2009.

Kamloops voted for the winning party in every election it was contested, from the riding's creation in 1903 up until its final election in 2005.

== Demographics ==
Population, 2001	48,959
Population Change, 1996–2001	1.3%
Area (km^{2})	2,695.61
Pop. Density (people per km^{2})	18

== Electoral history ==
10th British Columbia election, 1903
Party	Candidate	Votes	%	±	Expenditures
Conservative	Frederick John Fulton	517	51.14%		unknown
Liberal	John Francis Deane	494	48.86%		unknown
Total valid votes		1,011	100.00%		
Total rejected ballots					
Turnout		%			

11th British Columbia election, 1907
Party	Candidate	Votes	%	±	Expenditures
Conservative	Frederick John Fulton	534	54.88%		unknown
Liberal	John Donald Swanson	439	45.12%		unknown
Total valid votes		973	100.00%		
Total rejected ballots					
Turnout		%			

12th British Columbia election, 1909
Party	Candidate	Votes	%	±	Expenditures
Conservative	James Pearson Shaw	872	64.40%		unknown
Liberal	Henry Maxwell Vasey	482	35.60%		unknown
Total valid votes		1,354	100.00%		
Total rejected ballots					
Turnout		%			

13th British Columbia election, 1912
Party	Candidate	Votes	%	±	Expenditures
Conservative	James Pearson Shaw	931	70.11%		unknown
Liberal	Raymond Findlay Leighton	397	29.89%		unknown
Total valid votes		1,328	100.00%		
Total rejected ballots					
Turnout		%			

14th British Columbia election, 1916
Party	Candidate	Votes	%	±	Expenditures
Liberal	Frederick William Anderson	1,519	61.27%		unknown
Socialist	James Pearson Shaw	960	38.73%	–	unknown
Total valid votes		2,479	100.00%		
Total rejected ballots					
Turnout		%			

1920 British Columbia general election
Party	Candidate	Votes	%
Liberal	Frederick Wilhelm Anderson	1,617	37.43
Conservative	Matthew Fulton Crawford	1,295	29.98
United Farmers	John Owen Stevens	1,408	32.59
Total valid votes		4,320	100.00

16th British Columbia election, 1924
Party	Candidate	Votes	%	±	Expenditures
Liberal	James Reginald Colley	1,212	41.38%		unknown
Conservative	Edwin Arthur Meighen	997	34.04%		unknown
Provincial	William Frederick Palmer	720	24.58%	–	unknown
Total valid votes		2,929	100.00%		
Total rejected ballots					
Turnout		%			

17th British Columbia election, 1928
Party	Candidate	Votes	%	±	Expenditures
Conservative	John Ralph Michell	1,531	50.25%		unknown
Liberal	James Reginald Colley	1,516	49.75%		unknown
Total valid votes		3,047	100.00%		
Total rejected ballots		66			
Turnout		%			

18th British Columbia election, 1933
Party	Candidate	Votes	%	±	Expenditures
Liberal	Robert Henry Carson ^{1}	1,836	44.76%		unknown
Co-operative Commonwealth Fed.	George Richmond Williams	1,360	33.15%		unknown
Non-Partisan Independent Group	David Brown Johnstone	906	22.09%	–	unknown
Total valid votes		4,102	100.00%		
Total rejected ballots		85			
Turnout		%			
^{1} Brother of Ernest Crawford Carson, Conservative MLA for Lillooet. Both became cabinet ministers in their respective governments. Their father, Virginian Robert Carson, came west via the Sierra Nevada passes to California and, coming north for the Fraser Canyon Gold Rush, homesteaded on Pavilion Mountain on one of BC's earliest ranches.

19th British Columbia election, 1937
Party	Candidate	Votes	%	±	Expenditures
Liberal	Robert Henry Carson	1,786	38.89%		unknown
Conservative	Alfred Hugh Bayne	1,461	31.82%		unknown
Co-operative Commonwealth Fed.	George Faulds Stirling	1,345	29.29%		unknown
Total valid votes		4,592	100.00%		
Total rejected ballots		47			
Turnout		%			

1941 British Columbia general election
Party	Candidate	Votes	%
Liberal	Robert Henry Carson	1,933	40.14
Co-operative Commonwealth	Charles Edward Scanlan	1,712	35.55
Conservative	Nathaniel Nye	1,138	23.63
Socialist Labour	John Marshall	19	0.39
Independent	Walter Unnett Homfray	14	0.29
Total valid votes		4,816	100.00
Total rejected ballots		100	

21st British Columbia election, 1945
Party	Candidate	Votes	%	±	Expenditures
Coalition	Robert Henry Carson	2,804	57.78%	–	unknown
Co-operative Commonwealth Fed.	George Richmond Williams	1,893	39.01%		unknown
Labor-Progressive	Charles Herbert Cook	156	3.21%		unknown
Total valid votes		4,853	100.00%		
Total rejected ballots		54			
Turnout		%			

22nd British Columbia election, 1949
Party	Candidate	Votes	%	±	Expenditures
Coalition	Sydney John Smith	4,992	64.47%	–	unknown
Co-operative Commonwealth Fed.	Charles Archibald Smith	2,751	35.53%		unknown
Total valid votes		7,743	100.00%		
Total rejected ballots		105			
Turnout		%			

1952 British Columbia general election
Party	Candidate	Votes 1st count	%	Votes final count	%
Social Credit League	Philip Arthur Gaglardi	3,108	38.44	4,002	54.32
Liberal	Sydney John Smith	2,708	33.49	3,366	45.68
Co-operative Commonwealth	Ralph Wilbur Emery	1,311	16.21		
Progressive Conservative	George Henry Greer	959	11.86		
Total valid votes		8,086	100.00	7,368	100.00
Total rejected ballots		231			
Note: Preferential ballot. First and final of three counts only shown.

1953 British Columbia general election
Party	Candidate	Votes 1st count	%	Votes final count	%
Social Credit	Philip Arthur Gaglardi	4,037	49.33	4,171	51.44
Liberal	Robert Gordon Carson^{5}	2,272	27.75	2,503	30.87
Co-operative Commonwealth	Pete Wright	1,368	16.72	1,434	17.69
Progressive Conservative	Gilbert Smith	427	5.22		
Labor–Progressive	Robert Gordon Carson^{5}	80	0.98		
Total valid votes		8,184	100.00	8,108	100.00
Total rejected ballots		356			
Note: Preferential ballot. First and second of two counts only shown.
^{5} Son of Robert Henry Carson, previous Liberal MLA for this riding.

25th British Columbia election, 1956
Party	Candidate	Votes	%	±	Expenditures
Social Credit	Philip Arthur Gaglardi	4,948	61.02%	–	unknown
Liberal	Thomas Palmer Wilson	2,017	24.87%		unknown
Co-operative Commonwealth Fed.	Victor Mauro	1,144	14.11%		unknown
Total valid votes		8,109	100.00%		
Total rejected ballots		53			
Turnout		%			

26th British Columbia election, 1960
Party	Candidate	Votes	%	±	Expenditures
Social Credit	Philip Arthur Gaglardi	4,777	45.86%	–	unknown
CCF	Ronald Edmund Green	2,828	27.15%		unknown
Liberal	Thomas Palmer Wilson	1,437	13.80%		unknown
Progressive Conservative	Peter John Millward	1,374	13.19%		unknown
Total valid votes		10,416	100.00%		
Total rejected ballots		531			
Turnout		%			

1963 British Columbia general election
Party	Candidate	Votes	%
Social Credit	Philip Arthur Gaglardi	5,669	47.17%
Progressive Conservative	Edmund Davie Fulton	4,473	37.22%
New Democratic	Lance Randle	1,297	10.79%
Liberal	Henry Maxwell Smith	580	4.83%
Total valid votes		12,019	100.00%
Total rejected ballots		71	

28th British Columbia election, 1966
Party	Candidate	Votes	%	±	Expenditures
Social Credit	Philip Arthur Gaglardi	5,753	52.35%	–	unknown
New Democratic	Lance Randle	3,237	29.45%		unknown
Liberal	Nicholas Harvey Kalyk	2,000	18.20%		unknown
Total valid votes		10,990	100.00%		
Total rejected ballots		63			
Turnout		%			

29th British Columbia election, 1969
Party	Candidate	Votes	%	±	Expenditures
Social Credit	Philip Arthur Gaglardi	7,572	45.12%	–	
Liberal	Malcolm Bates (Mack) Bryson	4,860	28.96%		unknown
New Democratic	James Andrew Jacobs	4,351	25.93		unknown
Total valid votes		16,783	100.00%		
Total rejected ballots		120			
Turnout		%			

30th British Columbia election, 1972
Party	Candidate	Votes	%	±	Expenditures
New Democratic	Gerald Hamilton Anderson	7,497	32.19%		unknown
Social Credit	Philip Arthur Gaglardi	6,812	29.25%	–	unknown
Liberal	George William Mercer	5,691	24.43%		unknown
Progressive Conservative	John Archibald Willoughby	3,243	13.92%		unknown
Independent	Terrence Andrew Shaw	48	0.21%		unknown
Total valid votes		23,291	100.00%		
Total rejected ballots		154			
Turnout		%			

31st British Columbia election, 1975
Party	Candidate	Votes	%	±	Expenditures
Social Credit	Rafe Mair	14,639	48.67%	–	unknown
New Democratic	Gerald Hamilton Anderson	10,975	36.49%		unknown
Liberal	Donald Norman Carter	4,464	14.84%		unknown
Total valid votes		30,078	100.00%		
Total rejected ballots		236			
Turnout		%			

32nd British Columbia election, 1979
Party	Candidate	Votes	%	±	Expenditures
Social Credit	Rafe Mair	15,430	51.74%	–	unknown
New Democratic	Andrew Lapa	12,121	40.64%		unknown
Progressive Conservative	Murray Regis Pratt	2,273	7.62%		unknown
Total valid votes		29,824	100.00%		
Total rejected ballots		545			
Turnout		%			

British Columbia provincial by-election, May 14, 1981: Kamloops
Party	Candidate	Votes	%	±%
Social Credit	Claude Richmond	10,833	45.13%	–
New Democratic	Howard Donald Dack	10,058	41.91	–
Progressive Conservative	James Thomas Walsh	2,298	9.57	–
Liberal	David Brian Kendall	704	2.93	–
Independent	John Ernest Currie	145	1.87	–
Total valid votes		24,002	100.00	
Total rejected ballots		179		
Turnout				
Eligible voters				
Social Credit hold		Swing		Social Credit

33rd British Columbia election, 1983
Party	Candidate	Votes	%	±	Expenditures
Social Credit	Claude Richmond	21,114	57.11%	–	unknown
New Democratic	David Phillip Reiter	14,627	39.56%		unknown
Independent	Andrew Lapa	972	2.63%		unknown
Independent	Christopher Keith Sumner	259	0.70%		unknown
Total valid votes		36,972	100.00%		
Total rejected ballots		356			
Turnout		%			

34th British Columbia election, 1986 ^{6}
Party	Candidate	Votes	%	±	Expenditures
Social Credit	Claude Richmond	17,478	25.64%	–	unknown
Social Credit	Bud Smith	16,869	24.74%	–	unknown
New Democratic	David Phillip Reiter	16,442	24.12%		unknown
New Democratic	Peter Rolston ^{7}	15,131	22.20%		unknown
Liberal	Norman A. Morrison	1,277	1.87%		unknown
Green	Trudy M. Frisk	695	1.02%	–	unknown
Independent	Leon Mikulin	282	0.41%		unknown
Total valid votes		68,174	100.00%		
Total rejected ballots		1,148			
Turnout		%			
^{6} Seat increased to two members from one..
^{7} Previously elected in the riding of Dewdney and grandson of Social Credit figure Tilly Rolston..

B.C. General Election 1991: Kamloops
Party	Candidate	Votes	%	±	Expenditures
NDP	Arthur Charbonneau	8,926	43.67%		$26,908
Liberal	Kimball B. Kastelen	6,033	29.52%	–	$12,595
Social Credit	Patricia A. Wallace	5,481	26.81%	–	$72,408
Total Valid Votes		20,440	100.00%		
Total Rejected Ballots		247	1.19%		
Turnout		20,687	71.65%		

B.C. General Election 1996: Kamloops
Party	Candidate	Votes	%	±	Expenditures
New Democratic	Cathy McGregor	10,135	44.30	+0.63	$29,790
Liberal	Gur Singh	9,273	40.53	+11.01	$45,486
Reform	Joe Leong	1,721	7.52	–	$7,280
Progressive Democrat	Deborah J. Fisher	1,241	5.42	–	$4,471
Social Credit	Ken Endean	508	2.22	-24.59	$6,538
Total Valid Votes		22,878	100.00%		
Total Rejected Ballots		172	0.75%		
Turnout		23,050	69.56%		

2001 British Columbia general election
Party	Candidate	Votes	%	±%	Expenditures
Liberal	Claude Richmond	12,258	60.21	19.68	$43,147
New Democratic	Cathy McGregor	4,592	22.55	-21.75	$26,572
Green	Joe Teichman	2,180	10.71	–	
Marijuana	Julian Gushulak	707	3.47	–	$410
Unity	Ruth Watson	430	2.11	–	$1,224
Independent	Ernie Schmidt	193	0.95	–	$491
Total Valid Votes		20,360	100.00		
Total Rejected Ballots		174	0.85		
Turnout		20,534	72.46		

2005 British Columbia general election
Party	Candidate	Votes	%	±%	Expenditures
Liberal	Claude Richmond	11,261	47.58	-12.63	
New Democratic	Doug Brown	9,886	41.77	+19.22	
Green	Frank Stewart	1,723	7.28	–	
Conservative	Terry Frank Bojarski	797	3.37	–	
Total		23,667	100.00		

== See also ==
- List of British Columbia provincial electoral districts
- Canadian provincial electoral districts
