= Sydney John Smith =

Canadian politician (1892–1976)

The Honourable Sydney John Smith PC
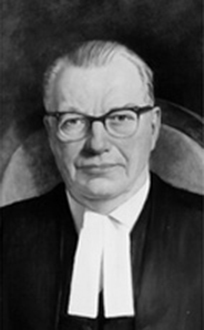

Member of the Legislative Assembly of British Columbia for Kamloops
- In office June 15, 1949 – June 11, 1952
- Preceded by: Robert Henry Carson
- Succeeded by: Philip Arthur Gaglardi

Canadian Senator from British Columbia
- In office January 3, 1957 – December 31, 1968
- Appointed by: Louis St. Laurent

Personal details
- Born: September 23, 1892 Ottawa, Ontario, Canada
- Died: July 15, 1976 (aged 83) Victoria, British Columbia, Canada
- Education: New York University
- Occupation: Businessman; politician

Sydney John Smith, PC (September 23, 1892 - July 15, 1976), was a Canadian politician, farmer, rancher and businessman who served as Speaker of the Senate of Canada from 1966 to 1968.

== Background ==
Born in Ottawa, Ontario, Smith was educated at Lisgar Collegiate Institute before moving to Saskatchewan with his family. He studied at New York University through correspondence courses and played football with the Regina Roughriders as well as working as an automobile salesman.

He eventually settled in Gull Lake, Saskatchewan where he became an alderman and then mayor from 1921 to 1925.

Smith attempted to win a seat in the Saskatchewan legislature as a Liberal in 1934 but was defeated.

He then moved to Kamloops, British Columbia where he raised cattle and grew hops as well as involving himself in selling automobile sales and heavy equipment. He organized several businesses, Sydney Smith Ltd., Sydney Smith U Drive Ltd., Sydmar Estates Ltd., and the Highway Equipment Co. Ltd., among others, and held a number of directorships in other firms.

In 1951 and 1952 he was chairman of the British Columbia Hospital Insurance Inquiry Board.

Smith entered British Columbia politics in the 1949 provincial election and was elected as MLA for the Kamloops riding for the British Columbia Liberal Party (then in a coalition with the Conservative Party) but was defeated after one term with much of the rest of the Coalition caucus (his successor in the Kamloops seat was Phil Gaglardi, who would become a member of the new Social Credit cabinet). He served as president of the British Columbia Liberal Association from 1953 to 1959 and was summoned to the Senate on January 3, 1957, on the advice of Prime Minister Louis St. Laurent.

He was appointed Speaker of the upper house in early 1966 on the advice of Lester Pearson and served for two years. He stepped down as Speaker in September 1968 and then resigned from the Senate on December 31 due to ill health.

He died in Victoria, British Columbia in 1976.
