= Charles Willoughby (politician) =

Canadian politician

Charles James McNeil Willoughby

Member of Parliament for Kamloops
- In office 8 April 1963 – 7 November 1965
- Preceded by: Davie Fulton
- Succeeded by: Davie Fulton

Personal details
- Born: 30 March 1894 Cookstown, Ontario, Canada
- Died: 5 September 1995 (aged 101) Kamloops, British Columbia, Canada
- Party: Progressive Conservative
- Profession: Physician; Surgeon

Charles James McNeil Willoughby (30 March 1894 – 5 September 1995) was a Progressive Conservative party member of the House of Commons of Canada. He was born in Cookstown, Ontario, and became a physician and surgeon by career.

He was first elected at the Kamloops riding in the 1963 general election and served one term, the 26th Canadian Parliament. Willoughby did not seek re-election after this.
