= Nelson Riis =

Canadian politician

Nelson Andrew Riis
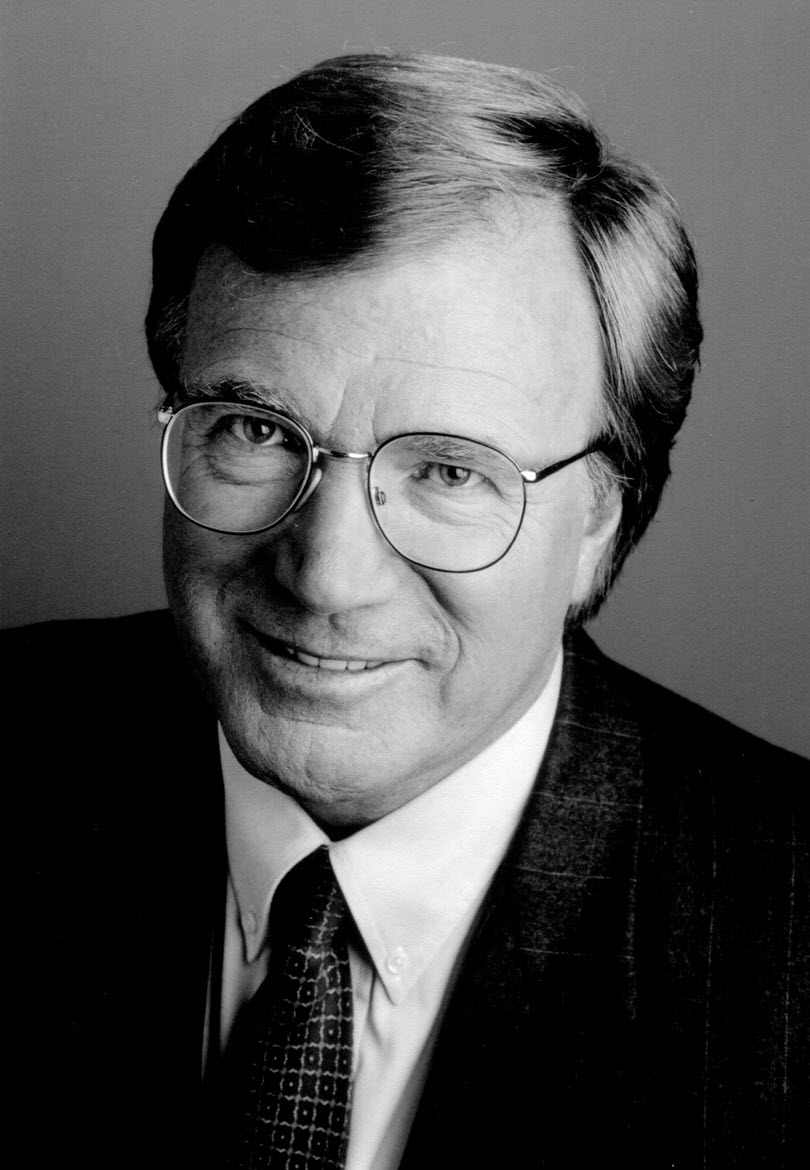

Member of the Canadian Parliament for Kamloops—Shuswap
- In office 1980–1988
- Preceded by: Donald Niel Cameron
- Succeeded by: District was abolished in 1987

Member of the Canadian Parliament for Kamloops
- In office 1988–2000
- Preceded by: District was created in 1987
- Succeeded by: Betty Hinton (district changed name in 1998)

Personal details
- Born: 10 January 1942 (age 84) High River, Alberta, Canada
- Party: New Democratic Party

Nelson Andrew Riis (born 10 January 1942) is a Canadian businessman and former Member of Parliament (MP).

== Early life ==
Nelson Riis was born in High River, Alberta, on 10 January 1942 to Hans and Signe Riis. He attended school in Longview, Alberta, and Port Moody, BC. Early occupations included clerk, waiter, fisherman, surveyor, truck driver, timber cruiser, farm labourer, deckhand, and refinery worker.

Nelson graduated from the University of British Columbia (UBC) with a Bachelor of Education (BEd) in 1967 and Master of Arts (MA) (Geography) in 1970. In the late 1960s, he taught in both elementary and secondary schools. In the 1970s, he taught in the newly created Geography Department of Cariboo College (now known as Thompson Rivers University) in Kamloops, and held the position of chair of the Social Sciences Department 1970–1973 and 1978–1980.

== Political career ==
In Kamloops, he served as an alderman 1973–1978 and as a school trustee 1978–1980.

As a New Democratic Party (NDP) member, he was elected to the House of Commons of Canada in 1980, and re-elected in 1984, 1988, 1993, and 1997, before defeat in 2000. He was party finance critic 1981–1986 and critic for other commerce-related portfolios during this period. He served as NDP caucus chair 1984–1986 and 1996–2000, and house leader 1986–1996.

While an MP, he wrote a weekly newspaper column and hosted a weekly half-hour TV show. Of the 43 NDP MPs, he was one of the eight who survived the 1993 federal election.

Riis was rumoured at various times in the 1980s to have been offered cabinet positions in the Brian Mulroney government if he were willing to cross the floor and join the Progressive Conservative Party. During his parliamentary career, he introduced legislation which made ice hockey Canada's official winter sport, and unsuccessfully demanded that the government block Wayne Gretzky's trade from the Edmonton Oilers to the Los Angeles Kings.

== Later life ==
During the early 2000s as an officer and director, Riis made overly optimistic and misleading claims and unreasonable financial projections with respect to Canadian Rockport Homes International, a start-up company established to manufacture and sell modular housing. In response, the BC Securities Commission fined him $40,000 and banned him for two years from acting as a director, or officer of any issuer, or engaging in investor relations. Consequently, the executive officers incorporated the company in the US and continued operations.

Following his 2000–2010 association with Rockport, he became a consultant on long term care planning. He serves as a volunteer director and founding member of Canadian Eyesight Global.

To present the various challenges confronting modern society, he used the fictional form in his 2023 novel Foothills Justice. That year, he urged Prime Minister Justin Trudeau to follow through on his promise to ban the export of horses for slaughter, liking the practice to "cruel and unusual punishment" and "torture."

== Marriage and children ==
In 1966, he married Irene (Penny) Patricia Hill. Their two children are Nils Petter and Jonathon James.
