= Patriation =

Political process leading to full Canadian sovereignty

Patriation is the political process that led to full Canadian sovereignty, culminating with the Constitution Act, 1982. The process was necessary because, at the time, under the Statute of Westminster, 1931, and with Canada's agreement, the British Parliament retained the power to amend Canada's British North America Acts and to enact, more generally, for Canada at the request and with the consent of the Dominion. That authority was removed from the UK by the enactment of the Canada Act, 1982, on March 29, 1982, by the Parliament of the United Kingdom, as requested by the Parliament of Canada.

A proclamation bringing the Constitution Act, 1982, into effect was signed by Elizabeth II, as Queen of Canada, Prime Minister Pierre Trudeau, and Minister of Justice Jean Chrétien on April 17, 1982, on Parliament Hill in Ottawa. The patriation process saw the provinces granted influence in constitutional matters and resulted in the constitution being amendable by Canada only and according to its amending formula, with no role for the United Kingdom.

The monarch's constitutional powers over Canada were not affected by the act. Canada has complete sovereignty as an independent country; the role of the monarch of Canada is distinct from that of the monarch of the UK or any other Commonwealth realm.

The Constitution Act, 1982 formed the template for the removal of the British Parliament's powers over other similar Commonwealth realms. In 1986, the Australia Act 1986 and the Constitution Act 1986 (New Zealand) also confirmed the total independence of the two countries' political processes from the United Kingdom.

== Etymology ==
The word patriation was coined in Canada as a back-formation from repatriation (returning to one's country). Prior to 1982, power to amend the Canadian constitution was held by the Parliament of the United Kingdom (subject in some respects to request and consent from Canada); hence some have felt that the term patriation was more suitable than the term repatriation (returning something). The term was first used in 1966 by Prime Minister Lester B. Pearson in response to a question in Parliament: "We intend to do everything we can to have the constitution of Canada repatriated, or patriated."

== Early attempts ==
From 1867, the constitution of Canada was primarily contained in the British North America Act, 1867 and other British North America Acts, which were passed by the Parliament of the United Kingdom. Several Canadian prime ministers, starting with William Lyon Mackenzie King in 1927, had made attempts to domesticize the amending formula, but could not obtain agreement with the provincial governments as to how such a formula would work. Thus, even after the Statute of Westminster granted Canada and other Commonwealth nations full legislative independence in 1931, Canada requested that the British North America Act, 1867, be excluded from the laws that were now within Canada's complete control to amend; until 1949, the constitution could only be changed by a further act at Westminster. The British North America (No. 2) Act, 1949, granted the Parliament of Canada limited power to amend the constitution in many areas of its own jurisdiction, without involvement of the United Kingdom. The constitution was amended in this manner five times: in 1952, 1965, 1974, and twice in 1975.

Negotiations continued sporadically between federal and provincial governments on the development of a new amending formula in which the United Kingdom would have no part. In the 1960s, efforts by the governments of prime ministers John Diefenbaker and Lester Pearson, including the Confederation of Tomorrow conference in Canada's centennial year, (Note: The conference was held between November 27 and 30, 1967, on the 54th floor of the newly finished Toronto-Dominion Bank Tower. The summit was convened by Ontario Premier John Robarts and attended by all the other provincial premiers except W.A.C. Bennett.) culminated in the Fulton–Favreau formula, but without Quebec's endorsement, the patriation attempt failed.

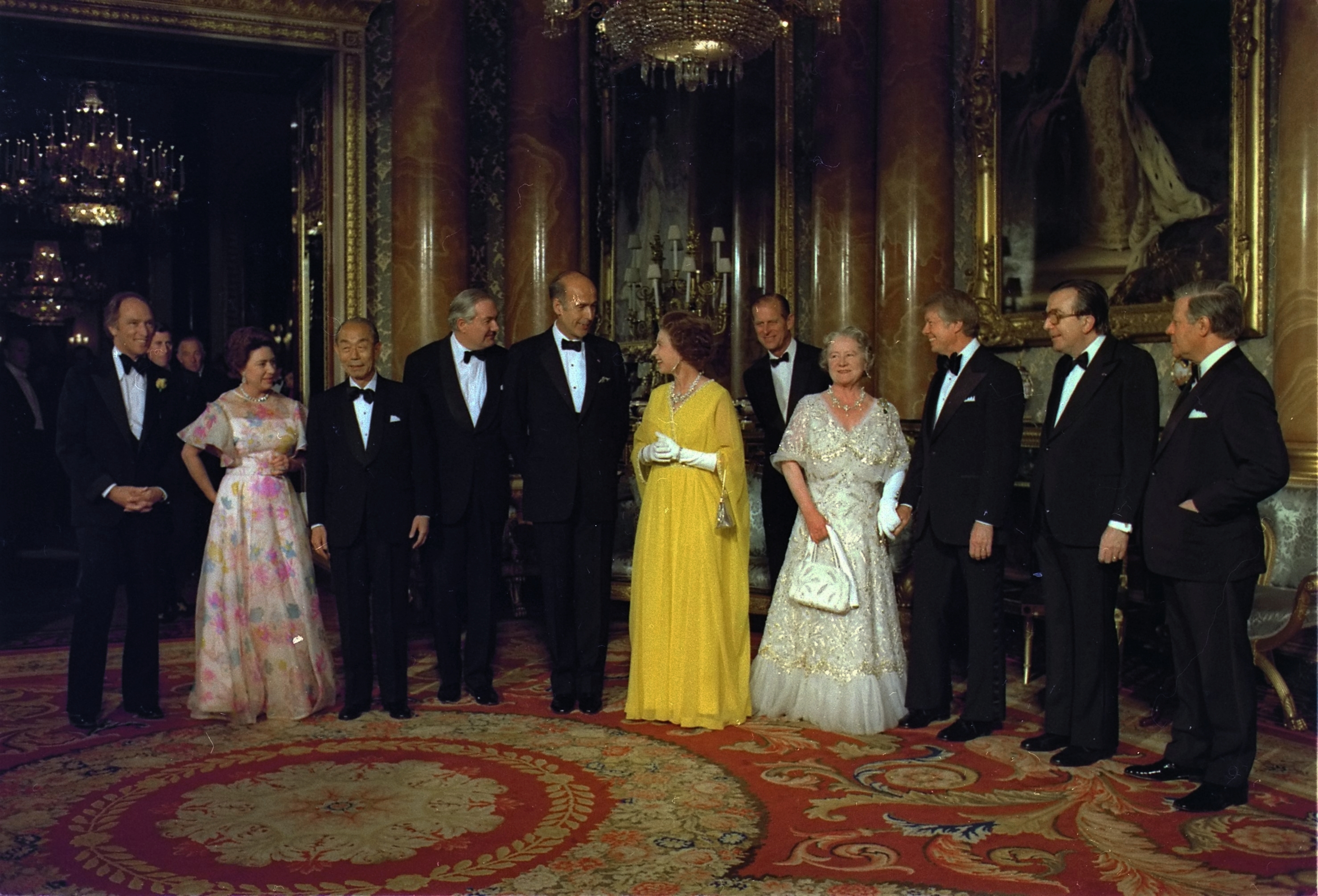
Pierre Trudeau (far left) with Elizabeth II (centre) at Buckingham Palace, 1977

In 1968, Pearson was succeeded by Pierre Trudeau, who also advocated patriation. He made several attempts, including the Victoria Charter in 1971 and more proposed amendments in 1978. At the 1978–1979 conference, Trudeau prepared for the first time to provide some federal concessions with regard to the division of powers, including family law, fisheries, and resources. However, the other premiers balked, which led to speculation they were waiting to see if the more province-friendly Progressive Conservatives would win the coming federal election. In that campaign, the Liberals ran on constitutional change, including a speech at Maple Leaf Gardens in which Trudeau promised unilateral action if the premiers did not agree to patriation.

== Patriation achieved ==
Patriation was given a new impetus after the 1980 referendum on Quebec independence, before which Trudeau promised a new constitutional agreement if the majority of Quebecers voted "No". As the referendum did result in a majority rejecting separation, Trudeau approached his British counterpart, Margaret Thatcher, to inform her the Canadian government wanted to patriate the constitution. Thatcher's reply was that the British Parliament would allow this, with provincial approval or not.

After a number of days of negotiation between Trudeau and the premiers and the leak of the Kirby Memo by an "internal federal source", which antagonized Quebec, the premiers consulted at the Chateau Laurier and drafted a list of 10 powers to be devolved to the provinces in exchange for consent to patriation. Trudeau, when presented with the document, refused to accept it and reiterated his threat that he would seek the House of Commons' approval to proceed with a unilateral amendment. Faced with Premier of Manitoba Sterling Lyon's charge that it would "tear the country apart", Trudeau responded that, if Canada could not have control of its own constitution and a charter when most provinces had their own, the country would deserve to be torn apart. This led Thatcher to take a less certain view of how things might proceed through the British legislature, sensing the provincial opposition would make the legislation controversial in Parliament.

=== Canada Bill and provincial opposition ===
Trudeau announced his belief that the premiers were dealing in bad faith and met with his caucus to propose a new course. After offering a wide range of options and proposing full reform, a Quebec MP shouted "Allons-y en Cadillac!" (translated by Trudeau to mean "let's go first class ... be liberal to the end ... not to temper our convictions with political expediency"). Taking the proposal to Cabinet, some ministers suggested using the manoeuvre to increase federal power over the economy, but Trudeau demurred, replying "we shouldn't upset the balance". On October 2, 1980, he announced on national television his intention to proceed with unilateral patriation in what he termed the "people's package". The proposal would request patriation from the UK Parliament, as well as the entrenchment of a charter of rights, and would call for a referendum to be held within two years on the amending formula for the new constitution, which would be a choice between the Victoria Charter veto formula and any joint proposal by the provinces that could be approved by provinces totalling 80% of the population. (Note: The Victoria Charter formula was chosen due to it being unanimously accepted at that conference in 1972, which eventually failed on other grounds; An amendment would require the approval of Ontario, Quebec, two Western provinces, two Atlantic Provinces, and the Federal government. The second proposal requiring provinces consisting of 80% of the population would, by necessity, require Ontario's and Quebec's approval.) In the same month, the attorneys general of six provinces launched suits in three provincial courts, seeking clarity on whether or not the federal Cabinet could request the British Parliament pass legislation that would alter the balance of power between the provincial and federal crowns without the support of provincial governments. The British government became adverse to introducing any bill that might be found to be unconstitutional.

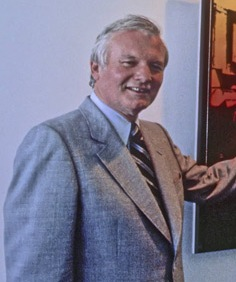
Premier of Ontario Bill Davis

Trudeau found new allies in Premiers Bill Davis (Ontario) and Richard Hatfield (New Brunswick) and the federal New Democratic Party, under Ed Broadbent, announced its support after persuading Trudeau to devolve some resource powers to the provinces. The prime minister's proposal in the House of Commons, which would be tabled as the Canada Bill, invited Aboriginal, feminist, and other groups to Ottawa for their input on the charter of rights in legislative committees. However, there was disagreement over the charter, which the premiers of six provinces (Lyon, René Lévesque of Quebec, Bill Bennett of British Columbia, Angus MacLean of Prince Edward Island, Peter Lougheed of Alberta, and Brian Peckford of Newfoundland) opposed as encroachments on their power; the press dubbed them the Gang of Six. Manitoba, Newfoundland, and Quebec launched references to their respective Courts of Appeal asking if the Canada Bill was constitutional. Nova Scotia and Saskatchewan remained neutral.

At the insistence of British Columbia, the premiers who opposed unilateral patriation drafted an alternative proposal to showcase the disagreement between the sides and to counter the federal government's charges of obstructionism if the document were to proceed to Westminster. The idea was for patriation to take place with no charter of rights and the amending formula would permit amendment with the approval of seven provinces consisting of 50% of the population, referred to as the Vancouver Formula. The premiers' innovation was a clause allowing for dissenting provinces to "opt out" of new amendments that superseded provincial jurisdiction and receive equivalent funding to run a substitute programme if two-thirds of the members of the provincial legislature acquiesced. Nova Scotia and Saskatchewan approved of this, prompting the press to now call the opposition premiers the Gang of Eight.

Trudeau rejected the proposed document out of hand and again threatened to take the case for patriation straight to the British Parliament "[without] bothering to ask one premier". The federal Cabinet and Crown counsel took the position that if the British Crown—in Council, in Parliament, and on the bench—was to exercise its residual sovereignty over Canada, it did so at the request of the federal ministers of the Crown only. Further, officials in the United Kingdom indicated that the British Parliament was under no obligation to fulfill any request for legal changes made by Trudeau, particularly if Canadian convention was not being followed. The British Commons Foreign Affairs Committee drafted a report in January 1981 stating it would be wrong for the Parliament of the United Kingdom to enact the proposals regardless of the provincial opposition.

=== Patriation Reference ===
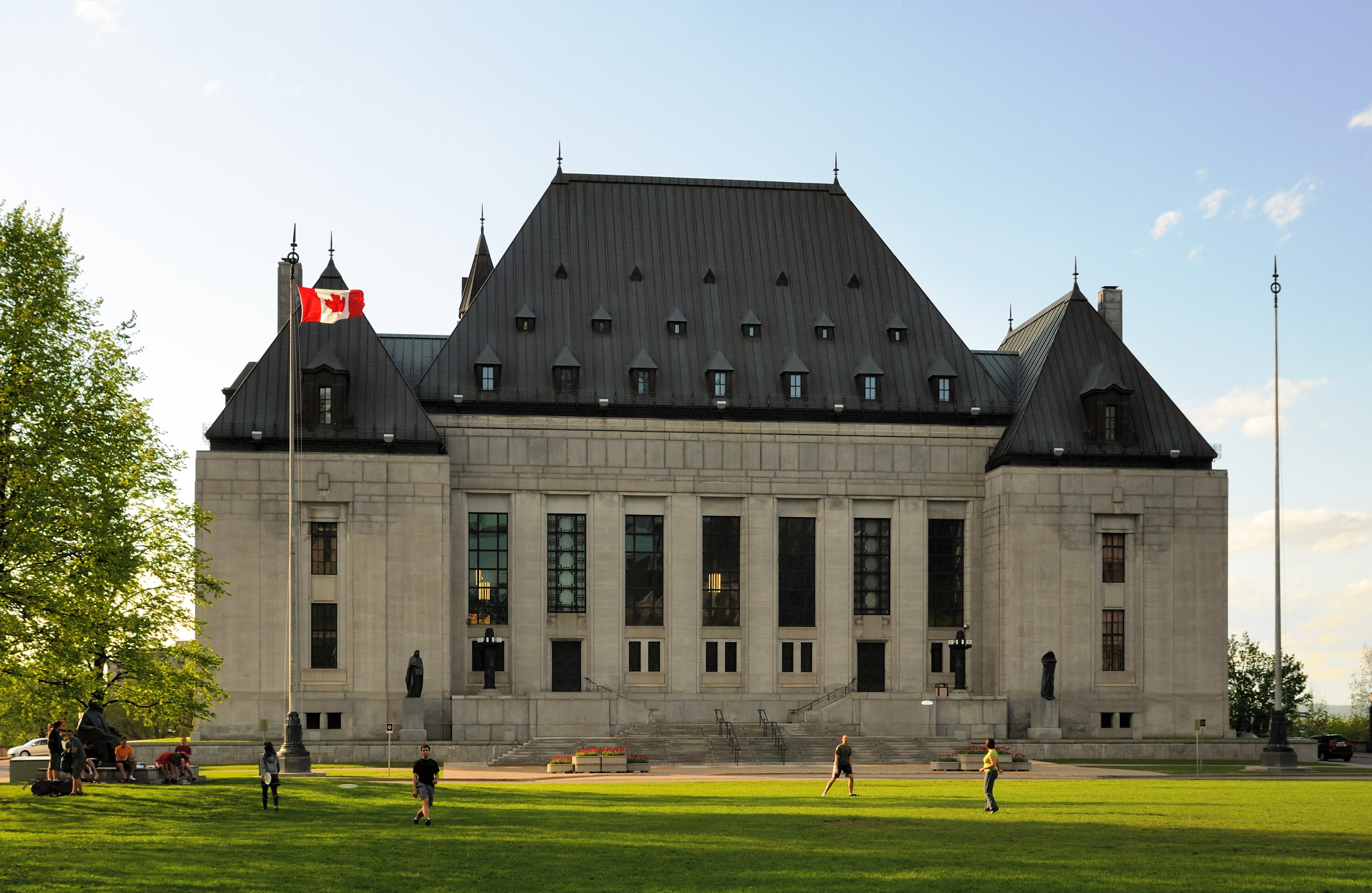
The Supreme Court of Canada

The Courts of Appeal in Newfoundland, Quebec, and Manitoba delivered their opinions on the reference questions in the second quarter of 1981. The Manitoba and Quebec Courts of Appeal answered the questions posed by their provincial governments in favour of the federal government, ruling that there was no constitutional objection to the federal government proceeding unilaterally. The Court of Appeal of Newfoundland, however, ruled in favour of the provincial government. It held that both as a matter of constitutional law and constitutional convention, the federal government could not request the proposed amendments from the British Parliament without the consent of the provinces. The case was then appealed to the Supreme Court of Canada. The governments of Manitoba and Quebec appealed from the decisions of the Courts of Appeal in those provinces and the federal government appealed from the decision of the Newfoundland Court of Appeal.

On September 28, 1981, the court ruled in a 7–2 decision on live television that the federal government had the right, by letter of the law, to proceed with the unilateral patriation of the constitution. However, by a different 6–3 majority, the court said that the constitution was made up as much of convention as written law and ruled that a unilateral patriation was not in accordance with constitutional convention. Although the courts enforce laws, not constitutional conventions, the court's decision stated that agreement by a "substantial" number of premiers would be required to abide by the convention. This number was not defined and commentators later criticized the court's failure to rule that the approval of all provinces was required. The decision was controversial and a loss for the premiers. Lévesque would later remark, "in other words, Trudeau's goals might be unconstitutional, illegitimate, and even 'go against the principles of federalism', but they were legal!" Trudeau, in his memoirs, paraphrased the court as saying "that patriation was legal, but not nice".

Both the United Kingdom and Canada undertook contingency preparations: Margaret Thatcher's British cabinet explored simply unilaterally patriating the constitution to Canada with an amending formula requiring unanimous approval of the provinces. Trudeau began to plan for a referendum proposing a unilateral declaration of independence in the event of a United Kingdom refusal.

=== Constitutional Conference, November 1981 ===
The decision set the stage for a meeting amongst all premiers and Trudeau in Ottawa, on November 2, 1981. The conference opened with Trudeau announcing an openness to a new amending formula, Davis postulating that his cabinet could accept an agreement without an Ontario veto, and Hatfield proposing deferral of some elements of a charter. This was seen as a general opening toward the provincial proposal, though Trudeau declared the charter was non-negotiable.

Pierre Trudeau (left) and Jean Chrétien (right) at a session of the 1981 constitutional talks

On November 3, a compromise put to Trudeau involving amending the Group of Eight's proposal with a limited charter was met with a blunt refusal, with federal officials declining a "gutted charter", while Lévesque and Trudeau argued on the language provisions of the charter. On November 4, the premiers' breakfast meeting saw two new proposals floated: The Premier of Saskatchewan, Allan Blakeney, would accept a charter without language rights and constitutional amendment by any seven provinces, regardless of population and the removal of financial compensation, while Bennett would allow Trudeau his language rights provisions in exchange for other considerations. Lyon and Lévesque were angered and refused to go along, with Lougheed successfully suggesting the ideas be proposed to test Trudeau's negotiating position. In return, Trudeau launched a new federal initiative to the premiers: patriate the constitution as it was, but continue debates for two years and, if deadlock resulted, hold a national referendum on the amending formula and charter. Lévesque, fearing the alliance was crumbling and facing mocking remarks by Trudeau that as a "great democrat" (especially after the recent referendum he initiated on Quebec's independence), but confident he could ensure any referendum on a charter would fail, agreed in principle. Trudeau promptly announced a "Canada–Quebec alliance" on the issue to the press, stating "the cat is among the pigeons".

The other seven opposition premiers were startled: campaigning against the protection of rights was generally seen as political suicide and a national referendum could be seen as "conventionalizing" the charter without the need for provincial approval. Further, Canadians nationwide were mostly in agreement with Trudeau on the issue and were tired of the constant constitutional talks; the draft text of the federal proposal was later revealed to involve the approval of Trudeau's reforms, with referendums being only if provinces representing 80% of the population demanded them within the two years. This prompted Lévesque to back away from the referendum proposal, saying it looked as though it was "written in Chinese". The conference descended again into acrimony, with Trudeau and Lévesque angrily clashing over language rights. Trudeau announced that he would attend one final meeting at 9 am the following day and head to Westminster if agreement was not reached. Peckford announced that Newfoundland would forward a proposal the next day. Lévesque and the Quebec delegation went to sleep in Hull, Quebec, for the night.

=== Kitchen Accord ===
That afternoon—November 4, 1981—the Minister of Justice, Jean Chrétien, met with Attorney General of Saskatchewan Roy Romanow and Attorney General of Ontario Roy McMurtry in the kitchen of Ottawa's Government Conference Centre. The attorneys general discussed a scenario in which the provinces would agree to the charter and disallowing opting out with compensation, while Chrétien agreed to the Vancouver amending formula and reluctantly offered to include the notwithstanding clause in the constitution. Chrétien, who had been deeply involved in supporting the "no" side of the Quebec referendum and abhorred the possibility of another one, recommended the compromise to Trudeau, but the prime minister felt, given the previous chaos, it would still be impossible to obtain the agreement of his provincial counterparts and demurred. In the evening, Davis, however, agreed in principle to the compromise and told Trudeau that he should do so as well, informing him he would not be on his side if he proceeded unilaterally at that point. Trudeau, who knew that his position in London was growing tenuous, even with the support he had, accepted. Thus, working with the draft proposal created by the Newfoundland delegation, the six groups worked through the night to prepare the compromise proposal. This period would be called the Kitchen Accord; the men at the table that night became known as the Kitchen Cabinet. In exchange for agreeing to the inclusion of the notwithstanding clause, Trudeau declined to remove the federal powers of disallowance and reservation from the draft Constitution.

At the end of this period of negotiations, René Lévesque left to sleep at Hull, a city on the other side of the Ottawa river, before leaving he asked the other premiers (who were all lodged in Ottawa) to call him if anything happened. Lévesque and his people, all in Quebec, remained ignorant of the agreement until Lévesque walked into the premiers' breakfast and was told the agreement had been reached. Lévesque refused to give his support to the deal and left the meeting; the government of Quebec subsequently announced on November 25, 1981, that it would veto the decision. However, both the Quebec Court of Appeal and the Supreme Court, which issued its ruling on the matter on December 6, 1982, stated that Quebec had never held such veto powers.

The events were divisive. Quebec nationalists saw the deal as the English-speaking premiers betraying Quebec, which prompted use of the term Nuit des longs couteaux, or "Night of the Long Knives". (Note: Trudeau, in his essay on the Quebec referendum, regarding the curious and distasteful use of this description, remarked: "The 'Night' in question is of course that of the so-called 'Long Knives', a label shamelessly borrowed from Nazi history by separatists suffering from acute paranoia.") In English Canada, Lévesque was seen as having tried to do the same to the English-speaking premiers by accepting the referendum. Among those was Brian Mulroney, who said that by "accepting Mr. Trudeau's referendum idea, Mr. Lévesque himself abandoned, without notice, his colleagues of the common front." Chrétien's role in the negotiations made him reviled among sovereigntists. Until the Quebec Liberals came to power in 1985, every law passed in Quebec used the notwithstanding clause.

Further, Peckford rebuked in an article in The Globe and Mail claims the events that night resembled anything akin to the Kitchen Accord or Night of the Long Knives. According to Peckford, four premiers—from Newfoundland, Saskatchewan, Prince Edward Island, and Nova Scotia—and senior representatives from Alberta and British Columbia, worked from a proposal brought to the meeting by the Newfoundland delegation. Efforts were made to reach the other provinces, including Quebec, but to no avail. Peckford further asserted that Chrétien was not contacted and he had no knowledge of the "so-called kitchen meetings". The proposal agreed upon that night was essentially the same as the Newfoundland delegation's, except for minor alterations to wording and the addition of a new section, and the final draft was to go to all the provinces for approval the following morning.

Peckford's assertions have, in turn, been challenged by Howard Leeson, who was then the Saskatchewan Deputy Minister for Intergovernmental Affairs and present during all of the negotiations that night. He claimed that, while the officials did work from Newfoundland's draft, it was only because it was largely similar to the Kitchen Accord, which had already been developed and agreed to by the governments of Ontario and Saskatchewan and was known to the federal government. Further, Peckford played only a minor role that evening, entering later, with the majority of the negotiating being done by Blakeney and Davis. Leeson concluded that Davis and Lougheed were the most important players in securing an agreement. In his opinion, the presence in the National Archives of Canada of the Kitchen Accord leaves no doubt about its existence and it was one of several crucial linkages in the patriation negotiations.

=== Legal closure ===
With the agreement of the majority of provincial governments, the federal government moved to implement the patriation package. Joint resolutions of the Canadian House of Commons and the Senate requested that the Queen cause to be introduced in the British Parliament the necessary legislation to patriate the constitution. The resolution contained the text of what was to become the Canada Act, 1982, which included the Constitution Act, 1982. Though certain British parliamentarians continued to oppose the bill based on concerns about the rights of Canada's Indigenous peoples, the Parliament at Westminster passed the Canada Act, 1982, and Queen Elizabeth II, as Queen of the United Kingdom, granted royal assent on March 29, 1982, 115 years to the day when Queen Victoria gave assent to the British North America Act, 1867. The Constitution Act, 1982, included an amending formula involving only the federal House of Commons and Senate and provincial legislative assemblies. Section 2 of the Canada Act states that no subsequent UK law "shall extend to Canada as part of its law", while item 17 of its schedule also amends the Statute of Westminster by removing the "request and consent" provision. Elizabeth II then, as Queen of Canada, proclaimed the patriated constitution in Ottawa on April 17, 1982. (Note: On the royal proclamation parchment were spaces for the signatures of the Queen, Trudeau, and the Registrar General of Canada; at the signing ceremony, however, Trudeau offered Chrétien an opportunity to also place his name on the document. The pen's nib had, by that point, been broken, leading Chrétien to utter under his breath "merde!" (French for "shit"), which the Queen overheard and laughed at. The broken pen caused a smudge at the end of Chrétien's signature. The desk upon which the proclamation was signed (known as the Constitution Table) resides in the office of the Speaker of the Senate of Canada.)

Today I have proclaimed this new constitution [...] There could be no better moment for me, as Queen of Canada, to declare again my unbounded confidence in the future of this wonderful country.

— Elizabeth II, Queen of Canada, Ottawa, Ontario, April 17, 1982

Canada had established the final step in complete sovereignty as an independent country, with the Queen's role as monarch of Canada separate from her role as the British monarch or the monarch of any of the other Commonwealth realms.

Paul Martin Sr, who was in 1981 sent, along with John Roberts and Mark MacGuigan, to the UK to discuss the patriation project, noted that, during that time, the Queen had taken a great interest in the constitutional debate and the three found the monarch "better informed on both the substance and politics of Canada's constitutional case than any of the British politicians or bureaucrats." Trudeau commented in his memoirs: "I always said it was thanks to three women that we were eventually able to reform our Constitution[, including] The Queen, who was favourable ... I was always impressed not only by the grace she displayed in public at all times, but by the wisdom she showed in private conversation."

Being aware that this was the first time in Canadian history that a major constitutional change had been made without the Quebec government's agreement and Quebec's exclusion from the patriation agreement had caused a rift, the Queen privately conveyed to journalists her regret that the province was not part of the settlement. (Note: The Queen later publicly expressed on October 22 and 23, 1987, her personal support for the Meech Lake Accord, which attempted to bring Quebec governmental backing to the patriated constitution by introducing further amendments, and she received criticism from opponents of the accord, which failed to attract the unanimous support from all federal and provincial legislators required for it to pass.) Quebec sovereigntists have, since 1982, demanded that the Queen or another member of the Canadian Royal Family apologize for the enactment of the Constitution Act, 1982, calling the event a part of a "cultural genocide of francophones in North America over the last 400 years". In 2002, Premier of Quebec Bernard Landry directed the executive council and lieutenant governor not to recognise Elizabeth's golden jubilee in protest of the Queen having signed the Constitution Act, 1982.

== Legal questions ==
As constitutional scholar Robin White has noted, some might think that, since the Canada Act, 1982, is British as well as Canadian law, the United Kingdom could theoretically repeal it and declare its laws to be binding in Canada. Peter Hogg, however, disputes this view, noting that since Canada is now sovereign, the Supreme Court of Canada would find a British law which purported to be binding in Canada just as invalid in Canada "as a law enacted for Canada by Portugal." Paul Romney argued in 1999 that, regardless of what the British authorities did, the constitutional principle of responsible government in Canada denied them the right to ever again legislate for Canada; he stated: "[T]he constitutional convention known as responsible government entailed legal as well as political sovereignty. Responsible government meant that the Queen of Canada could constitutionally act for Canada only on the advice of her Canadian ministers. If the British Parliament were to legislate for Canada, except at the request of the competent Canadian authorities, and the Queen assented to that legislation on the advice of her British ministers, Canadian courts would refuse to enforce that legislation."
