= John Ralph Michell =

Member of the Legislative Assembly of British Columbia
- In office 1928–1933
- Preceded by: James Reginald Colley
- Succeeded by: Robert Henry Carson
- Constituency: Kamloops

Personal details
- Born: August 12, 1861 Swansea, Wales
- Died: October 4, 1947 (aged 86) Kamloops, British Columbia
- Party: British Columbia Conservative Party
- Spouse(s): Martha Armstrong; Emma McKenzie
- Occupation: rancher, businessman

John Ralph Michell (August 12, 1861 – October 4, 1947) was a Canadian politician. He served in the Legislative Assembly of British Columbia from 1928 until his retirement at the 1933 provincial election, from the electoral district of Kamloops, a member of the Conservative party. He also served as the mayor of Kamloops from 1903 to 1904.
