= WIC Radio Ltd v Simpson =

Supreme Court of Canada decision

- Supreme Court of Canada

Hearing: June 27, 2007 Judgment: December 4, 2008
- Full case name: WIC Radio Ltd and Rafe Mair, Appellants v Kari Simpson, Respondent, with Canadian Civil Liberties Association, British Columbia, Civil Liberties Association and Canadian Newspaper Association, Ad IDEM/Canadian Media Lawyers Association, British Columbia Association of Broadcasters, RTNDA Canada/Association of Electronic Journalists, Canadian Publishers' Council, Magazines Canada, Canadian Association of Journalists and Canadian Journalists for Free Expression (Collectively "Media Coalition"), Interveners
- Ruling: Appeal succeeded

Court membership
- Chief Justice: Beverley McLachlin; Puisne Justices: Michel Bastarache, Ian Binnie, Louis LeBel, Marie Deschamps, Morris Fish, Rosalie Abella, Louise Charron, Marshall Rothstein

Reasons given
- Unanimous reasons by: Binnie, William Ian Corneil

WIC Radio Ltd v Simpson (2008) is a case on appeal from the Court of Appeal for British Columbia to the Supreme Court of Canada on defamation.

After CKNW radio talk show host Rafe Mair broadcast an editorial that compared activist Kari Simpson to Adolf Hitler, the Ku Klux Klan, and former Alabama governor George Wallace, among others, Simpson sued Mair and his employer, WIC Radio Ltd., for defamation.

A 2006 B.C. Court of Appeal decision written by then-justice Mary Southin, concluded that Mair defamed Simpson and could not rely on the defence of fair comment. In 2008, the Supreme Court of Canada ruled that Mair had, in fact, defamed Simpson. However, the Supreme Court used this case to redefine defamation in Canada. Because the old legal test no longer applied, the Supreme Court found for the appellants Mair and WIC Radio Ltd.

The Supreme Court decision was regarded as likely to encourage public commentators to be more brave in criticizing public figures.
