= Phil Gaglardi =

Canadian politician

The Reverend Phil Gaglardi

Mayor of Kamloops
- In office December 1988 – December 1990
- Preceded by: John Dormer
- Succeeded by: Kenna Cartwright

Member of the British Columbia Legislative Assembly for Kamloops
- In office June 12, 1952 – August 30, 1972
- Preceded by: Sydney John Smith
- Succeeded by: Gerald Hamilton Anderson

Personal details
- Born: Philip Arthur Gaglardi; January 13, 1913 Mission, British Columbia
- Died: September 23, 1995 (aged 82) Vancouver, British Columbia
- Party: British Columbia Social Credit Party
- Spouse: Jennie Sandin (m. 1938)
- Children: Bob Gaglardi; Bill Gaglardi
- Relatives: Tom Gaglardi (grandson)
- Occupation: minister, politician

Philip Arthur "Flying Phil" Gaglardi (January 13, 1913 – September 23, 1995), was a Canadian politician and Pentecostal minister who served in the cabinet of British Columbia Premier W. A. C. Bennett from 1952 to 1972. A member of the Social Credit Party, he served as Minister of Highways from 1952 to 1968, overseeing a major expansion of British Columbia's highway network and transportation infrastructure. He later served as Mayor of Kamloops from 1988 to 1990.

== Early life and career ==
Gaglardi was born in British Columbia to Italian immigrant parents and was raised on a homestead near Mission. He was not given a middle name at birth; however, as a young man, he liked the initials "P.A. Gaglardi" and legally added "Arthur" to his name. In 1938 he married Jennie Sandin, a Pentecostal minister who had encouraged him to enter the ministry. He attended Northwest Bible Institute and was ordained as a Pentecostal minister. In 1944 he moved to Kamloops, where the couple took charge of Calvary Temple (now St. Andrew's).

Gaglardi began the radio program Chapel in the Sky and his wife began the Aunt Jennie broadcast. He continued his weekly 15-minute broadcasts throughout his political career.

The Gaglardis had two sons: Bob Gaglardi, founder of Northland Properties, a hospitality and entertainment company whose holdings include hotels, restaurants, and the NHL's Dallas Stars; and Bill Gaglardi, a Calgary businessman.

== Political career ==
Gaglardi was first elected to the legislature in 1952 as the member for Kamloops, with the Social Credit Party. The party had enough seats to form a minority government, but had no leader. Gaglardi ran for the post, but lost in a vote of caucus members. It was reported that Gaglardi lost to W.A.C. Bennett by ten votes to nine, but according to Bennett's biographer, Bennett received ten of the 19 votes and Gaglardi only one. He served in the Cabinet for the full duration of Bennett's premiership.

=== Minister of Highways ===
Gaglardi was appointed Minister of Public Works in Bennett's first cabinet, on August 1, 1952. At the same time Bennett created a new Department of Highways and appointed Gaglardi its first Minister. Gaglardi's ministry was marked by the rapid expansion of the province's paved road system and the completion of most of the major road bridges in British Columbia. Bennett described the building program as "the greatest highway building program per capita in the entire Western world."

Strikes at CP and Black Ball ferries in 1958 cut off transportation to Vancouver Island, and after discussions with company management and unions initially proved unsuccessful, Premier Bennett announced his government would provide its own ferry service. Known for "cutting through bureaucracy and getting things done", Gaglardi was handed responsibility for ship design and construction, and for determining the terminal locations. In less than two years, BC Ferries began sailing between Tsawwassen (near Vancouver) and Swartz Bay (near Victoria, on Vancouver Island). The government ferry service expanded rapidly, and Gaglardi said he "built the whole system around my own impatience."

Gaglardi convinced a reluctant Premier Bennett to buy the government a Learjet. Bennett had been traveling in a newly inaugurated government-owned ferry to Prince Rupert. To demonstrate that the ferry was too slow for government business, Gaglardi engaged a pilot friend to fly him to Prince Rupert in a Learjet, and got there before Bennett did. Gaglardi waited on the dock to greet the Premier with a purchase contract for the plane. The plane was quickly purchased.

Gaglardi earned the nickname "Flying Phil" from getting speeding tickets when driving in large-engined cars around the province, checking on the progress of road construction, or in his own words "testing the curves." When pulled over, he would show his pilot's license and say, "I wasn't driving too fast, I was flying too low."

In the 1963 election Davie Fulton, who had retired from federal politics to lead the BC Progressive Conservative Party, ran against Gaglardi in his riding of Kamloops. Gaglardi defeated Fulton by several thousand votes, and Fulton soon returned to federal politics.

In 1968 Gaglardi came under fire in the legislature over recurring allegations of preferred highway access to property owned by his sons, use of departmental facilities to provide sign material and construction to benefit their properties, and departmental work performed on his private property. He announced his resignation in March 1968 after revelations of flying his daughter-in-law and grandson on the government jet. Bennett let it be known that Gaglardi had been fired, which was not the case. He continued in Cabinet as minister without portfolio.

=== Minister of Social Welfare/Minister of Rehabilitation and Social Improvement ===
In 1969 Gaglardi was appointed to the social welfare portfolio, which he renamed the Department of Rehabilitation and Social Improvement. He spoke publicly about "deadbeats", vowed to become "the roughest, toughest, most effective welfare minister the world has ever known", and created an agency to assist the indigent in getting jobs.

During the 1972 election, he predicted that Bennett would resign soon after winning the election, accused the premier of being "an old man who doesn't understand what is happening with the young people of this province", described the cabinet as "filled with square pegs in round holes", and stated, "I'm the only real choice for the job." Gaglardi was defeated in Kamloops and the Socreds lost to the New Democratic Party.

=== Mayor of Kamloops ===
Gaglardi served as mayor of Kamloops from 1988 to 1990. He led a fledgling municipal political party called Team Action whose candidates won a majority of the city council.

== After politics ==
After leaving politics he involved himself in the running of his son's Sandman Inns. In 1978, he seriously considered running for the leadership of the Social Credit Party of Canada but later withdrew.

Gaglardi Way, a major thoroughfare in Burnaby connecting the Trans-Canada Highway to Simon Fraser University, is named for him.

A statue of Gaglardi was erected in Kamloops. It stands at five feet, four inches.

== Quotes ==
- "Air pollution is the smell of money"
- "If I'm lying, it's only because I'm telling the truth"
- As a minister both of a church and of the crown, he noted that he saw his duty to keep the highways "in such shape that motorists will avoid the language which would deny them access to the highway to heaven"
- Speaking of unions, in 1959 in the Legislature: "We don't need any Hoffas or gangsterism in this province".
- "They talk of Roman roads in Europe but they don't compare to Gaglardi roads in British Columbia."

== Cabinet Positions ==
British Columbia provincial government of William Andrew Cecil Bennett
Cabinet posts (4)
| Predecessor | Office | Successor |
|---|---|---|
| Daniel Campbell | Minister of Rehabilitation and Social Improvement; October 27, 1969–September 15, 1972 | Norman Levi |
| Established | Minister without Portfolio; March 21, 1968–October 27, 1969 | Abolished |
| Ministry Established | Minister of Highways; March 15, 1955–March 21, 1968 | W.A.C. Bennett |
| Edward Tourtellotte Kenney | Minister of Public Works; August 1, 1952–March 15, 1955 | William Chant |

== Sources ==
- Mitchell, David J., WAC and The Rise of British Columbia, Vancouver/Toronto, 1983. ISBN 0-88894-395-4
- Rothenburger, Mel, Friend o' Mine, Orca Books, 1999. ISBN 0-88983-011-8
