= Fulton–Favreau formula =

Proposed Canadian constitutional amendment formula

The Fulton–Favreau formula was a proposed formula of amendment of the Constitution of Canada developed by federal justice minister E. Davie Fulton and Quebec Liberal Guy Favreau in the 1960s. The Fulton–Favreau formula would have achieved the patriation of the Constitution.

== Amending formula ==
Under the formula, all provinces would have to approve amendments that would be relevant to provincial jurisdiction including the use of the French and English languages, but only the relevant provinces would be needed to approve amendments concerned with a particular region of Canada. Two-thirds of the provinces representing half of the population, as well as the federal Parliament, would be needed for amendments regarding education.

== Debate ==
During the negotiations, a number of controversies arose over the Fulton–Favreau accord, including that the unanimity constituted a "strait jacket" that would make the Constitution too difficult to amend. The premier of Saskatchewan also argued that the debates over Canadian federalism, particularly the increasing decentralization being pushed for by regional leaders such as Quebec Premier Jean Lesage, threatened to render the federal government powerless, to the "point of no return", at which point Canada would no longer be a viable entity. In turn, Lesage argued he was merely pushing for Quebec and French Canada to fully develop their rightful roles within Canada.

New Democratic Party leader Tommy Douglas also expressed concern that, while the patriation of the Constitution would be beneficial, the new Constitution would "entrench" property and civil rights. This would make the jurisdictional issue amendable only by unanimity, which would potentially threaten growth of labour legislation, medicare and other social services.

== Legacy ==
Though the formula officially died in 1965 when Quebec Premier Lesage withdrew his support, a modified version of this formula was finally adopted in 1982, with the enactment of the Constitution Act, 1982 and the patriation of the Canadian Constitution.
