= Leonard Marchand =

Canadian politician (1933–2016)

The Honourable Leonard Marchand PC CM OBC

Minister of the Environment
- In office April 2, 1979 – June 3, 1979
- Prime Minister: Pierre Trudeau
- Preceded by: Roméo LeBlanc
- Succeeded by: John Allen Fraser

Canadian Senator from British Columbia
- In office June 29, 1984 – March 1, 1998
- Appointed by: Pierre Trudeau

Member of Parliament for Kamloops–Cariboo
- In office June 25, 1968 – May 21, 1979
- Preceded by: Riding created
- Succeeded by: Riding dissolved

Personal details
- Born: Leonard Stephen Marchand; November 16, 1933 Vernon, British Columbia, Canada
- Died: June 3, 2016 (aged 82) Kamloops, British Columbia, Canada
- Party: Liberal
- Spouse: Donna Parr (m. 1960)
- Children: 2
- Education: University of British Columbia (BS); University of Idaho (MS)
- Profession: Agricultural scientist

Leonard Stephen "Len" Marchand PC CM OBC (November 16, 1933 – June 3, 2016) was a Canadian politician. He was the first person of First Nations status to serve in the federal cabinet, after being the first Status Indian elected and serving as a Member of Parliament. He served as Parliamentary Secretary, Minister of State, Minister of the Environment and Senator.

== Early life ==
Marchand was born in Vernon, British Columbia on November 16, 1933. A member of the Okanagan Indian Band, he attended school at the Okanagan Indian Day School, the Kamloops Indian Residential School and Vernon high school. He went on to graduate from the University of British Columbia in 1959 with a Bachelor of Science degree in agriculture. In 1964 Marchand later completed a master's degree in range management from the University of Idaho. After pursuing a career as an agronomist, he left the field in the mid-1960s to work with the North American Indian Brotherhood. His work in native affairs took him to Ottawa to lobby on Aboriginal issues. He was hired as a special assistant to two successive Cabinet ministers.

== Political career ==
Marchand entered politics and was elected to the House of Commons in the 1968 election as a Liberal Party candidate for the British Columbia riding of Kamloops-Cariboo. He defeated high-profile Progressive Conservative candidate E. Davie Fulton. He was the first Status Indian to be elected as an MP.

He became parliamentary secretary to Jean Chrétien, who was the Minister of Indian Affairs and Northern Development, helping persuade Prime Minister Pierre Trudeau to begin land settlement negotiations between the federal government and the First Nations.

In 1976, Marchand was appointed to the Cabinet as Minister of State for small business. He was the first Status Indian to be appointed to a cabinet position. In 1977, he was promoted to Minister of the Environment, and held the post until his and the government's defeat in the 1979 election.

Marchand returned to British Columbia where he became administrator for the Nicola Valley Indian Administration. In 1984, he was appointed to the Senate, the second First Nations Canadian to be appointed (the first was officially James Gladstone, but in reality was Guy Williams). Marchand persuaded the Upper House to establish the Senate Committee on Aboriginal Peoples, on which he served as chairman.

Marchand retired from the Senate in 1998 at the age of 64, eleven years ahead of the mandatory retirement age, in order to spend more time in British Columbia. He died on June 3, 2016.

Member of Parliament Robert Falcon Ouellette gave a tribute to Len Marchand in the House of Commons on June 9, 2016.

== Family ==
Marchand is the father of Leonard Marchand Jr., the Chief Justice of British Columbia and Chief Justice of the Court of Appeal of Yukon, and Lori Marchand, the Managing Director of Indigenous Theatre at the National Arts Centre.

== Legacy and honours ==
- In 1999, he was made a Member of the Order of Canada.
- In 2000, Caitlin Press published his autobiography, Breaking Trail.
- In 2014, Marchand received the Order of British Columbia.

Ribbon	Description	Notes
	Order of Canada (CM)	Member; 1999
	Order of British Columbia (OBC)	Member; 2014
	Queen Elizabeth II Silver Jubilee Medal	1977; Canadian Version of this Medal
	125th Anniversary of the Confederation of Canada Medal	1992
	Queen Elizabeth II Golden Jubilee Medal	2002; Canadian Version of this Medal
	Queen Elizabeth II Diamond Jubilee Medal	2012; Canadian version of this Medal

- Marchand was sworn in as a Member of the Queen's Privy Council for Canada on September 15, 1976, giving him the accordant style "The Honourable" and the post-nominal letters "PC" for life.
- In 1999, Marchand was given the honorary degree of Doctor of Laws from Thompson Rivers University.

== Electoral record ==
1968 Canadian federal election: Kamloops—Cariboo
Party	Candidate	Votes	%	±%
Liberal	Leonard Marchand	13,000	40.48	–
Progressive Conservative	Edmund Davie Fulton	9,704	30.22	–
New Democratic	Vernor Wilfred Jones	7,566	23.56	–
Social Credit	Peter Robert Gook	1,842	5.74	–
Total valid votes		32,112	99.41	
Total rejected ballots		191	0.59	
Turnout		32,303	77.12	
Eligible voters		41,888		
Liberal notional gain		Swing		–
This riding was created from Cariboo and Kamloops, which elected a Social Credit and a Progressive Conservative, respectively, in the last election. Davie Fulton was the incumbent from Kamloops.
Source: Library of Parliament

1972 Canadian federal election: Kamloops—Cariboo
Party	Candidate	Votes	%	±%
Liberal	Leonard Marchand	14,707	35.19	–5.29
Progressive Conservative	Roy Hewson	13,993	33.48	+3.26
New Democratic	John Farr	11,002	26.33	+2.76
Social Credit	Peter Robert Gook	2,089	5.00	–0.74
Total valid votes		41,791	96.79	
Total rejected ballots		1,386	3.21	+2.62
Turnout		43,177	71.33	–5.79
Eligible voters		60,532		
Liberal hold		Swing		–4.28
Source: Library of Parliament

1974 Canadian federal election: Kamloops—Cariboo
Party	Candidate	Votes	%	±%
Liberal	Leonard Marchand	20,474	41.73	+6.54
Progressive Conservative	Donald W. Couch	17,328	35.32	+1.84
New Democratic	Ron H. Anderson	9,478	19.32	–7.01
Social Credit	Laurie Brigden	1,782	3.63	–1.37
Total valid votes		49,062	99.73	
Total rejected ballots		134	0.27	–2.94
Turnout		49,196	71.38	+0.05
Eligible voters		68,925		
Liberal hold		Swing		+2.35
Source: Library of Parliament

== Archives ==
There is a Leonard Marchand fonds at Library and Archives Canada.
