= Gerald Hamilton Anderson =

Canadian politician (1922–2003)

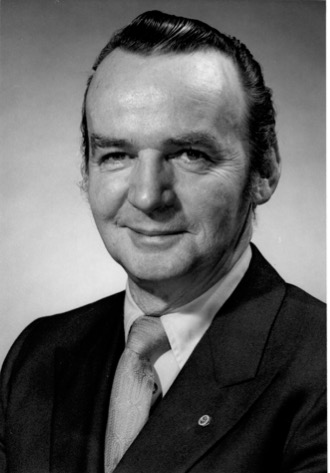

MLA for Kamloops
- In office 1972–1975
- Preceded by: Phil Gaglardi
- Succeeded by: Rafe Mair

Personal details
- Born: April 12, 1922 Regina, Saskatchewan
- Died: October 3, 2003 (aged 81) Kamloops, British Columbia
- Party: British Columbia New Democratic Party
- Spouse: Ingebjorg Magnhild Storseth

Gerald Hamilton Anderson (April 12, 1922 – October 3, 2003) was a Canadian politician. He served in the Legislative Assembly of British Columbia from 1972 to 1975, as a NDP member for the constituency of Kamloops. He was defeated when he ran for re-election in Kamloops in the 1975 provincial election and again in the 1979 provincial election when he ran in the Yale-Lillooet riding.
