= Kamloops—Cariboo =

Former federal electoral district in British Columbia, Canada

British Columbia electoral district

Defunct federal electoral district
- Legislature: House of Commons
- District created: 1966
- District abolished: 1976
- First contested: 1968
- Last contested: 1974

Kamloops—Cariboo was a federal electoral district in British Columbia, Canada, that was represented in the House of Commons of Canada from 1968 to 1979. This riding was created in 1966 from parts of Cariboo and Kamloops ridings.

It was abolished in 1976 when it was redistributed into Cariboo—Chilcotin, Kamloops—Shuswap, Okanagan North, Okanagan—Similkameen and Prince George–Bulkley Valley ridings.

== Members of Parliament ==
Parliament	Years	Member	Party
Riding created from Cariboo and Kamloops
28th	1968–1972	Leonard Marchand	Liberal
29th	1972–1974	Leonard Marchand	Liberal
30th	1974–1979	Leonard Marchand	Liberal
Riding dissolved into Cariboo—Chilcotin, Kamloops—Shuswap, Okanagan North, Okanagan—Similkameen and Prince George—Bulkley Valley

== Election results ==
1974 Canadian federal election
Party	Candidate	Votes	%	±%
Liberal	Leonard Marchand	20,474	41.73	+6.54
Progressive Conservative	Donald W. Couch	17,328	35.32	+1.84
New Democratic	Ron H. Anderson	9,478	19.32	–7.01
Social Credit	Laurie Brigden	1,782	3.63	–1.37
Total valid votes		49,062	99.73	
Total rejected ballots		134	0.27	–2.94
Turnout		49,196	71.38	+0.05
Eligible voters		68,925		
Liberal hold		Swing		+2.35
Source: Library of Parliament

1972 Canadian federal election
Party	Candidate	Votes	%	±%
Liberal	Leonard Marchand	14,707	35.19	–5.29
Progressive Conservative	Roy Hewson	13,993	33.48	+3.26
New Democratic	John Farr	11,002	26.33	+2.76
Social Credit	Peter Robert Gook	2,089	5.00	–0.74
Total valid votes		41,791	96.79	
Total rejected ballots		1,386	3.21	+2.62
Turnout		43,177	71.33	–5.79
Eligible voters		60,532		
Liberal hold		Swing		–4.28
Source: Library of Parliament

1968 Canadian federal election
Party	Candidate	Votes	%	±%
Liberal	Leonard Marchand	13,000	40.48	–
Progressive Conservative	Edmund Davie Fulton	9,704	30.22	–
New Democratic	Vernor Wilfred Jones	7,566	23.56	–
Social Credit	Peter Robert Gook	1,842	5.74	–
Total valid votes		32,112	99.41	
Total rejected ballots		191	0.59	
Turnout		32,303	77.12	
Eligible voters		41,888		
Liberal notional gain		Swing		–
This riding was created from Cariboo and Kamloops, which elected a Social Credit and a Progressive Conservative, respectively, in the last election. Davie Fulton was the incumbent from Kamloops.
Source: Library of Parliament

== See also ==
- List of Canadian electoral districts
- Historical federal electoral districts of Canada
