= Thomas O'Neill (Canadian politician) =

Canadian politician

Member of Parliament for Kamloops
- In office October 1935 – June 1945
- Preceded by: riding created
- Succeeded by: Davie Fulton

Personal details
- Born: Thomas James O'Neill; 2 June 1882 Winnipeg, Manitoba, Canada
- Died: 16 October 1965 (aged 83)
- Party: Liberal
- Spouse: Jessie Currie (m. 1907)
- Profession: Locomotive engineer

Thomas James O'Neill (2 June 1882 – 16 October 1965) was a Liberal party member of the House of Commons of Canada. He was born in Winnipeg, Manitoba and became a locomotive engineer by career.

From 1897 to 1900, he was a member of the Rocky Mountain Rangers. O'Neill was active on various boards and committees, including chairing the British Columbia Railway Legislation Board at one time. He also served on the General Committee of Adjustment for Canadian Pacific Railway. He was an active supporter of labour unions, particularly the Brotherhood of Locomotive Engineers.

O'Neill was first elected to Parliament at the Kamloops riding in the 1935 general election then re-elected in 1940. He was defeated by Davie Fulton of the Progressive Conservative party in the 1945 election. O'Neill was also unsuccessful in unseating Fulton in 1949.
