= Donald Niel Cameron =

Canadian politician

Don Cameron

Member of the Canadian Parliament for Kamloops—Shuswap
- In office 1979–1980
- Succeeded by: Nelson Riis

Personal details
- Born: 17 April 1917 Alexandria, Ontario, Canada
- Died: 24 December 2014 (aged 97) Kamloops, British Columbia, Canada
- Party: Progressive Conservative Party of Canada
- Profession: construction contractor

Donald Niel Cameron (17 April 1917 – 24 December 2014) was a Canadian Progressive Conservative Party politician who served as a member of the House of Commons of Canada. Cameron was a heavy construction contractor by career, and was a veteran of World War II.

He served in only one term of federal office, in the 31st Canadian Parliament, after winning the British Columbia riding of Kamloops—Shuswap in the 1979 federal election. Cameron was defeated by Nelson Riis in the 1980 election. He resided in Kamloops until his death in 2014.
