= Davie Fulton =

Canadian politician

The Honourable Davie Fulton PC OC QC
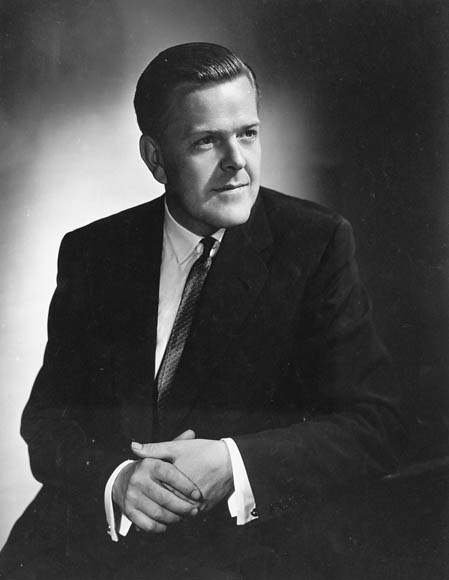

Minister of Public Works
- In office August 9, 1962 – April 21, 1963
- Prime Minister: John Diefenbaker
- Preceded by: Howard Charles Green (acting)
- Succeeded by: Jean-Paul Deschatelets

Minister of Justice Attorney General of Canada
- In office June 21, 1957 – August 8, 1962
- Prime Minister: John Diefenbaker
- Preceded by: Stuart Garson
- Succeeded by: Donald Fleming

Minister of Citizenship and Immigration
- Acting; June 21, 1957 – May 11, 1958
- Prime Minister: John Diefenbaker
- Preceded by: Jack Pickersgill
- Succeeded by: Ellen Fairclough

Member of Parliament for Kamloops
- In office November 8, 1965 – June 24, 1968
- Preceded by: Charles Willoughby
- Succeeded by: Riding dissolved
- In office June 11, 1945 – April 7, 1963
- Preceded by: Thomas O'Neill
- Succeeded by: Charles Willoughby

Personal details
- Born: Edmund Davie Fulton; March 10, 1916 Kamloops, British Columbia, Canada
- Died: May 22, 2000 (aged 84) Vancouver, British Columbia, Canada
- Party: Progressive Conservative
- Spouse: Patricia Mary MacRae (m. 1946)
- Children: 3
- Parent(s): Frederick John Fulton; Winnifred Mary Davie
- Relatives: A. E. B. Davie (maternal grandfather); Theodore Davie (granduncle)
- Profession: Barrister; Solicitor

Edmund Davie Fulton PC OC QC (March 10, 1916 – May 22, 2000) was a Canadian Rhodes Scholar, politician and judge. He was born in Kamloops, British Columbia, the son of politician/lawyer Frederick John Fulton and Winnifred M. Davie, daughter of A. E. B. Davie. He was the youngest of 4 children.

== Military career ==
Davie Fulton served in the Second World War with the Canadian Army overseas as Platoon and Company Commander with Seaforth Highlanders of Canada, and as Deputy Assistant Adjutant-General with the 1st Canadian Infantry Division in the Italian and Northwestern Europe campaigns. His brother John "Moose" Fulton distinguished himself in the Royal Canadian Air Force during World War II. He went missing in action in late 1942, and in 1943 Kamloops adopted the Moose Squadron in honour of its commander. In 1944 the Kamloops airport was dedicated as Fulton Field.

== Political career ==
He was brought home from the war by the Conservative Party and won a seat by 100 votes in the House of Commons of Canada in the 1945 general election.

In 1949, he introduced legislation to criminalize the publication, distribution, and sale of crime comics, as the result of a murder by two Yukon teens that was blamed on the influence of the crime comics which the perpetrators had read. Crime comics remained prohibited in Canada until 2018, when Bill C-51 became law.

He ran for the leadership of the Progressive Conservative Party of Canada at the 1956 leadership convention, placing third behind John Diefenbaker.

When Diefenbaker led the party to victory in the 1957 election, he appointed Fulton to Cabinet as Minister of Justice. As Minister, Fulton was involved in negotiations to patriate the Canadian Constitution, and developed the "Fulton–Favreau formula". In 1962, he became Minister of Public Works. His cousin, Albert McPhillips, was Parliamentary Secretary to the Minister of Fisheries around this time.

He resigned from Cabinet in 1963, when he decided to leave federal politics and take the leadership of the British Columbia Progressive Conservative Party. His efforts to revive the provincial Tories in BC were a failure, and he returned to the House of Commons in the 1965 election.

Fulton stood as a candidate at the 1967 federal PC leadership convention, and placed third behind Robert Stanfield and Dufferin Roblin.

After losing his seat in the 1968 election, he retired from politics and returned to the law. In 1973, he became a justice on the British Columbia Supreme Court, and served until 1981, resigning as a result of impaired driving conviction.

== Resigning from the B.C. Supreme Court ==
Fulton tenure ended in 1982 with his resignation to then Justice Minister, Jean Chretien. Issue relating to charges of drunk driving, as well as stress resulting from false allegation of his engaging in prostitution, known as the Wendy King Case caused him to resign. The ghost writer and publisher of The Wendy King Story, apologized in court, "saying it was a case of mistaken identity." King also admitted the same in court,

This libel action has its origin in the fact that I sincerely believed that the plaintiff, Justice E. Davie Fulton, was on one occasion a client of mine in my professional capacity as a prostitute,' King's statement read. As a result of evidence recently disclosed to me, I now realize that I was in error in believing that I had ever met Justice Fulton or that I had associated with him in any way.

Fulton stated that stress from these false allegation had caused his drinking,

Because of the strain and emotional turmoil of this libel action, my problem with alcohol has come back in concentrated form.

In February 1979, as a result drinking and driving incident and an automobile accident, Fulton had his license suspended. During the stop, Fulton "admitted he had used 'intemperate language'," telling the police to "Go to hell." He was involved in a hit-and-run incident, also in February 1979, where the "owner of the vehicle involved told police he had followed the hit-and-run car...to the judge's house." In March 1979, Fulton pled guilty to drinking and driving charges.

The 1981 drinking-and-driving incident was a second offence; he received a $700 fine and a mandatory 14 days in jail. He was also disbarred from the B.C. Law Society.

== Later life ==
From 1986 to 1992, Fulton served as a commissioner on the International Joint Commission. In 1992, he was made an Officer of the Order of Canada.

He died in Vancouver on May 22, 2000.

== Election results ==
1945 Canadian federal election: Kamloops
Party	Candidate	Votes	%	±%
Progressive Conservative	Davie Fulton	4,401	33.09	+1.19
Liberal	Thomas O'Neill	4,229	31.80	–10.00
Co-operative Commonwealth	Francis James McKenzie	4,003	30.10	+3.79
Labor–Progressive	John Henry Codd	666	5.01	–
Total valid votes		13,299	98.66	
Total rejected ballots		181	1.34	+0.29
Turnout		13,480	84.82	+0.82
Eligible voters		15,892		
Progressive Conservative gain from Liberal		Swing		+5.60
Source: Library of Parliament

1949 Canadian federal election: Kamloops
Party	Candidate	Votes	%	±%
Progressive Conservative	Davie Fulton	7,682	40.07	+6.98
Liberal	Thomas O'Neill	6,399	33.38	+1.58
Co-operative Commonwealth	George Victor Larson	5,091	26.55	–3.55
Total valid votes		19,172	99.36	
Total rejected ballots		123	0.64	–0.71
Turnout		19,295	74.11	–10.71
Eligible voters		26,035		
Progressive Conservative hold		Swing		+2.70
Source: Library of Parliament

1953 Canadian federal election: Kamloops
Party	Candidate	Votes	%	±%
Progressive Conservative	Davie Fulton	7,578	46.69	+6.63
Social Credit	Clarence Aubrey Wright	3,780	23.29	–
Liberal	Kenneth Durward Houghton	2,731	16.83	–16.55
Co-operative Commonwealth	Austin Kenneth Greenway	2,140	13.19	–13.37
Total valid votes		16,229	98.65	
Total rejected ballots		222	1.35	+0.71
Turnout		16,451	65.35	–8.77
Eligible voters		25,175		
Progressive Conservative hold		Swing		–8.68
Source: Library of Parliament

1957 Canadian federal election: Kamloops
Party	Candidate	Votes	%	±%
Progressive Conservative	Davie Fulton	10,029	47.24	+0.55
Social Credit	Walter James Smith	5,858	27.59	+4.30
Liberal	Arnold McIntyre Affleck	3,383	15.94	–0.89
Co-operative Commonwealth	Austin Kenneth Greenway	1,959	9.23	–3.96
Total valid votes		21,229	99.29	
Total rejected ballots		152	0.71	–0.64
Turnout		21,381	73.16	+7.81
Eligible voters		29,225		
Progressive Conservative hold		Swing		–1.88
Source: Library of Parliament

1958 Canadian federal election: Kamloops
Party	Candidate	Votes	%	±%
Progressive Conservative	Davie Fulton	13,858	63.30	+16.06
Liberal	Arnold McIntyre Affleck	2,868	13.10	–2.84
Co-operative Commonwealth	Austin Kenneth Greenway	2,777	12.68	+3.46
Social Credit	Earl Victor Roy Merrick	2,390	10.92	–16.68
Total valid votes		21,893	99.35	
Total rejected ballots		143	0.65	–0.06
Turnout		22,036	70.62	–2.54
Eligible voters		31,202		
Progressive Conservative hold		Swing		+9.76
Source: Library of Parliament

1962 Canadian federal election: Kamloops
Party	Candidate	Votes	%	±%
Progressive Conservative	Davie Fulton	11,312	43.13	–20.17
Liberal	Jarl Whist	5,789	22.07	+8.97
New Democratic	Walter D. Inglis	4,733	18.05	+5.36
Social Credit	Clarence Aubrey Wright	4,393	16.75	+5.83
Total valid votes		26,227	99.18	
Total rejected ballots		216	0.82	+0.17
Turnout		26,443	72.79	+2.16
Eligible voters		36,329		
Progressive Conservative hold		Swing		–14.57
Change for the New Democrats is based on the Co-operative Commonwealth.
Source: Library of Parliament

1963 British Columbia general election: Kamloops
Party	Candidate	Votes	%
Social Credit	Philip Arthur Gaglardi	5,669	47.17%
Progressive Conservative	Edmund Davie Fulton	4,473	37.22%
New Democratic	Lance Randle	1,297	10.79%
Liberal	Henry Maxwell Smith	580	4.83%
Total valid votes		12,019	100.00%
Total rejected ballots		71	

1965 Canadian federal election: Kamloops
Party	Candidate	Votes	%	±%
Progressive Conservative	Davie Fulton	11,731	37.39	+7.94
New Democratic	Vernor Wilfred Jones	7,132	22.73	–0.75
Liberal	Albert John Edward Chilton	6,757	21.54	–7.07
Social Credit	Thomas Daly Sills	5,756	18.35	–0.12
Total valid votes		31,376	99.42	
Total rejected ballots		183	0.58	–0.15
Turnout		31,559	74.71	–2.77
Eligible voters		42,240		
Progressive Conservative hold		Swing		+4.34
Source: Library of Parliament

1968 Canadian federal election: Kamloops—Cariboo
Party	Candidate	Votes	%	±%
Liberal	Leonard Marchand	13,000	40.48	–
Progressive Conservative	Edmund Davie Fulton	9,704	30.22	–
New Democratic	Vernor Wilfred Jones	7,566	23.56	–
Social Credit	Peter Robert Gook	1,842	5.74	–
Total valid votes		32,112	99.41	
Total rejected ballots		191	0.59	
Turnout		32,303	77.12	
Eligible voters		41,888		
Liberal notional gain		Swing		–
This riding was created from Cariboo and Kamloops, which elected a Social Credit and a Progressive Conservative, respectively, in the last election. Davie Fulton was the incumbent from Kamloops.
Source: Library of Parliament

== Archives ==
There is a Davie Fulton fonds at Library and Archives Canada.

Political offices
Preceded by Stuart Garson	Minister of Justice; 1957–1962	Succeeded by Donald Fleming
Preceded by Jack Pickersgill	Minister of Citizenship and Immigration; 1957–1958	Succeeded by Ellen Fairclough
Preceded by Howard Charles Green	Minister of Public Works; 1962–1963	Succeeded by Jean-Paul Deschatelets
Party political offices
Preceded by Deane Finlayson	Leader of the BC Conservative Party; 1963–1965	Succeeded by John Anthony St. Etienne DeWolf
