= Throw the cat among the pigeons =

British idiom

Throwing (also putting and setting) the cat among the pigeons (also amongst the pigeons) is a British idiom used to describe a disturbance caused by an undesirable person from the perspective of a group.

Another use of the term is to "cause an enormous fight or flap, usually by revealing a controversial fact or secret", or in other words: to do something suddenly or unexpectedly which leaves the people worried or angry. The key point being the making explicit a controversial or precarious paradigm or settlement.

== History and usage ==
The phrase originally referred to the disturbance likely to be created by putting a cat inside a dovecote (or dove house). This disturbance is caused by the cat's tendency to hunt and kill the birds, only made easier by their close proximity.

=== Similarity in other languages and cultures ===
In Dutch, the same meaning is expressed in the proverb "De knuppel in het hoenderhok gooien," literally translated to "Throwing the bat into the chicken shed." Whilst being similar to other idioms, in this case there is an element of aggression, and a power differential becomes the key element in the undesirability. The Spanish-language version of the phrase is alborotar a todo el palomar, "to disturb the dovecote". In Russian, there is a proverb similar in meaning "пустить козла в огород" (let a goat into the garden).

In colonial India, a popular pastime was to put a wild cat in a pen with pigeons. Bets would be made on how many birds the cat would bring down with one paw-swipe. The period of the British colonisation of India may have introduced this concept, and hence the phrase to the English language.

In French-language, similar meaning is expressed as "Jeter un pavé dans la mare" or "Lancer un pavé dans la mare", ("Throwing a cobblestone in the pond"). It illustrates a provocation disrupting a situation that is commonly considered as calm and established (pond represents calm water) while seeking for a reaction of those considering so (who are splashed by the pond content).

== In literature and the arts ==
Cat Among the Pigeons (1959) is the title of a detective-fiction novel by English writer Agatha Christie.

== See also ==
- List of idioms in the English language
