= Frederick William Anderson (politician) =

Canadian politician

Frederick William Anderson (September 28, 1883 – April 28, 1955) was a civil engineer, rancher and political figure in British Columbia. He represented Kamloops in the Legislative Assembly of British Columbia from 1916 to 1924, as a Liberal.

He was born in Ottawa, Ontario, the son of William Anderson, and was educated in Ottawa and at McGill University. After working on a number of large construction projects across Canada, Anderson moved to Kamloops, British Columbia, where he operated a farm and raised livestock. He married Marion Claire, the daughter of Gordon Edward Corbould. Anderson served as government whip in the assembly. He was a lieutenant in the Canadian Engineers of the Canadian Expeditionary Force. Anderson died in Vancouver at the age of 71.
