= Kamloops (federal electoral district) =

Former federal electoral district in British Columbia, Canada

British Columbia electoral district

Defunct federal electoral district
- Legislature: House of Commons
- District created: 1988
- District abolished: 2004
- First contested: 1988
- Last contested: 2000

Kamloops was a federal electoral district in British Columbia, Canada, that was represented in the House of Commons of Canada from 1935 to 1968, and from 1988 to 2004. From 1998 to 2004, it was known as Kamloops, Thompson and Highland Valleys.

== History ==
This riding was created in 1935 from parts of Cariboo and Kootenay West ridings. It was abolished in 1966 when it was redistributed into Coast Chilcotin, Fraser Valley East, Kamloops—Cariboo, Okanagan—Kootenay and Prince George—Peace River ridings.

In 1987, a new Kamloops riding was created from parts of Kamloops—Shuswap riding. In 1998, it was renamed "Kamloops, Thompson and Highland Valleys".

It consisted of:

- Electoral Areas A, B, J, L, O and P of the Thompson-Nicola Regional District;
- The City of Kamloops;
- the Village of Chase; and
- the District Municipality of Logan Lake.

It was redefined in 1996 to consist of:

- Subdivisions A, B and E of Thompson-Nicola Regional District, including Skeetchestn Indian Reserve and Logan Lake District Municipality, excepting Spatsum Indian Reserve No. 11;
- the City of Kamloops; and
- Kamloops Indian Reserve No. 1.

In 2003, the riding was abolished, and a new riding, "Kamloops—Thompson", was created with substantially the same boundaries. In 2005, this district was renamed "Kamloops—Thompson—Cariboo".

== Members of Parliament ==
This riding elected the following members of Parliament:

Parliament	Years	Member	Party
Kamloops; Riding created from Cariboo and Kootenay West
18th	1935–1940	Thomas O'Neill	Liberal
19th	1940–1945	Thomas O'Neill	Liberal
20th	1945–1949	Davie Fulton	Progressive Conservative
21st	1949–1953	Davie Fulton	Progressive Conservative
22nd	1953–1957	Davie Fulton	Progressive Conservative
23rd	1957–1958	Davie Fulton	Progressive Conservative
24th	1958–1962	Davie Fulton	Progressive Conservative
25th	1962–1963	Davie Fulton	Progressive Conservative
26th	1963–1965	Charles Willoughby	Progressive Conservative
27th	1965–1968	Davie Fulton	Progressive Conservative
Riding dissolved into Coast Chilcotin, Fraser Valley East, Kamloops—Cariboo, Okanagan—Kootenay and Prince George—Peace River
Riding re-created from Kamloops—Shuswap
34th	1988–1993	Nelson Riis	New Democratic
35th	1993–1997	Nelson Riis	New Democratic
36th	1997–2000	Nelson Riis	New Democratic
Kamloops, Thompson and Highland Valleys
37th	2000–2004	Betty Hinton	Alliance
Riding dissolved into Kamloops—Thompson

== Election results ==
2000 Canadian federal election: Kamloops, Thompson and Highland Valleys
Party	Candidate	Votes	%	±%	Expenditures
Alliance	Betty Hinton	23,578	48.59	+19.70	$52,370
New Democratic	Nelson Riis	13,600	28.03	–8.04	$52,389
Liberal	Jon Moser	7,582	15.63	–16.21	$58,449
Progressive Conservative	Randy Patch	3,217	6.63	+4.40	$18,401
Canadian Action	Ernie Schmidt	544	1.12	–	$2,180
Total valid votes		48,521	99.76		
Total rejected ballots		117	0.24		
Turnout		48,638	67.38		
Eligible voters		72,188			
Alliance gain from New Democratic		Swing		+13.87	
Change for the Canadian Alliance is based on the Reform Party.
Source: Elections Canada

=== Kamloops, 1987–1998 ===
1997 Canadian federal election
Party	Candidate	Votes	%	±%	Expenditures
New Democratic	Nelson Riis	16,138	36.07	–0.22	$52,988
Liberal	Joel Groves	14,244	31.83	+7.49	$58,887
Reform	Fred Bosman	12,928	28.89	+2.13	$45,611
Progressive Conservative	Donald Niel Cameron	999	2.23	–6.48	$13,522
Green	Donald Stuart Rennie	437	0.98	–	none listed
Total valid votes		44,746	99.72		
Total rejected ballots		126	0.28	–0.10	
Turnout		44,872	67.32	–1.77	
Eligible voters		66,657			
New Democratic hold		Swing		–3.86	
Source: Elections Canada

1993 Canadian federal election
Party	Candidate	Votes	%	±%
New Democratic	Nelson Riis	16,063	36.28	–16.01
Reform	Keith Raddatz	11,847	26.76	+25.60
Liberal	Kevin Krueger	10,776	24.34	+11.19
Progressive Conservative	Frank Coldicott	3,857	8.71	–23.69
National	Kathrine Wunderlich	1,399	3.16	–
Natural Law	Mark McCooey	133	0.30	–
Libertarian	Randall Edge	109	0.25	–
Canada Party	Marion Munday	45	0.10	–
Independent	Thomas Brown	41	0.09	–
Total valid votes		44,270	99.62	
Total rejected ballots		169	0.38	–0.03
Turnout		44,439	69.09	–9.65
Eligible voters		64,324		
New Democratic hold		Swing		–20.81
Source: Elections Canada

1988 Canadian federal election
Party	Candidate	Votes	%	±%
New Democratic	Nelson Riis	21,513	52.30	–
Progressive Conservative	Russ Cundari	13,328	32.40	–
Liberal	Gus Halliday	5,412	13.16	–
Reform	Ted Maskell	477	1.16	–
Green	Trudy M. Frisk	263	0.64	–
Communist	Valerie Adrienne Carey	77	0.19	–
Independent	Carl A. Grant	67	0.16	–
Total valid votes		41,137	99.59	
Total rejected ballots		170	0.41	
Turnout		41,307	78.74	
Eligible voters		52,463		
New Democratic notional hold		Swing		–
This riding was created from parts of Kamloops—Shuswap, with New Democrat Nelson Riis being the incumbent.
Source: Elections Canada

=== Kamloops, 1933–1966 ===
1965 Canadian federal election
Party	Candidate	Votes	%	±%
Progressive Conservative	Davie Fulton	11,731	37.39	+7.94
New Democratic	Vernor Wilfred Jones	7,132	22.73	–0.75
Liberal	Albert John Edward Chilton	6,757	21.54	–7.07
Social Credit	Thomas Daly Sills	5,756	18.35	–0.12
Total valid votes		31,376	99.42	
Total rejected ballots		183	0.58	–0.15
Turnout		31,559	74.71	–2.77
Eligible voters		42,240		
Progressive Conservative hold		Swing		+4.34
Source: Library of Parliament

1963 Canadian federal election
Party	Candidate	Votes	%	±%
Progressive Conservative	Charles Willoughby	8,604	29.45	–13.68
Liberal	Jarl Whist	8,359	28.61	+6.54
New Democratic	Vernor W. Jones	6,860	23.48	+5.43
Social Credit	Clarence Aubrey Wright	5,394	18.46	+1.71
Total valid votes		29,217	99.27	
Total rejected ballots		216	0.73	–0.08
Turnout		29,433	77.48	+4.69
Eligible voters		37,988		
Progressive Conservative hold		Swing		–10.11
Source: Library of Parliament

1962 Canadian federal election
Party	Candidate	Votes	%	±%
Progressive Conservative	Davie Fulton	11,312	43.13	–20.17
Liberal	Jarl Whist	5,789	22.07	+8.97
New Democratic	Walter D. Inglis	4,733	18.05	+5.36
Social Credit	Clarence Aubrey Wright	4,393	16.75	+5.83
Total valid votes		26,227	99.18	
Total rejected ballots		216	0.82	+0.17
Turnout		26,443	72.79	+2.16
Eligible voters		36,329		
Progressive Conservative hold		Swing		–14.57
Change for the New Democrats is based on the Co-operative Commonwealth.
Source: Library of Parliament

1958 Canadian federal election
Party	Candidate	Votes	%	±%
Progressive Conservative	Davie Fulton	13,858	63.30	+16.06
Liberal	Arnold McIntyre Affleck	2,868	13.10	–2.84
Co-operative Commonwealth	Austin Kenneth Greenway	2,777	12.68	+3.46
Social Credit	Earl Victor Roy Merrick	2,390	10.92	–16.68
Total valid votes		21,893	99.35	
Total rejected ballots		143	0.65	–0.06
Turnout		22,036	70.62	–2.54
Eligible voters		31,202		
Progressive Conservative hold		Swing		+9.76
Source: Library of Parliament

1957 Canadian federal election
Party	Candidate	Votes	%	±%
Progressive Conservative	Davie Fulton	10,029	47.24	+0.55
Social Credit	Walter James Smith	5,858	27.59	+4.30
Liberal	Arnold McIntyre Affleck	3,383	15.94	–0.89
Co-operative Commonwealth	Austin Kenneth Greenway	1,959	9.23	–3.96
Total valid votes		21,229	99.29	
Total rejected ballots		152	0.71	–0.64
Turnout		21,381	73.16	+7.81
Eligible voters		29,225		
Progressive Conservative hold		Swing		–1.88
Source: Library of Parliament

1953 Canadian federal election
Party	Candidate	Votes	%	±%
Progressive Conservative	Davie Fulton	7,578	46.69	+6.63
Social Credit	Clarence Aubrey Wright	3,780	23.29	–
Liberal	Kenneth Durward Houghton	2,731	16.83	–16.55
Co-operative Commonwealth	Austin Kenneth Greenway	2,140	13.19	–13.37
Total valid votes		16,229	98.65	
Total rejected ballots		222	1.35	+0.71
Turnout		16,451	65.35	–8.77
Eligible voters		25,175		
Progressive Conservative hold		Swing		–8.68
Source: Library of Parliament

1949 Canadian federal election
Party	Candidate	Votes	%	±%
Progressive Conservative	Davie Fulton	7,682	40.07	+6.98
Liberal	Thomas O'Neill	6,399	33.38	+1.58
Co-operative Commonwealth	George Victor Larson	5,091	26.55	–3.55
Total valid votes		19,172	99.36	
Total rejected ballots		123	0.64	–0.71
Turnout		19,295	74.11	–10.71
Eligible voters		26,035		
Progressive Conservative hold		Swing		+2.70
Source: Library of Parliament

1945 Canadian federal election
Party	Candidate	Votes	%	±%
Progressive Conservative	Davie Fulton	4,401	33.09	+1.19
Liberal	Thomas O'Neill	4,229	31.80	–10.00
Co-operative Commonwealth	Francis James McKenzie	4,003	30.10	+3.79
Labor–Progressive	John Henry Codd	666	5.01	–
Total valid votes		13,299	98.66	
Total rejected ballots		181	1.34	+0.29
Turnout		13,480	84.82	+0.82
Eligible voters		15,892		
Progressive Conservative gain from Liberal		Swing		+5.60
Source: Library of Parliament

1940 Canadian federal election
Party	Candidate	Votes	%	±%
Liberal	Thomas O'Neill	5,621	41.79	+4.28
National Government	Henry Herbert Stevens	4,290	31.90	+5.27
Co-operative Commonwealth	Margaret Macnab	3,538	26.31	+0.16
Total valid votes		13,449	98.95	
Total rejected ballots		143	1.05	–0.08
Turnout		13,592	84.00	+13.10
Eligible voters		16,180		
Liberal hold		Swing		–0.50
Source: Library of Parliament

1935 Canadian federal election
Party	Candidate	Votes	%	±%
Liberal	Thomas O'Neill	4,190	37.52	–
Conservative	William James Moffatt	2,974	26.63	–
Co-operative Commonwealth	George Faulds Stirling	2,920	26.15	–
Reconstruction	George Henry Ellis	1,084	9.71	–
Total valid votes		11,168	98.87	
Total rejected ballots		128	1.13	
Turnout		11,296	70.91	
Eligible voters		15,931		
Liberal notional gain from Conservative		Swing		–
This riding was created from Cariboo and Kootenay West, both of which elected a Conservative in the last election.
Source: Library of Parliament

== See also ==
- List of Canadian electoral districts
- Historical federal electoral districts of Canada
