= Electorate opinion polling and projections for the 2025 Australian federal election =

The 2025 Australian federal election was held on 3 May 2025 to elect 150 seats of the House of Representatives and 40 out of the 76 Senate seats. At the election, the Albanese government was elected to a second term of government in a landslide victory, substantially increasing its majority in the Parliament of Australia. Various research and polling firms conducted opinion polling before the election in individual electorates across Australia, relating to voting intentions in the House of Representatives. Several firms also conducted MRP polls, which are projections based on national data, rather than polls in the relevant electorate.

== Australian Capital Territory ==
=== Bean ===
Date	Firm	Sample size	Margin of error	Primary vote						2CP vote		
Date	Firm	Sample size	Margin of error	ALP	LIB	GRN	IND	ONP	OTH	ALP	IND	LIB
3 May 2025	2025 federal election			41.1%	23.0%	9.5%	26.4%	—	—	50.3%	49.7%	—
1 – 29 Apr 2025	YouGov (MRP)	10,822	—N/a	41.9%	30.2%	15.2%	12.8%	—N/a	—N/a	62%	—N/a	38%
3 Feb – 1 Apr 2025	Accent/RedBridge (MRP)	9,953	—N/a	41%	31%	14%	—N/a	—N/a	13%	62%	—N/a	38%
27 Feb – 26 Mar 2025	YouGov (MRP)	10,217	—N/a	38.1%	29.1%	15.7%	11.9%	4%	1.3%	59.5%	—N/a	40.5%
22 Jan – 12 Feb 2025	YouGov (MRP)	8,732	—N/a	36%	32.9%	12.9%	11%	6.2%	1%	55.2%	—N/a	44.8%
29 Oct – 20 Nov 2024	Accent/RedBridge (MRP)	4,909	—N/a	38%	33%	21%	—N/a	—N/a	8%	61%	—N/a	39%
10 Jul – 27 Aug 2024	Accent/RedBridge (MRP)	5,976	—N/a	40%	32%	18%	—N/a	—N/a	11%	62%	—N/a	38%
Feb – May 2024	Accent/RedBridge (MRP)	4,040	—N/a	41%	30%	17%	—N/a	—N/a	12%	63%	—N/a	37%
21 May 2022	2022 federal election			41.7%	29.7%	14.8%	8.2%	2.7%	2.9%	63%	—	37%

=== Canberra ===
Date	Firm	Sample size	Margin of error	Primary vote						2CP vote	
Date	Firm	Sample size	Margin of error	ALP	GRN	LIB	IND	ONP	OTH	ALP	GRN
3 May 2025	2025 federal election			48.3%	19.8%	18.3%	10.9%	—	2.7%	69.5%	30.5%
1 – 29 Apr 2025	YouGov (MRP)	10,822	—N/a	43.3%	25.7%	19.7%	8.6%	—N/a	2.6%	60.1%	39.9%
3 Feb – 1 Apr 2025	Accent/RedBridge (MRP)	9,953	—N/a	50%	19%	24%	—N/a	—N/a	7%	68%	32%
27 Feb – 26 Mar 2025	YouGov (MRP)	10,217	—N/a	39.9%	25.1%	21.3%	9.9%	2.6%	1.2%	59.8%	40.2%
22 Jan – 12 Feb 2025	YouGov (MRP)	8,732	—N/a	41.4%	24.6%	21.4%	8%	3.7%	0.8%	64.3%	35.7%
29 Oct – 20 Nov 2024	Accent/RedBridge (MRP)	4,909	—N/a	48%	26%	19%	—N/a	—N/a	7%	67%	33%
10 Jul – 27 Aug 2024	Accent/RedBridge (MRP)	5,976	—N/a	45%	19%	24%	—N/a	—N/a	12%	66%	34%
Feb – May 2024	Accent/RedBridge (MRP)	4,040	—N/a	44%	26%	23%	—N/a	—N/a	7%	62%	38%
21 May 2022	2022 federal election			44.9%	24.7%	21.8%	5.2%	1.7%	1.8%	62.2%	37.8%

=== Fenner ===
Date	Firm	Sample size	Margin of error	Primary vote						2PP vote	
Date	Firm	Sample size	Margin of error	ALP	LIB	GRN	ONP	IND	OTH	ALP	LIB
3 May 2025	2025 federal election			53.8%	21.9%	16.4%	—	—	7.9%	72.1%	27.9%
1 – 29 Apr 2025	YouGov (MRP)	10,822	—N/a	51.1%	27.7%	16.8%	—N/a	—N/a	4.4%	66.6%	33.4%
3 Feb – 1 Apr 2025	Accent/RedBridge (MRP)	9,953	—N/a	40%	27%	18%	—N/a	—N/a	15%	61%	39%
27 Feb – 26 Mar 2025	YouGov (MRP)	10,217	—N/a	40.5%	28.7%	18.5%	5.6%	4.6%	2.1%	61.1%	38.9%
22 Jan – 12 Feb 2025	YouGov (MRP)	8,732	—N/a	42.2%	30%	15.1%	6.2%	5.3%	1.1%	59.8%	40.2%
29 Oct – 20 Nov 2024	Accent/RedBridge (MRP)	4,909	—N/a	37%	31%	16%	—N/a	—N/a	16%	57%	43%
10 Jul – 27 Aug 2024	Accent/RedBridge (MRP)	5,976	—N/a	40%	34%	13%	—N/a	—N/a	13%	56%	44%
Feb – May 2024	Accent/RedBridge (MRP)	4,040	—N/a	45%	29%	19%	—N/a	—N/a	7%	66%	34%
21 May 2022	2022 federal election			48.3%	27.8%	16.8%	2.7%	—	4.4%	65.7%	34.3%

== New South Wales ==
=== Banks ===
Date	Firm	Sample size	Margin of error	Primary vote						2PP vote	
Date	Firm	Sample size	Margin of error	LIB	ALP	GRN	ONP	IND	OTH	LIB	ALP
3 May 2025	2025 federal election			39.1%	36.4%	11.9%	3.7%	2.0%	6.9%	47.6%	52.4%
1 – 29 Apr 2025	YouGov (MRP)	10,822	—N/a	36%	34%	10.3%	7.5%	2.7%	9.4%	49.6%	50.4%
27 Feb – 26 Mar 2025	YouGov (MRP)	10,217	—N/a	42.2%	32.2%	10.7%	6.2%	4.8%	3.9%	52.5%	47.5%
22 Jan – 12 Feb 2025	YouGov (MRP)	8,732	—N/a	44.4%	29.9%	10.5%	6.3%	6.7%	2.1%	54.8%	45.2%
29 Oct – 20 Nov 2024	Accent/RedBridge (MRP)	4,909	—N/a	49%	32%	7%	—N/a	—N/a	12%	57%	43%
10 Jul – 27 Aug 2024	Accent/RedBridge (MRP)	5,976	—N/a	49%	33%	5%	—N/a	—N/a	14%	58%	42%
21 May 2022	2022 federal election			45.2%	35.3%	8.8%	2.9%	1%	6.9%	53.2%	46.8%

=== Barton ===
Date	Firm	Sample size	Margin of error	Primary vote						2PP vote	
Date	Firm	Sample size	Margin of error	ALP	LIB	GRN	ONP	IND	OTH	ALP	LIB
3 May 2025	2025 federal election			47.1%	24.2%	15.9%	5.6%	—	7.2%	66.0%	34.0%
27 Feb – 26 Mar 2025	YouGov (MRP)	10,217	—N/a	38.9%	32.3%	13.5%	8.1%	3.9%	3.2%	56.3%	43.7%
22 Jan – 12 Feb 2025	YouGov (MRP)	8,732	—N/a	38.5%	33.8%	13.2%	6.8%	5.8%	1.9%	55.4%	44.6%
29 Oct – 20 Nov 2024	Accent/RedBridge (MRP)	4,909	—N/a	40%	33%	14%	—N/a	—N/a	13%	57%	43%
10 Jul – 27 Aug 2024	Accent/RedBridge (MRP)	5,976	—N/a	45%	36%	8%	—N/a	—N/a	11%	56%	44%
21 May 2022	2022 federal election			50.4%	26.2%	12.5%	4.8%	—	6.1%	65.5%	34.5%

=== Bennelong ===
Date	Firm	Sample size	Margin of error	Primary vote						2PP vote	
Date	Firm	Sample size	Margin of error	LIB	ALP	GRN	ONP	IND	OTH	ALP	LIB
3 May 2025	2025 federal election			35.1%	45.3%	11.8%	2.3%	—	5.5%	59.3%	40.7%
27 Feb – 26 Mar 2025	YouGov (MRP)	10,217	—N/a	40.7%	31%	12.8%	4.4%	5.2%	5.8%	48.6%	51.4%
22 Jan – 12 Feb 2025	YouGov (MRP)	8,732	—N/a	43.8%	29.4%	11.2%	6.3%	5.9%	3.4%	45.4%	54.6%
29 Oct – 20 Nov 2024	Accent/RedBridge (MRP)	4,909	—N/a	46%	33%	13%	—N/a	—N/a	8%	46%	54%
10 Jul – 27 Aug 2024	Accent/RedBridge (MRP)	5,976	—N/a	41%	36%	11%	—N/a	—N/a	12%	49%	51%
21 May 2022	2022 federal election			41.4%	37.7%	11.4%	1.7%	—	7.8%	51%	49%

=== Berowra ===
Date	Firm	Sample size	Margin of error	Primary vote						2PP vote	
Date	Firm	Sample size	Margin of error	LIB	ALP	GRN	ONP	IND	OTH	LIB	ALP
3 May 2025	2025 federal election			41.7%	27.0%	11.9%	4.1%	11.4%	3.9%	51.6%	48.4%
27 Feb – 26 Mar 2025	YouGov (MRP)	10,217	—N/a	44.1%	23.8%	14.8%	4.8%	8.4%	4%	55.8%	44.2%
22 Jan – 12 Feb 2025	YouGov (MRP)	8,732	—N/a	48.4%	24%	12.6%	4.9%	8.4%	1.6%	58.7%	41.3%
29 Oct – 20 Nov 2024	Accent/RedBridge (MRP)	4,909	—N/a	49%	29%	10%	—N/a	—N/a	13%	58%	42%
10 Jul – 27 Aug 2024	Accent/RedBridge (MRP)	5,976	—N/a	48%	28%	11%	—N/a	—N/a	13%	58%	42%
21 May 2022	2022 federal election			49.1%	22.2%	15.6%	3.2%	2.9%	7%	59.8%	40.2%

=== Blaxland ===
Date	Firm	Sample size	Margin of error	Primary vote						2PP vote	
Date	Firm	Sample size	Margin of error	ALP	LIB	GRN	ONP	IND	OTH	ALP	LIB
3 May 2025	2025 federal election			46.0%	19.6%	7.9%	3.5%	18.8%	4.2%	71.8%	28.1%
27 Feb – 26 Mar 2025	YouGov (MRP)	10,217	—N/a	39.1%	30.5%	12%	10.1%	3.8%	4.5%	56.5%	43.5%
22 Jan – 12 Feb 2025	YouGov (MRP)	8,732	—N/a	39.1%	29.9%	14.2%	8.1%	5.8%	2.9%	57.7%	42.3%
29 Oct – 20 Nov 2024	Accent/RedBridge (MRP)	4,909	—N/a	43%	35%	10%	—N/a	—N/a	13%	56%	44%
10 Jul – 27 Aug 2024	Accent/RedBridge (MRP)	5,976	—N/a	41%	31%	10%	—N/a	—N/a	18%	56%	44%
21 May 2022	2022 federal election			55%	27%	6.4%	5.4%	—	6.3%	64.9%	35.1%

=== Bradfield ===
Date	Firm	Sample size	Margin of error	Primary vote						2CP vote	
Date	Firm	Sample size	Margin of error	LIB	IND	ALP	GRN	ONP	OTH	LIB	IND
3 May 2025	2025 federal election			38.0%	27.0%	20.3%	6.7%	1.6%	6.4%	49.99%	50.01%
1 – 29 Apr 2025	YouGov (MRP)	10,822	—N/a	27.9%	47.8%	12.3%	7.2%	2.9%	1.9%	35.5%	64.5%
27 Feb – 26 Mar 2025	YouGov (MRP)	10,217	—N/a	39.4%	27.7%	20.4%	8.8%	3.1%	0.7%	50.1%	49.9%
3 Feb 2025	Climate 200	1,047	±3%	40%	—N/a	—N/a	—N/a	—N/a	—N/a	48%	52%
Mar – Dec 2024	Climate 200	—N/a	—N/a	43%	—N/a	—N/a	—N/a	—N/a	—N/a	—N/a	—N/a
22 Jan – 12 Feb 2025	YouGov (MRP)	8,732	—N/a	41.7%	23.9%	19.7%	10.1%	4.1%	0.5%	51.9%	48.1%
29 Oct – 20 Nov 2024	Accent/RedBridge (MRP)	4,909	—N/a	47%	—N/a	16%	6%	—N/a	32%	53%	47%
10 Jul – 27 Aug 2024	Accent/RedBridge (MRP)	5,976	—N/a	50%	—N/a	16%	6%	—N/a	27%	56%	44%
Feb – May 2024	Accent/RedBridge (MRP)	4,040	—N/a	51%	—N/a	22%	11%	—N/a	15%	61%	39%
21 May 2022	2022 federal election			45.1%	24%	17.5%	9.3%	1.6%	2.6%	54.2%	45.8%

=== Calare ===
Date	Firm	Sample size	Margin of error	Primary vote						2CP vote		
Date	Firm	Sample size	Margin of error	NAT	IND	ALP	ONP	GRN	OTH	NAT	IND	IND
3 May 2025	2025 federal election			29.7%	39.5% (Note: 23.7% for Andrew Gee and 15.8% for Kate Hook.)	10.5%	7.7%	3.5%	9.1%	43.2%	—	56.8%
1 – 29 Apr 2025	YouGov (MRP)	10,822	—N/a	35.6%	35.3%	11.3%	10.2%	4.1%	3.5%	46.9%	—N/a	53.1%
17–24 Apr 2025	YouGov	—N/a	±6%	25.1%	38.9% (Note: Approximately 23% for Andrew Gee and 15% for Kate Hook.)	8.2%	13.9%	5.1%	8.8% (Note: 2.1% for Trumpet of Patriots and 6.7% for all others.)	43%	—N/a	57%
27 Feb – 26 Mar 2025	YouGov (MRP)	10,217	—N/a	42.2%	21%	16%	13.3%	6.7%	0.8%	56.2%	43.8%	—N/a
22 Jan – 12 Feb 2025	YouGov (MRP)	8,732	—N/a	46.2%	18.1%	15.1%	13.0%	6.8%	0.7%	59.7%	40.3%	—N/a
Between Mar–Dec 2024	Climate 200	—N/a	—N/a	33%	—N/a	—N/a	—N/a	—N/a	—N/a	—N/a	—N/a	—N/a
29 Oct – 20 Nov 2024	Accent/RedBridge (MRP)	4,909	—N/a	53%	—N/a	23%	—N/a	6%	18%	53%	47%	—N/a
10 Jul – 27 Aug 2024	Accent/RedBridge (MRP)	5,976	—N/a	47%	—N/a	20%	—N/a	4%	29%	56%	44%	—N/a
Feb – May 2024	Accent/RedBridge (MRP)	4,040	—N/a	46%	—N/a	18%	—N/a	8%	28%	57%	43%	—N/a
23 Dec 2022	Andrew Gee resigns from the National Party to sit as an independent											
21 May 2022	2022 federal election			47.7%	20.4%	15.1%	8.4%	4.6%	3.8%	59.7%	40.3%	—

=== Chifley ===
Date	Firm	Sample size	Margin of error	Primary vote						2PP vote	
Date	Firm	Sample size	Margin of error	ALP	LIB	ONP	GRN	IND	OTH	ALP	LIB
3 May 2025	2025 federal election			52.6%	19.7%	6.0%	9.8%	1.7%	10.2%	69.8%	30.2%
27 Feb – 26 Mar 2025	YouGov (MRP)	10,217	—N/a	41.3%	29.3%	9.8%	11.4%	4.9%	3.3%	58.2%	41.8%
22 Jan – 12 Feb 2025	YouGov (MRP)	8,732	—N/a	43.5%	27.8%	10.2%	9.9%	6.5%	2%	59.4%	40.6%
29 Oct – 20 Nov 2024	Accent/RedBridge (MRP)	4,909	—N/a	41%	34%	—N/a	9%	—N/a	16%	54%	46%
10 Jul – 27 Aug 2024	Accent/RedBridge (MRP)	5,976	—N/a	44%	30%	—N/a	13%	—N/a	13%	59%	41%
21 May 2022	2022 federal election			52.7%	24.7%	6.2%	5.8%	1.9%	8.7%	63.5%	36.5%

=== Cook ===
Date	Firm	Sample size	Margin of error	Primary vote						2PP vote		
Date	Firm	Sample size	Margin of error	LIB	ALP	GRN	ONP	IND	OTH	LIB	ALP	GRN
3 May 2025	2025 federal election			48.1%	31.5%	9.9%	4.4%	—	6.1%	57.2%	42.8%	—
27 Feb – 26 Mar 2025	YouGov (MRP)	10,217	—N/a	49.4%	25.1%	10.1%	8.2%	4.2%	2.9%	60.2%	39.8%	—N/a
22 Jan – 12 Feb 2025	YouGov (MRP)	8,732	—N/a	52.5%	23.9%	8.4%	8.2%	5.7%	1.4%	62.9%	37.1%	—N/a
29 Oct – 20 Nov 2024	Accent/RedBridge (MRP)	4,909	—N/a	55%	25%	6%	—N/a	—N/a	14%	63%	37%	—N/a
10 Jul – 27 Aug 2024	Accent/RedBridge (MRP)	5,976	—N/a	57%	25%	6%	—N/a	—N/a	12%	64%	36%	—N/a
13 Apr 2024	2024 by-election			62.7%	—	16.5%	—	5.7%	15.2%	71.3%	—	28.8%
28 Mar 2024	uComms (Note: Sponsored by the Australia Institute)	914	±3.6%	45.4%	—N/a	12.4%	—N/a	6.1%	11.7%	65%	—N/a	35%
21 May 2022	2022 federal election			55.3%	25%	9.9%	5.1%	—	4.5%	62.4%	37.6%	—

=== Cowper ===
Date	Firm	Sample size	Margin of error	Primary vote						2CP vote	
Date	Firm	Sample size	Margin of error	NAT	IND	ALP	ONP	GRN	OTH	NAT	IND
3 May 2025	2025 federal election			37.9%	29.4%	11.8%	6.4%	4.2%	10.3%	52.5%	47.5%
27 Feb – 26 Mar 2025	YouGov (MRP)	10,217	—N/a	35.6%	29.8%	15.3%	11.1%	7.5%	0.7%	48.4%	51.6%
Late Feb 2025	Climate 200	980	±3%	35%	—N/a	—N/a	—N/a	—N/a	—N/a	47%	53%
Between Mar–Dec 2024	Climate 200	—N/a	—N/a	42%	—N/a	—N/a	—N/a	—N/a	—N/a	—N/a	—N/a
22 Jan – 12 Feb 2025	YouGov (MRP)	8,732	—N/a	37.1%	25.1%	16.8%	12.8%	7.2%	1.1%	50.9%	49.1%
29 Oct – 20 Nov 2024	Accent/RedBridge (MRP)	4,909	—N/a	42%	—N/a	26%	—N/a	5%	26%	52%	48%
10 Jul – 27 Aug 2024	Accent/RedBridge (MRP)	5,976	—N/a	38%	—N/a	23%	—N/a	11%	28%	47%	53%
Feb – May 2024	Accent/RedBridge (MRP)	4,040	—N/a	37%	—N/a	18%	—N/a	9%	36%	48%	52%
21 May 2022	2022 federal election			39.5%	26.3%	14%	8.1%	5.9%	6.3%	52.3%	47.7%

=== Cunningham ===
Date	Firm	Sample size	Margin of error	Primary vote						2PP vote	
Date	Firm	Sample size	Margin of error	ALP	LIB	GRN	ONP	IND	OTH	ALP	LIB
3 May 2025	2025 federal election			44.7%	23.2%	20.4%	7.6%	—	4.1%	67.5%	32.5%
27 Feb – 26 Mar 2025	YouGov (MRP)	10,217	—N/a	37.2%	27.3%	19.7%	7.3%	5.1%	3.3%	60%	40%
22 Jan – 12 Feb 2025	YouGov (MRP)	8,732	—N/a	37.5%	29.4%	17.8%	7.6%	5.8%	1.8%	58.4%	41.6%
29 Oct – 20 Nov 2024	Accent/RedBridge (MRP)	4,909	—N/a	44%	28%	16%	—N/a	—N/a	12%	63%	37%
10 Jul – 27 Aug 2024	Accent/RedBridge (MRP)	5,976	—N/a	40%	29%	16%	—N/a	—N/a	14%	60%	40%
21 May 2022	2022 federal election			40.1%	25%	21.7%	5.1%	—	8.1%	64.7%	35.3%

=== Dobell ===
Date	Firm	Sample size	Margin of error	Primary vote						2PP vote	
Date	Firm	Sample size	Margin of error	ALP	LIB	GRN	ONP	IND	OTH	ALP	LIB
3 May 2025	2025 federal election			42.8%	27.8%	10.3%	8.7%	—	10.4%	59.4%	40.6%
27 Feb – 26 Mar 2025	YouGov (MRP)	10,217	—N/a	35.6%	34.7%	10.9%	11.8%	4.5%	2.7%	52.1%	47.9%
22 Jan – 12 Feb 2025	YouGov (MRP)	8,732	—N/a	34.6%	34.7%	9%	13.4%	6.4%	2%	50.7%	49.3%
29 Oct – 20 Nov 2024	Accent/RedBridge (MRP)	4,909	—N/a	40%	38%	7%	—N/a	—N/a	14%	51%	49%
10 Jul – 27 Aug 2024	Accent/RedBridge (MRP)	5,976	—N/a	38%	34%	13%	—N/a	—N/a	15%	51%	49%
21 May 2022	2022 federal election			42.9%	33.7%	8.6%	7.5%	—	7.4%	56.5%	43.5%

=== Eden-Monaro ===
Date	Firm	Sample size	Margin of error	Primary vote						2PP vote	
Date	Firm	Sample size	Margin of error	ALP	LIB	GRN	ONP	IND	OTH	ALP	LIB
3 May 2025	2025 federal election			43.0%	31.9%	10.0%	7.0%	3.9%	4.2%	57.2%	42.8%
17 – 24 Apr 2025	YouGov	268	±6%	42.2%	26.0%	10.9%	7.0%	10.6%	3.3% (Note: 2.8% for Trumpet of Patriots and 0.5% for all others.)	61%	39%
27 Feb – 26 Mar 2025	YouGov (MRP)	10,217	—N/a	32.6%	35.8%	10.8%	9%	7%	4.6%	50.7%	49.3%
22 Jan – 12 Feb 2025	YouGov (MRP)	8,732	—N/a	30.4%	37%	9.8%	10.6%	8.9%	3.3%	48.4%	51.6%
18–20 Dec 2024	Pyxis (Note: Commissioned by the Australian Climate and Biodiversity Foundation.)	400	±4.9%	—N/a	—N/a	—N/a	—N/a	—N/a	—N/a	—N/a	—N/a
29 Oct – 20 Nov 2024	Accent/RedBridge (MRP)	4,909	—N/a	39%	37%	7%	—N/a	—N/a	17%	54%	46%
10 Jul – 27 Aug 2024	Accent/RedBridge (MRP)	5,976	—N/a	36%	38%	7%	—N/a	—N/a	19%	53%	47%
21 May 2022	2022 federal election			42.6%	33.0%	9.2%	4.3%	2.0%	8.9%	58.2%	41.8%

=== Farrer ===
Date	Firm	Sample size	Margin of error	Primary vote						2CP vote		
Date	Firm	Sample size	Margin of error	LIB	ALP	GRN	ONP	IND	OTH	LIB	ALP	IND
3 May 2025	2025 federal election			43.4%	15.1%	4.9%	6.6%	20.0%	10.0%	56.2%	—	43.2%
27 Feb – 26 Mar 2025	YouGov (MRP)	10,217	—N/a	48.5%	18.9%	9.5%	13.1%	7.2%	2.8%	63.6%	36.4%	—N/a
22 Jan – 12 Feb 2025	YouGov (MRP)	8,732	—N/a	49.5%	19.5%	9%	10.5%	9.2%	2.2%	63.5%	36.5%	—N/a
29 Oct – 20 Nov 2024	Accent/RedBridge (MRP)	4,909	—N/a	47%	17%	9%	—N/a	—N/a	27%	65%	35%	—N/a
10 Jul – 27 Aug 2024	Accent/RedBridge (MRP)	5,976	—N/a	51%	19%	7%	—N/a	—N/a	23%	66%	34%	—N/a
21 May 2022	2022 federal election			52.3%	19%	9.1%	6.3%	3.2%	10.2%	66.4%	33.7%	—

=== Fowler ===
Date	Firm	Sample size	Margin of error	Primary vote						2CP vote		
Date	Firm	Sample size	Margin of error	ALP	IND	LIB	GRN	ONP	OTH	IND	ALP	LIB
3 May 2025	2025 federal election			37.5%	33.5%	12.3%	6.8%	4.1%	5.8%	52.7%	47.3%	—
1 – 29 Apr 2025	YouGov (MRP)	10,822	—N/a	27.2%	44.8%	13.8%	7.3%	5.6%	1.4%	63%	37%	—N/a
3 Feb – 1 Apr 2025	Accent/RedBridge (MRP)	9,953	—N/a	27%	—N/a	21%	9%	—N/a	44%	57%	43%	—N/a
27 Feb – 26 Mar 2025	YouGov (MRP)	10,217	—N/a	31.6%	26.9%	23.1%	9.7%	7.3%	1.5%	52.7%	47.3%	—N/a
22 Jan – 12 Feb 2025	YouGov (MRP)	8,732	—N/a	32.1%	22%	26.9%	11.9%	5.4%	1.6%	—N/a	55.8%	44.2%
29 Oct – 20 Nov 2024	Accent/RedBridge (MRP)	4,909	—N/a	22%	—N/a	23%	7%	—N/a	47%	66%	34%	—N/a
10 Jul – 27 Aug 2024	Accent/RedBridge (MRP)	5,976	—N/a	26%	—N/a	27%	7%	—N/a	40%	61%	—N/a	39%
21 May 2022	2022 federal election			36.1%	29.5%	17.2%	4.9%	3.6%	8.9%	51.6%	48.4%	—

=== Gilmore ===
Date	Firm	Sample size	Margin of error	Primary vote						2PP vote	
Date	Firm	Sample size	Margin of error	LIB	ALP	GRN	IND	ONP	OTH	ALP	LIB
3 May 2025	2025 federal election			34.5%	38.1%	7.2%	7.5%	5.0%	7.7%	55.1%	44.9%
17–24 Apr 2025	YouGov	—N/a	±6%	33.5%	36.2%	11.1%	8.5%	6.0%	4.7% (Note: 0.2% for Trumpet of Patriots and 4.5% for all others.)	—N/a	—N/a
27 Feb – 26 Mar 2025	YouGov (MRP)	10,217	—N/a	38.8%	31.7%	10.6%	9.8%	8%	1.1%	49.1%	50.9%
17–20 Feb 2025	uComms (Note: Commissioned by the Australian Forest Products Association)	684	—N/a	—N/a	—N/a	—N/a	—N/a	—N/a	—N/a	47.2%	52.8%
22 Jan – 12 Feb 2025	YouGov (MRP)	8,732	—N/a	39.6%	29.3%	9.5%	12.1%	8.3%	1.3%	47.2%	52.8%
29 Oct – 20 Nov 2024	Accent/RedBridge (MRP)	4,909	—N/a	45%	32%	6%	—N/a	—N/a	17%	45%	55%
10 Jul – 27 Aug 2024	Accent/RedBridge (MRP)	5,976	—N/a	44%	29%	9%	—N/a	—N/a	18%	44%	56%
21 May 2022	2022 federal election			42%	36%	10.2%	4.2%	4%	3.6%	50.2%	49.8%

=== Grayndler ===
Date	Firm	Sample size	Margin of error	Primary vote						2CP vote	
Date	Firm	Sample size	Margin of error	ALP	GRN	LIB	IND	ONP	OTH	ALP	GRN
3 May 2025	2025 federal election			53.5%	25.1%	14.3%	2.3%	3.2%	1.6%	66.9%	33.1%
27 Feb – 26 Mar 2025	YouGov (MRP)	10,217	—N/a	44.5%	23.4%	19.1%	6.5%	3.9%	2.6%	63%	37%
22 Jan – 12 Feb 2025	YouGov (MRP)	8,732	—N/a	46.9%	21.7%	19.4%	5.8%	4.7%	1.5%	63.8%	36.2%
29 Oct – 20 Nov 2024	Accent/RedBridge (MRP)	4,909	—N/a	48%	21%	25%	—N/a	—N/a	6%	66%	34%
10 Jul – 27 Aug 2024	Accent/RedBridge (MRP)	5,976	—N/a	46%	26%	20%	—N/a	—N/a	7%	63%	37%
21 May 2022	2022 federal election			53.6%	22%	16%	2.1%	1.5%	4.7%	67.1%	33%

=== Greenway ===
Date	Firm	Sample size	Margin of error	Primary vote						2PP vote	
Date	Firm	Sample size	Margin of error	ALP	LIB	GRN	ONP	IND	OTH	ALP	LIB
3 May 2025	2025 federal election			50.4%	27.5%	10.7%	4.6%	2.6%	4.2%	63.8%	36.2%
27 Feb – 26 Mar 2025	YouGov (MRP)	10,217	—N/a	37.6%	39.6%	7%	6.2%	6.6%	3%	49.8%	50.2%
22 Jan – 12 Feb 2025	YouGov (MRP)	8,732	—N/a	34.9%	37%	10.6%	7.4%	8.3%	1.9%	51.4%	48.6%
29 Oct – 20 Nov 2024	Accent/RedBridge (MRP)	4,909	—N/a	40%	41%	8%	—N/a	—N/a	11%	52%	48%
10 Jul – 27 Aug 2024	Accent/RedBridge (MRP)	5,976	—N/a	42%	37%	8%	—N/a	—N/a	13%	55%	45%
21 May 2022	2022 federal election			48.3%	29.8%	7.1%	2.7%	1.6%	10.6%	61.5%	38.5%

=== Hughes ===
Date	Firm	Sample size	Margin of error	Primary vote						2PP vote	
Date	Firm	Sample size	Margin of error	LIB	ALP	IND	GRN	ONP	OTH	LIB	ALP
3 May 2025	2025 federal election			36.5%	39.0%	—	11.4%	5.3%	7.8%	46.9%	53.1%
27 Feb – 26 Mar 2025	YouGov (MRP)	10,217	—N/a	39.5%	24.4%	17.2%	10.4%	5.8%	2.7%	53.9%	46.1%
22 Jan – 12 Feb 2025	YouGov (MRP)	8,732	—N/a	42.3%	24.5%	15.4%	8.9%	7.4%	1.4%	56.3%	43.7%
29 Oct – 20 Nov 2024	Accent/RedBridge (MRP)	4,909	—N/a	44%	31%	—N/a	10%	—N/a	16%	53%	47%
10 Jul – 27 Aug 2024	Accent/RedBridge (MRP)	5,976	—N/a	44%	35%	—N/a	8%	—N/a	13%	51%	49%
21 May 2022	2022 federal election			43.5%	22.5%	17.5%	6.3%	2.7%	7.4%	57%	43%

=== Hume ===
Date	Firm	Sample size	Margin of error	Primary vote						2PP vote	
Date	Firm	Sample size	Margin of error	LIB	ALP	IND	ONP	GRN	OTH	LIB	ALP
3 May 2025	2025 federal election			43.9%	27.2%	4.5%	8.0%	8.5%	7.9%	58.1%	41.9%
27 Feb – 26 Mar 2025	YouGov (MRP)	10,217	—N/a	42.8%	22.3%	11.8%	7.7%	12.8%	2.7%	59.1%	40.9%
22 Jan – 12 Feb 2025	YouGov (MRP)	8,732	—N/a	46.7%	20.2%	11.8%	11.6%	8.2%	1.6%	61.9%	38.1%
29 Oct – 20 Nov 2024	Accent/RedBridge (MRP)	4,909	—N/a	48%	24%	—N/a	—N/a	5%	23%	60%	40%
10 Jul – 27 Aug 2024	Accent/RedBridge (MRP)	5,976	—N/a	44%	27%	—N/a	—N/a	6%	23%	56%	44%
21 May 2022	2022 federal election			43.1%	19.9%	16.4%	7.4%	5%	8.3%	57.7%	42.3%

=== Hunter ===
Date	Firm	Sample size	Margin of error	Primary vote						2CP vote		
Date	Firm	Sample size	Margin of error	ALP	NAT	ONP	GRN	IND	OTH	ALP	ONP	NAT
3 May 2025	2025 federal election			43.5%	18.2%	16.1%	7.4%	—	14.8%	59.0%	41.0%	—
24 Apr 2025	KJC Research	600	—N/a	—N/a	—N/a	—N/a	—N/a	—N/a	—N/a	45%	—N/a	41%
17 – 24 Apr 2025	YouGov	—N/a	±6%	35.8%	14.5%	25.3%	8.8%	0.5%	15.0% (Note: 0.5% for Trumpet of Patriots and 14.5% for all others.)	—N/a	—N/a	—N/a
27 Feb – 26 Mar 2025	YouGov (MRP)	10,217	—N/a	33.2%	30.8%	16.2%	10.2%	7.3%	2.2%	52.2%	—N/a	47.8%
22 Jan – 12 Feb 2025	YouGov (MRP)	8,732	—N/a	30.6%	33.5%	15.3%	8.7%	9.7%	2.2%	49.1%	—N/a	50.9%
29 Oct – 20 Nov 2024	Accent/RedBridge (MRP)	4,909	—N/a	31%	30%	—N/a	9%	—N/a	30%	49%	—N/a	51%
10 Jul – 27 Aug 2024	Accent/RedBridge (MRP)	5,976	—N/a	36%	31%	—N/a	8%	—N/a	25%	51%	—N/a	49%
21 May 2022	2022 federal election			38.5%	27.4%	10%	8.9%	7.5%	7.7%	54%	—	46%

=== Kingsford Smith ===
Date	Firm	Sample size	Margin of error	Primary vote						2PP vote	
Date	Firm	Sample size	Margin of error	ALP	LIB	GRN	ONP	IND	OTH	ALP	LIB
3 May 2025	2025 federal election			50.8%	26.1%	13.6%	5.9%	3.6%	—	67.2%	32.8%
27 Feb – 26 Mar 2025	YouGov (MRP)	10,217	—N/a	41.5%	29.9%	16%	5.4%	5.1%	2%	60.1%	39.9%
22 Jan – 12 Feb 2025	YouGov (MRP)	8,732	—N/a	39.8%	31.8%	15.6%	5.4%	5.9%	1.4%	58.1%	41.9%
29 Oct – 20 Nov 2024	Accent/RedBridge (MRP)	4,909	—N/a	40%	35%	16%	—N/a	—N/a	9%	57%	43%
10 Jul – 27 Aug 2024	Accent/RedBridge (MRP)	5,976	—N/a	41%	33%	17%	—N/a	—N/a	10%	58%	42%
21 May 2022	2022 federal election			47.9%	28.7%	16.8%	3.1%	—	3.5%	64.5%	35.5%

=== Lindsay ===
Date	Firm	Sample size	Margin of error	Primary vote						2PP vote	
Date	Firm	Sample size	Margin of error	LIB	ALP	GRN	ONP	IND	OTH	LIB	ALP
3 May 2025	2025 federal election			39.7%	31.1%	9.6%	6.9%	1.1%	10.6%	52.8%	47.2%
27 Feb – 26 Mar 2025	YouGov (MRP)	10,217	—N/a	43.2%	28.8%	10.3%	9.6%	4.8%	3.2%	55.4%	44.6%
22 Jan – 12 Feb 2025	YouGov (MRP)	8,732	—N/a	43.3%	28.5%	9.5%	11.9%	5.1%	1.7%	56.4%	43.6%
29 Oct – 20 Nov 2024	Accent/RedBridge (MRP)	4,909	—N/a	48%	29%	7%	—N/a	—N/a	16%	59%	41%
10 Jul – 27 Aug 2024	Accent/RedBridge (MRP)	5,976	—N/a	48%	28%	9%	—N/a	—N/a	15%	58%	42%
21 May 2022	2022 federal election			46.7%	31.7%	8%	5.9%	—	7.6%	56.3%	43.7%

=== Lyne ===
Date	Firm	Sample size	Margin of error	Primary vote						2PP vote	
Date	Firm	Sample size	Margin of error	NAT	ALP	ONP	GRN	IND	OTH	NAT	ALP
3 May 2025	2025 federal election			36.2%	19.8%	8.4%	6.4%	15.5%	13.7%	59.8%	40.2%
27 Feb – 26 Mar 2025	YouGov (MRP)	10,217	—N/a	41.1%	20.9%	14%	8.3%	12.9%	2.8%	58.9%	41.1%
Late Feb 2025	Climate 200	867	±3%	39%	—N/a	—N/a	—N/a	—N/a	—N/a	—N/a	—N/a
22 Jan – 12 Feb 2025	YouGov (MRP)	8,732	—N/a	44.7%	20.2%	12%	7.9%	12.5%	2.7%	61%	39%
29 Oct – 20 Nov 2024	Accent/RedBridge (MRP)	4,909	—N/a	40%	22%	—N/a	8%	—N/a	30%	62%	38%
10 Jul – 27 Aug 2024	Accent/RedBridge (MRP)	5,976	—N/a	39%	20%	—N/a	11%	—N/a	30%	62%	38%
21 May 2022	2022 federal election			43.5%	21.5%	7.9%	7.9%	10.5%	8.8%	63.8%	36.2%

=== Macarthur ===
Date	Firm	Sample size	Margin of error	Primary vote						2PP vote	
Date	Firm	Sample size	Margin of error	ALP	LIB	ONP	GRN	IND	OTH	ALP	LIB
3 May 2025	2025 federal election			48.2%	23.1%	7.8%	12.8%	—	8.1%	65.6%	34.4%
27 Feb – 26 Mar 2025	YouGov (MRP)	10,217	—N/a	35%	33.4%	12.2%	11.6%	4.8%	3%	52.6%	47.4%
22 Jan – 12 Feb 2025	YouGov (MRP)	8,732	—N/a	37.6%	33.1%	12.8%	9.9%	4.9%	1.7%	53.2%	46.8%
29 Oct – 20 Nov 2024	Accent/RedBridge (MRP)	4,909	—N/a	32%	41%	—N/a	12%	—N/a	15%	48%	52%
10 Jul – 27 Aug 2024	Accent/RedBridge (MRP)	5,976	—N/a	38%	35%	—N/a	15%	—N/a	12%	54%	46%
21 May 2022	2022 federal election			45.9%	30.5%	8%	7.7%	—	7.9%	58.5%	41.5%

=== Mackellar ===
Date	Firm	Sample size	Margin of error	Primary vote						2CP vote	
Date	Firm	Sample size	Margin of error	LIB	IND	ALP	GRN	ONP	OTH	IND	LIB
3 May 2025	2025 federal election			35.5%	38.0%	12.1%	6.1%	2.5%	5.8%	55.7%	44.3%
5–7 Mar 2025	Freshwater Strategy (Note: The polling figures published by The Daily Telegraph include the two-candidate-preferred vote winner and the average primary vote results across the electorates of Curtin, Goldstein, Kooyong, Mackellar, Warringah and Wentworth.)	830	—N/a	41%	33%	7%	7%	—N/a	12%	Loss	Win
27 Feb – 26 Mar 2025	YouGov (MRP)	10,217	—N/a	39.7%	34%	14.2%	8.1%	3.5%	0.5%	51.6%	48.4%
22 Jan – 12 Feb 2025	YouGov (MRP)	8,732	—N/a	37.7%	34.5%	13.6%	8.9%	4.8%	0.4%	53.8%	46.2%
29 Oct – 20 Nov 2024	Accent/RedBridge (MRP)	4,909	—N/a	43%	—N/a	13%	3%	—N/a	40%	49%	51%
10 Jul – 27 Aug 2024	Accent/RedBridge (MRP)	5,976	—N/a	43%	—N/a	11%	7%	—N/a	39%	53%	47%
5 Feb 2024	uComms (Note: Commissioned by The Australia Institute.)	602	±3.85%	35.3%	30.4%	13.2%	5.8%	—N/a	4.5%	54%	46%
21 May 2022	2022 federal election			41.4%	38.1%	8.3%	6.1%	2.7%	3.5%	52.5%	47.5%

=== Macquarie ===
Date	Firm	Sample size	Margin of error	Primary vote						2PP vote	
Date	Firm	Sample size	Margin of error	ALP	LIB	GRN	ONP	IND	OTH	ALP	LIB
3 May 2025	2025 federal election			42.6%	31.6%	12.5%	8.7%	—	4.6%	57.7%	42.3%
27 Feb – 26 Mar 2025	YouGov (MRP)	10,217	—N/a	32.7%	36.5%	12.7%	10.1%	5.7%	2.6%	50.6%	49.4%
22 Jan – 12 Feb 2025	YouGov (MRP)	8,732	—N/a	34.3%	37.2%	9.5%	10.9%	6.3%	1.8%	49.9%	50.1%
29 Oct – 20 Nov 2024	Accent/RedBridge (MRP)	4,909	—N/a	35%	39%	8%	—N/a	—N/a	18%	51%	49%
10 Jul – 27 Aug 2024	Accent/RedBridge (MRP)	5,976	—N/a	30%	37%	19%	—N/a	—N/a	13%	54%	46%
21 May 2022	2022 federal election			43%	34.6%	9.6%	5.2%	—	7.7%	57.8%	42.2%

=== McMahon ===
Date	Firm	Sample size	Margin of error	Primary vote						2PP vote	
Date	Firm	Sample size	Margin of error	ALP	LIB	GRN	ONP	IND	OTH	ALP	LIB
3 May 2025	2025 federal election			45.5%	26.8%	9.1%	8.8%	9.8%	—	59.0%	41.0%
1–29 Apr 2025	YouGov (MRP)	10,822	—N/a	45.5%	27.5%	11.2%	12.0%	3.9%	—N/a	60.8%	39.2%
8 Apr 2025	Compass Polling	1,003	±2.5%	19%	20%	—N/a	—N/a	41%	—N/a	—N/a	—N/a
3 Feb – 1 Apr 2025	Accent/RedBridge (MRP)	9,953	—N/a	40%	31%	10%	—N/a	—N/a	19%	56%	44%
27 Feb – 26 Mar 2025	YouGov (MRP)	10,217	—N/a	37.8%	33.6%	9.6%	8.3%	5.2%	5.5%	54%	46%
22 Jan – 12 Feb 2025	YouGov (MRP)	8,732	—N/a	37.7%	34.1%	9.4%	8.6%	6.6%	3.6%	53.5%	46.5%
29 Oct – 20 Nov 2024	Accent/RedBridge (MRP)	4,909	—N/a	41%	36%	11%	—N/a	—N/a	12%	55%	45%
10 Jul – 27 Aug 2024	Accent/RedBridge (MRP)	5,976	—N/a	45%	35%	8%	—N/a	—N/a	12%	56%	44%
Feb – May 2024	Accent/RedBridge (MRP)	4,040	—N/a	44%	32%	8%	—N/a	—N/a	17%	60%	40%
21 May 2022	2022 federal election			48%	28.3%	5.8%	5.4%	—	12.4%	59.5%	40.5%

=== Mitchell ===
Date	Firm	Sample size	Margin of error	Primary vote						2PP vote	
Date	Firm	Sample size	Margin of error	LIB	ALP	GRN	ONP	IND	OTH	LIB	ALP
3 May 2025	2025 federal election			46.3%	33.2%	13.7%	4.3%	—	2.5%	53.8%	46.2%
27 Feb – 26 Mar 2025	YouGov (MRP)	10,217	—N/a	50.1%	23.9%	12.8%	5.3%	3.6%	4.3%	60%	40%
22 Jan – 12 Feb 2025	YouGov (MRP)	8,732	—N/a	53.3%	23.5%	10.8%	4.9%	5.9%	1.6%	62.1%	37.9%
29 Oct – 20 Nov 2024	Accent/RedBridge (MRP)	4,909	—N/a	56%	25%	10%	—N/a	—N/a	9%	63%	37%
10 Jul – 27 Aug 2024	Accent/RedBridge (MRP)	5,976	—N/a	55%	25%	10%	—N/a	—N/a	10%	63%	37%
21 May 2022	2022 federal election			52.6%	25.5%	11.8%	3%	—	7.1%	60.7%	39.3%

=== New England ===
Date	Firm	Sample size	Margin of error	Primary vote						2PP vote	
Date	Firm	Sample size	Margin of error	NAT	ALP	IND	GRN	ONP	OTH	NAT	ALP
3 May 2025	2025 federal election			52.2%	20.3%	3.7%	7.9%	10.0%	5.9%	67.1%	32.9%
1–29 Apr 2025	YouGov (MRP)	10,822	—N/a	43.8%	18.2%	9.6%	9.8%	12.7%	5.9%	61.2%	38.8%
9–23 Apr 2025	New England Times	426	±4%	43.6%	24.1%	2.4%	12.2%	6.8%	3.8% (Note: 2.1% for Trumpet of Patriots and 1.7% for Family First.)	57.3%	42.7%
27 Feb – 26 Mar 2025	YouGov (MRP)	10,217	—N/a	46%	19.7%	11%	8.5%	13.1%	1.7%	61.9%	38.1%
22 Jan – 12 Feb 2025	YouGov (MRP)	8,732	—N/a	46.9%	18.4%	13.9%	9%	10.3%	1.4%	62.2%	37.8%
29 Oct – 20 Nov 2024	Accent/RedBridge (MRP)	4,909	—N/a	46%	19%	—N/a	8%	—N/a	27%	64%	36%
10 Jul – 27 Aug 2024	Accent/RedBridge (MRP)	5,976	—N/a	41%	17%	—N/a	5%	—N/a	37%	64%	35%
21 May 2022	2022 federal election			52.5%	18.6%	10.7%	7.7%	4.7%	5.9%	66.4%	33.6%

=== Newcastle ===
Date	Firm	Sample size	Margin of error	Primary vote						2CP vote		
Date	Firm	Sample size	Margin of error	ALP	LIB	GRN	ONP	IND	OTH	ALP	LIB	GRN
3 May 2025	2025 federal election			45.3%	19.1%	22.2%	5.4%	0.8%	7.2%	65.8%	—	34.2%
27 Feb – 26 Mar 2025	YouGov (MRP)	10,217	—N/a	38.2%	25.8%	19.8%	8.1%	5.3%	2.9%	61.2%	38.8%	—N/a
22 Jan – 12 Feb 2025	YouGov (MRP)	8,732	—N/a	41.1%	26.7%	17.1%	8.4%	5.1%	1.6%	61.1%	38.9%	—N/a
29 Oct – 20 Nov 2024	Accent/RedBridge (MRP)	4,909	—N/a	43%	26%	19%	—N/a	—N/a	11%	63%	37%	—N/a
10 Jul – 27 Aug 2024	Accent/RedBridge (MRP)	5,976	—N/a	41%	28%	15%	—N/a	—N/a	15%	63%	37%	—N/a
21 May 2022	2022 federal election			44.1%	24.4%	20.1%	4.5%	—	6.9%	68%	32%	—

=== Page ===
Date	Firm	Sample size	Margin of error	Primary vote						2PP vote	
Date	Firm	Sample size	Margin of error	NAT	ALP	IND	GRN	ONP	OTH	NAT	ALP
3 May 2025	2025 federal election			44.7%	22.0%	1.3%	15.1%	5.7%	11.2%	59.3%	40.7%
27 Feb – 26 Mar 2025	YouGov (MRP)	10,217	—N/a	41.9%	20.7%	14.5%	9.7%	10.7%	2.5%	58.2%	41.8%
22 Jan – 12 Feb 2025	YouGov (MRP)	8,732	—N/a	43.1%	18.1%	16.2%	10.2%	10.1%	2.4%	59.4%	40.6%
29 Oct – 20 Nov 2024	Accent/RedBridge (MRP)	4,909	—N/a	44%	22%	—N/a	10%	—N/a	24%	58%	42%
10 Jul – 27 Aug 2024	Accent/RedBridge (MRP)	5,976	—N/a	42%	21%	—N/a	9%	—N/a	28%	58%	42%
21 May 2022	2022 federal election			45.6%	18.7%	13.1%	8.5%	5.4%	8.7%	60.7%	39.3%

=== Parkes ===
Date	Firm	Sample size	Margin of error	Primary vote						2PP vote	
Date	Firm	Sample size	Margin of error	NAT	ALP	ONP	GRN	IND	OTH	NAT	ALP
3 May 2025	2025 federal election			39.9%	19.7%	13.6%	6.1%	2.5%	18.2%	63.0%	37.0%
27 Feb – 26 Mar 2025	YouGov (MRP)	10,217	—N/a	46.5%	18.5%	16.2%	7%	6.4%	5.3%	64.3%	35.7%
22 Jan – 12 Feb 2025	YouGov (MRP)	8,732	—N/a	47.5%	19.4%	15.3%	7.1%	7.3%	3.5%	64.3%	35.7%
29 Oct – 20 Nov 2024	Accent/RedBridge (MRP)	4,909	—N/a	43%	19%	—N/a	5%	—N/a	33%	67%	33%
10 Jul – 27 Aug 2024	Accent/RedBridge (MRP)	5,976	—N/a	43%	18%	—N/a	5%	—N/a	33%	67%	33%
21 May 2022	2022 federal election			49.3%	20.2%	7.5%	4.7%	2.5%	15.8%	67.8%	32.2%

=== Parramatta ===
Date	Firm	Sample size	Margin of error	Primary vote						2PP vote	
Date	Firm	Sample size	Margin of error	ALP	LIB	GRN	ONP	IND	OTH	ALP	LIB
3 May 2025	2025 federal election			47.8%	30.7%	12.1%	2.7%	2.6%	4.1%	62.5%	37.5%
27 Feb – 26 Mar 2025	YouGov (MRP)	10,217	—N/a	35.8	37.3%	12.6%	5.1%	5.8%	3.5%	52.6%	47.4%
22 Jan – 12 Feb 2025	YouGov (MRP)	8,732	—N/a	34%	38.1%	12.5%	5.2%	8.1%	2.1%	51.3%	48.7%
29 Oct – 20 Nov 2024	Accent/RedBridge (MRP)	4,909	—N/a	40%	36%	14%	—N/a	—N/a	10%	52%	48%
10 Jul – 27 Aug 2024	Accent/RedBridge (MRP)	5,976	—N/a	40%	40%	9%	—N/a	—N/a	11%	52%	48%
21 May 2022	2022 federal election			40.7%	35%	9%	2.4%	—	13%	54.6%	45.4%

=== Paterson ===
Date	Firm	Sample size	Margin of error	Primary vote						2PP vote	
Date	Firm	Sample size	Margin of error	ALP	LIB	ONP	GRN	IND	OTH	ALP	LIB
3 May 2025	2025 federal election			37.1%	27.2%	7.6%	7.6%	12.1%	7.4%	56.9%	43.1%
17–24 Apr 2025	YouGov	—N/a	±6%	30.9%	25.9%	14.2%	11.5%	15.9%	1.6% (Note: 0.4% for Trumpet of Patriots and 1.2% for all others.)	—N/a	—N/a
27 Feb – 26 Mar 2025	YouGov (MRP)	10,217	—N/a	36%	37.2%	11.8%	9.3%	3.9%	1.9%	50.6%	49.4%
22 Jan – 12 Feb 2025	YouGov (MRP)	8,732	—N/a	31.3%	38.9%	14.1%	7.4%	6.8%	2.5%	46.4%	53.6%
29 Oct – 20 Nov 2024	Accent/RedBridge (MRP)	4,909	—N/a	34%	45%	—N/a	14%	—N/a	7%	46%	54%
10 Jul – 27 Aug 2024	Accent/RedBridge (MRP)	5,976	—N/a	32%	42%	—N/a	9%	—N/a	17%	46%	54%
21 May 2022	2022 federal election			40.7%	36.7%	8.2%	7.6%	—	6.9%	53.3%	46.7%

=== Reid ===
Date	Firm	Sample size	Margin of error	Primary vote						2PP vote	
Date	Firm	Sample size	Margin of error	ALP	LIB	GRN	IND	ONP	OTH	ALP	LIB
3 May 2025	2025 federal election			48.6%	31.7%	11.5%	3.1%	2.3%	2.8%	62.0%	38.0%
27 Feb – 26 Mar 2025	YouGov (MRP)	10,217	—N/a	34.3%	38.5%	12.9%	5.8%	5.7%	2.7%	51.3%	48.7%
22 Jan – 12 Feb 2025	YouGov (MRP)	8,732	—N/a	34.8%	38.3%	11.8%	8%	5.1%	1.8%	51.5%	48.5%
29 Oct – 20 Nov 2024	Accent/RedBridge (MRP)	4,909	—N/a	40%	44%	7%	—N/a	—N/a	9%	50%	50%
10 Jul – 27 Aug 2024	Accent/RedBridge (MRP)	5,976	—N/a	38%	39%	16%	—N/a	—N/a	7%	55%	45%
21 May 2022	2022 federal election			41.6%	37.9%	9.4%	3.1%	2%	6%	55.2%	44.8%

=== Richmond ===
Date	Firm	Sample size	Margin of error	Primary vote						2PP vote		
Date	Firm	Sample size	Margin of error	ALP	GRN	NAT	IND	ONP	OTH	ALP	NAT	GRN
3 May 2025	2025 federal election			30.4%	26.5%	24.6%	2.6%	5.4%	7.3%	60.0%	40.0%	—
24 Apr 2025	KJC Research	600	—N/a	—N/a	—N/a	—N/a	—N/a	—N/a	—N/a	34%	—N/a	39%
27 Feb – 26 Mar 2025	YouGov (MRP)	10,217	—N/a	26.1%	19.4%	28.4%	9.4%	10.4%	6.3%	53.7%	46.3%	—N/a
22 Jan – 12 Feb 2025	YouGov (MRP)	8,732	—N/a	25.4%	22.7%	31.3%	9.2%	5.6%	5.7%	53.4%	46.6%	—N/a
9–12 Dec 2024	Pyxis	400	±4.5%	—N/a	—N/a	—N/a	—N/a	—N/a	—N/a	—N/a	—N/a	—N/a
29 Oct – 20 Nov 2024	Accent/RedBridge (MRP)	4,909	—N/a	36%	21%	27%	—N/a	—N/a	17%	60%	40%	—N/a
10 Jul – 27 Aug 2024	Accent/RedBridge (MRP)	5,976	—N/a	31%	18%	22%	—N/a	—N/a	29%	56%	44%	—N/a
21 May 2022	2022 federal election			28.8%	25.3%	23.4%	5.6%	4.1%	12.9%	58.2%	41.8%	—

=== Riverina ===
Date	Firm	Sample size	Margin of error	Primary vote						2PP vote	
Date	Firm	Sample size	Margin of error	NAT	ALP	ONP	GRN	IND	OTH	NAT	ALP
3 May 2025	2025 federal election			40.3%	18.4%	9.9%	4.5%	16.6%	10.3%	62.6%	37.4%
27 Feb – 26 Mar 2025	YouGo (MRP)	10,217	—N/a	42.6%	20.9%	16.8%	8.6%	6.2%	4.9%	60.8%	39.2%
22 Jan – 12 Feb 2025	YouGov (MRP)	8,732	—N/a	44.6%	21.6%	13.4%	8.5%	7.2%	4.7%	60.8%	39.2%
29 Oct – 20 Nov 2024	Accent/RedBridge (MRP)	4,909	—N/a	40%	23%	—N/a	10%	—N/a	26%	58%	42%
10 Jul – 27 Aug 2024	Accent/RedBridge (MRP)	5,976	—N/a	45%	26%	—N/a	7%	—N/a	22%	59%	41%
21 May 2022	2022 federal election			46.6%	20.5%	8.2%	6.4%	—	15.6%	64.9%	35.2%

=== Robertson ===
Date	Firm	Sample size	Margin of error	Primary vote						2PP vote	
Date	Firm	Sample size	Margin of error	LIB	ALP	GRN	ONP	IND	OTH	ALP	LIB
3 May 2025	2025 federal election			30.4%	44.8%	9.0%	6.9%	3.3%	6.6%	59.4%	40.6%
27 Feb – 26 Mar 2025	YouGov (MRP)	10,217	—N/a	38.4%	32.5%	11.8%	7.5%	7.1%	2.6%	50.1%	49.9%
22 Jan – 12 Feb 2025	YouGov (MRP)	8,732	—N/a	39.6%	32.2%	9.4%	9.1%	7.9%	1.9%	48.1%	51.9%
29 Oct – 20 Nov 2024	Accent/RedBridge (MRP)	4,909	—N/a	45%	33%	10%	—N/a	—N/a	12%	47%	53%
10 Jul – 27 Aug 2024	Accent/RedBridge (MRP)	5,976	—N/a	43%	33%	11%	—N/a	—N/a	13%	49%	51%
21 May 2022	2022 federal election			40%	37.7%	10%	3.8%	—	8.5%	52.3%	47.7%

=== Shortland ===
Date	Firm	Sample size	Margin of error	Primary vote						2PP vote	
Date	Firm	Sample size	Margin of error	ALP	LIB	GRN	ONP	IND	OTH	ALP	LIB
3 May 2025	2025 federal election			44.6%	26.2%	11.3%	9.1%	4.5%	3.3%	61.5%	38.5%
27 Feb – 26 Mar 2025	YouGov (MRP)	10,217	—N/a	34.6%	34%	12%	8.8%	7.4%	3.2%	53%	47%
22 Jan – 12 Feb 2025	YouGov (MRP)	8,732	—N/a	33.2%	35.8%	8.9%	10.8%	8.3%	3%	50%	50%
29 Oct – 20 Nov 2024	Accent/RedBridge (MRP)	4,909	—N/a	41%	41%	7%	—N/a	—N/a	11%	51%	49%
10 Jul – 27 Aug 2024	Accent/RedBridge (MRP)	5,976	—N/a	37%	37%	12%	—N/a	—N/a	15%	53%	47%
21 May 2022	2022 federal election			40%	32.1%	9.9%	6.4%	2.6%	9.1%	55.8%	44.2%

=== Sydney ===
Date	Firm	Sample size	Margin of error	Primary vote						2CP vote	
Date	Firm	Sample size	Margin of error	ALP	GRN	LIB	ONP	IND	OTH	ALP	GRN
3 May 2025	2025 federal election			55.2%	21.6%	17.6%	3.4%	—	2.2%	70.9%	29.1%
27 Feb – 26 Mar 2025	YouGov (MRP)	10,217	—N/a	44.5%	23.9%	20.2%	4.9%	4.2%	2.4%	63.3%	36.7%
17 – 18 Mar 2025	uComms	860	—N/a	41.1%	18.8%	16.0%	—N/a	—N/a	10.6% (Note: 3.6% for Socialist Alliance and 7.0% for all others.)	66%	34%
22 Jan – 12 Feb 2025	YouGov (MRP)	8,732	—N/a	46.3%	24.3%	19.5%	4.8%	3.8%	1.3%	62.6%	37.4%
29 Oct – 20 Nov 2024	Accent/RedBridge (MRP)	4,909	—N/a	44%	23%	21%	—N/a	—N/a	12%	63%	37%
10 Jul – 27 Aug 2024	Accent/RedBridge (MRP)	5,976	—N/a	52%	18%	23%	—N/a	—N/a	6%	70%	30%
21 May 2022	2022 federal election			50.8%	23%	19.7%	1.8%	—	4.7%	66.7%	33.3%

=== Warringah ===
Date	Firm	Sample size	Margin of error	Primary vote						2CP vote	
Date	Firm	Sample size	Margin of error	IND	LIB	ALP	GRN	ONP	OTH	IND	LIB
3 May 2025	2025 federal election			39.7%	31.7%	14.6%	8.8%	1.7%	3.5%	61.2%	38.8%
1–29 Apr 2025	YouGov (MRP)	10,822	—N/a	44.3%	28.1%	15.4%	8.4%	3.2%	0.6%	63.5%	36.5%
5–7 Mar 2025	Freshwater Strategy	830	—N/a	33%	41%	7%	7%	—N/a	12%	Win	Loss
27 Feb – 26 Mar 2025	YouGov (MRP)	10,217	—N/a	40.9%	31.5%	15.5%	9.3%	2.4%	0.4%	59.6%	40.4%
22 Jan – 12 Feb 2025	YouGov (MRP)	8,732	—N/a	37%	31.9%	16.4%	11%	3.2%	0.6%	59.2%	40.8%
29 Oct – 20 Nov 2024	Accent/RedBridge (MRP)	4,909	—N/a	—N/a	36%	17%	7%	—N/a	40%	55%	45%
10 Jul – 27 Aug 2024	Accent/RedBridge (MRP)	5,976	—N/a	—N/a	37%	17%	10%	—N/a	36%	58%	42%
21 May 2022	2022 federal election			44.8%	33.4%	8.4%	7.4%	2.1%	3.9%	61%	39%

=== Watson ===
Date	Firm	Sample size	Margin of error	Primary vote						2PP vote	
Date	Firm	Sample size	Margin of error	ALP	LIB	GRN	ONP	IND	OTH	ALP	LIB
3 May 2025	2025 federal election			48.0%	15.2%	8.9%	3.2%	16.1%	8.6%	66.5%	43.5%
27 Feb – 26 Mar 2025	YouGov (MRP)	10,217	—N/a	39.8%	29.7%	12.6%	10.7%	3.8%	3.4%	57.3%	42.7%
22 Jan – 12 Feb 2025	YouGov (MRP)	8,732	—N/a	42.1%	28.1%	13.9%	7.4%	5.4%	3.1%	60.2%	39.8%
29 Oct – 20 Nov 2024	Accent/RedBridge (MRP)	4,909	—N/a	41%	38%	11%	—N/a	—N/a	11%	54%	46%
10 Jul – 27 Aug 2024	Accent/RedBridge (MRP)	5,976	—N/a	40%	30%	14%	—N/a	—N/a	17%	58%	42%
21 May 2022	2022 federal election			51.9%	26.6%	9.6%	4.9%	—	7.2%	65.1%	34.9%

=== Wentworth ===
Date	Firm	Sample size	Margin of error	Primary vote						2CP vote	
Date	Firm	Sample size	Margin of error	LIB	IND	ALP	GRN	ONP	OTH	IND	LIB
3 May 2025	2025 federal election			36.3%	36.5%	13.4%	10.2%	2.4%	1.2%	58.3%	41.7%
1–29 Apr 2025	YouGov (MRP)	10,822	—N/a	30.4%	32.7%	20.6%	11.5%	4.9%	—N/a	58.4%	41.6%
18 Apr 2025 (released)	Compass Polling	627	—N/a	47%	28%	15%	10%	—N/a	—N/a	—N/a	—N/a
9 Apr 2025 (released)	uComms (Note: Commissioned by Climate 200.)	1,015	—N/a	32.9%	32.5%	12.2%	—N/a	—N/a	—N/a	58%	42%
5–7 Mar 2025	Freshwater Strategy	830	—N/a	41%	33%	7%	7%	—N/a	12%	Win	Loss
27 Feb – 26 Mar 2025	YouGov (MRP)	10,217	—N/a	35%	29.3%	20.7%	12%	2.3%	0.6%	53.6%	46.4%
12 Feb 2025	uComms	1,068	—N/a	35.0%	32.6%	14.7%	10.8%	—N/a	—N/a	—N/a	—N/a
22 Jan – 12 Feb 2025	YouGov (MRP)	8,732	—N/a	34.4%	28.1%	20.7%	13.1%	3.2%	0.6%	55%	45%
29 Oct – 20 Nov 2024	Accent/RedBridge (MRP)	4,909	—N/a	38%	—N/a	17%	8%	—N/a	37%	54%	46%
10 Jul – 27 Aug 2024	Accent/RedBridge (MRP)	5,976	—N/a	40%	—N/a	17%	9%	—N/a	33%	55%	45%
5 Feb 2024	uComms	643	±3.85%	35.5%	32.1%	13.1%	10%	—N/a	2.9%	57%	43.0%
21 May 2022	2022 federal election			40.5%	35.8%	10.9%	8.3%	1%	3.6%	54.2%	45.8%

=== Werriwa ===
Date	Firm	Sample size	Margin of error	Primary vote						2PP vote	
Date	Firm	Sample size	Margin of error	ALP	LIB	GRN	ONP	IND	OTH	ALP	LIB
3 May 2025	2025 federal election			40.8%	30.8%	11.1%	4.0%	2.6%	9.6%	56.8%	43.2%
1–29 Apr 2025	YouGov (MRP)	10,822	—N/a	31.8%	26.5%	10.3%	10.6%	3.2%	17.6%	53.3%	46.7%
27 Feb – 26 Mar 2025	YouGov (MRP)	10,217	—N/a	30.7%	36.2%	11.1%	9%	4.6%	8.5%	49.4%	50.6%
22 Jan – 12 Feb 2025	YouGov (MRP)	8,732	—N/a	32.7%	37.6%	11%	9.1%	4.4%	5.2%	49.4%	50.6%
29 Oct – 20 Nov 2024	Accent/RedBridge (MRP)	4,909	—N/a	37%	38%	8%	—N/a	—N/a	17%	51%	49%
10 Jul – 27 Aug 2024	Accent/RedBridge (MRP)	5,976	—N/a	39%	35%	7%	—N/a	—N/a	19%	54%	46%
21 May 2022	2022 federal election			39.9%	30.7%	6.7%	5.1%	—	17.7%	55.8%	44.2%

=== Whitlam ===
Date	Firm	Sample size	Margin of error	Primary vote						2PP vote	
Date	Firm	Sample size	Margin of error	ALP	LIB	GRN	ONP	IND	OTH	ALP	LIB
3 May 2025	2025 federal election			38.6%	28.3%	12.4%	7.7%	9.7%	3.3%	56.2%	43.8%
1–29 Apr 2025	YouGov (MRP)	10,822	—N/a	39.3%	26.5%	12.5%	8.8%	6.8%	6.2%	59.2%	40.8%
6 Apr 2025	Ben Britton disendorsed as Liberal candidate and replaced by Nathaniel Smith										
3 Apr 2025	Nationals candidate Katrina Hodgkinson withdraws and endorses the Liberals										
27 Feb – 26 Mar 2025	YouGov (MRP)	10,217	—N/a	35%	33.2%	11.4%	11.3%	5.5%	3.6%	52.9%	47.1%
22 Jan – 12 Feb 2025	YouGov (MRP)	8,732	—N/a	33.8%	35%	10.2%	12.2%	5.8%	2.9%	50.6%	49.4%
29 Oct – 20 Nov 2024	Accent/RedBridge (MRP)	4,909	—N/a	37%	33%	12%	—N/a	—N/a	17%	55%	45%
10 Jul – 27 Aug 2024	Accent/RedBridge (MRP)	5,976	—N/a	36%	34%	15%	—N/a	—N/a	16%	54%	46%
21 May 2022	2022 federal election			45%	28.2%	10.8%	6.9%	—	9.1%	60.1%	39.9%

== Northern Territory ==
=== Lingiari ===
Date	Firm	Sample size	Margin of error	Primary vote						2PP vote	
Date	Firm	Sample size	Margin of error	ALP	CLP	GRN	ONP	IND	OTH	ALP	CLP
3 May 2025	2025 federal election			44.6%	31.0%	10.2%	9.1%	—	5.1%	58.1%	41.9%
1–29 Apr 2025	YouGov (MRP)	10,822	—N/a	40.9%	27.2%	12.2%	13%	—N/a	6.7%	58%	42%
3 Feb – 1 Apr 2025	Accent/RedBridge (MRP)	9,953	—N/a	28%	26%	12%	—N/a	—N/a	35%	49%	51%
27 Feb - 26 Mar 2025	YouGov (MRP)	10,217	—N/a	35.2%	32.1%	14.2%	9.9%	6%	2.5%	54.6%	45.4%
22 Jan – 12 Feb 2025	YouGov (MRP)	8,732	—N/a	37.5%	28.7%	14.3%	10.3%	6.6%	2.7%	57.2%	42.8%
29 Oct – 20 Nov 2024	Accent/RedBridge (MRP)	4,909	—N/a	33%	38%	9%	—N/a	—N/a	21%	46%	54%
10 Jul – 27 Aug 2024	Accent/RedBridge (MRP)	5,976	—N/a	30%	36%	12%	—N/a	—N/a	22%	47%	53%
Feb – May 2024	Accent/RedBridge (MRP)	4,040	—N/a	30%	33%	8%	—N/a	—N/a	29%	50%	50%
21 May 2022	2022 federal election			36.6%	34.7%	11.0%	5.4%	3.0%	9.4%	51.0%	49.0%

=== Solomon ===
Date	Firm	Sample size	Margin of error	Primary vote						2PP vote	
Date	Firm	Sample size	Margin of error	ALP	CLP	GRN	ONP	IND	OTH	ALP	CLP
3 May 2025	2025 federal election			32.8%	36.0%	10.3%	6.7%	13.6%	0.6%	51.3%	48.7%
1–29 Apr 2025	YouGov (MRP)	10,822	—N/a	36.6%	25.9%	20%	8%	2.2%	7.4%	59.7%	40.3%
3 Feb – 1 Apr 2025	Accent/RedBridge (MRP)	9,953	—N/a	45%	27%	12%	—N/a	—N/a	16%	61%	39%
27 Feb - 26 Mar 2025	YouGov (MRP)	10,217	—N/a	34.2%	29.9%	15.1%	7.6%	5.1%	8.1%	55.7%	44.3%
22 Jan – 12 Feb 2025	YouGov (MRP)	8,732	—N/a	32.3%	32.8%	15.6%	8.9%	4.8%	5.6%	53%	47%
29 Oct – 20 Nov 2024	Accent/RedBridge (MRP)	4,909	—N/a	45%	29%	14%	—N/a	—N/a	12%	61%	39%
10 Jul – 27 Aug 2024	Accent/RedBridge (MRP)	5,976	—N/a	46%	26%	13%	—N/a	—N/a	25%	62%	38%
Feb – May 2024	Accent/RedBridge (MRP)	4,040	—N/a	38%	28%	14%	—N/a	—N/a	19%	61%	39%
21 May 2022	2022 federal election			39.5%	25%	14.8%	5.4%	—	15.4%	59.4%	40.6%

== Queensland ==
=== Blair ===
Date	Firm	Sample size	Margin of error	Primary vote						2PP vote	
Date	Firm	Sample size	Margin of error	ALP	LNP	GRN	ONP	IND	OTH	ALP	LNP
3 May 2025	2025 federal election			36.6%	27.2%	10.3%	9.7%	—	15.2%	55.7%	44.3%
24 Apr 2025	KJC Research	600	—N/a	—N/a	—N/a	—N/a	—N/a	—N/a	—N/a	41%	46%
27 Feb – 26 Mar 2025	YouGov (MRP)	10,217	—N/a	31.6%	32.4%	12.5%	14.2%	4.2%	4%	51.6%	48.4%
22 Jan – 12 Feb 2025	YouGov (MRP)	8,732	—N/a	32.7%	32.9%	11.7%	15.8%	4.5%	2.5%	50.8%	49.2%
29 Oct – 20 Nov 2024	Accent/RedBridge (MRP)	4,909	—N/a	34%	28%	15%	—N/a	—N/a	23%	56%	44%
10 Jul – 27 Aug 2024	Accent/RedBridge (MRP)	5,976	—N/a	34%	30%	16%	—N/a	—N/a	19%	56%	44%
21 May 2022	2022 federal election			35%	28.9%	12.6%	10%	—	13.5%	55.2%	44.8%

=== Bonner ===
Date	Firm	Sample size	Margin of error	Primary vote						2PP vote	
Date	Firm	Sample size	Margin of error	LNP	ALP	GRN	ONP	IND	OTH	LNP	ALP
3 May 2025	2025 federal election			35.5%	39.5%	12.4%	3.8%	—	8.8%	45.0%	55.0%
27 Feb – 26 Mar 2025	YouGov (MRP)	10,217	—N/a	41.7%	27.3%	15.6%	8.6%	5.2%	1.6%	53.6%	46.4%
22 Jan – 12 Feb 2025	YouGov (MRP)	8,732	—N/a	43.8%	28.3%	14.4%	7.3%	5.4%	0.9%	54.4%	45.6%
29 Oct – 20 Nov 2024	Accent/RedBridge (MRP)	4,909	—N/a	47%	32%	12%	—N/a	—N/a	9%	55%	45%
10 Jul – 27 Aug 2024	Accent/RedBridge (MRP)	5,976	—N/a	46%	27%	17%	—N/a	—N/a	10%	55%	45%
21 May 2022	2022 federal election			44.8%	29.6%	16.8%	5.6%	—	3.3%	53.4%	46.6%

=== Bowman ===
Date	Firm	Sample size	Margin of error	Primary vote						2PP vote	
Date	Firm	Sample size	Margin of error	LNP	ALP	GRN	ONP	IND	OTH	LNP	ALP
3 May 2025	2025 federal election			39.6%	31.7%	11.8%	7.1%	3.1%	6.7%	52.4%	47.6%
27 Feb – 26 Mar 2025	YouGov (MRP)	10,217	—N/a	42.1%	26%	12.4%	11%	4.9%	3.5%	55.8%	44.2%
22 Jan – 12 Feb 2025	YouGov (MRP)	8,732	—N/a	45.5%	25.1%	10.8%	10.7%	6.1%	1.9%	58.5%	41.5%
29 Oct – 20 Nov 2024	Accent/RedBridge (MRP)	4,909	—N/a	52%	30%	11%	—N/a	—N/a	8%	59%	41%
10 Jul – 27 Aug 2024	Accent/RedBridge (MRP)	5,976	—N/a	44%	27%	13%	—N/a	—N/a	16%	57%	43%
21 May 2022	2022 federal election			42.4%	29.2%	13%	7.7%	—	7.6%	55.5%	44.5%

=== Brisbane ===
Date	Firm	Sample size	Margin of error	Primary vote						2PP vote		
Date	Firm	Sample size	Margin of error	LNP	ALP	GRN	ONP	IND	OTH	GRN	LNP	ALP
3 May 2025	2025 federal election			34.3%	32.1%	25.9%	2.5%	—	5.2%	—	41.0%	59.0%
1–29 Apr 2025	YouGov (MRP)	10,822	—N/a	24.7%	32.3%	23.3%	7.6%	—N/a	12.2%	52.7%	47.3%	—N/a (Note: The YouGov MRP projected Labor would win Brisbane, but the party was not shown in the projected two-candidate-preferred vote.)
Mid-Apr 2025	DemosAU (Note: The polling figures published by The Courier-Mail are a combined primary vote average from the electorates of Brisbane, Griffith and Ryan.)	—N/a	—N/a	36%	29%	29%	—N/a	—N/a	—N/a	—N/a	—N/a	—N/a
17 Apr 2025 (released)	JWS Research (Note: Commissioned by Australian Energy Producers)	c. 800	—N/a	—N/a	—N/a	—N/a	—N/a	—N/a	—N/a	—N/a	49%	51%
3 Feb – 1 Apr 2025	Accent/RedBridge (MRP)	9,953	—N/a	45%	21%	28%	—N/a	—N/a	6%	48%	53%	—N/a
20 Mar 2025	uComms (Note: Commissioned by Liberals against Nuclear)	1,184	—	32.1%	23.2%	24.2%	—	—	20.5%	52%	48%	—N/a
20 Mar 2025	uComms	1,184	—	32.1%	23.2%	24.2%	—	—	20.5%	—N/a	44%	56%
16 Mar 2025 (released)	Insightfully (Note: Commissioned by Advance)	600	—N/a	36.4%	29.5%	18.1%	—N/a	9.7%	6.3%	47.0%	53.0%	—N/a
27 Feb – 26 Mar 2025	YouGov (MRP)	10,217	—N/a	35.4%	31.3%	25%	3.1%	2.9%	2.3%	—N/a	44.9%	55.1%
22 Jan – 12 Feb 2025	YouGov (MRP)	8.732	—N/a	35.7%	30%	23.7%	4.3%	4.4%	1.9%	—N/a	46.3%	53.7%
11–17 Dec 2024	Pyxis	400	±4.2%	—N/a	—N/a	—N/a	—N/a	—N/a	—N/a	—N/a	—N/a	—N/a
29 Oct – 20 Nov 2024	Accent/RedBridge (MRP)	4.909	—N/a	37%	25%	31%	—N/a	—N/a	7%	55%	45%	—N/a
10 Jul – 27 Aug 2024	Accent/RedBridge (MRP)	5,976	—N/a	39%	22%	29%	—N/a	—N/a	10%	52%	48%	—N/a
Feb – May 2024	Accent/RedBridge (MRP)	4,040	—N/a	41%	29%	22%	—N/a	—N/a	8%	50%	50%	—N/a
21 May 2022	2022 federal election			37.7%	27.3%	27.2%	2.2%	—	5.6%	53.7%	46.3%	—N/a

=== Capricornia ===
Date	Firm	Sample size	Margin of error	Primary vote						2PP vote	
Date	Firm	Sample size	Margin of error	LNP	ALP	ONP	GRN	IND	OTH	LNP	ALP
3 May 2025	2025 federal election			36.6%	31.9%	15.5%	6.2%	—	9.8%	55.8%	44.2%
27 Feb – 26 Mar 2025	YouGov (MRP)	10,217	—N/a	39.3%	23.8%	21.2%	7.8%	5.1%	2.7%	58.9%	41.1%
22 Jan – 12 Feb 2025	YouGov (MRP)	8,732	—N/a	41.2%	25.6%	20.6%	6.2%	5.3%	1.1%	59.4%	40.6%
29 Oct – 20 Nov 2024	Accent/RedBridge (MRP)	4,909	—N/a	45%	26%	—N/a	5%	—N/a	23%	60%	40%
10 Jul – 27 Aug 2024	Accent/RedBridge (MRP)	5,976	—N/a	42%	27%	—N/a	7%	—N/a	24%	58%	42%
21 May 2022	2022 federal election			39.4%	28.1%	14.6%	5.9%	3.4%	8.7%	56.6%	43.4%

=== Dawson ===
Date	Firm	Sample size	Margin of error	Primary vote						2PP vote	
Date	Firm	Sample size	Margin of error	LNP	ALP	ONP	GRN	IND	OTH	LNP	ALP
3 May 2025	2025 federal election			41.7%	26.2%	10.4%	7.0%	—	14.7%	61.8%	38.2%
27 Feb – 26 Mar 2025	YouGov (MRP)	10,217	—N/a	42.9%	21.6%	18.5%	8.4%	4.6%	3.9%	61.1%	38.9%
22 Jan – 12 Feb 2025	YouGov (MRP)	8,732	—N/a	45.3%	23.6%	18.3%	6.9%	3.8%	2.2%	61.9%	38.1%
29 Oct – 20 Nov 2024	Accent/RedBridge (MRP)	4,909	—N/a	52%	24%	—N/a	8%	—N/a	16%	64%	36%
10 Jul – 27 Aug 2024	Accent/RedBridge (MRP)	5,976	—N/a	45%	26%	—N/a	8%	—N/a	21%	60%	40%
21 May 2022	2022 federal election			43.3%	24.5%	13.3%	7.2%	—	11.7%	60.4%	39.6%

=== Dickson ===
Date	Firm	Sample size	Margin of error	Primary vote						2PP vote	
Date	Firm	Sample size	Margin of error	LNP	ALP	GRN	ONP	IND	OTH	LNP	ALP
3 May 2025	2025 federal election			34.7%	33.6%	7.6%	4.3%	12.2%	7.7%	44.0%	56.0%
17–24 Apr 2025	YouGov	253	±6%	40.3%	24.2%	7.6%	5.4%	16.5%	6.0% (Note: 1.3% for Trumpet of Patriots and 4.7% for all others.)	55%	45%
18–23 Apr 2025	DemosAU (Note: The polling figures are a combined primary vote average from the electorates of Bonner, Dickson, Forde, Longman and Petrie.)	1,053	±4.3%	40%	27%	13%	7%	5%	8% (Note: 3% for Family First, 2% for Legalise Cannabis, 2% for Trumpet of Patriots, 1% for the Australian Citizens Party, 0% for the Animal Justice Party and 0% for the Libertarian Party.)	53%	47%
10 Apr 2025 (released)	Freshwater Strategy (Note: Commissioned by the Liberal Party.)	—N/a	—N/a	—N/a	—N/a	—N/a	—N/a	—N/a	—N/a	57%	43%
10 Apr 2025 (released)	uComms	—N/a	—N/a	—N/a	—N/a	—N/a	—N/a	—N/a	—N/a	48.3%	51.7%
9–10 Apr 2025	uComms (Note: Commissioned by the Queensland Conservation Council.)	854	—N/a	37.6%	24.2%	10.9%	—N/a	12.0%	4.6%	48%	52%
27 Feb – 26 Mar 2025	YouGov (MRP)	10,217	—N/a	39.7%	28.8%	12.7%	8.6%	7.8%	2.4%	52.5%	47.5%
22 Jan – 12 Feb 2025	YouGov (MRP)	8,732	—N/a	41.3%	28.2%	12.3%	8.8%	8.2%	1.2%	53.9%	46.1%
29 Oct – 20 Nov 2024	Accent/RedBridge (MRP)	4,909	—N/a	48%	33%	6%	—N/a	—N/a	12%	56%	44%
10 Jul – 27 Aug 2024	Accent/RedBridge (MRP)	5,976	—N/a	42%	30%	9%	—N/a	—N/a	19%	55%	45%
21 May 2022	2022 federal election			42.1%	31.7%	13%	5.4%	3.9%	4.0%	51.7%	48.3%

=== Fadden ===
Date	Firm	Sample size	Margin of error	Primary vote						2PP vote	
Date	Firm	Sample size	Margin of error	LNP	ALP	GRN	ONP	IND	OTH	LNP	ALP
3 May 2025	2025 federal election			41.0%	27.4%	9.3%	8.0%	2.8%	11.5%	56.9%	43.1%
27 Feb – 26 Mar 2025	YouGov (MRP)	10,217	—N/a	42.7%	23.2%	10.8%	14.3%	5.7%	3.3%	58.4%	41.6%
22 Jan – 12 Feb 2025	YouGov (MRP)	8,732	—N/a	47.2%	21.8%	10.6%	11.5%	6.6%	2.2%	61.1%	38.9%
29 Oct – 20 Nov 2024	Accent/RedBridge (MRP)	4,909	—N/a	45%	25%	10%	—N/a	—N/a	19%	59%	41%
10 Jul – 27 Aug 2024	Accent/RedBridge (MRP)	5,976	—N/a	43%	25%	11%	—N/a	—N/a	22%	58%	42%
15 Jul 2023	2023 by-election			49.1%	22.1%	6.2%	8.9%	2.7%	11.1%	63.4%	36.7%
21 May 2022	2022 federal election			44.6%	22.4%	10.7%	8.7%	4.2%	9.5%	60.6%	39.4%

=== Fairfax ===
Date	Firm	Sample size	Margin of error	Primary vote						2PP vote	
Date	Firm	Sample size	Margin of error	LNP	ALP	GRN	ONP	IND	OTH	LNP	ALP
3 May 2025	2025 federal election			37.9%	24.9%	10.2%	7.4%	13.4%	6.2%	53.2%	46.8%
27 Feb – 26 Mar 2025	YouGov (MRP)	10,217	—N/a	41.2%	22.2%	12.3%	12.9%	7.7%	3.7%	57.4%	42.6%
22 Jan – 12 Feb 2025	YouGov (MRP)	8,732	—N/a	45.3%	21.2%	12.8%	11.2%	7.3%	2.2%	59.8%	40.2%
29 Oct – 20 Nov 2024	Accent/RedBridge (MRP)	4,909	—N/a	45%	22%	9%	—N/a	—N/a	24%	61%	39%
10 Jul – 27 Aug 2024	Accent/RedBridge (MRP)	5,976	—N/a	42%	24%	9%	—N/a	—N/a	25%	58%	42%
21 May 2022	2022 federal election			44.9%	21.9%	13.4%	6.6%	2.1%	11.2%	59%	41.1%

=== Fisher ===
Date	Firm	Sample size	Margin of error	Primary vote						2PP vote		
Date	Firm	Sample size	Margin of error	LNP	ALP	GRN	ONP	IND	OTH	LNP	ALP	IND
3 May 2025	2025 federal election			37.2%	22.3%	9.6%	6.1%	16.3%	8.5%	56.0%	44.0%	—
27 Feb – 26 Mar 2025	YouGov (MRP)	10,217	—N/a	41.6%	21.2%	13.1%	14.4%	6.4%	3.3%	58.2%	41.8%	—N/a
Late Feb 2025	Climate 200	—N/a	±3%	43%	—N/a	—N/a	—N/a	—N/a	—N/a	Win	—N/a	Loss
22 Jan – 12 Feb 2025	YouGov (MRP)	8,732	—N/a	45.2%	23.3%	12%	12%	5.7%	1.9%	59.2%	40.8%	—N/a
29 Oct – 20 Nov 2024	Accent/RedBridge (MRP)	4,909	—N/a	49%	25%	8%	—N/a	—N/a	17%	62%	38%	—N/a
10 Jul – 27 Aug 2024	Accent/RedBridge (MRP)	5,976	—N/a	44%	25%	11%	—N/a	—N/a	20%	59%	41%	—N/a
21 May 2022	2022 federal election			44.3%	23.3%	13.8%	9.3%	—	9.3%	58.7%	41.3%	—

=== Flynn ===
Date	Firm	Sample size	Margin of error	Primary vote						2PP vote	
Date	Firm	Sample size	Margin of error	LNP	ALP	ONP	GRN	IND	OTH	LNP	ALP
3 May 2025	2025 federal election			37.4%	25.1%	14.2%	5.7%	5.0%	12.6%	60.2%	39.8%
27 Feb – 26 Mar 2025	YouGov (MRP)	10,217	—N/a	36.8%	25.7%	22.1%	6.2%	6.2%	3.1%	57%	43%
22 Jan – 12 Feb 2025	YouGov (MRP)	8,732	—N/a	38.2%	27.3%	19.2%	6.6%	6.6%	2.1%	56.5%	43.5%
29 Oct – 20 Nov 2024	Accent/RedBridge (MRP)	4,909	—N/a	45%	32%	—N/a	5%	—N/a	18%	58%	42%
10 Jul – 27 Aug 2024	Accent/RedBridge (MRP)	5,976	—N/a	40%	30%	—N/a	9%	—N/a	21%	55%	45%
21 May 2022	2022 federal election			36.9%	33.5%	12.2%	4.3%	4.1%	9%	53.8%	46.2%

=== Forde ===
Date	Firm	Sample size	Margin of error	Primary vote						2PP vote	
Date	Firm	Sample size	Margin of error	LNP	ALP	GRN	ONP	IND	OTH	LNP	ALP
3 May 2025	2025 federal election			30.7%	34.2%	11.4%	10.3%	3.0%	10.4%	48.2%	51.8%
27 Feb – 26 Mar 2025	YouGov (MRP)	10,217	—N/a	36.9%	25.1%	11.4%	14.2%	7.2%	5.2%	54.3%	45.7%
22 Jan – 12 Feb 2025	YouGov (MRP)	8,732	—N/a	38.9%	26%	13.3%	12%	6.3%	3.3%	54.8%	45.2%
29 Oct – 20 Nov 2024	Accent/RedBridge (MRP)	4,909	—N/a	37%	26%	16%	—N/a	—N/a	21%	53%	47%
10 Jul – 27 Aug 2024	Accent/RedBridge (MRP)	5,976	—N/a	35%	30%	15%	—N/a	—N/a	21%	51%	49%
21 May 2022	2022 federal election			36.9%	28%	9.9%	8%	3.1%	14.1%	54.2%	45.8%

=== Griffith ===
Date	Firm	Sample size	Margin of error	Primary vote						2CP vote		
Date	Firm	Sample size	Margin of error	GRN	LNP	ALP	ONP	IND	OTH	GRN	LNP	ALP
3 May 2025	2025 federal election			31.6%	26.6%	34.5%	2.5%	—	4.8%	39.4%	—	60.6%
1–29 Apr 2025	YouGov (MRP)	10,822	—N/a	38%	25.6%	27.2%	5.5%	—N/a	3.7%	52%	—N/a	48%
Mid-Apr 2025	DemosAU	—N/a	—N/a	29%	36%	29%	—N/a	—N/a	—N/a	—N/a	—N/a	—N/a
17 Apr 2025 (released)	JWS Research	c. 800	—N/a	—N/a	—N/a	—N/a	—N/a	—N/a	—N/a	—N/a	49%	51%
17 Apr 2025 (released)	JWS Research	c. 800	—N/a	—N/a	—N/a	—N/a	—N/a	—N/a	—N/a	47%	53%	—N/a
3 Feb – 1 Apr 2025	Accent/RedBridge (MRP)	9,953	—N/a	35%	31%	25%	—N/a	—N/a	9%	59%	41%	—N/a
16 Mar 2025 (released)	Insightfully	600	—N/a	31.3%	38.6%	22.6%	—N/a	1.5%	5.9%	—N/a	—N/a	—N/a
27 Feb – 26 Mar 2025	YouGov (MRP)	10,217	—N/a	30.5%	29.8%	32.5%	4%	1.8%	1.4%	45.2%	—N/a	54.8%
22 Jan – 12 Feb 2025	YouGov (MRP)	8,732	—N/a	30.7%	29.3%	31.9%	3.5%	3.6%	1%	47.1%	—N/a	52.9%
17–19 Dec 2024	Pyxis	400	±4.3%	—N/a	—N/a	—N/a	—N/a	—N/a	—N/a	—N/a	—N/a	—N/a
29 Oct – 20 Nov 2024	Accent/RedBridge (MRP)	4,909	—N/a	34%	29%	26%	—N/a	—N/a	10%	59%	41%	—N/a
10 Jul – 27 Aug 2024	Accent/RedBridge (MRP)	5,976	—N/a	38%	31%	20%	—N/a	—N/a	11%	58%	42%	—N/a
Feb – May 2024	Accent/RedBridge (MRP)	4,040	—N/a	29%	30%	30%	—N/a	—N/a	12	59%	41%	—N/a
21 May 2022	2022 federal election			34.6%	30.7%	28.9%	3.3%	—	2.4%	60.5%	39.5%	—

=== Groom ===
Date	Firm	Sample size	Margin of error	Primary vote						2CP vote		
Date	Firm	Sample size	Margin of error	LNP	ALP	IND	ONP	GRN	OTH	LNP	IND	ALP
3 May 2025	2025 federal election			41.0%	16.6%	17.1%	9.6%	5.6%	10.1%	55.7%	44.3%	—
27 Feb – 26 Mar 2025	YouGov (MRP)	10,217	—N/a	43.6%	19.3%	12.1%	14.9%	8.4%	1.7%	61.2%	—N/a	38.8%
22 Jan – 12 Feb 2025	YouGov (MRP)	8,732	—N/a	45.3%	18.2%	13.6%	14.4%	7.3%	1.2%	62.9%	—N/a	37.1%
29 Oct – 20 Nov 2024	Accent/RedBridge (MRP)	4,909	—N/a	46%	24%	—N/a	—N/a	7%	24%	55%	45%	—N/a
10 Jul – 27 Aug 2024	Accent/RedBridge (MRP)	5,976	—N/a	44%	27%	—N/a	—N/a	5%	24%	53%	47%	—N/a
Feb – May 2024	Accent/RedBridge (MRP)	4,040	—N/a	45%	20%	—N/a	7%	—N/a	28%	55%	45%	—N/a
21 May 2022	2022 federal election			43.7%	18.7%	15.4%	9.6%	5.85%	6.7%	56.9%	43.1%	—

=== Herbert ===
Date	Firm	Sample size	Margin of error	Primary vote						2PP vote	
Date	Firm	Sample size	Margin of error	LNP	ALP	GRN	ONP	IND	OTH	LNP	ALP
3 May 2025	2025 federal election			48.7%	23.0%	9.4%	5.2%	—	13.7%	63.4%	36.6%
27 Feb – 26 Mar 2025	YouGov (MRP)	10,217	—N/a	45%	23.6%	10.3%	9%	6.8%	5.2%	58.6%	41.4%
22 Jan – 12 Feb 2025	YouGov (MRP)	8,732	—N/a	45.2%	21.1%	9.8%	11.8%	7.8%	4.3%	60.7%	39.3%
29 Oct – 20 Nov 2024	Accent/RedBridge (MRP)	4,909	—N/a	49%	23%	9%	—N/a	—N/a	19%	62%	38%
10 Jul – 27 Aug 2024	Accent/RedBridge (MRP)	5,976	—N/a	46%	27%	8%	—N/a	—N/a	19%	58%	42%
21 May 2022	2022 federal election			47%	21.6%	8.2%	5.3%	4.3%	13.7%	61.8%	38.2%

=== Hinkler ===
Date	Firm	Sample size	Margin of error	Primary vote						2PP vote	
Date	Firm	Sample size	Margin of error	LNP	ALP	IND	ONP	GRN	OTH	LNP	ALP
3 May 2025	2025 federal election			38.0%	31.2%	2.9%	13.3%	7.3%	7.3%	56.3%	43.7%
27 Feb – 26 Mar 2025	YouGov (MRP)	10,217	—N/a	41.9%	22.9%	11%	15%	7.2%	2%	58.9%	41.1%
22 Jan – 12 Feb 2025	YouGov (MRP)	8,732	—N/a	43.2%	20.2%	15.8%	13.4%	6.1%	1.4%	60.7%	39.3%
29 Oct – 20 Nov 2024	Accent/RedBridge (MRP)	4,909	—N/a	49%	29%	—N/a	—N/a	7%	15%	59%	41%
10 Jul – 27 Aug 2024	Accent/RedBridge (MRP)	5,976	—N/a	44%	29%	—N/a	—N/a	6%	20%	57%	43%
21 May 2022	2022 federal election			42.1%	23.3%	13.1%	8.7%	5.5%	7.3%	60.1%	39.9%

=== Kennedy ===
Date	Firm	Sample size	Margin of error	Primary vote					2CP vote	
Date	Firm	Sample size	Margin of error	OTH	LNP	ALP	GRN	IND	KAP	LNP
3 May 2025	2025 federal election			52.2%	23.8%	16.4%	5.9%	1.7%	65.8%	34.2%
3 Feb – 1 Apr 2025	Accent/RedBridge (MRP)	9,953	—N/a	48%	29%	17%	6%	—N/a	62%	38%
27 Feb – 26 Mar 2025	YouGov (MRP)	10,217	—N/a	46.5%	27.5%	15.6%	7.8%	2.6%	65.2%	34.8%
22 Jan – 12 Feb 2025	YouGov (MRP)	8,732	—N/a	42.2%	33%	14.3%	7.7%	2.9%	60.7%	39.3%
29 Oct – 20 Nov 2024	Accent/RedBridge (MRP)	4,909	—N/a	45%	27%	19%	8%	—N/a	58%	42%
10 Jul – 27 Aug 2024	Accent/RedBridge (MRP)	5,976	—N/a	40%	32%	22%	6%	—N/a	60%	40%
21 May 2022	2022 federal election			46.%	28.2%	16.1%	6.4%	3.2%	63.1%	36.9%

=== Leichhardt ===
Date	Firm	Sample size	Margin of error	Primary vote						2PP vote	
Date	Firm	Sample size	Margin of error	LNP	ALP	GRN	ONP	IND	OTH	LNP	ALP
3 May 2025	2025 federal election			27.3%	36.5%	9.3%	8.0%	1.8%	14.8%	44.0%	56.0%
27 Feb – 26 Mar 2025	YouGov (MRP)	10,217	—N/a	37.1%	26.1%	12.5%	11.8%	5.3%	7.1%	53.3%	46.7%
22 Jan – 12 Feb 2025	YouGov (MRP)	8,732	—N/a	37.5%	27.5%	12.2%	13.5%	5.6%	3.6%	53.5%	46.5%
29 Oct – 20 Nov 2024	Accent/RedBridge (MRP)	4,909	—N/a	41%	30%	9%	—N/a	—N/a	20%	54%	46%
10 Jul – 27 Aug 2024	Accent/RedBridge (MRP)	5,976	—N/a	34%	31%	6%	—N/a	—N/a	29%	52%	48%
21 May 2022	2022 federal election			36.7%	27.6%	10%	7.4%	—	18.3%	53.4%	46.6%

=== Lilley ===
Date	Firm	Sample size	Margin of error	Primary vote						2PP vote	
Date	Firm	Sample size	Margin of error	ALP	LNP	GRN	ONP	IND	OTH	ALP	LNP
3 May 2025	2025 federal election			46.1%	27.7%	16.4%	4.2%	—	5.6%	64.5%	35.5%
27 Feb – 26 Mar 2025	YouGov (MRP)	10,217	—N/a	38.4%	30.8%	16.4%	6.6%	5%	2.8%	57.9%	42.1%
22 Jan – 12 Feb 2025	YouGov (MRP)	8,732	—N/a	36.8%	32.6%	15.2%	7.5%	6%	1.9%	55.7%	44.3%
29 Oct – 20 Nov 2024	Accent/RedBridge (MRP)	4,909	—N/a	44%	34%	17%	—N/a	—N/a	5%	60%	40%
10 Jul – 27 Aug 2024	Accent/RedBridge (MRP)	5,976	—N/a	39%	31%	22%	—N/a	—N/a	8%	61%	39%
21 May 2022	2022 federal election			41.8%	29.8%	17.1%	4.1%	—	7.2%	60.5%	39.5%

=== Longman ===
Date	Firm	Sample size	Margin of error	Primary vote						2PP vote	
Date	Firm	Sample size	Margin of error	LNP	ALP	ONP	GRN	IND	OTH	LNP	ALP
3 May 2025	2025 federal election			36.1%	35.5%	9.9%	9.8%	—	8.7%	50.1%	49.9%
27 Feb – 26 Mar 2025	YouGov (MRP)	10,217	—N/a	38.3%	27.6%	13.3%	9.5%	4.6%	6.7%	54.4%	45.6%
22 Jan – 12 Feb 2025	YouGov (MRP)	8,732	—N/a	39.9%	26.6%	14.6%	8.6%	6%	4.4%	56.3%	43.7%
29 Oct – 20 Nov 2024	Accent/RedBridge (MRP)	4,909	—N/a	42%	31%	—N/a	10%	—N/a	16%	53%	47%
10 Jul – 27 Aug 2024	Accent/RedBridge (MRP)	5,976	—N/a	40%	32%	—N/a	9%	—N/a	18%	53%	47%
21 May 2022	2022 federal election			38.2%	31.5%	8.3%	7.2%	—	14.9%	53.1%	46.9%

=== Maranoa ===
Date	Firm	Sample size	Margin of error	Primary vote						2CP vote		
Date	Firm	Sample size	Margin of error	LNP	ALP	ONP	GRN	IND	OTH	LNP	ALP	ONP
3 May 2025	2025 federal election			53.2%	16.0%	12.3%	5.2%	—	13.3%	70.1%	—	29.9%
27 Feb – 26 Mar 2025	YouGov (MRP)	10,217	—N/a	48.6%	14.8%	24.8%	5.9%	3.5%	2.4%	67.7%	—N/a	32.3%
22 Jan – 12 Feb 2025	YouGov (MRP)	8,732	—N/a	51.8%	16.9%	18.3%	5.9%	4.8%	2.2%	72%	—N/a	28%
29 Oct – 20 Nov 2024	Accent/RedBridge (MRP)	4,909	—N/a	54%	14%	—N/a	4%	—N/a	29%	73%	27%	—N/a
10 Jul – 27 Aug 2024	Accent/RedBridge (MRP)	5,976	—N/a	52%	14%	—N/a	4%	—N/a	30%	72%	28%	—N/a
21 May 2022	2022 federal election			56.3%	15.3%	11.9%	4.9%	—	11.7%	72.1%	27.9%	—

=== McPherson ===
Date	Firm	Sample size	Margin of error	Primary vote						2PP vote		
Date	Firm	Sample size	Margin of error	LNP	ALP	GRN	ONP	IND	OTH	LNP	ALP	IND
3 May 2025	2025 federal election			35.9%	23.4%	8.4%	4.4%	13.7%	14.2%	54.4%	45.6%	—
27 Feb – 26 Mar 2025	YouGov (MRP)	10,217	—N/a	41.5%	23%	13.4%	12%	5.6%	4.5%	56.8%	43.2%	—N/a
Late Feb 2025	Climate 200	—N/a	±3%	42%	—N/a	—N/a	—N/a	—N/a	—N/a	Win	—N/a	Loss
Between Mar–Dec 2024	Climate 200	—N/a	—N/a	42%	—N/a	—N/a	—N/a	—N/a	—N/a	—N/a	—N/a	—N/a
22 Jan – 12 Feb 2025	YouGov (MRP)	8,732	—N/a	44.9%	22.8%	14.1%	10.3%	5.3%	2.7%	58.4%	41.6%	—N/a
29 Oct – 20 Nov 2024	Accent/RedBridge (MRP)	4,909	—N/a	48%	27%	7%	—N/a	—N/a	18%	61%	39%	—N/a
10 Jul – 27 Aug 2024	Accent/RedBridge (MRP)	5,976	—N/a	43%	27%	10%	—N/a	—N/a	20%	58%	42%	—N/a
21 May 2022	2022 federal election			43.6%	22%	15.4%	7.2%	—	11.8%	59.3%	40.7%	—

=== Moncrieff ===
Date	Firm	Sample size	Margin of error	Primary vote						2PP vote	
Date	Firm	Sample size	Margin of error	LNP	ALP	GRN	ONP	IND	OTH	LNP	ALP
3 May 2025	2025 federal election			41.9%	24.5%	9.5%	5.9%	9.0%	9.2%	58.8%	41.2%
27 Feb – 26 Mar 2025	YouGov (MRP)	10,217	—N/a	43.2%	22.5%	11.9%	12.2%	4.9%	5.3%	58.5%	41.5%
22 Jan – 12 Feb 2025	YouGov (MRP)	8,732	—N/a	45.7%	22.6%	12.6%	10.7%	5.3%	3.1%	59.4%	40.6%
29 Oct – 20 Nov 2024	Accent/RedBridge (MRP)	4,909	—N/a	48%	22%	11%	—N/a	—N/a	18%	61%	39%
10 Jul – 27 Aug 2024	Accent/RedBridge (MRP)	5,976	—N/a	44%	27%	9%	—N/a	—N/a	20%	58%	42%
21 May 2022	2022 federal election			45.9%	20.8%	12.1%	7.1%	—	14.1%	61.2%	38.8%

=== Moreton ===
Date	Firm	Sample size	Margin of error	Primary vote						2PP vote	
Date	Firm	Sample size	Margin of error	ALP	LNP	GRN	ONP	IND	OTH	ALP	LNP
3 May 2025	2025 federal election			42.3%	25.7%	21.7%	2.8%	—	7.5%	66.1%	43.9%
27 Feb – 26 Mar 2025	YouGov (MRP)	10,217	—N/a	35.5%	33.2%	19.1%	6.4%	3.5%	2.4%	56.1%	43.9%
22 Jan – 12 Feb 2025	YouGov (MRP)	8,732	—N/a	34.1%	35.1%	18.5%	5.6%	5.3%	1.4%	54.3%	45.7%
29 Oct – 20 Nov 2024	Accent/RedBridge (MRP)	4,909	—N/a	44%	36%	16%	—N/a	—N/a	5%	59%	41%
10 Jul – 27 Aug 2024	Accent/RedBridge (MRP)	5,976	—N/a	39%	35%	17%	—N/a	—N/a	9%	57%	43%
21 May 2022	2022 federal election			37.4%	33.3%	20.8%	3.6%	—	4.9%	59.1%	40.9%

=== Oxley ===
Date	Firm	Sample size	Margin of error	Primary vote						2PP vote	
Date	Firm	Sample size	Margin of error	ALP	LNP	GRN	ONP	IND	OTH	ALP	LNP
3 May 2025	2025 federal election			52.8%	21.1%	12.4%	5.5%	1.4%	5.8%	69.2%	30.8%
27 Feb – 26 Mar 2025	YouGov (MRP)	10,217	—N/a	39.9%	30.5%	14.3%	9.3%	3.8%	2.2%	57.7%	42.3%
22 Jan – 12 Feb 2025	YouGov (MRP)	8,732	—N/a	38.1%	31.5%	14.2%	9.1%	5.7%	1.5%	56.2%	43.8%
29 Oct – 20 Nov 2024	Accent/RedBridge (MRP)	4,909	—N/a	40%	29%	17%	—N/a	—N/a	13%	59%	41%
10 Jul – 27 Aug 2024	Accent/RedBridge (MRP)	5,976	—N/a	42%	32%	11%	—N/a	—N/a	14%	57%	43%
21 May 2022	2022 federal election			45.9%	28.7%	14.3%	5.8%	—	5.3%	61.6%	38.4%

=== Petrie ===
Date	Firm	Sample size	Margin of error	Primary vote						2PP vote	
Date	Firm	Sample size	Margin of error	LNP	ALP	GRN	ONP	IND	OTH	LNP	ALP
3 May 2025	2025 federal election			37.9%	36.4%	11.8%	6.7%	—	7.2%	48.8%	51.2%
27 Feb – 26 Mar 2025	YouGov (MRP)	10,217	—N/a	40.7%	30%	12.3%	8.1%	4.9%	4.1%	52.7%	47.3%
22 Jan – 12 Feb 2025	YouGov (MRP)	8,732	—N/a	41.3%	28.6%	11.4%	10%	6.5%	2.1%	54.3%	45.7%
29 Oct – 20 Nov 2024	Accent/RedBridge (MRP)	4,909	—N/a	47%	33%	9%	—N/a	—N/a	11%	55%	45%
10 Jul – 27 Aug 2024	Accent/RedBridge (MRP)	5,976	—N/a	47%	31%	11%	—N/a	—N/a	11%	55%	45%
21 May 2022	2022 federal election			43.5%	30%	11.4%	5.3%	—	9.8%	54.4%	45.6%

=== Rankin ===
Date	Firm	Sample size	Margin of error	Primary vote						2PP vote	
Date	Firm	Sample size	Margin of error	ALP	LNP	GRN	ONP	IND	OTH	ALP	LNP
3 May 2025	2025 federal election			49.4%	19.8%	10.9%	6.6%	—	9.7%	65.6%	34.4%
27 Feb – 26 Mar 2025	YouGov (MRP)	10,217	—N/a	36.3%	31.3%	12.9%	12.7%	3.6%	3.2%	54.5%	45.5%
22 Jan – 12 Feb 2025	YouGov (MRP)	8,732	—N/a	37%	31.6%	12.4%	12%	5%	2.1%	54.5%	45.5%
29 Oct – 20 Nov 2024	Accent/RedBridge (MRP)	4,909	—N/a	42%	31%	16%	—N/a	—N/a	11%	59%	41%
10 Jul – 27 Aug 2024	Accent/RedBridge (MRP)	5,976	—N/a	40%	31%	9%	—N/a	—N/a	20%	55%	45%
21 May 2022	2022 federal election			44%	29%	10.7%	8%	—	8.4%	59.1%	40.9%

=== Ryan ===
Date	Firm	Sample size	Margin of error	Primary vote						2CP vote		
Date	Firm	Sample size	Margin of error	LNP	GRN	ALP	ONP	IND	OTH	GRN	LNP	ALP
3 May 2025	2025 federal election			34.6%	29.0%	28.2%	2.3%	—	5.9%	53.3%	46.7%	—
1–29 Apr 2025	YouGov (MRP)	10,822	—N/a	33.5%	32.3%	21.1%	5%	—N/a	8%	52%	48%	—N/a
Mid-Apr 2025	DemosAU	—N/a	—N/a	36%	29%	29%	—N/a	—N/a	—N/a	—N/a	—N/a	—N/a
17 Apr 2025 (released)	JWS Research	c. 800	—N/a	45%	13%	—N/a	—N/a	—N/a	—N/a	—N/a	57%	43%
3 Feb – 1 Apr 2025	Accent/RedBridge (MRP)	9,953	—N/a	39%	33%	20%	—N/a	—N/a	8%	53%	47%	—N/a
16 Mar 2025 (released)	Insightfully	600	—N/a	39.6%	27.4%	21.9%	—N/a	7.1%	3.9%	51.6%	48.3%	—N/a
27 Feb – 26 Mar 2025	YouGov (MRP)	10,217	—N/a	37%	27.1%	26.5%	3%	2.1%	4.4%	51.9%	48.1%	—N/a
22 Jan – 12 Feb 2025	YouGov (MRP)	8,732	—N/a	37.1%	26.1%	27.1%	3.9%	4.1%	1.8%	—N/a	47.6%	52.4%
29 Oct – 20 Nov 2024	Accent/RedBridge (MRP)	4,909	—N/a	37%	33%	21%	—N/a	—N/a	8%	54%	46%	—N/a
10 Jul – 27 Aug 2024	Accent/RedBridge (MRP)	5,976	—N/a	41%	27%	20%	—N/a	—N/a	12%	49%	51%	—N/a
Feb – May 2024	Accent/RedBridge (MRP)	4,040	—N/a	37%	26%	26%	—N/a	—N/a	11%	53%	47%	—N/a
21 May 2022	2022 federal election			38.5%	30.2%	22.3%	2.3%	—	6.8%	52.7%	47.4%	—

=== Wide Bay ===
Date	Firm	Sample size	Margin of error	Primary vote						2PP vote	
Date	Firm	Sample size	Margin of error	LNP	ALP	ONP	GRN	IND	OTH	LNP	ALP
3 May 2025	2025 federal election			39.1%	26.0%	12.0%	8.6%	4.9%	5.1%	57.6%	42.4%
27 Feb – 26 Mar 2025	YouGov (MRP)	10,217	—N/a	40.4%	20.4%	19.2%	9%	8.4%	2.6%	60.5%	39.5%
22 Jan – 12 Feb 2025	YouGov (MRP)	8,732	—N/a	43.8%	20.2%	13.6%	9.3%	11.2%	1.9%	60.6%	39.4%
29 Oct – 20 Nov 2024	Accent/RedBridge (MRP)	4,909	—N/a	49%	24%	—N/a	7%	—N/a	20%	63%	37%
10 Jul – 27 Aug 2024	Accent/RedBridge (MRP)	5,976	—N/a	43%	23%	—N/a	10%	—N/a	24%	60%	40%
21 May 2022	2022 federal election			43.5%	21.3%	10.2%	9.5%	7.2%	8.4%	61.3%	38.7%

=== Wright ===
Date	Firm	Sample size	Margin of error	Primary vote						2PP vote		
Date	Firm	Sample size	Margin of error	LNP	ALP	ONP	GRN	IND	OTH	LNP	ALP	ONP
3 May 2025	2025 federal election			34.1%	25.4%	16.3%	9.5%	—	14.7%	58.0%	42.0%	—
3 Feb – 1 Apr 2025	Accent/RedBridge (MRP)	9,953	—N/a	41%	22%	—N/a	8%	—N/a	29%	61%	39%	—N/a
27 Feb – 26 Mar 2025	YouGov (MRP)	10,217	—N/a	41.4%	18.3%	23.3%	10.1%	3.4%	3.5%	66.1%	—N/a	33.9%
22 Jan – 12 Feb 2025	YouGov (MRP)	8,732	—N/a	46.3%	20.7%	18%	9.6%	3.6%	1.8%	63.2%	36.8%	—N/a
29 Oct – 20 Nov 2024	Accent/RedBridge (MRP)	4,909	—N/a	46%	21%	—N/a	7%	—N/a	26%	64%	36%	—N/a
10 Jul – 27 Aug 2024	Accent/RedBridge (MRP)	5,976	—N/a	42%	19%	—N/a	11%	—N/a	28%	62%	38%	—N/a
21 May 2022	Election			43.2%	21.4%	14.3%	11.4%	—	9.8%	60.9%	39.1%	

== South Australia ==
=== Adelaide ===
Date	Firm	Sample size	Margin of error	Primary vote						2PP vote	
Date	Firm	Sample size	Margin of error	ALP	LIB	GRN	ONP	IND	OTH	ALP	LIB
3 May 2025	2025 federal election			46.5%	24.2%	19.0%	4.0%	—	6.3%	69.1%	30.9%
1–29 Apr 2025	YouGov (MRP)	10,822	—N/a	41.3%	26.6%	19.2%	5.2%	—N/a	7.7%	61.9%	38.1%
3 Feb – 1 Apr 2025	Accent/RedBridge (MRP)	9,953	—N/a	43%	29%	14%	—N/a	—N/a	14%	62%	38%
27 Feb – 26 Mar 2025	YouGov (MRP)	10,217	—N/a	38.1%	31.3%	18.3%	5.8%	4.1%	2.4%	58.1%	41.9%
22 Jan – 12 Feb 2025	YouGov (MRP)	8,732	—N/a	33.7%	32.8%	19.9%	5.7%	6.4%	1.6%	55.7%	44.3%
29 Oct – 20 Nov 2024	Accent/RedBridge (MRP)	4,909	—N/a	46%	32%	14%	—N/a	—N/a	8%	53%	47%
10 Jul – 27 Aug 2024	Accent/RedBridge (MRP)	5,976	—N/a	38%	32%	17%	—N/a	—N/a	13%	59%	41%
21 May 2022	2022 federal election			40%	32%	20.1%	3%	—	4.9%	61.9%	38.1%

=== Barker ===
Date	Firm	Sample size	Margin of error	Primary vote							2PP vote	
Date	Firm	Sample size	Margin of error	LIB	ALP	GRN	ONP	IND	NAT	OTH	LIB	ALP
3 May 2025	2025 federal election			48.3%	22.5%	8.2%	8.2%	5.8%	1.7%	5.3%	63.0%	37.0%
1–29 Apr 2025	YouGov (MRP)	10,822	—N/a	44.8%	21.4%	7.8%	11.5%	8.2%	—N/a	6.3%	60.7%	39.3%
3 Feb – 1 Apr 2025	Accent/RedBridge (MRP)	9,953	—N/a	50%	16%	8%	—N/a	—N/a	—N/a	26%	67%	33%
27 Feb – 26 Mar 2025	YouGov (MRP)	10,217	—N/a	47.3%	22.6%	7.2%	13.5%	8.4%	—N/a	1.1%	61.7%	38.3%
22 Jan – 12 Feb 2025	YouGov (MRP)	8,732	—N/a	49.5%	19.3%	8%	11.9%	9.9%	—N/a	1.4%	64.1%	35.9%
29 Oct – 20 Nov 2024	Accent/RedBridge (MRP)	4,909	—N/a	47%	15%	5%	—N/a	—N/a	—N/a	33%	68%	32%
10 Jul – 27 Aug 2024	Accent/RedBridge (MRP)	5,976	—N/a	50%	16%	10%	—N/a	—N/a	—N/a	23%	67%	33%
21 May 2022	2022 federal election			53.2%	20.9%	7.4%	6.6%	4.8%	2.4%	4.7%	66.6%	33.4%

=== Boothby ===
Date	Firm	Sample size	Margin of error	Primary vote						2PP vote	
Date	Firm	Sample size	Margin of error	LIB	ALP	GRN	IND	ONP	OTH	ALP	LIB
3 May 2025	2025 federal election			42.6%	32.5%	17.1%	—	3.0%	4.8%	61.1%	38.9%
1–29 Apr 2025	YouGov (MRP)	10,822	—N/a	35%	32.8%	15.2%	—N/a	6%	11%	51.9%	48.1%
3 Feb – 1 Apr 2025	Accent/RedBridge (MRP)	9,953	—N/a	38%	38%	14%	—N/a	—N/a	10%	55%	45%
27 Feb – 26 Mar 2025	YouGov (MRP)	10,217	—N/a	36.1%	31.9%	15.8%	10%	4.5%	1.7%	52.7%	47.3%
22 Jan – 12 Feb 2025	YouGov (MRP)	8,732	—N/a	38%	28.9%	13.2%	13.2%	5.6%	1.2%	50.6%	49.4%
29 Oct – 20 Nov 2024	Accent/RedBridge (MRP)	4,909	—N/a	41%	37%	14%	—N/a	—N/a	8%	53%	47%
10 Jul – 27 Aug 2024	Accent/RedBridge (MRP)	5,976	—N/a	39%	36%	17%	—N/a	—N/a	7%	55%	45%
21 May 2022	2022 federal election			38%	32.3%	15.2%	7.5%	2%	5%	53.3%	46.7%

=== Grey ===
Date	Firm	Sample size	Margin of error	Primary vote						2PP vote	
Date	Firm	Sample size	Margin of error	LIB	ALP	IND	GRN	ONP	OTH	LIB	ALP
3 May 2025	2025 federal election			34.9%	22.5%	17.5%	5.9%	10.0%	9.2%	54.6%	45.4%
1–29 Apr 2025	YouGov (MRP)	10,822	—N/a	37.5%	17.7%	15.4%	9.4%	12.2%	7.8%	57.2%	42.8%
3 Feb – 1 Apr 2025	Accent/RedBridge (MRP)	9,953	—N/a	46%	22%	—N/a	8%	—N/a	24%	60%	40%
27 Feb – 26 Mar 2025	YouGov (MRP)	10,217	—N/a	42.1%	22%	12.6%	7.7%	13.4%	2.2%	58.9%	41.1%
22 Jan – 12 Feb 2025	YouGov (MRP)	8,732	—N/a	42.9%	19.1%	15.1%	9.4%	10.6%	2.9%	59.6%	40.4%
29 Oct – 20 Nov 2024	Accent/RedBridge (MRP)	4,909	—N/a	46%	20%	—N/a	8%	—N/a	26%	61%	39%
10 Jul – 27 Aug 2024	Accent/RedBridge (MRP)	5,976	—N/a	44%	23%	—N/a	8%	—N/a	25%	59%	41%
21 May 2022	2022 federal election			45.3%	21.4%	12.5%	6.8%	6.3%	7.7%	60.1%	39.9%

=== Hindmarsh ===
Date	Firm	Sample size	Margin of error	Primary vote						2PP vote	
Date	Firm	Sample size	Margin of error	ALP	LIB	GRN	ONP	IND	OTH	ALP	LIB
3 May 2025	2025 federal election			48.1%	23.1%	13.6%	5.0%	1.6%	8.6%	66.3%	33.7%
1–29 Apr 2025	YouGov (MRP)	10,822	—N/a	41%	27.3%	15.1%	7.1%	3.7%	5.9%	60.4%	39.6%
3 Feb – 1 Apr 2025	Accent/RedBridge (MRP)	9,953	—N/a	41%	34%	14%	—N/a	—N/a	11%	58%	42%
27 Feb – 26 Mar 2025	YouGov (MRP)	10,217	—N/a	35.5%	34%	13.9%	8.4%	5.4%	2.8%	53.9%	46.1%
22 Jan – 12 Feb 2025	YouGov (MRP)	8,732	—N/a	34.3%	35.6%	13.2%	7.7%	7%	2.3%	52.4%	47.6%
29 Oct – 20 Nov 2024	Accent/RedBridge (MRP)	4,909	—N/a	39%	37%	14%	—N/a	—N/a	10%	53%	47%
10 Jul – 27 Aug 2024	Accent/RedBridge (MRP)	5,976	—N/a	41%	37%	10%	—N/a	—N/a	12%	55%	45%
21 May 2022	2022 federal election			42.2%	32.7%	13.9%	3.9%	—	7.3%	59%	41.1%

=== Kingston ===
Date	Firm	Sample size	Margin of error	Primary vote						2PP vote	
Date	Firm	Sample size	Margin of error	ALP	LIB	GRN	ONP	IND	OTH	ALP	LIB
3 May 2025	2025 federal election			53.0%	18.6%	13.5%	6.2%	—	8.7%	70.7%	29.3%
1–29 Apr 2025	YouGov (MRP)	10,822	—N/a	47.5%	22.6%	13%	10.7%	—N/a	6.2%	64.2%	35.8%
3 Feb – 1 Apr 2025	Accent/RedBridge (MRP)	9,953	—N/a	44%	28%	12%	—N/a	—N/a	16%	63%	37%
27 Feb – 26 Mar 2025	YouGov (MRP)	10,217	—N/a	40.4%	28.1%	13%	9.8%	6.7%	2.1%	58.9%	41.1%
22 Jan – 12 Feb 2025	YouGov (MRP)	8,732	—N/a	36.8%	28.8%	13%	10.4%	9.1%	2%	56.7%	43.3%
29 Oct – 20 Nov 2024	Accent/RedBridge (MRP)	4,909	—N/a	44%	33%	12%	—N/a	—N/a	11%	60%	40%
10 Jul – 27 Aug 2024	Accent/RedBridge (MRP)	5,976	—N/a	44%	29%	12%	—N/a	—N/a	15%	62%	38%
21 May 2022	2022 federal election			49.2%	25.9%	12.4%	4.9%	2.71%	4.9%	66.4%	33.7%

=== Makin ===
Date	Firm	Sample size	Margin of error	Primary vote						2PP vote	
Date	Firm	Sample size	Margin of error	ALP	LIB	GRN	ONP	IND	OTH	ALP	LIB
3 May 2025	2025 federal election			47.8%	22.5%	12.4%	6.7%	—	10.6%	64.7%	35.3%
1–29 Apr 2025	YouGov (MRP)	10,822	—N/a	44.4%	25.6%	13.2%	8.8%	—N/a	7.9%	61.5%	38.5%
3 Feb – 1 Apr 2025	Accent/RedBridge (MRP)	9,953	—N/a	42%	34%	11%	—N/a	—N/a	14%	57%	43%
27 Feb – 26 Mar 2025	YouGov (MRP)	10,217	—N/a	39%	33.1%	12%	9.3%	3.7%	3%	55.3%	44.7%
22 Jan – 12 Feb 2025	YouGov (MRP)	8,732	—N/a	36.1%	33.8%	11.4%	9.5%	7.1%	2%	53.4%	46.6%
29 Oct – 20 Nov 2024	Accent/RedBridge (MRP)	4,909	—N/a	42%	33%	10%	—N/a	—N/a	15%	57%	43%
10 Jul – 27 Aug 2024	Accent/RedBridge (MRP)	5,976	—N/a	39%	34%	15%	—N/a	—N/a	12%	57%	43%
21 May 2022	2022 federal election			46.3%	31.4%	11.4%	4.7%	—	6.1%	60.8%	39.2%

=== Mayo ===
Date	Firm	Sample size	Margin of error	Primary vote						2CP vote	
Date	Firm	Sample size	Margin of error	OTH	LIB	ALP	GRN	ONP	IND	CA	LIB
3 May 2025	2025 federal election			35.4%	23.6%	21.4%	13.6%	6.0%	—	64.9%	35.1%
1–29 Apr 2025	YouGov (MRP)	10,822	—N/a	44.2%	21.9%	15%	11.4%	7.5%	—N/a	69.7%	30.3%
3 Feb – 1 Apr 2025	Accent/RedBridge (MRP)	9,953	—N/a	37%	35%	19%	9%	—N/a	—N/a	55%	45%
27 Feb – 26 Mar 2025	YouGov (MRP)	10,217	—N/a	36.5%	28.8%	16.3%	12.7%	3.5%	2.1%	62.1%	37.9%
22 Jan – 12 Feb 2025	YouGov (MRP)	8,732	—N/a	31.5%	30.5%	17.2%	11.7%	7.2%	1.9%	53.4%	46.6%
29 Oct – 20 Nov 2024	Accent/RedBridge (MRP)	4,909	—N/a	42%	29%	20%	9%	—N/a	—N/a	59%	41%
10 Jul – 27 Aug 2024	Accent/RedBridge (MRP)	5,976	—N/a	37%	35%	20%	9%	—N/a	—N/a	59%	41%
Feb – May 2024	Accent/RedBridge (MRP)	4,040	—N/a	31%	29%	23%	17%	—N/a	—N/a	60%	40%
21 May 2022	2022 federal election			39.4%	27%	18.1%	11.8%	4.1%	—	62.3%	37.7%

=== Spence ===
Date	Firm	Sample size	Margin of error	Primary vote						2PP vote	
Date	Firm	Sample size	Margin of error	ALP	LIB	GRN	ONP	IND	OTH	ALP	LIB
3 May 2025	2025 federal election			44.3%	18.7%	14.5%	9.5%	2.5%	10.5%	65.3%	34.7%
1–29 Apr 2025	YouGov (MRP)	10,822	—N/a	38.5%	21.1%	11.9%	16%	5.8%	6.6%	59.9%	40.1%
3 Feb – 1 Apr 2025	Accent/RedBridge (MRP)	9,953	—N/a	37%	22%	12%	—N/a	—N/a	29%	62%	38%
27 Feb – 26 Mar 2025	YouGov (MRP)	10,217	—N/a	38%	28.6%	12.5%	15.5%	3%	2.4%	56.1%	43.9%
22 Jan – 12 Feb 2025	YouGov (MRP)	8,732	—N/a	36.6%	28.4%	12.3%	16.4%	4.5%	1.8%	55.1%	44.9%
29 Oct – 20 Nov 2024	Accent/RedBridge (MRP)	4,909	—N/a	36%	29%	16%	—N/a	—N/a	19%	59%	41%
10 Jul – 27 Aug 2024	Accent/RedBridge (MRP)	5,976	—N/a	35%	26%	12%	—N/a	—N/a	28%	58%	42%
21 May 2022	2022 federal election			43.9%	25.6%	11.4%	10.9%	—	8.4%	62.9%	37.1%

=== Sturt ===
Date	Firm	Sample size	Margin of error	Primary vote						2PP vote	
Date	Firm	Sample size	Margin of error	LIB	ALP	GRN	ONP	IND	OTH	LIB	ALP
3 May 2025	2025 federal election			34.3%	35.3%	15.6%	3.4%	7.2%	4.2%	43.4%	56.6%
1–29 Apr 2025	YouGov (MRP)	10,822	—N/a	37.7%	31.9%	14%	5.7%	4.8%	5.9%	49.3%	50.7%
3 Feb – 1 Apr 2025	Accent/RedBridge (MRP)	9,953	—N/a	39%	39%	12%	—N/a	—N/a	10%	45%	55%
27 Feb – 26 Mar 2025	YouGov (MRP)	10,217	—N/a	40.3%	29.5%	15.2%	6.4%	5.5%	3.1%	51.5%	48.5%
22 Jan – 12 Feb 2025	YouGov (MRP)	8,732	—N/a	42.7%	28.6%	14.7%	5.2%	7.2%	1.6%	59.6%	40.4%
Between Mar – Dec 2024	Climate 200	—N/a	—N/a	36%	—N/a	—N/a	—N/a	—N/a	—N/a	—N/a	—N/a
29 Oct – 20 Nov 2024	Accent/RedBridge (MRP)	4,909	—N/a	42%	33%	14%	—N/a	—N/a	11%	50%	50%
10 Jul – 27 Aug 2024	Accent/RedBridge (MRP)	5,976	—N/a	41%	30%	11%	—N/a	—N/a	18%	52%	48%
21 May 2022	2022 federal election			43.1%	30.7%	16.4%	2.6%	—	7.2%	50.5%	49.6%

== Tasmania ==
=== Bass ===
Date	Firm	Sample size	Margin of error	Primary vote						2PP vote	
Date	Firm	Sample size	Margin of error	LIB	ALP	GRN	IND	ONP	OTH	LIB	ALP
3 May 2025	2025 federal election			31.4%	39.6%	12.9%	5.4%	6.5%	4.2%	42.0%	58.0%
1–29 Apr 2025	YouGov (MRP)	10,822	—N/a	32.6%	25.2%	10.7%	10.3%	14.8%	6.5%	52.2%	47.8%
3 Feb – 1 Apr 2025	Accent/RedBridge (MRP)	9,953	—N/a	33%	30%	11%	—N/a	—N/a	25%	47%	53%
27 Feb – 26 Mar 2025	YouGov (MRP)	10,217	—N/a	36.2%	26.6%	13.3%	11%	9.9%	3.1%	51.6%	48.4%
22 Jan – 12 Feb 2025	YouGov (MRP)	8,732	—N/a	36.8%	27.8%	12.3%	9.9%	11.2%	11.9%	52.1%	47.9%
29 Oct – 20 Nov 2024	Accent/RedBridge (MRP)	4,909	—N/a	44%	27%	12%	—N/a	—N/a	17%	54%	46%
10 Jul – 27 Aug 2024	Accent/RedBridge (MRP)	5,976	—N/a	40%	25%	13%	—N/a	—N/a	22%	52%	48%
21 May 2022	2022 federal election			39.7%	28.6%	11.1%	5%	4.7%	10.8%	51.4%	48.6%

=== Braddon ===
Date	Firm	Sample size	Margin of error	Primary vote						2PP vote	
Date	Firm	Sample size	Margin of error	LIB	ALP	IND	GRN	ONP	OTH	LIB	ALP
3 May 2025	2025 federal election			31.7%	39.5%	8.3%	8.4%	7.6%	4.5%	42.8%	57.2%
1–29 Apr 2025	YouGov (MRP)	10,822	—N/a	30.5%	33%	16.9%	9.5%	5%	5.1%	57%	43%
17–24 Apr 2025	YouGov	419	±6%	30.6%	33.2%	15.7%	9.7%	4.6%	6.2% (Note: 3.2% for Trumpet of Patriots and 3% for all others.)	—N/a	—N/a
3 Feb – 1 Apr 2025	Accent/RedBridge (MRP)	9,953	—N/a	42%	26%	—N/a	10%	—N/a	22%	54%	46%
27 Feb – 26 Mar 2025	YouGov (MRP)	10,217	—N/a	40.7%	25.3%	10.5%	9.3%	9.7%	4.5%	55.7%	44.3%
22 Jan – 12 Feb 2025	YouGov (MRP)	8,732	—N/a	41.6%	22.1%	12.9%	8.9%	11.1%	16.3%	58.1%	41.9%
29 Oct – 20 Nov 2024	Accent/RedBridge (MRP)	4,909	—N/a	46%	22%	—N/a	7%	—N/a	25%	59%	41%
10 Jul – 27 Aug 2024	Accent/RedBridge (MRP)	5,976	—N/a	43%	21%	—N/a	10%	—N/a	25%	57%	43%
21 May 2022	2022 federal election			44.1%	22.5%	7.8%	6.7%	4.3%	14.5%	58%	42%

=== Clark ===
Date	Firm	Sample size	Margin of error	Primary vote						2CP vote	
Date	Firm	Sample size	Margin of error	IND	ALP	LIB	GRN	ONP	OTH	IND	ALP
3 May 2025	2025 federal election			48.9%	20.0%	13.7%	13.2%	4.2%	—	70.4%	29.6%
1–29 Apr 2025	YouGov (MRP)	10,822	—N/a	55.5%	18.7%	13.6%	8.7%	3.5%	—N/a	71.9%	28.1%
3 Feb – 1 Apr 2025	Accent/RedBridge (MRP)	9,953	—N/a	—N/a	23%	14%	11%	—N/a	51%	67%	33%
27 Feb – 26 Mar 2025	YouGov (MRP)	10,217	—N/a	43.5%	21.2%	16.5%	14.4%	4%	0.3%	64.8%	35.2%
22 Jan – 12 Feb 2025	YouGov (MRP)	8,732	—N/a	40.1%	22.8%	17.9%	15.4%	3.3%	0.4%	56%	44%
29 Oct – 20 Nov 2024	Accent/RedBridge (MRP)	4,909	—N/a	—N/a	27%	10%	13%	—N/a	51%	68%	32%
10 Jul – 27 Aug 2024	Accent/RedBridge (MRP)	5,976	—N/a	—N/a	18%	22%	13%	—N/a	47%	72%	28%
21 May 2022	2022 federal election			45.5%	18.8%	15.9%	13.5%	2.6%	3.8%	70.8%	29.2%

=== Franklin ===
Date	Firm	Sample size	Margin of error	Primary vote						2CP vote		
Date	Firm	Sample size	Margin of error	ALP	LIB	GRN	ONP	IND	OTH	ALP	LIB	IND
3 May 2025	2025 federal election			39.0%	18.8%	10.5%	5.0%	26.7%	—	57.8%	—	42.2%
1–29 Apr 2025	YouGov (MRP)	10,822	—N/a	31.9%	25.5%	16.8%	6.9%	18.9%	—N/a	58.6%	41.4%	—N/a
16 Apr 2025	Greens candidate Owen Fitzgerald withdraws after discovering dual citizenship											
9–10 Apr 2025	EMRS	430	±4.71%	38%	19%	13%	—N/a	20% (Note: 13% for Peter George, 7% for Brendan Blomeley, and 6% for "some other minor party".)	—N/a	—N/a	—N/a	—N/a
3 Feb – 1 Apr 2025	Accent/RedBridge (MRP)	9,953	—N/a	42%	28%	13%	—N/a	—N/a	17%	64%	36%	—N/a
27 Feb – 26 Mar 2025	YouGov (MRP)	10,217	—N/a	33.6%	29.2%	18.1%	6%	6.5%	6.7%	57.1%	42.9%	—N/a
22 Jan – 12 Feb 2025	YouGov (MRP)	8,732	—N/a	36.1%	30.7%	14.5%	8.2%	6.4%	4.1%	56%	44%	—N/a
29 Oct – 20 Nov 2024	Accent/RedBridge (MRP)	4,909	—N/a	41%	31%	18%	—N/a	—N/a	9%	63%	37%	—N/a
10 Jul – 27 Aug 2024	Accent/RedBridge (MRP)	5,976	—N/a	36%	29%	13%	—N/a	—N/a	22%	61%	39%	—N/a
21 May 2022	2022 federal election			36.7%	26.7%	17.4%	2.9%	—	16.4%	63.7%	36.3%	—

=== Lyons ===
Date	Firm	Sample size	Margin of error	Primary vote						2PP vote	
Date	Firm	Sample size	Margin of error	LIB	ALP	GRN	ONP	IND	OTH	ALP	LIB
3 May 2025	2025 federal election			26.2%	43.1%	10.9%	6.7%	3.2%	5.2%	61.6%	38.4%
1–29 Apr 2025	YouGov (MRP)	10,822	—N/a	27.8%	33.4%	13%	4.4%	9.3%	12.1%	47.7%	52.3%
17–24 Apr 2025	YouGov	446	±6%	27.8%	33.4%	13.0%	4.4%	9.3%	12.1% (Note: 1.8% for Trumpet of Patriots and 10.3% for all others.)	56%	44%
10 Apr 2025 (released)	uComms	712	—N/a	29.5%	27.2%	14.6%	4.1%	—N/a	5.8% (Note: 5.8% for the Jacqui Lambie Network.)	50.9%	49.1%
3 Feb – 1 Apr 2025	Accent/RedBridge (MRP)	9,953	—N/a	37%	31%	11%	—N/a	—N/a	21%	52%	48%
27 Feb – 26 Mar 2025	YouGov (MRP)	10,217	—N/a	37.7%	28%	11.7%	10%	6.8%	5.9%	47.5%	52.5%
22 Jan – 12 Feb 2025	YouGov (MRP)	8,732	—N/a	38.1%	26.5%	10.8%	12.5%	6.8%	5.3%	45.6%	54.4%
18–20 Dec 2024	Pyxis	400	±4.9%	—N/a	—N/a	—N/a	—N/a	—N/a	—N/a	—N/a	—N/a
29 Oct – 20 Nov 2024	Accent/RedBridge (MRP)	4,909	—N/a	42%	26%	9%	—N/a	—N/a	24%	46%	54%
10 Jul – 27 Aug 2024	Accent/RedBridge (MRP)	5,976	—N/a	41%	25%	9%	—N/a	—N/a	24%	46%	54%
Feb – May 2024	Accent/RedBridge (MRP)	4,040	—N/a	37%	28%	13%	—N/a	—N/a	23%	50%	50%
21 May 2022	2022 federal election			37.2%	29%	11.4%	5.4%	—	17%	50.9%	49.1%

== Victoria ==
=== Aston ===
Date	Firm	Sample size	Margin of error	Primary vote						2PP vote	
Date	Firm	Sample size	Margin of error	LIB	ALP	GRN	ONP	IND	OTH	LIB	ALP
3 May 2025	2025 federal election			37.7%	37.3%	11.5%	3.4%	4.1%	6.0%	46.6%	53.4%
1–29 Apr 2025	YouGov (MRP)	10,822	—N/a	39.6%	29.8%	11.4%	6.5%	6.8%	5.8%	52%	48%
3 Feb – 1 Apr 2025	Accent/RedBridge (MRP)	9,953	—N/a	42%	32%	13%	—N/a	—N/a	12%	52%	48%
27 Feb – 26 Mar 2025	YouGov (MRP)	10,217	—N/a	40.7%	28.2%	13.8%	6.2%	6.5%	4.6%	52.7%	47.3%
22 Jan – 12 Feb 2025	YouGov (MRP)	8,732	—N/a	42.5%	29%	12.8%	7%	6.8%	1.9%	53.7%	46.3%
29 Oct – 20 Nov 2024	Accent/RedBridge (MRP)	4,909	—N/a	47%	33%	11%	—N/a	—N/a	9%	54%	46%
10 Jul – 27 Aug 2024	Accent/RedBridge (MRP)	5,976	—N/a	47%	30%	11%	—N/a	—N/a	11%	56%	44%
1 Apr 2023	2023 by-election			39.1%	40.9%	10.1%	—	7.0%	2.9%	46.4%	53.6%
21 May 2022	2022 federal election			43.1%	32.6%	12.1%	3.1%	—	9.2%	52.8%	47.2%

=== Ballarat ===
Date	Firm	Sample size	Margin of error	Primary vote						2PP vote	
Date	Firm	Sample size	Margin of error	ALP	LIB	GRN	ONP	IND	OTH	ALP	LIB
3 May 2025	2025 federal election			42.4%	28.6%	14.3%	7.7%	2.8%	4.2%	60.7%	39.3%
1–29 Apr 2025	YouGov (MRP)	10,822	—N/a	43.2%	26%	13.2%	8.4%	5.2%	3.9%	61.6%	38.4%
3 Feb – 1 Apr 2025	Accent/RedBridge (MRP)	9,953	—N/a	38%	36%	12%	—N/a	—N/a	14%	54%	46%
17–24 Apr 2025	YouGov	217	±6%	38.5%	23.8%	17.7%	9.8%	6.1%	4.1%	62%	38%
27 Feb – 26 Mar 2025	YouGov (MRP)	10,217	—N/a	38.4%	28.2%	14.6%	9.9%	6.4%	2.6%	58.3%	41.7%
22 Jan – 12 Feb 2025	YouGov (MRP)	8,732	—N/a	35%	29.2%	15.5%	9.3%	8.2%	2.8%	56.4%	43.6%
29 Oct – 20 Nov 2024	Accent/RedBridge (MRP)	4,909	—N/a	44%	35%	7%	—N/a	—N/a	13%	56%	44%
10 Jul – 27 Aug 2024	Accent/RedBridge (MRP)	5,976	—N/a	37%	33%	17%	—N/a	—N/a	12%	57%	43%
21 May 2022	2022 federal election			44.7%	27.1%	14.6%	3.6%	2.1%	7.9%	63%	37%

=== Bendigo ===
Date	Firm	Sample size	Margin of error	Primary vote						2PP vote		
Date	Firm	Sample size	Margin of error	ALP	LIB	GRN	ONP	IND	OTH	ALP	LIB	NAT
3 May 2025	2025 federal election			33.6%	10.5%	11.3%	4.9%	1.1%	38.6%	51.4%	—	49.6%
1–29 Apr 2025	YouGov (MRP)	10,822	—N/a	39.8%	24.5%	14.8%	9.5%	5.8%	5.6%	60.9%	39.1%	—N/a
3 Feb – 1 Apr 2025	Accent/RedBridge (MRP)	9,953	—N/a	38%	30%	12%	—N/a	—N/a	20%	56%	44%	—N/a
27 Feb – 26 Mar 2025	YouGov (MRP)	10,217	—N/a	36.5%	28.5%	13.5%	10.1%	9.5%	2%	57.1%	42.9%	—N/a
22 Jan – 12 Feb 2025	YouGov (MRP)	8,732	—N/a	34.3%	30.1%	13.2%	10.5%	9.3%	2.6%	54.8%	45.2%	—N/a
29 Oct – 20 Nov 2024	Accent/RedBridge (MRP)	4,909	—N/a	40%	34%	12%	—N/a	—N/a	14%	57%	43%	—N/a
10 Jul – 27 Aug 2024	Accent/RedBridge (MRP)	5,976	—N/a	37%	33%	12%	—N/a	—N/a	18%	55%	45%	—N/a
21 May 2022	2022 federal election			43%	26.6%	14.1%	5.5%	4.3%	6.5%	62.1%	37.9%	—

=== Bruce ===
Date	Firm	Sample size	Margin of error	Primary vote						2PP vote	
Date	Firm	Sample size	Margin of error	ALP	LIB	GRN	ONP	IND	OTH	ALP	LIB
3 May 2025	2025 federal election			45.3%	23.0%	12.1%	8.2%	—	12.4%	64.6%	35.4%
1–29 Apr 2025	YouGov (MRP)	10,822	—N/a	37.9%	29.6%	11.1%	10.6%	—N/a	10.8%	55.2%	44.8%
3 Feb – 1 Apr 2025	Accent/RedBridge (MRP)	9,953	—N/a	37%	41%	11%	—N/a	—N/a	11%	51%	49%
27 Feb – 26 Mar 2025	YouGov (MRP)	10,217	—N/a	34.1%	34.5%	12.8%	9%	4.3%	5.4%	52.4%	47.6%
22 Jan – 12 Feb 2025	YouGov (MRP)	8,732	—N/a	34.1%	35.2%	11.9%	8.9%	5.4%	4.6%	51.7%	48.3%
29 Oct – 20 Nov 2024	Accent/RedBridge (MRP)	4,909	—N/a	39%	38%	10%	—N/a	—N/a	12%	52%	48%
10 Jul – 27 Aug 2024	Accent/RedBridge (MRP)	5,976	—N/a	38%	38%	10%	—N/a	—N/a	14%	51%	49%
21 May 2022	2022 federal election			41.5%	30.3%	9.7%	4.8%	—	13.8%	56.6%	43.4%

=== Calwell ===
Date	Firm	Sample size	Margin of error	Primary vote						2CP vote		
Date	Firm	Sample size	Margin of error	ALP	LIB	GRN	ONP	IND	OTH	ALP	LIB	IND
3 May 2025	2025 federal election			30.5%	15.7%	8.3%	3.8%	35.9%	5.8%	55.1%	—	44.9%
1–29 Apr 2025	YouGov (MRP)	10,822	—N/a	37.2%	22.1%	12%	12%	2.5%	14.2%	58.5%	41.5%	—N/a
3 Feb – 1 Apr 2025	Accent/RedBridge (MRP)	9,953	—N/a	38%	29%	11%	—N/a	—N/a	21%	57%	43%	—N/a
27 Feb – 26 Mar 2025	YouGov (MRP)	10,217	—N/a	34.6%	28.6%	14.5%	12.6%	3.7%	6%	55.4%	44.6%	—N/a
22 Jan – 12 Feb 2025	YouGov (MRP)	8,732	—N/a	37.7%	27.2%	15.1%	11.2%	3.8%	5.1%	57.9%	42.1%	—N/a
29 Oct – 20 Nov 2024	Accent/RedBridge (MRP)	4,909	—N/a	40%	31%	12%	—N/a	—N/a	17%	57%	43%	—N/a
10 Jul – 27 Aug 2024	Accent/RedBridge (MRP)	5,976	—N/a	37%	28%	16%	—N/a	—N/a	19%	58%	42%	—N/a
21 May 2022	2022 federal election			44.9%	23.7%	9.7%	7%	—	14.7%	62.4%	37.6%	—

=== Casey ===
Date	Firm	Sample size	Margin of error	Primary vote						2PP vote	
Date	Firm	Sample size	Margin of error	LIB	ALP	GRN	IND	ONP	OTH	LIB	ALP
3 May 2025	2025 federal election			40.9%	24.3%	10.9%	10.5%	5.1%	8.3%	52.9%	47.1%
1–29 Apr 2025	YouGov (MRP)	10,822	—N/a	35.3%	22%	14%	12%	8.1%	8.6%	52.7%	47.3%
3 Feb – 1 Apr 2025	Accent/RedBridge (MRP)	9,953	—N/a	37%	29%	10%	—N/a	—N/a	24%	51%	49%
27 Feb – 26 Mar 2025	YouGov (MRP)	10,217	—N/a	35.2%	22%	13.7%	15.5%	9.1%	4.6%	52.6%	47.4%
22 Jan – 12 Feb 2025	YouGov (MRP)	8,732	—N/a	39.2%	22.7%	14.9%	12.5%	7.6%	3.2%	54.2%	45.8%
Between Mar – Dec 2024	Climate 200	—N/a	—N/a	38%	—N/a	—N/a	—N/a	—N/a	—N/a	—N/a	—N/a
29 Oct – 20 Nov 2024	Accent/RedBridge (MRP)	4,909	—N/a	39%	28%	14%	—N/a	—N/a	19%	51%	49%
10 Jul – 27 Aug 2024	Accent/RedBridge (MRP)	5,976	—N/a	38%	28%	16%	—N/a	—N/a	18%	49%	51%
21 May 2022	2022 federal election			36.5%	24.9%	12.9%	8.3%	3.3%	14.1%	51.5%	48.5%

=== Chisholm ===
Date	Firm	Sample size	Margin of error	Primary vote						2PP vote	
Date	Firm	Sample size	Margin of error	ALP	LIB	GRN	IND	ONP	OTH	ALP	LIB
3 May 2025	2025 federal election			38.7%	37.3%	12.5%	5.9%	1.9%	3.7%	55.7%	44.3%
1–29 Apr 2025	YouGov (MRP)	10,822	—N/a	32.6%	35%	16.4%	4.8%	5.6%	5.6%	53.1%	46.9%
3 Feb – 1 Apr 2025	Accent/RedBridge (MRP)	9,953	—N/a	32%	47%	12%	—N/a	—N/a	9%	47%	53%
27 Feb – 26 Mar 2025	YouGov (MRP)	10,217	—N/a	30.9%	38.3%	14.8%	8.7%	4.1%	3.2%	50.7%	49.3%
22 Jan – 12 Feb 2025	YouGov (MRP)	8,732	—N/a	29.9%	41.8%	13.4%	8.8%	4%	2.1%	48%	52%
29 Oct – 20 Nov 2024	Accent/RedBridge (MRP)	4,909	—N/a	33%	41%	13%	—N/a	—N/a	12%	50%	50%
10 Jul – 27 Aug 2024	Accent/RedBridge (MRP)	5,976	—N/a	36%	43%	9%	—N/a	—N/a	12%	49%	51%
21 May 2022	2022 federal election			40.1%	36.3%	12.6%	2.4%	1.4%	7.2%	56.4%	43.6%

=== Cooper ===
Date	Firm	Sample size	Margin of error	Primary vote						2PP vote	
Date	Firm	Sample size	Margin of error	ALP	GRN	LIB	ONP	IND	OTH	ALP	GRN
3 May 2025	2025 federal election			42.0%	25.2%	15.1%	5.3%	—	12.4%	59.7%	40.3%
1–29 Apr 2025	YouGov (MRP)	10,822	—N/a	41.4%	26%	18%	6.1%	—N/a	8.5%	60.2%	39.8%
3 Feb – 1 Apr 2025	Accent/RedBridge (MRP)	9,953	—N/a	45%	21%	20%	—N/a	—N/a	14%	65%	35%
27 Feb – 26 Mar 2025	YouGov (MRP)	10,217	—N/a	34.4%	27.7%	20.8%	5.8%	5.9%	5.5%	56%	44%
22 Jan – 12 Feb 2025	YouGov (MRP)	8,732	—N/a	39.2%	26.9%	21.8%	4.8%	4.6%	2.7%	57.7%	42.3%
29 Oct – 20 Nov 2024	Accent/RedBridge (MRP)	4,909	—N/a	43%	25%	23%	—N/a	—N/a	9%	62%	38%
10 Jul – 27 Aug 2024	Accent/RedBridge (MRP)	5,976	—N/a	40%	29%	20%	—N/a	—N/a	11%	58%	42%
21 May 2022	2022 federal election			41.3%	27.4%	16.4%	3%	—	12%	58.7%	41.3%

=== Corangamite ===
Date	Firm	Sample size	Margin of error	Primary vote						2PP vote	
Date	Firm	Sample size	Margin of error	ALP	LIB	GRN	ONP	IND	OTH	ALP	LIB
3 May 2025	2025 federal election			37.3%	34.1%	14.4%	3.2%	4.4%	6.6%	58.0%	42.0%
1–29 Apr 2025	YouGov (MRP)	10,822	—N/a	38.1%	30.2%	14.3%	5.9%	5%	6.5%	57.5%	42.5%
3 Feb – 1 Apr 2025	Accent/RedBridge (MRP)	9,953	—N/a	35%	40%	14%	—N/a	—N/a	11%	53%	47%
27 Feb – 26 Mar 2025	YouGov (MRP)	10,217	—N/a	35.5%	34%	15.9%	6%	5.3%	3.3%	54.9%	45.1%
22 Jan – 12 Feb 2025	YouGov (MRP)	8,732	—N/a	34.2%	35.7%	13.4%	7.5%	6.6%	2.6%	52.4%	47.6%
29 Oct – 20 Nov 2024	Accent/RedBridge (MRP)	4,909	—N/a	34%	38%	10%	—N/a	—N/a	18%	51%	49%
10 Jul – 27 Aug 2024	Accent/RedBridge (MRP)	5,976	—N/a	33%	38%	15%	—N/a	—N/a	14%	53%	47%
21 May 2022	2022 federal election			38.2%	34.1%	15.2%	2.5%	—	9.9%	57.6%	42.4%

=== Corio ===
Date	Firm	Sample size	Margin of error	Primary vote						2PP vote	
Date	Firm	Sample size	Margin of error	ALP	LIB	GRN	ONP	IND	OTH	ALP	LIB
3 May 2025	2025 federal election			42.8%	24.9%	15.9%	9.9%	3.6%	2.9%	63.2%	36.8%
1–29 Apr 2025	YouGov (MRP)	10,822	—N/a	38.2%	25.4%	17.8%	9.7%	3.2%	5.7%	60.2%	39.8%
3 Feb – 1 Apr 2025	Accent/RedBridge (MRP)	9,953	—N/a	42%	26%	14%	—N/a	—N/a	17%	62%	38%
27 Feb – 26 Mar 2025	YouGov (MRP)	10,217	—N/a	35.1%	28.2%	16%	7.5%	7.6%	5.7%	57.5%	42.5%
22 Jan – 12 Feb 2025	YouGov (MRP)	8,732	—N/a	36.9%	29.2%	14.5%	9.2%	6.2%	4.1%	56.9%	43.1%
29 Oct – 20 Nov 2024	Accent/RedBridge (MRP)	4,909	—N/a	43%	23%	25%	—N/a	—N/a	9%	57%	43%
10 Jul – 27 Aug 2024	Accent/RedBridge (MRP)	5,976	—N/a	40%	29%	9%	—N/a	—N/a	22%	58%	42%
21 May 2022	2022 federal election			42.1%	24.6%	14.9%	3.9%	—	14.5%	62.8%	37.2%

=== Deakin ===
Date	Firm	Sample size	Margin of error	Primary vote						2PP vote	
Date	Firm	Sample size	Margin of error	LIB	ALP	GRN	ONP	IND	OTH	LIB	ALP
3 May 2025	2025 federal election			38.7%	34.8%	11.9%	2.6%	7.2%	4.8%	47.2%	52.8%
1–29 Apr 2025	YouGov (MRP)	10,822	—N/a	37.9%	32.5%	11.5%	5.3%	8.9%	3.9%	49.3%	50.7%
3 Feb – 1 Apr 2025	Accent/RedBridge (MRP)	9,953	—N/a	43%	33%	11%	—N/a	—N/a	13%	52%	48%
27 Feb – 26 Mar 2025	YouGov (MRP)	10,217	—N/a	38.3%	29.3%	15.7%	4.9%	8.1%	3.6%	50%	50%
22 Jan – 12 Feb 2025	YouGov (MRP)	8,732	—N/a	40.5%	30.3%	13.8%	5.8%	8%	1.7%	51.5%	48.5%
29 Oct – 20 Nov 2024	Accent/RedBridge (MRP)	4,909	—N/a	45%	33%	10%	—N/a	—N/a	11%	53%	47%
10 Jul – 27 Aug 2024	Accent/RedBridge (MRP)	5,976	—N/a	46%	31%	14%	—N/a	—N/a	9%	53%	47%
21 May 2022	2022 federal election			41.5%	32.8%	13.9%	2.3%	1.3%	8.3%	50.2%	49.8%

=== Dunkley ===
Date	Firm	Sample size	Margin of error	Primary vote						2PP vote	
Date	Firm	Sample size	Margin of error	ALP	LIB	GRN	IND	ONP	OTH	ALP	LIB
3 May 2025	2025 federal election			38.3%	32.3%	11.6%	2.9%	6.9%	8.0%	57.1%	42.9%
1–29 Apr 2025	YouGov (MRP)	10,822	—N/a	39.2%	29.6%	12.9%	4%	7.8%	6.5%	57.5%	42.5%
3 Feb – 1 Apr 2025	Accent/RedBridge (MRP)	9,953	—N/a	36%	34%	12%	—N/a	—N/a	19%	54%	46%
27 Feb – 26 Mar 2025	YouGov (MRP)	10,217	—N/a	32.9%	32.7%	13.6%	8.2%	7.4%	5.2%	53.6%	46.4%
22 Jan – 12 Feb 2025	YouGov (MRP)	8,732	—N/a	35.1%	32.1%	11.9%	6.5%	10.1%	4.2%	53.6%	46.4%
29 Oct – 20 Nov 2024	Accent/RedBridge (MRP)	4,909	—N/a	37%	37%	10%	—N/a	—N/a	15%	52%	48%
10 Jul – 27 Aug 2024	Accent/RedBridge (MRP)	5,976	—N/a	38%	36%	9%	—N/a	—N/a	18%	53%	47%
2 Mar 2024	2024 by-election			41.1%	39.2%	6.4%	4.7%	—	8.6%	52.7%	47.3%
15–22 Feb 2024	YouGov	394	±6.1%	33%	40%	9%	7%	—N/a	8.8%	49%	51%
5–6 Feb 2024	uComms (Note: Sponsored by the Australia Institute)	626	±3.9%	40.1%	39.3%	8.2%	—N/a	—N/a	12.4%	52%	48%
21 May 2022	2022 federal election			40.2%	32.5%	10.3%	3.9%	2.8%	10.3%	56.3%	43.7%

=== Flinders ===
Date	Firm	Sample size	Margin of error	Primary vote						2CP vote		
Date	Firm	Sample size	Margin of error	LIB	ALP	IND	GRN	ONP	OTH	LIB	ALP	IND
3 May 2025	2025 federal election			41.2%	22.3%	22.1%	6.4%	5.3%	2.7%	52.3%	—	47.7%
1–29 Apr 2025	YouGov (MRP)	10,822	—N/a	38.1%	20.5%	19.1%	8.6%	7.1%	6.6%	54.9%	45.1%	—N/a
21 Apr 2025	Trumpet of Patriots candidate Jason Smart withdraws and endorses One Nation											
3 Feb – 1 Apr 2025	Accent/RedBridge (MRP)	9,953	—N/a	43%	24%	—N/a	8%	—N/a	24%	55%	45%	—N/a
27 Feb – 26 Mar 2025	YouGov (MRP)	10,217	—N/a	40.4%	22.2%	14.5%	11.4%	8.3%	3.3%	55.8%	44.2%	—N/a
Late Feb 2025	Climate 200	—N/a	±3%	38%	—N/a	—N/a	—N/a	—N/a	—N/a	51%	—N/a	49%
Between Mar – Dec 2024	Climate 200	—N/a	—N/a	40%	—N/a	—N/a	—N/a	—N/a	—N/a	—N/a	—N/a	—N/a
22 Jan – 12 Feb 2025	YouGov (MRP)	8,732	—N/a	43.2%	21.6%	15.3%	10.2%	7%	2.8%	57.7%	42.3%	—N/a
29 Oct – 20 Nov 2024	Accent/RedBridge (MRP)	4,909	—N/a	48%	25%	—N/a	8%	—N/a	19%	58%	42%	—N/a
10 Jul – 27 Aug 2024	Accent/RedBridge (MRP)	5,976	—N/a	46%	26%	—N/a	9%	—N/a	19%	56%	44%	—N/a
Feb – May 2024	Accent/RedBridge (MRP)	4,040	—N/a	41%	24%	—N/a	10%	—N/a	25%	58%	42%	—N/a
21 May 2022	2022 federal election			43.5%	21.7%	12.5%	9.4%	3.4%	9.5%	56.7%	43.3%	—

=== Fraser ===
Date	Firm	Sample size	Margin of error	Primary vote						2PP vote		
Date	Firm	Sample size	Margin of error	ALP	LIB	GRN	ONP	IND	OTH	ALP	LIB	GRN
3 May 2025	2025 federal election			42.6%	16.9%	25.3%	4.8%	—	10.4%	59.2%	—	40.8%
1–29 Apr 2025	YouGov (MRP)	10,822	—N/a	41.1%	20.8%	17.8%	8.2%	—N/a	12%	63.3%	36.7%	
3 Feb – 1 Apr 2025	Accent/RedBridge (MRP)	9,953	—N/a	41%	24%	15%	—N/a	—N/a	19%	65%	35%	
27 Feb – 26 Mar 2025	YouGov (MRP)	10,217	—N/a	38%	27.2%	19.8%	5.9%	4.3%	4.8%	60.6%	39.4%	
22 Jan – 12 Feb 2025	YouGov (MRP)	8,732	—N/a	39.2%	27%	19.7%	5.5%	5.6%	3%	61.3%	38.7%	
29 Oct – 20 Nov 2024	Accent/RedBridge (MRP)	4,909	—N/a	37%	28%	23%	—N/a	—N/a	12%	64%	36%	
10 Jul – 27 Aug 2024	Accent/RedBridge (MRP)	5,976	—N/a	36%	26%	22%	—N/a	—N/a	16%	64%	36%	
21 May 2022	2022 federal election			42.1%	24.7%	18.5%	2.9%	—	11.8%	66.5%	33.5%	—

=== Gellibrand ===
Date	Firm	Sample size	Margin of error	Primary vote						2PP vote	
Date	Firm	Sample size	Margin of error	ALP	LIB	GRN	ONP	IND	OTH	ALP	LIB
3 May 2025	2025 federal election			46.6%	26.2%	17.0%	6.0%	—	4.2%	65.1%	44.9%
1–29 Apr 2025	YouGov (MRP)	10,822	—N/a	46.6%	26%	12.7%	8.8%	—N/a	5.9%	62.3%	37.7%
3 Feb – 1 Apr 2025	Accent/RedBridge (MRP)	9,953	—N/a	40%	31%	17%	—N/a	—N/a	12%	58%	42%
27 Feb – 26 Mar 2025	YouGov (MRP)	10,217	—N/a	36.9%	29.9%	16.4%	7.3%	5.1%	4.5%	57.6%	42.4%
22 Jan – 12 Feb 2025	YouGov (MRP)	8,732	—N/a	37.4%	30.3%	17.4%	6.9%	5%	3%	57.8%	42.2%
29 Oct – 20 Nov 2024	Accent/RedBridge (MRP)	4,909	—N/a	38%	31%	11%	—N/a	—N/a	20%	55%	45%
10 Jul – 27 Aug 2024	Accent/RedBridge (MRP)	5,976	—N/a	42%	34%	13%	—N/a	—N/a	11%	57%	43%
21 May 2022	2022 federal election			42.7%	27%	16.5%	3%	—	10.7%	61.5%	38.5%

=== Gippsland ===
Date	Firm	Sample size	Margin of error	Primary vote						2PP vote	
Date	Firm	Sample size	Margin of error	NAT	ALP	ONP	GRN	IND	OTH	NAT	ALP
3 May 2025	2025 federal election			52.5%	21.3%	14.4%	8.5%	—	3.3%	69.4%	30.6%
1–29 Apr 2025	YouGov (MRP)	10,822	—N/a	45.5%	24.2%	13.9%	7%	—N/a	9.4%	61.5%	38.5%
3 Feb – 1 Apr 2025	Accent/RedBridge (MRP)	9,953	—N/a	38%	16%	—N/a	6%	—N/a	40%	71%	29%
27 Feb – 26 Mar 2025	YouGov (MRP)	10,217	—N/a	48.7%	21.5%	12.5%	9.8%	4.9%	2.4%	62.4%	37.6%
22 Jan – 12 Feb 2025	YouGov (MRP)	8,732	—N/a	49.2%	20.8%	14.6%	7.8%	6.4%	1.2%	64.1%	35.9%
29 Oct – 20 Nov 2024	Accent/RedBridge (MRP)	4,909	—N/a	45%	14%	—N/a	7%	—N/a	34%	74%	26%
10 Jul – 27 Aug 2024	Accent/RedBridge (MRP)	5,976	—N/a	48%	13%	—N/a	7%	—N/a	33%	76%	24%
21 May 2022	2022 federal election			54.1%	19.2%	9.4%	8.5%	—	8.8%	70.6%	29.4%

=== Goldstein ===
Date	Firm	Sample size	Margin of error	Primary vote						2CP vote	
Date	Firm	Sample size	Margin of error	LIB	IND	ALP	GRN	ONP	OTH	IND	LIB
3 May 2025	2025 federal election			43.4%	30.7%	13.7%	7.2%	1.8%	3.2%	49.9%	50.1%
1–29 Apr 2025	YouGov (MRP)	10,822	—N/a	29.4%	47.5%	12.3%	7.2%	2.9%	0.8%	63.5%	36.5%
3 Feb – 1 Apr 2025	Accent/RedBridge (MRP)	9,953	—N/a	37%	—N/a	12%	6%	—N/a	45%	51%	49%
18–25 Mar 2025	uComms	1,225	—N/a	—N/a	—N/a	—N/a	—N/a	3.9%	—N/a	54%	46%
12–13 Mar 2025	JWS Research	800	—N/a	44%	24%	21%	5%	—N/a	6%	46%	54%
5–7 Mar 2025	Freshwater Strategy	830	—N/a	41%	33%	7%	7%	—N/a	12%	Loss	Win
27 Feb – 26 Mar 2025	YouGov (MRP)	10,217	—N/a	36.1%	34.6%	16.8%	9.8%	2.1%	0.5%	54.5%	45.5%
12–25 Feb 2025	uComms	979	—N/a	—N/a	—N/a	—N/a	—N/a	—N/a	—N/a	52%	48%
22 Jan – 12 Feb 2025	YouGov (MRP)	8,732	—N/a	36.8%	32.6%	17%	9.7%	3.1%	0.7%	54.3%	45.7%
29 Oct – 20 Nov 2024	Accent/RedBridge (MRP)	4,909	—N/a	44%	—N/a	11%	7%	—N/a	37%	52%	48%
10 Jul – 27 Aug 2024	Accent/RedBridge (MRP)	5,976	—N/a	49%	—N/a	17%	6%	—N/a	29%	47%	53%
Feb–May 2024	Accent/RedBridge (MRP)	4,040	—N/a	38%	—N/a	14%	9%	—N/a	38%	53%	47%
21 May 2022	2022 federal election			40.4%	34.5%	11%	7.8%	1.3%	5%	52.9%	47.1%

=== Gorton ===
Date	Firm	Sample size	Margin of error	Primary vote						2PP vote	
Date	Firm	Sample size	Margin of error	ALP	LIB	GRN	ONP	IND	OTH	ALP	LIB
3 May 2025	2025 federal election			43.0%	29.2%	10.8%	6.3%	—	10.7%	60.3%	39.7%
1–29 Apr 2025	YouGov (MRP)	10,822	—N/a	37.8%	27.8%	12.5%	11.8%	—N/a	10.2%	56.2%	43.8%
3 Feb – 1 Apr 2025	Accent/RedBridge (MRP)	9,953	—N/a	42%	29%	16%	—N/a	—N/a	13%	62%	38%
27 Feb – 26 Mar 2025	YouGov (MRP)	10,217	—N/a	33.4%	33.4%	11.4%	10.2%	6.1%	5.5%	52.2%	47.8%
22 Jan – 12 Feb 2025	YouGov (MRP)	8,732	—N/a	34.6%	35.8%	11.5%	9.7%	5.8%	2.7%	51.5%	48.5%
29 Oct – 20 Nov 2024	Accent/RedBridge (MRP)	4,909	—N/a	40%	33%	10%	—N/a	—N/a	17%	57%	43%
10 Jul – 27 Aug 2024	Accent/RedBridge (MRP)	5,976	—N/a	41%	34%	9%	—N/a	—N/a	16%	56%	44%
21 May 2022	2022 federal election			41.3%	27.4%	9%	7.3%	2.5%	12.5%	60.0%	40.0%

=== Hawke ===
Date	Firm	Sample size	Margin of error	Primary vote						2PP vote	
Date	Firm	Sample size	Margin of error	ALP	LIB	GRN	IND	ONP	OTH	ALP	LIB
3 May 2025	2025 federal election			39.1%	30.2%	9.8%	—	9.7%	11.2%	57.6%	42.4%
1–29 Apr 2025	YouGov (MRP)	10,822	—N/a	36.4%	29.8%	11.5%	—N/a	12.7%	9.5%	54.1%	45.9%
3 Feb – 1 Apr 2025	Accent/RedBridge (MRP)	9,953	—N/a	31%	39%	13%	—N/a	—N/a	18%	50%	50%
27 Feb – 26 Mar 2025	YouGov (MRP)	10,217	—N/a	30.2%	31.1%	11.7%	10.5%	12.3%	4.2%	51.9%	48.1%
22 Jan – 12 Feb 2025	YouGov (MRP)	8,732	—N/a	30.8%	32.2%	11.8%	9.1%	12.6%	3.5%	51.2%	48.8%
29 Oct – 20 Nov 2024	Accent/RedBridge (MRP)	4,909	—N/a	31%	36%	8%	—N/a	—N/a	24%	50%	50%
10 Jul – 27 Aug 2024	Accent/RedBridge (MRP)	5,976	—N/a	39%	31%	11%	—N/a	—N/a	18%	57%	43%
21 May 2022	2022 federal election			36.7%	26.3%	8.9%	7.9%	5.6%	14.5%	57.6%	42.4%

=== Holt ===
Date	Firm	Sample size	Margin of error	Primary vote						2PP vote	
Date	Firm	Sample size	Margin of error	ALP	LIB	GRN	ONP	IND	OTH	ALP	LIB
3 May 2025	2025 federal election			45.0%	25.1%	11.2%	8.7%	—	10.0%	64.0%	36.0%
1–29 Apr 2025	YouGov (MRP)	10,822	—N/a	38.1%	30.2%	12.2%	12.1%	—N/a	7.4%	55.1%	44.9%
3 Feb – 1 Apr 2025	Accent/RedBridge (MRP)	9,953	—N/a	36%	38%	13%	—N/a	—N/a	13%	52%	48%
27 Feb – 26 Mar 2025	YouGov (MRP)	10,217	—N/a	33.6%	32%	13.4%	11.5%	5.1%	4.4%	53.3%	46.7%
22 Jan – 12 Feb 2025	YouGov (MRP)	8,732	—N/a	35.8%	31.1%	12.4%	10.8%	5.7%	4.3%	54.4%	45.6%
29 Oct – 20 Nov 2024	Accent/RedBridge (MRP)	4,909	—N/a	35%	37%	14%	—N/a	—N/a	14%	52%	48%
10 Jul – 27 Aug 2024	Accent/RedBridge (MRP)	5,976	—N/a	36%	33%	14%	—N/a	—N/a	17%	55%	45%
21 May 2022	2022 federal election			40.9%	29.6%	8.5%	4.8%	3%	13.2%	57.1%	42.9%

=== Hotham ===
Date	Firm	Sample size	Margin of error	Primary vote						2PP vote	
Date	Firm	Sample size	Margin of error	ALP	LIB	GRN	ONP	IND	OTH	ALP	LIB
3 May 2025	2025 federal election			48.8%	25.7%	14.9%	4.7%	—	5.9%	66.9%	33.1%
1–29 Apr 2025	YouGov (MRP)	10,822	—N/a	46.5%	24.7%	13.9%	6.3%	—N/a	8.6%	63.6%	36.4%
3 Feb – 1 Apr 2025	Accent/RedBridge (MRP)	9,953	—N/a	43%	33%	14%	—N/a	—N/a	10%	60%	40%
27 Feb – 26 Mar 2025	YouGov (MRP)	10,217	—N/a	36.4%	31.7%	16.5%	5.5%	5.4%	4.6%	56.7%	43.3%
22 Jan – 12 Feb 2025	YouGov (MRP)	8,732	—N/a	37.4%	32.7%	15%	5.5%	6.4%	3%	56.2%	43.8%
29 Oct – 20 Nov 2024	Accent/RedBridge (MRP)	4,909	—N/a	42%	35%	14%	—N/a	—N/a	8%	59%	41%
10 Jul – 27 Aug 2024	Accent/RedBridge (MRP)	5,976	—N/a	43%	36%	12%	—N/a	—N/a	9%	57%	43%
21 May 2022	2022 federal election			47%	25.2%	12.4%	2.9%	—	12.4%	64.3%	35.8%

=== Indi ===
Date	Firm	Sample size	Margin of error	Primary vote							2CP vote	
Date	Firm	Sample size	Margin of error	IND	LIB	ALP	ONP	NAT	GRN	OTH	IND	LIB
3 May 2025	2025 federal election			43.7%	30.7%	8.4%	7.2%	—	3.6%	6.4%	58.6%	41.4%
1–29 Apr 2025	YouGov (MRP)	10,822	—N/a	53.2%	26.2%	8.2%	6.7%	—N/a	4.5%	1.2%	66.1%	33.9%
3 Feb – 1 Apr 2025	Accent/RedBridge (MRP)	9,953	—N/a	—N/a	33%	10%	—N/a	—N/a	4%	53%	59%	41%
27 Feb – 26 Mar 2025	YouGov (MRP)	10,217	—N/a	42.5%	32.5%	11.5%	6.8%	—N/a	6.3%	0.5%	58.6%	41.4%
22 Jan – 12 Feb 2025	YouGov (MRP)	8,732	—N/a	37.4%	34.7%	12.7%	6.5%	—N/a	7.9%	0.7%	56.2%	43.8%
29 Oct – 20 Nov 2024	Accent/RedBridge (MRP)	4,909	—N/a	—N/a	37%	8%	—N/a	—N/a	3%	52%	61%	39%
10 Jul – 27 Aug 2024	Accent/RedBridge (MRP)	5,976	—N/a	—N/a	32%	9%	—N/a	—N/a	5%	54%	65%	35%
21 May 2022	2022 federal election			40.7%	30.5%	8.6%	5.3%	3.8%	3.6%	7.6%	58.9%	41.1%

=== Isaacs ===
Date	Firm	Sample size	Margin of error	Primary vote						2PP vote	
Date	Firm	Sample size	Margin of error	ALP	LIB	GRN	ONP	IND	OTH	ALP	LIB
3 May 2025	2025 federal election			49.4%	28.3%	14.1%	4.6%	—	3.6%	64.3%	35.7%
1–29 Apr 2025	YouGov (MRP)	10,822	—N/a	42.7%	27.9%	14%	7.3%	—N/a	8.1%	60%	40%
3 Feb – 1 Apr 2025	Accent/RedBridge (MRP)	9,953	—N/a	43%	33%	11%	—N/a	—N/a	13%	58%	42%
27 Feb – 26 Mar 2025	YouGov (MRP)	10,217	—N/a	36.5%	31.6%	14.5%	6%	6.2%	5.2%	56.3%	43.7%
22 Jan – 12 Feb 2025	YouGov (MRP)	8,732	—N/a	37.7%	33.1%	13.1%	7.1%	6.1%	2.9%	55.3%	44.7%
29 Oct – 20 Nov 2024	Accent/RedBridge (MRP)	4,909	—N/a	43%	38%	11%	—N/a	—N/a	8%	56%	44%
10 Jul – 27 Aug 2024	Accent/RedBridge (MRP)	5,976	—N/a	40%	34%	10%	—N/a	—N/a	15%	55%	45%
21 May 2022	2022 federal election			40%	31.9%	12.9%	3.2%	—	12.1%	56.9%	43.2%

=== Jagajaga ===
Date	Firm	Sample size	Margin of error	Primary vote						2PP vote	
Date	Firm	Sample size	Margin of error	ALP	LIB	GRN	IND	ONP	OTH	ALP	LIB
3 May 2025	2025 federal election			42.6%	29.4%	15.6%	6.0%	3.9%	2.5%	62.9%	37.1%
1–29 Apr 2025	YouGov (MRP)	10,822	—N/a	38.8%	27.2%	17.6%	6.6%	5.4%	4.3%	60.8%	39.2%
3 Feb – 1 Apr 2025	Accent/RedBridge (MRP)	9,953	—N/a	43%	32%	13%	—N/a	—N/a	12%	61%	39%
27 Feb – 26 Mar 2025	YouGov (MRP)	10,217	—N/a	37%	30.2%	16.9%	7.7%	4.8%	3.4%	58.2:%	41.8%
22 Jan – 12 Feb 2025	YouGov (MRP)	8,732	—N/a	36.1%	32%	15.2%	8%	5.2%	3.6%	56.2%	43.8%
29 Oct – 20 Nov 2024	Accent/RedBridge (MRP)	4,909	—N/a	41%	37%	12%	—N/a	—N/a	10%	56%	44%
10 Jul – 27 Aug 2024	Accent/RedBridge (MRP)	5,976	—N/a	40%	35%	16%	—N/a	—N/a	9%	59%	41%
Feb – May 2024	Accent/RedBridge (MRP)	4,040	—N/a	39%	33%	18%	—N/a	—N/a	10%	61%	39%
21 May 2022	2022 federal election			40.9%	29.2%	16.7%	3.1%	2.3%	7.9%	62.4%	37.7%

=== Kooyong ===
Date	Firm	Sample size	Margin of error	Primary vote						2CP vote	
Date	Firm	Sample size	Margin of error	LIB	IND	ALP	GRN	ONP	OTH	IND	LIB
3 May 2025	2025 federal election			43.1%	33.9%	11.9%	7.8%	1.0%	2.3%	50.7%	49.3%
1–29 Apr 2025	YouGov (MRP)	10,822	—N/a	32.8%	43.3%	12.7%	8.1%	2.4%	0.7%	60.1%	39.9%
3 Feb – 1 Apr 2025	Accent/RedBridge (MRP)	9,953	—N/a	40%	—N/a	12%	9%	—N/a	38%	48%	52%
12–13 March 2025	JWS Research	800	—N/a	40%	32%	11%	9%	—N/a	8%	51%	49%
5–7 Mar 2025	Freshwater Strategy	830	—N/a	41%	33%	7%	7%	—N/a	12%	Loss	Win
27 Feb – 26 Mar 2025	YouGov (MRP)	10,217	—N/a	39%	30.1%	16.9%	11.6%	2.1%	0.4%	51.2%	48.8%
22 Jan – 12 Feb 2025	YouGov (MRP)	8,732	—N/a	38.7%	29.4%	16.5%	12.2%	2.7%	0.4%	52.4%	47.6%
29 Oct – 20 Nov 2024	Accent/RedBridge (MRP)	4,909	—N/a	42%	—N/a	11%	9%	—N/a	37%	53%	47%
10 Jul – 27 Aug 2024	Accent/RedBridge (MRP)	5,976	—N/a	43%	—N/a	12%	4%	—N/a	41%	53%	47%
Feb – May 2024	Accent/RedBridge (MRP)	4,040	—N/a	39%	—N/a	10%	7%	—N/a	43%	52%	48%
5 Feb 2024	uComms	647	±3.9%	36.8%	32.5%	12.1%	6.8%	—N/a	2%	56%	44%
Mid-Aug 2023	KJC Research	—N/a	—N/a	—N/a	—N/a	—N/a	—N/a	—N/a	—N/a	46.5%	53.5%
24–25 Jul 2023	uComms	821	±3.4%	40.3%	31.6%	12.4%	5.6%	—N/a	2.9%	51%	49%
21 May 2022	2022 federal election			42.7%	40.3%	6.9%	6.3%	0.7%	3.1%	52.9%	47.1%

=== La Trobe ===
Date	Firm	Sample size	Margin of error	Primary vote						2PP vote	
Date	Firm	Sample size	Margin of error	LIB	ALP	GRN	ONP	IND	OTH	LIB	ALP
3 May 2025	2025 federal election			39.1%	32.1%	12.9%	7.7%	—	7.2%	52.1%	47.9%
1–29 Apr 2025	YouGov (MRP)	10,822	—N/a	42.9%	28.2%	10.8%	10.3%	—N/a	7.8%	56.3%	43.7%
3 Feb – 1 Apr 2025	Accent/RedBridge (MRP)	9,953	—N/a	45%	26%	11%	—N/a	—N/a	18%	58%	42%
27 Feb – 26 Mar 2025	YouGov (MRP)	10,217	—N/a	41.8%	25.5%	13.1%	9.8%	5.4%	4.4%	55.5%	44.5%
22 Jan – 12 Feb 2025	YouGov (MRP)	8,732	—N/a	42.1%	26.8%	12.8%	11.1%	4.5%	2.7%	55.6%	44.4%
29 Oct – 20 Nov 2024	Accent/RedBridge (MRP)	4,909	—N/a	42%	24%	9%	—N/a	—N/a	25%	60%	40%
10 Jul – 27 Aug 2024	Accent/RedBridge (MRP)	5,976	—N/a	45%	24%	7%	—N/a	—N/a	24%	61%	39%
21 May 2022	2022 federal election			45.6%	26.1%	10.9%	5%	—	12.5%	58.7%	41.3%

=== Lalor ===
Date	Firm	Sample size	Margin of error	Primary vote						2PP vote	
Date	Firm	Sample size	Margin of error	ALP	LIB	GRN	ONP	IND	OTH	ALP	LIB
3 May 2025	2025 federal election			43.6%	26.1%	15.3%	7.0%	2.1%	5.9%	63.2%	36.8%
1–29 Apr 2025	YouGov (MRP)	10,822	—N/a	40.2%	26%	13.6%	9.7%	2.6%	8%	59.5%	40.5%
3 Feb – 1 Apr 2025	Accent/RedBridge (MRP)	9,953	—N/a	35%	33%	12%	—N/a	—N/a	20%	55%	45%
27 Feb – 26 Mar 2025	YouGov (MRP)	10,217	—N/a	34.3%	29.4%	14.5%	9.5%	7%	5.3%	55.8%	44.2%
22 Jan – 12 Feb 2025	YouGov (MRP)	8,732	—N/a	37.1%	29.1%	13.8%	9.3%	6.3%	4.4%	56.9%	43.1%
29 Oct – 20 Nov 2024	Accent/RedBridge (MRP)	4,909	—N/a	40%	32%	13%	—N/a	—N/a	14%	58%	42%
10 Jul – 27 Aug 2024	Accent/RedBridge (MRP)	5,976	—N/a	42%	31%	13%	—N/a	—N/a	13%	60%	40%
21 May 2022	2022 federal election			44.1%	25%	10.4%	3.9%	2.9%	13.7%	62.8%	37.2%

=== Macnamara ===
Date	Firm	Sample size	Margin of error	Primary vote						2PP vote	
Date	Firm	Sample size	Margin of error	ALP	GRN	LIB	IND	ONP	OTH	ALP	LIB
3 May 2025	2025 federal election			36.1%	25.5%	32.5%	1.8%	2.8%	1.3%	61.8%	38.2%
1–29 Apr 2025	YouGov (MRP)	10,822	—N/a	31.1%	26.7%	27.4%	4.7%	5%	5.1%	58%	42%
3 Feb – 1 Apr 2025	Accent/RedBridge (MRP)	9,953	—N/a	35%	20%	32%	—N/a	—N/a	12%	58%	42%
16 Mar 2025 (released)	Insightfully	600	—N/a	25.9%	27.9%	37.6%	—N/a	—N/a	—N/a	—N/a	—N/a
27 Feb – 26 Mar 2025	YouGov (MRP)	10,217	—N/a	33.9%	25.4%	28.1%	5.6%	4.4%	2.7%	60%	40%
22 Jan – 12 Feb 2025	YouGov (MRP)	8,732	—N/a	31.6%	29.7%	27.6%	5.8%	3.2%	2.1%	58.3%	41.7%
29 Oct – 20 Nov 2024	Accent/RedBridge (MRP)	4,909	—N/a	35%	35%	21%	—N/a	—N/a	9%	58%	42%
10 Jul – 27 Aug 2024	Accent/RedBridge (MRP)	5,976	—N/a	36%	32%	22%	—N/a	—N/a	10%	60%	40%
13–20 Jun 2024	RedBridge	401	±5.9%	30%	21%	36%	—N/a	—N/a	13%	55%	45%
Feb – May 2024	Accent/RedBridge (MRP)	4,040	—N/a	33%	24%	34%	—N/a	—N/a	9%	59%	41%
21 May 2022	2022 federal election			31.8%	29.7%	29%	2%	1.5%	6.2%	62.3%	37.8%

=== Mallee ===
Date	Firm	Sample size	Margin of error	Primary vote						2PP vote	
Date	Firm	Sample size	Margin of error	NAT	ALP	IND	ONP	GRN	OTH	NAT	ALP
3 May 2025	2025 federal election			49.7%	19.1%	—	11.0%	9.1%	11.1%	69.0%	31.0%
1–29 Apr 2025	YouGov (MRP)	10,822	—N/a	46.6%	19%	—N/a	16%	7.8%	10.5%	64.6%	35.4%
3 Feb – 1 Apr 2025	Accent/RedBridge (MRP)	9,953	—N/a	44%	19%	—N/a	—N/a	6%	30%	65%	35%
27 Feb – 26 Mar 2025	YouGov (MRP)	10,217	—N/a	44.7%	18.1%	13.5%	14.5%	6.7%	2.5%	62.7%	37.3%
22 Jan – 12 Feb 2025	YouGov (MRP)	8,732	—N/a	47.3%	15.4%	14.8%	12.8%	7.7%	2.1%	64.2%	35.8%
29 Oct – 20 Nov 2024	Accent/RedBridge (MRP)	4,909	—N/a	46%	18%	—N/a	—N/a	6%	30%	67%	33%
10 Jul – 27 Aug 2024	Accent/RedBridge (MRP)	5,976	—N/a	45%	16%	—N/a	—N/a	6%	33%	67%	33%
21 May 2022	2022 federal election			49.1%	16.8%	12.2%	6.8%	5.3%	9.9%	69%	31%

=== Maribyrnong ===
Date	Firm	Sample size	Margin of error	Primary vote						2PP vote	
Date	Firm	Sample size	Margin of error	ALP	LIB	GRN	ONP	IND	OTH	ALP	LIB
3 May 2025	2025 federal election			41.4%	30.5%	21.2%	6.9%	—	—	62.6%	37.4%
1–29 Apr 2025	YouGov (MRP)	10,822	—N/a	47.3%	28.1%	16.9%	7.6%	—N/a	—N/a	63.5%	36.5%
3 Feb – 1 Apr 2025	Accent/RedBridge (MRP)	9,953	—N/a	43%	28%	17%	—N/a	—N/a	12%	63%	37%
27 Feb – 26 Mar 2025	YouGov (MRP)	10,217	—N/a	36.2%	30.5%	16.7%	5%	5.8%	5.8%	57.4%	42.6%
22 Jan – 12 Feb 2025	YouGov (MRP)	8,732	—N/a	36.6%	31.9%	16.4%	5.7%	6.2%	3.3%	56.6%	43.4%
29 Oct – 20 Nov 2024	Accent/RedBridge (MRP)	4,909	—N/a	39%	30%	14%	—N/a	—N/a	18%	58%	42%
10 Jul – 27 Aug 2024	Accent/RedBridge (MRP)	5,976	—N/a	44%	33%	13%	—N/a	—N/a	10%	60%	40%
21 May 2022	2022 federal election			42.4%	27.1%	16.3%	2.4%	—	11.9%	62.5%	37.6%

=== McEwen ===
Date	Firm	Sample size	Margin of error	Primary vote						2PP vote	
Date	Firm	Sample size	Margin of error	ALP	LIB	GRN	ONP	IND	OTH	ALP	LIB
3 May 2025	2025 federal election			37.3%	32.5%	11.1%	6.6%	—	12.5%	54.8%	45.2%
1–29 Apr 2025	YouGov (MRP)	10,822	—N/a	32.5%	30%	14.8%	11.3%	—N/a	11.4%	53.2%	46.8%
3 Feb – 1 Apr 2025	Accent/RedBridge (MRP)	9,953	—N/a	34%	36%	13%	—N/a	—N/a	17%	50%	50%
27 Feb – 26 Mar 2025	YouGov (MRP)	10,217	—N/a	30.6%	35%	13.8%	11.1%	5.5%	3.9%	50.5%	49.5%
22 Jan – 12 Feb 2025	YouGov (MRP)	8,732	—N/a	31.8%	37.3%	13.4%	10.2%	4.7%	2.6%	49.7%	50.3%
29 Oct – 20 Nov 2024	Accent/RedBridge (MRP)	4,909	—N/a	32%	40%	16%	—N/a	—N/a	13%	49%	51%
10 Jul – 27 Aug 2024	Accent/RedBridge (MRP)	5,976	—N/a	34%	39%	13%	—N/a	—N/a	14%	49%	51%
21 May 2022	2022 federal election			36.8%	33.2%	14.1%	5.6%	—	10.2%	53.3%	46.7%

=== Melbourne ===
Date	Firm	Sample size	Margin of error	Primary vote						2CP vote	
Date	Firm	Sample size	Margin of error	GRN	ALP	LIB	IND	ONP	OTH	GRN	ALP
3 May 2025	2025 federal election			39.5%	31.3%	19.8%	4.9%	2.5%	2.0%	47.0%	53.0%
1–29 Apr 2025	YouGov (MRP)	10,822	—N/a	43.1%	28.2%	15.6%	6.4%	4.2%	2.5%	56.1%	43.9%
3 Feb – 1 Apr 2025	Accent/RedBridge (MRP)	9,953	—N/a	43%	22%	21%	—N/a	—N/a	14%	57%	43%
16 Mar 2025 (released)	Insightfully	600	—N/a	50.1%	19.2%	21.6%	—N/a	—N/a	9.1%	—N/a	—N/a
27 Feb – 26 Mar 2025	YouGov (MRP)	10,217	—N/a	41.3%	30.9%	19.4%	2.8%	2.1%	3.5%	52.7%	47.3%
22 Jan – 12 Feb 2025	YouGov (MRP)	8,732	—N/a	42.2%	29.8%	18.8%	4%	2.7%	2.5%	55%	45%
29 Oct – 20 Nov 2024	Accent/RedBridge (MRP)	4,909	—N/a	27%	21%	44%	—N/a	—N/a	7%	55%	45%
10 Jul – 27 Aug 2024	Accent/RedBridge (MRP)	5,976	—N/a	44%	22%	22%	—N/a	—N/a	12%	57%	43%
21 May 2022	2022 federal election			49.6%	25%	15.2%	1.1%	1%	8.1%	60.2%	39.9%

=== Menzies ===
Date	Firm	Sample size	Margin of error	Primary vote						2PP vote	
Date	Firm	Sample size	Margin of error	LIB	ALP	GRN	ONP	IND	OTH	LIB	ALP
3 May 2025	2025 federal election			40.6%	34.7%	11.0%	2.0%	6.4%	5.3%	48.9%	51.1%
1–29 Apr 2025	YouGov (MRP)	10,822	—N/a	36.3%	30.5%	12.7%	5.1%	5.6%	9.7%	49.7%	50.3%
3 Feb – 1 Apr 2025	Accent/RedBridge (MRP)	9,953	—N/a	47%	33%	12%	—N/a	—N/a	7%	53%	47%
27 Feb – 26 Mar 2025	YouGov (MRP)	10,217	—N/a	40.4%	27.6%	14%	4.9%	6.6%	6.5%	52.6%	47.4%
22 Jan – 12 Feb 2025	YouGov (MRP)	8,732	—N/a	43.8%	27.5%	13.3%	4.6%	7.4%	3.3%	54.5%	45.5%
29 Oct – 20 Nov 2024	Accent/RedBridge (MRP)	4,909	—N/a	47%	31%	15%	—N/a	—N/a	6%	53%	47%
10 Jul – 27 Aug 2024	Accent/RedBridge (MRP)	5,976	—N/a	46%	33%	12%	—N/a	—N/a	9%	53%	47%
21 May 2022	2022 federal election			42.1%	33.3%	14.1%	2.3%	—	8.2%	50.7%	49.3%

=== Monash ===
Date	Firm	Sample size	Margin of error	Primary vote						2PP vote		
Date	Firm	Sample size	Margin of error	LIB	ALP	IND	GRN	ONP	OTH	LIB	ALP	IND
3 May 2025	2025 federal election			31.8%	20.3%	27.3%	4.9%	8.0%	7.7%	54.1%	45.9%	—
1–29 Apr 2025	YouGov (MRP)	10,822	—N/a	29.4%	20.1%	24.9%	7.8%	9.6%	8.1%	45.9%	—N/a	54.1%
3 Feb – 1 Apr 2025	Accent/RedBridge (MRP)	9,953	—N/a	32%	20%	—N/a	6%	—N/a	42%	48%	—N/a	52%
27 Feb – 26 Mar 2025	YouGov (MRP)	10,217	—N/a	36.4%	22.3%	12.6%	10.9%	15.5%	2.4%	55.3%	44.7%	—N/a
22 Jan – 12 Feb 2025	YouGov (MRP)	8,732	—N/a	39.1%	22.3%	14.2%	10.9%	11.8%	1.7%	56%	44%	—N/a
Between Mar–Dec 2024	Climate 200	—N/a	—N/a	26%	—N/a	—N/a	—N/a	—N/a	—N/a	—N/a	—N/a	—N/a
29 Oct – 20 Nov 2024	Accent/RedBridge (MRP)	4,909	—N/a	44%	26%	—N/a	8%	—N/a	22%	57%	43%	—N/a
10 Jul – 27 Aug 2024	Accent/RedBridge (MRP)	5,976	—N/a	39%	25%	—N/a	9%	—N/a	28%	54%	46%	—N/a
14 Nov 2023	Russell Broadbent resigns from the Liberal Party to sit as an independent											
21 May 2022	2022 federal election			37.8%	25.6%	10.7%	9.9%	7.5%	8.5%	52.9%	47.1%	—

=== Nicholls ===
Date	Firm	Sample size	Margin of error	Primary vote							2PP vote		
Date	Firm	Sample size	Margin of error	NAT	IND	LIB	ALP	ONP	GRN	OTH	NAT	IND	ALP
3 May 2025	2025 federal election			46.3%	—	—	24.2%	11.5%	7.8%	10.2%	64.4%	—	35.6%
1–29 Apr 2025	YouGov (MRP)	10,822	—N/a	53.1%	—N/a	—N/a	21%	14%	7.6%	4.3%	66.4%	—N/a	33.6%
3 Feb – 1 Apr 2025	Accent/RedBridge (MRP)	9,953	—N/a	42%	—N/a	—N/a	19%	—N/a	6%	33%	55%	45%	—N/a
27 Feb – 26 Mar 2025	YouGov (MRP)	10,217	—N/a	41.9%	22.7%	—N/a	15.7%	12.3%	6.2%	1.3%	55.2%	44.8%	—N/a
22 Jan – 12 Feb 2025	YouGov (MRP)	8,732	—N/a	42.6%	23.1%	—N/a	14.4%	12.2%	6.4%	1.2%	55.4%	44.6%	—N/a
29 Oct – 20 Nov 2024	Accent/RedBridge (MRP)	4,909	—N/a	44%	—N/a	—N/a	18%	—N/a	5%	33%	53%	47%	—N/a
10 Jul – 27 Aug 2024	Accent/RedBridge (MRP)	5,976	—N/a	44%	—N/a	—N/a	23%	—N/a	5%	28%	54%	46%	—N/a
21 May 2022	2022 federal election			26.1%	25.5%	18.1%	11.5%	6.5%	3.2%	9%	53.8%	46.2%	—

=== Scullin ===
Date	Firm	Sample size	Margin of error	Primary vote						2PP vote	
Date	Firm	Sample size	Margin of error	ALP	LIB	GRN	ONP	IND	OTH	ALP	LIB
3 May 2025	2025 federal election			44.9%	20.5%	9.4%	6.6%	—	18.6%	64.3%	35.7%
1–29 Apr 2025	YouGov (MRP)	10,822	—N/a	41.7%	20.8%	14%	11.3%	—N/a	12.2%	62.1%	37.9%
3 Feb – 1 Apr 2025	Accent/RedBridge (MRP)	9,953	—N/a	46%	25%	13%	—N/a	—N/a	17%	65%	35%
27 Feb – 26 Mar 2025	YouGov (MRP)	10,217	—N/a	36.4%	28.8%	13.4%	9.9%	4.1%	7.4%	56.4%	43.6%
22 Jan – 12 Feb 2025	YouGov (MRP)	8,732	—N/a	35.8%	29.7%	14.8%	9.2%	5%	5.6%	56.1%	43.9%
29 Oct – 20 Nov 2024	Accent/RedBridge (MRP)	4,909	—N/a	44%	31%	13%	—N/a	—N/a	11%	61%	39%
10 Jul – 27 Aug 2024	Accent/RedBridge (MRP)	5,976	—N/a	42%	27%	9%	—N/a	—N/a	22%	59%	41%
21 May 2022	2022 federal election			46.3%	21.7%	10.9%	6.5%	—	14.6%	65.6%	34.4%

=== Wannon ===
Date	Firm	Sample size	Margin of error	Primary vote						2CP vote	
Date	Firm	Sample size	Margin of error	LIB	IND	ALP	GRN	ONP	OTH	LIB	IND
3 May 2025	2025 federal election			43.6%	31.4%	10.6%	3.2%	4.2%	7.0%	53.3%	46.7%
1–29 Apr 2025	YouGov (MRP)	10,822	—N/a	29.7%	46.1%	12%	4.5%	5.3%	2.4%	38.1%	61.9%
17–24 Apr 2025	YouGov	—N/a	±6%	33.2%	35.7%	12.2%	5.2%	6.9%	6.8% (Note: 2.3% for Trumpet of Patriots and 4.5% for all others.)	43%	57%
3 Feb – 1 Apr 2025	Accent/RedBridge (MRP)	9,953	—N/a	45%	—N/a	22%	7%	—N/a	27%	54%	46%
27 Feb – 26 Mar 2025	YouGov (MRP)	10,217	—N/a	37.7%	28.7%	18.6%	7.4%	7.1%	0.6%	49.4%	50.6%
22 Jan – 12 Feb 2025	YouGov (MRP)	8,732	—N/a	41.4%	25.3%	18%	8%	6.6%	0.8%	52.1%	47.9%
29 Oct – 20 Nov 2024	Accent/RedBridge (MRP)	4,909	—N/a	48%	—N/a	24%	6%	—N/a	21%	55%	45%
10 Jul – 27 Aug 2024	Accent/RedBridge (MRP)	5,976	—N/a	44%	—N/a	24%	7%	—N/a	26%	51%	49%
21 May 2022	2022 federal election			44.5%	19.3%	19.1%	6.4%	3.2%	7.5%	53.9%	46.1%

=== Wills ===
Date	Firm	Sample size	Margin of error	Primary vote						2CP vote	
Date	Firm	Sample size	Margin of error	ALP	GRN	LIB	ONP	IND	OTH	ALP	GRN
3 May 2025	2025 federal election			35.6%	35.4%	12.9%	3.5%	—	12.6%	51.4%	48.6%
1–29 Apr 2025	YouGov (MRP)	10,822	—N/a	36.5%	29.8%	17.2%	5.2%	—N/a	11.2%	55.5%	44.5%
3 Feb – 1 Apr 2025	Accent/RedBridge (MRP)	9,953	—N/a	47%	22%	22%	—N/a	—N/a	9%	66%	33%
16 Mar 2025 (released)	Insightfully	600	—N/a	—N/a	33.1%	—N/a	—N/a	—N/a	—N/a	53.7%	46.3%
27 Feb – 26 Mar 2025	YouGov (MRP)	10,217	—N/a	32.9%	29.9%	20.7%	4.7%	4.9%	7%	53.9%	46.1%
22 Jan – 12 Feb 2025	YouGov (MRP)	8,732	—N/a	35%	30.8%	22.7%	4.1%	3.7%	3.7%	53.8%	46.2%
29 Oct – 20 Nov 2024	Accent/RedBridge (MRP)	4,909	—N/a	41%	21%	25%	—N/a	—N/a	12%	62%	38%
10 Jul – 27 Aug 2024	Accent/RedBridge (MRP)	5,976	—N/a	44%	22%	22%	—N/a	—N/a	12%	65%	35%
21 May 2022	2022 federal election			38.9%	28.3%	17.3%	2.8%	—	12.8%	58.6%	41.4%

== Western Australia ==
=== Brand ===
Date	Firm	Sample size	Margin of error	Primary vote						2PP vote	
Date	Firm	Sample size	Margin of error	ALP	LIB	GRN	ONP	IND	OTH	ALP	LIB
3 May 2025	2025 federal election			45.9%	19.7%	13.2%	12.7%	—	8.5%	66.9%	33.1%
1–29 Apr 2025	YouGov (MRP)	10,822	—N/a	46.9%	20.4%	16%	10.7%	—N/a	6%	65.9%	34.1%
3 Feb – 1 Apr 2025	Accent/RedBridge (MRP)	9,953	—N/a	42%	26%	15%	—N/a	—N/a	17%	62%	38%
27 Feb – 26 Mar 2025	YouGov (MRP)	10,217	—N/a	43.8%	25.7%	12.2%	9.5%	4%	4.9%	61.4%	38.6%
22 Jan – 12 Feb 2025	YouGov (MRP)	8,732	—N/a	39.1%	26.7%	12.6%	11.5%	6.1%	4%	58.3%	41.7%
29 Oct – 20 Nov 2024	Accent/RedBridge (MRP)	4,909	—N/a	48%	30%	9%	—N/a	—N/a	14%	61%	39%
10 Jul – 27 Aug 2024	Accent/RedBridge (MRP)	5,976	—N/a	44%	26%	18%	—N/a	—N/a	12%	64%	36%
21 May 2022	2022 federal election			50.2%	22%	11.4%	5.4%	—	11%	66.7%	33.3%

=== Bullwinkel ===
Date	Firm	Sample size	Margin of error	Primary vote							2PP vote	
Date	Firm	Sample size	Margin of error	ALP	LIB	GRN	ONP	NAT	IND	OTH	ALP	LIB
3 May 2025	2025 federal election			32.0%	24.3%	11.2%	8.6%	15.8%	—	8.1%	50.5%	49.5%
1–29 Apr 2025	YouGov (MRP)	10,822	—N/a	34.9%	32.2%	15.5%	9%	—N/a	—N/a	8.3%	54.1%	45.9%
3 Feb – 1 Apr 2025	Accent/RedBridge (MRP)	9,953	—N/a	33%	40%	12%	—N/a	—N/a	—N/a	15%	50%	50%
17–24 Apr 2025	YouGov	—N/a	—N/a	32%	32%	—N/a	—N/a	8%	—N/a	28%	—N/a	—N/a
27 Feb – 26 Mar 2025	YouGov (MRP)	10,217	—N/a	33.7%	34.8%	11.9%	9.1%	—N/a	6.8%	3.6%	52%	48%
11–12 Feb 2025	JWS Research	c. 830	—N/a	15%	41%	—N/a	—N/a	22%	—N/a	—N/a	—N/a	—N/a
22 Jan – 12 Feb 2025	YouGov (MRP)	8,732	—N/a	30.5%	37.2%	12.2%	9.1%	—N/a	8.1%	2.9%	49.2%	50.8%
29 Oct – 20 Nov 2024	Accent/RedBridge (MRP)	4,909	—N/a	32%	40%	8%	—N/a	—N/a	—N/a	20%	47%	53%
10 Jul – 27 Aug 2024	Accent/RedBridge (MRP)	5,976	—N/a	34%	38%	11%	—N/a	—N/a	—N/a	18%	50%	50%
21 Aug 2024 (released)	Unnamed (Note: Commissioned by the National Party)	800	—N/a	23%	12%	10%	—N/a	20%	10%	—N/a	—N/a	—N/a
31 May 2024	Creation of the Division of Bullwinkel announced											

=== Burt ===
Date	Firm	Sample size	Margin of error	Primary vote						2PP vote	
Date	Firm	Sample size	Margin of error	ALP	LIB	GRN	ONP	IND	OTH	ALP	LIB
3 May 2025	2025 federal election			46.7%	19.1%	11.5%	9.9%	2.2%	10.6%	65.7%	34.3%
1–29 Apr 2025	YouGov (MRP)	10,822	—N/a	45.5%	21.5%	11.3%	10.9%	1.9%	8.9%	63.3%	36.7%
3 Feb – 1 Apr 2025	Accent/RedBridge (MRP)	9,953	—N/a	48%	26%	15%	—N/a	—N/a	10%	64%	36%
27 Feb – 26 Mar 2025	YouGov (MRP)	10,217	—N/a	39.5%	28%	12.1%	11%	4.6%	4.8%	57.9%	42.1%
22 Jan – 12 Feb 2025	YouGov (MRP)	8,732	—N/a	37.2%	28.9%	13%	10.9%	5.5%	4.5%	56.4%	43.6%
29 Oct – 20 Nov 2024	Accent/RedBridge (MRP)	4,909	—N/a	47%	32%	12%	—N/a	—N/a	10%	60%	40%
10 Jul – 27 Aug 2024	Accent/RedBridge (MRP)	5,976	—N/a	47%	30%	11%	—N/a	—N/a	12%	60%	40%
21 May 2022	2022 federal election			51.6%	23%	9.8%	4.9%	—	10.7%	65.2%	34.8%

=== Canning ===
Date	Firm	Sample size	Margin of error	Primary vote						2PP vote	
Date	Firm	Sample size	Margin of error	LIB	ALP	GRN	ONP	IND	OTH	LIB	ALP
3 May 2025	2025 federal election			42.5%	29.9%	8.9%	11.4%	—	7.3%	56.6%	43.4%
1–29 Apr 2025	YouGov (MRP)	10,822	—N/a	36.6%	32.7%	13.1%	10.6%	—N/a	7%	50.2%	49.8%
3 Feb – 1 Apr 2025	Accent/RedBridge (MRP)	9,953	—N/a	44%	27%	10%	—N/a	—N/a	19%	56%	44%
27 Feb – 26 Mar 2025	YouGov (MRP)	10,217	—N/a	39.2%	32.2%	9.1%	8.5%	6.9%	4.1%	51.6%	48.4%
22 Jan – 12 Feb 2025	YouGov (MRP)	8,732	—N/a	41.6%	25.6%	9.9%	9.2%	10.7%	3.1%	55.9%	44.1%
29 Oct – 20 Nov 2024	Accent/RedBridge (MRP)	4,909	—N/a	41%	24%	7%	—N/a	—N/a	28%	57%	43%
10 Jul – 27 Aug 2024	Accent/RedBridge (MRP)	5,976	—N/a	44%	30%	9%	—N/a	—N/a	17%	55%	45%
21 May 2022	2022 federal election			43.8%	32.8%	8.1%	4.5%	1.8%	9%	53.6%	46.4%

=== Cowan ===
Date	Firm	Sample size	Margin of error	Primary vote						2PP vote	
Date	Firm	Sample size	Margin of error	ALP	LIB	GRN	ONP	IND	OTH	ALP	LIB
3 May 2025	2025 federal election			46.6%	24.2%	10.8%	5.1%	3.5%	9.8%	63.6%	36.4%
1–29 Apr 2025	YouGov (MRP)	10,822	—N/a	39.7%	25.2%	12%	10.3%	5.5%	7.2%	59.4%	40.6%
3 Feb – 1 Apr 2025	Accent/RedBridge (MRP)	9,953	—N/a	44%	33%	15%	—N/a	—N/a	9%	60%	40%
27 Feb – 26 Mar 2025	YouGov (MRP)	10,217	—N/a	39.8%	32.3%	11.4%	8.3%	4.4%	3.8%	56.1%	43.9%
22 Jan – 12 Feb 2025	YouGov (MRP)	8,732	—N/a	35.8%	32.2%	13.2%	7.9%	6.7%	4.2%	54.8%	45.2%
29 Oct – 20 Nov 2024	Accent/RedBridge (MRP)	4,909	—N/a	43%	36%	11%	—N/a	—N/a	11%	57%	43%
10 Jul – 27 Aug 2024	Accent/RedBridge (MRP)	5,976	—N/a	43%	35%	10%	—N/a	—N/a	13%	57%	43%
21 May 2022	2022 federal election			46.9%	30.4%	9.9%	2.9%	—	10%	60.8%	39.2%

=== Curtin ===
Date	Firm	Sample size	Margin of error	Primary vote						2CP vote	
Date	Firm	Sample size	Margin of error	LIB	IND	ALP	GRN	ONP	OTH	IND	LIB
3 May 2025	2025 federal election			40.3%	32.2%	14.8%	7.8%	2.6%	2.3%	53.3%	46.7%
1–29 Apr 2025	YouGov (MRP)	10,822	—N/a	34.5%	33.8%	16.4%	10.2%	4.2%	1%	55.7%	44.3%
3 Feb – 1 Apr 2025	Accent/RedBridge (MRP)	9,953	—N/a	38%	—N/a	18%	9%	—N/a	34%	53%	47%
5–7 Mar 2025	Freshwater Strategy	830	—N/a	41%	33%	7%	7%	—N/a	12%	Loss	Win
27 Feb – 26 Mar 2025	YouGov (MRP)	10,217	—N/a	38.2%	28.4%	18.5%	11.8%	2.4%	0.7%	51.2%	48.8%
11–12 Feb 2025	JWS Research	c. 830	—N/a	56%	28%	—N/a	—N/a	—N/a	—N/a	35%	65%
22 Jan – 12 Feb 2025	YouGov (MRP)	8,732	—N/a	37.4%	29.4%	17.6%	12.4%	2.7%	0.5%	53.4%	46.6%
29 Oct – 20 Nov 2024	Accent/RedBridge (MRP)	4,909	—N/a	39%	—N/a	19%	12%	—N/a	31%	49%	51%
10 Jul – 27 Aug 2024	Accent/RedBridge (MRP)	5,976	—N/a	46%	—N/a	23%	8%	—N/a	22%	47%	53%
21 May 2022	2022 federal election			41.3%	29.5%	14.0%	10.4%	1.3%	3.7%	51.3%	48.7%

=== Durack ===
Date	Firm	Sample size	Margin of error	Primary vote							2PP vote	
Date	Firm	Sample size	Margin of error	LIB	ALP	NAT	GRN	ONP	IND	OTH	LIB	ALP
3 May 2025	2025 federal election			32.9%	23.4%	13.6%	8.2%	10.1%	—	11.8%	60.2%	39.9%
1–29 Apr 2025	YouGov (MRP)	10,822	—N/a	39.3%	28.7%	—N/a	10.4%	13.3%	—N/a	8.3%	54.9%	45.1%
3 Feb – 1 Apr 2025	Accent/RedBridge (MRP)	9,953	—N/a	43%	23%	—N/a	9%	—N/a	—N/a	24%	58%	42%
27 Feb – 26 Mar 2025	YouGov (MRP)	10,217	—N/a	40.9%	27.4%	—N/a	10.5%	12.8%	4.7%	3.6%	55.4%	44.6%
22 Jan – 12 Feb 2025	YouGov (MRP)	8,732	—N/a	40.8%	27.2%	—N/a	11.8%	12.4%	4.9%	2.9%	55.2%	44.8%
29 Oct – 20 Nov 2024	Accent/RedBridge (MRP)	4,909	—N/a	44%	21%	—N/a	6%	—N/a	—N/a	28%	62%	38%
10 Jul – 27 Aug 2024	Accent/RedBridge (MRP)	5,976	—N/a	46%	23%	—N/a	7%	—N/a	—N/a	23%	61%	39%
21 May 2022	2022 federal election			34.3%	29.2%	10.2%	9.5%	6.9%	—	9.9%	54.3%	45.7%

=== Forrest ===
Date	Firm	Sample size	Margin of error	Primary vote						2PP vote		
Date	Firm	Sample size	Margin of error	LIB	ALP	GRN	ONP	IND	OTH	LIB	ALP	IND
3 May 2025	2025 federal election			31.2%	22.5%	7.9%	8.7%	18.3%	11.4%	52.2%	47.8%	—
1–29 Apr 2025	YouGov (MRP)	10,822	—N/a	36.1%	21.4%	12.3%	8.8%	13.2%	8.2%	53.9%	46.1%	—N/a
9–10 Apr 2025	uComms	c. 1,000	—N/a	34%	—N/a	—N/a	—N/a	20%	—N/a	49%	—N/a	51%
3 Feb – 1 Apr 2025	Accent/RedBridge (MRP)	9,953	—N/a	42%	26%	9%	—N/a	—N/a	23%	56%	44%	—N/a
27 Feb – 26 Mar 2025	YouGov (MRP)	10,217	—N/a	40.8%	28.1%	12.4%	9.2%	4.9%	4.6%	53.8%	46.2%	—N/a
Late Feb 2025	Climate 200	—N/a	±3%	37%	—N/a	—N/a	—N/a	—N/a	—N/a	51%	—N/a	49%
22 Jan – 12 Feb 2025	YouGov (MRP)	8,732	—N/a	43.2%	25.3%	13%	8.9%	7%	2.7%	56.2%	—N/a	43.8%
Between Mar–Dec 2024	Climate 200	—N/a	—N/a	38%	—N/a	—N/a	—N/a	—N/a	—N/a	—N/a	—N/a	—N/a
29 Oct – 20 Nov 2024	Accent/RedBridge (MRP)	4,909	—N/a	44%	25%	9%	—N/a	—N/a	22%	58%	42%	—N/a
10 Jul – 27 Aug 2024	Accent/RedBridge (MRP)	5,976	—N/a	45%	25%	14%	—N/a	—N/a	17%	56%	44%	—N/a
21 May 2022	2022 federal election			43.1%	27.4%	13.4%	5.3%	—	10.7%	54.3%	45.7%	—

=== Fremantle ===
Date	Firm	Sample size	Margin of error	Primary vote						2PP vote		
Date	Firm	Sample size	Margin of error	ALP	LIB	GRN	ONP	IND	OTH	ALP	LIB	IND
3 May 2025	2025 federal election			38.6%	18.9%	11.6%	6.1%	23.0%	1.8%	50.7%	—	49.3%
1–29 Apr 2025	YouGov (MRP)	10,822	—N/a	37.6%	22.1%	16.9%	7.3%	10.2%	5.8%	62.2%	37.8%	—N/a
3 Feb – 1 Apr 2025	Accent/RedBridge (MRP)	9,953	—N/a	49%	24%	13%	—N/a	—N/a	14%	68%	32%	—N/a
27 Feb – 26 Mar 2025	YouGov (MRP)	10,217	—N/a	37%	27.8%	17.4%	7%	5.8%	5%	59.1%	40.9%	—N/a
22 Jan – 12 Feb 2025	YouGov (MRP)	8,732	—N/a	36.4%	29.5%	17.8%	6.6%	5.8%	3.9%	57.9%	42.1%	—N/a
29 Oct – 20 Nov 2024	Accent/RedBridge (MRP)	4,909	—N/a	44%	29%	18%	—N/a	—N/a	9%	65%	35%	—N/a
10 Jul – 27 Aug 2024	Accent/RedBridge (MRP)	5,976	—N/a	45%	27%	17%	—N/a	—N/a	12%	65%	35%	—N/a
21 May 2022	2022 federal election			44%	24.2%	18.1%	3.1%	—	10.6%	66.9%	33.1%	—

=== Hasluck ===
Date	Firm	Sample size	Margin of error	Primary vote						2PP vote	
Date	Firm	Sample size	Margin of error	ALP	LIB	GRN	ONP	IND	OTH	ALP	LIB
3 May 2025	2025 federal election			48.3%	22.1%	12.5%	7.4%	—	9.7%	66.0%	34.0%
1–29 Apr 2025	YouGov (MRP)	10,822	—N/a	43%	28.3%	14.1%	8%	—N/a	6.6%	60%	40%
3 Feb – 1 Apr 2025	Accent/RedBridge (MRP)	9,953	—N/a	41%	35%	13%	—N/a	—N/a	10%	57%	43%
27 Feb – 26 Mar 2025	YouGov (MRP)	10,217	—N/a	38.9%	32.3%	11.8%	8.1%	5.6%	3.4%	55.9%	44.1%
22 Jan – 12 Feb 2025	YouGov (MRP)	8,732	—N/a	32.8%	34.3%	13.5%	8.3%	8.3%	2.9%	52.4%	47.6%
29 Oct – 20 Nov 2024	Accent/RedBridge (MRP)	4,909	—N/a	41%	37%	11%	—N/a	—N/a	11%	55%	45%
10 Jul – 27 Aug 2024	Accent/RedBridge (MRP)	5,976	—N/a	43%	35%	10%	—N/a	—N/a	13%	57%	43%
21 May 2022	2022 federal election			39.7%	33.4%	11%	3.8%	3.4%	8.7%	56.0%	44.0%

=== Moore ===
Date	Firm	Sample size	Margin of error	Primary vote						2PP vote	
Date	Firm	Sample size	Margin of error	LIB	ALP	GRN	ONP	IND	OTH	LIB	ALP
3 May 2025	2025 federal election			31.5%	32.5%	11.1%	4.5%	16.3%	4.1%	47.1%	52.9%
1–29 Apr 2025	YouGov (MRP)	10,822	—N/a	36.9%	30.4%	13.3%	7.6%	5%	6.8%	50.3%	49.7%
3 Feb – 1 Apr 2025	Accent/RedBridge (MRP)	9,953	—N/a	45%	33%	10%	—N/a	—N/a	12%	54%	46%
27 Feb – 26 Mar 2025	YouGov (MRP)	10,217	—N/a	39.5%	29.7%	12.4%	6.5%	7.4%	4.6%	51.7%	48.3%
22 Jan – 12 Feb 2025	YouGov (MRP)	8,732	—N/a	44.5%	26.4%	13.1%	6.4%	6.7%	2.9%	55.8%	44.2%
1 Jan 2025	Ian Goodenough resigns from the Liberal Party to sit as an independent										
29 Oct – 20 Nov 2024	Accent/RedBridge (MRP)	4,909	—N/a	43%	31%	11%	—N/a	—N/a	14%	53%	47%
10 Jul – 27 Aug 2024	Accent/RedBridge (MRP)	5,976	—N/a	44%	32%	12%	—N/a	—N/a	12%	53%	47%
21 May 2022	2022 federal election			41.8%	32.7%	14.3%	3.4%	—	7.8%	50.7%	49.3%

=== O'Connor ===
Date	Firm	Sample size	Margin of error	Primary vote						2PP vote	
Date	Firm	Sample size	Margin of error	LIB	ALP	GRN	ONP	IND	OTH	LIB	ALP
3 May 2025	2025 federal election			34.4%	21.1%	10.0%	11.0%	—	23.5%	63.3%	36.7%
1–29 Apr 2025	YouGov (MRP)	10,822	—N/a	38.2%	24.9%	13.6%	11.2%	—N/a	12%	55.1%	44.9%
3 Feb – 1 Apr 2025	Accent/RedBridge (MRP)	9,953	—N/a	33%	26%	6%	—N/a	—N/a	35%	54%	46%
27 Feb – 26 Mar 2025	YouGov (MRP)	10,217	—N/a	41.2%	24.3%	10.1%	15.9%	4.3%	4.2%	57.8%	42.2%
22 Jan – 12 Feb 2025	YouGov (MRP)	8,732	—N/a	43.9%	23.3%	12.1%	11%	6.1%	3.6%	58.3%	41.7%
29 Oct – 20 Nov 2024	Accent/RedBridge (MRP)	4,909	—N/a	42%	31%	8%	—N/a	—N/a	19%	54%	46%
10 Jul – 27 Aug 2024	Accent/RedBridge (MRP)	5,976	—N/a	43%	22%	10%	—N/a	—N/a	25%	60%	40%
21 May 2022	2022 federal election			44.8%	26.6%	10.6%	7.1%	—	10.9%	57%	43%

=== Pearce ===
Date	Firm	Sample size	Margin of error	Primary vote						2PP vote	
Date	Firm	Sample size	Margin of error	ALP	LIB	GRN	ONP	IND	OTH	ALP	LIB
3 May 2025	2025 federal election			40.1%	28.5%	11.9%	9.2%	—	10.3%	56.4%	43.6%
1–29 Apr 2025	YouGov (MRP)	10,822	—N/a	37.3%	28.7%	13.9%	11.8%	—N/a	8.3%	56%	44%
3 Feb – 1 Apr 2025	Accent/RedBridge (MRP)	9,953	—N/a	40%	32%	15%	—N/a	—N/a	13%	58%	42%
27 Feb – 26 Mar 2025	YouGov (MRP)	10,217	—N/a	34.4%	33%	12.3%	10.9%	4.5%	5%	52.9%	47.1%
22 Jan – 12 Feb 2025	YouGov (MRP)	8,732	—N/a	32.7%	34.8%	12.7%	10.9%	5.4%	3.5%	51.1%	48.9%
29 Oct – 20 Nov 2024	Accent/RedBridge (MRP)	4,909	—N/a	36%	34%	15%	—N/a	—N/a	14%	55%	45%
10 Jul – 27 Aug 2024	Accent/RedBridge (MRP)	5,976	—N/a	42%	33%	12%	—N/a	—N/a	13%	57%	43%
21 May 2022	2022 federal election			42.8%	29.9%	11%	4.5%	—	11.8%	59%	41%

=== Perth ===
Date	Firm	Sample size	Margin of error	Primary vote						2PP vote	
Date	Firm	Sample size	Margin of error	ALP	LIB	GRN	ONP	IND	OTH	ALP	LIB
3 May 2025	2025 federal election			43.1%	26.1%	24.5%	6.3%	—	—	66.5%	33.5%
1–29 Apr 2025	YouGov (MRP)	10,822	—N/a	41.1%	25.8%	22.7%	10.4%	—N/a	—N/a	62.6%	37.4%
3 Feb – 1 Apr 2025	Accent/RedBridge (MRP)	9,953	—N/a	45%	28%	12%	—N/a	—N/a	15%	63%	37%
27 Feb – 26 Mar 2025	YouGov (MRP)	10,217	—N/a	36.5%	28.5%	20.6%	5.9%	4.9%	3.5%	59.5%	40.5%
22 Jan – 12 Feb 2025	YouGov (MRP)	8,732	—N/a	36.5%	29.6%	21%	5.7%	4.9%	2.3%	58.9%	41.1%
29 Oct – 20 Nov 2024	Accent/RedBridge (MRP)	4,909	—N/a	44%	28%	19%	—N/a	—N/a	9%	65%	35%
10 Jul – 27 Aug 2024	Accent/RedBridge (MRP)	5,976	—N/a	42%	29%	18%	—N/a	—N/a	11%	63%	37%
21 May 2022	2022 federal election			39.3%	26.7%	22.2%	2.7%	—	9.2%	64.8%	35.2%

=== Swan ===
Date	Firm	Sample size	Margin of error	Primary vote						2PP vote	
Date	Firm	Sample size	Margin of error	ALP	LIB	GRN	ONP	IND	OTH	ALP	LIB
3 May 2025	2025 federal election			42.6%	26.9%	17.5%	5.2%	—	7.8%	64.0%	36.0%
1–29 Apr 2025	YouGov (MRP)	10,822	—N/a	39.4%	28.8%	16.3%	8.4%	—N/a	7.1%	58.5%	41.5%
3 Feb – 1 Apr 2025	Accent/RedBridge (MRP)	9,953	—N/a	46%	30%	14%	—N/a	—N/a	10%	63%	37%
27 Feb – 26 Mar 2025	YouGov (MRP)	10,217	—N/a	36.2%	32.6%	15.9%	6.1%	4.9%	4.2%	55.9%	44.1%
22 Jan – 12 Feb 2025	YouGov (MRP)	8,732	—N/a	33.6%	33.7%	16.2%	7.1%	6.2%	3.2%	53.9%	46.1%
29 Oct – 20 Nov 2024	Accent/RedBridge (MRP)	4,909	—N/a	41%	32%	14%	—N/a	—N/a	13%	59%	41%
10 Jul – 27 Aug 2024	Accent/RedBridge (MRP)	5,976	—N/a	43%	34%	12%	—N/a	—N/a	10%	59%	41%
21 May 2022	2022 federal election			39.1%	32.1%	14.9%	2.5%	—	11.5%	58.8%	41.2%

=== Tangney ===
Date	Firm	Sample size	Margin of error	Primary vote						2PP vote	
Date	Firm	Sample size	Margin of error	LIB	ALP	GRN	ONP	IND	OTH	ALP	LIB
3 May 2025	2025 federal election			34.2%	42.5%	13.0%	4.1%	—	6.2%	57.0%	43.0%
1–29 Apr 2025	YouGov (MRP)	10,822	—N/a	37%	37.4%	14.8%	5.5%	—N/a	5.3%	53.5%	46.5%
3 Feb – 1 Apr 2025	Accent/RedBridge (MRP)	9,953	—N/a	39%	41%	10%	—N/a	—N/a	10%	54%	46%
24 Apr 2025	KJC Research	600	—N/a	—N/a	—N/a	—N/a	—N/a	—N/a	—N/a	45%	49%
27 Feb – 26 Mar 2025	YouGov (MRP)	10,217	—N/a	38.6%	36.2%	12.1%	4.6%	5.1%	3.4%	52.1%	47.9%
11–12 Feb 2025	JWS Research	c. 830	—N/a	41%	35%	—N/a	—N/a	—N/a	—N/a	44%	56%
22 Jan – 12 Feb 2025	YouGov (MRP)	8,732	—N/a	42.1%	31.4%	11.1%	5.3%	6.7%	3.4%	52.5%	47.5%
29 Oct – 20 Nov 2024	Accent/RedBridge (MRP)	4,909	—N/a	40%	38%	14%	—N/a	—N/a	8%	53%	47%
10 Jul – 27 Aug 2024	Accent/RedBridge (MRP)	5,976	—N/a	45%	38%	10%	—N/a	—N/a	7%	50%	50%
21 May 2022	2022 federal election			40%	38.1%	12%	2.1%	—	7.9%	52.4%	47.6%

== See also ==
- Opinion polling for the 2025 Australian federal election
