= Electoral results for the Division of Scullin =

Australian division election results

This is a list of electoral results for the Division of Scullin in Australian federal elections from the division's creation in 1969 until the present.

== Members ==
Member	Party	Term
Harry Jenkins Sr.	Labor	1969–1986
Harry Jenkins Jr.	Labor	1986–2013
Andrew Giles	Labor	2013–present

== Election results ==
=== Elections in the 2020s ===
==== 2025 ====
2025 Australian federal election: Scullin
Party	Candidate	Votes	%	±%
Labor	Andrew Giles	43,122	44.88	−1.33
Liberal	Rohit Taggar	19,709	20.51	−1.26
Greens	Loki Sangarya	9,049	9.42	−1.44
One Nation	Arthur Tsoutsoulis	6,384	6.64	+0.16
Victorian Socialists	Omar Hassan	6,191	6.44	+3.73
Trumpet of Patriots	Adriana Buccianti	5,476	5.70	+5.64
Family First	Cassandra Bell	3,737	3.89	+3.89
People First	Ursula van Bree	2,421	2.52	+2.52
Total formal votes		96,089	92.46	−1.78
Informal votes		7,838	7.54	+1.78
Turnout		103,927	90.40	+5.24
Two-party-preferred result
Labor	Andrew Giles	61,799	64.31	−1.12
Liberal	Rohit Taggar	34,290	35.69	+1.12
Labor hold		Swing	−1.12	

Results are not final. Last updated on 16 May 2025 at 10:40 PM AEST.

==== 2022 ====
2022 Australian federal election: Scullin
Party	Candidate	Votes	%	±%
Labor	Andrew Giles	42,147	46.25	−14.17
Liberal	Virosh Perera	19,780	21.71	−0.60
Greens	Patchouli Paterson	9,953	10.92	+4.25
United Australia	Yassin Albarri	7,444	8.17	+3.13
One Nation	Ursula van Bree	5,907	6.48	+6.48
Liberal Democrats	Eric Koelmeyer	3,422	3.76	+3.76
Victorian Socialists	Cameron Rowe	2,469	2.71	+2.71
Total formal votes		91,122	94.31	−0.47
Informal votes		5,494	5.69	+0.47
Turnout		96,616	88.98	−3.25
Two-party-preferred result
Labor	Andrew Giles	59,761	65.58	−6.08
Liberal	Virosh Perera	31,361	34.42	+6.08
Labor hold		Swing	−6.08	

Alluvial diagram for preference flows in the seat of Scullin in the 2022 federal election. indicates at what stage the winning candidate had over 50% of the votes and was declared the winner.

=== Elections in the 2010s ===
==== 2019 ====
2019 Australian federal election: Scullin
Party	Candidate	Votes	%	±%
Labor	Andrew Giles	55,467	60.42	+1.03
Liberal	Gurpal Singh	20,484	22.31	−3.54
Greens	Cynthia Smith	6,128	6.67	−0.55
United Australia	Firas Hasan	4,625	5.04	+5.04
Animal Justice	Rod Whitfield	3,500	3.81	+0.51
Independent	Yassin Akram Albarri	1,605	1.75	+1.75
Total formal votes		91,809	94.78	+0.60
Informal votes		5,055	5.22	−0.60
Turnout		96,864	92.12	+2.21
Two-party-preferred result
Labor	Andrew Giles	65,787	71.66	+2.08
Liberal	Gurpal Singh	26,022	28.34	−2.08
Labor hold		Swing	+2.08	

==== 2016 ====
2016 Australian federal election: Scullin
Party	Candidate	Votes	%	±%
Labor	Andrew Giles	54,541	57.00	+6.74
Liberal	Melanie Stockman	27,261	28.49	−0.65
Greens	Rose Ljubicic	7,294	7.62	+0.13
Animal Justice	John Matlen	3,387	3.54	+3.54
Drug Law Reform	Adriana Buccianti	3,195	3.34	+3.34
Total formal votes		95,678	94.88	+1.31
Informal votes		5,164	5.12	−1.31
Turnout		100,842	91.20	−2.07
Two-party-preferred result
Labor	Andrew Giles	64,369	67.28	+2.93
Liberal	Melanie Stockman	31,309	32.72	−2.93
Labor hold		Swing	+2.93	

==== 2013 ====
2013 Australian federal election: Scullin
Party	Candidate	Votes	%	±%
Labor	Andrew Giles	45,484	50.26	−9.55
Liberal	Jag Chugha	26,369	29.14	+3.47
Greens	Rose Ljubicic	6,780	7.49	−1.70
Palmer United	Peter Cooper	5,991	6.62	+6.62
Sex Party	Nathan Rolph	2,453	2.71	+2.71
Family First	Katie Conlon	2,394	2.65	−2.43
Katter's Australian	Domenic Greco	1,025	1.13	+1.13
Total formal votes		90,496	93.57	−0.71
Informal votes		6,214	6.43	+0.71
Turnout		96,710	93.26	−0.92
Two-party-preferred result
Labor	Andrew Giles	58,232	64.35	−6.18
Liberal	Jag Chugha	32,264	35.65	+6.18
Labor hold		Swing	−6.18	

==== 2010 ====
2010 Australian federal election: Scullin
Party	Candidate	Votes	%	±%
Labor	Harry Jenkins	49,310	62.12	−1.20
Liberal	Max Williams	19,142	24.11	−0.28
Greens	Gurm Sekhon	6,702	8.44	+2.41
Family First	Ian Stratov	4,226	5.32	+0.59
Total formal votes		79,380	94.01	−1.93
Informal votes		5,055	5.99	+1.93
Turnout		84,435	92.97	−2.73
Two-party-preferred result
Labor	Harry Jenkins	57,355	72.25	+1.40
Liberal	Max Williams	22,025	27.75	−1.40
Labor hold		Swing	+1.40	

=== Elections in the 2000s ===
==== 2007 ====
2007 Australian federal election: Scullin
Party	Candidate	Votes	%	±%
Labor	Harry Jenkins	51,680	63.32	+4.30
Liberal	Charles Williams	19,910	24.39	−6.52
Greens	Linda Laos	4,918	6.03	+1.00
Family First	Tania Byers	3,859	4.73	+1.34
Democrats	Peter Hude	868	1.06	+1.06
Citizens Electoral Council	Simon Steer	386	0.47	−1.17
Total formal votes		81,621	95.94	+0.69
Informal votes		3,452	4.06	−0.69
Turnout		85,073	95.67	+0.10
Two-party-preferred result
Labor	Harry Jenkins	57,830	70.85	+6.06
Liberal	Charles Williams	23,791	29.15	−6.06
Labor hold		Swing	+6.06	

==== 2004 ====
2004 Australian federal election: Scullin
Party	Candidate	Votes	%	±%
Labor	Harry Jenkins	46,209	59.02	−5.27
Liberal	Lucas Kostadinoski	24,196	30.91	+5.21
Greens	Merinda Gray	3,941	5.03	+2.23
Family First	Amy Shand	2,656	3.39	+3.39
Citizens Electoral Council	Simon Steer	1,287	1.64	+0.92
Total formal votes		78,289	95.25	+0.20
Informal votes		3,905	4.75	−0.20
Turnout		82,194	95.57	−0.26
Two-party-preferred result
Labor	Harry Jenkins	50,726	64.79	−5.45
Liberal	Lucas Kostadinoski	27,563	35.21	+5.45
Labor hold		Swing	−5.45	

==== 2001 ====
2001 Australian federal election: Scullin
Party	Candidate	Votes	%	±%
Labor	Harry Jenkins	51,294	63.07	−4.65
Liberal	Lucas Kostadinoski	21,706	26.69	+2.25
Democrats	Brian Mawhinney	5,317	6.54	+0.71
Greens	Merinda Gray	2,422	2.98	+2.98
Citizens Electoral Council	Trudy Campbell	589	0.72	+0.72
Total formal votes		81,328	95.12	−1.41
Informal votes		4,174	4.88	+1.41
Turnout		85,502	96.62	
Two-party-preferred result
Labor	Harry Jenkins	56,265	69.17	−2.67
Liberal	Lucas Kostadinoski	25,051	30.83	+2.67
Labor hold		Swing	−2.67	

=== Elections in the 1990s ===
==== 1998 ====
1998 Australian federal election: Scullin
Party	Candidate	Votes	%	±%
Labor	Harry Jenkins	52,320	67.72	+4.44
Liberal	Peter Pratt	18,882	24.44	+0.17
Democrats	Hussein Tahiri	4,503	5.83	−2.90
Unity	M. Kheirallah	949	1.23	+1.23
Natural Law	Robert Brown	603	0.78	−0.90
Total formal votes		77,257	96.53	+0.07
Informal votes		2,777	3.47	−0.07
Turnout		80,034	96.18	−0.48
Two-party-preferred result
Labor	Harry Jenkins	55,500	71.84	+1.10
Liberal	Peter Pratt	21,757	28.16	−1.10
Labor hold		Swing	+1.10	

==== 1996 ====
1996 Australian federal election: Scullin
Party	Candidate	Votes	%	±%
Labor	Harry Jenkins	45,295	63.28	−2.06
Liberal	Marc Morgan	17,373	24.27	−1.28
Democrats	Evan Bekiaris	6,248	8.73	+5.50
Greens	Gurm Sekhon	1,460	2.04	+2.04
Natural Law	Neil Phillips	1,204	1.68	+1.14
Total formal votes		71,580	96.46	+0.38
Informal votes		2,630	3.54	−0.38
Turnout		74,210	96.66	−0.35
Two-party-preferred result
Labor	Harry Jenkins	50,494	70.74	−1.67
Liberal	Marc Morgan	20,888	29.26	+1.67
Labor hold		Swing	−1.67	

==== 1993 ====
1993 Australian federal election: Scullin
Party	Candidate	Votes	%	±%
Labor	Harry Jenkins	46,672	62.33	+14.46
Liberal	Barbara Smith	20,988	28.03	−7.75
Independent	John Siddons	2,648	3.54	+3.54
Democrats	John Georgievski	2,259	3.02	−11.23
Citizens Electoral Council	Don Veitch	1,027	1.37	+1.37
Independent	Jordan Grujovski	874	1.17	+1.17
Natural Law	Neil Phillips	412	0.55	+0.55
Total formal votes		74,880	96.13	+1.21
Informal votes		3,012	3.87	−1.21
Turnout		77,892	97.02	
Two-party-preferred result
Labor	Harry Jenkins	51,314	68.62	+9.23
Liberal	Barbara Smith	23,468	31.38	−9.23
Labor hold		Swing	+9.23	

==== 1990 ====
1990 Australian federal election: Scullin
Party	Candidate	Votes	%	±%
Labor	Harry Jenkins	32,046	47.9	−17.2
Liberal	Wayne Phillips	23,952	35.8	+8.2
Democrats	Malcolm Brown	9,537	14.2	+7.0
Independent	Steve Pollock	723	1.1	+1.1
Independent	Angelo Iacono	682	1.0	+1.0
Total formal votes		66,940	94.9	
Informal votes		3,578	5.1	
Turnout		70,518	96.3	
Two-party-preferred result
Labor	Harry Jenkins	39,679	59.4	−10.2
Liberal	Wayne Phillips	27,139	40.6	+10.2
Labor hold		Swing	−10.2	

=== Elections in the 1980s ===
==== 1987 ====
1987 Australian federal election: Scullin
Party	Candidate	Votes	%	±%
Labor	Harry Jenkins	37,158	68.7	−2.8
Liberal	Mike Kabos	12,991	24.0	+5.4
Democrats	Joe Privitelli	3,900	7.2	+0.5
Total formal votes		54,049	90.6	
Informal votes		5,581	9.4	
Turnout		59,630	95.4	
Two-party-preferred result
Labor	Harry Jenkins	39,539	73.2	−4.4
Liberal	Mike Kabos	14,497	26.8	+4.4
Labor hold		Swing	−4.4	

==== 1986 by-election ====
Scullin by-election, 1986
Party	Candidate	Votes	%	±%
Labor	Harry Jenkins	34,021	66.3	−5.2
Liberal	Domenic Cichello	11,741	22.9	+4.3
Democrats	Joseph Privitelli	3,727	7.3	+0.6
Socialist Workers	Maurice Sibelle	930	1.8	+1.8
Democratic Labor	John Mulholland	924	1.8	−1.4
Total formal votes		51,343	93.9	
Informal votes		3,318	6.1	
Turnout		54,661	87.5	
Two-party-preferred result
Labor	Harry Jenkins	37,562	73.2	−4.4
Liberal	Dominic Cichello	13,770	26.8	+4.4
Labor hold		Swing	−4.4	

==== 1984 ====
1984 Australian federal election: Scullin
Party	Candidate	Votes	%	±%
Labor	Harry Jenkins	36,513	71.5	+2.3
Liberal	Pamela Philpot	9,448	18.5	−3.9
Democrats	Jane Green	3,444	6.7	+2.1
Democratic Labor	Helen Walsh	1,635	3.2	+3.2
Total formal votes		51,040	85.9	
Informal votes		8,369	14.1	
Turnout		59,409	95.2	
Two-party-preferred result
Labor	Harry Jenkins	39,606	77.6	+2.2
Liberal	Pamela Philpot	11,416	22.4	−2.2
Labor hold		Swing	+2.2	

==== 1983 ====
1983 Australian federal election: Scullin
Party	Candidate	Votes	%	±%
Labor	Harry Jenkins	51,312	66.4	−0.7
Liberal	Katheryne Savage	19,519	25.3	−1.7
Democrats	Kenneth Peak	3,528	4.6	−1.2
Socialist Workers	Joan Barker	2,886	3.7	+3.7
Total formal votes		77,245	97.0	
Informal votes		2,352	3.0	
Turnout		79,597	96.3	
Two-party-preferred result
Labor	Harry Jenkins		72.6	+2.0
Liberal	Katheryne Savage		27.4	−2.0
Labor hold		Swing	+2.0	

==== 1980 ====
1980 Australian federal election: Scullin
Party	Candidate	Votes	%	±%
Labor	Harry Jenkins	46,883	67.1	+15.3
Liberal	Geoffrey Lutz	18,892	27.0	−6.5
Democrats	Brian Kidd	4,068	5.8	−3.6
Total formal votes		69,843	96.8	
Informal votes		2,304	3.2	
Turnout		72,147	95.4	
Two-party-preferred result
Labor	Harry Jenkins		70.6	+13.6
Liberal	Geoffrey Lutz		29.4	−13.6
Labor hold		Swing	+13.6	

=== Elections in the 1970s ===
==== 1977 ====
1977 Australian federal election: Scullin
Party	Candidate	Votes	%	±%
Labor	Harry Jenkins	32,303	51.8	−2.0
Liberal	Gerard Clarke	20,849	33.5	−4.7
Democrats	George Samargis	5,835	9.4	+9.4
Democratic Labor	Bernard McGrath	3,330	5.3	+0.2
Total formal votes		62,317	96.4	
Informal votes		2,314	3.6	
Turnout		64,631	96.4	
Two-party-preferred result
Labor	Harry Jenkins		57.0	+1.2
Liberal	Gerard Clarke		43.0	−1.2
Labor hold		Swing	+1.2	

==== 1975 ====
1975 Australian federal election: Scullin
Party	Candidate	Votes	%	±%
Labor	Harry Jenkins	31,307	56.3	−10.2
Liberal	Gerard Clarke	19,847	35.8	+9.9
Democratic Labor	Bernard McGrath	2,829	5.1	−0.9
Independent	Bernard Irving	1,622	2.9	+2.9
Total formal votes		55,605	97.2	
Informal votes		1,604	2.8	
Turnout		57,209	95.5	
Two-party-preferred result
Labor	Harry Jenkins		58.3	−9.8
Liberal	Gerard Clarke		41.7	+9.8
Labor hold		Swing	−9.8	

==== 1974 ====
1974 Australian federal election: Scullin
Party	Candidate	Votes	%	±%
Labor	Harry Jenkins	36,642	66.5	+4.8
Liberal	Alan Stanley	14,223	25.8	−0.4
Democratic Labor	Bernard McGrath	3,296	6.0	−6.1
Australia	John Kotre	950	1.7	+1.7
Total formal votes		55,111	97.0	
Informal votes		1,685	3.0	
Turnout		56,796	96.1	
Two-party-preferred result
Labor	Harry Jenkins		68.1	+4.3
Liberal	Alan Stanley		21.9	−4.3
Labor hold		Swing	+4.3	

==== 1972 ====
1972 Australian federal election: Scullin
Party	Candidate	Votes	%	±%
Labor	Harry Jenkins	30,815	61.7	+9.5
Liberal	Graeme McEwen	13,072	26.2	−0.9
Democratic Labor	Tom Andrews	6,027	12.1	−2.5
Total formal votes		49,914	96.9	
Informal votes		1,604	3.1	
Turnout		51,518	96.0	
Two-party-preferred result
Labor	Harry Jenkins		63.8	+6.2
Liberal	Graeme McEwen		36.2	−6.2
Labor hold		Swing	+6.2	

=== Elections in the 1960s ===
==== 1969 ====
1969 Australian federal election: Scullin
Party	Candidate	Votes	%	±%
Labor	Harry Jenkins	25,246	52.2	+3.2
Liberal	James Spicer	13,090	27.1	−4.3
Democratic Labor	Tom Andrews	7,065	14.6	−4.8
Independent	Brendon Connor	2,958	6.1	+6.1
Total formal votes		48,359	95.8	
Informal votes		2,142	4.2	
Turnout		50,501	95.8	
Two-party-preferred result
Labor	Harry Jenkins		57.6	+6.6
Liberal	James Spicer		42.4	−6.6
Labor notional hold		Swing	+6.6	

== Bibliography ==
- Australian Electoral Commission. Federal election results
- Carr, Adam. Psephos
