= Naming (parliamentary procedure) =

Temporary removal of a disruptive member in Westminster-style parliaments

Naming is a procedure in some Westminster model parliaments that provides for the speaker to temporarily remove a member of parliament who is breaking the rules of conduct of the legislature. Historically, "naming" refers to the speaker's invocation of the process by calling out the actual name of the member, deliberately breaking the convention of calling on members by the name of their constituency.

Processes to name a member are present in the lower houses of the British, Australian, Canadian, and New Zealand parliaments, and the legislatures of some Australian states and Canadian provinces. The implementation of the procedure varies by parliament, but usually requires the speaker to name a member, and then await another member to move that the offending member be disciplined according to the appropriate rules of order.

== Process ==
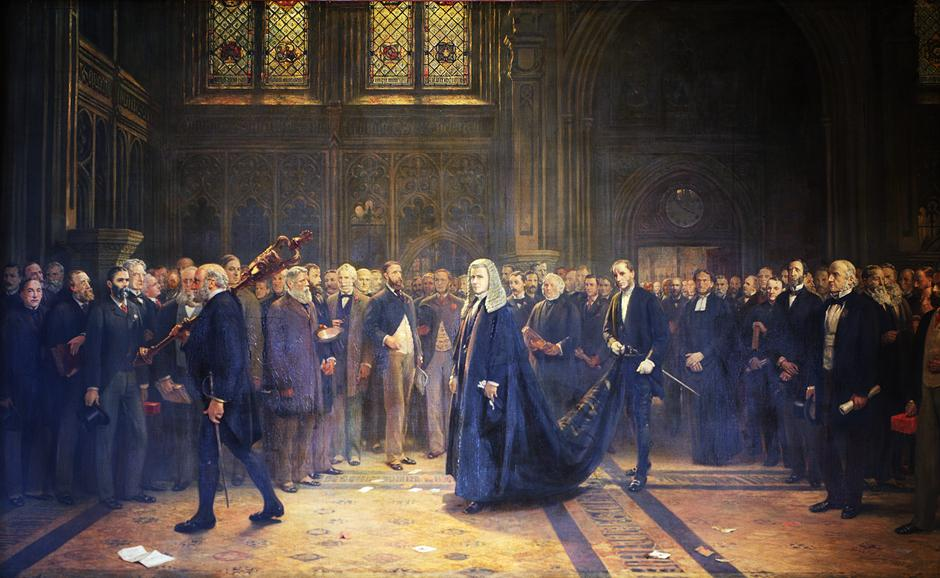
Speaker's procession in 1884

In the British House of Commons, the Speaker or one of their deputies can initiate the process by proposing a vote on the suspension of a member of the House if the speaker believes that the member has broken the rules of conduct of the House. Usually this is only done if the member has already been ordered to leave the House (which automatically leads to suspension for the remainder of that day) and refused to do so, or has committed a serious breach of conduct, and carries a suspension of up to five days and the loss of the member's salary during that period.

The procedure to name members is under Standing Order 44. Members can be suspended for the remainder of the day under Standing Order 43 (previously numbered as Standing Order 42) without debate. However, if this provision is inadequate, the Speaker or Deputy Speaker declares "I name", followed by the name of the member; and invites the Leader of the House or their deputy to move the motion that the member be removed, and then puts the question to a voice vote:

The question is that the honourable member be suspended from the services of the House. As many as are of that opinion say 'Aye', of the contrary 'No'.

A division is not normally required since MPs will usually back the speaker's judgement. However, when John McDonnell was named by deputy speaker Alan Haselhurst on 15 January 2009 for disturbing the mace, a division was called because George Galloway and other members declared themselves with the Noes. A vote on the suspension was not held as no MPs were willing to act as tellers for the Noes.

In the Australian House of Representatives, the procedure to name members is under Standing Order 94. Under Standing Order 94a, the Speaker can order the immediate removal of a member for one hour, which is not open to a division; this standing order was introduced in 1994 and was known as Standing Order 304a until 2004, when it was renamed to 94a. This standing order was introduced as a mechanism for the Speaker to quickly eject disorderly members without taking up the time of the house for a division, which was the case prior to 1994. If a member is named under Standing Order 94b, the removal is dependent on a vote. If a member is named, the Speaker declares, "I name", followed by the Electoral Division of the member, and then the Leader of the House moves the question:

That the member for (division) be suspended from the service of the House.

If the vote passes by a simple majority, then the member is required to leave the house for 24 hours, with more severe penalties if the member has been named beforehand in the same calendar year.

In the House of Commons of Canada, the Speaker's authority to remove members is listed under Standing Order 11. A member named by the Speaker, without debate, is required to leave the House immediately and prohibited from returning for the remainder of the day's sitting. Alternatively, the Speaker may suggest to the House the removal of a member for a specific period of time, which requires a motion to receive a majority vote on the House floor. Although the removal of members was increasingly common through the 20th century, usage of the procedure has since declined, having only been used eight times since 2000. The order to remove a member generally requires an act of defiance against the Speaker, as the removal of a member is usually justified by the generic reasoning that the member is "disregarding the authority of the Chair".

The procedure has also been used once in the Massachusetts Senate. On 27 October 1981, Senate President William M. Bulger named Senator Alan Sisitsky after Sisitsky continuously disrupted the Senate proceedings. Sisitsky was then removed from the Senate Chamber by a court officer. The matter was referred to the Senate Ethics Committee, which recommended that Sisitsky be suspended indefinitely until he issued a formal apology to the Senate.

== Lists of namings ==
=== House of Commons (United Kingdom) ===
Date	Speaker	Member	Party	Reason
3 February 1881	Sir Henry Brand	John Dillon, Charles Stewart Parnell, James Lysaght Finegan, John Barry, Joseph Biggar, Garrett Byrne, William Corbet, John Daly, Charles Dawson, Thomas Patrick Gill, Edmund Dwyer Gray, Timothy Michael Healy, Richard Lalor, Edmund Leamy, James Leahy, Justin McCarthy, James Carlile McCoan, Edward Marum, Robert Henry Metge, Isaac Nelson, Arthur O'Connor, Thomas Power O'Connor, Daniel O'Donoghue, James Patrick Mahon, William Henry O'Sullivan, John O'Connor Power, John Redmond, Thomas Sexton, Alexander Martin Sullivan, Timothy Daniel Sullivan, Bernard Charles Molloy, James Joseph O'Kelly, Frank Hugh O'Donnell, Richard Power, Richard O'Shaughnessy	Home Rule	A mass ejection of Irish MPs who caused uproar in the House after hearing Michael Davitt had been arrested. Dillon was named for repeatedly trying to ask an overruled point of order. Parnell, Finegan, O'Kelly and O'Donnell were named for proposing William Ewart Gladstone no longer be heard during the debate. The rest were named for refusing to attend the divisions to object the members. No second teller appeared for the division for Callan so the "aye" voice vote was held. All refused to leave after being named and were ejected by the Serjeant-at-Arms, except Molloy who had already left the House.
24 February 1885	Arthur Peel	William O'Brien	Irish Parliamentary	
28 July 1887	Arthur Peel	Timothy Michael Healy	Irish Parliamentary	For having threatened violence against another member who had interrupted his speech in committee.
19 July 1888	Arthur Peel	Charles Conybeare	Liberal	For stating the Barrow Drainage Bills were a public scandal.
4 May 1892	Arthur Peel	Robert Bontine Cunninghame Graham	Liberal	For interrupting a speech to call it, as well as companies and their directors, "swindling".
15 August 1895	William Gully	Charles Kearns Deane Tanner	Irish Parliamentary	For calling the claim by hecklers that "They ran away from [Home Rule]" a lie, and refusing to withdraw the comment.
5 March 1901	James Lowther / William Gully	Eugene Crean, Patrick McHugh, Patrick White, John Cullinan, Patrick Doogan, Anthony Donelan, William Abraham, James Gilhooly, William Lundon, Thomas McGovern, Jeremiah Jordan	Irish Parliamentary	For refusing to leave their seats for a division, in protest against no Irish members having been called to speak in the debate. They were ejected by the Deputy Serjeant-at-Arms. (Today, refusing to enter either of the division lobbies is simply interpreted as abstention.)
30 March 1908	Deputy Speaker	John O'Connor	Irish Parliamentary	For calling George Clark "a coward, and a cad". Named but no division held as he left the House.
16 October 1908	Alfred Emmott / James Lowther	Victor Grayson	Ind. Labour Party	For repeatedly trying to ask an overruled point of order.
1 July 1918	James Lowther	Noel Pemberton Billing	Independent	For repeatedly trying to ask an overruled point of order. The sitting was suspended until the Serjeant-at-Arms ejected him.
1 December 1925	James Hope	William Murdoch Adamson	Labour	For repeatedly trying to ask an overruled point of order.
22 April 1937	Sir Dennis Herbert / Edward FitzRoy	Aneurin Bevan	Labour	For refusing to withdraw his comment to Sir Dennis Herbert that "your conduct has been abominable".
18 July 1949	Francis Bowles / Douglas Clifton Brown	Ellis Smith	Labour	For repeatedly trying to ask on what basis speakers had been selected during the debate.
27 November 1951	Hopkin Morris / William Morrison	Sydney Silverman	Labour	For repeatedly challenging the ruling of the Deputy Speaker to accept a closure motion.
26 March 1952	Charles MacAndrew / William Morrison	Bessie Braddock	Labour	For refusing to resume her seat in protest that she had not been called in a debate on the textile industry, and refusing to withdraw when the Deputy Speaker asked her to do so.
16 November 1981	George Thomas	Ian Paisley, Peter Robinson, John McQuade	DUP	For repeatedly disrupting a statement by James Prior. The sitting was suspended for ten minutes, the members were named, and the sitting was again suspended while they were ejected by force.
26 May 1982	George Thomas	Andrew Faulds	Labour	For persistently trying to ask an overruled point of order.
2 May 1984	Bernard Weatherill	Tam Dalyell	Labour	For accusing Margaret Thatcher of lying.
17 July 1984	Bernard Weatherill	Dennis Skinner	Labour	For refusing to withdraw his comment that Margaret Thatcher would bribe judges.
31 July 1984	Bernard Weatherill	Martin Flannery	Labour	For refusing to withdraw his words "one of Margaret Thatcher's tame Tory judges".
11 November 1985	Bernard Weatherill	Brian Sedgemore	Labour	For refusing to withdraw his accusation of Geoffrey Howe "perverting the course of justice".
12 November 1987	Bernard Weatherill	Tam Dalyell	Labour	For refusing to withdraw his accusation that Margaret Thatcher had lied.
25 January 1988	Bernard Weatherill	Ken Livingstone	Labour	For refusing to withdraw his accusation of Patrick Mayhew being an "accomplice to murder".
18 February 1988	Bernard Weatherill	Harry Cohen	Labour	For persistently requesting Christopher Chope give way after being refused.
15 March 1988	Harold Walker	Alex Salmond	SNP	For interrupting Nigel Lawson's 1988 budget over income tax.
13 April 1988	Bernard Weatherill	Dave Nellist	Labour	For persistently trying to ask an overruled point of order.
25 July 1988	Bernard Weatherill	Tam Dalyell	Labour	For refusing to withdraw his accusation that Margaret Thatcher had lied.
14 March 1989	Bernard Weatherill	Jim Sillars	SNP	For persistently trying to ask an overruled point of order.
24 July 1989	Bernard Weatherill	Tam Dalyell	Labour	For refusing to withdraw his accusation that Margaret Thatcher had lied.
23 July 1990	Bernard Weatherill	Dick Douglas	Labour	For persistently trying to ask an overruled point of order.
29 November 1993	Betty Boothroyd	Ian Paisley	DUP	For refusing to withdraw the word "falsehood" during a debate with the Secretary of State for Northern Ireland Sir Patrick Mayhew. The Speaker had first tried to remove Paisley under Standing Order 42.
8 December 2005	Michael Martin	Dennis Skinner	Labour	For refusing to withdraw his remark that "The only thing growing [in the 1970s and a lot of the 1980s] were the lines of coke in front of boy George and the rest of them", aimed at Shadow Chancellor George Osborne.
20 April 2006	Sir Alan Haselhurst/Michael Martin	Dennis Skinner	Labour	For refusing to withdraw his remark that Theresa May was being let off with having stated Tony Blair had misled the House, because she is a Conservative.
23 July 2007	Michael Martin	George Galloway	Respect	For questioning the integrity of MPs investigating whether he took money from Iraq, and challenging the authority of the speaker when told to back down on his accusations.
15 January 2009	Sir Alan Haselhurst/Michael Martin	John McDonnell	Labour	For manhandling the parliamentary mace.
18 September 2012	John Bercow	Paul Flynn	Labour	For refusing to withdraw his accusation that ministers had lied during a statement from Philip Hammond regarding the suspension by NATO of joint operations with Afghan security forces.
16 December 2020	Dame Rosie Winterton/Sir Lindsay Hoyle	Drew Hendry	SNP	For disruptive shouting at the end of a debate on the United Kingdom Internal Market Bill and then attempting to remove the parliamentary mace from the chamber.
13 July 2022	Lindsay Hoyle	Neale Hanvey and Kenny MacAskill	Alba	For disrupting the start of Prime Minister's questions by standing and attempting to make a point of order.
20 April 2026	Lindsay Hoyle	Zarah Sultana	Your Party	For disregarding the authority of the chair by refusing his order to leave the chamber after calling Keir Starmer a "bare-faced liar".

=== Canada ===
==== House of Commons ====
Bold denotes an MP who was a party leader at the time they were named.

Date	Speaker	Member	Party	Reason
15 March 1913	Thomas Simpson Sproule	Michael Clark	Liberal	Refusing to come to order and "flagrantly violating the rules of the House". The House did not suspend him.
24 March 1942	James Allison Glen	Liguori Lacombe	Independent Liberal	Refusing to sit down, and insulting George Stanley White.
4 July 1944	James Allison Glen	Liguori Lacombe	Independent Liberal	Repeatedly interrupting other members.
31 July 1944	James Allison Glen	Herbert Alexander Bruce	National Government	Accusing prime minister Mackenzie King of bribery, and refusing to withdraw it.
25 May 1956	Louis-René Beaudoin	Donald Fleming	Progressive Conservative	Refusing to come to order during a committee meeting.
10 February 1961	Roland Michener	Frank Howard	Co-operative Commonwealth Federation	Referring to the actions of John Diefenbaker and veterans affairs minister Gordon Churchill as "scurrilous and underhanded", and accusing them of having "sinister motives", and refusing to withdraw.
16 March 1962	Roland Michener	Alexis Caron	Liberal	Accusing a committee chair of partiality, and refusing to withdraw.
5 October 1962	Marcel Lambert	Bernard Dumont	Social Credit	Refusing to sit down.
19 June 1964	Alan Macnaughton	Alvin Hamilton	Progressive Conservative	Accusing Lester Pearson of lying, and refusing to withdraw.
16 May 1978	James Jerome	Roch La Salle	Progressive Conservative	Referring to finance minister Jean Chrétien as a "liar", and refusing to withdraw.
21 March 1979	James Jerome	Thomas Cossitt	Progressive Conservative	Accusing Pierre Trudeau of lying to the House, and refusing to withdraw.
23 February 1981	Lloyd Francis (Deputy)	Otto Jelinek	Progressive Conservative	Repeatedly accusing Pierre Trudeau of lying and refusing to withdraw.
3 December 1981	Jeanne Sauvé	Thomas Cossitt	Progressive Conservative	Accusing public works minister Paul Cosgrove of lying, and refusing to withdraw.
19 May 1982	Jeanne Sauvé	John Crosbie	Progressive Conservative	Referring to justice minister Jean Chrétien as a "liar", and refusing to withdraw multiple accusations of deception.
16 June 1982	Jeanne Sauvé	Svend Robinson	New Democratic	Accusing justice minister Jean Chrétien of lying to the House, and refusing to withdraw.
24 March 1983	Roderick Blaker (acting)	Lorne Greenaway	Progressive Conservative	Referring to agriculture minister Eugene Whelan as a "hypocrite", and refusing to withdraw.
20 May 1983	Lloyd Francis (Deputy)	**Ed Broadbent**	New Democratic	Accusing Pierre Trudeau of lying, and refusing to withdraw.
19 October 1983	Jeanne Sauvé	Svend Robinson	New Democratic	Accusing the Speaker of colluding with transport minister Lloyd Axworthy, and refusing to withdraw.
31 October 1983	Lloyd Francis (acting)	Ian Deans	New Democratic	Refusing to sit down.
25 May 1984	Jacques Guilbault (acting)	Lyle Kristiansen	New Democratic	Refusing to withdraw allegations that Pierre Trudeau, Jean-Jacques Blais, and Allan MacEachen had lied to the House.
8 June 1984	Lloyd Francis	Dan Heap	New Democratic	Accusing acting prime minister Jean-Luc Pépin of lying to the House, and refusing to withdraw.
17 December 1984	John Bosley	**Ed Broadbent**	New Democratic	Accusing Brian Mulroney of lying to the House, and refusing to withdraw.
19 December 1984	John Bosley	Jean-Claude Malépart	Liberal	Saying that Brian Mulroney "never tells the truth", and refusing to withdraw.
22 May 1985	John Bosley	Jean-Claude Malépart	Liberal	Challenging the Speaker to name him after refusing to sit down.
19 June 1985	John Bosley	Brian Tobin	Liberal	Accusing Brian Mulroney of lying to the House, and refusing to withdraw.
27 June 1985	John Bosley	John Nunziata	Liberal	Displaying an offensive prop to the House while another member was speaking. The item itself was not described in the parliamentary record.
11 October 1985	John Bosley	John Rodriguez	New Democratic	Refusing to sit down.
24 February 1986	John Bosley	James Fulton	New Democratic	Accusing deputy prime minister Erik Nielsen of lying, and refusing to withdraw.
23 April 1986	John Bosley	John Rodriguez	New Democratic	Refusing to yield the floor.
21 May 1986	John Bosley	Warren Allmand	Liberal	Accusing junior minister Andrée Champagne of lying to the House, and refusing to withdraw.
28 May 1986	John Bosley	**Ed Broadbent**	New Democratic	Accusing Brian Mulroney of lying, and refusing to withdraw.
11 June 1986	John Bosley	Sergio Marchi	Liberal	Refusing to come to order, and accusing Brian Mulroney of lying to the House.
24 March 1993	John Allen Fraser	Dave Barrett	New Democratic	Accusing junior minister Harvie Andre of lying to a House committee, and refusing to withdraw.
30 September 1994	Gilbert Parent	Gaston Leroux	Bloc Québécois	Accusing Jean Chrétien of lying to the House, and refusing to withdraw.
29 May 1995	Gilbert Parent	Jake Hoeppner	Reform	Accusing government house leader Herb Gray of lying to him, and refusing to withdraw.
2 November 1995	Gilbert Parent	**Gilles Duceppe**	Bloc Québécois	Accusing deputy prime minister Sheila Copps of lying to the House, and refusing to withdraw.
2 November 1995	Gilbert Parent	Michel Bellehumeur	Bloc Québécois	Accusing deputy prime minister Sheila Copps of lying to the House, and refusing to withdraw.
24 April 1996	Gilbert Parent	Randy White	Reform	Referring to Jean Chrétien's statement as a "bold faced lie", and refusing to withdraw.
12 February 1997	Gilbert Parent	Chuck Strahl	Reform	Accusing Jean Chrétien of covering up the inquiry into the Somalia Affair, and refusing to withdraw.
1 October 1997	Gilbert Parent	Svend Robinson	New Democratic	Accusing fisheries minister David Anderson of treason, and refusing to withdraw.
1 December 1998	Gilbert Parent	Michel Gauthier	Bloc Québécois	Referring to Jean Chrétien as a hypocrite, and refusing to withdraw.
15 February 2000	Gilbert Parent	Jim Abbott	Reform	Accusing human resources minister Jane Stewart of lying, and refusing to withdraw.
5 April 2000	Gilbert Parent	Suzanne Tremblay	Bloc Québécois	Ordering Bonnie Brown to "stop lying", and refusing to withdraw.
6 December 2002	Bob Kilger (Deputy)	Yvan Loubier	Bloc Québécois	Repeatedly calling agriculture minister Lyle Vanclief a "liar", and refusing to withdraw.
30 November 2017	Geoff Regan	Blake Richards	Conservative	Refusing to come to order after being warned for shouting at finance minister Bill Morneau mid-speech.
17 June 2020	Anthony Rota	**Jagmeet Singh**	New Democratic	Calling Bloc Québécois MP Alain Therrien a 'racist', and refusing to withdraw.
8 December 2022	Anthony Rota	Raquel Dancho	Conservative	Yelled "you're lying" at Liberal MP Vance Badawey, and refusing to apologize.
7 December 2023	Chris d'Entremont (acting)	Damien Kurek	Conservative	Accusing Justin Trudeau of lying, and refusing to withdraw.
30 April 2024	Greg Fergus	Rachael Thomas	Conservative	Referring to the Speaker's handling of the House as "disgraceful." The remark was withdrawn, but the Speaker claimed to not hear her.
30 April 2024	Greg Fergus	**Pierre Poilievre**	Conservative	Referring to Justin Trudeau as a "practicing racist," a "wacko," and an "extremist," and refusing to withdraw.

==== Senate ====
Date	Speaker	Member	Party	Reason
19 February 1998	Gildas Molgat	Andrew Thompson	Liberal	Failed to comply with an order to present himself in the Senate in order to explain his extensive record of truancy.
5 November 2013	Noël Kinsella	Patrick Brazeau	Independent Conservative	Participation in the Canadian Senate expenses scandal.
5 November 2013	Noël Kinsella	Mike Duffy	Independent	Participation in the Canadian Senate expenses scandal.
5 November 2013	Noël Kinsella	Pamela Wallin	Independent Conservative	Participation in the Canadian Senate expenses scandal.

==== Legislative Assembly of Ontario ====
Date	Speaker	Member	Party	Reason
20 November 2025	Donna Skelly	Marit Stiles	New Democratic	For refusing to withdraw the word “corrupt”.

=== Australia ===
==== House of Representatives ====
Date	Speaker	Member	Party	Reason
14 May 1964	John McLeay	Tom Uren	Labor	For repeatedly interrupting despite warnings and calling Attorney General Billy Snedden a liar.
29 March 1966	John McLeay	Jim Cairns	Labor	For repeatedly interrupting to insist that South Vietnam was not a member of the United Nations.
27 September 1966	Acting Speaker	Allan Fraser	Labor	For repeatedly interrupting to insist the United States was responsible for a bombing in South Vietnam.
28 September 1966	Acting Speaker	Len Reynolds	Labor	For calling the lack of benefits for Australian Boer War and World War I veterans "a disgrace to servicemen who have served their country" and "a sell-out of the servicemen of World War I".
14 October 1966	John McLeay	Charles Jones	Labor	For calling Prime Minister Harold Holt "a dirty low guttersnipe" and refusing to withdraw the remark.
3 October 1967	William Aston	Jim Cope	Labor	For telling Philip Stokes to "shut up" and refusing to withdraw the remark.
24 September 1970	William Aston	Rex Patterson	Labor	For saying Peter Nixon "made a lie" and refusing to withdraw the remark unreservedly.
28 October 1970	William Aston	Bill Hayden	Labor	For repeatedly insisting that Billy Snedden was not answering his question.
20 April 1971	William Aston	Tom Uren	Labor	For repeatedly interrupting and asking Prime Minister William McMahon "Is your name Popov the clown?" during a discussion of Australia's relations with the USSR.
5 April 1973	Jim Cope	Peter Nixon	National	For telling Prime Minister Gough Whitlam "you should be ashamed of yourself" over accusations of lying to the Yugoslav government and refusing to withdraw the remark.
5 April 1973	Jim Cope	John Gorton	Liberal	For telling Speaker Jim Cope "you ought to be ashamed of yourself" for naming Peter Nixon.
5 April 1973	Jim Cope	Jim Forbes	Liberal	For saying "that is disgraceful" regarding the naming of John Gorton.
17 September 1974	Jim Cope	Bill Wentworth	Liberal	For shouting over the speaker and refusing to apologize.
25 February 1975	Jim Cope	Doug Anthony	National	For repeatedly interjecting during a discussion of the cattle industry.
5 June 1975	Gordon Scholes	Bill Wentworth	Liberal	For asking Prime Minister Gough Whitlam "Would you like to wash your hands, Mr Prime Minister?" during a discussion of Australia admitting very few Vietnamese refugees.
9 October 1975	Gordon Scholes	Ian Sinclair	National	For arguing with the speaker over whether there was a point of order.
18 November 1976	Billy Snedden	Charles Jones	Labor	For calling Phillip Lynch a dingo and arguing with the speaker.
22 September 1977	Billy Snedden	Bob Katter Sr.	National	For calling Opposition Leader Bill Hayden a liar and refusing to withdraw.
6 June 1979	Acting Speaker	John Dawkins	Labor	For accusing the Chair of "bias" and refusing to withdraw.
6 June 1979	Acting Speaker	Keith Johnson	Labor	For arguing with the chair.
23 April 1980	Billy Snedden	Brian Howe	Labor	For calling Andrew Peacock a liar and arguing with the speaker.
11 September 1980	Billy Snedden	John Dawkins	Labor	Reflecting on the chair, accusing the Speaker of enforcing "Liberal Party standing orders".
18 September 1980	Billy Snedden	Paul Keating	Labor	For saying Prime Minister Malcolm Fraser "could not lie straight in bed and his word cannot be believed or taken any notice of".
30 April 1981	Billy Snedden	John Scott	Labor	For interjecting upon Prime Minister Malcolm Fraser
27 August 1981	Billy Snedden	Les Johnson	Labor	For interrupting the speaker over a point of order which had been denied.
6 May 1982	Billy Snedden	Paul Keating	Labor	For repeatedly interjecting that Prime Minister Malcolm Fraser had falsified information related to the budget, adding "you would name me to protect this stinking, corrupt Government."
7 September 1982	Billy Snedden	Michael Duffy	Labor	For interjecting repeatedly on Treasurer John Howard.
10 November 1982	Billy Snedden	Dick Klugman	Labor	For refusing to withdraw reflections made on members of a parliamentary committee
12 October 1983	Harry Jenkins Sr.	Stephen Lusher	National	For repeatedly interjecting on Minister of Finance John Dawkins.
16 November 1983	Acting Speaker	Ken Aldred	Liberal	For repeatedly interjecting to criticize Prime Minister Bob Hawke's support of a casino in Canberra and suggesting he was colluding with the developers.
29 May 1984	Harry Jenkins Sr.	John Howard	Liberal	For interjecting repeatedly on Minister of Finance John Dawkins.
28 March 1985	Harry Jenkins Sr.	Ken Aldred	Liberal	For repeatedly interjecting during a question on Australia not participating in the Strategic Defense Initiative.
18 April 1985	Harry Jenkins Sr.	Ian Cameron	National	"For again interjecting after having been warned by the Chair." Cameron had interjected during a response about a rugby tour in South Africa to say "What about Queensland?" and interjected again to say "well, he cannot go to Queensland."
11 September 1985	Harry Jenkins Sr.	Wilson Tuckey	Liberal	Tuckey said to Trade Minister John Dawkins "You are a tax fraud. You are a tax cheat." After being named by the Speaker, Tuckey said "The only people the honourable member beats are innocent Aborigines," and the Speaker reiterated his naming of Tuckey.
13 February 1986	Joan Child	Ken Aldred	Liberal	
28 May 1986	Joan Child	Wilson Tuckey	Liberal	
21 August 1986	Joan Child	Ian Sinclair	National	
18 September 1986	Joan Child	Neil Brown	Liberal	
24 September 1986	Deputy Speaker	John Howard	Liberal	For "disregarding the authority of the chair"; this was the only instance of a Leader of the Opposition being removed from the chamber until Tony Abbott was removed under standing order 94a in 2012.
17 October 1986	Joan Child	Paul Everingham	Country Liberal	
22 October 1986	Joan Child	Ken Aldred	Liberal	
23 February 1987	Joan Child	Wilson Tuckey	Liberal	
17 March 1987	Deputy Speaker	Michael Hodgman	Liberal	
26 April 1988	Deputy Speaker	Bruce Goodluck	Liberal	
18 May 1988	Joan Child	Wilson Tuckey	Liberal	
3 November 1988	Acting Speaker	John Spender	Liberal	
23 November 1988	Joan Child	Neil Brown	Liberal	
8 March 1989	Joan Child	Ian Sinclair	National	
24 May 1989	Acting Speaker	Wilson Tuckey	Liberal	
6 September 1989	Leo McLeay	Wilson Tuckey	Liberal	
23 November 1989	Leo McLeay	Lewis Kent	Labor	
18 October 1990	Acting Speaker	Wilson Tuckey	Liberal	
15 November 1990	Leo McLeay	Michael Cobb	National	
19 February 1991	Leo McLeay	Neil Brown	Liberal	
20 February 1991	Leo McLeay	Fred Chaney	Liberal	
16 May 1991	Leo McLeay	Wilson Tuckey	Liberal	
26 November 1991	Leo McLeay	Russell Broadbent	Liberal	
31 March 1992	Leo McLeay	Ken Aldred	Liberal	
2 April 1992	Leo McLeay	Alexander Downer	Liberal	
3 June 1992	Leo McLeay	John Howard	Liberal	
17 September 1992	Deputy Speaker	Wilson Tuckey	Liberal	
8 October 1992	Leo McLeay	John Sharp	National	
13 October 1992	Leo McLeay	Fred Chaney	Liberal	
10 November 1992	Leo McLeay	Philip Ruddock	Liberal	
31 August 1993	Deputy Speaker	Colin Hollis	Labor	"For calling attention to the want of a quorum when a quorum was present."
1 September 1993	Stephen Martin	Alexander Downer	Liberal	"For continuing to interject after having been warned by the Chair."
7 October 1993	Stephen Martin	Peter Reith	Liberal	"For disorderly conduct."
27 October 1993	Stephen Martin	Peter McGauran	National	"For defying the Chair."
25 November 1993	Stephen Martin	Peter McGauran	National	"For continuing to interject after having been warned by the Chair."
2 June 1994	Stephen Martin	Peter Slipper	Liberal	"For not resuming his seat when requested to do so by the Speaker."
2 February 1995	Stephen Martin	Peter Slipper	Liberal	"For continuing to interject after having been warned by the Chair."
6 February 1995	Stephen Martin	Peter McGauran	National	"For continuing to interject after having been warned by the Chair."
30 May 1995	Deputy Speaker	Wilson Tuckey	Liberal	"For defying the Chair"
22 June 1995	Stephen Martin	Peter Slipper	Liberal	"For continuing to interject after having been warned by the Chair."
31 August 1995	Stephen Martin	Lou Lieberman	Liberal	"For not resuming his seat when requested to do so by the Speaker."
15 October 1996	Bob Halverson	Stephen Martin	Labor	"For refusing to resume his seat when directed to do so by the Chair."
31 October 1996	Bob Halverson	Simon Crean	Labor	"For not withdrawing from the Chamber immediately."
10 December 1996	Bob Halverson	De-Anne Kelly	National	During a division on amendments to the Euthanasia Laws Bill Nationals MP De-Anne Kelly and Liberal MP Jackie Kelly attempted to leave the chamber as the doors were being locked in order to abstain; having remained in the chamber the members refused to take their seats with the 'Ayes' or 'Noes' against the Speaker's direction, and were subsequently named following the division.
10 December 1996	Bob Halverson	Jackie Kelly	Liberal	See above
5 February 1997	Bob Halverson	Leo McLeay	Labor	"For refusing to resume his seat when directed to do so by the Chair."
6 March 1997	Bob Halverson	Martin Ferguson	Labor	"For refusing to resume his seat when directed to do so by the Chair."
18 March 1997	Bob Halverson	Gavan O'Connor	Labor	"Having again interjected" after "continuing to interject after a general warning had been given by the Chair."
23 September 1997	Deputy Speaker	Simon Crean	Labor	"for disregarding the authority of the Chair"
18 November 1997	Bob Halverson	Joel Fitzgibbon	Labor	"For not withdrawing from the chamber immediately" after "again raising a frivolous point of order."
2 April 1998	Ian Sinclair	Simon Crean	Labor	"For disorderly conduct".
2 April 1998	Ian Sinclair	Martin Ferguson	Labor	"For refusing to withdraw an objectionable remark when directed to do so by the Chair."
11 March 1999	Neil Andrew	Leo McLeay	Labor	"For continuing to interject after a warning had been given from the chair".
7 June 1999	Neil Andrew	Warren Snowdon	Labor	"Having reflected on the Chair."
16 March 2000	Neil Andrew	Leo McLeay	Labor	"For continuing to interject"
10 October 2000	Neil Andrew	Arch Bevis	Labor	"For continuing to interject after a general warning had been given by the Chair."
29 November 2000	Neil Andrew	Julia Irwin	Labor	"For defying the Chair."
7 February 2001	Neil Andrew	Leo McLeay	Labor	"For continuing to interject after a warning had been given from the Chair", and "having again interjected".
8 February 2001	Neil Andrew	Wayne Swan	Labor	"Disorderly behaviour in Committee"
1 March 2001	Deputy Speaker	Cheryl Kernot	Labor	"Having again interjected and reflected on the Chair."
6 June 2001	Neil Andrew	Dick Adams	Labor	"For reflecting on the chair"
23 August 2001	Deputy Speaker	Lindsay Tanner	Labor	"For refusing to withdraw an unparliamentary expression when requested to do so." Tanner had said, directed at the Minister for Finance and Administration, "you are a liar."
20 September 2001	Neil Andrew	David Cox	Labor	"For disorderly behaviour."
21 March 2002	Neil Andrew	Anthony Albanese	Labor	"The Deputy Speaker reported that he had been required to adjourn the meeting of the Main Committee (on the previous day), in accordance with the provisions of standing order 282 because of disorder arising in the Committee. He further reported that the Member for Grayndler (Mr Albanese) had persisted in disorderly behaviour by refusing to withdraw a remark after being called to order and thus defied the Chair of the Main Committee."
28 May 2002	Neil Andrew	Martin Ferguson	Labor	"For continuing to interject after having been warned by the Chair."
4 June 2002	Neil Andrew	Warren Snowdon	Labor	"For continuing to interject."
10 December 2002	Neil Andrew	Joel Fitzgibbon	Labor	"For continuing to interject."
6 March 2003	Neil Andrew	Mark Latham	Labor	"For continuing to interject after having been warned by the Chair."
6 March 2003	Neil Andrew	Wayne Swan	Labor	"For defying the Chair."
20 March 2003	Neil Andrew	Craig Emerson	Labor	"For defying the Chair."
13 May 2003	Neil Andrew	Wayne Swan	Labor	"For continuing to interject after a warning had been given by the chair."
20 August 2003	Neil Andrew	Dick Adams	Labor	"For reflecting on the chair during the preceding division".
13 October 2003	Neil Andrew	Christian Zahra	Labor	"For continuing to interject after a warning had been given by the chair".
23 October 2003	Neil Andrew	Senator Bob Brown & Senator Kerry Nettle	Greens	"Continually interjecting over President George W. Bush's speech to the Australian Parliament." During a joint sitting of both the House of Representatives and Senate, Brown and Nettle were named by the Speaker of the House after the President and Prime Minister John Howard had left the chamber.
9 March 2004	Neil Andrew	Alan Griffin	Labor	"For disorderly behaviour."
24 March 2004	Neil Andrew	Anthony Albanese	Labor	"For disorderly behaviour in the process of withdrawing from the House."
1 June 2004	Neil Andrew	Harry Quick	Labor	"For defying the Chair." The member named had brought Tasmanian apples into the chamber to protest against the import of New Zealand apples susceptible to fireblight.
11 August 2004	Neil Andrew	Julia Irwin	Labor	"For defying the Chair."
17 August 2005	Deputy Speaker	Tony Windsor	Independent	"For refusing to withdraw offensive remarks"
31 May 2006	David Hawker	Julia Gillard	Labor	"For having moved closure of Member (Tony Abbott) containing unparliamentary terms and having refused to withdraw unconditionally"
9 August 2006	David Hawker	Gavan O'Connor	Labor	"For not withdrawing immediately and defying the Chair."
6 September 2006	David Hawker	Wayne Swan	Labor	"For being disorderly upon withdrawing."
1 November 2006	Deputy Speaker	Anthony Albanese	Labor	"For defying the chair".
14 February 2007	David Hawker	Arch Bevis	Labor	"For highly disorderly behaviour."
19 September 2007	David Hawker	Lindsay Tanner	Labor	"For defying the Chair."
20 September 2007	David Hawker	Anthony Albanese	Labor	"For defying the Chair," saying to the speaker, "you are an embarrassment."
22 February 2008	Harry Jenkins	Steven Ciobo	Liberal	"For defying the Chair"
22 February 2008	Deputy Speaker	Luke Hartsuyker	National	"For defying the chair"
28 May 2008	Harry Jenkins	Wilson Tuckey	Liberal	"For defying the Chair" after "continuing to interject after a warning had been given from the Chair."
25 September 2008	Harry Jenkins	Barry Haase	Liberal	"For defying the Chair."
12 November 2008	Harry Jenkins	Wilson Tuckey	Liberal	"For defying the Chair."
26 May 2009	Harry Jenkins	Christopher Pyne	Liberal	"For interjecting and disorderly behaviour."
28 May 2009	Harry Jenkins	Stuart Robert	Liberal	"For disorderly conduct when directed to leave."
18 June 2009	Harry Jenkins	Dennis Jensen	Liberal	
19 August 2009	Harry Jenkins	Barry Haase	Liberal	"For defying the chair."
14 September 2009	Harry Jenkins	Tony Abbott	Liberal	"For defying the chair."
17 September 2009	Harry Jenkins	Scott Morrison	Liberal	"For disorderly behavior," relating to photographs shown by Anthony Albanese.
26 November 2009	Harry Jenkins	Peter Lindsay	Liberal	"For continuing to interject after having been directed to leave the Chamber."
25 February 2010	Harry Jenkins	Andrew Laming	Liberal	"For continuing to interject after having been directed to leave the Chamber."
18 March 2010	Harry Jenkins	Paul Fletcher	Liberal	"For continuing to interject after having been directed to leave the Chamber."
23 March 2011	Harry Jenkins	Christopher Pyne	Liberal	For repeatedly interjecting after being warned.
31 May 2011	Harry Jenkins	Bob Baldwin	Liberal	For continuing to interject after having been warned. Named negatived, motion to keep confidence in the Speaker accepted.
15 June 2011	Harry Jenkins	Luke Hartsuyker	National	For repeatedly interjecting after being warned.
11 October 2011	Deputy Speaker	Sophie Mirabella	Liberal	Refusing to resume seat after being asked to.
22 March 2012	Peter Slipper	Darren Chester	National	For being present in the public gallery after being removed from the house for one hour under Standing Order 94a.
27 March 2014	Bronwyn Bishop	Mark Dreyfus	Labor	For repeatedly interjecting after being warned.
23 June 2014	Bronwyn Bishop	Wayne Swan	Labor	For repeatedly interjecting.
17 July 2014	Bronwyn Bishop	Ed Husic	Labor	For repeatedly interjecting. Having been asked to leave quickly, Husic said "I'll be quicker than Warren's answer," at which point he was named.
11 February 2015	Bronwyn Bishop	Mark Dreyfus	Labor	For repeatedly interjecting to object to Foreign Minister Julie Bishop's use of props.
26 February 2015	Bronwyn Bishop	Jim Chalmers	Labor	“For defying the chair”
25 March 2015	Bronwyn Bishop	Andrew Laming	Liberal	Introducing flammable materials into the Federation Chamber
25 June 2015	Bronwyn Bishop	Mark Dreyfus	Labor	“For defying the chair”
17 March 2016	Tony Smith	Wayne Swan	Labor	Refusing to comply with an order to withdraw certain words used to accuse Christian Porter of lying.
24 July 2019	Tony Smith	Nick Champion	Labor	For arguing with the chair about how rule 94(a) should be used for and against him.
26 August 2021	Tony Smith	Julian Hill	Labor	For disorderly conduct as he was leaving the House, contrary to rule 94(a).
25 May 2026	Milton Dick	Phillip Thompson	Liberal National	Refusing to comply with an order to withdraw a statement accusing the Australian Labor Party of lying.
30 June 2026	Milton Dick	Garth Hamilton	Liberal National	"For gross disorder" in swearing at Kristy McBain and storming out of the chamber.

==== Senate ====
Date	President	Member	Party	Reason
1 November 1912	Harry Turley	Arthur Rae	Labor	For refusing to withdraw a statement accusing Edward Millen of lying.
27 November 2024	Sue Lines	Lidia Thorpe	Independent	For highly disorderly conduct in throwing paper at Pauline Hanson during debate earlier in the sitting day.
24 November 2025	Sue Lines	Pauline Hanson	One Nation	For engaging in behaviour in the chamber that was intended to vilify and mock people on the basis of their religion, refusing to obey the ruling of the chair, and refusing to comply with the Senate’s order and leave the chamber, requiring the sitting of the Senate to be suspended. She was censured and suspended the next day for 7 sitting days.

=== New Zealand ===
==== House of Representatives ====
Date	Speaker	Member	Party	Reason	Ref.
15 November 1887	Maurice O'Rorke	Julius Vogel	Independent	Saying that Robert Thompson was 'want of manners' and refusing to withdraw his statement.	
27 October 1898	Maurice O'Rorke at the request of Arthur Guinness, the Chairman of Committees	Roderick McKenzie	Liberal	Questioning a ruling by Guinness while the House was in Committee, and persisting despite being warned that Guinness would recall the Speaker. McKenzie refused to express contrition when offered an opportunity to do so by O'Rorke.	
12 October 1900	Maurice O'Rorke at the request of Arthur Guinness, the Chairman of Committees	Frederick Pirani	Independent	Stating that Roderick McKenzie was "repeating a slander circulated by the Premier" (Richard Seddon), and refusing to withdraw his statement.	
7 July 1914	Frederic Lang	John Payne	Labour	Stating on the previous sitting day (3 July) that the Prime Minister (William Massey) "sits there by bribery and corruption," and refusing to withdraw his statement.	
2 November 1914	Frederic Lang	John Payne	Labour	Stating that the Minister of Labour (and Prime Minister), William Massey, was among those responsible for the "murder" of miners killed in an explosion at a mine in Huntly, and refusing to withdraw his statement.	
4 November 1914	Frederic Lang	Paddy Webb	Social Democrat	Stating with regard to the same Huntly explosion that "If justice was done, and some man has to be tried for manslaughter, the Prime Minister is the first man who should be called on to stand his trial," and refusing to withdraw his statement.	
28 September 1915	Frederic Lang	Thomas Wilford	Liberal	Describing the response given to a question he asked of the Minister of Defence, James Allen, as "your dirty answers," and refusing to withdraw his statement without reservation. Wilford withdrew the word "dirty" and replaced it with "typical," but would not obey repeated orders to withdraw completely.	
18 July 1916	Frederic Lang	John Payne	Independent	Stating that if he were the Minister of Finance, Joseph Ward, he "would consider myself the greatest traitor to the British people," and refusing to withdraw his statement, instead adding "I brand him a traitor to the country," and declaring that he would resign rather than withdraw.	
12 December 1921	Frederic Lang	Bill Parry	Labour	Using the word "scabs," and refusing to withdraw it. There was some dispute as to whether Parry had applied the word to MPs specifically, but when he did not return to the chamber to explain himself, the suspension was proceeded with.	
17 March 1932	Charles Statham	Peter Fraser	Labour	Describing the fact that a closure motion accepted by the Chairman of Committees, Sydney George Smith, would end debate on multiple amendments as the most contemptible thing he knew, and refusing to withdraw his statement.	
17 March 1932	Charles Statham	John A. Lee	Labour	Declaring in support of Fraser that the Parliament was a Parliament of curs if it persisted in such a course and failed to pass the amendments in question, and refusing to withdraw his statement.	
24 September 1952	Matthew Oram	Arthur Osborne	Labour	Stating that the Speaker had made no attempt to stop a barrage of interjections by National members upon a Labour speech, and refusing to withdraw his statement.	
15 August 1958	Robert Macfarlane	Tom Shand	National	Stating that the Prime Minister (Walter Nash) "is gagging the House" in response to a ruling by Macfarlane that Nash was speaking in reply on a motion and hence concluding the debate, when National members wished to speak further. Macfarlane considered this a reflection on the chair.	
23 October 1985	Gerry Wall	Merv Wellington	National	Describing Trevor Mallard as a "political lout" and Bill Dillon as a "political lout in garb," and refusing to withdraw his statement.	
5 March 1986	Gerry Wall at the request of John Terris, the Chairman of Committees	John Banks	National	"Repeatedly challenging the authority of the Chair." According to the debate on a Privileges Committee report on the matter, Banks alleged that Terris was in collusion with Fran Wilde, the sponsor of the Homosexual Law Reform Bill.	
16 September 1986	Gerry Wall	Robert Muldoon	National	Refusing to leave the chamber when ordered to do so.	
26 February 1987	Gerry Wall	Winston Peters	National	Refusing to leave the chamber when ordered to do so the previous night. Peters claimed that he had left and then returned, due to general confusion as to which members had been ordered to leave, which Wall did not accept as a mitigating factor.	
26 March 1987	Gerry Wall	John Banks	National	Calling out "It's true, though" as Jim Bolger was withdrawing a statement that Richard Prebble had encouraged immigration overstayers to cast illegal votes for him, repeating the statement when asked to withdraw it, and when ordered to leave the chamber, saying "You don't like it, do you, because your mates were caught cheating" on the way out.	
12 May 1987	Gerry Wall at the request of John Terris, the Chairman of Committees	Merv Wellington	National	Calling out "Rubbish!" while Terris was making a ruling (the details of which are not recorded), refusing to withdraw and apologise, and refusing to leave the chamber when ordered to do so.	
9 July 1987	Gerry Wall	Winston Peters	National	Arguing with the Speaker after raising a point of order as to whether the Committee of the Whole House had reported progress prematurely, continuing to argue on his way out when ordered to leave the chamber, and failing to return to the chamber when ordered to do so until after the motion to suspend him had been moved.	
31 October 1991	Robin Gray	Richard Prebble	Labour	Refusing to leave the chamber when ordered to do so.	
18 August 1992	Jim Gerard (Deputy Speaker)	Michael Laws	National	Describing Mike Moore's claim that Laws would do anything to remain a Member of Parliament as a lie, and refusing to withdraw his statement.	
3 August 1993	Robin Gray	Gail McIntosh	National	Describing Winston Peters' claim that McIntosh "went up to Tauranga and got one vote" as a lie, and refusing to withdraw her statement.	
8 September 1994	Peter Tapsell	Chris Carter	Labour	Calling John Banks a hypocrite over his opposition to abortion, and refusing to withdraw his statement.	
26 August 1999	Doug Kidd	Michael Cullen	Labour	Saying that Max Bradford had lied and was a stooge of the Employers Federation, and refusing to withdraw his statement.	
10 October 2001	Jonathan Hunt	Richard Prebble	ACT	Refusing to leave the chamber when asked, and repeating a statement that he had previously withdrawn, in which he stated that Phil Goff was lying when he said that he did not know that the Chief of Air Staff was opposed to the scrapping of the Royal New Zealand Air Force combat wing.	
5 December 2001	Jonathan Hunt at the request of Geoff Braybrooke, the Chairperson of the Committee of the Whole House	Nick Smith	National	Interjecting "Throw us out! If that's all you give for democracy, you shouldn't be in the Chair!" during a series of points of order over Braybrooke's decision to accept a closure motion, and when asked to withdraw and apologise, instead leaving the chamber while saying "This is not democracy" and refusing to return.	
26 March 2002	Jonathan Hunt at the request of Jill Pettis, the Chairperson of the Committee of the Whole House	Grant Gillon	Alliance	Refusing to withdraw and apologise when ordered to do so by Pettis after Richard Prebble took offence at a statement by Gillon in a point of order.	
1 May 2003	Ann Hartley (Deputy Speaker)	Richard Prebble	ACT	Accusing Hartley of being "silly," "offensive," "not behaving like a Speaker," "trying to play up to [her] government members," and "lying to this House", after Hartley began the process of voting on the third reading of a bill when Prebble believed that he was seeking the call to speak on it. Prebble refused to leave the chamber until some time after the motion to name him had been carried.	
14 May 2003	Jonathan Hunt	Nick Smith	National	Saying "Stop protecting the bloody Prime Minister" on his way out after being told to leave the chamber by Hunt, and then continuing on his way after Hunt ordered him to return to his seat or be named.	
24 June 2003	Jonathan Hunt	Winston Peters	NZ First	Responding "Well, you can run a protection racket if you like, but the reality is that I want some answers in this House and so does everybody else. We have put up with this rubbish for years," when told to leave the chamber by Hunt after an argument between them over Peters' raising of a point of order, and further responding, after being warned by Hunt that he would be named if he did not leave, "I don’t mind if you name me, Mr Speaker. I know what my name is."	
26 June 2003	Jonathan Hunt	Rodney Hide	ACT	Continuing to argue with Hunt after first being told to sit down, and then to leave the chamber, saying "There’s no point in asking questions here," and after being warned that he would named if he said another word, repeating "There is still no point—". As noted by MPs from opposition parties immediately after the naming, this was the second time that Hunt had resorted to the procedure in three days.	
8 September 2004	Jonathan Hunt	Winston Peters	NZ First	Responding "If I hear that threat one more time, it is my intention to leave this House and come back with a motion of no confidence, which I am entitled to put. If any members on this side of the House cannot see the point I am trying to make, then woe be to them," after Hunt had stated "The member is grossly disorderly. If there are any more comments from him today, I will name him," in response to Peters raising points of order accusing Hunt of shielding George Hawkins from questioning.	
17 October 2006	Ann Hartley (Assistant Speaker)	Nick Smith	National	Arguing with Hartley by saying "I simply asked you to explain why" after she told him to leave the chamber, and further arguing with words that are not recorded when she repeated the instruction and added "with no backchat." Hartley had ordered him to leave for interjecting "Can you explain why?" while she was ruling on a point of order he had raised. After an extended series of points of order and procedural arguments among MPs, Michael Cullen brokered a truce whereby Richard Worth successfully sought leave for the naming to be revoked.	
8 May 2019	Trevor Mallard	Nick Smith	National	Arguing with the Speaker; criticised the Speaker after being told to withdraw from the debating chamber.	
29 August 2023	Adrian Rurawhe	Rawiri Waititi	Te Pāti Māori	Grossly disorderly conduct by referring to a matter that the member believed to be under a court ordered suppression order without first giving notice to the Speaker. No ruling was made on whether the matter was in fact subject to a suppression order.	
14 November 2024	Gerry Brownlee	Hana-Rawhiti Maipi-Clarke	Te Pāti Māori	Initiating a haka in protest during voting on the Treaty Principles Bill.	
13 August 2025	Gerry Brownlee	Chlöe Swarbrick	Green	Refusing to withdraw and apologise a comment, then refusing to leave the chamber of the House of Representatives after being told to leave.	

==== Legislative Council ====
Date	Speaker	Member	Party	Reason	Ref
16 October 1901	Henry Miller	Samuel Shrimski	Independent	Saying that George Jones was "one of the worst 'sweaters' in this country," and refusing to withdraw his statement.	

=== Massachusetts General Court ===
==== House of Representatives ====
Date	Speaker	Member	Party	Reason
1929	Leverett Saltonstall	James J. Twohig	Democratic	
August 9, 1939	Christian Herter	Albert E. Morris	Democratic	Refused to be seated while another representative (Albert Bigelow) had the floor.
March 30, 1943	Rudolph King	Jacinto F. Diniz	Democratic	"Vehement personal abuse" on Representative Albert Bigelow, who had proposed an amendment to prevent legislators from receiving a pay raise.

==== Senate ====
Date	President	Member	Party	Reason
October 27, 1981	William M. Bulger	Alan Sisitsky	Democratic	Continuous disruption of Senate proceedings. Was removed by a court officer and suspended until he issued a formal apology to the Senate. He apologized on November 16, 1981, and was reinstated.

== See also ==
- Suspension from the UK parliament
- List of incidents of grave disorder in the British House of Commons
