= Charles-Édouard =

Charles-Édouard is a masculine given name. Notable people with the name include:

- Charles-Édouard Brown-Séquard (1817–1894), Mauritian-born physiologist and neurologist
- Charles-Édouard Campeau (1916–1992), Canadian engineer
- Charles-Édouard Coridon (born 1973), French-Martiniquais football midfielder
- Charles-Édouard D'Astous (born 1998), Canadian Ice Hockey player
- Charles-Édouard Houde (1823–1912), Canadian politician
- Charles-Édouard Lefebvre (1843–1917), French composer
