= Odilon Desmarais =

Canadian politician

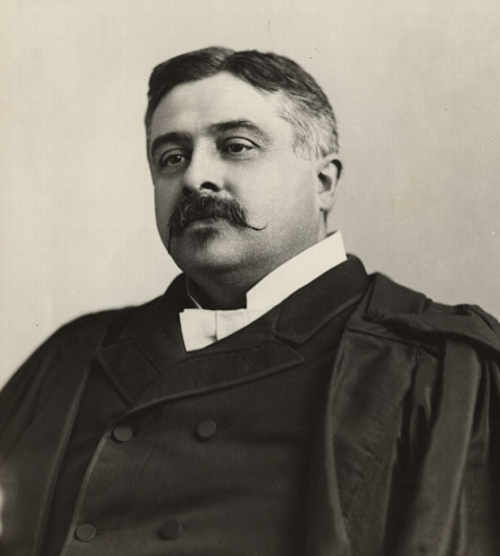

Member of the Canadian Parliament for St. James
- In office 1896–1901
- Preceded by: District was created in 1892
- Succeeded by: Joseph Brunet

Member of the Legislative Assembly of Quebec for Saint-Hyacinthe
- In office 1890–1892
- Preceded by: Honoré Mercier
- Succeeded by: Antoine-Paul Cartier

Personal details
- Born: February 27, 1854 Joliette, Canada East
- Died: May 18, 1904 (aged 50) Trois-Rivières, Quebec, Canada
- Party: Liberal

Odilon Desmarais, KC (February 27, 1854 – May 18, 1904) was a lawyer, judge and political figure in Quebec. He represented Saint-Hyacinthe in the Legislative Assembly of Quebec from 1890 to 1892 and St. James in the House of Commons of Canada from 1896 to 1901 as a Liberal.

He was born in Joliette, Canada East, the son of Jean-Baptiste Desmarais and Émérentienne Beauchamps, and was educated at the Collège de Joliette and McGill University. Desmarais articled in law with Alexandre Lacoste, was called to the Quebec bar in 1876 and practised in Saint-Hyacinthe with Honoré Mercier and in Montreal. Desmarais was also crown prosecutor for Montreal district. In 1877, he married Marie-Louise-Herminie Gélinas.

Desmarais contributed to the newspapers L'Industrie de Trois-Rivières and Le National of Montreal. He was also editor and president of the L'Union printing company.

Desmarais served on the municipal council for Saint-Hyacinthe from 1888 to 1890, when he was elected to the Quebec assembly. He was defeated when he ran for reelection in 1892, losing to Antoine-Paul Cartier. He was elected to the House of Commons in the federal elections held in 1896 and 1900. In 1899, he was named Queen's Counsel. Desmarais resigned his seat in the House of Commons after he was named judge for Trois-Rivières district in 1901.

He died in Trois-Rivières at the age of 50, after suffering a heart attack.
