= Montréal–Saint-Jacques =

Quebec electoral district

Defunct provincial electoral district
- Legislature: National Assembly of Quebec
- District created: 1912
- District abolished: 1965
- First contested: 1912
- Last contested: 1962

Montréal–Saint-Jacques was a former provincial electoral district in the Montreal region of Quebec, Canada that elected members to the Legislative Assembly of Quebec.

It was created for the 1912 election from part of Montréal division no. 2 electoral district. Its final election was in 1962. It disappeared in the 1966 election and its successor electoral district was Saint-Jacques.

== Members of the Legislative Assembly ==
- Clément Robillard, Liberal (1912–1919)
- Irénée Vautrin, Liberal (1919–1923)
- Joseph-Ambroise-Eusebe Beaudoin, Conservative Party (1923–1927)
- Irénée Vautrin, Liberal (1927–1935)
- Henry Lemaître Auger, Conservative Party – Union Nationale (1935–1939)
- Joseph-Romeo Toupin, Liberal (1939–1941)
- Claude Jodoin, Liberal (1942–1944)
- Omer Côté, Union Nationale (1944–1956)
- Paul Dozois, Union Nationale (1956–1966)
