= Joseph Brunet =

Canadian politician and businessman

Member of the Canadian Parliament for St. James
- In office 1902–1904
- Preceded by: Odilon Desmarais
- Succeeded by: Honoré Hippolyte Achille Gervais

Member of the Legislative Assembly of Quebec for Montréal division no. 2
- In office 1890–1892
- Preceded by: District was created in 1890
- Succeeded by: Olivier-Maurice Augé

Personal details
- Born: November 26, 1834 St. Vincent de Paul, Lower Canada
- Died: April 17, 1904 (aged 69) Montreal, Quebec
- Party: Liberal
- Occupation: businessman

Joseph Brunet (November 26, 1834 – April 17, 1904) was a politician and businessman.

Born in St. Vincent de Paul, Lower Canada, Brunet was an alderman for Montreal for two terms between 1872 and 1877 and 1886 to 1902. He was elected to the Legislative Assembly of Quebec as a member of the Quebec Liberal Party to represent Montréal division no. 2 in the 1890 Quebec general election. He was defeated when he ran for re-election in 1892.

He was elected to the House of Commons of Canada as a Member of the Liberal Party in a by-election on January 15, 1902, to represent the riding of St. James. His election was declared void on December 22, 1902.
