= Irénée Vautrin =

Canadian politician

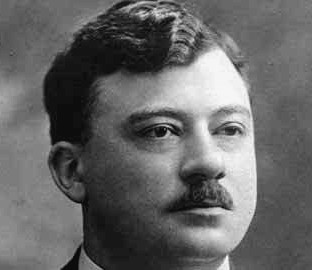
Irénée Vautrin, c. 1935

Irénée Vautrin was a Canadian politician from Quebec.

== Background ==
He was born on December 21, 1888, near Napierville and became an architect.

== Member of Legislative Assembly ==
Vautrin ran as a Liberal candidate for the Legislative Assembly of Quebec in the 1919 election for the district of Montréal–Saint-Jacques and won but was defeated by the Conservative candidate Joseph-Ambroise-Eusèbe Beaudoin in the 1923 election.

He was re-elected in the 1927 and 1931 elections. He served as Deputy Speaker from 1930 to 1934.

== Cabinet Member ==
Vautrin was appointed to the Cabinet and served as Deputy House Speaker from 1930 to 1934, Minister without Portfolio in 1934 and Minister of Colonization from 1934 until his defeat in the 1935 election by the Conservative candidate Henry Lemaître Auger.

Soon after he left office, Vautrin appeared before the Standing Committee on Public Accounts and became one of the favourite targets of Conservative Leader Maurice Duplessis, who exposed the corrupt practices of the Liberal government. The undesired attention earned Vautrin, who had bought pants by the colonization fund for country or forest outings, the unflattering nickname Les culottes à Vautrin. On Bob Calder's advice, Duplessis would make of the culottes a symbol of Liberal decay.

== Death ==
He died on February 2, 1974, in Montreal and was entombed at the Notre Dame des Neiges Cemetery in Montreal.

== Footnotes ==
National Assembly of Quebec
Preceded by Clément Robillard (Conservative)	MLA for Montréal–Saint-Jacques; 1919–1923	Succeeded by Joseph-Ambroise-Eusèbe Beaudoin (Conservative)
Preceded by Joseph-Ambroise-Eusèbe Beaudoin (Conservative)	MLA for Montréal–Saint-Jacques; 1927–1935	Succeeded by Henry Lemaître Auger (Conservative)
