= Roland Beaudry =

Canadian politician (1906–1964)

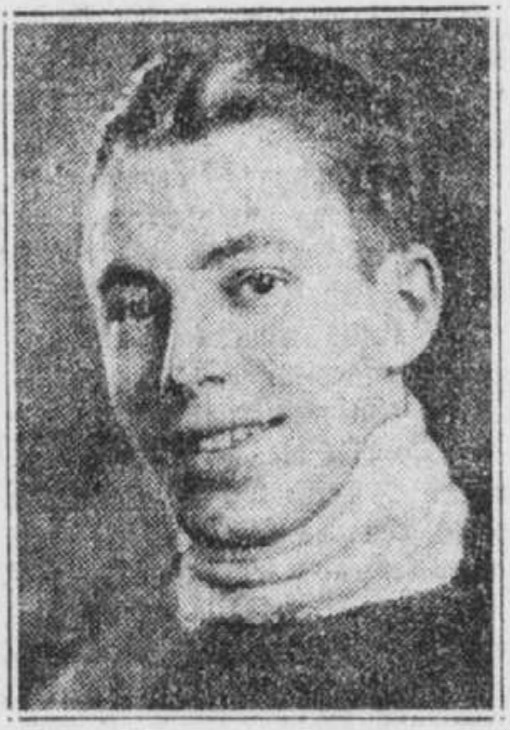

Member of the Canadian Parliament for St. James
- In office 1945–1953
- Preceded by: Eugène Durocher
- Succeeded by: District was abolished in 1952

Member of the Canadian Parliament for Saint-Jacques
- In office 1953–1958
- Preceded by: District was created in 1952
- Succeeded by: Charles-Édouard Campeau

Personal details
- Born: 14 February 1906 Montreal, Quebec, Canada
- Died: 14 December 1964 (aged 58)
- Party: Liberal
- Occupation: Journalist publicist publisher

Joseph Marie Paul Lucien Roland Beaudry (14 February 1906 – 14 December 1964) was a Canadian politician, journalist, publicist and publisher.

== Biography ==
Born in Montreal, Quebec, he was elected to the House of Commons of Canada in the 1945 election as a Member of the Liberal Party to represent the riding of St. James. He was re-elected in 1949 in St. James, and 1953 and 1957 in Saint-Jacques.

=== Involvement in sports ===
Beaudry was also a sports broadcaster and an amateur ice hockey player, a goaltender, and a member of the 1927 Montreal Victorias ice hockey team that toured Europe and played against teams in Sweden (Stockholm), France, Germany, Austria (Vienna), Switzerland (Davos), Italy (Milan) and England. Also a recreational tennis player there was a story retold in the 23 February 1935 issue of the Montreal Gazette where Beaudry during a banquet in Stockholm had agreed to play tennis against one Mr. Gay ("Mr. G") the next morning, but Beaudry slept in the next morning after a late night out, apparently unaware that "Mr. Gay" was in fact the Swedish King Gustaf V.
