= Clément Robillard =

Canadian politician

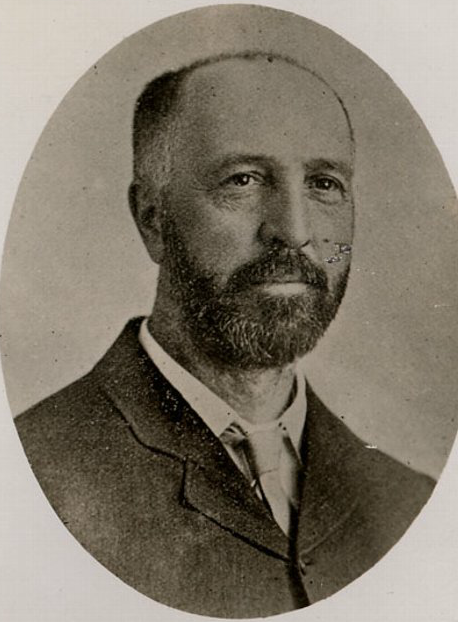

Member of the Legislative Assembly of Quebec for Montréal division no. 2
- In office 1909–1912
- Preceded by: Henri Bourassa
- Succeeded by: District was abolished in 1912

Member of the Legislative Assembly of Quebec for Montréal–Saint-Jacques
- In office 1912–1919
- Preceded by: District was created in 1912
- Succeeded by: Irénée Vautrin

Member of the Legislative Council of Quebec for De Lanaudière
- In office 1919–1926
- Preceded by: Jules Allard
- Succeeded by: Gaspard De Serres

Personal details
- Born: May 31, 1850 Lavaltrie, near L'Assomption, Canada East
- Died: March 20, 1926 (aged 75) Montreal, Quebec
- Party: Liberal

Clément Robillard (May 31, 1850 – March 20, 1926) was a Canadian politician.

Born in Lavaltrie, near L'Assomption, Canada East, Robillard was elected to the Legislative Assembly of Quebec for Montréal division no. 2 in a 1909 by-election. A Liberal, he was re-elected in the riding of Montréal–Saint-Jacques in 1912 and 1916. He did not run in 1919. He was appointed to the Legislative Council of Quebec for de Lanaudière in 1919.

He died in office in Montreal in 1926.
