= Honoré Hippolyte Achille Gervais =

Canadian politician

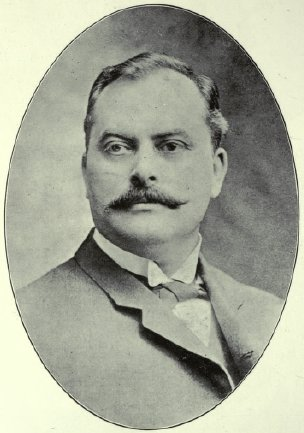

Member of the Canadian Parliament for St. James
- In office 1904–1911
- Preceded by: Joseph Brunet
- Succeeded by: Louis Audet Lapointe

Personal details
- Born: August 13, 1864 Richelieu, Rouville County, Canada East
- Died: August 8, 1915 (aged 50)
- Party: Liberal

Honoré Hippolyte Achille Gervais (August 13, 1864 – August 8, 1915) was a Canadian lawyer, professor, politician.

Born in Richelieu, Rouville County, Canada East, the son of Charles Gervais and Adele Monty, Gervais was educated at the "Petit Seminaire" of Sainte-Marie-de-Monnoir and Université Laval where he received a Master of Laws (LL.M.) in 1887 and a Doctor of Laws (LL.D) in 1889. He was admitted to the Bar of the Province of Quebec on 13 January 1887 and created a Queen's Counsel in 1897.

In 1896, he joined Université Laval as a Professor of International Law and Civil Procedure. He practised law in partnership with Horace Archambault, former President of the Quebec Legislative Council and ex- Attorney-General, Henri-Benjamin Rainville, former Speaker of the Quebec Legislative Assembly, and Paul Rainville in the firm Rainville, Archambault, Gervais & Rainville.

He was first elected to the House of Commons of Canada for the Montreal electoral district of St. James in a 1904 by-election called after the 1902 by-election was declared void. A Liberal, he was re-elected in 1904 and 1908.
