= Olivier-Maurice Augé =

Canadian politician

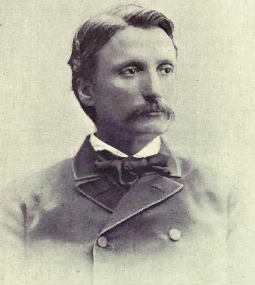

Member of Legislative Assembly of Quebec for Montréal division no. 2
- In office 1892–1897
- Preceded by: Joseph Brunet
- Succeeded by: Lomer Gouin

Personal details
- Born: July 20, 1840 Saint-Ambroise-de-Kildare, near Joliette, Lower Canada
- Died: June 22, 1897 (aged 56) Pointe-aux-Trembles, Quebec
- Party: Conservative

Olivier-Maurice Augé (July 20, 1840 – June 22, 1897) was a Canadian politician.

Born in Saint-Ambroise-de-Kildare, near Joliette, Quebec, Augé was a lawyer before running unsuccessfully as the Conservative candidate in the 1890 Quebec election for the riding of Montréal no. 2. He was elected to the Legislative Assembly of Quebec in 1892 and was defeated in 1897.
