= Saint-Jacques (federal electoral district) =

Former federal electoral district in Quebec, Canada

Quebec electoral district

Defunct federal electoral district
- Legislature: House of Commons
- District created: 1952
- District abolished: 1987
- First contested: 1953
- Last contested: 1984

Saint-Jacques was a federal electoral district in Quebec, Canada, that was represented in the House of Commons of Canada from 1953 to 1988.

There were two separate ridings named "Saint-Jacques". The first was created in 1952 from Cartier and St. James ridings. It was abolished in 1976 when it was redistributed into Laurier and Saint-Henri ridings.

A second "Saint-Jacques" riding was created in 1977 when Saint-Henri was renamed Saint-Jacques. It was abolished in 1987 when it was redistributed into Laurier—Sainte-Marie, Saint-Henri—Westmount and Verdun—Saint-Paul ridings.

== Members of Parliament ==
This riding elected the following members of Parliament:

Parliament	Years	Member	Party
Saint-Jacques; Riding created from Cartier and St. James
22nd	1953–1957	Roland Beaudry	Liberal
23rd	1957–1958	Roland Beaudry	Liberal
24th	1958–1962	Charles-Édouard Campeau	Progressive Conservative
25th	1962–1963	Maurice Rinfret	Liberal
26th	1963–1965	Maurice Rinfret	Liberal
27th	1965–1968	Maurice Rinfret	Liberal
28th	1968–1972	Jacques Guilbault	Liberal
29th	1972–1974	Jacques Guilbault	Liberal
30th	1974–1979	Jacques Guilbault	Liberal
31st	1979–1980	Jacques Guilbault	Liberal
32nd	1980–1984	Jacques Guilbault	Liberal
33rd	1984–1988	Jacques Guilbault	Liberal
Riding dissolved into Laurier—Sainte-Marie, Saint-Henri—Westmount and Verdun—Saint-Paul

== Election results ==
=== Saint-Jacques, 1953–1979 ===
1953 Canadian federal election
Party	Candidate	Votes
Liberal	Roland Beaudry	15,443
Progressive Conservative	Léonard Lauzon	5,274
Independent Liberal	Cléophas Saint-Aubin	1,109
Labor–Progressive	Gui-Louis Caron	1,061
Co-operative Commonwealth	Albert Leduc	545

1957 Canadian federal election
Party	Candidate	Votes
Liberal	Roland Beaudry	7,900
Progressive Conservative	Roland Perron	5,347
Independent Liberal	Jean-Baptiste Crépeau	3,512
Independent Liberal	R. Beaudry	1,789
Co-operative Commonwealth	Gaétan Robert	730

1958 Canadian federal election
Party	Candidate	Votes
Progressive Conservative	Charles-Édouard Campeau	12,798
Liberal	Maurice Rinfret	10,517
Co-operative Commonwealth	Gaétan Robert	670
Independent Liberal	Eugène-J.-E. Fournier	1,825
Socialist	Henri Gagnon	666

1962 Canadian federal election
Party	Candidate	Votes
Liberal	Maurice Rinfret	7,664
Progressive Conservative	Gérard Hébert	7,271
Social Credit	Jean-Paul Poulin	2,023
New Democratic	Willie Fortin	1,925

1963 Canadian federal election
Party	Candidate	Votes
Liberal	Maurice Rinfret	7,841
Progressive Conservative	Gérard Hébert	5,831
Social Credit	Sylvio Mélançon	4,386
New Democratic	Willie Fortin	2,106

1965 Canadian federal election
Party	Candidate	Votes
Liberal	Maurice Rinfret	7,023
Progressive Conservative	Gabriel Grégoire	5,248
Ralliement créditiste	Lucien Mallette	1,576
New Democratic	Willie Fortin	1,406
Independent	Réginald Reggie Chartrand	669

1968 Canadian federal election
Party	Candidate	Votes
Liberal	Jacques Guilbault	9,701
Progressive Conservative	Fernand Alie	4,238
New Democratic	Julien Major	971
Social Credit	Lucien Mallette	705
Independent	Joseph-Louis Abraham	314
Independent	H.-Georges Grenier	311

1972 Canadian federal election
Party	Candidate	Votes
Liberal	Jacques Guilbault	8,682
Progressive Conservative	Armand Lefebvre	3,213
Social Credit	Patricia Métivier	1,696
New Democratic	Pierre Ryan	1,598
Independent	Jean-Baptiste Bulldog Clermont	208
Independent	Claire Demers	151
Independent	André Davignon	97
Independent	G.-Paul Nolet	41

1974 Canadian federal election
Party	Candidate	Votes
Liberal	Jacques Guilbault	7,709
Progressive Conservative	Jean Chevrier	3,518
New Democratic	Jean-Pierre Bourdouxhe	1,313
Social Credit	Roger Pelletier	797
Independent	Jean B. Clermont	154
Communist	Claire Demers	146
Marxist–Leninist	Rhéal Mathieu	127

=== Saint-Jacques, 1979–1988 ===
1979 Canadian federal election
Party	Candidate	Votes
Liberal	Jacques Guilbault	20,520
Progressive Conservative	Jean Chevrier	3,704
New Democratic	David-André Rowley	1,978
Social Credit	J. Alfred Lévesque	1,715
Rhinoceros	Balthazar Michel Deschamps	933
Libertarian	Robert Champlin	295
Communist	Claire Durand	189
Independent	Patricia Métivier	143
Marxist–Leninist	Auguste Arnold	104
Union populaire	Serge Rainville	84

1980 Canadian federal election
Party	Candidate	Votes
Liberal	Jacques Guilbault	17,757
Progressive Conservative	Jean Chevrier	3,038
New Democratic	Roger Monette	2,339
Rhinoceros	Rodrigue Chocolat Tremblay	1,080
Independent	Raymonde Lebreux	224
Libertarian	Marc Krushelnyski	137
Union populaire	Hughette Godard	120
Marxist–Leninist	Arnold August	96
Communist	Daniel Pauquet	88
Independent	Patricia Métivier	55

1984 Canadian federal election
Party	Candidate	Votes
Liberal	Jacques Guilbault	10,875
Progressive Conservative	Lorraine Duguay	10,291
New Democratic	Mike Molter	4,057
Rhinoceros	Pierre dit Lagaffe Corbeil	1,204
Parti nationaliste	Denise Laroche	738
Communist	Marianne Roy	152
Commonwealth of Canada	Robert Langevin	116

== See also ==
- List of Canadian electoral districts
- Historical federal electoral districts of Canada
