= Maurice Rinfret =

Canadian politician

- Official 1966 portrait

Member of Parliament for Saint-Jacques
- In office June 1962 – December 1967
- Preceded by: Charles-Édouard Campeau
- Succeeded by: Jacques Guilbault

Personal details
- Born: 6 March 1915 Montreal, Quebec, Canada
- Died: 26 December 1967 (aged 52)
- Party: Liberal
- Profession: businessman, trader

Maurice Rinfret (6 March 1915 – 26 December 1967) was a Liberal party member of the House of Commons of Canada. He was born in Montreal, Quebec and became a businessman and trader by career.

He was first elected at the Saint-Jacques riding in the 1962 general election after an unsuccessful bid for the seat in 1958. Rinfret was re-elected there in 1963 and 1965, but died in office before completing his term in the 27th Canadian Parliament.

Rinfret was a chief assistant to the government Whip from 1963 to 1967.
