= Eugène Durocher =

Canadian politician

Member of Parliament for St. James
- In office December 1939 – May 1944
- Preceded by: Fernand Rinfret
- Succeeded by: Roland Beaudry

Personal details
- Born: 27 August 1881 Montreal, Quebec
- Died: 10 May 1944 (aged 62) Montreal, Quebec
- Party: Liberal
- Spouse(s): Mercier m. 12 October 1904
- Profession: insurance broker

Eugène Durocher (27 August 1881 – 10 May 1944) was a Canadian politician, serving in municipal and national politics. He was born in Montreal, Quebec and became an insurance broker by career.

From 1938 to 1940, Durocher was a municipal alderman for Montreal City Council, serving on the Montreal Metropolitan Commission in 1939.

He was first elected to the House of Commons of Canada as a Liberal party member at St. James riding in a by-election on 18 December 1939, due to the death of incumbent Fernand Rinfret. He was re-elected there in the 1940 election. Before completing his term in the 19th Canadian Parliament, Durocher died at Hôtel-Dieu hospital in Montreal on 10 May 1944 after poor health for two weeks.
