= Montréal division no. 2 =

Quebec electoral district

Defunct provincial electoral district
- Legislature: National Assembly of Quebec
- District created: 1890
- District abolished: 1912
- First contested: 1890
- Last contested: 1909 (by-election)

Montréal division no. 2 (or Montréal no. 2) was a former provincial electoral district in the Montreal region of Quebec, Canada that elected members to the Legislative Assembly of Quebec.

It was created for the 1890 election from parts of Montréal-Est and Montréal-Centre electoral districts. Its final general election was in 1908 (and there was a by-election in 1909). It disappeared in the 1912 election and its successor electoral district was Montréal–Saint-Jacques.

== Members of the Legislative Assembly ==
- Joseph Brunet, Liberal (1890–1892)
- Olivier-Maurice Augé, Conservative (1892–1897)
- Jean Lomer Gouin, Liberal (1897–1908)
- Henri Bourassa, Ligue nationaliste canadienne (1908–1909)
- Clément Robillard, Liberal (1909–1912)
