= St. James (federal electoral district) =

Former federal electoral district in Quebec, Canada

Quebec electoral district

Defunct federal electoral district
- Legislature: House of Commons
- District created: 1892
- District abolished: 1952
- First contested: 1896
- Last contested: 1949

St. James was a federal electoral district in Quebec, Canada, that was represented in the House of Commons of Canada from 1892 to 1952.

The riding was created in 1892 from parts of Montreal Centre and Montreal East ridings. It consisted initially of St. James's Ward and the East Ward in the city of Montreal. In 1914, it was expanded to include Lafontaine Ward of the city of Montreal. After 1924, it was defined with reference to streets in Montreal.

In 1947, the riding was abolished when it was redistributed into a new St. James riding, and the ridings of Lafontaine, Laurier, Papineau and St. Mary.

The new St. James electoral district was abolished in 1952 when it was redistributed into Laurier and Saint-Jacques ridings.

== Members of Parliament ==
This riding elected the following members of Parliament:

Parliament	Years	Member	Party
St. James; Riding created from Montreal Centre and Montreal East
8th	1896–1900	Odilon Desmarais	Liberal
9th	1900–1901	Odilon Desmarais	Liberal
9th	1902–1902	Joseph Brunet	Liberal
9th	1904–1904	Honoré Hippolyte Achille Gervais	Liberal
10th	1904–1908	Honoré Hippolyte Achille Gervais	Liberal
11th	1908–1911	Honoré Hippolyte Achille Gervais	Liberal
12th	1911–1917	Louis-Audet Lapointe	Liberal
13th	1917–1920	Louis-Audet Lapointe	Opposition (Laurier Liberals)
13th	1920–1921	Fernand Rinfret	Liberal
14th	1921–1925	Fernand Rinfret	Liberal
15th	1925–1926	Fernand Rinfret	Liberal
16th	1926–1926	Fernand Rinfret	Liberal
16th	1926–1930	Fernand Rinfret	Liberal
17th	1930–1935	Fernand Rinfret	Liberal
18th	1935–1939	Fernand Rinfret	Liberal
18th	1939–1940	Eugène Durocher	Liberal
19th	1940–1945	Eugène Durocher	Liberal
20th	1945–1949	Roland Beaudry	Liberal
21st	1949–1953	Roland Beaudry	Liberal
Riding dissolved into Laurier and Saint-Jacques

== Election results ==
1896 Canadian federal election
Party	Candidate	Votes
Liberal	Odilon Desmarais	3,423
Conservative	Louis-Arsène Lavallée	2,054

1900 Canadian federal election
Party	Candidate	Votes
Liberal	Odilon Desmarais	3,256
Conservative	Tancrède Pagnuelo	1,615
Independent	Joseph-Homère Migneron	74

By-election: On Mr. Desmarais being appointed Puisne Judge of the Superior Court of Quebec, 25 June 1901

By-election on 15 January 1902
Party	Candidate	Votes
Liberal	Joseph Brunet	2,899
Conservative	Joseph-Gédéon-Horace Bergeron	2,252

By-election: On election being declared void, 22 December 1902

By-election on 16 February 1904
Party	Candidate	Votes
Liberal	Honoré Hippolyte Achille Gervais	3,269
Conservative	Joseph-Gédéon-Horace Bergeron	2,591

1904 Canadian federal election
Party	Candidate	Votes
Liberal	Honoré Hippolyte Achille Gervais	3,648
Conservative	J. T. Cardinal	2,291

1908 Canadian federal election
Party	Candidate	Votes
Liberal	Honoré Hippolyte Achille Gervais	3,995
Conservative	Napoléon Giroux	2,468

1911 Canadian federal election
Party	Candidate	Votes
Liberal	Louis-Audet Lapointe	4,653
Nationalist Conservative	Olivar Asselin	3,179

1917 Canadian federal election
Party	Candidate	Votes
Opposition (Laurier Liberals)	Louis-Audet Lapointe	acclaimed

By-election: On Mr. Lapointe's death, 7 February 1920

By-election on 7 April 1920
Party	Candidate	Votes
Liberal	Fernand Rinfret	3,413
Labour	Alphetus Mathieu	1,856

1921 Canadian federal election
Party	Candidate	Votes
Liberal	Fernand Rinfret	11,216
Conservative	André Rémi Odilon Léon Gauthier	968
Independent	Ubald Paquin	625

1925 Canadian federal election
Party	Candidate	Votes
Liberal	Fernand Rinfret	12,080
Liberal Protectionist	Ruben Charles Laurier	4,076

1926 Canadian federal election
Party	Candidate	Votes
Liberal	Fernand Rinfret	12,740
Conservative	Georges-Avila Marsan	2,192

By-election: On Mr. Rinfret's acceptance of an office of emolument under the Crown, 5 October 1926

By-election on 2 November 1926
Party	Candidate	Votes
Liberal	Fernand Rinfret	acclaimed

1930 Canadian federal election
Party	Candidate	Votes
Liberal	Fernand Rinfret	13,299
Conservative	Joseph-Paul Lamarche	6,208

1935 Canadian federal election
Party	Candidate	Votes
Liberal	Fernand Rinfret	22,298
Reconstruction	Louis Francœur	10,242
Conservative	Joseph-Paul Lamarche	2,953
Co-operative Commonwealth	Jean-Désiré De Peron	1,147
Independent	Emma Gendron	241

By-election: On Mr. Rinfret's death, 12 July 1939

By-election on 18 December 1939
Party	Candidate	Votes
Liberal	Eugène Durocher	16,986
Unknown	Paul Bouchard	6,368

1940 Canadian federal election
Party	Candidate	Votes
Liberal	Eugène Durocher	27,219
National Government	Joseph-Édouard Jeannotte	5,777
Co-operative Commonwealth	Hector Rochon	1,091
Independent Liberal	Achille Mathieu	864

1945 Canadian federal election
Party	Candidate	Votes
Liberal	Roland Beaudry	23,970
Bloc populaire	Roger Duhamel	12,932
Independent	J.-Édouard Jeannotte	2,040
Co-operative Commonwealth	Hector Rochon	619
Independent Liberal	Émile Mathieu	585
Social Credit	Rosaire Coté	549
Independent Liberal	Georges-Étienne Loiselle	342
Independent	Jean-Hubert Dugas	186

1949 Canadian federal election
Party	Candidate	Votes
Liberal	Roland Beaudry	18,705
Progressive Conservative	Jacques Auger	9,349
Union des électeurs	Jean Grenier	720

== See also ==
- List of Canadian electoral districts
- Historical federal electoral districts of Canada
