= 1986 Scullin by-election =

- 8 February 1986
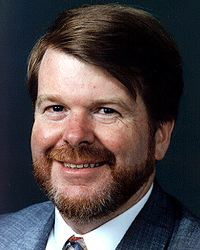

| | First party | Second party |
|---|---|---|
| Candidate | Harry Jenkins | Domenic Cichello |
| Party | Labor | Liberal |
| Popular vote | 34,021 | 11,741 |
| Percentage | 66.3% | 22.9% |
| Swing | ▼5.2pp | ▲4.3pp |
| TPP | 73.2% | 26.8% |
| TPP swing | ▼4.4pp | ▲4.4pp |
MP before election
Harry Jenkins Sr.
Labor
Elected MP
Harry Jenkins
Labor

A by-election was held for the Australian House of Representatives seat of Scullin in Victoria (Australia) on 8 February 1986. This was triggered by the resignation of Labor Party MP and Speaker Harry Jenkins to become Australian Ambassador to Spain.

Scullin had always been a very safe Labor seat, and the election was won easily by Labor candidate Harry Jenkins (the former member's son), despite a swing to the Liberal Party.

== Candidates ==
- Liberal Party of Australia – Domenic Cichello.
- Australian Democrats – Joseph Privitelli.
- Democratic Labor Party – John Mulholland. Mulholland had previously contested three federal elections and one by-election for the DLP.
- Australian Labor Party – Harry Jenkins, a public servant, son of the retiring member Harry Jenkins.
- Socialist Workers Party – Maurice Sibelle.

== Results ==
Scullin by-election, 1986
| Party | Candidate | Votes | % | ±% |
|---|---|---|---|---|
| Labor | Harry Jenkins | 34,021 | 66.3 | −5.2 |
| Liberal | Domenic Cichello | 11,741 | 22.9 | +4.3 |
| Democrats | Joseph Privitelli | 3,727 | 7.3 | +0.6 |
| Socialist Workers | Maurice Sibelle | 930 | 1.8 | +1.8 |
| Democratic Labor | John Mulholland | 924 | 1.8 | −1.4 |
| Total formal votes | | 51,343 | 93.9 | |
| Informal votes | | 3,318 | 6.1 | |
| Turnout | | 54,661 | 87.5 | |
Two-party-preferred result
| Labor | Harry Jenkins | 37,562 | 73.2 | −4.4 |
| Liberal | Dominic Cichello | 13,770 | 26.8 | +4.4 |
| Labor hold | | Swing | −4.4 | |

== See also ==
- List of Australian federal by-elections
