= Henry Lemaître Auger =

Canadian politician (1873–1948)

Henry Lemaître Auger (1873–1948) was a Canadian politician and a two-term Member of the Legislative Assembly of Quebec.

== Early life ==
He was born in West Boylston, Massachusetts on May 2, 1873, to Honoré Lemaître Auger and Marie-Élisabeth Héroux. The family immigrated to Quebec in 1878. He married Marie-Éva Héroux in Trois-Rivières, Mauricie in 1906.

== City Councillor ==
He ran for a seat on the city council of Montreal in 1930 and won against incumbent Damase Généreux. He represented the district of Saint-Jacques. He was re-elected in 1932 and 1934. He resigned in 1936 to enter provincial politics.

== Member of the Legislature ==
Auger ran as a Conservative candidate in the provincial district of Montréal–Saint-Jacques in the 1935 election and won.

He joined Maurice Duplessis's Union Nationale and was re-elected in the 1936 election. He was appointed to the Cabinet and served as Minister of Colonization until he was defeated by the Liberal candidate Joseph-Roméo Toupin in the 1939 election.

== Death ==
He died on June 10, 1948, in Montreal. He was buried in Notre Dame des Neiges Cemetery on June 14.

== Footnotes ==
National Assembly of Quebec
Preceded by Irénée Vautrin (Liberal)	MLA, District of Montréal–Saint-Jacques; 1935-1939	Succeeded by Joseph-Roméo Toupin (Liberal)
