= Fernand Rinfret =

Canadian politician (1883–1939)

The Honourable Fernand Rinfret PC
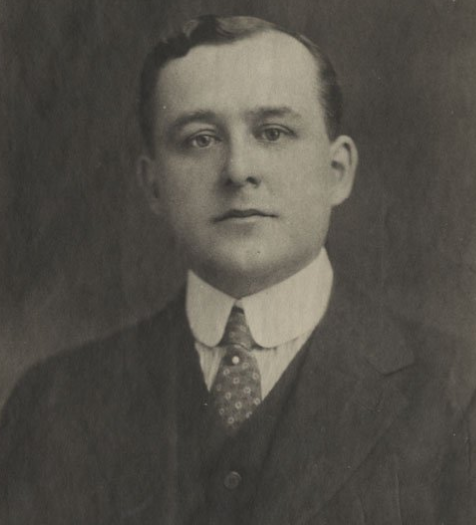
- Fernand Rinfret in ca. 1925

35th Mayor of Montreal
- In office 11 April 1932 – 1934
- Preceded by: Camillien Houde
- Succeeded by: Camillien Houde

Member of the Canadian Parliament for St. James
- In office 1920–1939
- Preceded by: Louis Audet Lapointe
- Succeeded by: Eugène Durocher

26th Secretary of State for Canada
- In office 1926–1930
- Prime Minister: William Lyon Mackenzie King
- Preceded by: George Halsey Perley
- Succeeded by: Charles Cahan
- In office 1935–1939
- Prime Minister: William Lyon Mackenzie King
- Preceded by: Charles Cahan
- Succeeded by: Ernest Lapointe

Personal details
- Born: February 28, 1883 Montreal, Quebec, Canada
- Died: July 12, 1939 (aged 56) Los Angeles, California, United States
- Party: Liberal
- Profession: Journalist

Louis-Édouard-Fernand Rinfret PC (February 28, 1883 – July 12, 1939) was a Canadian politician.

== Biography ==
He was elected to the House of Commons of Canada for the Montreal riding of St. James in a 1920 by-election. A Liberal, he was re-elected in 1921, 1925, 1930, and 1935. From 1926 to 1930 and again from 1935 to 1939, he was the Secretary of State for Canada.

From 1932 to 1934, he was the mayor of Montreal.

He was brother to Thibaudeau Rinfret, the Chief Justice of Canada, and Charles Rinfret, a prominent Montreal businessman.

== Gallery ==
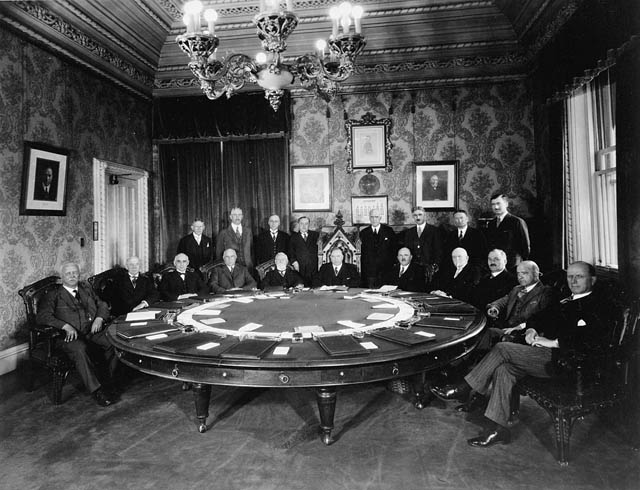
14th Canadian Ministry

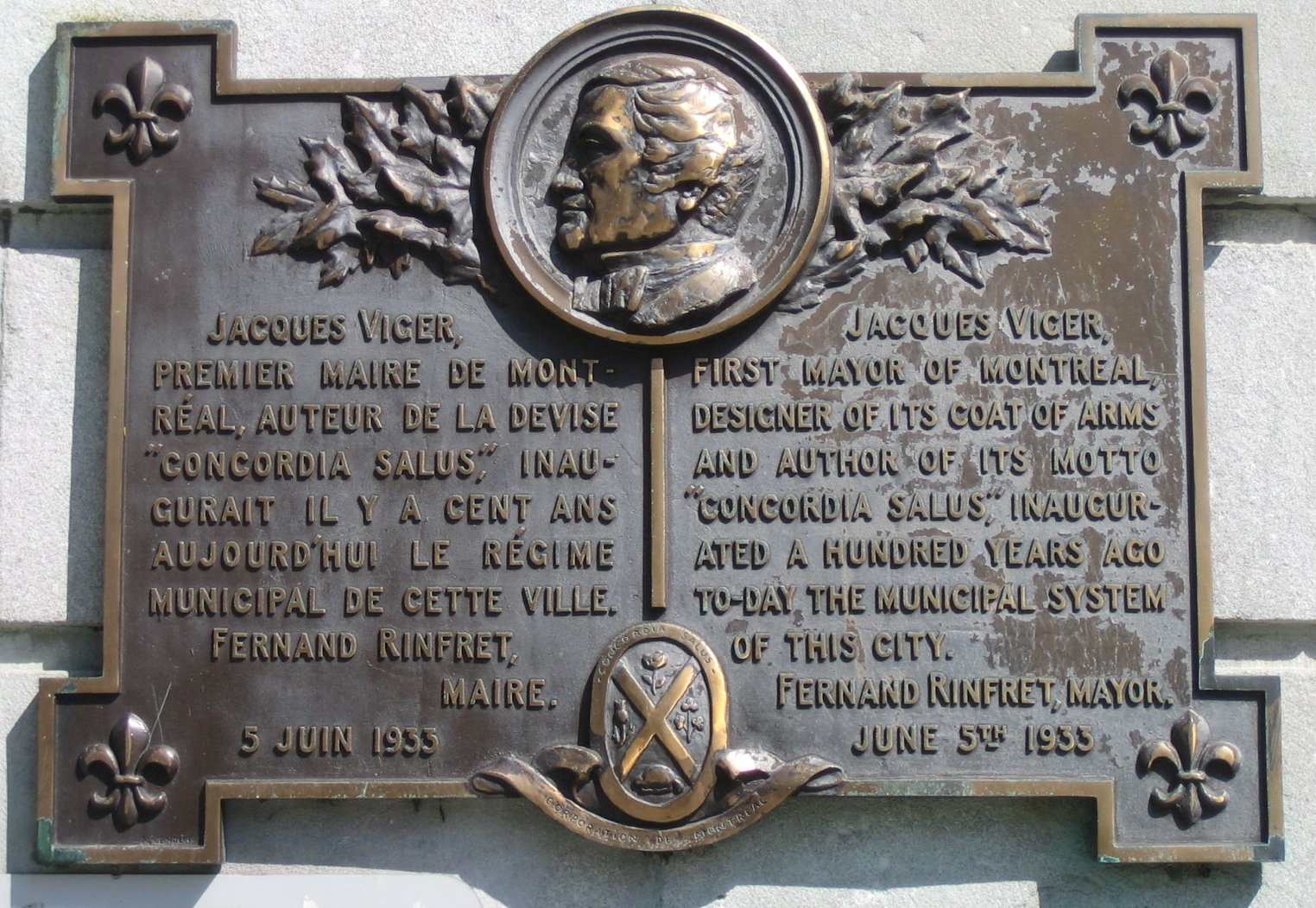
A commemorative plaque, Vauquelin Square

Political offices
Preceded by Sir George Halsey Perley	Secretary of State of Canada; 1926–1930	Succeeded by Charles Hazlitt Cahan
Preceded by Charles Hazlitt Cahan	Secretary of State of Canada; 1935–1939	Succeeded by Ernest Lapointe
