= Louis-Audet Lapointe =

Canadian politician (1860–1920)

Member of the Canadian Parliament for St. James
- In office 1911–1920
- Preceded by: Honoré Hippolyte Achille Gervais
- Succeeded by: Fernand Rinfret

Personal details
- Born: May 16, 1860 Contrecœur, Canada East
- Died: February 7, 1920 (aged 59)
- Party: Liberal

Louis-Audet Lapointe (May 16, 1860 – February 7, 1920) was a liquor merchant, wholesaler and political figure in Quebec. He represented St. James in the House of Commons of Canada from 1911 to 1920 as a Liberal.

He was born in Contrecœur, Canada East, the son of Louis Audet-Lapointe and Marguerite-Adéas Dupré, and was educated in Terrebonne, at the Collège de Varennes and at the Montreal Business College. In 1879, he married Léocadie-Azilda Brunet. He served as a member of the city council for Montreal from 1900 to 1916. He was re-elected in 1917 as a Laurier Liberal. Audet-Lapointe died in office at the age of 59.
