= Antoine-Paul Cartier =

Canadian politician

Antoine-Paul Cartier (June 17, 1849 – July 9, 1934) was a physician and political figure in Quebec. He represented Saint-Hyacinthe in the Legislative Assembly of Quebec from 1892 to 1897 as a Conservative.

He was born in Saint-Antoine-sur-Richelieu, Canada East, the son of Narcisse Cartier and Marguerite Chagnon, and was educated at the Séminaire de Saint-Hyacinthe and the Université Cobourg-Victoria in Montreal. He qualified as a doctor in 1872 and practised in Saint-Antoine-sur-Richelieu, Coaticook and Sainte-Madeleine. In 1872, he married Marie-Louise-Ernestine Lenoblet Duplessis. Cartier was mayor of Sainte-Madeleine from 1903 to 1912 and also served as warden for Saint-Hyacinthe County. He unsuccessfully ran for reelection in 1897 and for a federal seat in 1900 and 1908 as well. Cartier died in Saint-Hyacinthe at the age of 85 and was buried in Sainte-Madeleine.

George-Étienne Cartier was his great-uncle.

A son, Jacques Narcisse Cartier, served as an airman in the first World War.
