= Jacques Guilbault =

Canadian politician

- In office September 1968 – October 1988
- Preceded by: Maurice Rinfret
- Succeeded by: riding dissolved

Personal details
- Born: 29 October 1936 (age 89) Montreal, Quebec
- Party: Liberal
- Profession: engineer

Jacques Guilbault (born 29 October 1936 in Montreal, Quebec) was a Liberal party member of the House of Commons of Canada. He was a professional engineer by career.

== Career ==
He was elected in the 1968 federal election at Saint-Jacques riding and was re-elected in five more general elections. He served six consecutive terms of office from the 28th through the 33rd Canadian Parliaments.

During the 30th Parliament, he was Parliamentary Secretary to the Secretary of State for a year beginning October 1976. This was immediately followed by a year as Secretary to the Minister of National Defence. In his final Parliamentary term from 1984 to 1988, Guilbault was the Liberal deputy House leader during a Progressive Conservative government.

Guilbault was defeated in the 1988 federal election by Benoît Tremblay of the Progressive Conservative party. Guilbault campaigned in the Rosemont electoral district for this election, following the dissolution of his long-time Saint-Jacques riding.

== Electoral record (partial) ==
1988 Canadian federal election: Rosemont
Party	Candidate	Votes	%	±%	Expenditures
Progressive Conservative	Benoît Tremblay	17,127	37.84		$44,311
Liberal	Jacques Guilbault	13,209	29.18	–	$45,624
New Democratic	Giuseppe Sciortino	9,163	20.24		$37,493
Independent	Suzanne Blais-Grenier	2,060	4.55		$8,864
Rhinoceros	Christian Nettoyeur Jolicoeur	1,656	3.66	–	$0
Green	Sylvain Auclair	1,383	3.06		$24
Communist	Gaétan Trudel	151	0.33		$18
Social Credit	Dollard Desjardins	148	0.33		$0
Marxist–Leninist	Arnold August	122	0.27		$130
Independent	Léo Larocque	122	0.27		$5,150
Commonwealth of Canada	Christiane Deland-Gervais	120	0.27		$0
Total valid votes		45,261	100.00		
Total rejected ballots		1,025			
Turnout		46,286	68.31		
Electors on the lists		67,754			
Source: Report of the Chief Electoral Officer, Thirty-fourth General Election, 1988.

1984 Canadian federal election: Saint-Jacques
Party	Candidate	Votes	%
Liberal	Jacques Guilbault	10,875	39.64
Progressive Conservative	Lorraine Duguay	10,291	37.51
New Democratic	Mike Molter	4,057	14.79
Rhinoceros	Pierre dit Lagaffe Corbeil	1,204	4.39
Parti nationaliste	Denise Laroche	738	2.69
Communist	Marianne Roy	152	0.55
Commonwealth of Canada	Robert Langevin	116	0.42
Total valid votes		27,433	100.00
Total rejected ballots		472	
Turnout		27,905	63.21
Electors on the lists		44,147	
