= Charles-Édouard Campeau =

Canadian politician

Member of the Canadian Parliament for Saint-Jacques
- In office March 1958 – June 1962
- Preceded by: Roland Beaudry
- Succeeded by: Maurice Rinfret

Personal details
- Born: 24 April 1916 Montreal, Quebec, Canada
- Died: 20 March 1992 (aged 75) Montreal, Quebec, Canada
- Party: Progressive Conservative
- Spouse(s): Marie Ialenti (m. 7 Sep 1939)
- Children: Pierre and Serge
- Profession: engineer

Charles-Édouard Campeau (24 April 1916 – 20 March 1992) was an engineer and a Progressive Conservative party member of the House of Commons of Canada.

He was first elected at the Saint-Jacques riding in the 1958 general election. After serving his only term, the 24th Canadian Parliament, Campeau left federal politics and did not seek further re-election.
