= Harry Jenkins =

Australian politician (born 1952)

Harry Jenkins AO
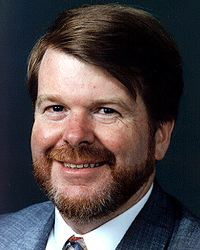

26th Speaker of the Australian House of Representatives
- In office 12 February 2008 – 24 November 2011
- Deputy: Anna Burke; Peter Slipper
- Preceded by: David Hawker
- Succeeded by: Peter Slipper

2nd Second Deputy Speaker of the Australian House of Representatives
- In office 30 April 1996 – 17 October 2007
- Preceded by: Allan Rocher
- Succeeded by: Bruce Scott

24th Deputy Speaker of the Australian House of Representatives
- In office 4 May 1993 – 29 January 1996
- Preceded by: Ron Edwards
- Succeeded by: Garry Nehl

Member of the Australian Parliament for Scullin
- In office 8 February 1986 – 5 August 2013
- Preceded by: Harry Jenkins Sr.
- Succeeded by: Andrew Giles

Personal details
- Born: Henry Alfred Jenkins; 18 August 1952 (age 74) Melbourne, Victoria
- Party: Australian Labor Party
- Relations: Harry Jenkins Sr. (father)
- Education: Australian National University (BSc)
- Occupation: Public servant
- Website: Australian Parliament webpage

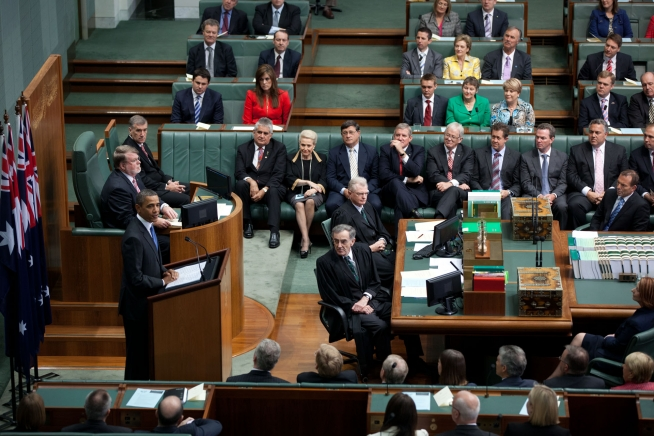
Speaker Harry Jenkins at his post during an address to the Australian Parliament by visiting US President Barack Obama in 2011.

Henry Alfred "Harry" Jenkins, AO (born 18 August 1952) is an Australian former politician who served as the 26th speaker of the Australian House of Representatives from 2008 to 2011. A member of the Australian Labor Party (ALP), he was the member of parliament (MP) for the division of Scullin from 1986 until his resignation in 2013.

== Early life ==
Jenkins was born in Melbourne on 18 August 1952. He was the oldest of four children born to Hazel "Wendy" Winter and Henry Alfred Jenkins. His father, a physician, was elected to the House of Representatives in 1969.

Jenkins attended Ivanhoe Grammar School. He studied medicine at the University of Melbourne for three years, before switching to the Australian National University (ANU) where he completed a Bachelor of Science in 1976 with concentrations in human ecology, biology and biochemistry. After graduating he began working as an estimates officer with the Department of Veterans' Affairs. He was elected to the Whittlesea Shire Council in 1976 and served as shire president from 1984 to 1985.

== Politics ==
Jenkins was president of the ALP's Bundoora branch in the 1980s. In 1985, his father resigned as Speaker to take up as an appointment as ambassador to Spain. Aged 33, Jenkins won ALP preselection for the resulting 1986 Scullin by-election ahead of former Casey MP Peter Steedman and future state government minister Theo Theophanous. He was described by the Canberra Times as "chosen as a compromise candidate by the old and new guards of Victoria's Socialist Left faction".

Jenkins was Deputy Speaker 1993–1996 and Second Deputy Speaker from 1996 to his election as Speaker in 2008. He was the Opposition candidate for Speaker after the 1996, 1998, 2001 and 2004 elections.

=== 42nd Parliament ===
He was elected by Labor caucus on 29 November 2007 to become the Speaker of the House of Representatives in the 42nd Parliament. This was carried by a formal vote on 12 February 2008. He succeeded Liberal incumbent David Hawker. Although Speakers normally carry the courtesy title while in office 'the Honourable', Jenkins said his personal preference was that it not be used.

He is the first speaker whose parent also held the post.

=== 43rd Parliament ===
The Labor Party renominated Jenkins as Speaker in the 43rd Parliament, and he was elected unopposed when the Parliament opened on 28 September 2010.

On 31 May 2011, after a contentious debate on carbon pricing in which Jenkins declared a "general warning" for all members, Liberal MP Bob Baldwin interjected and was named by Jenkins. Baldwin was supported by the Coalition and by independent member Rob Oakeshott and West Australian National member Tony Crook. The resulting vote on suspending Baldwin for 24 hours failed 71–72. Convention would normally have required Jenkins to resign as Speaker, but the House of Representatives immediately thereafter approved a motion of confidence in the Speaker and he remained in the position.

He resigned as the Speaker of the House of Representatives on 24 November 2011, stating, "My desire is to be able to participate in policy and parliamentary debate, and this would be incompatible with continuing in the role of Speaker."

Jenkins retired from politics at the 2013 election.

== See also ==
- Political families of Australia

Parliament of Australia
Preceded by David Hawker	Speaker of the Australian House of Representatives; 2008–2011	Succeeded by Peter Slipper
Preceded by Harry Jenkins Sr.	Member for Scullin; 1986–2013	Succeeded by Andrew Giles
