= Division of Scullin =

Australian federal electoral division

Coordinates: 37.663°S 145.053°E

Scullin Australian House of Representatives Division
- Interactive map of electorate boundaries from the 2025 federal election
- Created: 1968
- MP: Andrew Giles
- Party: Labor
- Namesake: James Scullin
- Electors: 114,965 (2025)
- Area: 174 km^{2} (67.2 sq mi)
- Demographic: Outer metropolitan

The Division of Scullin is an Australian Electoral Division in the state of Victoria. It is located in the outer northern suburbs of Melbourne, including Epping, Lalor, Mill Park, South Morang, Thomastown, Wollert and Bundoora.

== Geography ==
Since 1984, federal electoral division boundaries in Australia have been determined at redistributions by a redistribution committee appointed by the Australian Electoral Commission. Redistributions occur for the boundaries of divisions in a particular state, and they occur every seven years, or sooner if a state's representation entitlement changes or when divisions of a state are malapportioned.

When the division was created in 1968, it largely replaced the abolished Division of Darebin. The new division covered mainly the area of City of Preston (now the northern section of City of Darebin) and a small area of City of Heidelberg (now the western section of City of Banyule). It included the suburbs of Preston, Reservoir, Kingsbury Heidelberg West and Macleod. A redistribution in 1977 massively expanded and shifted the division northwards and westwards into areas previously in the divisions of Diamond Valley and Burke. It expanded up to Craigieburn to the west and Kinglake West to the north, and no longer included Preston, Kingsbury, Heidelberg West and Macleod. The expansion was undone in 1984 and it was shrunk back south towards the metropolitan areas of City of Whittlesea and a small area of City of Broadmeadows (now the southern and northern sections of City of Hume and City of Merri-bek respectively), with the lost areas transferred mainly to the newly-created Division of McEwen. It also lost its remaining areas in the City of Preston to the Division of Batman. In 1988, the division lost the City of Broadmeadows areas (Glenroy, Fawkner etc.) to the divisions of Calwell and Wills, but expanded eastwards up to Diamond Creek.

Between then and 2018, the division continued to cover similar areas, with boundary changes in most redistributions. It also included Hurstbridge between 1989 and 1994. In 2018, the division area was almost shrunk by half and no longer covered any part of Shire of Nillumbik. It only covered the southern and metropolitan portion of the City of Whittlesea, and was centered roughly around Epping. In the 2024 redistribution, it was slightly expanded westwards into City of Hume up to Sydney Road and Hume Freeway and northwards to include all of Wollert, while losing Mernda to the Division of McEwen and a small part of Bundoora to the Division of Jagajaga.

== History ==
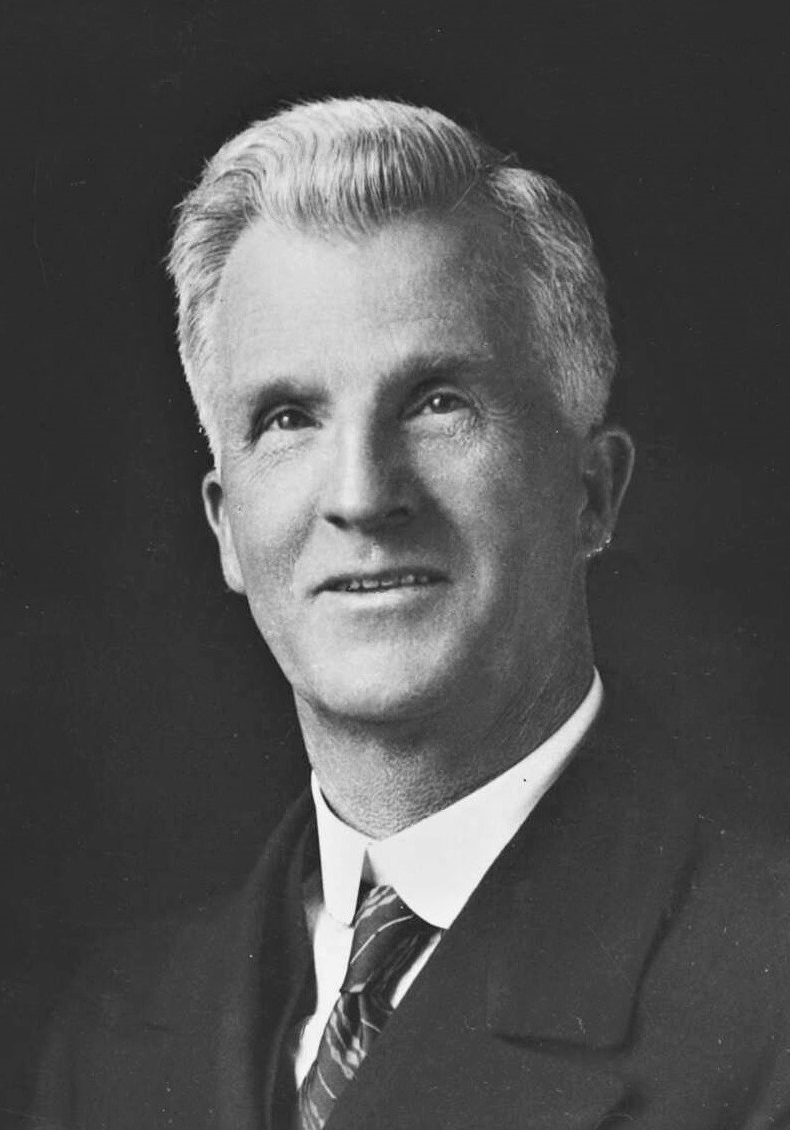
James Scullin, the division's namesake

The Division replaced the abolished Division of Darebin at the redistribution of 21 November 1968. It was named after Rt Hon James Scullin, Prime Minister of Australia from 1929 to 1932. The Division has been a safe seat for the Australian Labor Party since its inception. Labor has never won less than 57 percent of the two-party vote, and has generally garnered enough primary votes to win the seat outright, with the exception of the 1990 and 2022 elections.

From 1969 to 2013, the seat was held by two generations of the Jenkins family. Harry Jenkins Sr. was the Speaker of the Australian House of Representatives from 1983 to 1986. His son, Harry Jr. was Deputy Speaker from 1993–1996, second Deputy Speaker from 1996–2007 and was Speaker from 2007 until 2011.

Harry Jr. retired at the 2013 election, and was succeeded by current member Andrew Giles.

== Members ==
Image	Member	Party	Term	Notes
	Harry Jenkins Sr. (1925–2004)	Labor	25 October 1969 – 20 December 1985	Served as Speaker during the Hawke Government. Resigned to retire from politics
	Harry Jenkins Jr. (1952–)	Labor	8 February 1986 – 5 August 2013	Served as Speaker during the Rudd and Gillard Governments. Retired
	Andrew Giles (1973–)	Labor	7 September 2013 – present	Incumbent. Currently a minister under Albanese

== Election results ==
2025 Australian federal election: Scullin
Party	Candidate	Votes	%	±%
Labor	Andrew Giles	43,348	44.90	−1.31
Liberal	Rohit Taggar	19,807	20.52	−1.25
Greens	Loki Sangarya	9,090	9.42	−1.44
One Nation	Arthur Tsoutsoulis	6,401	6.63	+0.15
Victorian Socialists	Omar Hassan	6,227	6.45	+3.74
Trumpet of Patriots	Adriana Buccianti	5,479	5.68	+5.62
Family First	Cassandra Bell	3,752	3.89	+3.89
People First	Ursula van Bree	2,441	2.53	+2.53
Total formal votes		96,545	92.38	−1.86
Informal votes		7,961	7.62	+1.86
Turnout		104,506	90.93	+5.77
Two-party-preferred result
Labor	Andrew Giles	62,072	64.29	−1.14
Liberal	Rohit Taggar	34,473	35.71	+1.14
Labor hold		Swing	−1.14	
