= Harry Jenkins Sr. =

Australian politician (1925–2004)

The Honourable Harry Jenkins AM
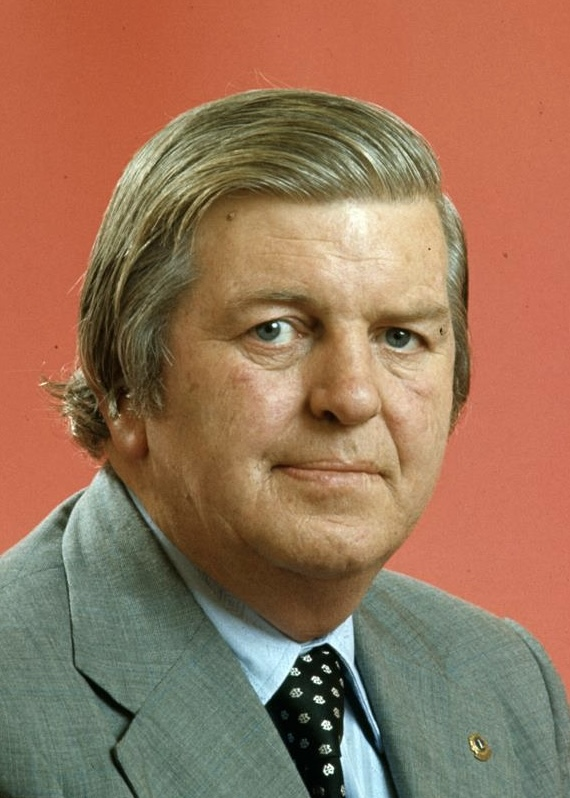
- Jenkins in 1974

18th Speaker of the Australian House of Representatives
- In office 21 April 1983 – 20 December 1985
- Preceded by: Sir Billy Snedden
- Succeeded by: Joan Child

18th Deputy Speaker of the Australian House of Representatives
- In office 19 August 1975 – 11 November 1975
- Speaker: Gordon Scholes
- Preceded by: Joe Berinson
- Succeeded by: Philip Lucock

Member of the Australian Parliament for Scullin
- In office 25 October 1969 – 20 December 1985
- Preceded by: New seat
- Succeeded by: Harry Jenkins

Personal details
- Born: 24 September 1925 Caulfield, Victoria, Australia
- Died: 27 July 2004 (aged 78) Epping, Victoria, Australia
- Party: Labor
- Spouse: Wendy Winter (m. 1951)
- Children: 4, incl. Harry Jenkins
- Education: University of Melbourne, Deakin University
- Occupation: General practitioner

Henry Alfred Jenkins AM (24 September 1925 – 27 July 2004) was an Australian politician and medical doctor. He was a member of the Australian Labor Party (ALP) and served in the House of Representatives from 1969 to 1985, including as Speaker of the House of Representatives from 1983 to 1985. His son Harry Jenkins Jr. also served as Speaker.

== Early life ==
Jenkins was born on 24 September 1925 in Caulfield, Victoria. He was the only surviving child of Eileen Clare (née McCormack) and Henry Alfred Jenkins; his father worked as a storeman and metal polisher.

Jenkins attended state schools before completing his secondary education at Ivanhoe Grammar School. He subsequently studied medicine at the University of Melbourne, graduating Master of Science (MS) in 1948 and Bachelor of Medicine, Bachelor of Surgery (MBBS) in 1952. While studying he worked part-time as a tutor and demonstrator in the university's physiology department, and as a golf caddy. He served his residency at The Alfred Hospital and later worked as a general practitioner at Thornbury and Thomastown.

== Politics ==
At the 1961 Victorian state election, Jenkins was elected as a Labor member of the Victorian Legislative Assembly for the seat of Reservoir, where he served until 1969. In the Victorian Parliament he was Shadow Minister for Health.

Jenkins then moved to the Federal Parliament. He was elected to the House of Representatives for the Division of Scullin at the 1969 election. He served as chairman of committees from August 1975 until the government's dismissal in November 1975, the shortest term on record. After the dismissal of the Whitlam government, Jenkins came under pressure to stand aside from Scullin to allow the President of the ACTU, Bob Hawke, an entry into Parliament at the 1975 election; but he resisted this and Hawke was not to enter politics until 1980. In May 1983, on the election of the Hawke government, Jenkins was elected Speaker of the House, a position he held until his retirement in 1985. He was succeeded as member for Scullin by his son, Harry Jenkins Jr. and Harry Jr. would become Speaker in 2007–11.

== Later life ==
After leaving politics, Jenkins was appointed Australian Ambassador to Spain, a post he held until 1988. In 1991 he was made a Member of the Order of Australia.

== Personal life ==
Jenkins married Hazel "Wendy" Winter in 1951. The couple had a daughter and three sons, with Harry Jr. following his father into federal parliament and also serving as Speaker.

He lived with Kennedy's disease for much of his political career and died on 27 July 2004 in Epping, Victoria, at the age of 78.

== See also ==
- Political families of Australia

Parliament of Australia
Preceded by Sir Billy Snedden	Speaker of the Australian House of Representatives; 1983–1986	Succeeded by Joan Child
New division	Member for Scullin; 1969–1986	Succeeded by Harry Jenkins Jr.
Diplomatic posts
Preceded by D.G. Wilson	Australian Ambassador to Spain; 1986–1988	Succeeded by H.C. Mott
