= Jette (name) =

Jette or Jetté is a French surname and Scandinavian feminine given name. It may refer to:

== As a surname ==
- Alphonse Jetté (1887–1944), Canadian hockey player with the Montreal Canadiens
- Cameron Jette (born 1987), male Canadian cyclo-cross cyclist
- Eric Jette (1897–1963), American metallurgist
- Julius Jetté, Canadian Jesuit missionary priest and ethnographer of the Koyukon (Ten'a) people of interior Alaska
- Louis-Amable Jetté (1836–1920), Canadian lawyer, politician, judge, professor and eighth Lieutenant Governor of Quebec
- Marie-Rosalie Cadron-Jetté or Cadron Jetté (1794–1864), Canadian Catholic nun and founder of the Congregation of the Sisters of Misericorde, declared "Venerable" by Pope Francis in 2013
- Michel Jetté (fl. 1979–present), Canadian/Québécois director, screenwriter, producer and editor

== As a given name ==
- Jette Albinus (born 1966), first woman in the Royal Danish Army to hold the rank of general
- Jette Andersen (runner) (born 1945), a Danish middle-distance runner
- Jette Andersen (born 1959), Danish footballer
- Jette Baagøe (born 1946), director of the Danish Museum of Hunting and Forestry
- Jette Bang (1914–1964), Danish photographer and filmmaker
- Jette F. Christensen (born 1983), Norwegian politician
- Jette Fleschütz (born 2002), a German field hockey forward
- Jette Gottlieb (born 1948), Danish politician
- Jette Hansen (born 1953), Danish footballer
- Jette Hansen (handballer) (born 1987), former female Danish handball player
- Jette Jeppesen (born 1964), Danish athlete
- Jette Müller (born 2003), German diver
- Jette Nevers (born 1943), Danish weaver and textile artist
- Jette Nygaard-Andersen (born 1968), Danish business executive
- Jette Olsen, Danish curler and curling coach
- Jette Philipsen, former women's cricketer for the Denmark national women's cricket team
- Jette Sandahl (born 1949), Danish curator, museum director and business executive
- Jette Sørensen (born 1961), Danish rowing cox
- Jette Thyssen (born 1933), Danish textile artist, painter and lithographer
- Jette Torp (born 1964), Danish singer and entertainer

== See also ==
- Jette, municipality in Belgium
- Jette railway station, a railway station in the municipality of Jette
- Jette, Montana, a census-designated place in Lake County, Montana, United States
- Mount Jetté, a mountain in Alaska and British Columbia, on the Canada–United States border
