= Charles Richard =

Canadian politician (1900–1978)

Member of Parliament for Kamouraska
- In office March 1958 – June 1962
- Preceded by: Benoît Chabot
- Succeeded by: Charles-Eugène Dionne

Personal details
- Born: 10 March 1900 Sainte-Anne-de-la-Pocatière, Quebec
- Died: 31 May 1978 (aged 78) La Pocatière, Quebec
- Party: Progressive Conservative
- Spouse(s): Aurore Blackburn m. 16 September 1928
- Profession: dental surgeon

Charles Richard (10 March 1900 – 31 May 1978) was a Progressive Conservative party member of the House of Commons of Canada. Born in Sainte-Anne-de-la-Pocatière, Quebec, he was a dental surgeon by career.

Richard's first attempt at a House of Commons seat was in the 1935 federal election at Kamouraska, where he was defeated by Joseph Georges Bouchard of the Liberal party.

During World War II Richard was a member of the Royal Canadian Dental Corps. At one time he also served as vice-president of Quebec's provincial dental society (Société dentaire de Québec).

He was first elected at the Kamouraska riding in the 1958 general election. He served only one federal term, the 24th Canadian Parliament, before being defeated in the 1962 election by Charles-Eugène Dionne of the Social Credit party.
