= Antifa =

Antifa or antifa is an abbreviation for anti-fascism (against fascism), and may be used to refer to:

== Organizations ==
- Rosa Antifa, a group in Vienna, Austria, active since 1995
- Rose City Antifa, an American anti-fascist group based in Portland, Oregon, active since 2007

== Political or social movements ==
- Antifa (Germany), a far-left political movement in Germany
- Antifa (Israel), a movement of left-wing and far-left Israeli activist groups
- Antifa (United States), a movement of anti-fascist activists in the U.S.
- Antifa (Poland)

== Other uses ==
- Antifa: The Anti-Fascist Handbook, a 2017 book by historian Mark Bray

== See also ==
- Anti-fascism, including the history of opposition to fascism before and during WWII
- Post–World War II anti-fascism, including antifa groups
- Antifaschistische Aktion ('Anti-Fascist Action'), a pre-WWII anti-fascist group with ties to the Communist Party of Germany
- Anti-Fascist Action (AFA), a British group active 1985–2001
- Antifascistisk Aktion, a Swedish group active since 1993
- Groupe antifasciste Lyon et environs, a French group active since 2013 in and around the city of Lyon, still active despite being officially banned in 2023
- Montréal Antifasciste ('Montreal Anti-Fascist'), a Canadian group active in Quebec since 2017
