= List of members of the Canadian House of Commons with military service (D) =

Name	Elected party	Constituency	Elected date	Military service
John Waterhouse Daniel	Conservative	City of St. John	February 16, 1904	United States Army (1865-1871)
Barnett Jerome Danson	Liberal	York North	June 25, 1968	Canadian Army (1939-1945)
Vincent Martin Dantzer	Progressive Conservative	Okanagan North	February 18, 1980	Royal Canadian Air Force (1942-1946)
Donald Watson Davis	Conservative	Alberta	February 22, 1887	United States Army
John "Jack" Davis	Liberal	Coast—Capilano	June 18, 1962	Royal Canadian Air Force
Grant Deachman	Liberal	Vancouver Quadra	April 8, 1963	Canadian Army
Walter Deakon	Liberal	High Park	June 25, 1968	Royal Canadian Air Force (1943-1945)
Azellus Denis	Liberal	St. Denis	October 14, 1935	Canadian Army
Louis Deniset	Liberal	St. Boniface	June 10, 1957	Canadian Army (1954-1957)
Frederick Charles Denison	Conservative	West Toronto	February 22, 1887	Militia (1884-1885)
Louis Léon Lesieur Desaulniers	Conservative	Saint Maurice	September 20, 1867	Militia
Louis-Georges Desjardins	Conservative	Montmorency	July 25, 1890	Militia (1884-1898)
Édouard Desrosiers	Progressive Conservative	Hochelaga—Maisonneuve	September 4, 1984	Canadian Army (1952-1954)
Alexis Dessaint	Liberal	Kamouraska	February 22, 1887	Militia (1883-1890)
Bernard Devlin	Liberal	Montreal Centre	January 12, 1875	Militia (1866-)
Edgar Dewdney	Conservative	Yale	October 12, 1872	Militia
John Horace Dickey	Liberal	Halifax	July 14, 1947	Canadian Army (1946-1947)
John Diefenbaker	Conservative	Lake Centre	March 26, 1940	Canadian Army (1916-1917)
Walter Gilbert Dinsdale	Progressive Conservative	Brandon	June 25, 1951	Royal Canadian Air Force (1941-1945)
Joseph-Alfred Dion	Independent Liberal	Lake St. John—Roberval	June 11, 1945	Canadian Army (1917-1919)
Charles Joseph Doherty	Conservative	St. Anne	October 26, 1908	Militia (1885)
James Domville	Conservative	King's	October 12, 1872	Militia
Samuel James Donaldson	Conservative	Prince Albert	February 1, 1915	Canadian Army (1915-1917)
Frédéric Dorion	Independent	Charlevoix—Saguenay	November 30, 1942	Royal Air Force
Tommy Douglas	Co-operative Commonwealth Federation	Weyburn	October 14, 1935	Canadian Army (1940-)
Robert Doull	Liberal-Conservative	Pictou	October 12, 1872	Militia
George Alexander Drew	Progressive Conservative	Carleton	December 20, 1948	Canadian Army
Robert Earle Drope	Progressive Conservative	Northumberland	June 11, 1945	Canadian Army
Claude Drouin	Liberal	Beauce	June 2, 1997	Canadian Forces Air Command
Charles "Bud" Drury	Liberal	Saint-Antoine—Westmount	June 18, 1962	Canadian Army (1933-1970), Royal Canadian Air Force (1935-1936)
Joseph Dubuc	Conservative	Provencher	September 17, 1878	Militia (1871-1874)
Henri Jules Juchereau Duchesnay	Nationalist Conservative	Dorchester	February 22, 1887	Militia (1880-1887)
Louis Duclos	Liberal	Montmorency	July 8, 1974	Canadian Army
Joseph Duguay	Conservative	Yamaska	October 12, 1872	Militia (1858-1882)
Armand Dumas	Liberal	Villeneuve	June 27, 1949	Canadian Army (1940-1944)
Joseph Dumont	Liberal	Kamouraska	September 17, 1878	Papal Army (1869-)
Christopher Dunkin	Conservative	Brome	September 20, 1867	Militia
Maurice Dupras	Liberal	Labelle	November 16, 1970	Royal Canadian Air Force (1942-1945)
