= List of lieutenant governors of Quebec =

The following is a list of the lieutenant governors of Quebec. Though the present day office of the lieutenant governor in Quebec came into being only upon the province's entry into Canadian Confederation in 1867, the post is a continuation from the first governorship of New France in 1627, through the governor generalcy of New France, and the governorship of the Province of Quebec. From 1786 to 1841, the Governors General of The Canadas simultaneously acted as the direct governor of Lower Canada, only occasionally appointing a lieutenant to act in their stead.

== Lieutenant governors of the Province of Quebec, 1760–1791 ==
#	Name	Lieutenant Governor from	Lieutenant Governor until
Lieutenant governors under George III (1760–1791):
1.	Guy Carleton (lieutenant governor to James Murray)	1766	1768
2.	Hector Theophilus de Cramahé (acting lieutenant governor to Guy Carleton)	1771	1782
3.	Henry Hamilton (lieutenant governor to Frederick Haldimand)	1782	1785
4.	Henry Hope (lieutenant governor to the Lord Dorchester)	1785	1788
5.	Sir Alured Clarke (lieutenant governor to the Lord Dorchester)	1790	→

== Lieutenant governors of Lower Canada, 1791–1841 ==
#	Name	Lieutenant Governor from	Lieutenant Governor until
Lieutenant governors under George III (1791–1820):
5.	cont...	←	1795
6.	Robert Milnes (lieutenant governor to Robert Prescott)	1797	1808
	Thomas Dunn (administrator to Sir James Henry Craig)	1805	1811
7.	Francis Nathaniel Burton (lieutenant governor to George Ramsay, 9th Earl of Dalhousie)	1808	1832

== Lieutenant governors of Quebec, 1867–present ==
#	Name	Lieutenant Governor from	Lieutenant Governor until	Time in office
Lieutenant governors under Victoria (1867–1901):
8.	Sir Narcisse-Fortunat Belleau	1 July 1867	11 February 1873	5 years, 225 days
9.	René-Édouard Caron	11 February 1873	13 December 1876	3 years, 304 days
10.	Luc Letellier de St-Just	15 December 1876	26 July 1879	2 years, 223 days
11.	Théodore Robitaille	26 July 1879	4 October 1884	5 years, 70 days
12.	Louis-Rodrigue Masson	4 October 1884	4 October 1887	3 years, 0 days
13.	Auguste-Réal Angers	4 October 1887	5 December 1892	5 years, 62 days
14.	Sir Joseph-Adolphe Chapleau	5 December 1892	20 January 1898	5 years, 46 days
15.	Sir Louis-Amable Jetté	20 January 1898	→	
Lieutenant governors under Edward VII (1901–1910):
15.	cont...	←	15 September 1908	10 years, 239 days
16.	Sir Charles Alphonse Pantaléon Pelletier	15 September 1908	→	
Lieutenant governors under George V (1910–1936):
16.	cont...	←	29 April 1911	2 years, 226 days
Admin.	Sir Louis-Amable Jetté	29 April 1911	5 May 1911	6 days
17.	Sir François Langelier	5 May 1911	8 February 1915	3 years, 279 days
18.	Sir Pierre-Évariste Leblanc	8 February 1915	18 October 1918	3 years, 252 days
Admin.	Jean-Baptiste-Gustave Lamothe	18 October 1918	21 October 1918	3 days
19.	Sir Charles Fitzpatrick	21 October 1918	31 October 1923	5 years, 10 days
20.	Louis-Philippe Brodeur	31 October 1923	1 January 1924	62 days
Admin.	Eugène Lafontaine	1 January 1924	8 January 1924	7 days
21.	Narcisse Pérodeau	8 January 1924	10 January 1929	5 years, 2 days
22.	Sir Jean Lomer Gouin	10 January 1929	28 March 1929	67 days
Admin.	Eugène Lafontaine (2nd time)	28 March 1929	2 April 1929	5 days
23.	Henry George Carroll	2 April 1929	29 April 1934	5 years, 27 days
24.	Esioff-Léon Patenaude	29 April 1934	→	
Lieutenant governors under Edward VIII (1936):
24.	cont...	←	→	
Lieutenant governors under George VI (1936–1952):
24.	cont...	←	30 December 1939	5 years, 245 days
25.	Sir Eugène Fiset	30 December 1939	3 October 1950	10 years, 277 days
26.	Gaspard Fauteux	3 October 1950	→	
Lieutenant governors under Elizabeth II (1952–2022):
26.	cont...	←	14 February 1958	7 years, 134 days
27.	Onésime Gagnon	14 February 1958	30 September 1961	3 years, 228 days
Admin.	Lucien Tremblay	30 September 1961	12 October 1961	12 days
28.	Paul Comtois	12 October 1961	21 February 1966	4 years, 132 days
Admin.	Lucien Tremblay (2nd time)	21 February 1966	22 February 1966	1 day
29.	Hugues Lapointe	22 February 1966	27 April 1978	12 years, 64 days
30.	Jean-Pierre Côté	27 April 1978	28 March 1984	5 years, 336 days
31.	Gilles Lamontagne	28 March 1984	9 August 1990	6 years, 134 days
32.	Martial Asselin	9 August 1990	8 August 1996	5 years, 365 days
33.	Jean-Louis Roux	8 August 1996	30 January 1997	175 days
34. (Note: Colour denotes living former lieutenant governors)	Lise Thibault	30 January 1997	7 June 2007	10 years, 128 days
35.	Pierre Duchesne	7 June 2007	24 September 2015	8 years, 109 days
36.	J. Michel Doyon	24 September 2015	→	
Lieutenant governors under Charles III (2022–present):
36.	cont...	←	25 January 2024	8 years, 123 days
37.	Manon Jeannotte	25 January 2024	Present	2 years, 89 days (as of April 24, 2026)

== See also ==
- Office-holders of Canada
- Canadian incumbents by year
