= Charles Bruno Blondeau =

Canadian politician (1835–1888)

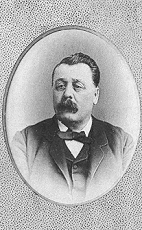

Member of the Canadian Parliament for Karmouraska
- In office 1882–1887
- Preceded by: Joseph Dumont
- Succeeded by: Alexis Dessaint

Personal details
- Born: March 22, 1835 St. Pascal de Kamouraska, Lower Canada
- Died: July 4, 1888 (aged 53) Saint-Pascal, Quebec
- Party: Conservative Party
- Occupation: contractor

Charles Bruno Blondeau (March 22, 1835 – July 4, 1888) was a Canadian politician and contractor. He was elected to the House of Commons of Canada as a Member of the Conservative Party to represent the riding of Kamouraska in the 1882 election. He was defeated in the 1887 election.

The son of Antoine Blondeau and Angèle Lebel, he was educated in St. Pascal and at Sainte-Anne-de-la-Pocatière. In 1860, he married Adelaide Patry.
