= Charles-François Roy =

Canadian politician

Member of the Canadian Parliament for Kamouraska
- In office 1877–1878
- Preceded by: Charles Alphonse Pantaléon Pelletier
- Succeeded by: Joseph Dumont

Member of the Legislative Assembly of Quebec for Kamouraska
- In office 1869–1877
- Succeeded by: Joseph Dumont

Personal details
- Born: September 14, 1835 Sainte-Anne-de-la-Pocatière, Lower Canada
- Died: April 13, 1882 (aged 46) Sainte-Anne-de-la-Pocatière, Quebec
- Party: Conservative

Charles-François Roy (September 14, 1835 – April 13, 1882) was a civil engineer, land surveyor and political figure in Quebec. He represented Kamouraska in the Legislative Assembly of Quebec from 1869 to 1877 and Kamouraska in the House of Commons of Canada from 1877 to 1878 as a Conservative member.

He was born in Sainte-Anne-de-la-Pocatière, Quebec, the son of François Roy and Angèle Sasseville, and was educated at the college there. In 1860, he married Charlotte Sasseville. He served as colonization agent for the Gaspé district from 1862 to 1868. Roy resigned his seat in the provincial assembly in 1877 to run for a seat in the House of Commons after Charles Alphonse Pantaléon Pelletier was named to the Senate. He was defeated by Joseph Dumont when he ran for reelection in 1878. Roy died at Sainte-Anne-de-la-Pocatière at the age of 47.
