= Charles-Antoine-Ernest Gagnon =

Canadian politician

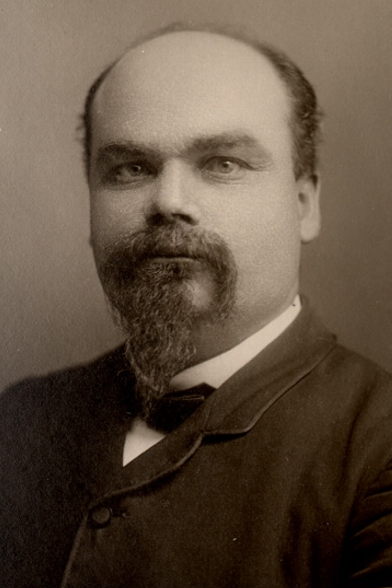

Member of the Legislative Assembly of Québec for Kamouraska
- In office 1878–1890
- Preceded by: Joseph Dumont
- Succeeded by: Charles-Alfred Desjardins

Personal details
- Born: December 4, 1846 Rivière-Ouelle, Canada East
- Died: June 11, 1901 (aged 54) Québec, Québec
- Party: Liberal

Charles-Antoine-Ernest Gagnon (December 4, 1846 – June 11, 1901) was a notary and political figure in Québec. He represented Kamouraska in the Legislative Assembly of Québec from 1878 to 1890 as a Liberal.

He was born in Rivière-Ouelle, Québec, Canada East. He was the son of Antoine Gagnon and Julie-Adèle Pelletier, who was the sister of Charles-Alphonse-Pantaléon Pelletier. He was educated at the Collège de Sainte-Anne-de-la-Pocatière and was licensed as a notary in 1869, setting up practice at Rivière-Ouelle and later in Québec. Gagnon also served as secretary-treasurer for the municipality and for the school board of Rivière-Ouelle. Gagnon married Marie-Malvina Gagnon in 1870. He helped found the Québec newspaper L'Électeur in 1880. His election in 1881 was overturned in 1883 but he won the subsequent by-election. He served in the cabinet of prime minister Honoré Mercier as provincial secretary and registrar from 1887 to 1890. Gagnon was sheriff for Québec district from 1890 to 1901. He was president of the Québec Board of Notaries from 1885 to 1890. Gagnon died in Québec at the age of 54 and was buried in Rivière-Ouelle.
