= Antifascistisk Aktion =

Swedish anti-fascist movement

The Antifascistisk aktion (AFA) is a far-left, extra-parliamentary, anti-fascist movement in Sweden, whose stated goal is to "smash fascism in all its forms". The purpose of the organization is to exchange information and to coordinate activities between local groups.

The groups' activities have included handing out flyers, organizing demonstrations, direct action, and property destruction. The group has no central authority, using a flat organization structure consisting of many independent groupings, without a board or leader. AFA works with other anti-racist groups all over Europe. The groups' origins are in the heterogeneous anti-fascist groups of the late 1930s and early 1940s, mostly made up of social democrats, communists, and progressive Christians. Their ideology is libertarian socialism.

== History ==
1932 "Come to us" poster of the German Antifaschistische Aktion

The name Antifaschistische Aktion (Anti-Fascist Action) was used from the early 1930s in Germany. The name was subsequently used by anti-fascist groups in several other countries.

Antifascistisk aktion (AFA) was founded in Sweden in 1993. AFA is a part of the "autonomous" (autonoma in Swedish, from autonomist Marxism) subculture, which revolves around many forms of leftist activism like antifascism, environmentalism and animal rights activism. This subculture includes people of many different ideologies, but the ideologies of the movement is always some form of radical leftism. In stark contrast to the American Antifa, the Swedish AFA is not open to more moderate forms of leftism, and on one occasion members of a left-wing party were spat upon by them.

== Approach ==
Their Activity Guide advocates direct action against neo-Nazis. AFA members have admitted to arson by timed firebombs, and have pleaded guilty to burning the Tråvad spinnery in 2005. In January 2006, Swedish AFA members attacked the Norrköping immigration office and threatened officials. In June 2006, AFA members broke windows of an estate of the Christian Democrats in Kalmar. In October 2006, AFA members threatened to block a municipal council meeting in Gothenburg, because the Sweden Democrats had been elected to the council.

In July 2007, AFA members threatened and attacked an immigration judge in Gothenburg. The judge's front door was hit with an axe, and the house was vandalized with red spraypaint. Personal information about the judge and other judges was posted on the Internet. On 7 March 2008, Säpo, the Swedish security police agency, reported that AFA or people using its symbols constantly threaten municipal and provincial elected council members. In August 2008, AFA members spread announcements in Uppsala with the name and image of an opponent, encouraging people to attack him. For this, AFA promised to pay 500 Swedish kronor and a free "knogjärn" (knuckle duster). In February 2009, AFA members attacked the National Democrats politician Vávra Suk.

== Criticism ==
An editorial in the tabloid newspaper Expressen argued that the anti-fascist label was misleading because the organization's methods such as stealing the subscriber list of the National Democrats newspaper and threatening the subscribers are counterproductive and similar to methods used by fascists.

== See also ==
- Anti-Fascist Action
- Anti-Fascist Action (disambiguation)
- Post-World War II anti-fascism
- Unite Against Fascism
