= Joseph Georges Bouchard =

Canadian politician

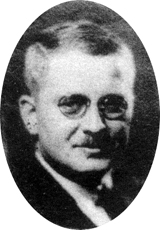

Member of the Canadian Parliament for Kamouraska
- In office 1922–1940
- Preceded by: Charles Adolphe Stein
- Succeeded by: Louis Philippe Lizotte

Personal details
- Born: April 23, 1888 Saint-Philippe-de-Néri, Quebec, Canada
- Died: August 4, 1956 (aged 68)
- Party: Liberal
- Occupation: agrologist teacher

Joseph Georges Bouchard (born April 23, 1888 in Saint-Philippe-de-Néri, Quebec, Canada-died August 4, 1956) was a Canadian politician, agrologist and teacher. He was acclaimed to the House of Commons of Canada in 1922 as a Member of the Liberal Party to represent the riding of Kamouraska. He was elected in the elections of 1925, 1926, 1930 and 1935. During his time in office, he also authored numerous books.

== Archives ==
There are Joseph Georges Bouchard fonds at the Société Historique de la Côte-du-Sud (fonds F002) and Library and Archives Canada (fonds

R13132).
