= Eugène Marquis =

Canadian politician

Member of Parliament for Kamouraska
- In office June 1945 – August 1949

Personal details
- Born: 11 September 1901 Saint-Alexandre-de-Kamouraska, Quebec
- Died: 15 November 1994 (aged 93)
- Party: Liberal
- Spouse(s): Veronique Chabot m. 14 January 1931
- Profession: crown attorney, lawyer, judge

Eugène Marquis (11 September 1901 – 15 November 1994) was a Liberal party member of the House of Commons of Canada. He was born in Saint-Alexandre-de-Kamouraska, Quebec and became a crown attorney, judge and lawyer by career.

Marquis was educated at Sainte-Anne-de-Beaupré, Sainte-Anne-de-la-Pocatière and at the Quebec Seminary. From February 1931 to July 1936, he was Crown Attorney for the District of Quebec, and served in that capacity again from November 1939 to September 1944.

He was first elected to Parliament at the Kamouraska riding in the 1945 general election then re-elected in 1949. On 24 August 1949, he resigned from the House of Commons and accepted an appointment as a judge of the Superior Court of Quebec.
