= La Nation =

La Nation (The Nation) was a weekly review covering Canadian (Québécois) politics and literature. It was directed by Paul Bouchard and ran from 1936 to 1939. It had a right wing sovereigntist, Quebec nationalist stance, and took for its motto "Pour un État libre français en Amérique" (For a Free French State in America).

La Nation's writers consisted of students who rejected the clerico-nationalism of the Catholic priest and nationalist Lionel Groulx. The weekly aimed to be both secular and critical of the British. Its supporters formed the Republican Fasces, a small, fascist group which was similarly directed by Bouchard.

In 1962, supporters of Quebec independence reclaimed the heritage of La Nation and founded La Libre Nation, whose motto was "Pour un Québec libre et français" (For a Free and French Quebec).

== See also ==
- Quebec nationalism
- Paul Bouchard
