= Henry George Carroll =

Canadian politician

The Honourable Henry George Carroll KC
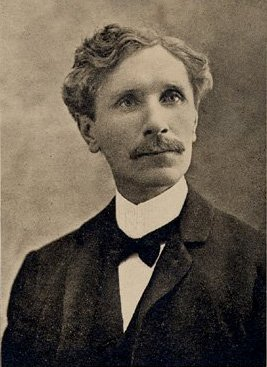

16th Lieutenant Governor of Quebec
- In office April 2, 1929 – April 29, 1934
- Monarch: George V
- Governors General: The Earl of Willingdon; The Earl of Bessborough
- Premier: Louis-Alexandre Taschereau
- Preceded by: Lomer Gouin
- Succeeded by: Esioff-Léon Patenaude

Member of the Canadian Parliament for Kamouraska
- In office March 5, 1891 – November 3, 1904
- Preceded by: Alexis Dessaint
- Succeeded by: Ernest Lapointe

Personal details
- Born: January 31, 1865 Kamouraska, Canada East
- Died: August 20, 1939 (aged 74) Quebec City, Quebec
- Party: Liberal
- Occupation: Lawyer
- Cabinet: Solicitor General of Canada (1902-1904)

Henry George Carroll, KC (January 31, 1865 – August 20, 1939) was a Canadian politician, jurist and the 16th lieutenant governor of Quebec from 1929 to 1934. He was the last anglophone to serve in that position to the present day.

Born in Kamouraska, Canada East to Michael Burke Carroll of Ireland and Marguerite Campbell of Scotland, Carroll studied law at Laval University, was called to the Quebec Bar in 1889, and was created a Queen's Counsel in 1899.

A Liberal, he was first elected to the House of Commons of Canada in 1891 representing Kamouraska and was re-elected in 1896 and 1900. He was appointed Solicitor General of Canada in 1902 and served until 1904 at a time when the position was not a cabinet office but was part of the ministry under the Minister of Justice. He left politics to become a judge in the Quebec Superior Court in 1904 and was appointed to the Court of King's Bench in 1908. In 1912 he served as chairman of Quebec's Royal Commission examining the alcohol trade, and subsequently served as vice-president province's Quebec Liquor Commission (Commission des liqueurs du Québec) from 1921 to 1929, when he was appointed lieutenant governor of Quebec following the sudden death of Gouin.

Carroll died in Quebec and was buried in his home town of Kamouraska in 1939. His wife was Boulanger Malvine-Amazelie.
