= Kamouraska (provincial electoral district) =

Coordinates: 47.53°N 69.83°W

Quebec electoral district

Defunct provincial electoral district
- Legislature: National Assembly of Quebec
- District created: 1867
- District abolished: 1939
- District re-created: 1944
- District re-abolished: 1972
- First contested: 1867
- Last contested: 1970

Kamouraska (French pronunciation: [kamuʁaska]) was a provincial electoral district in the Bas-Saint-Laurent region of Quebec, Canada.

It was created for the 1867 election (and an electoral district of that name existed earlier in the Legislative Assembly of the Province of Canada and the Legislative Assembly of Lower Canada). It disappeared in the 1939 election and its successor electoral district was Kamouraska-Rivière-du-Loup; however, Kamouraska-Rivière-du-Loup existed for only that one election and disappeared in 1944, and was replaced by the re-created Kamouraska.

Its final election was in 1970. It disappeared in the 1973 election and its successor electoral district was Kamouraska-Témiscouata.

== Members of the Legislative Assembly / National Assembly ==
- Vacant (1867–1869)
- Charles-François Roy, Conservative Party (1869–1877)
- Joseph Dumont, Liberal (1877–1878)
- Charles-Antoine-Ernest Gagnon, Liberal (1878–1890)
- Charles-Alfred Desjardins, Conservative Party (1890–1897)
- Louis-Rodolphe Roy, Liberal (1897–1909)
- Louis-Auguste Dupuis, Liberal (1909–1912)
- Charles-Adolphe Stein, Liberal (1912–1920)
- Nérée Morin, Liberal (1920–1927)
- Pierre Gagnon, Liberal (1927–1936)
- René Chaloult, Union Nationale (1936–1939)
- did not exist (1939–1944), see Kamouraska–Rivière-du-Loup
- Louis Philippe Lizotte, Liberal (1944–1948)
- Alfred Plourde, Union Nationale (1948–1962)
- Gérard Dallaire, Liberal (1962–1966)
- Adélard D'Anjou, Union Nationale (1966–1970)
- Jean-Marie Pelletier, Liberal (1970–1973)
