= Ernest Lapointe =

Canadian politician (1876–1941)

The Right Honourable Ernest Lapointe PC
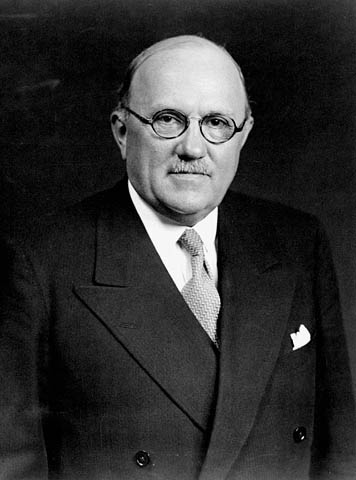

Minister of Justice Attorney General of Canada
- In office October 23, 1935 – November 26, 1941
- Prime Minister: W. L. Mackenzie King
- Preceded by: George Reginald Geary
- Succeeded by: Joseph-Enoil Michaud (acting)
- In office September 25, 1926 – August 6, 1930
- Prime Minister: W. L. Mackenzie King
- Preceded by: Esioff-Léon Patenaude
- Succeeded by: Hugh Guthrie
- In office January 30, 1924 – June 28, 1926; Acting: January 4, 1924 – January 29, 1924
- Prime Minister: W. L. Mackenzie King
- Preceded by: Lomer Gouin
- Succeeded by: Hugh Guthrie (acting)

Secretary of State of Canada
- In office March 24, 1926 – June 28, 1926 (acting)
- Prime Minister: W. L. Mackenzie King
- Preceded by: Charles Murphy (Acting)
- Succeeded by: George Halsey Perley
- In office July 26, 1939 – May 8, 1940 (acting)
- Prime Minister: W. L. Mackenzie King
- Preceded by: Fernand Rinfret
- Succeeded by: Pierre-François Casgrain

Member of Parliament for Quebec East
- In office October 27, 1919 – November 26, 1941
- Preceded by: Wilfrid Laurier
- Succeeded by: Louis St. Laurent

Member of Parliament for Kamouraska
- In office February 12, 1904 – October 14, 1919
- Preceded by: Henry George Carroll
- Succeeded by: Charles-Adolphe Stein

Personal details
- Born: October 6, 1876 Saint-Éloi, Quebec, Canada
- Died: November 26, 1941 (aged 65)
- Party: Liberal
- Spouse: Emma Pratte (m. 1904)
- Relations: Arthur-Joseph Lapointe (nephew)
- Children: Hugues Lapointe
- Education: Laval University
- Occupation: Lawyer

Ernest Lapointe PC (October 6, 1876 – November 26, 1941) was a Canadian lawyer and politician. A member of Parliament from Quebec City, he was a senior minister in the government of Prime Minister W. L. Mackenzie King, playing an important role on issues relating to legal affairs, Quebec and French-speaking Canada.

== Education, early career ==
Lapointe earned his law degree from Laval University. He was called to the bar in 1898 and practiced law in Rivière-du-Loup and Quebec City.

== Enters politics ==
Lapointe was elected by acclamation to the House of Commons of Canada for the riding of Kamouraska as a Liberal through a by-election on February 12, 1904. Lapointe was later re-elected in the 1904, 1908, 1911, and 1917 federal elections.

Lapointe resigned his seat in 1919 and successfully ran in the Quebec East seat vacated by former Prime Minister Wilfrid Laurier, who died.

== King's cabinet minister and Quebec lieutenant ==
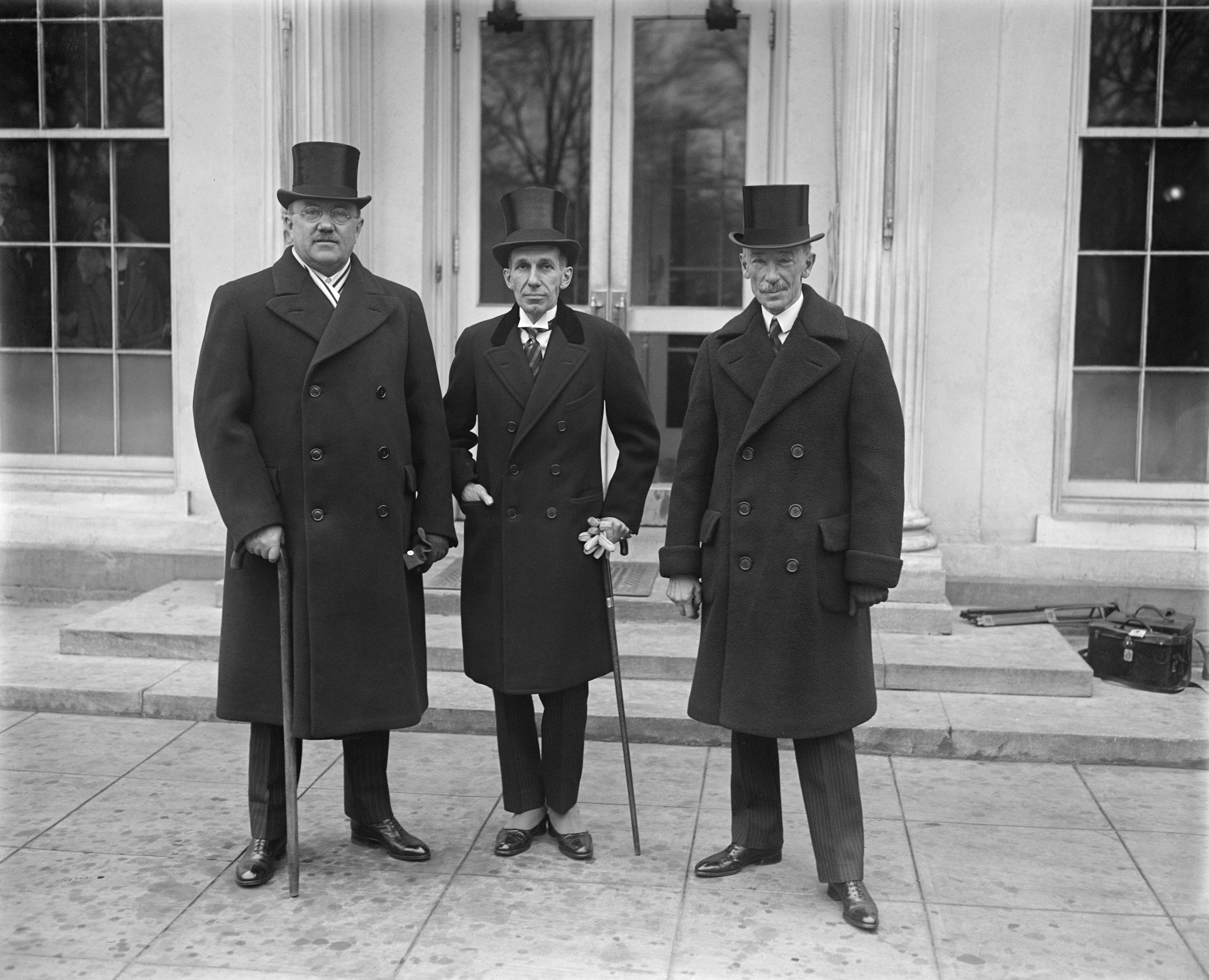
Justice Minister Ernest Lapointe with Canadian Ambassador to the United States Vincent Massey, and Quebec Premier Louis-Alexandre Taschereau at the White House in 1927.

In 1921, Prime Minister William Lyon Mackenzie King appointed Lapointe to his cabinet as minister of marine and fisheries. During his tenure as minister, Lapointe reduced tariffs. In 1924, Lapointe became minister of justice, and served in that position until the Liberals' defeat at the polls in 1930. However, the Liberals under King returned back to power in the 1935 federal election, and Lapointe once again regained his old post. From 1924 to 1930 as justice minister, Lapointe expressed his support for King's commitment to Canadian autonomy and accompanied him at the Imperial Conference of 1926. Lapointe also chaired the Canadian delegation in the discussions that led to the Statute of Westminster in 1931.

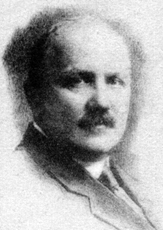
Lapointe, 1936

Lapointe served as King's Quebec lieutenant and was one of the most important ministers in Cabinet. King did not speak French; he relied on Lapointe to handle important matters in the province. Lapointe gave a strong Quebecker voice to the cabinet decision, something that had not existed since the defeat of Laurier in 1911.

In the late 1930s, Lapointe recommended that the federal Cabinet disallow several Acts passed by the Alberta Social Credit government of William Aberhart, arguing that Aberhart was attempting to grab too much power and encroach upon federal jurisdiction.

Lapointe did not recommend disallowance of the Padlock Act passed by the Quebec government of Maurice Duplessis, fearing that doing so would only aid the Union Nationale government.

=== Conscription issue ===
Lapointe helped draft Mackenzie King's policy against conscription for overseas service in 1939, and his campaigning helped defeat the Duplessis provincial government in 1939. During the 1939 provincial election, Lapointe made many speeches in the province of Quebec, in which he argued that if Duplessis was to be re-elected, every French Canadian minister would resign from the federal cabinet, leaving it without a francophone voice. Having been a Liberal MP during the 1917 conscription crisis, Lapointe knew how much a new crisis like the last one would destroy the national unity that Mackenzie King had tried to build since 1921. Duplessis lost in a landslide to Liberal Party of Quebec leader Adélard Godbout, who sought to co-operate with the federal government.

== Death ==
Lapointe died in office in 1941, in the midst of the war. King decided to appoint the reluctant Quebec leading lawyer Louis St. Laurent to the cabinet as the new minister of justice.

Lapointe's son, Hugues Lapointe, served as a member of parliament from 1940 to 1957 and lieutenant governor of Quebec from 1966 to 1978.

== Archives ==
There is an Ernest Lapointe fonds at Library and Archives Canada.

== Electoral record ==
By-election on 27 October 1919 On Laurier's death, 17 February 1919
Party	Candidate	Votes
Opposition (Laurier Liberals)	Ernest Lapointe	6,222
Parti nationaliste	François-Xavier Galibois	2,283

1921 Canadian federal election: Quebec East
Party	Candidate	Votes
Liberal	Ernest Lapointe	9,005
Conservative	Rodolphe-Alfred Drapeau	1,424

By-election on 19 January 1922 On Lapointe's acceptance of an office of emolument under the Crown, 3 January 1922
Party	Candidate	Votes
Liberal	Ernest Lapointe	acclaimed

1925 Canadian federal election: Quebec East
Party	Candidate	Votes
Liberal	Ernest Lapointe	9,193
Conservative	Pierre Audet	6,366

1926 Canadian federal election: Quebec East
Party	Candidate	Votes
Liberal	Ernest Lapointe	9,370
Conservative	Pierre Audet	6,438

By-election on 2 November 1926 On Lapointe's acceptance of an office of emolument under the Crown, 5 October 1926
Party	Candidate	Votes
Liberal	Ernest Lapointe	acclaimed

1930 Canadian federal election: Quebec East
Party	Candidate	Votes
Liberal	Ernest Lapointe	11,822
Conservative	Alleyn Taschereau	9,642

1935 Canadian federal election: Quebec East
Party	Candidate	Votes
Liberal	Ernest Lapointe	15,557
Conservative	Edgar Champoux	9,611

1940 Canadian federal election: Quebec East
Party	Candidate	Votes
Liberal	Ernest Lapointe	17,914
Independent Nationalist	Paul Bouchard	12,302

== See also ==
- Conscription Crisis of 1944
