= Joseph Dumont =

Canadian politician

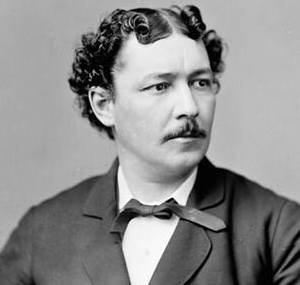

Member of the Canadian Parliament for Kamouraska
- In office 1878–1882
- Preceded by: Charles-François Roy
- Succeeded by: Charles Bruno Blondeau

Member of the Legislative Assembly of Quebec for Kamouraska
- In office 1877–1878
- Preceded by: Charles-François Roy
- Succeeded by: Charles-Antoine-Ernest Gagnon

Personal details
- Born: April 19, 1847 St-André de Kamouraska, Canada East
- Died: January 15, 1912 (aged 64) Quebec City, Quebec
- Party: Liberal
- Other political affiliations: Quebec Liberal Party

Joseph Dumont (April 19, 1847 – January 15, 1912) was a merchant and political figure in Quebec. He represented Kamouraska in the Legislative Assembly of Quebec from 1877 to 1878 and Kamouraska in the House of Commons of Canada from 1878 to 1882 as a Liberal member.

== Biography ==
He was born in Saint-André, Quebec, the son of Lifsey Dumont and Émilie Saint-Pierre, and was educated at Sainte-Anne-de-la-Pocatière. In 1869, he was named a papal zouave at Rome. Dumont was a merchant at Kamouraska. He was elected to the provincial assembly in 1877 after Charles-François Roy was elected to the House of Commons; his election was overturned in March of the following year. Dumont was married twice: to Cléophile Paradis in 1874 and to Marie-Eugénie Gagnon in 1889. He lived in the United States from 1882 to 1887. On his return, he became archivist for the Secretariat of Quebec, serving until 1909, when he was named deputy secretary for the province. In the same year, he was named a knight in the Order of St. Gregory the Great. Dumont died in Quebec City at the age of 64.
