= Narcisse Pérodeau =

Canadian politician

The Honourable Narcisse Pérodeau
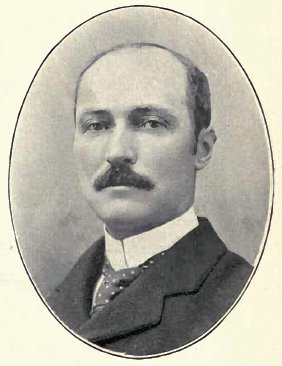

Member of the Legislative Council of Quebec for Sorel
- In office December 23, 1897 – January 8, 1924
- Preceded by: Joseph-Adolphe Dorion
- Succeeded by: Pamphile Réal Du Tremblay

14th Lieutenant Governor of Quebec
- In office January 8, 1924 – January 10, 1929
- Monarch: George V
- Governors General: The Viscount Byng of Vimy; The Viscount Willingdon
- Premier: Louis-Alexandre Taschereau
- Preceded by: Louis-Philippe Brodeur
- Succeeded by: Lomer Gouin

Member of the Legislative Council of Quebec for Montarville
- In office November 28, 1929 – November 18, 1932
- Preceded by: Joseph-Léonide Perron
- Succeeded by: Gustave Lemieux

Personal details
- Born: March 26, 1851 Saint-Ours, Canada East
- Died: November 18, 1932 (aged 81) Montreal, Quebec, Canada
- Resting place: Notre Dame des Neiges Cemetery
- Party: Liberal
- Spouse: Marie-Louise Buckley (m. 1883)
- Education: Laval University
- Occupation: lawyer, financier, professor
- Profession: politician

Narcisse Pérodeau (March 26, 1851 – November 18, 1932) was a lawyer, financier, politician, professor and the 14th Lieutenant Governor of Quebec. He was born in Saint-Ours, Canada East, and died in Montreal.

After several years of private practice, Pérodeau taught law at Laval University from 1898 to 1930. He was also active in finance as vice-president of La Sauvegarde insurance company and serving on the boards of the Mount Royal Assurance Company, the Trans-Canada Insurance Company and several other institutions.

He was appointed to the Legislative Council of Quebec (the upper house of the Quebec legislature) and represented Sorel from 1897 to 1924 as a supporter of the Liberal Party of Quebec.

In 1910, Pérodeau was appointed minister without portfolio in the cabinet of Premier Lomer Gouin. Premier Louis-Alexandre Taschereau promoted him to leader of the government in the Legislative Council in 1920. He served in this position until 1924, when he was appointed lieutenant-governor, an office he held from 10 Jan. 1924 to 10 Jan. 1929.

Pérodeau served as the King's representative in Quebec until 1929. He was then reappointed to the Legislative Council for the division of Montarville and rejoined the Taschereau cabinet in his former position as leader of government in the upper house.

He died in office at the age of 81 and was entombed at the Notre Dame des Neiges Cemetery in Montreal.
