= Pamphile Réal Du Tremblay =

Canadian politician (1879–1955)

The Hon. Pamphile Réal Blaise Nugent Du Tremblay
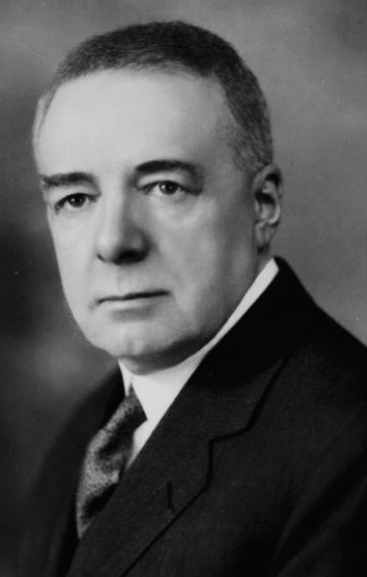

Member of the Canadian Parliament for Laurier—Outremont
- In office 1917–1921
- Succeeded by: Lomer Gouin

Member of the Legislative Council of Quebec for Sorel
- In office 1925–1955
- Preceded by: Narcisse Pérodeau
- Succeeded by: Jean Barrette

Senator for Repentigny, Quebec
- In office 1942–1955
- Appointed by: William Lyon Mackenzie King
- Preceded by: Joseph Hormisdas Rainville
- Succeeded by: J.-Eugène Lefrançois

Personal details
- Born: March 5, 1879 Sainte-Anne-de-la-Pérade, Quebec
- Died: October 6, 1955 (aged 76) Montreal, Quebec
- Resting place: Notre Dame des Neiges Cemetery
- Party: Liberal
- Other political affiliations: Quebec Liberal Party

Pamphile Réal Blaise Nugent Du Tremblay (March 5, 1879 – October 6, 1955) was a Canadian lawyer, businessman and politician.

Du Tremblay was born in Sainte-Anne-de-la-Pérade, Quebec and educated at Laval University and McGill. He was admitted to the Quebec bar in 1901. He practiced in Montreal and was appointed King's Counsel in 1917.

He was elected to the House of Commons of Canada as a Laurier Liberal in the 1917 wartime election held during the Conscription crisis of 1917 and defeated Secretary of State Pierre Édouard Blondin. He represented Laurier—Outremont in parliament for four years and did not stand for re-election in 1921.

In 1925, he was appointed to the Legislative Council of Quebec which was the upper house of the provincial legislature as a member of the Liberal Party of Quebec. He sat in the body until 1942 when he was appointed to the Senate of Canada as a federal Liberal. He remained in the body until his death in 1955 at the age of 76.

In his business life he served as president of La Prévoyance insurance company from 1930 to 1936 and was also involved with publishing as president of the newspaper La Presse from 1932 to 1955 and president of the newspaper La Patrie from 1933 to 1955. He was also president of the Canadian Printing and Lithographing Co Ltd and of Provident Adjustment and Investing and was also a director of the Canadian Forestry Association. He was created a chevalier of France's Légion d'honneur in 1925 and was awarded the gold medal of the Académie française in 1930.

After his death in 1955, he was entombed at the Notre Dame des Neiges Cemetery in Montreal.
