= Laurier—Outremont =

Former federal electoral district in Quebec, Canada

Quebec electoral district

Defunct federal electoral district
- Legislature: House of Commons
- District created: 1914
- District abolished: 1933
- First contested: 1917
- Last contested: 1930

Laurier—Outremont was a federal electoral district in Quebec, Canada, that was represented in the House of Commons of Canada from 1917 to 1935.

This riding was created in 1914 from parts of Jacques Cartier, St. Antoine and St. Lawrence ridings.

It initially consisted of Laurier and Outremont wards, Côte-des-Neiges ward, the town of Mount Royal, Mount Royal ward and Mount Royal Park of the city of Montreal.

In 1924, it was redefined to consist of the city of Outremont, and the part of the city of Montreal bounded by a line starting from the north-eastern boundary of the city of Outremont, following Mount Royal Avenue, Henri Julien Avenue, Mozart Street, Drolet Street, the extension of Isabeau Street. St. Lawrence Boulevard, Baby Street, the Canadian Pacific Railway track, Atlantic Avenue, to the northern limit of the city of Outremont, and along that boundary to Mount Royal Avenue.

The electoral district was abolished in 1933 when it was divided into Laurier and Outremont ridings.

== Members of Parliament ==
This riding elected the following members of Parliament:

Parliament	Years	Member	Party
Laurier—Outremont; Riding created from Jacques Cartier, St. Antoine and St. Lawrence
13th	1917–1921	Pamphile Réal Du Tremblay	Opposition (Laurier Liberals)
14th	1921–1921	Lomer Gouin	Liberal
14th	1922–1925	Lomer Gouin	Liberal
15th	1925–1926	Joseph-Alexandre Mercier	Liberal
16th	1926–1930	Joseph-Alexandre Mercier	Liberal
17th	1930–1935	Joseph-Alexandre Mercier	Liberal
Riding dissolved into Laurier and Outremont

== Election results ==
1917 Canadian federal election
Party	Candidate	Votes
Opposition (Laurier Liberals)	Pamphile Réal Du Tremblay	7,443
Government (Unionist)	Pierre-Édouard Blondin	6,196

1921 Canadian federal election
Party	Candidate	Votes
Liberal	Lomer Gouin	15,341
Conservative	Joseph-Alfred Nadeau	5,023
Labour	Alfred Mathieu	1,289

By-election: Acceptance by the Honourable Sir Lomer Gouin of an office of emolument under the Crown, 29 December 1921

By-election on 19 January 1922
Party	Candidate	Votes
Liberal	Lomer Gouin	acclaimed

1925 Canadian federal election
Party	Candidate	Votes
Liberal	Joseph-Alexandre Mercier	12,889
Conservative	Rodolphe Monty	10,105

1926 Canadian federal election
Party	Candidate	Votes
Liberal	Joseph-Alexandre Mercier	12,724
Conservative	Jean-Édouard-Charles Bumbray	8,342

1930 Canadian federal election
Party	Candidate	Votes
Liberal	Joseph-Alexandre Mercier	15,259
Conservative	Hector-Frédéric Fortier	7,590
Liberal Protectionist	Lyon Williams Jacobs	2,723
Independent Conservative	John Alexander Shinnick	1,236

== See also ==
- List of Canadian electoral districts
- Historical federal electoral districts of Canada
