= Louis Philippe Lizotte =

Canadian politician (1891–1972)

Louis Philippe Lizotte (July 13, 1891 – May 18, 1972) was a Canadian political figure from Quebec.

He was born in Saint-Pacôme, Quebec and was educated at Laval University where he earned a law degree. He was admitted to the Quebec bar in 1919 and became King's Counsel in 1927.

Lizotte practiced law in Rivière-du-Loup until 1956 in partnership with provincial politician Léon Casgrain and senior federal cabinet minister Ernest Lapointe.

He served as mayor of Rivière-du-Loup from 1935 until 1939 and was elected to the House of Commons of Canada as the Liberal Member of Parliament for Kamouraska in the 1940 federal election. He resigned his seat in 1944 in order to enter provincial politics and was elected to the Legislative Assembly of Quebec as a Quebec Liberal Party MLA in the 1944 provincial election. He represented the provincial district of Kamouraska until his defeat in the 1948 provincial election.

Lizotte was appointed to the Quebec Superior Court in 1956 and sat as a judge for ten years.
