= Montréal Antifasciste =

Quebec antifa group

Montréal Antifasciste is a militant far-left anti-fascist group. It mainly operates in the Montreal area but also operates across Quebec.

== History ==
Montréal Antifasciste was founded in 2017. The group's stated purpose is to counter the rise of groups in Quebec that it deems to be "far-right". Some of these groups are Atalante, the Nouvelle Alliance, the Front patriotique du Québec, La Meute, the Second Sons, Diagolon, and the Frontenac Active Club. The group also works to identify members of far-right groups in the Montreal area.

=== Ideology ===
Montréal Antifasciste includes members who identify as marxists, anarchists and communists. The group is also anti-Quebec nationalism and has claimed responsibility for the vandalism of statues of historical figures in Montreal.

=== Actions ===
On 19 May 2025, Montréal Antifasciste organized a counter protest known as the "Fête populaire contre le fascisme" (or the "People’s Anti-Fascist Festival) against the Nouvelle Alliance's annual commemoration of hero of New France Adam Dollard des Ormeaux at his statue in Montreal’s Parc La Fontaine. The counter protesters brought loudspeakers and waved antifa flags, pride flags, and Palestine flags. The Service de police de la Ville de Montréal kept the two groups from fighting. Throughout the confrontation, the counter protesters chanted "Pas de facho dans nos quartiers!" (English: "No fascists in our streets!") while 50 members of the Nouvelle Alliance chanted "Le Québec aux Québécois!" (English: "Quebec for Quebecers"), "Québec libre!" (English: "Free Quebec!") and "Patrie, nation, tradition!" (English: "Fatherland, nation, tradition!")

==== Political violence ====
In 2017, CBC alleged that members of the group injured a 42-year-old man who they believed to be associated with the far-right nationalist and islamophobic group La Meute.
