= Lomer Gouin =

Premier and lieutenant governor of Quebec (1861–1929)

The Honourable Sir Lomer Gouin PC KCMG
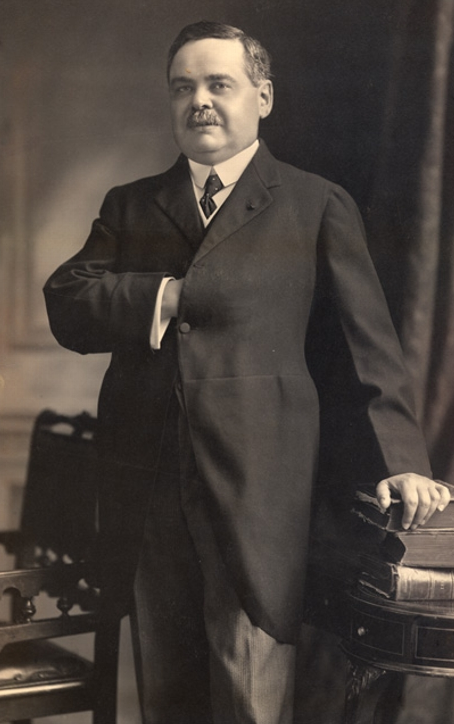

13th Premier of Quebec
- In office 23 March 1905 – 8 July 1920
- Monarchs: Edward VII; George V
- Lieutenant Governor: Louis-Amable Jetté; Charles Alphonse Pantaléon Pelletier; François Langelier; Pierre-Évariste Leblanc; Charles Fitzpatrick
- Preceded by: Simon-Napoléon Parent
- Succeeded by: Louis-Alexandre Taschereau

15th Lieutenant Governor of Quebec
- In office 10 January 1929 – 28 March 1929
- Monarch: George V
- Governor General: The Earl of Willingdon
- Premier: Louis-Alexandre Taschereau
- Preceded by: Narcisse Pérodeau
- Succeeded by: Henry George Carroll

MNA for Montréal no. 2
- In office 11 May 1897 – 8 June 1908
- Preceded by: Olivier-Maurice Augé
- Succeeded by: Henri Bourassa

MNA for Portneuf
- In office 8 June 1908 – 8 July 1920
- Preceded by: Édouard-Antill Panet
- Succeeded by: Édouard Hamel

MNA for Saint-Jean
- In office 15 May 1912 – 10 November 1913
- Preceded by: Marcellin Robert
- Succeeded by: Marcellin Robert

Member of Legislative Council for De Salaberry
- In office 8 July 1920 – 6 December 1921
- Appointed by: Charles Fitzpatrick

Member of Parliament for Laurier—Outremont
- In office 6 December 1921 – 29 October 1925
- Preceded by: Pamphile-Réal Du Tremblay
- Succeeded by: Joseph-Alexandre Mercier

Personal details
- Born: Jean Lomer Gouin; 19 March 1861 Saint-Charles-des-Grondines (Grondines), Canada East
- Died: 28 March 1929 (aged 68) Quebec City, Quebec
- Party: Liberal
- Spouse(s): Éliza Mercier; Alice Amos
- Profession: Lawyer

Sir Jean Lomer Gouin PC KCMG (19 March 1861 – 28 March 1929) was a Canadian politician. He served as 13th premier of Quebec, as a Cabinet minister in the federal government of Canada, and as the 15th lieutenant governor of Quebec.

== Biography ==
He was born in Grondines, Quebec to Dr. Joseph-Nérée Gouin, a doctor and Séraphine Fugère and was educated at Sorel College, Lévis College and Laval University in Montreal. He was called to the Bar in 1884. He practised with people heavily involved in Canadian and Quebec politics: Honoré Mercier, whose daughter he married, Louis-Olivier Taillon, Raymond Préfontaine, Joseph-Émery Robidoux, Louis-Philippe Bérard and Rodolphe Lemieux. He represented major railway companies. He was President of the Quebec Bar in 1910 and 1911. On 24 May 1888, he married Éliza Mercier, daughter of Honoré Mercier. Their son, Paul Gouin, later led the Action libérale nationale party.

He began his long political career by losing as a Liberal candidate in the riding of Richelieu in the 1891 federal election. His first electoral success came in 1897 when he was elected MNA for Montréal No. 2. He was re-elected in 1900 and 1904. He held the positions of Commissioner of Public Works (1900-1901), then Minister of Colonization and Public Works (1901-1905) in the cabinet of Simon-Napoléon Parent. Along with his colleagues Alexander Weir and Adélard Turgeon, he resigned with a view to overthrowing Parent, who had to leave in the face of this rebellion in his own party. He was appointed Premier of Quebec on 23 March 1905, a position he held until his resignation in 1920, while also holding the position of Attorney General (1905-1919) and, briefly, Minister of Colonization, Mines and Fisheries in 1907. In the 1908 election, faced with a surge of nationalists led by Henri Bourassa and Armand Lavergne, he ran in both Portneuf and Saint-Hyacinthe, as the law of the day allowed. He was elected in the first constituency and defeated by Bourassa in the second. Re-elected in both Portneuf and Saint-Jean in 1912, he chose Portneuf and was re-elected there in 1916 and 1919. He was responsible for the Workmen's Compensation Act, passed in 1909, the incorporation of Ungava into Quebec in 1912 and the Good Roads Act. He created the Ministère de la Voirie in 1912. He reorganised municipal administration in Montreal and developed education by creating normal schools for girls and technical schools in Montreal and Quebec City. He was also responsible for the École des hautes études commerciales in Montreal, the École centrale de préparation et d'arpentage and the École forestières opened in 1907 at Université Laval.

In 1920, he was appointed to the Legislative Council as the representative for the Salaberry division. He resigned the following year to run successfully as a Liberal candidate in the federal riding of Laurier—Outremont in the general election. William Lyon Mackenzie King's Liberals then took power and Gouin was appointed Minister of Justice (1921-1924). He did not stand for re-election in 1925 and returned to the practice of law while sitting on the boards of directors of numerous companies.

He was appointed Lieutenant-Governor on 10 January 1929. On the following 18 March, while in Parliament to prorogue a session that was running late, he suffered a heart attack and died in his office. His death caused a stir.

Lomer Gouin is interred in the Notre Dame des Neiges Cemetery in Montreal.

== Elections as party leader ==
He won the 1908 election, 1912 election, 1916 election and 1919 election and resigned in 1920.

== Honours ==
Many sites and landmarks were named to honour Lomer Gouin. They include:

- Gouin Boulevard, the longest street on the Island of Montreal;
- Gouin Reservoir (In French: Réservoir Gouin), a man-made collection of lakes in the center of the province of Quebec;
- Rue Gouin (Gouin Street) and Place Gouin, located in Shawinigan, Quebec, Canada;
- Rue Gouin (Gouin Street), located in Gatineau, Quebec, Canada;
- The provincial district of Gouin;
- Lomer-Gouin, intra-provincial ferry services between Levis to Quebec City operate by Société des traversiers du Québec.

1891 Canadian federal election: Richelieu
| Party | Candidate | Votes |
|---|---|---|
| Conservative | Hector-Louis Langevin | 1,701 |
| Liberal | Lomer Gouin | 1,393 |

== See also ==
- List of Quebec general elections
- Politics of Quebec
- Provincial premiers who have become Canadian MPs
- Timeline of Quebec history

Political offices
| Preceded by Henry Thomas Duffy | Minister of Public Works; 1900–1905 | Succeeded by Dominique Monet |
| Preceded by R. B. Bennett | Minister of Justice; 1921–1924 | Succeeded by Ernest Lapointe |
