= Kamouraska (federal electoral district) =

Former federal electoral district in Quebec, Canada

Coordinates: 47.565°N 69.866°W

Quebec electoral district

Defunct federal electoral district
- Legislature: House of Commons
- District created: 1867
- District abolished: 1976
- First contested: 1869 by-election
- Last contested: 1979

Kamouraska (French pronunciation: [kamuʁaska]) was a federal electoral district in Quebec, Canada, that was represented in the House of Commons of Canada from 1869 to 1979. It was created by the British North America Act, 1867. There was no election in 1867 due to riots. There was a by-election held in 1869 in its place. The district was abolished in 1976 when it was redistributed into Bellechasse, Kamouraska—Rivière-du-Loup and Rimouski ridings.

== Members of Parliament ==
This riding elected the following members of Parliament:

Parliament	Years	Member	Party
Kamouraska
1st	1867–1869	Vacant	Vacant
1st	1869–1872	Charles-Alphonse-Pantaléon Pelletier	Liberal
2nd	1872–1874	Charles-Alphonse-Pantaléon Pelletier	Liberal
3rd	1874–1877	Charles-Alphonse-Pantaléon Pelletier	Liberal
3rd	1877–1878	Charles-François Roy	Conservative
4th	1878–1882	Joseph Dumont	Liberal
5th	1882–1887	Charles Bruno Blondeau	Conservative
6th	1887–1891	Alexis Dessaint	Liberal
7th	1891–1896	Henry George Carroll	Liberal
8th	1896–1900	Henry George Carroll	Liberal
9th	1900–1902	Henry George Carroll	Liberal
9th	1902–1904	Henry George Carroll	Liberal
9th	1904–1904	Ernest Lapointe	Liberal
10th	1904–1908	Ernest Lapointe	Liberal
11th	1908–1911	Ernest Lapointe	Liberal
12th	1911–1917	Ernest Lapointe	Liberal
13th	1917–1919	Ernest Lapointe	Opposition (Laurier Liberals)
13th	1920–1921	Charles-Adolphe Stein	Liberal
14th	1921–1922	Charles-Adolphe Stein	Liberal
14th	1922–1925	Joseph Georges Bouchard	Liberal
15th	1925–1926	Joseph Georges Bouchard	Liberal
16th	1926–1930	Joseph Georges Bouchard	Liberal
17th	1930–1935	Joseph Georges Bouchard	Liberal
18th	1935–1940	Joseph Georges Bouchard	Liberal
19th	1940–1945	Louis Philippe Lizotte	Liberal
20th	1945–1949	Eugène Marquis	Liberal
21st	1949–1949	Eugène Marquis	Liberal
21st	1949–1953	Arthur Massé	Independent Liberal
22nd	1953–1957	Arthur Massé	Independent Liberal
23rd	1957–1958	Benoît Chabot	Independent
24th	1958–1962	Charles Richard	Progressive Conservative
25th	1962–1963	Charles-Eugène Dionne	Social Credit
26th	1963–1965	Charles-Eugène Dionne	Social Credit
27th	1965–1968	Charles-Eugène Dionne	Ralliement créditiste
28th	1968–1971	Charles-Eugène Dionne	Ralliement créditiste
28th	1971–1972	Charles-Eugène Dionne	Social Credit
29th	1972–1974	Charles-Eugène Dionne	Social Credit
30th	1974–1979	Charles-Eugène Dionne	Social Credit
Riding dissolved into Bellechasse, Kamouraska—Rivière-du-Loup and Rimouski

== Election results ==
By-election on 17 February 1869 No return had been made in 1867, due to riots
Party	Candidate	Votes
Liberal	Charles Alphonse Pantaléon Pelletier	1,149
Conservative	Adolphe-Basile Routhier	1,105

1872 Canadian federal election
Party	Candidate	Votes
Liberal	Charles Pantaléon Pelletier	1,143
Conservative	Adolphe-Basile Routhier	1,045

1874 Canadian federal election
Party	Candidate	Votes
Liberal	Charles Alphonse Pantaléon Pelletier	acclaimed

By-election on 19 February 1877 On Mr. Pelletier being called to the Senate, 2 February 1877
Party	Candidate	Votes
Conservative	Charles-François Roy	acclaimed

1878 Canadian federal election
Party	Candidate	Votes
Liberal	Joseph Dumont	1,254
Conservative	Charles-François Roy	1,245

1882 Canadian federal election
Party	Candidate	Votes
Conservative	Charles Bruno Blondeau	1,107
Unknown	G. Bouchard	1,089

1887 Canadian federal election
Party	Candidate	Votes
Liberal	A. Dessaint	1,518
Conservative	Charles Bruno Blondeau	1,261

1891 Canadian federal election
Party	Candidate	Votes
Liberal	Henry George Carroll	1,506
Conservative	J.A. Thomas Chapais	1,411

1896 Canadian federal election
Party	Candidate	Votes
Liberal	Henry George Carroll	1,414
Conservative	Linière Taschereau	1,403

1900 Canadian federal election
Party	Candidate	Votes
Liberal	Henry George Carroll	1,564
Conservative	Linière Taschereau	1,383

By-election on 28 February 1902 On Mr. Carroll being appointed Solicitor General, 10 February 1902
Party	Candidate	Votes
Liberal	Henry George Carroll	acclaimed

By-election on 12 February 1904 On Mr. Carroll being appointed Judge, 29 January 1904
Party	Candidate	Votes
Liberal	Ernest Lapointe	acclaimed

1904 Canadian federal election
Party	Candidate	Votes
Liberal	Ernest Lapointe	1,635
Conservative	Jules Langlois	1,419

1908 Canadian federal election
Party	Candidate	Votes
Liberal	Ernest Lapointe	1,860
Conservative	Wilfrid Adélard Potvin	1,546

1911 Canadian federal election
Party	Candidate	Votes
Liberal	Ernest Lapointe	1,840
Conservative	Wilfrid Adélard Potvin	1,754

1917 Canadian federal election
Party	Candidate	Votes
Opposition (Laurier Liberals)	Ernest Lapointe	3,453
Government (Unionist)	Samuel Charles Riou	191

By-election on 31 March 1920 On Mr. Lapointe's resignation, 14 October 1919
Party	Candidate	Votes
Liberal	Charles Adolphe Stein	acclaimed

1921 Canadian federal election
Party	Candidate	Votes
Liberal	Charles Adolphe Stein	4,822
Independent	Joseph Langlais	2,483

By-election on 15 May 1922 Stein accepted an office of emolument from the Crown, 5 May 1922
Party	Candidate	Votes
Liberal	Joseph Georges Bouchard	acclaimed

1925 Canadian federal election
Party	Candidate	Votes
Liberal	Georges Bouchard	4,425
Conservative	Maurice Dupré	2,918

1926 Canadian federal election
Party	Candidate	Votes
Liberal	Georges Bouchard	4,332
Conservative	François-Xavier Pelletier	2,562

1930 Canadian federal election
Party	Candidate	Votes
Liberal	Georges Bouchard	4,534
Conservative	Pierre Audet	4,109

1935 Canadian federal election
Party	Candidate	Votes
Liberal	Georges Bouchard	6,841
Conservative	Charles Richard	3,332
Reconstruction	Joseph-Eleuthère Rousseau	206

1940 Canadian federal election
Party	Candidate	Votes
Liberal	Louis-Philippe Lizotte	6,965
National Government	Thomas-W. Michaud	2,099

1945 Canadian federal election
Party	Candidate	Votes
Liberal	Eugène Marquis	6,829
Independent	P.-Wilfrid Lévesque	3,999
Social Credit	Jean-Robert Ouellet	1,361

1949 Canadian federal election
Party	Candidate	Votes
Liberal	Eugène Marquis	7,792
Union des électeurs	Joseph-Arthur-Émile Bélanger	1,696
Progressive Conservative	Yvon Chamberland	1,437

By-election on 24 October 1949 Marquis accepted an office of emolument from the Crown, 24 August 1949
Party	Candidate	Votes
Independent Liberal	Arthur Massé	6,033
Liberal	Gérard Lévesque	5,230

1953 Canadian federal election
Party	Candidate	Votes
Independent Liberal	Arthur Massé	6,065
Liberal	Jean-Paul Pérusse	5,534
Progressive Conservative	Philippe Lavergne	229

1957 Canadian federal election
Party	Candidate	Votes
Independent	Benoît Chabot	6,489
Liberal	Arthur Massé	5,988

1958 Canadian federal election
Party	Candidate	Votes
Progressive Conservative	Charles Richard	7,691
Liberal	André Rousseau	6,847

1962 Canadian federal election
Party	Candidate	Votes
Social Credit	Charles-Eugène Dionne	4,550
Liberal	Rosaire Anctil	4,165
Progressive Conservative	Charles Richard	3,762

1963 Canadian federal election
Party	Candidate	Votes
Social Credit	Charles-Eugène Dionne	6,286
Liberal	Rosaire Anctil	5,659
Progressive Conservative	Paul-Aimé Michaud	767
New Democratic	Joseph-Eleuthère Rousseau	143

1965 Canadian federal election
Party	Candidate	Votes
Ralliement créditiste	Charles-Eugène Dionne	6,127
Liberal	Lionel Dessureaux	5,639
Progressive Conservative	Paul-Aimé Michaud	300

1968 Canadian federal election
Party	Candidate	Votes
Ralliement créditiste	Charles-Eugène Dionne	8,762
Liberal	Jean-Charles Richard Berger	7,631
Progressive Conservative	J.-Rosario Pelletier	4,996
New Democratic	Lionel Demers	359

1972 Canadian federal election
Party	Candidate	Votes
Social Credit	Charles-Eugène Dionne	14,195
Liberal	Lionel Dessureaux	9,053
Progressive Conservative	Marthe Leclerc	2,842
New Democratic	Yvon Harvey	495

1974 Canadian federal election
Party	Candidate	Votes
Social Credit	Charles-Eugène Dionne	11,664
Liberal	René J. Bernier	9,484
Progressive Conservative	Gontran Bergeron	1,933

== See also ==
- List of Canadian electoral districts
- Historical federal electoral districts of Canada
