= Tråvad =

- Location within Västra Götaland Location within Sweden
- Coordinates: 58°15′N 13°05′E
- Country: Sweden
- Province: Västergötland
- County: Västra Götaland County
- Municipality: Vara Municipality

Area
  - Total: 0.74 km^{2} (0.29 sq mi)

Population (31 December 2010)
  - Total: 448
  - Density: 610/km^{2} (1,600/sq mi)
- Time zone: UTC+1 (CET)
  - Summer (DST): UTC+2 (CEST)
- Climate: Cfb

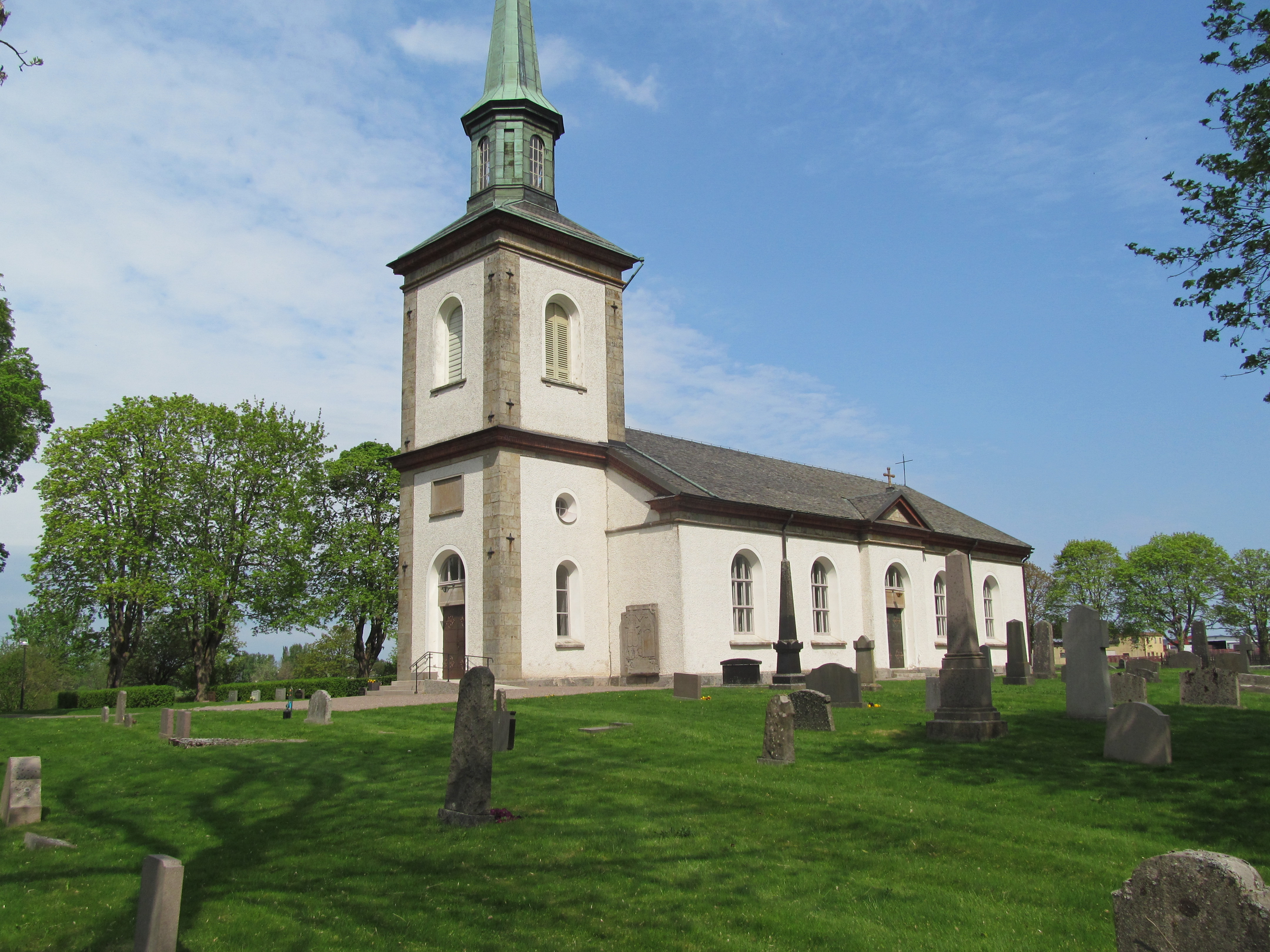
Church in Tråvad

Tråvad is a locality situated in Vara Municipality, Västra Götaland County, Sweden with 448 inhabitants in 2010.
