= Jette Sandahl =

Danish museum director

Jette Sandahl (born 1949) is a Danish curator, museum director and business executive. Founding director of the Women’s Museum of Denmark and the Museum of World Culture in Gothenburg, Sweden, she has more recently served as director of the Museum of Copenhagen. She is currently a member of the European Museum Forum's board of trustees.
