= Charles-Eugène Dionne =

Canadian politician (1908–1984)

- Official 1974 portrait

Member of Parliament for Kamouraska
- In office June 1962 – March 1979

Personal details
- Born: 27 May 1908 Saint-Paschal-de-Kamouraska, Quebec, Canada
- Died: 4 August 1984 (aged 76) La Pocatière, Quebec, Canada
- Party: Social Credit; Ralliement créditiste (1963-1971)
- Profession: lumberjack, labour representative

Charles-Eugène Dionne (27 May 1908 – 4 August 1984) was a Social Credit Party and Ralliement créditiste member of the House of Commons of Canada. He was born in Saint-Paschal-de-Kamouraska and became a lumberjack in his youth. Years later he became a labour representative, eventually leading a chapter of the United Brotherhood of Carpenters and Joiners.

He was first elected at the Kamouraska riding in the 1962 general election and was re-elected there for successive terms until the 1974 election. Ridings were redistributed for the 1979 federal election, and Dionne was defeated by Rosaire Gendron of the Liberal party at the new Kamouraska—Rivière-du-Loup riding. Dionne was also unable to unseat Gendron in the 1980 federal election. Dionne served consecutive terms from the 25th to the 30th Canadian Parliaments, remaining with the Social Credit party, which became known as the Ralliement créditiste from 1963 to 1971.

After his electoral defeat, Dionne became allied with local employment rights group Action-Chomage and continued to work with residents in Saint-Pascal on unemployment concerns.
