= Clerico-nationalism =

Canadian ideological current

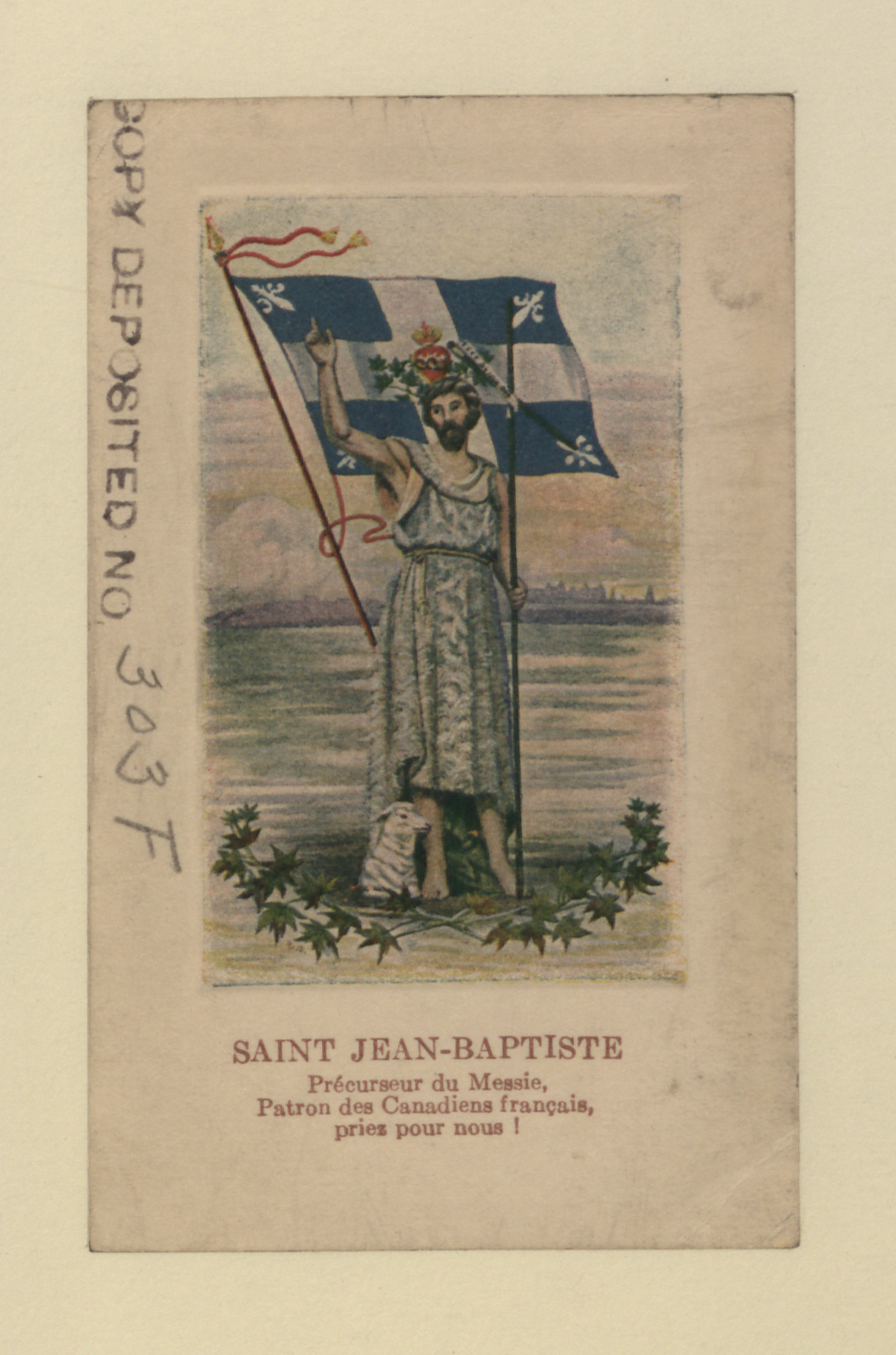
Saint John the Baptist as an allegory of the Canadian people holding the Carillon-Sacré-Coeur in a prayer card.

Clerico-Nationalism, also referred to as traditional French-Canadian nationalism, is an ideological current in Quebec. It was the most dominant form of Quebec Nationalism from the years after World War I until the end of the 1950s, from the premiership of Maurice Duplessis until the Quiet Revolution. Clerico-nationalism is a traditionalist, religious form of French Canadian nationalism focused on the Roman Catholic Church. In France, a similar ideology is referred to as National Catholicism.

== Ideas ==
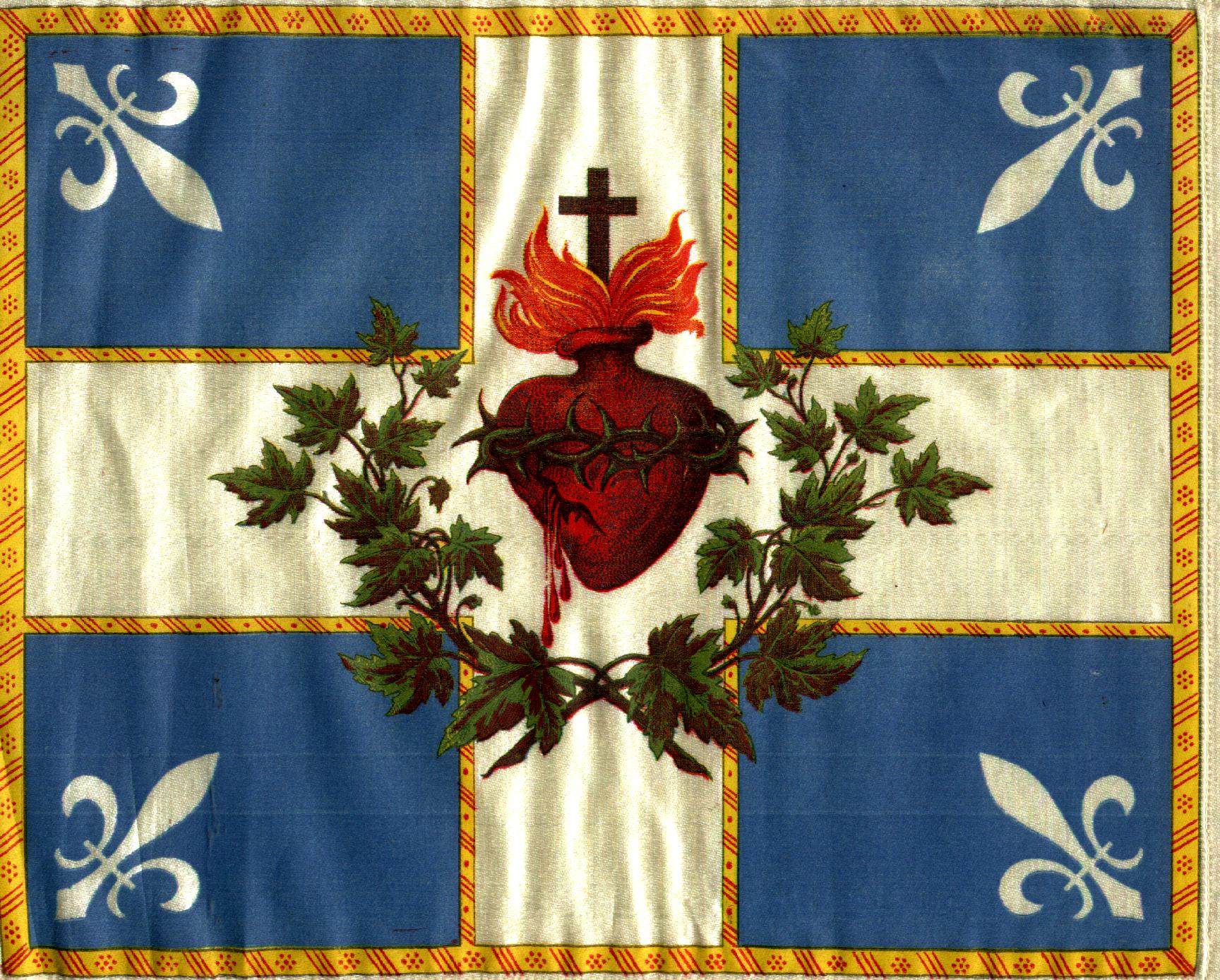
Flag of Quebec displaying the Sacred Heart, promoted by Lionel Groulx as an emblem for Canadian Catholics.

The term clerico-nationalism was coined by Paul-André Linteau. Henri Bourassa publicized clerico-nationalist views, as did the editors of his newspaper Le Devoir, and the League des droits du français (League of French Rights). Clerico-nationalist thinking was most thoroughly developed and spread by Lionel Groulx and the Ligue d'Action française (French Action League), which he led.

Clerico-nationalism was focused on the past. Clerico-nationalists pushed a conservative line in politics and defended the interests of what they called the French Canadian race. Advocates of clerico-nationalism were strictly Catholic and mostly members of the clergy. They defended traditional family values, respect for hierarchy, submission of the wife to the authority of her husband, and natalism. They also defended agriculture and the rural way of life. They were on guard against what they saw as the dangers of the city and praised popular religious education.

Clerico-nationalists also took stands on language and culture. They were purists about the French language, preferring the French spoken in France as the standard form of the language. In terms of culture and literature, Groulx and his fellows were traditionalists and opposed to modernist French and European. They promoted rural, conservative, and nationalist literature which opposed exoticism, art in the Parisian style, or Parnassianism, which was characterized by the study of 'art for art's sake'.

In 1936, Quebec Premier Maurice Duplessis hung a crucifix in the Legislative Assembly Chamber. It would hung there for 83 years, until it was removed on 10 July 2019 A crucifix was also hung in the Quebec City Council chamber in 1936. The crucifix would hung there until 2025. In 1937, a Crucifix was hung in the Montreal city council. The crucifix would hung there until 2019.

His party, the Union Nationale, often had the active support of the Catholic Church during political campaigns, using the slogan Le ciel est bleu; l'enfer est rouge ("Heaven is blue; hell is red"; red is the colour of the Liberal Party, and blue was the colour of the Union Nationale).

== Decline ==
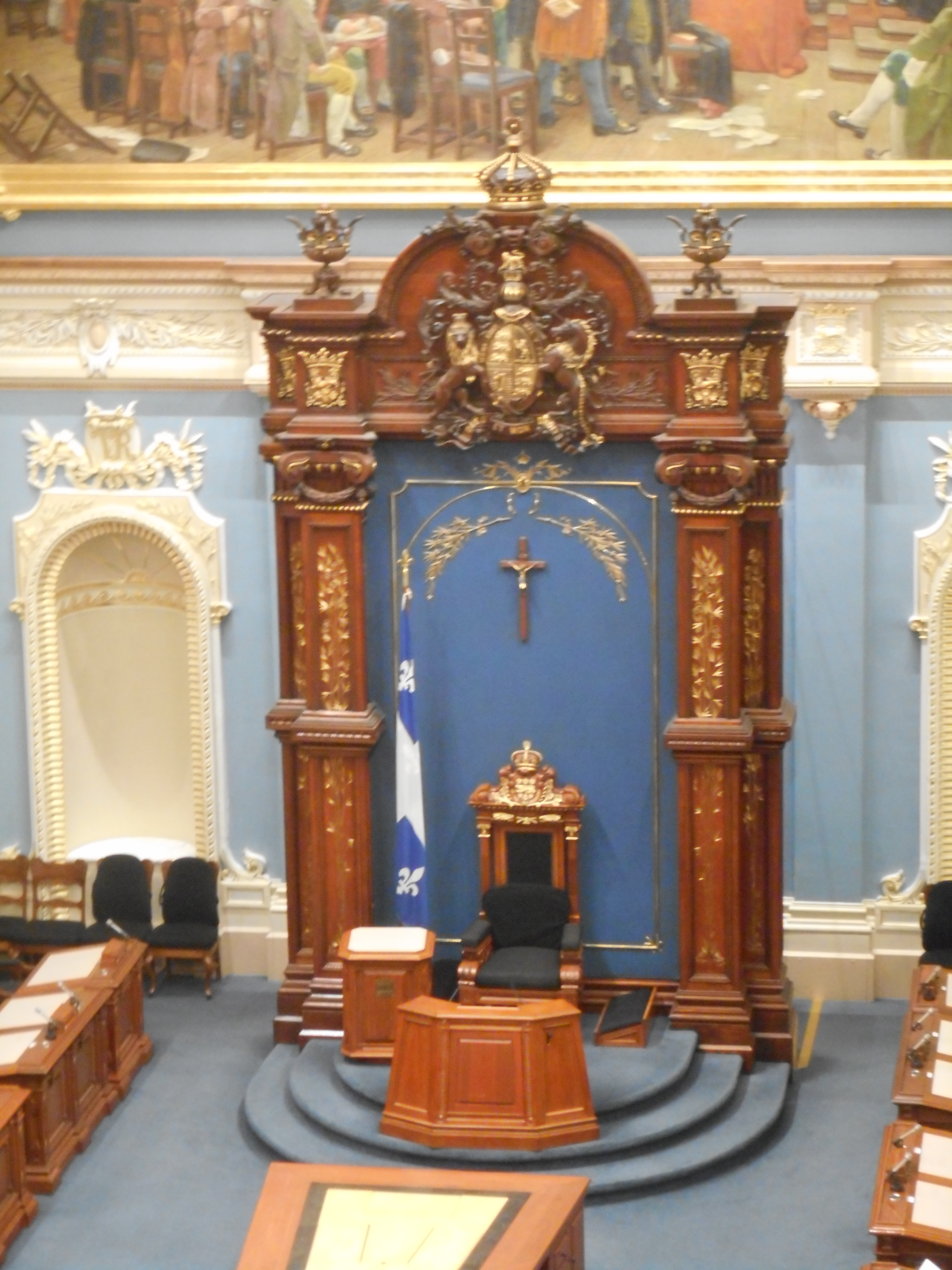
A crucifix hung above the seat of the National Assembly of Quebec from 1936 to 9 July 2019.

Starting in the 1930s, other more radical nationalist ideas (secularist and separatist) began to coalesce. These reduced the influence of Clerico-nationalism. These more radical ideas took hold in the movements inspired by Paul Bouchard and Adrien Arcand, and the group Jeune-Canada (Young Canada).

In the 1940s, opposition to the ideology of Groulx's generation became more vigorous. The young artists of Refus global, centered around Paul-Émile Borduas, strongly rejected clerico-nationalism, which they believed was reactionary. They were modern, anti-clerical, and revolutionary. This opposition had little effect at the time, but the generation of the Quiet Revolution would later rediscover it, opening the door to Marxism and the far left.

After the premiership of Duplessis Clerico-nationalism, often associated with his government, progressively gave way to the liberalism represented by Jean Lesage. However, the ideology represented by Groulx and his successors during close to a quarter century was a major influence on Quebec history in the 20th century. Clerico-nationalism brought together a number of intellectuals and figures from different nationalist milieus in defense of French Canadian tradition against rising liberalism, secularism, urbanization, and capitalism in the often passionate debates that Clerico-nationalism stirred up focused discussion on modernity, the influence of Catholicism on political life, and the idea of progress in Quebec during a turning point in its history.

== Modern day ==
In March 2022, the Nouvelle Alliance was founded. According to the Nouvelle Alliance's president François Gervais, the Nouvelle Alliance represents the "Catholic heritage of Quebec society."

== See also ==
- Parti bleu
- Parti nationaliste chrétien (1967-1970)
- Parti Unité Nationale (2000-2018)

== Bibliography ==
- Paul-André Linteau, René Durocher et Jean-Claude Robert, "Le courant clérico-nationaliste", dans Histoire du Québec contemporain. De la confédération à la crise (1867-1929), Montréal, Boréal, "Compact", 1989, t. 1, p. 700-707.
