= Charles Alphonse Pantaléon Pelletier =

Canadian politician (1837–1911)

The Honourable Sir Charles Pelletier PC KCMG KC
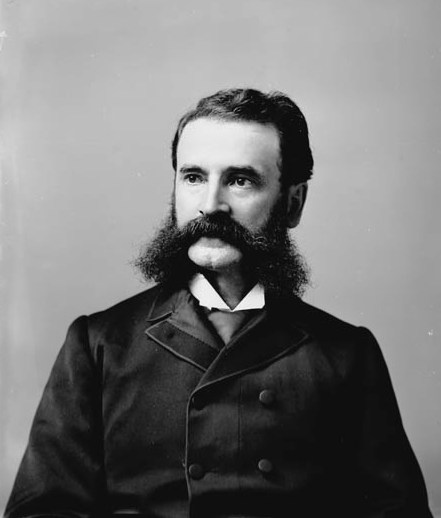
- Charles Alphonse Pantaléon Pelletier as he appeared in July, 1891

Member of the Canadian Parliament for Kamouraska
- In office February 17, 1869 – February 2, 1877
- Succeeded by: Charles-François Roy

Member of the Legislative Assembly of Quebec for Québec-Est
- In office March 4, 1873 – January 20, 1874
- Preceded by: Jacques-Philippe Rhéaume
- Succeeded by: Pierre-Vincent Valin

Senator for Grandville, Quebec
- In office February 2, 1877 – September 1904
- Nominated by: Alexander Mackenzie
- Preceded by: Luc Letellier de St-Just
- Succeeded by: Philippe-Auguste Choquette

9th Lieutenant Governor of Quebec
- In office September 15, 1908 – April 29, 1911
- Monarchs: Edward VII; George V
- Governor General: The Earl Grey
- Premier: Lomer Gouin
- Preceded by: Louis-Amable Jetté
- Succeeded by: François Langelier

Personal details
- Born: January 22, 1837 Rivière-Ouelle, Lower Canada
- Died: April 29, 1911 (aged 74) Sillery, Quebec
- Party: Liberal
- Spouse: Susanne Casgrain (m. 1860)
- Education: Université Laval
- Occupation: lawyer, militia officer, politician, publisher, judge
- Profession: politician
- Cabinet: Minister of Agriculture (1877–1878)
- Portfolio: Speaker of the Senate (1896–1901)

Sir Charles Alphonse Pantaléon Pelletier, PC KCMG KC (January 22, 1837 – April 29, 1911) was a Canadian lawyer, militia officer, politician, publisher, judge, and the ninth Lieutenant Governor of Quebec.

== Biography ==
Born in Rivière-Ouelle, Lower Canada (now Quebec), the son of Jean-Marie Pelletier and Julie Painchaud, he studied law at the Université Laval, was called to the bar in 1860 and entered practice in Quebec City. He married Suzanne, the daughter of lawyer Charles-Eusèbe Casgrain in 1861; his wife died during childbirth the following year. In 1862, he joined the Canadian Militia as an officer with the Voltigeurs de Québec. A Captain by 1863, he became a major with the 9th Battalion Volunteer Militia Rifles and saw active service with the battalion in 1866 during the Fenian Raids and retired from the militia in 1867. In 1866, he married Eugénie, the daughter of Marc-Pascal de Sales Laterrière, a doctor and seigneur. He was elected as a Liberal to the House of Commons of Canada representing the riding of Kamouraska, Quebec in a by-election held in 1869. There was no election in this riding in 1867 due to riots. He was re-elected in 1872 and 1874. He was also elected to represent Québec-Est in the Legislative Assembly of Quebec in an 1873 by-election; he resigned this seat in 1874 when the dual mandate became illegal. From 1877 to 1878, he was the Minister of Agriculture in the federal cabinet.

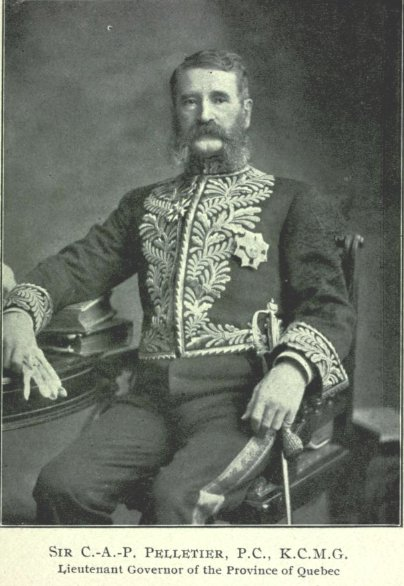
Pelletier in regal dress, as the Lieutenant governor.

He was President of the Canadian Commission for the Paris World Fair in 1878. He was made a Companion of the Order of St Michael and St George for his work on this commission. In 1898, he was promoted to Knight Commander.

In 1877, he was appointed to the Senate of Canada representing the senatorial division of Grandville, Quebec. From 1896 to 1901, he was the Speaker of the Senate of Canada. He resigned in 1904 and was appointed a puisne judge of the Quebec Superior Court.

In 1908, he was appointed Lieutenant Governor of Quebec and served until his death in 1911.
