= Mount Jetté =

Mountain in the state of Alaska

- Boundary Peak 177
- Location within Alaska Location within British Columbia

Highest point
- Elevation: 8,425 ft (2,568 m)
- Prominence: 1,693 ft (516 m)
- Coordinates: 59°59′41″N 139°03′10″W

Geography
- Location: Stikine Region, British Columbia; Glacier Bay National Park and Preserve, Alaska
- Topo map: NTS 114O14

Mount Jetté, also named Boundary Peak 177, is a mountain located near the tri-point of Alaska, British Columbia, and Yukon along the Canada–United States border, and part of the Southern Icefield Ranges of the Saint Elias Mountains. It is named in 1908 for Sir Louis-Amable Jetté, (1836-1920), a member of the 1903 Canadian Boundary Tribunal, leading to the resolution of the Alaska Boundary Dispute, and Lieutenant Governor of the Province of Quebec from 1898 to 1908. The peak of Mount Jetté is not far from the westernmost point in British Columbia.

== See also ==
- List of Boundary Peaks of the Alaska-British Columbia/Yukon border
