= Antifa (Poland) =

Term used to describe informal anti-fascist groups and networks in Poland

Antifa in Poland is a term used to describe informal anti-fascist groups and networks operating in Poland. They form part of the broader anti-fascist movement in Poland, particularly its autonomous and non-institutional wing.

Antifa is not a unified organization and has no central leadership or formal membership structure. Individual groups differ in their political views and forms of activity. People associated with these circles include anarchists, socialists and representatives of other political currents. Their common characteristic is opposition to fascism, neo-Nazism, racism and certain contemporary far-right movements.

Not all Polish anti-fascists identify themselves as members or supporters of antifa. Academic literature describes antifa as one part of the broader Polish anti-fascist milieu, alongside organizations involved in anti-racist, educational and social activities.

== History ==
=== Origins ===
The roots of the contemporary Polish anti-fascist movement date back to the second half of the 1980s, during the Polish People's Republic. Early anti-fascist groups organized security at punk and reggae concerts, which were targeted by attacks from skinheads. In the early 1990s, a network of informal anti-fascist groups emerged, including the Anti-Nazi Group (GAN), the Radical Anti-Fascist Action (RAAF) and the Anti-Nazi Front (ANF). Their activities were primarily associated with punk, anarchist and other countercultural circles.

During the 1990s, the anti-fascist movement included both groups undertaking direct action against the far right and initiatives focused on information, education and anti-racist activities. In 1993, following an attack by activists of the Polish National Community on participants in a demonstration opposing the criminalization of drug possession, RAAF was established. Its activities included providing security at demonstrations and meeting places, as well as direct confrontations with far-right groups.

In the second half of the 1990s, some anti-fascist groups ceased their activities as the skinhead movement declined. This did not, however, mean the disappearance of the anti-fascist milieu. During the 1990s, anti-fascism remained an important element of the activities of parts of the Polish radical left, particularly anarchist and countercultural circles. At the turn of the 21st century, some of these circles increasingly began using the term "antifa". Around 2003, the name began to be used by the Białystok-based group Antifa Wildeast, after which the term spread among other anti-fascist groups.

=== 21st century ===
Banner of the organization Czerwoni and group Sans Visage during the 2026 Anti-Fascist March in Warsaw, 11 November 2026

During the 21st century, antifa circles expanded the scope of their activities. In addition to directly opposing far-right groups, their activities included organizing counter-demonstrations, providing security for other demonstrations, publishing and information campaigns, and organizing anti-racist and anti-fascist events. Some groups also engaged in activities described as self-defence or attempts to block far-right demonstrations.

Polish antifa circles have used both symbols associated with the international anti-fascist movement and references to the traditions of Polish anti-fascism from the interwar period. One of the symbols used by these groups is the Three Arrows, associated with the European anti-fascist movement and the Iron Front.

Since the late 2000s, activities connected with the observance of 11 November and the annual Independence March have become an important part of anti-fascist activism in Warsaw. Between 2009 and 2011, activists organized blockades of the march. From 2012 onwards, some anti-fascist circles, including antifa groups, began organizing their own demonstrations instead of attempting to block its route directly.

In 2017, the anti-fascist coalition Zmowa Powszechna was established, bringing together organizations and collectives that declared their opposition to nationalism, racism and sexism. In subsequent years, circles associated with the movement organized, among other activities, anti-fascist demonstrations in Warsaw.

== Ideology ==
An antifa sticker referring to the Warsaw Uprising. The graphic includes the Polish Fighting Poland symbol and part of a photograph of insurgents from the Koszta Company

Antifa has no unified political doctrine or centralized ideological programme. Individual groups and people associated with the movement may represent different political currents, including anarchism, socialism and other left-wing traditions. Differences also concern social and political issues and strategies of action. At the same time, opposition to fascism, neo-Nazism, racism and certain contemporary far-right movements is a common feature of circles described as antifa.

The absence of a unified doctrine does not mean that the movement lacks ideological foundations. Academic literature on contemporary anti-fascism emphasizes its connections with the political and subcultural traditions of the radical left, as well as the importance of opposition to racism, nationalism and ideologically motivated violence. The Polish anti-fascist movement includes both radical and more moderate circles, which differ in their understanding of the threat posed by the far right and in their preferred methods of action.

Anarchist traditions constitute an important part of the ideological background of some Polish antifa circles. The history of the Polish anti-fascist movement also includes references to pre-war anti-fascist organizations and circles, as well as to the Polish resistance movement in World War II. Historical examples referred to by activists include the Red Arrow (Czerwona Strzała), Socialist Action (Akcja Socjalistyczna), the Warsaw Uprising and the Warsaw Ghetto Uprising.

Attitudes towards communism are not uniform throughout the movement. Some Polish anti-fascist circles are critical of communism and its historical legacy, partly due to the presence of anarchist and autonomist currents. Conflicts between anti-fascist groups and communist circles have also been reported.

Not all Polish anti-fascists identify themselves as members or supporters of antifa. Antifa constitutes one part of the broader anti-fascist movement, which also includes organizations and groups focused on anti-racist, educational and social activities, as well as human rights.

== Organization ==
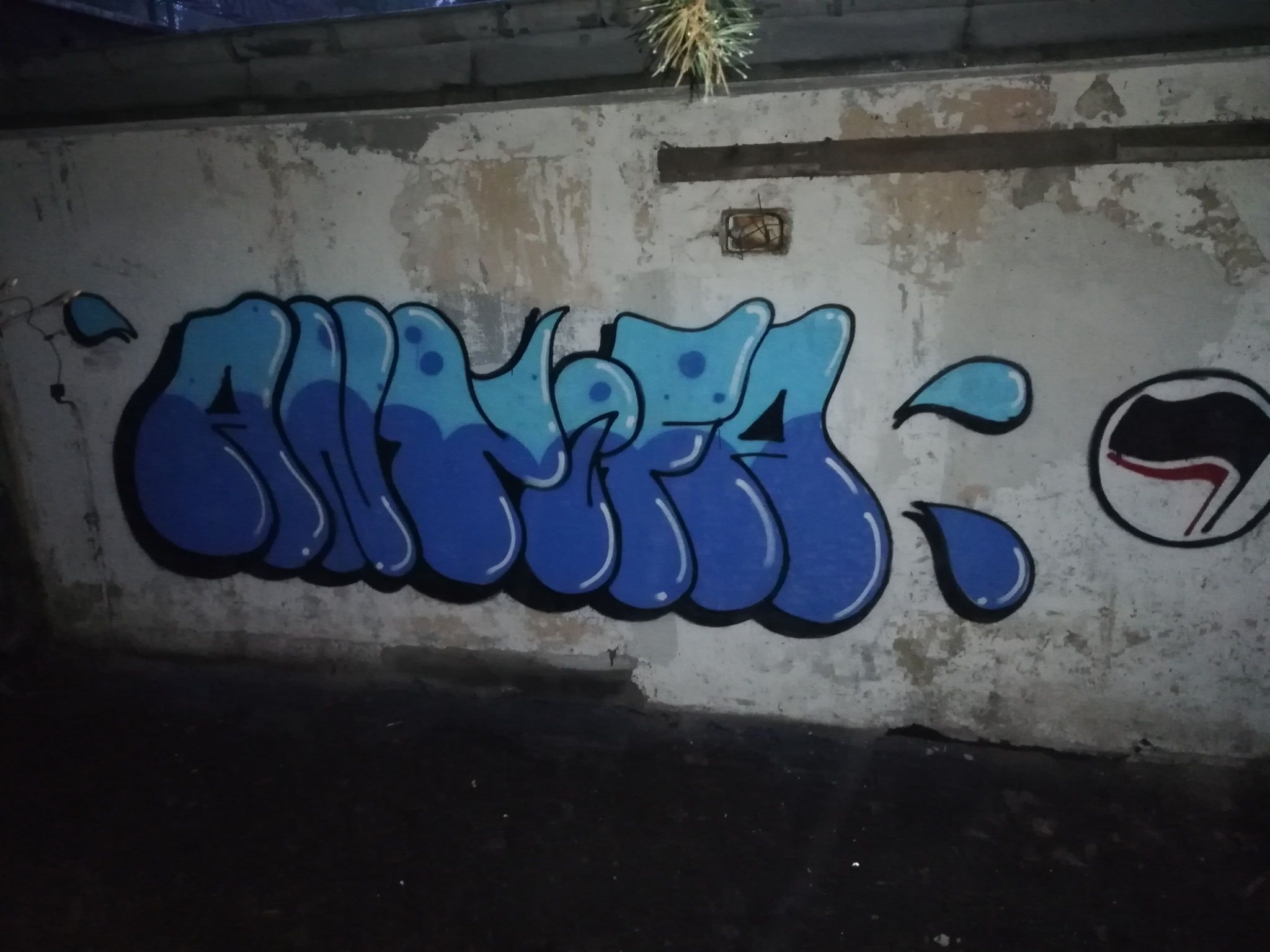
Antifa graffiti in Olsztyn (2021)

Antifa in Poland is not an organization with a unified structure. Individual groups operate independently, and their membership and names may change over time. In 2012, approximately 300 people were estimated to be associated with informal groups. They operated, among other places, in Warsaw, Łódź, Poznań, Białystok, Jaworzno and Wrocław. Their activities were primarily directed against skinheads, nationalists and local hooligans.

Initiatives associated with the Polish anti-fascist movement at various times have included RAAF, Antifa Wildeast, 161 Crew, Sans Visage, Radykalny Śląsk and Antyfaszystowski Konin. However, this does not mean that all individuals or organizations involved in anti-fascist activities are part of antifa.

== Activities ==
The activities of individual circles described as antifa vary considerably. They primarily include:

- organizing anti-fascist demonstrations and counter-demonstrations;
- blocking or attempting to block demonstrations organized by far-right groups;
- providing security for other demonstrations against attacks;
- conducting informational and publishing activities;
- organizing anti-racist and anti-fascist events;
- cooperating with similar circles in other countries.

Some radical groups have also engaged in direct physical confrontations with representatives of the far right. Activities of some circles have resulted in police interventions and criminal proceedings.
