= Rosa Antifa =

Left-wing group in Vienna, Austria

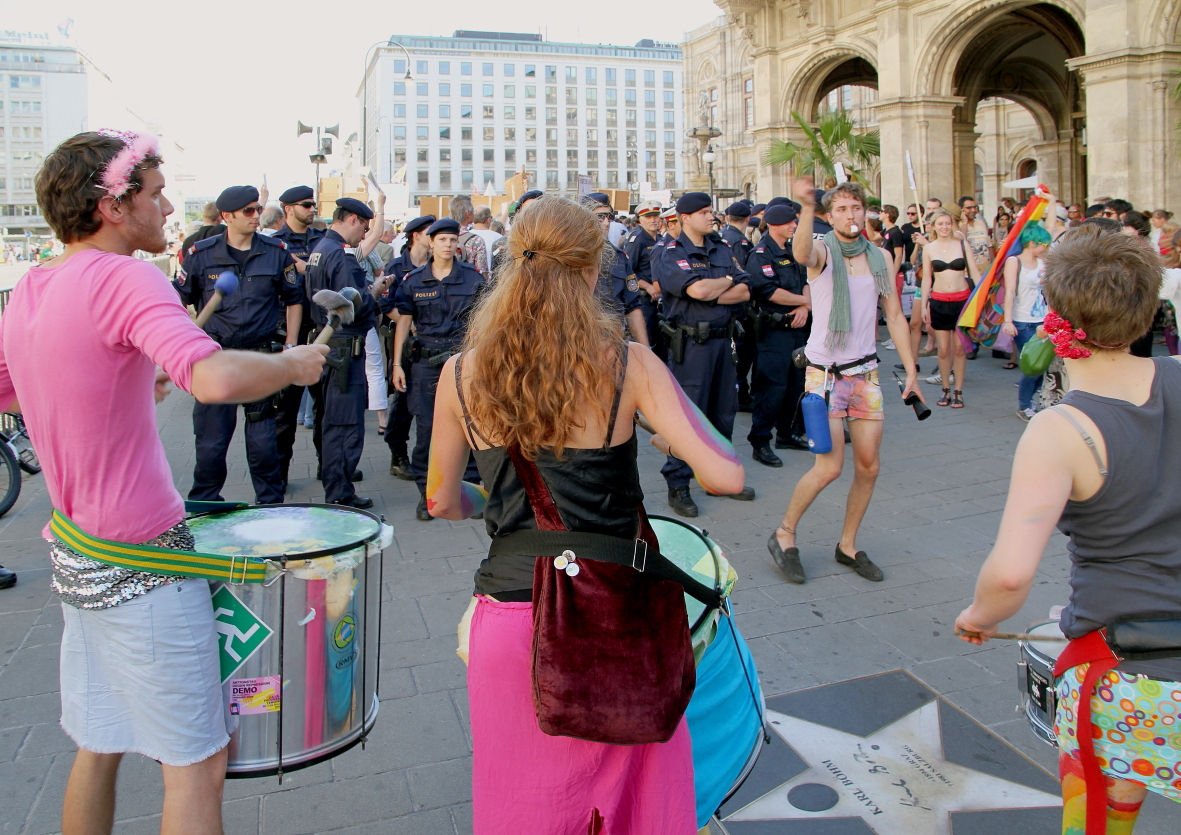
RAW tries to drown a small counter-demonstration of Christian fundamentalists (hidden by police) at the CSD parade 2012 using bowls and whistles.

Rosa Antifa Wien (RAW, Austrian German: Rosa Antifa Wien für freie Liebe und Anarchie; English: Pink Antifa Vienna for Free Love and Anarchy) is an Austrian left-wing action group in existence since 1995. Their activists regularly appear at rallies and demonstrations. Their tactics include producing and distributing pamphlets and flyers.

== Work ==
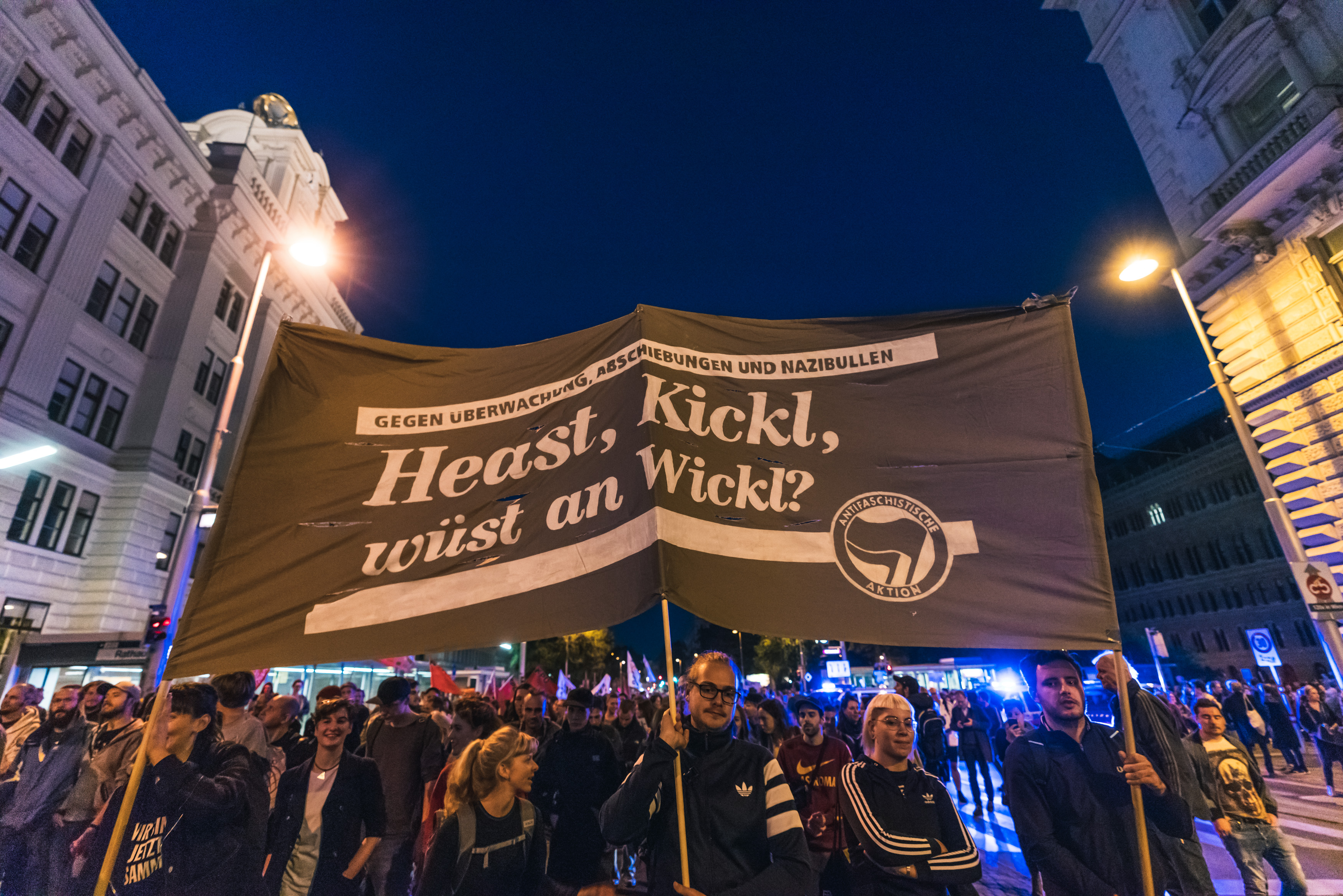
Anarchist anti-fascist action demonstration in Austria, Donnerstagsdemo on October 11, 2018

In 1995, a group of young activists founded RAW "simply because the homophobia predominant in our society – and sadly enough even amongst leftists – pisses us off." The activists are motivated by rage against the prejudice that gays and lesbians ought to be "cured“, that heterosexuality be "normal“ or "natural“. "We simply want to be able to live in relationships chosen by ourselves - without being discriminated. We want to give love to whom we want and how we like (provided our partner agrees)". This position is stated in the manifesto drawn up for the group's foundation:

"Even if we call ourselves PINK antifascists, this does not mean that only homosexuals can join us. We disapprove of any kind of verification of one's sexual orientation. We want to change the DOMINATING circumstances: We are fighting against any dividing up of human beings into homosexuals and heterosexuals, into natives and foreigners, into men and women, sick and healthy, rich and poor … and we are fighting against any resulting role appropriations and value judgements - as we are all humans, simple as that. This is damned reason enough; every individual has the right to a pleasant life in peace, according to their own individual needs. However, it is precisely this right that is denied to each and every one. In order to keep the system functioning, the division and partition of society have to be preserved and even reinforced: a division into those who kick and those who get kicked."

=== Ideology ===
RAW are present at most anti-fascist events in Austria. The activists are concerned with "racism, queer-feminism, homophobia, anti-fascism (still and forever...), also with alternative models of life and relationships, surveillance, lookism, with prohibitionism, the politics of suppression and a lot more." The Viennese activists participate in demonstrations against fascism or capitalism in Austria like the manifestation against Austria's national holiday, the walks against poverty, the demonstrations No one is illegal, the "Feminist actions against Christian fundamentalism“ in Salzburg or at the Rainbow Parade in Vienna.

Previously, RAW was located at the Ernst Kirchweger Haus in Vienna. The organization is a member of the International Antifascist Network for Research and Action.
