= Paul Bouchard =

Right wing French Canadian lawyer, politician, and journalist

Paul Bouchard (1908–1997) was a Canadian (Québécois) lawyer, right-wing politician, and journalist.

Paul's parents were Bernadette Boulet Bouchard and Alfred Bouchard. He studied at the Séminaire de Québec from 1920 to 1928. A family friend, Philippe-Auguste Choquette, secured Paul a special pass to the Library of Parliament, where he attended lectures as a young man. In 1934, he opened a law firm with Roger Vézina.

As editor of the journal La Nation (The Nation), he criticized the government of R.B. Bennett and argued that the Canadian Confederation was bankrupt. As well as a Quebec nationalist, Bouchard was also a militant corporatist tempted by antisemitism. He was inspired by Mussolini's use of the fasces and created a small militant far-right group called the Republican Fasces (or Separatist Fasces) associated with his journal La Nation. Bouchard supported a secular form of Quebec nationalism, opposed to the clerico-nationalist movement represented by Lionel Groulx.

In 1940s, Bouchard supported the government of Quebec Premier Maurice Duplessis. He was one of the main journalists and propagandists of Duplessis' Union nationale political party, and the author of many official party publications.

Starting in the 1960s, Bouchard became a professor at Laval University and held diplomatic posts for some South American dictatorships. In 1980, he became the president of the Société des écrivains Canadiens (Society of French-Canadian Authors).

Today, Bouchard is considered one of the leading thinkers of the Quebec sovereignty movement. However, he was denounced by the controversial researcher Esther Delisle for drifting into fascism. Robert Comeau, a now-retired professor of history at the Université du Québec à Montréal, dedicated a thesis to the newspaper La Nation in the 1970s.

== Bibliography ==
- Comeau, Robert. Les indépendantistes québécois, 1936-1938. Mémoire de M.A. (Histoire), université de Montréal, 1971. 2 v.
- Côté, Jean. Paul Bouchard : flamboyante figure de notre époque, 1908-1997. Outremont, Québécor, 1998. 240 p.
