= Benoît Chabot =

Canadian politician

Member of Parliament for Kamouraska
- In office June 1957 – March 1958

Personal details
- Born: 13 February 1911 Plaisance, Quebec, Canada
- Died: 20 July 2006 (aged 95) Saint-Antoine, Quebec, Canada
- Party: Independent
- Profession: newspaper dealer, sales agent

Benoît Chabot (13 February 1911 – 20 July 2006) was a Canadian newspaper dealer, sales agent and politician. Chabot served as an independent member of the House of Commons of Canada. Chabot was born in Plaisance, Quebec.

He was first elected at the Kamouraska riding in the 1957 general election. After his only federal term, the 23rd Canadian Parliament, Chabot left federal politics and did not seek re-election in 1958.
