= Joseph-Alexandre Mercier =

Canadian politician

Joseph A. Mercier

Member of Parliament for Laurier—Outremont
- In office October 1925 – July 1935

Personal details
- Born: Joseph-Alexandre Mercier; 3 December 1874 Montreal, Quebec, Canada
- Died: 16 July 1935 (aged 60)
- Party: Liberal
- Spouse(s): Lucile Piché m. 19 May 1903
- Profession: Lawyer

Joseph-Alexandre Mercier (3 December 1874 – 16 July 1935) was a Liberal party member of the House of Commons of Canada. He was born in Montreal, Quebec and became a lawyer.

Mercier attended St. Mary's College in Montreal, then earned his Bachelor of Arts degree at Université Laval at Montreal.

He was first elected to Parliament at the Laurier—Outremont riding in the 1925 general election then re-elected in 1926 and 1930.

Mercier died on 16 July 1935 before he completed his term in the 17th Canadian Parliament.
