= Nouvelle Alliance =

Quebec nationalist group

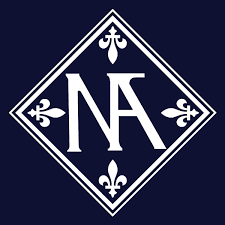
- Founding leader: François Gervais
- Leader: François Gervais
- Founded: March 2022
- Country: Canada
- Active regions: Quebec
- Ideology: Per the Nouvelle Alliance: Clerico-nationalism; Traditionalism; Quebec nationalism; Quebec sovereigntism; Regionalism; Identitarianism; Unitarianism; Anti-immigration; Per outside observers and critics: Ethnonationalism; Ultranationalism; Fascism
- Political position: Centrist (Per the Nouvelle Alliance); Far-right (Per outside observers)
- Status: Active
- Website: https://nouvellealliance.org/

The Nouvelle Alliance (English: New Alliance) is a Quebec nationalist group.

== History ==
The Nouvelle Alliance was founded in March 2022 in Montreal. François Gervais leads the group and serves as its president. The Nouvelle Alliance has been reported to have been inspired by the Alliance laurentienne.

=== Activities ===
On 20 April 2024, the Nouvelle Alliance held a conference at a bookstore in Montreal with François Gervais being in attendance.

On National Patriots' Day on 19 May 2025, the Nouvelle Alliance around the statue of Adam Dollard des Ormeaux, waving flags such as the Fleurdelisé, the Carillon Sacré-Cœur, the flag of the Parti canadien and flags of the Nouvelle Alliance. They were met with around 100 counter protesters who were participating in a "popular festival against fascism." The counter protesters brought loudspeakers and waved antifa flags, pride flags, and Palestine flags. The Service de police de la Ville de Montréal kept the two groups from fighting. Throughout the confrontation, the counter protesters chanted "Pas de facho dans nos quartiers!" (English: "No fascists in our streets!") while 50 members of the Nouvelle Alliance chanted "Le Québec aux Québécois!" (English: "Quebec for Quebecers"), "Québec libre!" (English: "Free Quebec!") and "Patrie, nation, tradition!" (English: "Fatherland, nation, tradition!")

== Ideology ==
=== As described by the Nouvelle Alliance ===
On the Nouvelle Alliance's website, it has described the organization's political ideologies as pro-independence, nationalist, identitarian and unitary. The Nouvelle Alliance has described itself as neither left nor right-wing. Nouvelle Alliance founder and president François Gervais, said about the group, "we represent the Catholic heritage of Quebec society."

During an interview, Gervais stated that Quebec needs a "fairly drastic reduction" in immigration thresholds.

In 2023, Gervais said during an interview that the reason as to why the Nouvelle Alliance wants independence is to make sure that Quebec remains majority French-Canadian.

In November 2024 Gervais said, "there is a problem with immigration: Quebec has far exceeded its thresholds for integration into society."

=== Per outside observers ===
Outside observers have described the group as a far-right, ultranationalist, traditionalist, Catholic group.

Francis Dupuis-Deri, a political science professor at the Université du Québec à Montréal described the group's actions, imagery, and logos and symbols as something that "looks a lot like fascism."

In response to outside observers, François Gervais stated that the Nouvelle Alliance is neither based on far-right ideals nor is based on fascist ideology. He also described the description by outside observers as non-logical, non-rational and "trying to stick a label on us to demonize us, to isolate us."
