= Julius Jetté =

Canadian Jesuit priest, missionary, and ethnographer

Julius (or Jules) Jetté (30 September 1864 – 4 February 1927) was a Canadian Jesuit priest, missionary, and ethnographer of the Koyukon (Ten'a) people of interior Alaska.

Born to a wealthy and prominent Montreal family (his father was Louis-Amable Jetté, the eighth Lieutenant Governor of Quebec), Jetté spurned a legal and political career by joining the Jesuit priesthood at the age of eighteen. In 1898, he arrived in Alaska, where he was to spend almost the rest of his life. As a missionary, Jetté lived and worked with the Koyukon people, especially in the village of Nulato, and produced a substantial volume of material and analysis relating to their culture. He remains one of very few non-Natives to have mastered the Koyukon language, and his linguistic and ethnographic material - especially On Ten'a Folklore - is still consulted today.

Jetté died at the Jesuit mission in Akuluraq, at the mouth of the Yukon River.
