= Lucien Tremblay =

Lucien Tremblay (March 25, 1912 – June 4, 1985) was the Chief Justice of Quebec from 1961 to 1977.

Born in Verdun, Quebec, Tremblay was educated at the Université de Montréal. He was professor of civil procedure at the Université de Montréal from 1950 to 1959. From 1961 to 1977 he was Chief Justice of Quebec. He was Chancellor of the Université de Montréal from 1967 to 1970.

He served as acting lieutenant governor of Quebec from September 30 to October 12, 1961 and from February 21 to February 22, 1966.
