= Alexis Dessaint =

Canadian politician

Alexis Dessaint (July 16, 1847 – December 18, 1890) was a lawyer and political figure in Quebec. He represented Kamouraska in the House of Commons of Canada from 1887 to 1890 as a Liberal member.

He was born in Kamouraska, Canada East, the son of Pierre Dessaint and Anastasie Martin. Dessaint was educated at Saint-Anne-de-la-Pocatière, Trois-Rivières, the Université Laval and Victoria University and was called to the Quebec bar in 1869. In 1873, he married Marie Blanche Henrietta Paradis. He was mayor of Kamouraska for several years and served as major in the local militia. He was also a commissioner in the Superior Court for Kamaraska. Dessaint died in office at the age of 43. He was one of five people killed in a train accident on the Intercolonial Railway at Lauzon, Quebec.
