= Charles-Adolphe Stein =

Canadian politician (1878–1938)

Charles-Adolphe Stein, KC (August 1, 1878 – February 27, 1938) was a Quebec politician, lawyer and judge.

He was born in Quebec City to immigration agent Léonce Stein and Alma Baillairgé. Stein studied at the Quebec Seminary and at Laval University where he studied law and received the Governor General's Academic Medal in 1902. He was admitted to the Quebec bar that same year and became King's Counsel in 1912.

Stein practice law in Rivière-du-Loup, Quebec alongside Ernest Lapointe and Léon Casgrain who would both serve as senior cabinet ministers in the federal and provincial governments respectively.

He was elected to the Legislative Assembly of Quebec as the Quebec Liberal Party MLA for Kamouraska in the 1912 provincial election and was re-elected in 1916 and 1919. He resigned his provincial seat on March 31, 1920, in order to enter federal politics when his law partner and Kamouraska MP Ernest Lapointe resigned his seat in order to run in Quebec East which had become vacant due to the death of Sir Wilfrid Laurier.

Stein was elected to the House of Commons of Canada in a 1920 by-election and was re-elected in the 1921 federal general election as the federal Liberal Party MP for the federal riding of Kamouraska. He resigned his seat in 1922 to accept an appointment to the Superior Court of Quebec.
