= Louis-Amable Jetté =

Canadian politician

The Honourable Sir Louis-Amable Jetté KCMG
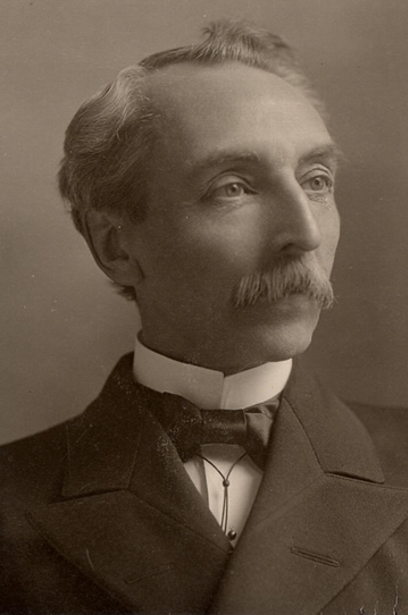

Member of the Canadian Parliament for Montreal East
- In office October 12, 1872 – September 17, 1878
- Preceded by: George-Étienne Cartier
- Succeeded by: Charles-Joseph Coursol

8th Lieutenant Governor of Quebec
- In office January 20, 1898 – September 15, 1908
- Monarchs: Victoria; Edward VII
- Governors General: The Earl of Aberdeen; The Earl of Minto; The Earl Grey
- Premier: Félix-Gabriel Marchand; Simon-Napoléon Parent; Lomer Gouin
- Preceded by: Joseph-Adolphe Chapleau
- Succeeded by: Charles Alphonse Pantaléon Pelletier

Personal details
- Born: 15 January 1836 L’Assomption, Lower Canada
- Died: 5 May 1920 (aged 84) Quebec City, Quebec
- Party: Liberal
- Spouse: Berthilde Laflamme (m. 1862)
- Children: 7
- Education: Collège de L'Assomption; Collège Sainte-Marie de Montréal
- Occupation: lawyer, editor, judge, professor
- Profession: politician

Sir Louis-Amable Jetté, KCMG (French pronunciation: [lwi amabl ʒɛte]; 15 January 1836 – 5 May 1920) was a Canadian lawyer, politician, judge, and professor who served as lieutenant governor of Quebec and chief justice of the Court of King's Bench.

== Biography ==
He was born in L'Assomption, Lower Canada (now Quebec) on January 15, 1836, son of Amable Jette and Caroline Goffreau. After receiving a classical education at the Collège de L'Assomption, he studied law at the Collège Sainte-Marie, before being called to the bar in 1857. He then practiced law in Montreal, notably participating in the Guibord case.

A Liberal, he was elected to the House of Commons of Canada representing the riding of Montreal East in 1872, defeating Sir George-Étienne Cartier. He was re-elected in 1874. In 1878, he left politics and became a judge of the Superior Court of Quebec; the same year, he joined the law faculty of the newly-established Université Laval in Montreal (later the Université de Montréal).

From 1898 to 1908 he was the lieutenant governor of Quebec. He was knighted as a Knight Commander of the Order of St Michael and St George (KCMG) during the visit to Quebec of the Duke and Duchess of Cornwall and York (later King George V and Queen Mary) in October 1901. He served as lieutenant governor until 1908, when he returned to the Superior Court bench, becoming chief justice of the Court of King's Bench in 1909. He retired from judicial service in 1911.

He was entombed at the Notre Dame des Neiges Cemetery in Montreal.

== Family ==
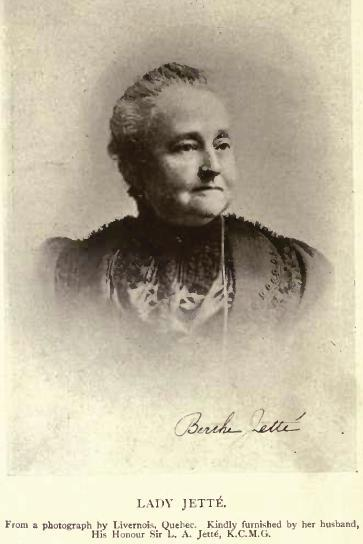
Lady Jetté by Livernois, Quebec

His wife, Lady Berthilde Jette, was the daughter of Rodolphe Laflamme and his wife. She was born in Montreal, Quebec March 27, 1841. The couple married in 1862 and lived at `Spencerwood,` Quebec.

She volunteered with various benevolent and religious institutions connected with the Roman Catholic Church in Canada. She wrote a biography of Saint Marie-Marguerite d'Youville who founded the religious order the Order of Sisters of Charity of Montreal (also known as the Grey Sisters).

His son, Julius Jetté, became a notable scholar of the Koyukon people of Alaska.

== Electoral record ==
1874 Canadian federal election: Montreal East
Party	Candidate	Votes
Liberal	Louis-Amable Jetté	acclaimed
Source: lop.parl.ca

1878 Canadian federal election: Montreal East
Party	Candidate	Votes
Conservative	Charles-Joseph Coursol	4,626
Unknown	F.X. Archambeault	3,234

== Legacy ==
Mount Jetté in British Columbia, just inside the junction of the BC, Alaska and Yukon borders at the province's extreme northwest, is named for him. Jetté was a member of the Canadian Boundary Tribunal leading to the resolution of the Alaska Boundary Dispute.
