= Sainte-Anne-de-la-Pocatière =

- Former parish municipality
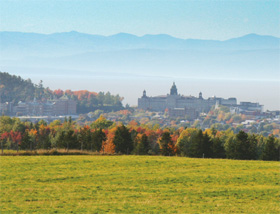

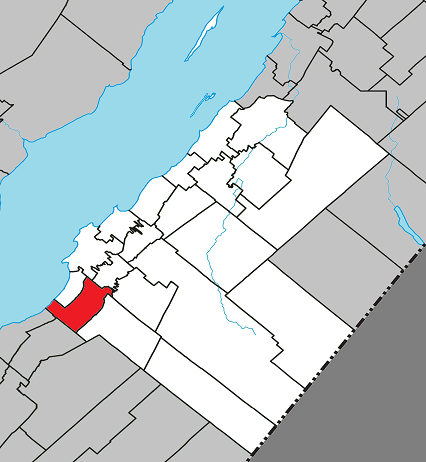
- Location within Kamouraska RCM

- Location in eastern Quebec
- Coordinates: 47°21′N 70°00′W
- Country: Canada
- Province: Quebec
- Region: Bas-Saint-Laurent
- RCM: Kamouraska
- City: La Pocatière
- Constituted: July 1, 1855
- Dissolved: September 3, 2025
- Named for: seigneury of la Pocatière

Government
  - Fed. riding: Côte-du-Sud—Rivière-du-Loup—Kataskomiq—Témiscouata
  - Prov. riding: Côte-du-Sud

Area
  - Total: 79.70 km^{2} (30.77 sq mi)
  - Land: 54.78 km^{2} (21.15 sq mi)

Population (2021)
  - Total: 1,597
  - Density: 29.2/km^{2} (76/sq mi)
  - Pop (2016-21): ▼2.4%
  - Dwellings: 717
- Time zone: UTC−5 (EST)
  - Summer (DST): UTC−4 (EDT)
- Postal code(s): G0R 2A0
- Area codes: 418, 581
- Highways A-20 (TCH): R-132; R-230
- Website: www.ste-anne-de-la-pocatiere.com

Sainte-Anne-de-la-Pocatière (French pronunciation: [sɛ̃t an də la pɔkatjɛʁ]) is a former parish municipality in the Canadian province of Quebec, located in the Kamouraska Regional County Municipality.

In 2025, it merged with La Pocatière and Saint-Onésime-d'Ixworth.

== Demographics ==
In the 2021 Census of Population conducted by Statistics Canada, Sainte-Anne-de-la-Pocatière had a population of 1,597 living in 681 of its 717 total private dwellings, a change of −2.4% from its 2016 population of 1,636. With a land area of 54.78 km^{2} (21.15 sq mi), it had a population density of 29.2/km^{2} (75.5/sq mi) in 2021.

Historical Census Data - Sainte-Anne-de-la-Pocatière, Quebec

Year	Pop.	±%
1861	3,406	—
1871	3,134	−8.0%
1881	2,878	−8.2%
1891	2,734	−5.0%
1901	2,434	−11.0%
1911	2,412	−0.9%
1921	2,885	+19.6%
1931	3,063	+6.2%

Year	Pop.	±%
1941	3,368	+10.0%
1951	3,660	+8.7%
1956	4,073	+11.3%
1961	1,173	−71.2%
1966	1,274	+8.6%
1971	1,007	−21.0%
1976	1,112	+10.4%
1981	1,566	+40.8%

Year	Pop.	±%
1986	1,758	+12.3%
1991	1,983	+12.8%
1996	1,862	−6.1%
2001	1,889	+1.5%
2006	1,843	−2.4%
2011	1,717	−6.8%
2016	1,636	−4.7%
2021	1,597	−2.4%

Source: Statistics Canada

== Government ==
- Mayor: Jean-François Pelletier
- Councillors: Sylvain Dorion, Carole Lévesque, Pascale G. Malenfant, Josée Michaud, Natasha Pelletier, Annie Sénéchal

== Notable people ==
- Marie-Claude Bourbonnais, glamour model

== See also ==
- List of former municipalities in Quebec
